= Tabletop role-playing games in Japan =

Aspect of role-playing gaming

Japanese-made tabletop role-playing games first emerged during the 1980s. Instead of "tabletop", they are referred to in Japanese as tabletalk RPGs (テーブルトークRPG, tēburutōku āru pī jī) (often shortened as TRPG), a wasei-eigo term meant to distinguish them from role-playing video games, which are popular in Japan. Today, there are hundreds of Japanese-designed tabletop role-playing games as well as games translated into Japanese.

== History ==
=== Early years ===
In the 1970s, role-playing games received little to no attention in Japan because they only had English titles. However, several gaming magazines and computer magazines started introducing role-playing games in the early 1980s.

Some of the earliest Japanese RPGs were science fiction titles, including Donkey Commando in 1982 and Enterprise: Role Play Game in Star Trek in 1983. Traveller was the first translated RPG in 1984, with Dungeons & Dragons (Mentzer basic red box edition) following in 1985. One of the earliest Japanese-designed traditional fantasy RPGs was titled Roads to Lord, published in 1984.

=== Late 1980s to early '90s: success of Group SNE ===
In the late 1980s, role-playing video games such as Dragon Quest and Final Fantasy helped popularize tabletop role-playing games in Japan.

Around the same time, the Japanese game publisher Group SNE pioneered a new book genre called replays. Replays are logs of TRPG play sessions, arranged for publication in a similar style to light novels. The first replay, Record of Lodoss War, was a replay of Dungeons & Dragons that was published in Comptiq magazine beginning in 1986. It became a popular series, which led to increased interest in the fantasy genre.

Sword World RPG was published in 1989 and became popular very quickly. The Forcelia setting includes Lodoss island from the replay Record of Lodoss War. Sword World RPG had a flexible multi-class system. It only uses 6-sided dice, since other polyhedral dice were uncommon in 1989, especially in rural Japan. The paperback (bunkobon) rulebooks were inexpensive and portable.

Notable role-playing games in the mid-late 1980s and early 1990s included:

year	Title	Author/publisher	Format	Note/description
1988	Wizardry RPG	Group SNE	Boxed set	RPG version of Wizardry fantasy CRPG
1989	Sword World RPG	Group SNE	Bunkobon paperback	Fantasy RPG, in the Forcelia setting
1989	Record of Lodoss War Companion	Group SNE	Softcover	Fantasy RPG, in the Forcelia setting
1990	Blue Forest Story	1st ed. Tsukuda Hobby(ja); 2nd ed. F.E.A.R. (1996)	Boxed set	Fantasy world similar to Southeast Asia
1991	Gear Antique	1st ed. Tsukuda Hobby; 2nd ed. F.E.A.R (1999)	Boxed set	One of the earliest Steampunk RPG
1992	Crystania Companion	Group SNE	Softcover	Fantasy RPG, in the Forcelia setting
1992	GURPS Runal	Group SNE	Bunkobon paperback	Fantasy RPG
1993	Tokyo NOVA	F.E.A.R.	Boxed set	Cyberpunk RPG
1994	GURPS Youmayakou	Group SNE	Bunkobon paperback	English title: "GURPS Damned Stalkers"
1996	Seven Fortress	F.E.A.R.	Boxed set	Fantasy RPG

=== Late 1990s and early 2000s ===
In the mid to late 1990s, trading card games (TCGs) surpassed tabletop role-playing games in popularity, and most Japanese TRPG magazines were either transformed into TCG magazines or discontinued. The first of which was a release of the Pokémon anime and trading card game in had more success than any recent TRPG in 1996.

Notable role-playing games of the early 2000s include Blade of Arcana (1999), Night Wizard! (2002) and Alshard (2002). Role&Roll magazine was established in 2003. In 2007, Night Wizard! was adapted into an anime television series. Alshard's game system was expanded into a generic role-playing game system named Standard RPG System in 2006.

=== Late 2000s and 2010s: resurgence by fan videos and web novels ===
Since the late 2000s, RPG fan replay videos have grown in popularity on Niconico, a Japanese video hosting service.

In addition, the rise of web novels has been a major influence on the Japanese fantasy and RPG scene. Log Horizon TRPG was released in 2014. "Role-playing fiction" Red Dragon was animated under the moniker Chaos Dragon in 2015. Goblin Slayer TRPG was published in 2019.

== Japanese games ==
In Japan, domestically made role-playing games are competitive in the market. Despite the market's small size, many original products are published. For example, 95 domestically-made RPG rulebooks, excluding supplements, were published from 2000 to 2007. In the same period of time, 25 translated RPG rulebooks were published.

== Translated games ==
=== From English to Japanese ===
According to the publisher's press releases in 2019, translated copies of first (2004) to fifth edition core rulebooks of Call of Cthulhu cumulatively sold 200,000 copies domestically.

=== From Japanese to other languages ===
In 2008, the Maid RPG was completely translated from Japanese into English.

In 2013, the 3rd Edition of "Double Cross" by F.E.A.R was released in English by Ver. Blue Amusement.

In 2013, Ryuutama was translated into French by editor Lapin Marteau.

In 2016, Ryuutama was printed in English by Kotodama Heavy Industries. That same year, it won a silver ENnie Award in the Best Family Game category.

== See also ==
- History of Eastern role-playing video games
- History of role-playing games
