= Group SNE =

Japanese game publisher

Group SNE Company, Ltd
- Native name: 株式会社グループエス・エヌ・イー
- Romanized name: Kabushiki gaisha Gurūpu Esu Enu Ī
- Company type: Private KK
- Founded: October 1987; 37 years ago
- Founder: Hitoshi Yasuda
- Headquarters: Kobe, Hyōgo, Japan
- Website: groupsne.co.jp

Group SNE is a Japanese company founded in 1987 by the current president Hitoshi Yasuda, which produces role-playing games, light novels, board games and card games. Ryo Mizuno was one of the founding members. Group SNE's name comes from syntax error, the programming language BASIC's term. The most famous product of Group SNE is Record of Lodoss War, which is well known for its fantasy anime adaptation. Moreover, there are several anime adaptations based upon Group SNE's products such as Legend of Crystania, Mon Colle Knights and Rune Soldier.

Group SNE's products are published by several publishers including Fujimi Shobo, Shinkigensha, JIVE, Enterbrain and Hobby Base.

== Products ==
Group SNE's products include:

- Forcelia campaign setting
  - Record of Lodoss War
  - Sword World RPG
  - Legend of Crystania
  - Rune Soldier
- Sword World 2.0
- Monster Collection
  - Rokumon Sekai RPG - RPG version of Monster Collection
  - Mon Colle Knights
- GURPS Japanese products
  - GURPS Busin kourin - martial arts
  - GURPS Cocoon - comical fantasy
  - GURPS Damned Stalker (Gurps Youma Yakou/Hyakki Yasyou)
  - GURPS Dragon Merc - crossover of multi-planes
  - GURPS Power up
  - GURPS RebornRebirth
  - GURPS Runal/Yuel
- Daikatsugeki - jidaigeki
- Dark Souls TRPG - TRPG version of From Software's Dark Souls
- Demon Parasite - superhero
- Gehenna - Arabian fantasy
- Ghosthunter RPG - horror, RPG version of Laplace no Ma
- Hyper Tunnels & Trolls - original modified edition of Tunnels & Trolls
- Laplace no Ma - computer RPG
- Ouka Housin RPG - China-like fantasy
- Shadowrun (Mega CD) - computer RPG version of Shadowrun
- Silver Rain RPG - based upon PBW RPG
- Wizardry RPG - RPG version of Wizardry
  - Shin Wizardy RPG - 2nd edition of Wizardry RPG
- Translated games
  - Advanced Fighting Fantasy
  - Dungeons & Dragons Rules Cyclopedia
  - Earthdawn 1st edition
  - GURPS 3rd and 4th edition
  - MechWarrior
  - Shadowrun 2nd edition
  - Stormbringer 2nd, Elric! and 5th edition
  - Tunnels & Trolls 5th and 7th edition
  - Warhammer Fantasy Roleplay 1st edition
