= Sword World RPG =

Tabletop role-playing game

Sword World RPG (ソード・ワールドRPG, Sōdo Wārudo Āru Pī Jī) is a Japanese tabletop role-playing game created by Group SNE. 10 million copies of the related books including rulebooks, novels and replays have been sold. The game was first published in 1989; the updated edition, known as the "Sword World 2.0", was published in 2008; the current edition "Sword World 2.5" was published in 2018.

Sword World RPG's system was given the name 2d6 System in 2003. Scrapped Princess RPG and Dragon Half RPG's system are also 2d6 System, though the games are only partially compatible.

In 2025, the United States-based publisher Mugen Gaming announced that they would be officially localizing the 2.5 edition of Sword World RPG for English speakers in the system's first-ever official international release, with a crowdfunding campaign launching on October 20th, 2026.

== Sword World RPG (original edition) ==
Sword World RPG
- Sword World RPG first edition cover. Cover art by Yoshitaka Amano.
- Designers: Ryo Mizuno, Miyuki Kiyomatsu, Group SNE
- Publishers: Fujimi Shobo
- Publication: 1989 (1st edition); 1996 (Complete edition)
- Genres: Fantasy
- Systems: 2d6 System

=== System ===
Sword World RPG's classes are called ginou (技能, technical skill,) with gi (技, technique, art, skill, vocation) and nou (能, ability, talent, skill). Each ginou is a package of skills for that class. It is considered a hybrid system between a class-based system and a skill-based system, and is often called a class-skill system.

There are eight classes (Bard, Fighter, Priest, Ranger, Sage, Shaman, Sorcerer and Thief) for player characters and two classes (Dark Priest and Dragon Priest) exclusive to non-player characters. Five major races (Human, Dwarf, Elf, Half-Elf and GrassRunner) can become PCs. GrassRunners are a diminutive race similar to a hobbit or halfling.

The game uses two 6-sided dice. Each 2d6 dice roll is translated into a more wide range of random numbers by using a rating table. The rating table is used for damage rolls, damage reduction rolls and such. An excerpt of the rating table follows.

Rating table (excerpt)
2d6 / Key number	0	5	10	15	20	50
2	failure	failure	failure	failure	failure	failure
3	0	0	1	1	1	4
4	0	1	1	2	2	6
5	0	1	2	3	3	8
6	1	2	3	4	4	10
7	2	2	3	4	5	10
8	2	3	4	5	6	12
9	3	4	5	5	7	12
10	3	5	5	6	8	13
11	4	5	6	7	9	15
12	4	5	7	8	10	15

Key number is equal to weapon/armor's requirement strength, or power of spell. Heavier weapon/armor is stronger.

=== Setting ===
Sword World's setting, Forcelia, includes Lodoss Island (of Record of Lodoss War) and the continent of Crystania (of Legend of Crystania). However, the largest continent, Alecrast (where Rune Soldier takes place) is the main setting. Forcelia is a typical fantasy world heavily influenced by games such as Dungeons & Dragons and RuneQuest. For instance, the GrassRunner race is similar to D&D's Halfling and several magic systems (spirit magic, sorcery and divine magic) are similar to RuneQuest's.

Rune Soldier is Sword World RPG's novel and anime series. Over a hundred light novels or replays (session logs) have been published.

=== Magic systems ===
All magic systems in Forcelia are called mahougo (魔法語, lit. magic language, magic tongue) based upon belief in the power of words. Each magic system has a proper language system as follow, and the language has magic power in itself.

Forcelia's magic systems
Magic system	Class (ginou)	Language name	System's name
Sorcery	Sorcerer	Kodaigo (古代語, lit. "Ancient language")	High Ancient
Spirit magic	Shaman	Seireigo (精霊語, lit. "Spirit language")	Silent Spirit
Divine magic	Priest	Shinseigo (神聖語, lit. "Holy language")	Holy Pray
Dark magic	Dark priest	Ankokugo (暗黒語, lit. "Dark language")	Demon Scream
Dragon magic	Dragon priest	Ryūgo (竜語, lit. "Dragon language")	Dragon Lore
Common magic	^{a}	kyoutsūgo (共通語, lit. "Common language")	Common magic
Bard's songs	Bard	Juka (呪歌, lit. "Magic songs")^{b}	-

^a - Every character can use common magic (weaker cantrip of High Ancient sorcery) by the use of commercial magic devices and the chant of the keyword in common language.
^b - Songs with lyrics in the ancient language of High Ancient sorcery.

== Sword World 2.0/2.5 ==
Sword World 2.0
- Sword World 2.0 cover
- Designers: Kei Kitazawa, Group SNE
- Publishers: Fujimi Shobo
- Publication: April 2008 (2.0); July 2012 (2.0 revised); July 2018 (2.5)
- Genres: Fantasy
- Systems: 2d6 System

The new edition Sword World 2.0 (SW2.0 for short) was released in April 2008 and revised in 2012. In 2018 Sword World 2.5 (SW2.5) was launched.

=== System ===
Currently (after the release of Abyss Breaker supplement), there are 23 classes:

- Warrior type: Battle Dancer, Fighter, Fencer, Grappler, Marksman
- Wizard type: Abyss Gazer, Conjurer, Demon Tamer, Druid, Fairy Tamer, Magitechnician, Priest, Sorcerer
- Other type: Alchemist, Bard, Dark Hunter, Enhancer, Geomancer, Ranger, Rider, Sage, Scout, Tactician

Sword World RPG uses only two 6-sided dice as with the previous editions.

The supplements Epic Treasury and Raxia Life have introduced so-called work skills. Adventurers can choose common jobs at a basic level in order to gain new skill checks, roleplaying opportunities and even earn some gamels between adventures.

=== Setting ===
It has a new campaign setting named Raxia. Several old and new races can be found in the rulebooks #1-3.

==== Humanoid Races ====
- Dwarf - Stout, stubborn, and hardy people shorter than the average Human, yet blessed with control over fire and often loyal to those they call friends.
- Elf - Delicate yet magically gifted humanoids who have intrinsic bonds with nature.
- Grassrunner - Childlike people who make a living wandering the lands.
- Human - The most average and most populous humanoid race on Raxia.
- Leprechaun - A seclusive race of humanoids with furry ears, specializing in magitech and items.
- Lildraken - A race of bipedal dragon-folk. Contrary to their towering, intimidating appearances, they are known to be wise and sociable, tending to work as merchants and peddlers.
- Lykant - A humanoid-looking race with tails and ears covered with fur who have the ability to transform their heads into beastly ones and gain animalistic strength.
- Meria - Human-like beings with flowers on them, being closer to plants in biology.
- Nightmare - Mutants of other races born with horns along with a gift for fighting and magic. However, because it is believed that their souls are distorted and polluted, as well as almost always killing their mothers with their horns at childbirth, Nightmares are looked at askance.
- Runefolk - An artificial humanoid race who have a desire to serve the other races by instinct.
- Tabbit - A bipedal rabbit race that often travel around the world.
- Tiens - An artificially created humanoid race with metallic-coloured hair and jewels on their bodies.

==== Rare Humanoid Races ====
- Abyssborn - Born in the Shallow Abyss, these Human mutants have dark purple skin and eyes as well as body parts resembling a Daemon's body.
- Alv - A humanoid race born with one soulscar. They are slender, have white skin and golden or red irises. They need to suck mana out of other beings once per week or they will die.
- Dark Dwarf - Pale Dwarves used to living underground and serve the Barbarous as excellent blacksmiths.
- Fluorite - Mineral-bodied beings with glowing heads and good mental capabilities as well as a good amount of MP.
- Newman - A very intelligent race with snow-white skin created by the Ancient Magic Civilization via magic.
- Shadow - A humanoid race with grey skin, three eyes and flexible limbs, making them fit for work as spies and assassins.
- Soleil - A race of big, strong, and optimistic humanoids. They can make their bodies glow and can regenerate HP by basking in the sun, though they are not particularly intelligent.
- Spriggan - Small humanoids that have the ability to transform into 2.5-metre high giants for a short amount of time.
- Weakling - Barbarous born with fewer soulscars and thus often abused in Barbarous society. While being quite sturdy, they are not the most intelligent. There are currently four types of Weaklings: Garuda, Tannoz, Basilisk and Minotaur.

==== Barbarous Races ====
2.0 supplements Barbarous Tales and Barbarous Book introduced Barbarous PCs, though compared to the Humanoid races, Barbarous are not as well-balanced and are recommended for Barbarous-only campaigns.

- Arbor - Pale, plant-like humanoids resembling Meria, possessing a talent for stealth and the power to manipulates flames.
- Baba Yaga - A race of all-female humanoids who tend to live alone, having expertise in magic. They have the ability to temporarily increase their soulscars, turning into crones in exchange for a boost in magic and use of their race's Witch's Fire spell.
- Basilisk - Human-like Barbarous who can petrify anyone they set their sights upon. They have a disposition for masterminding events from the shadows, though they should not be underestimated when they act in the open.
- Dhampir - Hybrids sired between a Humanoid mother and a Nosferatu father.

The supplement "Arcane Relics" has also added several subraces to core classes like Snow Elves, Small-Winged Lildraken, Pico Tabbits and Alisha Grassrunners. These optional subraces slightly alter class bonuses or attributes.

== Replays ==
Group SNE pioneered a new book genre called replay. Replays are RPG session logs arranged for reading, similar in style to light novels. The first replay, Record of Lodoss War, is a replay of Dungeons & Dragons. From that time, replays became popular in Japan, and not only with RPG gamers. Several characters and parties in replays are as popular as characters of anime (for example, the beautiful female elf Deedlit in Record of Lodoss War, who was played by the male science fiction novelist Hiroshi Yamamoto).

Sword World replays are popular, too: about 10 series and over 40 books of original Sword World replays were published until 2008. Since 2008, more than 30 series and over 80 books of Sword World 2.0 replays were published, as of 2016 September.

== Video games ==
There have been three role-playing video games released by T&E Soft officially based on Sword World. These were Sword World PC for the NEC PC-9801 in 1992, Sword World SFC for the Super Famicom in 1993, and Sword World SFC 2: Inishie no Kyojin Densetsu for the Super Famicom in 1994.

In 2009, Sword World 2.0 was released for the Nintendo DS handheld game console as a role-playing visual novel adventure game that attempts to simulate the full experience of playing a tabletop RPG. The game features branching plot paths and multiple endings, as well as virtual dice rolls that partially determine the events, character parameters, and enemy encounters.
