= Record of Grancrest War =

Japanese light novel series

- First light novel volume cover

グランクレスト戦記 (Gurankuresuto Senki)
- Genre: Action, fantasy
- Light novel
- Written by: Ryo Mizuno
- Illustrated by: Miyū
- Published by: Fujimi Shobo
- Imprint: Fujimi Fantasia Bunko
- Original run: August 20, 2013 – March 20, 2018
- Volumes: 10 + 1 side story
- Light novel

Grancrest Adept: Mushoku no Seijo, Soen no Kenshi
- Written by: Ryo Mizuno, Notane Kaki
- Illustrated by: Ayumu Kasuga
- Published by: Fujimi Shobo
- Imprint: Fujimi Fantasia Bunko
- Published: September 20, 2013
- Manga
- Written by: Ryo Mizuno
- Illustrated by: Makoto Yotsuba
- Published by: Hakusensha
- English publisher: NA: Viz Media
- Magazine: Young Animal
- Original run: June 10, 2016 – June 28, 2019
- Volumes: 7
- Anime television series
- Directed by: Shinichi Omata (Note: Credited under the pseudonym Mamoru Hatakeyama.)
- Produced by: Yousuke Futami; Yasuhiro Nakajima; Tomoyuki Oowada; Noriko Kosukegawa; Takashi Tanaka; Manabu Jinguuji; Hajime Ueno; Hiroaki Murakami
- Written by: Ryo Mizuno; Shunsaku Yanō
- Music by: Yugo Kanno
- Studio: A-1 Pictures
- Licensed by: AUS: Madman Entertainment; BI: MVM Films; NA: Aniplex of America; SEA: Medialink
- Original network: Tokyo MX, GYT, GTV, ABC, TVA, BS11
- Original run: January 6, 2018 – June 23, 2018
- Episodes: 24
- Video game
- Developer: Aquria
- Publisher: Bandai Namco Entertainment
- Genre: TRPG
- Platform: PlayStation 4
- Released: JP: June 14, 2018
- Video game

Record of Grancrest War: Quartet Conflict
- Developer: Bandai Namco Entertainment
- Publisher: Bandai Namco Entertainment
- Genre: ARPG (Hack and slash)
- Platform: iOS, Android
- Released: JP: June 2018; NA/EU: October 31, 2018
- icon

Record of Grancrest War (Japanese: グランクレスト戦記, Hepburn: Gurankuresuto Senki) is a Japanese light novel series and tabletop role-playing game written by Ryo Mizuno and illustrated by Miyū. Fujimi Shobo have published it in ten volumes from 2013 to 2018 under their Fujimi Fantasia Bunko imprint. A manga adaptation of the first two light novels with art by Makoto Yotsuba was serialized from June 2016 to June 2018 in Hakusensha's seinen manga magazine Young Animal. It has been collected in seven tankōbon volumes. An anime television series adaptation produced by A-1 Pictures aired from January 6 to June 23, 2018. A strategy video game for the PlayStation 4 was published on June 14, 2018.

== Plot ==
Once upon a time, the world was ruled by Chaos. Chaos is one of many features of this mysterious world. Its concentration distorts the laws of nature, which leads to the emergence of demons and natural disasters, which people call "the scourge of Chaos." Then came "a man with a holy seal" and "returned the order". He was called the Lord. He was the only one who could use the seal and therefore protected people from Chaos. As a result of his actions, the territories occupied by people expanded instantly. So the Lord must be. But, everything has its own good and bad side. When the level of Chaos has gone down, the Crests have become instruments used in power struggles. At the moment, all people are divided between the Fantasia Union and the Factory Alliance.

Over time, the two power blocs' rulers decided to arrange the wedding of their heirs to unite and complete the creation of the Great Seal - a symbol of order for the eternal peace. However, both dukes were eliminated, and wars were unleashed on their territories with new forces. At the center of this battle was a student from the Magical Academy named Siluca, on which the earl named Lord Villar laid his eyes. The purpose of Siluca was to conclude an agreement with Villar, and on the way to Altirk (where Villar ruled), she was surrounded by hostile soldiers, but Lord Theo came to her aid. And they begin their adventures.

== Characters ==
Theo Cornaro (テオ・コルネーロ, Teo Korunēro)
Voiced by: Kentarō Kumagai (Japanese); Brandon Winckler (English)
Theo possesses a crest (which signifies nobility and gives superhuman powers) he received through defeating a monster, whereas normally one has to get one through transfer from another crest-holder. He has an idea to bring peace to the land, which Siluca vows to support him in achieving. While Theo and Siluca took a trip through a forest, they took shelter from the rain, where he conveyed his feelings to her. He would later become leader of the Altirk Treaty, then ascend as Emperor when the Factory Alliance and the Fantasia Union was unified with the engagement of their leaders. In the three years following the unification, he would marry Siluca and abdicate the throne in favor of Alexis Doucet so that he and Siluca would return to his homeland.
Siluca Meletes (シルーカ・メレテス, Shirūka Meretesu)
Voiced by: Akari Kitō (Japanese); Jeannie Tirado (English)
Siluca is a 17-year-old mage that has large amounts of talent, and wishes to stop the feuding of lords. She is the first to contact Theo, and possesses a cat familiar that is the king of the cat kingdom, and can travel through shadows. On a trip through a forest Theo conveys his feelings to her, while taking shelter from the rain, and she reciprocates. With Theo's rise as emperor, she becomes the Imperial Mage Leader and marries him. After Theo abdicates the throne to Alexis, he and Siluca return to his homeland.
Irvin (アーヴィン, Āvin)
Voiced by: Yuichi Nakamura (Japanese); Alan Lee (English)
A demon seal holder, which basically is a seal that gives him extreme fighting capabilities. He is also one of the strongest ones, holding the title of Chamberlain, being one of the guards to the Archdukes (the highest level of crest-holders). His movements are usually un-seeable to the untrained eye. He becomes Siluca's guard after realizing her abilities when she was the only one who recognized danger from the Chaos that killed the two Archdukes.
Aishela (アイシェラ, Aishera)
Voiced by: Reina Ueda (Japanese); Allegra Clark (English)
A friend of Siluca's, and also a demon seal holder, as well as a top-class fighter. She exhibits perverted and mild psychopathic traits at times. She supports Siluca in her quest for peace, though, upon Pandora's orders, nearly killed her and Theo. However her Pandora's seal since then been eradicated and she fully supports Siluca and Theo.
Lassic David (ラシック・ダビッド, Rashikku Dabiddo)
Voiced by: Satoshi Hino (Japanese); Imari Williams (English)
A former crest-holder and lord of a country next to Theo's. After being defeated by him. He chooses to serve him and transfer his goal of conquering all nations to Theo, as he believes Theo has the power to do it.
Moreno Dortous (モレーノ・ドルトゥス, Morēno Dorutusu)
Voiced by: Yoshitsugu Matsuoka (Japanese); Lucien Dodge (English)
A mage in the service of Lassic and a former upperclassman to Siluca in the mage academy. He is one of the only mages to be proficient in swordsmanship as well, because he believes that mages now need to fight on the front lines too. With this, he is able to overpower Siluca.
Priscilla Farnese (プリシラファルネーゼ, Purishira Farunēze)
Voiced by: Natsumi Takamori (Japanese); Kayli Mills (English)
A priestess of the religious Order of the Crest. She has the same family name as the late pope. Priscilla expresses her hope that she can help Lord Theo with, what she sees as, his "divine battle to subdue Chaos". She has a 3-dimensional crest called The Holy Grail that she uses to heal people. When Siluca starts to voice a possible family connection, Priscilla politely silences her. She was later killed by the current Pope of the Order of the Crest who was working under the influence of Pandora.
Marrine Kreische (マリーネ・クライシェ, Marīne Kuraishe)
Voiced by: Ai Kayano (Japanese); Erika Harlacher (English)
The Margrave who became in charge of the Factory Alliance after her father, the archduke, was killed along with the archduke of the Fantasia Union on her wedding day (later known as The Great Hall Tragedy). While she is still in love with Alexis Doucet, the political tensions between the Alliance and the Union has made it impossible to talk with Alexis in a peaceful setting. In addition, her vow to honor her father's memory as leader of the Alliance has set her down the warpath out of honor; making her believe that her love for Alexis is impossible to maintain, even surrendering her virginity to Mirza Kooches in order to gain him as an ally. She would, however, later be re-engaged to Alexis anyway, with help from Theo and the Altirk Treaty, to unify the Alliance and the Union. Three years later, Theo, Siluca, Alexis, and Marrine have a double wedding, Marrine gave birth to twins and Theo abdicates the throne to Alexis so that he and Siluca may return to his hometown. With her husband's ascension as the Second Emperor of Leon, she becomes his chancellor.
Aubeste Meletes (アベストメレテス, Abesuto Meretesu)
Voiced by: Satoshi Mikami (Japanese); Ben Lepley (English)
The Mage Leader for the Factory Alliance and Siluca's adoptive father. He is the mage to Lady Marrine Kreische. Even though he loves Siluca, he always put his duty first over family.
Villar Constance (ヴィラール・コンスタンス, Virāru Konsutansu)
Voiced by: Takahiro Sakurai (Japanese); Greg Chun (English)
The Earl of Altirk and Marrine's cousin despite being from the Fantasia Union. He is known as a lewd lord for having young female mages contracted to him--in actuality a ruse to protect these mages from those who fear their powers. He later releases them from their contract upon reaching the age of 25 to allow them to get married. He was the lord that Siluca was going to meet until she met Theo. He was killed at Castle Unicorn by Marrine's reinforcements after being betrayed by Mirza.
Margaret Odius (マーガレット・オディウス, Māgaretto Odiusu)
Voiced by: Yuko Kaida (Japanese); Lauren Landa (English)
A 25 year-old lead female mage originally from Dartania that was contracted to Lord Villar Constance. She was an upperclassman to Siluca. She sacrificed her life for Villar from Marrine's army.
Mirza Kooches (ミルザー・クーチェス, Miruzā Kūchesu)
Voiced by: Wataru Hatano (Japanese); Kaiji Tang (English)
The murderous prince of Dartania, Altirk's neighboring small continent-nation across the sea. He is a friend of Lord Villar who has been traveling in secret for the last five years. He has no use of anyone that lacks ambition, especially for those that, in his eyes, gave it up, even his own soldiers. He was slain in battle by Theo.
Alexis Doucet (アレクシス・ドゥーセ, Arekushisu Dūse)
Voiced by: Yūichi Iguchi (Japanese); Aleks Le (English)
The son of the late archduke of the Fantasia Union. An idealist and romanticist, he was to marry Marrine Kreische but The Great Hall Tragedy prevented it from happening. While he is deeply in love with Marrine and wishes to marry her, the disaster at their wedding and the political bickering had made it all but impossible to reach out to her. With the Altirk Treaty's intervention, however, he would later be engaged to Marrine to finally unify the Factory Alliance and the Fantasia Union. He later becomes the Second Emperor of Leon.
Selge Constance (セルジュ・コンスタンス, Seruju Konsutansu)
Voiced by: Hiro Shimono (Japanese); Alejandro Saab (English)
The Earl of Regalia, and a brother of Lord Villar, known as "The Fleeing Earl." He had a critical role in what led to the defeat of Milza and his powerful Dartanian contingent by Theo and the Treaty forces. He relinquished the Constance name in favor of his mother's surname and had his younger brother, Viscount Igor, continue the Constance family line.

== Media ==
=== Light novels ===
The first light novel volume was published by Fujimi Shobo under their Fujimi Fantasia Bunko imprint on August 20, 2013, and the tenth and last on March 20, 2018. An additional volume dedicated to prologues and epilogues followed on September 20, 2018.

A spin-off light novel titled Grancrest Adept: Mushoku no Seijo, Soen no Kenshi (グランクレスト・アデプト 無色の聖女、蒼炎の剣士, Gurankuresuto Adepto: Mushoku no Seijo, Soen no Kenshi), written by Ryo Mizuno and Notane Kaki and illustrated by Ayumu Kasuga, was published by Fujimi Shobo on September 20, 2013.

No.	Title	Release date	ISBN
1	Niji no Majo Shirūka 虹の魔女シルーカ	August 20, 2013	978-4-04-071114-0
2	Tokoyami no Jōshū, Jinrō no Joō 常闇の城主、人狼の女王	December 20, 2013	978-4-04-712978-8
3	Hakua no Kōshi 白亜の公子	July 19, 2014	978-4-04-070199-8
4	Shikkoku no Kōjo 漆黒の公女	January 20, 2015	978-4-04-070200-1
5	Shisutina no Kaihōsha (Jō) システィナの解放者(上)	July 18, 2015	978-4-04-070650-4
6	Shisutina no Kaihōsha (Ge) システィナの解放者(下)	December 19, 2015	978-4-04-070649-8
7	Futatsu no Michi ふたつの道	May 20, 2016	978-4-04-070885-0
8	Ketsui no Senjō 決意の戦場	November 19, 2016	978-4-04-070886-7
9	Kessen no Toki 決戦の刻	October 20, 2017	978-4-04-070887-4
10	Great Emperor Theo; Shiso Koutei Theo (始祖皇帝テオ)	March 20, 2018	978-4-04-072648-9
	DO Genealogy of Heroes グランクレスト戦記DO 英雄の系譜	September 20, 2018	978-4-04-072649-6

=== Tabletop role-playing game ===
In parallel to the light novel Ryo Mizuno and Shunsaku Yanō developed a tabletop role-playing game called Grancrest RPG. Two rulebooks were published on December 20, 2013 (ISBN 978-4-04-712983-2) and January 18, 2014 (ISBN 978-4-04-070015-1) with a supplement on September 19, 2015 (ISBN 978-4-04-070714-3). Databooks with additional information and play styles followed on June 18, 2014 (ISBN 978-4-04-070121-9) and March 19, 2015 (ISBN 978-4-04-070497-5). Furthermore, more than a dozen replay books were published.

=== Anime ===
An anime adaptation of the light novel series was announced in October 2016, which was later confirmed to be a television series in May 2017. The anime series is directed by Shinichi Omata (under the pseudonym Mamoru Hatakeyama) at A-1 Pictures and written by WriteWorks, with series creator Ryō Mizuno and Shunsaku Yanō handled the series composition, Hiroshi Yakō designed the characters, Yoshikazu Iwanami handled the sound direction and Yugo Kanno composed the music. It aired from January 6, 2018, to June 23, 2018, on Tokyo MX and other networks. The series ran for 24 episodes. The first opening theme is "Starry" by Mashiro Ayano, and the ending theme is "Pledge" by Asca. The second opening theme is "Rin" (凛, Cold) by Asca, and the ending theme is "Shōdō" (衝動, Impulse) by Ayano. Aniplex of America have licensed the series. The series was simulcast on AnimeLab in Australia and New Zealand. MVM Entertainment acquired the series for release in the United Kingdom and Ireland.

No.	Title (Note: All English titles are taken from Crunchyroll.)	Original air date
1	"Contract" "Keiyaku"(契約)	January 6, 2018
During the wedding between Alexis Doucet and Marrine Kreische, mage Siluca Meletes watches a Chaos Demon appear and kill the couple's fathers, the Archdukes of Doucet and Kreische, ending any chance of peace between the Fantasy Alliance and Factory Union. Sometime later, Siluca is sent to form a contract with a lewd Alliance Lord with Irvin, a former Kreische chamberlain who seeks atonement for stopping Siluca from saving the Archdukes. The two are soon attacked by Union soldiers sent by Mesto Meadrich only to be rescued by Theo Cornaro, an independent lord, who wishes to rescue his town Sistina from its corrupt lord. Sensing an opportunity, Siluca helps Theo raise his rank to a Knight and forms a contract with him. Later, Siluca, Theo and Irvin confront Meadrich and forced him to surrender his Crest and lands with Meadrich's mage Sartorus abandoning his Lord for breaking the treaty of not attacking free-agent mages. Now with his own domain, Siluca tells Theo the next part of her plans to join the Union rather than the Alliance.
2	"Ambition" "Yashin"(野心)	January 13, 2018
Theo comes to terms with ruling his own territory, but Siluca is worried that neighboring Lords might try to conquer the region before Theo can settle in, and summons her familiar Cait Sith, Sir Balgary, to call upon an old friend. Meanwhile, Lassic David rallies his troops to attack Theo's domain. Later, Sir Balgary returns with Aishela, an eccentric Artist and Siluca's mentor, just as Lord Lassic's troops march on to Theo's castle. Theo and his allies use their superior skills and tactics to beat Lassic's larger numbers. Lassic willingly surrenders his crest and his men to Theo, thinking that he can still conquer other territories under his rule.
3	"Battle Flag" "Senki Hata"(戦旗)	January 20, 2018
Much to Siluca's annoyance, Theo allows Priscilla Farnese of the Order of the Crest to serve him. As Theo's forces begin consolidating their power, Siluca suggests that Theo should take the name of the late hero Cornaro in order to pursue his dream of liberating his homeland Sistina. Siluca then begins arranging for negotiations with neighboring Lords to join Theo peacefully, but they mostly decline, believing Theo to be a puppet of Siluca. Later, Theo and Siluca race to a mining town where a giant chaos beast has burned the surroundings. After defeating it, Theo and Siluca help the town recover. Later, the King of Savis challenges Theo to a battle who refuses to accept Theo's independence. Though the neighboring Lords let Theo pass, they keep themselves out of the fight, but the miners that Theo saved before offer to bolster his forces. Theo projects his "Battle Flag" with his crest, empowering his troops. During the battle, Theo's forces are able to fight off Savis' large forces when the Independent lords join forces with Theo upon learning the King of Savis' intention to invade their lands, routing Savis troops and making Theo's rank a Viscount. Later, Siluca meets with her adoptive father, Aubest Meletes, and offers Theo's support to the Alliance.
4	"Decision" "Ketsudan"(決断)	January 27, 2018
Despite Lady Marrine's interest of having Theo as an ally, Aubest advises against it since a Lord that constantly switches sides cannot be trusted, and which may affect her standing in the Alliance. He tells Siluca that she will instead send help to the King of Savis to regain his lands. Siluca then asks the Earl of Altirk of the Union, Villar Constance, for help but his head mage, Margret Odius, informs the Earl cannot help her at this time and criticizes Siluca for underestimating her foes. Nevertheless, Theo and his allies decide to fight the Kreische/Savis forces in a siege in hopes to force them to accept more favorable terms for them. The siege does not go well as Aishela is critically injured fighting against the elite Waldrind knights and loses one of their forts. Lassic, though, is able to kill the King of Savis in battle. Siluca offers to surrender the Savis region in exchange for amnesty for Theo and his followers which Marrine and Aubest agrees but the Waldrind knights refuse as they want Theo dead for the humiliating defeat they suffered. However, this leaves Marrine's entourage unprotected, allowing Villar and his forces to capture her and letting her go due to their being cousins. With the Savis region now under the Union, Theo gives up the crown of Savis to Lassic to serve as a knight under Villar as thanks in exchange that Siluca continues to serve him as his mage.
5	"Forest of Eternal Darkness" "Tokoyami no Mori"(常闇の森)	February 3, 2018
With Theo serving under Villar, he and Siluca are given a task: to visit the Forest of Eternal Darkness, a territory ruled by vampires. When they arrived at The Forest, a problem arises, as some werewolves have gone missing. After trying to talk to the vampires, the werewolves try to ask Theo and Siluca to leave. But the vampires escorted them to the castle, only to find the missing werewolves, injured.
6	"Marching" "Shingun"(進軍)	February 10, 2018
Margaret is about to turn 25, and Villar voids his female mages' contracts when they reach the age of 25. He throws a party for Margaret. Everyone shows their gratitude to Margaret, as well as saying their goodbyes. Villar takes her hand to have a last dance together. Siluca looks jealous about their feelings. Inspired by Lord Villar and Margaret's dance, Theo and Siluca make an attempt at dancing, much to the distress of Siluca's feet since Theo has never danced before. After the dancing, Prince Milza Kooches of Dartania has words with Theo that lead to a sparring match at the balcony. For the first few moves Theo is able to hold off Lord Milza's attacks, but he ends up sitting on the ground having to admit defeat and thanking Milza for the "lesson". Also during the party, Lord Villar slips into his private study with Margaret for a talk. Here some background information on Lord Villar and why he only keeps female mages to age 25 is revealed. Despite her desire to stay with him, Villar reminds Margaret that she also has family commitments back in her home country. As Lord Villar and his army begin their trip to the Union Lords' Assembly, Villar decides to capture a few of the Alliance countries that they will be passing through. Prince Milza volunteers to go to one of the castles and capture it by himself. He presents himself to the lord of the castle as well as the other lords present there and demands their surrender. They attack him and are all killed, which gives Milza several crests. He charges one of the servants to bear witness to these events and report it to the Alliance.
7	"The White Prince" "Hakua no Kōshi"(白亜の公子)	February 17, 2018
All of the Lords of the Fantasia Union are gathered for a conference. As the Altirk troops head to Jalucia, the conference site, Forbes and Clovis are two points of passage that they must conquer. Theo is headed to a port city, which is ruled by an independent Forbes Lord, Ladvan Torias. Theo's first mission is to capture the port city in order to seize control of Ladvan's fortress city, but Theo could not possibly sacrifice Ladvan's people, who endear and trust their sincere Lord. While Theo suggests taking the conflict outside of the city, what kind of strategy will he deploy?
8	"The Congress Dances" "Kaigi wa Odoru"(会議は踊る)	February 24, 2018
Theo and Siluca hears from Lord Villar of how Alexis Doucet and Marrine Kreische came to meet and have a romance blossom, despite their families being on opposite sides of the Factory Alliance-Fantasia Union divide. At the Congress, after Pederico Rossini was expelled from the Union, Lord Villar was endorsed to become the leader of the Union, but instead returned the endorsement to Lord Alexis. The Union reached out to the Alliance about seeking peace, but after their seizure of Sievis, Forbes and Clovis, Marrine refuses, ordering her troops to prepare to invade Starck instead.
9	"The Black Princess" "Shikkoku no Kōjo"(漆黒の公女)	March 3, 2018
As Theo embarks on a tour of his domain with Siluca, Waldrind forces are pinned by Milza's forces. Marrine decides to use dirty tactics to subdue them, fully aware of the consequences for violating the Lord's Code. It caused the downfall of Lord Pavel Murado's castle. Before the attack started, Marinne contacts Milza and agrees to sleep with him surrendering her virginity in the process, just to bring Dartania--the only way to conquer Altirk--into the Alliance's fold. He has that intention, anyway, as he now sees Lord Villar as weak.
10	"Blade of Betrayal" "Uragiri no Ha"(裏切りの刃)	March 10, 2018
Lady Marrine knows that Prince Milza has fulfilled his vow when she hears of the death of his father Sayid and his ascension to the throne of Dartania. As the Forest of Eternal Darkness prepares for the arrival of Waldrind forces, Lord Villar plans with his Lords about Waldrind's next moves. He then asks for help from his brother Lord Selge of Regalia and King Solon of Kilhis, asks Lady Eudokia of Haman for her floating fortress, and orders Lassic to invade Ozerl. He also asks for Theo to join the Bulltavan forces at The Forest. Meanwhile, Margaret arrives at Altirk telling Lord Villar of Milza's defection to the Alliance and how he ascended to the throne--by murdering his father when he resisted. That confirms his suspicions, especially when a Dartanian naval fleet arrived unannounced at Altirk. Milza may have stricken an Altirk naval fleet, but his lead fleet is annihilated with a mirror that creates death rays using a Mage's powers. He pursues the remainder of the Altirk fleet with the rest of his fleet, only to be met by Lady Eudokia's fleet and a barrage from the shore. As Milza tries to take the battle to shore, Lord Regalia escapes with his own life after his vanguard was eliminated when King Solon comes to the rescue, at the cost of his defeat at the hands of Lady Marrine's forces.
11	"The Fall of Castle Unicorn" "Ikkakujū-jō, Otsu"(一角獣城, 落つ)	March 17, 2018
Despite sustaining some casualties, Altirk is able to hold off the invading forces. The arrival of a huge fleet of naval ships that Marrine requested approached them from Nord and sealed their fate. Villar decides to fight with Margaret to repel the enemy, but falls in battle.
11.5	"Reminiscence" "Tsuisō"(追想)	March 24, 2018
This episode revisits the events from The Great Hall Tragedy to the fall of Castle Unicorn.
12	"A Treaty Formed" "Jōyaku Kessei"(条約結成)	March 31, 2018
Even after Villar is killed, the Altirk Lords refuse to acknowledge defeat. Gathering in Lassic's castle, they form the Altirk Treaty to carry out Villar's dying wish. Lassic nominates Theo as the leader, but is unable to gain support from the rest of the Lords. Meanwhile, Marrine in hopes of recovering Bulltava, tries to reach out to Theo. Assessing the current state of war, Siluca suggests a clever scheme to Theo.
13	"To The Homeland" "Furusato e"(故郷へ)	April 7, 2018
In order to distinguish himself as being fit to lead the Altirk Treaty, Theo heads to Sistina. To rescue the people there, suffering under Rossini family's oppression, Theo tries to rally for an uprising throughout the domain, but the people are afraid of the Rossinis and the repercussions of rebelling against them. With Theo's hometown, Marza, the last town left, they warmly welcome him and his party.
14	"The Liberator of Sistina" "Shisutina no Kaihō-sha"(システィナの解放者)	April 14, 2018
The rumor that Theo has killed the Rossini's third son Salvador spread through Sistina in a matter of time. A riot occurs in various places, and people come together under Theo to join the uprising. Pederico, whose son was killed, instructs his eldest son Doni to collect five thousand soldiers in order to take Theo's life. With the Doni army approaching with anger, the assassin Boltz and Black Witch Jana quietly sneak into the battlefield too.
15	"Return" "Kikan"(帰還)	April 21, 2018
Theo liberates his homeland from the oppression of the Rossinis at last. Not only does the Mage Association recognize Theo as ruler of Sistina, he also becomes ruler of Bulltava. Jana was captured and sentenced to be executed in Sistina immediately, forgoing any interrogation, but Siluca finds this questionable. Just then, Theo has to return to Altirk right away when they hear about Milza's purge of the people there. Theo vows to defeat Milza.
16	"Outpost" "Zenshō"(前哨)	April 28, 2018
Despite being met with attacks on their detached group by Werewolves, White Witches, and even the magically-manipulated undergrowth, Milza reaches the castle at The Forest of Eternal Darkness and challenged Theo, but he has already claimed victory as they are, after all, in his bastion, and that the forest's appearance will change by nightfall and kill them. Milza retreats from The Forest, but swearing that he will go after the other members of the Altirk Treaty. Siluca then notices Telius Savoie--Milza's mage who is a brilliant military strategist, on loan from Marrine. With that in mind, Theo's forces prepare for the grueling battle that is ahead. Milza later orders his troops to invade Regalia as an attempt to lure Theo out. Siluca hears of this, and suggests that Theo plays along with the situation, as this will be a golden opportunity to reclaim Castle Unicorn. Lord Selge Constance, the Earl of Regalia, abandoned his castle to buy Theo some time to gather up a huge force; and when Theo managed to do so, it shocked Milza and Telius--worse, they are already in position and established a stronghold; and later realizing the reason why Regalia was sacrificed. Milza gives the order to attack, but Tellius says, with the number of troops they have, it is suicide; and asks that Milza request for backup. However, Marrine can only spare 3,000 troops as they were preparing for Earl LeColeurs; while Ulrica, the leader of the Nordic fleet, is sent packing when Lady Eudokia of Haman stops the Nordic invasion by managing to rally her troops buck naked, and convince the slave soldiers from Starck serving the Nords to come to their side and go against the plunderer Nords. Not to mention there is really a full-blown rebellion happening among the slaves in Starck, thanks to Juriel Rossini's help. Milza, hoping for those reinforcements, is unaware of what is going on.
17	"Two Heroes" "Ryōyū"(両雄)	May 5, 2018
Despite Telius telling him it's suicide with the troops they have, Milza resists, trying not to expose Marrine to danger; and since he cannot wait any longer, and his pride is already overcoming his sense of judgment. Milza's forces storm out of Castle Unicorn, facing troops stationed at the fort guarding the castle gates, and went through the troops from Sistina and the Kilhis Army to reach Sir Lassic's troops. But Lassic, later joined by Selge's forces, sees the Dartanians swerving in direction and headed straight for Theo's forces. He then tries to go after them and stop them. Seeing what's going on, Theo tries to send back the volunteers back to the castle and prevent casualties, but with Siluca's urging, changes his mind when the volunteers show their willingness to fight. Siluca, Aishela, Irwin, and the Werewolf twins engage Milza, but it is not long until he gets to face Theo. Even with his troops no longer fighting, and despite him reaching his limit, Milza refuses to admit defeat, and is defiant even when Theo plunges his sword down his throat. Theo then regains Lord Villar's Crest. News of Milza's death reach Marrine, causing her to change course and focus on the Earl of LeCouleurs.
18	"Leader" "Meishu"(盟主)	May 12, 2018
After accepting leadership of the Altirk Treaty, Theo declares their split from the Union in order to strike a balance between them and the Alliance, though they will still cooperate with the Union. After a brief celebration, Theo asks Siluca to be his queen when he returns to his homeland during a private moment. She accepts, but asks that he keep it in secret for the time being. Meanwhile, news of Theo's assumption of the leadership of the Treaty reach Marrine. She then wastes no time in dealing with the Earl of LeCouleurs. The next day, Siluca tells Priscilla of Pope Leone's declaration of himself as the Holy Grail, when Priscilla is the Holy Grail. Siluca warns her that the Pope, having the same objectives, may be planning on taking her and Theo's Crests. Later, Irwin reports that the Earl of LeCouleurs has fallen at the hands of Waldrind's forces, part of which is due to the betrayal of mercenaries sent by Lord Dawson, who has defected to the Alliance. All they could do is adjust, starting by going to the Union territory of Jalucia to cheer up Alexis, as well as to convince him as the leader of the Union to strike a military balance between them, the Alliance, and the Treaty. Alexis is hesitant at first, but, for Marrine's sake, decides to spring up a surprise for Lord Dawson with an attack.
19	"The Awakening of a Noble" "Kimiko Kakusei"(公子覚醒)	May 19, 2018
Alexis Doucet, the Earl of Jalucia, decides to become involved in the war, and rallies all of the Union Lords, winning every battle against the Alliance they fight, starting with the treacherous Lord Dawson. Dawson tries to defect back to the Union, but is promptly denied. Enraged with "the Union moppet's" demands, Lord Dawson sends his forces towards the surrounding Union forces, only to be defeated by Alexis, forcing a surrender. News of the defeat reach Marrine, but she is especially surprised, even going into private grieving, upon hearing that it was Alexis that defeated Lord Dawson. She then asks for help from the Nords, which face Alexis' naval forces in a brutal, hard-fought sea battle that resulted in the death of Erik the Sea King and with Alexis claiming his Crest. With the Nords out of the picture, the Union, Alliance, and Treaty forces are evenly matched. The Treaty sought for peace between the Union and the Alliance, but Marrine refuses, insisting to run the Union and the Treaty to the ground. It is of everyone's disadvantage that a three-way stalemate has happened, as that, according to Siluca, would only be giving an edge to their "true enemy:" the one that caused the Great Hall Tragedy. Marrine also shrugged off the reason why Alexis decided to join the battlefield, and continues to deny her true feelings. Marrine later calls for all of the Alliance lords to plan for the upcoming battle with the Union and the Treaty.
20	"Pitched Battle of the Three Forces" "San seiryoku Kaisen"(三勢力会戦)	May 26, 2018
After a stalemate between the Union, Alliance, and Treaty forces, Theo calls for a summit. Here he hears from Marrine about the moves of the Mage Academy and what caused the Great Hall Tragedy. Marrine is stubborn at first because she does not want Alexis to go to war, and this also meaning the recreation of the Grancrest that caused the Tragedy; but when Alexis proposed to her despite her purity gone, she agrees to become his queen, therefore uniting all three forces. Theo, Marrine, Alexis, and Siluca agreed on certain terms, with Theo being the new emperor. Theo then asks Siluca to tell to the whole world what transpired during that time...but at the risk of the Mage Academy knowing it.
21	"Purge" "Shukusei"(粛清)	June 2, 2018
Siluca receives word from one of the mages in Eramu that a purge of mages thought to be loyal to the Lords by the Mage Academy is underway, and the newly formed Imperial Army--all Union, Alliance, and Treaty armies under the new Emperor Theo--plan to march to Eramu. A third of the mages are still loyal to the Academy, including Alex's contracted mage: they ask that their contracts with the lords they are serving to be voided, while the remaining mages destroy their wands in a gesture of secession from the Academy, as well as to avoid being tracked and eavesdropped upon by them. On the night before the march, right after Siluca and her father plan the organization of the army, Aishela--on orders from a secret organization within the Mage Academy called Pandora--executes her plan to kill her and Theo, but somewhat fails on purpose out of her love for her sister, and reveals Pandora's existence to Theo. Priscilla helps deactivate a magic circle planted in Aishela's chest, designed to kill her by stopping her heart, by using the Holy Grail of Farnese. It saves her life, but Aishela loses her Art in the process. Aishela later reveals the Association's involvement in the Tragedy and other details concerning Pandora. Undaunted by a riot in each of the factions' camps caused by mages and lords rampaging as if crazy, they prepare to march to Eramu the next day.
22	"The Holy Grail" "Seihai"(聖杯)	June 9, 2018
As the Order of the Crest declares war on the Imperial Army, the Imperial Army thinks of peaceful negotiations, as the Pope's forces include women, children, and the elderly. Priscilla volunteers to go talk to Leone the Pope, and tries to settle things peacefully, as it is her duty, despite Theo's hesitance, given how the Pope sees her. Siluca accompanies Priscilla to the Order's encampment, explaining that the Order and the Emperor have the same goal of gathering all Crests and putting an end to the Chaos. Seeing that the Order's faithful are convinced of their words, the two agents of Pandora near the Pope dupe him into killing Priscilla, under the pretense of proving that she is a fake Holy Maiden. Leone then praises Priscilla and attempts to hug her in reconciliation. Irwin sees that the Pope is armed with a knife and attempts to stop him, but Priscilla stops him from engaging. The Pope stabs Priscilla to death and attempts to declare her and her companions as heretics, and Aishela and Irwin have to fight back when the Papal Guards attacks them. However, Priscilla's Crest did not turn into a Chaos Core, as the Pope had hoped. Overcome with guilt because he realizes he has killed a real Holy Maiden, he did not care anymore if he disobeys Pandora's orders of getting the Holy Grail. Before the Pope gets killed by an agent of Pandora, Irwin stops him, the Pope being a "crucial suspect". As the agent was allowed to escape, Siluca asks Irwin to call for Theo to take custodianship of the Holy Grail, as well as to take Priscilla's body away.
23	"Castle Walls" "Jōheki"(城壁)	June 16, 2018
The Mage Academy attempts to stop the advance of the Imperial Army using a sealed Cyclops. However, Lassic and his companions defeat it in a coordinated attack. The siege of Eramu begins as the night falls and was accomplished in no time. As the outer walls of Eramu has been breached, the Academy now plans to kill Theo. As the Imperial Army prepares to enter the city, Vampire King Dmitri sends an "invitation".
24	"Grancrest" "Kōtei Seiin"(皇帝聖印)	June 23, 2018
Theo, Siluca, and the rest manage to defeat Dmitri when Aeon brought the Vampire King's real body and killed it; and the light from the Holy Grail stops any more of his shadows from forming. The battle cost Aeon's life when Dmitri drained his Art, but his last shadow, already powerless and his Art fading away, retreats, almost getting killed by the werewolf twins. They move on to Eramu, where they find out the connection between the Mage Association and the Great Hall Tragedy, and the reason for that event. They face Pandora, who warns them not to end the Age of Chaos, for the fear of another civilization being destroyed. Still, Theo insists, and Hubertus, the keeper of the Pandora Globe, commits suicide in abdication. Afterward, Theo ascends to the Imperial throne and unifies the Continent by establishing the new Empire of Leon, with Eramu as its capital. Three years later, Theo and Siluca are wed in a double wedding with Alexis and Marrine. Theo then creates the Grancrest and eradicates the Chaos from the land. This also means the end of the Crests and the mages' magic, as well as Sir Balgary fading away. Theo later abdicates the crown to Alexis, with Marrine as his chancellor, and he and Siluca return to rule over Sistina.
