= Monster Collection =

Collectible card game

- Designers: Group SNE
- Publishers: Fujimi Shobo (1997-2011); Bushiroad (2011-present)
- Players: 2
- Setup time: ~30 minutes
- Chance: some

Monster Collection (モンスター・コレクション. otherwise known as Mon-Colle (モンコレ)) is an out-of-print trading card game developed by Group SNE. Monster Collection was first published in 1997 by Fujimi Shobo. In 2000, Monster Collection 2 was released. It was acquired by Bushiroad in August 2011.

Monster Collection was later expanded to a roleplaying game and was the basis for the anime series Mon Colle Knights.

The Monster Collection game universe is a world connected to six gates of fire, water, earth, wind, good, and evil, representing East, South, West, North, Heaven and Earth. Player acts as a summoner, which engages in combat using summoned monsters.

== Rules ==
The game is a one-on-one card game, set in a 3×4 grid. One side declared as winner by capturing opponent's headquarter.

Each monster has fire, water, earth, wind, good, or evil element. A monster's ability is decided by battle spell, unit's equipment, combat items, and terrain.

== Adaptations ==
=== Comic ===
- Monster Collection (by Sei Itoh)
- Monster Collection Demon heart
- Mon-Colle Monster

=== Video game ===
- Monster Collection: Sorcerer's Mask (PlayStation)
- Monster Collection Board Game (PC)
- Monster Collection Trading card game The Millennium (PC)

=== TV series ===
- Mon Colle Knights

== Trivia ==
- Ryūsuke Mita, the creator of Dragon Half, worked as the designer for the Monster collection card game
