= Starship Operators =

Television anime

- Cover of 1st volume Region 1 DVD of Starship Operators.

スターシップ・オペレーターズ (Sutāshippu Operētāzu)
- Genre: Drama, Military science fiction, Space opera
- Light novel
- Written by: Ryo Mizuno
- Illustrated by: Ryu Naito; Kimitoshi Yamane
- Published by: MediaWorks (2001–2005); ASCII Media Works (current)
- Imprint: Dengeki Bunko
- Original run: March 10, 2001 – May 10, 2005
- Volumes: 6
- Anime television series
- Directed by: Takashi Watanabe
- Written by: Yoshihiko Tomizawa
- Music by: Kenji Kawai
- Studio: J.C.Staff
- Licensed by: AUS: Tokyo Night Train, then Madman Entertainment; NA: Geneon; UK: MVM Films
- Original network: TXN (TV Tokyo)
- Original run: January 5, 2005 – March 30, 2005
- Episodes: 13

Starship Operators (スターシップ・オペレーターズ, Sutāshippu Operētāzu) is a Japanese light novel series written by Ryo Mizuno. Six volumes were published by MediaWorks (now ASCII Media Works) between 2001 and 2005. An anime television series adaptation animated by J.C.Staff aired on TV Tokyo from January to March 2005. Starship Operators is licensed in North America by Geneon.

== Plot ==
Starship Operators is about the 73rd class of the Defense University of the Planet Kibi. As they are returning home after the maiden voyage of the Amaterasu (アマテラス), they find that their home planet, Kibi, has been taken over by one of the Henrietta region's superpowers, the Henrietta Alliance of Planetary Nations.

The original command crew all abandon ship, as per the conquerors' demands. Left alone on the ship, the cadets decide to keep their command and fight on. To this end, they have decided to ask Galaxy Network to fund the operation of Amaterasu as a fleeing self-governed nation in exchange for letting them broadcast the ship's adventures live - as a reality TV program.

The people of Earth felt detached from the war unfolding in the remote Henrietta star system, which was one reason the Kingdom was able to expand its power without interference. However, when the Galactic Network began broadcasting the Battle of Amaterasu (with some embellishment), the general public, who had previously been indifferent to the war, became fans of Amaterasu and began criticizing the Kingdom.

== Characters ==
The Amaterasu command structure is divided into three bridges. If the first bridge is inoperable or unavailable, any of the other two may assume command. The Operators' uniform color signifies their station.

=== Primary (Command) Bridge ===
Operator uniform color: blue

Sinon Kouzuki (香月シノン, Kōzuki Shinon)

Voiced by: Shizuka Itō (Japanese); Kelly Sheridan (English)
Sinon is the main protagonist and executive officer of the Amaterasu. She is a brilliant strategist in combat, often providing CO Kanzaki with a voice of reason. She is also one of the most resistant in fighting with the Amaterasu against the kingdom. Sinon has some problems when it comes to understanding feelings and thus may appear cold.

Alley Hisaka (氷坂アレイ, Hisaka Arei)

Voiced by: Akeno Watanabe (Japanese); Paula Lindberg (English)
Alley is quiet and reserved, and often handles the ship-to-ship communications. She is fighting to avenge the destruction of the Maizuru that her father commanded. This hatred results in her being one of the most driven members of the crew to the point of near recklessness at times.

Miyuri Akisato (秋里ミユリ, Akisato Miyuri)

Voiced by: Masumi Asano (Japanese); Nicole Bouma (English)
Miyuri is one of Sinon's close friends, and the chief astronomer. She joined the Defense Forces because the starships, in particular the Amaterasu, carry the best observatories in the galaxy. Miyuri has some of the best eyes on the ship and spends most of her free time observing the stars.

Cisca Kanzaki (神崎キスカ, Kanzaki Kisuka)

Voiced by: Yukimasa Obi (Japanese); Andy Toth (English)
The commanding officer of the Amaterasu. He is an excellent administrator but easily cracks under the pressures of battle. The only thing that prevents him from totally folding under the pressure at times is his pride as a man and officer. Captain Kanzaki is slightly pessimistic but he and the others use that nature to find flaws in combat plans and ways of improving the plans for maximum efficiency. Cisca is considered to be one of the leaders by the Kingdom. He was one of the two people on the ship who are aware that someone else is pulling the strings behind the scenes.

=== Secondary (Fire Control) Bridge ===
Operator uniform color: orange

Sanri Wakana (若菜サンリ, Wakana Sanri)

Voiced by: Mamiko Noto (Japanese); Ashleigh Ball (English)
The shy and relaxed teenage daughter of the president of a Kibi corporation called "Wakana Rare Metals". She has a two year crush on Takai Kiryu but has not acted on it all.

Takai Kiryu (桐生タカイ, Kiryū Takai)

Voiced by: Masayuki Katō (Japanese); Kirby Morrow (English)
The fire control chief, and commander of the second bridge. Nicknamed the "King of Fighters" among the cadets, he is also an accomplished marksman. A very laid back young man with a strong will that doesn't give into peer pressure and doesn't believe that others should either, thus he gets frustrated with the other crew members who feel forced into staying on the ship. Takai also lost a father on the Guard Ship Maizuru but rather than fighting for vengeance like Alley Hisaka, he is more concerned about the justice of the Kingdom's actions and uses the battles as a form of protest. Takai is considered third in command of the ship even though he directly states that he is unsuited for full leadership.

=== Tertiary (Navigation) Bridge ===
Operator uniform color: red

Renna Satomi (里見レンナ, Satomi Renna)

Voiced by: Yū Asakawa (Japanese); Holly Eccleston (English)
Text-message pals with Sinon, but an otherwise quiet young woman. Renna is an agent of Kibi Intelligence that was to keep and eye on the ship. She dies from gunshots from soldiers while on the planet of Shu. Renna desperately wanted to be a full member of the crew but was unable due to her job as spy.

Rio Mamiya (間宮リオ, Mamiya Rio)

Voiced by: Ayako Kawasumi (Japanese); Anna Cummer (English)
She is from a family of diplomats and politicians, and brought her uncle, former Kibi Prime Minister Tatsuma Mamiya, on board as head of the government-in-exile. She is a very politically intelligent woman who at times acts as the public face of the crew. Rio is one of the two people who knows that someone else is pulling the strings behind the scenes. While she puts on a strong face, Rio is afraid of dying in the fighting. She only ever allows this vulnerability to be shown around Cisca Kanzaki. She was head of the debate team while in the academy.

Shinto Mikami (三上シント, Mikami Shinto)

Voiced by: Tomohiro Tsuboi (Japanese); Michael Coleman (English)
The navigation control chief, and commander of the third bridge. In addition to being the helmsman of the Amaterasu, Shinto also pilots the Amaterasu's small shuttle, and is among the best flight controllers in the Defense Forces. He was given officer status due to his high grades and the fact he is one of the few males on the ship. That was done for the Network. Shinto's piloting skills have allowed him to save a number of his fellow crew's lives.

=== Other Amaterasu Crew Members ===
Operator uniform color: purple

Shimei Yuuki

Voiced by: Miyu Irino (Japanese); Samuel Vincent (English)
A child prodigy, he holds mathematics and theoretical physics degrees at the age of 15. He is also the systems administrator of the AESOP computer, and is the only commissioned officer who remained on board the Amaterasu. Shimei spends most of his time away from the rest of the crew because of the need to work in a sealed room with AESOP. He always seems to smile even when in the face of imminent doom. Shimei dies in the final episode piloting the Amaterasu as a fireship, asserting his official rank as superior to the cadets'.

Minase Shinohara

Voiced by: Yū Kobayashi (Japanese); Rebecca Shoichet (English)
The ship's only medical staff, who was a trainee during the shakedown cruise. She is highly pressed for her medical skills.

Kouki Sakakibara

Voiced by: Shinji Kawada (Japanese); Brian Drummond (English)
The chief engineer of the Amaterasu. He is nicknamed Oyassan (Old Man) by fellow crew mates, to his annoyance. Kouki does his best to keep the engineering crew from panicking but due to the high demand for his level of skill, the chief engineer can not always break up every dispute. Kouki tries to act like a father to the young crew, especially Sinon.

=== Henrietta Planetary Alliance ===
Admiral Dul Elroy

Voiced by: Dai Matsumoto (Japanese); Michael Dobson (English)
The commanding officer of the Alliance heavy cruiser Conquistador. He is the first to start treating the Amaterasu as a real threat while his constitutions cannot see beyond the fact that the Amaterasu's is made up of mostly children. The Admiral believes that only a three to one advantage over the Amaterasu will have a chance of beating the warship and its cunning crew. Elroy was responsible for sinking the Shenlong. While he is an officer of the Alliance, this man is willing to directly challenge orders if they go in the face of destroying the Amaterasu

=== Civilians ===
Dita Mirkov

Voiced by: Hitomi Nabatame (Japanese); Rebecca Shoichet (English)
The enthusiastic reporter for the Galaxy Network reality show Starship Channel. She starts to sympathize with the crew and at times forgets that she isn't officially part of the crew itself.

Peter Spikes

Voiced by: Tomoyuki Shimura (Japanese); Paul Dobson (English)
The cynical, sarcastic producer for Starship Channel that heads the show and provided funds for the ship. He cares more about the ratings than the lives of the crew and only cares about the show.

President Rau

Voiced by: Hiroshi Ito (Japanese); Fred Henderson (English)

== Theme songs ==
Opening theme

- Radiance

by Mami Kawada
arranged by Tomoyuki Nakazawa

Ending theme

- Chi ni Kaeru ~on the Earth~

by Kotoko
arranged by Yoichi Shimada

== Staff ==
- Director - Takashi Watanabe
- Screenplay - Yoshiko Tomizawa
- Music - Kenji Kawai
- Original Work - Ryo Mizuno
- Character Design - Fumio Matsumoto
- Mech Design - Kimitoshi Matsumoto
- Sound Director - Toru Nakano

== Japanese Companies ==
- Geneon Entertainment, Inc.: - Production
- J.C.Staff - Animation Production
- MediaWorks - Production
- TV Tokyo - Broadcaster/Production

== Reception ==
Luke Carroll who reviewed the series for the Anime News Network, felt that while the premise was promising and the battles were well thought out, making it "very much a thinking fan's anime", Starship Operators suffered from stiff dialogue, thin characterization, and sluggish pacing, which often left the audience disengaged. He noted that the series improved in later episodes with stronger dramatic weight and an effective conclusion, but overall fell short of its potential. Carroll praised the visual design, particularly the computer-generated spacecraft and tactical detail, though he criticized Kenji Kawai's subdued score and considered the English dub average at best. Ultimately, he judged the anime "a show with a great concept that never quite pulls itself together".

The Encyclopedia of Science Fiction notes that "Reception was mixed. Admirers praised the satirical conceit of war as entertainment, the well executed CGI, the inventive design of the spacecraft, and the emphasis on tactics over heroics, which yielded memorable duels [...]. Critics, however, faulted the compressed half-season structure, stiff dialogue, sluggish pacing, and the ineffectiveness of Kenji Kawai's muted score." It further notes that " The muted reception probably reflected the limited market in Japan for serious Hard SF, Military SF and Space Opera without Mecha or intense character melodrama, genres that have been steadily eclipsed in that country by the proliferation of fantasy and isekai sagas. Starship Operators remains a minor but intriguing experiment in Japanese sf, as well as Military SF [...] demonstrating how far a serious take on one-ship military-themed narrative could go in combining sober tactical detail with Postmodernist reflections on the spectacle of war."
