= RUNAL =

Role-playing game supplement

GURPS Runal
- GURPS Runal cover
- Designers: Shou Tomono, Group SNE
- Publishers: Fujimi Shobo
- Publication: 1992 (1st Edition) 1999 (Perfect Edition) 2005 (Yuel sequel)
- Genres: Fantasy
- Systems: GURPS 3rd Edition

RUNAL aka GURPS Runal (ガープス・ルナル) is a role-playing game supplement that was written in Japanese language for the GURPS game rules. It was written by Shou Tomono and Group SNE, then first published in 1992. It was followed in 1994 by GURPS Youmayakou.

Over twenty novels of a series named Runal Saga (ルナル・サーガ) have been published based upon GURPS Runal.

The setting is a fantasy world named Runal that was strongly influenced by RuneQuest. There are seven mysterious Moons which grant magic power to worshipers.

The Moons of seven colors are worshiped by various people as follows:

- Blue Moon - The moon of lawful deities and one of the twin moons, worshiped by dwarves and humans who prefer order and law.
- Red Moon - The moon of chaotic deities and one of the twin moons, worshiped by humans who prefer liberty and disorder.
- White Ring Moon - The moon of magic, worshiped by wizards and called Ring Moon because it split in two forming a ring when its gods left for a higher plane of existence.
- Green Moon - The moon of plants and forests, worshiped by elves and called Elfa. Elfa culture is similar to the Native Americans.
- Wandering Moon - A capricious moon whose orbit is random, also called the Moon of all colors and worshiped by various non-human races.
- Silver Moon - The moon of strangeness and madness, worshiped by residents of elemental planes and fearful monsters resembling creatures of the Cthulhu Mythos.
- Black Moon - The moon of evil, worshiped by demons.

The Rhiado continent is the main land and focus of the game. The strongest nation is the Tor-Addness Empire which is modeled after the Tang dynasty of China. Its state religion is the worship of the Blue Moon. The Toru-Addness Empire are disputing with neighboring countries which worship the Red Moon.

YUELL, the sequel of GURPS Runal, was released in 2005 as a supplement to the 4th edition of GURPS.
