= Legend of Crystania =

Fantasy novel series by Ryo Mizuno

- Cover of the first volume of Crystania: Legend of the Drifters novels

レジェンド・オブ・クリスタニア (Rejendo obu Kurisutania)
- Novel series

Legend of Crystania RPG Replay
- Written by: Ryo Mizuno, Group SNE
- Illustrated by: Satoshi Urushihara, Yukitoshi Takaratani, Jun Suemi
- Published by: MediaWorks
- Magazine: Comptiq (1989–1995); Dengeki-Oh (1995–1998)
- Original run: November 1989 – January 1998
- Volumes: 8
- Novel series
- Written by: Ryo Mizuno, Kawazoe Shōgo, Kotani Takatani, Hideo Shirai, Kurihara Satoshi, Nanami Sato
- Illustrated by: Satoshi Urushihara, Maki Makino, Jun Suemi, Naoyuki Onda, Toshihiro Kawamoto
- Published by: MediaWorks
- Imprint: Dengeki Bunko
- Original run: June 1993 – March 2002
- Volumes: 17
- Manga

Legend of Crystania: The First Adventurers
- Written by: Akira Himekawa
- Published by: Kadokawa Shoten
- Imprint: Dengeki Comics EX
- Published: 1995
- Volumes: 3
- Video game

Crystania: Legend of the Gods’ King
- Developer: SystemSoft
- Publisher: SystemSoft
- Genre: Role-playing
- Platform: PC 98
- Released: July 7, 1995
- Anime film

Legend of Crystania: The Motion Picture
- Directed by: Ryūtarō Nakamura
- Produced by: Kazuo Yokoyama
- Written by: Ryo Mizuno
- Music by: Michiru Oshima; Toshihiko Sahashi; Tomoo Misato
- Studio: Triangle Staff
- Licensed by: NA: ADV Films
- Released: July 29, 1995
- Runtime: 80 minutes
- Original video animation

Legend of Crystania: The Chaos Ring
- Directed by: Ryutaro Nakamura
- Produced by: Kazuo Yokoyama
- Written by: Akinori Endo
- Music by: Michiru Oshima; Toshihiko Sahashi
- Studio: Triangle Staff
- Licensed by: NA: ADV Films
- Released: November 21, 1996 – April 3, 1997
- Runtime: 45 minutes per episode
- Episodes: 3

Legend of Crystania (レジェンド・オブ・クリスタニア, Rejendo obu Kurisutania) is a Japanese media franchise of RPGs, novels, anime and manga by Ryo Mizuno and Group SNE. The novels by Mizuno and others were published from 1993 to 2002, based on Mizuno's RPG "replays" serialized in the Japanese magazines Comptiq and later in Dengeki-Oh from November 1989 to January 1998 issues.

A full-length Japanese animated motion picture Legend of Crystania: The Motion Picture (はじまりの冒険者たち レジェンド・オブ・クリスタニア, Hajimari no Bōkenshatachi: Rejendo obu Kurisutania; The First Adventurers: Legend of Crystania) (screened as a double feature together with Slayers The Motion Picture), a three-volume manga illustrated by Akira Himekawa, and a video game for PC 98, Crystania: Legend of the Gods’ King (神王伝説クリスタニア, Shin'ō Densetsu Crystania), were released in 1995. Radio drama (later re-released as Drama CD) adapting the same story was released earlier in 1993. Tabletop RPG materials were also released. The film was released on VHS on September 22, 1998, and on DVD on February 8, 2000, in North America by ADV Films.

The film's sequel, the three-part original video animation (OVA) series Legend of Crystania: The Chaos Ring, was released in 1996. These episodes were released on VHS on November 11, 1998, and on DVD on March 19, 2002, in North America by ADV Films.

== Overview ==
The series takes place in the same fantasy world as Ryo Mizuno other series Record of Lodoss War and Rune Soldier, albeit on a different continent. It focuses on the land which Ashram sailed to after the Lodoss series, a continent called Crystania which is under the rule of the animal gods. Ashram is the king of the people of Marmo, the cursed island in Record of Lodoss War. The plot of Crystania centers on Pirotess's (now called Sheru) quest to free Ashram from Barbas, although many new characters are introduced in the course of the story and the main character of the first series is Redon, a prince of the kingdom of Da'nan, a peninsula to the north of Crystania. Other main characters are Rails, Boakes and Rius.

=== Replays ===
Written by Ryo Mizuno and Group SNE. Initially serialized in Kadokawa Shoten's Comptiq and later Dengeki-Oh from November 1989 to January 1998 issues and published by Media Works, a former division of Kadokawa Shoten.

- Crystania RPG Replay: Legend of the Drifters (RPGリプレイ漂流伝説クリスタニア, RPG Ripurei Hyōryū Densetsu Kurisutania) (June 1995) — illustrated by Yukitoshi Takaratani. Originally serialized from November 1989 to November 1990 issues of Comptiq with illustrations by Satoshi Urushihara
- Crystania RPG Replay: Legend of the Ant Emperor (RPGリプレイ蟻帝伝説クリスタニア, RPG Ripurei Ari-tei Densetsu Kurisutania) (March 1997) — illustrated by Satoshi Urushihara. Originally serialized from January 1991 to February 1992 issues of Comptiq
- Crystania RPG Replay: Legend of the Gilded (RPGリプレイ黄金伝説クリスタニア, RPG Ripurei Kogane Densetsu Kurisutania) (March 1998) — illustrated by Satoshi Urushihara. Originally serialized from April 1992 to April 1993 issues of Comptiq
- Crystania RPG Replay: Legend of the Sealed (RPGリプレイ封印伝説クリスタニア, RPG Ripurei Fūin Densetsu Kurisutania) (July 1994) — illustrated by Yukitoshi Takaratani. Originally serialized from April 1993 to March 1994 issues of Comptiq
- Crystania RPG Replay: Legend of the Dark (RPGリプレイ暗黒伝説クリスタニア, RPG Ripurei Ankoku Densetsu Kurisutania) (November 1996) — illustrated by Yukitoshi Takaratani. Originally serialized from May 1994 to April 1995 issues of Comptiq
- Crystania RPG Replay: Legend of the Mercenaries I (RPGリプレイ傭兵伝説クリスタニア 上, RPG Ripurei Yōhei Densetsu Kurisutania Ue) (May 1998)
- Crystania RPG Replay: Legend of the Mercenaries II (RPGリプレイ傭兵伝説クリスタニア 下, RPG Ripurei Yōhei Densetsu Kurisutania Shita) (June 1998) — both illustrated by Jun Suemi and originally serialized from June 1995 to November 1996 issues of Dengeki-Oh
- Crystania RPG Replay: Legend of the Uncharted (RPGリプレイ秘境伝説クリスタニア, RPG Ripurei Hyōryū Densetsu Kurisutania) (October 1998) — illustrated by Jun Suemi. Originally serialized from February 1997 to January 1998 issues of Dengeki-Oh

=== Novels ===
The series ran from 1993 to 2002. The first several novels were published by Kadokawa Shoten. Later releases were published by MediaWorks. The first four novels were written by Mizuno and illustrated by Urushihara. Later novels were written mostly by other authors and illustrated by various artists.

- Crystania: Legend of the Drifters 1 (漂流伝説クリスタニア1, Hyōryū Densetsu Kurisutania 1) (June 1993)
- Crystania: Legend of the Drifters 2 (漂流伝説クリスタニア2, Hyōryū Densetsu Kurisutania 2) (December 1993)
- Crystania: Legend of the Drifters 3 (漂流伝説クリスタニア3, Hyōryū Densetsu Kurisutania 3) (December 1994)
- Crystania: Legend of the Drifters 4 (漂流伝説クリスタニア4, Hyōryū Densetsu Kurisutania 4) (February 1996)
- The First Adventurers: Legend of Crystania (はじまりの冒険者たちレジェンド・オブ・クリスタニア, Hajimari no Bōkenshatachi Rejendo Obu Kurisutania) (July 1995)
- Crystania: Legend of the Gods’ King I (神王伝説クリスタニア 上, Shin'ō Densetsu Kurisutania Ue) (January 1996)
- Crystania: Legend of the Gods’ King II (神王伝説クリスタニア 下, Shin'ō densetsu kurisutania Shita) (June 1996)
- Crystania: Legend of Heroes (英雄伝説クリスタニア, Eiyū Densetsu Kurisutania) (November 1997)
- Crystania: Legend of the Ant Emperor (蟻帝伝説クリスタニア, Ari-tei Densetsu Kurisutania) (August 1998)
- Crystania: Legend of the Gilded (黄金伝説クリスタニア, Kogane Densetsu Kurisutania) (April 1999)
- Crystania: Legend of the Sealed (封印伝説クリスタニア, Fūin Densetsu Kurisutania) (August 2000)
- Crystania: Legend of the Dark (暗黒伝説クリスタニア, Ankoku Densetsu Kurisutania) (December 2000)
- Crystania: Legend of the Mercenaries: Battle in Another World (傭兵伝説クリスタニア 異界の決戦, Yōhei Densetsu Kurisutania Ikai no Kessen) (March 2002)

=== Short story collections ===
- Crystania: Legend of the Mercenaries ~Prelude~ (クリスタニア 傭兵伝説序章, Kurisutania Yōhei Densetsu Joshō) (April 1997)
- Crystania: Legend of the Sealed ~Prelude~ (クリスタニア 封印伝説序章, Fūin Densetsu Joshō Kurisutania) (August 1995)
- Crystania: Legend of the Mercenaries: Foreshadowing Dark Clouds (傭兵伝説 クリスタニア 暗雲の予兆, Yōhei Densetsu Kurisutania An'un no Yochō) (March 2001)
- Crystania: Legend of the Mercenaries: Visitors from the Past (傭兵伝説 クリスタニア 過去からの来訪者, Yōhei Densetsu Kurisutania Kako Kara no Raihō-sha) (June 2001)

In 1995 The Black Knight (黒衣の騎士, Kokui no Kishi) was released. Though technically part of the Record of Lodoss War novel series it also details Ashram leaving Lodoss island, his group's sail to Crystania and the deal with Barbas.

=== Role-playing games ===
==== Rulebooks ====
- Comp Collection 9: Crystania Companion (コンプコレクション9 クリスタニアコンパニオン, Konpu Korekushon 9 Kurisutania Konpanion) (1992, written by Ryo Mizuno and Group SNE, illustrated by Satoshi Urushihara, Go Nakano and Keiji Yamada): Includes some of the illustrations from the serialized version of the Legend of the Drifters replay (the artist was changed in the book edition).
- Crystania RPG (クリスタニアRPG, Kurisutania RPG) (1994): A boxed set containing three books: the rulebook, world guidebook, and databook. The world guidebook features a long-form campaign scenario depicting the origin of Ryutiek, the long-tailed swallow with lapis lazuli-colored plumage. (The data itself is not included in this set and remained a mystery until it was published at the end of the Legend of the Uncharted replay.)
- Booking TRPG Series: Crystania RPG (ブッキングTRPGシリーズクリスタニア, RPGBukkingu TRPG Shirīzu Kurisutania RPG) ISBN 978-4835442372 (2006): A reprint that compiles the three Crystania RPG books into one volume. It does not include supplemental data such as the divine beasts of Southern Crystania that appeared in the Legend of the Uncharted.

==== Supplements ====
- Crystania RPG Master Screen (クリスタニアRPGマスタースクリーン, Kurisutania RPG Masutā Sukrīn) (1994)
- Crystania Complete Guidebook (クリスタニア 完全ガイドブック, Kurisutania Kanzen Gaidobukku) ISBN 978-4840213523 (1999): The most recently released Crystania-related publication to date (excluding reprints of the rulebooks). It provides comprehensive coverage of characters appearing in the novels and replays.

=== Anime ===
==== Legend of Crystania: The Motion Picture ====
===== Music =====
- Opening Theme: "A Distant Prayer" (遥かな祈り, Haruka na Inori) by Hitomi Mieno
- Ending Theme: "The Map of Light" (光の地図, Hikari no Chizu) by Hitomi Mieno
- Insert Theme: "Save My Love" by Satoko Shimonari

==== Legend of Crystania: The Chaos Ring OVA ====
===== Episodes =====
No.	Title	Directed by	Animation directed by	Original release date
1	"Cave of the Sealed"; Transliteration: "Fūin no Dōkutsu" (Japanese: 封印の洞窟)	Kenichiro Watanabe	Akio Watanabe	November 21, 1996
2	"Resurrection of the Gods' King"; Transliteration: "Shin'ō Fukkatsu" (Japanese: 神王復活)	Takashi Asami	Yasuyuki Shimizu	January 22, 1997
3	"A New Beginning"; Transliteration: "Aratanaru Hajimari" (Japanese: 新たなるはじまり)	Ryutaro Nakamura	Katsumi Matsuda	April 23, 1997

===== Music =====
- Opening Theme: "The Map of Light" by Hitomi Mieno
- Ending Theme: "Save My Love" by Satoko Shimonari

==== English voice cast ====
- Adam Dudley – Rumiss
- Aimee McCormick – Rio
- Amber Allison – Aderishia
- Amy Bizjak – Jenoba, Pegleg Boy
- Bill Wise – Garudi
- Charles C. Campbell – Rome
- David Jones – Obier
- Edi Patterson – Pirotess / Sheru
- Gary Dehan – Lizard Captain
- Gray G. Haddock – Cavalry Captain, Grib
- Jason Phelps – Nasare
- Jay Sefton – Redon
- Jessica Schwartz – Raifan
- Joe Hamilton – Kwairde
- John Hoff – Matisse
- Ken Webster – Ashram
- Kevin Remington – Boakes
- Larry Goode – Lizard A, Soldier A, Villager A
- Lauri Raymond – Lady Meira
- Robert Rudie – Lord Haven
- Snowden Henry – Lizard B, Soldier B, Villager B
- Steve Sanders – Muha
- Susan Cotton – Lizard C, Soldier C, Villager C
- Tom Bartling – Lizard D, Soldier D, Villager D
- Tom Byrne – Barbas
