= Ryo Mizuno =

Japanese author and game designer (born 1963)

- 水野 良
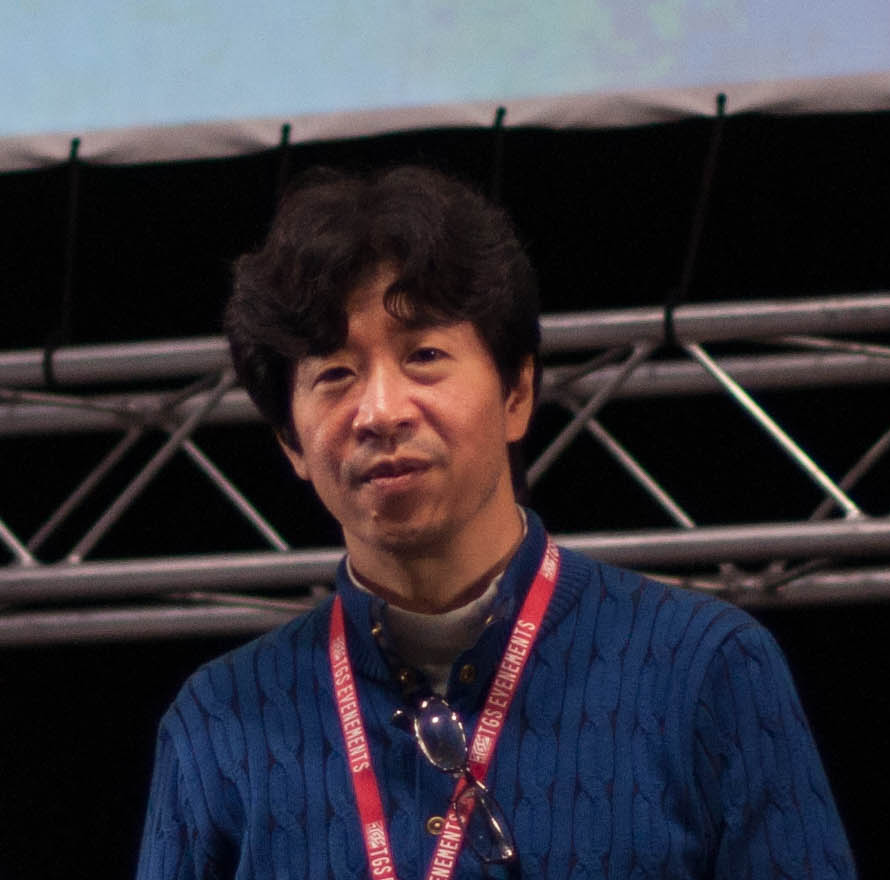
- Born: July 13, 1963 (age 62)
- Occupations: Author and game designer
- Known for: Record of Lodoss War

Ryo Mizuno (水野 良, Mizuno Ryō; born July 13, 1963) is a Japanese author and game designer. Mizuno created Record of Lodoss War, Sword World RPG, Legend of Crystania, Rune Soldier, Starship Operators, Record of Grancrest War, and was the general supervisor of Galaxy Angel.

== Work ==
=== Novels ===
- Record of Lodoss War (7 volumes, 1988–1998)
- Rune Soldier (21 volumes, 1993–2007)
- Legend of Crystania (4 volumes, 1993–1996)
- Legend of Lodoss (5 volumes, 1994–2002)
- Record of Lodoss War Next Generation (7 volumes, 1998–2006)
- Akuma ga Sasayaku (1995) in the Yōmayakō-series
- Starship Operators (6 volumes, 2001–2005)
- Galaxy Angel (2 volumes, 2002–2003)
- Blade Line: Aeshia Kenseiki (6 volumes, 2009–2012)
- Record of Grancrest War (10 volumes, 2013–2018)
- Record of Lodoss War: The Crown of the Covenant (1 volume, 2019)

=== Short story collections ===
- Record of Lodoss War (2 volumes, 1996/2000)
- 7 volumes in the series Sword World Tampen-shū
- Legend of Crystania (2 volumes, 1995/1997)

=== Pen-&-Paper-role playing ===
- Sword World RPG
- Record of Lodoss War Companion
- Crystania Companion
- Crystania RPG

=== Other ===
- Rune Soldier (Manga): Text
- Galaxy Angel Parody (Manga): Text
- Record of Lodoss War: The Demon of Flame (Manga): Text
- Record of Lodoss War: Chronicles of the Heroic Knight (TV): Idea
- Record of Lodoss War: Deedlit's Tale (Manga): Text
- Record of Lodoss War: The Lady of Pharis (Manga): Text
