= Rune Soldier =

Japanese light novel series and its adaptations

- Cover of the first light novel of Rune Soldier as published by Fujimi Shobo

魔法戦士リウイ (Mahō Senshi Riui)
- Genre: Adventure, comedy, fantasy
- Light novel
- Written by: Ryo Mizuno
- Published by: Fujimi Shobo
- Imprint: Fujimi Fantasia Bunko
- Magazine: Dragon Magazine
- Original run: February 3, 1993 – June 20, 2012
- Volumes: 21
- Manga
- Written by: Ryo Mizuno
- Illustrated by: Jun Sasameyuki
- Published by: Fujimi Shobo
- English publisher: NA: ADV Manga
- Magazine: Monthly Dragon Junior
- Original run: June 26, 1999 – February 27, 2003
- Volumes: 6
- Anime television series
- Directed by: Yoshitaka Koyama
- Written by: Katsuhiko Chiba
- Music by: Kenji Kawai
- Studio: J.C.Staff
- Licensed by: NA: ADV Films
- Original network: Wowow
- English network: ZA: Animax
- Original run: April 3, 2001 – September 18, 2001
- Episodes: 24
- Manga
- Written by: Ryo Mizuno
- Illustrated by: Kōji Hasegawa
- Published by: Kadokawa Shoten
- Magazine: Famitsu Comic Clear
- Original run: July 8, 2016 – November 23, 2018
- Volumes: 5
- icon

Rune Soldier (Japanese: 魔法戦士リウイ, Hepburn: Mahō Senshi Riui; lit. "Magical Soldier Louie") is a Japanese light novel series by Ryo Mizuno, which features the apprentice wizard Louie as the hero. The series takes place on the continent of Alecrast on the world called Forcelia, and is related to the Sword World RPG. It is a sibling series to Record of Lodoss War (also by Mizuno), taking place on a continent north of Lodoss Island.

An anime television series adaptation animated by J.C.Staff aired on Wowow from April to September 2001. There are also two manga adaptations.

== Plot ==
Set in the kingdom of Orphan, a land of swords and magic ruled by the Hero King, the story follows Louie, a physically strong but unconventional mage who recently graduated from the mage's guild. Despite his magical training, Louie is prone to drinking, chasing women, and getting into fights, instead of behaving like a typical wizard, which leaves him without a purpose in life.

His circumstances change when three adventurers, a priestess named Melissa, a fighter named Genie, and a thief named Mirelle, reluctantly accept him into their party after a divine revelation leads Melissa to believe Louie is her destined hero. Although skeptical of his abilities and behavior, the group sets out together on various quests, exploring ruins, battling monsters, and taking on jobs as adventurers.

== Characters ==
Louie (リウイ)
A member of the Magician's Guild in Ohfun and the adopted son of Carwes the guild's master. Muscular and a little on the dumb side; Louie is prone to getting drunk in bars, chasing after girls, and brawling when he should be studying his magic. As a result, he tends to use brute force instead of magic, much to the chagrin of his companions (for example, on his first adventure, Louie lost his temper when a troop of goblins clubbed him on the head and then broke his wand when he used it to club them back). Despite his shortcomings as a wizard, Louie possesses a strong sense of justice and is unfailingly loyal to those he considers his friends. Louie's stupidity mostly results as a lack of planning and forethought, he's actually a lot smarter than he usually appears to be, often figuring things out that others overlook. While it isn't mentioned in the anime (other than Louie's strong resemblance to him) it is strongly hinted in the manga that Louie is the illegitimate son of the King. Voiced by: Katsuyuki Konishi (Japanese); Jason Douglas (English)
Melissa (メリッサ)
Adventurer and priestess to Mylee, god of war. Daughter of an earl in Ramliearth. Naive and idealistic, Melissa's dream is to serve a chosen hero of her patron god which of course causes her great despair when Mylee reveals her destined champion is Louie (in the anime she frequently says "This is against my will" several times an episode). Throughout the course of the series, Melissa gradually begins to realize that perfect heroes don't exist and by the end of the series not only fully accepts Louie as her chosen hero but may also have developed feelings for him as well. Voiced by: Kikuko Inoue (Japanese); Shelley Calene-Black (English)
Genie (ジーニ)
Adventurer and former soldier of Ohfun. She has a rather cool demeanor but Louie's stupid behavior tends to push her to the point of violence. A highly adept warrior, Genie's favorite weapon is a broadsword as big as herself and likewise is strong enough to slug it out on the same level as Louie. As the story progresses, Genie comes to respect Louie as a friend when she finds that he, unlike most men, doesn't look down on her because she is a woman and even teaches him basic sword fighting. Voiced by: Minami Takayama (Japanese); Christine M. Auten (English)
Merrill (ミレル)
Adventurer, thief and part-time job worker with a fanatical obsession for money. When not adventuring, Merrill is either raising funds for the next adventure through various part-time jobs or looking at any scheme to get rich, including running booths at various events in Ohfun. Like Genie, Merril is driven crazy by Louie's behavior and frequently explodes in violence at him. Voiced by: Tomoko Kawakami (Japanese); Allison Keith (English)
Ila (アイラ)
Member of the Magician's Guild and Louie's friend. Despite many attempts to get Louie on a date, especially considering her rather voluptuous frame, their relationship remains platonic and open much to her dismay. Although highly knowledgeable in magic theory and magical item lore (her chief area of study), Aila herself claims to be inferior to Louie in raw magical prowess. She also tends to go to pieces and pass out whenever trouble surfaces on adventures she tags along with. In the manga, Aila's character is more sultry than in the anime and she especially enjoys getting Louie flustered by flirting with him. Voiced by: Akiko Yajima (Japanese); Jenny Strader (English)
Celecia
A beautiful elf girl the group met while journeying through a forest. Voiced by: Fumiko Orikasa (Japanese); Kelli Cousins (English)
Anna Voiced by: Miyu Matsuki (Japanese); Hilary Haag (English)
Gannet Voiced by: Ryoka Yuzuki (Japanese); Jessica Boone (English)
Joan Voiced by: Ryoko Nagata (Japanese); Nora Stein (English)
Three young teenage priestesses of Mylee that hold Melissa in esteem. They have a low opinion of Louie and see him as a burden to Melissa during the entirety of the anime series. They don't appear in the manga.
Dardanel
Littler's aide and regent. An aristocrat from the days of the old Fan Kingdom. It is unknown whether he ranks higher or lower than Prime Minister Rijal. He encourages Littler to become king.

In the anime version, he is the mastermind behind a plot to use Littler to overthrow King Rijal and restore an oligarchy of the nobles of the old Fan Kingdom.

== Media ==
=== Light novels ===
First series

No.	Release date	ISBN
1	October 21, 1998	4-8291-2845-3
2	February 18, 1999	4-8291-2867-4
3	June 14, 1999	4-8291-2891-7
4	December 13, 1999	4-8291-2932-8
5	April 10, 2000	4-8291-2959-X
6	August 25, 2000	4-8291-2994-8
7	March 16, 2001	4-8291-1337-5
8	July 19, 2001	4-8291-1369-3
9	February 20, 2002	4-8291-1405-3
0	March 20, 2003	4-8291-1500-9
A side-story about Genie, Merrill, and Melissa before meeting Louie.

Second series

Rune Soldier Louie – Regional Novels
Title	Release date	ISBN	Notes
Rune Soldier in the Kingdom of Swords: Sword World Novel (剣の国の魔法戦士 ソード・ワールド・ノベル, Ken no Kuni no Mahō Senshi Sōdo Wārudo Noberu)	February 3, 1993	4-8291-2477-6	Original edition
Rune Soldier in the Kingdom of Swords (魔法戦士リウイ 剣の国の魔法戦士, Mahō Senshi Riui Ken no Kuni no Mahō Senshi)	September 25, 2001 (Released September 20)	4-8291-1372-3	Revised edition
Rune Soldier in the Kingdom at the Lakeside (湖岸の国の魔法戦士, Kogan no Kuni no Mahō Senshi)	August 25, 1997 (Released August 20)	4-8291-2767-8	Original edition
Rune Soldier in the Kingdom at the Lakeside (魔法戦士リウイ 湖岸の国の魔法戦士, Mahō Senshi Riui Kogan no Kuni no Mahō Senshi)	September 25, 2001 (Released September 17)	4-8291-1373-1	Revised edition
Rune Soldier in the Kingdom of Sand Dust (砂塵の国の魔法戦士, Sajin no Kuni no Mahō Senshi)	September 25, 2003 (Released September 20)	4-8291-1556-4	Original edition

Third series

No.	Title	Release date	ISBN
1	Sword of Faram: Rune Soldier in the Kingdom of Sages; Mahō Senshi Riui: Fāramu no Ken: Kenja no Kuni no Mahō Senshi (魔法戦士リウイ ファーラムの剣 賢者の国の魔法戦士)	August 25, 2004 (Released August 20)	4-8291-1633-1
2	Sword of Faram: Rune Soldier on the Accursed Island; Mahō Senshi Riui: Fāramu no Ken: Jubaku no Shima no Mahō Senshi (魔法戦士リウイ ファーラムの剣 呪縛の島の魔法戦士)	March 25, 2005 (Released March 19)	4-8291-1698-6
Crossover with Record of Lodoss War
3	Sword of Faram: Rune Soldier in the Pastoral Land; Mahō Senshi Riui: Fāramu no Ken: Bokka no Kuni no Mahō Senshi (魔法戦士リウイ ファーラムの剣 牧歌の国の魔法戦士)	February 25, 2006 (Released February 18)	4-8291-1798-2
4	Sword of Faram: Rune Soldier in the Kingdom of Steel; Mahō Senshi Riui: Fāramu no Ken: Hagane no Kuni no Mahō Senshi (魔法戦士リウイ ファーラムの剣 鋼の国の魔法戦士)	December 25, 2006 (Released December 20)	4-8291-1884-9
5	Sword of Faram: Rune Soldier on the Island of Gods; Mahō Senshi Riui: Fāramu no Ken: Kamiyo no Shima no Mahō Senshi (魔法戦士リウイ ファーラムの剣 神代の島の魔法戦士)	December 25, 2007 (Released December 20)	978-4-8291-1970-9
6	Sword of Faram: Rune Soldier on the Sea of Storms; Mahō Senshi Riui: Fāramu no Ken: Arashi no Umi no Mahō Senshi (魔法戦士リウイ ファーラムの剣 嵐の海の魔法戦士)	August 25, 2008 (Released August 20)	978-4-8291-3316-3
7	Sword of Faram: Rune Soldier on the Island of Smokefire; Mahō Senshi Riui: Fāramu no Ken: Enka no Shima no Mahō Senshi (魔法戦士リウイ ファーラムの剣 煙火の島の魔法戦士)	January 25, 2011 (Released January 20)	978-4-8291-3537-2
8	Sword of Faram: Rune Soldier in the Land of Runes; Mahō Senshi Riui: Fāramu no Ken: Mahō no Kuni no Mahō Senshi (魔法戦士リウイ ファーラムの剣 魔法の国の魔法戦士)	June 25, 2012 (Released June 20)	978-4-8291-3673-7

=== Manga ===
Originally released by Kadokawa Shoten, the series was licensed by ADV Manga, who only released five out of the six volumes.

No.	Original release date	Original ISBN	English release date	English ISBN
1	December 24, 1999	4-04-712214-9	March 23, 2003	978-1413900859
2	July 28, 2000	4-04-712242-4	July 6, 2004	978-1413901054
3	June 28, 2001	4-04-712272-6	October 12, 2004	978-1413901238
4	January 30, 2002	4-04-712291-2	January 25, 2005	978-1413902365
5	September 25, 2002	4-04-712309-9	May 24, 2005	978-1413902723
6	May 28, 2003	4-04-712331-5	–	—

=== Second manga ===
Written by Panda Ozawa and illustrated by Koji Hasegawa, the manga began serialisation in July 2016 on Kadokawa's Clear Comic website. The series ended with the last chapter being published on November 23, 2018.

No.	Release date	ISBN
1	February 28, 2017	4-04-734475-3
2	August 10, 2017	4-04-734702-7
3	January 15, 2018	4-04-734948-8
4	July 14, 2018	4-04-735211-X
5	January 15, 2019	4-04-735451-1

=== Anime ===
The Rune Soldier anime consists of 24 episodes. The episodes are either a stand-alone adventure, or a story arc consisting of multiple episodes. In general the plot of each episode or story arc revolves around the group looking for, finding, and participating in an adventure. Probably due to interpretation or stylistic differences most episodes have a verbal spoken and written name that does not match exactly. The series was licensed by ADV Films for an English release.

The anime had an NTSC release of September 13, 2005, by Section 23. There were six discs total. In Indonesia, it was broadcast by Trans TV and TV7.

No.	Title	Original air date
1	"The Hero Descends"; Transliteration: "Yūsha Kōrin" (Japanese: 勇者降臨)	April 3, 2001
The episode introduces the main characters, beginning with Melissa, Genie, and Merrill. While investigating a ruin they indicate their need for a magician to join them to open a magically sealed door. Three days later they have traveled to the town of Ohfun. Merrill and Genie individually meet Louie with mixed results. Merrill believes him to be a pervert because he was being chased by a group of angry women and that he falls, while thanking her, and pulls her shorts down. Genie meets Louie while she is being confronted by a group of their rival adventurers. They claim she has insulted them by running into one of them and not apologizing. Louie appears, impossibly wedged in a slight opening between the town wall and a building. He precedes to attack the three men using his fists. Genie sees Louie as a reckless thrill seeker. Later, Melissia, Merrill, and Genie have met up at a tavern. Merrill reveals she has learned of a pub that magicians frequent. The next night, they meet up at the pub, and approach Ila. She in turn introduces them to Louie. All three refuse Louie in joining them. Ila and Louie inform them that Louie is likely the only magician willing to join them. As Louie tries to convince them of his worth, he irritates Genie and she confronts him. He refuses to back down and pulls out a magical device, that he drops and damages the pub. Luckily he was the only person left in the pub as everyone else fled. Later still the three girls meet at apparently a new tavern, they are drinking and angrily discuss Louie's incompetence. Melissia then reveals she will be undergoing her "Sacred Ritual of Revealing," the next day. This is a Mylee rite that reveals a Champion to whom the priestess must serve. She envisions a dashing knight, and gets lost in her daydream of their adventures together. The next day opens on Melissia giving a sermon on Champions and heroes. She then speaks with Anna, Ganet, and Joan, three younger priestesses who believe she will be shown her champion. She calmly advises them that it may not be successful, and then when alone giggles and sings about getting her champion. The next scene shows Louie being released from jail and we find his adoptive father Master Carwes, arranged for his early release. He goes to the magician's guild and tries to attend classes but cannot get the idea of adventuring out of his mind. He and Iila talk in his dorm room, about his apparent lack of talent and dedication to his studies. As they speak about the three adventurers, they both conclude that the adventurers are looking for a magician to complete their group. Louie leaps to the conclusion that they want his help, but cannot ask him directly. He tells Ila the only member of the group he knows how to find is Melissia since she is a Mylee priestess. Genie and Merrill meet up at Genie's home outside Ohfun and their conversation turns to Louie. They decide to go see Melissia to see how her "Ritual of Revealing" has gone. Melissia is shown entering a sacred room of the Mylee temple with Chief Priestess Jenny officiating the rite. Melissia now alone and nude enters a pool of waist high water facing a statue of Mylee. To her delight, the deity speaks to her stating the next person she sees will be her champion. During the rite Louie arrives at the temple and is driven off by the three young priestesses. He then meets Genie and Merrill and after Genie pulls her sword on him, he runs away with Merrill and Genie in pursuit. As he navigates the temple he is constantly confronted by and attacked by a small army of young priestesses. He finally evades them and climbs to the top of the temple. Genie and Merrill are already there and begin to attack him. Louie pulls out his magic wand and begins to cast a spell, which backfires and destroys part of the temple roof. He falls through and lands in front of Melissia. Melissia screams, realizing Louie is her destined champion.
2	"The First Experience"; Transliteration: "Shotaiken" (Japanese: 初体験)	April 10, 2001
The girls confront Louie in Genie's home and Melissia reveals her revelation that Louie is her champion, much to her despair. Even Louie doubts the validity of this revelation. He then uses it to convince the girls to take him on their adventure. Melissia indicates she is forced to go with him if it his wish. In preparing for the adventure Louie receives a charm for his magic wand, from his adoptive father Master Carwes, and sword training from Genie. Upon leaving for the adventure Louie receives what will become a recurring task of carrying the party's equipment and provisions. Upon reaching the ruins Louie is left to move rubble from the entrance, only Genie helps out with moving the final, and largest stone. Louie then attempts to open the sealed door with his magic, but is forced to read some cheat note to complete it. Upon entering and exploring the underground ruins, the group come to a dead end room and begin to search for secret doors, Louie, by luck alone, effortlessly finds a hidden door, and envisions finding a mountain of treasure that will earn him the affections of all three girls. Instead he finds a small group of monsters called goblins. He tries to flee and rejoin the girls who were on the other side of the room. When he is struck on the back of the head he loses control of himself and begins to brawl with the goblins. While he successfully defeats them, the girls have a running dialogue of their despair at Louie not accepting his role as their magician, instead of their fighter. Louis breaks his magic wand by using it like a club. In the end they find no treasure, but Louie comments on his happiness to have been on the adventure. This provokes Merrill to punch him.
3	"The Big Scuffle"; Transliteration: "Dai Rantō" (Japanese: 大乱闘)	April 17, 2001
The group returns to Ohfun. The girls are still angry from not finding any treasure and use Louie's needing a wand to use magic to abandon him until he can find a replacement wand. The girls are individually shown complaining about Louie to people they know in town. They meet up an inn and Ila and Louie meet them. Ila proceeds to give Louie three useless magical items: a cloak that can make him invisible, but is too small, a box containing an illusion of a cooked chicken, and a whistle than can call demons to your location, but does not allow you to control them. When Merrill comments on how useless each one is, Ila comments that they would be more useful than non-existent teammates. This angers the three girls and Louie, perceiving their hostility, quickly excuses himself and Ila. This leads to the girls "grudgingly" helping Louie out when he decides to stock up on gear and get the wood required for his new wand. In the end, not being able to live with Louie's probable death upon entering the Phantom Forest alone hanging on their collective conscience, they decide to accompany him.
4	"The Phantom Forest"; Transliteration: "Yōma no Mori" (Japanese: 妖魔の森)	April 24, 2001
The group has made their way into the forest and are finishing up a group of monsters summoned when Louie blew the whistle. After cleaning up and preparing to obtain the wood he needs, Louie notices a presence and gives chase to it, despite the girls' protests. A chase ensues, and Louie is soon captured by the presence – a female elf named Ceresia. Breaking free of his bonds, he turns the tables on her and captures her, after which the team questions her. Louie's simple nature soon finds the party prisoners in the elven village whose lands the forest is a part of. Not wanting to see what vile fate the elves have in store for them, and to show them that humans are not monsters the elves thought them to be, Louie blows the whistle, summoning more monsters, and causing the village to panic. The party takes advantage of the confusion by breaking out, and instead of running for it Louie beats the summoned monsters with a wild boar carcass and later with his fists. They bid Ceresia farewell and return to Ohfun.
5	"Inexperienced Extracurricular Activities"; Transliteration: "Aoi Kagai Jugyō" (Japanese: 青い課外授業)	May 5, 2001
One of Melissa's duties as a priestess of Mylee is to help train the young priestesses. Melissa goes to some ruins with 3 trainees to help them get experience in defeating monsters. Merill and Genie decide to come along for support and Louie, unable to resist the pull of adventure, tags along too. It turns out the ruins are infested with zombies, and once inside the floor collapses and Melissa and Louie get stuck together. They eventually find their way out, and the rest of the group leaves Louie floundering trying to find his magic wand.
6	"Die For Love?"; Transliteration: "Ai no Tame ni...Shisu?" (Japanese: 愛のために...死す？)	May 8, 2001
Melissa's headaches double when a man shows up at the Mylee shrine professing his undying love. It's Conrad, an heir to the kingdom of Ramliearth and Melissa's old fiancé. Melissa puts Louie on the spot, saying that if Conrad can beat him in a duel, she'll return to Ramliearth. If not, Conrad can never come near her again. Unfortunately, Conrad has become a master swordsman. With only a week to train, it becomes obvious that Louie is the one in danger. Melissa tries to stop the fight, but it's too late. All she can do is watch and pray.
7	"Merill's Jar"; Transliteration: "Mereru no Tsubo" (Japanese: ミレルの壷)	May 15, 2001
Merill becomes so obsessed with a jar of money that she has Louie create a golem to protect it. It goes out of control, so Merill and Louie try to stop it before it throws it into a bottomless hot spring. However despite their best efforts, the jar is lost in the "bottomless" pit, and thus the group are poor once again.
8	"A Tearful Festival of Mylee"; Transliteration: "Namida no Mairī Matsuri" (Japanese: 涙のマイリー祭り)	May 22, 2001
The townspeople in Ohfun are busy preparing for the Mylee Appreciation Festival, which happens every five years. Meanwhile, Louie has been so engrossed in adventures, he forgot to do his homework. His instructor grounds him until it's complete. Louie works frantically to finish his tasks and barely makes it to the festival. At the festival, Melissa's three fans plot to embarrass Louie in front of her, but they end up dragging in Merrill and Genie instead. When the smoke clears, Melissa steps down and admits that Louie is her champion.
9	"What Comes in Summer"; Transliteration: "Manatsu ni Otozureshi Mono" (Japanese: 真夏に訪れし者)	May 29, 2001
It's the middle of the summer and Louie has taken a job as a porter. Ila takes advantage of this, and while out with her on the job, he notices it begin to snow. Returning to the Guild, Ila gets a letter from Master Banarl, a magician who retired to the Tower of the Four Great Magics to complete his weather control research. He asks the group to go with her to the tower to investigate. Along the way, the group meets the elf, Celecia, who joins them. But the road won't be easy with blizzards and demented nature spirits standing in their path.
10	"The Tower of Four Great Magics"; Transliteration: "Shi Dai Majutsu-shi no Tō" (Japanese: 四大魔術師の塔)	June 5, 2001
Overcoming the fierce snowstorm, the group finally arrives at the Tower of the Four Great Magics. At the entrance, they are greeted by a Flesh Golem, the gate guard resurrected by Master Banarl. Despite some difficulties, they kill the golem and make their way into the lab. There, they find the magician's frozen remains along with a horde of vicious Flau, mad ice spirits that freeze everything they touch. The girls create a diversion as Louie heads to the main control panel. When the Flau attack, Louie makes one last gamble.
11	"A True Hero Appears?"; Transliteration: "Shin no Yūsha Tōjō?" (Japanese: 真の勇者登場？)	June 12, 2001
Based on information bought in a bar, Louie's group heads toward a mountain where a crystal miner named Gonga has supposedly been lost. On the way, they run into Melissa's rival, Isabel, and her team: Renard, Isabel's new champion; Jakinson, a swordsman; and Lily, a Faris priestess. When both teams find they have the same goal, the rescue turns into a race. Out of breath, the teams agree to work together. They find Gonga in a cave, but he refuses to leave without a very large crystal. With the cave ready to collapse, Louie goes in after it.
12	"Flowers of a Moonlit Night"; Transliteration: "Tsukiyo no Hana" (Japanese: 月夜の花)	June 19, 2001
During Headmaster Carwes' absence Master Foltess takes charge of the Magician's Guild. Delighting in his new authority, he delivers a long, boring speech to a captive audience of students. After class, Louie and Ila head to the bar to meet with Louie's team. A little girl named Catherine appears, piggy bank in hand. She wants to hire them to find a "Senian Flower" for her ill grandmother. It's a rare flower not native to Ohfun. Louie finds the Guild has one in its greenhouse. He begs Master Foltess to borrow it, but he refuses. That's never stopped Louie before.
13	"The Fugue of the Female Warrior"; Transliteration: "Onna Senshi no Tonsō-Kyoku (Fūga)" (Japanese: 女戦士の遁走曲（フーガ）)	June 26, 2001
Louie and the girls meet Barb, captain of the Ohfun Royal Guard, while treasure hunting in the western reaches of the kingdom. Barb warns the group of strange activity along the border, but Genie assures him their adventure is nowhere near there. The next day, strange mercenaries attack the adventures. Genie offers to buy time for the other three so they can run to Barb's post and alert him. Melissa and Merrill go, but Louie stays, enraging Genie. Tempers flare, exploding into a fistfight between the two.
14	"Flower Vendor and Flower Bride"; Transliteration: "Hanauri to Hanayome" (Japanese: 花売りと花嫁)	July 3, 2001
While selling flowers, Merrill is accosted by a mysterious young man. Catching her off guard, he kidnaps her and takes her to his home. He turns out to be William Wilder, heir to one of Ohfun's richest families, and he asks Merrill to marry him! Louie, Genie, and Melissa hear the good news, but something is amiss. After a little snooping, Louie finds out that William has mistaken Merrill for another girl who saved William's life in the mountains. It's up to the group to find the real girl and make sure true love really does conquer all!
15	"Vacation by the Lake"; Transliteration: "Kohan no Bakansu" (Japanese: 湖畔のバカンス)	July 10, 2001
Coming home from an adventure, the group runs into Ila. It seems that she had been waiting for them at her parents' lake house when she heard they would be nearby. Since the last adventure fell through, everyone decides to take a break and spend some time at the beautiful lakeside. But, when Meilssa hears of a "Guardian of the Lake" terrorizing the fishermen, she sees the perfect opportunity for Louie to prove himself. Louie, on the other hand, just wants to fish. Interests collide when Louie hooks the "Guardian" with some unique bait.
16	"The Conspiracy of the Darkness"; Transliteration: "Yami no Naka no Inbō" (Japanese: 闇の中の陰謀)	July 17, 2001
Urged by Merrill, the team heads to a ruined estate to search for treasure. There, they meet Isabel and her team. The swordsman, Jakinson, recounts some history to discredit Merrill's claim, but the two teams decide to investigate anyway, hoping to gain some adventure from the outing. They find it in spades. The adventurers fight their way through hordes of monsters to the heart of the ruin's basement, where they discover a farm for magical creatures. The ancient magic, said to be lost ages ago, is very much alive and well – and very deadly.
17	"The Fighter Louie"; Transliteration: "Kentō-shi Riui" (Japanese: 拳闘士リウイ)	July 24, 2001
While visiting a small town, Louie and the others hear of a fighting tournament. It's a reunion of sorts with appearances by Conrad and Renard, for both are competing. Conrad boasts that he will win first prize as a wedding gift for Melissa. Once again, Louie is called upon to defend Melissa's honor. At the same event, Merrill overhears a plot to assassinate the tournament sponsor. She attracts the attention of the plotters, but escapes...sort of. Stuck at the bottom of a well, Merrill must find a way to send out the message before she runs out of time.
18	"Transform X5"; Transliteration: "Henshin x5" (Japanese: 変身×5)	July 31, 2001
While helping Ila organize her magic item collection, Louie comes across a strange item. He plays around with it and ends up hurting himself. When Ila scolds him, Louie leaves in a huff. Ila toys with the item herself and ends up turning Louie into a woman! At first, he panics, but soon her takes advantage of this perfect opportunity and rushes into the women's sauna. But it doesn't stop there – when Melissa and Genie find Louie, he's an old man! With Ila and the item nowhere in sight, Louie's talent for embarrassing Melissa gets to shine.
19	"Oh My, Home!"; Transliteration: "Ō・Mai・Hōmu!" (Japanese: オー・マイ・ホーム!)	August 7, 2001
One night, Merrill's shack by the river gets swept away in a flood. Disheartend, Merrill decides to buy a house with the small savings in her pot. Her despair turns to joy when she snags a house at a bargain price. The house needs some touch-up, but Merrill is proud of her new home. Alas, misfortune strikes again as the house turns out to be haunted by an army of ghosts who have nothing better to do at night than beat each other up. With her home falling apart, Merrill enlists the aid of her friends.
20	"Sweet Wine of Victory!"; Transliteration: "Shōri no Bishu" (Japanese: 勝利の美酒)	August 21, 2001
Louie has been getting intensive sword training from Genie ever since he joined the team, but his skill has yet to improve. After a long training session, they go to the group's favorite bar, where Melissa tells them about the annual wine-carrying race. Seeing the chance to defeat Genie, Louie goads her into racing. On the day of the race, the three run into Conrad, who plans to use his horse in the race. Genie assures Louie that Conrad will have to ditch his horse in the rugged mountains, but the sneaky knight seems suspiciously confident. Conrad approaches a large gorge & he falls off the horse while attempting to jump across. While Merrill is in the lead, Louie and Genie keep arguing about who is going to win. Conrad swimming through the river heads to a wooden bridge. Conrad tries to break the bridge so no one can pass him. Merrill throws a knife near Conrad's face. He takes her knife and cuts the bridge with Louie and Genie on it. Maril kicks Conrad off the bridge and he grabs her foot. "Splash!" Later on, the two (Genie and Louie) have a fierce fight over a wine bottle. And the winner is Conrad's horse. Fireworks go off.
21	"Melissa the Working Girl"; Transliteration: "Kinrō Shōjo Merissa" (Japanese: 勤労少女メリッサ)	August 28, 2001
Poor Merrill. If it's not one thing, it's another. This time, she's come down with a fever. Merrill doggedly tries to return to work, but Melissa convinces her to take a sick day by offering to fill in on the job. "Job" quickly becomes "jobs" as Melissa goes through Merrill's hectic schedule of part-time professions – and gets fired from every one. In tears, she retires alone to a bar with one job left to accomplish. But Louie and Ila aren't far behind, and Melissa learns how to get by with a little help from her friends.
22	"The Rebel Army Appears"; Transliteration: "Hanran-gun Genru" (Japanese: 反乱軍現る)	September 4, 2001
The hostile army gathering on the western border invades Ohfun. King Rijarl musters his own army and sets out with Headmaster Carwes and High Priestess Jenny, leaving a council of ministers in charge of the capital. In class, Ila informs Louie that the paper he asked her to translate is a list of ingredients for a powerful magical creature. But Louie has little time to ponder this mystery as he is whisked away by Master Foltess for a little work-study. There, Louie uncovers a treasonous plot – in which young Lily is playing an integral part.
23	"The Rule-Breaking Women"; Transliteration: "Okita Yaburi no Onna-tachi" (Japanese: 掟やぶりの女たち)	September 11, 2001
After being thrown into a pit for his discovery, Louie manages to climb out and escape. With an army of mercenaries on his tail, he heads deep into the woods...only to get lost. Meanwhile, the girls have become prisoners in their own city when the regent, Lord Dardanel, declares martial law. Concerned for Louie, they begin to suspect that something is rotten in the state of Ohfun. Suddenly, the alarm is raised. When Ila confirms the cause of the alarm is Louie, the girls decide to take the law into their own hands.
24	"Louie Punch"; Transliteration: "Riui Panchi!!!!" (Japanese: リウイパンチ!!!!)	September 18, 2001
Merrill, Genie, and Melissa break into the castle. Fighting their way through, Genie holds off a crowd of soldiers while Melissa and Merrill go on to confront Lily. However, the swordswoman isn't alone for long—Isabel and Jakinson come crashing through the gates to lend their support. Deep inside, Louie find an imprisoned Renard, whom he frees before continuing on his mission to give Lord Dardanel a well-deserved punch in the face. But Dardanel still has a trump card left to play. Will Louie and the girls be able to bring justice for king and country?
