= Record of Lodoss War =

Franchise of fantasy novels by Ryo Mizuno

- Cover of the first volume of the novel adaptation

ロードス島戦記 (Rōdosu-tō Senki)
- Genre: Sword and sorcery
- Novel series

Record of Lodoss War RPG Replay
- Written by: Ryo Mizuno
- Illustrated by: Yutaka Izubuchi; Retsu Tateo (The Wandering Nobleman's Endless Journey Home)
- Published by: Kadokawa Shoten
- Imprint: Kadokawa Sneaker Bunko
- Magazine: Comptiq
- Original run: September 1986 – September 1989
- Volumes: 3 + 2 extra
- Novel series
- Written by: Ryo Mizuno
- Illustrated by: Yutaka Izubuchi; Masato Natsumoto (The Black Knight second edition)
- Published by: Kadokawa Shoten
- English publisher: NA: Seven Seas Entertainment
- Imprint: Kadokawa Bunko (first volume of the first edition); Kadokawa Sneaker Bunko; Kadokawa Novels (The Black Knight second edition)
- Original run: April 10, 1988 – March 27, 1993
- Volumes: 7 + 2 side stories
- Original video animation
- Directed by: Akinori Nagaoka (#1 & 12–13, chief); Shigeto Makino (#2); Katsuhisa Yamada (#3); Ryū Taiji (#4, 7, 9–11); Kazunori Mizuno (#5); Akio Sakai (#6); Hirotsugu Kawasaki (#8)
- Produced by: Masao Maruyama; Noriaki Ikeda (#1–7)
- Written by: Mami Watanabe
- Music by: Mitsuo Hagita
- Studio: Madhouse
- Licensed by: NA: Central Park Media (former); Funimation (current)
- Released: June 30, 1990 – November 20, 1991
- Runtime: 25–30 minutes
- Episodes: 13
- Anime television series

Chronicles of the Heroic Knight
- Directed by: Koichi Chigira
- Produced by: Kinya Watanabe
- Written by: Katsumi Hasegawa
- Music by: where2
- Studio: AIC
- Licensed by: NA: Central Park Media (former); Funimation (current)
- Original network: TV Tokyo
- English network: ZA: Animax
- Original run: April 1, 1998 – September 30, 1998
- Episodes: 27
Further information
Manga
The Lady of Pharis
| Written by | Ryo Mizuno |
| Illustrated by | Akihiro Yamada |
| Published by | Kadokawa Shoten |
| English publisher | AUS: Madman Entertainment; NA: CPM Manga |
| Imprint | Dragon Comics (first edition, first volume only); Newtype 100% Comics (second edition) |
| Magazine | Marukatsu PC Engine (1991–1993); The Sneaker (1999–2001) |
| Original run | April 30, 1991 – April 28, 2001 |
| Volumes | 2 |
Manga
The Demon of Flame
| Written by | Ryo Mizuno |
| Illustrated by | Ayumi Saito |
| Published by | Kadokawa Shoten |
| Imprint | Comp Comics (first edition); Dragon Comics (second edition) |
| Original run | 1993 – 1994 |
| Volumes | 2 |
Novel series
Legend of Lodoss RPG Replay
| Written by | Ryo Mizuno |
| Illustrated by | Retsu Tateo; Tatsumi Minegishi |
| Published by | Kadokawa Shoten |
| Imprint | Kadokawa Sneaker Bunko |
| Magazine | Comptiq |
| Original run | August 1993 – October 1996 |
| Volumes | 3 |
Novel series
Legend of Lodoss
| Written by | Ryo Mizuno |
| Illustrated by | Akihiro Yamada |
| Published by | Kadokawa Shoten |
| Imprint | Kadokawa Sneaker Bunko; Kadokawa Mini Bunko (Prince of the Sun, Princess of the Moon) |
| Original run | August 8, 1994 – October 31, 2002 |
| Volumes | 5 + extra |
Manga
The Grey Witch
| Written by | Ryo Mizuno |
| Illustrated by | Yoshihiko Ochi |
| Published by | Kadokawa Shoten |
| English publisher | AUS: Madman Entertainment; NA: CPM Manga |
| Imprint | Dragon Comics (first edition, first two volumes only); Kadokawa Comics Ace (second edition) |
| Original run | 1994 – 1998 |
| Volumes | 3 |
Manga
Welcome to Lodoss Island!
| Written by | Rei Hyakuyashiki |
| Published by | Kadokawa Shoten |
| English publisher | NA: CPM Manga |
| Imprint | Comics Ace Extra |
| Magazine | Monthly Shonen Ace |
| Original run | December 1995 – April 1999 |
| Volumes | 3 |
Manga
Chronicles of the Heroic Knight
| Written by | Ryo Mizuno |
| Illustrated by | Masato Natsumoto |
| Published by | Kadokawa Shoten |
| English publisher | AUS: Madman Entertainment; NA: CPM Manga |
| Imprint | Kadokawa Comics Ace |
| Magazine | Monthly Shōnen Ace |
| Original run | 1997 – 2000 |
| Volumes | 6 |
Manga
Deedlit's Tale
| Written by | Ryo Mizuno |
| Illustrated by | Setsuko Yoneyama |
| Published by | Kadokawa Shoten |
| English publisher | AUS: Madman Entertainment; NA: CPM Manga |
| Imprint | Asuka Comics DX |
| Magazine | Monthly Asuka Fantasy DX |
| Published | 1998 |
| Volumes | 2 |
Anime film
Welcome to Lodoss Island!
| Directed by | Koichi Chigira |
| Written by | Katsumi Hasegawa |
| Music by | Yusuke Nakamura |
| Studio | AIC |
| Released | April 25, 1998 |
| Runtime | 35 minutes |
Novel series
Next Generation
| Written by | Ryo Mizuno |
| Illustrated by | Yutaka Izubuchi (first edition of the Prelude and the first novel); Haruhiko Mikimoto |
| Published by | Kadokawa Shoten |
| Imprint | Kadokawa Mini Bunko (Prelude); Kadokawa Sneaker Bunko |
| Magazine | The Sneaker |
| Original run | May 23, 1998 – November 30, 2006 |
| Volumes | 6 + prelude |
Manga
The Grey Witch
| Written by | Ryo Mizuno |
| Illustrated by | Tomomasa Takuma |
| Published by | Kadokawa Shoten |
| Imprint | Kadokawa Comics Ace |
| Magazine | Comptiq |
| Original run | December 10, 2013 – April 10, 2015 |
| Volumes | 3 |
Novel
The Crown of the Covenant
| Written by | Ryo Mizuno |
| Illustrated by | Hidari |
| Published by | Kadokawa Shoten |
| Imprint | Kadokawa Sneaker Bunko |
| Published | August 1, 2019 |
Manga
The Crown of the Covenant
| Written by | Ryo Mizuno |
| Illustrated by | Atsushi Suzumi |
| Published by | Kadokawa Shoten |
| English publisher | NA: Udon Entertainment |
| Imprint | Kadokawa Comics Ace |
| Magazine | Monthly Shōnen Ace |
| Original run | October 26, 2019 – April 26, 2021 |
| Volumes | 3 |
Video games
Record of Lodoss War: Haiiro No Majio (1988); Record of Lodoss War: Fukujindzuke (1990); Record of Lodoss War II: Goshiki No Maryu (1992); Record of Lodoss War: Fukujindzuke 2 (1992); Record of Lodoss War (1992); Record of Lodoss War: Fukujindzuke 3 (1993); Record of Lodoss War II (1994); Record of Lodoss War: Eiyuu Sensou (1994); Record of Lodoss War (1995); Record of Lodoss War: Eiyuu Kishiden (1998); Record of Lodoss War: Advent of Cardice (2000); Record of Lodoss War: Successor of the Legend (2012); Record of Lodoss War Online (2016); Record of Lodoss War: Deedlit in Wonder Labyrinth (2021)
- Other
- Sword World RPG; Legend of Crystania; Rune Soldier; Record of Lodoss War: Is That Delicious?

Record of Lodoss War (Japanese: ロードス島戦記, Hepburn: Rōdosu-tō Senki; lit. "Lodoss Island War Chronicle") is a franchise of fantasy novels by Ryo Mizuno based on the work he originally created for a world called Forcelia as a rules-free setting for role-playing games (RPGs). There have since been multiple manga, anime and video game adaptations, several of which have been translated into English. The plots generally follow the conventions and structure of the RPG systems including Dungeons & Dragons and Sword World RPG, in which several characters of distinct types undertake a specific quest.

== Plot ==
Record of Lodoss War recounts the adventures of a youth by the name of Parn, the son of a dishonored knight. Part of his motivation for adventuring is to find out what happened to his father and to restore his family's honor. Despite his inexperience, Parn is considered the leader, who is accompanied by his childhood best friend Etoh, his friend and sometimes advisor Slayn (and later by Slayn's lover Leylia), and his newfound mentor Ghim. They are accompanied by Parn's romantic interest, the high elf Deedlit, who comes from the Forest of No Return seeking an answer to her people's isolationism and an end to what she sees as a slow march to extinction; and a thief named Woodchuck. Throughout the series, Parn comes into contact with friends and foes alike. His allies include King Kashue, King Fahn, Shiris, and Orson; his enemies include Emperor Beld, Ashram, and the evil necromancer Wagnard. Volume two jumps forward by two years and sees Parn and Deedlit participate in a civil war in Flaim on the side of King Kashue.

Volumes three to seven continue the adventures of Parn, but then focus on Spark and his adventures to complete a quest tasked onto him to protect Neese, the daughter of Slayn and Leylia. He is accompanied by his own cast of friends in the form of Leaf, Garrack, Greevus, Aldo, and Ryna, with Wagnard seeking to kidnap Neese in order to use her as a reagent for the resurrection of Naneel, a priestess and the avatar of Kardis who was slain by Leylia's mother, the high priestess Neese a short time after the battle with the demonic god. Leylia was the reincarnation of Naneel, but when she lost her virginity she was no longer capable of being the doorway or reagent needed to unseal Naneel. Spark and his fiancé Neese remain the protagonists of the Record of Lodoss War Next Generation series and become the rulers of Marmo after Ashram's group vacates the island.

The Legend of Crystania setting places the former villain Ashram into the seat of a would-be hero who is placed under a spell by an "animal god" of Crystania. One of the prominent characters is Pirotess, his dark elven lover, as she tries to find a way to free him from the clutches of the spell and restore him to his living self.

== Replays ==
Record of Lodoss War was created in 1986 by Group SNE as a Dungeons & Dragons "replay" serialized in the Japanese magazine Comptiq from September 1986 to September 1989 issues, though they also used the setting with other systems such as Tunnels & Trolls and RuneQuest. Many shorter Lodoss scenarios and replays were published in the Comp RPG magazine (initially a supplement of Comptiq) that ran from 1991 to 1994. Replays are not novels, but transcripts of RPG sessions, meant to both hold the interest of readers and convey the events that took place. They have proven to be popular, even to those who do not play role-playing games but are fans of fiction (including fantasy fiction). Similar to light novels, many characters and parties in replays have become popular as characters of anime. An example of such a character is the female elf Deedlit in Record of Lodoss War, who was played by science fiction novelist Hiroshi Yamamoto during the RPG sessions.

When the replay series went on to become a trilogy, Group SNE had to abandon the Dungeons & Dragons rules and create their own game, dubbed Record of Lodoss War Companion and released in 1989. All three parts of the replay series were eventually published as paperbacks by Kadokawa Shoten from 1989 to 1991, illustrated by Yutaka Izubuchi. They were republished in 1998 under the title Record of Lodoss War RPG Replay Collection: Accursed Island (ロードス島戦記 RPGリプレイ集 呪われた島編, Rōdosu-tō Shimasenki RPG Ripurei-shū Norowareta Shima-hen).

- RPG Replay Record of Lodoss War I (RPGリプレイ ロードス島戦記I, RPG Ripurei Rōdosu-tō Senki I) (November 1989) – Parn's party, retake played according to the Record of Lodoss War Companion rules and incorporating elements from the novelization. Originally serialized from September 1986 to April 1987 issues
- RPG Replay Record of Lodoss War II (RPGリプレイ ロードス島戦記II, RPG Ripurei Rōdosu-tō Senki II) (September 1990) – Orson's party, retake played according to the Record of Lodoss War Companion rules and incorporating elements from the novelization. Originally serialized from June 1987 to July 1988 issues
- RPG Replay Record of Lodoss War III (RPGリプレイ ロードス島戦記III, RPG Ripurei Rōdosu-tō Senki III) (July 1991) – Spark's party, played according to the Record of Lodoss War Companion rules. Originally serialized from September 1988 to September 1989 issues

Two other Record of Lodoss War replay volumes have been published later:

- RPG Replay Record of Lodoss War: Spark, the Heroic Knight (RPGリプレイ ロードス島戦記 英雄騎士スパーク, RPG Ripurei Rōdosu-tō Senki Eiyū Kishi Supāku) (April 1998) – illustrated by Izubuchi. Originally serialized in Comtiq from September to December 1997 issues under the title Record of Lodoss War Special: Marmo Pioneer Edition (ロードス島戦記スペシャル マーモ開拓編, Rōdosu-tō Shimasenki Supesharu Māmo Kaitaku-hen)
- Record of Lodoss War RPG Replay: The Wandering Nobleman's Endless Journey Home (ロードス島戦記RPGリプレイ 放浪貴公子のはてしない家路, Rōdosu-tō Senki RPG Ripurei Hōrō Kikōshi no Hate Shinai Ieji) (October 2020) – illustrated by Retsu Tateo

Three prequel Legend of Lodoss replay volumes based on a draft by Ryo Mizuno, written by Hiroshi Takayama and Group SNE, with illustrations by Retsu Tateo and Tatsumi Minegishi were published. Before being published as light novels, the first two RPG replays were serialized in Comptiq under the title TRPG Magazine Live New Record of Lodoss War: Demon Wars (TRPG誌上ライブ 新ロードス島戦記 魔神戦争, TRPG Shijō Raibu Shin Rōdosu-tō Senki Majin Sensō).

=== Legend of Lodoss ===
- RPG Replay Legend of Lodoss 1: Invasion of the Demons (RPGリプレイ ロードス島伝説1 魔神襲来, RPG Ripurei Rōdosu-tō Densetsu 1 Majin Shūrai) (November 1994) – played according to the Record of Lodoss War Companion rules. Originally serialized from August 1993 to July 1994 issues. A special feature was published in the July 1993 issue
- RPG Replay Legend of Lodoss 2: Summoning of the Demons (RPGリプレイ ロードス島伝説2 魔神召喚, RPG Ripurei Rōdosu-tō Densetsu 2 Majin Shōkan) (October 1995) – played according to the Lodoss Island RPG: Basic Rules. Originally serialized from September 1994 to September 1995 issues. A preview was published in the August 1994 issue
- RPG Replay Legend of Lodoss 3: Subjugation of the Demons (RPGリプレイ ロードス島伝説3 魔神討伐, RPG Ripurei Rōdosu-tō Densetsu 3 Majin Tōbatsu) (October 1996) – played according to the Lodoss Island RPG: Expert Rules

== Novels ==
The popularity of the Record of Lodoss War replays was such that the Dungeon Master Ryo Mizuno started to adapt the story into some of the earliest Japanese-language domestic high fantasy novels.

Mizuno's novelizations were published by Kadokawa Shoten between 1988 and 1993, and followed by two collections of short stories in 1995, High Elf Forest: Deedlit's Tale and The Black Knight, all with illustrations done by Izubuchi. The Black Knight was re-released in 1998, with illustrations by Masato Natsumoto. The first volume of the novelizations, The Grey Witch, was published in English by Seven Seas Entertainment in 2017, with an audiobook released in 2025.

- Record of Lodoss War 1: The Grey Witch (ロードス島戦記 灰色の魔女, Rōdosu-tō Senki Haiiro no Majo) (April 1988 (Kadokawa Bunko) / August 1994 (Kadokawa Sneaker Bunko))
- Record of Lodoss War 2: The Flaming Djinn (ロードス島戦記2 炎の魔神, Rōdosu-tō Senki 2: Honō no Majin) (February 1989)
- Record of Lodoss War 3: The Demon Dragon of Fire Dragon Mountain (Part 1) (ロードス島戦記3 火竜山の魔竜(上), Rōdosu-tō Senki 3: Karyū-zan no Maryū (Jō)) (January 1990)
- Record of Lodoss War 4: The Demon Dragon of Fire Dragon Mountain (Part 2) (ロードス島戦記4 火竜山の魔竜(下), Rōdosu-tō Senki 4: Karyū-zan no Maryū (Ge)) (June 1990)
- Record of Lodoss War 5: The Kings' Holy War (ロードス島戦記5 王たちの聖戦, Rōdosu-tō Senki 5: Ōtachi no Seisen) (February 1991)
- Record of Lodoss War 6: The Holy Knights of Lodoss (Part 1) (ロードス島戦記6 ロードスの聖騎士(上), Rōdosu-tō Senki 6: Rōdosu no Seikishi (Jō)) (November 1991)
- Record of Lodoss War 7: The Holy Knights of Lodoss (Part 2) (ロードス島戦記7 ロードスの聖騎士(下), Rōdosu-tō Senki 7: Rōdosu no Seikishi (Ge)) (March 1993)
- High Elf Forest: Deedlit's Tale (ハイエルフの森 ディードリット物語, Hai Erufu no Mori Dīdoritto Monogatari) (February 1995)
- The Black Knight (黒衣の騎士, Kokui no Kishi) (July 1995 / September 1998)

The first volume forms the basis for the first eight episodes of the Record of Lodoss War original video animation (OVA) series, as well as both Record of Lodoss War: The Grey Witch manga series (by Yoshihiko Ochi and Tomomasa Takuma, respectively). The second was also adapted in manga form by Ayumi Saito, and as a four-CD audio drama. The final five episodes of the OVA series are loosely based on the story told across the third and fourth novels and, having caught up with the ongoing novelization at that point, feature an original ending. The Record of Lodoss War: Chronicles of the Heroic Knight TV series is a more faithful adaptation of volumes three to four and six to seven, with the manga drawn by Masato Natsumoto also adapting from volumes six and seven. The first of two collections of short stories was adapted into the Record of Lodoss War: Deedlit's Tale manga series by Setsuko Yoneyama.

Mizuno later went on to pen other series of novels: an adaptation of Legend of Lodoss (ロードス島伝説, Rōdosu-tō Densetsu) prequel replays (1994 to 2002, five volumes and an extra volume, illustrated by Akihiro Yamada) and sequel novels Crystania: Legend of the Drifters (漂流伝説クリスタニア, Hyōryū Densetsu Kurisutania) (1993 to 1996, four volumes, illustrated by Satoshi Urushihara, part of Legend of Crystania setting) and Record of Lodoss War Next Generation (新ロードス島戦記, Shin Rōdosu-tō Senki) (1998 to 2006, six volumes and a prelude volume, illustrated by Izubuchi (first edition of the prelude and the first novel) and Haruhiko Mikimoto); Legend of Lodoss story was also adapted into the Record of Lodoss War: The Lady of Pharis manga series by Yamada and Legend of Crystania was adapted into a radio drama, a manga by Akira Himekawa, an anime film, and OVA series. In 2019, he released a novel sequel Record of Lodoss War: The Crown of the Covenant (ロードス島戦記 誓約の宝冠, Rōdosu-tō Senki: Seiyaku no Hōkan). The novel takes place 100 years after the events of the original series, with Deedlit as the lead protagonist. It is illustrated by Hidari and was adapted into a manga by Atsushi Suzumi.

=== Legend of Lodoss ===
- Legend of Lodoss 1: Prince of the Fallen Land (ロードス島伝説 亡国の王子, Rōdosu-tō Densetsu: Bōkoku no Ōji) (August 1994)
- Legend of Lodoss 2: Knight of the Sky (ロードス島伝説 2 天空の騎士, Rōdosu-tō Densetsu 2: Tenkū no Kishi) (July 1996)
- Legend of Lodoss: Prince of the Sun, Princess of the Moon (ロードス島伝説 太陽の王子、月の姫, Rōdosu-tō Densetsu: Taiyō no Ōji, Tsuki no Hime) (November 1996) (Two short stories, later included in Eternal Returner)
- Legend of Lodoss 3: The Glorious Champion (ロードス島伝説3 栄光の勇者, Rōdosu-tō Densetsu 3: Eikō no Yūsha) (April 1997)
- Legend of Lodoss 4: The Legendary Hero (ロードス島伝説4 伝説の英雄, Rōdosu-tō Densetsu 4: Densetsu no Eiyū) (March 1998)
- Legend of Lodoss: Eternal Returner (ロードス島伝説 永遠の帰還者, Rōdosu-tō Densetsu: Eien no Kikan-sha) (December 1999) (Four short stories)
- Legend of Lodoss 5: Saint of the Supreme God (ロードス島伝説5 至高神の聖女, Rōdosu-tō Densetsu 5: Shikō-shin no Seijo) (October 2002)

=== Record of Lodoss War Next Generation ===
- Lord of the Dark Island: Record of Lodoss War Next Generation Prelude (暗黒の島の領主 新ロードス島戦記序章, Ankoku no Shima no Ryōshu Shin Lodoss-tou Senki Joshō) (May 1998) (Later included in Inheritors of the Flame)
- Record of Lodoss War Next Generation 1: The Demon Beast of the Forest of Darkness (新ロードス島戦記1 闇の森の魔獣, Shin Lodoss-tou Senki 1 Yami no Mori no Majū) (August 1998 / July 2001)
- Record of Lodoss War Next Generation ～Prelude～: Inheritors of the Flame (新ロードス島戦記～序章～炎を継ぐ者, Shin Lodoss-tou Senki ~ Joshō ~ En o Tsugu Mono) (May 1999 / June 2002)
- Record of Lodoss War Next Generation 2: Rebirth of the Evil Empire (新ロードス島戦記2 新生の魔帝国, Shin Lodoss-tou Senki 2 Shinsei no Ma Teikoku) (March 2001)
- Record of Lodoss War Next Generation 3: The Evil Black Dragon (新ロードス島戦記3 黒翼の邪竜, Shin Lodoss-tou Senki 3 Kuro Tsubasa no Yokoshima Ryū) (November 2001)
- Record of Lodoss War Next Generation 4: Fated Demonic Ship (新ロードス島戦記4 運命の魔船, Shin Lodoss-tou Senki 4 Unmei no Ma-sen) (October 2004)
- Record of Lodoss War Next Generation 5: Unholy Apocalypse I (新ロードス島戦記5 終末の邪教（上）, Shin Lodoss-tou Senki 5 Shūmatsu no Jakyō (Jō)) (October 2005)
- Record of Lodoss War Next Generation 6: Unholy Apocalypse II (新ロードス島戦記6 終末の邪教（下）, Shin Lodoss-tou Senki 6 Shūmatsu no Jakyō (Shita)) (November 2006)

== Other media ==
=== Video games ===
Role-playing games:

- 1988 Record of Lodoss War: Haiiro no Majo (PC 98, PC 88 (1989), MSX (1990), X68000 (1991), FM Towns (1994), Windows 95)
- 1991 Record of Lodoss War II: Goshiki no Maryu (PC 98, X68000 (1992), FM Towns (1994), Windows 95)
- 1992 Record of Lodoss War (PC Engine)
- 1994 Record of Lodoss War II (PC Engine)
- 1994 Record of Lodoss War: Eiyū Sensō (Mega-CD)
- 1995 Record of Lodoss War (SFC), translated by fans in 2014
- 2000 Record of Lodoss War: Advent of Cardice (Dreamcast), released in English
- 2021 Record of Lodoss War: Deedlit in Wonder Labyrinth (Windows and consoles), 2D Metroidvania, released in English

Other video games:

- 1989 Record of Lodoss War: Fukujindzuke (PC 98, MSX (1990), X68000 (1991)), fandisc of Haiiro no Majo
- 1992 Record of Lodoss War: Fukujindzuke 2 (PC 98), fandisc of Goshiki no Maryu
- 1993 Record of Lodoss War: Fukujindzuke 3 (PC 98), fandisc of Goshiki no Maryu and Sword World PC
- 1998 Record of Lodoss War: Eiyū Kishiden (Game Boy Color)

Compilations:

- 2004 PC-9801 Game Revival Collection (Windows), compilation of 15 emulated games, among them Haiiro no Majo, Goshiki no Maryu and Sword World PC
- 2022 Record of Lodoss War Chronicle (Windows), compilation of the nine Lodoss and Sword World games for PC 98 and SFC

Online games:

- 2012 Record of Lodoss War: Successor of the Legend (browser), trading cards game, closed beta released in 2012, shut down in 2014
- 2016 Record of Lodoss War Online (Windows), MMORPG, released in English in 2017, shut down in 2019 in English and in 2024 in South Korea and Japan

=== Music ===
==== Albums ====
- 1989 Arrange Sound from Record of Lodoss War: The Grey Witch (VDR-28071)
- 1990 Record of Lodoss War Original Soundtrack Vol. I (VICL-00051 and SLP-85)
- 1990 Record of Lodoss War Original Soundtrack Vol. II (VICL-00114)
- 1991 Record of Lodoss War Original Soundtrack Vol. III (VICL-00267)
- 1992 Symphonic House from Record of Lodoss War II Arrange Sound (VICL-8060)
- 1993 Record of Lodoss War: Minstrels' Memory of Lodoss (VICL-8090)
- 1995 LODOSS (VICL-624)
- 1996 Record of Lodoss War Original Soundtrack (VICL-2164)
- 1998 Welcome to Lodoss Island! Adventure Drama Music Collection (KICA-400)
- 1998 Record of Lodoss War: Chronicles of the Heroic Knight Original Soundtrack Vol. 1 (VICL-60243)
- 1998 Record of Lodoss War: Chronicles of the Heroic Knight Original Soundtrack Vol. 2 (VICL-60244)
- 1998 Record of Lodoss War: Chronicles of the Heroic Knight Original Soundtrack Vol. 3 (VICL-60246)
- 2021 Record of Lodoss War: Deedlit in Wonder Labyrinth Original Soundtrack (LWDIWL-001)

==== Singles ====
- 1990 Kaze no Fantasia / Adèsso e Fortuna ~Honō to Eien~ (VIDL-19)
- 1991 ODYSSEY (VIDL-42)
- 1992 Kaze to Tori to Sora (VIDL-87)
- 1992 KNIGHT OF LODOSS ~Kaze no Uta~ (VIDL-84)
- 1994 Kaze no Hane / Honō no Ragurima (VIDL-10585)
- 1998 Kiseki no Umi (VIDL-30202)
- 1998 Hikari no Suashi (VIDL-30203)

=== Books on tape ===
From 1989 to 1993 six books on tape (カセットブック, kasetto bukku; lit. 'cassette books') were released. On 31 August 1992, the first five books were released on CD as part of the Record of Lodoss War Special CD Package, which also included a soundtrack Record of Lodoss War Sound Collection. On 22 September 1993, a soundtrack for the books, Record of Lodoss War: Mistrel's Memory of Lodoss, composed by Yoshiyuki Ito and sung by Masumi Itō, was released on CD.

- 1989 The Bewitching Magic Stone (幻惑の魔石, Genwaku no Mashaku), side story of the first novel
- 1989 The Fated Sorcerer (宿命の魔術師, Shukumei no Majutsushi), side story of the third novel
- 1990 Forest of Demon Beasts (魔獣の森, Majū no Mori), side story of the third novel, and an episode featuring the mage and magic beast tamer Elena of Alania. Later adapted to a chapter in Inheritors of the Flame
- 1991 A Traveller From the Elf World (妖精界からの旅人, Yōseikai no Tabibito), later adapted to a chapter in Deedlit's Tale
- 1993 Opening the Forest (開かれた森, Hirakareta Mori), later adapted to a chapter in Deedlit's Tale
- 1993 Fog of Revenge (復讐の霧, Fukushū no Kiri), later adapted to a chapter in Deedlit's Tale

=== Role-playing games ===
- 1989 Record of Lodoss War Companion (ロードス島戦記 コンパニオン, Rōdosu-tō Senki Konpanion)
- 1991 Record of Lodoss War Companion 2 (ロードス島戦記 コンパニオン2, Rōdosu-tō Senki Konpanion 2)
- 1994 Record of Lodoss War Companion 3 (ロードス島戦記 コンパニオン3, Rōdosu-tō Senki Konpanion 3)
- 1995 Lodoss Island RPG: Basic Rules (ロードス島RPG ベーシックルール, Rōdosu-tō RPG Bēshikku Rūru)
- 1996 Lodoss Island RPG: Expert Rules (ロードス島RPG エキスパートルール, Rōdosu-tō RPG Ekisupāto Rūru)
- 1998 Sword World RPG: Lodoss Island World Guide (ソード・ワールドRPG ロードス島ワールドガイド, Sōdo Wārudo RPG Rōdosu-tō Wārudo Gaido) – supplemental material for Sword World RPG
- 2018 Record of Lodoss War RPG (ロードス島戦記RPG, Rōdosu-tō Senki RPG) – 30th anniversary revised edition
- 2019 Record of Lodoss War RPG Supplement: Demon Wars / War of the Destroyer's Resurrection (ロードス島戦記RPGサプリメント『魔神戦争・邪神戦争編』, Rōdosu-tō Senki RPG Sapurimento "Majin Sensō / Jashin Sensō-hen")

=== Anime ===
- 1990 Record of Lodoss War (ロードス島戦記, Rōdosu-tō Senki), 13 episode OVA produced by Madhouse
- 1998 Record of Lodoss War: Chronicles of the Heroic Knight (ロードス島戦記 英雄騎士伝, Rōdosu-tō Senki: Eiyū Kishiden), 27 episode TV series produced by AIC.
- 1998 Welcome to Lodoss Island! (ようこそロードス島へ!, Yōkoso Rōdosu-tō e!), short parodic movie produced by AIC and released as part of a double feature with Maze Bakunetsu Jikū: Tenpen Kyōi no Giant
- 2014 Record of Lodoss War: Is That Delicious? (召しませロードス島戦記 〜それっておいしいの?〜, Meshimase Lodoss-tō Senki: Sorette Oishii no?), 13 episode parodic TV series produced by Studio Deen and Studio Hibari

In North America, the original OVA series and the TV series had both been released through Central Park Media on VHS and on DVD. The OVA and TV series were slated for a Blu-ray release through Media Blasters, but they had dropped all plans to re-release the series. On April 14, 2017, Funimation announced their license to both the OVA series and the Chronicles of the Heroic Knight TV series for the United States. Subsequently, they released the OVA on both Blu-ray and DVD and the TV series on DVD in one set on July 18, 2017.

=== Manga ===
- 1991 The Lady of Pharis (ファリスの聖女, Farisu no Seijo), two volumes, art by Akihiro Yamada, released in English by CPM Manga
- 1993 The Fire Demon (炎の魔神, Honō no Majin), two volumes, art by Ayumi Saito
- 1994 The Grey Witch (灰色の魔女, Haiiro no Majo), three volumes, art by Yoshihiko Ochi, released in English by CPM Manga
- 1995 Welcome to Lodoss Island! (ようこそロードス島へ!, Yōkoso Rōdosu-tō e!), three volumes, four panel parodic manga, art by Hyakuyashiki Rei, first two volumes released in English by CPM Manga
- 1997 Chronicles of the Heroic Knight (英雄騎士伝, Eiyū Kishi-den), six volumes, art by Masato Natsumoto, released in English by CPM Manga
- 1998 Deedlit's Tale (ディードリット物語, Dīdoritto Monogatari), two volumes, art by Setsuko Yoneyama, released in English by CPM Manga
- 2013 The Grey Witch (灰色の魔女, Haiiro no Majo), three volumes, art by Tomomasa Takuma
- 2019 The Crown of the Covenant (誓約の宝冠, Seiyaku no Hōkan), three volumes, art by Atsushi Suzumi, released in English by Udon Entertainment, the first and third volumes of the English edition featured a Barnes & Noble exclusive cover

=== Audio dramas ===
- 1995 The Demons of Wind and Flame (風と炎の魔神, Kaze to Honō no Majin), released in four CD collections. Based on the plot of the second novel which was once supposed to become a second OVA series, but that project was put on hold.
- 1998 Record of Lodoss War: Chronicles of the Heroic Knight Drama Album1 (ロードス島戦記 英雄騎士伝, Rōdosu-tō Senki: Eiyū Kishiden)
- 2013 30th Anniversary Drama CD Type-Moon ✕ Record of Lodoss War (30周年記念 ドラマCD TYPE-MOON✕ロードス島戦記, 30 Shūnenkinen Dorama CD Taipumūn ✕ Rōdosu-tō Senki)

== Related media ==
- Legend of Crystania (はじまりの冒険者たち レジェンド・オブ・クリスタニア, Hajimari no Bōkensha-tachi: Legend of Crystania), a series of RPGs and novels adapted to film, OVAs, manga and a video game, that focus on Crystania, the land to which Ashram and Pirotess migrated after the Lodoss series.
- Rune Soldier, a more comedic series from the same creator set in the same world as Record of Lodoss War, but on the Alecrast continent. The third series of Rune Soldier novels crossed over with Record of Lodoss War and featured Parn and Deedlit.

== Reception ==
The novel series has sold over 10 million copies in Japan.

Australian magazine Hyper reviewed Chronicles of the Heroic Knight in 1999. They rated it 8.5 out of 10.
