= Fujimi Shobo =

Japanese publishing house

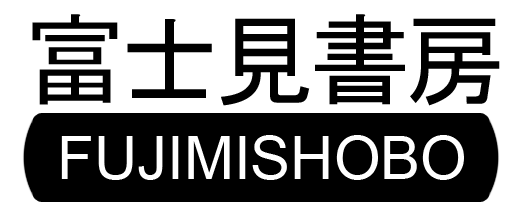
- Native name: 富士見書房
- Formerly: Fujimi Shobo Co., Ltd. (1972–1991, 2005–2013)
- Type: Division
- Founded: 1972; 54 years ago
- Headquarters: Fujimi, Chiyoda, Tokyo, Japan
- Products: Light novels, manga
- Owner: Kadokawa Key-Process

Fujimi Shobo (富士見書房), formerly Fujimi Shobo Co., Ltd. (株式会社富士見書房, Kabushiki gaisha Fujimi Shobō), was a Japanese publisher that specialized in light novels, manga, role-playing games and collectible card games. Founded in 1972 and reorganized three times, it was at times an independent company and at times an imprint of Kadokawa Future Publishing. It ceased to be an independent company in 2013, with its assets folded into Kadokawa Shoten. The brand was retired in 2015.

== Magazines published ==
Light novel magazines

- Fantasia Battle Royal
- Dragon Magazine

Manga magazines

- Monthly Dragon Age
- Dragon Age Pure
- Age Premium

== Publishing labels ==
Active

- Fujimi Dragon Book (role-playing games)
- Fujimi Fantasia Bunko (light novels)
- Fujimi Mystery Bunko (mystery light novels)
- Fujimi L Bunko

Entertainment novel imprint that's aimed at an adult female audience, and contains works in the fantasy, gothic and mystery genres, among others. The stories don't stick to the literature and light novel frameworks. The "L" in the imprint's name is an initial for "Literature" and "Light Novel".

- Fujimi Shobo Novels

A light novel imprint that publishes web novel works from the novel contribution website "Shōsetsuka ni Narō" (小説家になろう) in tankōbon format.

- Kadokawa Books

A light novel imprint that focuses on the publication of web novel works in paper format with the addition of illustrations to them. It also publishes light novel adaptations of games. Entertainment fiction works are published under the imprint, especially web novels from User generated content websites such as "Shōsetsuka ni Narō" (小説家になろう). The label features light novels aimed at both a male and female audience, often (though not always) with either a pink or a blue obi included with the books upon purchase denoting which audience a work is aimed at.

Discontinued

- Oniroku Dan Bunko
- Fujimi Bishōjo Bunko
- Fujimi Bunko
- Fujimi Dragon Novels
- Fujimi Jidaishōsetsu Bunko
- Fujimi Roman Bunko
- Style-F

== Role-playing games ==
- Arianrhod RPG
- Demon Parasite
- GURPS (translated)
- Sword World RPG
- Sword World 2.0

== Collectible card games ==
- Dragon All-Stars
- Monster Collection
- Project Revolution
