= Dragon Magazine (Fujimi Shobo) =

Japanese light novel and manga magazine

- Categories: Male-oriented light novels and manga (shōnen and seinen), and Japanese role-playing games
- Frequency: Monthly (1988–2008); Bi-monthly (2008–2025)
- First issue: 1988
- Final issue: 2025
- Company: Fujimi Shobo
- Country: Japan
- Based in: Tokyo
- Language: Japanese

Dragon Magazine (Japanese: ドラゴンマガジン, Hepburn: Doragon Magajin), abbreviated as Doramaga or DM, was a Japanese light novel and manga magazine which ran for 37 years from 1988 to 2025. In March 2008 it began to be published every other month, and it ceased publication with its May 2025 issue. The final issue included the first new Slayers short story published in 13 years. Following its closure, prominent light novel authors Ryo Mizuno and Shoji Gato expressed their appreciation for the magazine.

The light novel magazine Fantasia Battle Royal was a special edition of Dragon Magazine.

== Serialized works ==
Many popular light novels which were later animated were originally serialized in it. The magazine also features one or two manga series at a time.

| Title | Author | Illustrator | First issue | Last issue |
|---|---|---|---|---|
| Itsuka Tenma no Kuro Usagi Kurenai Gekkou no Seitokaishitsu いつか天魔の黒ウサギ (Itsuka Tenma no Kuro Usagi Kurenai Gekkou no Seitokaishitsu) | Takaya Kagami | Yū Kamiya | February 20, 2010 | Ongoing |
| Chrome Shelled Regios 鋼殻のレギオス (Koukaku no Regiosu) | Shūsuke Amagi | Miyū | March 18, 2006 | September 25, 2013 |
| Date A Live デート・ア・ライブ (Dēto A Raibu) | Kōshi Tachibana | Tsunako | March 19, 2011 | Ongoing |
| Kantai Collection: Bonds of the Wings of Cranes 艦隊これくしょん ‐艦これ‐鶴翼の絆 (Kantai Korekushon: Kakuyoku no kizuna) | Hiroki Uchida | Mataro | January 2014 | Ongoing |
| Is This a Zombie? (Kore wa Zombie Desu ka?) | Shinichi Kimura | Kobuichi Muririn | January 20, 2009 | 2015 |
| The Legend of the Legendary Heroes 伝説の勇者の伝説 (Dai Densetsu no Yuusha no Densetsu) | Takaya Kagami | Saori Toyota | October 25, 2007 | Ongoing |
| Maburaho まぶらほ | Toshihiko Tsukiji | Eeji Komatsu | October 2001 | January 2011 |
| Omamori Himari おまもりひまり | Kougetsu Mikazuki | Milan Matra | July 19, 2008 | 2013 |
| Rune Soldier 魔法戦士リウイ (Mahou Senshi Riui) | Ryo Mizuno | | September 1997 | June 2012 |
| Saekano: How to Raise a Boring Girlfriend 冴えない彼女（ヒロイン）の育てかた (Saenai Hiroin no Sodatekata) | Fumiaki Maruto | Takeshi Moriki | July 20, 2012 | 2017 |
| Tokyo Ravens 東京レイヴンズ (Tōkyō Reivunzu) | Kōhei Azano | Sumihei | May 2010 | Ongoing |

Former serialized works also include:

- Black Blood Brothers
- Chaika - The Coffin Princess
- Chrono Crusade
- Detatoko Princess
- Dragon Half
- Good Luck! Ninomiya-kun
- High School DxD
- Hyper Police
- I Couldn't Become a Hero, So I Reluctantly Decided to Get a Job
- Kaze no Stigma
- Patlabor
- Saber Marionette
- Samurai Girl: Real Bout High School
- Scrapped Princess
- Slayers
- Sorcerous Stabber Orphen
- Student Council's Discretion
- Sword World RPG
- The Ambition of Oda Nobuna
- The Weathering Continent
