= A Dark Rabbit Has Seven Lives =

Japanese light novel series by Takaya Kagami

- Cover of the first light novel

いつか天魔の黒ウサギ (Itsuka Tenma no Kuro Usagi)
- Genre: Fantasy
- Light novel
- Written by: Takaya Kagami
- Illustrated by: Yū Kamiya
- Published by: Fujimi Shobo
- Imprint: Fujimi Fantasia Bunko
- Magazine: Dragon Magazine
- Original run: November 25, 2008 – December 25, 2013
- Volumes: 13
- Light novel

Itsuka Tenma no Kuro Usagi Kurenai Gekkou no Seitokaishitsu
- Written by: Takaya Kagami
- Illustrated by: Yū Kamiya
- Published by: Fujimi Shobo
- Imprint: Fujimi Fantasia Bunko
- Magazine: Dragon Magazine
- Original run: February 20, 2010 – July 25, 2012
- Volumes: 5
- Manga
- Written by: Takaya Kagami
- Illustrated by: Shiori Asahina
- Published by: Fujimi Shobo
- Magazine: Monthly Dragon Age
- Original run: October 9, 2009 – July 9, 2012
- Volumes: 6
- Manga

Itsuka Tenma no Kuro Usagi Kōkō hen Kurenai Gekkou no Seitokaishitsu
- Written by: Takaya Kagami
- Illustrated by: Shushi Imada
- Published by: Kadokawa Shoten
- Magazine: Monthly Shonen Ace
- Original run: February 26, 2011 – November 26, 2012
- Volumes: 2
- Manga

Itsuka Tenma no Dai Usagi
- Written by: Takaya Kagami
- Illustrated by: Takeshi Tani
- Published by: Fujimi Shobo
- Magazine: Monthly Dragon Age
- Original run: February 9, 2011 – September 9, 2011
- Volumes: 1
- Anime television series
- Directed by: Takashi Yamamoto
- Produced by: Tomoko Kawasaki; Seiichi Hachiya; Jun Fukuda; Fumihiko Shinozaki; Seiichi Kawashima; Yoshikazu Kumagai; Akira Yoshikawa; Satoko Kaya
- Written by: Shigeru Morita
- Music by: Shigeo Komori
- Studio: Zexcs
- Original network: TV Saitama, UHF stations
- Original run: July 8, 2011 – September 24, 2011
- Episodes: 12 + OVA
- Manga

Itsuka Tenma o Kiru Majo
- Written by: Takaya Kagami
- Illustrated by: Pochi Edoya
- Published by: Kadokawa Shoten
- Magazine: Comp Ace
- Original run: July 26, 2011 – June 26, 2012
- Volumes: 2
- icon

A Dark Rabbit Has Seven Lives (いつか天魔の黒ウサギ, Itsuka Tenma no Kuro Usagi; lit. The Devil's Black Rabbit of an Unknown Time) is a Japanese light novel series by Takaya Kagami, with illustrations by Japanese-Brazilian illustrator Yū Kamiya. The series includes 13 novels published by Fujimi Shobo between November 2008 and December 2013. The series also has a spin-off series, Kurenai Gekkō no Seitokaishitsu (紅月光の生徒会室, Gekkō Kurenai's Student Council Room), which has five volumes since February 2010. A manga adaptation by Shiori Asahina started serialization in the shōnen manga magazine Monthly Dragon Age on October 9, 2009. A 12-episode anime adaptation aired between July and September 2011.

== Plot ==
Kurogane Taito is a freshman in Miyasaka High. Ever since an injury to his leg (a snapped tendon) that prevented him from practicing karate, which he had excelled in since elementary school, he has always believed that he was an ordinary, regular guy. However, due to a promise exchanged with a beautiful Vampire (Most Ancient Sorcerer) Saitohimea nine years ago which he has forgotten about, he is in fact no longer ordinary. Nine years ago, Saitohimea injected him with a poison, which prevents him from dying as long as he doesn't die seven times within fifteen minutes. Shortly after his change, a boy named Kurenai Hinata attacked them with a demon and killed Taito six times in rapid succession. In order to prevent him from killing Taito outright, Saitohimea agreed to leave with Hinata and allow Taito's memory to be wiped. Subsequent to this, Saitohimea was experimented on and imprisoned in a dimension with no sound or light whatsoever, and Taito continued with his life as a normal human.

Taito has recently been having a recurring dream concerning Saitohimea, although he is unable to remember her name. After saving Andou Mirai from being hit by a truck he is himself killed, however due to his conditional immortality, he survives. After his body picks up and reattaches his head, he begins to remember more details about Saitohimea and eventually recalls her name, which allows Saitohimea to regain her powers and escape from her prison. By this point, Taito has realized that not only are his most recent injuries healed, but his previous leg injury is also healed. He is attacked by the Church but is able to survive and he makes his way to the playground where he and Saitohimea met previously, where they are reunited.

Along with unlikely allies, Kurenai Gekkou, Miyasaka High's student council president and genius who is bent on avenging his parents as well as Andou Mirai, Gekkou's cute lightning demon familiar, Taito and Saitohimea have to contend against Gekkou's younger twin brother, Kurenai Hinata, who seeks to revive the powerful Vampire (Most Ancient Sorcerer) Bahlskra. Unknown to them, their destinies were already woven and foretold in an ancient prophecy of epic proportions.

== Characters ==
Taito Kurogane (鉄 大兎, Kurogane Taito)
Voiced by: Yūki Kaji (drama CD), Shinnosuke Tachibana (anime)
A light-blue hair 16-year-old freshman of Miyasaka High, the protagonist of the story, Kurogane Taito used to excel in karate when he was young, but later had to give it up due to a leg injury. Since then, he had believed himself to be an ordinary, regular guy. However, his memories of an event nine years ago were sealed up, during which he had made a contract with the beautiful Saitohimea and acquired an extraordinary ability which grants him a conditional form of immortality. At the start of the story, he manages to regain those memories after a certain incident and goes on to reunite with Saitohimea. He later acquires further powers and swears to protect Saitohimea from the Tenma (天魔). One of the powers he acquires is a familiar in the form of a cat, this familiar, called Nyankichi, required a certain amount of blood to be summoned which was impossible for a normal human to give without dying. The familiar enabled him to cast spells which allowed him to see in the dark as well as a magic which curses other magic, therefore sealing them. While Tenma is normally translated as evil spirit or demon, in the story, it is a special existence different from the conventional evil spirit. He gradually remembers the feelings he had for Saitohimea and realizes he is falling in love with her as she is with him.
Saitohimea (サイトヒメア, Saitohimea) / Himea Saito (沙糸 ヒメア, Saito Himea)
Voiced by: Marina Inoue (drama CD), Megumi Takamoto (anime)
Excluding the sealed up Bahlskra, Saitohimea is the last of the Vampires. In the story, 'Vampire' is used as the furigana reading of 'Most Ancient Sorcerer' (最古の魔術師). Saitohimea is described to have mischievous crimson eyes, pink lips, and lavender colored hair which ends in a spectrum of colors. Since she was born, everyone around her has sought and hunted her for her powers, except for Taito, whom she fell in love with and subsequently formed a contract with. In order to revive the dead Taito, she exchanged most of her powers in order to revive him, but still retains a large amount compared to humans. She later joins Miyasaka High as a student, and together with Taito, becomes part of Gekkou's student council and takes on the name of Himea Saito.
Gekkou Kurenai (紅 月光, Kurenai Gekkō)
Voiced by: Daisuke Ono (drama CD), Yūichi Nakamura (anime)
Kurenai Gekkou, a freshman and also the student council president of Miyasaka High, is a self-proclaimed genius. Nine years ago before the starting tumeframe of the story, due to a certain deed committed by his younger twin brother, Hinata, Gekkou was prompted to constantly seek out power, initially driven by the fear for his life, and later motivated by the prospects of revenge. Gekkou is demonstrated to be quick-witted and highly intelligent. He wields an ancient fencing-like sword known as Spell Error, and is trained in several traditional arts of exorcism. As the student council president, he has made a contract with the lightning demon Mirai and is tasked to be the guardian of the Holy Ground (聖地)( a location with certain special properties over which Miyasaka High was built). He claims Mirai as his property and is very possessive over her. His superiority complex is often shown by his self proclamation of Genius, and belief that he is stronger than his brother.
Mirai Andou (安藤 美雷, Andō Mirai)
Voiced by: Chiwa Saito (drama CD), Iori Nomizu (anime)
Also a student of Miyasaka High despite her age, Mirai is a lightning demon that takes on the form of a cute, 14-year-old bishōjo. Initially tasked to kill Gekkou, she later went on to form a contract with him as she became unable to release her powers without his consent. While she is considered to be an upper-class demon of noble blood, most of her powers are usually sealed away by Gekkou and can only be re-activated with his permission, upon which her hair will turn golden and her body will be wrapped in a vortex of lightning. She is described to be excessively boisterous and annoying to Gekkou, though on the flip side, she is often irritated by Gekkou's apparent indifference to her existence. Her favorite pastime is reading manga and drawing, whilst her favourite drink is Dr. Cinnamon.
Haruka Shigure (時雨 遥, Shigure Haruka)
Voiced by: Saori Hayami (drama CD), Mina (anime)
A girl with medium length hair, Haruka is the classmate and childhood friend of Taito. She carries romantic feelings for Taito. Her role is revealed to be of an observer later in the story, though she only knows this when her other personality is in control. Her other personality lacks emotion compared to her counterpart and is aware of the events around her.
Hinata Kurenai (紅 日向, Kurenai Hinata)
Voiced by: Jun Fukuyama (drama CD, anime)
Younger identical twin brother of Gekkou. Described to be cold and emotionless, he sees all other humans, including his own brother, as inferior to himself. He wields several powers, including the ability to summon different contracted demons and dimensional beings to do his bidding. Hinata wants to capture Saitohimea for a particular reason.
Bahlskra (バールスクラ, Bārusukura)
Voiced by: Takehito Koyasu
A powerful sealed up Vampire (Most Ancient Sorcerer) at the start of the story. He has deep ties to Saitohimea. It is later revealed that Bahlskra is an alternate personality. Saitohimea created him to fend off her loneliness, and by defeating Bahlskra was the first part of a certain magic called Bliss completed.
Izumi Aomi (碧水 泉, Aomi Izumi)
Voiced by: Chika Horikawa
A delinquent of Miyasaka High. Due to the fact that her memory of a demon attack in school was not erased, she decided to become the secretary of Gekkou's student council, much to his discontent. She has a friendly rivalry with Gekkou.
Serge Entolio (セルジュ・エントリオ, Seruju Entorio)
Voiced by: Nobuhiko Okamoto
A powerful half-elf spell breaker from the world of elves. His power is oriented towards seals and barrier construction. Serge has golden hair and deep blue eyes and possesses a friendly disposition. The desire to save their mother from the wounds and damages incurred from the Church's experiments prompted him and Hasga to join Gekkou's student council in the human world, after they have helped rescue their mother, Ela of the East. He was influenced by Taito, causing him to seal his mother rather than destroy her, against his original intentions and her pleas.
Hasga Entolio (ハスガ・エントリオ, Hasuga Entorio)
Voiced by: Kenichi Suzumura
A powerful half-elf spell breaker from the world of elves. His power is oriented towards destruction which also includes seals and barriers and magic. The younger brother of Serge, Hasga has deep blue hair and golden eyes and possesses a temperament disposition. The desire to save their mother from the wounds and damages incurred from the Church's experiments prompted him and Serge to join Gekkou's student council in the human world, after they have helped rescue their mother, Ela of the East.
Rii Ne (璃依音, Rīne)
A young German girl of the Temperon Crowely group. She has silver hair tied up into twin tails, and is skilled in the Japanese sword and flame magic. She appears to have some ties to Gekkou.
Yūichi Philier Cross (黒守・フィリエル・優一, Kurosu Firieru Yūichi)
Voiced by: Junichi Suwabe
7th student council president of Miyasaka High who is currently an agent of the Military. Usually dressed in a suit with a red tie and wears gloves. He is a formidable opponent who is sent to supervise, build up the current student council, and keep them in check. It was due to him that Izumi was allowed to remain in the Student Council without erasing her memory. His ability is strong enough to counter the weakened Saitohimea. He appears to have some ulterior motive.
Nyankichi (ニャン吉, Nyankichi)
Familiar of Taito from another dimension. His former name is Vishoub Eleranka (ヴィショウブ・エレランカ, Vishoubu Ereranka). Taito got to him through a fragment of the fountain of knowledge acquired from Edeluka. In exchange for Taito's blood daily, he grants Taito two powers: Night vision and spell displacement.
Ela of the East (東のエラ, Higashi no Era)
Powerful female elf who is the mother of Serge and Hasga. She was betrayed by her kin to the Church and experimented on.
Skrald (スクラルド, Sukurarudo)
From the demon plane (Makuae), Skrald is the descendant of Indra and the mother of Mirai. She belongs to the most powerful class of demons in Makuae.
Liir (リィル, Riiru)
Liiru is the personified spirit of the Holy Ground of Miyasaka High, which unlike other Holy Grounds, is a unique Holy Ground where all dimensions and worlds intersect. She appears as a 12-year-old fair-skinned girl with black hair and wearing a dark kimono. Liir cannot see people who are above eighteen years old. Her current contractor is the 12th student council president, Kurenai Gekkou.

== Media ==
=== Light novels ===
The light novels were written by Takaya Kagami, with illustrations by Brazilian illustrator Yū Kamiya. Fujimi Shobo published 13 volumes under their Fujimi Fantasia Bunko imprint between November 25, 2008, and December 25, 2013. The ninth volume, released in December 2011, came bundled with an original video animation episode written by Takaya Kagami. The episode consist of three short stories, two based on ideas tweeted in by fans, and one as a crossover with another of Kagami's work, The Legend of the Legendary Heroes.

=== Manga ===
The manga adaptation, illustrated by Shiori Asahina, was published in Monthly Dragon Age from October 9, 2009, to July 9, 2012, and collected into six volumes.

=== Anime ===
No.	Title	Directed by	Written by	Original air date
1	"900 Seconds of After School [Part One]"; Transliteration: "900-Byō no Hōkago (Zenpen)" (Japanese: 900秒の放課後<前編>)	Yasunari Nitta	Shigeru Morita	July 9, 2011
Kurogane Taito continues to have a recurring dream. A 6-year-old Taito sees a girl who he cannot remember while they sit together in the playground. She tells him that she will give him her poison and afterwards they will always be together, enticing him when he becomes frightened with comforting words. After biting him and giving him her poison, the girl confesses her love to him and encourages him to tell her he loves her as well, thus sealing the curse. Taito is then woken up as a high schooler by Shigure Haruka, whom we realize is a long time friend and a girl who has a crush on Taito. After a school day that includes bumping into the most popular boy in school, the cold hearted Kurenai Gekkou, Taito and Haruka split ways as Taito heads home. As he's crossing the street, he notices a sleeping truck driver headed straight for Andou Mirai, Gekkou's apparent subordinate, and jumps forward to push her out of the way only to be hit himself, an obvious killing blow... until Taito's head begins speaking to Mirai and his body stands by itself, grabbing the head and running off in a panic. As Taito frantically worries he suddenly remembers who the girl from his dream is, Saito Himea, the girl who enslaved him when he was younger and was taken away by a man who left Taito with no memories of Himea. When Taito speaks her name, she is released from her prison, turns into a fifteen-year-old and meets Taito at the playground from their youth. Gekkou arrives and stabs Himea through the chest, ending their long awaited reunion.
2	"900 Seconds of After School [Part Two]"; Transliteration: "900-Byō no Hōkago (Kōhen)" (Japanese: 900秒の放課後<後篇>)	Itsuro Kawasaki	Masaharu Amiya	July 16, 2011
Gekkou and Mirai start fighting Taito and Himea, but are interrupted by Gekkou's brother Hinata. Taito uses up all six of his lives and seemingly dies while Himea screams his name and he wakes back up in class. "The new transfer student" Himea walks into class and jumps onto him, knocking both of them to the floor while everyone else is blushing. Haruka, who has been his friend and classmate since childhood is shocked. They meet Gekkou and Mirai, and Gekkou tells them they are going to be his "slaves" and work with them in the student council. Himea tells Taito they will be together forever while she clings to his arm.
3	"The (Moon) Sways by the Poolside"; Transliteration: ""Tsuki" ga Yureru Pūrusaido" (Japanese: 《月》が揺れるプールサイド)	Kazuma Satō	Shigeru Morita	July 23, 2011
Taito is torn between having lunch with Saitohimea or eating the meal that Haruka prepared. Luckily, he is saved by a call from Gekkou as insects have invaded the school and school has been cancelled for the day. It turns out that the school is situated in a place where portals from multiple dimension intersect and that the military are in charge of the area but no one over 18 can get into the area because of a barrier. Mirai is disappointed that swim classes were cancelled due to the bugs, and forces the others to join her at the pool but Gekkou walks off to the Student Council room. Mirai reveals to Taito how she was forced to contract with Gekkou. At the Student Council Room, Gekkou meets a messenger from the Tenma. The sky turns black, and the moon starts to glow while it starts to rain red liquid.
4	"The Seraphim Yet Unsung"; Transliteration: "Imada Tenma wa Utawarenai" (Japanese: いまだ天魔は歌われない)	Seo Hye-jin	Keiichirō Ōchi	July 30, 2011
A portal appears that supposedly leads to Tenma, and Gekkou and Mirai jump in. Saitohimea gets possessed by the red liquid, which is revealed to be Bahlskra. Bahlskra tries to permanently kill Taito because he is concerned for Saitohimea, but Saitohimea believes that Taito is the only one who can save her as he is not stained like they are. She then destroys Bahlskra. At the end, the Tenma is conversing with their observer on Earth who was created for the sole purpose so that Saitohimea does not complete the sacred spell, Bliss. The observer is revealed to be none other than Haruka, but she herself does not realize her dual life.
5	"And the Seraphim is Sung"; Transliteration: "Soshite Tenma ga, Utawareru" (Japanese: そして天魔が、歌われる)	Yasunari Nitta	Kiyoko Yoshimura	August 6, 2011
Since Balhskra is gone, instead Bliss has taken over Saitohimea's body. Bliss is a spell that Saitohimea created when she was lonely a long, long time ago. Meanwhile, Gekkou meets with Tenma who states that the "witch was broken due to solitude" and reveals to him a prophecy where "Ramiel Lilith would destroy the world". Tenma gives him the power to stop Ramiel in exchange that they would not interfere with his "underlings". It seems that Saitohimea was hurting because she was unsure of Taito's feelings. Himea and Taito finally kiss and Taito finally reveals his feelings for Himea. Gekkou confronts Himea to see if she knows anything about Ramiel, but it seems like she doesn't. During this episode, Haruka is out shopping so she can make meals for Taito and at the end sees Hinata alive and well, waiting for her in front of her home.
6	"(Extracurricular) Activities While Passing Each Other By"; Transliteration: "Surechigai no "Kagai" Jugyō" (Japanese: すれ違いの《課外》授業)	Sasa Fujisawa	Keiichirō Ōchi	August 13, 2011
Hinata appears to Haruka. Haruka is actually an observer sent by the monsters on the other side of the moon. He was thinking of using her against her masters, but it seems that she may be planning on rebelling them. Saitohimea suddenly drags Taito away to bring him on a date. An unknown male and female were watching their conversation nearby. Taito wants to become stronger and tries to unsuccessfully ask Gekkou for help. A guy dressed in a black suits enters the school and seems to be talking to a blue haired girl who suddenly just disappears. The guy is revealed to be Cross Philier Yuuichi, the new English teacher and Student Council advisor. Meanwhile, Saitohimea has almost dragged Taito out of the school before he apologizes that he can't go on a date and excuses himself saying that he had some plans for the day. Actually he was planning on training at the fight clubs and it seems that he has actually gotten stronger to the point that world fighters can't compete with him. Meanwhile Gekkou and Mirai are told about magical traps in the city and they go to several places, which seems to Mirai as if they're on a proper date. They meet Taito who is on his way back and Mirai tells his Saitohimea was crying. Taito realizes his mistakes and runs back to be with Saitohimea.
7	"The Pop-Quizzing New Teacher"; Transliteration: "Nukiuchi Tesuto no Shin'nin Kyōshi" (Japanese: 抜き打ちテストの新任教師)	Atsushi Nakayama	Masaharu Amiya	August 20, 2011
Taito wants to become stronger so he can protect Saitohimea. Gekkou sends him off to meet Eduluca who will grant any wish but takes "payment" of equal value. Before he makes his wish, Taito learns that Saitohimea came to Eduluca when he had died previously and exchanged a large amount of her power to revive him. Taito wishes to become strong but only through his own power. Eduluca is disappointed but grants his wish by planting within him a lot of useful and useless information but still takes something important to Taito though doesn't reveal what it is. Saitohimea offers to help Taito search for something helpful within the amount of information he was given, wherein Taito meets and forms a contract with Vishoub Eleranka. Meanwhile Cross appears in the Student Council room to reveal that the military has commissioned him to keep an eye on things. Gekkou calls the military incompetent and Cross reveals his superior speed to aggravate him into a scuffle and show him that he isn't as powerful as he thought himself to be.
8	"The Student Council of Remedial Students"; Transliteration: "Zen'in Hoshū no Seito-kai-shitsu" (Japanese: 全員補習の生徒会室)	Yūta Maruyama	Shigeru Morita	August 27, 2011
The group has arrived at a beach, which is meant to be an intensive training camp and even Izumi was invited to come. Cross tests out their limits and announces that each of them should become powerful enough even to beat ancient dragons. He also states that they would each be tested at the end and will not be able to leave the area's barrier if they fail. Cross thought he had everything planned out thinking that Izumi could be their cook... but after several days of eating curry for breakfast, lunch and dinner, decides to call for some help. During their break, Taito and the others are surprised by the appearance of Haruka.
9	"Dark Rabbit on the Beach"; Transliteration: "Namiuchigiwa no Kuro Usagi" (Japanese: 波打ちぎわの黒ウサギ)	Seo Hye-jin	Kiyoko Yoshimura	September 3, 2011
It seems that Haruka was asked by Cross to cook for the whole group. This leads to a lot of tension due to the love triangle between Taito, Saitohimea and Haruka. Izumi tries to cheer up Saitohimea and suggests the group have a test of courage event. Izumi thought she made sure that Saitohimea would get paired with Taito, but Cross interfered so he could pair with Taito. He pats Taito on the way back... and a dark demonic figure seems to awaken within Taito. The group finishes the night with fireworks, where Haruka confesses her feelings to Taito.
10	"Classmate Spirited Away"; Transliteration: "Kamigakushi no Dōkyūsei" (Japanese: 神隠しの同級生)	Sasa Fujisawa	Keiichirō Ōchi	September 10, 2011
While traveling, Saeko's vehicle is attacked and Haruka has been kidnapped by two male magic wielders called spellbreakers. Cross refuses to let Taito and the rest rescue her, saying that it's now a military matter. One of the spellbreakers appears to Saitohimea while she is alone and offers to release Haruka if she would surrender herself to them. Izumi tries to talk her out of it and then goes to Taito when she fails. She turns herself in to the spellbreakers, but they trap her instead and refuse Haruka. Taito and Gekkou then assault the school to open a gate to where the spellbreakers are. Meanwhile, while they assault the school it is revealed that the observer personality of Haruka's was the one who commissioned the spellbreakers. She promised to give them her knowledge about the Tenma if they would destroy the observer personality, seal up Saitohimea and then return her other self back to Taito.
11	"Summer Vacation Catastrophe"; Transliteration: "Natsuyasumi Katasutorofi" (Japanese: 夏休みカタストロフィ)	Yasunari Nitta	Shigeru Morita	September 17, 2011
Gekkou and Mirai fight with Cross while Taito makes his way to save Haruka and Saitohimea. The fight ends up with Cross threatening to kill Mirai and Gekkou bowing his head to Cross and asking him to spare her. Hinata appears and mocks his brother and Cross, and states that he knows all about the prophecy and that they are not even near his power level. Taito fights Hasga while Serge continues to seal up Saitohimea, even though they offer to let Taito return home with Haruka. Nyankichi shows up for a second, tells Taito to curse magic and disappears... even though his spell seemed to have no effect. Taito gets beaten to the point that he will permanently die, but continues to struggle and the two spellbreakers are reminded of when they were young kids in a similar situation. Gekkou arrives to help, but Taito refuses his help even though he uses his last drop of stamina to barely lightly punch Hasga. Saitohimea then wakes up, as Taito's spell seemed to have allowed her to analyze and counter Serge's sealing spell. She almost kills the two spellbreakers, but Taito asks that they just go home. Haruka seems to be fine, but without her other personality. The spellbreakers end up joining the school.
12	"Pale White Graduation"; Transliteration: "Honoka ni Shiroi Shūgyō-shiki" (Japanese: ほのかに白い終業式)	Atsushi Nakayama	Masaharu Amiya	September 24, 2011
The summer holidays brings with it the summer heat! And so, Haruka decides to invite Taito to the public baths. Coincidentally, Izumi convinces Saitohimea to go as well and they meet Gekkou, Mirai and even Hasga and Serge there too. Hilarities then ensue. Meanwhile, Cross in a monologue reveals that the mysterious girl he was talking to in an earlier episode is called Liir and is currently with the student president and that the dark rabbit within Taito might awaken soon. Also seen in a monologue is Hinata, who talks to himself saying that his brother might actually be able to do something about the prophecy. After the baths, Taito and the rest of the group jump into a portal and leaves the series in a cliffhanger.
OVA	"A Dark Rabbit Has Seven Lives"; Transliteration: "Itsuka Tenma no Kuro Usagi" (Japanese: いつか天魔の黒ウサギ)	Shunsuke Fukui	Shigeru Morita	N/A
After taking a nap, Mirai is thirsty and Gekkō refuses to buy her a drink. She notices a strange-looking potion on the table and chugs it despite Yūichi previously telling her not to touch it. The potion causes the person who consumed it to swap souls (thus switching bodies) with anyone he or she comes in contact with. The main cast spend the day inadvertently swapping bodies due to Mirai's carelessness.
