= Magatsu Wahrheit =

2019 smartphone game

- Game header

禍つヴァールハイト (Magatsu Vāruhaito)
- Video game
- Developer: KLab
- Publisher: KLab
- Produced by: Sakajiri Kazuto
- Music by: Masaru Yokoyama
- Genre: Massively multiplayer online role-playing game
- Engine: Unity
- Platform: Android, iOS
- Released: JP: April 23, 2019; WW: October 2020
- Anime television series

Magatsu Wahrheit -Zuerst-
- Directed by: Naoto Hosoda
- Written by: Naoto Hosoda; Yūichirō Momose
- Music by: Masaru Yokoyama
- Studio: Yokohama Animation Laboratory
- Licensed by: Crunchyroll: SEA: Muse Communication
- Original network: Tokyo MX, BS11, Wowow, MBS
- Original run: October 13, 2020 – December 29, 2020
- Episodes: 12

Magatsu Wahrheit (Japanese: 禍つヴァールハイト, Hepburn: Magatsu Vāruhaito; transl. "Evil Truth") is a massively multiplayer online role-playing game for smartphones that is developed and published by KLab. The game is powered by Unity, and was made available for Android and iOS in April 2019 in Japan. An anime television series adaptation produced by Yokohama Animation Laboratory aired from October to December 2020.

== Synopsis ==
The game is set in a world that has been destroyed by ten "lights" (Japanese: 光) and follows the mobile corps, a research organization by those who gained power from the "lights".

== Characters ==
Innumael (イヌマエル, Innumaeru)
Voiced by: Atsushi Abe (Japanese); Aleks Le (English)
Innumael Grauer is a young man involved in the transportation industry. He is a smuggler, whom his colleagues have nicknamed "The Dog". One day, Leocadio helps him load the truck faster, but accidentally loads two packages not meant for delivery. Innumael finishes loading the packages and drives the truck to its destination. He gets stopped at a customs check point where a guard checks the packages, which are revealed to house weapons. Innumael is imprisoned for smuggling, but is broken out by the smuggling organization Headkeeper. Innumael and his rescuers escape and are branded criminals.
Unable to go back to his old life, Innumael is forced to stay with Headkeeper and helps them throughout their journey across the Empire. Although he is initially timid and reluctant to get into fights, he nevertheless proves himself capable in surviving the multiple problems that Headkeeper encounters.
Leocadio (レオカディオ, Reokadio)
Voiced by: Yūki Ono (Japanese); Stephen Sanders (English)
A serious young man who belongs to the Zeroth Platoon of the Wahrheit Imperial Army. Leocadio lives with his siblings and Seitz, a childhood friend. On his first day as an imperial soldier, Leocadio sees a delivery man being scolded for slacking off and decides to help him load his truck but ends uploading goods that shouldn't have been loaded. Later, Leocadio and his squad are assigned to transport a criminal who smuggled goods, who ends up being Innumael Grauer. But as Innumael was freed from prison by the Headkeeper smuggling organization, Leocadio's commander Helman manages to locate them and engage them in a fight.
During the fight, Seitz is killed by Immanuel, who was just trying to protect Schaake, the woman who saved him. Although he is distracted by Seitz's death, he does not believe Immanuel to be a criminal and tries to discover Immanuel's connection to Headkeeper. Unfortunately, Helman, Leocadio's commanding officer, becomes obsessed with destroying Headkeeper and uses Sissel, Innumael's sister, as a hostage in exchange for Innumael's execution. Leocadio saves Sissel but is forced to kill Helman, branding himself as a criminal in the process, and has no choice but to join Headkeeper as a way to investigate the Empire's corruption.
Schaake Gutheil (シャアケ・グートハイル, Shaake Gūtohairu)
Voiced by: Yumiri Hanamori (Japanese); Felecia Angelle (English)
Schaake Gutheil is a member of the noble Gutheil family and also an operative for Headkeeper. She is a mage on the team led by Arnold. Schaake and other Headkeeper members go to take a package that was for them, but learn that the package was incorrectly loaded into a truck and transported out of the base. As Schaake tries to track it down, the group learns that a delivery driver was arrested for smuggling weapons, and realize it is their package.
The driver, Innumael, is arrested by Imperial authorities but Schaake and her team break him out of prison. They are ambushed by an Imperial squad and Schaake is almost killed by Seitz, until Innumael kills Seitz to save her. Since he has nowhere to go, Schaake allows Innumael to stay with Headkeeper. During the journey, she also reveals herself to be a noblewoman.
Elfriede (エルフリーデ, Erufurīde)
Voiced by: Yukiyo Fujii (Japanese); Erica Mendez (English)
Elfriede is a member of the smuggling organization Headkeeper. Her role is to infiltrate the Imperial Capital and carry out solo intelligence missions. She infiltrates the Imperial Capital and learns that money from Headkeeper is flowing into Diet. She realizes there is a traitor among them and informs Fritz, who later tells her to investigate a mental institution that was closed years ago. Believing that this may also lead her to finding the traitor, she infiltrates it and learns that Mary Bult is involved in secret human experiments but is caught before she is able to escape. Arnold and Benjamin lead a rescue mission and manage to find her in a capsule in the mental institution.
Unfortunately, Professor Radovaud, the scientist in charge of the institution, has irrevocably turned Elfriede into a monster and she goes on a rampage, threatening friend and foe alike. Headkeeper is forced to kill her, but Elfriede uses her last moments to reveal her information to her comrades.
Helman (ヘルマン, Heruman)
Voiced by: Kenjiro Tsuda (Japanese); Ian Sinclair (English)
Helman is the captain of the Zeroth Platoon of the Wahrheit Empire. He was the bastard son of a noble and a maid. He and his mother endured a terrible life at the hands of his father. After his mother committed suicide, Helman became a serial killer and blamed his murders on his father, causing him to be arrested.
He assigns Leocadio Wöhler to Seitz. They are assigned to take a criminal back to the capital, and go to take him, but learn there was a prison break and Headkeeper smugglers took the man, Innumael Grauer. Helman deduces that Headkeeper is attempting to mislead them and leads the platoon in the opposite direction, where they find Headkeeper members. Unable to run, Headkeeper engages in a fight and Helman injures Damian, but Seitz dies. He takes Damian as prisoner but does not report that he is still alive, and tortures him to learn about Headkeeper's hideout in the next city. He locks down the city, but Headkeeper manages to escape.
His obsession with destroying Headkeeper causes him to kidnap Innumael's sister and use her as a hostage in exchange for Innumael's execution, forcing Leocadio to kill him so he can save Sissel.
Arnold (アルノルト, Arunoruto)
Voiced by: Kenichirou Matsuda (Japanese); Ray Hurd (English)
Arnold is a member of Headkeeper. Arnold and other Headkeeper members go to retrieve a package that was meant for them, but learn it was wrongly loaded into a truck and transported out of the base. While tracking it down, they learn that Innumael is arrested for smuggling weapons and realize it is their package. They make a plan and Arnold leads them to break into prison and save the driver and take their package. While running, Helman leads imperial soldiers, manages to find them and engages them in combat. Losing the fight, they create explosions to distract the imperial soldiers and manage to escape.
Benjamin (ベンジャミン)
Voiced by: Junichi Yanagita (Japanese); Mark Allen Jr. (English)
Benjamin is a member of Arnold's team. He and other Headkeeper members go to retrieve a package that was meant for them, but learn that the package was wrongly loaded into a truck and transported out of the base.
Klaus (クラウス, Kurausu)
Voiced by: Ryōta Suzuki (Japanese); Cody Savoie (English)
A member of Arnold's team.
Conrad (コンラッド, Konraddo)
Voiced by: Kazuyuki Okitsu (Japanese); Billy Kametz (English)
Conrad Wisdom is a senior soldier of the Warheit Imperial Army in the Magatsu Wahrheit: Zuerst anime series. He is Leocadio's senior and Seitz's younger brother. He is ordered by Helman to take a prisoner back to the capital, who is freed by Headkeeper, and his platoon ends up chasing them and engage in a fight, where Seitz dies. The soldiers follow Headkeeper to the next town, but the organization manages to escape. He and Leocadio are later assigned to find and retrieve Sissel, Innumael Grauer's little sister.
Fritz (フリッツ, Furittsu)
Voiced by: Tarusuke Shingaki (Japanese); Christopher Bevins (English)
A member of Headkeeper and leader of the organization's branch in the Imperial capital.
Seitz (ザイツ, Zaitsu)
Voiced by: Takuya Satō (Japanese); Jason Liebrecht (English)
A close friend and squadmate of Leocadio. During Leocadio's first mission, he is unexpectedly killed by Innumael in an attempt to protect Schaake.
Damian (ダミアン)
Voiced by: Taishi Murata (Japanese); Austin Tindle (English)
A member of the Headkeeper team.
Shisel (シセル, Shiseru)
Voiced by: Aya Yamane (Japanese); Bryn Apprill (English)
Innumael's younger sister. After the death of their parents, Innumael raised her all by himself, even using what little money he earned to put her through school. She lived a quiet life in a secluded village until she is found by Leocadio and Conrad, who inform her that Innumael was involved in fight that resulted in the death of Seitz, an Imperial soldier. Although she does not believe her brother to be a murderer, she nevertheless agrees to come to the Imperial capital as a person of interest.
She is later taken hostage by Helman, who wants to kill Innumael as punishment for killing an Imperial soldier, and Leocadio is forced to kill Helman as a way to save her.
Marie (マリー, Marī)
Voiced by: Masako Katsuki
An influential member of the Diet, the Empire's religious organization.
Professor Radovaud (ラドバウド博士, Radobaudo Hakase)
Voiced by: Katsuyuki Konishi (Japanese); J. Michael Tatum (English)
An Imperial scientist in charge of a mental institution that secretly performs illegal experiments on humans. He captures Elfriede and turns her into a monster.
Jade (ジェイド, Jeido)
Voiced by: Minoru Shiraishi (Japanese); Kiba Walker (English)
Leader of Headkeeper's branch in the Imperial capital and double agent working for the Empire.
Lotus (ロータス, Rōtasu)
Voiced by: Shinya Takahashi (Japanese); Kaiji Tang (English)
Patriarch of the Guthiel family and Schaake's father.
Irma (イルマ, Iruma)
Voiced by: Maria Naganawa (Japanese); Sarah Wiedenheft (English)
Irma is a Headkeeper member of the Teito branch. In a hideout at the capital, Irma recognizes Innumael Grauer from wanted posters. After Fritz instructs them on the rescue operation, Irma and Innumael are placed on lookout. Innumael sees Leocadio and heads out. After he returns, he tells her that the imperial army knows of their actions and that it is a trap. They form an escape plan. Innumael leads the Imperial soldiers away, who end up following him. After losing them in the warehouse he works at, Irma arrives to pick him up with the car and they escape.
Faust (ファウスト, Fausuto)
Voiced by: Tomokazu Sugita (Japanese); Griffin Puatu (English)
A neighbor of Leocadio and worker in pharmaceutical development.

== Media ==
=== Game ===
The game was developed and published by KLab using the Unity game engine. It was released in Japan on April 23, 2019, on Android and iOS. Mobimon licensed the game for global release in October 2020. The Japanese version ended service on March 31, 2021, while Global version ended service on February 25, 2022, due to expired licensing rights.

=== Anime ===
An anime adaptation was announced on March 24, 2018, and aired on April 23, 2020. The series was produced by Yokohama Animation Lab and aired from October 13 to December 29, 2020, on Tokyo MX, BS11, Wowow, and MBS. The opening theme "Kimi wo Sukueru nara Boku wa Naninimo naru" (君を救えるなら僕は何にでもなる; "I Can Do Anything if I Can Save You") was performed by Maon Kurosaki, while the ending theme "Disclose" was performed by Helical. In Southeast Asia, the series is licensed by Muse Communication and released on YouTube. Funimation acquired the series and streamed it on its website in North America and the British Isles.

==== Episode list ====
No.	Title	Directed by	Written by	Original release date
1	"THE GETAWAY -Part One-"	Kōji Kobayashi, Masaoki Nakajima	Naoto Hosoda	October 13, 2020
The episode starts with a glimpse of an imminent future then returns to the present. A speech is given to the audience about the Imperial capital's current situation, reporting activity of mutant monsters, circulation of illegal firearms, and an increased number of crimes by citizens in public, which have escalated into riots. At a warehouse, a man named Innumael Grauer is scolded for gambling on work weekends by the boss. On seeing them imperial soldier Leonardo offers to help him load the goods, who accidentally loads the package onto the truck, and hurries off to his first day of work. A group tracking the package realises it was loaded mistakenly. The captain of the Imperial Army platoon that Leocadio joins informs him of the extreme activity of the smuggling organisation Headkeeper, who is preparing to retrieve the package, when Innumael arrives at a checkpoint. A guard opens the package and finds heavy weaponry and glowing chemical tubes which immediately gets Innumael arrested, locked up, and being held to be interrogated by Leocadio's platoon. Headkeeper breaks him out of jail along with the retrieved package. As they notice they are being followed by the imperial army, they try to get away from the platoon, and instead intercept the heavy weaponry that Innumael unknowingly smuggled. While fighting, Helman, the squad captain, brutally injures Damian, while Innumael kills Seitz to save Schaake.
2	"THE GETAWAY -Part Two-"	Tamaki Nakatsu	Naoto Hosoda	October 20, 2020
Schakke uses her rod to cause an explosion and cover Headkeeper's escape to safehouse Headkeeper by a sympathizer called Gizrella. As Leocadio mourns the death of Seitz, Helman convinces him to join his investigation of Headkeeper so he can avenge Seitz. After finding and torturing another Headkeeper sympathizer, the Empire raids the town Headkeeper is hiding at and Gizrella attempts to distract them so Headkeeper can escape but is captured by Leocadio. Schaake causes an explosion at the local armory while Innumael disguises himself as an Imperial soldier to rescue Gizrella and reunite her with her daughter, who is suffering from a terminal disease and only has six months to live. Although Headkeeper escapes, Helman gathers information on Innumael, including his sister. Meanwhile, Elfriede, a spy working for Headkeeper, infiltrates an Imperial base, searching for useful information, until she comes across a safe.
3	"Of Creatures and Men"	Ryūta Ono	Yūichirō Momose	October 27, 2020
Elfriede meets up with her superior and reveals that a member of Headkeeper has been supplying funds to the Ministry of Energy, an agency under the direct control of the emperor. Until they can find the traitor, all Headkeeper can do now is follow the money and uncover what it is being used for. Meanwhile, Schaake's team travels across Altar Forest to reach their next hideout in the Gutheil domain until they come across a dead body. Their car breaks down, forcing Schaake, Benjamin and a reluctant Innumael to walk to a nearby village to request some spare parts. There, the villagers reveal to the group that a monster has been killing their people in these past few days and some of them have gone missing. Schaake offers to find any survivors, so they head back in the forest, where Innumael finds a little girl, Yazmin, but they are ambushed by the creature that has been hunting and killing the villagers. Upon safely returning Yazmin to the village, Hanoi, the village elder, informs Schaake's team that, ten years ago, the Empire built a research facility near the village, but some animals used for research escaped and Hanoi has reasons to believe that one of these creatures has been killing the villagers. Schaake's team investigates the ruins of the lab, where they find the creature. Innumael realizes the creature's hearing makes it very sensitive to noise, so he causes as much noise as possible, disorienting the creature enough for him to kill it. With the creature dead, Schaake's team offers to continue search for the missing villagers but Hanoi declines. As Headkeeper leaves, Yazmin investigates the dead creature's body and realizes the creature is actually her own mother, mutated by the Empire's experiments. Meanwhile, Helman orders Leocadio to find Innumael's sister.
4	"Live with Honor, Die with No Pride"	Xinya Cai	Yūichirō Momose	November 3, 2020
Leocadio and Conrad arrive at the village where Sissel, Innumael's sister, lives at and informs her about Innumael's actions. Although she is horrified upon learning that her brother has killed someone, Sissel agrees to come to the capital as a person of interest. Leocadio also begins to doubt that Innumael is really a member of Headkeeper. Meanwhile, Elfriede is tasked with infiltrating an Imperial laboratory that holds clues to the traitor and the money he gave to the Diet. There, she finds that the Empire is conducting research on live human subjects. Unfortunately, she triggers an alarm and is captured. At the capital, Helman is called to a meeting conducted Mary Bult, a prominent member of the Diet. Mary calls for a massive operation to quash Headkeeper's operations at the capital. Schaake's team reaches the Gutheil domain and Innumael is forced to put on a disguise to avoid recognition, while Schaake reveals herself to be a member of the Gutheil family.
5	"From Gutheil with Love"	Motohiro Abe	Yūichirō Momose	November 10, 2020
As Schaake returns to her family's mansion, Klaus tasks Innumael to buy an expensive bottle of wine for the leader of Headkeeper's local branch. Although he successfully buys the bottle, he later gives it to a boy who tasked to buy it for his abusive father. He returns to the Headkeeper base empty-handed, only to find out that the boy works for Jade, the leader of the branch, who had sent the boy to test Innumael's loyalty to Headkeeper. Jade informs the team that one of their spies, Elfriede, has been captured by the Imperial army and now, they must rescue her. Although the branch leader offers Innumael the opportunity to relocate to another city with low Imperial activity, Innumael decides to go on the rescue mission after Klaus asks him to find whatever Elfriede was investigating before she was captured. At the capital, Leocadio brings Sissel to Helman, only to discover that Sissel was arrested because she was the only connection to the only known member of Headkeeper. Leocadio goes to her cell and personally apologizes to Sissel, who asks him to give her pendant to Innumael should they see each other again. Meanwhile, Schaake's father, the duke of Guthiel, confines her to the city after learning that the Imperial army will crack down on Headkeeper's activity throughout the nation. He is secretly aware of her daughter's involvement with Headkeeper and hopes to draw suspicion away from her.
6	"Rogue Infiltration"	Michita Shiraishi	Naoto Hosoda	November 17, 2020
Members of Headkeeper gather at one of their hideouts in the capital, where they enact a rescue operation for one of their comrades trapped inside a lab. The captured spy, Elfriede, has gathered information on the Empire's activities, information that Klaus requested because his sister is suffering from luminosis, the same disease affecting Gizrella's daughter. As Arnold and Benjamin infiltrate the lab in which Elfriede was captured, Innumael overhears a conversation between Leocadio and his fellow soldiers. He realizes the Empire is already aware of Headkeeper's plans and goes on to inform Arnold and Benjamin, but not before having to escape from Imperial soldiers. Arnold and Benjamin locate Elfriede, who had been used as a test subject for the Empire's experiments. Unfortunately, Professor Radovaud, the scientist in charge of the lab, turns Elfriede and the other subjects into monsters using light magic. The monsters go on a rampage all over the city, while Elfriede attacks Arnold and Benjamin.
7	"Rogue Operation"	Tōru Takahashi	Naoto Hosoda	November 24, 2020
As the Imperial army fights the rampaging monsters, Innumael's group returns to the hideout, only to find Helman already waiting for them. Innumael and his new friend, Irma, escape to an abandoned residential area located underground, where they are ambushed by both Imperial soldiers and the mutated Elfriede. An explosion caused by a grenade separates Innumael from Irma and he is forced to work alongside Conrad to return to the surface. As they explore the ruined city, they find a pit of cold fire. Meanwhile, the Empire is making efforts to move the capital to a new city and the Emperor leaves Mary in charge of the old capital while he goes on to take care of his wife and unborn child.
8	"Rogue Ultimatum"	Tamaki Nakatsu	Naoto Hosoda	December 1, 2020
Innumael and Conrad come across Helman, who has brought Sissel to the residential area as a hostage and threatens her life to execute Innumael, against Conrad's protests. Suddenly, a mutated Elfriede attacks Helman, giving Innumael, Sissel and Conrad enough time to escape. When Elfriede attacks Innumael, a timely intervention from Schaake and Irma saves him. Helman attempts to kill Sissel, forcing Leocadio to kill him. While Innumael and Sissel reunite, a dying Elfriede reveals that a traitor among Headkeeper's ranks has been leaking information to the Imperial army, which is how they learned about the rescue operation in the capital and asks Innumael to give her pendant to Lord Georg Eszterhazy, a high-ranking member of the Holy Knights. Having killed an Imperial officer, Leocadio has no choice but to join Headkeeper and investigate the Empire's corruption.
9	"State of the Empire"	Xinya Cai, Masaoki Nakajima	Yūichirō Momose	December 8, 2020
After informing Helman's wife about his death, Leocadio is reassigned to a new unit. He also visits Conrad at the hospital, where Conrad reveals he has been infected with luminosis after being exposed to cold fire for so long. Conrad also suspects Innumael to be infected with luminosis, as well. Leocadio and Irma ask Faust about luminosis, and Faust replies that originally, there was no treatment for luminosis, until an antagonist drug was developed recently. Leocadio and Irma inform Faust that this drug was probably developed through illegal research, including human experimentation, and Faust agrees to help them. Unfortunately, Leocadio is arrested by his new commander on suspicion of stealing important documents. He is sentenced to work at the mines, where he meets Damian, a prisoner who was also tortured by Helman. Leocadio reluctantly joins Damian's plan to escape the prison, but he is captured and thrown into a solitary confinement cell with an air ventilation shaft connected to the room of Minerva Guthiel, Schaake's mother. Meanwhile, Schaake and her friends travel to Fiction, the Empire's new capital, and attempt to visit Lord Georg's home.
10	"Break Free"	Toshiya Niidome	Yūichirō Momose	December 15, 2020
Lord George informs Schaake's team about the Garnet Tablet, a stone with a prophecy about a future disaster the Empire is trying to prevent by moving the capital to a new city and constructing a device called the Luminous Seed, which can contain the power of cataclysmic light. The development of the Luminous Seed attracted the attention of an anti-imperialist faction within Headkeeper, and one of its members, Minerva, was tasked with finding him, but she was captured and sent to prison. The leader of this faction, Mary Bult of the Diet, has also been using Headkeeper's money to fund anti-imperialist operations. Lord Georg asks Innumael to talk to the Emperor, who is just celebrating the birth of his daughter. Meanwhile, Leocadio hears the exact same story about the Garnet Tablet and the Luminous Seed from Minerva, who asks Leocadio to recover the Luminous Seed. After he is taken back to his cell, Leocadio meets up with Damian, who just recovered the keys to their cell. Unfortunately, Damian betrays Leocadio and escapes, while throwing dynamite into Leocadio's cell and causing an explosion that alerts the guards. Leocadio uses his bed to shield himself from the explosion and escapes into the prison's subterranean tunnels, where he and Damian are attacked by Helman, who has been mutated into a monster. Damian sacrifices himself to kill Helman while Leocadio escapes from the prison.
11	"An Inconvenient Prophecy"	Tetsuo Nakagawa, Keisuke Nishijima	Naoto Hosoda	December 22, 2020
Leocadio reunites with Innumael's group at the hospital Conrad is staying at, where they discuss their next move. Conrad and Innumael reveal to each other they are infected with Luminosis but haven't told their friends yet. Leocadio finally confronts Innumael about Seitz's death and agrees to work together until they finish their mission. Faust agrees to help Innumael and Benjamin infiltrate the facility developing the anti-Luminosis drug In exchange for research papers on the development of said drug, while Leocadio and Arnold infiltrate the Empire's military headquarters to steal the Luminous Seed. Although the mission to recover the Seed is successful, Leocadio and Arnold are forced to fight their way out of the Empire's headquarters, while Innumael stumbles upon the research notes of Radovaud, who reveals he has been mutating humans into monsters to satisfy his curiosity about the cataclysmic light, the source of cold fire. Suddenly, one of Mary Bult's agents uses a replica of the Luminous Seed to cause a massive explosion of cataclysmic light that devastates a huge portion of the old capital.
12	"The Hand that Rocks the Cradle"	Kōji Kobayashi	Naoto Hosoda	December 29, 2020
The explosion of cataclysmic light causes the capital's inhabitants to become monsters as Leocadio to realize that the Luminous Seed he just recovered was a fake. As Irma reunites with Arnold, the Imperial army prepares to activate a device called the Cradle, which will isolate the capital from the rest of the Empire to prevent the cataclysmic light from spreading. Both Innumael and Radovaud are mutated by the light and Innumael barely incapacitates Radovaud before giving into his monstrous instincts and attacking Leocadio, who attempts to make Innumael remember his sister thanks to the pendant she gave him. Leocadio is forced to severely injure Innumael, but Innumael becomes human enough to give Leocadio the information he found about Luminosis. After the fight, Leocadio reunites with Irma and Arnold and they escape from the city, intending to reunite with their comrades. At the same time, Schaake and Claus, who has just killed Jade for betraying Headkeeper, make their way to the old capital to make sure their friends are safe. As Mary Bult assumes command of Fiction and the Empire, the old capital falls into chaos. Benjamin, who barely survived the explosion, and Innumael, who has regained his human form, stumble upon the Queen, who has been reduced to a homeless beggar and asks Innumael to protect his daughter.
