= Miyu =

- Pronunciation: Mí-yú
- Gender: Unisex

Origin
- Origin: Japanese
- Meaning: It can have many different meanings depending on the kanji used.
- Region of origin: Japanese

Miyu is a unisex Japanese given name.

== Written forms ==
Miyu can be written using different kanji characters and can mean:

- 自由, "self, reason"
- 美侑, "beauty, assist"
- 美結, "beauty, bind"
- 美夢, "beauty, dream"
- 美夕, "beauty, evening"
- 美唯, "beauty, only"
- 美由, "beauty, reason"
- 深優, "deep, tenderness"
- 実由, "fruit, reason"; "truth, reason"
- 実結, "fruit, bind"; "truth, bind"
- 心由, "heart, reason"
- 海由, "sea, reason"
- 未夢, "sheep, dream"
- 未由, "sheep, reason"
- 未祐, "sheep, help"
- 光由, "light, reason"

The name can also be written in hiragana (みゆ) or katakana ミユ.

== People with the name ==
- Miyu Amasaki (天咲 光由; born 2002), Japanese professional wrestler
- Miyu Fujisaki (藤崎 未夢; born 2000), Japanese idol of the idol group NGT48
- Miyu Hasegawa (長谷川 美優; born 2001), Japanese field hockey player
- Miyu Honda (本田 望結; born 2004), Japanese actress, tarento and figure skater
- Miyu Irino (入野 自由; born 1988), Japanese actor and singer
- Miyu Kataoka (片岡 未優; born 1999), Japanese former idol of the idol group Niji no Conquistador
- Miyu Kato (table tennis) (加藤 美優; born 1999), Japanese table tennis player
- Miyu Kato (tennis) (加藤 未唯; born 1994), Japanese professional tennis player
- Miyu Kirino (桐乃 みゆ; born 2001), Japanese idol of the idol group Niji no Conquistador
- Miyu Kubota (久保田 未夢; born 1995), Japanese voice actress and idol
- Miyu Maeda (前田 美優; born 1996), Japanese table tennis player
- Miyu Matsukawa (松川 みゆ; born 2008), Japanese idol of the idol group SKE48
- Miyu Matsuki (松来 未祐; 1977–2015), Japanese voice actress and singer
- Miyu Matsuo (松尾 美佑; born 2004), Japanese idol of the idol group Nogizaka46
- Miyu Mizumachi (水町 みゆ; born 2001), Japanese women's professional shogi player
- Miyu Nagaoka (長岡 望悠; born 1991), Japanese volleyball player
- Miyu Nagasaki (長﨑 美柚; born 2002), Japanese table tennis player
- Miyu Nagase (長瀬 実夕; born 1988), Japanese singer, guitarist and a former member of the band Zone (band)
- Miyu Nakasaka (中坂 美祐; born 2005), Japanese idol of the idol group SKE48
- Miyu Nakashio (中塩 美悠; born 1996), Japanese figure skater
- Miyu Namba (難波 実夢; born 2002), Japanese swimmer
- Miyu Otsuka (大塚 美優; born 1994), Japanese swimmer
- Miyu Sato (佐藤 心結; born 2003), Japanese professional golfer
- Miyu Shirako (白子 未祐; born 1995), Japanese rugby sevens player
- Miyu Suzuki (鈴木 美結; born 1999), Japanese field hockey player
- Miyu Suzumoto (鈴本 美愉; born 1997), Japanese former idol of the idol group Sakurazaka46
- Miyu Takagi (高木 美佑; born 1996), Japanese voice actress
- Miyu Takahashi (高橋 美優; born 2002), Japanese badminton player
- Miyu Takahira (高平 美憂; born 1999), Japanese professional footballer
- Miyu Takeuchi (竹内 美宥; born 1996), Japanese singer and YouTuber
- Miyu Tomita (富田 美憂; born 1999), Japanese voice actress and singer
- Miyu Uehara (上原 美優; 1987–2011), Japanese gravure idol and tarento
- Miyu Ueno (上野 美優; born 2001), Japanese curler
- Miyu Umeda (梅田 みゆ; born 2004), Japanese idol of the idol group Cutie Street
- Miyu Yagyu (柳生 美結; born 1990), Japanese actress, tarento, and fashion model
- Miyu Yakata (矢形 海優; born 1999), Japanese professional footballer
- Miyu Yamabe (山邊 未夢; born 1996), Japanese idol of the idol group Tokyo Girls' Style
- Miyu Yamada (山田 美諭; born 1993), Japanese taekwondo practitioner
- Miyu Yamashita (山下 美優; born 1995), Japanese professional wrestler in promotion Tokyo Jyoshi Pro Wrestling
- Miyu Yoshimoto (吉本 実憂; born 1996), Japanese actress, idol, and tarento

== Fictional characters ==
- Miyu (美夕), main character in the anime series Vampire Princess Miyu
- Miyu, non-playable Mii opponent in the Wii series
- Miyu Edelfelt (美遊・エーデルフェルト), a character in the manga series Fate/kaleid liner Prisma Illya
- Miyu (ミユ), character from the game Star Fox 2
- Miyu Greer (深優), character in the anime Mai-HiME
- Miyu, Dr. Sado's cat in Space Battleship Yamato
- Miyu Kozuki, character in the anime series UFO Baby
- Miyu Aida, character in the anime series Ro-Kyu-Bu!
- Miyu Kasumizawa, character from the game Blue Archive
- Miyu Sakurada, character from the game D4DJ

== See also ==
- Miyū
