= Kenichirou Matsuda =

Japanese voice actor

- 松田 健一郎
- Born: 22 January 1978 (age 48); Saitama Prefecture, Japan
- Occupation: Voice actor
- Notable work: Ghost in the Shell: Arise as Batou; Clockwork Planet as Vainney Halter; Vinland Saga as Thors; Black Clover as Gordon Agrippa; Magatsu Wahrheit: Zuerst as Arnold; Engage Kiss as Miles Morgan; Spy x Family as the narrator and Bond Forger; Highspeed Etoile as Richard Parker

Kenichirou Matsuda (Japanese: 松田 健一郎, Hepburn: Matsuda Ken'ichirō; born 22 January 1978) is a Japanese voice actor from Saitama Prefecture, affiliated with Arts Vision. He is known for starring as Batou in Ghost in the Shell: Arise, Vainney Halter in Clockwork Planet, Jacques Yvain in RErideD: Derrida, who leaps through time, Thors in Vinland Saga, Gordon Agrippa in Black Clover, Arnold in Magatsu Wahrheit: Zuerst, Miles Morgan in Engage Kiss, the narrator and Bond Forger in Spy x Family, Richard Parker in Highspeed Etoile, and Marcella Nuvolari in Dahlia in Bloom.

== Biography ==
Kenichirou Matsuda, a native of Saitama Prefecture, was born on 22 January 1978. As an elementary school student, he learned about voice acting after hearing his two older sisters were interested in such a career, but stopped watching anime because he thought it was "something for kids to watch", so he instead wanted to be a baseball player or a police officer. During his early adulthood, he attended a legal vocational school with the goal of becoming a civil servant, but dropped out after not being able to keep up with a higher class he was moved into. Enrolled into the Japan Narration Acting Institute, he considered quitting after three years and a third failed audition, but instead continued, and the following year he was accepted into Arts Vision.

In February 2013, it was announced that he would voice Batou in Ghost in the Shell: Arise. Jaclyn Appelgate of Comic Book Resources said Matsuda "captures Batou's rough personality and does especially well with expressing the character's rage". He later reprised his role in the 2015 movie Ghost in the Shell: The New Movie, and he later starred as Vainney Halter in Clockwork Planet and Jacques Yvain in RErideD: Derrida, who leaps through time.

In February 2019, Matsuda was cast as Thors, a major character in Vinland Saga. Regarding his performance of Thors, Appelgate said "Kenichiro may have not had many lines with Thors since the character is a man of few words, but the voice actor managed to balance Thors' strong appearance with his massive compassion, using a deep masculine voice with soft undertones." He later starred as Arnold in Magatsu Wahrheit: Zuerst and Miles Morgan in Engage Kiss.

Matsuda originally considering retirement after several unsuccessful auditions, but in April 2022, he began voicing the narrator of Spy x Family, and in October 2022, he started voicing main character Bond Forger. Matsuda uses several different barks to express Bond's emotions, with different ones to express happiness and sadness. Appelgate said of his performance of Bond: "when it comes to how the dog sounds when he does open his mouth, Kenichiro adds a nice, subtle layer of charm to this gentle giant with his iconic "borf" speech." In 2024, he starred as Richard Parker in Highspeed Etoile and Marcella Nuvolari in Dahlia in Bloom.

== Filmography ==
=== Animated television ===
Year	Title	Role(s)	Ref
2007	Darker than Black		
2007	Moribito: Guardian of the Spirit		
2013	Ghost in the Shell: Arise	Batou	
2014	D-Frag!	Hiroshi Nagayama	
2014	Dramatical Murder	Mink	
2014	Marvel Disk Wars: The Avengers	The Hulk	
2016	Reikenzan: Hoshikuzu-tachi no Utage	Iemoto	
2016	Soul Buster	Wei Yan	
2017	Black Clover	Narrator, Gordon Agrippa	
2017	Clockwork Planet	Vainney Halter	
2017	ēlDLIVE	Riggs	
2017	Kino's Journey	Riku	
2017	Marvel Future Avengers	The Hulk	
2018	Conception	Shangri-la	
2018	RErideD: Derrida, who leaps through time	Jacques Yvain	
2019	Kemono Michi: Rise Up	Wolfgang von Kraftman	
2019	Kochoki	Hayashi Hidesada	
2019	Vinland Saga	Thors	
2020	Healin' Good Pretty Cure	Teruhiko Hiramitsu	
2020	Magatsu Wahrheit: Zuerst	Arnold	
2020	My Hero Academia	Yū Hōjō	
2020	The Day I Became a God	Raita Oguma	
2021	Bakuten!!	Shūji Mabuchi	
2021	Kingdom	Kaioku	
2021	Rumble Garanndoll	Ukai	
2021	Shaman King	Luchist	
2022	Engage Kiss	Miles Morgan	
2022	Spy x Family	Narrator, Bond Forger	
2022	The Genius Prince's Guide to Raising a Nation Out of Debt	Bartholorush	
2022	Tribe Nine	Roku Saigo	
2023	Dog Signal	Woolson	
2023	The Faraway Paladin	Gelrays	
2024	The Unwanted Undead Adventurer	Clope	
2024	Dahlia in Bloom	Marcella Nuvolari	
2024	Highspeed Etoile	Richard Parker	
2024	Quality Assurance in Another World	Sumida	
2024	Tower of God	Kosuke/Kang Horyang	
2025	Übel Blatt	Geranpen	
2025	Let's Play	Edgar	
2026	Eren the Southpaw	Ifū Sakuma	
2026	The Frontier Lord Begins with Zero Subjects	Dias	
2027	Tenkaichi: The Greatest Warrior Under the Rising Sun	Honda Tadakatsu	

=== Animated film ===
Year	Title	Role(s)	Ref
2015	Ghost in the Shell: The New Movie	Batou	
2015	Sleep Tight My Baby, Cradled in the Sky	Yasunori Shionoha	
2017	Blade Runner Black Out 2022	Iggy	
2017	Mobile Suit Gundam Thunderbolt: Bandit Flower	Bull	
2019	Human Lost	Shibuta	
2022	Touken Ranbu: Hanamaru: Setsugetsuka	Nenekirimaru	
2022	The First Slam Dunk	Chuichirou Noma	
2024	Dead Dead Demon's Dededede Destruction	Takarada	

=== Original video animation ===
Year	Title	Role(s)	Ref
2016	Mobile Suit Gundam: The Origin	Ortega	

=== Original net animation ===
Year	Title	Role(s)	Ref
2019	Kengan Ashura	Hollis Kure	
2026	Steel Ball Run: JoJo's Bizarre Adventure	Pocoloco	

=== Video games ===
Year	Title	Role(s)	Ref
2012	DRAMAtical Murder	Mink	
2012	Street Fighter X Tekken	Raven, Jack-X	
2019	Our World is Ended	Shiro Deguchi	
2019	Life Is Strange 2	Jonathan Merrill	
2025	Fatal Fury: City of the Wolves	Marco Rodrigues	

=== Dubbing ===
- The Beckoning Silence (Toni Kurtz (Roger Schäli))
- BlacKkKlansman (Detective Ron Stallworth (John David Washington))
- Blood Ties (Chris Pierzynski (Clive Owen))
- Deep Blue Sea 3 (Eugene Shaw (Emerson Brooks))
- Doomsday (Sergeant Norton (Adrian Lester))
- Fast & Furious (Roman Pearce (Tyrese Gibson))
- Fireproof (Wayne Floyd (Stephen Dervan))
- Jersey Boys (Nick Massi (Michael Lomenda))
- The Maze Runner (Alby (Aml Ameen))
- The Night Before (Chris Roberts (Anthony Mackie))
- The Perfect Host (Detective Morton (Nathaniel Parker))
- Rogue Hostage (Kyle Snowden (Tyrese Gibson))
- Young Justice, Kaldur'ahm
