= Yuu Kamiya =

Brazilian-Japanese novelist and illustrator

Yuu Kamiya 榎宮 祐
- Born: Thiago Furukawa Lucas; 10 November 1984 (age 42) Uberaba, Minas Gerais, Brazil
- Areas: Novelist, illustrator
- Notable works: No Game No Life; Clockwork Planet
- Spouse: Mashiro Hiiragi (m. 2011)
- Children: 1

Thiago Furukawa Lucas (born 10 November 1984), who goes by his pen name Yuu Kamiya (榎宮 祐, Kamiya Yū), is a Brazilian-Japanese novelist and illustrator. He worked on Takaya Kagami's light novel adaptation of A Dark Rabbit Has Seven Lives. In 2013, he then worked on writing and illustrating his own light novel series No Game No Life which has been adapted into anime, was listed as one of the top-selling light novels in 2014 and was one of ten light novel series to receive a Yomiuri Shimbun Sugoi Japan Award. In 2015, his newer light novel and manga series Clockwork Planet was greenlit for an anime adaptation. In 2011, he married Mashiro Hiiragi, who would work on the manga adaptation of No Game No Life.

== Career ==
Kamiya is of Japanese, Portuguese and Italian descent. He was born in Brazil, spent his childhood in Brazil, and moved to Japan at the age of 7 where he lives currently. He became a naturalized Japanese citizen in 2025.

In elementary school, he was bullied due to being a foreigner, and in junior high school he did not go to school and played video games instead. In high school, he started drawing and began working in dо̄jin, but for his first dо̄jinshi sales event, he sold zero copies. However, at the request of an industry insider who saw his dо̄jin magazine, his color illustrations and manga were published in the 3rd volume of the MELTY BLOOD Anthology, making his commercial debut while still in high school.

In November 2005, Kamiya appeared in Dengeki Comic Gao! with his series E.A.r.T.h, making his official mangaka debut. This series finished with 4 volumes in April 2008.

In February 2008, he began publishing Gurīdo Paketto ∞ in ASCII Media Works's Dengeki Maoh magazine. Gurīdo Paketto ∞ has been in an indefinite hiatus since August 2011 since Kamiya was diagnosed with stomach cancer in May of the same year.

In November 2008, he started illustrating for the light novel series A Dark Rabbit Has Seven Lives by Takaya Kagami. This series became a hit and was made into an anime in July 2011.

In April 2012, Kamiya started publishing the light novel series No Game, No Life which he wrote and illustrated himself. The series was a success and an anime adaptation was announced in July 2013, which aired from April to June 2014.

In April 2013, Kamiya's second light novel series Clockwork Planet, in joint authorship with Tsubaki Himana, began publishing.

Both No Game, No Life and Clockwork Planet have been adapted to manga with Kamiya writing and Mashiro Hiiragi illustrating. According to Kamiya, this is his "de facto return" to the manga business.

== Personal life ==
When discussing the origin of his pen name, he said he liked the sound of "Kamiya" and wanted 神谷 (Kamiya) to be his surname, however Kamiya said that he was afraid to call himself using these kanji so he split the name into two parts, "Ka" and "miya." He then converted each portion with his eyes closed for a few seconds before landing on "榎" (Ka) and "宮" (miya) respectively. As for "Yū" (祐), Kamiya believes he took it from the name of the main protagonist of Kanon, Yuichi Aizawa, which he was passionate about at the time.

His style of illustration is often called Kamiya-nuri (榎宮塗り, lit. Kamiya-coating), which describes the vivid rainbow-coloring his illustrations usually have.

Kamiya initially worked as an illustrator, but later focused on being a mangaka. When his first light novel illustration job, Iregyrāzu Paradaizu, was terminated for undisclosed reasons, he wanted to try his hand at manga where he alone was responsible for everything. For this reason, Kamiya rarely takes many illustration jobs for light novels and is also why he has turned down manga adaptation job offers.

He is a fan of the Touhou Project series of games, many illustrations present on his official website of characters like Suwako Moriya and Flandre Scarlet.

In May 2011, Kamiya was diagnosed with stomach cancer. He was discharged from the hospital in August and is still undergoing treatment for cancer prevention. After the diagnosis, he decided to focus on writing light novels due to it being more compatible with treatment.

In August 2011, Kamiya married his manga assistant, Mashiro Hiiragi. On May 7, 2015, it was reported that he and Mashiro Hiiragi had a child together.

== Works ==
List of Kamiya's major works
Title	Year	Notes	Refs
E.A.r.T.h (エアリセ, Earise)	2006	Published by Dengeki Comics, 4 volumes released	
Greed Packet Unlimited (グリードパケット∞)	2008	Spin-off to Earth series Published by ASCII Media Works in 4 volumes	
A Dark Rabbit Has Seven Lives light novels Illustrator; written by Takaya Kagami	2008		
No Game No Life light novels	2012–present	Imprinted by MF Bunko J Published by Media Factory in 12 volumes	
No Game No Life manga illustrated by Mashiro Hiiragi, Yuu Kamiya	2013–present	Serialized in Monthly Comic Alive; Published by Media Factory in 2 volumes	
Clockwork Planet light novels with Tsubaki Himana, illustrated by Shino	2013–2015	Published by Kodansha in 4 volumes	
Clockwork Planet manga with Tsubaki Himana, illustrated by Kuro	2013–2018	Serialized in Monthly Shonen Sirius; Published by Kodansha in 10 volumes	
