= Good Luck! Ninomiya-kun =

Japanese light novel series

- Cover of the first light novel

ご愁傷さま二ノ宮くん (Goshūshō-sama Ninomiya-kun)
- Genre: Romantic comedy, Harem
- Light novel
- Written by: Daisuke Suzuki
- Illustrated by: Kyōrin Takanae
- Published by: Fujimi Shobo
- Imprint: Fujimi Fantasia Bunko
- Magazine: Dragon Magazine
- Original run: September 18, 2004 – January 20, 2009
- Volumes: 17
- Manga
- Written by: Daisuke Suzuki
- Illustrated by: Haiji Suzuro; Reiji Hamada
- Published by: Fujimi Shobo
- Magazine: Monthly Dragon Age
- Original run: October 2007 – October 2008
- Volumes: 4
- Anime television series
- Directed by: Kōji Yoshikawa
- Produced by: Tsuneo Takechi; Naoshi Imamoto; Tomoko Suzuki; Yuka Harada
- Written by: Hiroshi Watanabe
- Music by: Kōichirō Kameyama
- Studio: AIC Spirits
- Licensed by: NA: Funimation
- Original network: Chiba TV, TV Saitama
- Original run: October 4, 2007 – December 20, 2007
- Episodes: 12

Good Luck! Ninomiya-kun (Japanese: ご愁傷さま二ノ宮くん, Hepburn: Goshūshō-sama Ninomiya-kun; transl. My Condolences, Ninomiya-kun or My Heartfelt Sympathy, Ninomiya-kun) is a Japanese light novel series by Daisuke Suzuki, with illustrations by Kyōrin Takanae. The light novel started serialization in Monthly Dragon Magazine in April 2005, published by Fujimi Shobo. A manga adaptation was serialized in the shōnen manga magazine Monthly Dragon Age. An anime adaptation by AIC Spirits first aired in Japan on October 4, 2007. Two radio dramas for the series have been broadcast.

== Plot ==
Shungo Ninomiya, a high school guy, lives in a large house with his older sister Ryōko, who works as a mercenary. One day, Ryōko sends the siblings Mayu and Mikihiro Tsukimura to live with them. Mayu's goal is to overcome her fear of men and to control her powers, however, she is a young succubus, a creature that naturally attracts men. Ryōko and Mikihiro have Mayu and Shungo share everything from the same room to the same bed. Making things more awkward, Shungo's jealous childhood friend, student council president Reika Hōjō, joins the household as a maid.

== Characters ==
Shungo Ninomiya (二ノ宮 峻護, Ninomiya Shungo)
Voiced by: Junji Majima, Ayahi Takagaki (young), Takuma Terashima (first radio drama)
Shungo, the title character, is a high school guy who trains in martial arts. He often shows self-restraint from his female schoolmates, who enjoy flirting with and teasing him. He and Reika are childhood friends, but he is put in a situation where he must host and live together with Mayu.
Mayu Tsukimura (月村 真由, Tsukimura Mayu)
Voiced by: Mai Kadowaki, Umeka Shouji (young), Yuko Goto (first radio drama)
Mayu is a succubus who is sent to live with Shungo to practice getting over her fear of men. Because she cannot control her powers, she naturally attracts men as if they were zombies, and knocks them out with her power when they get too close. Her clumsiness and ditzy personality often get her in embarrassing situations such as spraying herself with water while wearing a tight white shirt or frequently falling on top of Shungo. However, she is sometimes lucky in getting out of dangerous situations, as demonstrated in the remote island storyline. She wears bat-wing hair clips. It is later revealed that she, Reika, and Shungo have known each other as childhood friends.
Reika Houjou (北条 麗華, Hōjō Reika)
Voiced by: Miyuki Sawashiro, Yuki Matsuoka (first radio drama)
Reika is the student council president at Shungo's school, and an heiress to a large conglomerate called the Houjou Group. She acts proud and haughty, and bothers Shungo regularly. However, after being filmed in an embarrassing video where she fails to seduce Shungo, she agrees to become Shungo's maid and lives with him. It is later revealed that she is a succubus who harbors a dark and serious alternate personality that occasionally manifests, as well as a past childhood relationship with Shungo. In the anime, she is involved in many of the Houjou Group's businesses including influencing national policies, meeting with dignitaries, and creating corporate products. In the anime, her alternate personality tries to take Shungo for herself.
Ryoko Ninomiya (二ノ宮 涼子, Ninomiya Ryōko)
Voiced by: Michiko Neya, Naomi Shindou (first radio drama)
Shungo's older sister works as a mercenary. In the anime, she joins the school staff as a nurse. She carries a camcorder and director's megaphone where she films and directs Mayu in roleplaying situations where she has to romantically interact with Shungo.
Mikihiro Tsukimura (月村 美樹彦, Tsukimura Mikihiro)
Voiced by: Ken Narita, Daisuke Hirakawa (first radio drama)
Mikihiro is Mayu's older brother. He is an incubus, the male counterpart of a succubus. He enjoys manipulating Reika and others to do what he wants. He and Ryōko are long-time friends, as they are often seen working together, even in flashbacks. In the anime episode where Shungo searches for ramen ingredients, Mikihiro happens to own the related businesses: a wheat farm, an animal ranch, and a fishing boat.
Mitsuru Hosaka (保坂 光流, Hosaka Mitsuru)
Voiced by: Kouki Miyata, Yuka Inokuchi (first radio drama)
Mitsuru is a senior student to Shungo, and Reika's main assistant both at school and at home. He has martial arts abilities that rival Shungo's.
Shinobu Kirishima (霧島 しのぶ, Kirishima Shinobu)
Voiced by: Saeko Chiba
Kirishima is the head maid for Reika's family. She carries a wakizashi sword, ready to execute Shungo, whom she thinks is not worthy of Reika. She uses Japanese honorifics towards Reika, but quickly reverts to blunt speech towards Shungo. In the anime, she joins the cast after the gang spend a vacation on a private island.
Hinako Ayakawa
Hinako is Shungo's classmate with the short hair. She likes to tease Shungo, and later befriends Mayu.
Irori Okushiro
Shungo's classmate with the long green hair and glasses. She flirts with Shungo, and is later revealed to be a succubus when she kisses him and drains his energy during the class field trip. However, she later reveals it was a ploy to win the affections of a jealous Tasuku, whom she really loves.
Tasuku Okushiro
Shungo's schoolmate with short green hair. He tries to interfere in Shungo and Mayu's relationship in order to get revenge from a fight many years ago, and is jealous because Irori kissed Shungo.

== Media ==
=== Light novels ===
The series began as a light novel originally serialized in the Japanese shōnen light novel magazine Monthly Dragon Magazine in April 2005, published by Fujimi Shobo. As of September 2008, ten normal volumes under the title Goshūshō-sama Ninomiya-kun, and six smaller volumes under the title Oainiku-sama Ninomiya-kun have been published. The novels are written by Daisuke Suzuki with illustrations by Kyōrin Takanae. The series won second prize in Fujimi Shobo's Long Fantasy Novel Contest.

=== Radio dramas ===
There have been two radio dramas for the series. The first, containing five broadcasts, aired between June 25, 2006, and July 23, 2006, and was a part of the Fujimi TeenAge Fun Club. These broadcasts were later compiled into a drama CD in December 2006. The second radio drama began on October 7, 2007, on the same station. The voices in the second radio drama are from the voice actors from the anime version, but the voices in the first broadcast were from different voice actors.

=== Manga ===
A manga adaptation, illustrated by Haiji Suzuro and Reiji Hamada, began serialization in Fujimi Shobo's shōnen manga magazine Monthly Dragon Age in early 2007. The first bound volume was released in October 2007, and the second was released in January 2008.

=== Anime ===
An anime adaptation by the animation studio AIC Spirits first aired in Japan on October 4, 2007, and ended on December 20, 2007, containing twelve episodes. The anime was licensed for release in English by Kadokawa USA, but its Kadokawa Pictures USA subsidiary later closed down, therefore canceling the release. The opening theme is "Yubikiri" (ユビキリ; lit. "pinky promise"), and the ending theme is "Fure Fure Pon Pon!" (ふれふれっぽんぽん!; lit. 'Go Go Pom Pom!'); both songs are sung as duets by Mai Kadowaki and Miyuki Sawashiro, who voiced Mayu and Reika respectively. Starting December 15, 2010, Crunchyroll released English subtitled episodes of the series under the title Good Luck! Ninomiya-kun. Episodes were released weekly in sets of three to the public, with the final three episodes being released on January 5, 2011.

No.	Title	Original release date
1	"I'm Going to Kiss You!"; Transliteration: "Kisu Shichae yo" (Japanese: キスしちゃえよ)	October 4, 2007
Shungo meets Mayu at his school, and learns that she has an uncanny ability to attract men. After rescuing her from their classmates, he learns that she is a succubus who has yet to control her powers; she and her brother will be living at Shungo's house so she can train to interact with men. Not only that, but Shungo and Mayu must sleep in the same bed.
2	"I'm Staying Over!"; Transliteration: "Oshikakechae yo" (Japanese: 押しかけちゃえよ)	October 11, 2007
Reika, the student council president and heiress to the Houjou foundation, greets Shungo, but becomes furious when Mayu unknowingly calls her a rich loser girl. After checking with Shungo and Mayu's siblings, she challenges Mayu to a series of contests. Although Mayu easily wins the first two rounds, Reika asks for them to be nullfied for the last round where she alone has to seduce Shungo. However, she fails to do so, and ends up becoming their live-in maid.
3	"Let's Hit the Town!"; Transliteration: "Machi e Ikō yo" (Japanese: 街へいこうよ)	October 18, 2007
Classmate Hinako Ayakawa takes Mayu out to get to know her better, while Reika attempts to get rid of Mayu by exploiting her fear of men. After being distracted by a classmate, Shungo tries to find Mayu, only to get caught in Reika's man traps.
4	"Let's Stay Home!"; Transliteration: "Rusuban Shiyō yo" (Japanese: 留守番しようよ)	October 25, 2007
While Shungo is taken away for extra fight training, Mayu attempts to help Reika with the housework, only to make more messes. When she finds a hidden passage, she and Reika explore it, but get lost and trigger a bunch of traps. They finally get out, but Ryōko punishes them for slacking off.
5	"Let's Go to the Sea!"; Transliteration: "Umi e Ikō yo" (Japanese: 海へいこうよ)	November 1, 2007
The gang go to a remote island beach for a "vacation", where Mayu starts getting closer to Shungo as Reika tries to upstage her. After witnessing Shungo invite Mayu to watch the stars together, Reika wanders off in a depression. Shungo finds her, but she changes her personality to a more aggressive girl who is also a succubus. A mysterious group of soldiers capture the two as well as Mayu.
6	"Remember!"; Transliteration: "Omoidashite yo" (Japanese: 思い出してよ)	November 8, 2007
Shungo, Mayu and Reika are captured by soldiers. Hosaka frees them, but as they try to escape, he is shot. Shungo grabs the two girls and sends them to hide. When he returns to fight the troops, he is knocked out by a mysterious woman in a Tiki mask. Reika exploits Mayu's clumsiness to trigger the various traps in the forest, spreading chaos among the enemy. She reaches Shungo and frees him, which allows him to confront the masked woman again.
7	"Cheer Up!"; Transliteration: "Genkidashite yo" (Japanese: 元気だしてよ)	November 15, 2007
Shungo falls ill after "losing his fighting spirit" and Mayu tries to nurse him back to health, with disastrous results.
8	"Let Me Eat It!"; Transliteration: "Tabesasete yo" (Japanese: 食べさせてよ)	November 22, 2007
Ryōko orders Shungo to make some ramen for her. He and Mayu spend hours trying to create the perfect ramen, only to realize that Ryōko will settle for a simple cup ramen.
9	"Take It!"; Transliteration: "Ubacchae yo" (Japanese: 奪っちゃえよ)	November 29, 2007
The class is at Kyoto on a field trip. Some of the boys try to climb the cliffside to peep at the girls baths. They later try to sneak into the girl's room but are hunted down by the various faculty members. After being taunted by Tasuku, Shungo tries to force his way in to see Mayu, only to be intercepted by Irori.
10	"Let's Go Play!"; Transliteration: "Asobi ni Ikō yo" (Japanese: 遊びにいこうよ)	December 6, 2007
Following Irori's kiss, Shungo feels lethargic, but is pressured to go with Irori until Mayu steals Shungo away and takes Reika along. The three spend the last day in Kyoto having fun together, like they did back when they were children. Tasuku tries to break them up by using his family's ninja clan to attack them. Tasuku and Shungo fight, but Irori stops them and tells Tasuku that she only loves him. Later, Shungo is surprised to see Ryoko and Mikihiro in the news; he is then arrested, while Mayu has disappeared.
11	"Don't Run Away!"; Transliteration: "Nigenaide yo" (Japanese: 逃げないでよ)	December 13, 2007
Reika's inner self has taken over, using her corporate muscle to capture Shungo. She takes him to their childhood home to have him remember his past and the promise for them to be together. When Reika drugs and later tries to mount him, her forces are attacked by Ryoko, Mikihiro and a returning Shinobu. Irori and Tasuku free Shungo. Realizing that Mayu may die without energy, he goes after her.
12	"Let's Start Walking!"; Transliteration: "Arukidasō yo" (Japanese: 歩きだそうよ)	December 20, 2007
Shungo races to find Mayu before she runs out of energy, but must deal with Reika's inner personality, who orders Hosaka to fight him. Reika's original personality comes to terms with her inner self, and takes her body back, however, she cannot cancel the orders. She restores some life to Shungo, but when Shungo delivers a knockdown blow to Hosaka, Mayu interferes and gets hit by Hosaka's punch. Shungo wants to kiss the collapsed Mayu but when Reika rushes forth, she trips and kisses her, restoring her life. With everything back to normal, Irori and Tasuku remark that Shungo has more challenges ahead.

== Reception ==
Stig Høgset of THEM Anime Reviews was critical of the anime series stating, "Basically, if you're passing by this show looking for some good, saucy fun, then keep looking. There's nothing to see here."

Anime News Network's Gabriella was similarly underwhelmed, comparing Good Luck! Ninomiya-kun to other similar genre productions, saying, "Some shows score a Perishable because they're incompetent, but those are the rare interesting ones. The vast majority of perishables are just barely functional product, not worth picking up over hundreds of other titles in the already crowded anime boob show market. Good Luck! Ninomiya-kun is one of these, a wallflower in the crowded field of fantasies about having a succubus and an heiress maid competing for your affections."
