= RErideD: Derrida, who leaps through time =

2018 anime series

- Anime key visual

RErideD-刻越えのデリダ- (Riraideddo Tokigoe no Derida)
- Created by: anticlockwise
- Anime television series
- Directed by: Takuya Satō
- Produced by: Mitsuhiro Ogata; Junichirō Tamura; Nobuhiko Kurosu; Toyokazu Nakahigashi; Kenichi Tokumura; Bruce Chiou
- Written by: Kenji Konuta
- Music by: Maiko Iuchi
- Studio: Geek Toys
- Licensed by: NA: Crunchyroll Funimation
- Original network: Tokyo MX, TV Aichi, KBS, Sun TV, TVQ, BS11
- Original run: October 3, 2018 – December 19, 2018
- Episodes: 12

RErideD: Derrida, who leaps through time (Japanese: RErideD-刻越えのデリダ-, Hepburn: Riraideddo Tokigoe no Derida) is a Japanese anime television series by director Takuya Satō and illustrator Yoshitoshi Abe. The series aired in Japan from October 3 to December 19, 2018.

== Plot ==
After spending 10 years in stasis, a robotics engineer awakens to a war-torn world and a fight for his life against machines that he and his father had a hand in creating.

== Characters ==
Derrida Yvain (デリダ・イヴェン, Derida Iven)
Voiced by: Kenshō Ono (Japanese); Adam Gibbs (English)
Derrida is an engineer who contributed to the technology of the automata called DZs that has brought forth a new civilization in the near future. He is Nathan's colleague and Jacques's son. He escaped from being pursued by Andrei and sought refuge in an underground lab, where he accidentally slips inside a cryostatis chamber. He awakens ten years later to a war-torn environment, where he meets Vidaux and Mayuka. They agree to help him find a way to end the war.
Yuri Dietrich (ユーリィ・ディートリヒ, Yūryi Dītorihi)
Voiced by: Himika Akaneya (Japanese); Natalie Hoover (English)
Yuri is Mage's friend who does photography as a hobby.
Mage Bilstein (マージュ・ビルシュタイン, Māju Birushutain)
Voiced by: M.A.O (Japanese); Bryn Apprill (English)
Mage is Nathan's daughter and Yuri's friend.
Vidaux Völker (ヴィドー・フェルカー, Vuidō Ferukā)
Voiced by: Hiro Sasaki} (Japanese); Brian Mathis (English)
Vidaux is a former police inspector turned hitman from the Destruct company who travels with Mayuka. He encounters Derrida and helps him end the war.
Mayuka (マユカ, Mayuka)
Voiced by: Kaede Hondo (Japanese); Dani Chambers (English)
Mayuka is Vidaux's adopted daughter. Vidaux killed Mayuka's biological father out of revenge after Vidaux's wife was killed in a hit-and-run.
Graham (グラハム, Gurahamu)
Voiced by: Kazutomi Yamamoto (Japanese); Howard Wang (English)
Graham is the AI navigator installed on Vidaux's custom car.
Donna (ドナ, Dona)
Voiced by: Yū Kobayashi (Japanese); Colleen Clinkenbeard (English)
Donna is a mercenary from the Destruct company nicknamed "The White Death" and hired by Andrei to kill Derrida. She was previously a researcher named Angelica Klein, who had a psychotic break following a seventeen-day lab experiment with a DZ who copied her personality.
Nathan Bilstein (ネイサン・ビルシュタイン, Neisan Birushutain)
Voiced by: Takahiro Sakurai (Japanese); Seth Magill (English)
Nathan is Derrida's colleague and Mage's father. He and Derrida found a bug in the underlying programming language of the DZs and helped Derrida create a patch, but Andrei was against authorize a recall. He is killed by Andrei when he was trying to flee the city with Derrida.
Hans Andrei (ハンス・アンドレイ, Hansu Andorei)
Voiced by: Minoru Inaba (Japanese); Phil Parsons (English)
Andrei is Derrida and Nathan's boss at the manufacturing company called Rebuild. He paid off Jacques to reject having a patch made to fix the bug in the DZs. Ten years later, he hires Donna to kill Derrida, but he later hires Schmidt to do the job when he disagrees with Donna's methods.
Jacques Yvain (ジャキス・イヴェン, Jakisu Ivuen)
Voiced by: Kenichirou Matsuda (Japanese); Ben Bryant (English)
Jacques is Derrida's father and the inventor of the DZs. He is shot to death by Andrei's agents after Derrida previously tried to give him the patch.
Schmidt Maier (シュミット・マイヤー, Shumitto Maiyā)
Voiced by: Kazuyuki Okitsu (Japanese); Garret Storms (English)
Schmidt is a government bureaucrat who is hired by Andrei to apprehend the patch from Derrida shortly after Andrei disagrees with Donna's methods.
Hund / Funt (フント, Funto)
Voiced by: Haruki Ishiya (Japanese); Brad Kurtz (English)
Hund is one of Schmidt's subordinates.
Katze (カッツェ, Kattsue)
Voiced by: Wataru Komada (Japanese); Christopher Llewyn Ramirez (English)
Katze is another one of Schmidt's subordinates.

== Production and release ==
Kadokawa originally announced the series at its Anime Expo booth on July 1, 2017, under the working title "Project D". The series was directed by Takuya Satō, written by Kenji Konuta, and animated by studio Geek Toys. Illustrator Yoshitoshi Abe provided the character designs for the series, while Koji Watanabe adapted the designs for animation. The series' music was composed by Maiko Iuchi and produced by Kadokawa. Sound for the series was directed by Yukio Nagasaki at Half HP Studio. The opening theme, "Paradox", was performed by Quadrangle, and the ending theme "Toki no Tsubasa" was performed by M.A.O and Himika Akeneya under their character names. The series consists of 12 episodes. Some characters' names allude to historical and literary figures, such as French philosopher Jacques Derrida and Chrétien de Troyes' novel Yvain, the Knight of the Lion.

The series premiered aired from October 3 to December 19, 2018, on Tokyo MX and other channels. The series is simulcasted by Crunchyroll, while Funimation produced an English dub. The first four episodes premiered on Crunchyroll on September 22, 2018. Crunchyroll and Hikari TV Channel broadcast the episodes four weeks ahead of its TV broadcast.

No.	Title	Original release date
1	"The Place He Awakened"; Transliteration: "Mezameta Basho" (Japanese: 目覚めた場所)	October 3, 2018
In the year 2050, Derrida Yvain, an engineer at a manufacturing company called Rebuild, and his colleague Nathan Bilstein report to their boss Hans Andrei that a patch is being developed after a bug has been discovered in the underlying programming language of automata called DZs, though Andrei refuses to authorize a recall. Nathan's daughter Mage Bilstein has a party for her eighth birthday, and Nathan invites Derrida and Mage's friend Yuri Dietrich to celebrate. Derrida brings a box of tuberoses as a gift, while Yuri takes many photos from her video camera to commemorate the occasion. Derrida gives Mage an access key for the patch after declining to help Nathan in his research on time leaping. The next day, Derrida frustratingly realizes that his father Jacques Yvain, inventor of the DZs, accepted a digital copy of the patch but was paid off by Andrei to not use it. At night, Mage falls unconscious while experimenting with time leaping, while Jacques is shot to death by Andrei's agents. Derrida and Nathan attempt to flee the city, but they are halted by Andrei, who has militarized the DZs and plans to frame Derrida for murdering Jacques. Nathan utters his final words for Derrida to take care of Mage. Being pursued by Andrei, Derrida is led by a hallucination of Mage into the woods. He stumbles into a secret lab and lies inside a cryostasis chamber. Upon noticing a pocket watch placed on the cryostasis chamber, Derrida awakens to a time when the city has been decimated by war.
2	"Who Is Left in the World"; Transliteration: "Sekai ni Nokosareta Mono wa" (Japanese: 世界に残されたものは)	October 10, 2018
After being attacked by several militarized DZs, Derrida is rescued by hitman Vidaux Völker, who informs Derrida that ten years have passed since the DZs caused the world to be in ruins. Derrida meets Vidaux's adopted daughter Mayuka waiting inside Graham, an AI navigator installed on Vidaux's custom car, before Vidaux drives Graham away from the battlefield full of militarized DZs. Meanwhile, Andrei learns that Derrida is still alive after disappearing for ten years. Taking a break for a quick meal, Derrida assumes the digital copy of the patch may be in possession of Andrei since Jacques had it last before he was murdered. Derrida implores Vidaux and Mayuka to help him find Mage, who may still hold the access key for the patch. Derrida, Vidaux and Mayuka head to the Bilstein residence left in ruins. Derrida briefly sees a hallucination of the eight-year-old Mage, who introduces herself as Ange. Andrei hires a mercenary named Donna to kill Derrida, though she requests the fee in advance. Derrida encounters Yuri in the backyard of the Bilstein residence, though she fires a warning shot before he reveals his identity. Yuri gives the unsettling news that Mage is dead.
3	"Those Who've Come Together"; Transliteration: "Atsumatta Mono-tachi" (Japanese: 集まった者たち)	October 17, 2018
Yuri takes Derrida, Vidaux and Mayuka to Mage's apparent gravestone, where Derrida explains that he was framed by Andrei for the deaths of Jacques and Nathan. Derrida, Yuri, Vidaux and Mayuka are suddenly attacked by Donna, who later pursues them by piloting an attack aircraft called a Canopy. While driving Graham, Vidaux takes Derrida, Yuri and Mayuka to Camp Exon, a base camp located inside a cave. Donna withdraws after blocking the entrance to the cave with debris. As Yuri begins to accept Derrida's identity, Vidaux says that the cave has an exit and asks how Derrida would eventually compensate him while making some repairs on Graham. Yuri later leads Derrida, Vidaux and Mayuka to her hometown, where they stock up on supplies at a flea market. Taking Derrida to her apartment, Yuri reveals that Mage stayed with her after Nathan's death. After the media questioned Derrida's whereabouts at that time, Yuri staged Mage's death, though Mage recently ran away last fall season. As Derrida vows to track down Mage, Ange appears to Derrida and silently warns that Yuri is in danger. When a grenade detonates in Yuri's apartment, Derrida timely catches Yuri after she jumps out of the window. Vidaux escapes with Derrida, Yuri and Mayuka in tow to the woods. It is revealed that Andrei hired two other mercenaries named Hund and Katze to kill Derrida, much to Donna's chagrin. Yuri then decides to join Derrida in tracking down Mage.
4	"The Time Leaper"; Transliteration: "Jikan Chōyakusha" (Japanese: 時間跳躍者)	October 24, 2018
Unable to obtain any information regarding Mage's whereabouts via the internet, Derrida decides that the best course of action is to infiltrate Rebuild and use the computer terminals in the lab in order to access the data directly. Since a wall called Das Band has been fortified around Rebuild, the only way inside the building is through an abandoned subway tunnel. Derrida, Yuri, Vidaux and Mayuka encounter numerous DZs with low battery power on standby, temporarily turning off Graham's sensors to tread lightly without detection. Leaving Yuri and Mayuka with Graham, both Derrida and Vidaux covertly enter the building. Vidaux warns Derrida to avoid enacting revenge, advising him to see a mirror. At the lab, Derrida hacks into Nathan's old computer, though Ange briefly appears and says that Mage has been waiting for him. After acquiring files regarding Mage's whereabouts, Derrida makes a shocking discovery. When the security alarm is triggered by Derrida's dusty footprints, Yuri is prompted to recklessly drive Graham with Mayuka in tow, picking up Derrida and Vidaux outside the building. While later analyzing the files, Derrida informs Yuri and Vidaux that the bug which caused the DZs to rampage was intentionally manufactured by Rebuild and approved by the government. Recalling a dream that he had about Mage's eighth birthday party at the Bilstein residence, Derrida surprisingly notices that the past has been altered when Yuri's video camera shows footage of him arriving late instead of early.
5	"That Which Is Not Wholly Abandoned"; Transliteration: "Sute Kirenu Mono" (Japanese: 棄てきれぬもの)	October 31, 2018
The continued search for Mage leads Derrida, Yuri, Vidaux and Mayuka to visit the Vanfort Museum of Modern Life at a city in ruins. Mayuka waits with Graham outside, while it is revealed that Vidaux was formerly a police inspector. Derrida activates a holographic celestial globe, which reawakens lost childhood memories of his previous visit to the Vanfort Museum of Modern Life with Jacques. When Donna makes a sudden appearance, Derrida and Yuri manage to dodge her attack. While Vidaux fends off Donna, Yuri tells Derrida that her video camera was damaged during the attack. After Derrida and Yuri retrieve security footage of Mage in the control room, Derrida is compelled to stop by a display of the prototype DZ that Jacques publicly unveiled at the Vanfort Museum of Modern Life in 2039. Ange appears to Derrida and sends him back to the day after Mage's eighth birthday in 2050. Derrida tried to warn Jacques that he will be killed by Andrei, but Jacques refused to avoid his demise since he already knew about the bug. In the present, Derrida eventually notices that the past has been altered again when Yuri's video camera never got damaged. Vidaux holds off Donna long enough for Derrida and Yuri to escape with him. As Derrida, Yuri, Vidaux and Mayuka leave the city, the security footage reveals that Mage was seen talking with a researcher at Rebuild named Cassiel.
6	"Those Who Search, Those Who Conceal"; Transliteration: "Saguru Mono, Kakusu Mono" (Japanese: 探る者, 隠す者)	November 7, 2018
Vidaux tells Derrida, Yuri and Mayuka that Cassiel is a hitman in the city of Garbond. Derrida then explains that a "time ride" is a way of traveling back in time that involves sending your consciousness into the body of your past self, which is based on a hypothesis known as the Trout Theory. With Graham in desperate need of repairs, Vidaux and Mayuka head into the city to find a specialized mechanic, while Derrida and Yuri occupy an abandoned house overnight. After Yuri asks Derrida about his thesis on the Trout Theory, Derrida scrolls through files from Yuri's video camera, allowing him to briefly perform a time ride at the moment when he tried to flee the city with Nathan ten years ago. Derrida then deduces that vivid memories will trigger a time ride. After performing a time ride nine times, he is unsuccessful in changing the course of history to save Nathan. As he starts to understand his limitations by jotting down notes, Derrida encourages Yuri to take a photo together. Derrida performs a time ride to a branching timeline on the night of Mage's eighth birthday, experiencing the events based on Yuri's memories. When Derrida leaves Yuri's bedroom at night, Yuri runs off and gets kidnapped. The following morning, Derrida, Vidaux and Mayuka find Yuri's video camera left behind on the ground.
7	"The Loves of Each"; Transliteration: "Sorezore no, Ai" (Japanese: それぞれの, 愛)	November 14, 2018
Yuri is being held hostage by a government bureaucrat named Schmidt Maier in the town of Bruque, the biggest population center in the area. Vidaux and Mayuka take Graham to be repaired by a specialized mechanic named Klaus Baden, while Derrida goes around town searching for Yuri. Upon finding out from Hund that Derrida is still alive and currently in Bruque, Schmidt explains to Yuri that he wants Derrida to peacefully give up the patch that would fix the bug in the haywire DZs. With no luck finding Yuri, Derrida is later informed by Vidaux that Yuri is being held hostage by Schmidt. The next day, Schmidt approaches Derrida at a café, demanding Derrida to bring Vidaux with him to a barricaded bridge unarmed at night and relinquish the patch in exchange for returning Yuri. At the scheduled time, Derrida and Vidaux meet with Schmidt, Hund and Katze at the bridge. Preparing to hand over an empty memory card, Derrida urges Schmidt to make an official record of the exchange, signaling Mayuka to throw a smoke bomb from a distance as a distraction. After Yuri is rescued, Klaus has finished repairing Graham. Derrida, Yuri, Vidaux and Mayuka flee from being pursued by Hund and Katze piloting Canopies. Despite Schmidt detonating the bridge, Graham can now transform into a hovercraft. Meanwhile, Mage tells Cassiel that she is about to do something that Derrida would be against.
8	"The Fate of Time"; Transliteration: "Toki no Sadame" (Japanese: 時のさだめ)	November 21, 2018
In a desert, Derrida, Yuri, Vidaux and Mayuka escape from a trap set by Donna, thanks to a scrambled voice heard from Vidaux's radio transmitter. They stay overnight at a hotel in Garbond, knowing that Donna will not strike in crowded places. Derrida realizes that the scrambled voice belongs to Cassiel, who advices the four to leave town at dawn. When they are chased by Donna on the highway, Cassiel arrives in a cloaking semi-trailer truck and disables Donna's prosthetic right arm with an electromagnetic device called an anti-pulse generator before escorting the four to safety. Cassiel explains that he intended to notify Derrida of his involvement in carrying out Andrei's scheme. At his hideout, Cassiel explains that Mage was the one who unlocked Derrida's cryostasis chamber. Suddenly, Donna appears again and inflicts a stab wound on Vidaux in the abdomen. Derrida performs a time ride on the day before Mage's eighth birthday, where Cassiel's scrambled voice warned him about Andrei's scheme, though Derrida's consciousness is unable to take control of his past self. Returning to the present, Derrida uses the anti-pulse generator to subdue Donna before jumping off a cliff into the lake below with Vidaux and Cassiel. As Derrida, Yuri, Vidaux, Mayuka and Cassiel flee in the semi-trailer truck on the highway, they witness a missile test from a distance. Derrida learns from Ange that he cannot perform a time ride to a certain moment in the past more than once after it has already been altered.
9	"Strong Bonds"; Transliteration: "Tsuyoi Kizuna" (Japanese: 強い絆)	November 28, 2018
On the highway, Derrida, Yuri, Vidaux and Mayuka find themselves in pursuit by four cars. Vidaux takes Graham's advice to drive down the mountainside into the forest below. However, Vidaux needs to rest after his stab wound is aggravated by the impact. While watching the fireflies together, Yuri learns about the familial bond that Mayuka has with Vidaux as her adopted father. Derrida and Yuri begin to wonder why Vidaux takes Mayuka with him everywhere despite being in constant danger. Vidaux recalls that he had a falling-out during his time as a police inspector when his wife was killed in a hit-and-run while regulations forbade him from conducting an investigation involving family members. He sought revenge and killed the culprit, who was revealed to be Mayuka's biological father. In the present, several militarized DZs attack Derrida, Yuri, Vidaux and Mayuka in the forest. Vidaux is captured while trying to ward off the DZs, but Mayuka begs Graham to go back, while Derrida manages to rescue Vidaux in time. As Vidaux and Mayuka share a moment together by the river, Derrida and Yuri witness fighter aircraft launching air-to-surface missiles. Derrida is unable to perform a time ride, questioning to himself if his memories are still reliable. Meanwhile, Mage arrives at Yetz Engineering College, Derrida's alma mater, where she asks a professor named Marlene about the Trout Theory.
10	"Those Who Have Let Go"; Transliteration: "Tebanashita Mono" (Japanese: 手放したもの)	December 5, 2018
In 2055, a researcher named Angelica Klein conducted a seventeen-day dialogue experiment in a facility with DZNA-2058 in an attempt to create a DZ with its own personality. However, DZNA-2058 began to mimic Angelica to the point of assuming her identity and referring to her as Donna, a personality transplant donor. This caused Angelica to have a psychotic break, believing that DZNA-2058 has copied her personality and appearance. A struggle ensued as Angelica attacked DZNA-2058 with a dagger. In the present, Donna kills Andrei and his agents, proclaiming that she is not going to let anyone steal her body. Meanwhile, Derrida, Yuri, Vidaux and Mayuka arrive at Yetz Engineering College. Derrida and Yuri learn that Marlene gave Derrida's thesis on the Trout Theory to Mage six months ago. After explaining that she had to abandon her study on DZs which culminated in a terrible tragedy, Marlene reveals that Angelica set fire in the facility after attacking DZNA-2058 with a dagger, but the bodies of Angelica and DZNA-2058 were never recovered. Marlene gives Cassiel's jamming device to Derrida, who then sifts through Nathan's research on time leaping, learning that Mage may be at the Effelsberg Electromagnetic Telescope.
11	"A Quiet Place"; Transliteration: "Shizukana Basho" (Japanese: 静かな場所)	December 12, 2018
Derrida, Yuri, Vidaux and Mayuka arrive near the Effelsberg Electromagnetic Telescope, where Mage is continuing on with the time ride experiment in hopes of restoring the past before the war. Using the jamming device, Derrida, Yuri, Vidaux and Mayuka avoid a horde of militarized DZs and make their way towards the Effelsberg Electromagnetic Telescope. However, Schmidt suddenly arrives piloting a giant Canopy and deploys an army of an advanced form of DZs called Xs, which are resistant to the jamming device. As a last resort, Graham drives into the giant Canopy and self-destructs onboard. Vidaux fends off the DZs and Xs while Derrida, Yuri and Mayuka proceed on ahead. Derrida, Yuri and Mayuka are then attacked by Hund and Katze piloting Canopies with orders to capture Derrida alive. However, Donna injures Hund and Katze before going after Derrida, who then pacifies her by saying that she was a human researcher named Angelica and not a killing machine named Donna. Derrida and Yuri enter the Effelsberg Electromagnetic Telescope while Mayuka decides to go back to Vidaux.
12	"Everything Goes Back to Where it Belongs"; Transliteration: "Subete wa Arubeki Basho e" (Japanese: 総ては在るべき場所へ)	December 19, 2018
In the basement of the Effelsberg Electromagnetic Telescope, Derrida and Yuri enter a room replicating the Bilstein residence, which would trigger vivid memories of Mage's eighth birthday. As Mage lies inside a cryostasis chamber, Derrida and Yuri watch a video of Mage's past self. The time rides that Derrida performed came at the cost of Mage's memories instead of his own due to the pocket watch that Mage left with him, hence the hallucination of Ange. As Schmidt, Hund and Katze stand outside the Effelsberg Electromagnetic Telescope urging Derrida to surrender, Derrida performs his final time ride to the day of Mage's eighth birthday after declining to help Nathan in his research of time leaping. Derrida apologizes to the eight-year-old Mage and gives his support towards her research in good faith. As a result, Mage gave the access key for the patch to Nathan before he was later tipped off by Cassiel's scrambled voice about Andrei's scheme, which was exposed to the public and was led to Andrei's arrest. Before disappearing, Ange informs Derrida that Mage overwrote the reality of Derrida's death, stating that the future is not a result of what you do but what you hope for. Derrida, Mage, Yuri, Vidaux, Mayuka, Graham, Donna, Nathan and Jacques are seen living peacefully in a new world.
