= Clockwork Planet =

Japanese light novel series

- First light novel volume cover featuring the character RyuZU

クロックワーク・プラネット (Kurokkuwāku Puranetto)
- Genre: Action, clockpunk, fantasy
- Light novel
- Written by: Yuu Kamiya; Tsubaki Himana
- Illustrated by: Shino
- Published by: Kodansha
- English publisher: NA: Seven Seas Entertainment J-Novel Club (digital)
- Imprint: Kodansha Ranobe Bunko
- Original run: April 2, 2013 – December 29, 2015 (on hiatus)
- Volumes: 4
- Manga
- Written by: Yuu Kamiya; Tsubaki Himana
- Illustrated by: Kuro
- Published by: Kodansha
- English publisher: NA: Kodansha USA
- Magazine: Monthly Shōnen Sirius
- Original run: September 26, 2013 – August 25, 2018
- Volumes: 10
- Anime television series
- Directed by: Tsuyoshi Nagasawa
- Produced by: Junichiro Tanaka; Kei Fukura; Shin Furukawa; Gouta Aijima; Takatoshi Chino; Atsushi Aitani
- Written by: Kenji Sugihara
- Music by: Shū Kanematsu; Hanae Nakamura; Kaori Nakano; Satoshi Hōno
- Studio: Xebec
- Licensed by: NA: Crunchyroll Funimation
- Original network: TBS, BS-TBS
- Original run: April 6, 2017 – June 22, 2017
- Episodes: 12
- icon

Clockwork Planet (クロックワーク・プラネット, Kurokkuwāku Puranetto) is a Japanese light novel series, written by Yuu Kamiya and Tsubaki Himana, and illustrated by Shino. Kodansha has published four volumes since April 2, 2013, under their Kodansha Ranobe Bunko imprint. The story is set in a clockpunk fantasy version of the world, in which the entire planet is run by clockwork. The main characters are five people (a machine otaku, two automata, a young technician and a bodyguard) who, after a month of meeting, become the world's most infamous terrorists.

A manga adaptation illustrated by Kuro was serialized in Kodansha's shōnen manga magazine Monthly Shōnen Sirius since 2013 and ended in August 2018. It has been collected in ten tankōbon volumes. An anime television series adaptation by Xebec aired from April 6 to June 22, 2017.

== Plot ==
At an unspecified point in time, Earth collapses. Despite almost inevitable humankind would perish, a genius engineer known only as "Y" manages to rebuild Earth entirely with gears and clockwork mechanisms, renaming it "Clockwork Planet". One thousand years later, original cities of Earth's countries are flourishing inside the planet's surface gears. Naoto Miura, a high school student living in Grid: Kyoto who is in love with mechanics, is dragged into a world crisis when a mechanical crate crashes into his apartment. There, he meets RyuZU, a broken automaton who is the Initial-Y Series, a series of automaton created personally by Y himself. Using his superior hearing, Naoto fixes her in three hours despite RyuZU having been broken for 206 years with no one was able to revive her. Promising loyalty to him, the two are eventually found out by Dr. Marie Bell Breguet, a princess of a noble family and the youngest person to become a master engineer in an international separate government organization "Meister Guild", and her automaton bodyguard Vainney Halter. With the faulty Core Tower, a central tower in every Grid city controls its gear functions, Naoto pinpoints the problem with his sense of hearing alone in ten minutes, fixing it along with other engineers of the Meister Guild and thwarting the government's attempts to purge the city and destroy lives. As the government's illegal technological experimentation is still at large, the pairs join forces to carry out justice and prevent further purges. A month after their encounter, all four appear in Akihabara, Tokyo, having become the world's most infamous terrorists in their quest.

== Characters ==
=== Main ===
Naoto Miura (見浦ナオト, Miura Naoto)
Voiced by: Yoshino Nanjō (Japanese); Dallas Reid (English)
Naoto is a high school student and a machine otaku. He has a hearing ability better than other people, which is why he wears headphones with a noise-canceling ability. Naoto is not interested in human girls, but he is romantically attracted to RyuZU, who is an automaton.
RyuZU (リューズ, Ryūzu)
Voiced by: Ai Kakuma (Japanese); Jeannie Tirado (English)
RyuZU is an automaton that "Y" left behind. She is Unit 1 of the "Initial-Y Series" and was manufactured about 1,000 years ago, but was broken 206 years ago and has been in a non-functional state ever since. After Naoto repaired the failure inside her which nobody could fix, she treats him like her own master. Contrary to her beautiful appearance, RyuZU is incredibly sharp-tongued. Her supreme command is "One Who Follows" ("Yourslave") (付き従うもの(ユアスレイブ), Tsukishitagau mono (Yuasureibu))
Marie Bell Breguet (マリー・ベル・ブレゲ, Marī Beru Burege)
Voiced by: Saori Ōnishi (Japanese); Skyler McIntosh (English)
Marie is the youngest president of Breguet company and a first-class clock technician. She is a self confident genius girl with a sharp mouth. After she and Naoto stopped the Kyoto purge, she faked her own death and decided to keeping the clockwork in the planet safe.
Vainney Halter (ヴァイネイ・ハルター, Vai'nei Harutā)
Voiced by: Kenichirou Matsuda (Japanese); Christopher Sabat (English)
Vainney is Marie's bodyguard and a former soldier. He specializes in fighting with a mechanized body of latest technology. He has been with and supported Marie for a long time.
AnchoR (アンクル, Ankuru)
Voiced by: Sayaka Senbongi (Japanese); Monica Rial (English)
AnchoR is another automaton part of the "Initial-Y Series" which is listed as Unit 4, and she is RyuZU's "younger sister". She was the only automaton manufactured as a weapon among the "Initial-Y Series", giving her the strongest combat ability. Her supreme command is "One Who Annihilates" ("Trishula") (撃滅するもの(トリーシュラ), Gekimetsusuru mono (Torīshura)) and her special mode is Bloody Murder.

=== Others ===
Y
Y is a genius engineer who is said to have rebuilt the entire functions on Earth with gears. Additionally, He created a series of automatons called "Initial-Y Series" (Initial-Yシリーズ), but the blueprints of his creations have long been lost.

== Media ==
=== Light novels ===
The first light novel volume was published on April 2, 2013, by Kodansha under their Kodansha Ranobe Bunko imprint. As of December 29, 2015, four volumes have been published. North American online light novel publisher J-Novel Club have licensed the light novel. Seven Seas Entertainment has licensed the light novels in North America for print.

No.	Original release date	Original ISBN	English release date	English ISBN
1	April 2, 2013	978-4-06-375293-9	February 27, 2018	978-1-62-692755-1
2	November 29, 2013	978-4-06-375348-6	June 26, 2018	978-1-62-692817-6
3	October 31, 2014	978-4-06-381415-6	November 27, 2018	978-1-62-692936-4
4	December 29, 2015	978-4-06-381508-5	April 2, 2019	978-1-64-275002-7

=== Manga ===
No.	Original release date	Original ISBN	English release date	English ISBN
1	February 7, 2014	978-4-06-376445-1	March 21, 2017	978-1-63-236447-0
2	October 31, 2014	978-4-06-376487-1	May 16, 2017	978-1-63-236448-7
3	March 9, 2015	978-4-06-376529-8	June 27, 2017	978-1-63-236449-4
4	September 9, 2015	978-4-06-376571-7	August 22, 2017	978-1-63-236450-0
5	March 9, 2016	978-4-06-390611-0	October 10, 2017	978-1-63-236466-1
6	January 6, 2017	978-4-06-390674-5	December 12, 2017	978-1-63-236467-8
7	April 7, 2017	978-4-06-390694-3	February 27, 2018	978-1-63-236542-2
8	September 8, 2017	978-4-06-390729-2	July 31, 2018	978-1-63-236620-7
9	March 9, 2018	978-4-06-511021-8	December 24, 2018	978-1-63-236660-3
10	October 9, 2018	978-4-06-513057-5	February 26, 2019	978-1-63-236720-4

=== Anime ===
An anime adaptation of the light novel series was announced in December 2015, which was later confirmed to be an anime television series adaptation in December 2016. The series was directed by Tsuyoshi Nagasawa and written by Kenji Sugihara, with animation by Xebec, character designs by Shuichi Shimamura and mechanical designs by Kenji Teraoka. The music was composed by Shū Kanematsu, Hanae Nakamura, Kaori Nakano and Satoshi Hōno. The opening theme titled "Clockwork Planet" is sung by fripSide, while the ending theme titled "Anti Clockwise" (アンチクロックワイズ, Anchikurokkuwaizu) is sung by After The Rain. It aired from April 6 to June 22, 2017, on TBS and BS-TBS Crunchyroll licensed and streamed the series, and Funimation dubbed the series and released it on home video in North America. The series ran for 12 episodes.

No.	Title	Original release date
1	"Gear of Destiny"; Transliteration: "Gia obu Desutinī" (Japanese: 運命の歯車(ギア・オブ・デスティニー))	April 6, 2017
After the Earth naturally reached the end of its life, it was rebuilt by a skilled Clocksmith known only as Y and renamed the Clockwork Planet. A thousand years later, a Breguet Company airship mistakenly drops a box into the heart of Kyoto. Marie Bell Breguet, the company heiress, sends teams to find the box containing an inactive female automaton personally built by Y and considered a national treasure. The box lands in the home of high school student Naoto Miura, a clockwork enthusiast with unusually sensitive hearing. Despite having no Clocksmith training, he manages to hear exactly which gear is causing the malfunction and repairs it, reactivating the automaton, who immediately saves him when his damaged home collapses. She introduces herself as RyuZU, Unit 1 of the Initial Y Series, who has been malfunctioning for 206 years. Grateful to Naoto for repairing her and impressed by his exceptional hearing, RyuZU registers him as her master. Elsewhere, Marie and a team of Clocksmiths begin investigating a malfunction within the gears of Kyoto which will spread and lead to Kyoto being forcibly purged by the military to stop the malfunction spreading to the rest of the planet.
2	"Purge"; Transliteration: "Pāji" (Japanese: 大支柱崩落(パージ))	April 13, 2017
Marie discovers the military plans on purging Kyoto by killing its twenty million inhabitants in order to save their reputation rather than admitting to the public there is an irreparable malfunction. After interrogating a soldier, Marie learns the malfunction is somewhere on Floor 24 beneath the central tower of Kyoto. Elsewhere, Naoto continues hearing noises from beneath Kyoto and determines the malfunction is coming from the Floor 24 by using his enhanced hearing. With help from her automaton bodyguard, Vainney Halter, Marie fights her way past military automata to reach Floor 24. RyuZU transfers into Naoto's school and declares herself as Naoto's property, earning jealousy from his classmates. On Floor 24, Marie and her team begin searching for the malfunction, but are ordered to retreat by the Meister Guild. Marie learns Limons Vacheron, a guild officer and business rival of Marie's family, is conspiring with the military's attempt to purge Kyoto in order to discredit the Breguet Company to further his own family interest, the Vacheron Company. Marie goes against orders and swears to repair the malfunction. On the street, Marie crosses paths with Naoto and realizes RyuZU has been repaired.
3	"Conflict"; Transliteration: "Konfurikuto" (Japanese: 真正面突破(コンフリクト))	April 20, 2017
Marie explains Kyoto will be purged in seven hours, believing RyuZU was designed by Y to maintain the planet's gears. However, RyuZU explains her official designation is "One Who Follows", built solely to obey orders given to her by her master. After Naoto hears an incoming gravity anomaly, Marie is shocked by his enhanced hearing and sensing the malfunction on Floor 24. Once RyuZU reveals her younger sister is stored beneath the central tower of Kyoto, Naoto agrees to help. Limons orders the military to capture Marie so she can be blamed for the purge. Marie tricks Limons into believing she was killed and obtains a recording of him admitting to conspiring with the military. While fighting their way to Floor 24, RyuZU activates her unique ability, Dual Time, in which she enters a slower alternate timeline, destroys the military automata, then returns to the normal timeline, imperceptibly taking place for just a moment. Naoto impulsively asks RyuZU to marry him, but she declines and has free will unlike other automata, confirming she loves Naoto without having been given the order to do so.
4	"Imaginary Gear"; Transliteration: "Imajinarī Gia" (Japanese: 虚数運動機関(イマジナリー・ギア))	April 27, 2017
Having reached Floor 24, Naoto and the others join Marie's team, who refuse to evacuate to save themselves. Marie explains to Naoto is the only one who can save Kyoto using his enhanced hearing. Naoto removes his noise-cancelling headphones, extending the range of his hearing even further, and within seconds he locates over four thousand malfunctions, eighteen of which are responsible for the gravity fluctuations. Following his directions, they manage to repair all eighteen. Before they can celebrate, Limons begins the purge and Kyoto begins to sink. Marie plans to stop the purge by using RyuZU's Dual Time mechanism. Naoto refuses to risk damaging RyuZU, but she removes her own heart to prevent Naoto from dying in the purge. With RyuZU's heart generating anti-gravity, Kyoto begins to rise back to the surface. Limons sends military automata to stop them, but they are instead destroyed by Halter. Kyoto is returned to the surface with seconds to spare, and Naoto desperately removes RyuZU's heart from the gravity generator before it can rip itself apart, seriously injuring himself. Naoto and Marie replace RyuZU's heart, and RyuZU tearfully reunites with Naoto upon awakening.
5	"Trishula"; Transliteration: "Torīshura" (Japanese: 撃滅するもの(トリーシュラ))	May 4, 2017
A funeral is held with Marie presumed dead, while Limons is fired. Marie, posing as Halter's sister, renames herself Marie Belle Halter and plans to save the planet from government corruption. Three advanced automata discover an enormous automaton beneath Kyoto, but are destroyed by RyuZU's sister, AnchoR, Unit 4 of the Initial Y Series, "One Who Annihilates", an ultimate weapon automaton. Marie and Halter intercept an illegal radio transmission. All uses of electromagnetism, which prevents gears from functioning, have been banned for one thousand years. Marie tracks it to Kyoto's industrial sector near a beach. At the beach, RyuZU and Naoto almost kiss, but Naoto falls into the ocean. RyuZU argues with Marie, who stops her from giving Naoto the kiss of life and instead slaps him awake. The industrial sector is revealed to be nonfunctional, hence the use of radio as the only means of communication. Naoto and RyuZU realize AnchoR must be beneath them. They find the enormous automaton, which runs on illegal electromagnetism and was built using gears from the industrial sector, explaining why the sector is nonfunctional. AnchoR appears, having been reprogrammed to protect the automaton, and attacks them with her unique ability, Bloody Murder.
6	"Deep Underground"; Transliteration: "Dīpu Andāguraundo" (Japanese: 大深度地下層(ディープ・アンダーグラウンド))	May 11, 2017
They manage to evade Bloody Murder, a clockwork ball which can grind its way through steel. Naoto hears AnchoR's gears functioning incorrectly, revealing AnchoR is being forced to guard the automaton. During the battle, Naoto and RyuZU fall into the deep underground, which has an atmosphere like outer space. With Naoto dead and RyuZU lost forever, Halter retreats with Marie, who ultimately decides to finish her mission for Naoto. They interrogate the governor of the Mie Grid and learn the enormous automaton was constructed by scientists from the Shiga Grid after the area malfunctioned due to their illegal electromagnetism research and was purged by the government to conceal it. Marie learns the government, eager to save their reputation after she exposed their part in the attempted purge of Kyoto, has activated the automaton and plans to destroy it in public. Marie becomes emotionally overwhelmed with her failures and is on the verge of quitting, until Naoto and RyuZU suddenly emerge from a sewer, having been returned to the surface, thanks to an aged Shiga scientist. They head to Tokyo together to save AnchoR and stop the automaton from clashing with the military.
7	"Attack the Multiple Grid"; Transliteration: "Atakku tu Maruchipuru Guriddo" (Japanese: 首都襲撃(アタック・トゥ・マルチプルグリッド))	May 18, 2017
In the Akihabara Grid, Naoto sets off explosions around the city to drive the citizens away from the area, while the military prepares to fight the approaching automaton in the deep underground. RyuZU activates Dual Time to fight AnchoR in an alternate timeline, only to be outmatched since AnchoR was designed for combat. In a flashback, Naoto realized AnchoR can only attack other automata instead of humans. RyuZU uses Marie as a stationary shield frozen in the original timeline, forcing AnchoR to grind her gears to a halt upon approaching Marie. RyuZU destroys the mask controlling AnchoR and returns them both to the original timeline, where the battle between the military and automaton is almost over. AnchoR awakes at Marie's safe house, having been fully repaired, and greets Naoto, Marie and RyuZU as her father, mother and big sister, respectively. After AnchoR registers Naoto as her master, his first and only order is for her to unlock the gear restraining her free will. She cries tears of joy after realizing she can never be ordered to destroy anything ever again.
8	"Yatsukahagi"; Transliteration: "Yatsukahagi" (Japanese: 電磁式機動兵器八束脛(ヤツカハギ))	May 25, 2017
AnchoR's Bloody Murder ejects the head of Vermouth, one of the advanced automata she previously destroyed, and Marie repairs him enough so he can speak. The military fails to destroy the automaton, which is named Yatsukahagi. It detonates a magnetic explosion causing every gear in the Akihabara Grid to stop working, including the gears inside RyuZU, AnchoR and Halter, who all malfunction and shut down. The military orders Yatsugahagi to be destroyed with their Capital Defense Cannon, but Yatsukahagi defends itself with an electromagnetic shield before destroying the cannon. A flashback reveals the aged Shiga scientist, who is named Gennai Hirayama, is also the lead scientist controlling Yatsukahagi and has an ulterior motive. Naoto and Marie realize every piece of metal in the Akihabara Grid have been magnetized. As RyuZU starts to overheat, Naoto moves her away from light to help her cool down, despite his hands severely burned in the process. AnchoR awakens, she realizes she has a built-in demagnetizing mechanism which heats her to Curie temperature, a sufficient cooling system which RyuZU does not possess. Marie finds herself admiring Naoto's unwillingness to give up in what he believes.
9	"Criminal Act"; Transliteration: "Kuriminaru Akuto" (Japanese: 空前絶後の犯罪(クリミナル・アクト))	June 1, 2017
In the Ueno Grid, Marie asks Meister Conrad for help repairing RyuZU and Halter. After placing Vermouth's brain in the body of a sex robot, Marie learns Yatsukahagi, which requires sixty-six and a half hours to recharge, is being used to cause a conflict between the government and military. The government decides to use a satellite named Tall Wand to drop a bomb on Yatsukahagi, destroying it along with the Akihabara Grid. While Naoto spends time with AnchoR at the mall, Marie later demands Anchor to destroy Yatsukagi. Naoto collapses as he is unable to block out the noise, since his headphones were previously destroyed. However, he remains determined to punish those who hurt RyuZU and argues with Marie for treating AnchoR like a weapon instead of a child. Marie apologizes and begins repairing RyuZU, later realizing Naoto knows very little about clocks-smithing and instead relies on his instinctual hearing. With his new headphones purchased, Naoto plans to seize the Pillar of Heaven at the center of Japan, find a new body for Halter, thwart the plans of the military government to save the Clockwork Planet. Vermouth decides to help them as he thinks this will be entertaining.
10	"Progressor"; Transliteration: "Puroguressā" (Japanese: 自動人形を繋ぐもの(プログレッサー))	June 8, 2017
RyuZU, AnchoR and Vermouth battle the military at the Pillar of Heaven in the Sakuradamon Grid to reach a suitable automaton to be Halter's new body. After Marie installs Halter's brain, they destroy the remaining enemies and claim the Pillar of Heaven, which controls Tokyo's clockworks, and also capture Princess Houka Hoshinomiya, Marie's friend who supports their efforts to save Tokyo. By playing the role of hostage in Naoto's fake terrorist plot to purge Tokyo, Houka manages to scare the citizens into evacuating to prevent them from being killed by Tall Wand. Marie reveals their plan to use the Pillar of Heaven in order to heat the Akihabara Grid to Curie temperature and reverse the electromagnetism. Houka wonders whether Naoto's abilities might make him dangerous enough to one day require his imprisonment but reconsiders after being threatened by RyuZU and AnchoR. RyuZU blames herself for burning Naoto's hands during her malfunction and requests to be punished. Naoto asks RyuZU to wear a handmade wedding ring, and they both happily vow to stay together forever.
11	"Theory of Y"; Transliteration: "Seorī obu Y" (Japanese: 天才の理論(セオリー・オブ・Y))	June 15, 2017
Inside Yatsukahagi, Gennai executes his crew in betrayal and begins his true plan to destroy Y. Gennai fires an electromagnetic burst directly at the Pillar of Heaven and damages it, even though Naoto attempted to protect it by having Marie use the weather control clockwork to form rain clouds. He then directly contacts Naoto, who is questioned of how Clockwork Planet functions. The government activates Tall Wand, but it is destroyed instantly by Yatsukahagi, as Gennai accuses Naoto of being Y and swears to kill him. With Naoto still unwilling to order AnchoR to destroy Yatsukahagi, AnchoR decides to leave on her own free will. Naoto and Marie confront each other, both jealous of each other's skills, as they eventually realize their skills complement each other when they work together. With their combined efforts, Naoto and Marie begin to build a better version of the Pillar of Heaven. After failing to convince AnchoR not to fight, RyuZU makes AnchoR promise to return home no matter what happens. AnchoR tearfully activates her combat mode, Steel Weight, as she prepares for battle.
12	"Steel Weight"; Transliteration: "Sutīru Weito" (Japanese: 終焉機動(スティール・ウェイト))	June 22, 2017
AnchoR blasts her way inside Yatsukahagi while Naoto and Marie continue rebuilding. The military manages to damage the Pillar of Heaven further, forcing Naoto and Marie to rebuild and repair simultaneously. Gennai becomes convinced Y was actually two people, Naoto and Marie. However, Gennai is unable to fire Yatsukahagi's weapon, as AnchoR destroys several generators while severely damaging her body. Before she can completely destroy the engine, she is shot by Gennai with a railgun. AnchoR is saved by RyuZU, who severs Gennai's hand. Yatsukahagi begins to fall apart as Naoto and Marie finish rebuilding the Pillar of Heaven. Houka agrees to Marie's request to label her and Naoto as the most dangerous terrorists on the planet, before they flee with Halter and Vermouth. RyuZU retrieves AnchoR and leaves Gennai to die as Yatsukahagi explodes. Two weeks later on a boat in the South China Sea, Halter has his brain returned to his original body, AnchoR is repaired enough to move on her own, Naoto and Marie continue their arguments and Vermouth spots a fleet of battleships nearby. They all prepare their attack on the fleet.
