= The Legend of the Legendary Heroes =

Japanese light novel series and its franchise

- Cover of The Legend of the Legendary Heroes first volume as published by Fujimi Shobo

伝説の勇者の伝説 (Densetsu no Yūsha no Densetsu)
- Light novel
- Written by: Takaya Kagami
- Illustrated by: Saori Toyota
- Published by: Fujimi Shobo
- Imprint: Fujimi Fantasia Bunko
- Magazine: Dragon Magazine
- Original run: February 20, 2002 – October 20, 2006
- Volumes: 11
- Manga

Nantonaku Densetsu no Yūsha no Densetsu
- Written by: Takaya Kagami
- Illustrated by: Saori Toyota
- Published by: Fujimi Shobo
- Magazine: Dragon Magazine
- Original run: October 15, 2002 – January 20, 2009
- Volumes: 1
- Light novel

The Legend of the Legendary Heroes Anyway
- Written by: Takaya Kagami
- Illustrated by: Saori Toyota
- Published by: Fujimi Shobo
- Magazine: Dragon Magazine
- Original run: December 20, 2002 – June 20, 2007
- Volumes: 11
- Light novel

The Legend of the Great Legendary Heroes
- Written by: Takaya Kagami
- Illustrated by: Saori Toyota
- Published by: Fujimi Shobo
- Magazine: Dragon Magazine
- Original run: October 20, 2007 – May 20, 2025
- Volumes: 18
- Light novel

The Legend of the Black Fallen Hero
- Written by: Takaya Kagami
- Illustrated by: Saori Toyota
- Published by: Fujimi Shobo
- Magazine: Dragon Magazine
- Original run: December 20, 2007 – August 20, 2013
- Volumes: 8
- Manga
- Written by: Takaya Kagami
- Illustrated by: Hiroko Chōzō
- Published by: Fujimi Shobo
- Magazine: Monthly Dragon Age
- Original run: July 9, 2008 – April 9, 2012
- Volumes: 9
- Manga

Gakuen Denyūden
- Written by: Takaya Kagami
- Illustrated by: S.Kosugi
- Published by: Fujimi Shobo
- Magazine: Monthly Dragon Age; Dragon Magazine
- Original run: June 9, 2010 – December 9, 2010
- Anime television series
- Directed by: Itsuro Kawasaki
- Produced by: Tomoko Kawasaki; Takashi Tachizaki; Masazumi Katō; Jeong Hyun-ah; Yoshiyuki Itō; Masahito Arinaga
- Written by: Kiyoko Yoshimura
- Music by: Miyu Nakamura
- Studio: Zexcs
- Licensed by: NA: Funimation
- Original network: TV Tokyo
- Original run: July 1, 2010 – December 16, 2010
- Episodes: 24
- Manga

Shin Denyūden Kakumei-hen Ochita Kuroi Yūsha no Densetsu
- Written by: Takaya Kagami
- Illustrated by: Riya Hozumi
- Published by: Square Enix
- Magazine: Gangan Online
- Original run: July 29, 2010 – April 26, 2012
- Volumes: 4
- Manga

Densetsu no Yūsha no Densetsu Revision
- Written by: Takaya Kagami
- Illustrated by: Taisei Yamachi
- Published by: Square Enix
- Magazine: Young Gangan
- Original run: October 15, 2010 – August 5, 2011
- Volumes: 2
- icon

The Legend of the Legendary Heroes (Japanese: 伝説の勇者の伝説, Hepburn: Densetsu no Yūsha no Densetsu) is a Japanese light novel series by Takaya Kagami, with illustrations by Saori Toyota, which was published by Fujimi Shobo in Dragon Magazine from February 20, 2002, to October 20, 2006, and has 11 volumes. Its sequel, The Legend of the Great Legendary Heroes (大伝説の勇者の伝説, Dai Densetsu no Yūsha no Densetsu) was published in 18 volumes from October 20, 2007, to May 20, 2025. There are also two spin-off series, The Legend of Legendary Heroes Anyway (とりあえず伝説の勇者の伝説, Toriaezu Densetsu no Yūsha no Densetsu), a collection of short stories which ran from December 20, 2002, to June 20, 2007, and was compiled into 11 volumes, and The Legend of the Black Fallen Hero (堕ちた黒い勇者の伝説, Ochita Kuroi Yūsha no Densetsu), which ran from December 20, 2007, to August 20, 2013, and was published in 8 volumes.

The series has also spun off into other media including a Drama CD, a manga adaptation which is collected into nine bound volumes, along with other manga spinoffs and a PSP video game which was released on February 18, 2010. A 24-episode anime adaptation directed by Itsuro Kawasaki aired in 2010 and is licensed by Kadokawa in Japan and Funimation Entertainment in North America.

== Story ==
Ryner Lute is a lazy student of the Roland Empire Royal Magician's Academy. One day, the Roland Empire goes to war against their neighboring country Estabul, and Ryner loses his classmates in the war. After the war, Ryner sets out on a journey to search for the relics of a "Legendary Hero" at King Sion Astal's command and finds out that a deadly curse is spreading throughout the continent.

== Characters ==
=== Main characters ===
Ryner Lute (ライナ・リュート, Raina Ryūto)
Voiced by: Jun Fukuyama (Japanese); Ian Sinclair (English)
The protagonist of the story. Ryner possesses Alpha Stigma (複写眼 (アルファ・スティグマ), Arufa Sutiguma), an ocular ability which allows him to analyze various forms of magic. Through this, he has learned how to utilize numerous styles of magic through battle, and become a particularly strong mage. This is unusual, as often Alpha Stigma users are killed at a young age after their power causes them to go berserk. However, due to his father implanting a legendary demon lord's essence into him, Ryner has partially negated his berserk tendencies. Later in the story, Ryner is nearly killed in battle, but awakens as "The Solver of All Formulas" (すべての式を解く者, Subete no Shiki o Tokumono) which grants him incredible omniperceptive abilities.
Ferris Eris (フェリス・エリス, Ferisu Erisu)
Voiced by: Ayahi Takagaki (Japanese); Luci Christian (English)
A blonde-hair bishōjo with blue eyes who comes from a famous Swords-Clan (剣の一族, Tsurugi no Ichizoku) designated to serve as guards to the King of Roland. Ferris carries a typically emotionless expression, is extremely proud of her own beauty, and enjoys dango. She is assigned by Sion to accompany Ryner on his quest to search for the "Relics of Heroes".
Sion Astal (シオン・アスタール, Shion Asutāru)
Voiced by: Daisuke Ono (Japanese); Eric Vale (English)
Son of the previous king and a lowly commoner, Sion is the current king of the nation of Roland. Because of his lowly birth, he was shunned and hated by his half brothers. He vowed at a young age to become king so he can fix this corrupted world. Sion is widely known as a tactical genius, and is willing to sacrifice for the greater good, something about which he is greatly conflicted. He is initially a friend to Ryner, but later opposes him.
Lucile Eris (ルシル・エリス, Rushiru Erisu)
Voiced by: Tomokazu Sugita (Japanese); Jerry Jewell (English)
A cold, calm and reserved man, Lucile is the Head son of the Eris Swords-Clan, a position which he inherited after killing his own parents in order to save Ferris from being raped by their father. Lucile's real name is Relx Eris (レルクス・エリス, Rerukusu Erisu). He has absorbed the other half of the legendary demon's essence, thus becoming Lucile Eris, "The Weaver of All Formulas (すべての式を編む者, Subete no Shiki o Amu Mono)", granting him godlike powers and invincibility. However, Lucile regards this power as a curse.
Riphal Edia (レファル・エディア, Refaru Edia)
Voiced by: Kazuya Nakai (Japanese); Patrick Seitz (English)
He is the ruler of the Gastark Empire and a powerful warrior. He is named after the First Ancestor of Edia family, who was the first owner of the Rule Fragment Glouvil. His father told him the story of making of Glouvil and made Riphal promise to never touch the sword.
Enne Lune (エーネ・ルネ, Ēne Rune)
Leader of the God's Eyes Group, Enne has the body of a young girl, but is really of unknown age. The bearer of Torch Curse (未来眼, トーチ・カース, Tōchi Kāsu), when her powers became active, her body was cursed to stop growing. Invoking her eyes causes red-colored flying birds to appear over her eyes and allow her to see accurately into the future.
Vois Feurel (ヴォイス・フューレル, Voisu Fūreru)
Vois is the Supreme Commander of the Anti-Roland Coalition, and appears to be under the influence of the Goddesses. He possesses four pieces of the "Derunio (Death Displacement Stone) (死の転移 デルニオ?, Derunio) Rule Fragment, which can be used to heal even the gravest of injuries.
Pia Vaaliey (ピア・ヴァーリエ, Pia Vārie)
Pia is the Queen of the Azure Princess Mercenary Group, which is employed to crush small countries in Central Menoris. Currently, she is allied with the Anti-Roland Coalition with a common goal of defeating the Mad Hero. Sees herself as an older sister to Ryner and the rest.

=== Minor characters ===
Milk Callaud (ミルク・カラード, Miruku Karādo)
Voiced by: Saki Fujita (Japanese); Jamie Marchi (English)
Claugh Klom (クラウ・クロム, Kurau Kuromu)
Voiced by: Atsushi Imaruoka (Japanese); Mike McFarland (English)
Calne Kaiwal (カルネ・カイウェル, Karune Kaiweru)
Voiced by: Miyuki Sawashiro (Japanese); Chris Burnett (English)
Miran Froaude (ミラン・フロワード, Milan Furowado)
Voiced by: Junichi Suwabe (Japanese); J. Michael Tatum (English)
Noa Ehn (ノア・エン, Noa En)
Voiced by: Mikako Takahashi (Japanese); Colleen Clinkenbeard (English)
Rahel Miller (ラッヘル・ミラー, Rahheru Mirā)
Voiced by: Yasunori Masutani (Japanese); Christopher Sabat (English)
Fiole Folkal (フィオル・フォークル, Fioru Fōkuru)
Voiced by: Miyu Irino (Japanese); Greg Ayres (English)
Eslina Folkal (エスリナ・フォークル, Esurina Fōkuru)
Voiced by: Ayana Taketatsu (Japanese); Alexis Tipton (English)
Lir Orla (リル・オルラ, Riru Orura)
Voiced by: Anri Katsu (Japanese); Newton Pittman (English)
Sui Orla (スイ・オルラ, Sui Orura)
Voiced by: Takuma Terashima (Japanese); John Burgmeier (English)
Kuu Orla (クゥ・オルラ, Ku Orura)
Voiced by: Mariya Ise (Japanese); Cherami Leigh (English)
Tiir Rumibul (ティール・ルミブル, Tīru Rumiburu)
Voiced by: Takahiro Sakurai (Japanese); Robert McCollum (English)
Kiefer Knolles (キファ・ノールズ, Kifa Nōruzu)
Voiced by: Fuyuka Oura (Japanese); Brina Palencia (English)
Toale Nelphi (トアレ・ネルフィ, Toare Nerufi)
Voiced by: Yūto Suzuki (Japanese); Todd Haberkorn (English)
Iris Eris (イリス・エリス, Irisu Erisu)
Voiced by: Tomosa Murata (Japanese); Monica Rial (English)

== Media ==
=== Light novels ===
==== The Legend of the Legendary Heroes ====
No.	Release date	ISBN
1	February 20, 2002	978-4-8291-1410-0
2	June 20, 2002	978-4-8291-1439-1
3	May 20, 2003	978-4-8291-1518-3
4	October 18, 2003	978-4-8291-1564-0
5	April 20, 2004	978-4-8291-1606-7
6	August 20, 2004	978-4-8291-1640-1
7	October 20, 2004	978-4-8291-1661-6
8	June 20, 2005	978-4-8291-1729-3
9	October 20, 2005	978-4-8291-1768-2
10	April 20, 2006	978-4-8291-1817-7
11	October 20, 2006	978-4-8291-1870-2

==== The Legend of the Legendary Heroes Anyway ====
No.	Release date	ISBN
1	December 20, 2002	978-4-8291-1483-4
2	June 20, 2003	978-4-8291-1530-5
3	December 20, 2003	978-4-8291-1576-3
4	June 19, 2004	978-4-8291-1625-8
5	December 18, 2004	978-4-8291-1676-0
6	August 20, 2005	978-4-8291-1746-0
7	March 18, 2006	978-4-8291-1809-2
8	August 19, 2006	978-4-8291-1854-2
9	January 20, 2007	978-4-8291-1890-0
10	March 20, 2007	978-4-8291-1913-6
11	June 20, 2007	978-4-8291-1939-6

==== The Legend of the Great Legendary Heroes ====
No.	Release date	ISBN
1	October 20, 2007	978-4-8291-1966-2
2	November 20, 2007	978-4-8291-1981-5
3	May 20, 2008	978-4-8291-3292-0
4	September 20, 2008	978-4-8291-3327-9
5	February 20, 2009	978-4-8291-3376-7
6	August 20, 2009	978-4-8291-3429-0
7	January 20, 2010	978-4-8291-3479-5
8	June 19, 2010	978-4-8291-3530-3
9	December 18, 2010	978-4-8291-3594-5
10	May 20, 2011	978-4-8291-3638-6
11	February 18, 2012	978-4-8291-3727-7
12	September 20, 2012	978-4-8291-3799-4
13	February 21, 2013	978-4-8291-3857-1
14	October 19, 2013	978-4-0471-2914-6
15	May 20, 2014	978-4-0407-0190-5
16	September 19, 2015	978-4-0407-0357-2
17	October 20, 2017	978-4040-70768-6
18	May 20, 2025	978-4040-72075-3

==== The Legend of the Black Fallen Hero ====
No.	Release date	ISBN
1	December 20, 2007	978-4-8291-1989-1
2	March 19, 2008	978-4-8291-3271-5
3	December 20, 2008	978-4-8291-3360-6
4	April 20, 2009	978-4-8291-3393-4
5	October 20, 2009	978-4-8291-3452-8
6	September 18, 2010	978-4-8291-3563-1
7	June 20, 2012	978-4-8291-3766-6
8	August 20, 2013	978-4-8291-3922-6

=== Manga ===
No.	Release date	ISBN
1	March 9, 2009	978-4-04-712594-0
2	July 9, 2009	978-4-04-712616-9
3	November 9, 2009	978-4-04-712636-7
4	July 9, 2010	978-4-04-712675-6
5	October 9, 2010	978-4-04-712690-9
6	January 8, 2011	978-4-04-712708-1
7	July 7, 2011	978-4-04-712731-9
8	February 9, 2012	978-4-04-712778-4
9	June 6, 2012	978-4-04-712804-0

=== Web radio ===
The web radio show, The Legendary Radio of the Legendary Heroes, was hosted on Onsen Internet Radio Station and Animate TV, and starred Jun Fukuyama, Ayahi Takagaki, and Daisuke Ono acting as their fictional counterpart Ryner Lute, Ferris Eris, and Sion Astal respectively. The first episode aired on May 21, 2010, and last one on December 24, 2010, spanning 32 episodes and sub-divided into 8 chapters. Each chapter is accompanied by a theme and usually, with one or more special guests who are usually either another voice actor from the cast, the anime director or the author of the original series, Kagami Takaya. Summary of each radio show episode can be found on Presepe.

=== Video game ===
Legendary Saga, a PSP game that is based on the first three novels was released on February 18, 2010, in Japan.

=== Anime ===
In January 2010, an anime adaption of the series was announced. The series was adapted into a 24-episode produced by Zexcs and directed by Itsuro Kawasaki, with Miyu Nakamura composing the music, Kiyoko Yoshimura writing the scripts, and Noriko Shimazawa handling animation character designs. The anime started broadcast on TV Tokyo on July 1, followed by TV Osaka, TV Aichi and AT-X. It ended on December 16. The first Blu-ray and DVD of the anime was released on October 22, and the eleventh and last on August 24, 2011.

For episodes 1 to 12, the opening and ending theme singles are "Lament: Joy Soon" (LAMENT～やがて喜びを～"LAMENT ~Yagate Yorokobi wo~") performed by Aira Yuhki, produced by Lantis and released on July 21, 2010, with catalog number LACM-4732, and "Truth Of My Destiny" performed by Ceui, produced by Lantis and released on August 11, 2010, with catalog number LACM-4734, respectively. "Lament: Joy Soon" peak ranked 64th on Oricon singles charts, and was an Oricon "Pick" on their 2010 Anime Theme Songs/Summer editorial. "Truth Of My Destiny" peak ranked 75th on Oricon singles charts.

For episodes 13 to 24, the opening and ending theme singles, are "Last Inferno" performed by Ceui and released on October 27, 2010, and (光のフィルメント) or "Hikari no Firumento" performed by Takagaki Ayahi and released on November 17, respectively.

In English, the series is licensed by Funimation in North America and had a simulcast release. Funimation has also dubbed the series.

== Reception ==
As of January 28, 2011, the light novels have sold over 4,300,000 copies.
