= Miyū =

- Pronunciation: Mí-yú-ú
- Gender: Female

Origin
- Origin: Japanese
- Meaning: It can have many different meanings depending on the kanji used.
- Region of origin: Japanese

Miyū is a feminine Japanese given name.

== Written forms ==
Miyū can be written using different kanji characters and can mean:

- 美夕, "beauty, evening"
- 美遊, "beauty, play"
- 美優, "beauty, tenderness"
- 美憂, "beauty, worry"
- 実優, "fruit, tenderness"; "truth, tenderness"
- 心優, "heart, tenderness"
- 心結, "heart, bind"
- 海優, "sea, tenderness"
- 未優, "sheep, tenderness"
- 未遊, "sheep, play"

The name can also be written in hiragana (みゆう) or katakana (ミユウ).

== People with the name ==
- Miyuu Ariiso (有磯 実結; born 1996), Japanese former idol of the idol group E-girls
- Miyuu Kihara (木原 美悠; born 2004), Japanese table tennis player
- Miyuu Masuhara (増原 海夕; born 2001), Japanese ice hockey goaltender
- Miyū Mizushima (水島 美結; born 2003), Japanese idol of the idol group AKB48
- Miyū Ōishi (大石 美優; born 1997), Japanese former idol of the idol group E-girls
- Miyuu Sawai (沢井 美優; born 1987), Japanese actress, model, and gravure idol
- Miyuu Sugawara (菅原 美優; born 1999), Japanese kickboxer
- Miyū Tsuzurahara (黒葛原 未有; born 1994), Japanese actress
- Miyuu Yamamoto (山本 美憂; born 1974), Japanese former female freestyle wrestler and mixed martial artist
- Miyū Yamashita (山下 美夢有; born 2001), Japanese professional golfer

== Fictional characters ==
- Miyū Shirakawa (美夕), a character in the manga series First Love Sisters
- Miyu Makimura (未有), a character in the manga series Mint na Bokura

== See also ==
- Miyu
