= Takaya Kagami =

Japanese light novel and manga writer (born 1979)

- 鏡 貴也
- Born: May 22, 1979 (age 47)
- Occupations: Light novelist and Manga artist
- Writing career
- Language: Japanese
- Genre: Fantasy
- Notable works: The Legend of the Legendary Heroes, A Dark Rabbit Has Seven Lives, Seraph of the End

Takaya Kagami (鏡 貴也, Kagami Takaya; born May 22, 1979) is a Japanese light novel and manga writer. Some of his major works include The Legend of the Legendary Heroes, A Dark Rabbit Has Seven Lives, and Seraph of the End, which have been adapted into anime series.

== Works ==
- The Legend of the Legendary Heroes
- A Dark Rabbit Has Seven Lives
- Seraph of the End
- Apocalypse Alice
