= List of Full Metal Panic! episodes =

Full Metal Panic! is an anime television series based on the Japanese light novel of the same name written by Shoji Gatoh and illustrated by Shiki Douji. The anime series was produced by Gonzo Digimation and originally aired in 2002 after its original air date was canceled because of the September 11 attacks. The series was licensed by ADV Films for North American release in 2003.

A second season titled Full Metal Panic? Fumoffu aired in August 2003 and a third season, Full Metal Panic! The Second Raid, was announced on October 29, 2004, and was directed by Yasuhiro Takemoto. It aired from July 13, 2005, to October 19, 2005.

A fourth season titled, Full Metal Panic! Invisible Victory, was announced on October 22, 2016, and aired from April 13, 2018, to July 18, 2018.

== Series overview ==
Season	Episodes	Originally released	
Season	Episodes	First released	Last released
1	24	January 8, 2002	June 18, 2002
2	13	July 13, 2005	October 19, 2005
3	12	April 13, 2018	July 18, 2018

== Episode list ==
=== Season 1 (2002) ===
No.	Title	Original release date
1	"The Guy I Kinda Like is a Sergeant"; Transliteration: "Ki ni Naru Aitsu wa Gunsō" (Japanese: 気になるあいつは軍曹)	January 8, 2002
2	"I Want to Protect You"; Transliteration: "Mamotte Agetai" (Japanese: 守ってあげたい)	January 15, 2002
3	"Lingerie Panic"; Transliteration: "Ranjerī Panikku" (Japanese: ランジェリー·パニック)	January 22, 2002
4	"Kidnap"; Transliteration: "Kiddo Nappu" (Japanese: キッド·ナップ)	January 29, 2002
5	"Whispered"; Transliteration: "Sasayakareshi Mono (Wisupādo)" (Japanese: 囁かれし者(ウィスパード))	February 5, 2002
6	"Still Alive"; Transliteration: "STILL ALIVE"	February 12, 2002
7	"Boy Meets Girl"; Transliteration: "Bōi Mītsu Gāru" (Japanese: ボーイ·ミーツ·ガール)	February 19, 2002
8	"Part Time Steady"; Transliteration: "Pātotaimu Sutedi" (Japanese: パートタイム·ステディ)	February 26, 2002
9	"Dangerous Safe House"; Transliteration: "Abunai Sēfu Hausu" (Japanese: あぶないセーフハウス)	March 5, 2002
10	"Run, Running, Ran"; Transliteration: "Ran Ranningu Ran" (Japanese: ラン·ランニング·ラン)	March 12, 2002
11	"Behemoth Awakening"; Transliteration: "Behemosu Kakusei" (Japanese: ベヘモス覚醒)	March 19, 2002
12	"One Night Stand"; Transliteration: "Wan Naito Sutando" (Japanese: ワン·ナイト·スタンド)	March 26, 2002
13	"A Cat and a Kitten's Rock & Roll"; Transliteration: "Neko to Koneko no R & R (Rokkunrōru)" (Japanese: 猫と子猫のR&R(ロックンロール))	April 2, 2002
14	"Is Narashino Burning?"; Transliteration: "Narashino wa Moete iru ka?" (Japanese: 習志野は燃えているか?)	April 9, 2002
15	"The Wind Blows at Home, Part 1"; Transliteration: "Kokyō ni Mau Kaze Zenpen" (Japanese: 故郷に舞う風·前編)	April 16, 2002
16	"The Wind Blows at Home, Part 2"; Transliteration: "Kokyō ni Mau Kaze Chūhen" (Japanese: 故郷に舞う風·中編)	April 23, 2002
17	"The Wind Blows at Home, Part 3"; Transliteration: "Kokyō ni Mau Kaze Kōhen" (Japanese: 故郷に舞う風·後編)	April 30, 2002
18	"Deep Sea Party"; Transliteration: "Shinkai Pāti" (Japanese: 深海パーティ)	May 7, 2002
19	"Engaging Six and Seven"; Transliteration: "Engēji Shikkusu Sebun" (Japanese: エンゲージ·シックス·セブン)	May 14, 2002
20	"Venom's Flame"; Transliteration: "Venomu no Hi" (Japanese: ヴェノムの火)	May 21, 2002
21	"Deep Trap"; Transliteration: "Dīpu Torappu" (Japanese: ディープ·トラップ)	May 28, 2002
22	"Jack in the Box"; Transliteration: "Jakku in za Bokkusu" (Japanese: ジャック·イン·ザ·ボックス)	June 4, 2002
23	"Field of Giants"; Transliteration: "Kyojin no Fīrudo" (Japanese: 巨人のフィールド)	June 11, 2002
24	"Into the Blue"; Transliteration: "Intu za Burū" (Japanese: イントゥ·ザ·ブルー)	June 18, 2002

=== Season 2 (2005) ===
No. overall	No. in season	Title	Original release date
25	1	"The End of Day by Day"; Transliteration: "Owaru Hibi" (Japanese: 終わる日々)	July 13, 2005
26	2	"The Scene Below the Water"; Transliteration: "Suimenka no Jōkei" (Japanese: 水面下の状景)	July 20, 2005
27	3	"Labyrinth and Dragon"; Transliteration: "Meikyū to Ryū" (Japanese: 迷宮と竜)	July 27, 2005
28	4	"Daylight"; Transliteration: "Deiraito" (Japanese: デイライト)	August 3, 2005
29	5	"Beautiful Sicily"; Transliteration: "Uruwashiki Shichiria" (Japanese: うるわしきシチリア)	August 10, 2005
30	6	"Edge of Heaven"; Transliteration: "Ejji Obu Hevun" (Japanese: エッジ·オブ·ヘヴン)	August 17, 2005
31	7	"Left Behind"; Transliteration: "Torinokosarete" (Japanese: とりのこされて)	August 24, 2005
32	8	"Jungle Groove"; Transliteration: "Janguru Gurūbu" (Japanese: ジャングル·グルーブ)	September 14, 2005
33	9	"Her Problem"; Transliteration: "Kanojo no Mondai" (Japanese: 彼女の問題)	September 21, 2005
34	10	"Hong Kong in Two"; Transliteration: "Futatsu no Honkon" (Japanese: ふたつの香港)	September 28, 2005
35	11	"His Problem"; Transliteration: "Kare no Mondai" (Japanese: 彼の問題)	October 5, 2005
36	12	"Burning Hong Kong"; Transliteration: "Moeru Honkon" (Japanese: 燃える香港)	October 12, 2005
37	13	"The Continuing Day By Day"; Transliteration: "Tsuzuku Hibi" (Japanese: つづく日々)	October 19, 2005
37.5	OVA	"A Relatively Leisurely Day in the Life of a Fleet Captain"; Transliteration: "Wari to Hima na Sentaichō no Ichinichi" (Japanese: わりとヒマな戦隊長の一日)	May 26, 2006

=== Season 3 (2018) ===
No. overall	No. in season	Title	Original release date
38	1	"Zero Hour"; Transliteration: "Zero Awā" (Japanese: ゼロアワー)	April 13, 2018
39	2	"Damage Control"; Transliteration: "Songai Seigyo" (Japanese: 損害制御)	April 20, 2018
40	3	"Big One Percent"; Transliteration: "BIG ONE PERCENT"	April 27, 2018
41	4	"On My Own"; Transliteration: "On Mai Oun" (Japanese: オン・マイ・オウン)	May 4, 2018
41.5	4.5	"Intermission"	May 11, 2018
42	5	"Welcome To The Jungle"; Transliteration: "WELCOME TO THE JUNGLE"	May 18, 2018
43	6	"Rotten Repose"; Transliteration: "Fuhai no Madoromi" (Japanese: 腐敗のまどろみ)	May 25, 2018
44	7	"Giant Killing"; Transliteration: "Jaianto Kiringu" (Japanese: ジャイアントキリング)	June 1, 2018
45	8	"One-Man Force"; Transliteration: "Wan Man Fōsu" (Japanese: ワン・マン・フォース)	June 8, 2018
45.5	8.5	"Intermission 2"	June 15, 2018
46	9	"The Fallen Witch"; Transliteration: "Ochita Majo" (Japanese: 堕ちた魔女)	June 22, 2018
47	10	"Onward, Onward"; Transliteration: "Mae e, Mae e" (Japanese: 前へ、前へ)	June 29, 2018
48	11	"Stormy Night"; Transliteration: "Sutōmii Naito" (Japanese: ストーミー・ナイト)	July 18, 2018
49	12	"Make My Day"; Transliteration: "Meiku Mai Dei" (Japanese: メイク・マイ・デイ)	July 18, 2018
