= Full Metal Panic! season 1 =

Full Metal Panic!
- Season 1
- Full Metal Panic! DVD, Volume 1 released in North America.
- No. of episodes: 24

Release
- Original release: January 8 – June 18, 2002

Season chronology
- Next → Season 2

Full Metal Panic! is a Japanese anime television series directed by Koichi Chigira and animated by Gonzo. They are based on the light novel series of the same name, written by Shoji Gatoh and illustrated by Shiki Douji, using material from the first three novels (Fighting Boy Meets Girl, Running One Night Stand, and Into the Blue) of the series over 24 episodes. The series focuses on Sousuke Sagara, a Sergeant from the mercenary group Mithril who is assigned to enroll into a Japanese high school to protect Kaname Chidori, a student with a special gift. The first season began in Japan, on January 8, 2002, and ended on June 18, 2002.

The opening theme song to Full Metal Panic! was "tomorrow", while its ending theme song was "Never Dying Flower" (枯れない花, Karenai Hana), both performed by Mikuni Shimokawa. For the North American release, the series was licensed by ADV Films.

== Episode list ==
No.	Title	Original release date
1	"The Guy I Kinda Like is a Sergeant"; Transliteration: "Ki ni Naru Aitsu wa Gunsō" (Japanese: 気になるあいつは軍曹)	January 8, 2002
Three members of Mithril's Special Response Team (Sousuke Sagara, Kurz Weber, and Melissa Mao) are assigned to protect Kaname Chidori from terrorist organizations. Because of Sousuke's age and Japanese heritage, he enrolls at Kaname's school, Jindai High, as an undercover student. However, because of his speech and actions, he comes across as "weird" to Chidori, though she admits he is "interesting" in a phone call.
2	"I Want to Protect You"; Transliteration: "Mamotte Agetai" (Japanese: 守ってあげたい)	January 15, 2002
Sousuke's military background prevents him from adjusting to school life, overreacting to seemingly harmless situations. Kaname believes that he is a military otaku and is irritated that he constantly follows her wherever she goes.
3	"Lingerie Panic"; Transliteration: "Ranjerī Panikku" (Japanese: ランジェリー·パニック)	January 22, 2002
The SRT springs into action when an intruder is seen sneaking into Kaname's apartment. Meanwhile, the Tuatha de Danaan, Mithril's most advanced submarine commanded by Teletha "Tessa" Testarossa, launches a missile strike on a Whispered research facility in the USSR.
4	"Kidnap"; Transliteration: "Kiddo Nappu" (Japanese: キッド·ナップ)	January 29, 2002
Kaname and Sousuke's class go on a field trip to Okinawa, but Gauron, a terrorist operative, hijacks their plane and diverts it to a base near Lake Khanka in the USSR. The terrorists kidnap Kaname and subject her to scientific testing. Unable to bear the thought of her potential fate, Sousuke infiltrates the base and attempts to rescue Kaname.
5	"Whispered"; Transliteration: "Sasayakareshi Mono (Wisupādo)" (Japanese: 囁かれし者(ウィスパード))	February 5, 2002
Sousuke saves Kaname and commandeers an Arm Slave (AS) while Mithril launches a rescue operation. When Sousuke confronts Gauron, Melissa and Kurz arrive to provide back-up so he and Kaname can escape with the other students; however, they miss the rescue planes and are left behind.
6	"Still Alive"; Transliteration: "STILL ALIVE"	February 12, 2002
Sousuke and Kaname seek refuge in the woods, where they find Kurz who was wounded after Gauron destroyed his AS. As the enemy closes in, the three attempt to communicate with Mithril. Under fire, help arrives just in time when Mithril sends Sousuke's new AS, the Arbalest.
7	"Boy Meets Girl"; Transliteration: "Bōi Mītsu Gāru" (Japanese: ボーイ·ミーツ·ガール)	February 19, 2002
During his battle with Gauron, Sousuke struggles with the Arbalest's Lambda Driver. While watching the fight, Kaname begins to learn of her Whispered abilities, instructing Sousuke how to precisely operate the machine. With Kaname's help, Sousuke manages to defeat Gauron and the Tuatha De Danaan rescues him and Kaname.
8	"Part Time Steady"; Transliteration: "Pātotaimu Sutedi" (Japanese: パートタイム·ステディ)	February 26, 2002
When Mizuki Inaba's boyfriend, Shirai, asks Kaname out, a jealous Mizuki spreads vicious lies about her around the school. However, Mizuki's actions causes her boyfriend to dump her for being overbearing. Mizuki is then forced to ask Sousuke to be her boyfriend when she meets with her friends.
9	"Dangerous Safe House"; Transliteration: "Abunai Sēfu Hausu" (Japanese: あぶないセーフハウス)	March 5, 2002
Tessa is sent to see Takuma Kugayama, a young boy captured at Narita whom Mithril suspects of being capable of operating the Lambda Driver. However, the A21 terrorist group attacks the compound to free their comrade, but Tessa flees with him to Sousuke's safe house.
10	"Run, Running, Ran"; Transliteration: "Ran Ranningu Ran" (Japanese: ラン·ランニング·ラン)	March 12, 2002
Kaname visits Sousuke's apartment, becoming involved with Mithril's situation. They realize that the apartment is no longer safe, taking Takuma to the Jindai High campus for safekeeping. However, the terrorists locate him and capture Tessa and Kaname. Sousuke is forced to give up Takuma for the two girls.
11	"Behemoth Awakening"; Transliteration: "Behemosu Kakusei" (Japanese: ベヘモス覚醒)	March 19, 2002
The hostage exchange goes awry, and instead Tessa and Kaname are taken to the terrorists' hide-out inside a tanker. Sousuke regroups with Kurz and Melissa to rescue their friends. During the rescue attempt, Takuma activates the massive Behemoth AS.
12	"One Night Stand"; Transliteration: "Wan Naito Sutando" (Japanese: ワン·ナイト·スタンド)	March 26, 2002
The Behemoth chases Sousuke, Kurz, Kaname, and Tessa through the city streets while Mithril dispatches the Arbalest to fight the Behemoth. With the help of Tessa and Kaname's Whispered abilities, Sousuke locates the Behemoth's weak spot and destroys it.
13	"A Cat and a Kitten's Rock & Roll"; Transliteration: "Neko to Koneko no R & R (Rokkunrōru)" (Japanese: 猫と子猫のR&R(ロックンロール))	April 2, 2002
During a heated argument with Melissa, Tessa challenges her to an AS duel. However, Tessa realizes that she may be in over her head and asks Sousuke to be her AS coach.
14	"Is Narashino Burning?"; Transliteration: "Narashino wa Moete iru ka?" (Japanese: 習志野は燃えているか?)	April 9, 2002
Sousuke, Kaname, and their friends visit the Narashino military festival during their summer break. At the festival's annual AS competition, Sousuke helps out the Narashino team (an element of the 1st Airborne Brigade), who lose to the Nerima team every year. His classmate, Shinji Kazama, a military otaku, also reconciles with his father, who is the Narashino team's commanding officer.
15	"The Wind Blows at Home, Part 1"; Transliteration: "Kokyō ni Mau Kaze Zenpen" (Japanese: 故郷に舞う風·前編)	April 16, 2002
Sousuke is sent to Helmajistan after Gauron is found to be alive. He is temporarily assigned to an AS squad from Mithril's Indian Ocean corps in a mission to kill Gauron, but because of his young age, his presence is met with derision. They ignore Sousuke's advice and their first encounter with Gauron ends in disaster. They also commandeer a nuclear-armed ballistic missile Gauron was planning to sell on the black market.
16	"The Wind Blows at Home, Part 2"; Transliteration: "Kokyō ni Mau Kaze Chūhen" (Japanese: 故郷に舞う風·中編)	April 23, 2002
Sousuke and the remaining team members take refuge in a cave hideout. However, he is unaware that an old friend from his child soldier days, Zaied, is fighting alongside Gauron. Zaied's insight into Sousuke's tactical planning gives him and Gauron the strategic advantage.
17	"The Wind Blows at Home, Part 3"; Transliteration: "Kokyō ni Mau Kaze Kōhen" (Japanese: 故郷に舞う風·後編)	April 30, 2002
Sousuke fights and eventually kills Zaied while Gauron finishes off the remaining Mithril team. After Zaied falls, he then confronts Gauron and when their Lambda Drivers collide, Sousuke emerges as the sole victor.
18	"Deep Sea Party"; Transliteration: "Shinkai Pāti" (Japanese: 深海パーティ)	May 7, 2002
Kaname is nervous when Sousuke asks her to go to a secluded island with him, but is less enthused when the island turns out to be Mithril's base. An emerging situation forces Sousuke to immediately report to the Tuatha de Danaan with Kaname still in tow. When she arrives aboard the Tuatha de Danaan, she is surprised at the royal treatment she receives and is invited to the submarine's first anniversary party.
19	"Engaging Six and Seven"; Transliteration: "Engēji Shikkusu Sebun" (Japanese: エンゲージ·シックス·セブン)	May 14, 2002
Melissa recounts to Tessa and Kaname how she recruited Kurz and Sousuke into the SRT. She said they were unlikely candidates while she was searching for new members; however, the combat skills they exhibit during a mission changed her mind. Sousuke later takes Kaname on a tour of the submarine.
20	"Venom's Flame"; Transliteration: "Venomu no Hi" (Japanese: ヴェノムの火)	May 21, 2002
Tessa shares with Kaname the nature of resonance between two Whispered. Meanwhile, the SRT prepares for a mission against terrorists led by Gauron, who survived the Helmajistan incident and is wreaking havoc at Palau's Berildaob island. During the battle, Gauron is captured, but Melissa ends up gravely injured.
21	"Deep Trap"; Transliteration: "Dīpu Torappu" (Japanese: ディープ·トラップ)	May 28, 2002
Overcome with guilt over Melissa's condition, Sousuke lashes out at Kaname telling her that she is a burden. Overhearing the conversation, Kurz hits Sousuke telling him that Sousuke made Kaname cry and it is men like him that turn into bad husbands. Realizing his mistake, he looks for Kaname to apologize; however, with help from SRT traitors, Gauron takes control of the Tuatha de Danaan AI with a special program, holding Kaname, Tessa, and the command crew hostage.
22	"Jack in the Box"; Transliteration: "Jakku in za Bokkusu" (Japanese: ジャック·イン·ザ·ボックス)	June 4, 2002
To discredit Mithril, Gauron uses the Tuatha de Danaan to attack the USS Bunker Hill (CG-52), which is patrolling just nearby. Using resonance, Tessa communicates to Kaname a plan to regain control of the submarine, then creates a diversion that allows Kaname to escape. Gauron's men pursue her, but Sousuke and Kurz arrive in time to help. Kalinin visits the Bunker Hill to convince the U.S. Navy not to respond in force after Gauron fires two Harpoons at the ship.
23	"Field of Giants"; Transliteration: "Kyojin no Fīrudo" (Japanese: 巨人のフィールド)	June 11, 2002
Kaname connects herself directly to the Tuatha de Danaan computer system and re-programs it while Sousuke heads to the Tuatha de Danaan bridge. He rescues Tessa and the crew, but Gauron manages to escape. As Gauron is about to destroy the Tuatha de Danaan with his Venom AS, Sousuke activates his Arbalest. The U.S. Navy calls off the attack on the submarine.
24	"Into the Blue"; Transliteration: "Intu za Burū" (Japanese: イントゥ·ザ·ブルー)	June 18, 2002
Sousuke and Gauron fight each other within the confines of the Tuatha de Danaan hangar. As they struggle, Gauron activates his AS's self-destruct mechanism to destroy both himself and the Tuatha de Danaan. With Kaname's help, Sousuke jettisons Gauron's AS from the submarine just as it explodes. Back at Merida Island, Tessa sends home the remains of two SRT members killed during the takeover.
