= List of Full Metal Panic! light novels =

Cover of the first Full Metal Panic! light novel written by Shoji Gatoh.

The light novel series Full Metal Panic! is written by Shoji Gatoh and illustrated by Shikidouji. It was serialized by Fujimi Shobo in its monthly magazine Gekkan Dragon Magazine since September 9, 1998, and published under their Fujimi Fantasia Bunko imprint. Gatoh often found delays in writing of the novels, which led to delays in the publication of the series' volumes. The series focuses on Sergeant Sousuke Sagara's arrival to the Jindai High School where he was assigned to protect the student Kaname Chidori while also acting as a student.

A total of twelve volumes have also been released from September 18, 1998, to August 20, 2010. In parallel to the twelve volumes, eleven standalone light novels of the series have also been published starting on December 17, 1998. In contrast to the regular series, these light novels focus on the comedy elements from the series. In January 2010, Gatoh wrote another of these stories in celebration of Gekkan Dragon Magazine's 300th issue. Another series of spin-off novels known as Full Metal Panic! Another, written by Naoto Ōguro and also illustrated by Shikidouji, was released from August 20, 2011, to February 20, 2016, consisting of thirteen volumes and is set years after the original series' ending. The light novels have also been adapted into various manga, as well as four anime television series for which Gatoh was also part of the staff.

Tokyopop licensed the Full Metal Panic! series for North America release, publishing the first regular light novel on September 11, 2007. The latest released volume is the fourth on February 1, 2011, which is a compilation from the original fourth and fifth volumes from the series. The main 12 light novels were re-licensed by J-Novel Club in March 2019. On July 1, 2022, J-Novel announced that they were translating the short stories.

== Full Metal Panic! novel list ==
=== Novels ===
No.	Title	Original release date	English release date
1-1	Fighting Boy Meets Girl 戦うボーイ・ミーツ・ガール	September 18, 1998; 978-4-8291-2839-8	September 11, 2007; May 3, 2019 (e-book); 978-1-4278-0243-9; 978-1718350502
Prologue; 1: Mission to School; 2: The View Below the Water; 3: Bad Trip; 4: Field of Giants; 5: Black Technology; Epilogue
1-2	Rampaging One Night Stand 疾（はし）るワン・ナイト・スタンド	March 18, 1999; 978-4-8291-2875-6	January 8, 2008; July 6, 2019 (e-book); 978-1-4278-0244-6; 978-1718350502
Prologue; 1: Foreign Customs; 2: The Baton Passes to Uruz-7; 3: He Who Chases Two Hares...; 4: The Fuse of Battle; 5: Behemoth; Epilogue
1-3	Trembling Into the Blue 揺れるイントゥ・ザ・ブルー	February 14, 2000; 978-4-8291-2953-1	June 17, 2008; September 6, 2019 (e-book); 978-1-4278-0245-3; 978-1718350502
Prologue; 1: Toy Box; 2: Deep Sea Party; 3: Water Pressure, Gravitational Pressure, Political Pressure; 4: The Venom Spreads; 5: Into the Blue; Epilogue
1-4	Ending Day by Day: Part 1 終わるデイ・バイ・デイ 上	November 10, 2000; 978-4-8291-1307-3	February 1, 2011; October 28, 2019 (e-book); 978-1-4278-0246-0; 978-1718350526
Prologue; 1: Code of Silence; 2: The View Below the Water II; 3: Black and White
1-5	Ending Day by Day: Part 2 終わるデイ・バイ・デイ 下	April 20, 2001; 978-4-8291-1349-3	February 1, 2011; December 30, 2019 (e-book); 978-1-4278-0246-0; 978-1718350526
3: Black and White (Continued); 4: Her Problem; 5: His Problem; Epilogue
1-6	Dancing Very Merry Christmas 踊るベリー・メリー・クリスマス	March 20, 2003; 978-4-8291-1505-3	March 29, 2020 (e-book); 978-1718350526
Prologue; 1: Unfixed Schedule; 2: O Noisy Night; 3: Two Captains; 4: The Executors; 5: Sleepless Christmas Eve; Epilogue
1-7	Continuing On My Own つづくオン・マイ・オウン	October 20, 2004; 978-4-8291-1659-3	June 29, 2020 (e-book); 978-1718350519
Prologue; 1: Prophecy and Visit; 2: Heat; 3: Damage Control; 4: Damage Report; 5: When the Crossbow Breaks; Epilogue
1-8	Burning One-Man Force 燃えるワン・マン・フォース	January 20, 2006; 978-4-8291-1793-4	September 2, 2020 (e-book); 978-1718350519
Prologue; 1: Arena; 2: New World; 3: Real Bout; 4: Collateral Damage; 5: Man on Fire; Epilogue
1-9	Gathering Make My Day つどうメイク・マイ・デイ	March 20, 2007; 978-4-8291-1911-2	November 22, 2020 (e-book); 978-1718350519
Prologue; 1: Fallen Witch; 2: Briefing; 3: Front Toward Enemy; 4: On a Stormy Night; 5: Flaming Sword; Epilogue
1-10	Approaching Nick of Time せまるニック・オブ・タイム	February 20, 2008; 978-4-8291-3266-1	February 20, 2021 (e-book); 978-1718350533
Prologue; 1: Wall of Sand; 2: On a Journey; 3: Yamsk-11; 4: Time Hazard; 5: The Enchanted Bullet; Epilogue
1-11	Forever Stand by Me: Part 1 ずっと、スタンド・バイ・ミー 上	July 17, 2010; 978-4-8291-3410-8	April 23, 2021 (e-book); 978-1718350533
Prologue; 1. Before the Storm; 2: Long Goodbye; 3: Pale Horse
1-12	Forever Stand by Me: Part 2 ずっと、スタンド・バイ・ミー 下	August 20, 2010; 978-4-8291-3553-2	June 25, 2021 (e-book); 978-1718350533
3: Pale Horse (Continued); 4: Lovers' Dilemma; 5: Proof of Humanity; Epilogue

=== Short stories ===
No.	Title	Original release date	English release date
2-1	Intriguing One-Man Band? 放っておけない一匹狼（ローン・ウルフ）	December 17, 1998; 978-4-8291-2857-2	August 25, 2022 (e-book)
Man from the South; Propaganda of Love and Hat; Summer Illusion of Steel; My Boyfriend is a Specialist; The Hamburger Hill of Art; Cinderella Panic
2-2	Unflinching Two-Out Inning? 本気になれない二死満塁？	May 18, 1999; 978-4-8291-2887-9	October 13, 2022 (e-book)
A Hostage of No Compromise; A Lunchtime of Wasted Effort; Lethal Weapon of Blasphemy; The War Cry of Overkill; Single-minded Strike Out; Captain Amigo and Golden Days
2-3	Unpolished Three-Ring Circus? 自慢にならない三冠王？	October 13, 1999; 978-4-8291-2926-5	December 1, 2022 (e-book)
A Hostility Born of One-Sided Rivalry; A Suicide of Inconvenience; A Hard-Sell Fetish; An Eloquent Portrait; The Patients of Darkness; Cat & Kitten R&R
2-4	Indifferent Four-Wind Scattering? 同情できない四面楚歌？	June 14, 2000; 978-4-8291-2974-6	February 2, 2023 (e-book)
Who Killed Cock Robin (of the Rocky Shores)?; The Innocent of Remembrance (Part 1); The Innocent of Remembrance (Part 2); An Adult Sneaking Mission; Engage, Six, Seven
2-5	Unquenchable Five-Alarm Fire? どうにもならない五里霧中？	October 19, 2001; 978-4-8291-1389-9	March 30, 2023 (e-book)
A Pure Yet Impure Grappler; A Trespass on Good Faith; Fancies Without Honor or Humanity; The Afterschool Peacekeeper; The Lost Old Dog; The Relatively Uneventful Days of a Battle Group Commander
2-6	Inevitable Six Feet Under? あてにならない六法全書？	June 20, 2002; 978-4-8291-1441-4	June 8, 2023 (e-book)
Uncooperative Bluebird; Off-Target Emotion; An Error-Ridden Sentence; A Past-Deadline Romance; The Fifth Period Hot Spot; The Goddess Comes to Japan (Suffering Chapter)
2-7	Untenable Seventh Heaven Feeling? 安心できない七つ道具？	July 19, 2003; 978-4-8291-1540-4	August 10, 2023 (e-book)
A Concealment Full of Holes; The Self-Serving Blues; The Turnabout Drunkard's; Undercover of Obligated Empathy; The Midnight Raiders; A Fugue for Old Soldiers
2-8	Unflappable Eight Ball Angle? 悩んでられない八方塞がり？	July 20, 2005; 978-4-8291-1740-8	October 12, 2023 (e-book)
The Obligatory Virtual Reality (Part 1); The Obligatory Virtual Reality (Part 2); The Showbiz Kagemusha; Festival of Opposition; Festival of Love and Hate
2-9	Unavoidable Nine-Day Wonder? マジで危ない九死に一生?	August 20, 2011; 978-4-8291-3668-3	December 14, 2023 (e-book)
The Hooligans' Rule (Part 1); The Hooligans' Rule (Part 2); The Local Surveyor; The Adorable Thermopylae; Tessa's Visit to the Grave

=== Side stories ===
No.	Title	Japanese release date	Japanese ISBN
3-1	Side Arms - A Sad (Tonal) Range, A Faraway (Firing) Range サイドアームズ - 音程は哀しく、射程は遠く	April 20, 2004	978-4-8291-1605-0
Ontei wa Kanashiku, Shatei wa Tooku (First Half); Ontei wa Kanashiku, Shatei wa Tooku (Second Half); Ed Sax Chuu-i no Kiwamete Senmonteki na Tatakai; Megami no Rainichi (Onsen Hen); Yoiko no Jikan~Mao Neesan to Arm Slave ni Notte Miyou~; Aru Sakusen Chokuzen no Hitomaku
3-2	Side Arms 2 - Voice From the North サイドアームズ2 - 極北からの声	July 20, 2006	978-4-8291-1842-9
Kyokuhoku Kara no Koe; Tuatha de Danaan no Tanjou; Oogui no Comrade

== Full Metal Panic! Another novel list ==
=== Novels ===
No.	Title	Japanese release date	Japanese ISBN
4-1	Full Metal Panic! Another 1 (フルメタル・パニック! アナザー1)	August 20, 2011	978-4-8291-3669-0
4-2	Full Metal Panic! Another 2 (フルメタル・パニック! アナザー2)	December 20, 2011	978-4-8291-3709-3
4-3	Full Metal Panic! Another 3 (フルメタル・パニック! アナザー3)	March 17, 2012	978-4-8291-3739-0
4-4	Full Metal Panic! Another 4 (フルメタル・パニック! アナザー4)	August 20, 2012	978-4-8291-3789-5
4-5	Full Metal Panic! Another 5 (フルメタル・パニック! アナザー5)	February 20, 2013	978-4-8291-3856-4
4-6	Full Metal Panic! Another 6 (フルメタル・パニック! アナザー6)	September 20, 2013	978-4-8291-3933-2
4-7	Full Metal Panic! Another 7 (フルメタル・パニック! アナザー7)	January 18, 2014	978-4-04-070003-8
4-8	Full Metal Panic! Another 8 (フルメタル・パニック! アナザー8)	August 20, 2014	978-4-04-070279-7
4-9	Full Metal Panic! Another 9 (フルメタル・パニック! アナザー9)	November 20, 2014	978-4-04-070382-4
4-10	Full Metal Panic! Another 10 (フルメタル・パニック! アナザー10)	February 20, 2015	978-4-04-070280-3
4-11	Full Metal Panic! Another 11 (フルメタル・パニック! アナザー11)	September 19, 2015	978-4-04-070668-9
4-12	Full Metal Panic! Another 12 (フルメタル・パニック! アナザー12)	February 20, 2016	978-4-04-070669-6

=== Short stories ===
No.	Title	Japanese release date	Japanese ISBN
5-1	Full Metal Panic! Another SS (フルメタル・パニック! アナザーSS)	February 20, 2016	978-4-04-070667-2
