= Full Metal Panic! season 2 =

Full Metal Panic!
- Season 2
- No. of episodes: 13

Release
- Original release: July 13 – October 19, 2005

Season chronology
- ← Previous; Season 1 Next → Season 3

The second season of Full Metal Panic!, titled Full Metal Panic! The Second Raid, is a Japanese anime television series directed by Yasuhiro Takemoto and animated by Kyoto Animation. It is the third television series based on the Full Metal Panic! light novel series and is adapted from the two Ending Day by Day novels (volumes four and five). It continues the story from the first anime series, with Sousuke Sagara and his allies from Mithril facing a new organization opposing them called "Amalgam".

The series aired from July 13, 2005, to October 19, 2005. An additional OVA episode was released on DVD. The opening theme was "Southerly Wind" (南風, Minami Kaze) and the ending theme was "I Want to See You Again" (もう一度君に会いたい, Mou Ichido Kimi ni Aitai), both performed by Mikuni Shimokawa. The series was licensed for the North American market by Funimation but the production work and English dubbing was done by ADV Films.

== Episode list ==
No. overall	No. in season	Title	Original release date
25	1	"The End of Day by Day"; Transliteration: "Owaru Hibi" (Japanese: 終わる日々)	July 13, 2005
Mithril and the SRT rescue refugees caught in a civil war in the African country of Balic. However, during the fighting, they discover that the enemy possesses advanced weaponry rivaling their own. They surmise that a highly funded, well-equipped organization may be supplying their enemies.
26	2	"The Scene Below the Water"; Transliteration: "Suimenka no Jōkei" (Japanese: 水面下の状景)	July 20, 2005
Sousuke and Kazama investigate who is posting embarrassing and revealing pictures of Kaname on the internet. Meanwhile, Amalgam operatives led by Gates extract payment from the Balic military force that took on Mithril and try to reconstruct what happened in the battle.
27	3	"Labyrinth and Dragon"; Transliteration: "Meikyū to Ryū" (Japanese: 迷宮と竜)	July 27, 2005
In Nanjing, Amalgam kidnaps peace delegations from Northern and Southern China and fortify themselves in a tunnel beneath the Yangtze River. Mithril attempts a rescue in the tunnel's dangerous confines but falls into Amalgam's trap.
28	4	"Daylight"; Transliteration: "Deiraito" (Japanese: デイライト)	August 3, 2005
Mithril is perplexed at how the enemy is able to follow their movements. Once they realize that their communications have been compromised, Tessa and Commander Andrei Kalinin give false orders to facilitate the rescue and turn the tables on Amalgam.
29	5	"Beautiful Sicily"; Transliteration: "Uruwashiki Shichiria" (Japanese: うるわしきシチリア)	August 10, 2005
The SRT travels to Sicily to capture the traitor from the Nanjing operation. Sousuke has difficulties balancing work and school when he tries to have a phone conversation with Kaname and to drive a getaway vehicle at the same time. A mysterious AS also appears to help the team get away. Seeing the stress of his everyday duties, Mao decides to ask Sousuke about his own plans for the future.
30	6	"Edge of Heaven"; Transliteration: "Ejji Obu Hevun" (Japanese: エッジ·オブ·ヘヴン)	August 17, 2005
Mithril attempts to learn more about the mysterious Amalgam organization. Sousuke and Kaname's relationship begins to blossom; however, the Mithril leadership forbids him from seeing her after his bodyguard duties are assigned to another agent.
31	7	"Left Behind"; Transliteration: "Torinokosarete" (Japanese: とりのこされて)	August 24, 2005
Sousuke argues with his replacement, Agent Wraith, about the mission to protect Kaname. Kaname wonders why Sousuke has not been attending classes in days and starts to become worried. When she needs to see him after a chance encounter with Amalgam agent Xia Yu Lan, she finds his apartment vacant, and he has disappeared.
32	8	"Jungle Groove"; Transliteration: "Janguru Gurūbu" (Japanese: ジャングル·グルーブ)	September 14, 2005
After Sousuke arrives back at Merida Island, Tessa berates him for emotionally involving himself with Kaname and neglecting his other duties. Lt Belfangan Clouseau, the pilot of the AS seen in the Sicily operation, transfers to the SRT as its new commander. After he clashes with Kurz at the bar upon offending the memory of the SRT's dead comrades, Clouseau stages an AS duel to help Sousuke properly operate the Arbalest.
33	9	"Her Problem"; Transliteration: "Kanojo no Mondai" (Japanese: 彼女の問題)	September 21, 2005
Kaname confronts Agent Wraith about Sousuke's departure, but as she is about to get answers, Xia Yu Lan ambushes the two. Kaname outwits her pursuer until Leonard Testarossa, another Amalgam agent who is also Tessa's brother, shows up and kills Xia Yu Lan. He reveals that the assassin was a rogue agent acting outside of Amalgam's interests.
34	10	"Hong Kong in Two"; Transliteration: "Futatsu no Honkon" (Japanese: ふたつの香港)	September 28, 2005
Xia Yu Lan's twin sister, Yu Fan, hijacks a Venom AS to become an agent provocateur between the Northern and Southern Chinese Army units in Hong Kong. Sousuke and Melissa are deployed by Gavin Hunter to the area in a team of SRT/PRT personnel of East Asian origin to find the AS, but his feelings for Kaname nearly places the Mithril reconnaissance force in danger. After a tough sermon from Melissa touches a raw nerve, Sousuke deserts the team.
35	11	"His Problem"; Transliteration: "Kare no Mondai" (Japanese: 彼の問題)	October 5, 2005
Sousuke continues to wander in Hong Kong and encounters a prostitute who looks very much like Kaname. Tessa is "forced" by Admiral Jerome Borda to deploy Clouseau, Melissa, and Kurz to the island after sightings of the Venom AS are confirmed.
36	12	"Burning Hong Kong"; Transliteration: "Moeru Honkon" (Japanese: 燃える香港)	October 12, 2005
Xia Yu Fan leads Sousuke to Gauron while she runs off to fight Clouseau, Melissa, and Kurz in Hong Kong as Northern and Southern China teeter on the brink of hostilities. Now crippled and about to die, Gauron explains the truth about Amalgam and taunts Sousuke by claiming to have killed Kaname because it changed him into someone weak. Enraged, Sousuke kills Gauron and gets out of the building just as a bomb under his bed explodes. Gates and his Amalgam team also arrive to kill Xia Yu Fan. Tessa launches the Arbalest despite Mithril's orders not to.
37	13	"The Continuing Day By Day"; Transliteration: "Tsuzuku Hibi" (Japanese: つづく日々)	October 19, 2005
Still demoralized by Gauron's claims of killing Kaname, Sousuke still refuses to function until Kaname finally appears to get him back on his feet. Inspired by her presence, Sousuke pilots the Arbalest again to destroy Gates and his men. Kaname returns home to Japan. Sousuke faces the Mithril command, which grants his request to stay with Kaname even if his wages are reduced.
37.5	OVA	"A Relatively Leisurely Day in the Life of a Fleet Captain"; Transliteration: "Wari to Hima na Sentaichō no Ichinichi" (Japanese: わりとヒマな戦隊長の一日)	May 26, 2006
Set sometime after the events of Continuing Day By Day, Tessa spends the day trying to find out why she awoke half-naked on the Tuatha de Danaan bridge, as well as looking for her favorite stuffed animal that she likes to sleep with. She encounters many of the crew members and discovers some unique traits of theirs. At the end of the day, she catches up to a departing Sousuke and tells him something very important. Surrounded by noise and being his usually block-headed self, Sousuke misinterprets her message.
