= Full Metal Panic! season 3 =

Full Metal Panic!
- Season 3
- No. of episodes: 12

Release
- Original release: April 13 – July 18, 2018

Season chronology
- ← Previous; Season 2

The third season of Full Metal Panic!, titled Full Metal Panic! Invisible Victory, is a Japanese anime television series directed by Katsuichi Nakayama and animated by Xebec. It is the fourth television series based on the Full Metal Panic! light novel series, based on volumes seven, eight and nine of the main series (Continuing On My Own, Burning One Man Force and Come Make My Day), with the surviving members of Mithril trying to recompose after suffering a critical attack from Amalgam, and Sousuke traveling around the world, looking for Chidori after she was kidnapped, while evading enemies sent to assassinate him. Volume 6 Dancing Very Merry Christmas is left unadapted by the anime and was instead made into an audio drama.

The series aired from April 13, 2018, to July 18, 2018. The opening theme is "Even...if" and the ending theme is "yes", both performed by Tamaru Yamada with versions in Japanese (until episode 4) and English (from episode 5 to episode 11). For episode 12, the ending theme is "tomorrow" by Mikuni Shimokawa. The series is licensed for the North American and Australasian market by Funimation, and in the UK market by Anime Limited.

== Episode list ==
No. overall	No. in season	Title	Original release date
38	1	"Zero Hour"; Transliteration: "Zero Awā" (Japanese: ゼロアワー)	April 13, 2018
Tessa and Leonard confront each other over their parents' graves, declaring that they will oppose each other. In Tokyo, Leonard meets Chidori and Sousuke, warning them that Amalgam will begin to take more aggressive measures to obtain Chidori and offering her to come with him. Chidori refuses, and Sousuke requests extraction from Mithril, who agree to send a helicopter to pick them up. Meanwhile, Amalgam disrupts worldwide communications and begins attacking Mithril bases, putting the whole organization in chaos. Sousuke takes Chidori to the extraction point where they are surrounded by Amalgam forces.
39	2	"Damage Control"; Transliteration: "Songai Seigyo" (Japanese: 損害制御)	April 20, 2018
Sousuke attempts to evade Amalgam forces and manages to meet up with the helicopter, but it is shot down. Fortunately, the helicopter was also carrying the Arbalest, and Sousuke uses it to defeat the Amalgam troops and escape. Chidori is shocked at all of the death and destruction caused by Amalgam's attack. Meanwhile, Amalgam bombards Mithril's Merida Island base with missiles and artillery while a large airborne landing force and three Behemoths approach the island. With the Tuatha de Danaan still undergoing maintenance, the base's garrison must find a way to hold off the Behemoths until it is ready to evacuate the base. Back in Tokyo, Chidori receives a message on her phone that her friends are being held hostage to lure her out of hiding.
40	3	"Big One Percent"; Transliteration: "BIG ONE PERCENT"	April 27, 2018
The Merida Island garrison attempts to battle the 3 approaching Behemoths, but only manages to destroy one while suffering heavy casualties. Meanwhile, Amalgam troops land on the island and begin assaulting the base. Tessa orders that the refueling of the Tuatha de Danaan be halted in order to speed up the evacuation process. In Tokyo, Amalgam agents have planted bombs all over Sousuke and Chidori's school in an effort to draw them out. Chidori tells Sousuke that she knew her normal school life wasn't going to last, and she's scared of what will happen next. Sousuke admits that he's also scared, but he's determined to protect Chidori and everything that she loves. They then both agree to come up with a plan to save their friends.
41	4	"On My Own"; Transliteration: "On Mai Oun" (Japanese: オン・マイ・オウン)	May 4, 2018
Sousuke and Chidori enact their plan to rescue the school, with Al jamming the bomb detonators, giving the students time to evacuate while Sousuke disarms the bomb belt on Kyoko. Wraith arrives to assist when Sousuke is forced to board Arbalest to battle Amalgam's AS units. Leonard then arrives in his own custom AS and easily defeats Sousuke, destroying the Arbalest in the process. Chidori turns herself in to Leonard in return for sparing Sousuke and leaving her friends alone. On Merida Island, Tessa reaches the Tuatha de Danaan and is able to evacuate the remaining Mithril personnel, including Mao, Kurz, and Closeau. Back in Tokyo, Sousuke reveals his status as a Mithril soldier to his classmates and promises to them that he will bring Chidori back.
41.5	4.5	"Intermission"	May 11, 2018
Recap of episodes 1 to 4.
42	5	"Welcome To The Jungle"; Transliteration: "WELCOME TO THE JUNGLE"	May 18, 2018
Three months later, in the small country of NAMSAC, Michel Lemon, a photographer, is saved from some bandits by Nami, a teenager who leads a team who intends to take part in the local AS league. However, in revenge for Nami's interference, Dao, the leader of the bandits, murder Rick, the pilot for her team, and while looking for a replacement, she is approached by Sousuke, who offers himself to the post. Sousuke defeats Dao in his first match with ease, but just as he and Nami are going home, they are attacked once again by Dao's thugs who are defeated and routed away by Sousuke. For their safety, Sousuke and Nami then start living at Lemon's hotel room.
43	6	"Rotten Repose"; Transliteration: "Fuhai no Madoromi" (Japanese: 腐敗のまどろみ)	May 25, 2018
With Lemon as their sponsorship, Sousuke keeps winning in the AS league, until both him and Lemon are arrested under false charges by the local Chief of Police, who demands Sousuke to join a scheme of rigged matches in exchange for his and Lemon's freedom, but Sousuke asks to take part in the underground league instead. Upon being informed of the situation, Nami refuses to help, as the underground league features life or death matches with real weaponry, until Sousuke decides to tell her all the truth, including the fact that the underground league is his only clue to Amalgam's hideout, and she agrees. Meanwhile, the Police Chief is contacted by Kurama from Amalgam, who tells him to beware of Sousuke.
44	7	"Giant Killing"; Transliteration: "Jaianto Kiringu" (Japanese: ジャイアントキリング)	June 1, 2018
As Lemon is released from prison, Sousuke, Nami and their team arrive at the place for the illegal match, but Sousuke is ordered to proceed to the combat area alone, leaving the rest of the team behind, where he discovers that he fell into a trap by Amalgam, and his opponent is using an M9. Despite being far outgunned, Sousuke wins against the enemy after setting a trap for him, and chases after Kurama. Meanwhile, Lemon, whose role as a journalist was only a disguise, rescues the rest of the team from being executed with his men, except for Nami, who is being held hostage by Kurama. Once Sousuke reaches his location, Kurama gives Sousuke 10 seconds to show himself, threatening to kill Nami if he does not comply.
45	8	"One-Man Force"; Transliteration: "Wan Man Fōsu" (Japanese: ワン・マン・フォース)	June 8, 2018
Instead of waiting for Sousuke's reply, Kurama executes Nami in front of him. When Lemon and his forces arrive to confront the police chief's forces Kurama escapes with the police chief. Eager to get revenge on Kurama, Sousuke tracks him down to the AS league stadium, where the other competitors are given heavy weaponry and promised a reward for killing Sousuke. Sousuke defeats all the enemy units, incidentally, killing the police chief, and chases after Kurama. Despite being gravely wounded, Sousuke kills Kurama and is rescued by Lemon and his men. Meanwhile, Wraith gets her hands on the ARX-8, a new AS who is the successor unit of the Arbalest.
45.5	8.5	"Intermission 2"	June 15, 2018
Recap of episodes 5 to 8.
46	9	"The Fallen Witch"; Transliteration: "Ochita Majo" (Japanese: 堕ちた魔女)	June 22, 2018
In San Francisco, a vagrant and disoriented Tessa is found by the authorities and hospitalized. While inquired by Doctor Witt, a psychiatrist, Tessa claims that after escaping Merida Island, her subordinates eventually deserted and abandoned her. Not believing her story, Witt orders Tessa to be transferred to a mental institution, but both are captured and brought to Leonard's aide, Lee Fowler. An accompanying nurse turns out to be Mao and Tessa reveals that she was faking her condition and her story to lay a trap on him. A fight ensues and Lee barely escapes to warn Leonard, who is maintaining Chidori under his custody in Mexico. Meanwhile, on a secluded Polynesian island, Sousuke finally awakens, and Lemon informs him that he was unconscious for fifty-six days since his confrontation with Kurama in Namsac. Soon after, the island is attacked and a weak Sousuke lies helplessly in bed while hearing gunshots outside.
47	10	"Onward, Onward"; Transliteration: "Mae e, Mae e" (Japanese: 前へ、前へ)	June 29, 2018
After the attackers are killed, Sousuke realizes that Al, the Arbalest's A.I. must still be intact, and that Amalgam fears that he may pilot it once again. Meanwhile at the Tuatha de Danaan, Tessa explains to the others that capturing Leonard is their only chance to defeat Amalgam and that Lee is their only clue to find him. In Mexico, Chidori discovers that Sousuke is alive and looking for her, so she decides to do something to help him. While Sousuke and Lemon take shelter in a camp in Florida, the ARX-7 remains are stolen by Kalinin, who defected from Mithril to Amalgam.
48	11	"Stormy Night"; Transliteration: "Sutōmii Naito" (Japanese: ストーミー・ナイト)	July 18, 2018
Based on Kurama's hint, Lemon pinpoints the location where Chidori is being held in Mexico, and Sousuke comes with a plan to rescue her. Meanwhile, the crew of the Tuatha de Danaan discovers that Leonard is based there and also prepare an attack. Unaware of each other, both Sousuke and his former companions from Mithril invade the complex at the same time and join forces to eliminate the resistance. This allows Sousuke to push forward to the compound, but his M6 Arm Slave is destroyed by a booby trap. As he crawls out of the machine Sousuke is surrounded by armed men led by Kalinin, who demands his surrender. Meanwhile Wraith meets up with Lemon with a new Arm Slave, ARX-8 Laevatein developed from Sousuke's old ARX-7 Arbalest and has the same A.I. system.
49	12	"Make My Day"; Transliteration: "Meiku Mai Dei" (Japanese: メイク・マイ・デイ)	July 18, 2018
As Sousuke escapes from Kalinin's ambush, Leonard prepares to leave with Chidori, who realizes that Sousuke is coming to her rescue and refuses to cooperate. Leonard then gives her a chance to shoot him and escape, but she falters. However, once he attempts to take back his weapon, Chidori accidentally shoots him. Kalinin then takes Chidori and the wounded Leonard with him and they leave the island by helicopter, with Sousuke arriving to the heliport a moment too late, just to see her being taken away. A disheartened Sousuke is captured by the enemy when Lemon's team rescues him and airdrops the Laevatein, which he uses to dispatch the remaining enemies with ease. In the helicopter, Chidori steals a gun and demands Kalinin to return, and when he refuses, threatens to kill herself, convincing him to at least let her contact Sousuke by radio. Willing to convince Sousuke to forget about her at first, Chidori has a change of mind and asks him to rescue her no matter what instead, and Sousuke returns to the Tuatha de Danaan, where he is welcomed back by his friends from Mithril.
