= Cop Craft =

Japanese light novel series

- Cop Craft: Dragnet Mirage Reloaded
- Cover of the first light novel, featuring Tilarna Exedilica (left) and Kei Matoba (right)

COP CRAFT(コップクラフト) DRAGNET MIRAGE RELOADED (Koppukurafuto Doragunetto Mirāju Rirōdeddo)
- Genre: Action; Reverse isekai
- Light novel
- Written by: Shoji Gatoh
- Illustrated by: Range Murata
- Published by: Shogakukan
- Imprint: Gagaga Bunko
- Original run: November 18, 2009 – present
- Volumes: 6
- Anime television series
- Directed by: Shin Itagaki
- Produced by: Satoshi Fukao; Kazuhiro Kanemitsu; Hirofumi Ishii; Keisuke Satou
- Written by: Shoji Gatoh
- Music by: Taku Iwasaki
- Studio: Millepensee
- Licensed by: Crunchyroll (Note: In North America through Crunchyroll, LLC (formerly Funimation).); SEA: Muse Communication
- Original network: Tokyo MX, BS11, Wowow
- English network: US: Crunchyroll Channel
- Original run: July 8, 2019 – September 30, 2019
- Episodes: 12

Cop Craft: Dragnet Mirage Reloaded (Japanese: COP CRAFT(コップクラフト) DRAGNET MIRAGE RELOADED, Hepburn: Koppukurafuto Doragunetto Mirāju Rirōdeddo) is a Japanese light novel series, written by Shoji Gatoh and illustrated by Range Murata. Shogakukan have published six volumes since November 2009 under their Gagaga Bunko imprint. An anime television series adaptation by Millepensee aired from July to September 2019.

== Plot ==
Fifteen years ago, a mysterious hyperspace gate appeared over the Pacific Ocean in our world. Elves, fairies, and other fantastic creatures came through the gate from the other side and established diplomatic relations with Earth. In the present day, Kariana Island and its main city of San-Teresa serves as Earth's "front door" to the magical world on the other side of the gate, and over two million non-humans live within the city, mixing with additional human residents. This results in both prosperous growth for the island, and a seedy underbelly of criminals who seek to take advantage of it. The San-Teresa Metropolitan Police Department is established to keep order within the city between those two forces.

After a drug bust goes horribly wrong, Detective Sergeant Kei Matoba loses both the fairy being sold as a catalyst for new drugs and his partner of four years in the Metropolitan Police to a Semanian attacker. Despite his attitude towards the Semanian people he derisively calls "aliens", Matoba is forced to partner with a Semanian knight to find the fairy lost in the drug bust, as they consider the fairy an important Semanian citizen. From there, Matoba slowly learns to tolerate the Semanian people, while the knight slowly acclimates herself to Earth and its customs.

== Main characters ==
Kei Matoba (ケイ・マトバ)
Voiced by: Kenjiro Tsuda (Japanese); David Matranga (English)
A former JSDF soldier turned Detective Sergeant for the San-Teresa Metropolitan Police. He has a hostile attitude towards non-human "aliens" from the world beyond the gate, but slowly softens his attitude while working with Tilarna. Kei is willing to bend the rules or associate with unscrupulous people in order to accomplish his tasks.
Tilarna Exedilica (ティラナ・エクセディリカ, Tirana Ekusedirika)
Voiced by: Mayu Yoshioka (Japanese); Felecia Angelle (English)
A noble Knight of Mirvor with a long name who has come through the gate to rescue the kidnapped fairy and punish those responsible for kidnapping her. She wields a sword and can use some magic but is unaccustomed to Earth and its modern technology.
Cecil Epps (セシル・エップス, Seshiru Eppisu)
Voiced by: Fumiko Orikasa (Japanese); Apphia Yu (English)
Deputy coroner with the San-Teresa MPD. Kei's ex-girlfriend who still holds some feelings for him.
Jack Roth (ジャック・ロス, Jakku Rosu)
Voiced by: Kenji Hamada (Japanese); Andy Mullins (English)
A corrupt chief of the San-Teresa Metropolitan Police Department Special Public Morals Division. He later reveals himself to be secretly assisting Zelada to spark a war between the humans and the Semanian people, fearing that the Earth's human population will be overrun by people from the other world in a peaceful time.
Biz O'Neill (ビズ・オニール, Bizu Onīru)
Voiced by: Wataru Takagi (Japanese); Christopher Dontrell Piper (English)
A black market dealer who runs the strip club "Lady Chapel" while putting up a thin guise of acting like a priest. Kei tolerates him as a confidential informant.
Kenny (ケニー, Kenī)
Voiced by: Volcano Ōta (Japanese); Randy E. Aguebor (English)
A bouncer and bodyguard who works for Biz O'Neill.
Zelada (ゼラーダ, Zerāda)
Voiced by: Hōchū Ōtsuka (Japanese); Barry Yandell (English)
A powerful mage who can control dead bodies overdosed on fairy dust like puppets. Later revealed to be the evil mage responsible for wiping out most of Kei's unit during a battle years ago.

== Media ==
=== Light novels ===
The first light novel volume was published on November 18, 2009, by Shogakukan under their Gagaga Bunko imprint. Six volumes have been published as of October 2016.

No.	Release date	ISBN
1	November 18, 2009	978-4-09-451172-7
2	June 18, 2010	978-4-09-451209-0
3	January 18, 2011	978-4-09-451245-8
4	June 18, 2014	978-4-09-451471-1
5	June 18, 2015	978-4-09-451544-2
6	October 18, 2016	978-4-09-451630-2

=== Anime ===
An anime television series adaptation was announced on December 29, 2018. The series aired from July 8 to September 30, 2019, on Tokyo MX, BS11, and Wowow. The series was directed by Shin Itagaki and animated by Millepensee, with Shoji Gatoh himself penning the series' scripts, Hiromi Kimura designing the characters for animation and Taku Iwasaki composing the music. Masayoshi Ōishi performed the series' opening theme song "Rakuen Toshi", while Mayu Yoshioka performed the series' ending theme song "Connected". Funimation licensed the series outside Asia for a SimulDub. In Southeast Asia, Muse Communication holds the rights to the series.

No. in season	Title	Original release date
1	"Cop Show, Witch Craft"	July 8, 2019
While performing what appears to be a routine drug bust on a couple of criminals in San-Teresa looking to trade a kidnapped fairy, one of the suspects breaks free from his handcuffs with some magical power, survives several 9mm shots, and snaps the neck of one detective before escaping with the fairy. The surviving detective, Kei Matoba, informs the widow of his dead partner Rick Fury before returning home. Kei wants to hunt down Rick's murderer, but his superiors insist he meet up with a Semanian noble the next day as he speaks their language. Kei reluctantly accepts their request, riding on a ship with the local Coast Guard to meet the noble. He is surprised to find the noble is a little girl named Tilarna Exedilica who proclaims herself a Knight of Mirvor who has come to rescue the fairy and punish those who kidnapped her under a treaty established with the United Nations that gives her nation the authority to do so. Despite Kei's hostility towards non-human people he considers "aliens," his superiors force him to team up with her. Tilarna quickly reveals her unfamiliarity with Earth customs and technology as Kei constantly warns her not to touch anything. Later, Kei gets a tip that a Mexican gang of smugglers is involved with the kidnapped fairy, and he visits the shady priest Biz O'Neill for information. He follows the lead to an apartment building where Tilarna senses some magical entity, and the two witness a man stabbing a Mexican gang member before turning a gun on them.
2	"Dragnet Mirage"	July 15, 2019
Kei and Tilarna have trouble keeping the attacker down before Tilarna slices the enemy with her sword. Kei chastises her for killing the attacker instead of keeping it alive for questioning, but Tilarna answers that it was controlled by "mildey," magic that turned the body into a lifeless puppet. The dead bodies are later transported to the coroner, Cecil, who confirms Tilarna's analysis they were dead yet able to move. Tilarna says she can smell "evil latena" from the corpse. The captured fairy from before was used to make a "fairy dust" drug the men ingested before being turned into lifeless puppets. Kei reluctantly lets Tilarna stay at his home, where she learns he has been keeping a cat despite being allergic to it because he felt guilty for the cat getting injured while he chased a suspect. Meanwhile, an elf named Elbaji meets a terrorist named Kareem to demonstrate the power of a prototype "fairy bomb" that can instantly turn people into puppet corpses. After attending Rick's funeral, Kei and Tilarna are sidetracked when they learn of two police corpses in a nearby river. Tilarna confirms fairy dust on the bodies, and claims that for such a high concentration they would need gold to act as a catalyst, but it has to be sculpted in a precise manner that is difficult for most craftsmen. Kei decides to look for anyone who has recently purchased precise manufacturing equipment, and finds a club owner named Dennis Elbaji has done so through a shell company. Despite Kei's warnings about building a solid legal case, Tilarna decides to go after Elbaji herself, leaving Kei behind with her sword.
3	"Midnight Train"	July 22, 2019
Kei discovers that Tilarna left her sword behind to symbolize her willingness to break the rules and track down Dennis Elbaji. Tilarna infiltrates Dennis's nightclub with Biz's help, then meets Dennis himself, intending to take back the kidnapped fairy. However, Dennis beats her after a quick swordfight and kidnaps her instead, taking her to an abandoned temple in the outskirts of San-Teresa. Kei stakes out the area from afar, but when Tilarna uses magic to escape, Kei ignores his orders to wait for a SWAT team and runs in by himself. Tilarna enters a room in the burning temple to find it stocked with hundreds of fairies being used to create fairy dust. Dennis rants about how he enjoys the "American Dream" of Earth as opposed to the noble life he was expected to lead in their homeworld, then begins swordfighting Tilarna again. Suddenly, Kei rushes in and tosses Tilarna her trusted sword, letting her overpower Dennis and deliver a killing blow. However, Tilarna senses the original fairy is not the one Dennis held, and goes with Kei to find her. Kei quickly spots the wizard Zelada and cuffs him before he can escape, when Jack Roth appears and shoots Tilarna before holding Kei at gunpoint. Jack helps Zelada escape and reveals that he was the mole quietly helping Zelada in order to spark a war between the humans and Semanians using the fairy bomb. Before he shoots Kei, Tilarna rises up, giving Kei a split second to shoot Jack in the chest. Tilarna reveals that Jack's bullet hit her sword's guard as Jack commandeers a car to take them back to the city. The two head to a high-rise building called Forest Tower, dodging Zelada's traps, when Tilarna spots the fairy on the roof inside a ticking time bomb.
4	"In The Air Tonight"	July 29, 2019
Kei attempts to defuse the fairy bomb but is fatally struck by Zelada's magic. Kei uses his own senses to pinpoint Zelada's location and shoot him, exposing his true location to Tilarna, who cuts off his arm before he escapes. With the bomb about to explode and Kei dying on the roof, the fairy decides to use sacrificial magic to kill herself and help Tilarna heal Kei before the bomb explodes. As the bomb needed a living fairy to work, the psychic explosion didn't happen. After the incident, Tilarna heads home and Kei returns to his life, but some time later Tilarna appears in his house to announce the San-Teresa MPD hired her as a Detective so she can track Zelada and other criminals. On their first raid together, Tilarna cuts off the trigger finger of a suspect as they storm a house and Kei gets chewed out by the new Chief for her actions. After the suspects are arrested, the police discover a coffin with a mummified Semanian woman in their garage, and take it to Cecil for examination. While Tilarna brutally interrogates one of the suspects, he confesses he robbed the coffin from a certain graveyard, thinking he could get much money by selling it. Tilarna rushes to the medical examiner's office while Cecil discovers her assistant having his blood sucked out by the supposedly dead woman. Tilarna fights the regenerated woman, calling her a "vampire."
5	"Lonesome Vampire"	August 5, 2019
Tilarna and Kei manage to save Cecil and cut the vampire's arm off, but she escapes into the city. The police deploy K-9 units and SWAT teams to hunt her down while the new Chief Inspector defends Tilarna against an angry superintendent. Tilarna and Kei follow her trail to a closed shopping mall, when the vampire strikes again, throwing Kei into a fountain a couple floors down and knocking out Tilarna. Tilarna is held hostage by the vampire, who wants to know what world she has awakened into, wondering if it's connected to a gate mentioned in the "Book of Niba." As the vampire prepares to bite Tilarna, Kei bursts in with a SWAT team and IR goggles, riddling the vampire with bullets. The vampire barely escapes the scene with the help of a distant Zelada, who uses his magic to direct her to an underground passage, hoping to get the Book of Niba from her in exchange for saving her. The vampire refuses, instead draining the blood of the salaryman Zelada spoke through to regenerate herself. Kei and Tilarna track her down again in a subway tunnel, and Kei shoots her multiple times, but can't finish her off. Kei is pinned down by the vampire as a train is about to run them both over, when Tilarna manages to get Kei free just as the train runs over the vampire, the light of the highbeams and the weight of the vehicle both ensuring she can't regenerate.
6	"Need For Speed"	August 12, 2019
After a speeding truck clips Kei's car, Kei chases down the truck only to find the driver missing and a ton of porn mags spilled onto the road. Tilarna moves Kei's car but accidentally leaves it in the path of a different truck, resulting in the car being destroyed. The chief orders Kei to find out who stole the truck full of porn mags and Tilarna to get a driver's license. Kei ropes in a couple other vice detectives to make the bust on the porn smuggler while Tilarna is exposed to porn for the first time. Detective Tony McBee puts on a disguise and heads to Biz's club with his partner to meet the smuggler, a young Semanian named Gavin, hoping to make money by fencing the porn mags to Semanian nobles who don't have the technology to mass-produce porn in their world. Later, Kei receives a red sportscar from the chief while Tilarna practices driving with Cecil. The next day, Tony sets up to bust Gavin, but Gavin's partner betrays them both and holds Tony hostage as Kei gets blinded by a muzzle flash. As the suspect escapes, Tilarna tosses Kei into his new car and takes the driver's seat for herself, chasing down the suspect's car by crashing into it. Later that night, Kei comes home to find Tilarna has redecorated a whole room of his house for herself.
7	"Girls On Ice"	August 19, 2019
The San-Teresa MPD perform a sting on a local prostitution ring with Tilarna acting as bait. One of the suspects arrested turns out to be Cole Mozeleemay, a Semanian man running for Mayor of San-Teresa. The next day, Tilarna heads outside and runs into Zoe, one of the girls from the ring who was released on bail. Tilarna is roped into helping Zoe move when she finds out that Zoe is a skilled photographer who dreams of opening her own exhibition some day. Later that night, Kei picks up Tilarna, warning her not to get too involved with Zoe as she might react negatively if she discovers Tilarna is a cop. However, Tilarna disregards his warning, splitting time between her police duties and hanging out with Zoe. Later, a fake list of customers gets leaked to the press, threatening the prosecutor's case, while Cole meets with Zoe to try and find the real list before the police. Tilarna finds out that Zoe was the last person to access the list, and goes to confront her in person, revealing she was a cop. Zoe states she is disgusted with Tilarna, even though she didn't mean to lie to her, only for Zoe to be shot by a hitman, who Kei then shoots. While Cole suspects his wife of setting up the hit to clear his name, Tilarna considers going after Cole herself as she receives news Zoe died on the operating table.
8	"Smells Like Toon Spirits"	August 26, 2019
Tilarna takes down an escaping plane with her sword, as it collapses into pieces in a nearby swamp shortly after takeoff. The police are unable to find the plane, but discover a crate full of several objects. Kei tasks Tilarna to catalogue the items from the crate for tomorrow, but the cat Kuroi trips over a tiny crossbow, firing a bolt that pierces Tilarna's arm. Kei wakes up to find both Tilarna and Kuroi acting odd, and leaves for the police station himself. Tilarna finds herself trapped in Kuroi's body, and vice versa, due to some magic in the crossbow. However, Kei accidentally tosses the crossbow out with the trash. Tilarna manages to text Cecil to come over to help her recover the crossbow before the trash gets carried away, but Kuroi accidentally knocks Cecil out while in Tilarna's body. Elsewhere, Kei gets chewed out by a CBP agent named Hellmandes for missing one of the artifacts from the plane, and he tries to get more information from Biz about the cargo. Cecil wakes up to find the dumpster empty, and tries to track down the garbage truck herself.
9	"A King Maker"	September 2, 2019
While Kei tries to get info from a sick Biz about Hellmandes, Cecil and Tilarna head to the city's sanitation department but are too late to stop the garbage from being dumped. Tilarna jumps into the trash and tracks down the crossbow, but it gets destroyed in a trash compactor as Tilarna jumps out at the last moment. Suddenly, Tilarna wakes up in her own body as Hellmandes is beating her for info about the crossbow. She easily beats him and nearly kills him until Kei appears to arrest him instead. Later, Chief Zimmer hosts a cookout at his home with other members of the vice squad. Suddenly, news breaks that a candidate for Mayor named Kahns was shot by a Semanian with no criminal record. The Chief suspects that Zelada is involved, and orders Kei and Tilarna to head to the coroner's office, where Tilarna confirms the smell of latena on the corpse. On their way out, Kei confronts another officer who makes a racist remark at Tilarna. Back at Zimmer's house, Tilarna tries to think who would have the most to gain from Kahns death.
9.5	"Special Episode: Beautiful Knight! Pursue the Captured Fairy!"; Transliteration: "Tokubetsuhen：Utsukushiki jo kishi！Toraware no yōsei o oe！" (Japanese: 特別編：美しき女騎士！とらわれの妖精を追え！)	September 9, 2019
Recap of Episodes 1 to 4.
10	"Cock Robin, John Doe"	September 16, 2019
Kei goes to interview Cole as a person of interest in Kahns' death, but Cole and his wife don't give Kei any good answers. Suddenly, Cole is shot by a Semanian man after going on stage to speak at a campaign rally. Kei and Tilarna chase the suspect down and Tilarna cuts off his arm, killing him. However, Tilarna finds that the man was actually a human who used magic to change both his face and the weapon he used to shoot Cole. Before Kei can find any more clues, the FBI takes control of the scene and pushes him aside. Later, the police receive word that Cole died in the hospital. Tilarna tries to explain to the rest of the vice squad what "vaifaht steel" is and how it was used to kill Cole. Kei prepares to interview Tourte, the last remaining mayoral candidate, as his supporters chant racist slogans nearby.
11	"Transitional Crises"	September 23, 2019
Cole's assassination sparks riots across the town. Kei and Tilarna interviews Tourte about his possible involvement in the recent murders, but Kei comes away unconvinced that Tourte was behind the attacks. Meanwhile, the vice squad tries to chase down a lead about Cole's assailant, and find out that he was a former U.S. Marine with a bulldog tattoo. As Kei and Tilarna head home, Kei mentions that Tilarna has caused himself and his friends to soften their stance on Semanians. The two find out that Cole's wife, Marla, has entered the mayoral race in his place. Tilarna suspects Marla was the one who ordered the recent murders, but has no proof. The next day, Kei gets a panicked call from a reporter and agrees to meet him in a park. The reporter gives him a printed photo showing Marla meeting with the shooter in a hotel room before Cole was killed. Suddenly, Kei, Tilarna, and the reporter are surrounded by FBI agents. As the three are taken away, Tilarna notes that all of the agents except Ronald Chan are being controlled by magic. Kei and Tilarna are thrown in the back of a van, where Zelada sits in the driver's seat.
12	"Two Worlds, Two Justices"	September 30, 2019
Kei and Tilarna are kidnapped and taken to an apartment building. Tilarna awakens in a penthouse suite, where Zelada tells her about his renewed plan to spark a race war between the Semanians and humans, with Ronald taking the role that Jack previously held. Meanwhile, Kei is being interrogated by Ronald in the basement, as Ronald tries to get Kei's smartphone key so he can obtain the only other copy of the incriminating photo of Marla before the election. Kei manages to snap Ronald's neck with his legs, then fights his way through Zelada's puppets to the penthouse suite, intervening just before Zelada can kill Tilarna. Kei and Tilarna work together and soon Kei cuts off Zelada's head with a sword. While waiting for backup to arrive, Kei asks Tilarna if he should turn in the photo as evidence, knowing it would lead to Marla's arrest and probably hand Tourte the election. Tilarna decides to do so, believing in the people of the city as she stays attached to the San-Teresa MPD.
