= Amagi Brilliant Park =

Japanese light novel franchise

- First light novel volume cover, featuring Seiya Kanie, Moffle and Isuzu Sento

甘城ブリリアントパーク (Amagi Buririanto Pāku)
- Genre: Reverse isekai; Romantic comedy
- Light novel
- Written by: Shoji Gatoh
- Illustrated by: Yuka Nakajima
- Published by: Fujimi Shobo
- English publisher: NA: J-Novel Club
- Imprint: Fujimi Fantasia Bunko
- Original run: February 20, 2013 – June 18, 2016
- Volumes: 8
- Light novel

Amagi Brilliant Park: Maple Summoner
- Written by: Keishō Yanagawa
- Illustrated by: Yuka Nakajima
- Published by: Fujimi Shobo
- Imprint: Fujimi Fantasia Bunko
- Original run: October 18, 2014 – February 20, 2015
- Volumes: 3
- Manga
- Written by: Shoji Gatoh
- Illustrated by: Kimitake Yoshioka
- Published by: Fujimi Shobo
- Magazine: Monthly Dragon Age
- Original run: February 8, 2014 – September 9, 2016
- Volumes: 6
- Manga

Amagi Brilliant Park? Fumo
- Written by: Shoji Gatoh
- Illustrated by: Kōji Azuma
- Published by: Fujimi Shobo
- Magazine: Monthly Dragon Age (June 2014 – November 2015 issues); Dragon Magazine (July 2014 – September 2015 issues)
- Original run: May 9, 2014 – October 9, 2015
- Volumes: 2
- Anime television series
- Directed by: Yasuhiro Takemoto
- Produced by: Shinji Horikiri; Shunsuke Matsumura; Tomohito Nagase; Yoshihisa Nakayama; Yuichi Yamada
- Written by: Fumihiko Shimo
- Music by: Shinkichi Mitsumune
- Studio: Kyoto Animation
- Licensed by: AUS: Madman Entertainment; NA: Sentai Filmworks; UK: Manga Entertainment
- Original network: JNN (TBS, TBC, RKB, MBS, CBC, BS-TBS, TUT)
- Original run: October 6, 2014 – December 25, 2014
- Episodes: 13 + OVA
- Manga

Amagi Brilliant Park the animation
- Written by: AmaBri Restoration Committee
- Illustrated by: Ami Hakui
- Published by: Kadokawa
- Magazine: ComicWalker
- Original run: 2014 – 2015
- Volumes: 3
- icon

Amagi Brilliant Park (Japanese: 甘城ブリリアントパーク, Hepburn: Amagi Buririanto Pāku) is a Japanese light novel series written by Shoji Gatoh and illustrated by Yuka Nakajima. Fujimi Shobo has published eight volumes since February 20, 2013, under their Fujimi Fantasia Bunko imprint. There are three manga adaptations published by Fujimi Shobo and Kadokawa. The series follows a young man named Seiya Kanie, a smart and extremely narcissistic high school pupil, who has only three months to save a struggling and magical amusement park from being sold for land redevelopment, with the help of his friend, Isuzu Sento and theme park owner Princess Latifa Fleuranza.

A 13-episode anime television series adaptation by Kyoto Animation aired in Japan between October 6 and December 25, 2014. In North America, the series is licensed by J-Novel Club for light novels, with the first volume released digitally on September 9, 2018, and Sentai Filmworks has also licensed the anime series for home video distribution and is streaming on its Hidive platform.

By November 2014, the light novel has over 100,000 copies in circulation.

== Plot ==
Seiya Kanie is a good-looking, perfectionist boy who is forced by the mysterious Isuzu Sento to visit an amusement park named Amagi Brilliant Park, which is in serious financial trouble and about to be closed forever. The park is actually staffed by refugees from a magical realm called Maple Land and the park is a facility for harvesting magical energy from visitors while they're having fun. As such, the park is the only way the refugees can maintain their existence in the human realm.

To save the park from closing, Seiya is hired by the owner, Latifah Fleuranza, the princess of Maple Land (whom Seiya met before when he was a young boy), to become its new manager and use his skills in entertainment to save it. However, they have only two weeks to attract 100,000 visitors (they have to attract 250,000 visitors in three months in the anime version), a feat that seems impossible given the park's current situation.

== Characters ==
=== Amagi management ===
Seiya Kanie (可児江 西也, Kanie Seiya)
Voiced by: Koki Uchiyama (Japanese); Adam Gibbs (English)
Seiya is a perfectionist high school student who is extremely intelligent, has excellent reflexes, and acts like a prince to the point of being a narcissist which annoys people. As a child, he was involved in the entertainment industry and his stage name was Seiya Kodama. According to Isuzu, he was a child who would have made any parent proud. However, Seiya has told her that persona died a long time ago. Latifah grants him the magical power of listening to a person's heart, although it only works once with each person. After some time, he opens up to the park's workers, especially Isuzu, with whom he shares his fears and insecurities, which encourages Isuzu when she was disappointed in herself. He once met Latifah when he was a kid, but he didn't remember until he found out about her curse. His name originates from Kanye West.
Isuzu Sento (千斗 いすず, Sento Isuzu)
Voiced by: Ai Kakuma (Japanese); Molly Searcy (English)
A royal guard who forces Seiya (at gunpoint) to go on a "date" with her to Amagi Brilliant Park. She has a stoic personality, rarely showing emotion. Despite that facade, she is also very sensitive. She managed Amagi Brilliant Park before Seiya's arrival, but she was a poor manager due to her upbringing as a royal guard and her fearsome reputation among the staff. Once Seiya takes over as manager, Isuzu serves as his secretary. After meeting Seiya, her personality slowly changes and she eventually develops feelings for him but refuses to tell him. Isuzu carries a magical muzzleloader named Steinberger that has been magically infused into her body, so she can summon it from any exposed skin. With it she fires bullets with different effects such as removing the target's memory or simply causing a lot of pain. Her name originates from 50 Cent.
Latifah Fleuranza (ラティファ・フルーランザ, Ratifa Furūranza)
Voiced by: Yukiyo Fujii (Japanese); Cindy Lou Parker (English)
The princess of Maple Land. She gives Seiya some of her magical powers by kissing him. According to Triken, she is Moffle's niece and bears a striking resemblance to his sister. Due to her frail body as well as other circumstances, she cannot leave her garden, which is surrounded by a magic barrier. In the light novel, Latifah is blind. It is later revealed that a wizard cursed her, making her body deficient in Animus, Maple Land's life force. The curse renews each year, resetting her memory and age, meaning she has lived as a 14-year-old for more than a decade. It is heavily implied that she also has feelings for Seiya. Her name originates from Queen Latifah.

=== Amagi Brilliant Park cast ===
==== Mascots ====
Moffle (モッフル, Moffuru)
Voiced by: Ayako Kawasumi (Japanese); Tiffany Grant (English)
A mouse-like sweets fairy who is Amagi Brilliant Park's main mascot, who takes a mutual dislike towards Seiya. He is Latifah's uncle and is very protective of her. He hates being called a knockoff of Bonta, resembling the fictional mascot of the Full Metal Panic? Fumoffu series (animated at the same studio, Kyoto Animation, and based on a light novel by the same author, Shoji Gatoh). It is hinted, albeit indirectly, that Moffle hates Latifah's father due to his marriage to Moffle's beloved sister and that Latifah was merely left in his care.
Macaron (マカロン, Makaron)
Voiced by: Ryoko Shiraishi (Japanese); Allison Keith-Shipp (English)
A sheep-like magic fairy who is one of the park's mascots, a short tempered artist who often takes time off work if he is not feeling inspired. He plays the violin. He's divorced and fighting for the custody of his daughter.
Tiramy (ティラミー, Tiramī)
Voiced by: Ai Nonaka (Japanese); Jessica Calvello (English)
A pink cat-like flower fairy who is a flirty pervert with a keen eye for young women and bewitching older women and well-versed in explosives.
Wanipee (ワニピー, Wanipī)
Voiced by: Takuma Terashima (Japanese); Clint Bickham (English)
A fairy in the form of a blue crocodile who is one of the park's mascots, though he barely has a fanbase compared to the other Mascots.
Dornell (ドルネル, Doruneru)
Voiced by: Satoshi Hino (Japanese); David Wald (English)
A ferret-like flower fairy who was assumed dead by the others after ending up trapped in the "Ruby's Trial by Fire" attraction looking for a treasure ten years prior, becoming a shut-in otaku who spends his time watching anime and playing online games. When the group venture learns the truth while attempting to get the treasure, they sold off Dornell's collection to get the money needed to maintain the park.
Jaw (ジョー, Jō)
Voiced by: Shin-ichiro Miki (Japanese); John Gremillion (English)
A shark-like fairy who works the machine room. He becomes a terrifying life-like version of himself when he comes into contact with water; an ability he himself was not aware of until Seiya showed him his reflection in a mirror, much to his shock. He later becomes Tetsuhige's supervisor and uses the pirate's sharkphobia to keep him and his crew in line.

==== Elementario ====
Muse (ミュース, Myūsu)
Voiced by: Yūka Aisaka (Japanese); Emily Neves (English)
The fairy of water and the leader of the fairies of Elementario. Muse has a very energetic and cheerful personality and she is often seen with a smile on her face. Despite the lack of popularity of the Elementario, she still works hard. Of the four fairies, she is the best at singing.
Sylphy (シルフィー, Shirufī)
Voiced by: Tomoyo Kurosawa (Japanese); Luci Christian (English)
The fairy of wind of the fairies of Elementario. She is an airhead, but also the best at performing of the four. She sometimes speaks random Chinese sayings.
Kobory (コボリー, Koborī)
Voiced by: Shiori Mikami (Japanese); Juliet Simmons (English)
The fairy of earth of the fairies of Elementario. She usually has a stoic demeanor and has shown interest in yaoi. She is shown to be a complete klutz.
Salama (サーラマ, Sārama)
Voiced by: Minami Tsuda (Japanese); Allison Sumrall (English)
The fairy of fire of the fairies of Elementario, who usually has a lazy and unmotivated personality when it comes to performing at the park. She seems to enjoy being on her phone when she is not performing and apparently engages in flaming wars.

==== Other members ====
Triken (トリケン, Toriken)
Voiced by: Jun Fukuyama (Japanese); Mark Laskowski (English)
A fairy in the form of a yellow triceratops with glasses and a perverted personality. He is in charge of sales and advertising.
Ashe (アーシェ, Āshe)
Voiced by: Shiori Mikami (Japanese); Kelly Manison (English)
The head accountant of Amagi Brilliant Park.
Wrench (レンチ, Renchi)
Voiced by: Tetsu Inada (Japanese); Rob Mungle (English)
A fairy with the form of a wrench. He is the chief of engineering.
Ōkuro (オークロ, Ōkuro)
Voiced by: Shinya Takahashi (Japanese); Ty Mahany (English)
The chief of security of Amagi Brilliant Park. A regular human who wears a wrestler mask.
Nick (ニック, Nikku)
Voiced by: Seiichiro Yamashita (Japanese); Luis Galindo (English)
A fairy with the form of several types of meat, who is the head of catering.
Genjūrō (ゲンジュウロウ)
Voiced by: Jun Fukuyama (Japanese); David Matranga (English)
A fairy in the form of a dolphin wearing samurai gear in charge of the Splash Ocean attraction.
Rubrum the Red Dragon (赤龍ルブルム, Sekiryū Ruburumu)
Voiced by: Jouji Nakata (Japanese); Josh Morrison (English)
A huge red dragon that lived in the abandoned "Ruby's Trial by Fire" attraction at the park, but later he was re-hired to work on another attraction. Despite his size and appearance, he's quite a crybaby, and not very good at flying, but works hard nonetheless.
Taramo (タラモ)
Voiced by: Nobuyuki Hiyama (Japanese); Greg Ayres (English)
The leader of the Diggeries, a group of mole-like fairies who were being persecuted by a tyrannical empire, so they were given shelter in the park. After finding out said empire was no more, they gleefully accept to work at the park.
Eiko Adachi (安達 映子, Adachi Eiko)
Voiced by: Hiromi Igarashi (Japanese); Shenae'a Moore (English)
A girl with a kind demeanor who used to work in AV (animal videos) and is hired in order to compensate for the lack of staff by Seiya. She is capable of understanding what the mascots are saying when they are not speaking.
Biino Bandō (伴藤 美衣乃, Bandō Biino)
Voiced by: Natsumi Takamori (Japanese); Natalie Rial (English)
Another girl who is also hired in order to compensate the lack of staff by Seiya, but showed up at the interview after being stabbed by her brother, simply because, he refuses to let his younger sister go to work. She works in the shaved ice stand near the pool area.
Shiina Chūjō (中城 椎菜, Chūjō Shiina)
Voiced by: Haruka Chisuga (Japanese); Brittney Karbowski (English)
A shy and timid girl coming from Amagi High, a year younger than Isuzu and Kanie, who is the last person hired in order to compensate for the lack of staff by Seiya. She works with Jaw in the machine room. She seems to have a crush on Kanie.
Tetsuhige (鉄ひげ; lit. Ironbeard)
Voiced by: Masahiko Tanaka (Japanese); John Swasey (English)
A pirate from Maple Land with the form of an elephant seal with an iron mustache. He and his crew of pirate seals appeared at the Splash Ocean attraction when a magic portal opened there and took Latifah, the customers and the cast as hostages. After being defeated, he and his crew are forced to work at the park in order to pay for the damages under the supervision of Jaw (as they are terrified of sharks). He later warms up to the idea of being an entertainer and even begins to enjoy his role to entertain children.

=== Other characters ===
Takaya Kurisu (栗栖 隆也, Kurisu Takaya)
Voiced by: Junichi Suwabe (Japanese); Jay Hickman (English)
Takaya is the wizard who defeated a powerful dragon under orders of the king of Maple Land with the promise of gaining Latifah's hand in return, but when the king refused to fulfill his part of the bargain, he placed a curse on the princess, leading to her current condition. He later appears disguised as an employee of Amagi Development, a company that wishes to acquire Amagi Brilliant Park. He is named after Chris Tucker.
Aisu Kyūbu (久武 藍珠, Kyūbu Aisu)
Voiced by: Yūko Kaida (Japanese); Katelyn Barr (English)
Seiya's aunt and guardian. Despite usually slacking off, she deeply cares about her nephew; she is named after Ice Cube.
Takami (タカミ, Takami)
Voiced by: Sakura Nakamura (Japanese); Cara Duncan (English)
A waitress working at the restaurant "Savage" that is frequented by Moffle, Macaron and Tirami.
Mutsumi Terano (寺野 睦美, Terano Mutsumi)
Voiced by: Mikako Izawa (Japanese); Chelsea Ryan McCurdy (English)
Classmate of Tsuchida who accuses Kanie (actually the mascots) of playing Tsuchida's affections.
Kanae Tsuchida (土田 香苗, Tsuchida Kanae)
Voiced by: Moe Ōtomo (Japanese); Robin Nennig (English)
Girlfriend of Kimura and classmate of Terano. She intended to send a love letter to Kimura but accidentally sent it to Seiya.
Kimura (木村, Kimura)
Voiced by: Daisuke Sakaguchi (Japanese); Greg Ayres (English)
Boyfriend of Kanae Tsuchida.

== Media ==
=== Light novels ===
Written by Shoji Gatoh, with illustrations by Yuka Nakajima, Yuka Nakajima was published in eight volumes by Fujimi Shobo under its Fujimi Fantasia Bunko imprint from February 20, 2013, to June 18, 2016. During their panel at Anime Expo 2018, J-Novel Club announced that they have licensed the series. The eight volumes were released digitally from September 9, 2018, to November 25, 2019.

A three-volume spin-off light novel series written by Keishō Yanagawa, titled Amagi Brilliant Park: Maple Summoner, was published by Fujimi Fantasia Bunko from October 18, 2014, to February 20, 2015.

No.	Original release date	Original ISBN	English release date	English ISBN
1	February 20, 2013	978-4-8291-3828-1	September 9, 2018	—
2	August 20, 2013	978-4-8291-3921-9	November 11, 2018	—
3	January 18, 2014	978-4-04-070004-5	January 13, 2019	—
4	June 20, 2014	978-4-04-070207-0	January 31, 2019	—
5	October 18, 2014	978-4-04-070208-7	May 18, 2019	—
6	April 18, 2015	978-4-04-070209-4	July 21, 2019	—
7	October 20, 2015	978-4-04-070701-3	September 17, 2019	—
8	June 18, 2016	978-4-04-070702-0	November 25, 2019	—

=== Manga ===
A manga adaptation with art by Kimitake Yoshioka started serialization in Fujimi Shobo's shōnen manga magazine Monthly Dragon Age with the March 2014 issue sold on February 8. The series has been compiled in two tankōbon volumes, released on June 7 and October 8, 2014. A four-panel comic strip manga illustrated by Kōji Azuma titled Amagi Brilliant Park? Fumo (甘城ブリリアントパーク?ふも) began serialization in Monthly Dragon Age with the June 2014 issue. A third manga titled Amagi Brilliant Park the animation (甘城ブリリアントパークthe animation), written by the AmaBri Restoration Committee (甘ブリ再生委員会, Amaburi Saisei Iinkai) and illustrated by Ami Hakui, will begin serialization on Kadokawa's ComicWalker website.

=== Anime ===
A 13-episode anime television series adaptation produced by Kyoto Animation and directed by Yasuhiro Takemoto, with Fumihiko Shimo handling series composition, Miku Kadowaki designing the characters and Shinkichi Mitsumune composing the music. The series aired from October 6 to December 25, 2014. The opening theme is "Extra Magic Hour" (エクストラ・マジック・アワー, Ekusutora Majikku Awā), performed by Akino with bless4. Akino and bless4 also did an English version of this song titled "Extra Magic Hour (International Edition)". The ending theme is "Elementalio de Aimashō!" (エレメンタリオで会いましょう!, Erementario de Aimashō!), performed by Brilliant4, a voice actress unit composed of Yuka Aisaka, Tomoyo Kurosawa, Shiori Mikami, and Minami Tsuda. Additionally, there is an original video animation episode bundled with the seventh volume of the DVD and Blu-ray discs, and seven mini-episode side stories titled Amagi Brilliant Park: Wakuwaku Mini Theater - Rakugaki Backstage that were also bundled with the DVD and Blu-ray volumes.

Sentai Filmworks has licensed the series in North America and the series in both Japanese and English dubs were released on home video in Blu-ray on February 28, 2017, with the series streamed on HIDIVE. Crunchyroll had previously streamed the series in North America in 2015. Following the acquisition of Crunchyroll by Sony Pictures Television, the parent company of Funimation in 2021, Amagi Brilliant Park, among several Sentai titles, was dropped from the service on March 31, 2022. The series was also distributed for home video in Australia by Madman Entertainment and in the United Kingdom by Manga Entertainment.

No.	Title	Directed by	Written by	Original release date
1	"Not Enough Visitors!" "Okyaku ga Konai!" (Japanese: お客が来ない!)	Yasuhiro Takemoto	Fumihiko Shimo	October 6, 2014
Isuzu Sento forces Seiya Kanie, at gunpoint, to go on a date with her. The location turns out to be Amagi Brilliant Park. While roaming around the place, Isuzu introduces Seiya to the various attractions, and it is very apparent that all of them are very unsatisfactory. After going once over the Park, Isuzu asks Seiya to his thoughts about the place, to which he responds very negatively, finally spouting "You need to believe in a dream yourself for other people to believe in it!". Just when he's about to leave, Isuzu offers him some croquettes, which turn out to be very delicious. Deciding to know who made them, Seiya follows Isuzu to meet the manager of the Park, who is dressed like a princess, Latifah Fullanza. She describes that the Park actors are actually residents from the magical kingdom of Maple Land, and if they are not able to get 500,000 customers before July 31st, the park will be shut down. If the park should ever get shut down, everyone who works in it as well as the entire Maple Land kingdom itself will cease to exist forever. Fearing for what may happen, she asks Seiya for his help by taking over the manager position. In addition for his help, she also tells him that she will give him magical powers by simply kissing him. Seiya has some visions upon being kissed before he passed out unconscious. The next morning, Seiya could suddenly start hearing thoughts from his aunt.
2	"Not Enough Time!" "Jikan ga Nai!" (Japanese: 時間がない!)	Haruka Fujita	Fumihiko Shimo	October 9, 2014
The next day, Seiya realizes he has the power to read people's minds. Isuzu again takes him to the park, where they proceed to meet some people from the Amagi Development - they are the ones who would take over the Park once the time expires. One of them recognized Seiya and tells him not to get close to the losers in the Park, or he too will become one. In the Park, an assembly is held, where the Princess, Latifah Fullanza announces that the Park will be closed in three months. Seiya returns to them and announces that he will save them. But later, when he's alone with Isuzu and Latifah, he says that he just claimed it to raise everyone's spirit, but he's not actually confident about it - but Latifah claims having complete faith in him.
3	"Not Enough Reinforcement!" "Tekoire ga Kikanai!" (Japanese: テコ入れが効かない!)	Tatsuya Ishihara	Yasuhiro Takemoto	October 16, 2014
Seiya makes an announcement for cast workers saying that park will be closed for a day due to repairing. Then he declares three changes: the park will close at 7 p.m., cancel Friday's day-off and set up a 30 yen payment for all services. When Moffle hits an annoying guest, Isuzu shoots the guest and his family with bullets which causes memory loss. Salama records the fight with her cell phone. Seiya records a promotional video with the Elementario fairies, Latifa and Isuzu wearing swimsuits, but it does not get as many views as expected. Then he uploads an edited video of the fight, which gets many hits, and as a result gave many views to the PV uploaded beforehand.
4	"Not Enough PA Productivity!" "Hisho ga Tsukaenai!" (Japanese: 秘書が使えない!)	Taichi Ogawa	Shoji Gatoh	October 23, 2014
Thanks to Seiya's flawless management, the park's efficiency and visitor count is increasing, and when informed by Isuzu that Moffle, Macaron and Tirami have some complaints, he decides to let her deal with them instead, but the Elementario Faeries show him that instead of looking for a compromise, Isuzu just ends the discussion by threatening them with her gun. Seiya then scolds Isuzu for her behavior, creating a divide between them. In the next day, Latifah asks Seiya to ride the ferris wheel with her and in the occasion, it is revealed that he has a fear of heights, and when comforted by her, Seiya has the feeling that they have met before. Some time later, it starts raining, and with the drainage system broken, threatening to flood the entire park, Isuzu takes the lead and organizes an emergency operation to prevent further damage. After the rain, Isuzu reveals that her strict behavior to others is thanks to her military training, and believes that everyone in the park hates her because of that, but Seiya shows her the happy faces of the cast who thank her for her help, proving her wrong.
5	"Not Enough Money!" "Okane ga Tarinai!" (Japanese: お金が足りない!)	Takuya Yamamura	Chika Ishikawa	October 30, 2014
The Amagi Brilliant Park has used all its savings and there is no money left to keep it running. However, Moffle remembers about their friend Dornel, who went missing after searching for treasure in an abandoned area of the park, and Seiya, Isuzu, Macaron, Tiramy and Moffle leave to investigate. While facing several traps along the way, Isuzu and Macaron get separated from the others and discover that Dornel was hidden inside the cave all this time, indulging on several hobbies, while Seiya and the others confront Rubrum, the Red Dragon, and learn that Rubrum and the Diggeries, a group of mole-like fairies were running away from a tyrannical empire and given shelter in the park. Back to the surface, Rubrum and the Diggeries ask for a job in the park as well, and Seiya agrees, while all the items Dornel gathered during his absence are sold to pay for the park's expenses.
6	"Not Enough People!" "Hitode ga Tarinai!" (Japanese: 人手が足りない!)	Noriyuki Kitanohara	Maiko Nishioka	November 6, 2014
With the park short on staff, Seiya decides to hold a job interview for new workers and Isuzu gets herself in serious trouble when she unwillingly eats a fruit that forces her to always tell her mind, leaving her in fear of revealing her true feelings for him. Her troubles are worsened when three of the female applicants are the ones she sees in her dream the previous night causing her to think that they will either seduce Seiya or replace her as his assistant and secretary.
7	"Not Enough Pool Safety!" "Pūru ga Abunai!" (Japanese: プールが危ない!)	Ai Yukimura	Yasuhiro Takemoto	November 13, 2014
The park is on alert when a group of pirates from Maple Land appear to wreak havoc. With Isusu, Latifah, Moffle, Macaron and the Elementario Fairies in their custody, it is up to Seiya and the others to make a stand against the pirates and rescue them, all without having the guests realize that it is not an act.
8	"Not Enough Love!" "Koigokoro ga Todokanai!" (Japanese: 恋心が届かない!)	Haruka Fujita	Fumihiko Shimo	November 20, 2014
Seiya gets a summer cold but he can't afford to skip school due to his earlier absences. Sento, Macaron, Tiramie and Moffle wear a realistic suit of his body one person per day and attend school in his stead. On the first day, Isuzu finds a love letter in Kanie's shoe locker but the sender, Tsuchida Kanae, had only mixed up his locker with someone else. As Sento tells her inspiring words, Kanae ends up developing feelings for Kanie instead. The next two days end up with disgusting incidents due to the mascots' behavior, while the fourth day ends peacefully due to Kanie wearing a suit of a boy to whom Kanae had tried to send the letter originally, Kimura, and lying that all the disgusting acts from 'Kanie' the days before were meant to drive Kanae back to Kimura by making her hate Kanie.
9	"Not Enough Teamwork!" "Chīmuwāku ga Umarenai!" (Japanese: チームワークが生まれない!)	Eisaku Kawanami	Shoji Gatoh	November 27, 2014
Having not improved at all with their attraction due to their lack of teamwork, the Elementario Fairies are invited for dinner with Latifah and unwittingly activate the castle's defense system. Trapped inside the castle, the fairies must reinitialize the system from the inside, but to do so, they must pass a series of trials that demand them to work together.
10	"Nothing Can Be Done!" "Mō Utsu Te ga Nai!" (Japanese: もう打つ手がない!)	Taichi Ogawa	Maiko Nishioka	December 4, 2014
Everyone's doing their best but it seems impossible to reach the goal of 250.000 visitors. Isuzu tells Kanie why Latifah faints so often. It turns out that there's a Animus-draining curse upon the princess. Amagi Brilliant Park was built to keep Latifah alive. Seiya recalled the meeting with the princess when he was young, but she looked exactly the same then. Moffle told him that the curse not only affects her health, but also resets her memories and physical development every year. With only 10 days left to the deadline, Seiya hears from Triken that he found what he asked him to look for, renewing his hopes.
11	"Nothing to Worry About Now!" "Kore de Mō Shinpainai!" (Japanese: これでもう心配ない!)	Takuya Yamamura	Fumihiko Shimo	December 11, 2014
Seiya's plan to reach the quota in 10 days involves hosting a soccer match at the park's stadium. After convincing the local soccer team to play an important match at the park, Seiya informs the cast that for their plan to work, a large unused area of the park grounds must be sold in order to pay for the expenses and solve their financial problems, to which they agree, and then they spend the following days making preparations for the match, while Seiya is still worried, knowing that on the last day, Latifah's memories will be reset and she will forget about him once more. The final day comes at last, and with all the visitors counted and a few hours left to the deadline, Seiya gets in shock upon knowing that they are only 252 visitors short from reaching the goal.
12	"Nobody Knows What the Future Holds!" "Mirai wa Darenimo Wakaranai!" (Japanese: 未来は誰にもわからない!)	Noriyuki Kitanohara	Shoji Gatoh	December 18, 2014
As a last resort, the staff of Amagi Brilliant Park invite all their friends and relatives, reaching the quota in the nick of time. Announcing that it is his last day as manager, Seiya reveals to the others that a huge shopping mall will be established in the land he previously sold, which will help bring guests to the park. Takaya Kurisu from the Amagi Development, compliments Seiya for the feat, but also mocks him because the issue with Latifah's condition is yet to be solved, revealing himself as the wizard who cursed her in the first place before fleeing. However, when midnight comes, Seiya and the others discover that the huge quantity of Animus gathered in the last weeks was strong enough to break her free from the curse, much to everyone's joy. Seiya then bids farewell to the people of the park, but when he returns home, his aunt Aisu Kyūbu remarks how happy he was while working there, thus in the next day, Seiya returns and reassumes his post as the manager of Amagi Brilliant Park, claiming that there is still a lot for him to do.
13	"Not a Good PV!" "PV ga Tsumaranai!" (Japanese: PVがつまらない!)	Ai Yukimura	Fumihiko Shimo	December 25, 2014
Triken takes suggestions from the staff to make a promotional video for the park with dubious results.
OVA	"No Time to Take It Easy!" "Nonbirishiteiru Hima ga Nai!" (Japanese: のんびりしている暇がない!)	Noriyuki Kitanohara	Shoji Gatoh	June 26, 2015
It is Seiya's birthday and Isuzu plans to give him a birthday gift. However, a series of events that unfolds keeps thwarting her plans.
