= Masahiko Tanaka =

Japanese actor and voice actor (born 1954)

- 田中 正彦
- Born: October 1, 1954 (age 72); Osaka, Japan
- Occupations: Actor, voice actor
- Years active: 1977–present
- Known for: Attack on Titan as Dot Pixis; Initial D as Kyoichi Sudo; Pokémon 4Ever as Suicune
- Height: 177 cm (5 ft 10 in)
- Website: masahikotanaka.blog122.fc2.com

Masahiko Tanaka (田中 正彦, Tanaka Masahiko; born on October 1, 1954) is a Japanese actor and voice actor. He is known for voicing Gauron from Full Metal Panic!, Ryo Mashiba from Hajime no Ippo, and Kyoichi Sudo from Initial D.

== Filmography ==
=== TV animation ===
- Initial D (1998) (Kyoichi Sudo)
- The Candidate for Goddess (2000) (Headmaster)
- Hajime no Ippo (2000) (Ryo Mashiba)
- Digimon Tamers (2001) (Mihiramon)
- Shaman King (2001) (Ryu and Mohamed "Turbine" Tabarsi)
- Full Metal Panic! (2002) (Gauron)
- GetBackers (2002) (Fudou Takuma)
- Naruto (2003) (Rasa/The Fourth Kazekage)
- Stellvia (2003) (Carl Hutter)
- Monster (2004) (Dr. Boyer)
- Fafner in the Azure (2004) (Fumihiko Makabe)
- Black Lagoon (2006) (The Captain)
- Rin~Daughters of Mnemosyne (2008) (Tajimamori)
- Future Diary (2011) (Keigo Kurusu)
- Tiger & Bunny (2011) (Muramasa Kaburagi)
- Naruto Shippuden (2012) (Rasa/The Fourth Kazekage)
- Attack on Titan (2013) (Dot Pixis)
- Hajime no Ippo: Rising (2013) (Ryo Mashiba)
- Amagi Brilliant Park (2014) (Tetsuhige/Ironbeard)
- Fafner in the Azure: Exodus (2015) (Fumihiko Makabe)
- Drifters (2016) (Grigori Rasputin)
- Karakuri Circus (2018) (Shōji Saiga)
- Yashahime: Princess Half-Demon (2020) (Ogigayatsu Hiiragi Danjo)
- Shaman King (2021) (Ryunosuke Umemiya)
- Shaman King: Flowers (2024) (Ryunosuke Umemiya)
- Shinkalion: Change the World (2024) (Kaiji Hama)

=== OVA ===
- New Story of Aura Battler Dunbine (1988) (Shott Weapon)
- Legend of the Galactic Heroes (1994) (Sahm)

=== ONA ===
- Obsolete (2019) (Bowman)

=== Movie ===
- Mobile Suit Gundam special edition (2000) (M'Quve)
- Initial D Third Stage (2001) (Kyoichi Sudo)
- Pokémon 4Ever (2001) (Suicune)
- Fafner in the Azure: Heaven and Earth (2010) (Fumihiko Makabe)
- Rainbow Fireflies (2012) (Saeko's father)

=== Video games ===
- Dynasty Warriors: Gundam (2007) (M'Quve)
- Initial D Arcade Stage (2003–present) (Kyoichi Sudo)

=== Dubbing ===
==== Live-action ====
- Alec Baldwin
  - Looking for Richard (Clarence)
  - Notting Hill (Jeff King)
  - The Good Shepherd (Samuel Murach)
  - Mission: Impossible – Rogue Nation (Alan Hunley)
  - Paris Can Wait (Michael)
  - Mission: Impossible – Fallout (Alan Hunley)
- 12 Monkeys (Jose (Jon Seda))
- 1917 (Captain Smith (Mark Strong))
- The Adventures of Buckaroo Banzai Across the 8th Dimension (Perfect Tommy (Lewis Smith))
- Against the Dark (Cross (Linden Ashby))
- Alpha Dog (Sonny Truelove (Bruce Willis))
- The Art of War (Robert Bly (Michael Biehn))
- Black Dog (Vince (Cyril O'Reilly))
- The Bone Collector (Detective Howard Cheney (Michael Rooker))
- Burlesque (Vincent "Vince" Scali (Peter Gallagher))
- The Cell (Special Agent Gordon Ramsey (Jake Weber))
- Chaos (Detective Quentin Conners (Jason Statham))
- Chernobyl (Anatoly Dyatlov (Paul Ritter))
- Con Air (2000 TV Asahi edition) (William "Bill Bedlam" Bedford (Nick Chinlund))
- Crimson Tide (Lt. Paul Hellerman (Ricky Schroder))
- Das Boot (2004 TV Tokyo edition) (Obersteuermann Kriechbaum (Bernd Tauber))
- Dead Ahead: The Exxon Valdez Disaster (Rick Steiner (David Morse))
- Deepwater Horizon (Jimmy Harrell (Kurt Russell))
- Desperado (1998 TV Asahi edition) (Navajas (Danny Trejo))
- Die Hard with a Vengeance (Mathias Targo (Nick Wyman), Arab Cabbie (Aasif Mandvi))
- Don Jon (Jon Sr. (Tony Danza))
- Driven to Kill (Mikhail Abramov (Igor Jijikine))
- Final Destination (Agent Schrek (Roger Guenveur Smith))
- Finding Forrester (Terrell (Busta Rhymes))
- The Five-Year Engagement (Winton Childs (Rhys Ifans))
- FlashForward (FBI Assistant Director Stanford Wedeck (Courtney B. Vance))
- Flight (Charlie Anderson (Bruce Greenwood))
- For Love of the Game (Gus Sinski (John C. Reilly))
- Gossip Girl (Tim Gunn)
- House of Cards (Mark Usher (Campbell Scott))
- How to Train Your Dragon (Stoick the Vast (Gerard Butler))
- It Chapter Two (Alvin Marsh (Stephen Bogaert))
- Jacob's Ladder (Doug (Brian Tarantina))
- Knockin' on Heaven's Door (Martin Brest (Til Schweiger))
- Léon: The Professional (Norman Stansfield (Gary Oldman))
- Léon: The Professional (2009 Blu-Ray edition) (2nd Subordinate of Stansfield (Don Creech), Fatman (Frank Senger))
- Lessons of a Dream (Richard Hartung (Justus von Dohnányi))
- The Lost Bladesman (Cao Cao (Jiang Wen))
- Martha Marcy May Marlene (Patrick (John Hawkes))
- Michael Collins (Harry Boland (Aidan Quinn))
- Money Monster (Captain Marcus Powell (Giancarlo Esposito))
- NCIS: Los Angeles (Owen Granger (Miguel Ferrer))
- Pixels (Corporal Hill (Sean Bean))
- Police Story (Inspector Man)
- Predator 2 (1994 TV Asahi edition) (Captain Brent Pilgrim (Kent McCord))
- The Protector (Benny Garrucci (Bill Wallace))
- Race (Avery Brundage (Jeremy Irons))
- Rising Sun (Eddie Sakamura (Cary-Hiroyuki Tagawa))
- The Rock (Commander Charles Anderson (Michael Biehn))
- Rogue One (Galen Erso (Mads Mikkelsen))
- Safe House (2018 BS Japan edition) (Daniel Kiefer (Robert Patrick))
- Screamers (Marshal Richard Cooper / Private Becker Screamer (Roy Dupuis))
- Secondhand Lions (Stan (Nicky Katt))
- Seven (California (John C. McGinley))
- The Shawshank Redemption (Byron Hadley (Clancy Brown))
- Silent Trigger (O'Hara (Christopher Heyerdahl))
- Syriana (Stan Goff (William Hurt))
- The Thin Red Line (Sgt. Brian William Keck (Woody Harrelson))
- Twilight (Charlie Swan (Billy Burke))
- Underworld: Evolution (Markus Corvinus (Tony Curran))
- U.S. Marshals (Cosmo Renfro (Joe Pantoliano))
- War Horse (Major Jamie Stewart (Benedict Cumberbatch))
- Xanadu (Simpson (James Sloyan))

==== Animation ====
- Batman: The Animated Series (Ra's al Ghul)
- Batman: The Brave and the Bold (Gentleman Ghost)
- Beware the Batman (Ra's al Ghul)
- A Bug's Life (Francis)
- How to Train Your Dragon (Stoick the Vast)
- How to Train Your Dragon: The Hidden World (Stoick the Vast)
- Monster House (DJ's Father)
