= Dekirukana =

Japanese children's television series

Dekirukana (できるかな) was an educational children's television show produced by NHK between 1967 and 1990.

The show consisted of 15-minute episodes centered on crafts, mainly using paper. It showed kids how to use scissors and adhesive tape. The protagonists were Noppo (ノッポさん, Noppo-san), played by Ei Takami, and the anthropomorphic gopher, Gonta (ゴン太くん, Gonta-kun), played by Jun Imura.

Dekirukana was broadcast during the 1980s and 1990s with great success in many state-run networks in Latin America, to whom NHK donated the programme, along with other educational shows. In these countries the name of the show was translated as ¿Puedo hacerlo yo? ("Can I do it?"), but it is informally known as Nopo y Gonta, after the main characters.
