= Shoji Gatoh =

Japanese author and anime screenwriter

- 賀東 招二
- Born: July 11, 1971 (age 55); Shiga Prefecture, Japan
- Occupations: Author, screenwriter
- Writing career
- Genre: Light novel
- Notable work: Full Metal Panic!

Shoji Gatoh (賀東 招二, Gatō Shōji; born July 11, 1971) is a Japanese author and anime screenwriter from Shiga Prefecture, Japan. He is best known for the creation of the Full Metal Panic! franchise that includes light novels, manga and anime.

Gatoh first met with Koichi Chigira by accident when he bumped into him in Shinjuku when he was late for work. Later on, the two were shocked to meet with one another in the Gonzo Digimation office. The two would eventually team up to create the Full Metal Panic! anime television series.

== Linguistic influence ==
Gatoh coined the phrase burakku tekunoroji, a Romanji rending of "black" and "technology". He used the phrase in Full Metal Panic! to refer to the fictional types of technology so advanced that they exceed present human understanding. Burakku tekunoroji was translated into Chinese as heikeji, which retains the connotation of ineffable power but not the existential concerns in Gatoh's usage. Heikeji became popularised in China in 2016, where it refers to transformative technology (such as artificial intelligence) that may radically reshape the world for the better.

== 2019 Greta Thunberg Twitter controversy ==
On December 7, 2019, Shoji Gatoh posted controversial remarks to his Twitter feed in response to an NHK report about teenage environmental activist Greta Thunberg's appearance at COP25, a climate change conference in Spain. The comments read, "I hate that kid. If I was the ruler of the world, I would steal everything from her, knock her into the depths of despair and ridicule her. On top of that, I'd feed her a delicious, piping hot steak and watch her shed bitter tears. I'd love to see that." Gatoh later removed his tweet in response to public backlash and apologized for writing it.

Tetsuro Kasahara, who illustrated the manga Full Metal Panic! Zero, tweeted in response, "I did the art for a manga created by this person, but I don't agree with his remarks. I will no longer do any promotion for Full Metal Panic! Zero, nor draw any continuation. I will also donate any profits from the manga to environmental groups." Following the apology of Gatoh, he retracted this statement.

== Works ==
Light novels

- Full Metal Panic! series (published from December 18, 1999)
- Cop Craft series (published from November 18, 2009)
- Amagi Brilliant Park series (published from February 20, 2013)
- MOON FIGHTERS! (published from Fall 2023)

Manga

- Full Metal Panic! – Author
- Full Metal Panic! The Anime Mission (Resource Book Manga) – Author
- Amagi Brilliant Park – Author

Anime

- Full Metal Panic! – Original creator, Story Editor
- Full Metal Panic? Fumoffu – Screenplay (Eps. 1, 4, 8, 9, 12), Original creator
- Full Metal Panic! The Second Raid (TV) – Series Composition, Original creator
- Full Metal Panic! The Second Raid (OVA) – Screenplay, Original creator
- Hyouka – Series Composition
- Amagi Brilliant Park – Original creator, Series Supervision
- Full Metal Panic! Invisible Victory – Series Composition, Original creator
- Cop Craft – Series Composition, Original creator
- Estab Life: Great Escape – Series Composition, Script
