= Full Metal Panic! =

Japanese light novel series

- Cover of the first light novel volume featuring Kaname Chidori (foreground) and Sousuke Sagara (background)

フルメタル・パニック! (Furumetaru Panikku!)
- Genre: Action; Mecha; Military
- Light novel
- Written by: Shoji Gatoh
- Illustrated by: Shikidouji
- Published by: Fujimi Shobo
- English publisher: NA: Tokyopop (former) J-Novel Club
- Imprint: Fujimi Fantasia Bunko
- Magazine: Dragon Magazine
- Original run: September 18, 1998 – August 20, 2011
- Volumes: 23
Further information
Manga
Written by	Shoji Gatoh
Illustrated by	Retsu Tateo
Published by	Fujimi Shobo
English publisher	NA: ADV Manga
Magazine	Monthly Comic Dragon (former); Monthly Dragon Age
Original run	February 2000 – April 2005
Volumes	9
Manga
Full Metal Panic! Overload!
Written by	Shoji Gatoh
Illustrated by	Tomohiro Nagai
Published by	Kadokawa Shoten
English publisher	NA: ADV Manga
Imprint	Kadokawa Comics Dragon Jr.
Magazine	Monthly Dragon Junior
Original run	2000 – 2003
Volumes	5
Anime television series
Directed by	Koichi Chigira
Produced by	Shigeaki Tomioka; Tsuneo Takechi; Masafumi Fukui; Toshihito Suzuki
Written by	Fumihiko Shimo
Music by	Toshihiko Sahashi
Studio	Gonzo
Licensed by	Crunchyroll; UK: Anime Limited
Original network	WOWOW
English network	NA: Anime Network; UK: Vice on TV; US: Funimation Channel, KTEH
Original run	January 8, 2002 – June 18, 2002
Episodes	24
Manga
Full Metal Panic! Surplus
Written by	Shoji Gatoh
Illustrated by	Tomohiro Nagai
Published by	Kadokawa Shoten
Imprint	Kadokawa Comics Dragon Jr.
Published	July 1, 2003
Volumes	1
Anime television series
Full Metal Panic? Fumoffu
Directed by	Yasuhiro Takemoto
Produced by	Takatoshi Hamano; Shigeaki Tomioka; Tsuneo Takechi; Toshio Hatanaka
Written by	Shoji Gatoh; Fumihiko Shimo
Music by	Toshihiko Sahashi
Studio	Kyoto Animation
Licensed by	Crunchyroll; UK: Anime Limited
Original network	Fuji TV
English network	NA: Anime Network, Funimation Channel
Original run	August 25, 2003 – November 18, 2003
Episodes	12
Manga
Full Metal Panic! Comic Mission
Written by	Shoji Gatoh
Illustrated by	Retsu Tateo
Published by	Kadokawa Shoten
Imprint	Kadokawa Comics Dragon Jr.
Original run	October 30, 2003 – August 29, 2006
Volumes	7
Anime television series
Full Metal Panic! The Second Raid
Directed by	Yasuhiro Takemoto
Produced by	Hiroyuki Kitaura; Tomoko Suzuki; Satoshi Matsui; Tsuneo Takechi
Written by	Shoji Gatoh
Music by	Toshihiko Sahashi
Studio	Kyoto Animation
Licensed by	Crunchyroll; SG: Odex; UK: Anime Limited
Original network	WOWOW
English network	UK: Vice on TV
Original run	July 13, 2005 – October 19, 2005
Episodes	13
Manga
Full Metal Panic! Sigma
Written by	Shoji Gatoh
Illustrated by	Hiroshi Ueda
Published by	Fujimi Shobo
English publisher	SG: Chuang Yi
Imprint	Dragon Comics Age
Magazine	Monthly Dragon Age
Original run	April 9, 2005 – September 9, 2013
Volumes	19
Original video animation
A Relatively Leisurely Day in the Life of a Fleet Captain
Directed by	Yasuhiro Takemoto
Produced by	Tomoko Suzuki; Tsuneo Takechi
Written by	Shoji Gatoh
Music by	Toshihiko Sahashi
Studio	Kyoto Animation
Licensed by	Crunchyroll; UK: Anime Limited
Released	May 26, 2006
Runtime	29 minutes
Light novel
Full Metal Panic! Another
Written by	Naoto Ōguro
Illustrated by	Shikidouji
Published by	Fujimi Shobo
Imprint	Fujimi Fantasia Bunko
Magazine	Dragon Magazine
Original run	August 20, 2011 – February 20, 2016
Volumes	13
Manga
Full Metal Panic! Another
Written by	Naoto Ōguro
Illustrated by	Yō Taichi
Published by	Kadokawa Shoten
Imprint	Kadokawa Comics Ace
Magazine	Newtype Ace (2011–2013); Kadokawa Niconico Ace (2013–2014)
Original run	October 8, 2011 – 2014
Volumes	6
Manga
Full Metal Panic! 0 —ZERO—
Written by	Shoji Gatoh
Illustrated by	Tetsurō Kasahara
Published by	Fujimi Shobo
Imprint	Dragon Comics Age
Magazine	Monthly Dragon Age
Original run	2013 – 2015
Volumes	5
Manga
Full Metal Panic! Another Sigma
Written by	Naoto Ōguro
Illustrated by	Yō Taichi
Published by	Kadokawa Shoten
Imprint	Kadokawa Comics Ace
Magazine	Kadokawa Niconico Ace
Original run	2014 (issue 156) – 2015 (issue 195)
Volumes	2
Anime film series
Directed by	Koichi Chigira
Produced by	Shigeaki Tomioka; Tsuneo Takechi; Masafumi Fukui; Toshihito Suzuki
Written by	Fumihiko Shimo
Music by	Toshihiko Sahashi
Studio	Gonzo
Released	November 25, 2017 – January 20, 2018
Runtime	100 minutes (each)
Films	3
Anime television series
Full Metal Panic! Invisible Victory
Directed by	Katsuichi Nakayama
Written by	Shoji Gatoh
Music by	Toshihiko Sahashi
Studio	Xebec
Licensed by	Crunchyroll; UK: Anime Limited
Original network	AT-X, Tokyo MX, Sun TV, BS11
Original run	April 13, 2018 – July 19, 2018
Episodes	12
Light novel
Full Metal Panic! Family
Written by	Shoji Gatoh
Illustrated by	Shikidouji
Published by	Fujimi Shobo
Imprint	Fujimi Fantasia Bunko
Original run	January 19, 2024 – present
Volumes	3
Manga
Full Metal Panic! Family
Written by	Shoji Gatoh
Illustrated by	Ohige Kamisori
Published by	Fujimi Shobo
English publisher	NA: Yen Press
Imprint	Dragon Comics Age
Magazine	Monthly Dragon Age
Original run	December 9, 2024 – present
Volumes	2

Full Metal Panic! (Japanese: フルメタル・パニック!, Hepburn: Furumetaru Panikku!; often abbreviated to FMP!) is a series of light novels written by Shoji Gatoh and illustrated by Shikidouji. The series follows Sousuke Sagara, a member of the covert anti-terrorist private military organization known as Mithril, tasked with protecting Kaname Chidori, a hot-headed Japanese high school girl born with strange abilities that attracts the attention of various antagonistic groups.

Individual chapters are published on Monthly Dragon Magazine, followed by a paperback compilation released by Fujimi Shobo's Fujimi Fantasia Bunko. The novels are split between stories focusing on Sousuke's mission as a soldier of Mithril and comedic side stories centered on his life at Jindai High School.

The series has been adapted into different media; including four anime television series: Full Metal Panic! by Gonzo in 2002, Full Metal Panic? Fumoffu and Full Metal Panic! The Second Raid by Kyoto Animation in 2003 and 2005 respectively. An OVA was also released in 2006; and the newest television series, Full Metal Panic! Invisible Victory by Xebec, premiered in April 2018. The series also had several different manga series.

Tokyopop licensed the novels for English-language publication in North America and released parts of the series, while ADV Films licensed and dubbed the first season and the spin-off. The second season was licensed by Kadokawa Pictures USA with ADV Films producing the dub yet again. Mandalay Pictures acquired the film rights to the series in 2009. At Anime USA 2009, Funimation announced that it had acquired the rights to the first and second series of Full Metal Panic! and both were re-released and remastered on DVD and Blu-ray in 2010. The series premiered in North America on November 22, 2010, on Funimation Channel. The Fumoffu series made its North American television debut on the Funimation Channel on November 15, 2010.

A spin-off to the light novel series titled Full Metal Panic! Another was serialized between 2011 and 2016. Another received a manga adaptation split in two series. The light novels have sold 11 million copies.

== Development ==
When starting the series, Shoji Gatoh commented that as the series' theme was "Boy Meets Girl". Gatoh worked in the order to keep that as the focus regardless of the several other conflicts the story presented. Gatoh and Shiki Douji had a close relationship in the making of the novels. Gatoh gave Douji freedom in the design of the characters such as Sagara and Leonardo who were given multiple traits. On the other hand, Gatoh also gave Douji references for "gentlemen" featured in the story.

During production, Gatoh did not find difficulties in creating a balance between sci-fi and realistic elements since multiple Japanese series like Tetsujin 28 and Mazinger Z already provide the demographic a mixture between those elements. Originally, Douji felt that the characters were too realistic. Believing the teenage demographic would not like them, the author changed them so that were seen as cooler characters. Although the duo did not have difficulties with the novels' serious storylines, they still had problems with comedy.

Chidori and Sousuke's relationship was based on Japanese comedy due to how the two interact. To create a more interesting dynamic between the two leads, Gatoh wanted to change the ways Sagara and Chidori interact as he was tired of female characters requiring to be protected in the making for the light novels. As a result, Chidori instead supports Sagara multiple times.

== Plot ==
The series follows Sousuke Sagara, a member of a covert anti-terrorist private military organization known as Mithril, tasked with protecting Kaname Chidori, a spirited Japanese high school girl. He moves to Japan to study at Chidori's school, Jindai High School, with assistance from his comrades Kurz Weber and Melissa Mao. Having never experienced social interactions, Sousuke is seen as a military maniac by his schoolmates as he interprets everyday situations from a combat perspective. He comes to relate with Chidori who realizes that Sousuke is protecting her, but he does not reveal the reasons due to orders as well as the fact that he does not know why Chidori is being targeted by different organizations.

=== Characters ===
- Sergeant Sousuke Sagara (相良 宗介, Sagara Sōsuke) (Voiced by: Tomokazu Seki (Japanese); Chris Patton (English)) is the main protagonist of the anime who is of mixed Afghan-Japanese heritage. While his Japanese heritage can be deduced by his surname, he grew up in Helmand, a region in Afghanistan caught up in political strife. At the age of eight, Sagara joined a guerrilla movement to survive and was eventually recruited by Mithril. He only knows military life and as a result, does not handle the everyday occurrences of civilian life very well. Sousuke has difficulty integrating into high school due to his lack of social skills. Voiced by: Tomokazu Seki (Japanese); Chris Patton (English)
- Kaname Chidori (千鳥 かなめ, Chidori Kaname) Voiced by: Satsuki Yukino (Japanese); Luci Christian (English)) is the heroine of the anime who is direct and brash with her opinions, a trait she picked up when she studied abroad in the United States. Chidori feels the need to protect Sousuke from the harsh, cruel world of high school: a place where he doesn't quite fit. She is one of the "Whispered", a group of people who have technologically advanced knowledge in their subconscious that numerous governments and other groups want to use for their means.
- Teresa "Tessa" Testarossa (テレサ・テスタロッサ, Teresa Tesutarossa) (Voiced by: Yukana (Japanese); Hilary Haag (English)) is the captain of Mithril's submarine, Tuatha de Danaan. At 16 years old, she is the youngest member. Tessa maintains an optimistic outlook that she can make a difference in the world.
- Sergeant Kurz Weber (クルツ・ウェーバー, Kurutsu Uēbā) (Voiced by: Shin'ichiro Miki (Japanese); Vic Mignogna (English)) appears to be a typical ladies' man and often offers Sousuke advice about life and love. He is laid-back, but will not avoid responsibilities. He is regarded as one of the finest snipers in Mithril.
- Sergeant Major Melissa Mao (メリッサ・マオ, Merissa Mao) (Voiced by: Michiko Neya (Japanese); Alison Keith (English)) is the superior officer of both Sousuke and Kurz. A heavy smoker who loves beer wishes, she is free-spirited and optimistic.
- Gauron (ガウルン, Gaurun) (Voiced by: Masahiko Tanaka (Japanese); Mike MacRae (English) Masahiko Tanaka) is the main antagonist, a twisted and violent mercenary who is involved in the black market and global terrorism. Despite possessing a manipulative personality, his ruthless cunning and mastery of the Lambda Drive system make him a force to be reckoned with on the battlefield.
- Andrei Sergeivich Kalinin (Russian: Андрей Серге́евич Калинин) (Voiced by: Akio Ōtsuka (Japanese); Mike Kleinhenz, Kent Williams (Invisible Victory) (English)) is Sagara's commanding officer and one of Tessa's military strategists with the rank of lieutenant commander, fulfilling the role of Operations Director. He is also the foster father of Sagara. Andrei and Sousuke were once enemies as mentioned in a two-part episode by Sagara himself.
- Kim Yun-hee (Wraith) (Voiced by: Sayaka Ohara (Japanese); Elizabeth Maxwell, Christopher Ayres (Voice changer) (English))[English]) is a Korean ex-spy who is also a master of disguise. Despite seeming cold at first, following her 'rescue' by Kaname from Leonard Testarossa, she opens up slightly and secretly meets with Kan.
- Leonard Testarossa (Voiced by: Daisuke Namikawa (Japanese); Blake Shepherd (English)) is a child prodigy and Whispered like his younger twin sister, Tessa Testarossa. He is known as "Mr. Silver" in the executive circle of the Amalgam organization.
- Xia Yu Lan and Xia Yu Fan (Voiced by: Miyuki Sawashiro (Japanese); Kira Vincent-Davis (English) (Xia Yu Lan), Voiced by: Emi Shinohara (Japanese); Christine Auten (English) (Xia Yu Fan)) are Chinese-born assassins raised by Gauron, who ordered them to finish off Kaname Chidori to mentally break down Sousuke.
- Kyoko Tokiwa (常盤恭子, Tokiwa Kyōko) (Voiced by: Ikue Kimura (Japanese); Monica Rial) (English)) is Kaname's best friend, a humble and polite girl who wears glasses and has her hair tied in two pigtails. She tries to bring Kaname and Sousuke together, which might seem impossible given Sagara's tendency to blow things up at whim.
- Shinji Kazama (風間信二, Kazama Shinji) (Voiced by: Mamiko Noto (Japanese); Greg Ayres (English)) is Sousuke's Arm Slave-loving classmate. He shares the same amount of passion for AS as Sousuke and could be considered Sousuke's best school friend besides Kaname. His father is Shintaro Kazama and a secretary of Narashino's Assault Machine Troop. Shinji's love for AS began when his dad failed to become an AS pilot. As a result of his father's failure, Shinji strives to discover the result of the failure and to fulfil his father's dream of becoming a pilot.
- Mizuki Inaba (稲葉瑞樹, Inaba Mizuki) (Voiced by: Sayuri Yoshida (Japanese), Mandy Clark (English, Full Metal Panic!), Jessica Boone (English, Fumoffu), Sarah Wiedenheft (English, Invisible Victory)) is Chidori's classmate who initially blamed her for stealing her boyfriend. She becomes one of her closer friends later on in the series. Mizuki is easily infatuated with various men, who usually take an interest in Kaname instead.
- Eri Kagurazaka (神楽坂恵理, Kagurazaka Eri) (Voiced by: Rio Natsuki (Japanese); Allison Sumrall (English)) is an English teacher at Jindai High and is the class advisor to Sousuke, Kaname, Kyoko, Shinji, and Mizuki in Class II-4. She is a kind teacher who is willing to put the interest of her students over her own.
- Atsunobu Hayashimizu (林水 敦信, Hayashimizu Atsunobu) (Voiced by: Toshiyuki Morikawa (Japanese); Christopher Ayres (English)) is the president of Jindai High's Student Council and a third year student. He is intelligent and seems to be able to deal with any situation no matter how difficult it is.
- Ren Mikihara (美樹原 蓮, Mikihara Ren) (Voiced by: Rie Tanaka (Japanese); Nancy Novotny, Julie Shields (Invisible Victory) (English)) is the Secretary of Jindai High's Student Council, a friend of Kaname's, and the daughter of a Yakuza boss. She is an example of Yamato nadeshiko – the Japanese ideal of femininity – and as such, she is beautiful, dependable, and caring. She seems to have feelings for Atsunobu Hayashimizu, the Student Council's president.

== Media ==
=== Light novels ===
The light novel series Full Metal Panic! is written by Shoji Gatoh and illustrated by Shikidouji. It was serialised by Fujimi Shobo in its monthly magazine Gekkan Dragon Magazine since June 1998 and published under the Fujimi Fantasia Bunko imprint in tankōbon format since September 1998. Gatoh often found delays in writing the novels, which led to delays to the publication of the series' volumes. The series focuses on Sergeant Sousuke Sagara's arrival to the Jindai High School where he was assigned to protect the student Kaname Chidori while also acting as a student.

A total of twelve full-length volumes have been released from September 18, 1998, to August 20, 2010. In parallel to the twelve volumes, nine standalone light novels of the series (which form the short story collection) have also been published from December 17, 1998, to August 20, 2011. Two more volumes titled Side Arms focusing on the past of some characters (which form the side story collection) and the birth of Mithril and Amalgam have been published on April 20, 2004, and July 20, 2006. In contrast to the full length volumes, short story collection focuses on the comedy elements from the series. In January 2010, Gatoh wrote another of these stories to celebrate Gekkan Dragon Magazine's 300th issue, which has been included in the last short story collection volume.

Another series of spin-off novels, Full Metal Panic! Another, has been released by Naoto Ōguro with supervision of Shoji Gatoh, and also illustrated by Shikidouji, from August 20, 2011, to February 20, 2016, consisting of thirteen volumes and set years after the original series' ending.

On May 19, 2023, Kadokawa announced that a new Full Metal Panic! series would be published, centering on Sousuke and Kaname two decades after the events of FMP! The first volume of the series, titled Full Metal Panic! Family, was released on January 19, 2024.

Tokyopop licensed the Full Metal Panic! series for North America release, publishing the first regular light novel on September 11, 2007. The latest released volume is the fourth on February 1, 2011, which is a compilation from the original fourth and fifth full-length volumes from the series. No short story collection volumes nor side story collection ones have been published and the company has shut down its publishing operations in North America on May 31, 2011. In 2015, at Anime Expo and San Diego Comic-Con, Tokyopop announced that it would relaunch its publishing operations in North America. The following year, in 2016, Tokyopop also would consider light novels, but nothing has been disclosed about Full Metal Panic! novels publication.

On March 18, 2019, J-Novel Club announced that all the original twelve novels would be translated again and released in English. The series was released as e-books starting that year, with the final volume released in 2021. Hardcover "Collectors Editions", each compiling three novels per volume, were released by J-Novel Club from 2020 to 2022. On July 1, 2022, J-Novel announced that they were translating the short stories. They were released as e-books starting that year, with the final volume released in 2023. On October 3, 2023, Podium Audio released an audiobook version of the first volume.

=== Manga ===
The Full Metal Panic! light novel series has been adapted to manga on multiple occasions. The first manga series: Full Metal Panic, was serialized in Monthly Comic Dragon by Retsu Tateo. This manga was collected in nine tankōbon volumes published from August 30, 2000, to July 1, 2005. Announced in July 2003, Full Metal Panic! became one of the first manga series licensed by ADV Manga. They released all of the volumes between November 10, 2003 and April 11, 2006.

A parallel series titled Full Metal Panic! Comic Mission (フルメタル・パニック! Comic Mission) which focused more on the comedic elements from the franchise was also written by Retsu Tateo and ran for seven volumes between November 1, 2003, and September 1, 2006.

Full Metal Panic! Overload! (いきなり! フルメタル・パニック!, Ikinari! Furumetaru Panikku!) was a spin-off series by Tomohiro Nagai. Five volumes were released between January 30, 2001, and April 1, 2003. Overload was licensed by ADV Manga in December 2004, and all of its volumes were published in English between June 6, 2005, and May 24, 2006. Tomohiro Nagai also wrote Full Metal Panic! Surplus (フルメタル・パニック!Surplus) which is a single tankōbon manga published on July 1, 2003, focused more on the action elements from the franchise.

Full Metal Panic! Sigma (フルメタル・パニック!Σ), written by Shoji Gatoh and illustrated by Hiroshi Ueda, focuses on the missions of Sousuke as a sergeant. The first volume was published on August 1, 2005, and the final volume: the nineteenth, was published on September 20, 2013. The story and events of this manga adaption are based on the fourth Full Metal Panic! light novel and onwards.

A manga adaptation of the Full Metal Panic! Family novels with illustrations by Ohige Kamisori began serialization in the Monthly Dragon Age magazine on December 9, 2024. The manga is licensed in English by Yen Press.

=== Anime ===
==== Full Metal Panic! ====
The anime series was produced by Gonzo Digimation and originally aired in 2002 after its original air date was canceled due to the September 11 attacks. The production of 3 director's cut films based on the first television series was announced in 2017. The 1st Section Boy Meets Girl premiered on November 25, 2017, at Kadokawa Cinema Shinjuku in Japan, 2nd Section One Night Stand premiered on January 13, 2018, and 3rd Section Into the Blue premiered on January 20, 2018.

==== Fumoffu ====
Full Metal Panic? Fumoffu! (フルメタル・パニック? ふもっふ!, Furumetaru Panikku? Fumoffu!) is a companion series to the anime series Full Metal Panic! by Kyoto Animation, and takes place between the first season and The Second Raid. Markedly different in tone to the first series, Fumoffu is based on the more comical short stories Gatou published alongside the main novels, emphasizing the high school romantic comedy aspects of Full Metal Panic! with often crude humor and focuses on the romantic tension between Sousuke Sagara and Kaname Chidori. It frequently has parodies of itself and anime stereotypes. None of the mecha combat or political intrigue, which characterized much of the original Full Metal Panic!, can be seen in the series. The only reference to the mecha aspect of Full Metal Panic! is the Bonta-kun, which is one of the most prominent parodies in the anime. Sousuke uses spare Bonta-kun costumes to make highly effective suits of power armor, but they look like teddy bears wearing army gear and can only say: "Fu" and "Mo" in different combinations.

==== The Second Raid ====
Full Metal Panic! The Second Raid (フルメタル・パニック! TSR, Furu Metaru Panikku! TSR) is the direct sequel to the original anime series. It was produced by Kyoto Animation and ran for thirteen episodes. The series is based on the Ending Day by Day novels and takes place three months after the events that occurred in the Tuatha de Danaan at the end of the original Full Metal Panic! series. Mithril learns of a secret organization that has technology able to counter the ECS (Electronic Conceal System) mode. The organization, known as Amalgam, has access to Black Technology, which was obtained from the Whispered. Like the other intelligence agencies, Amalgam intends to obtain more. Sousuke's mission to protect Chidori is terminated by Mithril, instead leaving her in the care of an anonymous agent known as Wraith. There is a one-episode OVA that takes place after Full Metal Panic! The Second Raid. It is a humorous standalone story.

==== Invisible Victory ====
Full Metal Panic! Invisible Victory (フルメタル・パニック! インビジブル・ビクトリー, Furumetaru Panikku! Inbijiburu Bikutorī) is the fourth TV series in the franchise. Kyoto Animation had not returned to produce the fourth anime adaptation. Instead, it was produced by studio Xebec. It premiered in April 2018. During Anime Expo 2017, the series creator confirmed that Full Metal Panic! Invisible Victory is a "continuation" that won't contain any "explanation or expository episodes." He stated that the pacing of the story is going to be "full throttle from the get-go" although it would still "follow the original work pretty closely". The series consisted of twelve episodes. The opening song is "Even...if" and the ending song is "Yes", both performed by Tamaru Yamada.

=== Live action film ===
A live action film adaptation was announced by Mandalay Pictures in April 2009, with Zac Efron rumored to be attached to the project. Efron has since confirmed a meeting took place regarding the project but added that the adaptation was unlikely to happen.

=== Video game ===
Full Metal Panic! Fight! Who Dares Wins, developed by B.B. Studio and published by Bandai Namco Entertainment Inc., was released on May 31, 2018. Specialist Box limited edition includes Invisible Victory behind-the-scenes Blu-ray, a special novel by Shoji Gatoh, drama CD, replica autographed mini script of "Megami no Rainichi: Date Hen," a case for the Blu-ray and CD, and a special Shiki Douji-illustrated box. Early purchases include download code for the 'Armed Slave-Use Special Weapons Three Set' (Boxer 2nd Revision 76mm Shot Cannon (Armor-Piercing Ammunition) Cartridge Extension Model, ASG96-B Revision 57mm Glide Cannon, Graw-X Single Molecule Cutter (Repulsion Field Prototype Model)).

== Reception ==
The second DVD volume of Full Metal Panic! The Second Raid was given a favorable review by Theron Martin of Anime News Network for pushing the character developments of Sousuke and Kaname as well as dramatic elements beyond comedy and action. Describing the impact of the volume, Martin explains that "[t]he full impact of that [Sousuke and Kaname's relationship] comes out beautifully in episode 7, when Kaname seeks out Sousuke in a moment of fear and, for the first time, Sousuke isn't there for her. It's one of those telling moments that can define an entire series."

THEM Anime Reviews has noted that the Arm Slaves, like most real life vehicles, are done so meticulously that fans of mecha series would "scour online catalogues for tech books and sketches." Bureau 42 says that the "mecha[Arm Slave] action in the show is very well done. While I can't compare the action with other more grounded mecha shows like Patlabor, the combat is very well done and easy to follow, and visually interesting." Triforce commented that Arm Slave battles in the Full Metal Panic! series would be able to keep viewer's attention to the show.

Negative criticism has surfaced on the role of the Arm Slaves throughout the Full Metal Panic! series. For instance, Ender's review states that their mecha roles are confusing that the Arm Slaves are both "08th MS Team soldiers and Dragon Ball Z-type fighters, hurling energy balls at each other and going "Super Saiya-jin." Anime Database rated the Full Metal Panic! series 4 out of 5 because of the Arm Slaves battles since they start out from being good to being very unrealistic. GameSpot Union comments on the relationship between the Arm Slaves and the animation done on Full Metal Panic!, saying both animation and camera views were bad.

Writing for The Encyclopedia of Science Fiction, Piotr Konieczny described Full Metal Panic! as a successful hybrid of military science fiction and romantic comedy, arguing that its blend of realistic mecha warfare and high-school humor became the franchise's defining characteristic. While he acknowledged that the tonal balance of the first series could be uneven, he considered the anime faithful to Shōji Gatoh's light novels and praised later installments for gradually shifting toward more serious explorations of identity, ethics, and philosophy. Konieczny also highlighted the characterization of Sousuke Sagara, whose inability to adapt to civilian life provided both much of the series' comedy and its emotional core, and concluded that the franchise's lasting significance lay in demonstrating that military SF and romantic comedy could be successfully combined, influencing a number of later light novel and anime series.

The novels have over 11 million copies in print.

== See also ==
- Amagi Brilliant Park, another series written by Shoji Gatoh
