= Shawne Kleckner =

American entrepreneur, anime producer, and business executive

Shawne P. Kleckner
- Born: May 22, 1972 (age 53); Webster City, Iowa, United States
- Occupation: American entrepreneur, anime producer, and business executive
- Employer: Kleckner Foundation (current)
- Known for: Right Stuf, Inc.; LazerX; Kleckner Foundation

Shawne P. Kleckner is an American entrepreneur, anime producer, and business executive who co-founded Right Stuf Inc. in 1987 and led the company for over 35 years. Under his stewardship, Right Stuf grew from a niche mail-order publisher into one of the largest independent online retailers, licensors, and distributors of anime and manga in North America.

As a founding-generation figure of the commercial anime industry in the United States, Kleckner is recognized for helping build the infrastructure through which licensed Japanese animation first reached broad American audiences. He championed a philosophy of direct fan engagement and premium-quality home video releases at a time when anime occupied a marginal position in mainstream American entertainment. Following the acquisition of Right Stuf by Crunchyroll in 2022, he departed the company, with colleagues and fans noting that his personal approach to vendor and customer relationships had defined the organization's culture throughout his tenure.

== Education ==
Shawne P. Kleckner enrolled at Iowa State University, graduating with a degree in computer engineering.

== Career ==
=== Founding of Right Stuf (1987–1993) ===
While still a high school student, Kleckner worked part-time for Des Moines-based computer reseller and manufacturer Century Systems, founded by entrepreneur Robert "Todd" Ferson. Ferson, a fan of classic Japanese animation, had been trying to obtain footage of the 1960s television series Astro Boy for his own collection and realized the title could not be found through ordinary retail channels. He conceived of licensing and releasing it commercially, and collaborated with Kleckner to acquire the license. As the licensor did not have the materials readily available, Kleckner worked to track down the original NBC Enterprises English dub materials produced by Fred Ladd.

In July 1987, Ferson and Kleckner renamed Ferson's existing shell company—originally called "The Right Stuff," a reference to the 1983 film—to Right Stuf, launching it as an anime retailer and producer upon securing the Astro Boy license. Kleckner was still a student at the time. Assembling usable English-dubbed prints required two years of research and correspondence to piece together surviving elements from scattered sources, prior to the widespread availability of home internet. Right Stuf's first commercial release—a VHS tape containing two episodes of Astro Boy—appeared in 1989.

The company built from its initial focus on Astro Boy, Gigantor, and Kimba the White Lion into a broader catalog of licensed anime, manga, and merchandise. Its growth earned it inclusion on the Inc. 500 list of the 500 fastest-growing private companies in the United States in 1999, and Kleckner was profiled by Inc. magazine for the company's performance. He also received the Association of Collegiate Entrepreneurs (ACE) North American Entrepreneur of the Year award during this period.

=== Company growth and retail expansion (1994–2007) ===
In 1994, Right Stuf launched one of the early dedicated anime retail websites in North America, enabling online ordering at a time when anime was sold primarily through specialty stores or mail-order catalogs.

Throughout Right Stuf's growth, Kleckner developed and institutionalized a customer-oriented service approach that he referred to as "Super Service"—a term he used to describe the company's emphasis on personalized customer responses, secure packaging, and reliable shipping: recognition that anime collectors were a passionate, loyal community which had different expectations from regular mass-market retail. He described this approach as central to the company's identity and, in his internal farewell message to staff in 2022, cited it as among the defining commitments he hoped the company would maintain.

Kleckner described Right Stuf's evolution in a 1999 interview with Anime News Network, noting that the company had become a hybrid publisher and distributor in the mid-1990s in response to demand for titles unavailable through ordinary retail channels. He expanded on this approach in multiple appearances on the ANNCast podcast, discussing Right Stuf's acquisition strategy, the state of the physical media market, the economics of Blu-ray, and the North American Gundam home video catalog. A consistent theme across these discussions was his position that investing in the creation of legal, high-quality releases — through collector-grade packaging, complete home video editions, and transparent communication about licensing challenges — was the more durable commercial model at a time when piracy represented a significant alternative for dissatisfied fans; in his view, cutting corners on product quality or availability would ultimately drive committed buyers toward unauthorized sources rather than away from them.

Kleckner created the music label AnimeTrax in 2001 based on consumer requests from customers a joint venture between AD Vision and Right Stuf to bring original soundtrack albums to fans outside of Japan.

Under Kleckner, Right Stuf also functioned as an industry service provider. The company acquired Mangamania, Central Park Media's online manga retail division, and the Z Store, Funimation's original online retail arm. It additionally provided e-commerce infrastructure and fulfillment services for other major distributors—including AD Vision, Tokyopop, Geneon, and Funimation—operating their initial online storefronts before those companies established independent platforms, and offered warehousing and marketing services to other publishers. Industry observers described this approach as one of inclusive stewardship: focusing on cooperation toward the growth of the industry as a whole, and allowing smaller publishers to access audiences they could not reach independently, letting the ecosystem grow collectively rather than competing for exclusive market position.

In late 2018, Kleckner announced Right Stuf would discontinue its long-running printed mail-order catalog—first produced in 1989—citing rising production costs, declining use, and environmental considerations, completing the company's shift to exclusively digital retail engagement.

=== Producer and curator: Nozomi Entertainment (2007–2022) ===
In a 1999 interview with Anime News Network, Kleckner described Right Stuf's evolution as a response to fan demand: "We became more of a hybrid publisher/distributor in the mid-90s, as we responded to the demand of our customers who could not obtain the product they were looking for at their local store." In addition, the high costs of licensing for anime had essentially removed Right Stuf from competition for top tier releases. In the same interview, he identified The Irresponsible Captain Tylor as among his personal favorite anime—a title he would later release decades later as a premium collector's edition.

At Anime Expo in June 2007, Kleckner announced that Right Stuf had renamed its production division to Nozomi Entertainment, taking its name from the Japanese word nozomi (望み), meaning "wish" or "hope." The label's stated purpose was producing collector-grade releases for audiences of all ages. Under Nozomi, Right Stuf produced premium releases of titles including Astro Boy (1963), Dirty Pair, Mobile Suit Gundam, The Irresponsible Captain Tylor, Revolutionary Girl Utena, His and Her Circumstances, Kimba the White Lion (1965), Emma: A Victorian Romance, and Aria the Animation, among many others.

Right Stuf also operated Lucky Penny Entertainment, a budget-priced label for niche titles, and in March 2012 launched 5 Points Pictures, a live-action division through a distribution agreement with CJ Entertainment. Its adult-content imprint, Critical Mass Video, operated separately from 1996 through the Crunchyroll acquisition.

=== Critical Mass Video ===
Right Stuf's adult-content publishing imprint, Critical Mass Video, was founded in 1996 as a separately branded label to handle mature titles, operating with its own branding, age-restricted packaging, and separate marketing channels. Kleckner confirmed the label's two founding releases in the 1999 ANN interview: an uncut edition of Violence Jack—the first uncensored North American release of that title, restoring content excised by Manga Entertainment's earlier version—and the erotic comedy Weather Report Girl. From 1998 to 2015 the label published numerous adult anime titles on VHS and DVD; it was reactivated in 2019 and issued its first Blu-ray. Among its final releases was a SteelBook Blu-ray of Interspecies Reviewers, which Right Stuf had licensed after Funimation dropped it due to its explicit content. The full Critical Mass Video catalog was sold to EroAnimeStore.com on August 5, 2022, the day after the Crunchyroll acquisition closed.

=== Fan engagement, crowdfunding, and industry communications ===
From 1990 onward Kleckner was a regular presence at major anime conventions, attending as both a company representative and a participant in fan communities. He gave candid long-form interviews on the Anime News Network podcast ANNCast on multiple occasions between 2013 and 2018, speaking about the economics of licensing, the physical media market, Right Stuf's acquisition strategy, and the North American anime retail landscape. On the Anime World Order podcast, he spoke openly about the economics of licensing, the challenges of producing dubs for niche titles, and the mechanics of the physical media market. He conducted multiple Reddit Ask Me Anything (AMA) sessions, answering fan questions about licensing constraints, production challenges, and business strategy with a transparency that industry observers noted was unusual for a company of Right Stuf's scale. One AMA addressed why certain long-desired titles—including Naoki Urasawa's Monster—remained unavailable, explaining in detail the multi-party rights complexities that made licensing "a quagmire."

This direct relationship with fans informed his approach to production financing. According to Headline Studios founder and dub director DiGiorgi, Kleckner had proposed using Kickstarter to finance English dubbing projects as early as 2011; the actual campaigns launched in 2017, after concerns from Japanese licensors had been addressed. Kleckner was highly involved in all of the projects, from on-camera interviews, marketing, and fan engagement through Reddit AMAs and Anime News Network Interviews, and documented the production process through Kickstarter updates. Four campaigns followed for titles that would not have received English dubs or extended releases through conventional commercial avenues:

- In 2017, Nozomi Entertainment launched a Kickstarter campaign to produce an English dub and HD Blu-ray release of Aria the Animation, the 2005 television anime adaptation of Kozue Amano's manga, directed by Junichi Satō. The Aria campaign launched at Otakon on August 12, 2017, with an initial goal of US$110,000 to fund a dub of the first season of Aria the Animation (2005) and a Blu-ray release. As the campaign exceeded successive stretch goals, its scope expanded to cover the complete franchise: the full Aria the Natural and Aria the Origination television series, the Aria the OVA ~Arietta~, picture dramas, and Aria the Avvenire—the final OVA, which had not previously been released outside Japan. Cast included Michele Knotz, Jessica Calvello, Veronica Taylor, and Lisa Ortiz. The campaign closed on September 11, 2017 having raised US$595,676 from 2,648 backers against the US$110,000 initial goal, more than five times the original target.
- In 2018, a Kickstarter campaign for an English-dubbed Blu-ray release of Emma: A Victorian Romance, the anime adaptation of Kaoru Mori's manga, notable in that no Blu-ray edition of the series existed in Japan or internationally at the time, making the campaign the mechanism for the title's first HD release in any territory as well as its first English dub. A US$180,000 stretch goal would fund the second season. Particular attention was given to dialect authenticity: dialect adviser Rhiannon Ross and consultants from AccentHelp oversaw script adaptations, casting auditions, and recording sessions to ensure the accuracy of period English accents. The campaign met its initial goal within days of launch and closed on October 18, 2018 having raised US$253,834 from 1,615 backers, surpassing the stretch goal and funding dubs of both seasons.. To date, this title has never seen a Japanese Blu-Ray release.
- In 2020, The Irresponsible Captain Tylor release, announced at Virtual Crunchyroll Expo on September 5, 2020, differed in structure from the preceding campaigns: rather than a fixed-goal Kickstarter, it operated as an incremental pre-order campaign in which additional content was unlocked as revenue milestones were reached. The base Collector's Ultra Edition Blu-ray included all 26 television episodes, the full 10-episode OVA series, a hardback art book, the original Spanish dub, and multiple supplemental features. As pre-order thresholds were met, further content was added, including an on-camera interview and new original short story written by series creator Hitoshi Yoshioka (his first return to the series in decades, and unpublished in Japan), and an interview with composer Kenji Kawai. The Collector's Ultra Edition was released on April 1, 2021.
- In 2021, A Kickstarter campaign was created to produce an English dub and Blu-ray release of the 1985 Dirty Pair television anime, adapted from Haruka Takachiho's science fiction novel series with character designs by Yoshikazu Yasuhiko. The original 1985 television series had not received an English dub at that time. The campaign launched on October 1, 2021 with an initial goal of US$275,000. Kleckner served as executive producer. A notable technical development that made the project possible was the rediscovery of the original music and sound effects track for the Dirty Pair OVA series, which had been considered lost; ADV Films's earlier OVA dub had been produced with a recreated music and effects track precisely because the original could not be located. The recovered track allowed the Blu-ray release to present both the new dub with the original music and effects and the original ADV version for comparison. The campaign announced that Pamela Lauer — who had voiced Kei in ADV's earlier OVA releases and was retired from voice acting — would return to reprise the role, alongside Jessica Calvello returning as Yuri. The funded release was also to include new releases of every entry in the Dirty Pair franchise, a chipboard case featuring new art by original character designer Tsukasa Dokite, a 5.1 audio track, and commentary tracks by anime historian Mike Toole. The campaign closed on October 31, 2021 having raised US$731,406 from 3,303 backers, with all stretch goals met.Production was underway when Crunchyroll acquired Right Stuf; post-acquisition delays and poor communication with backers drew significant fan criticism. A February 2026 Anime News Network investigation confirmed that Kleckner was bound by a non-disclosure agreement limiting his public statements about the acquisition period. Kleckner has to date made no public statements about the controversy.. Plans for other projects appear to have been discarded post-acquisition.

A fellow producer running a separate anime Kickstarter campaign wrote publicly that "Right Stuf is far more than an online retailer. Shawne has created a community with the ability to connect anime producers with fans, and that is golden."

=== Acquisition by Crunchyroll and departure from Right Stuf (2022) ===
On August 4, 2022, Crunchyroll—a joint venture of Sony Pictures Entertainment and Aniplex—announced the acquisition of Right Stuf. In the official press release, Kleckner stated that the acquisition would allow Right Stuf's mission of connecting fans with products to be accelerated and scaled. The removal of adult content from the storefront following the acquisition drew coverage from Polygon and Kotaku, which noted the particular irony that titles Right Stuf had specifically taken on due to their adult classification, including one from Funimation, were now excluded.

The acquisition of Right Stuf by Crunchyroll in 2022 marked a symbolic end of the independent retail era in North American anime distribution. With streaming platforms now the dominant form of content access and consumption—and global giants like Sony consolidating distribution, streaming, and merchandising—the market has shifted from a landscape of multiple independent niche distributors to one where a few major conglomerates control both content and commerce.

Kleckner departed on December 14, 2022. In his internal email to staff, he highlighted the "Super Service" customer approach and expressed confidence in the Right Stuf management team at Crunchyroll. He was described at the time by Otaku USA Magazine as having maintained the profile of a fellow fan of anime throughout his tenure, rather than a conventional corporate executive.. Kleckner described the decision publicly as "by far, one of the hardest things I have ever done," and described Right Stuf as having comprised "70% of my life." His final statement concluded with the Japanese phrase 何から何まで、本当にありがとうございました—"Thank you for absolutely everything, from start to finish "— reflecting the depth of his personal relationship with Japanese culture and with the fans and partners he had worked alongside for over three decades.

In September 2023, Crunchyroll announced the Right Stuf brand would be merged into the Crunchyroll Store. No new releases have been published under the Nozomi Entertainment label since the acquisition, and most of the catalog has since fallen out of print.

== Restoration and preservation of Tezuka works from Mushi Productions ==
Early in his career, Kleckner worked to obtain source materials for home video releases of several early television adaptations of works by Osamu Tezuka, including Astro Boy, Kimba the White Lion, and Princess Knight. While assembling materials for Right Stuf's early home video releases on videocassette, the company acquired a variety of surviving broadcast and distribution elements; however, much of the available material was of poor visual quality due to deterioration or the use of lower-generation prints. Right Stuf released 34 episodes of Astro Boy on VHS during this early period.

For later restoration work, the best surviving picture elements were in many cases derived from Japanese film negatives, while the English-language audio tracks originated from earlier international television prints that had been heavily edited for broadcast. These mismatches in running time and structure between picture and audio required episodes to be reconstructed by re-cutting picture elements and aligning them with surviving English audio in order to produce coherent masters suitable for home video release.

Many early anime productions faced preservation challenges; materials from Tezuka's studio Mushi Production were dispersed after the company's bankruptcy in the 1970s, and surviving elements for television programs were often incomplete or deteriorated. Right Stuf later undertook projects through Nozomi Entertainment to locate improved source materials and reconstruct masters for later releases of Tezuka television series, with additional digital restoration performed to improve surviving elements.

One episode of Astro Boy (#34, "The Beast from 20,000 Fathoms") had been ordered destroyed by Tezuka after its original broadcast, having been produced by Studio Zero—whose staff included prominent manga artists such as Shotaro Ishinomori, Jiro Tsunoda, and the Fujiko Fujio duo—while the regular Mushi Production staff were on vacation. However, a negative had been sent to NBC for dubbing by Fred Ladd, and Kleckner was able to obtain a film print of the English-language version. He subsequently returned a copy to the Osamu Tezuka Museum. In 2002, the Japanese broadcaster NHK announced it would air this long-lost episode; because the surviving print was an English dub, NHK broadcast it with Japanese subtitles as part of a special feature on its satellite channel BS2.

These efforts helped preserve several of Tezuka's early television series that might otherwise have been lost due to the deterioration or disappearance of original materials, making it possible for the programs to remain accessible to modern audiences. All episodes of these three series were released on DVD by Nozomi Entertainment. Releases produced under Kleckner's direction returned these classic series to circulation decades after their original broadcasts.

== Other business roles ==
Concurrent with his tenure at Right Stuf, Kleckner served as Vice President of Business Affairs and CFO of Century Systems until 2000. He also co-founded Intersphere USA, Ltd in 1994 with Ferson, which acquired North American distribution rights to the Netherlands-developed Intersphere laser tag system and operated LazerX-branded arena facilities including a flagship at Merle Hay Mall in Des Moines, Iowa. Equipment was initially manufactured in the Netherlands; later-generation hardware was manufactured in Iowa. The venture was formally dissolved in 2006.

Kleckner also served on several regional corporate boards and oversaw Right Stuf's 2005 facility relocation, remodeling to meet Energy Star compliance and installing a geothermal HVAC system. He has supported community organizations including Boys & Girls Clubs of Central Iowa and the Iowa Coalition Against Domestic Violence.

== Kleckner Foundation ==
Following his departure from Right Stuf, Kleckner devoted himself to the Kleckner Foundation, a 501(c)(3) private foundation (EIN 84-4747454) he had established in 2019 and endowed following the sale. The Foundation's primary mission is Japan–U.S. cultural exchange, reflecting the professional relationships and personal respect for Japanese culture that Kleckner developed across 35 years in the anime industry. In his own words: "My entire career developed around Japanese pop culture and working with Japanese companies and fans to popularize it around the world. I came to have a deep respect for Japanese culture, and for the Japanese people. Bridging the two cultures creates a depth of experience and understanding that can only deepen the relationship between our two nations."

Secondary program areas supported by the Foundation include STEM scholarships and U.S.-Japan exchange opportunities, Soto Zen nonprofits in the United States, and jazz and symphonic music through cross-cultural events and scholarships. The Foundation is governed by Kleckner as Managing Director; his wife Tomoko Kleckner as Director overseeing Japanese partnerships and grant approvals, drawing on her earlier career in international sales for Japanese production and licensing companies; Legal advisory is provided by Gary S. Moriwaki, a former Vice Chair of the U.S.-Japan Council and Governor of the Japanese American National Museum.

The Foundation provided a grant to fund English and Japanese captions for all episodes of The Anime Business documentary series, enabling the series to reach Japanese-speaking audiences; the grant is credited in each episode's description.

Kleckner is a practitioner of Soto Zen Buddhism and serves as Board President of the Des Moines Zen Center.

== The Anime Business documentary series ==
The Anime Business is an ongoing documentary interview series produced by AnimEigo and hosted by Justin Sevakis, who founded Anime News Network in 1998 and acquired AnimEigo in 2024. Released on the AnimEigo YouTube channel from February 2025, the series documents the history of the North American anime and manga industries through long-form interviews with founding-generation executives, distributors, publishers, and translators. Press coverage described the series as "acclaimed" and it was featured at Otakon 2025.

The Kleckner Foundation's grant funded English and Japanese captions for all episodes. As of February 2026, 13 episodes had been released, featuring subjects including John O'Donnell (Central Park Media), Robert Napton (Bandai Entertainment), Andy Frain and Laurence Guinness (Manga Video/Manga Entertainment), Stu Levy (Tokyopop), Kurt Hassler (Yen Press/Kadokawa World Entertainment), Jerry Beck (Streamline Pictures), John Sirabella (Media Blasters), Helen McCarthy and Jonathan Clements (co-authors of The Anime Encyclopedia), and Peter Tatara (founder of Anime NYC).

As of early 2026, Kleckner had not appeared as an interview subject in the series, but has been mentioned by several interviewees. A February 2026 ANN investigation into the delayed Dirty Pair Kickstarter noted that an AnimEigo representative had confirmed Kleckner was bound by a non-disclosure agreement related to the Right Stuf–Crunchyroll acquisition, which may account for his absence thus far from the series.

== Legacy ==
Kleckner's 35-year career is recognized as central to the development of the North American anime market from an informal fan-driven subculture into a mature commercial industry. His contributions operated on several simultaneous levels: as an infrastructure builder whose e-commerce platform and industry services helped the major firms in the industry grow, as well as helping smaller distributors reach audiences they could not have accessed independently; as a quality standard-setter whose Nozomi Entertainment releases defined what a collector-grade anime edition could be; as a community architect whose Super Service philosophy, transparent communications, AMAs, and crowdfunding campaigns demonstrated that treating fans as partners was both ethically and commercially sound; and as a cultural bridge whose post-career philanthropic work represents the natural extension of a professional life built on deepening the U.S.–Japan relationship through popular culture.

Colleagues and press who worked with Kleckner over this period consistently described him in personal as much as professional terms, noting his combination of commercial acumen and genuine personal engagement. Otaku USA Magazine observed at his departure that his role at Right Stuf had always been that of a fellow fan expressing itself through the business, rather than a corporate executive managing a product category from a distance.

== Selected production credits ==
As executive producer, Kleckner oversaw North American releases of numerous titles through Right Stuf and Nozomi Entertainment. A partial list, as catalogued by the Anime News Network Encyclopedia, includes Astro Boy (1963 series), Gigantor, Kimba the White Lion (1965), Cat's Eye (1983–85 TV series), Dirty Pair (OVAs, TV series, and films), Boogiepop Phantom, His and Her Circumstances, The Third: The Girl with the Blue Eye, Aria the Animation, Aria the Natural, Aria the Origination, Big Windup! Season 2, Revolutionary Girl Utena, Mobile Suit Gundam (original series, in partnership with Sunrise), The Irresponsible Captain Tylor, Emma: A Victorian Romance, and Junjo Romantica.

== Awards and recognition ==
- Association of Collegiate Entrepreneurs (ACE) North American Entrepreneur of the Year. ACE was a nonprofit founded in 1983 by Verne Harnish at Wichita State University to identify and support outstanding student and early-career entrepreneurs. Its alumni network gave rise to two lasting institutions: the Entrepreneurs' Organization (EO), a global peer network, and the Collegiate Entrepreneurs' Organization (CEO), with more than 250 university chapters.
- Inc. 500 (Right Stuf International, 1999, #369), recognizing the company among the 500 fastest-growing private companies in the United States.
- Des Moines Business Record 40 Under 40 (2009).
