= Shino & Ren =

Japanese yuri manga series

- First tankōbon volume cover

志乃と恋 (Shino to Ren)
- Genre: Yuri
- Manga
- Written by: Minori Chigusa
- Published by: Media Factory
- English publisher: NA: Yen Press Kadokawa (digital)
- Imprint: MF Comics
- Original run: November 1, 2021 – present
- Volumes: 6
- Light novel

Shino & Ren: Future
- Written by: Tsuzuro Hibi
- Illustrated by: Minori Chigusa
- Published by: Fujimi Shobo
- English publisher: NA: Yen Press
- Imprint: Fujimi Fantasia Bunko
- Original run: February 20, 2025 – present
- Volumes: 2

Shino & Ren (志乃と恋, Shino to Ren) is a Japanese yuri manga series written and illustrated by Minori Chigusa. It began serialization on Chigusa's social media in November 2021, and has been compiled into six volumes by Media Factory as of August 2026. A light novel adaptation written by Tsuzuro Hibi and illustrated by Chigusa is published by Fujimi Shobo under their Fujimi Fantasia Bunko imprint, with two volumes released as of October 2025.

== Plot ==
Shino Saotome and Ren Shirayuki are two schoolmates in a same-sex relationship. Shino is a beautiful student with an introverted personality, while Ren has a more tomboyish and fashionable look. Despite their contrasts, the two love each other very much, wanting the other to be happy.

== Characters ==
Shino Saotome (早乙女 志乃, Saotome Shino)
Ren's girlfriend and a student in the same year as her. She has a loner personality, but is still popular in school and has even been the subject of confessions. She and Ren later become classmates. In Shino & Ren Future, she is now 23-years old and works as a teacher. The two later start living together.
Ren Shirayuki (白雪 恋, Shirayuki Ren)
Shino's girlfriend. In contrast to Shino, who has a more reserved personality, Ren is more brash and tomboyish, having short black hair with red highlights and long painted nails, giving her a gyaru-like appearance. In Shino & Ren Future, she is now 22-years old and a popular model active under the name REN.

== Media ==
=== Manga ===
The series is written and illustrated by Minori Chigusa, who posted its chapters and artwork on her Twitter account beginning on November 1, 2021. It was later picked up for publication by Media Factory under its MF Comics label, which has compiled the chapters and art into tankōbon volumes. The series' chapters are also released on Kadokawa's KadoComi (formerly ComicWalker) web service. The first volume was released on August 23, 2023; six volumes have been released as of August 21, 2026. The series is licensed in English by Yen Press, which released the first volume physically on May 26, 2026; it is also published digitally on Kadokawa's BookWalker website from February 13, 2026.

| No. | Original release date | Original ISBN | North American release date | North American ISBN |
|---|---|---|---|---|
| 1 | August 23, 2023 | 978-4-04-682735-7 | May 26, 2026 | 979-8-8554-3296-1 |
| 2 | June 21, 2024 | 978-4-04-683597-0 | September 22, 2026 | 979-8-8554-3298-5 |
| 3 | February 21, 2025 | 978-4-04-684537-5 | March 23, 2027 | 979-8-8554-5159-7 |
| 4 | September 20, 2025 | 978-4-04-685155-0 | — | — |
| 5 | February 20, 2026 | 978-4-04-685687-6 | — | — |
| 6 | August 21, 2026 | 978-4-04-660396-8 | — | — |

=== Light novel ===
A light novel adaptation titled Shino & Ren: Future (志乃と恋Future) written by Tsuzuro Hibi and illustrated by Chigusa is published by Fujimi Shobo under their Fujimi Fantasia Bunko imprint. It is a sequel to the original manga, following Shino and Ren's lives as adults. The first volume was released on February 20, 2025, and the second volume was released on October 18, 2025. The light novel is also licensed in English by Yen Press, which will release the first volume physically in December 2026.

| No. | Original release date | Original ISBN | English release date | English ISBN |
|---|---|---|---|---|
| 1 | February 20, 2025 | 978-4-04-075818-3 | December 8, 2026 | 979-8-8554-3118-6 |
| 2 | October 18, 2025 | 978-4-04-076013-1 | — | — |

== Reception ==
It was reported on the light novel adaptation's official website that the series had over 120,000 copies in circulation.

== See also ==
- Convenient Semi-Friend, another manga series with the same author
- Futago Matomete "Kanojo" ni Shinai?, a light novel series with the same illustrator
- Jitsu wa Imōto Deshita, a light novel series illustrated with the same illustrator
