= Convenient Semi-Friend =

Japanese manga series

- First tankōbon volume cover

好都合セミフレンド (Kōtsugō Semi-Furendo)
- Genre: Yuri
- Manga
- Written by: Minori Chigusa
- Published by: Houbunsha
- English publisher: NA: Yen Press
- Imprint: Manga Time KR Comics
- Magazine: Manga Time Kirara
- Original run: May 9, 2023 – September 9, 2026
- Volumes: 4

Convenient Semi-Friend (好都合セミフレンド, Kōtsugō Semi-Furendo) is a Japanese four-panel manga series written and illustrated by Minori Chigusa. The series was serialized in Houbunsha's Manga Time Kirara magazine from May 2023 to September 2026. Four tankōbon volumes have been released as of April 2026.

== Plot ==
The series follows Suuna Kuruma, a high school student who has just moved into a new dorm. Upon arriving at her new room, she discovers a girl, Ruka Hamanasu, flirting with another girl. Suuna is surprised to see this happen, to which Ruka claims that they were not going out. She claims the other girl was her sefure (セフレ), which she says is short for "semi-friend". As Suuna has no other friends, Ruka offers to be her semi-friend.

== Characters ==
Suuna Kuruma (久留間 珠海, Kuruma Suuna)
A high school student and Ruka's roommate. She has a very shy personality and thus had been unable to make any friends prior to meeting Ruka. She is conscious of her name as its kanji is hard to read.
Ruka Hamanasu (浜薔薇 輝子, Hamanasu Ruka)
Suuna's roommate, whom she saw flirting with another girl during their first meeting. She claims the other girl is her sefure, but as Suuna is unfamiliar with the term, she claims it is short for "semi-friend". She has a gyaru personality.

== Publication ==
The series is written and illustrated by Minori Chigusa. It was originally released as a guest series in Houbunsha's Manga Time Kirara magazine, before being serialized from May 9, 2023, to September 9, 2026. The first tankōbon volume was released on December 26, 2023. To commemorate the volume's release, selected Gamers outlets featured a pop-up section selling series merchandise.

In December 2024, Yen Press announced that they had licensed the series for English publication.

No.	Original release date	Original ISBN	English release date	English ISBN
1	December 26, 2023	978-4-8322-9516-2	July 8, 2025	979-8-8554-0948-2
2	October 25, 2024	978-4-8322-9585-8	November 25, 2025	979-8-8554-1960-3
3	August 27, 2025	978-4-8322-9656-5	January 26, 2027	979-8-8554-3569-6
4	April 27, 2026	978-4-8322-9714-2	—	—
5	November 27, 2026	978-4-8322-9765-4	—	—

== Reception ==
The series was nominated for the 10th Next Manga Awards in 2024 in the print category.

== See also ==
- Futago Matomete "Kanojo" ni Shinai?, a light novel series illustrated by Minori Chigusa
- Jitsu wa Imōto Deshita, a light novel series illustrated by Minori Chigusa
- Shino & Ren, another manga series illustrated by Minori Chigusa
