= Futago Matomete "Kanojo" ni Shinai? =

Japanese light novel series and its franchise

- First light novel volume cover

双子まとめて『カノジョ』にしない?
- Genre: Romantic comedy
- Light novel
- Written by: Muku Shirai
- Illustrated by: Minori Chigusa
- Published by: Fujimi Shobo
- Imprint: Fujimi Fantasia Bunko
- Original run: November 17, 2023 – July 17, 2026
- Volumes: 7
- Manga
- Written by: Muku Shirai
- Illustrated by: Miso Ameiro
- Published by: Media Factory
- Imprint: MF Comics
- Magazine: Comic Alive+
- Original run: April 25, 2024 – present
- Volumes: 5

Futago Matomete "Kanojo" ni Shinai? (双子まとめて『カノジョ』にしない?; "Should I Make These Twins My Girlfriend?"), also known as Futagoma (ふたごま) for short, is a Japanese light novel series written by Muku Shirai and illustrated by Minori Chigusa. The series was published in seven volumes from November 2023 to July 2026 under Fujimi Shobo's Fujimi Fantasia Bunko imprint. A manga adaptation illustrated by Miso Ameiro began serialization on the Nico Nico Seiga and KadoComi websites under Media Factory's Comic Alive+ label in April 2024, with the series being compiled into five volumes as of September 2026.

== Characters ==
Sakuto Takayashiki (高屋敷 咲人, Takayashiki Sakuto)
A first-year high school student and the main protagonist.
Chikage Usami (宇佐見 千影, Usami Chikage)
Voiced by: Yoshino Aoyama (PV, voice comic)
The younger sister of the Usami twins.
Hikari Usami (宇佐見 光莉, Usami Hikari)
Voiced by: Minami Tanaka (PV, voice comic)
The elder sister of the Usami twins.
Matori Kosaka (高坂 真鳥, Kosaka Matori)
A second-year high school student and the vice-president of the Newspaper Club.
Wakana Higashino (東野 和香奈, Higashino Wakana)
A first-year high school student and the member of the Newspaper Club. She made her classmate, Hikari to join the club.
Ayaka Uehara (上原 彩花, Uehara Ayaka)
A third-year high school student and the head of the Newspaper Club.
Yuzuki Kusanagi (草薙 柚月, Kusanagi Yuzuki)
Sakuto's childhood friend.

== Media ==
=== Light novel ===
The light novel series is written by Muku Shirai and illustrated by Minori Chigusa and was published in seven volumes under Fujimi Shobo's Fujimi Fantasia Bunko imprint from November 17, 2023, to July 17, 2026. A promotional video featuring Minami Tanaka and Yoshino Aoyama as the Usami sisters was released in February 2024.

No.	Japanese release date	Japanese ISBN
1	November 17, 2023	978-4-04-075228-0
2	February 20, 2024	978-4-04-075382-9
3	June 20, 2024	978-4-04-075502-1
4	December 20, 2024	978-4-04-075667-7
5	May 20, 2025	978-4-04-075897-8
6	December 19, 2025	978-4-04-076107-7
7	July 17, 2026	978-4-04-076375-0

=== Manga ===
A manga adaptation illustrated by Miso Ameiro began serialization on KadoComi and Nico Nico Seiga services under the Comic Alive+ label on April 25, 2024. The manga has been compiled into five tankōbon volumes as of September 2026.

No.	Japanese release date	Japanese ISBN
1	August 28, 2024	978-4-04-074830-6
2	January 28, 2025	978-4-04-811415-8
3	July 28, 2025	978-4-04-811545-2
4	February 28, 2026	978-4-04-811827-9
5	September 28, 2026	978-4-04-972263-5

== See also ==
- Convenient Semi-Friend, a manga series by Minori Chigusa
- Jitsu wa Imōto Deshita, another light novel series written by Muku Shirai and illustrated by Minori Chigusa
- Shino & Ren, a manga series by Minori Chigusa
