= Anti-Magic Academy: The 35th Test Platoon =

Japanese light novel and its adaptations

- First light novel volume cover featuring the characters Ōka Ōtori (left) and Takeru Kusanagi (right)

対魔導学園35試験小隊 (Tai-Madō Gakuen Sango Shiken Shōtai)
- Genre: Military; Science fiction; Supernatural
- Light novel
- Written by: Tōki Yanagimi
- Illustrated by: Kippu
- Published by: Fujimi Shobo
- Imprint: Fujimi Fantasia Bunko
- Original run: May 19, 2012 – July 20, 2016
- Volumes: 13
- Manga
- Written by: Tōki Yanagimi
- Illustrated by: Sutarō Hanao
- Published by: Fujimi Shobo
- Magazine: Monthly Dragon Age
- Original run: November 9, 2012 – May 9, 2014
- Volumes: 3
- Manga
- Written by: Tōki Yanagimi
- Illustrated by: Yohei Yasumura
- Published by: Media Factory
- English publisher: NA: Seven Seas Entertainment
- Magazine: Monthly Comic Alive
- Original run: May 19, 2012 – July 20, 2016
- Volumes: 2
- Anime television series
- Directed by: Tomoyuki Kawamura
- Written by: Kento Shimoyama
- Music by: A-bee
- Studio: Silver Link
- Licensed by: Crunchyroll (streaming); AUS: Madman Entertainment; BI: Anime Limited (home video); NA: Discotek Media (home video)
- Original network: Tokyo MX, Sun TV, TVQ, Chiba TV, tvk, TV Saitama, GBS, MTV, BS11
- Original run: October 7, 2015 – December 23, 2015
- Episodes: 12
- icon

Anti-Magic Academy: The 35th Test Platoon (Japanese: 対魔導学園35試験小隊, Hepburn: Tai-Madō Gakuen Sango Shiken Shōtai) is a Japanese light novel series written by Tōki Yanagimi and illustrated by Kippu. Fujimi Shobo have published eleven volumes since May 2012 under their Fujimi Fantasia Bunko imprint. A manga adaptation with art by Sutarō Hanao was serialized in Fujimi Shobo's shōnen manga magazine Monthly Dragon Age between 2012 and 2014, and was collected in three tankōbon volumes. A second manga adaptation by Yohei Yasumura began serialization in Media Factory's seinen manga magazine Monthly Comic Alive from January 2015 and Seven Seas Entertainment published the manga in English. A 12-episode anime television series adaptation by Silver Link aired between October and December 2015.

== Plot ==
The Anti-Magic Academy is a training institution where students are organized into squads to train as Inquisitors, who are special operatives trained to suppress magical crimes and fight magic users. Takeru Kusanagi, a student who cannot use firearms and instead fights with a sword, is assigned as captain of the 35th Test Platoon, a low-ranked squad made up of misfits and problem students.

The platoon's members include specialists with different abilities but they struggle to function effectively as a unit. Their situation changes when Ouka Ootori, a highly skilled former Inquisitor who was demoted after killing a witch in violation of regulations, is reassigned to their platoon.

== Characters ==
Takeru Kusanagi (草薙 タケル, Kusanagi Takeru)
Voiced by: Yoshimasa Hosoya
The leader of the 35th Test Platoon. While inexperienced as a commanding officer, he always looks after the well-being of his squad and tries to make the new members feel welcome. He is the only male member of his team and every member of his team has some attraction towards him as he has promised to each of them separately that he would share half of their burdens. A master swordsman capable of slicing bullets, one of the few things that anger him is insulting that he prefers a katana and is no good with magic or guns. He forms a contract with the Relic Eater Lapis since his skills are impressive enough to use her full potential and like all other contractors, gains the ability to enter a state called "Demon Slayer Mode." At the end of the anime series, he enters a modified, more powerful state called "God Slayer Mode" to save his sister's life.
Ōka Ōtori (鳳 桜花, Ōtori Ōka)
Voiced by: Reina Ueda
A prodigy of the Inquisition who's demoted to 35th Test Platoon for excessive killing. Ouka excels at any type of combat, and possesses skills allowing her to act alone, she at first didn't care about teamwork, but eventually starts to trust her platoon. Since a Witch killed her family, she hates magic and witches (until ending), and that leads to a mutual disliking towards Mari. She has a temporary contract with a Relic Eater in the form of twin guns named Vlad. At the end of the anime series, she makes the contract permanent to protect Takeru's sister and prevent Takeru from killing her.
Usagi Saionji (西園寺 うさぎ, Saionji Usagi)
Voiced by: Rumi Ōkubo
The sniper of the thirty-fifth platoon. A girl from a high class family, she is very emotional and suffers from a horrible stage fright, that causes major incidents and mistakes. She wears an accessory in her hair that looks like rabbit ears which are her trademark, and is often teased by other members of the platoon. She uses the Barrett anti-materiel sniper rifle as her sniping weapon.
Ikaruga Suginami (杉並 斑鳩, Suginami Ikaruga)
Voiced by: Ryoko Shiraishi
A first year student at the academy, she is the mod-maker of the platoon. A genius when it comes to maintaining and creating weapons, fiddling with machines, and hacking. She often gathers intelligence via hacking, illegally remodels the unit's weapons, and sexually harasses others, as well as other countless troublesome activities.
Mari Nikaidō (二階堂 マリ, Nikaidō Mari)
Voiced by: Kanae Itō
A young witch previously affiliated with Valhalla, who tricked her into helping them out with their criminal activities. Possessor of『Aurora』ancient magic attribute, she specializes in high-powered destructive magic, and can cast restorative, summoning, and defensive magic. After her memory is erased by Haunted, she's put under the watch of the 35th Test Platoon.
Sōgetsu Ōtori (鳳 颯月, Ōtori Sōgetsu)
Voiced by: Shin-ichiro Miki
The eccentric Chairman of Anti-Magic Academy and the head of the Inquisitors of Heretics Office. He's also Ōka's guardian. He assigns Ouka to the 35th Test Platoon with a certain expectation.
Hayato Kurogane (鐵 隼人, Kurogane Hayato)
Voiced by: Kenjiro Tsuda
The strongest witch hunter.
Isuka Suginami (杉並 伊砂, Suginami Isuka)
Voiced by: Yūko Sanpei
Sister of Ikaruga Suginami. She was killed by Haunted.
Lapis (ラピス)
Voiced by: Iori Nomizu
A Human shaped "Relic Eater," or Magical Heritage girl known as Malleus Maleficarum Type-Twilight "Mistilteinn." Sōgetsu Ōtori has her assume the identity of Takeru's fictional sister to account for her presence in the school. Her transformation is restricted to any kind of bladed weapon, particularly swords. When Takeru is on the verge of death, she chooses him to become her host. She is normally very reserved and shows little expression, but the truth is she is very prideful, and she gets jealous whenever Takeru uses other weapons. Her name is the shortened form for lapis lazuli.
Haunted (ホーンテッド)
Voiced by: Kōji Yusa
A dangerous Magic user from Valhalla and former Catholic priest who used to work with Mari, until he framed her for murder and then erased her memory. He is a magician who can control dead spirits, perform summons, and perform alchemy, but his personal history is completely unknown. He loves despair, and his reason for living is to cause others to feel despair.
Nagaru Hoshijiro (星白 流, Hoshijiro Nagaru)
Voiced by: Natsumi Yamada
The 17-year-old student council president of the Anti-Magic Academy. She is very small so she doesn't look her age. She is cheerful and is always wearing a smiling expression.
Kiseki Kusanagi (草薙 キセキ, Kusanagi Kiseki)
Voiced by: Chika Anzai
She is the younger sister of Takeru Kusanagi. She is very strong and possesses the body of a demon. She also seems to have a "brother complex" shown when she gets jealous due to the other girls in his squad trying to gain his affection.

== Media ==
=== Light novel ===
The first light novel volume was published by Fujimi Shobo under their Fujimi Fantasia Bunko imprint on May 19, 2012. A total of thirteen volumes and one side story volume have been released, with the final volume released on July 20, 2016.

No.	Title	Release date	ISBN
1	Hero Summoning; Eiyū Shōkan (英雄召喚)	May 19, 2012	978-4-04-071082-2
2	Witch's Struggle; Majo Sōdatsu-sen (魔女争奪戦)	September 20, 2012	978-4-04-071079-2
3	The Two Alchemist; Renkinjutsushi Futari (錬金術師二人)	January 19, 2013	978-4-04-071080-8
4	Festival of Fools; Gusha-tachi no Gakuen-sai (愚者達の学園祭)	May 18, 2013	978-4-04-071033-4
5	King of One Hundred Demons; Hyakki no Ō (百鬼の王)	August 20, 2013	978-4-04-071083-9
6	Re-Contracting of the Azure; Ruri-iro no sai Keiyaku (瑠璃色の再契約)	December 20, 2013	978-4-04-712979-5
7	Crimson of Counter-Attack; Gyakushū no Guren (逆襲の紅蓮)	April 19, 2014	978-4-04-070097-7
8	Silvery Uprising; Shirogane Sōran (白銀争乱)	August 20, 2014	978-4-04-070138-7
9	Heretic Alliance; Itan Dōmei (異端同盟)	December 20, 2014	978-4-04-070429-6
10	The Witch Hunt War (Part I); Majokari Sensō (Ue) (魔女狩り戦争（上）)	April 18, 2015	978-4-04-070551-4
11	The Witch Hunt War (Part II); Majokari Sensō (Shita) (魔女狩り戦争（下）)	August 20, 2015	978-4-04-070550-7
12	Call of Twilight; Tasogare no Yobigoe (黄昏の呼び声)	March 19, 2016	978-4-04-070865-2
13	The Promise of Dawn; Akatsuki no Yakusoku (暁の約束)	July 20, 2016	978-4-04-072000-5

=== Manga ===
No.	Original release date	Original ISBN	English release date	English ISBN
1	August 22, 2015	978-4-0406-7575-6	November 28, 2017	978-1-626927-42-1
2	December 22, 2015	978-4-0406-7858-0	November 28, 2017	978-1-626927-42-1

=== Anime ===
A 12-episode anime television series adaptation by Silver Link aired between October 7 and December 23, 2015.

The series was streamed by Crunchyroll. It was also streamed in Australia and New Zealand on Madman Entertainment's AnimeLab platform. Discotek Media licensed the series for home video format in North America and released it on Blu-ray on March 31, 2020. Anime Limited licensed the series in the United Kingdom, releasing a Collector's Blu-ray edition on March 7, 2022.

==== Episodes ====
No.	Title (Note: All English titles are taken from Crunchyroll.)	Original release date
1	"Move Out! Small Fry Platoon!"; Transliteration: "Shutsugeki! Zako Shōtai!" (Japanese: 出撃！雑魚小隊！)	October 7, 2015
In a future timeline, a young man wielding a katana dies lamenting his brief life. In the present, Takeru Kusanagi is a student at the Anti-Magic Academy, training to become an Inquisitor who fights witches. He is captain of the 35th Test Platoon, its members including the stage-fright stricken sniper Usagi Saionji, the tech genius Ikaruga Suginami, and the newly assigned combat prodigy Oka Otori. During a mission, the team's poor coordination is exposed, though Takeru reveals his supreme skill with his katana. After the mission, Oka harshly criticizes the platoon's incompetence. She attempts to work alone but is accompanied by Takeru. After discovering a witch's human sacrifice, Oka tries to execute prisoners, confessing her hatred for magic and the witches who murdered her family. Takeru vows to become her trusted comrade. His actions are observed by a mysterious girl with glowing violet eyes.
2	"Summon the Hero"; Transliteration: "Eiyū Shōkan" (Japanese: 英雄召喚)	October 14, 2015
Takeru recalls Oka defeating him in a first-year war game. Oka learns a member of the 35th Platoon is a candidate for a Relic Eater, a legendary magical weapon. The observer, Lapis, a weapon in human form, hopes to form such a contract. Elsewhere, the young witch Mari Nikaido meets the Necromancer and Alchemist Haunted, who has murdered fifty people as sacrifices. Oka discovers Takeru's motivation for being an Inquisitor is purely financial. Haunted activates his spell, summoning an armored Einherjar—the resurrected soul of King Arthur wielding a magically infused Railgun—and commands it to free witches imprisoned beneath the Academy. Oka struggles against it and unwillingly uses magic to summon the twin pistols Vlad, with whom she has a temporary contract. The Chairman, Vlad's true master, reclaims the weapons, leaving Oka defenseless until Takeru intervenes. He is mortally wounded but is saved by Lapis, who forms a contract with him. She transforms into Witch Hunter Armor and an indestructible sword that absorbs magic. Takeru absorbs the Excalibur-infused power and destroys the Einherjar in a single move, impressing Haunted. He reassures Oka she is not alone before collapsing exhausted in her lap, a situation she finds not entirely unpleasant.
3	"A Witch Joins"; Transliteration: "Majo Nyūtai" (Japanese: 魔女入隊)	October 21, 2015
The Chairman enrolls the imprisoned, amnesiac Auroral Witch Mari Nikaido as a student to use her as bait for Valhalla. He reveals Lapis is a sword-type relic who chose Takeru for his skill and enrolls her in the 35th Platoon as his sister. The platoon is ordered to guard Mari, who is fitted with an explosive Gleipnir necklace to prevent magic use. Oka is outraged at protecting a witch, and she and Mari constantly clash, competing in physical and intellectual pursuits. Takeru treats Mari kindly, and she expresses a desire to use magic to help people. Elsewhere, her obsessive associate Haunted recalls violating their agreement by murdering students and framing her for it. After Takeru mediates a fight, Oka becomes jealous he uses Mari's first name. The platoon enters a mock battle tournament. As part of the Chairman's plot, Mari moves in with Takeru; a jealous Oka insists on joining them. The platoon struggles in the tournament's first round until Mari acts as a decoy to secure victory, earning Oka's grudging respect. While the team celebrates, Oka learns from the Chairman that Mari was a Valhalla member accused of murder.
4	"The Necromancer Laughs"; Transliteration: "Shiryōjutsushi wa Warau" (Japanese: 死霊術師は笑う)	October 28, 2015
Takeru believes Mari and Oka could become friends. Troubled by memory flashes, Mari fears a dark past, but Takeru promises to redeem her. Oka later informs him that Mari's murder accusation is inconsistent with the evidence. During the mock battle's second round, Haunted slaughters students and soldiers, traps the 35th Platoon behind a barrier, and declares his intent to kill Mari out of twisted love. Though Takeru activates his Relic Eater, Haunted, a superior swordsman wielding Dainsleif, gravely wounds him. Oka blackmails the Chairman, who concealed evidence proving Haunted's guilt, into a deal that includes deactivating Mari's explosive necklace. Haunted restores Mari's memory, revealing he manipulated her by holding her orphan friends hostage. Takeru exposes that the orphans are dead. Enraged, Mari casts a spell at Haunted but misses. With the necklace deactivated, Oka and a injured Usagi provide a distraction, allowing Mari to channel a powerful spell into Takeru's sword, which he uses to defeat Haunted. Before escaping, Haunted reveals knowledge of Takeru's Demon Hunter heritage. Grateful, Mari officially joins the academy and promptly resumes her rivalry with Oka.
5	"The Witch-Hunting Festival"; Transliteration: "Majokari-sai" (Japanese: 魔女狩り祭)	November 4, 2015
Facing an imminent arranged marriage due to poor grades, Usagi is further distressed by an encounter with her cruel fiancé, Reima Tenmyoji, the festival organizer who views her as property. Takeru comforts her and vows to help. Meanwhile, Student Council President Nagaru Hoshijiro recruits Oka to investigate the legendary witch Mephistopheles and its suspected connection to Reima, following a series of student murders. Takeru stays with a terrified Usagi, who refuses to release his hand even in sleep. Misinterpreting his protective offer to stay at his apartment, Usagi believes Takeru intends to get her pregnant to void the marriage and attempts to seduce him. They are interrupted by a jealous Mari, Oka, and Ikaruga, who punish Takeru. The team resolves to save Usagi by excelling in the Witch Hunting Festival to earn the extra credit needed to improve her grades, despite Ikaruga's embarrassing plans for a cosplay event.
6	"Even Bunnies Have Fangs"; Transliteration: "Usagi ni Datte Kiba wa Aru" (Japanese: うさぎにだって牙はある)	November 11, 2015
Oka uncovers a massive magic circle painted across the school by Reima Tenmyoji, designed for mental control. Reima reveals Usagi is a family outcast for accidentally killing her brother, but Takeru vows to protect her. Student Council President Nagaru Hoshijiro and her subordinate Shizuka confront Oka, only for Shizuka to reveal herself as the witch Mephistopheles. With Reima's aid, she possesses Oka's body, deactivates Mari's restraining necklace, and battles Oka's resisting soul. Nagaru informs Takeru that the academy holds Mephistopheles' original body. Usagi confronts her traumatic past and Reima's abuse, fighting back when he assaults her. Armed with her grandfather's rifle and Ikaruga's soul-destroying bullets, she assists as Mari works to dismantle the circle. Though Mephistopheles curses Usagi with a lust spell, Takeru defeats Reima. In a critical moment, Oka's soul temporarily regains control, allowing Usagi to fire two shots: one expelling the witch from Oka, the other destroying Mephistopheles' soul. The platoon's subsequent cosplay café fails due to the girls' harsh service. Usagi announces her engagement is canceled, crediting Takeru, who rewards her with a grateful head pat. Learning of the Lost Matrix, the Chairman resolves to speak with Ikaruga about her family.
7	"Traitor"; Transliteration: "Uragirimono" (Japanese: 裏切者)	November 18, 2015
The Chairman reveals the Lost Matrix, the last cell of a Dark Elf, to Ikaruga, a genetically engineered former agent of the rogue Alchemist Company who stole it years prior. When the 35th Platoon faces failure, Ikaruga abruptly leaves to bargain with her sister Isuka of Valhalla, offering the cell for access to Dark Elf research. Takeru and the others pursue her through the sewers, rescuing her from mercenaries but becoming separated. Ikaruga takes a wounded Takeru to a safehouse, threatening to destroy the cell if her friends are harmed. Meanwhile, the Chairman declares war on the rogue lab after Alchemist disavows it, mobilizing his entire force. Oka, Mari, and Usagi are captured by Isuka, who learns through flashbacks that Ikaruga once created a powerless Wood Elf daughter named Kanaria, motivating her theft. When Takeru questions her goal of resurrecting the Dark Elves, Ikaruga disrobes, resolved to experience sex before her potential death.
8	"Two Alchemists"; Transliteration: "Renkinjutsushi Futari" (Japanese: 錬金術師二人)	November 25, 2015
Interrupted by Alchemist helicopters, Ikaruga drugs Takeru after a confession and kiss, promising "sex later". Meanwhile, Mari, Oka, and Usagi are freed by the Chairman, who authorizes their Relic Eaters and leads an assault on the rogue lab. Takeru purges the drug, activates his Witch Hunter armor, and battles through Alchemist forces with Oka, while Usagi and Mari provide sniper support. Inside, Ikaruga confronts her sister Isuka, who was modified to feel pain with any emotion. Rather than surrender the Dark Elf cell, Ikaruga reveals she used nanomachines to alter her own DNA, transforming into a Dark Elf. She creates an Antimatter bomb to destroy the lab and save Isuka. Haunted intervenes, stabbing Isuka. Ikaruga detonates the bomb, destroying the top floor. Her attempts to heal Isuka fail, but Isuka reveals Ikaruga's created daughter, Kanaria, is alive with Valhalla before dying. As Haunted summons a mechanical dragon, Takeru saves Ikaruga. With Oka injured and Takeru's magic depleted, Mari transfers her power to his sword, allowing the final blow. Grieving but resolved to find Kanaria, Ikaruga accepts Takeru's promise of help and a comforting head pat.
9	"The 35th Drunken Platoon and Crazy Summer Time"; Transliteration: "Kureijī Samā Taimu" (Japanese: クレイジーサマータイム)	December 2, 2015
Undercover at a Gentlemen's Club to stop an artifact trade, the 35th Platoon fails when Oka assaults the wrong target. The seized ring, nearly worthless, emits a drunkenness spell when stuck on Takeru's finger. The girls succumb: Usagi acts infantile, Mari exposes herself, Oka becomes giddy, and Ikaruga vomits on Takeru after a romantic advance. Investigating unnatural summer weather at the beach, they identify a magical Sea Hare as the culprit. While Takeru is indisposed and others are incapacitated, Usagi, Mari, and Lapis are molested by the creature during a failed fishing attempt. Takeru returns, and with Mari's magic temporarily unleashed, they defeat it. Oka rewards the three with ice cream for their success.
10	"Kusanagi Kiseki"; Transliteration: "Kusanagi kiseki" (Japanese: 草薙キセキ)	December 9, 2015
Takeru visits his younger sister Kiseki in a maximum-security prison. She adores him but grows jealous upon learning of his female teammates. The Chairman explains her terrifying condition: Kiseki possesses a demonic body that dissolves and absorbs all matter, threatening the planet. To control this, she is routinely killed and resurrected. Upset by Takeru's new life, her power surges, transforming her into a horned demon. She later escapes, murdering a wizard Takeru was pursuing and absorbing him. When the platoon discovers them, Takeru reveals she is the world's highest-threat witch. Ikaruga diagnoses her with Overflow Syndrome, her magic too potent for a Gleipnir to contain. Resigned, Takeru agrees to surrender her to the Inquisitors. Oka suggests a final hour together, and the girls dress Kiseki for a brother-sister date. After a pleasant time, Kiseki makes her heartbreaking request: she asks Takeru to kill her.
11	"Kusanagi Takeru"; Transliteration: "Kusanagi Takeru" (Japanese: 草薙タケル)	December 16, 2015
Kiseki confesses her escalating power frightens her, as it manifests her darkest wishes for death and destruction. She pleads for Takeru to end her life, but he refuses, vowing to protect her until the day he must kill them both. Pursued by Valhalla and attacked by the relic-wielding Kyoya, Takeru defends her until Kurogane and Dragoons intervene. Re-imprisoned and fitted with a Gleipnir, Kiseki extracts a final promise from Takeru before being sedated. For his interference, Takeru is confined. The Chairman reveals plans to transfer Kiseki to a secret Alchemist facility. Valhalla attacks a decoy transport while the real convoy is ambushed. Flashbacks reveal Takeru's tragic family history: his clan systematically killed demon-born daughters, but Kiseki was born immortal. After she killed their father, Takeru swore to protect her. Freed by Nagaru and his platoon, Takeru races to stop Kyoya, now insane from his relic, from murdering Kiseki. After driving Kyoya off, the Chairman observes that Kiseki's immortality is sustained by her singular wish to die only by Takeru's hand. Haunted suddenly stabs Takeru, provoking Kiseki's catastrophic loss of control. Her power erupts, and she begins absorbing everything, growing to a colossal size.
12	"Supreme Wish"; Transliteration: "Kagirinaki negai" (Japanese: 限りなき願い)	December 23, 2015
Kiseki grows uncontrollably, absorbing the city while the Chairman and Alchemist Chairwoman Suzuka Suginami observe, wagering on Takeru's choice. To rescue Takeru from Haunted, Oka fully contracts with Vlad, gaining Witch Hunter armor. Haunted is absorbed by Kiseki. Trapped, the wounded Takeru is confronted in a dream by Lapis, who consumes part of his soul to unlock God Hunter mode, reminding him of his vow to sacrifice his humanity. Awakening in immense power, he orders the platoon to safety as his soul erodes. He confronts Kiseki, now blaming him for her suffering. Amid their emotional conflict, her form destabilizes. Takeru defeats Haunted, plunges into Kiseki's core, and separates her from the demonic mass without killing her. Valhalla retreats. Orochi chastises the centuries-old Chairman for manipulating Takeru to reignite an ancient war. Though guilt-ridden over Kiseki's inevitable return to captivity, Takeru is reassured by his teammates, who vow to share his burdens.

== See also ==
- No-Rin, another light novel series by the same illustrator
