= The Third =

Japanese light novel series

- The Third: The Girl with the Blue Eye

ザ・サード～蒼い瞳の少女～ (Za Sādo – Aoi Hitomi no Shōjo)
- Light novel
- Written by: Ryo Hoshino
- Illustrated by: Nao Goto
- Published by: Fujimi Shobo
- Imprint: Fujimi Fantasia Bunko
- Magazine: Dragon Magazine
- Original run: September 1999 – present
- Volumes: 18
- Anime television series
- Directed by: Jun Kamiya
- Produced by: Yuusuke Abe; Takatoshi Chino; Takashi Noto; Michiko Suzuki; Takashi Tachizaki; Tsuneo Takechi
- Written by: Shinsuke Onishi
- Music by: Megumi Oohashi
- Studio: Xebec
- Licensed by: NA: Nozomi Entertainment
- Original network: WOWOW
- Original run: April 13, 2006 – October 26, 2006
- Episodes: 24
- Manga
- Written by: Ryo Hoshino
- Illustrated by: Ariko Ito
- Published by: Kadokawa Shoten
- Magazine: Monthly Dragon Age
- Original run: December 2005 – December 2006
- Volumes: 2

The Third (Japanese: ザ・サード, Hepburn: Za Sādo) is a light novel series, that has also been made into manga and anime series by Ryo Hoshino and illustrated by Ariko Ito. The anime series goes under the name The Third: Aoi Hitomi no Shōjo (ザ・サード～蒼い瞳の少女～, Za Sādo – Aoi Hitomi no Shōjo; "The Third: The Girl with the Blue Eye"). According to the New York Comic Convention, The Third has been licensed by Kadokawa Pictures U.S.A. and is distributed by Nozomi Entertainment for U.S. release. The anime was released in summer of 2007.

== Plot ==
The series is set many years after a devastating war, which killed off 80% of the Earth's population. Earth is being watched by a group of beings known as The Third from a futuristic city called Hyperius. They are named after a red jewel-like eye on their forehead (Space Eye) that serves as a port for data access and other forms of communication. These beings are committed to protecting the humans from harm. One of the main ways to protect the humans is to control the amount of "technos" or technology that the humans have access to, known as the "technos taboo". Humans found using forbidden technos could be arrested and or killed by The Third's best "auto-enforcer" an AI robot named Bluebreaker.

It follows the adventures of Honoka, a 17-year-old-(15 years old in the manga) girl who is human, but was born with a third eye as well-(which is blue instead of red), which she keeps concealed with a red bandanna. The Third found that she could not interface with the rest of The Third and so declared her a mutation and left her with her human parents who then had her sent to live with her adoptive grandfather Walken-(who is not related by blood) and his caravan in order to give her a chance of a normal life. Her third eye enables her to see Chi and use it to find cloaked enemies and sense the emotions of all living things.

Honoka is a jack-of-all-trades who travels throughout the barren earth with the help of a sand tank operated by Bogie, an AI guardian given to her by her late grandfather. She earns a living by doing various jobs with the tank, like ridding areas of oversized spiders, ants, as well as other creatures, and escorting or transporting clients. One night while traveling through the desert, she comes upon a strange blonde-haired man named Iks ("eeks"). He arrived on the planet for a purpose which is not made clear to her or the viewers until the last episode. The Third is also nervous about his arrival and fears he may seek to harm the humans. In order to understand the world more, Iks contracts with Honoka to accompany her for most of her travels. During travel or at night, she recites poems by a writer named "Dona Myfree" (exact spelling unknown at this time).

Various other characters are woven in to bring out more of Honoka's character and virtues. She grows over the episodes into a person whose personality becomes critical to the very survival of the planet.

== Characters ==
Honoka (火乃香)
Voiced by: Megumi Toyoguchi (Japanese); Anna Morrow (English)
She is a jack-of-all-trades that will do any job except assassinate another human. Honoka wields a katana-(that once belonged to her late grandfather) and a pair of guns, which she uses for battles; since childhood, she has practically spent most of her life in the desert with her adoptive grandfather Walken who has also given her weapon training-(including sword fighting) at a very young age and taught her everything that she knows about the natural surroundings of the world around her. After Walken passed away sometime later, Honoka parted ways from Walken's caravan and started her journeys traveling with Bogie. Honoka is known as the Sword Dancer (ソード・ダンサー, Sōdo Dansā) because of her graceful moves with her katana. She is also shown to be a gun fanatic, usually spending all of her money from her latest mission on guns and other weapons, much to Bogie's annoyance/chagrin.
Honoka also has a third eye similar to The Third, but this eye is blue rather than red and keeps it hidden with a red bandanna. She does not have the abilities that The Third have, but with the blue eye, she is able to detect life forces and sense other things in her environment. She is 17 years old in the anime and 15 in the manga (which appears to take place before the anime). She is incredibly strong, as by the end of the anime series she is able to take down a large army via utilizing her abilities to cause a cone of force that hurls multiple ton armored fighting vehicles, assumably in a similar weight class to modern MBTs, into the air. For reference, a modern MBT weighs around 60 tons, with tanks like the M1 Abrams weighing 68 tons.
Iks (イクス, Ikusu)
Voiced by: Daisuke Namikawa (Japanese); Steve Cannon (English)
He is the mysterious, seemingly young individual that Honoka meets early in the series. Iks has a calm and trusting persona, appearing to be harmless. However, he is sought after by The Third since no one knows his purpose or intentions. He has special powers of healing and is later revealed to be a visiting alien sent to observe the Earth. In the end it is revealed that he is the Arbitrator, who has come to make a decision about the Earth. He has also fallen in love with Honoka.
Bogie (ボギー, Bogī)
Voiced by: Unshou Ishizuka (Japanese); Jamieson Price (English)
A robotic mind that acts a guardian, advisor and support for Honoka; he was appointed by Walken to guard and protect Honoka from any harm since she was a child, even serving as a parental figure towards her-(this shows his caring side for her) as there have been multiple times where he'll get concerned and worried for her safety and health. His actual unit is a metal oblong container with a green visor, which is where his intelligence is contained. Appears to be sentient to an extent and is often serviced at the hospital in Emporium. He will state Honoka's flaws bluntly, as well as reprimand her after spending all her money on guns, usually annoying her. He is a very skilled fighter, as he was able to defeat an anti-tank helicopter by himself. His name is a pun, as a bogie is a tank component. His armament consists of a large caliber cannon which has a very high rate of fire for such weapons, six machine guns in side emplacements, three on each side, in what appear to be simplified RWS mounts. As well, he has two dorsal rotary gun turrets that serve as CIWS guns. The machine guns fold away behind armor panels when not in use, and the main gun turret turns and is enclosed by armored panels that cover it when not in use. Bogie appears to be rather heavily armored. He survives autocannon fire without any visible damage, and continues to be operable even after detonation of ammunition by a penetrating hit dealt by an ATGM from an Anti Tank Attack helicopter.
Zankan (ザンカン)
Voiced by: Masahiko Tanaka (Japanese); Wayne Grayson (English)
He is one of the best mechanics around and regularly services Honoka's sand tank; many years ago, his wife-(Millie's mother) was killed during a raid enforcing the technos taboo by the Inspection Force while which one of his customers in a panicked state started a shootout, leading a stray bullet to hit Zankan's wife and caused her death. He travels about with his young daughter Millie in a huge boxy armored crane, and is apparently an acquaintance of Honoka. He was killed by Blue Breaker because of repeatedly breaking the Technos Taboo near the beginning of the anime.
Joganki (浄眼機, Jōganki)
Voiced by: Takehito Koyasu (Japanese); Patrick Seitz (English)
One of The Third and very interested in Honoka. He keeps tabs on her from time to time and wields considerable political power within The Third. He is later captured by Rona Fauna, and held prisoner.
Millie (ミリィ, Mirī)
Voiced by: Yuki Sakata (Japanese); Angora Deb (English)
Zankan's daughter who has been traveling with her widowed father and helps him run his mechanical business; when she was only a baby, her mother was killed during a shootout involving a customer and some soldiers from the Inspection Force, leading Zankan to raise Millie by himself. She is cheerful and likes Honoka as if she were her older sister, usually calling her Hono-chan. Currently, she is traveling with Honoka, Iks, and Bogie after her father was killed by a Blue Breaker for breaking techno taboo, thus leaving her an orphan. She now attends school in Emporium and lives with her father's sister Esmel, who has become her legal guardian. She has basic firearms training, and briefly possessed a handgun that was superficially similar to a Tokarev.
Toy Joey (トイジョーイ, Toi Jōi)
Voiced by: Yuji Ueda (Japanese); Sam Regal (English)
A youth that meets Honoka in the first episode and is a mechanic to the sand tank, Bogie, that Honoka owns, as well as a few others. He wishes to follow in the footsteps of "Pops" (Zankan). For this, he attends a technical school while working for Honoka's team. He has obvious feelings for Honoka, and usually gets jealous when she talks to Iks. Near the end of the anime, while trying to invent a way to improve Bogie, her tank, he breaks the Techno Taboo which causes him to be banned from being a mechanic.
Paifu (パイフウ, Paifū)
Voiced by: Sanae Kobayashi (Japanese); Carol Jacobanis (English)
A health teacher from Millie's school who takes an apparently sexual interest in Honoka. When she travelled with Honoka, she revealed that she can too can also sense chi. She also displays an open hatred towards men and carries a gun around with her. Despite her hatred of men, near the end of the anime she helps Iks with his feelings towards Honoka, later commenting after doing so "it's like a wife helping her husband find his mistress". Honoka often refers to her as Sensei, since she herself never went to school.
Leon (レオン, Reon)
Voiced by: Naoya Uchida (Japanese); Troy Baker (English)
A cyborg from the Great War. He is a hunter out to merge with Allies of the Monster Troop to grow stronger. His body is made from a mysterious liquid metal and can shoot laser beams from his finger. In order to keep from deteriorating he forcibly assimilates other allies from the Monster Troop as well to keep his nanomachines stable. He is later killed by Honoka in a duel, where she disrupts his ability to regenerate.

== Episodes ==
No.	Title	Original release date
1	"Sword Dancer" "Sword Dancer" (Japanese: ソード・ダンサー)	April 13, 2006
Honoka is traveling in the desert when she stumbles upon a young man about to be ambushed by desert creatures. She and her companion AI, Bogie, rescue the young man and learn that his name is Iks.
2	"A Busy Night" "An Eventful Night" (Japanese: 慌しい一夜)	April 20, 2006
Honoka goes to Zankan, a friend and mechanic, to have her sand tank inspected. We also meet Jouganki, a Third with a strange connection to Honoka.
3	"Town of the Desert" "Desert Town" (Japanese: 砂漠の街)	April 27, 2006
Honoka does some mundane jobs in the desert town of Emporium to earn some money.
4	"Blue Breaker" "Blue Breaker" (Japanese: 蒼い殺戮者)	May 11, 2006
Honoka receives a PSP Suit from Zankan, but as Honoka leaves, a Blue Breaker kills Zankan.
5	"The Blue Space Eye" "The Blue Astral Eye" (Japanese: 蒼い天宙眼)	May 18, 2006
Honoka and Millie struggle to comprehend Zankan's Death.
6	"The Wind that Blows Toward the Earth" "The Wind That Sweeps The Land" (Japanese: 大地に吹く風)	May 25, 2006
Honoka fights the Blue Breaker that killed Zankan.
7	"Straight Until Dawn" "Until Dawn" (Japanese: 夜明けまで)	June 15, 2006
Honoka attempts to protect a queen ant from enemies until it is strong enough to fly away.
8	"An Afternoon In Emporium" "An Afternoon In Emporium" (Japanese: エンポリウムの午後)	June 22, 2006
Herds of sand dragons in the desert are stampeding for an unknown reason. A teacher at a school in Emporium possesses a strange power. The Third are investigating a crisis regarding a dimensional distortion.
9	"Paifu" "Paife" (Japanese: パイフウ)	June 29, 2006
Having been employed to search for the reason behind the fright of the sand dragons, Honoka goes off to the desert. Paifu joins Honoka as a partner. In the night, they have to deal with assassins after Paifu.
10	"Desert's Tombstone" "Gravestone" (Japanese: 砂漠の墓碑)	July 6, 2006
The expedition group reaches the dimensional distortion, which is called Gravestone.
11	"Fight with the Illusion" "Battling Against Illusion" (Japanese: 幻影との戦い)	July 13, 2006
The dimensional distortion engulfs the group and traps them in an interdimensional threshold. Honoka and Iks both disappeared.
12	"Their Respective Reason" "Their Respective Reasons" (Japanese: それぞれの理由)	July 20, 2006
Gravestone tries to kill each separated individual.
13	"Desert's Folklore" "Desert Folklore" (Japanese: 砂漠の伝説)	July 27, 2006
Honoka takes a break from work by traveling in the desert with Millie and Iks.
14	"Fairy Hallucination" "Fairy Visions" (Japanese: 妖精幻視)	August 3, 2006
Millie was rescued by a fairy and wolf when attacked by a monster in the desert.
15	"Night of the Sandstorm" "Night Of The Sandstorm" (Japanese: 砂嵐の夜)	August 10, 2006
The group search for the fairy and the wolf. Honoka opposes Leon's search for the fairy and is almost killed.
16	"The Life which Dances Boisterously" "Life Dancing Wildly" (Japanese: 乱舞する生命)	August 17, 2006
Honoka is healed by Kamui the wolf. When they resume their search for the fairy, they encounter Leon again.
17	"Rona Fauna" "Rona Fauna" (Japanese: ローナ・ファウナ)	August 24, 2006
Rona Fauna, one of Third, has seized control of the wormhole drive weapon and is holding Jouganki prisoner. Honoka has been asked to rescue him.
18	"Engage" "Engage" (Japanese: 発動)	August 31, 2006
Two unexpected individuals join Honoka's rescue team.
19	"Force Breaking" "Breaking Through Enemy Lines" (Japanese: 強行突破)	September 7, 2006
Honoka gets separated from Bogie and Paifu and has to join forces with Blue Breaker.
20	"Over the Dead Line" "Facing Down Death" (Japanese: 死線を越えて)	September 28, 2006
Paifu and Bogie defeat their opponents. Rona Fauna becomes very weak from overusing her powers and becomes unable to control her powers.
21	"Feelings That Won't Reach You" "Emotions That Fall Short" (Japanese: 届かぬ思い)	October 5, 2006
Rona expresses her love for Jouganki and her jealousy for Honoka.
22	"Mirage of A Past Soul" "The Mirage Of A Soul Never To Return" (Japanese: 還らざる魂の蜃気楼)	October 12, 2006
Rona has a showdown with Honoka and the wormhole driver is activated to destroy the entire planet.
23	"To The Steel Valley" "To The Steel Gorge" (Japanese: 鋼の谷へ)	October 19, 2006
Both Iks and Honoka, for different reasons head to the Steel Gorge and face the Third.
24	"The Story Starts from Now" "The Story That Begins Here" (Japanese: これから始まる物語)	October 26, 2006
Jouganki, Iks and Honoka go into the crevasse of the Steel Gorge to meet the Observer of the planet.
