= I Kept Pressing the 100-Million Button and Came Out on Top =

Japanese light novel series

- First light novel volume cover

一億年ボタンを連打した俺は、気付いたら最強になっていた ～落第剣士の学院無双～ (Ichiokunen Button o Rendashita Ore wa, Kidzuitara Saikyou ni Natteita ~Rakudai Kenshi no Gakuin Musou~)
- Genre: Adventure, fantasy, science fiction
- Novel series
- Written by: Shuichi Tsukishima
- Published by: Shōsetsuka ni Narō
- Original run: February 1, 2019 – present
- Light novel
- Written by: Shuichi Tsukishima
- Illustrated by: Mokyu
- Published by: Fujimi Shobo
- English publisher: NA: Yen Press
- Imprint: Fujimi Fantasia Bunko
- Original run: October 19, 2019 – present
- Volumes: 10
- Manga
- Written by: Shuichi Tsukishima
- Illustrated by: Shidō Yuutarō
- Published by: Kadokawa Shoten
- English publisher: NA: Yen Press
- Magazine: Young Ace Up
- Original run: February 25, 2020 – present
- Volumes: 10

I Kept Pressing the 100-Million Button and Came Out on Top (一億年ボタンを連打した俺は、気付いたら最強になっていた ～落第剣士の学院無双～, Ichiokunen Button o Rendashita Ore wa, Kidzuitara Saikyou ni Natteita ~Rakudai Kenshi no Gakuin Musou~) is a Japanese light novel series written by Shuichi Tsukishima and illustrated by Mokyu. It began serialization online in February 2019 on the user-generated novel publishing website Shōsetsuka ni Narō. It was later acquired by Fujimi Shobo who published the series in print since October 2019 under their Fujimi Fantasia Bunko imprint. A manga adaptation with art by Shidō Yuutarō has been serialized online via Kadokawa Shoten's Young Ace Up website since February 2020. Both the light novel and manga are licensed in North America by Yen Press.

== Synopsis ==
Allen Rodol is an untalented hard-worker, who is on the verge of flunking out of Grand Swordcraft Academy. His class prodigy Doriel, challenges him to a duel where it's win or face expulsion. However, the night before his duel, a mysterious hermit grants him a button that will give him one hundred million years to train in an alternate reality when pressed. Allen with all his doubts presses that button, after experiencing its effect he kept pushing the button many times.

== Characters ==
Allen Rodol (アレン・ロドーレ, Aren Rodōre)
Voiced by: Natsuki Hanae (drama CD)
Known as "Reject Swordsman", Allen is a fifteen-year-old young man and has pitch black hair and sharp brown eyes. He was constantly denied by teachers and other students. His only reason to tolerate such treatment was because of his mother who struggled so much to provide for him and enroll him into school. Despite his calm and composed nature, Allen can lose his temper if someone badmouths his parents, which led him to duel Dodriel Barton. As he was training with his sword to prepare himself for the duel he encounters a mysterious and old looking person who called himself the Hermit of Time, who gives Allen a mysterious button which takes him to another world that provides 100 million years time for training. Allen pushes the button fourteen or fifteen times until he has trained for well over a billion years. (Note: Volume 1, Chapter 1, Page 21.) He gains so much experience and becomes strong enough that he gets invited to "Thousand Blade Academy".
Lia Vesteria (リア・ヴェステリア, Ria Vuesuteria)
Voiced by: Ayana Taketatsu (drama CD)
Lia is the Princess of the Vesteria Kingdom, and current host of the Primordial Dragon King, Fafnir. Her affiliated school is the High King Style. She is currently a student at the Thousand Blade Academy, where she first became classmate then roommate of Allen Rodol, after losing in a duel against him, where the loser must obey the winner. She is a beautiful and gentle fifteen-year-old girl with a more voluptuous figure, clear blue eyes, and snow white skin; she has long blonde hair tied into twin tails using wine-red colored ribbon. She appears to be feisty, hot-blooded, and quick to anger, possibly due to her sheltered upbringing, as she was shown arguing with Allen, after he accidentally walked in on her dressing and even going as far as to want him to tarnish as her slave. After the misunderstanding is solved, she gradually openly talks kindly to him. She is exceptionally feminine and straightforward to Allen and later developed strong feelings for him.
Rose Valencia (ローズ・バレンシア, Rōzu Barenshia)
Voiced by: Sora Amamiya (drama CD)
Rose is the 17th generation legitimate successor of the secret art, Sakura Blossom One-Sword Style, and bounty hunter. She is a beautiful and dignified fifteen-year-old young girl with a slender build and red eyes and silver hair mixed with pink, extending to her back. Despite being hailed as a genius, Rose doesn't show the same arrogance or cockiness as others, instead being seen as a kind and calm woman popular around her hometown. She has a strong believe in hard work whenever it comes to swordsmanship, not looking down on Allen, who uses a self-taught form. Preferring to remain calm and patient, it is rare to see Rose losing her temper in a situation. She also has a strong sense of right and wrong, doing whatever it takes to defend the innocent and do the right thing. Underneath her cool and calm exterior, she does have a burning fighting spirit and a competitive streak, which is often shown during her interactions with Allen and Lia. A notable weakness of hers is being unable to wake up in the morning, being somewhat sluggish in classes until she completely wakes up. Similar to Lia, Rose has developed strong feelings for Allen, often acting out of character when she receives praise from him.
Reia Lasnote (レイア・ラスノード, Reia rasunōdo)
She is the president of one of the Five Academy in the capital, the "Thousand Blade Academy". She is a cunning person who knows how take the advantage of the situation. Although being trickster, Reia is rather weak at brain work and not so good with talks. When she was still young, A large criminal organization called "Scarlet Rain", injured a swordsman who can be said to be Reia's best friend. When she heard the news, she indignantly ignored the opposition from everyone around her, and stormed the organization's headquarters alone. As a result, the Scarlet Rain, which the Holy Knights had difficulties with for many years, was destroyed in just one night. It is one of Reia's most famous acts of valour.
No.18 (Nanbā 18)
A servant in charge of Reia's miscellaneous matters. He is A class criminal who has been sentenced to imprisonment with hard labour for 100 years because of peeping in girls' bath several times. Though he is pervert, No.18 is an alumnus of Thousand Blade Academy and a fine swordsman.
Ferris Dorhein (フェリス・ドラハイン, Ferisu dorahain)
She is the president of one of the Five Academy in the capital, the "Ice King Academy". Ferris is sly and cunning, and on top of that, she hates losing to Reia the most.
Shido Jukurius (シドユークリウス, Shido yūkuriusu)
He was originally an orphan born in a slum, and they met by chance at various occasions, and Ferris protected him since he was five years old at the time. After that, he grew up a little naughty because of giving him too much freedom, but Ferris really loved him. Shido also feels a strong debt of gratitude to Ferris, who brought him up, and calls her Miss. He has sharp ears which can even hear a low and cold tone voice. He gets angry if someone ridiculed him and he doesn't hesitate to kill them.
Dodriel Barton (ドドリエル・バートン, Dodorieru bāton)
He is the eldest son of the House of Baron Barton. He is an arrogant spoiled child who look down on people below him. He has blue hair trailing behind his back. He used to scorned Allen Rodol as a Failed Person. After the duel with Allen, his blue hair which was severely damaged, tied behind a well-featured face. And there was a large sword scar running across his well-featured face.

== Media ==
=== Light novel ===
The light novel series is written by Shuichi Tsukishima and illustrated by Mokyu. It began serialization online in February 2019 on the user-generated novel publishing website Shōsetsuka ni Narō. It was later acquired by Fujimi Shobo, who have published ten volumes since October 2019 under their Fujimi Fantasia Bunko imprint. The light novel is licensed in North America by Yen Press.

No.	Original release date	Original ISBN	English release date	English ISBN
1	October 19, 2019	978-4-04-073318-0	November 9, 2021	978-1-9753-2234-2
Chapter 1: The 100-Million-Year Button & the World of Time; Chapter 2: The Reject Swordsman & the Swordcraft Academy; Chapter 3: The Black and White Princess & Soul Attire; Chapter 4: Thousand Blade Academy & the Holy Festival; Chapter 5: Ice King Academy & a Battle to the Death
2	December 20, 2019	978-4-04-073319-7	April 5, 2022	978-1-9753-2236-6
Chapter 1: The Witchblade Guild & the Black Organization; Chapter 2: Conflict at School; Chapter 3: Recruiting & the Group of Weirdos; Chapter 4: Unexpected Encounters at Summer Training Camp; Chapter 5: The Vesteria Royal Guard
3	February 20, 2020	978-4-04-073587-0	August 16, 2022	978-1-9753-2238-0
Chapter 1: Vesteria Kingdom & the Captain of the Royal Guard; Chapter 2: A New Semester & the First-Year Tourney; Chapter 3: The Wanted Man & an Awakening
4	June 19, 2020	978-4-04-073648-8; 978-4-04-073647-1 (SE)	November 22, 2022	978-1-9753-4316-3
Chapter 1: Darkness & The Sword Master Festival; Chapter 2: Top Secrets & The Thousand Blade Festival; Chapter 3: The Five Powers & The Thirteen Oracle Knights; Bonus Chapter: Allen Countermeasure Meeting
5	October 17, 2020	978-4-04-073813-0	May 23, 2023	978-1-9753-4318-7
Chapter 1: Strange Times at White Lily Girls Academy; Chapter 2: The Senior Holy Knights & the Land of Sunshine
6	February 20, 2021	978-4-04-073814-7	October 24, 2023	978-1-9753-4320-0
Chapter 1: The Transfer Student & Christmas; Chapter 2: An Invitation & a Demon; Chapter 3: The Allen Cell & a Political Marriage
7	June 18, 2021	978-4-04-074143-7	April 16, 2024	978-1-9753-4322-4
Chapter 1: A Political Marriage; Chapter 2: Valentine's Day; Chapter 3: Cherin, the Land of Sakura
8	November 20, 2021	978-4-04-074144-4	August 20, 2024	978-1-9753-7009-1
Chapter 1: Cherin, the Land of Sakura & the Seven Holy Blades
9	April 20, 2022	978-4-04-074446-9	December 17, 2024	978-1-9753-7011-4
Chapter 1: A Deadly Battle; Chapter 2: A Meeting at the Palace & Going Home
10	March 17, 2023	978-4-04-074687-6	June 10, 2025	978-1-9753-9716-6
Chapter 1: The New Semester; Chapter 2: The Sword Master Festival; Chapter 3: Assault

=== Manga ===
A manga adaptation with art by Shidō Yuutarō has been serialized online via Kadokawa Shoten's Young Ace Up website since February 2020. It has been collected in ten tankōbon volumes. The manga is also licensed in North America by Yen Press.

No.	Original release date	Original ISBN	English release date	English ISBN
1	October 26, 2020	978-4-04-110702-7	October 18, 2022	978-1-9753-5067-3
Chapters 1–5 and some bonus short stories.
2	May 26, 2021	978-4-04-111049-2	March 21, 2023	978-1-9753-5069-7
Chapters 6–11
3	January 26, 2022	978-4-04-112014-9	July 18, 2023	978-1-9753-6293-5
Chapters 12–16
4	August 26, 2022	978-4-04-112856-5	November 21, 2023	978-1-9753-6962-0
Chapters 17–20
5	March 25, 2023	978-4-04-113509-9	April 16, 2024	978-1-9753-8057-1
Chapters 21–24
6	December 26, 2023	978-4-04-114237-0	August 20, 2024	978-1-9753-9120-1
Chapters 25–29
7	September 25, 2024	978-4-04-115270-6	December 2, 2025	979-8-8554-1927-6
Chapters 30–33
8	March 24, 2025	978-4-04-116013-8	July 28, 2026	979-8-8554-2775-2
9	August 26, 2025	978-4-04-116397-9	April 27, 2027	979-8-8554-3769-0
10	March 26, 2026	978-4-04-116992-6	—	—
11	December 24, 2026	978-4-04-117759-4	—	—
