= Right Stuf =

Asian media distributor

Right Stuf Inc.
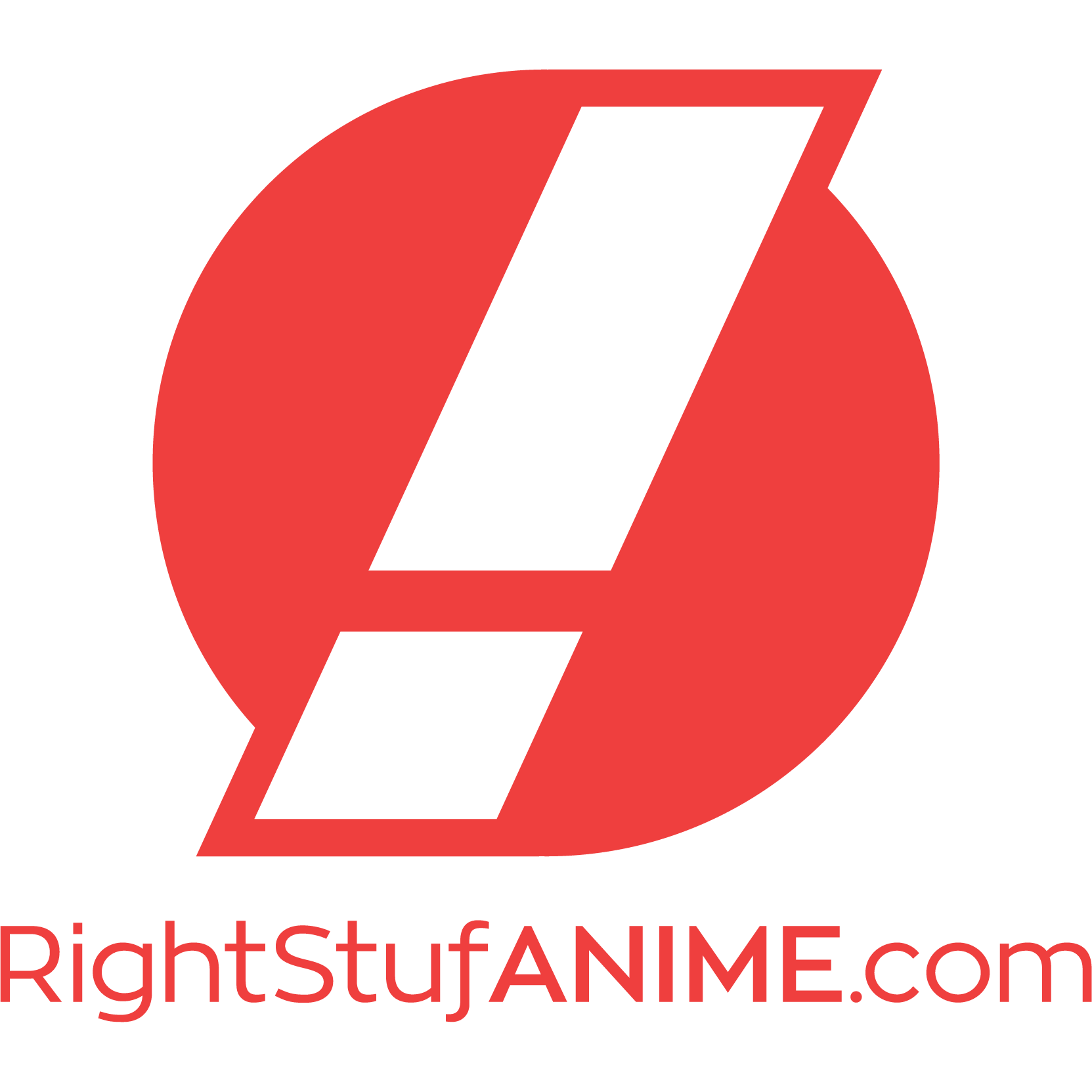
- Type: Subsidiary
- Industry: Video publisher and distributor
- Genre: Anime, Asian cinema, live action
- Founded: July 31, 1987; 39 years ago
- Founders: Shawne Kleckner; Robert "Todd" Ferson
- Defunct: October 10, 2023; 3 years ago
- Fate: Folded into the Crunchyroll Store, warehouse remains in operation
- Successor: Crunchyroll Store; Adult Source Media
- Headquarters: Grimes, Iowa, United States
- Owner: Shawne Kleckner (1987–2022); Sony (2022–2023)
- Number of employees: 70
- Parent: Crunchyroll, LLC (Note: Through a joint venture between Sony Pictures Entertainment and Aniplex.) (2022–2023)
- Divisions: Nozomi Entertainment; Critical Mass Video
- Website: legacy.rightstufanime.com

Right Stuf Inc. (formerly known as The Right Stuf International Inc.) was an American video publisher and distributor of video programming that specialized in Asian entertainment (anime and live action films). It had several divisions including: Nozomi Entertainment (production) and RightStufAnime.com (online store). In March 2012, Right Stuf launched 5 Points Pictures, its live action label. Right Stuf also offered production services and distribution for Japanese labels Sunrise Inc., Eleven Arts, Pony Canyon, and its corporate sibling, Aniplex of America.

Right Stuf was founded in July 1987, by Robert "Todd" Ferson and Shawne P. Kleckner. The company was headquartered in Grimes, Iowa. In August 2022, Right Stuf was acquired by Sony Group Corporation, and made a part of the Crunchyroll brand. As a result of the acquisition, Right Stuf ceased distribution of all hentai content on its storefronts, for which it and Crunchyroll drew criticism from fans. Crunchyroll, LLC operated the company through a joint venture run by Sony through Sony Pictures and Aniplex. Prior to the acquisition, Crunchyroll, LLC, then known as Funimation, had partnered with its subsidiary Nozomi Entertainment to stream its select titles on the FunimationNow app in 2019.

In December 2022, Kleckner announced he would be leaving the company after 35 years of being its co-founder and CEO.

In September 2023, Crunchyroll announced that Right Stuf would be merged into Crunchyroll Store in October 2023, with Crunchyroll adopting the Right Stuf pricing and shipping practices, shutting down in the process. The initial service was succeeded by Adult Source Media.

The company's warehouse located in Grimes, Iowa, remains owned by Kleckner, is currently leased to Sony until 2030 and was not fully acquired upon the acquisition of the Right Stuf brand.

== Former divisions ==
=== Nozomi Entertainment ===
Nozomi Entertainment was Right Stuf's studio focusing on "collector-grade releases for audiences of all ages." It published classic and modern anime programs for people of all ages, including Astro Boy (1963), Dirty Pair, Mobile Suit Gundam, The Irresponsible Captain Tylor, Revolutionary Girl Utena, Princess Knight, Kare Kano, Kimba the White Lion (1965), Macross, and Junjo Romantica. At the Anime Expo in 2007, CEO Shawne Kleckner announced that Right Stuf had changed the name of their production division to Nozomi Entertainment. The first title released under the new Nozomi Entertainment label was The Third. Some titles were previously licensed under the Lucky Penny Entertainment label before it was discontinued.

Despite the Right Stuf merger into Crunchyroll Store on October 10, 2023, Crunchyroll confirmed that Nozomi would continue to operate under the Crunchyroll banner, licensing its back catalog of classic anime, and the English-dubbed Blu-ray of the 1980s Dirty Pair television series that was crowdfunded on Kickstarter would be released as planned.

=== 5 Points Pictures ===
5 Points Pictures was Right Stuf's former distribution division for live action programming. In March 2012, Right Stuf, Inc. established 5 Point Pictures and announced its film distribution agreement with CJ Entertainment.

=== Critical Mass Video ===
Critical Mass Video was Right Stuf's studio for adult anime programming. It offered titles catering to an assortment of different preferences. The label was taken over by Adult Source Media after Right Stuf removed all adult content following the Crunchyroll acquisition.
