= Jitsu wa Imōto Deshita =

Japanese light novel series and its franchise

- First light novel volume cover

じつは義妹でした。 ～最近できた義理の弟の距離感がやたら近いわけ～ (Jitsu wa Imōto Deshita: Saikin Dekita Giri no Otōto no Kyorikan ga Yatara Chikai Wake)
- Genre: Romantic comedy
- Light novel
- Written by: Muku Shirai
- Illustrated by: Minori Chigusa
- Published by: Fujimi Shobo
- Imprint: Fujimi Fantasia Bunko
- Original run: November 20, 2021 – October 19, 2024
- Volumes: 8
- Manga
- Written by: Muku Shirai
- Illustrated by: Shokichi Sakai
- Published by: Fujimi Shobo
- Imprint: Dragon Comics Age
- Magazine: Dra Dra Flat
- Original run: September 1, 2022 – present
- Volumes: 9

Jitsu wa Imōto Deshita: Saikin Dekita Giri no Otōto no Kyorikan ga Yatara Chikai Wake (じつは義妹でした。 ～最近できた義理の弟の距離感がやたら近いわけ～; lit. 'He Was Actually My Stepsister: Recently, the Sense of Distance Between Me and My New Stepbrother is Incredibly Close') is a Japanese light novel series written by Muku Shirai and illustrated by Minori Chigusa. It is based on a series of videos released on the Kanon no Renai Manga YouTube channel, with the novels being published under Fujimi Shobo's Fujimi Fantasia Bunko imprint. Eight volumes were published between November 2021 and October 2024. A manga adaptation illustrated by Shokichi Sakai began serialization on the Nico Nico Seiga and KadoComi websites under Fujimi Shobo's Dra Dra Flat label in November 2022, with the series being compiled into nine volumes as of October 2026.

== Plot ==
The series focuses on Ryōta Majima, a man who long wanted to have a younger brother. He gets his wish after his father remarries, leading to having a new younger brother, Akira Himeno. Ryōta wants to be closed to Akira, although this does not go well at first. One day, while taking a bath, he discovers that Akira is actually a woman, although this does not deter his desire to become closer to her. Meanwhile, over time, Akira develops feelings for Ryōta.

== Characters ==
Ryōta Majima (真嶋 涼太, Majima Ryōta)
Voiced by: Yoshitsugu Matsuoka (voice comic)
Akira's new stepbrother after her mother's remarriage. He has long wanted to have his own younger brother and was looking forward to life with Akira. He also wants Akira to fit in with their new family. Even after learning that Akira is actually a girl, he continues his desire to become close to her.
Akira Himeno (姫野 晶, Himeno Akira)
Voiced by: Maaya Uchida (PV, voice comic)
Ryōta's new stepsister, who has a shy and tomboyish personality. Because of her boyish appearance, Ryōta initially mistakes her for a boy. She later develops feelings for Ryōta.
Kōsei Ueda (上田 光惺, Ueda Kōsei)
Voiced by: Shun'ichi Toki (voice comic)
Ryōta's best friend who has a lazy personality. Despite this, he cares for Ryōta and helps him get closer to Hinata and Akira.
Hinata Ueda (上田 ひなた, Ueda Hinata)
Voiced by: Marika Kōno (voice comic)
Kōsei's younger sister who deeply cares about him.

== Media ==
=== YouTube series ===
Jitsu wa Imōto Deshita began as a series of voiced manga videos posted on the Kanon no Renai Manga YouTube channel. Ten of these videos are currently available as of December 2024; the first two original episodes are no longer available, but still available in English.

=== Light novel ===
A light novel series adaptation written by Muku Shirai and illustrated by Minori Chigusa began publication under Kadokawa's Fujimi Fantasia Bunko imprint in November 2021. The series ended with the release of the eighth volume in October 2024. A promotional video featuring Maaya Uchida as Akira Himeno was posted on December 10, 2021.

No.	Japanese release date	Japanese ISBN
1	November 20, 2021	978-4-0407-4293-9
2	February 19, 2022	978-4-0407-4482-7
3	June 17, 2022	978-4-0407-4581-7
4	October 20, 2022	978-4-0407-4734-7
5	April 20, 2023	978-4-0407-4883-2
6	November 17, 2023	978-4-0407-5226-6
7	April 19, 2024	978-4-0407-5414-7
8	October 19, 2024	978-4-0407-5622-6

=== Manga ===
A manga adaptation illustrated by Shokichi Sakai began serialization on KadoComi and Nico Nico Seiga services under the Dra Dra Flat label on September 1, 2022. The manga has been compiled into nine tankōbon volumes as of October 2026.

No.	Japanese release date	Japanese ISBN
1	January 7, 2023	978-4-04-074830-6
2	May 9, 2023	978-4-04-074988-4
3	January 9, 2024	978-4-04-075273-0
4	June 7, 2024	978-4-04-075478-9
5	October 9, 2024	978-4-04-075636-3
6	April 9, 2025	978-4-04-075869-5
7	October 9, 2025	978-4-04-076119-0
8	April 9, 2026	978-4-04-076346-0
9	October 9, 2026	978-4-04-076584-6

=== Other media ===
A series of voiced comics featuring Uchida, Yoshitsugu Matsuoka, Shun'ichi Toki, and Marika Kōno was posted on the official Kadokawa YouTube channel. An ASMR voice product with Uchida reprising her role as Akira was released on April 19, 2024. Art from the series was also included in a compilation of illustrator Minori Chigusa's work that was released on October 19, 2024.

== See also ==
- Convenient Semi-Friend, a manga series written and illustrated by Minori Chigusa
- Futago Matomete "Kanojo" ni Shinai?, another light novel series written by Muku Shirai and illustrated by Minori Chigusa
- Shino & Ren, a manga series by Minori Chigusa
