= The Irresponsible Captain Tylor =

Japamese light novel series and its adaptations

- Tylor (front), Yamamoto (right), Yuriko (left).

無責任艦長タイラー (Musekinin Kanchō Tairā)
- Genre: Comedy, parody, space opera
- Created by: Hitoshi Yoshioka
- Light novel

The Most Irresponsible Man in Space (Uchū Ichi no Musekinin Otoko)
- Written by: Hitoshi Yoshioka
- Illustrated by: Kazuhiko Tsuzuki; Tomohiro Hirata (last two volumes)
- Published by: Fujimi Shobo
- Imprint: Fujimi Fantasia Bunko
- Original run: January 25, 1989 – January 25, 1996
- Volumes: 9 + 6 side story volumes
- Anime television series
- Directed by: Kōichi Mashimo
- Written by: Kōichi Mashimo; Hiroyuki Kawasaki
- Music by: Kenji Kawai
- Studio: Tatsunoko Production
- Licensed by: NA: Nozomi Entertainment; UK: Anime Limited
- Original network: TXN (TSC, TV Tokyo)
- Original run: January 25, 1993 – July 19, 1993
- Episodes: 26
- Light novel

The Irresponsible Kids (Musekinin Kids)
- Written by: Hitoshi Yoshioka
- Illustrated by: Tomohiro Hirata
- Published by: Fujimi Shobo
- Imprint: Fujimi Fantasia Bunko
- Original run: December 25, 1993 – August 25, 1995
- Volumes: 5
- Original video animation
- Directed by: Kōichi Mashimo (1–2); Naoyuki Yoshinaga (3–10)
- Produced by: Koji Sawai
- Written by: Kōichi Mashimo; Hiroyuki Kawasaki
- Music by: Kenji Kawai (#1–2); Toshiyuki Watanabe (#3–10)
- Studio: Daume (#1–2); Studio Deen (#3–10)
- Licensed by: NA: Nozomi Entertainment; UK: Anime Limited
- Released: October 1, 1994 – August 1, 1996
- Episodes: 10
- Light novel

The Irresponsible Quartet (Musekinin Quartet)
- Written by: Hitoshi Yoshioka
- Illustrated by: Tomohiro Hirata
- Published by: Fujimi Shobo
- Imprint: Fujimi Fantasia Bunko
- Original run: December 25, 1995 – December 25, 1996
- Volumes: 5
- Light novel

The Irresponsible Three Kingdoms (Musekinin Sangokushi)
- Written by: Hitoshi Yoshioka
- Illustrated by: Tomohiro Hirata
- Published by: Fujimi Shobo
- Imprint: Fujimi Fantasia Bunko
- Original run: May 25, 1997 – October 25, 1998
- Volumes: 10
- Light novel

The Irresponsible Apocalypse (Musekinin Mokushiroku)
- Written by: Hitoshi Yoshioka
- Illustrated by: Yoshizaki Kannon
- Published by: Enterbrain
- Imprint: Famitsu Bunko
- Original run: September 3, 1999 – April 1, 2000
- Volumes: 5
- Manga

Love & War
- Written by: Hitoshi Yoshioka
- Illustrated by: Kotaro Mori
- Published by: Enterbrain
- Original run: November 6, 2001 – November 30, 2002
- Volumes: 3
- Light novel

The Irresponsible Three Musketeers (Musekinin Sanjūshi)
- Written by: Hitoshi Yoshioka
- Illustrated by: Yoshizaki Kannon
- Published by: Enterbrain
- Imprint: Famitsu Bunko
- Published: July 3, 2000
- Volumes: 2
- Light novel

The True Irresponsible Captain Tyler (Shin Musekinin Kanchō Taira)
- Written by: Hitoshi Yoshioka
- Illustrated by: Yoshizaki Kannon, Fujimoto Hideaki, Kotaro Mori
- Published by: Enterbrain
- Imprint: Famitsu Bunko
- Original run: November 1, 2000 – February 28, 2009
- Volumes: 6 + 3 side story volumes
- Light novel

The Irresponsible Admiral Tylor (Musekinin Teitoku Taira)
- Written by: Hitoshi Yoshioka
- Illustrated by: Yoshizaki Kannon
- Published by: Enterbrain
- Imprint: Famitsu Bunko
- Original run: September 5, 2002 – June 20, 2003
- Volumes: 4
- Light novel

Super Deluxe Edition
- Written by: Hitoshi Yoshioka
- Illustrated by: Kazuhiko Tsuzuki
- Published by: The Asahi Shimbun Publishing
- Imprint: The Asahi Bunko
- Original run: January 20, 2012 – May 18, 2012
- Volumes: 2
- Anime television series

The Irresponsible Galaxy☆Tylor
- Directed by: Hiroshi Kimura
- Written by: Kaoru Asakusa
- Music by: Kenji Katoh
- Studio: Seven
- Licensed by: Crunchyroll
- Original network: AT-X, TV Saitama, tvk, Sun TV, KBS
- Original run: July 11, 2017 – September 26, 2017
- Episodes: 12
- Light novel

The Irresponsible Galaxy☆Tylor (Musekinin Gyarakushī ☆ Taira)
- Written by: Hitoshi Yoshioka
- Illustrated by: Kita Natsuki
- Published by: Kadokawa
- Published: October 20, 2017

The Irresponsible Captain Tylor (無責任艦長タイラー, Musekinin Kanchō Tairā) is an anime series based on The Most Irresponsible Man in Space (宇宙一の無責任男, Uchū Ichi no Musekinin Otoko) light novel series by Hitoshi Yoshioka, taking the title from its first volume. It was produced by some of Japan's larger studios, including Big West, Tatsunoko Production, King Records and VAP.

Tylor consists of a 26-episodes TV series directed by Kōichi Mashimo, and a sequel OVA series of 10 episodes directed by Mashimo and Naoyuki Yoshinaga. The TV show premiered in Japan on TV Tokyo between January 25, 1993, and July 19, 1993. The OVA was a 10-part series released between October 1, 1994, and August 1, 1996. Both series were broadcast across the United States by AZN Television. Tylor is distributed across North America by The Right Stuf International.

Enterbrain published a 3-volume sequel manga miniseries in 2001 and 2002. The light novels and manga haven't been translated.

A short anime series, titled The Irresponsible Galaxy☆Tylor (無責任ギャラクシー☆タイラー, Musekinin Gyarakushī☆Tairā) and produced by Seven, aired from July 11 to September 26, 2017.

== Plot ==
In a distant, highly technological future, Tylor, the title character, is a mysterious young man without a real purpose in life, a state of mind that is very hard to determine, and a knack for accidentally getting out of near-death situations with a childishly cavalier attitude. He sometimes does not even seem to realize when he is in danger, which is actually an asset to him on many occasions.

Tylor stumbles his way into the United Planets Space Force and soon gains command of a destroyer after resolving a hostage dispute and saving a retired admiral. Despite being given a decrepit and underpowered ship (the Soyokaze), thanks to brilliant strokes of luck, Tylor manages to destroy a patrol group. This is quickly followed by a sneak attack on another patrol group, performed while Tylor was playing the role of a consummate, professional soldier. The admiralty, attempting to kill Tylor, present him with a medal modified with a device to trick the Raalgon fleet into believing the Soyokaze is an entire fleet. Tylor loses the medal in UPSF HQ, and the Raalgons destroy the admiralty's super-weapon instead.

The Soyokaze is then sent to a demotion sector, despite the fervent hopes of its crew. There, Tylor and Yamamoto encounter the ghost of the former captain, who vanishes due to depression after seeing Tylor's behavior. The Admiral of the fleet, who actually drove the prior Captain to suicide, rescinds Tylor's demotion after seeing Tylor with the former captain's pipe, thinking he is now aware of the admiral's crime. Tylor is then captured by the Raalgon fleet, who plan to execute him to boost morale. After escaping his cell, Tylor encounters the Empress of the Raalgon, Azalyn, in plain dress, and spends the day entertaining her. She stops his execution, and his jailors implant microchip in his brain to control him.

Meanwhile, the crew of the Soyokaze has been imprisoned by the brass. They manage to escape captivity and invade the Melva, the main Raalgon ship, to get Tylor back. During the fight, Tylor saves Azalyn from a bomb that her treacherous Prime Minister Wang had detonated to gain power for himself. Tylor is badly injured, and Azalyn tells the Raalgon that she is going with Tylor back to the Soyokaze in order to make sure he is all right. After the doctor saves Tylor, Azalyn returns to her people.

Tylor then rendezvouses with the main fleet, where he is branded a traitor for letting Azalyn return. He is sentenced to death by a firing squad. However, Tylor convinces the brass that he can defeat the Raalgon, and they reluctantly allow him to take complete command. After coming to a stand-off with Dom, Tylor manages to spill no blood and stop the fighting for the time being. After the death of Admiral Hanner, whom Tylor had adored and talked with, Tylor becomes sullen and announces he will leave the military. Lieutenant Yamamoto is given command of the brand new ship, the Aso. In the final episode, the former crew of the Soyokaze, who are supposed to be on the Aso, join Tylor on the Soyokaze as they fly out into space.

The two major powers in the story are the UPSF (United Planets Space Force) and the Raalgon Empire (the extraterrestrials), who resemble humans with pointy ears and unusual haircolor).

One of the largest points of dispute in the story is Tylor's competence. Several characters say of Tylor, "I can't decide if he's an idiot or a genius." The answer is a mystery left up to viewers.

== Production ==
According to The Anime Encyclopedia by Jonathan Clements and Helen McCarthy:

The character [Tylor] is a cartoon version of Hitoshi Taira, the lazy protagonist of the 1962 live-action movie Japan's Irresponsible Age who was played by comedian Hitoshi Ueki. This popular satire on Japan's salaryman culture featured a feckless individual who always managed to come out on top, advancing up promotional ladders when accidents befall his superiors or lucking into important business information simply by malingering and goofing off. The series and its theatrical spin-offs were revived in 1990, suspiciously close to the time when Hummingbirds-creator Hitoshi Yoshioka would have begun work on this anime version.

== Characters ==
The main crew of the Soyokaze. Left to right: Ensigns Emi and Yumi Hanner, Lt.(junior grade) Kojiro Sakai; Lt. K. Kim; Lt. Makoto Yamamoto; Lt. Commander Justy Ueki Tylor; Lt. Commander Yuriko Star; Lt. H. Katori; Master Sgt. M. Cryburn; First Lt. K. B. Andresen; Petty Officer Harumi; and naval surgeon H. Kitaguchi.

Captain Justy Ueki Tylor (ジャスティ・ウエキ・タイラー少佐, Jasuti Ueki Taira-shōsa) is a mysterious, irresponsible man. Tylor, age 20, joined the United Planets Space Force for what he hoped would be an easy life. Originally assigned to the Pension department, he unwittingly foiled a terrorist plot to kidnap and kill a retired UPSF admiral when he tried to deliver a late check by hand. For saving the war hero's life, Tylor was promoted to Captain and placed in command of the destroyer Soyokaze (the UPSF dumping ground for trouble makers and the unwanted). Tylor has, as his superiors have put it, 'The Devil's own luck' and usually can get out of any situation relatively unscathed, avoiding multiple assassination attempts and defeating enemy groups of vastly superior numbers. He is very laid back and does not really care for the rules, using his authority as captain to change whatever regulations seem too uptight for him. He is also easily led by his crew, who are able to convince him to allow them to wear comfortable clothes on watch, hold a swimsuit competition, and let the surgeon drink while on duty. The UPSF and the Raalgon Empire are constantly debating whether Tylor possesses the most brilliant military mind or whether he is just a lucky moron.
Voiced by: Kōji Tsujitani (Japanese); Crispin Freeman (English)

Major Yuriko Star (ユリコ・スター少佐, Yuriko Sutā-shōsa) is a very strait-laced, by-the-book officer. Yuriko joined the UPSF to give her life structure and attempts to obey the rules in almost every situation. However, she, unlike Yamamoto, has no problem telling Tylor that he has done something wrong and will even resort to slapping him when he gets too far out of line. Yuriko also tries to downplay her gender, making herself a soldier first, and then a woman. This is a sore subject for her when someone comments about Tylor's obvious attraction to her looks, pointing out that she has never used her appearance to get ahead; an equally sore point for her is her budding attraction to him. Yuriko is one of the most rational and level-headed officers on the Soyokaze. While she is senior to Yamamoto, her speciality as an intelligence officer places her outside the chain of command.
Voiced by: Yuri Amano (Japanese); Rachael Lillis (English)

Lieutenant Makoto Yamamoto (マコト・ヤマモト大尉, Makoto Yamamoto-taī) is another very strait-laced, by-the-books military man. Yamamoto is the first officer on the Soyokaze and tried mightily to interject an air of professionalism to the outfit. Constantly enraged by Tylor's lack of discipline and his loose command of the troops, Yamamoto spends much of his free time in the medic's office taking tranquilizers and making use of the neuro-cleanser. Yamamoto sees Tylor for what he is, a bumbling fool, but is torn between the unwritten soldier's code of supporting and obeying your superior officer, and telling the UPSF brass what is REALLY going on. He is always on the lookout for a chance to get some form of command, hoping to get a ship of his own one day.
Voiced by: Shō Hayami (Japanese); David Brimmer (English)

Azalyn (アザリン, Azarin) is the 16-year-old empress of the Holy Raalgon Empire. Azalyn is a child, forced into the unenviable situation of having to assume power of the empire once her parents are murdered. Prompted by her advisors, she gives the command to attack the UPSF (under the assumption that they were behind the assassination plot). Having not had a chance to be a child, Azalyn must now be strong for the entire empire, and it's a task that she is afraid of taking, but even more afraid of failing in.
Voiced by: Hiroko Kasahara (Japanese); Lisa Ortiz (English)

Captain Roux Barabbas Dom (ル・バラバ・ドム, Ru Baraba Domu) is the commander of one of the Raalgon fleets. He speaks candidly with the Empress, in stark contrast to the bowing and scraping and lying of the rest of her court. Dom gains Azalyn's trust and becomes one of her more valued advisors. Dom is also very interested in Tylor, feeling that Tylor would be not only a worthy adversary, but also a challenge for anyone to decipher and defeat. It is Dom who assigned Harumi to spy on the Soyokaze's enigmatic captain, but even with the constant data coming in from his valued spy, Dom is still unsure whether Tylor really knows what he is doing or if he is just a fool.
Voiced by: Toshihiko Seki (Japanese); Josh Mosby (English)

== Light novels ==
The Irresponsible Captain Tylor is adapted from the series of light novels The Most Irresponsible Man in Space by Hitoshi Yoshioka and published under Fujimi Shobo's Fujimi Fantasia Bunko label. When the anime adaptation began, the series consisted of three trilogies and several side stories which are partly adapted by anime. Additional novel series followed, with The True Irresponsible Captain Tylor being a reprint of the original series with three volumes of new content. No light novels in the series have been translated.

=== The Most Irresponsible Man in Space ===
- Series 1

1. The Irresponsible Captain Tylor (Musekinin Kanchou Tylor)
2. The Most Irresponsible Man in the Meiji Period (Meiji Ichidai Musekinin Otoko)
3. Wang Strikes Back! (Wang no Gyakushuu)

- Series 2

4. The Irresponsible Admiral Tylor (Musekinin Gensui Tylor)
5. Azalyn, Age 16 (Azalyn, 16-sai)
6. Tylor's Big Turnabout (Tylor no Daigyakuten)

- Series 3

7. The Irresponsible President Tylor (Musekinin Daitouryou Tylor)
8. Wind Speed: 40 Light Years! (Fuusoku Yon-Juu Kounen)
9. The Eternally Irresponsible Man (Eiennare Musekinin Otoko)

=== The Most Irresponsible Man in Space Side Stories ===
1. The Galactic Age of Irresponsiblity (Ginga Musekinin Jidai)
2. The Samurai of Space (O-zora no Samurai)
3. The Scarlet Lion (Akaki Shishi)
4. Rebellion on Ice Planet Horoshiri! (Gentou Wakusei Horoshiri no Hanran)
5. Hatori-kun Time (Hatori-kun Taimu)
6. My name is Yamamoto (Waga mei wa Yamamoto)

=== The Irresponsible Kids ===
1. The Black Sun Belle (Ankoku Taiyou Komachi)
2. The Storm of "Why?" (Why? no Arashi)
3. Burning KISARA (Moete KISARA)
4. Time Guide (Jisen Annai-jin)
5. Galactic Marriage Story (Ginga Yometori Monogatari)

=== The Irresponsible Quartet ===
1. Your Name is Machiko (Kiminonaha Machiko)
2. Angel / Disqualified (Tenshi / Shikkaku)
3. Cult Annihilation (Jakyō Senmetsu)
4. Decisive Battle! Rose Nebula (Kessen! Barairo Seiun)
5. Galactic Advocate (Ginga Sansho)

=== The Irresponsible Three Kingdoms ===
1. Plot Triangle (Bōryaku Toraianguru)
2. Cold Trigonometric Function (Tsumetai Sankakukansu)
3. Flame Tricolor (Honō no Torikorōru)
4. Miracle Trinity (Kiseki no Torinitī)
5. Three Animals Advance (San-biki Kaishingekio)
6. Three Crows Appear! (Sanbagarasu tōjō!)
7. Three Crowns (Mittsu no ōkan (Kuraun))
8. The Third Challenge! (Shiren no sanbanshōbu!)
9. Third Big Bang (Sādo Bigguban)
10. Shine! Tristar (Kagayake! Toraisutā)

=== The Irresponsible Apocalypse ===
1. Financial Lightning (Fainansu Denkōsekka)
2. To Hurt (To~uhāto)
3. Double Prince (Daburu Purinsu)
4. Don't Win (Katte wa Ikenai)
5. Beyond the Grace (Onshūnokanatani)

=== The True Irresponsible Captain Tylor ===
1. Enlistment (Nyūtai)
2. Struggle (Funtō)
3. Encounter (Kaigō)
4. Prisoner of War (Ryoshū)
5. Revival (Fukkatsu)
6. Triumph (Gaisen)
7. Sidestory Love and War Part 1 (Gaiden Ravu ando U~ō-jō)
8. Sidestory Love and War Part 2 (Gaiden Ravu ando U~ō-ka)
9. ReMix Lullaby to the Lion and the Eagle (Shishi to Washi e no Rarabai)

=== The Irresponsible Admiral Tylor ===
1. Light (Kashoku)
2. Lost (Shittsui)
3. Rebellion (Hangyaku)
4. Return (Kikan)

== Media ==
=== Anime ===
The anime adaptation began as a 26-part TV series broadcast on TV Tokyo and ran from January 25 to July 19, 1993. The series was broadcast across Latin America by the television network Magic Kids. All episodes were directed by Kōichi Mashimo, and were produced by Tatsunoko Production. The OVA was a 10-part series released between October 1, 1994, and August 1, 1996. All episodes were directed between Mashimo and Koji Sawai, and were produced by Studio Deen. The story follows the career of Justy Ueki Tylor, a young man who decided to join the United Planets Space Force believing it will lead to an easy life. He later finds himself in command of his own spaceship, the Soyokaze, where he finds himself at odds with his military enemy, the Raalgon Empire, and his own crew due to his laid-back manner.

The TV series featured an opening and closing performed by Mari Sasaki: "Just Think Of Tomorrow" and "Downtown Dance" respectively. They, along with the rest of the soundtrack for both the TV series and OVA were released by AnimeTrax on June 5, 2001.

The TV series was released in the United States by Right Stuf first on VHS between October 21, 1997, and July 21, 1998, and was later released on DVD on January 30, 2001. The OVA was released on VHS and DVD between July 31 and September 25, 2001. The series was released as a digitally remastered thinpak by Right Stuf's division Nozomi Entertainment, with the TV series released on May 26, 2009, and the OVA on August 28, 2009. The series was released on Blu-ray on October 5, 2021.

A short anime series, titled The Irresponsible Galaxy☆Tylor (無責任ギャラクシー☆タイラー, Musekinin Gyarakushī☆Tairā) and produced by Seven, aired from July 11 to September 26, 2017. It was streamed in English by Crunchyroll.

=== Soundtrack ===
The soundtrack to both the TV series and the OVA were both released on CD by ADV Films and Right Stuf on June 5, 2001.

=== Manga ===
Set years after the OVAs, the manga Love & War, with a story by Yoshioka and artwork by Kotaro Mori, was published by Enterbrain in three volumes in 2001 and 2002. In it, Tylor is now a vice admiral and captain of the battleship Omi. This time he gets with his fiancée and political officer Lt. Cmdr. Yuriko Star and his staff officer and adjutant Cmdr. Makoto Yamamoto in a time travel adventure back into the past of Raalgon during the reign of Goza XV. The manga is unfinished, but Yoshioka adapted and finished the story as the first two side-story volumes of The True Irresponsible Captain Tylor reprint series in 2003 and 2004, with Mori again providing illustrations.

== Reception ==
The reviewer at THEM Anime Reviews awarded it 5 stars out of 5, calling it "a smart spoof that stands up quite well on its own", and concluding that "With an engaging plot, wonderful characters, well-rendered world-building, and surprisingly sympathetic "bad guys", Tylor will still be as fresh years from now as it is today". The website separately reviewed the OVA, giving it 4 out of 5 stars, noting that it is comparable to the original TV series, but suffers from a lack of the conclusion. The show was reviewed for Anime News Network, where it received several positive opinions, all awarding it the rating of A, with the reviewers calling it "one of the most enjoyable series" they have seen, and "a long time fan favorite".

Piotr Konieczny writing in The Encyclopedia of Science Fiction notes that the show plays with and parodies several genre traditions. Accordin to SFE, the show invokes the "bumbling commander" archetype familiar from Japanese "irresponsible man" comedies (Tylor is explicitly named after Japanese actor Hitoshi Ueki, whose 1960s film roles lampooned the salaryman) while grafting it onto the structures of space opera, and skewing the more solemn conventions of Military SF. At the same time, the show also demonstrates an evident love for the genre's scale and tropes. The show's satirical targets include the heroic martyrdom ethos of Space Battleship Yamato , the ideological gravity of Legend of Galactic Heroes, and similar solemn treatments of galactic war. By contrast, Tylor revels in bathos: moments of high military peril collapse into slapstick, or are inverted by the hero's apparent idiocy, making it similar to works such as Martian Successor Nadesico or Western works like Spaceballs , Red Dwarf, Galaxy Quest or Lexx. The entry concludes that "Captain Tylor remains popular as a cult comedy, simultaneously lampooning and celebrating the traditions of Japanese space opera. Its enduring joke – that the fate of the galaxy may rest on an "irresponsible" fool [...] – is played both for laughs and for quiet reflection."
