= Fujimi Fantasia Bunko =

Japanese publishing imprint

Fujimi Fantasia Bunko 富士見ファンタジア文庫
- Parent company: Kadokawa Corporation
- Founded: 1988; 37 years ago
- Founder: Fujimi Shobo
- Country of origin: Japan
- Publication types: Light novels
- Official website: fantasiabunko.jp

Fujimi Fantasia Bunko (富士見ファンタジア文庫, Fujimi Fantajia Bunko) is a light novel publishing imprint affiliated with the Japanese publishing company Fujimi Shobo, a brand company of Kadokawa Corporation. It was established in 1988 and is aimed at young adult male audience. Many light novels published under this imprint are serialized in Fujimi Shobo's Dragon Magazine.

== Published titles ==
=== !–9 ===
Title	Author	Illustrator	No. of volumes
99-Banme no Kyūketsuki	Kenji Saitō	Zaza	1

=== A ===
Title	Author	Illustrator	No. of volumes
Ai to Kanashimi no Esperman	Yoshinobu Akita	Masahito Watari	1
Akuma de Fantasy!?	Okina Kamino	Hiroshi Kajiyama	1
Amagi Brilliant Park	Shoji Gatoh	Yuka Nakajima	8
Amagi Brilliant Park: Maple Summoner	Keishō Yanagawa	Yuka Nakajima	3
Angel Howling	Yoshinobu Akita	You Shiina	10
Ankoku Kishi wo Nugasanaide	Shinichi Kimura	Alpha	3
Aoi Haru no Tadashii Nihongo	Hazuki Takeoka	Miho Takeoka	2
Armored Core: Fort Tower Song	Wachi Masaki	Ebine	1
Armored Mermaid	Meguru Kazami	Masa	2
Asgard Bukō Senki	Naoki Kisugi	Kurone Mishima	3
Assassin's Pride	Kei Amagi	Ninomotonino	6

=== B ===
Title	Author	Illustrator	No. of volumes
Battle Girl High School	Yanagawa Keisho	Haruken	1
BIG-4	Kenta Dairaku	Rco Wada	5
Black Blood Brothers	Kōhei Azano	Yuuya Kusaka	17
Blue Chronicle	Atsushi Shiraboshi	Ichiyan	2
Boku no Yūsha	Aoi Sekina	Nino	8
Burgund Haneiyūtan	Ayumu Yachimata	Coffee Neko	9
Bōkensha Yōsei Gakkō D-gumi no Chōsen	Seikū Hiiragi	Izumi Sakurazawa	1
Bu ni Mi wo Sasagete Hyaku to Yonen. Elf de Yari Naosu Musha Shugyō	Kakkaku Akashi	Bun150	8

=== C ===
Title	Author	Illustrator	No. of volumes
Chaos Legion	Tow Ubukata	Satoru Yuiga	7
Chōtei Shōjo Sapphire	Tsukasa Seo	Kira Yuuki	2
Chrome Shelled Regios	Shūsuke Amagi	Miyū	25
Commentarii de Imperio Romnia	Kō Maisaka	Erect Sawaru	7
Complete Novice	Noritake Tao	Kagome	5

=== D ===
Title	Author	Illustrator	No. of volumes
Dai Densetsu no Yūsha no Densetsu	Takaya Kagami	Saori Toyota	16
Dakara Boku wa, H ga Dekinai.	Pan Tachibana	Yoshiaki Katsurai	11
Date A Live	Kōshi Tachibana	Tsunako	22
Date A Live Encore	Kōshi Tachibana	Tsunako	10
Date A Live Fragments: Date A Bullet	Yuichirō Higashide	NOCO	6
D Crackers	Kouhei Azano	Hisato Murasaki	10
Dekisokonai no Monster Trainer	Takumi Minami	Koin	7
Densetsu no Yūsha no Densetsu	Takaya Kagami	Saori Toyota	11
Drag Limit Fantasia	Shuusuke Amagi	Bantya Shibano	2
Dragon's Will	Ichirō Sakaki	Yūichirō Tanuma	1
Dragon Yome wa Kamatte Hoshii	Yōichi Hatsumi	Syroh	2
Dress no Bukishōnin to Ikusabana no Kuni	Masaki Wachi	Mineji Sakamoto	1

=== E ===
Title	Author	Illustrator	No. of volumes
Eichi Gakuen no Under Heart	Kazuya Negishi	Hisasi	2
Eiyū Toshi no Bakadomo	Asaura	Ryū Dabu	3
Excellcia to Shōkan Kishi	Amane Miyazawa	Current Storage	3

=== F ===
Title	Author	Illustrator	No. of volumes
Folses Kōkoku Senki	Ryusei Shidō	Riv	3
From AS	Yutaka Amano	Lunalia	2
Fukanzen Shinsei Kikan Ilis	Kei Sazane	Akira Kasukabe	5
Full Metal Panic!	Shoji Gatoh	Shiki Douji	23
Full Metal Panic! Another	Naoto Ōguro	Yō Taichi	12
Futago Matomete "Kanojo" ni Shinai?	Muku Shirai	Minori Chigusa	3

=== G ===
Title	Author	Illustrator	No. of volumes
Gacha ni Yudaneru Isekai Haijin Seikatsu	Yōsuke Tokino	Benio	2
Gamers!	Sekina Aoi	Saboten	11
GENEZ	Fukami Makoto	Mebae	8
Gin no Cross to Draculia	Yuu Toduki	Minato Yasaka	5
Glorious Hearts	Homura Awamichi	Jū Ayakura	2
God World	Yoru Yoshimura	Harui Hayakawa	2
Gold Rush of the Dead	Yōichi Nagana	Shishizaru	1
Goshūshō-sama Ninomiya-kun	Daisuke Suzuki	Kyōrin Takanae	17
Granblue Fantasy: Members Fate	Toshihiko Tsukiji		1
Grancrest Adept	Ryo Mizuno, Tane Kakino	Ayumu Kasuga	1
Grancrest Senki	Ryo Mizuno	Miyū	9
Grimoire wa Oshiete Kurenai	Pan Tachibana	MtU	2
Guilty Black & Red	Garu Kobayashi	Ako Arisaka	2
Gun-Ota ga Mahō Sekai ni Tensei Shitara, Gendai Heiki de Guntai Harem wo Tsukucchaimashita!?	Shisui Meikyō	Suzuri	7

=== H ===
Title	Author	Illustrator	No. of volumes
Hagure Makenshi to Kyōmei Shōjotai	Naoki Kisugi	Mmu	1
Hagure Seija no Last Shoot	Tetsu Habara	MtU	1
Hajimari no Mahōtsukai	Kanto Ishinomiya	Fal Maro	5
Hamidashi Familia Seisenki	Sennendō Taguchi	Pulp Piroshi	2
Henkyō Toshi no Ikuseisha: Hajimari no Kaminari Hime	Riku Nakano	Fukukitsune	3
Henshū-san to JK Sakka no Tadashii Tsukiaikata	Hajime Asano	6U☆	2
Hentai Senpai to Ore to Kanojo	Yu Yamada	An Inugahora	3
High School DxD	Ichiei Ishibumi	Miyama-Zero	25
Hiken no Variant	Takeru Koyama	Manyako	2
Hime Kishi Seifuku Sensou	Fukami Makoto	Sora Nakano	1
Himekishi wa Orc ni Mitsukarimashita.	Yon Kiriyama	Eight Shimotsuki	2
Hime Kitsune no Servant	Mikage Kasuga	p19	4
Hi no Kuni, Kaze no Kuni Monogatari	Tooru Shiwasu	Rui Kousaki	13
Hiota no Kanojo ga Ore no Motteru Eroge ni Kyoumi Shinshin Nanda ga......	Kei Takizawa	Mutsutake	11 + 1 side story
Hitsugi no Chaika	Ichirō Sakaki	Namaniku ATK	12
Hōrō Yūsha wa Kinka to Odoru	Yukiya Murasaki	Choco Fuji	2
HP1 kara Hajimeru Isekai Musō	Sakamoto 666	MtU	1
Hōkago Traumerei	Karuta Ichijouji	Akira Hiyoshimaru	3
Hyōketsu Kyōkai no Eden	Kei Sazane	Akira Kasukabe	13
Hyakumankai Shindemo Shōjo Shitai Kaishū-ya no Kurō wo Shiranai	Saku Wariishi	Yūpon	2

=== I ===
Title	Author	Illustrator	No. of volumes
Ichi kara Hajimeru Saikyō Yūsha Ikusei	Ryo Kotohira	Reia	3
Ichiokunen Button wo Rendashita Ore wa, Kidzuitara Saikyō ni Natteita ~Rakudai Kenshi no Gakuin Musou~	Shūichi Tsukishima	Mokyu	6
Idol Defense Force Hummingbird	Hitoshi Yoshioka	Masahide Yanagisawa	2
Ignition Blood	Aitsu	Yuran	2
Imouto Complex!	Hiroki Inaba	Ebisu Daikanyama	3
Isekai de Cheat Skill wo Te ni Shita Ore wa, Genjitsu Sekai wo mo Musou Suru ~Level Up wa Jinsei wo Kaeta~	Miku	Rein Kuwashima	10
Isekai Musō no Senjutsu Ryū Kishi	Yū Yamada	Ningen	3
Isekai no Seikishi Monogatari	Masaki Kajishima, Atsushi Wada	Katsumi Enami	1
Isekai Shuzaiki	Sennendō Taguchi	Tōzai	1
Itsuka Sekai o Sukū Tame ni: Qualidea Code	Kōshi Tachibana	Kiyotaka Haimura	2
Itsuka Tenma no Kuro Usagi	Takaya Kagami	Yuu Kamiya	13
Izayoi Sanctuary	Shōtarō Mizuki	Niritsu	1
Izure Shinwa no Ragnarok	Namekojirushi	Youta	4

=== J ===
Title	Author	Illustrator	No. of volumes
Jisaku Game Sekai de Ore ga, Shinsenryaku de Musō Suru	Yoshimura Yoru	Tetsubuta	2
Jitsu wa Imōto Deshita: Saikin de Kitagiri no Otōto no Kyorikan ga Yatara Chikaiwake	Muku Shirai	Minori Chigusa	8
Jūni Seiza no Majo	Yuu Shumon	Mai Nanaka	2

=== K ===
Title	Author	Illustrator	No. of volumes
Kagiake Kirie to Sigilmus	Asaka Ikeda	Sō Sanba	3
Kakute Horobita Gensō Rakuen	Fuminori Teshima	GAN	2
Kamigami ni Sodaterare Shimo no, Saikyō to Naru	Ryosuke Haneda	Fame	5
Kamikū no Ex Machina	Kusanagi Aki	CH@R	2
Kami-sama no Inai Nichiyōbi	Kimihito Irie	Shino	9
Kamitsuke! Anno-chan.	Garu Kobayashi	Akabane	1
Kantai Collection: Bonds of the Wings of Cranes	Hiroki Uchida	Matarō	6
Kanzetsu no Hime-ō to Shōkan Kishi	Amane Miyazawa	Current Storage	3
Kaze no Stigma	Takahiro Yamato	Hanamaru Nanto	10
Kaze no Tairiku	Sei Takekawa	Mutsumi Inomata	
Keiken Zumi na Kimi to, Keiken Zero na Ore ga, Otsukiai Suru Hanashi	Makiko Nagaoka	magako	5
Kentei no Jonan Sōseiki		Ayuya	3
Keysar;Blades	Yū Toduki	Mahaya	3
Kikan Gentei Imōto.	Makiko Nagaoka	Anmi	2
Kimama de Kawaii Byōjaku Kanojo no Kamai-kata	Kanji Takehara	MACCO	1
Kimi to Boku no Saigo no Senjō, Aruiwa Sekai ga Hajimaru Seisen	Kei Sazane	Ao Nekonabe	9
Kitaku Sensou	Arare Onibi	Chiri	2
Koko wa Isekai Konbini Demon Eleven	Kenta Dairaku	Takashi Konno	3
Konjiki no Word Master	Sui Tomoto	Shungo Sumaki	10
Konjiki no Word Master Gaiden: Unique Cheat no Isekai Tanbōki	Sui Tomoto	Shungo Sumaki	2
Kore wa Zombie Desu ka?	Shinichi Kimura	Kobuichi, Muririn	19
Kyōshirō to Towa no Sora	Sumio Uetake	Kaishaku	1
Kugadachi no Tsurugi: Katana to Saya no Monogatari	Kou Maisaka	Unaji	1
Kūsen Madōshi Kōhosei no Kyōkan	Yū Moroboshi	Mikihiro Amami	14

=== L ===
Title	Author	Illustrator	No. of volumes
Last Round Arthurs	Taro Hitsuji	Kiyotaka Haimura	5
Legend of Regios	Shūsuke Amagi	Miyu	6
Lost Universe	Hajime Kanzaka	Shoko Yoshinaka	5

=== M ===
Title	Author	Illustrator	No. of volumes
Maburaho	Toshihiko Tsukiji	Eeji Komatsu	30
Machigai Eiyū no Isekai Shōkan	Junichi Kawabata	Takuya Fujima	2
Magical Death Game	Shoji Urema	CUTEG	2
Mahō no Ko	Kimihito Irie	NOCO	1
Mahō Tsukai Tai!	Junichi Sato, Chiaki Konaka		4
Majutsu Gakuen Ryōiki no Berserker	Myōjin Katō	Lia Luna	2
Majutsushi Orphen Haguretabi	Yoshinobu Akita	Yuuya Kusaka	20
Majutsushi Orphen Mubouhen	Yoshinobu Akita	Yuuya Kusaka	13
Maō Tōbatsu shita Ato, Medachitakunai node Guild Master ni Natta	Tōwa Akatsuki	Hirofumi Naruse	1
Material Ghost	Sekina Aoii	Tinkle	6
Material Night	Shusuke Amagi	Kaya Kuramoto	5
Mawase! Valkyrie no Hilde-san	Hiromitsu Hinohara	Yamcha	3
Mokushiroku Alice	Takaya Kagami	Yuuki Katou	3
Musekinin Kids	Hitoshi Yoshioka		5

=== N ===
Title	Author	Illustrator	No. of volumes
Nekura Yūsha wa Nakama ga Hoshii	Masato Hanekawa	Rozer	2
NEET Kyūketsuki, Etō-san	Daisuke Suzuki	Yousai Kuuchuu	2
Ninja Mono	Daisuke Kawaguchi	Eiji Suganuma	1

=== O ===
Title	Author	Illustrator	No. of volumes
Ochikobore no Ryūgoroshi	Pan Tachibana	Masahiro Kure	4
Ochita Kuroi Yūsha no Densetsu	Takaya Kagami	Saori Toyota	8
Oda Nobuna no Yabō Zenkokuban	Mikage Kasuga	Miyama-Zero	18 (first 11 volumes published under SoftBank Creative's GA Bunko imprint)
Oh Dorobō!	Katsumi Misaki	Reia	2
Omamori Himari	Kougetsu Mikazuki	Milan Matra	4
Omae wo Otaku ni Shiteyaru kara, Ore wo Riajū ni Shitekure!	Rin Murakami	Anapon	14
Only Sense Online	Aloha Zachō	Yukisan	12
Onnanoko ni Yume wo Mite wa Ikemasen!	Seiji Ebisu	Kōguchi Moto	2
Onna Yūsha ga Ore no Class de Bocchi ni Natteru	Keisuke Madokura	Masaki Inuzumi	1
Orc Eiyū Monogatari Sontaku Retsuden	Rifujin na Magonote	Asanagi	2
Ore ga Suki nano wa Imōto dakedo Imōto ja nai	Seiji Ebisu	Gintarō	4
Ore no Imōto wo Sekai Ichi no Breaker ni suru Hōhō	Takanori Shindō	Ichikura	1
Ore no Lovecome Heroine wa, Pantsu ga Hakenai.	Uta Sakura	Futaba Miwa	3
Ore no Seishun wo Ikenie ni, Kanojo no Maegami wo Open	Eco Nagiki	Sushi*	2
Ore to Kanojo ga Geboku de Dorei de Shūjū Keiyaku	Namekojirushi	Youta	5
Ore to Kanojo no Moeyo Pen	Rin Murakami	Tsukako Akina	6
Otaku Circle no Hime to Koi ga Dekiru Wake ga Nai.	Uta Sakura	Sayu Ayuma	4

=== P ===
Title	Author	Illustrator	No. of volumes
Panzerjagd no Fantasia	Hiroki Uchida	Kiseki Himura	3
Patlabor	Kazunori Itǒ (1), Michiko Yokote (2–5)		5
Private Tutor to the Duke's Daughter	Riku Nakano	Cura	8

=== Q ===
Title	Author	Illustrator	No. of volumes
Quintet Phantasm	Yūichirō Higashide	Wadarco	2

=== R ===
Title	Author	Illustrator	No. of volumes
RanKoi: Konyakusha wa 16-nin!?	Kou Maisaka	Shoutarou Tokunou	5
Ranobe no Pro!	Kota Nozomi	Shirabi	2
Re: Baka wa Sekai o Sukueru ka?	Tōgi Yanagimi	Tatsuya Ikegami	5
Re;Set>Gakuen Simulation	Shinjirō Dobashi	Miho Takeoka	1
Rising x Rydeen	Youichi Hatsumi	Pulp Piroshi	9
Rock Paper Scissors	Shinichi Kimura	QP:flapper	2
Roku de Nashi Majutsu Kōshi to Akashic Records	Tarō Hitsuji	Kurone Mishima	8 + 1 side story
Rongai Engineer no Force-out	Naoki Kisugi	Hokuto Saeki	1
RPG World: Roleplay World	Yoshimura Yoru	Tenmasu	15
Rune Soldier	Ryo Mizuno		21
Ryū to Majō no Sumu Yashiki	Keisuke Madokura	Taishō Tanaka	1

=== S ===
Title	Author	Illustrator	No. of volumes
Saenai Heroine no Sodatekata	Maruto Fumiaki	Kurehito Misaki	13
Saenai Heroine no Sodatekata: Girls Side	Maruto Fumiaki	Kurehito Misaki	3
Saikin, Imōto no Yōsu ga Chotto Okaishiin Da Ga.	Kougetsu Mikazuki	Mari Matsuzawa	1
Saisei no Paradigm Shift	Kou Takeba	ntny	5
Saiyaku Sensen no Overlord	Akira Higurashi	Shirabi	3
Samayō Shinki no Duelist	Ken Suebashi	H2SO4	2
Scrapped Princess	Ichirō Sakaki	Nakayohi Mogudan	13
Secret Honey	Fukami Makoto	Shugasuku	2
Seitokai no Ichizon	Aoi Sekina	Kira Inugami	18
Sekiyu-chan (Yome)	Yū Hidaka	Ogipote	1
Senkan Gakuen no Gramritter	Fuminori Teshima	Akira Kasukabe	3
Setsuna Trip	Satsuki Yamai	Non	2
Seven Cast no Hikikomori Majutsu Ō	Katsumi Misaki	Mmu	1
Shakunetsu no Ryūkihei	Yoshiki Tanaka	Hiroyuki Kitazume	5
Shijō Saikyō no Daimaō, Murabito A ni Tensei Suru	Myōjin Katō	Sao Mizuno	7
Shinmai Renkinjutsushi no Tenpo Keiei	Mizuho Itsuki	Fuumi	5
Shinsei no Gakuen Senku	Naoki Kisugi	Kurone Mishima	2
Shinsō Toshi no Odin	Takeru Koyama	Artumph	3
Shiryōjutsu Kyōshi to Yggdrasil	Tobiyuki Oritsugi	Yappen	1
Shisen Sekai no Tsuihōsha	Ayumu Mizuno	Akira Kasukabe	2
Shūmatsu no Reacta	Junichi Kawabata	Masato Mutsumi	2
S.I.R.E.N.: Jisedai Shinseibutsu Tōgō Kenkyū Tokku	Kei Sazane	Ritsu Aozaki	5
Sky World	Tsukasa Seo	Kurihito Mutou	11
Slayers	Hajime Kanzaka	Rui Araizumi	30
Snow Mist	Tsukasa Seo	Rurō	4
Sōkai no Atmosphere	Mitsuru Kakei	refeia	3
Sōkyū no Karma	Koushi Tachibana	Haruyuki Morisawa	8
Soreyuke! Uchū Senkan Yamamoto Yōko	Takashi Shouji	Takashi Akaishizawa	12
Sōshin to Sōshin no Magius	Makoto Sanda	Makoto Soga	2
Sprite Spiegel	Tow Ubukata	Kiyotaka Haimura	4
Spy Classroom	Takemachi	Tomari	4 + 1 side stories
Strait Jacket	Ichirō Sakaki	Yō Fujishiro	11

=== T ===
Title	Author	Illustrator	No. of volumes
Taberu dake de Level Up: Damegami to Issho ni Isekai Musō	kt60	Chiri	1
Tai-Madō Gakuen 35 Shiken Shōtai	Tōki Yanagimi	Kippu	13
Tasogareiro no Uta Tsukai	Kei Sazane	Miho Takeoka	10
Tenpure Tenkai no Sei de, Ore no Rabukome ga Kichiku Nan'ido	Yū Hidaka	Hazara Hisaka	1
Tenshō Tora no Gunshi	Tomohiro Kazusa	Mitsuishi Shōna	5
Ten to Chi to Hime to	Mikage Kasuga	Ryōsuke Fukai	4
Tobenai Chō to Kara no Shachi	Fuminori Teshima	Ukai Saki	5
Tokyo Haiku no Triskelion	Kō Maisaka	Kikurage	3
Tokyo Ravens	Kōhei Azano	Sumihei	14 + 3 side stories
Toriaezu Densetsu no Yuusha no Densetsu	Takaya Kagami	Saori Toyota	11
Tsuujou Kougeki ga Zentai Kougeki de ni Kai Kougeki no Okaa-san wa Suki Desuka?	Dachima Inaka	Pochi Iida	11

=== U ===
Title	Author	Illustrator	No. of volumes
Uchū Ichi no Musekinin Otoko	Hitoshi Yoshioka		15
Uchi no Kanojo ga Chūni de Komattemasu.	Hiromitsu Hinohara	Youichi Ariko	2

=== V ===
Title	Author	Illustrator	No. of volumes
Vs Fairy Tail	Ayumu Yachimata	Reia	1
VTuber nanda ga Haishin Kiriwasuretara Densetsu ni Natteta	Nana Nanato	Siokazunoko	6

=== W ===
Title	Author	Illustrator	No. of volumes
Watashitachi to Issho nara Sekai Saikyō Ikechaimasu yo?	Harushi Fukuyama	Oryō	1
World Is Continue	Tsukasa Seo	Harui Hayakawa	2

=== Y ===
Title	Author	Illustrator	No. of volumes
Yūsha ni Narenakatta Ore wa Shibushibu Shūshoku o Ketsui Shimashita.	Jun Sakyou	Masaki Inuzumi	9
Yūsha no Party de, Boku dake Nigun!?	Hyōtan Fuse	Sakuraneko	2
Yūsha Rin no Densetsu	Ryo Kotohira	karory	4
