= Date A Live: Mayuri Judgement =

2015 Japanese animated film by Keitaro Motonaga

- Theatrical release poster
- Kanji: 劇場版 デート ア ライブ 万由里ジャッジメント
- Revised Hepburn: Gekijōban Dēto A Raibu: Mayuri Jajjimento
- Directed by: Keitaro Motonaga
- Screenplay by: Hideki Shirane
- Story by: Kōshi Tachibana
- Based on: Date A Live by Kōshi Tachibana
- Produced by: Chiaki Kurakane
- Starring: Nobunaga Shimazaki; Marina Inoue; Misuzu Togashi; Ayana Taketatsu; Iori Nomizu; Asami Sanada; Maaya Uchida; Sarah Emi Bridcutt; Minori Chihara; Sora Amamiya
- Cinematography: Toru Fukushi
- Edited by: Yoshiaki Kimura
- Music by: Go Sakabe
- Production company: Production IMS
- Distributed by: Kadokawa
- Release date: August 22, 2015
- Running time: 72 minutes
- Country: Japan
- Language: Japanese
- Box office: US$247,826

Date A Live: Mayuri Judgement (Note: Japanese: 劇場版 デート ア ライブ 万由里ジャッジメント, Hepburn: Gekijōban Dēto A Raibu: Mayuri Jajjimento; lit. 'Date A Live: The Movie – Mayuri Judgement') is a 2015 Japanese animated film based on an original story written by Kōshi Tachibana featuring the characters of his light novel series Date A Live. Produced by Production IMS and distributed by Kadokawa, the film is directed by Keitaro Motonaga from a script written by Hideki Shirane. In the film, a mysterious giant sphere appears above Tengu City while Shido Itsuka meets a mysterious girl.

An anime film for the franchise was announced in June 2014, with its title being revealed in December. The staff of the film were announced in March 2015. Sora Amamiya joined the returning cast of Date A Live anime television series to voice the new character named Mayuri in April 2015.

Date A Live: Mayuri Judgement was released in Japan on August 22, 2015, and grossed over $200,000 worldwide.

== Plot ==
Following her concert, Miku Izayoi invites Shido Itsuka, Tohka Yatogami, Kotori Itsuka, Yoshino Himekawa, and the Yamai twins Kaguya and Yuzuru at a reserved indoor pool. As the group heads home, Shido begins to see a mysterious girl who is only visible to him, but the latter quickly disappears. The next morning, Shido finds a mysterious huge sphere hovering above Tengu City, but it appears invisible to everyone and can only be detected by the Fraxinus' radar. Reine Murasame suspects the sphere is formed by the six girls' Spirit energies that they emit unconsciously due to their strong feelings for Shido. She suggests Shido date each of the six girls to relieve their emotional desire and make the sphere disappear, starting with Kaguya, Miku, Yoshino, Yuzuru, Kotori, and Tohka. The mysterious girl watches over Shido as he dates each of the girls.

On his final date with Tohka, which got interrupted by Origami Tobiichi earlier, Shido meets the mysterious girl, who introduces herself as Mayuri, and learns that she was born from the girls' Spirit powers he sealed off and is connected to the sphere called Kerubiel. As Mayuri says her farewell to Shido after completing her mission of keeping the girls' moods in check, Kerubiel transforms into its Angel form and attacks them, but they are rescued by Tohka and the arrival of other girls. It kidnaps Mayuri and continues to attack the girls in their Spirit forms. Reine realizes that Mayuri's Angel became violent due to its connection to her jealousy of the girls dating Shido. When Shido mentioned his desire to save Mayuri, the girls' Spirit powers are temporarily unsealed, aiding them in their fight against Kerubiel.

After rescuing Mayuri, Kerubiel undergoes another transformation and continues its assault. As Shido tries to protect everyone, Kurumi Tokisaki secretly saves him while the girls' Spirit powers that were gathered by Mayuri begin to resonate with Tohka, giving her a new Astral Dress. With Mayuri's help by kissing Shido, Tohka destroys Kerubiel. Mayuri begins to disappear due to the kiss sealing her intangible appearance, leaving a heartbroken Shido a necklace and lollipop similar to those he bought for Yuzuru and Kotori on their respective dates earlier. A few days later, Shido and Tohka watch the damages from the incident being repaired. The other girls join them and request more dates with Shido, but he flees them.

== Voice cast ==
- Nobunaga Shimazaki as Shido Itsuka
  - Saeko Zōgō as Shiori Itsuka: Shido's identity when cross-dressing.
- Marina Inoue as Tohka Yatogami
- Misuzu Togashi as Origami Tobiichi
- Ayana Taketatsu as Kotori Itsuka
- Iori Nomizu as Yoshino Himekawa
- Asami Sanada as Kurumi Tokisaki
- Maaya Uchida as Kaguya Yamai
- Sarah Emi Bridcutt as Yuzuru Yamai
- Minori Chihara as Miku Izayoi
- Sora Amamiya as Mayuri
- Aya Endō as Reine Murasame
- Takehito Koyasu as Kyōhei Kannazuki
- Satomi Akesaka as Hinako Shiizaki
- Go Inoue as Kyoji Kawagoe
- Gorgeous as Munechika Nakatsugawa
- Kentarō Tone as Masaomi Mikimoto
- Tomoko Usami as Kozue Minowa
- Misato as Mana Takamiya
- Kanami Satō as Mikie Okamine
- Saki Ogasawara as Mildred F. Fujimura
- Anri Katsu as Hiroto Tonomachi
- Kaori Sadohara as Tamae Okamine

== Production ==
In June 2014, the Date A Live official Twitter account announced that the light novel series by Kōshi Tachibana would be getting an anime film, with the same announcement being shown at the end of the final episode of Date A Live II (2014). The franchise's official website revealed the full title of the film in December 2014. Shido Itsuka's voice actor Nobunaga Shimazaki introduced the silhouette of the titular character, Mayuri, during the Date A Fest II event in the same month. The film would be based on an original story written by Tachibana, who also served as its supervisor. Keitaro Motonaga was revealed as the film's director at Production IMS in March 2015, along with screenwriter Hideki Shirane and character designers Satoshi Ishino and Koji Watanabe, who also served as the chief animation director. In April 2015, Mayuri was revealed to be voiced by Sora Amamiya, who would also join the Date A Live anime television series' returning cast that includes Marina Inoue as Tohka Yatogami, Misuzu Togashi as Origami Tobiichi, Ayana Taketatsu as Kotori Itsuka, Iori Nomizu as Yoshino Himekawa, Asami Sanada as Kurumi Tokisaki, Maaya Uchida as Kaguya Yamai, Sarah Emi Bridcutt as Yuzuru Yamai, and Minori Chihara as Miku Izayoi.

== Music ==
Nomizu, Togashi, Kaori Sadohara, and Misato, collectively under the vocal group Sweet Arms, were revealed as the performers of the ending theme music for Date A Live: Mayuri Judgement, titled "Invisible Date", in June 2015. The film's original soundtrack composed by Go Sakabe was released in Japan on October 14, 2015.

All music is composed by Sakabe, except where indicated.

Date A Live: Mayuri Judgement – Original Soundtrack track listing
No.	Title	Lyrics	Music	Length
1.	"Go☆Summer Girl" (performed by Minori Chihara)	Shio Watanabe		5:15
2.	"Voyager of Date"			1:31
3.	"Invisible"			0:41
4.	"Goofy Dance"			1:48
5.	"Easy Going Girl"			2:18
6.	"Milk"			1:57
7.	"Ristorante Yamazaki"			2:05
8.	"Go Summer Boy"			1:24
9.	"Rain in the Garden"			2:14
10.	"Rain in the Shrine"			1:28
11.	"On My Own"			2:21
12.	"D.A.L.Nap"			0:27
13.	"Happiness in a Day"			1:56
14.	"Portrait"			2:11
15.	"All You Can Date"			1:23
16.	"Cycling"			1:45
17.	"Mayuri"			2:29
18.	"Cherubim"			1:11
19.	"Stormy Date"			2:27
20.	"Zadkiel Intro"			0:20
21.	"Zadkiel"			2:05
22.	"Date A Live" (performed by Sweet Arms)	Shio Watanabe		4:38
23.	"Undefeatable"			2:13
24.	"Hurricane"			3:16
25.	"If We Meet Again"			1:14
26.	"Invisible Date" (performed by Sweet Arms)	Shio Watanabe		4:30
27.	"Not Forget" (performed by Misato for Date A Live: Twin Edition Rio Reincarnation game)	Shoko Omori	Yūki Matsūra	3:58
Total length:				59:05

== Marketing ==
A promotional video for the announcement of Date A Live: Mayuri Judgement was released in June 2014. A teaser visual for the film was released in March 2015. In the same month, Kadokawa promoted the film in their exhibit at AnimeJapan 2015. A teaser trailer for the film was released in April 2015. During the advance ticket sale in the same month, buyers of "Date Tickets" received the film's guide booklet that contains the film's prologue short story written by Tachibana, rough sketches of Mayuri by Date A Live light novel illustrator Tsunako, a character relationship chart, summaries of the two seasons of Date A Live anime series, a profile of Tengu City, and a "peek" at the film's storyboards. A new trailer for the film was released in July 2015. Promotional partners for the film included Circle K Sunkus, Karaoke no Tetsujin, and Bean & Pop.

== Release ==
=== Theatrical ===
Date A Live: Mayuri Judgement was released in Japan on August 22, 2015. The film was screened at Anime Festival Asia in Jakarta, Indonesia, which was held on September 25–27, 2015.

=== Home media ===
Date A Live: Mayuri Judgement was released on Blu-ray and DVD in Japan on February 26, 2016. They include a 128-page novel written by Tachibana titled Mayuri Around & Tohka Notice (万由里アラウンド / 十香ノーティス, Mayuri Araundo & Tōka Nōtisu). Mayuri Around was first given as a gift novel to the moviegoers who saw the film at its premiere. Funimation began streaming the film in the United States, Canada, the United Kingdom, Ireland, Australia, and New Zealand on September 21, 2021. Crunchyroll added the film to their catalog on February 11, 2023.

== Reception ==
Date A Live: Mayuri Judgement grossed $242,284 in Japan and $5,542 in Malaysia, for a worldwide total of $247,826. The film earned ¥29 million in its opening weekend in Japan, ranking thirteenth at the box office behind Aikatsu! Music Awards: The Show Where Everyone Gets an Award! (2015).
