= Date A Live =

Japanese light novel series and its franchise

- First volume cover (art by Tsunako), feat. Tohka Yatogami

デート・ア・ライブ (Dēto A Raibu)
- Genre: Harem; Romantic comedy; Science fantasy
- Light novel
- Written by: Kōshi Tachibana
- Illustrated by: Tsunako
- Published by: Fujimi Shobo
- English publisher: NA: Yen Press
- Imprint: Fujimi Fantasia Bunko
- Magazine: Dragon Magazine
- Original run: March 19, 2011 – March 19, 2020
- Volumes: 22
- Anime television series
- Directed by: Keitaro Motonaga (I–III); Jun Nakagawa (IV–V)
- Produced by: List: Satoshi Motonaga (I); Chiaki Kurakane (I–III); Noritomo Isogai (III); Daisuke Iwasaki (III); Seiichi Kawashima (III); Yuuji Matsukura (III); Mitsuhiro Ogata (III); Mieko Tsuruta (III); Yuuji Oosato (III); Hisanori Numano (III); Hiroyasu Taniguchi (III, V); Joutarou Ishigami (IV); Shunichi Uemaru (IV); Naruki Fukaya (IV); Li Yang (IV); Yuu Kanemaru (IV–V); Masakatsu Umeda (IV–V); Junichi Takagi (IV–V); Taiyou Matsuda (IV–V); Aya Iizuka (V)
- Written by: Hideki Shirane (I–III); Fumihiko Shimo (IV–V)
- Music by: Go Sakabe
- Studio: AIC Plus+ (I); Production IMS (II); J.C.Staff (III); Geek Toys (IV–V)
- Licensed by: Crunchyroll (Note: In North America through Crunchyroll, LLC (formerly known as Funimation).); SEA: Muse Communication (III, V)
- Original network: AT-X, Tokyo MX, GBS, TVS, SUN, TVQ, Chiba TV, BS12 TwellV, MTV
- Original run: April 6, 2013 – June 26, 2024
- Episodes: 58 + 2 OVAs
- Light novel

Date A Live Encore
- Written by: Koushi Tachibana
- Illustrated by: Tsunako
- Published by: Fujimi Shobo
- Imprint: Fujimi Fantasia Bunko
- Magazine: Dragon Magazine
- Original run: May 18, 2013 – May 20, 2022
- Volumes: 11
- Anime film

Date A Live F Last Date
- Directed by: Junji Nishimura
- Written by: Fumihiko Shimo
- Studio: Fugaku
- Released: March 26, 2027
- Media franchise
- List of Date A Live manga; Date A Live: Mayuri Judgement; Date A Live Fragment: Date A Bullet; List of Date A Live video games
- icon

Date A Live (Japanese: デート・ア・ライブ, Hepburn: Dēto A Raibu) is a Japanese light novel series written by Kōshi Tachibana and illustrated by Tsunako. Fujimi Shobo published 22 volumes from March 2011 to March 2020 under their Fujimi Fantasia Bunko imprint. The light novel is licensed for English released in North America by Yen Press.

Five manga were published by Kadokawa Shoten and Fujimi Shobo in Monthly Shōnen Ace and Monthly Dragon Age. An anime television series adaptation produced by AIC Plus+ aired between April and June 2013. A second season by Production IMS aired between April and June 2014. An original anime film, Date A Live: Mayuri Judgement, was released in August 2015. A spin-off light novel series, Date A Live Fragment: Date A Bullet, began publication in March 2017. A third season by J.C.Staff aired between January and March 2019. A fourth season by Geek Toys aired from April to June 2022. A fifth season aired from April to June 2024. A new anime film titled Date A Live F Last Date, produced by Fugaku, is set to premiere in March 2027.

== Plot ==
The series begins with a strange phenomenon called a "spatial quake" devastating the center of Eurasia, resulting in at least 150 million casualties. For the next 30 years, smaller spatial quakes plague the world on an irregular basis. In the present, Shido Itsuka, a seemingly ordinary high school student, comes across a mysterious girl at the ground zero of a spatial quake. He learns from his adoptive sister Kotori the girl is one of the "Spirits" from different dimensions who are the real cause of the spatial quakes, which occur when Spirits manifest themselves in the real world. He also learns Kotori is the commander of the airship Fraxinus, crewed by the organization Ratatoskr and its parent company Asgard Electronics.

Shido is recruited by Ratatoskr to make use of his mysterious ability to seal the Spirits' powers thus stopping them from being a threat to mankind. However, there is a catch: to seal a Spirit's power, he must make each Spirit fall in love with him and make her kiss him. Moreover, Shido and his companions face the opposition of the AST (Anti-Spirit Team), a special unit designed to suppress the threat posed by Spirits by eliminating them, which is backed by DEM (Deus Ex Machina) Industries, a conglomerate led by Sir Isaac Ray Pelham Westcott who intends to exploit the powers of the Spirits for his own agenda. As Shido successfully keeps sealing more and more Spirits, he gains allies to help him with his dates with other Spirits but also increases the competition among them for his attention and affection, much to his chagrin.

== Media ==
=== Light novels ===
Date A Live began as a light novel series written by Koushi Tachibana with illustrations by Tsunako. The first volume was published on March 19, 2011, under Fujimi Shobo's Fujimi Fantasia Bunko. Twenty-two volumes have been released in Japan. During their panel at the 2020 Crunchyroll Expo, Yen Press announced that they have licensed the light novel.

=== Manga ===
The series received a total of five manga adaptions, all of which were published by Kadokawa Shoten and Fujimi Shobo in Monthly Shōnen Ace and Monthly Dragon Age.

=== Anime ===
The anime adaptation was directed by Keitaro Motonaga and produced by AIC Plus+. The series was streamed in lower quality on Niconico, with each episode available a week before its TV premiere. The first episode was streamed on March 31 and aired on Tokyo MX on April 6, 2013. The final episode was streamed on Niconico on June 16 and aired on Tokyo MX on June 22. The opening theme is titled "Date A Live" (デート・ア・ライブ, Dēto A Raibu) sung by sweet ARMS, a vocal group consisting of Iori Nomizu, Misuzu Togashi, Kaori Sadohara, and Misato. The series makes use of four ending themes: "Hatsukoi Winding Road", by Kayoko Tsumita, Risako Murai and Midori Tsukimiya; "Save The World", "Save My Heart" and "Strawberry Rain" (ストロベリーレイン), all three by Nomizu.

Following the TV broadcast of the final episode of the first season, a second season was announced, which was set to air in April 2014. The opening theme is sung by sweet ARMS titled "Trust in You" and the ending theme is sung by Kaori Sadohara titled "Day to Story". The animation production was held by Production IMS. An unaired episode was bundled with the third volume of the Date A Live Encore short story collection was released on December 9, 2014.

The first and second season have been licensed by Funimation for streaming and home video release in North America and by Madman Entertainment in Australia.

On his Twitter account, Tachibana announced Date A Live would get a third new anime series. Animation production was held by J.C.Staff, with the cast and staff reprising their respective roles from the previous seasons. The series aired from January 11 to March 29, 2019. The opening theme is sung by sweet ARMS titled "I Swear", and the ending theme is sung by Erii Yamazaki titled "Last Promise". The third season ran for 12 episodes. Crunchyroll simulcast the third season, while Funimation produced a simuldub. In Australia and New Zealand, AnimeLab simulcast the third season.

On September 17, 2019, a new anime project was announced. It was later announced to be an anime adaptation of the Date A Live Fragment: Date A Bullet spin-off novels.

On March 16, 2020, it was announced that the series would get a fourth season. The season is produced by Geek Toys and was scheduled to premiere in October 2021, but was delayed to 2022 for "various reasons". Jun Nakagawa directed the fourth season, with Fumihiko Shimo writing the series' scripts, Naoto Nakamura designing the characters, and Go Sakabe returning to compose the series' music. It aired from April 8 to June 24, 2022. The opening theme is sung by Miyu Tomita titled "OveR" and the ending theme is sung by sweet ARMS titled "S.O.S". Following Sony's acquisition of Crunchyroll, the series was moved from Funimation to Crunchyroll. On April 21, 2022, Crunchyroll announced that the season would receive an English dub, which premiered the following day.

After the conclusion of the fourth season, a fifth season was announced. The main cast and staff of the fourth season returned. It aired from April 10 to June 26, 2024. The opening theme is sung by Miyu Tomita titled "Paradoxes" and the ending theme is sung by sweet ARMS titled "Hitohira". Crunchyroll also licensed the season.

=== Theatrical films ===
An animated theatrical film was announced via the official Twitter account of the television series as the airing of the second television season concluded. On the event of "Date A Live II", the staff unveiled the film's title and the premiere date of August 22, 2015, with an original story supervised by the original light novel author, Koushi Tachibana. Nobunaga Shimazaki, the voice actor of Shido Itsuka, introduced a silhouette of the new title character, named Mayuri (万由里, Mayuri). During the events of "Tohka's Birthday" on 10 April, Sora Amamiya was confirmed to be voicing Mayuri.

A new anime project was announced on April 10, 2025. On April 10, 2026, it was announced that the project is titled Date A Live F: Last Date and will be directed by Junji Nishimura at Fugaku. On October 25, 2026, during the "Fantasia Bunko Grand Thanksgiving Festival 2026 Online" event, it was revealed to be a theatrical film, with the cast and staff reprising their roles, and it is set to premiere on March 26, 2027.

=== Video games ===
A video game named Date A Live: Rinne Utopia (デート・ア・ライブ 凜祢ユートピア, Dēto A Raibu Rinne Yūtopia) produced by Compile Heart and Sting Entertainment released on June 27, 2013, for the PlayStation 3. A promotional video was shown at Anime Contents Expo 2013. The game features a new original character named Rinne Sonogami (園神 凜祢, Sonogami Rinne), voiced by Kana Hanazawa. A PlayStation Vita version of the game was released in on July 30, 2015, and features new characters and scenarios.

Another video game, titled Date A Live: Arusu Install (或守インストール), was released on June 26, 2014, for the PlayStation 3, featuring another new character named Maria Arusu (或守 鞠亜, Arusu Maria), voiced by Suzuko Mimori. A new installment for both past games, named Date A Live Twin Edition: Rio Reincarnation (デート・ア・ライブ Twin Edition 凜緒リンカーネイション, Dēto A Raibu Tsuin Edishon Rio Rinkāneishon) produced by Compile Heart and Sting Entertainment was released on July 30, 2015, for the PlayStation Vita. It is a de facto sequel with new characters and new scenarios. The game features the Yamai Sisters, Miku Izayoi, Rinne Sonogami, Maria Arusu, as well as Marina Arusu, and a new original character named Rio (凜緒, Rio), voiced by Ayane Sakura. A promotional video was shown at the events of Date A Fes II. An English version of Date A Live: Rio Reincarnation has been released on PlayStation 4 and Steam platforms on July 23, 2019. Two CGs were modified in the English PlayStation 4 version of the game.

A fourth video game produced again by Compile Heart, titled Date A Live: Ren Dystopia (デート・ア・ライブ 蓮ディストピア, Dēto A Raibu: Ren Disutopia), was scheduled to be released on July 18, 2019, for the PlayStation 4, in Japan. The limited edition of the game includes a Tsunako-designed box, special books (Koushi Tachibana-written short story, etc.), and a drama CD. Due to various reasons, the release date had been pushed back to September 24, 2020.

A free-to-play mobile game titled Date A Live: Spirit Pledge was released in China on September 21, 2018, for Android and iOS. A beta test of a global version started on July 26, 2020.

== Reception ==
The first volume of the first anime season placed eighth place amongst Blu-ray sales in Japan during its debut week within the Oricon charts. The PS3 game Date A Live: Rinne Utopia sold 23,340 physical retail copies within the first week of release in Japan. By June 2026, the series had sold 9 million copies.

On June 12, 2015, the Chinese Ministry of Culture listed Date A Live II among 38 anime and manga titles banned in China.

== See also ==
- King's Proposal, another light novel series written by Kōshi Tachibana and illustrated by Tsunako
