= List of Date A Live volumes =

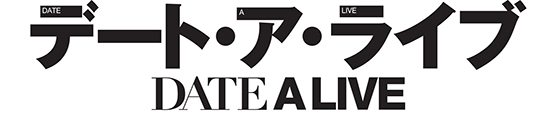
Date A Live logo

Date A Live (Japanese: デート・ア・ライブ, Hepburn: Dēto A Raibu) is a science fiction Japanese light novel series written by Kōshi Tachibana and illustrated by Tsunako. Twenty-two volumes have been published at Fujimi Shobo.

== Light novels ==
=== Main series ===
No.	Title	Original release date	English release date
1	Dead-End Tohka; Tōka Deddo Endo (十香デッドエンド)	March 19, 2011; 978-4-0407-1045-7	March 23, 2021; 978-1-9753-1991-5
Prologue: Chance Meeting: Restart; Chapter 1: A Girl with No Name; Chapter 2: The Game Begins; Chapter 3: Your Name...; Chapter 4: Surprise Date; Chapter 5: Savage Sandalphon; Epilogue: Life With a Spirit
2	Puppet Yoshino; Yoshino Papetto (四糸乃パペット)	August 20, 2011; 978-4-0407-1046-4	May 25, 2021; 978-1-9753-1993-9
Prologue: A New Day; Chapter 1: Mission: Under One Roof; Chapter 2: Rainy Girl; Chapter 3: A Twisted Show of Mercy; Chapter 4: Many Orders from the Tobiichi House; Chapter 5: Frozen Field; Epilogue: Activated Past
3	Killer Kurumi; Kurumi Kirā (狂三キラー)	November 19, 2011; 978-4-0407-1050-1	October 5, 2021; 978-1-9753-1995-3
Prologue: Visitor in Black; Chapter 1: A Second Transfer Student; Chapter 2: Ask a Spirit; Chapter 3: Sister War; Chapter 4: Triple Date; Chapter 5: Imitation Nightmare
4	Sister Itsuka; Itsuka Shisutā (五河シスター)	March 17, 2012; 978-4-0407-1047-1	January 11, 2022; 978-1-9753-1998-4
Chapter 6: Flames to Pierce Time; Chapter 7: Kotori's Conference; Chapter 8: Swimwear Battle; Chapter 9: Final Rendezvous; Chapter 10: Vengeance Five Years Coming; Epilogue: Chance Meeting at Dusk
5	Tempest Yamai; Yamai Tenpesuto (八舞テンペスト)	August 17, 2012; 978-4-0407-1048-8	April 5, 2022; 978-1-9753-2000-3
Prologue: Counterattack; Chapter 1: DEM Maneuvering; Chapter 2: Cyclone Girls; Chapter 3: Double Approach; Chapter 4: Cross-Counter Heart; Chapter 5: A Light to Rip Through the Wind; Epilogue: Shido? I Will...
6	Lily Miku; Miku Rirī (美九リリィ)	December 20, 2012; 978-4-0407-1049-5	June 28, 2022; 978-1-9753-2001-0
Prologue: Girls' Tryst; Chapter 1: Incomprehensible Spirit; Chapter 2: Male/Female; Chapter 3: Edit Time; Chapter 4: Enjoy the Sound; Chapter 5: A Blue Flash
7	Truth Miku; Miku Turūsu (美九トゥルース)	March 19, 2013; 978-4-0407-1030-3	October 18, 2022; 978-1-9753-4829-8
Chapter 6: Nightmare, Redux; Chapter 7: A Siege of Two; Chapter 8: City Sunk in Flame and Shadow; Chapter 9: Demon King; Chapter 10: Slaughter, Tyrant; Epilogue: After the Festival
8	Search Natsumi; Natsumi Sāchi (七罪サーチ)	September 20, 2013; 978-4-0407-1044-0	February 21, 2023; 978-1-9753-4994-3
Prologue: Doppelgänger; Chapter 1: Halloween; Chapter 2: Suspect; Chapter 3: Delete; Chapter 4: High Risk; Chapter 5: Witchcraft
9	Change Natsumi; Natsumi Chenji (七罪チェンジ)	December 20, 2013; 978-4-0471-2974-0	June 20, 2023; 978-1-9753-5030-7
Chapter 6: Little Monsters; Chapter 7: Headhunting; Chapter 8: Makeup; Chapter 9: I'd Like To Believe; Chapter 10: Fall Down; Epilogue: Friend or Enemy
10	Angel Tobiichi; Tobiichi Enjeru (鳶一エンジェル)	March 20, 2014; 978-4-0407-0066-3	October 17, 2023; 978-1-9753-5032-1
Prologue: Origami Tobiichi; Chapter 1: Shido in the Crosshairs; Chapter 2: Radiant Goetia; Chapter 3: Angel; Chapter 4: Deadly Truth; Chapter 5: Demon King of Descending Darkness
11	Devil Tobiichi; Tobiichi Debiru (鳶一デビル)	September 20, 2014; 978-4-0407-0143-1	February 20, 2024; 978-1-9753-5034-5
Chapter 6: Struggling; Chapter 7: Phantom; Chapter 8: Devil; Chapter 9: Instinct; Chapter 10: Angel of the Starry Sky; Epilogue: Origami Tobiichi
12	Disaster Itsuka; Itsuka Dizasutā (五河ディザスター)	June 20, 2015; 978-4-0407-0151-6	June 18, 2024; 978-1-9753-5036-9
Prologue: Beast of Demise; Chapter 1: Encroaching Abnormality; Chapter 2: The King's Procession; Chapter 3: Vacation Time; Chapter 4: Party Time; Chapter 5: Spirit Dance; Epilogue: The Second One Freed
13	Creation Nia; Nia Kurieishon (二亜クリエイション)	October 20, 2015; 978-4-0407-0694-8	November 26, 2024; 978-1-9753-7237-8
Prologue: And most importantly, there's not enough time.; Chapter 1: Remain calm. This is a Spirit's snare.; Chapter 2: Akiba, I have returned.; Chapter 3: Excellent, then 2D it is.; Chapter 4: When you give up, that's the deadline.; Chapter 5: What's yours is mine; Epilogue: You know, Nia?!
14	Planet Mukuro; Mukuro Puranetto (六喰プラネット)	March 19, 2016; 978-4-0407-0695-5	June 3, 2025; 978-1-9753-7239-2
Prologue: Awakening of a Stars; Chapter 1: Shrine Visit; Chapter 2: Space Spirit; Chapter 3: New Wings; Chapter 4: Fairy Tale; Chapter 5: Hero
15	Mukuro Family; Mukuro Famirī (六喰ファミリー)	September 17, 2016; 978-4-0407-0927-7	December 16, 2025; 978-1-9753-7241-5
Chapter 6: Battle of Cosmos; Chapter 7: The Unlocked Heart; Chapter 8: The Locked Memories; Chapter 9: Oblivion of the Outside; Chapter 10: The Key and The Sword; Epilogue: Reunion Time
16	Kurumi Refrain; Kurumi Rifurein (狂三リフレイン)	March 18, 2017; 978-4-0407-0928-4	July 14, 2026; 978-1-9753-7243-9
Prologue: Ally of Justice; Chapter 1: Nightmare's Temptation; Chapter 2: Tide of Battle; Chapter 3: A Maiden's Time; Chapter 4: The Recent Sin; Chapter 5: Samsara of Salvation
17	Kurumi Ragnarok; Kurumi Ragunaroku (狂三ラグナロク)	August 19, 2017; 978-4-0407-0929-1	December 8, 2026; 978-1-9753-7245-3
Fragment Chapter: The Birth of Spirits; Chapter 1: The Signal Outbreak of War; Chapter 2: Nightmare's Secret Maneuvers; Chapter 3: The Final Rest; Chapter 4: The Footsteps of Demise; Chapter 5: Revival of Spirit
18	Mio Game Over; Mio Gēmu Ōbā (澪ゲームオーバー)	March 20, 2018; 978-4-0407-2565-9	—
Fragment Chapter 1: Memory; Chapter 1: Mother Zero; Fragment Chapter 2: Friends; Chapter 2: The Three Wizard; Fragment Chapter 3: School; Chapter 3: The Fallen Folium of Yggdrasil; Fragment Chapter 4: Date; Chapter 4: The First and Last Confrontment; Fragment Chapter 5: Ocean; Chapter 5: The One Who Pull the Trigger
19	Mio True End; Mio Tourū Endo (澪トゥルーエンド)	August 18, 2018; 978-4-0407-2821-6	—
Chapter 1: Responsibility of the Survivors; Chapter 2: "Second" Date; Chapter 3: Battlefield That Should be Called Impossible; Chapter 4: Momentary Paradise; Chapter 5: And Her Choice Is...; Final Chapter: A Hand Stretched Out
20	Tohka World; Tohka Wārudo (十香ワールド)	March 20, 2019; 978-4-0407-2822-3	—
Prologue: Another Spirit; Fragment Chapter 1: The Other Me; Chapter 1: The World of Happiness; Fragment Chapter 2: Happiness; Chapter 2: The Stage Curtain Rises For Those Two; Fragment Chapter 3: Despair; Chapter 3: Spirit War; Fragment Chapter 4: Reunion; Chapter 4: The Last One Standing Is; Fragment Chapter 5: Dear; Chapter 5: The Benevolent God; Final Chapter: Last Day Alive
21	Tohka Good End First Half; Tōka Guddo Endo Ue (十香グッドエンド 上)	October 19, 2019; 978-4-04-073267-1	—
Chapter 0: Murasame Reine; Chapter 1: Tobiichi Origami; Chapter 2: Honjou Nia; Chapter 3: Tokisaki Kurumi; Chapter 4: Himekawa Yoshino; Chapter 5: Itsuka Kotori
22	Tohka Good End Second Half; Tōka Guddo Endo Shita (十香グッドエンド 下)	March 19, 2020; 978-4-04-073581-8	—
Chapter 6: Hoshimiya Mukuro; Chapter 7: Kyouno Natsumi; Chapter 8: Kazamachi Yamai; Chapter 9: Izayoi Miku; Chapter 10: Yatogami Tohka

=== Encore ===
Encore is a collection of short side stories taking place within the world of Date A Live.

No.	Japanese release date	Japanese ISBN
1	May 18, 2013	978-4-04-071007-5
2	May 20, 2014	978-4-04-070116-5
3	December 20, 2014	978-4-04-070149-3
4	August 20, 2015	978-4-04-070696-2
5	May 20, 2016	978-4-04-070926-0
6	December 20, 2016	978-4-04-072092-0
7	December 20, 2017	978-4-04-072564-2
8	October 20, 2018	978-4-04-072943-5
9	July 20, 2019	978-4-04-073269-5
10	August 20, 2020	978-4-04-073270-1
11	May 20, 2022	978-4-04-074603-6

== Manga ==
A manga adaption of Date A Live with illustrations by Ringo began on April 16, 2012. Due to Ringo having health problems, the manga was cancelled after six chapters. The adaptation ended covering only a part of Shido's first date with Tohka.

No.	Japanese release date	Japanese ISBN
1	August 21, 2012	978-4-04-120446-7

A spin-off manga titled Date AST Like ran from March 2012 to December 2013 in Monthly Dragon Age. A total of four tankōbon volumes were released.

No.	Japanese release date	Japanese ISBN
1	September 6, 2012	978-4-04-712826-2
2	March 7, 2013	978-4-04-712859-0
3	July 9, 2013	978-4-04-712880-4
4	March 8, 2014	978-4-04-070048-9

A third manga titled Date A Origami began serialisation in the January 2012 issue of Monthly Dragon Age, and ended in September 2013. The manga resumed serialisation following the airing of the second TV series before ultimately ended in July 2014. The content from the second serialisation was not collected into a tankōbon volume.

No.	Japanese release date	Japanese ISBN
1	March 7, 2013	978-4-04-712864-4

A fourth manga adaptation began serialisation in the January 2014 issue of Monthly Shōnen Ace, with illustrations done by Sekihiko Inui.

No.	Japanese release date	Japanese ISBN
1	March 26, 2014	978-4-04-121051-2
2	May 26, 2014	978-4-04-121113-7
3	December 26, 2014	978-4-04-102457-7

A fifth manga titled Date A Party began serialisation in the February 2014 issue of Monthly Dragon Age and was collected into one tankōbon volume.

No.	Japanese release date	Japanese ISBN
1	June 9, 2014	978-4-04-070185-1
