= Iori Nomizu =

Japanese actress (born 1985)

- 野水 伊織
- Born: October 18, 1985 (age 40); Kiryū, Gunma Prefecture, Japan
- Occupations: Actress; voice actress; singer
- Years active: 2005–present
- Height: 150 cm (4 ft 11 in)

Iori Nomizu (野水 伊織, Nomizu Iori; born October 18, 1985) is a Japanese actress, voice actress and singer who provides voices for anime television series and video games. In anime shows, she voiced Yoshino Himekawa in Date A Live, Nymph in Heaven's Lost Property, Rinko Kuzaki in Omamori Himari, Haruna in Is This a Zombie?, Mirai Andou in A Dark Rabbit Has Seven Lives, Inaho Kushiya in Maken-ki!, Fuyumi Yanagi in Blood Lad, and Funco in Upotte!!. In video games, she voices Celica A. Mercury in the BlazBlue series.

== Early acting career ==
Nomizu started her acting career portraying Moe Kagami in the Fuji TV live-action drama series Densha Otoko that was broadcast in July 2005. In June 2006, she had a role in the TBS drama series Akihabara@Deep.

She will also appear in mobile phone content such as PlayStation 2 Girls Yoshitsune Densetsu-Tsuki Beyond and Chaku Voice. She worked as a maid at the Amusement Cafe Meido in Japan, a maid cafe where an active idol opened in November works as a maid. She became a freelance in October 2007, working as a writer, providing lyrics and composition, and writing novels.

== Voice acting career ==
In 2009, she joined Production Ace as a voice actress. Her first job after her affiliation was a regular appearance on "Anison ★ Cafe Yumegaoka" broadcast on the channel Television Kanagawa.

In 2011, Nomizu performed the opening theme song "Ma ka se te Tonight" for the anime television adaptation of Is This a Zombie?. In 2012, she formed a voice actor unit sweet ARMS with Misuzu Togashi, Kaori Sadohara, and Misato who co-starred in Upotte!!.

In April 2015, she appeared in "The Queen of Hanikami Noi Izumi's Shy I'm Sorry", which became the first regular voice actor program at Anime Theater X (AT-X). The program aired until September 2015.

On February 28, 2021, she announced that she has left Production Ace.

== Filmography ==
=== Anime television ===
2000

- Daa! Daa! Daa! (Kiwi)

2009

- Heaven's Lost Property (Nymph)

2010

- Omamori Himari (Kuzaki Rinko)
- Cat Planet Cuties (Antonia)
- Heaven's Lost Property: Forte (Nymph)

2011

- Sacred Seven (Fei Zui Lau)
- Is This a Zombie? (Haruna)
- Deadman Wonderland (Minatsuki Takami)
- A Dark Rabbit Has Seven Lives (Andou Mirai)
- R-15 (Botan Beni)
- Maken-ki! (Inaho Kushiya)

2012

- Another (Yumi Ogura)
- Ebiten: Kōritsu Ebisugawa Kōkō Tenmonbu (Margaret Elizabeth)
- Is This a Zombie? of The Dead (Haruna)
- Upotte!! (FNC/Funco)
- Seitokai no Ichizon Lv.2 (Mafuyu Shiina)

2013

- Problem Children Are Coming from Another World, Aren't They? (Kuro Usagi)
- Date A Live (Yoshino Himekawa)
- A Certain Scientific Railgun S (Febrie/Janie)
- Blood Lad (Fuyumi Yanagi)

2014

- Inari, Konkon, Koi Iroha (Akemi Sumizome)
- Chaika – The Coffin Princess (Vivi Holopainen)
- Date A Live II (Yoshino Himekawa)
- Gundam Build Fighters Try (Yomi Sakashita)

2015

- Kantai Collection (Shōkaku, Zuikaku)
- The Testament of Sister New Devil (Kurumi Nonaka)
- Triage X (Haron Mikazuki)
- Sky Wizards Academy (Rico Flamel)
- Go! Princess PreCure (Yui Nanase)
- Anti-Magic Academy: The 35th Test Platoon (Lapis)
- The Testament of Sister New Devil BURST (Kurumi Nonaka)

2016

- Nameko: Sekai no Tomodachi (Space Nameko)
- First Love Monster (Yuki Fukaya)

2018

- Muhyo & Roji's Bureau of Supernatural Investigation (Nana Takenouchi)

2019

- Date A Live III (Yoshino Himekawa)
- Hensuki: Are You Willing to Fall in Love with a Pervert, as Long as She's a Cutie? (Mao Nanjō)

2020

- Muhyo & Roji's Bureau of Supernatural Investigation Season 2 (Nana Takenouchi)

2022

- Date A Live IV (Yoshino Himekawa)
- Kantai Collection: Let's Meet at Sea (Abukuma)

=== Films ===
2011

- Heaven's Lost Property the Movie: The Angeloid of Clockwork (Nymph)

2015

- Date A Live: Mayuri Judgement (Yoshino Himekawa)
- Go! Princess PreCure: The Movie (Yui Nanase)

2016

- KanColle: The Movie (Shōkaku, Zuikaku)

2017

- Pretty Cure Dream Stars (Yui Nanase)

=== TV shows ===
2009

- Anison Cafe★Yumegaoka

=== Video games ===
- BlazBlue (Celica A. Mercury)
- Sora no Otoshimono Forte: Dreamy Season (Nymph)
- Kantai Collection (6 different ships, see list)
- Extraordinary Ones (Sandy and Froggy)
- Crash Team Racing: Nitro Fueled (Coco Bandicoot)
- Girl's Frontline (MP-446, RPD, Z-62)
- Ash Arms (A6M Zero)

=== TV Drama ===
2006

- Densha Otoko Deluxe (Moe Kagami) (Meganekko / posting board member)
- Akihabara@Deep (Sūutan)

2005

- Densha Otoko (Moe Kagami) (Meganekko / posting board member)

== Discography ==
=== Mini albums ===
- [2005.12.21] Alice of... (Indies)
- [2011.10.19] Gekkou Catan (月虹カタン)

=== Studio albums ===
- [2013.08.21] – Hat Trick

=== Singles ===
- [2006.11.08] – Miracle★Drops (ミラクル★ドロップス) (Indies)
- [2011.02.09] – Ma·ka·se·te Tonight (魔・カ・セ・テ Tonight)
- [2012.04.25] – *** Passionato (*** パショナート)
- [2013.01.30] – Black † White
- [2013.05.08] – SAVE THE WORLD
- [2014.04.23] – DARAKENA
