= Castle Town Dandelion =

Japanese four-panel manga series

- Cover of the first manga volume featuring Akane Sakurada.

城下町のダンデライオン (Jōkamachi no Danderaion)
- Genre: Comedy, slice of life, supernatural
- Manga
- Written by: Ayumu Kasuga
- Published by: Houbunsha
- Magazine: Manga Time Kirara Miracle! Comic Fuz (2020 - present)
- Original run: February 16, 2012 – present
- Volumes: 8
- Anime television series
- Directed by: Noriaki Akitaya
- Written by: Reiko Yoshida
- Music by: Natsumi Tabuchi; Shū Kanematsu; Takashi Ōmama
- Studio: Production IMS
- Licensed by: AUS: Hanabee; NA: Funimation; UK: Anime Limited
- Original network: TBS, CBC, Sun TV, BS-TBS
- English network: NA: Funimation Channel
- Original run: July 2, 2015 – September 17, 2015
- Episodes: 12
- icon

Castle Town Dandelion (城下町のダンデライオン, Jōkamachi no Danderaion; "Dandelion of Jōkamachi"), is a Japanese four-panel comic strip manga series written and illustrated by Ayumu Kasuga. It made its first appearance in Houbunsha's Manga Time Kirara Miracle! magazine with the June 2012 issue. A 12-episode anime television series adaptation animated by Production IMS aired in Japan between July 2 and September 17, 2015.

== Plot ==
The Sakurada family lives in a Japanese suburban household, as their father, the king, wants his children to lead ordinary lives. Each of the nine siblings possesses a unique superpower, and more than 2,000 security cameras have been installed throughout the town to protect them. All nine siblings are candidates to succeed their father as king or queen, with the successor to be chosen through an election.

Akane Sakurada, a shy sibling who possesses the power to manipulate gravity, despises the public attention. To stop her life being continuously broadcast on television, she decides to win the election and become the ruler so she can dismantle the surveillance system.

== Characters ==
=== Sakurada family ===
Akane Sakurada (櫻田 茜, Sakurada Akane)
Voiced by: Kana Hanazawa (Japanese); Bryn Apprill (English)
The main protagonist of the series. Akane is the fourth child and third daughter of the Sakurada family. She hates being the center of attention, due to a childhood trauma and being followed by cameras all day, and as such aims to be king to get rid of the cameras, despite how ironically she would get more attention on herself if she succeeds. She adores her family & friends and likes to rely on Shū. Her ability is Gravity Core (Note: 重力制御 (グラビティコア), Gurabiti Koa; "Gravity Control"), which allows her to manipulate the gravity of herself and anyone she touches, as well as allowing her to increase her speed and strength. Despite her shyness, she has a strong sense of justice and is her class' representative. She's completely unaware that she has a fan club at school. Once, Aoi and Kanade wanted her to become a more confident person so they give her an alter-ego as a superhero named Scarlett Bloom (スカーレットブルーム, Sukāretto Burūmu), basing her on a fictional television superhero, Rose Typhoon. Akane thinks this as a great disguise not knowing that the citizens and the Sakurada siblings were all aware of her true identity and only played along with the charade for her.
Aoi Sakurada (櫻田 葵, Sakurada Aoi)
Voiced by: Ai Kayano (Japanese); Tia Ballard (English)
Eldest daughter of the Sakurada family. Her ability is originally said to be Invisible Work (Note: 完全学習 (インビジブルワーク), Inbijiburu Wāku; "Perfect Learning"), which allows her to do anything once she has learned it. However this is only a front for her true ability, Absolute Order (Note: 絶対遵守 (アブソリュートオーダー), Abusoryūto Ōdā; "Absolute Observance"), which allows her to order anyone under her bidding but she keeps this as a secret from everyone except her father, as she is afraid of this power and has very little control over it. It is also because of this that she feels she does not deserve to be queen, despite having the highest chance according to the pre-election rankings. In the manga her true ability is revealed as "Brave Believer", which is a power which gives people the push to lay their feelings bare and act on what they want to do but are hesitant to do so.
Shū Sakurada (櫻田 修, Sakurada Shū)
Voiced by: Ryōhei Kimura (Japanese); Ricco Fajardo, Terri Doty (young) (English)
Second child and eldest son of the Sakurada family. He is the twin of Kanade. His ability is Transporter (Note: 瞬間移動 (トランスポーター), Toransupōtā; "Teleportation"), which allows him to teleport him and anyone he touches to a certain location. He has stated that he is too busy making sure Kanade is not chosen as king to be campaigning for and try to become king himself, despite knowing her agenda to become one. Although not really showing it, Shū has a crush on Hana from his childhood, which makes it a reason why he prefers girls with pigtails. In the past, Shū wanted to become a professional soccer player but Kanade accidentally injured his legs which resulted in his current condition preventing him from joining advanced sports. He is the second member of the Akane Fan Club which makes it easier for him to watch out for her. He greatly adores Kanade as well. He greatly resembles his father when his father was his age.
Kanade Sakurada (櫻田 奏, Sakurada Kanade)
Voiced by: Kaori Ishihara (Japanese); Michelle Rojas (English)
Third child and second daughter of the Sakurada family. She is the twin of Shū. Her ability is Heaven's Gate (Note: 物質生成 (ヘブンズゲート), Hebunzu Gēto; "Material Creation"), which allows her to create objects using materials within a certain area. In order to materialize them, she has to pay the amount of money it takes to use the requested object, which forces her to hold down a job and keep a vast amount of money estimated to be as much as the country's national savings. She is the vice president of the Student Council. Among her siblings, Kanade has the strongest desire to become queen. Because she accidentally injured Shū's legs in the past, Kanade's motive for becoming the queen is to advance the country's medical system in order to cure him and correct her past mistake. She greatly adores Shū.
Misaki Sakurada (櫻田 岬, Sakurada Misaki)
Voiced by: Eriko Matsui (Japanese); Jad Saxton (English)
Fifth child and fourth daughter of the Sakurada family. She is the twin of Haruka. Her ability is All for One (Note: 感情分裂 (オールフォーワン), Ōru fō Wan; "Emotion Split"), which allows her to multiply herself up to seven times, which all represent aspects of her personality and the seven deadly sins: Yuniko (ユニコ) (wrath), Revi (レヴィ) (envy), Inari (イナリ) (greed), Bubu (ブブ) (gluttony), Bell (ベル) (sloth), Shaura (シャウラ) (lust), and Raio (ライオ) (pride). Since each copy excels in each of their aspects, Misaki gets annoyed that that makes her look bland in comparison as she doesn't excel in anything.
Haruka Sakurada (櫻田 遥, Sakurada Haruka)
Voiced by: Ayumu Murase (Japanese); Josh Grelle (English)
Sixth child and middle son of the Sakurada family. He is the twin of Misaki. His ability is Lots of Next (Note: 確率予知 (ロッツオブネクスト), Rottsu obu Nekusuto; "Probability Prediction"), which allows him to calculate the possibilities of a situation effortlessly. He tends to be the straight man in the antics of his siblings. Haruka is one of two Sakuraba siblings (along with Aoi) who do not take interest in the election, as he wants to support Misaki.
Hikari Sakurada (櫻田 光, Sakurada Hikari)
Voiced by: Yui Ogura (Japanese); Sarah Wiedenheft (English)
10-year-old seventh child and fifth daughter of the Sakurada family. Her ability is God Hand (Note: 生命操作 (ゴッドハンド), Goddo Hando; "Life Operation"), which allows her to increase or reverse the growth of a living being for 24 hours. Inspired by Sacchan's performance, Hikari tries to become an idol, under the name Light Sakuraba (桜庭 らいと, Sakuraba Raito), but finds it futile to draw votes for her since she isn't using her real name or age as an idol.
Teru Sakurada (櫻田 輝, Sakurada Teru)
Voiced by: Shiori Katsuta (Japanese); Jeannie Tirado (English)
Six-year-old eighth child and youngest son of the Sakurada family. His ability is Limit Over (Note: 怪力超人 (リミットオーバー), Rimitto Ōbā; "Herculean Superman"), which increases his strength to a superhuman level. He tends to speak in an old fashioned way and likes to think of himself as a hero.
Shiori Sakurada (櫻田 栞, Sakurada Shiori)
Voiced by: Aina Suzuki (Japanese); Kristin Sutton (English)
Five-year-old ninth child and youngest daughter of the Sakurada family. Her ability is Soulmate (Note: 物体会話 (ソウルメイト), Sourumeito; "Object Conversation"), which allows her to communicate with animals and even inanimate objects. Despite being the youngest of the nine, she's actually thoughtful and observant.
Borscht (ボルシチ, Borushichi)
Voiced by: Shō Hayami (Japanese); Christopher Sabat (English)
The Sakurada family's pet cat, it was first picked and adopted by Hikari. Borscht likes to chew plastic bags than cat food after claiming that even the taste of a royal cooking "loses" to a plastic bag. He also likes Akane and always sleeps on her chest as it feels like his old shelter, much to Hikari's dismay, since she thinks of herself as his true owner.
Sōichirō Sakurada (櫻田 総一郎, Sakurada Sōichirō)
Voiced by: Dai Matsumoto, Ryōhei Kimura (young) (Japanese); Phil Parsons, Ricco Fajardo (young) (English)
Sōichirō is the father of the nine Sakurada children and the king. He cares for his family so much that he secretly hires a SAT team whenever his children are alone at home. His parents died when he was younger, and as a result he became king in his first year of high school. His royal ability allows him to read people's emotions through their aura.
Satsuki Sakurada (櫻田 五月, Sakurada Satsuki)
Voiced by: Satsuki Yukino (Japanese); Stephanie Young (English)
Satsuki is the mother of the nine Sakurada children and the queen. Her original name is Satsuki Shinonome (東雲 五月, Shinonome Satsuki), and she is actually a year older than Sōichirō. She comes from a family of five siblings, and was Sōichirō's first friend as she was the only person willing to interact with him despite knowing his royalty.

=== Others ===
Hana Satō (佐藤 花, Satō Hana)
Voiced by: Yuka Aisaka (Japanese); Jill Harris (English)
Hana is Shū's classmate from elementary school who moved out from the town. After she returns, she falls in love with Shū and confesses her feelings. Though Shū has been in love with Hana since they were children, he decides to put their relationship on hold since he wants to focus on the election. Eventually, the two become lovers and Hana often helps Shū in his election campaign.
Karen Ayugase (鮎ケ瀬 花蓮, Ayugase Karen)
Voiced by: Saori Hayami (Japanese); Kristen McGuire (English)
Karen is Akane's classmate and childhood friend, always helping her whenever she is in trouble. She also has a crush on Akane.
Hajime Fukushina (福品 創, Fukushina Hajime)
Voiced by: Satoshi Nakao (Japanese); Anthony Bowling (English)
Fukushina is Akane's classmate and secretly the president of the Akane Fan Club. He likes Akane's face when she is embarrassed. Although his given name is unrevealed in the original manga, it is Hajime (創) in the anime.
An Shirogane (白銀 杏, Shirogane An)
Voiced by: Mao Ichimichi (Japanese); Brittany Lauda (English)
An is Akane's classmate. In the anime, she only made her appearance during the first and the last episodes and alongside Karen wishing their classmates to vote for Akane.
Sachiko Yonezawa (米澤 紗千子, Yonezawa Sachiko)
Voiced by: Sachika Misawa (Japanese); Alexis Tipton (English)
Nicknamed Sacchan (さっちゃん), she is an idol under the talent management Geinou Productions. Her career is the inspiration behind Hikari's alter ego as Light Sakuraba, much to her dismay. She initially sees Hikari/Light as a great rival and doesn't understand the true efforts as an idol, often giving her a bad treatment until she sprained her ankle during a live stage, causing her to realise her mistake. According to the manga's writer, Ayumu Kasuga, Sachiko was purposely designed and named after the voice actress herself.
Uzuki (卯月)
Voiced by: Kana Marutsuka (Japanese); Felecia Angelle (English)
Uzuki is one of Aoi's childhood friends, and the student council president of Sakuraka Academy.

== Media ==
=== Manga ===
Castle Town Dandelion is a four-panel comic strip manga written and illustrated by Ayumu Kasuga. It made its first appearance in the June 2012 issue of Houbunsha's Manga Time Kirara Miracle! magazine, and began serialization in the magazine with the August 2012 issue. Houbunsha published the first tankōbon volume on March 27, 2013, and eight volumes have been released as of May 27, 2025. A manga anthology illustrated by various artists titled Castle Town Dandelion Anthology Comic (城下町のダンデライオン アンソロジーコミック, Jōkamachi no Danderaion Ansorojī Komikku) was released on August 27, 2015.

=== Anime ===
The series was adapted into a 12-episode anime television series, directed by Noriaki Akitaya and animated at Production IMS. The series was written by Reiko Yoshida, and Shinpei Kobayashi served as character designer and animation director. The opening theme is "Ring Ring Rainbow!!" by YuiKaori (Yui Ogura and Kaori Ishihara), and the ending theme is "Honey♥Come!!" by Yui Ogura. The series premiered in Japan on July 2, 2015, on TBS and CBC, on Sun TV on July 3, and on BS-TBS on July 11. The series is licensed by Funimation (now known as Crunchyroll) in North America and is simulcast in its streaming service and in the United Kingdom and Ireland by Anime Limited and Viewster.

No.	Title	Original release date
1	"The Sakurada Family's Nine Siblings"; Transliteration: "Sakurada-san-chi no Kyū-nin Kyōdai" (Japanese: 櫻田さんちの9人きょうだい)	July 2, 2015
The episode opens with the family eating breakfast and heading off to school. Akane learns that the 2,000 cameras placed around town have been rearranged again, after she had just memorized their locations in an attempt to avoid them. On the way home from school, she apprehends a purse-snatcher. A few days later, the children hold a contest on live TV to show off their special abilities to the public, where they must gather the most stuffed toys off the roof of a building and collect them in baskets on the ground, with the loser having to clean all the toilets in the castle. Due to a series of embarrassing incidents, Akane is tied for last place with Hikari, who was stuck in a tree that she enlarged excessively while trying to reach the rooftop. That evening, Akane comments to Aoi that she would rather be a dandelion in the field than a princess and the center of attention. Aoi points out that if Akane were king, she could abolish the system of surveillance, and the episode ends with Akane resolving to win the election for the sake of living a quiet life.
2	"Big Sister's Good Image"; Transliteration: "Sotozura no Ii Ane" (Japanese: 外面のいい姉)	July 9, 2015
2	"Sato's Unrequited Love"; Transliteration: "Satō-san no Kataomoi" (Japanese: 佐藤さんの片想い)	July 9, 2015
Kanade and Akane leave for school to go to a student council meeting. On the way, Kanade learns of Akane's reason to become king and points out her contradiction, namely that being king would only bring her more attention. She then tries to abandon Akane for clinging to her too closely. Akane is then almost hit by a truck while saving a cat, but Kanade saves her by materializing a giant, shock-absorbent wall. Akane asks how much it cost, and is shocked when Kanade tells her it cost 40,000,000 yen. The second part of the episode focuses on Hana Satō, who is bemoaning that no one at school knows her after she transferred away for a few years. She is shocked to find that Shū still remembers her. After school, she sees him walking home with Akane, and assumes that Akane is his girlfriend, but eventually realizes the misunderstanding. Upon being confronted by Shū and Akane, she confesses her feelings for the former. He replies that while he would return her feelings, he is focused on the election and trying to prevent Kanade from becoming king, and agrees to return them once it is over. That evening, he calls her to make sure she arrived home safely. Later, Akane wonders why Shū would want to prevent Kanade from becoming king.
3	"I Want to Be Popular"; Transliteration: "Ninkimono ni Naritai no" (Japanese: 人気者になりたいの)	July 16, 2015
3	"The First Errand"; Transliteration: "Hajimete no Otsukai" (Japanese: 初めてのおつかい)	July 16, 2015
3	"Idol Activities"; Transliteration: "Aidoru Katsudō" (Japanese: アイドル活動)	July 16, 2015
Akane is chosen to grocery shopping, and Hikari volunteers to go with her. While Akane tries to evade surveillance cameras, Hikari uses her power to age into a woman in order to save a stray cat stuck on a tree. However, this results in her clothes not fitting, and she turns Akane into a child so they can switch clothes. The cat rescued by Hikari is then adopted and named Borscht by the Sakurada family. The next week in the second part, Teru volunteers himself to take over Akane's grocery shopping duties, and Shiori decides to accompany him out of worry that he will get himself into trouble. During the entire trip, Shiori repeatedly uses her power to resolve problems she and Teru come across, but Teru is unaware of this and believes he is solving their situations by himself. On their way home, they are confronted by a wild dog, but Teru saves Shiori from it. In the final part, inspired by the performance of a popular idol named Sacchan, Hikari seeks Haruka's help to become an idol to draw votes, and turns into a teenage girl to ensure she is unaccompanied to her audition. After she successfully becomes an idol, however, she realizes that her actions were futile, since she used an alias to avoid getting the job easily because of her royalty.
4	"The Royal Princess' Skirt"; Transliteration: "Ōjo no Sukāto" (Japanese: 王女のスカート)	July 23, 2015
4	"The Mysterious Student Council President"; Transliteration: "Nazo no Seito Kaichō" (Japanese: 謎の生徒会長)	July 23, 2015
In the first part, Akane arrives at school apparently not wearing a skirt. Everybody notices, but is afraid to mention it, and rumors about it spread around the school. Karen, Akane's best friend, debates whether to point it out or not, reasoning that Akane might die of embarrassment. When Akane is summoned to the student council room over the PA system, all of the boys in her class follow her with the intent of peeking at her as she goes up the stairs. On the way, they run into Kanade, who heard the rumor and is shocked to see it is true. However, Akane explains that her skirt tore on the way to school and she changed into shorts. She lifts her shirt to demonstrate, only to reveal that she is only wearing underwear after all. In the second part, Kanade announces that the school will be taking part in a town beautification project. As president of the Akane Fan Club, Fukushina attempts to restrict his and Akane's class to the school grounds to make Akane feel more comfortable. However, he loses his resolve when Kanade points out that the project would afford him a chance to see Akane with her embarrassed face. In the epilogue, at the Sakurada family residence, Borscht's affinity for Akane is revealed to be the fact that her flat chest reminds him of his old bed. When Aoi announces that they are having borscht for dinner, he flees, believing they are attempting to eat him, but returns due to the delicious smell.
5	"Summer Vacation"; Transliteration: "Natsu no Bakansu" (Japanese: 夏のバカンス)	July 30, 2015
5	"Online Secret"; Transliteration: "Kakushigoto Onrain" (Japanese: 隠し事オンライン)	July 30, 2015
5	"Eight of Misaki"; Transliteration: "Hachi-nin Misaki" (Japanese: 八人岬)	July 30, 2015
In the first arc, Shū brings his siblings on a vacation to a private beach. They play a game of smashing a watermelon, and Haruka accurately predicts the probabilities of each and every sibling's success in hitting their target, with Shiori winding up being the only one succeeding after she communicates with the watermelon and it willingly splits itself into pieces for her. After everyone has fun, they realize that Shū actually brought them to an empty lot with a painted background so it would be easier for them to be watched over and supervised. The set then breaks, exposing Akane's swimsuit in front of a large crowd of people and subsequently embarrassing her. The second arc involves Haruka trying to delete images of Akane from the family's fansites; she finds out, however, and it embarrasses her further. In the third part, Misaki uses her seven clones again in order to help multiple school clubs, but in the end feels infuriated that her clones and siblings are more popular than her. After being encouraged by Haruka and Akane, Misaki regains confidence and goes to an interview by herself.
6	"The Election and Me"; Transliteration: "Senkyo to Watashi" (Japanese: 選挙とわたし)	August 6, 2015
6	"My Big Sister is Sentimental"; Transliteration: "Onee-chan wa Senchimentaru" (Japanese: お姉ちゃんはセンチメンタル)	August 6, 2015
During the first part, the Sakurada siblings are busy with their election campaigns and the plot moves to Kanade, who reveals her reason to become the king: long ago, she brought Akane and Shū to play at a park. When she materialized a castle for Akane to play in, it crumbled and injured both Shū and Akane. Shū was the most severely injured and it broke his leg, simultaneously crushing his dream to become a soccer player. Due to this, she has since desired to become a king in order to advance the medical system and find a way to heal Shū's injury. Meanwhile, Haruka sees an improvement in his siblings, even seeing Misaki trying to campaign for herself for the first time. In the second part, after visiting a kindergarten, Kanade comes to see Aoi as a rival and sees how much Aoi doesn't want to become king. Deducing that Aoi's ability, Invisible Work, may not be her actual ability, Kanade asks her what her true power is. Aoi doesn't reveal it; she privately muses that her true power, discovered later in life, is Absolute Order, which allows her to make anyone obey her commands. As a result, she stopped using it out of fear of being unfit to be king. While returning home from school, Aoi begins to worry that she only has friends because of her royal status, but Akane reassures her.
7	"Worrywart King"; Transliteration: "Ōsama wa Shinpaishō" (Japanese: 王様は心配性)	August 13, 2015
7	"Secret Idol"; Transliteration: "Shīkuretto Aidoru" (Japanese: シークレットアイドル)	August 13, 2015
During the first part, the Sakurada family takes a vacation overseas, but Kanade and Shiori are left at the house to take care of Akane when she catches a high fever. Kanade becomes upset at her father, Sōichirō, for obsessing over her, Akane, and Shiori's safety and setting up a team of SAT officers to guard them. In the end, when Kanade attacks Shū (who was teleported from overseas to retrieve a forgotten item) after mistaking him for an intruder, SAT officers storms in, causing Kanade to be infuriated at her father. In the second part, Hikari's increasing popularity as Light Sakuraba puts Sacchan at odds with her, believing that she had not understood the true efforts of an idol. This causes her to treat her coldly and criticize her performing methods. Light learns from her manager that Sacchan worked her way into the idol business through a lot of hard effort and with no connections. During the day of a twin performance by Light and Sacchan, Sacchan accidentally sprains her ankle and Light performs the remainder of the concert alone. Witnessing Light make her performance, Sacchan realizes her mistake, apologizes to Light for the bad treatment she put her through, and asks if they could be friendly rivals, which Light accepts.
8	"Troubled Satō"; Transliteration: "Satō-san ga Nayandeiru" (Japanese: 佐藤さんが悩んでいる)	August 20, 2015
8	"The King's Side Trip"; Transliteration: "Ōsama no Yorimichi" (Japanese: 王様の寄り道)	August 20, 2015
In the first part, the Sakurada siblings all experience breakout, a period in which their powers go beyond their control. The next day, Akane takes a walk outside with Satō to talk about Shū. Her breakout abruptly takes effect, causing Akane's superhuman strength to unintentionally rip off her clothes. Satō covers her and loudly confesses her love for Shū to divert everyone's attention away from Akane. In the next part, Sōichirō tells his children the story of his days as a high school student, where his royalty status in his teenage years caused him to be feared among other students. However, he met his future wife Satsuki, a fellow schoolmate who became his first friend. She brought him to her house to have dinner with her and her siblings, thus exposing him to the warmth of a family, which he never experienced as an only child recently orphaned. He then explains that Satsuki was the one who initiated their romantic relationship and taught him how to be more sociable to other people despite being a king. Seeing this as an inspiration, Shū tries to respond to Satō's previous confession in front of her, but initially fails after accidentally bringing her to an unknown polar region, as he is still in his breakout period. She misinterprets this as his way of turning her down, but he clarifies that he returns her feelings and they start a relationship.
9	"Scarlet Bloom"; Transliteration: "Sukāretto Burūmu" (Japanese: スカーレットブルーム)	August 27, 2015
9	"Big Sister's Birthday"; Transliteration: "Onee-chan no Tanjōbi" (Japanese: お姉ちゃんの誕生日)	August 27, 2015
Wishing to find a way to help Akane overcome her shyness towards the public, Aoi and Kanade decide to create a masked superhero named Scarlet Bloom as an alter-ego for Akane and give her a pair of glasses to hide her true identity, though, in reality, everyone recognizes her for who she really is and are only playing along. However, as her election rank rises to third place as a result of her heroic deeds, she finally realizes her sisters' deception when she saves a girl from falling, as said girl recognized her as Scarlet Bloom despite her not wearing the glasses. In the second part, Misaki continues to have doubts over her abilities as king, and reveals that she only wanted to become king to impress Haruka. After receiving emotional support from Haruka, she finally starts her election and gives a self-made speech to the public on her own. Meanwhile, Aoi begins to believe that she is always a burden for everyone and that she will not be able to interact with her friends much if she became king. On Christmas Eve, her friends are forced to leave her for their own personal businesses, reinforcing her suspicions. However, after being invited to a friend's house unexpectedly, she realizes that they were actually preparing for her birthday party, wishing to celebrate with her alone before her siblings would prepare for their own.
10	"Search☆Light's Whereabouts"; Transliteration: "Sāchi Raito no Yukue" (Japanese: さーち☆らいとの行方)	September 10, 2015
10	"Big Brother Being A Big Bro"; Transliteration: "Aniki-zura Suru Onii-chan" (Japanese: 兄貴面するお兄ちゃん)	September 10, 2015
In the first part, Sacchan confides to her assistant her dislike of people of royalty, as she feels they live carefree lives and manage to accomplish their goals without any real effort. Meanwhile, Light and her manager discuss about revealing her true identity as royalty to the public help her approval ratings in the election, but Light refuses to do so, having grown to love her life as an idol and wanting to keep it separate from the election. The entire conversation is overheard by Sacchan, who is puzzled by Light's motives. During another twin performance by Light and Sacchan, Light reveals her true identity as Hikari to Sacchan, but Sacchan, having realized how serious she was taking her job, proclaims that she will only see her as Light. In the second part, Kanade continues to feel guilty over inadvertently ruining Shū's dream to become a soccer player. On the way home from a shopping trip, Kanade sees Shū and Satō, then Shū walks with Kanade along the way and she argues about her motive for winning the election and runs away. A sudden gust of wind knocks over a set of construction pipes hanging over her, but Shū is able to rescue her. Kanade admonishes him for not taking care of himself, but Shū replies that an older brother should always take care of his younger sister and then promises that he will always protect her. Kanade later decides to no longer become king for Shū's sake and instead resolves to become king for her own sake.
11	"Goodbye, Scarlet Bloom"; Transliteration: "Sayōnara Sukāretto Burūmu" (Japanese: さようならスカーレットブルーム)	September 10, 2015
With only a month left before the election takes place, the Sakurada siblings begin increasing their efforts to earn public appeal. One night, while they talk about Akane's inability to handle all the attention placed on her by other people, Kanade reveals that Akane used to be more sociable as a child. However, when she and Karen were playing at the latter's house one day, two burglars broke inside. Though Akane was initially able to fend them off using her ability, one made an attempt on her life, frightening her to the point where her power went haywire and destroyed the house. The attention she received afterwards overwhelmed her and triggered her present fear. Later, the siblings visit Sōichirō at the castle when his back gave out, and learn that he has a number of political matters to attend to. The siblings agree to take his place and split up the duties between each other. While assisting Shū and Teru under the guise of Scarlet Bloom, Akane realizes that she hadn't been wearing her glasses the entire time. Remembering how she helped Karen during the attempted burglary, Akane realizes that she doesn't need to hide her identity while helping others and throws away the glasses. At the end of the day, after viewing the latest approval polls, Teru asks Haruka if he already knows who is most likely to become king, and Haruka subtly looks at Aoi, who has been consistently in the lead in public approval.
12	"Who Will the Crown Shine Upon"; Transliteration: "Ōkan wa Dare ni Kagayaku" (Japanese: 王冠は誰に輝く)	September 17, 2015
As the Sakurada siblings begin their final pre-election speeches, Akane is noticeably more comfortable around people, even going to school on her own. Kanade discusses with the student council president about her final speech and says that she will talk about all of her siblings' fine points. Aoi is assured by her friends that they will always remain together in spite of what happens during the election. Satō becomes worried that Shū will not be able to spend more time with her if he becomes king, but Shū reassures her that he will never let her feel lonely. Misaki receives a gift made by the schoolmates she frequently assisted, who all assure that they will vote for her. Though she believes it is ultimately pointless since her older siblings are in the lead, Haruka assures her that the probabilities he calculated are not absolute. Hikari is no longer concerned about the election and focuses all of her efforts on an idol election. Teru manages to finish his final pre-election speech with Shiori's assistance, but Satsuki advises him to speak his honest emotions instead. The next day, the election begins and Aoi announces her true ability to the public, adding that she will withdraw from the election because it. Moments later, a blimp spirals out of control and threatens to crash into the castle, sparking a panic. However, the siblings all work together to safely land the blimp and restore order, with Shū televising a heartfelt speech in the process. The election proceeds and Shū wins, being crowned king. In a voice-over narration, Akane describes the lives her siblings led after the election. She then laments that while she didn't develop as much as her siblings, she is proud to have changed a little. On her way to school, Akane spots a dandelion at the side of the street and admires it.
