= Sweet Arms =

Japanese voice actor group

- Origin: Japan
- Genres: J-pop
- Years active: 2012–present
- Members: Iori Nomizu; Misuzu Togashi; Kaori Sadohara; Misato
- Website: columbia.jp/artist-info/sweetarms

Sweet Arms (stylized as sweet ARMS) is a Japanese voice actor unit that consists of four members. They are affiliated with Kami Records and Nippon Columbia.

== History ==
Sweet ARMS is a voice actor unit that was formed when Upotte!! aired. The name sweet ARMS originates from adding a mix of cuteness to "Short Arms," a rifle that is a motif in Upotte!!. Afterwards, they also sang the theme song for Date A Live. Every member was originally affiliated with Production Ace, but now, every member has moved on to different agencies.

== Members ==
Name	Date of birth	Birthplace
Iori Nomizu	October 18, 1985 (age 40)	Hokkaidō
Misuzu Togashi	August 7, 1986 (age 40)	Hokkaidō
Kaori Sadohara	January 18, 1988 (age 38)	Kanagawa Prefecture
Misato	June 14	Kanagawa Prefecture

== Discography ==
=== Singles ===
No.	Release date	Title	Identification Number		Oricon chart position
No.	Release date	Title	Limited Edition	Standard Edition	Oricon chart position
1st	July 4, 2012	I.N.G	COZC-691/2	COCC-16589	90
2nd	May 8, 2013	Date A Live (デート・ア・ライブ)	COZC-770/1	COCC-16712	11
3rd	January 29, 2014	Cherish	COZC-828/9	COCC-16831	81
4th	May 6, 2014	Trust in you	COZC-911/2	COCC-16856	17
5th	February 4, 2015	Blade of Hope	COZC-1009/10	COCC-16969	42
6th	August 19, 2015	Invisible Date	COZC-1075/6	COCC-17048	44
7th	January 30, 2019	I swear	COZC-1506/7	COCC-17556	41
8th	April 27, 2022	S.O.S.	COZC-1860/1	COCC-17954	61

=== Album ===
No.	Release date	Title	Identification Number		Oricon chart position
No.	Release date	Title	Limited edition	Standard edition	Oricon chart position
1st	July 30, 2014	TRIGGER	COZX-947/8	COCX-38651	89

=== Song collaborations ===
Song	Collaboration
ING	Anime television series Upotte!! opening
Renai Battle Line (恋愛バトルライン)	Web radio Upotte!! Radio Charge (うぽって!!ラジオ 〜とつげき! sweet ARMS〜) opening
Date A Live (デート・ア・ライブ)	Anime television series Date A Live opening
Date in Utopia (デート･イン･ユートピア)	PS3 Date A Live: Rinne Utopia (デート・ア・ライブ 凜祢ユートピア) opening
Surely Always (きっと ずっと)	PS3 Date A Live: Rinne Utopia (デート・ア・ライブ 凜祢ユートピア) ending
Cherish	Anime television series Maken-ki! opening
Trust in you	Anime television series Date A Live Season 2 opening
Installation (インストレーション)	PS3 Date A Live: Ars Install opening
Blade of Hope	Anime television series The Testament of Sister New Devil opening
Invisible Date	Anime film Date A Live: Mayuri Judgement ending
Key of Truth	PS Vita Date A Live Twin Edition: Rio Reincarnation opening
I swear	Anime television series Date A Live Season 3 opening
Temptation of Cajolery Receptor (甘言誘惑Receptor)	PS4 Date A Live: Ren Dystopia opening
S.O.S.	Anime television series Date A Live Season 4 ending
