= Inari, Konkon, Koi Iroha =

Japanese manga series

- Cover of first manga volume, featuring main heroine, Inari.

いなり、こんこん、恋いろは。
- Genre: Romantic comedy; Supernatural
- Manga
- Written by: Morohe Yoshida
- Published by: Kadokawa Shoten
- English publisher: BookWalker (digital)
- Magazine: Young Ace
- Original run: August 2010 – May 2015
- Volumes: 10
- Anime television series
- Directed by: Toru Takahashi
- Produced by: Kenjirō Gomi
- Written by: Touko Machida
- Music by: Takeshi Senoo
- Studio: Production IMS
- Licensed by: AUS: Madman Entertainment; NA: Funimation
- Original network: Tokyo MX, Sun TV, MTV, KBS, BS11, TV Saitama, tvk, CTC, TVQ, GBS
- English network: SEA: Animax Asia
- Original run: January 15, 2014 – March 19, 2014
- Episodes: 10 + OVA
- icon

Inari, Konkon, Koi Iroha (いなり、こんこん、恋いろは。; "Inari, Konkon, ABCs of Love.") , also known as InaKon (いなこん) for short, is a Japanese manga series written and illustrated by Morohe Yoshida, which were serialized in Kadokawa Shoten's Young Ace magazine from August 2010 to May 2015. An anime television adaptation by Production IMS aired in Japan between January and March 2014.

== Plot ==
Clumsy, with average intellect, and incredibly shy - these are some of the characteristics that middle schooler Inari Fushimi possesses. Despite her getting into trouble, she is always optimistic and considerate of others. When someone needs help, she really can't ignore them. She has a crush on Kouji Tanbabashi, who she always admires for being cheerful and extremely hardworking. But she couldn't bring herself to expose her feelings since her shyness kept getting in her way.

Inari, KonKon, Koi Iroha, begins with Inari taking a shortcut to school. On her way, she sees a fox pup about to fall into a river. Despite being late, she jumps into the river and saves the little fox pup from being washed away. Uka-no-Mitama-no-Kami, the goddess of the Inari Shrine is extremely thankful for Inari's kindness towards the little pup, who turns out to be a familiar named Kon. As a token of her gratitude, she fulfills one of Inari's wishes. But the fulfillment of the wish only invites trouble and Inari soon finds herself in a pinch. To compensate for her mistake, Uka-no-Mitama-no-Kami bestows a small part of her divine power to Inari, giving her the ability to transform into anyone at will.

Afterward, Inari possessing power of a god, even though it is just a small amount. Soon, various otherworldly beings start taking an interest in her, for the better or the worse. What kinds of adventure awaits Inari and will she be able to tell Koji everything that she kept locked in her heart for a very long time?

== Characters ==
=== Main characters ===
Inari Fushimi (伏見 いなり, Fushimi Inari)
Voiced by: Naomi Ōzora
Inari is the main protagonist and she is a middle school student. After saving a fox spirit from getting washed away in the river, she was granted with the power to change shape at will by uttering the phrase "Inari, Konkon", ("Konkon" seems to refer to the sound that foxes were thought to made). Later, it is hinted strongly the power she received isn't just the power to change shape; she has also unconsciously used the divine power to make her hopes come true. After a series of events, during which she returns Uka's powers but develops her own, Inari has entered new god training so she can control her divine power and live with it as a human. Outside of the gods, only Tōka and Kōji are aware of Inari's powers and her relationship with the gods. She is a kind, clumsy girl who cares deeply for her friends and wants to help anyone anyway she can. She begins to realize her powers can't always solve her problems and learns to accept herself for who she is. She confesses to Kouji and after he accepts her, the two begin to date. By the end of the manga, she is still human, a high school student and still dating Kouji, while Uka and Touka watch over her from above.
Her name is a reference to Fushimi-Inari Station. She also got ridiculed during her childhood because she had the same name as Fushimi Inari-taisha
Uka-no-Mitama-no-Kami (宇迦之御魂神)
Voiced by: Hōko Kuwashima
Usually simply called "Uka". After granting a wish by Inari to become someone else, which she came to regret, Uka gave Inari some of her power so she may transform at will. Despite being a god, she has great interest with otaku stuff and is usually seen playing games in her room or in Tōka's room. This was due to Miya introducing her to video games when she brought Uka a video game as a souvenir. She enjoys watching over humans and begins to desire wanting to be human especially because of her friendship with Inari and her feelings for Touka. She prefers spending time on earth because many Gods in the heavens only wish to marry her for her rank. She appears to have developed feelings for Tōka, much to the disdain of her fellow gods and her mother. As Inari begins to use the divine power Uka gave to her, Uka starts to disappear as Inari begins to inadvertently absorb the divine power, almost making her a God. Eventually Inari learns of this and returns the power but develops divine powers of her own, causing Inari to slowly lose her humanity as she becomes a god while Uka starts becoming human. Touka accidentally confesses to her, and she reciprocates. By the end of the manga, she is still a God and with Touka who became a God to be with her and has a child with him while watching over Inari from above.

=== Humans ===
Koji Tanbabashi (丹波橋 紅司, Tanbabashi Kōji)
Voiced by: Hiroshi Okamoto
A classmate of Inari's, whom she has a crush on, and is on the basketball team. He is a hard worker and very polite and kind. Prior to getting to know Inari, he appeared to have a crush on Sumizome, though this is soon revealed to be false. However, he soon develops feelings for Inari. He has since come to terms he likes Inari, even going so far as to tell his closest male friends of his growing feelings. He lives with his mother and his younger brother. His father died in a car accident, leaving him to decide to become independent and help his mother around the house. His feelings for Inari stem from the fact he was happy someone recognized his efforts and saw him for who he was, along with the fact despite how clumsy she is, she puts her all to helping others. He eventually comes to learn about Inari's powers. He realizes he loves her. She confesses to him and he happily accepts her. His mother eventually brings home a man she loves and plans to marry. But, Koji has a hard time coming to terms with this because he feels his mother is denying the existence of his father. Eventually, he realizes the man she chose cares for her and her children. After seeing his father's spirit, Koji comes to terms with his father's death. He is seen in high school still happily dating Inari.
His name is a reference to Tambabashi Station.
Akemi Sumizome (墨染 朱美, Sumizome Akemi)
Voiced by: Iori Nomizu
Inari's classmate, described as being extremely pretty and very popular with the boys. She loves school and homework and is usually a kind, polite person who thinks of others especially her friends. However, she has a surprisingly ferocious temper, especially when wanting to protect her friends. Her parents are often shown as busy. Her father is a transvestite, making life for her difficult as she has no one to talk to, and has to rely on herself. Originally an outcast due to her looks, Akemi has developed a close friendly bond with Inari. She develops feelings for Keiko, but chooses to cover it since she thinks people will see her weirdly as love between a girl and girl. After some encouragement from her friends, she eventually decides to accept her own feelings. While Sanjou rejects her, the two still remain friends.
Her name is a reference to Sumizome Station.
Toka Fushimi (伏見 燈日, Fushimi Tōka)
Voiced by: Yōji Ueda
Inari's older brother, who is a high school student. He appears to get relatively high grades, and begin developing feelings for Uka. He has been able to see gods since he was young. Due to an event that occurred at Uka's shrine, he was initially very mistrustful of her. Uka once transformed herself into a human to help him off the mountain. He is handsome, but a recluse and keeps to himself, frequently studying to get into a good university and he has a strange poem blog post. He is short-tempered and childish, frequently being referred to having eighth-grade syndrome, despite being in his last year of high school. He tends to get lost easily. He is protective of Inari and initially apprehensive of Uka, believing she has malicious intents for Inari, but realizes she is a good person and befriends her, even letting her come over to play games with him (though at first she came on her own accord). Eventually his grades drop over time as he spends time with Uka and wonders about his future and relationship with her. During this time, he begins to wear glasses. Despite his developing feelings for Uka, he is having doubts because he realizes he is gradually growing farther away from her. He accidentally confesses to her and becomes a God to be with Uka and has a child with her, while watching over Inari from above.
Keiko Sanjō (三条 京子, Sanjō Keiko)
Voiced by: Kumiko Ikebe
One of Inari's best friends and a tomboy who is protective of her friends. She has known Inari since elementary school and cares for her tremendously. She learns of Akemi's feelings for her after eavesdropping on her turning down another boy, and has since become conflicted on how to respond. While she does reject Akemi, she continues to be her friend.
Her name is a reference to Sanjō Station.
Chika Marutamachi (丸太町 ちか, Marutamachi Chika)
Voiced by: Kaori Sadohara
One of Inari's best friends and a fujoshi, known as Maru for short. She has trouble opening up to others due to her unique tastes, but is befriended by Inari and becomes friends with Keiko and Akemi too.
Her name is a reference to Jingū-Marutamachi Station.
Shiro Tanbabashi (丹波橋 白兎, Tanbabashi Shirou)
Voiced by: Subaru Togo
Kōji's little brother, who eventually gets to know and like Kon. He is rather sensitive, as he got mad at seeing other kids having a father. Though so, he is actually cute and appears to respect both his brother and mother.
Minami Momoyama (桃山 南, Momoyama Minami)
Voiced by: Misato
A girl who also has a crush on Kōji.
Kyōko Kangetsu (観月 今日子, Kangetsu Kyōko)
Voiced by: Maya Nishimura
Minami's best friend.

=== Gods ===
Kon (コン)
Voiced by: Sayuri Hara
Uka's familiar, who Inari saved from falling into a river. She is the smallest of the familiars, and was assigned to Inari according to her personality match. She can manifest herself to humans as a young fox-tailed girl wearing a hooded fox sweater. Kōji's younger brother, Shirō, appears to like her. In the end of the manga, she is shown to have grown up properly and could change into human's shape without fox ears and tail.
ShiShi (シシ) and RoRo (ロロ)
Voiced by: Natsuki Hanae and Satoshi Hino
Uka's familiars who are older than Kon. They often stay close by Uka, who tends to have them transform into games consoles.
Amaterasu Ōmikami (天照大御神)
Voiced by: Masako Isobe
The head goddess of the sun who watches over Inari, making sure she can control her powers. She is the God of Sun who keep the sun shone everyday on human's world. She used to complain about it, but it's later shown that she actually got some days off, like on Winter season. First appearing to be rude and to hate humans, she actually did care for humans.
Ōtoshi-no-Kami (大年神)
Voiced by: Takehito Koyasu
Known as "Toshi" for short. Uka's older brother who has an incredible sister complex, which has disturbed Uka to the point where she has banned him from entering the Inari shrine. Despite claiming to have a wife, he frequently flirts with other women openly.
Ōmiya-no-Me-no-Kami (大宮能売神)
Voiced by: Shiori Mikami
One of the five pillar gods, known as "Miya" for short. She is shown to be much younger than Uka, probably around Inari's age. She is friendly and caring.
Kamu-Ōichi-Hime (神大市比売)
Voiced by: Asami Sanada
Uka's mother.
Susanoo-no-Mikoto (須佐能乎命)
Voiced by: Takaya Kuroda
Uka's father and Amaterasu's brother, who sports a notable pompadour.

== Media ==
=== Manga ===
Inari, Konkon, Koi Iroha, written and illustrated by Morohe Yoshida, began serialization in the August 2010 issue of Kadokawa Shoten's Young Ace. The first tankōbon volume was published on March 31, 2011, and finished with ten volumes in May 2015. A spin-off four-panel comic strip manga titled Inari, Yonkoma, Koi Iroha (いなり、よんこま、恋いろは。), written by Yoshida and illustrated by Nanatsu Mukunoki, was serialized in Kadokawa Shoten's 4-Koma Nano Ace between the May and October 2013 issues.

No.	Release date	ISBN
1	March 31, 2011	978-4-04-715668-5
2	April 27, 2011	978-4-04-715696-8
3	February 2, 2012	978-4-04-120083-4
4	June 30, 2012	978-4-04-120280-7
5	November 30, 2012	978-4-04-120479-5
6	July 2, 2013	978-4-04-120695-9
7	December 28, 2013	978-4-04-120935-6
8	June 26, 2014 (w/BD edition); July 4, 2014 (regular ed.)	978-4-04-121035-2 (w/BD ed.); 978-4-04-121034-5 (regular ed.)
9	December 29, 2014	978-4-04-102454-6
10	May 2, 2015	978-4-04-103125-4

=== Anime ===
An anime television series adaptation, directed by Toru Takahashi and produced by Production IMS, aired in Japan between January 15, 2014, and March 19, 2014, and was simulcast by Funimation. An original video animation episode was released on June 26, 2014. The opening theme is "Kyō ni Koiiro" (今日に恋色, lit. 'Today's Color of Love') by May'n and the ending theme is "Saved" by Maaya Sakamoto. The anime's episode 10 features an insert song sung by Naomi Ōzora under her character name Inari Fushimi titled "Namida Harahara -Reprise-" (涙はらはら -Reprise-, lit. 'Overflowing Tears -Reprise-'). Kadokawa Entertainment also released the series on Blu-ray on March 28, 2014.

==== Episode list ====
No.	Title	Original release date
1	"Inari, First Love, First Transformation."; Transliteration: "Inari, Hatsukoi, Hatsuhenge." (Japanese: いなり、初恋、初変化。)	January 15, 2014
While taking a shortcut to school, Inari Fushimi rescues a small fox pup from falling into the river. Later, Inari ends up accidentally embarrassing her classmate Kōji Tanbabashi, whom she has a crush on. As Inari tries to find the opportunity to apologize to Kōji, she spots what she presumes is Koji giving a love letter, Akemi Sumizome, another classmate. Running off to the Inari Shrine to lament her feelings, Inari is led by some mysterious fox spirits to meet the shrine's goddess, Uka-no-Mitama-no-Kami, also known as Uka. Given an offer to have any wish granted as thanks for saving the pup from earlier, Inari makes a wish to become Akemi so she can be closer to Kōji, later discovering she is change to Akemi's appearance. Trying to get her bearings, Inari is approached by Kōji, who had heard from her friends Keiko Sanjō and Chika Muratamachi Inari is missing since she hasn't come home. After hearing Kōji blaming himself for ignoring Inari's attempts to apologize, Inari learns she shouldn't have wished to be Akemi, and she returns to Uka request her wish to undone. Unable to grant a second wish to change Inari back, Uka instead gives her a portion of her own divine power, giving Inari the ability to change into any human she wishes. After Inari manages to return to her former self, Uka assigns the fox pup from earlier, Kon, to be her familiar and keep watch over her. The next day, Inari learns Kōji is absent from school, a day before his big basketball game.
2	"Ordeals, Secrets, Amaterasu."; Transliteration: "Shiren, Himegoto, Amaterasu." (Japanese: 試練、ひめごと、天照。)	January 22, 2014
Inari uses her power to pose as one of Kōji's friends in order to check up on him, learning he had just stayed home to look after his mother and coming to understand more about him. Upon returning to the shrine, Inari and Uka are summoned to the Celestial Plains, where the gods live, to meet with the sun goddess Amaterasu. In order to determine if Inari is worthy enough to wield her divine power in the mortal world, Amaterasu tasks her with not transforming for a day. If she fails, she will be forced to undergo training in the Celestial Plains whilst Uka will be forced to marry someone. The next day, Inari encounters Akemi on her way to Kōji's game and discovers she gets along well with her. Along the way, various gods attempt to trick Inari into using her transformation. When their not-so-subtle attempts fail, they trap Inari and Akemi inside the gym storage, where Akemi collapses from heat exhaustion. Deciding to put Akemi's wellbeing before her own, Inari uses her ability to escape the gym storage and call for help. After safely seeing Akemi off, Inari works up the courage to give Kōji a good luck charm. As Inari returns to the Celestial Plains, with Uka comforting her and praising her for using her power to rescue a friend, Amaterasu announces they have both passed her test and can continue living in the mortal world. Afterwards, Inari is relieved to find Kōji was asking Akemi to be the manager for his basketball team in the letter he gave her and is thanked by him for the charm. Just as Inari reports the good news to Uka, her older brother Tōka appears, telling Uka to stay away from Inari.
3	"Elder Brother, Swarm, Excessive Love."; Transliteration: "Anija, Urusai, Kajō Ai." (Japanese: 兄じゃ、五月蠅い、過剰愛。)	January 29, 2014
Tōka was able to see spirits from a young age, where he mistook Uka for an evil spirit, Inari is approached by another divine being who takes her form, using it to cause a lot of mischief for her. He soon reveals himself to be Uka's older brother, Ohtoshi-no-Kami, a.k.a. Toshi, whose incredible sister complex frightens even Uka, who is discovered by Tōka hiding in his attic and ends up playing video games with him. Toshi takes Inari to a 'New God Welcoming Party' at the Celestial Plains, where she meets the goddess Ohmiya-no-Me-no-Kami, a.k.a. Miya, who tells her the reasons why Uka fled to the human world. However, when the other gods pressure Inari into showing off her transformation, the power ends up running amok, having an effect on Uka, until Amaterasu stops her. As Inari is advised to learn to stabilize her powers before returning them to Uka, at which point she will become unable to see her again, Uka asks Tōka not to tell Inari she collapsed. While Inari is testing out her transformation for stability, Tōka walks in on her transforming into their mother.
4	"Scarlet, Festival Eve, Romance."; Transliteration: "Hi-iro, Yomiya, Koi Moyō." (Japanese: 緋色、宵宮、恋模様。)	February 5, 2014
Suspicious about Inari allegedly having powers, Tōka spends the entire night keeping an eye on her. After Uka reassures her she'll assure Tōka nothing is happening, Inari goes to a festival with Akemi, where they are followed by Toshi. Believing him to be a stalker, Keiko appears and puts a stop to Toshi, earning admiration from Akemi who starts to look at her in a new light. As Inari gets to spend time with Kōji, Uka has an unfortunate run-in with Toshi, leading her to believe her divine power, which she was using to keep him out of the shrine, is dwindling. As Toka confronts Uka over giving Inari power. Uka claims she had only given her the power to see her, and Toshi warns her of the dangers of becoming close with humans.
5	"Jellyfish, Friends, Summer Storm."; Transliteration: "Kurage, Tomodachi, Natsu Arashi." (Japanese: 海月、友達、夏あらし。)	February 12, 2014
Going on a trip to the beach with her parents and friends, Inari notices Chika isn't too fond of Akemi, as she feels she can't get along with her since they are so different from each other. As Akemi notices the same thing, Keiko tells her about how Inari is able to become friends with anyone, which leaves Akemi a little jealous of her. Later at night, after Inari ends up arguing with Chika about Akemi, she transforms into Keiko to protect Akemi from an overenthusiastic boy, whilst Keiko herself assures Chika their friendship won't be changed by Akemi being friends with them. After Inari returns to her normal form, Akemi, believing Keiko had left her behind, vents her frustrations that she is jealous of Inari's closeness to Keiko, stating her wish to become her. This causes an influx of divine power from Inari as she considers if she should grant her wish, which also has an adverse effect on Uka.
6	"Touka, Mistress Uka, A Woman in Love."; Transliteration: "Tōka, Uka-sama, Koisuchō." (Japanese: 燈日、うか様、恋すてふ。)	February 19, 2014
Coming to understand granting Akemi's wish won't change anything, Inari manages to calm down her divine power by explaining to Akemi she once felt the same way as her, offering to help her as much as she can with her own strength. Afterwards, they return to Chika, with everyone apologizing and making up with each other. Akemi and Chika finally becoming proper friends. The next day, Akemi tells Inari and Chika she is in love with Keiko, receiving their full support. Meanwhile, Uka comes round to play with Tōka, recalling how she once helped him when he was lost in the shrine. Inari soon returns home to tell Uka about her trip, keeping quiet about the divine power incident.
7	"Maiden, Aflutter, Madder Red."; Transliteration: "Otome, Tokimeku, Akane-iro." (Japanese: おとめ、ときめく、あかね色。)	February 26, 2014
Inari manages to get a lead role alongside Kōji in a play their class is holding for the upcoming school cultural festival. Meanwhile, Uka is being pressured by her mother, Kamu-Ōichi-Hime, to attend some marriage meetings in Izumo next month. Later at night, Inari is shocked to learn from Kon she had subconsciously used her divine power to win the part in the play. Inari's feelings of guilt only worsen when she is asked by a girl named Minami Momoyama to pass on a love letter to Kōji. After Inari decides to relinquish her role in the play, feeling she didn't deserve it, she ends up accidentally using her divine power again to blow Minami's letter to Kōji away. Despite Kon's objection, Inari transforms into Minami to relay the letter's feelings directly to Kōji. Kōji rejects Minami's feelings, but comes to understand from Inari's advice he likes Inari. After the play, as Uka prepares to go to Izumo, Tōka ends up overhearing her about Inari possessing divine power just before she leaves.
8	"Izumo, Arranged Dates, Kerfuffle."; Transliteration: "Izumo, Omiai, Ōsawagi." (Japanese: 出雲、お見合い、大騒ぎ。)	March 5, 2014
Tōka takes Inari with him to Izumo to try and talk with Uka about Inari's divine power, but Kamu drags her away to her marriage meetings whilst Inari and Tōka are stuck with Toshi. Wanting to put a stop to Uka's arranged marriage, Inari takes Uka's form to take her place and try and thwart the meetings, which causes the real Uka to faint due to her divine power being drained. However, Inari's efforts only serve to infuriate Kamu, who sends the other guards to chase after Inari and Tōka. As Tōka comes across Uka, learning how Inari's use of divine power causes Uka to weaken, with any further use potentially transferring all of Uka's divinity to Inari, turning her into a god herself, Inari comes across Uka's father, Susanoo-no-Mikoto, who gives her the courage to stand up against Kamu and the other gods, refusing to hand Uka over to people who just want to marry her for her power. As the arranged meetings are called off and Inari and Tōka return home, Amaterasu, learning Uka knows how to regain her powers from Inari, locks her up in a cave to keep her apart from humans.
9	"Fox, Twilight, Milky Way."; Transliteration: "Kitsune, Tasogare, Amanogawa." (Japanese: きつね、黄昏、天の川。)	March 12, 2014
After overhearing Kōji might allegedly like Inari, Minami asks him about the letter she gave to Inari, only to learn he never received it from her. The next day, as the school is tasked with clearing up the school grounds, Inari and her friends notice their other classmates are ignoring them. After Inari questions them why, they explain they were told to ignore them by Minami's close friend, Kyōko Kangetsu. Inari confronts Kyōko, who accuses her of throwing away Minami's letter so she could get closer to Kōji. When Kyōko and her friends take their anger out on Chika and injures her, Inari's hatred causes her divine power to spiral out of control and trigger an earthquake. Learning of this, Uka uses what power she has to send her spirit to Inari's side and put her power back under control. As the students are reassembled, Minami scolds Kyōko. Wanting her to act on her behalf, Inari apologizes about the letter, with Minami respecting Inari for telling the boy she likes, someone else's feelings. Afterwards, Inari learns from Miya and Tōka Uka is about to fade away as the result of Inari using too much of her power. With help from Kon and the other spirits of the shrine. Inari heads off to find Uka to return her divine power before it is too late.
10	"Inari, Konkon, ABCs of Love."; Transliteration: "Inari, Konkon, Koi Iroha." (Japanese: いなり、こんこん、恋いろは。)	March 19, 2014
Fox spirits from shrines all over Japan gather together to take Inari to the Celestial Plains, soon arriving at the cave where Uka is being held. As Inari struggles to open the sealed door on her own, Kon, Toshi, and the other fox spirits all help her out, managing to open it a fraction of the way so Inari can see Uka. Uka laments she shouldn't have given Inari divine power if it would only cause her misery, but nonetheless Inari continues to open the door, her efforts convincing Amaterasu to let her inside the cave. Upon reuniting with each other and apologizing for keeping secrets from each other, Inari returns her divine power to Uka, restoring her back to normal, before returning to the human world and reuniting with her friends. Afterwards, Uka convinces Amaterasu to let continue to stay in the human world whilst Inari, despite no longer being able to see her, knows she is watching over her.
11 (OVA)	"Inari, Konkon, When the Cicadas Cry."; Transliteration: "Inari, Konkon, Semishigure." (Japanese: いなり、コンコン、蝉しぐれ。)	June 26, 2014
One day, Kon, desiring to become a stronger familiar, transforms into a human form and ventures off into town. There, she encounters Kōji's younger brother, Shiro, who had run away from home after getting into an argument with Kōji, who told him he couldn't play fireworks with their mother because of her work. Kon ends up having to put up with Shiro's selfishness, until they are both found by Inari, who had heard about the situation from Kōji. After quickly deducing Kon's identity, Inari accompanies Shiro to the supermarket where his mother works, with Shiro becoming upset when he sees her mother being busy and running off yet again. Wanting to defuse the situation, Inari transforms into Shiro's mother and offers to play with fireworks with him and Kōji, only to find the reason he was crying because he realised he was bothering his mother at work. In the end, Shiro plays fireworks with Kōji and Inari, before their mother manages to sort out a shift change to spend some time with them, whilst Kon learns something from her experience.
