= Active Raid =

Japanese anime television series

- Key Visual

アクティヴレイド (Akutivu Reido)
- Manga
- Written by: Kouhei Ueda
- Published by: Shueisha
- Magazine: Shōnen Jump+
- Original run: January 7, 2016 – July 28, 2016
- Volumes: 1
- Novel

Active Raid: Kidō Kyōshūshitsu Dai-Hakkei the Novel: Sorezore no Daihachi
- Written by: Kazuyoshi Yamamoto
- Illustrated by: Shun Saeki
- Published by: Shueisha
- Published: July 4, 2016
- Anime television series
- Directed by: Gorō Taniguchi (chief director); Noriaki Akitaya
- Produced by: Umeda Kazusuna; Sawada Tomohisa; Hiroyuki Birukawa
- Written by: Naruhisa Arakawa
- Music by: Kōtarō Nakagawa
- Studio: Production IMS; Orange (3DCG)
- Licensed by: SA/SEA: Medialink
- Original network: Tokyo MX, TV Aichi, Sun TV, KBS, BS Nittele, TBS, NTV
- Original run: January 7, 2016 – September 27, 2016
- Episodes: 24
- icon

Active Raid: Kidō Kyōshūshitsu Daihachigakari (Japanese: アクティヴレイド 機動強襲室第八係, Hepburn: Akutivu Reido Kidō Kyōshūshitsu Daihachigakari; lit. "Active Raid: Public Mobile Assault Unit Eight") is a Japanese anime television series produced by Production IMS. Orange produced the 3D CG, with Gorō Taniguchi as chief director. It started airing in January 2016. The anime was split into two seasons, the first half aired in January, while the second half aired in July 2016.

== Plot ==
Active Raid takes place in the near future with advanced technology, particularly a system known as ACTIVE (Armored Combined Tactical Intelligence Vanguard Elements). Due to the abundance of serious crime around the world, police forces begin to use ACTIVE technology along with powered armor mobile suits known as Will Wears. The series focuses on one such police unit in Japan known as Unit 8.

== Characters ==
=== Unit 8 ===
A police unit that is authorized to use Will Wears and the ACTIVE system. Due to their collateral damage of city infrastructure, Unit 8 has a bad reputation within the police force and public media. While the Japanese title of the anime only refers to them as "Public Mobile Assault Unit Eight", official materials translate their title as "Special Public Security Fifth Division Third Mobile Assault Eighth Unit."

Asami Kazari (花咲里 あさみ, Kazari Asami)
Voiced by: Ari Ozawa
A new girl in Unit 8, she was assigned to monitor Unit 8 due to their bad reputation, and possibly to take steps in improving their activities. Like Sena, she is serious and prefers to stick to the law. She operates the Oscar VI Fine Familia. After the Logos incident she becomes the leader of the new Unit 9, and her reputation becomes even worse than Unit 8's. She usually utters English phrases in their conversations.
Takeru Kuroki (黒騎 猛, Kuroki Takeru)
Voiced by: Nobunaga Shimazaki
A Lieutenant and one of Unit 8's Willwearers, he operates the Oscar 2 Strike Interceptor. He has an enthusiastic personality and is laid-back when it comes to proper police procedure. Despite the difference in personality, he considers himself to be on good terms with his more serious co-workers. After the Logos incident he voluntarily befriends Mythos and even adopts him as a younger brother. The reveal that Inagi had been manipulating the Wilwear crimes to achieve his goals shatters his former reverence towards him.
Soichiro Sena (瀬名 颯一郎, Sena Sōichirō)
Voiced by: Takahiro Sakurai
A Lieutenant and one of Unit 8's Willwearers, he operates the Oscar 1 Elf Sigma. Unlike Takeru, he is serious and describes himself as "person who separate trash" while Takeru is "person who does not pick up trash." At the beginning of series, he considers leaving Unit 8 but later changes his mind, realizing that Unit 8 is where he fits in best. At the start of second half, he is seen to left the Unit and founded a new garbage collecting company. Sena still remain in the team as a civilian incorporate with the police to help them after a law established.
Haruka Hoshimiya (星宮 はるか, Hoshimiya Haruka)
Voiced by: Shizuka Ishigami
One of Unit 8's Operators, she has a cheerful personality and is a bit of an otaku, especially about trains. She operates the Oscar III Metistructure Ibuki.
Rin Yamabuki (山吹 凛, Yamabuki Rin)
Voiced by: Masayo Kurata
Leader of Unit 8. Often mistaken as younger because of her appearance. She handles the aftermath of Unit 8's collateral damage and often has to apologize for their actions. She operates the Oscar V Primavera Pantera. She was once engaged to Kotaro Inagi, but broke up to pursue their respective careers.
Yasuharu Funasaka (舩坂 康晴, Funasaka Yasuharu)
Voiced by: Tōru Ōkawa
The Section Chief of Unit 8. Despite his higher rank, he is lenient on Unit 8's activities and regularly attends social events with them. He operates the Oscar IV Kōtetsujin Nanakamado. He likes singing while off duty.
Madoka Amano (天野 円, Amano Madoka)
Voiced by: Saori Ōnishi
A quiet operator in Unit 8, who rarely speaks. She excels in hacking and used to be a legendary gambler called 'Bloody Mary'. After the Logos incident she leaves the police and creates her own detective agency, but remains in touch with her old coworkers.
Namihei Sado (佐渡 波平, Namihei Sado)/Kyokai-san (協会さん, Kyōkai-san)
Voiced by: Kōsuke Toriumi
The mechanic of Unit 8 in charge of the maintenance of the Willwears. When Unit 8 is almost disbanded, he reveals his name is Sado Namihei (佐渡 波平, Namihei Sado).
Emilia Edelman (エミリア・エデルマン, Emiria Ederuman)
Voiced by: Yukari Tamura
A new recruit of Unit 8 from Poland, operator of the Oscar VII Foundation Omega. For a time she feared using her Wear after an accident that left her trapped inside of it for 3 days, but she started to improve thanks to Takeru's help.
Marimo Kaburagi (鏑木 まりも, Kaburagi Marimo)
Voiced by: Aimi Tanaka
The second new recruit of Unit 8. She has scopophobia and needs a pair of special glasses that blur the eyes of others to have a conversation.

=== Logos ===
Mythos (ミュトス, Myutosu)
Voiced by: Natsuki Hanae
A mysterious expert hacker watching over Tokyo, who takes an interest in Unit 8. He is the leader of the criminal movement Logos, providing Willwears to unstable or desperate people in order to provoke chaos. His real name is Tomohisa (巴弥, Tomohisa). When he was a young boy, he was a member of a cult. His parents led the cult in a mass suicide. Due to the infamy of the incident, Mythos's sister moved abroad, but he was not allowed to follow her. Feeling trapped by a society which failed him, he founded Logos, seeking to bend Japan to his own will. After months of being in custody, when Willwear crimes become more frequent, he's "adopted" by Takeru as his younger brother Jirou Kuroki, despite his protests.
Dog (ドック, Doggu)
Voiced by: Daiki Yamashita
Another hacker associated with Mythos, who seems to enjoy causing chaos. He goes rogue and starts attracting to much attention, believing he can do anything he wants with his Willwear, which makes his former associates try to kill him. He is stopped by Unit 8 but ends up in a coma after being hit by his own freezing grenade. His real name is Kakeru Domoto (堂本 カケル, Dōmoto Kakeru).

=== Unit 9 ===
Yuyuko Shimazakura (島桜 ゆゆこ, Shimazakura Yuyuko)
Voiced by: Ayaka Suwa
Aju Tomigusuku (豊見城 亜樹, Tomigusuku Aju)
Voiced by: Ayaka Suwa
Kanna Miyoshi (三好 環奈, Miyoshi Kanna)
Voiced by: Ayaka Suwa
Sosuke Torigoe (鳥越 宗助, Torigoe Sōsuke)
Voiced by: Kengo Kawanishi
Taiga Nawa (名和 大河, Nawa Taiga)
Voiced by: Kengo Kawanishi
Kyokai-sama (協会様, Kyōkai-sama)
Voiced by: Show Hayami
The mechanic of Unit 9 and Asami's second in command.

=== Others ===
Liko (リコ, Riko)
Voiced by: Tomoyo Kurosawa
An AI program akin to a mascot character, who makes various appearances throughout the series. Liko was in fact designed by Mythos to hijack computers throughout Japan for him, which eventually comes to fruition. After he surrenders to the authorities, he restores Liko to normal function.
Hinata Yamabuki (山吹 陽, Yamabuki Hinata)
Voiced by: Yūka Aisaka
Rin's younger sister. She attends Kouki Academy and is nearly identical in appearance to her sister. She's well versed in latin. When Hachijō is finally arrested, she punches him in the face for using her, with Rin Primavera Pantera's arm.
Tomoki Hachijō (八条 司稀, Hachijō Tomoki)
Voiced by: Taishi Murata
The student council president of Kouki Academy. He is secretly Bird, another member of Logos working with Mythos. He turns himself to the police in order to allow Mythos access the 'Ro' of the Orochi system. When Mythos is arrested, he leaves the country, but returns after finding out about Mythos release. He was hired by Inagi to enhance his popularity by providing Wilwears, but when he suggested a plan that was too much even to Inagi, he ordered his death. Easily faking his death, when Inagi was exposed, he hijacked an important satellite with the intention of making it crash and destroy Tokyo for the sake of his own amusement.
Miho Oshikouchi (凡河内 みほ, Ōshikouchi Miho)
Voiced by: Akeno Watanabe
An USDF Willwear pilot and Souichiro's ex-girlfriend. She operates the 'Senbukai' experimental unit. She worked together with Sena to take out a bomb planted in an abandoned building. She seems to be interested in returning with Souichiro, much to his consternation.
Kotaro Inagi (稲城 光太郎, Inagi Kōtarō)
Voiced by: Hikaru Midorikawa
A government official who is a friend of Rin and more lenient towards Unit 8. After his mentor dies under mysterious circumstances, he vows to become the next governor against the corruption of the government. After becoming governor he gives the Unit 8 much more freedom. His ambition of becoming Prime Minister and changing the country makes him ally with Hachijou, allowing him to commit crimes and orders his death when he outlives his usefulness. His crimes are finally exposed when a video of him blackmailing a forensics doctor into labeling the murder of his mentor as suicide is published by Mythos.
Eriko Kominato (小湊 恵里子, Kominato Eriko)
Voiced by: Sayaka Ohara
A-ko (A子, Ēko)
Voiced by: Juri Kimura
A pickpocket girl that's arrested by Takeru on the first episode. She briefly appears on every episode. It is revealed in the final episode that she's one of Hachijou's partners.
Abigail Martinez (アビゲイル・マルチネス, Abigeru Maruchinesu)
Voiced by: Satomi Arai
The foulmouthed chief of mechanics of Sena's new garbage collecting company.

== Media ==
=== Anime ===
The anime is directed by Noriaki Akitaya while Goro Taniguchi served as chief director. Naruhisa Arakawa provides the script. Manga artist Shun Saeki designed the characters while Naoko Nishida adapted the style into anime. Kotaro Nakagawa composed the music. The animation is done by Production IMS, and Orange is producing the 3D CG. The anime started broadcasting in January 2016, with the second season in July 2016.

No.	Title	Original release date
1	"Code Number 538" "Kōdo nanbā 538" (Japanese: コードNo.538)	January 7, 2016
2	"Academy Destruction" "Gakuen hōkai" (Japanese: 学園崩壊)	January 14, 2016
3	"Challenge From the Arena" "Arīna kara no chōsen" (Japanese: アリーナからの挑戦)	January 21, 2016
4	"Holding Airspace" "Senkai kūiki" (Japanese: 旋回空域)	January 28, 2016
5	"Poker Face of Erasure" "Shōshitsu no pōkāfeisu" (Japanese: 消失のポーカーフェイス)	February 4, 2016
6	"Dreams Beyond the Twilight" "Yume wa, kare no kata tasogare" (Japanese: 夢は、彼の方黄昏)	February 11, 2016
7	"Long Rail Life" "Rongurēruraifu" (Japanese: ロングレールライフ)	February 18, 2016
8	"Ulti-maid-ronde" "Arutimeidorondo" (Japanese: アルティメイドロンド)	February 25, 2016
9	"In the Name of Logos" "Rogosu no na no moto ni" (Japanese: ロゴスの名のもとに)	March 3, 2016
10	"The Invisible Conqueror" "Sugata naki seifuku-sha" (Japanese: 姿なき征服者)	March 10, 2016
11	"Japan Style" "Japan sutairu" (Japanese: ジャパンスタイル)	March 17, 2016
12	"For Whom Does Order Exist?" "Dare ga tame no chitsujo" (Japanese: 誰がための秩序)	March 24, 2016
13	"The Man from the West" "Nishi kara kita otoko" (Japanese: 西から来た男)	July 12, 2016
14	"Endless Avenger" "Hate naki fukushū-sha" (Japanese: 果てなき復讐者)	July 19, 2016
15	"Angel and God of Destruction" "Tenshi to hakai-shin" (Japanese: 天使と破壊神)	July 26, 2016
16	"Mythos, Once More" "Futatabi no myutosu" (Japanese: 再びのミュトス)	August 2, 2016
17	"Who Benefits?" "Risuru wa dare ka" (Japanese: 利するは誰か)	August 9, 2016
18	"Rudra of the Counterattack" "Gyakushū no rudora" (Japanese: 逆襲のルドラ)	August 16, 2016
19	"Absolute Peeping Declaration" "Zettai pīpingu sengen" (Japanese: 絶対ピーピング宣言)	August 23, 2016
20	"The Stranger in the Wind" "Kotokunibito wa kaze no naka" (Japanese: 異邦人は風のなか)	August 30, 2016
21	"Unit 8, Don't Mobolize" "Dai hachi kakari Shutsugeki sezu" (Japanese: 第八係 出撃せず)	September 6, 2016
22	"A Farewell Banquet" "Ketsubetsu no utage" (Japanese: 訣別の宴)	September 13, 2016
23	"Dream of an Idol" "Gūzō no yume" (Japanese: 偶像の夢)	September 20, 2016
24	"Wonderful Days" "Subarashikinichijō" (Japanese: 素晴らしき日常)	September 27, 2016
