= Date A Live season 2 =

2014 Japanese anime series

Date A Live II
- Season 2
- Second season anime key visual
- No. of episodes: 10

Release
- Original network: Tokyo MX
- Original release: April 12 – June 14, 2014

Season chronology
- ← Previous; Date A Live Next → Date A Live III

The second season of Date A Live, titled Date A Live II, is an anime series adapted from the light novels of the same title written by Kōshi Tachibana and illustrated by Tsunako. The story follows the adventures of Shido Itsuka and the Spirits, supernatural female entities that have fallen in love with him. It was produced by Production IMS and directed by Keitaro Motonaga, the second season, covering volumes 5 to 7, ran from April 12, 2014, to June 14, 2014. The opening theme is "Trust in You" by sweet ARMS while the ending theme is "Day to Story" by Kaori Sadohara.

== Episodes ==
No. overall	No. in season	Title (Note: All English titles are taken from Funimation.)	Original release date	Ref.
13	1	"Daily Life"; Transliteration: "Deirī Raifu" (Japanese: デイリー・ライフ)	April 12, 2014	
Shido is awoken by the troubles of both Tohka and Yoshino, and manages to resolve the conflict. Meanwhile, Origami is suspended for two months from the AST. While eating breakfast, Shido receives a text from Origami, and they discuss the events that happened a month ago. Tohka, while cleaning Shido's room, discovers a suitcase (for their school-trip) that resembles one she'd seen in a dramatic film on the television. Tohka grows worried, and rushes to find Shido, who is with Origami. Shido tries to make it up to Tohka by getting her some kinako bread on the way home, but all the kinako bread is gone in all the bread stores! Kotori's assistant bought it all for the crew, alarming Kotori to hand some to Shido and Tohka that would've nearly ruined the date. After making dinner, he notices that the lock of his suitcase is broken, so he goes out to meet up with Origami once more. Tohka again recalls the scheme of the drama film, this time catching Shido and Origami together, and imagines that Shido is abandoning her for Origami. Tohka gets jealous, awakening some of her powers, and runs off while carrying Shido's suitcase. Tohka's unsealed powers begin to create a spatial quake, and Shido rushes to find her. He later finds Tohka in their "special place", and Tohka tries to prevent him from leaving with Origami. Shido explains that it is all a misunderstanding, but Tohka cannot control her powers and hits Shido with shockwaves. Shido is unharmed and manages to seals Tohka's powers again. Meanwhile, Isaac Westcott and Ellen Mathers of DEM Industries, an organization with an interest in Spirits, are scheming a plan for Tohka; Kurumi plots to kill the First Spirit.
14	2	"Children of the Storm"; Transliteration: "Gufū no miko" (Japanese: 颶風の御子)	April 19, 2014	
After a very awkward moment in Shido's class, where Tohka tries switching genders in an effort to bunk with Shido, the class goes on a field trip to Arubi Island. Throughout the entire trip, Origami and Tohka inadvertently annoy Shido in an effort to win his affections. Meanwhile, DEM Industries and Ellen Mathers as a photographer, begins stalking Tohka on the island. But Ellen has to deal with Ai, Mai and Mii who has a sudden interest in her, as a humorous distraction. Sometime later, Shido and Tohka ran out when a massive hurricane appears out of nowhere. Three trash cans strike Tohka, knocking her out, while two Spirits viciously battle overhead. When Shido tries to intervene, the "Berserk" Spirits Yuzuru and Kaguya, decide their next battle in their long rivalry will be over winning Shido's heart (much to Shido's dismay). When the two girls return with Shido and an unconscious Tohka to his class, Origami seemingly becomes enraged over her new competition. As Tamae tries to arrange for the girls to become students in the class, Kaguya and Yuzuru explain that they were once a single Spirit named Yamai, and that their contests are in an effort to determine whose personality will remain when the two fuse into Yamai once more. Later that day, an incident occurs when the twins make an effort to seduce Shido by switching signs. Things get worse when Tohka shows up along with the rest of the class. Worse of all, Shido is knocked outside the spa into very cold water.
15	3	"Two Wishes"; Transliteration: "Futatsu no negai" (Japanese: ふたつの願い)	April 26, 2014	
The twin spirits, still trying to seduce Shido, start cuddling up to him in bed. The situation worsens when one of his teachers walks in on the ordeal. Later, Shido plans to seal the Yamai twins' powers without letting one of them win, all in an effort to avoid both the unpredictability of the loser, and what would happen to the loser's personality. During their contest, they have Shido apply sunscreen to their backs and become aroused by the process. Later, the Yamai sisters team up with Shido to take on Tohka and Origami in a volleyball game, with the former winning the match. Each twin then privately pulls Shido aside, both telling him that the other sister should be the one who gets to remain. Later in the afternoon, Origami is ambushed by a strange mech-like being. Meanwhile, Shido talks with Tohka about the twins' selfless decision to let the other one live, and both overhear the conversation. This leads to the Yamai twins getting into a heated argument, and both summon their Astral Dress.
16	4	"Manifestation"; Transliteration: "Kengen" (Japanese: 顕現)	May 3, 2014	
The woman stalking Tohka and Shido, Ellen, finally reveals her true colors and orders a pack of mechs (called Bandersnatch units) to capture Tohka. During the clash, Tohka is incapacitated and captured, leading Shido to call upon her sword, <Sandalphon>. By doing so, he manages to fend off the Bandersnatch and rescue Tohka. Meanwhile, Kannazuki and his crew aboard the Fraxinus gets attacked by an enemy airship. Kannazuki launches a counterattack after deflecting several shots, leading to a full-scale dogfight between the two ships. Back at Shido's battle, Ellen falls down into a pit trap (oddly enough) dug by Ai, Mai, and Mii, allowing Shido and Tohka to escape. Running to Kaguya and Yuzuru, he summons Tohka's power to intervene in the duel and convinces both the girls to forget about becoming Yamai and instead focus on enjoying their lives together. Noticing the airship that attacked the Fraxinus, the twins combine their powers and eviscerate the enemy ship with one massive blast. After the incident, Shido successfully seals the Yamai twins' powers, stripping them of their clothes just as Tohka arrives. Meanwhile, Kotori learns from a strange man that Shido has manifested a Spirit's power and she might have to kill Shido if the situation worsens.
17	5	"Diva"; Transliteration: "Dīva" (Japanese: ディーヴァ)	May 10, 2014	
The suspension placed on Origami is finally lifted, and Ryōko receives several complaints before Jessica Bailey takes over as AST's new leader. Shido is selected as the organizer of the Ten-Oh Festival. After a spatial quake alarm goes off, Shido gets to work before a new Spirit, Diva, makes her first appearance. She's proving to be more of a challenge than the other Spirits, when the AST intervenes and tries to take her down. Shido finds himself in a troubling situation, and Diva manages to escape. It is later disclosed to Shido that Diva, aka Miku Izayoi, is a full-blown idol that hates all men, meaning he has no chance of winning her over. This leads the Fraxinus crew to decide that Shido has to cross-dress as "Shiori" in order for him to get close to Miku, an idea two episodes ago in which Tohka and Origami fight over before. Approaching her on stage as a girl, Shiori quickly befriends Miku before she invites him to tea. During their sit-down, Miku strongly requests Shiori to transfer to her school as a close contact using her manipulative voice powers. Shiori is unaffected, leading Miku to become suspicious of "her". Failing to make a deal, Miku challenges Shiori to a competition at the Festival wherein the loser has to offer herself to the winner. Meanwhile, Jessica Bailey from the DEM instructs AST to capture Tohka and Shido.
18	6	"Girls Music"; Transliteration: "Gāruzu Myūjikku" (Japanese: ガールズ・ミュージック)	May 17, 2014	
Mana finally awakens from her battle with Kurumi since season 1. For the upcoming competition, Ai, Mai, and Mii prepare a band of their own to compete against Miku's. Elsewhere, Origami hears from Ryōko about the usurp mission to capture Tohka and Shido during the Festival. Serving as Head Maid in a Maid Café with the Yamai twins employed, Shido (as Shiori again) is handing out posters when Miku arrives and asks "her" out on a date, despite Shiori's annoyance at Miku's arrogance. After the date, Shido discovers that the bandmates were manipulated by Miku's controlling voice power and will not perform for the concert. Fraxinus cuts the stage's power to give Shido some time, but Miku gets the upper hand with her Astral Dress. The AST, led by Jessica, is targeting Tengu Square when Ryōko and Origami (piloting the "White Licorice") interfere. Kaguya and Yuzuru, being "professionals", back up Tohka and Shido to perform as best as they could, despite outside interference.
19	7	"The Army-Destroying Songstress (Gabriel)"; Transliteration: "Hagun Utahime (Gaburieru)" (Japanese: 破軍歌姫(ガブリエル))	May 24, 2014	
The score results for the annual contest come in and, even though Miku wins best performance, the support of Raizen's Maid Café earns Shido enough to be declared the winner. Dejected and refusing to accept Shiori's friendship, Miku unleashes her angel <Solo>, brainwashing everyone in the crowd but Tohka due to her ear phones. Miku orders the girls to seize Shiori. Running her fingers along Shiori's body, Miku discovers that the "she" is actually a guy, leading to her total shock and disgust. To make matters worse, Fraxinus and Kotori have also fallen under Miku's control, and Ellen abducts Tohka. Shido manages to escape, but is now a fugitive in the city. Amidst the chaos, Shido is surprised to see Kurumi and begs her for help. Meanwhile, Tohka awakens in the DEM facility, restrained.
20	8	"The Promise to Keep"; Transliteration: "Hatasubeki Yakusoku" (Japanese: 果たすべき約束)	May 31, 2014	
Shido and Kurumi arrive back at the Tengu Square to reason with Miku. Obnoxious she attempts to assault Shido, but Kurumi's power intercepts as she's resistible to Miku. As Kurumi distracts Kaguya, Yuzuru, and Yoshino; Kurumi traps Miku with Shido in a dark void to have a brief private conversation. Despite his honest ambitions, she still will not listen. So Shido makes his way to rescue Tohka alone. Westcott torments Tohka for his ambition to harness her power in despair. Fake spatial quake alarms are set off to evacuate all civilians. Kurumi holds off a pack of Bandersnatch units, as Mana appears and everyone aboard Fraxinus are back in their right minds. Meanwhile, Miku struggles about Shido's ambitions, whether he actually cares for others than himself. Infiltrating the DEM Industries, Mana and Jessica engage, communications are jammed, Shido summons the Sandalphon to swipe the guards and enduring Kotori's healing ability.
21	9	"The Truth About Miku"; Transliteration: "Miku no Shinjitsu" (Japanese: 美九の真実)	June 7, 2014	
Shido almost got caught until Miku makes an entry as she commands the Spirits to join the battlefield. Origami in a convention suit partners with Mana. While Shido and Miku argue, he reveals that Kurumi learned how Miku acquire her Spirit power from Phantom (like Kotori), and she finally tells him that she used to be a splendid singer. But one day she rejected a TV producer's career offer which leads to her disgrace with bad rumors spreading around with no help from her anyone. She tried to reconnect with her fans but suffers psychogenic aphonia, resulting in losing her voice; this tension caused Miku to condemn humanity. Shido vows to keep his promise. Origami, Ratatoskr, terrorizes the territory to subdue Ellen when she's called to where Westcott was. Westcott makes his appearance when Shido and Miku find Tohka. Shido is stabbed by Ellen with Tohka losing control over his death.
22	10	"Inversion"; Transliteration: "Hanten" (Japanese: 反転)	June 14, 2014	
Tohka is turned into an Inverse negative form with her counterpart sword Qliphoth and has no memory. Mana and Jessica reach the concluded battle. Jessica, dying in Mana's arms, tells how she always felt jealous and wanted to become strong for the DEM, Mana made her decision to dishonor Westcott. Westcott decides to retreat, although he briefly calls Shido "Takamiya". Tohka brutally attacks then Miku becomes vulnerable. Yoshino, Yoshinon, Kaguya and Yuzuru regain their sanity. Shido took the hit to protect Miku. Tohka swings the sword of demise on Shido, but Yoshino, Yoshinon, Kaguya and Yuzuru helps Shido from being close to death. Shido flies towards her reminding her of him; dropping the Sandalphon, he seals her power once more with a kiss restoring her back to normal. Kurumi continue her search for the captive Spirit. The next day, Miku who is happy, she purposely kisses Shido sealing her power after talking to her friends. Miku invites everyone to listen to her latest concert then announces to her "darling", stunning the crowd and questioning Shido what "darling" means by Tohka, Yoshino, Yoshinon, Kaguya and Yuzuru. Shido's future with girls is far from over.
