= Gonna be the Twin-Tail!! =

Japanese light novel series

- First light novel volume cover featuring the main character Soji Mitsuka as Tail Red

俺、ツインテールになります。 (Ore, Tsuintēru ni Narimasu.)
- Genre: Action, Magical girl, Romance
- Light novel
- Written by: Yume Mizusawa
- Illustrated by: Ayumu Kasuga
- Published by: Shogakukan
- Imprint: Gagaga Bunko
- Original run: June 19, 2012 – November 18, 2022
- Volumes: 22
- Manga
- Written by: Yume Mizusawa
- Illustrated by: Ryōta Yuzuki
- Published by: Square Enix
- Magazine: Monthly Big Gangan
- Original run: August 25, 2014 – June 25, 2015
- Volumes: 2
- Anime television series
- Directed by: Hiroyuki Kanbe
- Produced by: Atsushi Yoshikawa; Hirofumi Itō; Junya Okamoto; Reiichi Aoki; Shigeaki Arima; Tsuyoshi Tanaka
- Written by: Naruhisa Arakawa
- Music by: Yasuharu Takanashi
- Studio: Production IMS
- Licensed by: AUS: Madman Entertainment; NA: Funimation Entertainment; UK: Anime Limited
- Original network: TBS, CBC, SUN, BS-TBS
- English network: US: Funimation Channel
- Original run: October 9, 2014 – December 25, 2014
- Episodes: 12
- icon

Gonna be the Twin-Tail!! (Japanese: 俺、ツインテールになります。, Hepburn: Ore, Tsuin Tēru ni Narimasu.; lit. "I Will Become Twin-Tail"), abbreviated OreTwi (俺ツイ, Oretsui), is a Japanese light novel series written by Yume Mizusawa and illustrated by Ayumu Kasuga. Shogakukan has published 22 volumes under their Gagaga Bunko imprint since June 2012. It follows a trio of pigtail warriors saving Japan from galactic monsters. An anime adaptation produced by Production IMS aired in Japan from October 9 to December 25, 2014.

== Plot ==
High school boy Soji Mitsuka is obsessed with twintail hair. He meets a mysterious girl named Twoearle, who came from a parallel world to the planet Earth. When monsters appear and invade Japan, they feed off "attribute strength", the spiritual energy of humans. Twoearle entrusted Soji with Tail Gear, imaginary armor initiated by powerful twintail attributes. This allows Soji to transform into a girl and twintail warrior (ツインテイルズ関係者, tsuinteiruzu kankei-sha) branded Tail Red.

== Characters ==
=== Twintail Warriors ===
Soji Mitsuka (観束 総二, Mitsuka Soji) / Tail Red (テイルレッド, Teiru Reddo)
Soji (male) Voiced by: Nobunaga Shimazaki (Japanese); Austin Tindle (English)
Souji (female)/Tail Red Voiced by: Sumire Uesaka (Japanese); Bryn Apprill (English)
A high school boy of Yōgetsu Private Academy obsessed with pigtail hairstyles. He later meets a scientist girl named Twoearle arriving on Earth. When galactic monsters invade Japan, Soji receives a bracelet from Twoearle and becomes a twin tail warrior named Tail Red. Due to his alter ego being a celebrity, Soji becomes the leader of the Twintails. His weapon is Sword of Fire, Blazer Blade (炎の剣ブレイザーブレイド, Honō no Ken Bureizā Bureido). In volume 4, he gained two power-up forms: Riser Chain and Faller Chain. He later gains Ultimate Chain, after regaining his Twintail Elémera, which he lost to Tyrannoguildy.
Aika Tsube (津辺 愛香, Tsube Aika) / Tail Blue (テイルブルー, Teiru Burū)
Voiced by: Yūka Aisaka (Japanese); Sarah Wiedenheft (English)
A high school girl and Soji's friend. She has a complex with a flat chest on her body. She dislikes Twoearle for teasing her. Aika becomes a Twintail warrior and joins the team. She is a martial artist raised by her grandfather. She is known as Tail Blue when she transforms, and her weapon is Spear of Water, Wave Lance (水の槍ウェイブランス, Mizu no Yari Weibu Ransu). She also gains Eternal Chain.
Erina Shindō (神堂 慧理那, Shindō Erina) / Tail Yellow (テイルイエロー, Teiru Ierō)
Voiced by: Chinatsu Akasaki (Japanese); Mikaela Krantz (English)
The student council president of Yōgetsu Private Academy. Known as Tail Yellow in her transformed state, her weapon is Gun of Lightning, Vortex Blaster (雷の銃ヴォルテックスブラスター, Kaminari no Jū Vorutekkusu Burasutā). She is a closet masochist and exhibitionist, and gets aroused when she meets Soji. While being a Twintail warrior, she becomes a reckless fighter due to her maschostic ways. She is the only one of the twintails who at first could not use her power because of her denial, until she accepts it. Erina's twintail warrior form makes her whole body look a lot older and has a more well endowed figure. She gains Absolute Chain.
Twoearle (トゥアール, Tuāru) / Tail White (テイルホワイト, Teiru Howaito)
Voiced by: Maaya Uchida (Japanese); Morgan Garrett (English)
A scientist girl who came from another planet and the first Twin Tail Warrior. She teases Aika sometimes and often ends up grievously injured for it. Twoearle becomes a relative to Soji and Aika, and works at Yōgetsu Private Academy. Before arriving on Earth, she was the original Tail Blue who sacrificed her power to make the Twin Tail gear after her parallel world lost all attributes. She has expressed regret from losing her former home to Ultimegill. Before Soji became a successor, Twoearle had a limited form as Tail White for a few minutes. Though it compensates by being powerful over Soji's Ultimate Chain form.
Īsuna (イースナ, Īsuna) / Anko Īsuna (善沙 闇子, Īsuna Anko) / Tail Black (テイルブラック, Teiru Burakku) / Dark Grasper or Dark Glassper (ダークグラスパー, Dāku Gurasupā)
Voiced by: Yōko Hikasa (Japanese); Leah Clark (English)
A girl from a different world, yet from the same place as Twoearle. She is secretly a big fan of Twoearle and stalks her often. After Twoearle arrives on Earth, she joined the Ultimegill organization and receives her alter ego Dark Grasper. After finding Twoearle, she betrayed Evil Gill. She is known as Tail Black. Her weapon is Darkness Grave Moebius, and her weapon when she was in the Evil Gill was Sickle Grave of Darkness. Her real name is Īsuna (イースナ, Īsuna). As an idol, she uses the name Anko Īsuna (善沙 闇子, Īsuna Anko).

=== Others ===
Miharu Mitsuka (観束 未春, Mitsuka Miharu)
Voiced by: Hiromi Igarashi (Japanese); Jennifer Green (English)
Soji's widowed mother and the owner of the restaurant Adolescenza (アドレシェンツァ, Adoreshentsa). She is aware of her son's identity and supports him as she dreamed of being in a position. She allows Twoearle to stay with Soji.
Mikoto Sakuragawa (桜川 尊, Sakuragawa Mikoto)
Voiced by: Mao Ichimichi (Japanese); Michelle Rojas (English)
Erina's maid with an outstanding physical ability despite her job. At times, she works part time as a PE teacher for Yōgetsu Private Academy. She usually slips marriage registration forms in the boys' test slips with her name on them, or having Soji sign his name on it. It is clear that she is desperately looking and marrying someone before reaching 30.
Mega Neptune Mk. II (メガ・ネプチューン = MK.II)
Voiced by: Yukari Tamura (Japanese); Tia Ballard (English)
Anko's robot partner. Due to her long name, Anko calls her Megane (Japanese for glasses) for short which she dislikes.
Twin-Tail God (ツインテール合同, Tsuintēru Godo)
Voiced by: Shuichi Ikeda (Japanese); Kent Williams (English)
An imaginary being within Soji's body and subconsciousness.
Strawberry Twin (ストロベリーツイン, Sutoroberī Tsuin)
Voiced by: Rie Kugimiya (Japanese); Felecia Angelle (English)

A high school girl whom Soji rescued.

Emu Shindō (神堂 慧夢, Shindō Emu)
Voiced by: Kikuko Inoue (Japanese); Cynthia Cranz (English)
Erina's mother and the school's principal.

=== Ultimegill ===
Ultimegil (アルティメギル, Arutimegiru) is an organization of phantom-monsters called Elemelion who travel through different worlds, seeking a variety of "attributes". Although they are enemies of humanity, their majority are rather silly, comical, and behave much like otakus, often admiring cute girls, collecting dolls, and adoring the twintail girls. Having discovered Earth is rich in "attributes", they colonize and make plans to conquer Earth. Members include:

Dragguildy (ドラグギルディ, Doragugirudi)
Voiced by: Tetsu Inada (Japanese); Chris Rager (English)
The leader of the Ultimegil with a twintail fetish.
Lizardguildy (リザドギルディ, Rizadogirudi)
Voiced by: Tesshō Genda (Japanese); Cris George (English)
An Elemelion soldier with a doll-holding girl fetish.
Turtleguildy (タトルギルティ, Tatorugirudi)
Voiced by: Takaya Kuroda (Japanese); Greg Ayres (English)
An Elemelion soldier with a bloomer fetish.
Foxguildy (フォクスギルティ, Fokusugiruti)
Voiced by: Toshihiko Seki (Japanese); Eric Vale (English)
An Elemelion soldier with a ribbon fetish.
Swanguildy (スワンギルディ, Suwangirudi)
Voiced by: Nobuyuki Hiyama (Japanese); Aaron Roberts (English)
An Elemelion soldier with the swan attached to the front face.
Tigerguildy (タイガ・ギルディ, Taigagirudi)
Voiced by: Kenichirou Matsuda (Japanese); Jeff Johnson (English)
An Elemelion soldier with a swimsuit fetish.
Sparrowguildy (スパロウギルディ, Suparougirudi)
Voiced by: Chō (Japanese); Phil Parsons (English)
Krakeguildy (クラーケギルディ, Kurākegirudi)
An Elemelion soldier with a tentacle fetish.
Voiced by: Jūrōta Kosugi (Japanese); Jeremy Inman (English)
An Elemelion soldier with a flat chest fetish.
Leviaguildy (リヴァイアギルディ, Rivaiagirudi)
Voiced by: Toru Okawa (Japanese); Charles C. Campbell (English)
An Elemelion soldier with a breast fetish.
Buffaloguildy (バッファローギルディ, Baffarōgirudi)
Voiced by: Ryōta Takeuchi (Japanese); Brandon Potter (English)
An Elemelion soldier with a giant breast fetish.
Crabguildy (クラブギルディ, Kurabugirudi)
Voiced by: Nobunaga Shimazaki (Japanese); Chris Guerrero (English)
An Elemelion soldier with a backneck fetish.
Papillonguildy (パピヨンギルディ, Papiyongirudi)
Voiced by: Shin-ichiro Miki (Japanese); J. Michael Tatum (English)
An Elemelion soldier with a lip fetish.
Alligatorguildy (アリゲギルディ, Arigegirudi)
Voiced by: Hidefumi Takemoto (Japanese); Marcus D. Stimac (English)
Hedgehogguildy (ヘッジホッグギルディ, Hejjihoggugirudi)
Voiced by: Kenta Sasa (Japanese); Garret Storms (English)
An Elemelion soldier with a spiky fetish.
Kerberosguildy (スパイダギルディ, Supaidāgirudi)
Voiced by: Kanehira Yamamoto (Japanese); Chuck Huber (English)
An Elemelion soldier with a braid fetish.
Owlguildy (オウルギルディ, Ōrugirudi)
Voiced by: Mitsuo Iwata (Japanese); Barry Yandell (English)
An Elemelion soldier with a literature fetish.
Spiderguildy (スパイダギルディ, Supaidāgirudi)
Voiced by: Shō Hayami (Japanese); David Wald (English)
An Elemelion soldier with a male crossdressing fetish.
Fleaguildy (フリー・ギルディ, Furīgirudi)
Voiced by: Taiten Kusunoki (Japanese); Ian Sinclair (English)
An Elemelion soldier with a leg fetish.
Wormguildy (ワーム・ギルディ, Wāmugirudi)
Voiced by: Mika Kanai (Japanese); Alex Moore (English)
An Elemelion soldier with a crossdressing fetish.
Snailguildy (スネイル・ギルディ, Suneirugirudi)
Voiced by: Nobutoshi Canna (Japanese); Tyson Rinehart (English)
An Elemelion soldier with a snail shell.

== Media ==
=== Light novels ===
Gonna be the Twin-Tail!! began as a light novel series, written by Yume Mizusawa with illustrations by Ayumu Kasuga. Mizusawa originally entered the first novel in the series, originally titled Sore wa, Twintail no Isekai (それは、ついんてーるの異世界, Sore wa, Tsuintēru no Isekai), into Shogakukan's sixth Shogakukan Light Novel Prize in 2011 and the novel won the judge's prize. The first novel was published by Shogakukan on June 19, 2012, under the Gagaga Bunko imprint, and fourteen novels were released on December 19, 2017.

The 16th volume of the series was released in October 2018, and the 17th volume on March 19, 2019. The series ended with the 21st volume (22nd overall) on November 18, 2022, while the first volume was released in English on Shogkukan's novel app on January 23, 2025.

No.	Release date	ISBN
1	June 19, 2012	978-4-09-451346-2
2	November 20, 2012	978-4-09-451375-2
3	March 19, 2013	978-4-09-451398-1
4	July 18, 2013	978-4-09-451424-7
4.5	March 17, 2017	978-4-09-451662-3
5	December 18, 2013	978-4-09-451454-4
6	June 18, 2014	978-4-09-451491-9
7	September 18, 2014	978-4-09-451508-4
8	December 18, 2014	978-4-09-451524-4
9	April 17, 2015	978-4-09-451543-5
10	October 20, 2015	978-4-09-451576-3
11	March 18, 2016	978-4-09-451599-2
12	October 18, 2016	978-4-09-451635-7
13	August 18, 2017	978-4-09-451692-0
14	December 19, 2017	978-4-09-451711-8
15	April 18, 2018	978-4-09-451729-3
16	October 18, 2018	978-4-09-451754-5
17	March 19, 2019	978-4-09-451776-7
18	September 18, 2019	978-4-09-451809-2
19	February 18, 2020	978-4-09-451829-0
20	December 18, 2020	978-4-09-451876-4
21	November 18, 2022	978-4-09-453095-7

=== Manga ===
A manga adaptation titled Ore, Twintail ni Narimasu π (俺、ツインテールになります。π, Ore, Tsuintēru ni Narimasu.; Gonna be the Twin-Tail π) by Ryōta Suzuki was serialized in Square Enix's Monthly Big Gangan magazine from August 25, 2014 to June 25, 2015, and was compiled into two tankōbon volumes.

No.	Release date	ISBN
1	December 18, 2014	978-4-7575-4495-6
2	August 25, 2015	978-4-7575-4726-1

=== Anime ===
An anime television series adaptation produced by Production IMS and directed by Hiroyuki Kanbe, aired in Japan from October 9 to December 25, 2014. The opening theme is "Gimme! Revolution" (ギミー！レボリューション, Gimī! Reboryūshon) by Maaya Uchida. The ending theme is "Twin-Tail Dreamer!" (ツインテール・ドリーマー！, Tsuintēru Dorīmā!) by Sumire Uesaka, Yūka Aisaka, and Chinatsu Akasaki. Both singles for the themes were released on October 22, 2014. The anime was licensed by Funimation in North America, and in the Middle East, North Africa, and Europe (excluding North America, Scandinavia, and United Kingdom) by Crunchyroll, and AnimeLab in Australia and New Zealand.

==== Episode list ====
No.	Title	Directed by	Written by	Original release date
1	"Earth Is A Twintails Planet"; Transliteration: "Chikyū wa Tsuintēru no Hoshi" (Japanese: 地球はツインテールの星)	Tōru Kitahata	Naruhisa Arakawa	October 9, 2014
After meeting Twoearle, Soji Mitsuka uses a Tail Gear bracelet and transforms into Tailred, before defeating Lizardguildy.
2	"A Twintail Mystery!?"; Transliteration: "Tsuintēru na Nazo!?" (Japanese: ツインテールな謎！？)	Yoshimasa Ishiya	Naruhisa Arakawa	October 16, 2014
Soji and Aika Tsube begin living with Twoearle. They build a base underneath the house. Tailred defeats Turtleguildy to save other girls.
3	"Cerulean Storm Waves! Tail Blue"; Transliteration: "Aoki Dotō! Teiru Burū" (Japanese: 青き怒濤！テイルブルー)	Masayuki Matsumoto	Naruhisa Arakawa	October 23, 2014
Aika receives the blue bracelet, transforms into Tailblue, and defeats Foxguildy.
4	"Ferocity: Twin Battle"; Transliteration: "Gekiretsu: Tsuin Batoru" (Japanese: 激烈ツインバトル)	Masashi Abe	Naruhisa Arakawa	October 30, 2014
Erina tells Soji and Aika about having the club. Before being defeated, Dragguildy sends the information about Tailred and Tailblue to the organization. Twoearle reveals she was once Tailblue, but her planet was destroyed due to her pride.
5	"The Third Twintail Warrior!"; Transliteration: "San'nin-me no Tsuintēru!" (Japanese: 三人目の戦士(ツインテール)！)	Yoshimasa Ishiya	Masaki Wachi	November 6, 2014
Erina notices about Soji and Aika, when examining the bracelets invisible to normal people until transforming. Before helping Soji, Erina receives the yellow bracelet and transforms into Tailyellow. Meanwhile, Ultimegil meets up with Dark Grasper.
6	"Break Release! Tail Yellow"; Transliteration: "Bureiku Rerīzu! Teiru Ierō" (Japanese: 完全解放(ブレイクレリーズ)！テイルイエロー)	Shū Watanabe	Masaki Wachi	November 13, 2014
After Tailblue defeats Crabguildy and Leviaguildy, Tailyellow notices that she lacks power and has Tailred train her for the first battle. After Tailyellow defeats Krakeguildy, Dark Grasper arrives on Earth.
7	"Passionate Debut! Dark Grasper"; Transliteration: "Netsuretsu Debyū! Dāku Gurasupā" (Japanese: 熱烈見参(デビュー)！暗黒眼鏡女子(ダークグラスパー))	Masayuki Matsumoto	Naruhisa Arakawa	November 20, 2014
Dark Grasper leaves Earth and reports to the organization about the girls. As Anko Īsuna, she attends the concert as a Japanese idol on live television. Tailyellow defeats Papillonguildy and Dark Grasper betrays Kerberosguildy. Emu and Mikoto discuss the plan about Erina.
8	"Erina's First!"; Transliteration: "Erina, Hajimete no!" (Japanese: 慧理那、はじめての！)	Tatsuma Minamikawa; Tōru Kitahata	Masaki Wachi	November 27, 2014
After defeating Owlguildy, Soji and Erina disagree with Emu about their marriage. Anko uses her fame to spread news in Japan, but Soji plans to end it.
9	"Smash It! Glass On in Chaotic Infinite"; Transliteration: "Uchiyabure! Kaoshikku Infinitto" (Japanese: 打ち破れ！暗黒幻夢(カオシック・インフィニット))	Yōsuke Hashiguchi	Naruhisa Arakawa	December 4, 2014
Dark Grasper learns that Twoearle is with Soji. Tailred, Tailblue, and Tailyellow interfere the concert, but they are cornered by Dark Grasper. Twoearle arrives in time to save the girls and confront Dark Grasper. After resisting the illusions, Tailred uses the combined counter-offensive power between herself, Tailblue, and Tailyellow, in order to stop Dark Grasper. Before leaving with Mega Neptune Mk. II, Anko kisses Tailred.
10	"Why!? Nothing Is Going Right For Me"; Transliteration: "Naze da!? Ore, Zetsufuchō" (Japanese: なぜだ！？俺、絶不調)	Masashi Abe	Masaki Wachi	December 11, 2014
When Tailred, Tailblue, and Tailyellow meet Spiderguildy, he counterattacks the ability and overwhelms Tailred, before leaving. Soji notices his body changing due to Anko's kiss, and loses his male form in his dream. After defeating Fleaguildy, Aika finds a girl identified as Soji.
11	"Red in Dire Straits"; Transliteration: "Reddo Zettai Zetsumei" (Japanese: レッド絶体絶命)	Yoshimasa Ishiya	Masaki Wachi	December 18, 2014
Soji examines the malfunctioning bracelet and retains the body of a girl, despite the transformation. After Tailblue and Tailyellow defeat Wormguildy and Snailguildy, Spiderguildy transforms into Arachneguildy.
12	"Long Live Twintail"; Transliteration: "Tsuintēru yo Towa ni" (Japanese: ツインテールよ永遠に)	Tōru Kitahata; Hiroyuki Kanbe	Naruhisa Arakawa	December 25, 2014
Arachneguildy returns to Earth and turns everyone into twintails. However, this backfires, after they revert normally and Tailred defeats him. Dark Grasper has the ship departing through outer space. After Soji reverts into a boy, he and the girls embark on a new life together.
