= Production IMS =

Japanese animation studio

Production IMS Co., Ltd.
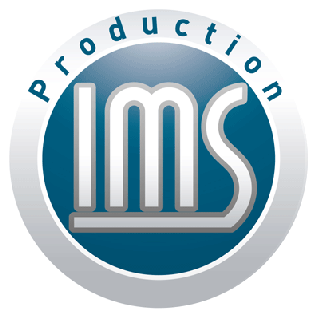
- Native name: 株式会社プロダクションアイムズ
- Romanized name: Kabushiki-gaisha Purodakushon Aimuzu
- Type: Kabushiki gaisha
- Industry: Japanese animation
- Founded: February 14, 2013; 13 years ago
- Defunct: October 11, 2018; 8 years ago
- Successor: JFK/Quad
- Headquarters: Nerima, Tokyo, Japan
- Key people: Yoshiyuki Matsuzaki (CEO)
- Website: ims.tokyo

Production IMS Co., Ltd. (Japanese: 株式会社プロダクションアイムズ, Hepburn: Kabushiki-gaisha Purodakushon Aimuzu), or Production IMS, was a Japanese animation studio established on February 14, 2013, by former staff members from AIC Spirits. Its headquarters were located in Nerima, Tokyo, Japan.

== Financial problems ==
On December 20, 2017, animator Teru Miyazaki posted then deleted a tweet on Twitter stating that an anime studio, implied to be Production IMS, was not paying its animators. On June 7 the following year, credit research company Tokyo Shoko Research reported that Production IMS began consolidating its debts and that the staff was considering filing for bankruptcy. The company did later file for bankruptcy on September 21, 2018, and closed on October 11 of the same year.

== List of works ==
=== Television series ===
- Inari, Konkon, Koi Iroha (January 15, 2014 – March 19, 2014)
- Date A Live II (April 11, 2014 – June 13, 2014)
- Gonna be the Twin-Tail!! (October 9, 2014 – December 25, 2014)
- The Testament of Sister New Devil (January 7, 2015 – March 25, 2015)
- Castle Town Dandelion (July 2, 2015 – September 17, 2015)
- The Testament of Sister New Devil Burst (October 9, 2015 – December 11, 2015)
- Active Raid (January 7, 2016 – September 27, 2016) – Co-production with Orange
- Hundred (April 4, 2016 – June 20, 2016)
- High School Fleet (April 9, 2016 – June 25, 2016)
- Hybrid × Heart Magias Academy Ataraxia (July 5, 2016 – September 20, 2016)
- Takunomi (January 11, 2018 – March 29, 2018)

=== Original video animations ===
- Inari Konkon: Cicada Chorus (2014)
- Date A Live: Encore (2014)
- The Testament of Sister New Devil (2015)
- The Testament of Sister New Devil Burst (2016)
- High School Fleet (2017)
- The Testament of Sister New Devil: Departures (2018)

=== Films ===
- Heaven's Lost Property Final – The Movie: Eternally My Master (April 26, 2014)
- Date A Live: Mayuri Judgement (August 22, 2015)
