= Spacequake =

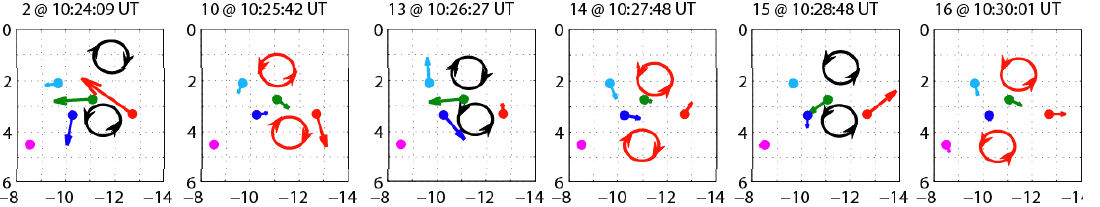
A THEMIS map of plasma flows during a spacequake. The axes are labeled in Earth radii, so each swirl is about the size of Earth.

In astrophysics, a spacequake is a temblor in the Earth's magnetic field. Though occurring in space, the effects of a spacequake can reach the surface of the Earth in the form of electromagnetic reverberations. The total energy in a spacequake can rival that of a magnitude 5 or 6 earthquake.

Spacequakes are measured using a magnetometer and displayed with a magnetogram.

The precursors for a spacequake were discovered by THEMIS in 2007, and were first reported in April 2010 in a publication in the Geophysical Research Letters.

== Cause ==
Spacequakes are caused when jets of plasma come into contact with the geomagnetic field some 30,000 km above Earth's equator. The impact sets off a rebounding process, in which the incoming plasma actually bounces up and down on the reverberating magnetic field until they dissipate in a process called repetitive flow rebuffing.

When the plasma jets hit the inner magnetosphere, vortices with opposite sense of rotation appear and reappear on either side of the plasma jet.

== Effect ==
When acting together, vortices and spacequakes could have a noticeable effect on Earth in the form of electromagnetic interference. The tails of vortices may funnel particles into Earth's atmosphere, sparking auroras and making waves of ionization that disturb radio communications and GPS. By tugging on surface magnetic fields, spacequakes generate currents in the very ground we walk on creating ground current surges.

== See also ==
- Earthquake
- Starquake
