= Misuzu Togashi =

Japanese actress

- 富樫 美鈴
- Born: August 7 Hokkaido, Japan
- Occupations: Actress; voice actress; singer
- Years active: 2009–present
- Agent: Ken Production

Misuzu Togashi (富樫 美鈴, Togashi Misuzu; born August 7) is a Japanese actress, voice-actress, and singer affiliated with Ken Production. She is known for Minakami Mai in Nichijou, Yukiteru Amano in Future Diary, and Tobiichi Origami in the Date A Live-series.

== Filmography ==
=== Anime ===
Year	Title	Role	Other notes
2009	Student Council's Discretion	Minatsu Shiina	Main role
2011–14	Maken-ki!	Azuki Shinatsu	
2011	Nichijou	Mai Minakami	Main role
2011	Future Diary	Yukiteru Amano	Main role
2012	Kuromajo-san ga Toru!!	Naoki Kojima	
2012	Upotte!!	Ichiroku	Main role
2012	Student Council's Discretion Lv. 2	Minatsu Shiina	Main role
2013–24	Date A Live	Origami Tobiichi	Main role
2014	Oneechan ga Kita	Takayoshi Hayasaka	
2014	Mekakucity Actors	Hibiya Amamiya	Main role
2015	Haikyū!! Second Season	Kaori Suzumeda	
2021	Yashahime	Raita	
2021	Shaman King	Redseb	

=== OVA / Short film ===
Year	Title	Role	Note
2011	Nichijou Episode 0	Mai Minakami	OVA
2012	Future Diary: Redial	Yukiteru Amano	OVA
2013	Date to Date	Origami Tobiichi	OVA
2014	Kurumi Star Festival	Origami Tobiichi	OVA
2016	Kagerou Daze -in a day's-	Hibiya Amamiya	Short film

=== Video games ===
- Sid Story (Christie)
- Alchemist Code (Reida)
- Lost Judgment (Mami Koda)
- The Last of Us Part II (Lev)

=== Dubbing ===
- Bohemian Rhapsody, Roger's Girlfriend 1
- iCarly
- The Thundermans, Billy Thunderman
