= Saeko Zōgō =

- 藏合 紗恵子
- Born: August 13, 1984 (age 42); Tsuyama, Okayama Prefecture, Japan
- Occupations: Actor; voice actress; singer
- Years active: 2014–present
- Agent: Production Ace
- Height: 164 cm (5 ft 5 in)
- Musical career
- Genres: J-Pop; Anison
- Instrument: Vocals
- Label: Nippon Columbia
- Member of: Two-Formula (with Kaori Sadohara)

Saeko Zōgō (藏合 紗恵子, Zōgō Saeko; born August 13, 1984) is a Japanese actress, voice actress and singer from Tsuyama, Okayama Prefecture, Japan. She is affiliated with Production Ace. Her major roles are: Ichiyon (M14) in Upotte!!, Nadeshiko Sōma in Isuca, Freon Flamel in Sky Wizards Academy, Sōji Okita in Dai-Shogun – Great Revolution, and Shiori Itsuka in Date A Live II. She and fellow voice actress Kaori Sadohara were part of a duo called Two-Formula who sang songs on Isuca and Noucome. She announced her marriage on May 21, 2017.

== Filmography ==
=== Anime ===
Year	Title	Role	Notes	Source
2009	Heaven's Lost Property	Various Characters		
2010	Omamori Himari	Child		
2010	Giant Killing	Yoshio Fukazawa		
2010	Heaven's Lost Property Forte	Maeko Asaka		
2011	Sekai-ichi Hatsukoi	Various Characters	Also Season 2	
2011	Deadman Wonderland	Harumi		
2011	R-15	Shimon Tegakari		
2011–2014	Maken-ki! series	Chacha Akaza		
2012	Upotte!!	Ichiyon (M14)	Also OVA	
2012	Jigoku Youchien	Kerubero-kun	Crowdsourced web-shorts project	
2013	Problem Children Are Coming from Another World, Aren't They?	Caroro Gandack, Algor		
2013	Blood Lad	Sakurako		
2013	Fate/kaleid liner Prisma Illya	Child		
2013	BlazBlue Alter Memory	Gii		
2013	My Mental Choices are Completely Interfering with my School Romantic Comedy	Class Rep		
2014	Dai-Shogun – Great Revolution	Okita Sōji		
2014	Chaika – The Coffin Princess series	Chaika Bohdan	Two seasons	
2014	Date A Live II	Shiori Itsuka		
2014	Love Stage!!	Gagarull ガガルル		
2014	Tokyo ESP	Rū Ryūshi		
2014	Amagi Brilliant Park	Chiba Mama チバママ		
2015	The Testament of Sister New Devil	Shiho Aikawa	Also Burst	
2015	Isuca	Nadeshiko Sōma		
2015	Triage X	Siren サイレン		
2015	Sky Wizards Academy	Freon Flamel		
2016	Qualidea Code	Student		
2017	Idol Jihen	Konatsu Sanjō		

=== Video games ===
Year	Title	Role	Notes	Source
2015	Fallout 4	Cait	PS4, Xbox One	
2017	For Honor	Kensei	PC, PS4, Xbox One	

- Granado Espada (Adelina Esperanza)

=== Dubbing ===
==== Live-action ====
- American Graffiti (Budda)
- Blue Crush 2 (The Roxy Rep)
- District 9 (Phyllis Sinderson)
- Marley & Me: The Puppy Years (Axel)
- The New Daughter (Pam)
- Red Lights (Rina)
- Ruby Sparks (Mabel)
- Saw 3D (Joan, Kara)
- Scream 4 (Jenny Randall)
- Taken (Ingrid)
- Titanic (Dorothy Gibson)
- The Ward (Tammy)

==== Animation ====
- Sofia the First (James)
- Steven Universe (Sapphire)

== Discography ==
=== Singles ===
- "Reach for Light" (Nippon Columbia, February 12, 2014) – Reached number 111 at Oricon.
- "Upon a Star" (Nippon Columbia, June 4, 2014)
- "Triage" – Saeko Zogo Feat. Nagareda Project (Nippon Columbia, April 29, 2015) – Reached number 92 at Oricon.

==== As Two-Formula ====
- "Somebody to Love" (5pb records, January 28, 2015) – ending theme song from Isuca. Reached number 135 at Oricon.
- "Taiyou to Tsuki no CROSS" (太陽と月のCROSS) (5pb records, November 27, 2013) – theme song from Noucome. Reached number 83 at Oricon.
