= Problem Children Are Coming from Another World, Aren't They? =

Japanese light novel, manga, and anime series

- Cover of the first light novel volume (Korean edition), featuring Yō Kasukabe (top left), Black Rabbit and Izayoi Sakamaki (center) and Asuka Kudō (bottom right)

問題児たちが異世界から来るそうですよ? (Mondaiji-tachi ga Isekai Kara Kuru Sō Desu yo?)
- Genre: Action, isekai; Fantasy comedy
- Light novel
- Written by: Tarō Tatsunoko
- Illustrated by: Yū Amano
- Published by: Kadokawa Shoten
- Imprint: Kadokawa Sneaker Bunko
- Original run: April 1, 2011 – April 1, 2015
- Volumes: 12
- Manga
- Written by: Rio Nanamomo
- Published by: Kadokawa Shoten
- Magazine: Comp Ace
- Original run: July 26, 2012 – January 25, 2014
- Volumes: 4
- Manga

Mondaiji-tachi ga Isekai Kara Kuru Sō Desu yo? Z
- Written by: Anri Sakano
- Published by: Fujimi Shobo
- Magazine: Age Premium
- Original run: August 9, 2012 – October 9, 2013
- Volumes: 3
- Anime television series
- Directed by: Keizō Kusakawa (Chief); Yasutaka Yamamoto
- Produced by: Junichirō Tamura; Chiaki Kurakane
- Written by: Noboru Kimura
- Music by: Shirō Hamaguchi
- Studio: Diomedéa
- Licensed by: AUS: Hanabee; NA: Sentai Filmworks
- Original network: Tokyo MX, Chiba TV, tvk, Sun TV, TV Saitama, TVQ, TwellV, GBS, AT-X, MTV
- Original run: January 11, 2013 – March 15, 2013
- Episodes: 10 + OVA
- Light novel

Last Embryo
- Written by: Tarō Tatsunoko
- Illustrated by: momoco
- Published by: Kadokawa Shoten
- Imprint: Kadokawa Sneaker Bunko
- Original run: June 1, 2015 – present
- Volumes: 8

Problem Children are Coming from Another World, aren't they? (Japanese: 問題児たちが異世界から来るそうですよ?, Hepburn: Mondaiji-tachi ga Isekai Kara Kuru Sō Desu yo?), also known as Mondaiji (問題児), is a Japanese light novel series written by Tarō Tatsunoko and illustrated by Yū Amano. An anime adaptation by Diomedéa aired from January 11, 2013, to March 15, 2013. Part 1 of the series ended on April 1, 2015, with twelve volumes total with Part 2 beginning on June 1, 2015, under the new title Last Embryo (ラストエンブリオ, Rasuto Enburio) and a new illustrator, momoco.

== Plot ==
Three children, Sakamaki Izayoi, Kudō Asuka, and Kasukabe Yō, live dull lives because they possess unmatched psychic powers. One day, they receive an envelope that transports them to Little Garden, a place of supernatural powers called "Gifts." There, the residents use Gifts to play high-stakes games known as Gift Games so as to earn wealth and prestige for their communities. So, the three children join the fallen "No Name" community and resolve to help it regain its prosperity. As they learn more about Little Garden, they decide to overthrow the tyrannical Demon Lords.

== Characters ==
=== Main ===
Izayoi Sakamaki (逆廻 十六夜, Sakamaki Izayoi)
Voiced by: Shintarō Asanuma (Japanese); Jessie James Grelle (English)
An arrogant boy who often tries to solve problems with violence, yet he is also incredibly intelligent. He was bored of his old world and is currently searching for anything fun in the Little Garden. His gift is "Code: Unknown," according to the "Gift Card", a "Fragment of Laplace," which cannot figure out his ability. His natural ability is the power to negate and destroy other gifts. Izayoi is also an expert on mythology thanks to his adopted mother, and he is a genius tactician and analyst. In volume 3, it is revealed that Izayoi's adopted mother is the former strategist of the "No Names", and his powers are that he is able to destroy stars. Summoned from an unnamed year in the 2010s, his most important goal is "having fun."

Black Rabbit (黒ウサギ, Kuro Usagi)
Voiced by: Iori Nomizu (Japanese); Jessica Calvello (English)
A rabbit-eared girl who resides in the Little Garden and is the one who summoned the problem children. She often tries to be serious but easily gets flustered. When using her power, her blue hair turns pink as she gains increased power. This also happens at other times, such as when Izayoi promised his aid to her community or when enjoying a bath with the girls. One of Black Rabbit's gifts is the "Spear of Indra", a powerful legendary weapon that allows her to control lightning. She also has enormous leg strength and speed equaling Izayoi's. She is also a victim to the pervertedness of Izayoi and Shiroyasha.

Asuka Kudō (久遠 飛鳥, Kudō Asuka)
Voiced by: Sarah Emi Bridcutt (Japanese); Nancy Novotny (English)
A rich young lady who has the Gift "Authority", use her authority to command others with her words. It also has the ability to control other gifts and strengthen an object's power as long as the power of the object is weaker than the power of her gift. She owns another Gift called Dean, a massive giant Golem. Summoned from an unnamed year right after World War II, her most important goal is "understanding others."

Yō Kasukabe (春日部 耀, Kasukabe Yō)
Voiced by: Megumi Nakajima (Japanese); Brittney Karbowski (English)
A quiet young girl whose gift, which is called "Genome Tree - Non Priorum", was a pendant given to her by her father. It bestows her the ability to speak to animals and use the abilities of any animal she is able to befriend. She is often accompanied by a calico cat who is the first animal she befriends with her power, which allowed her to be able to walk again, after being crippled in a hospital. Summoned from an unnamed year in the distant future, her most important goal is "making friends."

=== Others ===
Jin Russel (ジン・ラッセル, Jin Rasseru)
Voiced by: Hiromi Igarashi (Japanese); Kalin Coates (English)
The current leader of the community "No Name". He is the oldest of the children in the community.

Shiroyasha (白夜叉)
Voiced by: Satomi Arai (Japanese); Luci Christian (English)
A senior official at Thousand Eyes, Floor Master on the East Side, Demon Lord of the White Night, spirit of the sun and white night. Her headquarters are located in 4-digit gate number #3345. She has blue-white hair, cat-like yellow eyes, and is small of stature. She dresses in a yukata and is also quite perverted. Her control of the sun allows her to create heat blasts up to 7000 degrees Celsius.

Riri (リリ)
Voiced by: Shiori Mikami (Japanese); Margaret McDonald (English)
One of the members of the community "No Name". She is a young anthropomorphic fox. It's later revealed that her mother was sent to a Gift Game and she never came back.

Leticia Draculair (レティシア・ドラクレア, Retishia Dorakurea)
Voiced by: Yuiko Tatsumi (Japanese); Carli Mosier (English)
A former member of "No Name". She was a Vampire Lord whose title was stripped upon being turned into a slave following her community's fall. She later regains her powers, but agrees to work as a maid for the community. Even as a maid she helps protect the community. Although she is usually seen her "loli form", she also has a more mature form that can be seen when she is using more advanced magic.

Sandra Dortlake (サンドラ＝ドルトレイク, Sandora Dorutoreiku)
Voiced by: Kaori Sadohara (Japanese); Cynthia Martinez (English)
One of the floor masters, she is a young girl who is a friend of Jin and Riri. She has dragonoid features and can use fire in her attacks.

Black Percher (ペスト, Pesuto)
Voiced by: Chiwa Saitō (Japanese); Hilary Haag (English)
Unofficial Demon Lord and Leader of Grim Grimoire Hamlin. She is the embodiment of the 80 million evil spirits that were created during the Black Plague. She later becomes one of Jin's summons.

== Media ==
=== Light novels ===
Part 1

No.	Title	Release date	ISBN
1	Problem Children are coming from another world, aren't they? Yes! Black Rabbit called you! (問題児たちが異世界から来るそうですよ? YES! ウサギが呼びました!)	March 31, 2011	978-4-04-474839-5
2	Problem Children are coming from another world, aren't they? Oh dear, a Declaration of War by a Demon Lord? (問題児たちが異世界から来るそうですよ? あら、魔王襲来のお知らせ?)	June 30, 2011	978-4-04-474848-7
3	Problem Children are coming from another world, aren't they? I see...Dragon Summoning (問題児たちが異世界から来るそうですよ? そう……巨龍召喚)	October 29, 2011	978-4-04-474854-8
4	Problem Children are coming from another world, aren't they? Defeat the 13th Sun (問題児たちが異世界から来るそうですよ? 十三番目の太陽を撃て)	February 29, 2012	978-4-04-100182-0
5	Problem Children are coming from another world, aren't they? Supreme Ruler of the Blue Waters Descends (問題児たちが異世界から来るそうですよ? 降臨、蒼海の覇者)	June 30, 2012	978-4-04-100357-2
6	Problem Children are coming from another world, aren't they? Flag of the Ouroboros Alliance (問題児たちが異世界から来るそうですよ? ウロボロスの連盟旗)	November 30, 2012	978-4-04-100585-9
7	Problem Children are coming from another world, aren't they? Setting Sun and Falling Moon (問題児たちが異世界から来るそうですよ? 落陽、そして墜月)	April 1, 2013	978-4-04-100759-4
8	Problem Children are coming from another world, aren't they? Tyranny of the Three Headed Dragon (問題児たちが異世界から来るそうですよ? 暴虐の三頭龍)	August 1, 2013	978-4-04-100936-9
9	Problem Children are coming from another world, aren't they? Yes! Everyday Life in Little Garden! (問題児たちが異世界から来るそうですよ? YES! 箱庭の日常ですっ!)	November 1, 2013	978-4-04-101060-0
10	Problem Children are coming from another world, aren't they? Then, Rabbit Heads Towards Purgatory (問題児たちが異世界から来るそうですよ? そして、兎は煉獄へ)	April 1, 2014	978-4-04-101295-6
11	Problem Children are coming from another world, aren't they? Strike, Faster Than Starlight! (問題児たちが異世界から来るそうですよ? 撃て、星の光より速く！)	August 1, 2014	978-4-04-102006-7
12	Problem Children are coming from another world, aren't they? It's War God's Career Consultation! (問題児たちが異世界から来るそうですよ? 軍神の進路相談です！)	April 1, 2015	978-4-04-102007-4

Part 2

No.	Title	Release date	ISBN
1	Last Embryo (1) Return of the Problem Child (ラストエンブリオ (1) 問題児の帰還)	June 1, 2015	978-4-04-103061-5
2	Last Embryo (2) Second Coming of Avatara (ラストエンブリオ 2 - 再臨のアヴァターラ)	December 1, 2015	978-4-04-103093-6
3	Last Embryo (3) Berserk, Fairy Express (ラストエンブリオ 3 - 暴走、精霊列車!)	June 1, 2016	978-4-04-103955-7
4	Last Embryo (4) King's Return (ラストエンブリオ 4 - 王の帰還)	April 1, 2017	978-4-04-104715-6
5	ラストエンブリオ 5 - 集結の時、暴走再開!	June 1, 2018	978-4-04-105519-9
6	ラストエンブリオ 6 - 激闘!! アトランティス大陸	December 1, 2018	978-4-04-107678-1
7	ラストエンブリオ 7 - 吼えよ英傑、甦れ神の雷霆！	June 1, 2019	978-4-04-107679-8
8	ラストエンブリオ 8 - 追想の問題児	July 1, 2020	978-4-04-108727-5

=== Manga ===
Mondaiji-tach ga isekai kara kuru sou desu yo? is a manga series that began serialization in Comp Ace with Nanamomo Rio as the illustrator. Covering volumes 1 and 2 of the light novel, it ran alongside the anime, though outlasting it as the eighteen chapters were released once a month. The manga is more faithful to the light novel and has scenes the anime does not.

Volume	Japanese release date	ISBN
1	December 6, 2012	978-4-04-120524-2
2	March 7, 2013	978-4-04-120632-4
3	August 21, 2013	978-4-04-120833-5
4	February 26, 2014	978-4-04-120947-9

Mondaiji-tachi ga isekai kara kuru sou desu yo? Z is a spin-off manga written and illustrated by Anri Sakano. It ran in Age Premium during the run of the anime and after it. Volumes 1 and 2 take place after the events of volume 2 of the light novel, and by extension the anime, while volume 3 takes place after volume 5.

Volume	Japanese release date	ISBN
1	January 7, 2013	978-4-04-712848-4
2	May 9, 2013	978-4-04-120632-4
3	January 9, 2014	978-4-04-712993-1

=== Anime ===
An anime television adaptation produced by Diomedéa aired on Tokyo MX from January 11, 2013, to March 15, 2013, and later on other stations. The series was simulcast by Crunchyroll and Anime on Demand. The opening theme is "Black † White" by Iori Nomizu whilst the ending theme is "To Be Continued?" by Kaori Sadohara. In 2015, it aired on Anime Network On Demand on DIRECTV with English subtitles.

No.	Title	End Card	Original release date
1	"Problem Children are Coming from Another World, Aren't They?"; Transliteration: "Mondaiji-tachi ga Hakoniwa ni Yattekita yō desu yo?" (Japanese: 問題児たちが箱庭にやって来たようですよ？)	Noizi Ito	January 12, 2013
Choosing to leave behind everything in pursuit of their personal goals, human teenagers Izayoi Sakamaki, Asuka Kudō and Yō Kasukabe are transported to an alternate reality "The Little Garden", where different races with different powers, or "Gifts" reside. There, they meet Black Rabbit, a kemonomimi girl with rabbit ears, making her a Judge Master that enforces rules and order due to being servants of The Little Garden's creator. She explains the place's logic to them: The Little Garden revolves around 'Gift Games' that challenge players with games of varying danger while betting something in exchange for rewards if they win, with the rules written on Geass Scrolls that are absolute and unchanging. Black Rabbit also invites them into her own community of players. Making their way to a rural village in the East, Black Rabbit leaves Asuka and Yō with her community's leader Jin after noticing that Izayoi separated from them in search of fun. As the rest wait for Black Rabbit and Izayoi's return over some drinks, they are approached by a mysterious man.
2	"Seems Like a Crazy Loli Clad in Japanese Clothing?"; Transliteration: "Wasō Rori wa Iroiro Buttonda Okata no yō desu yo?" (Japanese: 和装ロリはいろいろブっ飛んだお方のようですよ？)	mebae	January 19, 2013
Asuka, Yō and Jin are confronted by Galdo Gaspar, a beast man who is also the leader of a community named "Forres Garo" and invites the girls to join his community along with Black Rabbit. To convince them, he makes fun of how Jin's community was forced to become a "No-Name" after losing an undeniable challenge from the tyrannical Demon Lords of The Little Garden, resulting in the community losing their formal name and banner. This has left the remaining members to be Jin, Black Rabbit and around one hundred and twenty children with ages 10 and below, making winning their banner and name back difficult. At the same time, Black Rabbit, finding Izayoi after he defeats a water god, explains their situation to him in hopes the three can help. Izayoi, liking the idea to fight stronger opponents, agrees. Asuka, suspicious of Galdo's claim that his community has won all Gift Games that involve staking their banner, uses her Gift to command him to reveal how. It turns out that Galdo had kidnapped women and children from other communities to subdue and blackmail them into doing their bidding, however breaking his promises and killing them all off eventually. Infuriated, the girls challenge him to a Gift Game the next day. After Izayoi and Black Rabbit reunite with the others, the group visits Shiroyasha, a Demon Lord from the "Thousand Eyes" -- an extremely large trade community -- to appraise the children's Gifts. Unlike others of her kind, Shiroyasha has chosen to use her strength for peace, becoming the Floor Master, or guardian of the East Side of The Little Garden. They decide to challenge her to a Gift Game that Yō wins by befriending a griffin and overcoming its trial, using her Gift of taking the powers of other animals she had befriended to ultimately save herself. From Shiroyasha, the three learn that they come from different times on Earth and earn Gift Cards that can store their Gifts and list their names, with Izayoi's stating "Unknown".
3	"Sounds Like We're Doing All Sorts of Stuff in the Bath Together?"; Transliteration: "Ofuro de Anna Koto ya Konna Koto da sō desu yo?" (Japanese: お風呂であんなコトやこんなコトだそうですよ？)	Ruroo	January 26, 2013
By beating the water god, Izayoi receives an endless water supply from a water tree that he lets the No-Names use. The girls use this water to bathe together, after which Asuka borrows a dress from Black Rabbit that gives its wearer an additional aura of protection. That same night, Galdo's subordinates infiltrate the No-Names' territory but are found out by Izayoi, revealing that all the hostages have already been killed and claiming that Jin can defeat all the Demon Lords. Although the latter disagrees with the idea, Izayoi reasons that although the Demon Lords and other communities would attack them, the plan would gain them fame and communities who would be against the Demon Lords. When he speaks ill of some of their former members that were disloyal to No-Name, Jin tells Izayoi that a former Demon Lord and comrade is now being wagered as a prize for a soon-to-be-held Gift Game. Izayoi promises to save that comrade if Asuka, Yō and Jin can win the Gift Game tomorrow. The next day, all of them are brought to Galdo's residence, which has been newly revamped with a tangling creeper forest and beastification magic. The rules however, handicap the three to be unable to use their Gifts, forcing them to defeat Galdo instead using a designated weapon. After being confronted by Galdo, who has turned into a demon tiger despite originally being a tiger that can assume human form, Jin deduces from the surrounding magic to be of vampiric and demon nature, suspecting the involvement of another party involved. Recognising their designated weapon to be a cross-sword speared in the wall, Yō distracts Galdo as Asuka orders Jin to run away alone first, however inadvertently carting herself off with him. When Yō returns injured and collapses, Asuka returns to the residence, sets the place on fire and lures him out to the forest. Recalling how Black Rabbit had tutored her to use her Gift in controlling others' Gifts as well, she uses the creepers in restraining Galdo, commands the sword to give her its power, and kills him, winning the game. This causes all of his slaves to be freed before Jin's vow to take down the Demon Lords, angering the vampire who cast the curse on Galdo. Bringing Yō back to their territory, an unnamed man with black and blonde hair arrives at Shiroyasha's place.
4	"It Seems Some Pervert is After Black Rabbit?"; Transliteration: "Kuro Usagi ga Eroiyarashii Yatsu ni Nerawareta yō desu yo?" (Japanese: 黒ウサギがエロイヤらしい奴に狙われたようですよ？)	Fujima Takuya	February 2, 2013
While Yō continues to recover, Black Rabbit discusses with Izayoi about their next step to rescue Leticia Draculair, a pure-blood vampire who was the former Demon Lord and comrade Jin previously talked about. However, their conversation is interrupted by the vampire who assisted Galdo when Black Rabbit goes to make tea, who is none other than Leticia herself. She apologizes for causing them trouble as she only wished to know the extent of the children's powers but concludes that their Gifts are too unrefined to manage the community and wants Black Rabbit to disband it as the Gift Game wagering her had been cancelled. Leticia's owner, the blonde-haired-black-haired man at Shiroyasha's place named Luios Perseus, decides to attack the No-Names using a Gorgon that can turn people to stone when his by its rays, much to the latter's chagrin. Leticia sacrifices herself to protect Asuka after Black Rabbit discovers she had lost all her divinity and become an ordinary vampire instead during a Gift Game with Izayoi. Members of Luios's community, Perseus, are sent to retrieve her and Izayoi stops Black Rabbit from attacking them, choosing to speak with Luios instead at Shiroyasha's. Instead of betting Black Rabbit on the line, they choose to challenge Perseus to a duel after Izayoi earns titles from winning against legendary monsters like the Kraken and Graeae, giving them the right to challenge any community to a Gift Game despite being a No-Name.
5	"The Oath Seems to be Beyond the Stars?"; Transliteration: "Chikai wa Hoshi no Kanata ni da sō desu yo?" (Japanese: 誓いは星の彼方にだそうですよ？)	Thores Shibamoto	February 9, 2013
The Gift Game involves invading Luios' fortress and only those who can reach him without being detected win, lest they lose their rights to challenge him. However, the guards all have invisibility Gifts from Hades Helm replica helmets, with Luios himself holding Leticia's Gifts. With those rules in mind, Izayoi comes with a plan of having Asuka distract most of the guards using the water tree while Yō gives way to him and Jin as they sneak past them. Yō helps Izayoi and Jin obtain one of the replicas and steal the real Hades Helm using echolocation. Instead of confronting them, Luios unleashes his trump card, Algol the Gorgon, a former Demon Lord under his control, turning all outside the colosseum into stone and attacks Izayoi, who easily overpowered it with his strength and defeats it by destroying its Gift with his Unknown ability. Although Luios admits defeat and relinquishes Leticia, Izayoi gives him a chance to fight back in a fist fight, raising the stakes of the game where Perseus has to wager their banner when they lose. He exiles Luios from being a part of the Thousand Eyes league, taking down their banner, the Perseus constellation from the night sky. Leticia returns to the No-Name community as a maid as gratitude for saving her. As they celebrate together, Izayoi vows to put their banner in the sky as well. Their celebration is interrupted by a letter from an unknown sender.
6	"Looks Like the Problem Children are Participating in a Festival?"; Transliteration: "Mondaijii-tachi ga Omatsurisawagi ni Sanka suru yō desu yo?" (Japanese: 問題児たちがお祭り騒ぎに参加するようですよ？)	Yukiwo	February 16, 2013
Asuka remembers her days of confinement in a mundane boarding school where no one could defy her, prompting her to choose to enter The Little Garden. Waking up, they find a letter that Black Rabbit has been trying to keep a secret: an invitation to the Nativity of the Salamander Festival at Salamandra, located in the North-east district of the Northern region in celebration of the coronation of their new leader 11-year-old Sandra Dortlake, who is also a friend of Jin. Finding out that there will be Gift Games involved, despite the high travelling costs Yō, Asuka and Izayoi run away to the festival with Jin and a little fox girl named Lili, leaving a note behind to Black Rabbit threatening to leave the community should she not catch them in a day. Seeking Shiroyasha's help in getting to Salamandra, Yō is caught by Black Rabbit as Izayoi and Asuka escape to the festival grounds as a chase ensues. Black Rabbit is challenged to a game where the winning party can order the loser to do any one thing of their choice. After Izayoi brings down a building that leads the game to a draw, military policemen of Salamandra, led by Sandra's brother Mandra, arrive to confront them. Meanwhile, Asuka espies a lost faerie and decides to chase it, with Leticia following her closely.
7	"Someone Might Get All Kissy with Asuka in the Dark?"; Transliteration: "Kurayami de Asuka ga chūchū sa re chau sōdesu yo" (Japanese: 暗闇で飛鳥がチューチューされちゃうそうですよ？)	Yūgen	February 23, 2013
While with Shiroyasha, Yō is invited to participate in a Gift Game tournament known as Battle of the Creators, passing the preliminaries to advance to the finals. Since no one got hurt during the game between Black Rabbit and Izayoi, Sandra decides to let them go unpunished, to Mandra's disappointment in his hatred for the No-Names. As an additional punishment, Shiroyasha requests that they protect Sandra by slaying the Demon Lord mentioned in the prophecy of the Laplace's demon. Meanwhile, Asuka gets on good terms with the faerie from a community called "Rattenfänger", going to an art exhibit where she is amazed by an armour made by the community themselves. However, she is attacked by rats that she cannot controlled, having to be saved by Leticia instead. Since her Gift of authority doesn't work on someone stronger than her, Asuka figures that someone is manipulating the rats and tries to become stronger, growing jealous of Izayoi and Yō's physical prowess. During a meeting, Shiroyasha lets Black Rabbit judge the Battle of Creators the following day. Upon announcement of the remaining participants' communities, Asuka is surprised to see Rattenfänger in the list beside No-Name, Salamandra, and Will-o'-the-wisp. Shiroyasha explains that the Rattenfänger, the one who manipulates rats, is related to a community called the "Pied Piper of Hamelin" who once worked under a Demon Lord that summoned 200 demons and led a community called "Grimm Grimoire" which got disbanded after losing in a Gift Game. Jin further explained the relation of the Pied Piper to the Rattenfänger, detailing its history as being the same person since Rattenfänger is just a German word for Pied Piper. After figuring out its roots, everyone concludes that with the assistance of Rattenfänger, the Demon Lord of Grimm Grimoire will attack at the Nativity of the Salamander. As they dismiss their meeting, Shiroyasha cautions everyone to be on their guard for any spy from Rattenfänger and protect Sandra, making Asuka doubt the identity of the little faerie with her.
8	"It Seems That a Great Disaster Will Come With the Playing of a Flute?"; Transliteration: "Kuroi kyōji wa fue no oto to tomoni kuru sōdesu yo?" (Japanese: 黒い凶事は笛の音と共に来るそうですよ？)	BUNBUN	March 2, 2013
The Battle of the Creators begins where Yō is pitted against Asha Ignis-Fatuus from the Will-o'-the-wisp community and their greatest Gift, Jack-o'-lantern, much to Asuka's delight of seeing him for the first time. Faced with an immortal demon, Yō surrenders although she could ask someone for help from her community, not wanting to rely on others. Just then, black Geass rolls start falling from the sky, inviting everyone to join a game. The aim of the game forces players to "break the false lore and expose the true legend", as well as forming a barrier around Shiroyasha that hinders her participation in the game. Above the arena are the members of the community "the Pied Piper of Hamelin". Izayoi, hoping to find their leader, randomly picks an opponent and ends up fighting Weser, the embodiment of the Weser River from the fairytale. Leticia and Sandra also battle against Pest, a Demon Lord of "The Black Plague" in the story as Asuka, Yō, and Jin try to figure out the cause of Shiroyasha's inability to join the game. Ratten, the embodiment of the rats from the story and the one who attacked Asuka in the art exhibit, gains control over the citizens of Salamandra using her flute. Asuka makes Jin and Yō run away, wanting to beat Ratten, but loses and is lost.
9	"It Seems That the Smell of Death That Brings About Disaster Is Growing Throughout the Town?"; Transliteration: "Saika o motarasu shi no kaori ga machi ni habikoru yōdesu yo?" (Japanese: 災禍をもたらす死の香りが街にはびこるようですよ？)	Shirabi	March 9, 2013
As chaos reigns over Salamandra, Black Rabbit uses her authority as Judge Master to put the game on hold and ask both parties to have a meeting. The No-Names try to confirm the details of the game from Pest, who is also the community leader and the game's host, but the rules are confirmed to be just and being followed due to the lack of details. While trying to find a schedule to resume the game, Pest reveals that she is spreading pathogens throughout the city to make people ill, threatening the No-Names to join their community Grim Grimoire of Hamelin if they want to live. Deducing that this is a new community wanting more manpower, Izayoi bends the rules to allow Black Rabbit to participate in the game as well, postponing the game to a week's time. Meanwhile, Asuka is being held captive in a dark cave along with the little faerie. When she regains consciousness, the lost souls of the 130 children that died in the story of the Pied Piper of Hamelin appear asking Asuka to help them end the false lore of the Rattenfänger in exchange for their armour, Dean, if she can make it submit to her in a game. After 4 days, Yō and the citizens of Salamandra are feeling the symptoms of the Black Plague. Izayoi visits Yō in her room to help her alleviate her boredom, trying to find out the truth behind the fairytale. Due to them all being summoned from different timelines, many things happened differently but there would be some unchanged, although there would still be the question of whether the Pied Piper of Hamelin, they are facing is the same story they know as the Black Plague is unable to kill the children in the story in a limited time which creates a contradiction. Remembering that the Black Plague occurred in the 14th century after the "Little Ice Age" due to the weakening of the Sun, and that Shiroyasha has control over the Sun's activity, he realises that the prerequisite for the game will not be met if she joins the game since the Black Plague which is a necessary part of the game, will not be able to occur when the Sun is active. Izayoi also recalls the stained glasses depicting the Pied Piper of Hamelin scattered across the town in the story. Following the riddle, they should break all the stained glass except for the one that depicts the true legend behind the Pied Piper. At the day of the game, Izayoi and the others scatter around Salamandra, breaking stained glasses of the false lore. The Grim Grimoire of Hamelin summons the village of Hamelin in a panic, changing the locations of the stained glasses and doubling their powers. Weser, with his divinity activated, tries to take on Izayoi. Black Rabbit and Sandra fight hand in hand against Pest while Jin and the others fight against Ratten and the Stroms, her ceramic monsters. Just then, Asuka saves them with Deen at her command.
10	"It Seems That the Problem Children Prove Who's on Top?"; Transliteration: "Mondaiji-tachi ga shirokuro hakkiri sa seru yōdesu yo?" (Japanese: 問題児たちが白黒はっきりさせるようですよ？)	Yū Amano	March 15, 2013
Izayoi continues to fight against Weser, the real Pied Piper of Hamelin, revealing that the Pied Piper of Hamelin appeared during the time the Black Plague was getting weak and that the others "were added later, [and were] modelled after Black Plague.", ultimately provoking Weser to fight and be defeated. Meanwhile, using Dean, Asuka battles against the Ratten's Stroms and wins despite allowing her to play one additional song to control Dean. To buy time, Pest tells Sandra and Black Rabbit of her identity as the embodiment of the resentment and revengeful desire of the 80 million people that died from the Black Plague, wanting to have revenge on the Sun, and hence Shiroyasha. Sensing her two comrades' death, her patience snaps, spreading a dark red wind of plague that kills anyone it touches. To stopper the never-ending flow of sickness, Black Rabbit transports the fighters to the Moon Palace, the Chandra Mahal, weakening Pest's power. Asuka commands the full potential of the Spear of Indra that Black Rabbit lent her to defeat Pest, thereby ending the game. After the battle, Asuka meets with the children, who tell Asuka of another interpretation of the Pied Piper of Hamelin. In the story, the 130 children left their parents' homes to follow the Pied Piper to a city where they would build their own community, the Rattënfanger. Deciding to return to their time, they leave her in-charge of Dean and their 131st member, the little faerie that Asuka names Merun. In the Salamandra Palace, Izayoi confirms his claims to Mandra that Salamandra had invited the Demon Lord Pest to the festival, staging her defeat which can concrete Sandra's claim to her position as Salamandra spreads the news of their victory against the Demon Lord. With no excuse for the actions, Mandra lets Izayoi take his life in exchange that Sandra is kept unknowing, but Izayoi tells him that he would rather want Salamandra to be the first to aid them in their time of need instead. At the No-Name community, everyone attempts to re-fertilize their land with the help of Merun and Dean. In the midst of happy toil, a letter floats down before Izayoi with a mysterious seal on top.
OVA	"Problem Children are Coming from Another World, Aren't They? ~The Hot Spring Fun Trip~"; Transliteration: "Mondaiji-tachi ga Isekai kara Kuru Sou Desu yo? Onsen Manyūki" (Japanese: 問題児たちが異世界から来るそうですよ? ~温泉遊記~)	TBA	July 20, 2013
The [No Name]s are invited to participate in a Gift Game to locate a water source for a community. The catch: Everyone must wear swimsuits!
