= Isuka =

Isuka can refer to:

- Common crossbill, a bird (Japanese name)
- Guilty Gear Isuka, a computer game
- Isuca, a manga series by Osamu Takahashi
- Isuka, a character in the anime series Noein.
