= Sky Wizards Academy =

Japanese light novel series and anime

- First light novel volume cover

空戦魔導士候補生の教官 (Kūsen Madōshi Kōhosei no Kyōkan)
- Genre: Science fantasy, magic, harem
- Light novel
- Written by: Yū Moroboshi
- Illustrated by: Mikihiro Amami
- Published by: Fujimi Shobo
- Imprint: Fujimi Fantasia Bunko
- Original run: July 20, 2013 – July 20, 2017
- Volumes: 14
- Manga
- Illustrated by: Arisu Shidō
- Published by: Media Factory
- Magazine: Monthly Comic Alive
- Original run: July 26, 2014 – July 27, 2016
- Volumes: 4
- Anime television series
- Directed by: Takayuki Inagaki
- Produced by: Yasuda Takeshi
- Written by: Hiroshi Yamaguchi
- Music by: Flying Dog; Masakazu Sato
- Studio: Diomedéa
- Licensed by: AUS: Madman Entertainment; NA: Funimation
- Original network: Tokyo MX, Sun TV, TVQ, Chiba TV, tvk, TV Saitama, Gifu TV, Mie TV, BS11
- English network: US: Funimation
- Original run: July 8, 2015 – September 23, 2015
- Episodes: 12
- Original video animation
- Directed by: Takayuki Inagaki
- Written by: Hiroshi Yamaguchi
- Music by: Flying Dog; Masakazu Sato
- Studio: Diomedéa
- Released: March 9, 2016
- Runtime: 24 minutes

Sky Wizards Academy (Japanese: 空戦魔導士候補生の教官, Hepburn: Kūsen Madōshi Kōhosei no Kyōkan; lit. "The Instructor of the Aerial Combat Wizard Trainees") is a Japanese light novel series written by Yū Moroboshi and illustrated by Mikihiro Amami. Fujimi Shobo has published fourteen volumes since July 2013 under their Fujimi Fantasia Bunko imprint. A manga adaptation with art by Arisu Shidō started serialization in Media Factory's seinen manga magazine Monthly Comic Alive from July 26, 2014. A 12-episode anime television series adaptation by Diomedéa aired between July 8, 2015, and September 23, 2015.

== Plot ==
Humanity was driven off the land by the threat of magical armored insects and now live in aerial floating cities. Its defenses lie in wizards who fight the insects with magic in mid-air. Kanata Age is a young man who lives on the floating wizard academy city of "Misutogan." He was once celebrated as the "Black Master Swordsman", the elite ace of the S128 special team. However, he is now despised as the "traitor of the special team." One day, he is assigned as the instructor of E601, a team that has suffered over 100 consecutive defeats. E601 has three girls – Misora Whitale, Lecty Eisenach, and Rico Flamel – with one or two peculiar quirks.

== Characters ==
=== Main characters ===
Kanata Age (カナタ・エイジ, Kanata Eiji)
Voiced by: Yoshitsugu Matsuoka (Japanese); Joel McDonald (English)
Formerly known as the ace of Platoon S128 and the strongest Sky Wizard, after a very dangerous mission that he completed successfully, he stopped going on missions, and now he's loathed as a traitor. He becomes the instructor of Platoon E601, hoping to improve their capabilities. He tends to be in situations where the girls label him as a pervert but is able to overcome the hurdles thrown at him.
Misora Whitale (ミソラ・ホイットテール, Misora Hoittotēru)
Voiced by: Nozomi Yamamoto (Japanese); Tia Ballard (English)
The leader of Platoon E601. Despite having good speed and stamina, she's rather impulsive and not very good with her weapon or giving orders. When Kanata finds out her desire of being a Sword Sorcerer as a way of honoring her late mother, he decides to train her in order to make her improve. It is shown that she holds feelings for Kanata and usually gets jealous when he acts kindly towards Yuri.
Lecty Eisenach (レクティ・アイゼナッハ, Rekuti Aizenahha)
Voiced by: Nao Tōyama (Japanese); Megan Shipman (English)
Member of Platoon E601 with the role of close combat fighter. Despite being skilled with her weapon, she's incredibly shy and prone to apologizing a lot for no reason. In order to help her, Kanata makes her work at a maid cafe so she can talk to other people. She also has feelings for Kanata as he made her improve her lack of social skills and confidence.
Rico Flamel (リコ・フラメル, Riko Furameru)
Voiced by: Iori Nomizu (Japanese); Dawn M. Bennett (English)
Member of Platoon E601 with the role of sniper. While intelligent and good at shooting, she's narcissistic to the point of seeing herself as a goddess, not even bothering to practice. It turns out that a lot of her narcissism comes from feeling inferior towards her older sister, but Kanata helps her recover her will to fight. She has feelings for Kanata as well as he accepts her for who she really is.
Yuri Flostre (ユーリ・フロストル, Yūri Furosutoru)
Voiced by: Risa Taneda (Japanese); Jad Saxton (English)
Member of Platoon S128, who used to idolize Kanata, but since she was unconscious when he charged alone, she now sees him as a traitor like most of the academy. Whenever she sees him she always picks a fight with him however it is quite clear she is just trying to get his attention. Despite calling him a traitor, she still has feelings for him. After losing a bet against Kanata in the Mistgun tournament she joins Fireteam E601 with the rest of the girls.
Chloe Sevegny (クロエ・セヴェニー, Kuroe Sevenī)
Voiced by: Yūki Yamada (Japanese); Megan Emerick (English)
Guard Captain of Platoon S128 and Kanata's childhood friend. She still defends Kanata's actions and later recommended him to be the instructor of Platoon E601.
Lloyd Alwin (ロイド・オールウィン, Roido Ōruwin)
Voiced by: Tetsuya Kakihara (Japanese); Ricco Fajardo (English)
Another member of Platoon S128. Like Chloe, he doesn't see Kanata as a traitor. Kanata seems to be quite good friends with him as they can be seen chatting quite often.
Freon Flamel (フロン・フラメル, Furon Furameru)
Voiced by: Saeko Zōgō (Japanese); Alex Moore (English)
Rico's older sister and supervisor of the Sky Wizard Platoons. Despite disliking her sister's attitude, she occasionally asks Chloe about her progress. But seeing Kanate the "traitor", training Platoon E601 for the Mistgun tournament, she's arrogantly adamant in getting rid of Kanate and his platoon. Includes asking Yuri to try to get her team to win.

=== Other characters ===
Real Nua (レアル・ヌア, Rearu Nua)
Voiced by: Hiroki Yasumoto (Japanese); Chris Guerrero (English)
A member of the medical division who develops a crush on Yuri although his crush is what leads to his decision to gain power through nefarious ways and succumbing to possession by the sky beetles; he almost destroyed the academy. He is the main antagonist in the anime.
Amy (エイミー, Eimī)
Voiced by: Chika Anzai (Japanese); Lynsey Hale (English)
Beach (ビーチ, Bīchi)
Voiced by: Yuko Hara (Japanese); Kristen McGuire (English)
Shiela (シーラ, Shīra)
Voiced by: Nichika Ōmori (Japanese); Michelle Rojas (English)
Christina Balcuhorn (クリスティーナ・バルクホルン, Kurisutīna Barukuhorun)
Voiced by: Ibuki Kido (Japanese); Sarah Wiedenheft (English)
Lily Lancaster (リリィ・ランカスター, Rirī Rankasuta)
Voiced by: Mari Misaki (Japanese); Bryn Apprill (English)
Sasha Nielsen (サーシャ·ニールセン, Sāsha Nīrusen)
Voiced by: Mami Kamikura (Japanese); Alexis Tipton (English)
Greg Hastuck
Voiced by: Yukiko Yao (Japanese); Ryan Reynolds (English)
Socie Whitale
Voiced by: Rina Satō (Japanese); Morgan Lauré Garrett (English)
Misora's late mother and Sky Wizard. While she was an excellent fighter, she was rather silly and clumsy at home, much to the annoyance of her husband and daughter. When she was killed in action by the Armored Insects, everyone she knew except Misora forgot about her.
Gail Whitale
Voiced by: Jiro Saito (Japanese); Jeremy Inman (English)
Misora's widowed father, who is a Normal and owner of a restaurant. He forgot about his wife when she was killed by the Insects and now he worries that if Misora dies, he will also forget her.

== Media ==
=== Light novels ===
The first light novel volume was published by Fujimi Shobo under their Fujimi Fantasia Bunko imprint on July 20, 2013. As of July 2017, fourteen volumes have been published.

No.	Release date	ISBN
1	July 20, 2013	978-4-04-071020-4
2	November 20, 2013	978-4-04-712957-3
3	March 20, 2014	978-4-04-070071-7
4	July 19, 2014	978-4-04-070130-1
5	November 20, 2014	978-4-04-070383-1
6	March 20, 2015	978-4-04-070384-8
7	July 18, 2015	978-4-04-070430-2
8	October 25, 2015	978-4-04-070431-9
9	March 9, 2016 (Blu-ray Limited Edition)	978-4-04-070689-4
9	March 19, 2016	978-4-04-070703-7
10	July 20, 2016	978-4-04-070966-6
11	November 19, 2016	978-4-04-070967-3
12	March 18, 2017	978-4-04-070968-0
13	July 20, 2017	978-4-04-072380-8
14	July 20, 2017	978-4-04-072381-5

=== Anime ===
A 12-episode anime television series adaptation by Diomedéa aired between July 8, 2015, and September 23, 2015. Two pieces of theme music are used. The opening theme, titled "D.O.B.", is performed by Iori Nomizu. The ending theme is "Hallelujah" performed by La La Larks.

==== Episode list ====
No.	Title	Original air date
1	"Fireteam E601"; Transliteration: "E 601 shōtai" (Japanese: E601小隊)	July 8, 2015
Former elite Sky Wizard Kanata, the "Traitor" is assigned as the new instructor of Fireteam E601. Unknowingly, the three girls mistakes Kanata as a pervert until they realize who he really is.
2	"The Strongest Traitor"; Transliteration: "Saikyō no uragirimono" (Japanese: 最強の裏切り者)	July 15, 2015
Fireteam E601's first training session under instructor "Traitor" Kanata begins. Kanata quickly notices that each Sky Wizard has her own strengths. However, their overwhelming weaknesses are much more pronounced and doesn't work together as a team.
3	"The Potentials of the Weakest"; Transliteration: "Saijaku ga motarasu kanōsei" (Japanese: 最弱がもたらす可能性)	July 22, 2015
Kanata is armed with knowledge of each of his students. He assigns special training exercises to Lecty and Misora while Rico decides to sit out. Lecty is assign to maid service at a café while Misora has to find Rico's weakness.
4	"The Unforgettable Past"; Transliteration: "Wasurezaru kako" (Japanese: 忘れざる過去)	July 29, 2015
Kanata obviously determines that Misora have no chance of success with her current weapon known as the Magic Cannon Sword. But understanding her history through her dad helps him know how to get Misora to honor her late deceased mother.
5	"The Key to Victory"; Transliteration: "Shōri no kagi wa" (Japanese: 勝利の鍵は)	August 5, 2015
Kanata is able to train Misora and Lecty to realize their strengths and weaknesses. But Rico still refuses to join the group. Due to her arrogance towards her classmates but has the ability to plan ahead with her glasses. So Kanata gave her a choice, whether to join the group or be a loser forever.
6	"The Skies, Taken"; Transliteration: "Ubawa reshi sora" (Japanese: 奪われし空)	August 12, 2015
A surprise attack of Devil Beetles catches the Sky Wizards off guard. This allows a detachment of Devil Beetles to enter the city. The only Sky Wizards remaining in the city are those tasked with non-combat duties. Fireteam E601 is among them. Fireteam E601 defends the inner city of Mistgun.
7	"Mistgun Tournament"; Transliteration: "Misutogan tōnamento" (Japanese: ミストガン・トーナメント)	August 19, 2015
In order to accelerate the training of battle ready Sky Wizards, Chloe organizes a grand tournament with lucrative prizes. Kanata sees this as a prime opportunity to push Fireteam E601 into the spotlight. But the stakes get higher with Freon going to great lengths to getting Kanata dismissed and his class disbanded.
8	"Beyond the Rankings"; Transliteration: "Ranku o koete" (Japanese: ランクを超えて)	August 26, 2015
Kanata and Fireteam E601 begin a new training session, which Rico catches on too quickly. Meanwhile, a mysterious hooded figure assaults students of the Sky Wizards Academy at night. Later on, Kanata talks with Yuri, leading Fireteam E601 to mistakenly believe that she is Kanata's girlfriend. The team stalks or spies on Kanata for the rest of the day.
9	"The Victory Formula"; Transliteration: "Hisshō no hōteishiki" (Japanese: 必勝の方程式)	September 2, 2015
With the team roles shuffled again, Lecty begins to have serious doubts about the effect of this new training session. Despite patrols guarding the entire town, the mysterious figure's attacks against the students continues. Also Yuri is targeted with Kanata able to save her from doom.
10	"Potentials of the Zero"; Transliteration: "Zero ga umidasu kanōsei" (Japanese: ゼロが生み出す可能性)	September 9, 2015
Lecty and Rico have passed Kanata's test. They seem to be getting along well. However, Misora is still lost. Misora's frustrations grow as Lecty and Rico show off their skills in training. Before Misora is ready, the Mistgun tournament begins. After seeing what Lecty and Rico is doing, Misora finally understands about leadership and teamwork.
11	"The Finals, And..."; Transliteration: "Kesshōsen, soshite..." (Japanese: 決勝戦、そして...)	September 16, 2015
Against all odds, Fireteam E601 scores victory after unexpected victory. Fireteam E601 defies the expectations of everyone watching except their instructor Kanata. Fireteam E601 must fight Yuri's Fireteam A227, the crowd favorite, in the final match of the Mistgun tournament. This gives Fireteam E601 a test in teamwork.
12	"Instructor of the Sky Wizards Academy"; Transliteration: "Kūsen Madōshi Kōhosei no Kyōkan" (Japanese: 空戦魔導士候補生の教官)	September 23, 2015
Fireteam E601 defeats Fireteam A227 in the final match of the Mistgun tournament. Before Fireteam E601 can be announced as the winners of the Mistgun tournament, the alarms for the Devil Beetles arrival to attack Mistgun City goes off. The mysterious figure who attacked Sky Wizards Academy students is revealed to be Real Nua. Real has a crush on Yuri and is obsessed with her to the point of harming her. He merges with a Devil Beetle Chimera and attacks Kanata, Fireteam E601, and Yuri. All five defend themselves against the mutated Real Nua and defeat him. Fireteam E601 is announced as the winners of the Mistgun tournament and allowed to stay in school. However, they do not receive the prizes for winning the Mistgun tournament because the new weapons and part of Mistgun City were destroyed when the Devil Beetles attacked. Yuri joins Fireteam E601 as a new member in accordance with the deal she made with Kanata before the Mistgun tournament began. Yuri confesses her love to Kanata in the form of a cake saying, "I love you".
OVA	"Lechty's Animal Care"; Transliteration: "Rekuti no, iki monogatari" (Japanese: レクティの、いきものがたり)	March 9, 2016

== Reception ==
The anime series' first episode garnered negative reviews from Anime News Network's staff during the Summer 2015 season previews. Nick Creamer put it alongside Absolute Duo and World Break for being a "cheap anime promo for a light novel fantasy-action harem", criticizing the first half for its "long, budget-efficient monologue" and the second half containing outdated and cliché humor from its given genre, concluding that its "very lethargically paced, heavy on unnecessary exposition and slow in the introduction of its obvious premise." Bamboo Dong found the opening action scene dull and poorly animated, and saw the anime being "creatively bankrupt" with its premise, characters and jokes. Hope Chapman felt the episode represented Diomedéa taking Studio ARMS' position of producing low budget, schlocky trash with a "distinctly light-novel flavor", saying "[T]here's nothing pretty to look at, no endearing characters, not a drop of originality in the plot, and it's just plain no fun to watch." Theron Martin gave credit to the character designs and development of Kanata but felt it wasn't enough to excuse the less than enthusiastic execution of the overall story, characters and visuals, calling it "a limp, painfully directive waste of effort." Fellow ANN editor Rebecca Silverman reviewed the complete anime series in 2016. She commended the effort made to give character development to its cast (singling out Real for being "the most extreme and interesting") and was surprised by the good background music, but was critical of the overall stockiness of the cast, awkward animation in both character anatomy and movements, and poor story developments concluding that "this is just like every other magic high school harem show, from the characters to the story arcs, and it ends with questions remaining that we aren't likely to get answered any time soon."
