= Dai-Shogun – Great Revolution =

Television anime

- Dai-Shogun – Great Revolution key visual

風雲維新ダイ☆ショーグン (Fūun Ishin Dai Shōgun)
- Genre: Action, comedy, mecha
- Anime television series
- Directed by: Takashi Watanabe
- Produced by: Jun'ichirō Tamura; Takashi Tachizaki; Yuji Matsukura
- Written by: Dai Satō
- Music by: Bandai Namco Studios
- Studio: J.C.Staff; A.C.G.T
- Licensed by: AUS: Madman Entertainment; BI: MVM Entertainment; NA: Sentai Filmworks
- Original network: Tokyo MX, Sun TV, BS11, KBS, MTV, TV Saitama, CTC, tvk, GBS, TVQ
- Original run: April 9, 2014 – June 26, 2014
- Episodes: 12

Dai-Shogun – Great Revolution (風雲維新ダイ☆ショーグン, Fūun Ishin Dai Shōgun) is a mecha anime television series, directed by Takashi Watanabe and animated by J.C.Staff and A.C.G.T. It aired on April 9, 2014, on Tokyo MX and finished on June 26, 2014. The mecha design is by Makoto Ishiwata of Nitroplus.

A 3D film reboot of the series was planned to be released but failed to meet the Kickstarter goal back in 2016, ultimately freezing the series indefinitely.

== Premise ==
In an alternate history Japan where the Meiji Restoration never happened, foreign ships are repelled by ancient giant robots called Onigami. Subsequently, Japan has remained isolated from the rest of the world.

== Characters ==
Keiichirō Tokugawa (徳川 慶一郎, Tokugawa Keiichirō)
Voiced by: Tetsuya Kakihara

Main hero raised in a public bathhouse in Nagasaki. He can't control his fiery energy well enough to become the strongest man, and spends his days taking on fights. He has dominated Nagasaki, but is not satisfied. There is a certain reason for which he breaks out in hives when he touches women, and that is why he is still a virgin. However, he does not know that being a virgin has great meaning to him.

Kiriko Hattori (服部 霧子, Hattori Kiriko)
Voiced by: Ayako Kawasumi

Female ninja from Iga. She was raised with strict discipline as a ninja to carry out missions with loyalty and in cold blood. For this reason, she lacks human emotions such as sympathy for others. Her actions place highest priority on the Tokugawa Shogun family and the mission, which leads to many conflicts with Keiichiro.

Chiharu (ちはる)
Voiced by: Yukari Tamura

She looks like a sweet little girl, but is actually half fox demon and half human. Her bushy tail is always sticking out from behind. She is a tomboy with an unyielding spirit, but has long lived as a social outcast because she is half demon. She meets Keiichiro and starts to change as she develops an affection for him.

Hyakusuke (百助)
Voiced by: Hideki Ogihara

Keiichiro's "sworn brother" who adores him unconditionally and always accompanies him. He's not a fighter at all, but is fanatical about foreign countries and machinery and has invented many new machines. Physically weak, he tries desperately to support Keiichiro. He is proud of his slicked topknot hairstyle.

Hyōgo Asai (浅井 兵庫, Asai Hyōgo)
Voiced by: Yoko Hikasa

Hōkōin (法光院)
Voiced by: Miyuki Sawashiro

A voluptuous and beautiful “mystery woman.” She talks like an oiran, and everything she says is erotic. She confronts Keiichiro and Kiriko several times for a particular purpose. Master of kung fu and uses a giant iron fan.

Shigeyoshi Hitotsubashi (一橋 重義, Hitotsubashi Shigeyoshi)
Voiced by: Takehito Koyasu

Sōji Okita (沖田 総司, Okita Sōji)
Voiced by: Saeko Zogo

Isami Kondō (近藤 勇, Kondō Isamu)
Voiced by: Mina

Toshizō Hijikata (土方 歳三, Hijikata Toshizō)
Voiced by: Sarah Emi Bridcutt

Ryōma Sakamoto (坂本 龍馬, Sakamoto Ryōma)
Voiced by: Hiroshi Tsuchida

Maika Yurihara (由利原 埋火, Yurihara Maika)
Voiced by: Yu Kobayashi

Naosuke Ii (井伊直弼, Ii Naosuke)
Voiced by: Chafurin

Guido Verbeck
Voiced by: Hiroto Kazuki

Thomas Blake Glover
Voiced by: Naomi Kusumi

== Mecha ==
The series feature mechas referred to as Onigami, who are of supernatural origin, and standard man-made steam punk mecha called Steam Puppets. The main mecha of the series is Susanoo, based on the god from Japanese mythology who can turn into different forms depending on who the subpilot is. The other Onigami of the series are Hokoinkugutsu whose main weapon is a naginata and the four-armed Takemikazuchi; these Onigami are piloted by Hokoin and Shigeyoshi, respectively. The Steam Puppets consist of the Deku, used by the Nagisaki police, and Jokikugutsu, used by pirates led by Maika and the minions of Shigeyoshi.

== Episode list ==
No.	Title	Original release date
1	"Succession strife, Keiichirō appears!" Transliteration: "Yotsugi sōran, Keiichirō tōjō!" (Japanese: 世継ぎ騒乱、慶一郎登場!)	April 9, 2014
A series of incidents occur throughout town, where men are serially murdered by a mysterious prostitute. When the culprit is found, she reveals that her ultimate target is Keiichirō, the successor to the Tokugawa household. It is revealed that only Keiichirō has the ability to pilot the giant robot Susanoo buried underneath the town.
2	"The alluring red-light district, and the foxy Chiharu!"; Transliteration: "Senjō no hanamachi, yōko no Chiharu!" (Japanese: 扇情の花街、妖狐のちはる!)	April 16, 2014
In an attempt to spend the night with a woman, Keiichirō visits the red-light district, only to get his wallet stolen by a hostess who is really a fox spirit.
3	"The sex witch Hōkōin strikes!" Transliteration: "Tōsaku no sei ma, hōkōin shūrai!" (Japanese: 倒錯の性魔、法光院襲来!)	April 23, 2014
4	"Susanoo Hijacked! The Vicious Asai Hyōgo!"; Transliteration: "Susanō gōdatsu, karetsunaru Asai Hyōgo!" (Japanese: スサノオ強奪、苛烈なる浅井兵庫！)	April 30, 2014
5	"Later Summer in Nagasaki, on the Night the Lanterns Float"; Transliteration: "Nagasaki banka, tōrōnagashi no yoru ni" (Japanese: 長崎晩夏、灯篭流しの夜に)	May 7, 2014
6	"Shigeyoshi of the Rebellion, The Bloody Surrender of Edo Castle!"; Transliteration: "Tairan no Shigeyoshi, Edo senketsu kaijō!" (Japanese: 大乱の重義、江戸鮮血開城！)	May 14, 2014
7	"Ninja of Passion, the Bloody Shinsengumi!"; Transliteration: "Jōnetsu no ninja, chi no shinsenkumi" (Japanese: 情熱の忍者、血の新撰組)	May 21, 2014
8	"Dejima Dawn, The Greatest Fist in Japan!"; Transliteration: "Dejima no yoake, tenkaichi no ken ze yo" (Japanese: 出島の夜明け、天下一の拳ぜよ)	May 28, 2014
9	"Cherry Blossom Baths Love Stories"; Transliteration: "Sakurayu renbo moyō" (Japanese: 桜湯恋慕模様)	June 4, 2014
10	"After the Rampage, the Two Make Their Decision"; Transliteration: "Bōsō no hate, ketsui no futari" (Japanese: 暴走の果て、決意の二人)	June 11, 2014
11	"Led by the Onigami, to Share Our Fate!"; Transliteration: "Kishin michibikite, unmei o betsutsu!" (Japanese: 鬼神導きて、運命を別つ！)	June 18, 2014
12	"Break the Thunderclouds, Heavenly Thunder God Susanoo!"; Transliteration: "Raiun kirisake, susanō gōten raijin!" (Japanese: 雷雲切り裂け、スサノオ豪天雷神！)	June 25, 2014

== Reboot ==
A 3D film reboot of the series was planned to be released but failed to meet the Kickstarter goal back in 2016, ultimately freezing the series indefinitely.
