= Idol Incidents =

Japanese media mix project

アイドル事変 (Aidoru Jihen)
- Created by: Mages
- Anime television series
- Directed by: Daisuke Yoshida
- Produced by: Fuyuna Iizuka; Hideyuki Saida; Koji Abe; Tomo Shiota; Yukihiro Ito; Manabu Ohtsuka
- Written by: Sōtarō Hayashi; Sumino Kawashima
- Music by: Shūkō Tateyama
- Studio: MAPPA, Studio VOLN
- Licensed by: Crunchyroll
- Original network: Tokyo MX, GYT, Gunma TV, BS Fuji, Sun TV
- Original run: January 8, 2017 – March 27, 2017
- Episodes: 12
- Manga
- Written by: Coco Natsuki
- Published by: Kadokawa Shoten
- Magazine: Dengeki G's Comic; Comic Walker
- Original run: August 25, 2016 – August 30, 2017
- Volumes: 2

Idol Incidents (Japanese: アイドル事変, Hepburn: Aidoru Jihen) is a Japanese media mix project by Mages. The plot revolves around an election battle between idols who represent Japan's 47 prefectures. The character designs are handled by various artists such as CUTEG, Tiv, Mottsun*, Akemi Mikoto, Yōsai Kūchū, Mamu Mitsumoto, and Yukihiro Matsuo. The project was initially announced as a game that planned to be released in Fall 2014, but was postponed until August of the same year. In Summer 2015, the same project was "rebooted" with changes to the work including the stories and characters.

In 2016, an anime adaptation was announced and aired on Tokyo MX and BS Fuji in January 2017 and finished in March 2017.

== Cast ==
Each character and their voice actress represent different prefectures in Japan.

Heroine Party (ヒロイン党, Hiroin tō)

- Sarara Yashima as Natsuki Hoshina (星菜 夏月, Hoshina Natsuki) - Niigata Prefecture
- Mai Fuchigami as Shizuka Onimaru (鬼丸 静, Onimaru Shizuka) - Fukuoka Prefecture
- Reina Ueda as Sachie Kondō (近堂 幸恵, Kondō Sachie) - Toyama Prefecture

Sanrai Party (賛来党, Sanrai tō; a play on the word "sunlight")

- Lynn as Mizuki Fudō (不動 瑞希, Fudō Mizuki) - Tokyo
- Haruka Terui as Sayo Nekohira (猫平 小夜, Nekohira Sayo) - Iwate Prefecture
- Saeko Zōgō as Konatsu Sanjō (新城 小夏, Sanjō Konatsu) - Aichi Prefecture
- Satomi Akesaka as Ruru Kitani (木谷 るる, Kitani Ruru) - Saitama Prefecture
- Sarah Emi Bridcutt as Chinatsu Ryūsekidō (竜石堂 ちなつ, Ryūsekidō Chinatsu) - Fukushima Prefecture
- Etsuko Hosaki (保崎 悦子, Hosaki Etsuko) - Gunma Prefecture
- Sora Amamiya as Elanor Saionji (西園寺 エレアノール, Saionji Eranōru) - Tokyo
- Aya Suzaki as Himawari Ikka (一花 ひまわり, Ikka Himawari) - Ishikawa Prefecture
- Umi Hioki (日沖 羽美, Hioki Umi) - Mie Prefecture
- Ririka Aozasa (青笹 りりか, Aozasa Ririka) - Shimane Prefecture
- Misako Tomioka as Otome Kiyotō (清遠 乙女, Kiyotō Otome) - Kōchi Prefecture
- Aya Tsuji as Himena Yumeno (夢乃 姫奈, Yumeno Himena) - Ehime Prefecture
- Asuka Ōgame as Rin Kanokogi (鹿子木 鈴, Kanokogi Rin) - Kumamoto Prefecture
- Atsumi Tanezaki as Koharu Akamine (赤峰 こはる, Akamine Koharu) - Ōita Prefecture

Starry Party (スターライ党, Sutārai tō; a play on the word "starlight")

- Yurika Kubo as Sakurako Īzuka (飯塚 桜子, Īzuka Sakurako) - Nara Prefecture
- Chika Anzai as Isuzu Narukami (鳴神 五十鈴, Narukami Isuzu) - Wakayama Prefecture
- Ibuki Kido as Shirayuki Arai (綾井 しらゆき, Arai Shirayuki) - Kagawa Prefecture
- Miho Arakawa as Kanade Hōkyō (鳳京 奏, Hōkyō Kanade) - Miyagi Prefecture
- Mikako Komatsu as Yū Murase (村瀬 優, Murase Yū) - Yamanashi Prefecture
- Mami Naruse as Mana Wakashiro (若代 真菜, Wakashiro Mana) - Shiga Prefecture
- Akane Kohinata as Chiaki Kadonaga (門永 千晶, Kadonaga Chiaki) - Tottori Prefecture
- Kaori Sadohara as Tsubaki Yukinoshita (雪ノ下 椿, Yukinoshita Tsubaki) - Okayama Prefecture
- Kumi Takaragi as Mikoto Kōrogi (興梠 美琴, Kōrogi Mikoto) - Miyazaki Prefecture

Bishōjo Party (美少女党, Bishōjo tō)

- Sayaka Nakaya as Ume Momoi (桃井 梅, Momoi Ume) - Kanagawa Prefecture
- Haruka Nagashima as Sakura Isuzugawa (五十鈴川 桜, Isuzugawa Sakura) - Yamagata Prefecture
- Kotori Koiwai as Hiyori Kitanaka (北仲 日和, Kitanaka Hiyori) - Kyoto Prefecture
- Shiori Izawa as Monica Chibana (知花 モニカ, Chibana Monika) - Okinawa Prefecture
- Akane Fujita as Hikaru Sawada (澤田 ひかる, Sawada Hikaru) - Shizuoka Prefecture

Wakaba Party (わかば党, Wakaba tō)

- Yu-ri Yoshida as Kuruwa Amō (天羽 くるは, Amō Kuruwa) - Tokushima Prefecture
- Yu Serizawa as Yuna Shimizu (清水 由奈, Shimizu Yuna) - Nagano Prefecture
- Yui Kondo as Yuina Amamiya (雨宮 唯奈, Amamiya Yuina) - Tochigi Prefecture
- Iori Nomizu as Miyu Hirasawa (平沢 みゆ, Hirasawa Miyu) - Hokkaido
- Shizuka Furuya as Shion Kagaya (加賀谷 しおん, Kagaya Shion) - Akita Prefecture
- Haruka Yoshimura as Ako Tsutsumishita (堤下 亜子, Tsutsumishita Ako) - Osaka Prefecture

Subculture Neo-Party (サブカル新党, Sabukaru shintō)

- Chinatsu Akasaki as Mika Kozuru (小水流 ミカ, Kozuru Mika) - Kagoshima Prefecture
- Nao Tōyama as Riina Mitsutake (光武 リイナ, Mitsutake Riina) - Saga Prefecture
- Megu Sakuragawa as Kazuna Yasuda (安田 和奈, Yasuda Kazuna) - Ibaraki Prefecture
- Rina Hidaka as Hatsu Kamegaya (亀ヶ谷 初, Kamegaya Hatsu) - Chiba Prefecture
- Hitomi Harada as Misa Nanase (七瀬 美沙, Nanase Misa) - Yamaguchi Prefecture

SOS Party (SOS党, Esuōesu tō)

- Nozomi Yamamoto as Yamiringo-Sama (闇†林檎様), Aomori Prefecture
- Asuka Nishi as Aina Kingetsu (金月 アイナ, Kingetsu Aina) - Hyōgo Prefecture
- Kaoru Hayano as Jun Aiba (愛場 純, Aiba Jun) - Fukui Prefecture
- Akiko Ōgaki (大垣 秋子, Ōgaki Akiko) - Hiroshima Prefecture
- Nozomi Furuki as Villamaine Kosasa (小佐々 ヴィラマイン, Kosasa Vuiramain) - Nagasaki Prefecture

== Media ==
=== Video game ===
A mobile video game published by HarvesT started its service on October 21, 2016. The game is free and uses an in-app purchase system. The game's servers closed on July 31, 2017.

=== Anime ===
In 2016, an anime adaptation was announced, produced by MAPPA and Studio VOLN. Daisuke Yoshida directed the anime with a script by Sōtarō Hayashi and Sumino Kawashima. Tiv drew the draft of the characters in the anime whilst Mai Ishii adapted the design. The series aired in Japan between January 8, 2017, and March 27, 2017. The opening theme titled "Utae! Ai no Kōyaku!" (歌え！愛の公約; lit. "Sing! Pledge of Love) is sung by Smile♥X, a group formed by different members of each political party in the show, which produced by Tsunku. The ending theme "Respect" is sung by Sarara Yashima and Mai Fuchigami under the unit named "with.". Crunchyroll streamed the anime from January 8, 2017.

==== Episode list ====
No.	English title (Note: Taken from Crunchyroll) Original Japanese title	Insert song(s)	Ending card illustration (Note: Taken from Idol Jihen's anime official Twitter account)	Original release date
1	"Why Become a Dietwoman?"; Transliteration: "Watashi ga kokkai giin ni natte mo" (Japanese: 私が国会議員になっても)	"Start Up, Dream!" by with. (Sarara Yashima & Mai Fuchigami)	Tiv	January 8, 2017
2	"Girl S"; Transliteration: "Shōjo S" (Japanese: 少女S)	"Happy~! Sunrise" (はっぴ〜! Sunrise) by A.I.S (Saeko Zōgō, Haruka Terui, & Satomi Akesaka)	Kūchū Yōsai	January 15, 2017
3	"Nyanway generation"	"It's All Star☆Right彡" by Kirakira (Yurika Kubo, Chika Anzai, & Ibuki Kido)	Kuroyuzu (96yuzu)	January 22, 2017
4	"Shake It! Shōnan Beach"; Transliteration: "Yu-re-te shōnan biichi" (Japanese: ゆ・れ・て湘南ビーチ)	"Honey Moon Cafe" by Honey Trap (Sayaka Nakaya, Haruka Nagashima, Kotori Koiwai, and Shiori Izawa)	Mottsun*	January 29, 2017
5	"Preschool Heaven"; Transliteration: "Houkuen tengoku" (Japanese: 保育園天国)	"Green Fairy" by Carbuncle (Yu-ri Yoshida, Yū Serizawa, & Yui Kondo)	Coco Natsuki	February 5, 2017
6	Transliteration: "TOO SHY SHY GIRL!"	"Gamushara彡Girl" (我武者羅彡ガール) by Mikarina (Chinatsu Akasaki & Nao Tōyama)	Akemi Mikoto	February 12, 2017
7	"My Microphone Isn't Just For Show"; Transliteration: "Kazari janai no yo maiku wa" (Japanese: 飾りじゃないのよマイクは)	-	CUTEG	February 19, 2017
8	"A Miss and Loneliness"; Transliteration: "MISS shite ronrinesu" (Japanese: MISSしてロンリネス)	-	Coco Natsuki	February 26, 2017
9	"Diet Member Suit and Machine Gun"; Transliteration: "Giinfuku to kikanjū" (Japanese: 議員服と機関銃)	"Kirameki ni Symphonia" (煌めきのシンフォニア) by Cherry7 (Yukari Tamura, Kana Ueda, Megumi Toyoguchi, & Sakura Tange)	Mottsun*	March 6, 2017
10	"Dancing Heroines"; Transliteration: "Danshingu hiroin" (Japanese: ダンシング・ヒロイン)	-	Mai Ishii	March 13, 2017
11	"Seriously Live in Five Seconds"; Transliteration: "Maji de Live no 5-byō mae" (Japanese: MajiでLiveの5秒前)	-	Mai Ishii	March 20, 2017
12	"It's All About the Idol Dietwoman"; Transliteration: "Nantetta tte aidoru giin!" (Japanese: なんてったってアイドル議員！)	"Tokimeki Full Throttle" (ときめき Full Throttle) by SMILE♥X	Tiv	March 27, 2017

=== Manga ===
A manga adaptation is serialised in Kadokawa's Dengeki G's Comic and Comic Walker from the September 2016 issue and is illustrated by Coco Natsuki. The first volume was released on February 27, 2017. The second and final volume was released on November 27, 2017.
