= Bridcutt =

Bridcutt is a surname. Notable people with the surname include:

- Liam Bridcutt (born 1989), English footballer
- Sarah Emi Bridcutt (born 1989), Japanese voice actress
