= Noucome =

Japanese light novel series and its adaptations

- Cover of the first light novel volume featuring Chocolat.

俺の脳内選択肢が、学園ラブコメを全力で邪魔している (Ore no Nōnai Sentakushi ga, Gakuen Rabu Kome o Zenryoku de Jama Shiteiru)
- Genre: Comedy, romance, slice of life
- Light novel
- Written by: Takeru Kasukabe
- Illustrated by: Yukiwo
- Published by: Kadokawa Shoten
- Imprint: Kadokawa Sneaker Bunko
- Original run: February 1, 2012 – February 1, 2016
- Volumes: 12
- Manga
- Written by: Takeru Kasukabe
- Illustrated by: Sayaka Itsuki
- Published by: Enterbrain
- Magazine: Famitsu Comic Clear
- Original run: February 1, 2013 – May 1, 2015
- Volumes: 5
- Anime television series
- Directed by: Takayuki Inagaki
- Written by: Hiroko Kanasugi
- Music by: Sakai Asuka
- Studio: Diomedéa
- Licensed by: AUS: Madman Entertainment; NA: Sentai Filmworks
- Original network: Tokyo MX, Sun TV, TVQ, GBS, MTV, BS11, CTC, tvk, TVS
- English network: US: Anime Network
- Original run: October 10, 2013 – December 12, 2013
- Episodes: 10 + OVA
- icon

Noucome (のうコメ, Nōkome), short for My Mental Choices are Completely Interfering with my School Romantic Comedy (俺の脳内選択肢が、学園ラブコメを全力で邪魔している, Ore no Nōnai Sentakushi ga, Gakuen Rabu Kome o Zenryoku de Jama Shiteiru), is a Japanese light novel series written by Takeru Kasukabe, with illustrations by Yukiwo. Kadokawa Shoten published 12 volumes between February 2012 and February 2016. A manga adaptation by Sayaka Itsuki was serialized in Enterbrain's Famitsu Comic Clear. A ten-episode anime television series adaptation, directed by Takayuki Inagaki and produced by Diomedéa, aired between October and December 2013.

== Plot ==
Kanade Amakusa is a high school student who is suffering from a curse called "Absolute Choices" (絶対選択肢, Zettai Sentakushi). This curse requires him to select an action from a list of two or three options that appear before him at any time. He has no control over what choices appear. Many of them are weird or perverse and as a result, the curse has tainted his reputation with his classmates and other people around him, making his life difficult. However, one day, a choice he makes on his way home from school causes a mysterious, beautiful, young girl to fall from the sky. Amakusa discovers that she was sent from the God World to assist him in completing a series of missions given to him directly by God himself. After completing these missions, the "Absolute Choices" curse will be lifted from Amakusa; but should he fail in completing any of the missions, he will be stuck with the curse forever.

As the story progresses, the options change, such as a new option suddenly appearing, or the options suddenly disappearing before a choice is made, or even giving chances to decline all options. According to Amakusa, the three types of options are: options that force the person to take certain actions, options that alter other people physically or mentally who will not retain the memory afterward, and options that have unpredictable outcomes.

== Characters ==
=== Main characters ===
Kanade Amakusa (甘草 奏, Amakusa Kanade)
Voiced by: Toshiyuki Toyonaga, Ikumi Hayama (female form)
Kanade suffers from "Absolute Choices", a curse that forces him to choose one of two or more options. If he doesn't choose, he develops an unbearable migraine. In the beginning, he meets Chocolat and learns that to end the curse, he has to complete a series of "missions". Failing to finish any mission before its deadline will result in the curse staying forever. As the result of "Absolute Choices," his classmates view him as a weird person and thus he has become one of the "Reject Five". He is the object of affection for most of the girls in the Reject Five, but is mostly oblivious to their feelings and is annoyed by their eccentric natures.
Chocolat (ショコラ, Shokora)
Voiced by: Kaori Sadohara
The beautiful girl who falls from the sky after Amakusa chooses the option "a beautiful girl falls from the sky" when given an Absolute Choice on his way home from school one day. She chooses the name "Chocolat" when Kanade gives her a box of chocolates to eat. She was sent from the God World to help Kanade complete the "missions" in order to remove the curse. However, she is quite air-headed, making her ineffective when assisting Kanade. According to her, she lost her memory prior to receiving the mission, including how to resolve the curse. In the second novel, she transfers into Kanade's class as his "pet".
Sometimes, when she bumps her head or gets drunk, an inner Chocolat, who has not lost her memories, appears for a short time. Unlike her counterpart, this Chocolat is smart, helpful and has a better idea about the curse. She reverts to her usual self if she bumps her head again or becomes sober. According to her, Chocolat will return to the God World once the curse has ended. At one point, after regaining her memory, she tries to seduce Kanade, but fails because a chocolate box hits her head, returning her to normal. It is also confirmed that she has developed romantic feelings for Kanade and is jealous of the other girls. In the final episode, she confesses and chases him for his answer before being rejected but makes it clear she hasn't given up on him.

=== Reject Five ===
The "Reject Five" (お断り5, Okotowari 5) are the five students at Kanade's school who, although they are physically attractive, have certain defects in their personalities.
Furano Yukihira (雪平 ふらの, Yukihira Furano)
Voiced by: Yui Kondo
A girl who sits behind Kanade in class. She has a weird sense of humor and will often tell jokes with a blank expression. She has feelings for Kanade, but exhibits a tsundere attitude towards him. She also has a secret passion for cute things, especially a character called "White Pig", but only reveals this side of her if no one familiar is around.
Ōka Yūōji (遊王子 謳歌, Yūōji Ōka)
Voiced by: Ayumi Tsuji
Kanade's classmate, who normally acts like a naive, hyperactive air-head, but is also smart and constructs strange devices. She is the daughter of the president of UOG, a company that manufactures a large array of products. She is aware of Kanade's missions, although she does not know the reason behind them, and will sometimes try to help. She has feelings for Kanade, but she is too shy to reveal them and can only tease him to express herself though will only get embarrassed when around Kanade.
Yuragi Hakoniwa (箱庭 ゆらぎ, Hakoniwa Yuragi)
Voiced by: Naomi Ōzora
Kanade's childhood friend. She has a habit of calling everyone older-brother or older-sister. According to her, she will feel ill if she calls anyone anything other than older-brother or older-sister, or if anyone calls her older-sister.
Himeru Hisoka (密 秘, Hisoka Himeru)
A senior student. She shows interest in both males and females and has even seduced girls whose boyfriends she has stolen. In the fourth light novel, Seira tasks her with making Kanade fall in love with her, but she is unable to do so.
Karasu Yumeshima (夢島 カラス, Yumeshima Karasu)
Voiced by: Masami Iwasaki
A senior student. He is one of the leaders of the odd students at school and always wears a mask.

=== Popular Five ===
The five most popular students in school; the opposite of the Reject Five.
Seira Kokubyakuin (黒白院 清羅, Kokubyakuin Seira)
Voiced by: Hiromi Igarashi
The student council president and leader of the Popular Five. She also knows about Kanade's curse, but instead of helping him, she uses her knowledge to make fun of him. She appears to have some connection to the God World, and knows more about the curse than any other character. According to her, "falling in love" is actually the ultimate mission to remove the curse, yet she refuses to reveal any more detail.
Sōka Shishimori (獅子守 想牙, Shishimori Sōka)
Voiced by: Takayuki Kondō
The student council vice president and the most popular boy in school. He is a normal student and is tired of the Reject Five's weird antics. He has five younger sisters, explaining his aversion to 'younger sister' characters. He is calm and cold-hearted.
Konagi Yawakaze (柔風 小凪, Yawakaze Konagi)
Voiced by: Misato
Yūōji's best friend, she is very pure and innocent. Although she feels embarrassed around male students, as she rarely spends time around them, she wants to learn to do so. She is the third most popular girl in the school and has many admirers who wish to guard her and protect her innocence. If any student attempts to do something of a perverted nature with her, her "guards" will beat that person up. Kanade has been a victim of several of these beatings, due to his "curse" often requiring him to make perverted decisions. Like Yūōji, she has feelings for Kanade, with him being the only boy she is comfortable around, despite his antics with his curse.
Ayame Reikadō (麗華堂 絢女, Reikadō Ayame)
Voiced by: Rei Matsuzaki
A proud and harsh female student, she has large breasts and often argues with Yukihira, who is not as well endowed. Amakusa learns that her breasts have been augmented by plastic surgery by means of his curse; Yukihira also becomes aware of this by touching them. Both of them choose to keep her secret. According to Ayame, her harsh personality and the reason for the plastic surgery are both because of her childhood friend who loves tsundere girls.
Tōya Yoshiwara (吉原 桃夜, Yoshiwara Tōya)
Voiced by: Kazutomi Yamamoto
A freshman. Usually quiet, but who is actually a womanizer.

=== Others ===
Utage Dōraku (道楽 宴, Dōraku Utage)
Voiced by: Akiko Yajima
Amakusa's homeroom teacher who was afflicted with the "Absolute Choices" curse in the past. Although she is able to discuss and share some information about the curse with Amakusa, she is unable to tell him how to end the curse or she starts suffering from painful headaches, as a residual affect of the curse. She covers for Kanade when he has to choose embarrassing options from the "Absolute Choices" when she can. Due to one of the major choices she was forced to make, she has the appearance of an elementary school girl, despite being 29.
God (神, Kami)
Voiced by: Shinnosuke Tachibana
The God in charge of Amakusa's "missions" for removing the curse. He is rather sloppy and usually teases Amakusa with the curse, earning him the epithet Chara-Kami (チャラ神, "Flippant God"). According to him, he has just taken the job recently and cannot offer too much help in removing the curse. He also states that he isn't the one who offers the choices; the god that does so is unknown.
Aoi Nishino (西野葵, Nishino Aoi)
Voiced by: Shin Ginoza
Aoi is a feminine looking senior student a who attends Seikou Private School. Despite being in high school like the rest of the characters, he has the appearance of a grade-schooler and the personality of a small child. It is said that he's one of the highest-ranked students in the school.
Kazama (笠間)
Voiced by: Takehiro Hasu
Kazama is a male student who attends Seikou Private School. He is known as The Beast Of Roses.
Ishioka (石岡)
Voiced by: Teppei Akahira
Ishioka is a male who attends Seikou Private School. He is known as The Sweets King.
Sakuragawa (桜川)
Voiced by: Shusaku Shirakawa
Sakuragawa is another male student at Seikou Private School. He is known as The Emperor In The Nude.

== Media ==
=== Print ===
The light novels are written by Takeru Kasukabe, with illustrations by Yukiwo. Kadokawa Shoten published 12 volumes under their Kadokawa Sneaker Bunko imprint between February 1, 2012, and February 1, 2016.

A manga adaptation, illustrated by Sayaka Itsuki, was serialized in Enterbrain's Famitsu Comic Clear online magazine between February 1, 2013, and May 1, 2015. Enterbrain published five tankōbon volumes between July 13, 2013, and June 15, 2015.

=== Anime ===
A 10-episode anime television series adaptation, directed by Takayuki Inagaki and produced by Diomedéa, aired in Japan between October 10 and December 12, 2013, on Tokyo MX, Sun TV, and TVQ, and was simulcast by Crunchyroll. The screenplay is written by Hiroko Kanasugi, and chief animation director Hiroyuki Saida based the character design used in the anime on Yukiwo's original concept. The sound director is Takayuki Yamaguchi, and the music is produced by Mages. The opening theme is "S・M・L☆" (Sweet Melty Love) by Afilia Saga and the ending theme is "Taiyō to Tsuki no Cross" (太陽と月のCROSS) by Two Formula, a group consisting of Kaori Sadohara and Saeko Sōgō. An additional episode was released on Blu-ray Disc along with the eighth light novel volume on May 20, 2014.

| No. | Official English title Original Japanese title | Original release date |
|---|---|---|
| 1 | "Kanade Amakusa's Not-So-Sweet Daily Life"; Transliteration: "Amakusa Kanade no Amakunai Nichijō" (Japanese: 甘草奏の甘くない日常) | October 10, 2013 |
| 1 | "Kanade Amakusa's Not-So-Smell Natto"; Transliteration: "Amakusa Kanade no Kusakunai Nattō" (Japanese: 甘草奏の臭くない納豆) | October 10, 2013 |
Kanade, after a long day of embarrassing choices, is prompted with either having a beautiful girl fall from the sky or the flirty street cleaner fall from the sky. He chooses the former and a girl later named Chocolat falls from the sky.
| 2 | "Secret Technique! Make Them Laugh with a Pig-ish Joke!"; Transliteration: "Higi Ari! Butakkujōku de Warawasero!" (Japanese: 秘技あり!ブタックジョークで笑わせろ!) | October 17, 2013 |
| 2 | "Objection! Buttaku Trial"; Transliteration: "Igi Ari! Burakku Saiban" (Japanese: 異議あり!ブタック裁判) | October 17, 2013 |
To Kanade's chagrin, Chocolat quickly makes herself at home, and someone identified as God calls his mobile phone, tasking him with missions that must be fulfilled in order to end Absolute Choice. The first mission is to make Yukihara laugh, which proves difficult as Furano assumes that Kanade is simply making fun of her. To make matters worse, Yukihara starts crying on the school roof.
| 3 | "Girls and Panties"; Transliteration: "Gāruzu & Panchirā" (Japanese: がーるず&ぱんちらー) | October 24, 2013 |
| 3 | "You'll Still Look Through The Panties Even If It's Man's?"; Transliteration: "Otokomono demo Pantsu ga Mitai?" (Japanese: 男物でもパンツが見たい?) | October 24, 2013 |
After chasing Yukihara to the school roof, Kanade slips on a banana he took with him, and Yukihara erupts into uncontrollable laughter. Kanade's next objective is to get a glimpse of Konagi Yawakaze's panties. On top of its absurdity, each attempt to do so elicits the wrath of a group of bodyguards committed to preserving her image. On a shopping trip, Kanade and Ōka attack a ruffian, allowing Kanade to see the panties Ōka is wearing in the process; as the panties were initially intended for Konagi, so the mission is completed.
| 4 | "Harem is Wonderful!"; Transliteration: "Hāremu wa SubaraC!" (Japanese: ハーレムはスバラC!) | October 31, 2013 |
| 4 | "The Greatest Feeling in The World!"; Transliteration: "Sekai de Ichiban KimochiE!" (Japanese: 世界で一番キモチE!) | October 31, 2013 |
Chocolat joins Kanade's class and he is presented with a new choice. He picks time in a harem that he soon discovers is not what he expects. Little does he know that his choice left him being chased by the most popular boys in the school. This leads to the school president instigating a battle between the five most popular individuals in the school, the Popular Five, and the Reject Five, and to a new mission for Kanade. He has to make all of the girls in the upcoming battle say they like him.
| 5 | "The Little Sister Shows Up"; Transliteration: "Imōto, Arawaru" (Japanese: 妹、あらわる) | November 7, 2013 |
| 5 | "Stomach Gets Upset"; Transliteration: "I, Motareru" (Japanese: 胃、もたれる) | November 7, 2013 |
Kanade struggles to make all the girls in the upcoming battle like him, and must find one more person to join their team. While searching for a team member, Kanade realizes that the girls in the upcoming battle don't have to love him. Thus, Kanade asks Yuouji if she likes him as person, to which she replies yes. Later, an old childhood friend named Yuragi bumps into Kanade calling him "onii-san". Yuragi then asks multiple people to be their "onee-chan", making him realize she could fit perfectly in the Reject Five. She joins the team and tells Kanade she likes him without being asked.
| 6 | "Tiger! Tiger! Tiger!"; Transliteration: "Tora Tora Tora!" (Japanese: トラトラトラ!) | November 14, 2013 |
| 6 | "Pig! Pig! Pig!"; Transliteration: "Buta Buta Buta!" (Japanese: ぶたぶたぶた!) | November 14, 2013 |
| 7 | "Seira Sortie!"; Transliteration: "Seira Shutsugeki!" (Japanese: 清羅出撃!) | November 21, 2013 |
| 7 | "Seira, Don't Make Me Take My Clothes Off"; Transliteration: "Seira, Fuku o Nugasanaide" (Japanese: 清羅、服を脱がさないで) | November 21, 2013 |
| 8 | "My Freeloader Can't Be This Smart!?"; Transliteration: "Ore no Isōrō ga Konna ni Kashikoi Hazu ga Nai!?" (Japanese: 俺の居候がこんなに賢いはずがない!?) | November 28, 2013 |
| 8 | "My Thing Can't Be This Amazing!?"; Transliteration: "Ore no Ichibutsu ga Konna ni Sugoi Hazu ga Nai!?" (Japanese: 俺の一物がこんなに凄いはずがない!?) | November 28, 2013 |
Chocolat regains her memory and begins to show a different side, prompting Kanade to wonder which side he prefers. After explaining what she knows about Absolute Choice, Chocolat begins behaving very strangely toward Kanade, attempting to kiss him. In the process, she is hit in the head and reverts to her usual self.
| 9 | "Gasp! A Swimming Contest Filled With Girls!"; Transliteration: "Doki! Bishōjo Darake no Suiei Taikai" (Japanese: ドキッ!美少女だらけの水泳大会) | December 5, 2013 |
| 9 | "Flex! A Muscle Contest Filled With Bros!"; Transliteration: "Muki! Aniki Darake no Kinniku Taikai" (Japanese: ムキッ!アニキだらけの筋肉大会) | December 5, 2013 |
| 9 | "Earthenware! An Excavation Contest Filled With Jomon Pottery!"; Transliteration: "Doki! Jōmonshiki Darake no Hakkutsu Taikai" (Japanese: 土器っ!縄文式だらけの発掘大会) | December 5, 2013 |
| 10 | "Life is Series of Choices"; Transliteration: "Jinsei wa, Sentaku no Renzoku de aru" (Japanese: 人生は、選択の連続である) | December 12, 2013 |
| 10 | "Life is Series of Chores"; Transliteration: "Jinsei wa, Sentaku no Renzoku de aru" (Japanese: 人生は、洗濯の連続である) | December 12, 2013 |
| OVA | Transliteration: "Kataomoi ☆ Otome" (Japanese: カタオモイ☆乙女) | May 20, 2014 |
| OVA | Transliteration: "Kata Omoi ☆ Tome" (Japanese: 肩重い☆トメ) | May 20, 2014 |
| OVA | Transliteration: "Katahō Gei ☆ Katahō Homo" (Japanese: 片方ゲイ☆片方ホモ) | May 20, 2014 |

== Notes and references ==
Notes
