= Upotte!! =

Japanese manga and anime series

- Upotte! manga cover as released by Kadokawa Shoten, featuring the main protagonist, Funco

うぽって!!
- Genre: Comedy, girls with guns
- Manga
- Written by: Kitsune Tennouji
- Published by: Kadokawa Shoten
- Magazine: Young Ace; 4-Koma Nano Ace; Shōnen Ace
- Original run: 2009 – present
- Volumes: 14
- Original net animation
- Directed by: Takao Kato
- Written by: Naruhisa Arakawa
- Music by: Yukari Hashimoto
- Studio: Xebec
- Licensed by: NA: Sentai Filmworks
- Released: April 8, 2012 – June 9, 2012
- Episodes: 10 + OVA

Upotte!! (うぽって!!) is a Japanese manga series by Kitsune Tennouji which began serialization in July 2009. An original net animation (ONA) series by Xebec was streamed on Nico Nico Douga and Crunchyroll between April and June 2012. The series started airing on Japanese television in July 2012.

Its title comes from reverse-spelling of 鉄砲 (Teppou; gun(s)).

== Plot ==
The series takes place at a school known as Seishou Academy. Unlike an average school, all the students are actually personifications of guns, training to one day become a useful weapon, and is divided up into elementary school (submachine guns), middle school (assault rifles & shotguns), and high school (battle rifles & sniper rifles). They are capable of drawing the weapons they represent from out of thin air and using them, and any student or his/her manifested gun can suffer from any gun-related problem the other might have. All students in Seishou train to shoot their target (literally) using live ammunition. The series mainly focuses on an FN FNC assault rifle nicknamed Funco and her friends with their human teacher.

== Characters ==
The main characters as they appear in the anime adaptation. From left to right: Ichiroku, Elle, Funco and Sig.

=== Assault Rifle Class ===
(Belgium) Funco (ふんこ, Funko)
Voiced by: Iori Nomizu (Japanese); Genevieve Simmons (English)
The main protagonist, an energetic girl who is a Belgian FN FNC. She is the younger sister of Fal, and she is noted to write in Dutch (as opposed to French). As the real FNC has a skeleton stock, she wears a thong instead of panties, much to her embarrassment and occasional anger. Ever since their first meeting, she has displayed an affection towards her homeroom teacher, though the feelings are one-sided.
(United States) Ichiroku (いちろく)
Voiced by: Misuzu Togashi (Japanese); Brittney Karbowski (English)
Funco's best friend, who nicknames her Fukko (ふッこ) due to a spelling mistake. She has an energetic personality and a foul mouth with Osaka dialect, but is very kind. She is an American M16A4 assault rifle (her name literally means "one" and "six") and has a large number of fans, as she is usually photographed for the cover of specialized gun magazines. In non-combat action, she tends to rapidly alternate between bursts of activity and sudden rests, relating to her namesake's three-round burst fire only capacity. She is Ichihachi's own sister, who was adopted by the Colt family, and Ichiyon's younger foster sister-in-law.
(Switzerland) Sig (しぐ, Shigu)
Voiced by: Kaori Sadohara (Japanese); Emily Neves (English)
Another close friend of Funco. She is a Swiss SIG SG 550 assault rifle. Her grades are top notch and she's an honor student, but a bit out of it at times. She sports exceptional firing accuracy at mid-to-long-range (using improved 5.56×45mm GP90 rounds instead of standard 5.56×45mm NATO rounds) and able to survive in freezing temperature (similar to real SG 550), and doesn't like to lose. She appears to have feelings for Funco and gets jealous when others get close to her.
(United Kingdom) Elle (える, Eru)
Voiced by: Misato (Japanese); Nancy Novotny (English)
Another close friend of Funco and Ichiroku's roommate. She is a British L85A1 assault rifle (her name stands for the letter "L" in her weapon's name). Shy and clumsy, she has an unreliable nature and the habit of breaking a lot, but is very enduring for the sake of her friends, just like her namesake gun. She idolizes Funco's elder sister Fal.
(United States) / (Japan) Ichihachi (いちはち)
Voiced by: Aya Gōda (Japanese); Juliet Simmons (English)
Funco's roommate (Funco nicknames her Hach-chan) and Ichiroku's own sister, who stayed with the failed Armalite family. She is a Japan-made American AR-18 assault rifle (her name literally means "one" and "eight"). She is often troubled by her loose pants as a result of the real AR-18, which has a loose stock.
(Finland) Sako (サコ)
Voiced by: Madoka Yamanaka (Japanese); Maggie Flecknoe (English)
A transfer student and rather vicious control freak determined to defeat Ichiroku in the mock battle. She is a Finnish SAKO RK 95 TP assault rifle. Following the mock battle tournament, she has taken a liking to Funco and has even taken her first kiss when Sako leaves the school. She has elf-like ears.
(Israel) Galil (ガリル, Gariru)
Voiced by: Mariko Honda (Japanese); Beth Lazarou (English)
Another transfer student and Sako's partner. She is an Israeli Galil AR, and just like Sako, she harbors a rivalry towards Ichiroku as both are variants of an old enemy of hers, the AK-47. After losing the mock battle, she decides to stay at the school despite Sako's departure becoming quite fond of Ichihachi, who helped her on that time. She also has blue dog ears and a tail. She is sometimes nicknamed "Miss Kitty", mostly by Ichiroku.
(Austria) Aug (あぐ, Agu)
Voiced by: Shizuka Furuya (Japanese); Molly Searcy (English)
Member of the student council. She is an Austrian Steyr AUG A1 and just like her namesake weapon can change barrels for different uses, Aug has two personalities: one with short hair, timid and friendly, and another with long hair that is aggressive and imposing; her short hair is a wig. Both personalities have their own issues regarding Funco; while one is too shy to approach Funco, the other usually leaves her scared.
(Taiwan) Tei (てい)
Voiced by: Yuka Iguchi (Japanese); Tiffany Grant (English)
Aug's close friend who supports her in confessing her feelings for Funco. She is a Taiwanese T91 and is usually nicknamed "Fountain" by Ichiroku because of the multiple pigtails she wears throughout her hair.
(Argentina) Fara (ふぁら)
Voiced by: Yuiko Tatsumi (Japanese); Cynthia Martinez (English)
She is an Argentine FARA 83 assault rifle.
(Spain) Modelo (もどろ, Modoro)
Voiced by: Mariya Ise (Japanese); Kendall McClellan (English)
She is a Spanish CETME Model L assault rifle.
(Singapore) Hachihachi (はちはち)
Voiced by: Yoshino Nanjou (Japanese); Allison Sumrall (English)
She is a Singaporean SR 88 assault rifle.
(Singapore) Sar (さー, Saa)
Voiced by: Satomi Satou (Japanese); Beth Lazarou (English)
She is a Singaporean SAR 21 assault rifle. She has a crush on the Human teacher.
(Germany) Chuthree (ちゅーすり, Chūsuri)
Voiced by: Chinatsu Akasaki
She is a German HK33E assault rifle and Jeethree's younger sister. She is often nicknamed "Chuthree" after her sister (claimed to be failed derivative of G3), which annoys her, while Ichihachi calls her "Mimi" after the two 3s in her name.
(Italy) Emthree (Emusuri)
She is an Italian Benelli M3 shotgun and member of the student council.
(United States) Emfour (Emuforu)
Vice-president of the student council, she is an American M4A1 assault rifle.
(Italy) Betty
An Italian Beretta SC70/90 assault rifle. During the trip to the beach, she sets some schemes to get close to Genkoku, much to Funco's jealousy.
(Japan) Type 89
She is a Japanese Howa Type 89 assault rifle. Having a timid demeanor, she can't leave Japan just like her fellow rifle Type 64, for being exclusively designed for use of the JSDF.
(Belgium) Cal
Funco's direct elder sister, a FN CAL assault rifle. Was introduced to be included in the big fight Seishou Academy had with Red Steel at Hakone. However, to imitate the constant breakdown it suffers across its production life and extremely poor sales with led to the FN FNC (Funco) being made, she is shown to have an extreme tummyache while travelling to the fightzone which renders her useless and went back home without even reaching Hakone.
(Sweden) Fem
A Swedish Ak 5 assault rifle. Spy for Sako and due to her lookalike with Funco (Being a licensed copy of the FN FNC that's made for the Swedish), was captured and lured Fal into a trap which caused Fal to be destroyed into pieces in the process.
(France) Famas
A French FAMAS bullpup assault rifle. Working with a Japanese police department in ridding of crime in the northern sector of the Kanto region. Tried to stop the fight between Seishou and Red Steel (Akagane) with Type 89 and Type 64 but instead joined Seishou's side with Type 64 after knowing their intentions of being in the fight.
(Italy) Arks
An Italian Beretta ARX160 assault rifle. Sister of both Betty and Itaru.
(United States) Rec
A student of Seishou, she is a Barrett REC7 assault rifle. Sister of Barrett and also her spotter who were both called in as support for the Hakone battle.

=== Battle/Sniper Rifle Class ===
Main characters of the Battle Rifle class. From left to right: Jeethree, Fal and Ichiyon.

(United Kingdom) / (Belgium) Fal (ふぁる, Faru)
Voiced by: Mina (Japanese); Shondra Marie (English)
Funco's elder sister. She is an English-made L1A1 battle rifle (named as FAL L1A1 in manga and anime, not to be confused with the original Belgian FN FAL). The natural leader of her class, Fal has it all: excellent grades, popularity, and beauty. In the manga, Fal is almost destroyed during the mission to rescue the Modern Literature Teacher from Red Steel High, and although the broken parts were replaced, the bolt, the part of her body containing all her previous memories, is still in possession of Akagane, which she uses as a leverage against Funco and the others. As it turns out, Funco has two sisters that are both, FALs. One follows the traditional pattern of metric measurement FN FAL being her original sister while the imperial measurement L1A1 "FAL" is Funco's guardian "sister".
(United States) Ichiyon (いちよん)
Voiced by: Saeko Zōgō (Japanese); Kara Greenberg (English)
Ichiroku's elder sister-in-law from the Springfield Armory family and Fal's roommate. She is an American M14 battle rifle (her name means "one" and "four"). She has a tomboyish personality: beautiful if she stays quiet, but she's often crude and rowdy. She has an ear for corny jokes, which she perceives as coming off silky smooth, but in reality have a husky delivery that annoys the other characters.
(Germany) Jeethree (じーすり, Jīsuri)
Voiced by: Mami Kosuge (Japanese); Chelsea Ryan McCurdy (English)
Jeethree is a German G3A3 battle rifle. Despite her strict appearance, she is actually very caring. She has many little sisters in the Submachine Class, and an effective but embarrassing posture that improves her full-auto shooting capability without worrying much about the recoil. Her sniping skill is top class, and she often wears dark pantyhose.
(Japan) Type 64
She is a Japanese Howa Type 64 battle rifle. Having a dignified air and usually seen in a kimono, she cannot leave Japan like her fellow rifle Type 89, for being exclusively designed for use of the JSDF.
(Italy) Itaru (イタル)
She is an Italian Beretta BM59 and the sister of Betty and Arks. Betrayed Seishou and shot Sig in order to delay their progress after being notified by Akagane that OSV is being brought into the battle to annihilate Seishou.
(United States) Barrett
A Barrett M82 anti-material rifle and sister of Rec. Called in as anti-material rifle support to take down the heavy sniper from Red Steel High by Emfour.

=== Submachine Gun Class ===
(Germany) Empi (えむぴ, Emupi)
Voiced by: Chika Horikawa (Japanese); Brittany Djie (English)
She is a German MP5A2 submachine gun and one of Jeethree's younger sisters. Despite Jeethree having several sisters, Empee seems to be the favorite one, owing to her as one of the most popular Submachine Gun. Also nicknamed Chithree (Chi for Chibi, a little Jeethree). Her elementary sisters family consists of MP5K, UMP45, MP7 (who happens to have the same vs Uzi rivalry towards FN P90, HK53)
(United States) Emten (えむてん, Emuten)
Voiced by: Ayumi Fujimura (Japanese); Brittany Deans (English)
She is an American MAC-10 (M-10) submachine gun. Similar to her namesake gun, she talks rapidly in one stroke, leaving her out of breath afterwards.
(Germany) Gossan (ごっさん)
Voiced by: Kayoko Tsumita (Japanese); Genevieve Simmons (English)
She is a German HK53 submachine gun (her name meaning "five" and "three"). As a submachine gun designed to fire intermediate rounds, she is much taller and looks much older than her classmates.
(Israel) Uzi (ウージー, Ūjī)
She is an Israeli Uzi submachine gun and Empi's self-proclaimed rival, referencing to the fact that the MP5 replaced the Uzi in many military and police applications.
(Austria) TMP
She is an Austrian Steyr TMP and Aug's younger sister. Due to being a stockless submachine gun, she has the habit of wearing no panties, and just like her older sister, she idolizes Funco.
(Finland) Jatimatic
She is a Finnish Jatimatic submachine gun and extremely obnoxious. Often wearing a pair of sunglasses as a homage to Marion Cobretti character in Cobra where the weapon gets its fame and even flips off Red Steel Academy's shooters despite being damaged herself during the battle at Hakone.

=== Red Steel High School ===
(Russia) Akagane
The leader of the Akaganekou Group. She is a Soviet / Russian AK-47. Also an ex-student of Gengoku.
(Russia) AKM
Co-leader of the Akaganekou Group. Vicious fighter with a no-nonsense attitude.
(Russia) Nanayon (ごっさん)
Voiced by: Ayahi Takagaki (Japanese); Margaret McDonald (English)
She is a Soviet / Russian AK-74 assault rifle, a school leader.
(Russia) AN-94/Akaban
She is a Russian AN-94 assault rifle, wounded by Sig at the Battle of Atami.
(Poland) Tantal
She is a Polish kbk wz. 88 Tantal assault rifle.
(China) Type 86 (86式自動步槍, 86 Shì Zìdòng Bùqiāng)
She is a full-auto version of the Chinese Type 86S rifle, wounded by Elle at the Battle of Atami.
(Russia) Saiga (サイガ)
Voiced by: Akemi Kanda (Japanese); Tiffany Grant (English)
She is a Russian Saiga-12K shotgun.
(Russia) RPK
Voiced by: Akeno Watanabe (Japanese); Brittany Deans (English)
She is a Soviet / Russian RPK light machine gun.
(Russia) Dragunov
She is a Soviet Dragunov SVD sniper rifle. Lost the long-range battle against Sig at the Hakone battle.
(Russia) Bizon
She is a Russian PP-19 submachine gun.
(Germany) HK32
She is a HK32 with cat ears and one of the sisters of Jeethree and the entire HK family. An outcast of the family due to the round she fires which is the Russian/Soviet 7.62x39mm. Joined Akaganekou but still harboring sisterly love with her original family.

=== Teachers ===
(United States) Modern Literature Teacher (現国, Genkoku)
Voiced by: Takayuki Kondo (Japanese); David Matranga (English)
The homeroom teacher for Funco and the others, and the only human character other than the Colonel at Red Steel High, whose real name and nationality is unknown at the start of the series. He was appointed to Seishou Academy unaware about the girls' nature. He often gets into misunderstandings with Funco (usually regarding her underwear), leaving him at the receiving end of her anger, but Funco cares about him and sometimes dreams about being chosen as his personal weapon. Later it is revealed that he is an American who is a descendant of John Moses Browning and despite not having any knowledge of firearms designing like his ancestor, he is kidnapped by the students of Red Steel High School for unknown reasons.
(Germany) Ms. Fujiko (ふじこ先生, Fujiko-sensei)
Voiced by: Yuu Asakawa (Japanese); Shelley Calene-Black (English)
A teacher of the Battle rifle class, she is a German FG 42 battle rifle. She has heterochromia and wears on eye patch on her right eye. Due to her usual appearance being similar to a World War II German Wehrmacht serviceman, more leaning to the Paratrooper division, even the Japanese Teacher did not recognize her when she removes her eyepatch and loosens her hair on one occasion.
(United States) Ms. Thompson (トンプソン先生, Tonpuson-sensei)
Voiced by: Sayaka Ohara (Japanese); Cynthia Martinez (English)
A teacher of the submachine gun class, she is an American M1928 Thompson submachine gun and a very easy-going personality. In the anime, it is noted that she speaks Japanese with a slight American accent. She is also photographed for the cover of specialized gun magazines. Revealed to have worked with the FBI by Suomi before joining Seishou as a teacher (the FBI used Thompson SMGs from the late 1920s to the 80s).
(United States) Headmaster Springfield (スプリングフィールド校長, Supuringufīrudo Kōchō)
Voiced by: Kenta Miyake (Japanese); Jovan Jackson (English)
The principal of Seishou Academy. He is a M1903 Springfield rifle and the only one who knew of Genkoku's ancestry when he started working at the school.
(United States) Professor Garand (ガーランド教官, Gārando Kyōkan)
Voiced by: Tōru Ōkawa (Japanese); Andrew Love (English)
The main instructor at Seishou Academy, usually seen as a World War II era USMC Drill Instructor. He is an M1 Garand rifle. He was one of the few people that knew the Human teacher's true name.
(Germany) Ms. Erma (エルマ先生, Eruma-sensei)
The teacher responsible for the submachine class' dorm. She is a German MP 40 submachine gun and is named after the shortage for Erfurter Maschinenfabrik, where the MP 40 was originally produced.
(France) Ms. Mire (ミレ先生, Mire-sensei)
Voiced by: Aya Endo
She is a French MAS 49 (Modèle 1949 or Mle 1949) rifle and she is a librarian.
(Switzerland) Ms. Eskay (エスケー先生, Esukē-sensei)
Voiced by: Fuyuka Oura (Japanese); Maggie Flecknoe (English)
The school nurse. She is a Swiss SIG SK 46 semi-automatic rifle, a successor to the bolt-action K31.
(Finland) Suomi
A teacher in the submachine gun class. He's a Finnish Suomi KP/-31 submachine gun. A spy and collaborator for Red Steel and no one could ever remember his name nor face (possibly to mock it being alike to the Russian PPsh) and was taken out by Ms. Thompson who caught on his act.
(Russia) Mossy
A teacher of Red Steel High, she's a Mosin-Nagant rifle and an acquaintance and friend of Ms. Thompson seemingly from their ties during WWII as both were from the Allied camp.

=== Others ===
(Germany) Shiiro
She is a Heckler & Koch HK416 who was called in by Ms. Fujiko to assist in the conflict in Hakone with Red Steel. Shown to be very stable when bipods deployed.
(Germany) PSG
An exchange student from Germany, she's a Heckler & Koch PSG1 sniper weapon system called in to assist in the battle against the Akagane Group at Hakone by Ms. Fujiko.

== Media ==
=== Manga ===
The original manga by Kitsune Tennouji began serialization in Kadokawa Shoten's Young Ace magazine from July 4, 2009, before moving over to Shōnen Ace from June 2011. To promote the manga, Kadokowa uploaded a short video on its YouTube account in June 2009.

A 4-Koma sideseries entitled "Upotte Nano" ran in 4-Koma Nano Ace from 2011 to 2013, when the magazine folded.

As of 2023, 14 volumes were published. Kitsune Tennouji previously disclosed on his Twitter account in July 2023 that the manga would end after the 17th volume.

=== Upotte!! Sisters ===
In October 2017, a new manga spin-off Upotte!! Sisters was uploaded on the Young Ace UP digital manga platform. The story follows the perspective of a super-tall (190 cm) Lisa Browning and super-chibi Julia when they transfer schools.

=== Anime ===
An original net animation series by Xebec was streamed on Nico Nico Douga and Crunchyroll between April 8, 2012, and June 9, 2012, also streaming on the Anime Network from May 9, 2012. A television broadcast of the series began on July 4, 2012, through TOKYO MX and other TV stations throughout Japan.

The opening theme is "I.N.G." by Iori Nomizu, Misuzu Togashi, Kaori Sadohara and Misato under name Sweet ARMS while the ending theme is "Calendar" (ひめくり, Himekuri) by Kaori Sadohara.

The anime was released in Japan with five Blu-Ray/DVD volumes from August to December 2012. The show has been licensed in North America by Sentai Filmworks.

A Blu-ray containing an extra episode of the anime series was bundled with limited editions of the fourth volume of the manga series, released on October 13, 2012. Sentai Filmworks later released the series on Blu-ray and DVD on March 18, 2014.

==== Episode list ====
No.	Title	Original release date
1	"Grip and Hold!" "Nigitte Tamotte" (にぎって たもって)	April 8, 2012
A Japanese man travels to Seishou Academy to begin his new job as a modern lit teacher. He soon learns that all the students are this school are humanized assault rifles trained to perfect their weaponry, and he soon finds himself hospitalized after getting on the wrong side of Funco.
2	"Go for it! Pass it!" "Kibatte Ukatte" (きばって うかって)	April 15, 2012
Funco, Ichiroku and Elle of the Assault Rifle Class are challenged to a battle by their seniors Fal and Ichiyon of the Battle Rifle Class.
3	"Wash and Scrub!" "Aratte Kosutte" (あらって こすって)	April 22, 2012
The Japanese Teacher finds out a bit more about Funco and the other assault rifles and battle rifles. Later, the assault rifles takes the submachine guns out for volunteer work, which brings up the subject of the sad history of L85A1.
4	"Sing! Compete!" "Utatte Kisotte" (うたって きそって)	April 29, 2012
The Annual Seishou Academy Team Battle is commencing soon, Ichiroku has a bone to pick with her partner Elle and is being menaced by the two new transfer students; the Kalashnikov-derived assault rifles, Sako and Galil, who are her main opponents in the Team Battle.
5	"Graze it! Beat it!!" "Kasutte Sakatte!!" (かすって さかって!!)	May 6, 2012
The team battle begins and Ichiroku advances to the final match by herself while Elle is convinced by Sig to remember their friendship and lend a hand to her. Sako shows her merciless and sadistic side while confronting Funco in the semi-finals, much to the anger of her friends.
6	"Take it! Hurry!" "Ubatte Asette" (うばって あせって)	May 13, 2012
To avenge Funco and Sig, Ichiroku and Elle have their face off against Sako and Galil in the final match. After the team battle ends, Funco's classmate Aug tries to overcome her shyness to get closer to her.
7	"Be Afraid! Visit!" "Burutte Mimatte" (ぶるって みまって)	May 20, 2012
Winter comes and Funco and her friends play together in the snow, leading to an accident that ends with the Japanese Teacher becoming sick at home. Funco pays a visit to him to help him get better.
8	"Take a Look! Scold Someone!" "Mawatte Shikatte" (まわって しかって)	May 27, 2012
The girls of the Assault Rifle class organize a maid café for the upcoming school festival. However, all their work is destroyed during a shootout between Ichiroku and her elder sister Ichiyon. When all hope seems lost, the Japanese Teacher encourages his students to work overnight to have everything ready in time.
9	"Burn Up! Go Mad!" "Moyatte Ikatte" (もやって いかって)	June 2, 2012
The girls go on a class trip to a coastal town. They spend the day playing on the beach, exploring the town and relaxing in the baths. While heading to the shops, Ichihachi, Galil and Jeethree's younger sister HK33E are mysteriously shot down. As Ichiroku deduces the assailants are targeting her, Funco and the Japanese teacher also come under attack, but are safe thanks to the arrival of the others. As the assailants leave behind a message, declaring a war against the Western guns will begin at midnight, several explosions occur around the town.
10	"And then! Upotte!" "Demotte Upotte" (でもって うぽって)	June 9, 2012
Funco, Ichiroku, Elle, and Sig accept the challenge and depart to confront the assailants. Sako, who was informed of the situation by Galil, appears to join them. The girls have a fierce fight throughout the city until Funco comes face to face with the enemy leader, the Nanayon. Genkoku tries to stand between them, but is shot by Nanayon, much to Funco's anger. However, Genkoku recovers from his wounds as guns can not truly harm anyone when not used by people. In the end, Nanayon and her crew decide to withdraw, vowing to return another day, and the girls get back to the academy along their beloved human teacher.
OVA	"Behold! Laugh!" "Miatte Waratte" (みあって わらって)	October 13, 2012
Funco, Ichiroku, Elle and Sig go on a camping trip in the mountains where they do some fishing in the river, smash a watermelon and relax in a hot spring. Later as the girls turn in for the night, Funco and Sig make a promise that they'll always be together.

== Reception ==
THEM Anime Reviews criticized the suspense of disbelief, arguing that the anthropomorphized schoolgirls firing their guns in Japan should be a concern by the police and the Japanese Self-Defense Forces.
