= Yui Kondo =

Japanese voice actress and singer

- 近藤 唯
- Born: 28 June 1988 (age 38); Kanagawa Prefecture, Japan
- Occupations: Voice actress; singer
- Years active: 2011–present
- Employer: Kenyu Office
- Notable work: Noucome as Furano Yukihira; Triage X as Mikoto Kiba; D.Gray-man Hallow as Road Camelot; Umamusume: Pretty Derby as Biwa Hayahide; The Idolmaster Million Live! as Karen Shinomiya; Pon no Michi as Riche Hayashi

Yui Kondo (Japanese: 近藤 唯, Hepburn: Kondō Yui; born 28 June 1988) is a Japanese voice actress and singer from Kanagawa Prefecture, affiliated with Kenyu Office. She is known for portraying Karen Shinomiya in The Idolmaster Million Live!, Furano Yukihira in Noucome, Mikoto Kiba in Triage X, Road Camelot in D.Gray-man Hallow, Biwa Hayahide in Umamusume: Pretty Derby, and Riche Hayashi in Pon no Michi.

== Biography ==
Yui Kondo was born on 28 June 1988 in Kanagawa Prefecture. She became interested in voice acting during her later years in elementary school, and she originally planned to enter a voice acting training school after junior high school, but her parents encouraged her to go on to high school.

During high school, Kondo first participated in a trial enrollment at the Nihon Kogakuin College Voice Acting and Acting Department, and she later enrolled in the school in 2007. She appeared as a Dream Challenger on Dream Dream Party, Akira Kamiya and Megumi Toyoguchi's radio show on Nippon Cultural Broadcasting, but sat out of their graduation episode due to ill health. She passed an agency audition shortly before her graduation, and she joined Kenyu Office.

In August 2013, Kondo was cast as Furano Yukihira in Noucome. In November 2014, she was cast as Freya Schwertleite in Kadenz Fermata Akkord: Fortissimo. In December 2014, she was cast as Mikoto Kiba in Triage X. In March 2015, she was cast as Kuon Glamred Stroheim in Xblaze Lost: Memories. In October 2015, she was cast as Corneria in Atelier Sophie: The Alchemist of the Mysterious Book. In March 2016, she was cast as Road Camelot in D.Gray-man Hallow. In July 2017, she was cast as Biwa Hayahide in the Umamusume: Pretty Derby multimedia franchise, and she reprised her role in the 2018 anime adaptation. In June 2019, she was cast as Tao Mongarten in Atelier Ryza: Ever Darkness & the Secret Hideout. In August 2023, she was cast as Riche Hayashi in Pon no Michi.

Kondou voices Karen Shinomiya in The Idolmaster Million Live!, a spin-off of The Idolmaster franchise. As part of the franchise, she performed as part of a quartet in the 2013 single "The Idolmaster Million Live Theater Performance 07" (which charted at #5 in the Oricon Singles Chart). She reprised the role in Million Live's 2023 anime adaptation.

== Filmography ==
=== Animated television ===
| Year | Series | Role | Ref. |
|---|---|---|---|
| 2011 | Level E | Satomi | |
| 2013 | Noucome | Furano Yukihira | |
| 2014 | Baby Steps | Masumi Makihara | |
| 2014 | Brynhildr in the Darkness | Akane | |
| 2015 | Beautiful Bones: Sakurako's Investigation | Minami Tsutsumi | |
| 2015 | Cardfight!! Vanguard G | Rin Hashima | |
| 2015 | Triage X | Mikoto Kiba | |
| 2016 | D.Gray-man Hallow | Road Camelot | |
| 2017 | All Out!! | Miki Ikuta | |
| 2017 | Idol Incidents | Yuina Amamiya | |
| 2018 | Inazuma Eleven: Ares | Mizuho Kaname, Xiao Lau | |
| 2018 | Puzzle & Dragons X | Maru | |
| 2018 | Umamusume: Pretty Derby | Biwa Hayahide | |
| 2019 | Star Twinkle PreCure | Touma Amamiya | |
| 2023 | The Idolmaster Million Live! | Karen Shinomiya | |
| 2024 | Pon no Michi | Riche Hayashi | |
| 2025 | Sword of the Demon Hunter: Kijin Gentōshō | Tōmi no Kijo | |

=== Original net animation ===
| Year | Series | Role | Ref. |
|---|---|---|---|
| 2021 | JoJo's Bizarre Adventure: Stone Ocean | Miraschon, Female Prisoner A | |

=== Video games ===
| Year | Series | Role | Ref. |
|---|---|---|---|
| 2012 | Toy Wars | Akane Kaidō | |
| 2013 | The Idolmaster Million Live! | Karen Shinomiya | |
| 2014 | Kadenz Fermata Akkord: Fortissimo | Freya Schwertleite | |
| 2015 | Atelier Sophie: The Alchemist of the Mysterious Book | Corneria | |
| 2015 | Shōjo to Dragon: Genjuu Keiyaku Cryptract | Astaroth, Laplace, Kugai, etc. | |
| 2015 | White Cat Project | Chihaya, Parvane | |
| 2015 | Xblaze Lost: Memories | Kuon Glamred Stroheim | |
| 2016 | Dragon Quest VIII | Kira | |
| 2016 | Puyopuyo!! Quest | Lilian, Katia | |
| 2017 | Valkyrie Anatomia | Peppo | |
| 2019 | 100% Orange Juice! | Nath | |
| 2019 | Apex Legends | Wattson | |
| 2019 | Atelier Lulua: The Scion of Arland | Mana | |
| 2019 | Atelier Ryza: Ever Darkness & the Secret Hideout | Tao Mongarten | |
| 2019 | Bustafellows | Teuta | |
| 2021 | Lost Judgment | Sayaka Nishizono | |
| 2021 | Umamusume: Pretty Derby | Biwa Hayahide | |
| 2022 | Monster Hunter Riders | Laila, Katerina | |
| 2024 | Super Monkey Ball Banana Rumble | Baby | |
| 2024 | Honkai Impact 3rd | Helia | |
| 2026 | Fatal Frame II: Crimson Butterfly Remake | Mio Amakura | |

=== Dubbing ===
- The Half of It (Aster Flores (Alexxis Lemire))
- Marriage Contract (Kang Hye-soo (Uee))
