= Isuca =

Japanese manga and anime series

- Cover of the first manga volume featuring Sakuya Shimazu.

イスカ (Isuka)
- Genre: Dark fantasy, harem, supernatural
- Manga
- Written by: Osamu Takahashi
- Published by: Kadokawa Shoten
- Magazine: Young Ace
- Original run: July 4, 2009 – April 2017
- Volumes: 9
- Anime television series
- Directed by: Akira Iwanaga
- Produced by: Takeshi Yasuda; Gomi Kenjiro
- Written by: Masashi Suzuki
- Music by: Naoki Chiba; RUKA; Susumu Akizuki
- Studio: Arms
- Licensed by: AUS: Madman Entertainment; NA: Crunchyroll (streaming) Discotek Media (home video)
- Original network: Tokyo MX, AT-X, BS11, TV Saitama, CTC, tvk, Sun TV, TVQ, GBS
- Original run: January 24, 2015 – March 28, 2015
- Episodes: 10 + OVA

Isuca (Japanese: イスカ, Hepburn: Isuka) is a Japanese manga series by Osamu Takahashi. It was serialized in Kadokawa Shoten's magazine Young Ace from July 2009 to April 2017 and has been collected into nine tankōbon volumes. An anime adaptation by Arms aired in Japan between January and March 2015.

== Plot ==
The story revolves around Shinichirō, a male student who gets a job as a housekeeper in order to pay his rent. When he unintentionally releases a strange creature into the world he learns that his female employer, named Sakuya Shimizu, is the head of the Shimizu clan that hunts these creatures. Shinichirō cooperates with her to hunt down the monsters that are running loose.

== Characters ==
=== Main characters ===
Shinichirō Asano (浅野 真一郎, Asano Shin'ichirō)
Voiced by: Keisuke Koumoto
Shinichirō appears to be an average high-school student but he has an unusual ability: the Eyes of Truth, which allows him to divine the True Name of a supernatural being or person with supernatural powers when he kisses them. Since the first person to speak an individual's true name gains the ability to compel said individual to do whatever he wants (within reason), he becomes a powerful ally in Sakuya's work. Unfortunately, he learns and speaks Sakuya's true name, leaving her unable to disobey him. Originally, he lived alone in his parents' apartment, since they had gone to Europe for job training (in the manga, his father is a bad stage magician and his mother his father's assistant),^{[ch. 1]} but later was moved into Sakuya's house (ostensibly as her housekeeper) after they began working together. He becomes the wielder of the spirit sword Yashaou after learning its True Name when it possessed Sakuya and used her to nearly kill him.^{[ch. 4]}
Sakuya Shimazu (島津 朔邪, Shimazu Sakuya)
Voiced by: Ibuki Kido
Sakuya is the de facto or provisional 37th head of the Shimazu Family, but is in a power struggle with her younger cousin for the position. She wishes to become head of the family in order to find out what happened to her parents several years before the present. Her family is tasked with sealing monsters and spirits that cross over into this world but, unlike many in her family, does not believe that the ends justify the means and tries to keep collateral damage to a minimum. She uses a bow and arrow with several spiritual attacks in combat and, when charged-up by Shinichirō, those attacks are amplified ten-fold. At first she is reluctant to do so since it involves kissing him, but over time she comes to have feelings for him. Although she maintains a haughty attitude, her facade hides a young lady who just wants to live like a normal person. When Shinichirō discovers her True Name, she becomes unable to disobey any of his orders.^{[ch. 7]} In order to save face and avoid losing her position in the family, she forces Shinichirō to become her fiancé, if only in name. This twist is omitted from the anime, but is hinted at by Nami Shimazu, Sakuya's grandmother, when she calls Shinichrō "Mr. Husband". Her True Name is Isuca, a name she chose after a plush bird toy given to her by her father; the Isuca is supposed to bring luck and prevent illness. Her weakness is a fear of rats and roaches.^{[ch. 11]}
Suseri Shimazu (島津 須世璃, Shimazu Suseri)
Voiced by: M·A·O
Suseri is Sakuya's cousin who is in the running to be the next head of the Shimazu family. She specializes in spirit summoning and wind magic. In the beginning, she seems somewhat emotionless and focused on only becoming the next head. She even tries to increase her chances of becoming the next head by attempting to steal Shinichirō away from Sakuya; an attempt by Suseri to discover Sakuya's True Name by using Shinichirō's Eyes of Truth went wrong when Shinichirō spoke Sakuya's True Name first.^{[ch. 7]} She later transfers to the same school as Sakuya not only to steal Shinichirō away but to also investigate the appearance of so many specters at the school. As time passes, she begins to develop feelings for Shinichirō. Because she is envious and secretly admires her older cousin, Suseri chooses her True Name to be Sakuya.

=== Supporting characters ===
Tamako (タマ子)
Voiced by: Kaori Sadohara
A two-tailed cat-spirit with red hair and a large bosom. She can change into a giant cat form and is the first spirit whom Shinichiro meets; in the manga, she can also assume the form of a normal-sized cat. He learns her true name when she kisses him as thanks for saving her from Sakuya (in the anime, this happens after he clears her from suspicion of a lightning beast attack). Her True Name is Tama, but at her request Shinichirō gives her the name Tamako in order to disguise her True Name. Like most spirits she needs life energy to survive, though she has never attacked anyone. True to her cat-like nature, she licks Shinichirō in affection, likes to curl up in his lap and tends to eat her meals on the floor. She also has a disturbing tendency of catching prey and bringing it to him.
Nadeshiko Sōma (相馬 撫子, Sōma Nadeshiko)
Voiced by: Saeko Zōgō
Shinichirō and Sakuya's homeroom teacher at the high school that they attend. She has a connection with the Shimazu Family, has been appointed by the Shimazu Family as the guardian of both Sakuya and Suseri ^{[ch. 6]} and helps to clean up the messes left behind Sakuya's work. She is also responsible for getting Shinichirō his job as Sakuya's housekeeper; later, she has Shinichirō moved into Sakuya's house as part of the plan to have them pose as intending to marry and moves in as well to both keep an eye on them and to investigate Shinichirō's True Name.^{[ch. 9]} Although she helps Sakuya, Nadeshiko supports Suseri as the next head of the family, and she loves stirring the pot now and then by flirting with Shinichirō or suggesting to the other girls ways to get closer to Shinichirō in order to make life at Sakuya's mansion interesting.
Nami Shimazu (島津那巳)
Voiced by: Ikue Ōtani
Nami is the grandmother of Sakuya and Suseri and head of the Shimazu Family. Despite her age, she maintains the image of a young girl through the use of an artificial body created by Nadeshiko and loves to play video games. She is intrigued by Shinichirō's powers as a magan and declares that the next head of the family must marry him. When her powers to control the artificial body fades, she entrusts a jewel containing great spiritual powers to Shinichirō in hopes that he can find a way to seal it. Nami had a previous encounter with the homunculus Isuca, which is the basis of Isuca's grudge against the Shimazu family.
Matsuri Sōma (相馬 茉莉, Sōma Matsuri)
Voiced by: Akane Kohinata
Matsuri is Suseri's attendant and assistant. She also specializes in healing spells to lower collateral damage to innocent bystanders from battles with specters.
Isuca (イスカ, Isuka)
Voiced by: Ayumi Fujimura
Isuca holds a grudge against the Shimazu family but seems to be focusing mainly on Sakuya. However, she doesn't want to kill her immediately: she first wants to torment Sakuya by killing the people closest to her until she has given in to despair and only then will she kill her. She is revealed to be a homunculus from the Asahina family, a rival family of magic users. It is not revealed why her name is the same as Sakuya's True Name, but at the end of the anime it is shown that Sakuya's father may be involved too.

== Media ==
=== Manga ===
No.	Release date	ISBN
1	May 21, 2010	978-4-04-715458-2
2	February 23, 2011	978-4-04-715625-8
3	November 21, 2012	978-4-04-120502-0
4	August 22, 2013	978-4-04-120851-9
5	June 26, 2014	978-4-04-102025-8
6	December 29, 2014	978-4-04-102026-5
7	September 4, 2015	978-4-04-102803-2
8	October 4, 2016	978-4-04-104418-6
9	May 2, 2017	978-4-04-105464-2

=== Anime ===
The opening song theme for the anime was "Never say Never" by Afilia Saga, while the ending song theme was "Somebody to Love" by TWO-FORMULA, a duo consisted of the singers and voice actresses Saeko Zōgō and Kaori Sadohara.

No.	Title	Original air date
1	"Chance Meeting"; Transliteration: "Kaikō" (Japanese: 邂逅)	January 24, 2015
Shinichirō Asano, living by himself and jobless, finds himself thrust into a strange and dangerous world of magic and specters after he is first saved from a centipede specter by Sakuya Shimazu, then must help her face a lightning beast.
2	"True Name"; Transliteration: "Mana" (Japanese: 真名)	January 31, 2015
When Shinichiro learns and speaks her True Name, cat-girl Tama becomes his servant, much to Sakuya's displeasure; then he and Sakuya must then deal with an infestation of rat specters in their school. Shinichiro becomes Sakuya's housekeeper and gives Tama the name "Tamako".
3	"Confrontation"; Transliteration: "Tairitsu" (Japanese: 対立)	February 7, 2015
Shinichiro is moved into Sakuya's house. Sakuya's cousin Suseri shows up with her assistant Matsuri and shows an interest in Shinichiro in more ways than one, leaving Shinichiro in the middle of Sakuya and Suseri's battle to be head of the Shimazu Family. Suseri's abducting Shinichiro becomes secondary when they all become trapped in another dimension and must face specter cars.
4	"Shadow Play"; Transliteration: "An'yaku" (Japanese: 暗躍)	February 14, 2015
Murderous specters may seem like small potatoes compared to Suseri's transferring into Shinichiro and Sakuya's school. However, there may be more to Suseri's presence than at first glance, including the fact that a samurai golem is on the loose with a sword containing a murderous specter and that the opening of so many magical gates is for some reason putting Sakuya under suspicion.
5	"Eye of Truth"; Transliteration: "Shingan" (Japanese: 真眼)	February 21, 2015
Sakuya is upset by the fact that special investigative teams have been sent by the Shimazu Family to infiltrate the school and who are being picked off one by one by a wall specter summoned by the Western Mage, and even more because Shinichiro can access True Names through kissing, which means he can learn her True Name!
6	"Promise"; Transliteration: "Yakusoku" (Japanese: 約束)	February 28, 2015
Shinichiro's life has become more complicated now that he knows Sakuya's True Name because his knowledge may cause Sakuya to be exiled from her Family. While the Shimazu clan debates Sakuya's future, Shinichiro tries to rebuild his relationship with her. Sakuya finally opens up to him and tells him about her parents (especially her father, who was a Western Mage) and about the situation within the Shimazu Family that caused her to leave. A mysterious mirror arrives but turns out to be a magical trap, and Shinichiro and Sakuya must defeat the specter inside the mirror in order to return, but it's using Sakuya's negative feelings against her.
7	"Light and Dark"; Transliteration: "Meian" (Japanese: 明暗)	March 7, 2015
Life in the Shimazu house is back to its usual ridiculous routine, but the new closeness between Shinichiro and Sakuya causes some complications. Shinichiro takes possession of the sword whose True Name he learned earlier, and just in time to help Sakuya and the team face a smoke specter in a subway tunnel. While Sakuya and the other fight to revive a fallen Shinichiro, Suseri battles the Western Mage, but is defeated. Enraged, Sakuya uses her ultimate technique to bring down the Western Mage (who calls herself "Isuca"), but at a terrible cost to herself.
8	"Trials"; Transliteration: "Shiren" (Japanese: 試練)	March 14, 2015
Sakuya is in a coma, due to her terrific expenditure of spiritual energy, and Shinichiro is the only one who can bring her out of it. Over the objections of Suseri's mother Sagiri (who is extremely ambitious to have her daughter declared Family Head), Sakuya's grandmother decrees that Sakuya will not be punished. Suseri accompanies Shinichiro on a shopping expedition and gets a taste of ordinary life...something she's never experienced before and which everyone else mistakes for a date! Later, Suseri attempts a rite of exorcism against a lightning specter on her own to heighten her powers, but when it goes wrong Shinichiro demands to be allowed to assist her; it is allowed, but on the condition that Shinichiro and Suseri must do it alone. With Shinichiro's help, Suseri both tames the lightning specter and discovers her own path.
9	"Attack"; Transliteration: "Shūgeki" (Japanese: 襲撃)	March 21, 2015
Isuca is healing from her battle with Sakuya, but her anger and hatred are even fiercer than before. Various shrines, temples and churches are being destroyed by an unknown male Mage to weaken the area's spiritual energy, and Sakuya's reaction worries Shinichiro. A plan to protect the last spiritual energy stronghold fails. Shinichiro meets Nami, Sakuya's grandmother, who is both not quite as and much more than she appears to be, and learns about both the Asahina Family, the Shimazu Family's greatest rival and Sakuya's father's family, and Isuca's origins. Shinichiro is given a choice about his future and Isuca makes her boldest and most vicious attack yet.
10	"Resolution"; Transliteration: "Ketchaku" (Japanese: 決着)	March 28, 2015
Sakuya barely escapes Isuca's killing move with some last-second help from Shinichiro. The others battles the giant snake specter and by combining their powers destroy it, while Shinichiro and Sakuya battle Isuca, whose hatred is spiraling out of control and causes the mansion to burn. When Shinichiro and Sakuya reveal their true feelings for each other, Shinichiro gives Sakuya enough spiritual power to smash through Isuca's defenses and eventually defeat her.
11 (OVA)	"Paradise"; Transliteration: "Gokuraku" (Japanese: 極楽)	August 26, 2015
Shinichiro, Sakuya, the gang and Nami travel to an island, but the combination of sun, surf, swimsuits and the misadventures that come with them mean things may get out of hand. When members of the party start disappearing one by one, things are DEFINITELY getting out of hand!

== Reception ==
Allen Moody of THEM Anime Reviews wrote that the show had "more nudity (and less plot) than many H shows", and there was a lot of censored nudity in the Crunchyroll version such as a bath scene that "looks like an explosion in a White-Out factory" and "it seems like a black spot over the villainess' chest was an actual feature of her anatomy." He also wrote that the "continuity errors in a cartoon are just shameful." Chris Beveridge of The Fandom Post stated that "this might have been a decent six episode OVA series twenty years ago, but today it's just one more brick in the wall of bland stories with milquetoast characters and nothing compelling to say". Theron Martin of Anime News Network called it a cross between Shakugan no Shana and Kekkaishi but with a lot more harem elements. He thought that the sense of timing was poor with characters talking too much during critical battle scenes, and the fanservice being pushed too hard in some places. On the positive side, the music and sound were appreciable.

The theme song "Somebody to Love" by Two-Formula reached number 135 on the Oricon charts.

== Notes ==
- "Ch." is shortened form for chapter and refers to a chapter number of the Isuca manga
- "Ep." is shortened form for episode and refers to an episode number of the Isuca anime
