= Kaori Sadohara =

Japanese voice actress and singer

- 佐土原 かおり
- Born: January 18, 1988 (age 38); Uozu, Toyama Prefecture, Japan
- Occupations: Voice actress; singer
- Years active: 2000–present
- Height: 158 cm (5 ft 2 in)
- Spouse: Yoshihisa Kawahara (m. 2017)

Kaori Sadohara (佐土原 かおり, Sadohara Kaori; born January 18, 1988) is a Japanese voice actress and singer. One of her most notable roles was Chocolat in Noucome.

== Filmography ==
=== Anime ===
- Upotte!! – Sig
- Noucome – Chocolat
- Amagi Brilliant Park – Chiba
- Date A Live – Tamae Okamine
- R-15 – Kiya Star
- Mondaiji-tachi ga Isekai kara Kuru Sou Desu yo? – Sandra Dortlake
- Isuca – Tamako
- Nichijou – Haruna Annaka
- Sakura Trick – Ikeno Sister, Yukako Mochida
- Hitsugi no Chaika – Julia

=== Video games ===
- Suzumiya Haruhi No Tsuisou
- Atelier Ayesha: The Alchemist of Dusk
- Idol Jihen
- Crusaders Quest – Kronos
- Date A Live Twin Edition Rio Reencarnation – Tamae Okamine
- MapleStory – Nero, announcer
