= Sarah Emi Bridcutt =

Japanese voice actress (born 1989)

- ブリドカット セーラ 恵美
- Born: February 5, 1989 (age 37); Iwaki, Fukushima, Japan
- Education: Nihon University
- Occupation: Voice actress
- Years active: 2011–present
- Agent: EARLY WING
- Notable work: The Testament of Sister New Devil as Yuki Nonaka; Blood Lad as Hydra Bell; The Rising of the Shield Hero as Myne; Starlink: Battle for Atlas as Chase da Silva; Kantai Collection as Yūbari; Monster Girl Doctor as Tisalia Scythia; Fatal Fury and The King of Fighters series as Blue Mary; Fate/Grand Order as Salome; Date A Live as Yuzuru Yamai
- Height: 167 cm (5 ft 6 in)

Sarah Emi Bridcutt (ブリドカット セーラ 恵美, Buridokatto Sēra Emi) is a Japanese-Australian voice actress from Iwaki, Fukushima. She was previously affiliated with Production Ace.

== Biography ==
Bridcutt was born to a Japanese mother and Australian father. In the first grade of elementary school, she saw Detective Conan and admired Minami Takayama, who played Conan Edogawa, then deciding to become a voice actress. She started acting in high school and, after graduating, Bridcutt entered the Theater Department at Nihon University College of Art. She became a scholarship student when she was in her third year of college and began attending the Production Ace Acting Research Institute. When asked about her day in the life of a voice actress by Crunchyroll, she said: "It's a little complicated. It depends on the day. Some days I work from 10:00 to 3:00, other days it'll be 4:00 to 9:00, sometimes I have to work all day long."

Bridcutt is a fan and player of Dead or Alive Xtreme Venus Vacation and would appear as a guest for the game's regular livestreams before becoming an official host herself. In mid 2025, she was given the role of the character Azusa.

== Filmography ==
=== Anime ===
2013

- Problem Children are Coming from Another World, aren't they? (Asuka Kudō)
- Red Data Girl (Jean Honoka Kisaragi)
- Majestic Prince (Shion Natori)
- Fate/kaleid liner Prisma Illya (Magical Bushidō Musashi)
- Blood Lad (Bell Hydra)

2014

- Chaika - The Coffin Princess (Selma Kenworth)
- Dai-Shogun - Great Revolution (Hijikata Toshizō)
- Date A Live II (Yuzuru Yamai)
- Pri Para (Eiko)

2015

- Aria the Scarlet Ammo AA (Urara Takachiho)
- Isuca (Kanae)
- Kantai Collection (Yūbari)
- The Testament of Sister New Devil (Yuki Nonaka)
- Yu-Gi-Oh! Arc-V (Rin)

2016

- Haruchika (Chika Homura)
- Ange Vierge (Nya Lapucea)

2017

- Chaos;Child (Nono Kurusu)
- Two Car (Chiyuki Shiohara)

2019

- The Rising of the Shield Hero (Myne)
- Date A Live III (Yuzuru Yamai)
- Hulaing Babies (Nagisa)

2020

- ID - Invaded (Sarina Togo)
- Hulaing Babies☆Petit (Nagisa)
- Monster Girl Doctor (Tisalia Scythia)

2021

- Cells at Work! Code Black (Liver Cell)
- Redo of Healer (Myrrh)
- Komi Can't Communicate (Akako Onigashima)

2022

- Date A Live IV (Yuzuru Yamai)
- The Rising of the Shield Hero Season 2 (Myne)

2023

- Classroom for Heroes (Maria/Mao)
- The Legend of Heroes: Trails of Cold Steel – Northern War (Iseria Frost)

2027

- In a World Full of Zombies I'm the Only One Who Doesn't Get Attacked (Kiriko Ogura)

=== Films ===
2019

- Grisaia: Phantom Trigger the Animation (Choco & Vanilla Inagaki)

=== Video games ===
2013

- Kantai Collection (Hatsukaze, Kumano, Maikaze, Suzuya, Yūbari)

2015

- Gothic wa Mahou Otome (Lily)
- Disgaea 5: Alliance of Vengeance (Seraphina)
- Shironeko Project (Carolyn Gambit)

2018

- The King of Fighters XIV (Blue Mary)
- The King of Fighters All Star (Blue Mary)

2019

- Fate/Grand Order (Salome)
- Starlink: Battle for Atlas (Chase da Silva)
- Touhou LostWord (Meiling Hong)

2020

- Fire Emblem: Three Houses (Cindered Shadows (DLC) (Constance))
- Grimms Notes (Jagd-Hund)

2021

- Gate of Nightmares (Beatrix, Serena)

2022

- The King of Fighters XV (Blue Mary)
- Trek to Yomi (Aiko)

2024

- A Certain Magical Index: Imaginary Fest (Cendrillon)
- Street Fighter 6 (Blue Mary)

2025

- Fatal Fury: City of the Wolves (Blue Mary)
- Dead or Alive Xtreme Venus Vacation (Azusa)
- Azur Lane (Yuzuru Yamai)

=== Dubbing ===
==== Live-action ====
- American Horror Story: Murder House (Violet Harmon (Taissa Farmiga))
- Bizaardvark (Amelia Duckworth (DeVore Ledridge))
- Black Christmas (Marty (Lily Donoghue))
- Blood Father (Lydia Link (Erin Moriarty))
- Celeste and Jesse Forever (Riley Banks (Emma Roberts))
- Death Wish (Jordan Kersey (Camila Morrone))
- Happiest Season (Harper (Mackenzie Davis))
- High Strung (Jazzy (Sonoya Mizuno))
- The Last Duel (Marguerite de Carrouges (Jodie Comer))
- L.M. Montgomery's Anne of Green Gables (Josie Pye (Stefani Kimber))
- The Missing (Alice Webster (Abigail Hardingham))
- Twixt (Virginia "V" (Elle Fanning))

==== Animation ====
- Casper's Scare School (Monaco)
- Sofia the First (Princess Cleo)
