= TVQ Kyushu Broadcasting =

Television station in Kyushu, Japan

JOTY-DTV
- Logo used since 2019

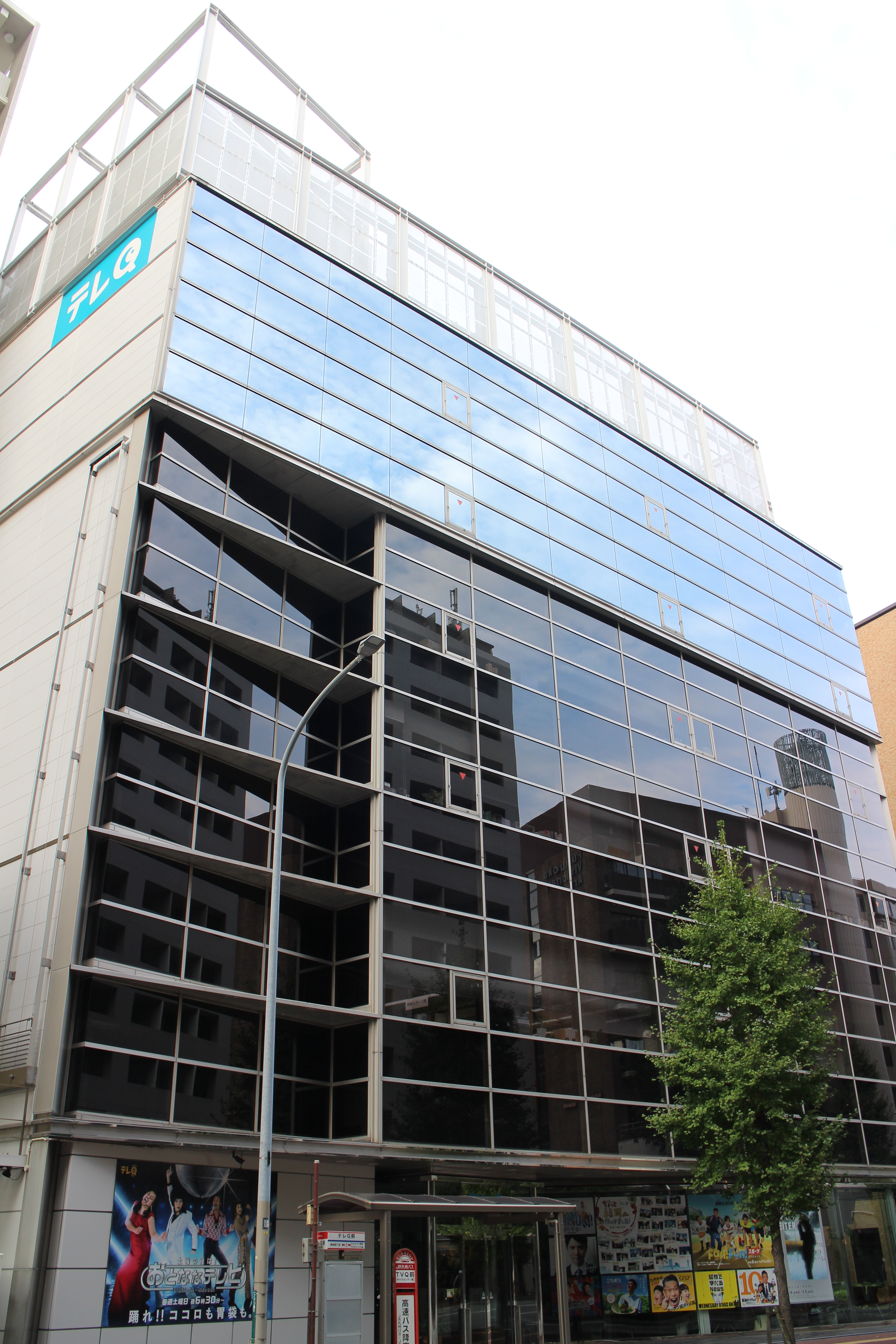
- Headquarters in Hakata-ku, Fukuoka
- Fukuoka Prefecture; Japan
- City: Fukuoka
- Channels: Digital: 26 (UHF); Virtual: 7
- Branding: TVQ Kyushu

Programming
- Language: Japanese
- Affiliations: TX Network

Ownership
- Owner: TVQ Kyushu Broadcasting Co., Ltd.

History
- Founded: September 1, 1990
- First air date: April 1, 1991
- Former call signs: JOTY-TV (1991–2011)
- Former names: TXN Kyushu (1991–2001)
- Former channel numbers: Analog: 19 (UHF; 1991–2011)

Technical information
- Licensing authority: MIC

Links
- Website: www.tvq.co.jp/

TVQ Kyushu Broadcasting Co., Ltd. (株式会社TVQ九州放送, Kabushikigaisha TVQ Kyūshū Hōsō; TVQ), callsign JOTY-DTV (channel 7) is a Japanese television station based in Fukuoka that serves as the affiliate of the TX Network for the Fukuoka Prefecture.

== Overview ==
TVQ was the fifth station to launch in Fukuoka, and the sixth affiliate with the TX Network. There were the last stations to launch in the markets.

It is customary for TX Network affiliates to use TV + region name, as in TV Hokkaido, TV Aichi, TV Osaka, and TV Setouchi. During the time of its establishment, the company was named as "TXN Kyushu" because the name "TV Kyushu", which the owner intended to use, was already registered as the company name of a cable TV station in Saga Prefecture. Since then, the nickname of the company is Tele Q (テレQ, Tere kyū). In January 2001, the name of the company was changed to the current one, though retaining its nickname.

This is one of the two only television stations to have "Q" in its name, the other being Ryukyu Asahi Broadcasting.

== History ==
TVQ's former logo, used from April 1, 1991 to April 1, 2019

In June 1986, Nikkei and TV Tokyo showed interest in establishing a TV station in Fukuoka, in order to achieve coverage throughout the Japanese archipelago. After entering into an agreement with the Nishinippon Shimbun, local political and business circles, Nikkei and TV Tokyo solicited the creation of a TV license in Fukuoka Prefecture in March 1989. No less than 235 companies applied for the license. With the help of local business circles, these companies agreed to merge with Nikkei's bid.

In addition to merging other candidate groups, the location and name of the headquarters were the two main issues that Nikkei faced. At the time, the four existing commercial television stations were headquartered in Fukuoka, the largest city, and had supplementary offices in Kitakyushu, second largest city. The latter launched a campaign with 105 bids. After requests from the mayor of Kitakyushu, Nikkei agreed that the station would be headquartered in both Fukuoka and Kitakyushu. The initial name of the station was intended to be TV Kyushu (テレビ九州), however, since there already was a cable company in Saga Prefecture with that name, the corporate name became (TXN九州), keeping the intended TVQ abbreviation. On June 18, 1990, TXN Kyushu obtained its broadcasting license and held its founding meeting on August 31. At the same time, Nikkei built the Nikkei Western Media Hall with seven floors (one below ground and six above), with a total area of 5,803 square meters, as TXN Kyushu's headquarters.

TXN Kyushu made its test broadcasts on March 25, 1991; at 5:52am on April 1, broadcasts began. In tandem with its launch, the station selected TVQ as its abbreviation, among 6328 proposals. From November 16 to 22, 1992, TVQ's ratings finally hit the double digits (10%) for the first time during prime time. In the same year, its Kitakyushu headquarters moved from the Kogura Asahi Mitsui Building to the Nikkei Kitakyushu Media Hall, a building with six floors (one below ground and five above), with a total size of 1,500 square meters. TVQ used the first and second floors for its local studios, totalling 900 square meters.

In 1993, TVQ broadcast the 1994 FIFA World Cup qualifying match between Japan and Iraq, attracting a record high of 38.3%. During the second semester of 1993 alone, the average primetime audience reached a record of 8.7%. That year, it received a record profit of 206 million yen, earning a profit for the first time since launch. For its fifth anniversary in 1996, it held several special events, such as the Asian Music Festival; that year, the TVQ labor union was established. On October 10, 1997, it became one of the first television stations in Fukuoka to launch its official website. In 1999, it paid a dividend of 1,5 billion yen, the first dividends it paid since launch..

In 2000, its revenue surpassed the seven billion yen mark for the first time. The company's name was changed to TVQ Kyushu Broadcasting (TVQ九州放送) on January 1, 2001, in order to highlight the company's core business. On April 1, it aired a six-hour special program for its tenth anniversary. That year, it began strengthening its international co-operation with the documentary Sun Yat-sen and Shōkichi Umeya, co-produced with Zhejiang Television. A second partnership followed in 2006 with Kwangju Broadcasting, an SBS affiliate.

On November 15, 2005, TVQ obtained da digital terrestrial license and announced channel 7 as its logical channel number. Digital broadcasts began on July 1, 2006, alongside RKB, TNC and FBS. The analog signal shut down on July 24, 2011. That same year, it held a Van Gogh exhibit at the Kyushu National Museum, attracting over 350,000 visitors. Other exhibitions that year included the ukiyo-e Daihokusai Exhibition and the Hamburg Ukiyo-e Collection Exhibition in Fukuoka, and a Monet exhibition in Kitakyushu. These were all well received by locals.

On April 1, 2019, TVQ changed its logo, adopting the name Tele Q (テレQ).
