= Animelo Summer Live =

Anime songs music festival

- Genre: Anime music
- Dates: Late August (2026 edition to be held in July)
- Locations: Yoyogi National Gymnasium (2005); Nippon Budokan (2006–2007); Saitama Super Arena (2008–2019, 2021–2025); Makuhari Messe (2026); GMO Arena Saitama (2027–present)
- Years active: 2005–present
- Attendance: 87,000 (2025)
- Website: http://anisama.tv/

Animelo Summer Live is the biggest annual anime song music festival in Japan hosted by Dwango and Nippon Cultural Broadcasting. Animelo Summer Live has been held every summer since 2005.

== Description ==
Animelo performers are singers and voice actors that specialize in singing anime or game theme songs; however, they also both present and perform new original and tokusatsu songs as well. The performers are not necessarily under the same record label. Animelo has a different theme song for each year, which is sung by all performers in the end of the concert.

More general artists who have performed anime songs have also performed, including Rina Aiuchi, m.o.v.e, AAA, Shoko Nakagawa, Kenji Ohtsuki, Gackt, and Momoiro Clover Z. Due to various copyrights and contracts, some performances belonging to certain record labels have sometimes not been included on the video distributed on DVDs and Blu-Rays. This factored into the lack of a video release for 2005.

Because all music is played live, performs often appear with their band or dancers. Performers who do not have a band appear with a selected "Anisama band."

Starting with Anisama Girl's Night in 2010, there have been many spinoff Animelo events.

The sponsors of the event have been Dwango, Nippon Cultural Broadcasting, Good Smile Company, and Bushiroad.

=== Main Event ===
Year	Date	Title	Location	Sponsored
2005	July 10	Animelo Summer Live 2005 -THE BRIDGE-	Yoyogi National Gymnasium	Bellwood Records, evolution, Geneon, Giza Studio, King Records, Lantis, Pony Canyon, Realize Records
2006	July 8	Animelo Summer Live 2006 -OUTRIDE-	Nippon Budokan	Avex Trax, Bellwood Records, evolution, Geneon, Giza Studio, King Records, Lantis, On The Run, Realize Records, Victor Entertainment
2007	July 7	Animelo Summer Live 2007 Generation-A	Nippon Budokan	Avec Tune, Avex Trax, Columbia Music Entertainment, DMP Records, evolution, FIX Records, Geneon, King Records, Lantis, Realize Records, Sistus Records
2008	August 30–31	Animelo Summer Live 2008 -Challenge-	Saitama Super Arena	Avex Trax, Geneon, King Records, Lantis
2009	August 22–23	Animelo Summer Live 2009 -RE:BRIDGE-	Saitama Super Arena	5pb., flying DOG, Geneon, King Records, Lantis
2010	August 28–29	Animelo Summer Live 2010 -evolution-	Saitama Super Arena	5pb., Akihabara Records, Avex Trax, flying DOG, Geneon, King Records, Lantis, Realize Records
2011	August 27–28	Animelo Summer Live 2011 -rainbow-	Saitama Super Arena	flying DOG, Geneon, King Records, Lantis
2012	August 25–26	Animelo Summer Live 2012 -infinity-	Saitama Super Arena	flying DOG, Geneon, King Records, Lantis
2013	August 23–25	Animelo Summer Live 2013 -Flag Nine-	Saitama Super Arena	flying DOG, Geneon, King Records, Lantis
2014	August 29–31	Animelo Summer Live 2014 -Oneness-	Saitama Super Arena	5pb., flying DOG, King Records, Lantis, NBCUniversal Entertainment Japan, Pony Canyon, Sony Music Entertainment, Warner Bros. Home Entertainment
2015	August 28–30	Animelo Summer Live 2015 -The Gate-	Saitama Super Arena	5pb., flying DOG, King Records, Lantis, NBCUniversal Entertainment Japan, Pony Canyon, Sony Music Entertainment, Warner Bros. Home Entertainment
2016	August 26–28	Animelo Summer Live 2016 -TOKI-	Saitama Super Arena	5pb., flying DOG, King Records, Lantis, NBCUniversal Entertainment Japan, Pony Canyon, Sony Music Entertainment, Warner Bros. Home Entertainment
2017	August 25–27	Animelo Summer Live 2017 -THE CARD-	Saitama Super Arena	5pb., Cana aria, flying DOG, King Records, Lantis, NBCUniversal Entertainment Japan, Pony Canyon, Sony Music Entertainment, Warner Bros. Home Entertainment
2018	August 24–26	Animelo Summer Live 2018 -OK!-	Saitama Super Arena	KADOKAWA, King Records, ZERO-A, Sony Music Entertainment, DIVE II Entertainment, Nippon Columbia, 5pb., Bandai Namco Entertainment, Flying Dog, Bushiroad Music, Pony Canyon, Lantis
2019	August 30–September 1	Animelo Summer Live 2019 -STORY-	Saitama Super Arena	ANiUTa, Good Smile Company, LIVE DAM STADIUM, Astro Voice, King Records, GloryHeaven, Sony Music Entertainment, DIVE II entertainment, DMM music, Nippon Columbia, Bandai Namco Entertainment, 5pb.Records, FlyingDog, Bushiroad Music, Pony Canyon, Lantis
2021	August 27–29	Animelo Summer Live 2021 -COLORS-	Saitama Super Arena	Yakult Honsha, Lumica, d Anime Store, MAGES., ANiUTa, Kinkan, Assault Lily Project, Amuse, Avex Pictures, KADOKAWA, King Records, Sony Music Entertainment, D-GO, Nippon Columbia, Bandai Namco Arts, Bandai Namco Entertainment, Being, FlyingDog, Bushiroad Music, Pony Canyon, MAGES., Universal Music, Lantis, Warner Bros. Japan
2022	August 26–28	Animelo Summer Live 2022 -Sparkle-	Saitama Super Arena	d Anime Store, Lumica, MAGES., D4DJ Groovy Mix, merchan.jp, Mangart Beams, LIVE DAM Ai, Nissin Curry Meshi, Up-Front Works, Avex Pictures, NBCUniversal Entertainment Japan, KADOKAWA, King Records, Cygames, Sony Music Entertainment, DONUTS, Nippon Columbia, Being, FlyingDog, Bushiroad Music, Project IDOLY PRIDE, Pony Canyon, MAGES., Universal Music, Lantis
2023	August 25–27	Animelo Summer Live 2023 -AXEL-	Saitama Super Arena	d Anime Store, Lumica, MAGES., Vantan, LIVE DAM AiR, Shin Nippon Protein, Avex Pictures, NBCUniversal Entertainment Japan, KADOKAWA, King Records, Sony Music Entertainment, Nippon Columbia, FlyingDog, Bushiroad Music, Pony Canyon, Marvelous, Lantis
2024	August 30–September 1	Animelo Summer Live 2024 -Stargazer-	Saitama Super Arena	d Anime Store, Elfin, Vantan, ABEMA, MAGES., Lumica, REALITY, SPWN, LIVE DAM AiR, Abstream Creation, Nissou Kogyo, Shin Nippon Protein, A-Sketch, Avex Pictures, NBCUniversal Entertainment Japan, KADOKAWA, Key Sounds Label, GLEAN, Cygames RECORDS, Sanrio, Sony Music Entertainment, Nippon Columbia, Bushiroad Music, FlyingDog, Pony Canyon, Horipro International, MAGES., MENT RECORDING, Lantis, Warner Bros. Japan
2025	August 29–31	Animelo Summer Live 2025 -Thanxx!-	Saitama Super Arena	d Anime Store, Nissou Kogyo, Elfin, JR Tokai Tours, U-NEXT, KADOKAWA, King Records, Sony Music Entertainment, DIVE II entertainment, Nippon Columbia, HIGHWAY STAR, FIREWORKS, Bushiroad Music, Pony Canyon, MONSTER design Inc., Lantis, Warner Music Japan
2026	July 10–12	Animelo Summer Live 2026 -Messenger-	Makuhari Messe	d Anime Store, Elf-in, Reality, Abema, Mages., Lumica
2027	August 27–29	Animelo Summer Live 2027	GMO Arena Saitama	

=== Spin-Off Events ===
Year	Date	Title	Performers
2010	October 31–November 3	Anisama Girl's Night	Natsuko Asō, Faylan, Asami Imai, Masami Okui, Minami Kuribayashi, May'n, Aki Misato, Aiko Nakano, Hiromi Sato, Asami Shimoda, Ryoko Shintani, Suara, Stephanie
2011	February 19	Anisama in Shanghai	ALI PROJECT, Masaaki Endoh, Faylan, Yoshiki Fukuyama, Miku Hatsune, Yoko Ishida, Mitsuo Iwata, JAM Project, Hironobu Kageyama, Kimeru, Hiroshi Kitadani, Minami Kuribayashi, May'n, Showtaro Morikubo, Masami Okui, Daisuke Ono, Kenichi Suzumura
2012	May 26	Anisama Super Game Song Live 2012	AiRI, Afilia Saga East, Ayane, Ceui, CooRie, Faylan, Asami Imai, Kanako Ito, Minami Kuribayashi, Lien, Halko Momoi, NanosizeMir, Nao, Prico, Rita, Yui Sakakibara, Hiromi Sato, Sakura Taisen Teikoku, The Idolmaster, Yozuca*, Zwei
2012	(Cancelled)	Anisama in Shanghai 2012 -Next Stage-	Eir Aoi, Minori Chihara, CONNECT, FLOW, Luna Haruna, Mitsuo Iwata, JAM Project, Minami Kuribayashi, May'n, miko, Masayoshi Minoshima, Nana Mizuki, Nomico, Root Five, Kenichi Suzumura, Yukari Tamura
2020	August 30	Animelo Summer Night in Billboard Live	Oishi Masayoshi, Aina Suzuki, Masayuki Suzuki, Airi Suzuki, TRUE, Saori Hayami, Suzuko Mimori, Hiroko Moriguchi
2021	March 14	Animelo Summer Night II in Billboard Live	Oishi Masayoshi, Ayaka Ohashi, Minori Suzuki, Kanako Takatsuki, Saori Hayami, ReoNa, Ken Washizaki
2024	September 21	Anisama World in ABEMA Anime Festival	Miho Okazaki, Nasuo☆, Saori Hayami, halca, fripSide, Philosophy no Dance, MADKID, Aguri Onishi, Kaori Maeda
2024	November 16	Anisama World 2024 in Shanghai	T.M.Revolution, Shota Aoi, Miku Ito, Saito Shuka, Liyuu, Ayaka Ohashi, Konomi Suzuki, Minori Chihara, TRUE, ReoNa, Takanori Nishikawa, Tetsuya Komuro
2024	December 15	Anisama V God 2024	Asano Ruri, Amane Kanata, Ookami Mio, Momosuzu Nene, Yukihana Lamy, Shibuya Haru, Hizuki Yui, Suou Patra, Kaede Higuchi, Dream Chasing, Fuji Aoi, MonsterZ MATE, YuNi, Flower record, Rime, Spring Sarubi, ヰWorld sentiment, Fox, Deer Club, Hiroshi Kitadani, Hiroko Moriguchi
2025	May 24	Anisama World 2025 in Taoyuan	T.M.Revolution, ASCA, GARNiDELiA, Hiroko Moriguchi, nonoc, Junichi Sato (fhána), sajou no hana, RAISE A SUILEN, ReoNa, Ayasa, REAL AKIBA BOYZ
2025	June 7	Anisama World 2025 in Manila	FLOW, ASH DA HERO, nobodyknows+, Ave Mujica, Hiroshi Kitadani, Toshiya Miyata, ArdaRyn, Mayu Maejima
2026	September 12	ANISAMA MALAYSIA 2026 ~Gateway~	Machico, MYTH & ROID, Konomi Suzuki, Aguri Onishi, Lia, TSH48, KLP48
2027	March 13–14	Anisama Fukuoka 2027	

== Performers ==
Year	Performers	Special Guests	Secret Guests
2005	Rina Aiuchi, can/goo, Yoko Ishida, JAM Project, Hironobu Kageyama, Minami Kuribayashi, Nana Mizuki, Tomoe Ohmi, Masami Okui, Mikuni Shimokawa, Tatsuhisa Suzuki, Naozumi Takahashi, Unicorn Table, Chihiro Yonekura	—N/a	—N/a
2006	Rina Aiuchi, Ali Project, Yoko Ishida, Chiaki Ishikawa, JAM Project, Aiko Kayo, KENN with The NaB's, Minami Kuribayashi, Nana Mizuki, Masami Okui, savage genius, Naozumi Takahashi, U-ka saegusa IN db, Chihiro Yonekura	Minori Chihara, Yūko Gotō, Aya Hirano	—N/a
2007	Ali Project, Minori Chihara, Cy-Rim rev., JAM Project, Jyukai, Minami Kuribayashi, Nana Mizuki, Haruko Momoi, Tomoe Ohmi, Masami Okui, m.o.v.e, Psychic Lover, Suara, Naozumi Takahashi	Yabeno Hikomaru (Denchu), Aya Hirano, Kotohime (MOMOEIKA)	PaniCrew, Yoko Takahashi
2008	AAA, AKINO from bless4, Ali Project, ave;new feat. Saori Sakura, Minori Chihara, CooRie, Domestic Love Band, ELISA, Yoshiki Fukuyama, GRANRODEO, Aya Hirano, Yui Horie, Kurobara Hozonkai, Yoko Ishida, Chiaki Ishikawa, JAM Project, Karen Girl's, Minami Kuribayashi, Lia, May'n, miko, Aki Misato, Nana Mizuki, Haruko Momoi, MOSAIC.WAV, m.o.v.e, Masami Okui, Psychic Lover, savage genius, Sound Horizon, Suara, The Idolmaster, yozuca*, Yukari Tamura, Chihiro Yonekura,	—N/a	—N/a
2009	Ali Project, angela, Ayane (with Shikura Chiyomaru), Beat Mario, Minori Chihara, ELISA, Faylan, FictionJunction, GACKT, GRANRODEO, Miku Hatsune (from Vocaloid 2), Aya Hirano, Yui Horie, Chiaki Ishikawa, Kanako Itō, JAM Project, Hironobu Kageyama, Minami Kuribayashi, Manzo, May'n, Mamoru Miyano, Nana Mizuki, Haruko Momoi, m.o.v.e, Tomoe Ohmi, Kenji Ohtsuki, Masami Okui, Psychic Lover, Yui Sakakibara, savage genius, Asami Shimoda, Suara, Yukari Tamura, Yosei Teikoku, The Idolmaster, Chihiro Yonekura	Shoko Nakagawa	—N/a
2010	Ali Project, angela, Ayane, Minori Chihara, Crush Tears, ELISA, Masaaki Endoh, Faylan, fripSide, Girls Dead Monster (LiSA & Marina), GRANRODEO, Chiaki Ishikawa, Kanako Itō, JAM Project, Minami Kuribayashi, Lia, May'n, Milky Holmes, Milktub, Nana Mizuki, Halko Momoi, Yuuka Nanri, Nomico + Masayoshi Minoshima, Masami Okui, Psychic Lover, Sphere, Naozumi Takahashi, Yukari Tamura, THE GOMBAND, Chihiro Yonekura	—N/a	KOTOKO, motsu, Magician Shiro, Naomi Tamura, Magician Toshihiro
2011	Natsuko Aso, BREAKERZ, Minori Chihara, ELISA, Erio wo Kamatte-chan, Faylan, fripSide, GRANRODEO, Yui Horie, Hyadain, Chiaki Ishikawa, Kanako Ito + Shikura Chiyomaru, JAM Project, Kalafina, Minami Kuribayashi, Maon Kurosaki, May'n, Milky Holmes, Mamoru Miyano, Nana Mizuki, Momoiro Clover Z, Nanamori Chu☆Goraku Bu, (Note: Nanamori Chu☆Goraku Bu consists of Shiori Mikami, Minami Tsuda, Yuka Ōtsubo and Rumi Ōkubo.) Phantasm (cv. Yui Sakakibara), Ro-Kyu-Bu!, Sayaka Sasaki, Yukari Tamura, The Idolmaster, ULTRA-PRISM	—N/a	ALTIMA, Ichirou Mizuki, Nana Mizuki, Isao Sasaki, T.M.Revolution
2012	Afilia Saga East, Akino from Bless4, Ali Project, ALTIMA, Eir Aoi, Minori Chihara, GRANRODEO, Miku Hatsune, Yui Horie, Chiaki Ishikawa, Kanako Ito + Chiyomaru Shikura, Mami Kawada, Eri Kitamura, Mikako Komatsu, Minami Kuribayashi, Maon Kurosaki, LiSA, Haruna Luna, May'n, Milky Holmes, Sachika Misawa, Mamoru Miyano, Nanamori Chu☆Goraku Bu, Yuuka Nanri, Iori Nomizu, Daisuke Ono, Persona 4 Music Band, Ray, ST☆RISH, StylipS, Konomi Suzuki, Kenichi Suzumura, Yukari Tamura, μ's, Ushiro Karahai Yoritai G, YuiKaori, Zwei	—N/a	Hiroko Moriguchi, Natsuki Okamoto in ALTIMA Performance, Tetsuro Oda / TETSU, Noboru Uesugi
2013	Afilia Saga East, Aiu ♥-ra bu, Ali Project, Angela, Eir Aoi, Minori Chihara, ChouCho, Earthmind, FLOW, FripSide, Maiko Fujita, Gero, GRANRODEO, Luna Haruna, Yoko Hikasa, Hiroaki "TOMMY" Tominaga, i☆Ris, Kanako Ito, Eri Kitamura, Mikako Komatsu, Minami Kuribayashi, Maon Kurosaki, Akira Kushida, LiSA, May'n, Milky Holmes, Sachika Misawa, Mamoru Miyano, Nana Mizuki, Momoiro Clover Z, Shoko Nakagawa, Megumi Nakajima, Nanamori Chu☆Goraku Bu, nano.RIPE, Yuuka Nanri, Iori Nomizu, OLDCODEX, Petit Milady, Psychic Lover, Ray, Sphere, ST☆RISH, Konomi Suzuki, Kenichi Suzumura, Ayana Taketatsu, Yukari Tamura, The Idolmaster Cinderella Girls, The Idolmaster (Million Live), T-Pistonz+KMC, μ's, Sumire Uesaka, Ushiro Kara Hai Yori Tai G, Masayuki Yamamoto, YuiKaori, ZAQ, Zwei	—N/a	coda, KibaobuAkiba, motsu, NoB, Anna Tsuchiya
2014	9nine, Afilia Saga, ALTIMA, Angela, Eir Aoi, Minori Chihara, fhána, FLOW, FripSide, GRANRODEO, Jin Hashimoto, Mitsuko Horie, Yui Horie, Kanako Ito, JAM Project, Jigoku no sata ōrusutāzu Ani Takeru jigoku-hen, Kalafina, Kantai Collection, Eri Kitamura, Minami Kuribayashi, Maon Kurosaki, LiSA, Pichi Maki (cv. Sumire Uesaka), May'n, Suzuko Mimori, Sachika Misawa, Miss Monochrome, Mamoru Miyano, Nana Mizuki, Momoiro Clover Z, Nagareta Project, Yoshino Nanjo, OLDCODEX, Kenshō Ono, Precure Summer Rainbow!, Petit Milady, Project.R, STAR☆ANIS, Konomi Suzuki, Sweet Arms, Yukari Tamura, The Idolmaster, The Idolmaster Cinderella Girls, The Idolmaster Million Stars, T.M.Revolution, Takayoshi Tanimoto, μ's, Kouji Wada, Wake Up, Girls!, YuiKaori, Aoi Yuuki, ZAQ	—N/a	—N/a
2015	3-Nen E-gumi-sama, (Note: 3-Nen E-gumi-sama consists of Mai Fuchigami, Aya Suzaki, Nobuhiko Okamoto, Ryota Osaka, Minami Tanaka and Yoshitaka Yamaya.) AKINO from Bless4, Angela, Shouta Aoi, Mashiro Ayano, BACK-ON, Minori Chihara, ChouCho, CustomiZ, fhána, FripSide, GARNiDELiA, GRANRODEO, Luna Haruna, Yuka Iguchi, Asami Imai, i☆Ris, Kanako Ito, JO☆STARS, (Note: JO☆STARS consists of Hiroaki TOMMY Tominaga, Coda and Jin Hashimoto.) Kalafina, Mami Kawada, King Cream Soda, Mikako Komatsu, Natsumi Kon, Maon Kurosaki, LiSA, Mitsuru Matsuoka, Melocure, Milky Holmes, Mamoru Miyano, Momoiro Clover Z, Nanamori Chu☆Goraku Bu, Yoshino Nanjo, Shiena Nishizawa, Emi Nitta, Iori Nomizu, Ayaka Ōhashi, Masayoshi Ōishi, Kenshō Ono, Pile, Ray, Rhodanthe*, (Note: Rhodanthe* consists of Asuka Nishi, Manami Tanaka, Yumi Uchiyama, Risa Taneda and Nao Tōyama.) Eri Sasaki, SCREEN Mode, Sphere, Konomi Suzuki, TesaPurun, The Idolmaster, The Idolmaster Cinderella Girls, TRUSTRICK, TrySail, μ's, Maaya Uchida, Kanon Wakeshima, Wake Up, Girls!, YuiKaori, ZAQ	—N/a	Marty Friedman, Motsu, Yoshihito Onda, OxT (Note: OxT consists of Masayoshi Ōishi and Tom-H@ck.)
2016	Yūka Aisaka, AKINO from Bless4, Ali Project, ALTIMA, angela, Shouta Aoi, AOP, batta, B.B.Queens, Chikyuu Bouei-bu, (Note: Chikyuu Bouei-bu consists of Kazutomi Yamamoto, Yuichiro Umehara, Kōtarō Nishiyama, Yusuke Shirai and Toshiki Masuda.) Earphones, (Note: Earphones consists of Rie Takahashi, Yuki Nagaku and Marika Kouno.) everying!, fhána, FLOW, GRANRODEO, Luna Haruna, Saori Hayami, Yuka Iguchi, Riho Iida, i☆Ris, Demon Kakka, Kinniku Shōjo Tai, Kitauji Quartet, (Note: Kitauji Quartet consists of Tomoyo Kurosawa, Ayaka Asai, Moe Toyota, Chika Anzai.) KOTOKO, Minami Kuribayashi, Maon Kurosaki, Lia, LiSA, May'n, MICHI, Suzuko Mimori, Rie Murakawa, Nano, Shiena Nishizawa, Manami Numakura, Ayaka Ōhashi, Kenshō Ono, OxT, Petit Milady, Pile, Plasmagica, (Note: Plasmagica consists of Eri Inagawa, Sumire Uesaka, Manami Numakura and Ayane Sakura.) Poppin'Party from BanG Dream!, SCREEN Mode, Suara, Konomi Suzuki, Azusa Tadokoro, Ayahi Takagaki, Ayana Taketatsu, Nami Tamaki, THE DU, The Idolmaster Cinderella Girls, Haruka Tomatsu, TRUE, TRUSTRICK, TrySail, Maaya Uchida, Yohsuke Yamamoto, YuiKaori, ZAQ, Zwei	—N/a	Mami Ayukawa, Girls Dead Monster, Yoko Ishida, Rika Matsumoto
2017	angela, Shouta Aoi, Aqours, Minori Chihara, ClariS, fhána, FLOW, fripSide, GRANRODEO, Luna Haruna, Saori Hayami, Idolmaster Million Stars, Idolmaster Side M, i☆Ris, Kemono Friends, KING OF PRISM, Kirakira ☆ Precure Mode Summer Session, Minami Kuribayashi, Maon Kurosaki, LiSA, Luce Twinkle Wink, Machico, Milky Holmes, Suzuko Mimori, Inori Minase, Nana Mizuki, Megumi Nakajima, Shiena Nishizawa, Ayaka Ohashi, Hanako Oku, OxT, Pyxis, Roselia from BanG Dream!, SCREEN mode, Sphere, Konomi Suzuki, Kenichi Suzumura, Yukari Tamura, Nao Toyama, TRUE, TrySail, Maaya Uchida, Sumire Uesaka, Wake Up, Girls!, Hatano Wataru, YuiKaori, ZAQ	Kiyoshi Hikawa	SOS Brigade May'n
2018	Shouta Aoi, Aqours, Asaka, Minori Chihara, DearDream, fhána, GARNiDELiA, GRANRODEO, Luna Haruna, Idolmaster Million Stars, Idolmaster Side M, I☆Ris, Miku Itō, JAM PROJECT, Ayaka Kikuchi, Suzuko Mimori, Inori Minase, MYTH & ROID, Masayoshi Ōishi, Oresama, OLDCODEX, Poppin'Party from BanG Dream!, SisterS, Konomi Suzuki, Minori Suzuki, Ayana Taketatsu, TRUE, TrySail, Sumire Uesaka, Aya Uchida, Maaya Uchida, Aoi Yūki, Mamoru Miyano, Starlight Kukugumi, ZAQ, Wake Up, Girls!	—N/a	Aoi Eir
2019	I☆Ris, Kaori Ishihara, Masayoshi Ōishi, Konomi Suzuki, fhána, Sphere, Suzuko Mimori, ReoNA, Roselia from BanG Dream!, Miku Itō, Sayaka Sasaki, Mai Fuchigami, Rikako Aida, Megumi Nakajima, Animelo Summer Princesses from Princess Connect! Re:Dive, Masayuki Suzuki, Kemono Friends, Kiyoshi Hikawa, Idolmaster Side M, Asaka, Suzuki Minori, Minori Chihara, Takuma Terashima, TRUE, TrySail, Inori Minase, Minami, Aqours, Ayaka Ohashi, Starlight Kukugumi, Tasuku Hatanaka, angela, Kitauji Quartet, Raise A Suilen from BanG Dream!, Yuiko Ōhara, Aoi Eir, Shouta Aoi, Maaya Uchida, Yuma Uchida, ZAQ, JAM Project, Spira Spica, buzz★Vibes, Poppin'Party from BanG Dream!, Yui Ogura, OxT, JUNNA, Nijigasaki High School Idol Club, Sumire Uesaka, Maon Kurosaki, Asami Imai, ClariS	—N/a	Ho-kago Tea Time
2020	I☆Ris, Aoi Eir, ASCA, Ohashi Ayaka, Okazaki Taiiku, Sukima Switch, Spira Spica, Peaky P-key from D4DJ, Photon Maiden from D4DJ, AiRBLUE, Nishikawa Takanori, Kisida Kyoudan & The Akebosi Rockets, Tomita Miyu, The Idolmaster, Asaka, Argonavis from Bang Dream!, angela, Oishi Masayoshi, GRANRODEO, Suzuki Aina, Starlight Kukugumi, Toyama Nao, TrySail, Iguchi Yuka, Suzuki Masayuki, Suzuki Airi, Kitō Akari, halca, Idolmaster Million Stars, Ohguro Maki, GYROXIA from Bang Dream!, Amamiya Sora, Itō, Miku, Uchida Yuma, SHOW BY ROCK!!, Suzuki Konomi, Suzuki Minori, Minori Chihara, TRUE, Nakamura Shugo, Moriguchi Hiroko, ReoNa, Assault Lily, Eripiyo & Maina	—N/a	—N/a

== Media ==
=== CD ===
Name	Release date	Vocals	Lyrics	Composition	Label
ONENESS	June 24, 2005	Masami Okui, Hironobu Kageyama, JAM Project, Nana Mizuki, Naozumi Takahashi, Minami Kuribayashi, Chihiro Yonekura, Yoko Ishida, Can/Goo, Mikuni Shimokawa, Unicorn Table, Tomoe Ohmi, Rina Aiuchi	Masami Okui	Masami Okui	Oneness / Animate
OUTRIDE	June 9, 2006	Masami Okui, JAM Project, Nana Mizuki, Naozumi Takahashi, Minami Kuribayashi, Chihiro Yonekura, Yoko Ishida, Rina Aiuchi, ALI PROJECT, U-ka Saegusa in db, Chiaki Ishikawa, Savage Genius, Kenn with the Nab's, Aiko Kayo	Masami Okui	Hironobu Kageyama	Geneon
Generation-A	June 20, 2007	ALI PROJECT, Tomoe Ohmi, Masami Okui, Minami Kuribayashi, Psychic Lover, Cy-rim Rev., JAM Project, Jyukai, Suara, Naozumi Takahashi, Minori Chihara, Nana Mizuki, m.o.v.e, Halko Momoi	Masami Okui	Masami Okui	Dwango
Yells ~It's A Beautiful Life~	July 23, 2008	ALI PROJECT, Chiaki Ishikawa, Yoko Ishida, ELISA, Masami Okui, GRANRODEO, Minami Kuribayashi, Psychic Lover, Savage Genius, JAM Project, Suara, Minori Chihara, Aya Hirano, Aki Misato, Nana Mizuki, May'n, Halko Momoi, Chihiro Yonekura	Masami Okui	Hironobu Kageyama	Dwango / evolution
RE:BRIDGE〜Return to oneself〜	June 24, 2009	Ayane, ALI PROJECT, Chiaki Ishikawa, Kanako Ito, ELISA, Tomoe Ohmi, Masami Okui, GRANRODEO, Minami Kuribayashi, Psychic Lover, Yui Sakakibara, Savage Genius, JAM Project, Suara, Minori Chihara, Aya Hirano, Manzo, Nana Mizuki, May'n, Halko Momoi, Chihiro Yonekura	Masami Okui	Minami Kuribayashi	Dwango / evolution
Evolution 〜for beloved one〜	June 23, 2010	Ayane, ALI PROJECT, Chiaki Ishikawa, Kanako Ito, Masami Okui, GRANRODEO, Minami Kuribayashi, JAM Project, Yukari Tamura, Minori Chihara, Yuuka Nanri, Faylan, fripSide, Nana Mizuki, May'n, Halko Momoi	Masami Okui	Minami Kuribayashi	D-Generation
Rainbow	July 27, 2011	Natsuko Aso, ELISA, Kanako Ito, GRANRODEO, Minami Kuribayashi, Maon Kurosaki, JAM Project, Yukari Tamura, Minori Chihara, Nana Mizuki, May'n	Shikura Chiyomaru	Shikura Chiyomaru	—N/a
Infinity -1000-nen no Yume-	July 18, 2012	Akino from bless4, Mami Kawada, GRANRODEO, Eri Kitamura, Minami Kuribayashi, Yukari Tamura, Minori Chihara, May'n	Hironobu Kageyama, Masami Okui	Hironobu Kageyama, Masami Okui	—N/a
The Galaxy Express 999	May 22, 2013	i☆Ris, Afilia Saga East, ALI PROJECT, Kanako Ito, Sumire Uesaka, Yui Ogura, OLDCODEX, Eri Kitamura, Akira Kushida, Minami Kuribayashi, Maon Kurosaki, GRANRODEO, Gero, Mikako Komatsu, Psychic Lover, ZAQ, Konomi Suzuki, Kenichi Suzumura, Ayana Taketatsu, Yukari Tamura, Minori Chihara, Choucho, Hiroaki "TOMMY" Tominaga, Zwei, Megumi Nakajima, Nanamori-Chu☆Gorakubu, Nano.RIPE, Yuuka Nanri, Iori Nomizu, Yoko Hikasa, Maiko Fujita, Sachika Misawa, Nana Mizuki, May'n, YuiKaori, Ray	Yoko Narahashi, Keisuke Yamakawa	Yukihide Takekawa	—N/a
ONENESS 2014 ver.	May 13, 2014	Idolmaster, Eir Aoi, Afilia Saga East, Angela, Wake Up, Girls!, Kanako Ito, Kensho Ono, OLDCODEX, Eri Kitamura, Minami Kuribayashi, GRANRODEO, Maon Kurosaki, ZAQ, JAM Project, Sweet Arms, Konomi Suzuki, STAR☆ANIS, Takayoshi Tanimoto, Yukari Tamura, Minori Chihara, T.M.Revolution, Sayaka Nakagaya, Hitoshi Hashimoto, Fhána, FLOW, Petit Milady, Yui Horie, Sachika Misawa, Nana Mizuki, Suzuko Mimori, Mamoru Miyano, μ's, May'n, YuiKaori, Aoi Yuuki, Hitomi Yoshida, LiSA, Kouji Wada	Masami Okui	Masami Okui	—N/a
Hajimare, THE GATE!!	May 13, 2015	i☆Ris, Angela, Yuka Iguchi, Asami Imai, Aya Uchida, Maaya Uchida, Kenshō Ono, GRANRODEO, Maon Kurosaki, Natsumi Kon, ZAQ, Konomi Suzuki, TRUSTRICK, Pile, Luna Haruna, Milky Holmes, YuiKaori	Aki Hata	Kazunori Watanabe	Dwango / Evolution
PASSION RIDERS	April 26, 2016	Yūka Aisaka, Eir Aoi, Shouta Aoi, everying!, Ayaka Ōhashi, Maon Kurosaki, GRANRODEO, SCREEN Mode, Konomi Suzuki, Saori Hayami, Suzuko Mimori, LiSA	Aki Hata	Kazunori Watanabe	Tower Records
Playing the World	May 17, 2017	Idolmaster Side M, OxT, GRANRODEO, Konomi Suzuki, Minori Chihara, TRUE, Saori Hayami, Luna Haruna, Pyxis, Megumi Nakajima, Hatano Wataru, fripSide, Machico, Minami, Suzuko Mimori	ZAQ	ZAQ, EFFY	Tower Records
Stand by ... MUSIC !!!	May 16, 2018	Aya Uchida, Ayana Taketatsu, TRUE, Miku Ito, Masayoshi Oishi, fhána, Minori Suzuki, Maaya Uchida, The Idolm@ster SideM, Asaka, Konomi Suzuki, The Idolm@ster Million Live! Millionstars, GRANRODEO, Aoi Yuki.	Miho Karasawa	Satoru Kousaka	Tower Records
CROSSING STORIES	May 17, 2019	Asaka, Kaori Ishihara, Miku Ito, Masayoshi Oishi, Ayaka Ohashi, ZAQ, JUNNA, Konomi Suzuki, Sphere, TRUE, towana (fhána), Tasuku Hatanaka, Mikiha (Spira Spica), Suzuko Mimori.	Hideki Hayashi	Junichi Sato	—N/a
