= List of Bofuri episodes =

Bofuri: I Don't Want to Get Hurt, so I'll Max Out My Defense. is an anime television series based on the light novel series of the same title written by Yuumikan and illustrated by Koin. It was announced by Kadokawa on December 6, 2018. The series was animated by Silver Link, and directed by Shin Oonuma and Mirai Minato, with Fumihiko Shimo handling series composition, and Kazuya Hirata designing the characters. The series aired from January 8 to March 25, 2020, on AT-X, ABC, Tokyo MX, TVA, and BS11. Afilia Saga performed the opening theme "Kyūkyoku Unbalance" (究極アンバランス!), while Rico Sasaki performed the ending theme "Play the World." It ran for 12 episodes.

Funimation had licensed the series for a SimulDub. Following Sony's acquisition of Crunchyroll, the series was added to the streaming service. Muse Communication streamed the series on its Muse Asia YouTube channel in Southeast Asia and South Asia.

A second season of the anime was announced at the end of the first season's final episode, and was originally scheduled to air in 2022, but was later delayed. It aired from January 11 to April 19, 2023. Junjō no Afilia performed the opening theme "Kono Tate ni, Kakuremasu" (この盾に、隠れます。), while FRAM performed the ending theme "Step for Joy". On February 13, 2023, the official anime website announced the seventh episode of the season and beyond would be delayed by two weeks till March 8, 2023. The animation staff announced on March 29, 2023, that they scheduled the 11th and 12th episodes for April 12 and 19, to maintain the quality of the footage.

== Series overview ==
Season	Episodes	Originally released	
Season	Episodes	First released	Last released
1	12	January 8, 2020	March 25, 2020
2	12	January 11, 2023	April 19, 2023

== Episodes ==
=== Season 1 (2020) ===
No. overall	No. in season	Title (Note: All English translated titles are taken from Crunchyroll.)	Directed by	Written by	Storyboarded by	Original release date
1	1	"Defense and First Battle."; Transliteration: "Bōgyo Tokka to Hatsu Sentō." (Japanese: 防御特化と初戦闘。)	Yūshi Ibe	Fumihiko Shimo	Mirai Minato	January 8, 2020
At the behest of her friend Risa Shiramine, Kaede Honjou begins playing the virtual reality MMORPG NewWorld Online. Not wanting to get hurt, Kaede creates a shield-wielding avatar named Maple and puts all of her skill points towards defense. Although this leaves her with low speed and weak attack, her high defense allows her to earn new abilities and extra skill points for defense simply by letting enemies attack her. After meeting Kuromu the shielder and Iz the crafter, Maple decides to go to a dungeon to face against the powerful Poison Dragon. Using potions given to her by Kuromu, Maple manages to withstand the dragon's poisonous attacks long enough to develop a complete immunity to poison, allowing her to defeat the dragon by eating it. As a result, she not only gains the Poison Dragon's abilities, but also a one-of-a-kind set of equipment.
2	2	"Defense and Friends."; Transliteration: "Bōgyo Tokka to Otomodachi." (Japanese: 防御特化とお友達。)	Yuta Maruyama	Fumihiko Shimo	Naoto Hosoda	January 15, 2020
Maple decides to take part in a battle royale event, managing to easily defeat everyone who comes to attack her and winning third place. The next day, Risa joins the game as Sally, a swashbuckler specialising in evasion, and the two go to a cave to fish for materials for a new shield. After Sally finds an underwater cave behind a locked door, the two begin visiting the cave each day to allow Sally to explore the cave and improve her underwater skills, allowing her to defeat the boss and earn her own set of equipment.
3	3	"Defense and Reaching Second Level."; Transliteration: "Bōgyo Tokka to Ni-sō Kōryaku." (Japanese: 防御特化と二層攻略。)	Masafumi Tamura	Fumihiko Shimo	Masafumi Tamura	January 22, 2020
While at a café, Maple and Sally hear about the next event from players Dread and Drag, who tell them about a quest in the forest. Finding a basement in an abandoned house, the girls find a man tied up in a chair and heal him to the afterlife, earning a Super Speed skill. Then they relax at a hidden beach area which always has a beautiful sunset. The next day, Maple and Sally head to Level 2 to face off against a deer boss, which Sally manages to defeat after Maple gets knocked out. Afterwards, Maple receives the Snow White shield she ordered from Iz before Sally takes her to a special area where they have a star-filled meal together. The second event, a party-based treasure hunt, soon begins.
4	4	"Defense and Second Event."; Transliteration: "Bōgyo Tokka to Dainikai Ibento." (Japanese: 防御特化と第二回イベント。)	Jun Fukuda	Shingo Nagai	Hiroshi Yoneda	January 29, 2020
As the event begins, Maple and Sally discover a hidden dungeon complete with its own boss, allowing them to earn their first few medals. Heading to the mountains next, the two comes across Kuromu's party, letting them go ahead through a warp. Going in after them, Maple and Sally face off against a powerful ice bird boss Silverwing, whose overly powerful moves start to overpower Maple's defenses. Pushing their skills to their limits, Maple and Sally eventually manage to defeat Silverwing with minimal health remaining. Along with more medals and crafting materials, the girls find a pair of Monster Eggs that eventually hatch into turtle and fox companions, which they name Syrup and Oboro, respectively. Later, the girls reach a desert oasis, where they are challenged by Kasumi the swordswoman.
5	5	"Defense and Spoils of War."; Transliteration: "Bōgyo Tokka to Senri hin." (Japanese: 防御特化と戦利品。)	Yūya Horiuchi	Shingo Nagai	Yūya Horiuchi	February 5, 2020
As Maple tries to catch up with Sally and Kasumi as they fight each other, they all end up falling into an underground dungeon, where they are bound together by a cursed chain that will kill all of them if just one of them dies. Working together to avoid some unbeatable snail monsters, the three clear the dungeon and free themselves from their chains, sharing the spoils of their victory between them. Later on in the event, Maple and Sally meet a player named Kanade, who gives them a hint that leads them to an underwater squid boss, which Maple defeats by poisoning the sea. With Sally earning the remaining medals needed through PvP kills before the end of the event, Maple uses the skills she earned to enhance Syrup into a mobile fortress.
6	6	"Defense and Reinforcements."; Transliteration: "Bōgyo Tokka to Shin Senryoku." (Japanese: 防御特化と新戦力。)	Yūshi Ibe	Fumihiko Shimo	Shinichi Watanabe	February 12, 2020
Managing to earn the right to purchase a guild house, Maple and Sally find a house in the forest and form a new guild named Maple Tree, recruiting Kasumi, Kanade, Kuromu, and Iz as members. Needing more members for an upcoming guild event, Maple recruits two beginner players, Yui and Mai, who both maxed out their strength stats.
7	7	"Defense and Upgrades."; Transliteration: "Bōgyo Tokka to Kyōka." (Japanese: 防御特化と強化。)	Mirai Minato, Shin Oonuma	Fumihiko Shimo	Goichi Iwahata	February 19, 2020
With Maple's help in clearing a dungeon super fast, May and Yui gain new skills letting them dual-wield double-handed weapons and boost their damage. Later, Kanade gains an upgrade to his staff while Kuromu clears a hidden dungeon and earns a new set of equipment. Maple soon comes across a set of quests involving helping an NPC mother cure her daughter. As a result, she gains the "Loving Sacrifice" skill allowing her to share her defense with her guild members, ordering a new set of armor from Iz to match it. Meanwhile, the other guilds decide to keep their eye on Maple Tree during an upcoming event.
8	8	"Defense and Third Event."; Transliteration: "Bōgyo Tokka to Daisankai Ibento." (Japanese: 防御特化と第三回イベント。)	Yūshi Ibe	Shingo Nagai	Shinichi Watanabe	February 26, 2020
As the guild takes part in the third event, in which they must obtain bells from cow enemies, Maple encounters a boss in the church she visited before. Gaining new skills that let her transform into a giant monster, Maple leads her guild into Level 3. After hearing about the area's Machine Lord from an NPC, Maple gets lost and winds up in the Graveyard of Dreams, where she encounters yet another boss. Before the boss goes berserk, it gives Maple the Machine God skill, allowing her to defeat it.
9	9	"Defense and Fourth Event."; Transliteration: "Bōgyo Tokka to Daiyonkai Ibento." (Japanese: 防御特化と第四回イベント。)	Masafumi Tamura	Shingo Nagai	Masafumi Tamura	March 4, 2020
In the runup to the guild event, Sally notices Frederica of the Order of the Holy Sword guild scouting them and challenges her to a duel. After Sally manages to evade all of her magic attacks, Frederica surrenders and tells her about the Flame Emperor guild, unaware that the "skills" Sally used against her were fake. The guild competition soon begins, which each guild tasked with stealing orbs from other guilds while defending their own. Sally uses her stealth and cunning to gain a few orbs, having a brief brush-in with the Holy Sword's Dread before managing to steal an orb from the Flame Emperor. With several orbs under their control, Maple Tree take advantage of Maple's defense to defend their base from all attackers.
10	10	"Defense and Attack."; Transliteration: "Bōgyo Tokka to Shutsugeki." (Japanese: 防御特化と出撃。)	Jun Fukuda	Fumihiko Shimo	Shinichi Watanabe	March 11, 2020
Sally and Kanade go hunting for more orbs while Kuromu and the others prepare an ambush on any attackers, leaving Maple with Mai and Yui to defend the base. Sally soon finds herself surrounded by Frederica's forces, prompting Maple to leave the base to come to her aid and allowing Dread to attack the base. Although Dread manages to deal Mai and Yui their first defeat, Maple manages to stop him before he steals any orbs. As Sally gets some rest, Maple, Mai, and Yui launch an attack on the Flame Emperor, breaking through all of their traps before eventually coming up against Mii, Markus, and Misery.
11	11	"Defense and Mighty Foe."; Transliteration: "Bōgyo Tokka to Kyōteki." (Japanese: 防御特化と強敵。)	Yūya Horiuchi	Shingo Nagai	Goichi Iwahata	March 18, 2020
Mii and her team uses a barrage of attacks to try and push Maple out of attack range, giving Mii enough time trap Maple in a Prison of Flame that deals continuous damage. This prompts Maple to bring out her Machine God form, which manages to defeat Misery and Markus, while Mii uses a Self-Destruct in a failed attempt to take Maple out. With most of the other guilds already eliminated, Maple Tree are confronted by the main members of Holy Sword; Payne, Dread, Frederica, and Drag, with Maple receiving heavy damage from Payne.
12	12	"Defense and Bonds."; Transliteration: "Bōgyo Tokka to Tsunagari." (Japanese: 防御特化とつながり。)	Masahiro Hosoda	Fumihiko Shimo	Masahiro Hosoda	March 25, 2020
Brought down to minimal health, Maple uses a risky counter move to deal Payne's damage back at him. Payne manages to withstand the attack, forcing Maple to bring out her Atrocity form to defeat him and the rest of Holy Sword. With all their trump cards out in the open, Maple makes use of her Atrocity form to help her team eliminate other guilds to prevent the bigger guilds from gaining more orbs, assisting the Flame Emperor to achieve that goal, prompting other guilds to do the same. As the event comes to an end with Maple Tree in third place, the admins decide to leave Maple alone as she has drawn many new players into the game and many are going to try to be the first to beat her. Maple invites both Holy Sword and the Flame Emperor to join everyone for a celebration and watch the highlights of the event.

=== Season 2 (2023) ===
No. overall	No. in season	Title	Directed by	Written by	Storyboarded by	Original release date
13	1	"Maxing Defense and Christmas."; Transliteration: "Bōgyo Tokka to Kurisumasu." (Japanese: 防御特化とクリスマス。)	Yusuke Sekine	Fumihiko Shimo	Goichi Iwahata	January 11, 2023
Maple Tree reach the newly added Level 4, a Japanese-themed area set in permanent night. While Sally engages in another duel with Frederica, Maple comes across Mii going into a cute creature café, learning that she has a cute side that she keeps a secret from her guild. A week later, Kasumi obtains a new sword, the Purple Phantom Blade, only to discover that using it causes her to end up in a temporary childlike form. Later, Maple teams up with Payne for the game's fourth event, after which she invites everyone over for a Christmas party where they open the Christmas-themed items they got during the event.
14	2	"Maxing Defense, Level 5, and Level 6."; Transliteration: "Bōgyo Tokka to Go-sō to Roku-sō." (Japanese: 防御特化と五層と六層。)	Masahiko Suzuki	Fumihiko Shimo	Shinichi Watanabe	January 18, 2023
Having missed out on reaching Level 5 with the others due to a cold, Maple decides to take on the Level 4 boss by herself. Coming up against an oni boss, Maple defeats it and gains the Pandemonium skill, only to find it was not actually the entrance to Level 5. Joining up with Frederica's party, Maple faces the actual Level 4 boss and defeats it mercilessly with her Pandemonium skill. Joined by Yui and May on Level 5, Maple helps them fight a lightning monster that was giving them trouble before, earning Maple yet another skill. The next week, Maple Tree set forth to Level 6, which turns out to be a horror-themed level that Sally is not too keen on facing until she hears about an item she can obtain. Joined by Maple, the pair head into a haunted mansion that they are inevitably forced to escape, although Sally earns a skill from staying there for a certain amount of time. Back in the real world, Risa finds she is all alone in her house and calls up Kaede for some comfort.
15	3	"Maxing Defense and the Seventh Event."; Transliteration: "Bōgyo Tokka to Dainanakai Ibento." (Japanese: 防御特化と第七回イベント。)	Junya Koshiba	Fumihiko Shimo	Koji Sawai	January 25, 2023
Maple clears the haunted mansion and obtains the items Sally wanted, along with a set of clothes with telekinetic skills. Afterwards, Mii calls Maple to support her while she fights against monsters on Level 6 to gain more skills before they go to a café, where they are joined by Kasumi and Frederica. Maple and Sally team up for the seventh event, in which each party must climb up unique battle towers over five days, unaware that the monsters in Maple's towers were chosen specifically by the admins to take her down. Despite this, Maple and Sally manage to defeat the monsters on the first three floors, a dragon, a skill-stealing book, and an elemental-changing golem.
16	4	"Maxing Defense and Tower Conquest."; Transliteration: "Bōgyo Tokka to Tō Kōryaku." (Japanese: 防御特化と塔攻略。)	Ryūta Yamamoto	Shingo Nagai	Hiroshi Yoneda	February 1, 2023
On the second day of the event, Maple and Sally, along with the other teams, continue to make their way through their respective towers. Reaching the tenth floor, Maple and Sally face off against the event's final boss, who possesses powerful attack and speed. Despite struggling against its various phases, the pair manage to defeat the boss, earning more skills as a result.
17	5	"Maxing Defense and Tentacles."; Transliteration: "Bōgyo Tokka to Shokushu." (Japanese: 防御特化と触手。)	Yusuke Sekine	Shingo Nagai	Masafumi Tamura	February 8, 2023
Maple Tree arrive on Level 7, where it is possible to tame certain monsters into becoming companions, which will allegedly prove useful for the game's eighth event. While Kasumi takes on a newly added quest on Level 4, Yui and Mai try to track down a pair of bear companions, but struggle to defeat a tree monster that holds the bears captive. Meanwhile, during a search for potion ingredients, Maple gets ensnared by a tentacled monster that tries to swallow her whole, only to get devoured by her instead, awarding her with a new skill to produce tentacles. Initially struggling against their respective enemies, Yui, Mai, and Kasumi persevere and eventually manage to overcome their obstacles and earn new companions, Tsukimi and Yukimi the bears and Haku the snake, respectively.
18	6	"Maxing Defense and Tame Monsters."; Transliteration: "Bōgyo Tokka to Teimu Monsutā." (Japanese: 防御特化とテイムモンスター。)	Chihiro Kumano	Fumihiko Shimo	Kazuaki Mōri	February 15, 2023
Kanade fights against a Mirror Slime, which can transform to match their opponent, and makes it his companion, naming it Sou. Meanwhile, Maple and Mii accompany Iz as she goes to various areas in search of items for a quest, which grants her the spirit monster companion Fay, while Kuromu completes his own quest to earn the armor monster companion, Necro, which he can equip to himself.
19	7	"Maxing Defense and Hunting for Crystals."; Transliteration: "Bōgyo Tokka to Hōseki Sagashi." (Japanese: 防御特化と宝石探し。)	Naoki Hishikawa	Shingo Nagai	Miyana Okita	March 8, 2023
After Sally beats Frederica, who introduces her own summon monster Notes, the details of the eighth event are announced, revealing it to be an individual event like the first one. Afterwards, Maple and Sally go walking around the plains where they discover a crystal that serves as one of three keys. After Sally finds a stone tablet underwater depicting what appears to be an event map, Kanade gives them some information leading her and Maple to the bosses that hold the remaining crystal keys. Upon taking the keys to some ruins, the pair are transported to a tranquil place containing a magical spring that evolves Syrup and Oboro into new forms.
20	8	"Maxing Defense and the Eighth Event."; Transliteration: "Bōgyo Tokka to Daihachikai Ibento." (Japanese: 防御特化と第八回イベント。)	Jun Fukuda	Shingo Nagai	Shinichi Watanabe	March 15, 2023
A preliminary event for the eighth event begins, with players required to defeat as many monsters as possible while also fending off other players. As Maple uses a trap to lure monsters towards her, the other Maple Tree members make use of their new companions to raise themselves in the rank. Sally watches a clash between Mii and Payne, which is interrupted when Maple comes through in the mouth of a giant alligator.
21	9	"Maxing Defense and Setting Up a Base."; Transliteration: "Bōgyo Tokka to Kyotenzukuri." (Japanese: 防御特化と拠点作り。)	Masahiko Suzuki	Fumihiko Shimo	Goichi Iwahata	March 22, 2023
The main part of the eighth event begins, with Maple Tree placed in the highest difficulty following the preliminary event. Aiming to earn ten medals they can trade in for skills, the members split into two groups, with Sally, Yui and Mai joining Maple's group. With help from the map Sally found, Maple's group discover a hidden area where they face a group of mud monsters that Mai and Yui defeat with their new projectile abilities, earning their first medal. Meanwhile, Kasumi's group face off against an invisible ninja-type monster, which they defeat thanks to Iz's traps, earning another medal. Afterwards, the two groups reunite and establish a base for themselves in an underground dummy dungeon, setting it up with traps that successfully stops a wave of stronger monsters.
22	10	"Maxing Defense and New Teams."; Transliteration: "Bōgyo Tokka to Shin Konbi." (Japanese: 防御特化と新コンビ。)	Ryūta Yamamoto	Shingo Nagai	Kazuaki Mōri	March 29, 2023
On the second day of the event, the players find themselves separated and spread across the game area with no map or communication functionality. Sally pairs up with Frederica while Maple briefly runs into Mii, who tells her that the map area is gradually shrinking, eliminating anyone who is caught outside it. Later, after more chance encounters lead to Maple Tree, Order of the Holy Sword and Flame Emperor converging, they form an alliance allowing the other guilds to make use of their base. After Mii and Payne deal with the night's wave of stronger monsters, everyone splits into groups in order to try and get more medals.
23	11	"Maxing Defense and New Parties."; Transliteration: "Bōgyo Tokka to Shin Pāti." (Japanese: 防御特化と新パーティ。)	Yusuke Sekine	Fumihiko Shimo	Hiroshi Yoneda	April 12, 2023
Each of the teams manage to clear their respective dungeons and earn more medals. Meanwhile, Maple's group, consisting of herself, Sally, Mii and Frederica, tackle a dungeon of armor-piercing monsters, clearing it with Maple's Atrocity. As the third day of the event begins, the monsters that Maple faced appear all over the map.
24	12	"Maxing Defense and the Big Final Battle."; Transliteration: "Bōgyo Tokka to Daikessen." (Japanese: 防御特化と大決戦。)	Masahiro Hosoda	Fumihiko Shimo	Masahiro Hosoda	April 19, 2023
With the strongest monster of the final day appearing, Maple Tree decide to fight against it while the others protect the other players from the other monsters. After dealing some decent damage to the monster, Maple and Sally manage to knock out its flight ability before the other guilds regroup for an all-out attack. With help from Sally, Maple manages to combine Syrup's laser blast with her Devour ability to defeat the monster, bringing the event to an end and awarding all the survivors with plenty of medals. As Maple and Sally decide to save their medals until Level 8 opens, some other players look forward to taking them on.
