= Aizome =

Aizome may refer to:

- Aizome (藍染め), the Japanese word for indigo dye
- A single by Savage Genius, a Japanese band
