= 91 Days =

Japanese anime television series

- Key visual
- Genre: Crime drama
- Anime television series
- Directed by: Hiro Kaburagi
- Produced by: Toshio Iizuka; Toshihiro Maeda
- Written by: Taku Kishimoto
- Music by: Shōgo Kaida
- Studio: Shuka
- Licensed by: Crunchyroll
- Original network: TBS, MBS, CBC, BS-TBS
- English network: PH: Hero
- Original run: 9 July 2016 – 1 October 2016
- Episodes: 12 + 1 OVA
- icon

91 Days is a Japanese anime television series produced by Shuka. Set during the United States Prohibition era, the series follows Angelo Lagusa and his quest to seek revenge against the Vanetti family. The series aired from July to October 2016.

== Synopsis ==
The story is set in the United States during the last years of Prohibition, where brewed liquor dominates the black market thanks to the Italian Mafia. Angelo Lagusa, a young man whose family was murdered in a Mafia dispute, seeks revenge against the Vanetti family, particularly its Don, Vincent Vanetti which is the Mafiosi that controls Lawless district, and one of the high-ranking members of the Cosa Nostra. After seven years in hiding in the Midwest following the night of the murder, Angelo receives an anonymous letter from a friend of his father's, prompting him to return to Lawless and exact his revenge. Under the alias Avilio Bruno, he began to infiltrate the Vanetti clan by gradually befriending the Don's son, Nero Vanetti. Over the course of 91 days, Angelo and Nero navigate the tragic aftermath of the violence they set in motion.

== Characters ==
=== Main characters ===
Angelo Lagusa (アンジェロ・ラグーザ, Anjero Ragūsa)
Avilio Bruno (アヴィリオ・ブルーノ, Avuirio Burūno)
Voiced by: Takashi Kondō (Japanese); Austin Tindle (English)
A victim of a traditional Sicilian crime. His family was mercilessly slaughtered by the Vanettis. He has a severe hatred for the murderers of his family and hid for seven years until he received an anonymous letter to return to Lawless and exact his revenge on the ones responsible. He is known for his brilliant wiles. He tries to earn Nero Vanetti's trust to get to his father, so he can get his revenge by killing them both with ease.
Nero Vanetti (ネロ・ヴァネッティ, Nero Vuanetti)
Voiced by: Takuya Eguchi (Japanese); Ian Moore (English)
The eldest son of Vanetti family with a bright and positive personality, and one of Angelo's main targets for revenge. With his father's illness, he knew the Galassias would take advantage to force their way in and perish his father's rule, so he is willing to keep it from happening and let the Vanettis be the reigning family of Lawless. He believes in the family's pride, refusing to back down to the Orcos or the Galassias no matter what, if they demand something that will demean his family. He later receives the Don seat of the Vanetti organization from his father Vincent after proving that he can lead the family better than his father.

=== Vanetti family ===
The Vanetti family originates from Savoca, Sicily. When Vincenzo Vanetti immigrated to USA, due to the economic crisis, he dreamt of building an empire he could rule. He was forced into the Moreno family through Ganzo Alari. He served under the Morenos for years, who ruled the Lawless district and West Chicago. The Morenos and Galassias feuded, living Vincent an opportunity to increase his own power by dealing with the Galassias in secrecy with Alari's help. Don Moreno's accountant, Testa Lagusa knew of Vincenzo's dealing, and in April 1925, Vincent killed Don Moreno and the Lagusas to keep the knowledge from leaking. After Moreno's demise, the Vanettis became the most feared and respected family alongside the Galassias, but with Vincent getting ill, the Orcos begin to gain power.

Vincenzo Vanetti (ヴィンセント・ヴァネッティ, Vuinsento Vuanetti)
Voiced by: Kazuhiro Yamaji (Japanese); Jeremy Schwartz (English)
The Godfather of the Vanetti family, known as Vincent Vanetti. Vincent is a religious and traditionalist man that values his family above everything else. He is very smart and careful, he is known as "The Man That Rules Lawless From The Shadows". He loves opera and he has a dream to build a fancy playhouse for it. He is a ruthless man though trying to avoid a Mafia war, but when it comes to get what he wants, he is unstoppable. For the last decade he was the most feared and respected face of Lawless, but his illness makes his power severely decrease both in Lawless and La Cosa Nostra.
Constanzia Vanetti (コニー・ヴァネッティ, Konīstanzea Vuanetti)
Voiced by: Masaka Yorino (Japanese); Jessica Cavanagh (English)
Wife of Vincent Vanetti and mother of Nero, Fio, and Frate known as Connie. She dies of an unknown illness when Nero is 10 years old. With Vincent seeing his children losing their mother, he promises himself to build them a good life (this was one of the reasons that makes Vincent betray his Don and usurp his power).
Ganzo Alari (ガンゾ・アラリー, Ganzo Ararī)
Voiced by: Masuo Amada (Japanese); Chris Messersmith (English)
Former underboss of the Moreno family, and current left-hand man of Vincent. Not only is the person who sent Angelo the anonymous letter to come to Lawless, but he is also the fourth man on the night of the murder of Angelo's family. Despite being prone to anger, he is a very greedy man and wants the higher-ups of his organization to be taken care of by Angelo, so he can have all the power, money, and women of Lawless to himself.
Frate Vanetti (フラテ・ヴァネッティ, Furate Vuanetti)
Voiced by: Kōtarō Nishiyama (Japanese); Justin Briner (English)
Nero's younger brother, and youngest son of Vincent Vanetti. He is willing to sacrifice anything to preserve peace between the families. He is somewhat weak-willed, as he is even willing to kill his own brother to preserve the peace. He believes that the Vanettis' strength cannot stand against the Galassias and that they should surrender to them without a fight. He is jealous of Nero's natural ability to lead people and do as he pleases, and even believes that Nero is the sole cause of the chaos that caused both the Galassias and the Orcos to want him dead. Ronaldo starts to vet him to be named the head of the Vanettis after the Galassias force Vincent to step down, but fate does not let him to be the Don, no matter how much he wants it.
Fio Vanetti (フィオ・ヴァネッティ, Fio Vuanetti)
Voiced by: Hisako Tōjō (Japanese); Alex Moore (English)
Frate and Nero's sister and Vincent's only daughter. Her marriage with Ronaldo was pre-arranged to build alliance and kinship with the Galassia family. She cares deeply for both her brothers and does not want either to die or fight each other.
Vanno Clemente (ヴァンノ・クレメンテ, Vuan'no Kuremente)
Voiced by: Daisuke Ono (Japanese); Newton Pittman (English)
One of Nero Vanetti's closest friends, ever since childhood, and one of Angelo's main targets of revenge. Like Nero, he believes that the Vanettis own Lawless district and they should keep it to themselves, no matter what. He is a religious person, and has no qualms of starting a war with the rival clans. Despite being good friend, it is revealed that Vanno along with Vincent and Nero was the third man who killed Angelo's family and being the one who killed Testa Lagusa which Vanno mentioned was his very first murder and Angelo remembers it. Angelo gets revenge on Vanno by being first one to be killed, Vanno is shocked when Angelo reveals who he is and the fact the son of the man who was Vanno's first murder becomes payback as he becomes Angelo's first murder.
Barbero (バルベロ, Barubero)
Voiced by: Takahiro Sakurai (Japanese); Aaron Roberts (English)
The new consigliere of the Vanetti family. Nero's subordinate who is calm and collected. He helps Nero make reasonable decisions for the family. He is willing to sacrifice anything to protect Nero's life.
Del Toro (デルトロ, Deru Toro)
Voiced by: Kanehira Yamamoto (Japanese); Philip Weber (English)
The right-hand man and bodyguard of Vincent Vanetti. He has served under Vincent for many years since WWI. Vincent chose him to accompany killing the Lagusas but he gets caught on a crime for the Vanettis, after 5 years in prison he returns to the Vanettis and works as Vincent's personal bodyguard. He cannot speak cause his throat is wounded in the war. His physical and mental power makes it difficult to approach Vincent Vanetti.
Tigre (ティグレ, Tigure)
Voiced by: Kenji Hamada (Japanese); Jarrod Greene (English)
A Vanetti caporegime, and one of Nero's trusted subordinates and allies. He is one of the most loyal members of the Vanetti family who refuses to back down, even if the price is death. When Frate Vanetti and Ronaldo tries to assassinate Nero, he saves him and gets wounded by Frate's men.
Volpe (ヴォルペ, Vourupe)
Voiced by: Tatsuhisa Suzuki (Japanese); Marcus D. Stimac (English)
Professional soldato of the Vanetti family, and one of Nero's most loyal friends and reliable subordinates. When he and Angelo try to assassinate Frate and Ronaldo, they fail and escape. After getting away somewhere near the Vanettis' territory, Angelo kills him before warning Nero (Nero is not aware of the plan because it is made up by Angelo to incite a feud within the Vanetti clan and kill their men by each other). After Frate finds his body, he thinks that Nero set the assassination plan, so Frate and his men hang his body on Lawless bridge as a message for Nero. And that causes an internal war within the Vanetti family, which costs them many men, influence, and respect.
Arturo Tronco (アルトゥーロ・トロンコ, Arutoūro Toronko)
Voiced by: Makoto Furukawa (Japanese); Joel McDonald (English)
An ex-taxi driver and one of Nero's men, who gets murdered by Orco's men, when he and Vanno are smuggling booze in the Vanetti trade route. His death triggers the Vanettis' hatred of the Orco family.
Gianni (ジャンニ, Janni)
Voiced by: Eiichirou Tokumoto (Japanese); Jack Texas (English)
Vanetti family's high associate. Nero uses him to watch over Angelo to be sure that he is not betraying him.

=== Orco family ===
Don Orco is a former executive of the Moreno family, who split from them to found his own organization. This new Mafia family is ruthless, and carves a bloody path through the streets of the Lawless district. They are rich and their name inspires fear.

Orco (オルコ, Oruko)
Voiced by: Chafurin (Japanese); R. Bruce Elliott (English)
The head of the Orco family. An extremely gluttonous man who's very partial to lasagna. Orco is a fearless and conniving Don. He initially started the dispute between him and the Vanettis by stealing their trade route, but amplified the dispute by killing Tronco. Using Fango, Don Orco planned to kill Nero Vanetti in order to get truce between his organization and the Vanettis' faction, led by Frate, but then Fango became a liability. He meets his demise by Fango and gets eaten by his executives, as per his and Nero's deal to seek protection in exchange for overthrowing Orco.
Fango (ファンゴ)
Voiced by: Kenjiro Tsuda (Japanese); Brandon Potter (English)
Member of the Orco family, and Caporegime of an independent group of assassins. He is ruthless, amibitious, and borderline psychotic person, who is willing to do whatever it takes to get what he wants. With help from Angelo and Nero, he overthrows Orco, subsequently kills him, feeds him to his executives, and becomes the head of the organization by usurpation. He wants the recipe for Corteo's Lawless Heaven brew as he was seeking to hit it rich with the imminent end of Prohibition. He forms a bargain with Corteo, who is trying to escape the fighting; he would protect Corteo, as long as he gives him the recipe and the location of Nero, But when Scuza provides the recipe of Lawless Heaven, seized by the FBI in a raid on Vanetti's distillery, he no longer had a need for Corteo. He initially tries to kill Corteo, but then decides to leave him to the Vanettis, whom he had betrayed. But before he could inform them, Corteo kills him.
Serpente (セルペンテ, Serupente)
Voiced by: Yasuyuki Kase (Japanese); Jason Liebrecht (English)
Fango's subordinate, and the Soldato that killed Tronco. Vanno would go on to kill him, avenging Tronco's death. His corpse was secretly taken by Cerotto and sold to Scuza, sparking a war between the Vanettis and Orcos.
Corvo (コルヴォ, Koruvo)
Voiced by: Shunsuke Sakuya (Japanese); Ben Bryant (English)
Orco family's Caporegime. He is extremely smart, powerful, and one of the most trusted men of Don Orco. He cares deeply for loyalty and respect in the Mafia, unlike his boss, he is extremely careful and calm. Fighting with him is not an easy job.
Carmelo (カーメロ, Kamero)
Voiced by: Naoto Kobayashi (Japanese); John Daniels (English)
One of Orco's henchman. The families use him to torture enemies and traitors.
Gatto (ガット, gatto)
Voiced by: Ryuunosuke Watanuki (Japanese); Chris Rager (English)
Fango's enforcer, who first serves under Don Orco, then to Fango himself, then to Nero Vanetti. (After Fango's death, almost all of his men incorporate with the Vanettis)
Botti (ボッティ, Bottï)
Voiced by: Ryuunosuke Watanuki (Japanese); Sean Dinan (English)
Fango's enforcer and Cerotto's older brother. The Orcos use him to extort Corteo, but Angelo takes him down.
Cerotto (チェロット, Cherotto)
Voiced by: Setsuji Satō (Japanese); Drew Wall (English)
Botti's brother and Corteo's close friend, who get mixed up in the feud by trying to sell good alcohol. He witnessed Vanno killing Serpente, such that he sold his body to Scuza, for Fango. Since then, he became a butler for Fango.

=== Galassia family ===
The Chicago Outfit that controls Chicago's underworld and tries to grab hold of Lawless. Their feud with the Moreno family led to the conspiracy that murdered Don Moreno and the Lagusas and created the Vanetti criminal empire that ruled Lawless for 7 years. They try their best to turn the Vanettis into their puppets. The Vanetti and Orco families are not strong enough to go against them and often comply with what they ask.

Galassia (ガラッシア, Garasshia)
Voiced by: Hōchū Ōtsuka (Japanese); Michael Johnson (English)
Head of the bloodthirsty Galassia family based in Chicago. A carefree and somewhat cheerful man, Galassia set all plans in motion behind the scenes through his nephews Ronaldo and Strega. Following Ronaldo's death, he and his family grieve over him, but later, receive a free shipment of Lawless Heaven liquor as a sign that the Vanettis do not want to be his enemies and instead want to make peace and possibly alliance with him, for which, he was invited to the Vanetti's opera theater's opening night.
Strega (ストレガ, Sutorega)
Voiced by: Subaru Kimura (Japanese); David Wald (English)
Galassia's favourite nephew and Underboss and Ronaldo's cousin. He is secretly working with Ganzo to take out both Vincent and Nero. After his uncle dies, he kills Ganzo in retaliation, immediately becomes the Don and ends the Vanetti's reign over Lawless.
Ronaldo (ロナルド, Ronarudo)
Voiced by: Yūichi Nakamura (Japanese); David Trosko (English)
A nephew of Galassia and Strega's cousin. He married Fio in the pre-arranged marriage, made by his father-in-law Vincent in order to make alliance with Galassias. He believes in the authority that he has as a member of the Galassia family, using it to try and keep the other clans in Lawless under his control. He depends on Frate's fear and willingness to get acknowledged to control the Vanettis.

=== Lagusa Household ===
Testa Lagusa was a member of the Moreno family, even before Vincent and the others. He was extremely loyal to his Don, which by the time they controlled all brothels, bars and black market of Lawless. But with Vincent's betrayal and Galassia's rising influence, Testa and Moreno were murdered by the Vanettis. But his only legacy for revenge, Angelo, makes the story longer for bloodshed.

Testa Lagusa (テスタ・ラクーザ, Tesuta Ragūza)
Voiced by: Satoshi Mikami (Japanese); J. Michael Tatum (English)
Angelo's father who was killed by the Vanettis. He was Moreno's accountant, who knew about the deals going on between the Vanetti and Galassia families, and his family was murdered to keep the knowledge from being leaked out.
Elena Lagusa (エレサ・ラクーザ, Erena Ragūza)
Voiced by: Kanami Satō (Japanese); Caitlin Glass (English)
Angelo's mother and Testa's wife, who was killed by the Vanetti family.
Luce Lagusa (ルーチェ・ラクーザ, Rūche Ragūza)
Voiced by: Kaede Hondo (Japanese); Madeleine Morris (English)
Angelo's younger brother who was killed by the Vanettis, because Vincent believed that if he grows up, he will avenge his father and will not forget about them.

=== Supporting characters ===
Don Moreno (ドンモレノ, Don Moureno)
The Don of the Moreno family known as "The Godfather of Lawless" who controlled West Chicago and Lawless district, but did not get along with the Galassias and lost many turfs to them. When the Morenos and the Galassias were at war, Vincent took the opportunity to take over his Don's Empire by making deals with the Galassias in secrecy. In 1925, the Vanettis killed Don Moreno and took over all of his assets. Even after his death, the streets of Lawless could not forget the crime lord that lost all of his heirs for the Vanettis (he does not physically appear within the series because of his mightiness in the story).
Officer Nick (ニック, nikku)
Voiced by: Takaya Kuroda (Japanese); Nicholas Brown (English)
a corrupt police officer in the town of Khota. When Nero greased his hand with some money, he asked him if he knows a bar, so Nick told him a secret place. However, when Mad Mack tortured him to tell him where Nero and Angelo are, he killed him right after he got the answer.
Corteo (コルテオ, Koruteo)
Voiced by: Sōma Saitō (Japanese); Brandon McInnis (English)
Angelo's close childhood friend. His father was one of Moreno's men that was murdered in a dispute, since then, he and his mother lived in poverty, but they were helped out by the Lagusa family. He has developed an extremely delicious brew of alcohol called Lawless Heaven, which he starts to make for the Vanetti family. The only problem is that the ingredients and mixture are more complex than other brews. He is brought into the plot by Angelo. though he hates the Mob, but his love to Angelo made him a part of it. He later becomes very scared about the entire situation and hopes to try and find a way out.
Scuza (スクーザ, Sukūza)
Voiced by: Kōji Ishii (Japanese); Chad Cline (English)
The corrupt Head of the Federal Bureau of Prohibition in Lawless. Through Delphy's investigation of the Lodge, he manages to dig up the recipe for Lawless Heaven, after he was reinstated back to his position, tries to sell it to Fango for an overinflated price, but gets killed instead.
Delphy (デルフィ, Derufi)
Voiced by: Hiroki Tōchi (Japanese); Mark Stoddard (English)
A member of the Federal Bureau of Prohibition from Chicago who replaces Scuza. He has bold intentions to clean up the corruption and organized crime in Lawless. He had been investigating bars all over town, seeking to put liquor sales to a halt, thus limiting the income of the Vanetti family. He subsequently drops his investigation after the Vanettis attempt to kill his wife and daughter through a car bomb.
Granchio (グランキオ, Grankio)
Voiced by: Shinpachi Tsuji (Japanese); Sean Hennigan (English)
An owner of a speakeasy, located at the Island.
Mad Mack (マッドマック, Maddo Macko)
Voiced by: Atsushi Imaruoka (Japanese); Paul Ramirez (English)
A Mexican hitman hired by an unknown group of people (those who hired him could be either Orco or Frate's henchmen) to take out Nero and Angelo. Though he is extremely powerful, he fails the assassination and gets killed by a farmer.
Martha (マルタ, Maruta)
Voiced by: Sayaka Mazusa (Japanese); Constance Jones (English)
The caretaker that looked after Connie Vanetti when she was ill.
Lacrima (破れ目, Racurima)
Voiced by: Mayumi Asano (Japanese); Janelle Lutz (English)
Fango's mistress, who runs her own shop.
Guccio Baltano (グッチョバルターノ, Guchiio Barutano)
Angelo's friend in orphanage who eventually appears in a bar. He gets killed by Angelo.
Lauro (月桂樹, Rauro)
The newest recruit of the Vanetti family.
Amy (エイミィ, Eimī)
A temporary friend of Angelo that he met in Chicago.
Paul (ポール, Pouru)
Amy's boyfriend.

== Production and release ==
The anime was announced in March 2016. It is directed by Hiro Kaburagi and written by Taku Kishimoto, with animation by the studio Shuka. Tomohiro Kishi is designing the series' characters, and Shōgo Kaida is producing the music. The opening theme song, "Signal", is performed by TK from Ling Tosite Sigure, while the closing theme, "Rain or Shine", is performed by ELISA. The series was broadcast from premiered on 9 July to 1 October 2016 on TBS and also aired on the Animeism programming block on MBS, CBC and BS-TBS. Crunchyroll simulcasted the series, with Funimation handling dubbing and distribution of the series in North America. The series was removed from Crunchyroll in October 2025.

=== Episodes ===
No.	Title (Note: All English titles are taken from Crunchyroll.)	Original release date
1	"Night of the Murder"; Transliteration: "Satsujin no Yoru" (Japanese: 殺人の夜)	9 July 2016
After returning to Lawless district seven years after the massacre of his family, Angelo who now goes by Avilio, gets reacquainted with an old friend and they both dive into a new way of life. Angelo convinces Corteo, his childhood friend, and brother figure, to sell his special booze to the Mob. They try to sell their product to Granchio, owner of the speakeasy located in the so called "The Island" where they eventually meet Fango, Don Orco's new infamous enforcer, who is looking for Nero Vanetti, Don Vanetti's son to exact the revenge of stealing the Orco family's booze. However, due to Fango's lunatic acts, they somehow manage to escape along with two unknown men, whom one of them turn out to be Nero Vanetti.
2	"Phantom of Falsehood"; Transliteration: "Itsuwari no Gen'ei" (Japanese: いつわりの幻影)	16 July 2016
The Vanetti family seeks revenge after the continued compromising of their smuggling routes leads to the death of one of their young runners. Don Vanetti's mansion hosts a wedding between the Don's daughter, Fio, and a man named Ronaldo, but behind the scenes of the grand party, the family feels uneasy. Vanno is eager to avenge Arturo Tronco's death so Angelo decides to help him on the condition to vet him to the clan. Together they plan to kill Fango with Cerotto's help. They fail to kill Fango but they capture his bodyguard, Serpente, which Vanno realizes that his knife is the same knife that Tronco's throat was cut with. Vanno takes Serpente's body to the cemetery that Tronco is buried in and kills him before Tronco's grave, then Angelo appears behind, calling his name and shoots him in the stomach, after revealing who he is and why he did that he kills Vanno. Angelo moves one step closer to completing his revenge. When he returns to Nero and tells a fake story about Vanno's death, Nero gets angry and demands to take him to see his corpse, but when they get there with Barbero, they see that Serpente's body is not there, which brings Angelo into trouble.
3	"Where the Footfalls Lead"; Transliteration: "Ashioto no Ikisaki" (Japanese: 足音の行先)	23 July 2016
Nero gives Angelo a chance to find Serpente's body or he will get killed. Fango asks Don Orco to attack on the Vanettis' turfs together but Don Orco refuses because of the order of the Chicago Outfit. Fango leaves the Orco family and Don Orco plans to kill him. In Cerotto's bar Corteo makes Cerotto confess to what happened to Serpente's corpse in surprise Angelo was there and heard what they said, Angelo threatens Cerotto to tell him what he did and he says that he sold his corpse to Scuza, a corrupt head of Federal Bureau of Prohibition, then Angelo demands him to take him to his corpse. Scuza visits Don Vanetti and offers him for a bribe to hide the crime which is committed by Vanettis, but Don Vanetti demands to see the corpse first. Cerotto takes Angelo to Serpente's corpse under the surveillance of Nero which had been spying on him and Nero had been spied by Fango, Tigre gets beat by Fango and Gatto, his subordinate, to make him confess, while torturing Tigre they hear a window shattered, and get inside with Tigre, seeing Nero gunning down Serpente they decide to exchange them, Fango doubts the blood on Serpente's body and decides to shoot him but he attacks Fango instead, in surprise it was Angelo in Serpente's suit, after a shootout Nero and the others escape. Tensions reach boiling point when the Van‌ettis begin to enact their "retaliation". Frate, Nero's younger brother warns him that he has given an ultimatum afte‌‌r breaking Don Galassia's condition, and tells him to get lost for a while, Angelo recommends to accompany him, though Frate dislikes it but Nero accepts it.
4	"Losing to Win, and What Comes After"; Transliteration: "Makete Katte, Sono Ato de" (Japanese: 敗けて勝って、その後で)	30 July 2016
Angelo and Nero adjust to life on the run while an assassin tails them. During a conversation while camping they confess their feelings about their first respective criminal experiences. Angelo notices a discrepancy between the letter and his memory of the massacre. They head to a town called Khota, where they meet the corrupt cop officer Nick, Nero offers a bribe to tell him about a speakeasy. Barbero informs Nero about the assassin's details as the hitman finds out where he and Angelo are. However, the assassin gets killed by a farmer after some confrontations.
5	"Blood Will Have Blood"; Transliteration: "Chi wa Chi o Yobu" (Japanese: 血は血を呼ぶ)	6 August 2016
Barbero informs Nero that Fango split from Orco, then claimed the island as his turf, and the Orcos call for a truce after failing to take out Fango. The conditions, however, end up being less than favorable for some parties. Nero is making a new brand of moonshine which is given by Barbero's idea with Corteo's intelligence. As Nero comes back to the Vanetti mansion, Frate get his men prepared to kill him, but they fail, thanks to his subordinates' loyalty. Nevertheless, Tigre, gets seriously wounded by the henchmen. Nero and his associates end up in a warehouse, and they need to treat Tigre's wound before he dies, but the Vanettis put the district on lockdown. Ronaldo states that Galassia wants Frate to run the Vanettis or they will lose the alliance with him. Angelo suggests to seek refuge in Fango but Nero refuses. Angelo, however, manages to escape with Corteo and make a deal with Fango for a doctor in payback.
6	"To Slaughter a Pig"; Transliteration: "Buta o Koroshi ni" (Japanese: 豚を殺しに)	13 August 2016
As the Vanetti family's hunt after Nero continues, Nero and his associates move forward with getting rid of Don Orco as per their contract. Somehow, they capture Orco after using a bait of submitting Lawless Heaven to the Orco family. Afterwards, they take him back to Fango as promised, and he dismembers Orco and feeds him to his men. Fango takes over everything Orco had and gets acknowledged by the authorities as the new Don. Angelo talks with Corteo, realising that it was not Orco that sent the letter.
7	"A Poor Player"; Transliteration: "Aware na Yakusha" (Japanese: あわれな役者)	20 August 2016
Nero wants to reunite with the Vanettis, although Fango still wants to continue his dealings with him, but Nero feels unsafe around Fango as he is suspecting a betrayal looms. Increasing pressure from Ronaldo and a nudge from Angelo causes a schism within the Vanetti clan by trying to assassinate Ronaldo with Volpe without Nero's knowledge and They failed the assassination. Angelo kills Volpe somewhere near Vanetti's turfs. After Frate and his men find the car with only Volpe in it, Frate believes that Nero set the plan. Frate sends a message to Nero by hanging Volpe's body on Lawless bridge. Internal war begins between Frate supported by the Galassia family and Nero supported by Fango. Frate's men decide to rebel and serve under Nero instead of him, which makes it clear that Nero is the winner. Nevertheless, Fio gets pregnant. Ronaldo attempts to take out Nero, but Fio kills him to save his brother. Nero tells Frate to leave the country in order to stay safe, Frate confesses that whatever he did was to earn his father's respect. Angelo manipulates them which leads to Frate's death by Nero's hand. Afterwards, they pretend as Frate killed Ronaldo, then Nero killed Frate to prove his loyalty to the Galassias. Fio leaves her "Mob" family with her unborn child.
7.5	"Brief Candle"; Transliteration: "Mijikai Rōsoku" (Japanese: 短いローソク)	27 August 2016
A recap of the previous episodes.
8	"Behind the Curtain"; Transliteration: "Tobari no Kage" (Japanese: 帳の陰)	3 September 2016
With Frate dead, Nero remains as the only Vanetti and he vows to do anything for the survival of his father's Empire. The new head of the Bureau of Prohibition cracks down on the feuding families. Fango aims to crush the Vanettis. Angelo wants to isolate himself from Corteo, but Corteo instead decides to inform Fango about Vanetti's plans in order to get rid of Nero. After Delphy starts to investigate the Lodge (Nero's factory of Lawless Heaven brand), given the information by Fango, Nero warns him several times, but Delphy does not step down, so Nero orders to take out his family. Delphy's family does not die but the assassination attempt extremely frightens Delphy which makes him leave his duty. Fango uses Corteo's betrayal to kill Nero but he fails all the times. After Fango owns Lawless Heaven from the seize of Scuza, he tries to tell the Vanettis who the traitor is, but Corteo beats him to death.
9	"Black and Deep Desires"; Transliteration: "Kurozun da Yabō" (Japanese: 黒ずんだ野望)	10 September 2016
While Corteo tries to catch the train to escape from Lawless. some henchmen capture him. The next day, they call Angelo attend the Vanetti mansion, where they torture Corteo to confess why he sold out Nero, but he stays quiet. As Fango is no more, his executives plan to join the Vanettis. Somehow, Corteo vanishes, and the Vanettis put Lawless on lockdown to find him but they get nothing. At the Middle of the night Corteo calls Angelo for help which is blackmailed by an unknown person to force Angelo to kill Nero. Vincent gives the Don's rank to his son, Nero. Nero plans to expand His booze market across Illinois by negotiating with the Galassias. Angelo deduces the identity of the man who sent the letter.
10	"Proof of Good Faith"; Transliteration: "Seijitsu no Akashi" (Japanese: 誠実の証)	17 September 2016
Angelo and Ganzo discuss motives, leverage and future plans shortly before Angelo revisits his hometown en route to a business deal with the Galassias in Chicago. Barbero finds out that Corteo was with Angelo when he left on the ship, so Ganzo calls Corteo to come back and save Angelo from death. Don Nero Vanetti calls Angelo for interrogation, and even orders the guards to inspect him before entering the Vanetti Mansion. In the middle of the interrogation Corteo smashs into Nero's office and explains why he betrayed Nero. Nero orders Angelo to kill Corteo to prove his loyalty.
11	"All for Nothing"; Transliteration: "Subete ga Muda-Goto" (Japanese: すべてがむだごと)	24 September 2016
Don Galassia and his nephew, Strega, arrive in Lawless for the grand opening of the Vanetti playhouse as final preparations are made for the big show. The plot does not go as planned because Ganzo's assassins fail to kill Del Toro, even after Angelo kills Del Toro, Barbero and Tigre spot him and take him to the basement to interrogate him, and they find out about the letter. However, Tigre tries to warn Nero and Ganzo, but Barbero refuses and tells him to only warn Ganzo. After he comes, Somehow, he manages to kill Barbero and release Angelo, then acts like Angelo made his way out and killed Barbero. Ganzo gives the letter to Nero to let him know who "Avilio" is in reality. Nero tries to stop him but he is unable. After lots of struggle to get to Vincent and Galassia, Angelo kills Galassia to prompt Strega to perish the Vanettis. The rule of the Vanetti family begins to end. Vincent dies in Nero's arms with his last words: "Nero, all of this was for nothing my boy". Outside the opera house, Angelo collapses in an alleyway from bloodloss.
12	"Slipping Through the Dirty Sky"; Transliteration: "Yogore ta Sora o Kaikuguri" (Japanese: 汚れた空をかいくぐり)	1 October 2016
Strega's men kill every Vanetti in sight and the Vanettis are not strong enough to survive the war, leading to a series of explosions on the island. Nero finds out where Angelo is and kidnaps him from Strega's bodyguards from a hotel. After explaining everything to Nero, they leave Lawless with Cerotto and Nero takes this opportunity to steal his car. Angelo and Nero take a trip to see the Atlantic Ocean against a backdrop of warring families and a dying empire. Nero asks Angelo if he is satisfied with his revenge, to which Angelo replies that it did not give him the "raison d'etre" that he hoped for and it was all for nothing. Nero reminded of his father's last words becomes enraged and beats Angelo and asks why he did not kill him, to which Angelo responds that Nero should have killed him on the night of his family's massacre. In a flashback, before the island explosions, we see that Angelo was picked up from the allyway by Strega and patched up. Strega Angelo explains he killed Galassia to spark a war between both sides in order to annihilate the Vannetis. Strega then gives Angelo an offer to eliminate a "certain someone" (likely Nero) to become part of the family, to which Angelo says he does not care anymore. After spending a few days travelling and trying to find a reason to forgive each other, Angelo tells Nero that the only reason he is alive is because he did not want to kill him. After hearing this Nero shoots Angelo in the back and leaves him on the beach, Angelo's fate left ambiguous.
OVA	"Shoal of Time"; Transliteration: "Jikan no asase" (Japanese: 時の浅瀬)	5 July 2017
Three short flashback stories featuring Nero as an adolescent with his siblings and Vanno, Vincenzo Vanetti being made in the Moreno crime family, and Angelo tending to a sick Nero while on the run.

=== Extra episodes ===
91 Daze is a series of short episodes featuring the main characters in comedic sketches. These chibi-styled extras were released alongside the DVD and Blu-ray volumes of 91 Days.

Title	Volume
"Assassin" (刺客, Shikaku)	Volume 2
"Taste Test" (味見, Ajimi)	Volume 3
"Misunderstanding" (勘違い, Kanchigai)	Volume 4
"Rage" (怒り, Ikari)	Volume 5
"Rain" (雨, Ame)	Volume 6
"Meal" (食事, Shokuji)	Volume 7
"Sleep-Talking" (寝言, Negoto)	Volume 7
