= Bofuri =

Japanese light novel series and its franchise

- Bofuri: I Don't Want to Get Hurt, so I'll Max Out My Defense (Note: The official English title is Bofuri: I Don't Want to Get Hurt, so I'll Max Out My Defense.)
- First light novel volume cover, featuring Kaede Honjou as Maple

痛いのは嫌なので防御力に極振りしたいと思います。 (Itai no wa Iya nano de Bōgyoryoku ni Kyokufuri Shitai to Omoimasu)
- Genre: Comedy
- Novel series
- Written by: Yuumikan
- Published by: Shōsetsuka ni Narō
- Original run: May 24, 2016 – February 20, 2025
- Light novel
- Written by: Yuumikan
- Illustrated by: Koin
- Published by: Fujimi Shobo
- English publisher: NA: Yen Press
- Imprint: Kadokawa Books
- Original run: September 8, 2017 – present
- Volumes: 19 (Note: +3 Side Story volumes)
- Manga
- Written by: Yuumikan
- Illustrated by: Jirō Oimoto
- Published by: Kadokawa Shoten
- English publisher: NA: Yen Press
- Magazine: Comp Ace
- Original run: May 26, 2018 – present
- Volumes: 8
- Anime television series
- Directed by: Shin Oonuma; Mirai Minato (S1)
- Produced by: Kentarou Inoue; Satoru Shimosato; Kenichi Tokumura; Kazusa Umeda; Soujirou Arimizu (S1); Kousuke Arai (S1); Noritomo Isogai (S1); Kousei Kawamoto (S1); Takumi Morii (S1); Masao Oohashi (S1); Naruki Fukuya (S2); Takayoshi Ishiguro (S2); Hayato Kaneko (S2); Sora Kimura (S2); Chiho Shibayama (S2)
- Written by: Fumihiko Shimo
- Music by: Taro Masuda
- Studio: Silver Link
- Licensed by: Crunchyroll (Note: In North America through Crunchyroll, LLC (formerly known as Funimation).); SA/SEA: Muse Communication
- Original network: AT-X, ABC TV, Tokyo MX, TVA, BS11
- English network: US: Crunchyroll Channel
- Original run: January 8, 2020 – April 19, 2023
- Episodes: 24
- icon

Bofuri: I Don't Want to Get Hurt, so I'll Max Out My Defense (Japanese: 痛いのは嫌なので防御力に極振りしたいと思います。, Hepburn: Itai no wa Iya nano de Bōgyoryoku ni Kyokufuri Shitai to Omoimasu; "I Don't Want to Get Hurt, so I'd Like to Maximize My Defensive Power") is a Japanese light novel series written by Yuumikan and illustrated by Koin. It was initially serialized online on the user-generated novel publishing website Shōsetsuka ni Narō from May 2016 to February 2025. It was acquired by Fujimi Shobo, which published the first light novel volume in September 2017 under their Kadokawa Books imprint. 19 volumes have been released as of March 2025.

A manga adaptation with art by Jirō Oimoto has been serialized in Kadokawa Shoten's seinen manga magazine Comp Ace since May 2018, and collected in eight tankōbon volumes. Both the light novel and manga have been licensed in North America by Yen Press. An anime television series adaptation produced by Silver Link aired from January to March 2020. A second season aired from January to April 2023.

== Plot ==
Urged on by her friend, Kaede Honjou begins playing the VRMMORPG NewWorld Online under the name Maple. Not wanting to get hurt, Maple opts to be a shield user with maxed-out defense stats, and continues putting every status point she earns in the game into increasing only her defense level. As a result, she is left with slow foot speed and no magic, but her high defense allows her to endure most hits without taking any damage. This, along with her basic-level creative thinking, allows for her to make unexpected accomplishments in the game, its quests and events. By doing this, she ends up earning all kinds of equally unexpected skills and becomes one of the strongest players in the game.

== Characters ==
=== Maple Tree ===
Maple (メイプル, Meipuru) / Kaede Honjou (本条 楓, Honjō Kaede)
Voiced by: Kaede Hondo (Japanese); Megan Shipman (English)
A young girl who has just started playing NewWorld Online. Since she does not like to get hurt, she puts every skill point she earns into boosting her defense, allowing her to acquire new skills and level up simply by withstanding attacks. Even with her lack of gaming experience, Maple remarkably gains enough resistance to almost anything and seems to have innate luck in locating rare items, hidden dungeons, and unique quests and skills. This gives the game admins many headaches as they try to devise ways to slow her down; to which, her unorthodox methods overcome the developers' adjustments. In the first event, she becomes the third-ranked player after defeating over 2,000 players. During the second event, she finds a monster egg which later hatches into a turtle, which she names Syrup. Due to her high defense, she has been nicknamed "the Walking Fortress" by other players. She is the guild master of Maple Tree.
Sally (サリー, Sarī) / Risa Shiromine (白峯 理沙, Shiromine Risa)
Voiced by: Ruriko Noguchi (Japanese); Jad Saxton (English)
Kaede's real-life friend who introduced her to NewWorld Online. She plays the swashbuckler class, which specializes in evasion and high-speed offense. Risa previously won a championship online game reward; all the trophies in her room, as well as gaming knowledge, hint that she is a pro gamer. She had to join Maple late in the game because her mother forbade her from gaming, wanting her to pass her proficiency exams. Sally could also be described as a genius tactician as she seems to always be able to develop plans to lead her guildmates to victory and how to best use Maple's bizarre skills. She has a strong fear of ghosts; Maple jokes she could not handle haunted houses despite being in-game. During the second event, Sally found a monster egg which later hatches into a fox she named Oboro. After annihilating many players on the final day of the second event, she earned the moniker of "Untouchable Blue Monster".
Kasumi (カスミ)
Voiced by: Saori Hayami (Japanese); Tia Ballard (English)
A samurai whose speed is on par with Sally. She was ranked sixth in the first event. The Flame Emperor guild intended to recruit her, but Maple got to her first. She and the Flame Emperor's Split-Sword Shin have faced each other multiple times in the past and she defeated him every time.
Kanade (カナデ)
Voiced by: Satomi Arai (Japanese); Brittney Karbowski (English)
An androgynous male mage player, who specializes in intel gathering and puzzle solving, which allows him to access secret places and items in the game. He uses a Rubik's Cube-like staff called the "Akashic Records," which grants him a random skill each day. He also has a library of spells that he can prepare ahead of time.
Kuromu (クロム)
Voiced by: Noriaki Sugiyama (Japanese); Anthony Bowling (English)
A great shielder like Maple and one of the first players that Maple meets in the game. He is recognized as a top player, having ranked ninth in the first event. He usually hangs out with Iz. He later gains the "Undead Lord" gear after soloing a hidden dungeon designed for players who have died and revived a certain number of times. He is usually involved in the game chat where the chat presses him for information about Maple. It is implied he is the oldest among the guild as he states he has to act as the girls' big brother and protector just to make sure no one takes advantage of them.
Iz (イズ, Izu)
Voiced by: Satomi Satō (Japanese); Caitlin Glass (English)
A crafter who creates made-to-order equipment. She becomes the guilds crafter, but still accepts private commissions. Being in the guild inspires her to craft unique gear, an opportunity she never was given originally. She usually hangs out with Kuromu. In battle, she specializes in demolition equipping herself with various explosives; she also uses a pickaxe for close range.
Mai (マイ)
Voiced by: Ai Kakuma (Japanese); Sara Ragsdale (English)
A rookie player who, unlike Maple, put all of her skill points into strength instead. This allows her to wield heavy weapons and deal maximum damage. She wears a green ribbon in her black hair and wields two giant hammers with the same color scheme. Many of her skills were earned in boss rushes and time trials.
Yui (ユイ)
Voiced by: Nanaka Suwa (Japanese); Kristen McGuire (English)
Mai's younger sister, who put all of her skill points into strength, much like Mai. Her hair is white with a pink ribbon and her hammers are also the same color as her hair. Like her twin sister, her skills are earned through boss rushes and time trials, which allows her to wield heavier weapons and deal maximum damage.
Syrup (シロップ, Shiroppu)
Voiced by: Miyuri Shimabukuro (Japanese); Natalie Hoover (English)
Maple's turtle familiar, whose egg was awarded to her after Maple and Sally defeated the Silverwing boss. After the second event, Maple uses her rewards to allow Syrup to grow in size using the Metamorph skill, as well as fly by means of Maple equipping herself with the Psychokinesis skill. Ironically, Syrup's mobility is far superior than Maple due to her zero agility. Syrup is used as the guild's form of transportation as a flying fortress. It can only say the word "Kame" (カメ, turtle).
Oboro (朧)
Voiced by: Akiha Matsui (Japanese); Samantha Herek (English)
Sally's fox familiar, whose egg was awarded to her after Maple and Sally defeated the Silverwing boss. Oboro specializes in speed and fire spells. She also has the ability to split Sally into shadow clones.

=== Order of the Holy Sword ===
Payne (ペイン, Pein)
Voiced by: Kensho Ono (Japanese); Clifford Chapin (English)
A swordsman who is the Order of the Holy Sword's guild master and NewWorld Online's top player with the highest level in the game.
Dread (ドレッド, Doreddo)
Voiced by: Takumi Yamazaki (Japanese); Mike McFarland (English)
An assassin type and the second-ranked player in the first event. Like Sally, he acts as a high speed attacker.
Frederica (フレデリカ, Furederika)
Voiced by: Ayana Taketatsu (Japanese); Lindsay Seidel (English)
A magician and one of the first users Maple meets in the game, giving Maple advice on how to level up. She later develops a friendly rivalry with Sally. She is also the guild's information gatherer.
Drag (ドラグ, Doragu)
Voiced by: Nobutoshi Canna (Japanese); Jarrod Greene (English)
A warrior type axeman who is the fifth-ranked player in the first event. He excels in brute force attacks.

=== Flame Emperor ===
Mii (ミィ, Mī)
Voiced by: Rina Satō (Japanese); Terri Doty (English)
Nicknamed "Flame Empress", she is a high ranking mage and the Flame Emperor's guild master. She is considered one of the most powerful and charismatic players and one of the few players who could compete with Payne in combat. While she usually acts cool and confident, she became flustered after being beaten by Maple.
Shin (シン)
Voiced by: Kappei Yamaguchi (Japanese); Derick Snow (English)
Nicknamed "Split-Sword", due to his special skill of splitting his sword's blade into multiple projectiles. He fought Kasumi several times in the past and lost. Originally, he wanted to recruit her to the Flame Emperor, but Maple recruited her first.
Marx (マルクス, Marukusu)
Voiced by: Akira Ishida (Japanese); Aaron Dismuke (English)
The guild's Trap Master.
Misery (ミザリー, Mizarī)
Voiced by: Yūko Minaguchi (Japanese); Morgan Lauré Garrett (English)
The healer of the Guild. She is popular within the guild for her skill and beauty.

=== NewWorld Online (NWO) ===
The Administrators
A boardroom consisting of developers, designers, and programmers. This group is constantly driven crazy by Maple's shenanigans and describe her as "more of a last boss than their last boss". They constantly struggle to make adjustments to compensate for Maple, only to be thwarted by her unorthodox strategies and creative playstyle as well as her absurdly good luck.
Dorazou (ドラぞう, Dorazō)
Voiced by: Sakura Tange (Japanese); Monica Rial (English)
NewWorld Online's little dragon mascot exclusive to the anime, who acts as host to the various player events.

== Media ==
=== Light novels ===
The series originally began on the user-generated novel publishing website Shōsetsuka ni Narō by Yuumikan on May 24, 2016, being viewed more than 60 million times on the site. The web novel published its final chapter on February 20, 2025. The following year, the series was acquired by publisher Fujimi Shobo to be published as a light novel with illustrations by Koin on the Kadokawa Books imprint, with the first volume being released in September 2017. The light novel is licensed in North America by Yen Press.

==== Volumes ====
No.	Original release date	Original ISBN	English release date	English ISBN
1	September 8, 2017	978-4-04-072441-6	April 6, 2021	978-1-9753-2273-1
2	December 10, 2017	978-4-04-072443-0	June 29, 2021	978-1-9753-2354-7
3	April 10, 2018	978-4-04-072688-5	October 5, 2021	978-1-9753-2356-1
4	August 10, 2018	978-4-04-072697-7	January 18, 2022	978-1-9753-2358-5
5	December 10, 2018	978-4-04-072698-4	May 10, 2022	978-1-9753-2360-8
6	April 10, 2019	978-4-04-073115-5	August 16, 2022	978-1-9753-2362-2
7	August 9, 2019	978-4-04-073116-2	October 18, 2022	978-1-9753-2364-6
8	December 10, 2019	978-4-04-073117-9	February 21, 2023	978-1-9753-2366-0
9	March 10, 2020	978-4-04-073118-6	May 23, 2023	978-1-9753-2369-1
10	August 7, 2020	978-4-04-073759-1	September 19, 2023	978-1-9753-6768-8
11	January 9, 2021	978-4-04-073760-7; 978-4-04-073891-8 (SE)	December 12, 2023	978-1-9753-6770-1
12	August 10, 2021	978-4-04-074129-1	April 16, 2024	978-1-9753-6772-5
13	March 10, 2022	978-4-04-074131-4; 978-4-04-074365-3 (SE)	July 23, 2024	978-1-9753-6774-9
14	August 10, 2022	978-4-04-074630-2	October 15, 2024	978-1-9753-9144-7
15	January 10, 2023	978-4-04-074812-2; 978-4-04-074813-9 (SE)	February 18, 2025	978-1-9753-9146-1
16	August 10, 2023	978-4-04-075096-5	August 12, 2025	979-8-8554-0124-0
17	March 8, 2024	978-4-04-075348-5	April 14, 2026	979-8-8554-2067-8
18	August 9, 2024	978-4-04-075565-6	October 13, 2026	979-8-8554-2069-2
19	March 10, 2025	978-4-04-075848-0	April 13, 2027	979-8-8554-4828-3
SS1	September 10, 2025	978-4-04-075971-5; 978-4-04-076100-8 (SE)	—	—
SS2	March 10, 2026	978-4-04-076331-6	—	—
SS3	September 10, 2026	978-4-04-076556-3	—	—

=== Manga ===
A manga adaptation by Jirō Oimoto began serialization on the seinen magazine Comp Ace by publisher Kadokawa Shoten in May 2018. The manga is also licensed by Yen Press.

==== Volumes ====
No.	Original release date	Original ISBN	English release date	English ISBN
1	November 24, 2018	978-4-04-107718-4	May 4, 2021	978-1-9753-2386-8
2	August 26, 2019	978-4-04-108577-6	December 7, 2021	978-1-9753-2388-2
3	February 22, 2020	978-4-04-108578-3	January 18, 2022	978-1-9753-2390-5
4	January 26, 2021	978-4-04-110920-5	June 7, 2022	978-1-9753-4274-6
5	October 26, 2021	978-4-04-111912-9	November 22, 2022	978-1-9753-4948-6
6	August 26, 2022	978-4-04-111913-6	May 23, 2023	978-1-9753-6913-2
7	February 25, 2023	978-4-04-113329-3	December 12, 2023	978-1-9753-7476-1
8	November 25, 2023	978-4-04-114355-1	November 19, 2024	979-8-8554-0083-0

=== Anime ===
An anime adaptation was announced by Kadokawa on December 6, 2018. The series was animated by Silver Link, and directed by Shin Oonuma and Mirai Minato, with Fumihiko Shimo handling series composition, and Kazuya Hirata designing the characters. The series aired from January 8 to March 25, 2020, on AT-X, ABC, Tokyo MX, TVA, and BS11. Afilia Saga performed the opening theme "Kyūkyoku Unbalance" (究極アンバランス!), while Rico Sasaki performed the ending theme "Play the World." It ran for 12 episodes.

Funimation had previously streamed the series. Following Sony's acquisition of Crunchyroll, the series was moved to Crunchyroll. Muse Communication streamed the series on its Muse Asia YouTube channel in Southeast Asia and South Asia.

A second season of the anime was announced at the end of the first season's final episode, and was originally scheduled to air in 2022, but was later delayed. It aired from January 11 to April 19, 2023. Junjō no Afilia performed the opening theme "Kono Tate ni, Kakuremasu" (この盾に、隠れます。), while FRAM performed the ending theme "Step for Joy". On February 13, 2023, the official anime website announced the seventh episode of the season and beyond would be delayed by two weeks till March 8, 2023. The animation staff announced on March 29, 2023, that they scheduled the 11th and 12th episodes for April 12 and 19, to maintain the quality of the footage.

=== Games ===
A free-to-play mobile game titled Itai no wa Iya nano de Bōgyoryoku ni Kyokufuri Shitai to Omoimasu: Line Wars! (痛いのは嫌なので防御力に極振りしたいと思います。 ～らいんうぉーず！～) was released for iOS and Android devices on January 9, 2020. It ended service on September 21, 2021.

A pachislot machine by Sammy Corporation was released in 2024.

== Reception ==
The web novel version of the story on Shōsetsuka ni Narō has over 60 million views since its original publication on the site.

== See also ==
- Nyaruko: Crawling with Love, another light novel series illustrated by Koin
