= Unicorn Table =

Japanese band

- Origin: Japan
- Genres: J-Pop
- Years active: 2001–present
- Label: TenBu Productions
- Members: Salia, Shin-Go

Unicorn Table is a band created in 2001 by Japanese pop singer Salia and composer and guitarist Shin-Go. They have created songs for several anime, which are influenced by electronic instruments and dance beats with a mix of alternative rock.

Salia became known in the J-pop field for singing songs of Cutey Honey Flash, Vandread and the tokusatsu series Hyakujuu Sentai Gaoranger. She was also a member of The Funny Stones before founding Unicorn Table.

Besides playing the guitar and composing music, Shin'go is also a producer. He has been involved in soundtracks to anime like Casshan, Solty Rei, and Pumpkin Scissors.

Their first album, "uncountable", was released both in Japan and in the United States by TenBu Productions. In fact, the band's name came from the pronunciation of the word "uncountable" in Japanese, similar do "Unicorn Table".

They are also known by "Fly Away", a song from the anime Jinki: Extend; and "Closer", "Distant Love", "Infinity" and "Amai Yum", from School Rumble.

The duo has performed at many festivals in Japan, as well as at Tora-Con, in Rochester, New York, USA; and at SANA, in Fortaleza, Brazil.
