= Elisa (Japanese singer) =

Japanese pop singer (born 1989)

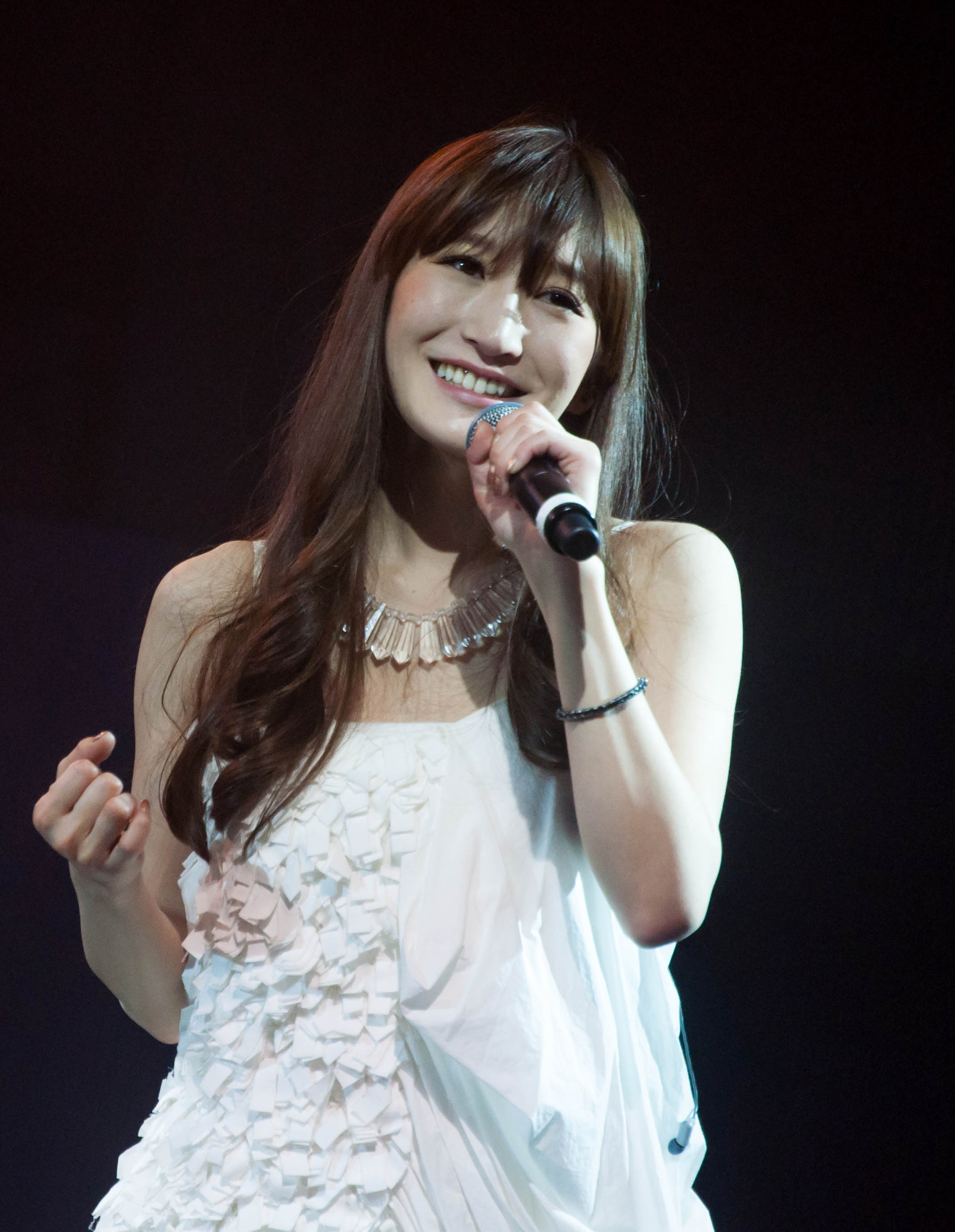
- Elisa at SakuraCon 2014
- Born: April 14, 1989 (age 37); Kanagawa Prefecture, Japan
- Occupations: Singer; fashion model
- Years active: 2007–present
- Musical career
- Genres: Pop; progressive rock
- Labels: Geneon Universal (2007–2012); SME Records (2013–2017); Sacra Music (2017–2021)
- Website: www.elisa-smile.com

Elisa (born April 14, 1989), real name Elisa Tsubuyaki, is a female Japanese singer from Kanagawa Prefecture. She was signed to Sacra Music until 2021 when her contract expired.

== Biography ==
=== Music career ===
In 2007, Elisa was chosen from a contest of 3,000 participants at Elite Model Look to become a professional model. In the same year, she also signed a contract with Geneon Universal as a singer. In October 2007, she debuted with her single "Euphoric Field", which was used as the opening theme song for the anime series Ef: A Tale of Memories.

In 2011, it was announced by her agency that she would be putting her career on hold due to fatigue. Her concert that was scheduled for October 2 of that year at the Tokyo Globe-za theater, as well as all other scheduled concerts and events were cancelled, and her Twitter page was deleted. Despite her hiatus, she released a "best-of" album on June 20, 2012.

In January 2013, Elisa announced that she would resume her singing career under her new label, SME Records. She also opened a new Twitter account. She also released a new single, titled "Shout my Heart", which was bundled with the 12th volume of LisAni magazine.

In April 2014, Elisa made her U.S. performance debut in Seattle, Washington at Sakura-Con. She released the single "Millenario" on April 30, 2014; the title track is used as the first ending theme to the 2014 anime television series The Irregular at Magic High School. She released the single "Eonian" on November 12, 2014; the title track is used as the theme song to the 2014 animated film Expelled from Paradise.

Elisa released the single "Rain or Shine" on August 31, 2016; the title track is used as the ending theme to the 2016 anime television series 91 Days She released two albums in 2016: Anichro, released on March 23, and Genetica, released on November 30. Elisa moved to the Sacra Music record label under Sony Music Entertainment Japan in April 2017. She released her latest song in 2020, Hikari no Hoshi.

In September 2020, Elisa was allegedly sexually harassed by her manager. She terminated her contract with Smile Company.

== Discography ==
=== Albums ===
No.	Information	Sales
1	White Pulsation: Released: January 21, 2009; Oricon top 200 position: 30	8,561
2	Rouge Adolescence: Released: January 20, 2010	
3	Lasei: Released: February 16, 2011	
4	Rainbow Pulsation: The Best of Elisa: Released: June 20, 2012	
5	As Life: Released: June 25, 2014	
6	Anichro: Released: March 23, 2016	
7	Genetica: Released: November 30, 2016	

=== Maxi singles ===
No.	Information	Sales
1	Euphoric field: Released: October 24, 2007; Oricon top 200 position: 22; Theme song from: Ef - A Tale of Memories	24,572
2	Hikari: Released: May 21, 2008; Oricon top 200 position: 74; Ending theme song from: Nabari no Ou	2,662
3	Ebullient Future: Released: November 5, 2008; Oricon top 200 position: 17; Opening theme song from: Ef - A Tale of Melodies	14,512
4	Wonder Wind: Released: May 20, 2009; Oricon top 200 position: 21; Opening theme song from: Hayate the Combat Butler Second Season	8,653
5	Dear My Friend: Mada Minu Mirai e: Released: November 4, 2009; Oricon top 200 position: 22; Ending theme song from: A Certain Scientific Railgun	10,597
6	Real Force: Released: February 24, 2010; Oricon top 200 position: 14; Ending theme song from: A Certain Scientific Railgun	
7	Special "One": Released: October 27, 2010; Oricon top 200 position: 23; Ending theme song from: A Certain Scientific Railgun OAV	
8	Invisible Message: Released: August 31, 2011; Ending theme song from: Hayate the Combat Butler! Heaven Is a Place on Earth	
9	I'm by your side: Released: June 19, 2013; Ending theme song from: Valvrave the Liberator	
10	Realism: Released: October 23, 2013; Ending theme song from: Valvrave the Liberator	
11	Millenario: Released: April 30, 2014; Ending theme song from: The Irregular at Magic High School	
12	Eonian: Released: November 12, 2014; Ending theme song from: Expelled from Paradise	
13	Rain or Shine: Released: August 31, 2016; Ending theme song from: 91 Days	
14	Wish: Released: May 2, 2018; Ending theme song from: The Legend of the Galactic Heroes: Die Neue These Kaikō	

== Live performances ==
- Animax Musix Spring 2010 (May 15, 2010)
- Elisa First Live: Feel the Pulsation (March 28, 2009)
- Animelo Summer Live 2008 (August 31, 2008)
- Animelo Summer Live 2009 (August 22, 2009)
- Animelo Summer Live 2010 (August 28, 2010)
- Animelo Summer Live 2011 (August 27, 2011)
- Anime Festival Asia 2013 (November 11, 2013)
- Sakura-Con 2014 (April 19, 2014)
- Animax Carnival Malaysia 2015 (March 28, 2015)
- AnimeNEXT 2015 (June 14, 2015)
- Animax Carnival Philippines 2016 (October 15, 2016)
- Anime Expo Lite x LisAni! 2020 (July 4, 2020)
