= Earthmind =

- Type: Non-profit association
- Industry: nature conservation
- Founded: 2006
- Founder: Francis Vorhies
- Headquarters: Gland, Switzerland
- Number of locations: IUCN Conservation Centre

Earthmind is a not-for-profit association based at the International Union for Conservation of Nature Conservation Centre in Gland, Switzerland. Its sister organisation is a French EURL founded in 2010 and based in Divonne-les-Bains, France.

Earthmind brings together a network of independent professional associates and consultants who operate in the field of sustainable development and biodiversity conservation. Earthmind works with clients and partners in the private, public and non-governmental organization sectors on various projects promoting sustainability, primarily with respect to biodiversity.

== Programmes ==
Earthmind's work is organised under three broad programmes:

=== Biodiversity Advisory Services ===
In partnering with various private companies, on-governmental and governmental organisations, Earthmind seeks to find the common ground between business and biodiversity. Initiatives have included co-authoring a joint International Union for Conservation of Nature/Shell Oil Company study on building biodiversity business, supporting the United Nations Conference on Trade and Development BioTrade Initiative, and the European Union Business and support to the Biodiversity Platform. Recent assignments have included lender audits of corporate biodiversity assessments and plans with respect to Performance Standard 6 of the International Finance Corporation.

=== Verified Conservation Areas ===
Earthmind has developed and manages a new approach to supporting private area-based conservation. Verified Conservation Areas recognise conservation where people live and work.

=== Wild Trade ===
Earthmind's newest programme focuses on the sustainable trade in wild goods and services in support of the United Nations Sustainable Development Goals.

== Associates ==
A network of Associates undertake Earthmind work on a contractual or voluntary basis. They help to organise and contribute to Earthmind's projects and also advise on new directions for Earthmind's areas of work. The network includes experienced senior associates, academic research associates, and junior associates (interns).
