= Tora-Con =

Anime convention in Rochester, New York

Coordinates: 43°05′03.9″N 77°40′29.8″W

- Status: Active
- Genre: Anime, manga, Japanese culture, sci-fi, and fantasy
- Venue: Rochester Institute of Technology
- Location: Rochester, New York
- Country: United States
- Inaugurated: 2005
- Attendance: 2,999 in 2019
- Organizer: RIT Anime Club
- Website: toracon.org

Tora-Con is an annual two-day anime convention held during March or April at the Rochester Institute of Technology in Rochester, New York. The convention's name comes from the Japanese word 'tora' meaning tiger and is organized by the Rochester Institute of Technology Anime Club. The event is family friendly.

== Programming ==
The convention typically offers an animated music video contest, anime showings, artists alley, concerts, contests, cosplay chess tournament, cosplay contest, cosplay dating game, dances, gaming tournaments, iron cosplay, panels, and performances. Proceeds from the convention also benefit local groups such as the Greece Residents Assisting Stray Pets, and other functions on campus.

== History ==
Tora-Con was founded to raise money for the anime club. They hit an attendance capacity of 2,500 in 2010 and had to close registration. The convention celebrated its 10th anniversary in 2014. In 2014, the event expanded to additional parts of campus and capped attendance at 3,000 people. Tora-Con 2020 was cancelled due to the COVID-19 pandemic. Tora-Con held a virtual convention in 2021 due to the COVID-19 pandemic. Due to the reduction of storage space on the RIT campus, questions about the future of the convention were raised in 2025.

=== Event history ===
Dates	Location	Atten.	Guests
April 16, 2005	Rochester Institute of Technology; Rochester, New York		Rukis Croax, Luke Morgan, and Yuko "Aido" Ota.
April 22, 2006	Rochester Institute of Technology; Rochester, New York		Pine*am
April 28, 2007	Rochester Institute of Technology; Rochester, New York	625	Cosplay Crack Crew, Geek Comedy Tour, Sonny Strait, and Stephanie Yanez.
April 26, 2008	Rochester Institute of Technology; Rochester, New York		Austell "DJ Asu" Callwood, Geek Comedy Tour, Carrie Savage, and Unicorn Table.
April 25, 2009	Rochester Institute of Technology; Rochester, New York	1,481	Armcannon, Colleen Clinkenbeard, Geek Comedy Tour, Todd Haberkorn, Vic Mignogna, and John Swasey.
April 24–25, 2010	Rochester Institute of Technology; Rochester, New York	2,500	Armcannon, Johnny Yong Bosch, Eyeshine, Geek Comedy Tour, Gavin Goszka, Yuko "Aido" Ota, Ananth Panagariya, Michael Poe, Monica Rial, Christopher Sabat, Adam Smithee, Eric Vale, and Billy West.
April 16–17, 2011	Rochester Institute of Technology; Rochester, New York		Chris Cason, Richard Epcar, Geek Comedy Tour, Brina Palencia, Chris Rager, Ellyn Stern, Uncle Yo.
April 20–22, 2012	Rochester Institute of Technology; Rochester, New York		Alfred State Jesters, The Asterplace, Leah Clark, Caitlin Glass, Kyle Hebert, Jamie Marchi, Trina Nishimura, Jon St. John, J. Michael Tatum, and Uncle Yo.
March 23–24, 2013	Rochester Institute of Technology; Rochester, New York	2,600	Todd Haberkorn, Cherami Leigh, Mike McFarland, Powerglove, Monica Rial, and John Swasey.
March 8–9, 2014	Rochester Institute of Technology; Rochester, New York	3,000 (est)	Tia Ballard, Colleen Clinkenbeard, Scott Freeman, Aki Glancy, Jessie James Grelle, Chuck Huber, Brittany Lauda, Rare Candy, Symphony Anime Orchestra, Alexis Tipton, Uncle Yo, and Lara Woodhull.
April 18–19, 2015	Rochester Institute of Technology; Rochester, New York		Armcannon, Chalk Twins, Geek Comedy Tour, Jessie James Grelle, Cherami Leigh, and Chris Rager.
April 23-24, 2016	Rochester Institute of Technology; Rochester, New York		Bryn Apprill, Steve Blum, Chalk Twins, Clifford Chapin, Richard Epcar, Todd Haberkorn, and Uncle Yo.
April 22-23, 2017	Rochester Institute of Technology; Rochester, New York	3,234	Chalk Twins, Digitrevx, Aki Glancy, Erika Harlacher, Erica Lindbeck, Laura Post, David Vincent, and Lex Winter.
April 14-15, 2018	Rochester Institute of Technology; Rochester, New York	3,197	Felecia Angelle, Bit Brigade, Justin Briner, Danimal Cannon, Chalk Twins, Clifford Chapin, Digitrevx, Aki Glancy, Shigeto Koyama, Uncle Yo, Eric Vale, Hiromi Wakabayashi, and Lex Winter.
March 23-24, 2019	Rochester Institute of Technology; Rochester, New York	2,999	Brian Beacock, Chalk Twins, Aki Glancy, Hanyaan, Brittany Lauda, The Manly Battleships, Kristen McGuire, Matt Shipman, Ian Sinclair, and Uncle Yo.
March 20-21, 2021	Online convention		
March 19, 2022	Rochester Institute of Technology; Rochester, New York		Corina Boettger, Chalk Twins, and Emi Lo.
March 4-5, 2023	Rochester Institute of Technology; Rochester, New York		Chalk Twins, James Landino, Shihori Nakane, and Lex Winter.
March 23-24, 2024	Rochester Institute of Technology; Rochester, New York		Chalk Twins, Lizzie Freeman, Adam Gibbs, Anjali Kunapaneni, Landon McDonald, and Molly Zhang.
March 22-23, 2025	Rochester Institute of Technology; Rochester, New York		A.J. Beckles, Chalk Twins, ChibiTifa, Allegra Clark, Aki Glancy, Anairis Quiñones, Zeno Robinson, Matthew David Rudd, and Matt Shipman.
March 21-22, 2026	Rochester Institute of Technology; Rochester, New York		Chalk Twins, ChibiTifa, Chikkupea, Marisa Duran, Stephen Fu, Ironmouse, Brittany Lauda, StarsOfCassiopeia, Howard Wang, and Joshua Waters.
