= Savage Genius =

Japanese band

- Origin: Kobe, Japan
- Years active: 2001–present
- Labels: Warner Music Japan (2001–04); Victor Entertainment/flyingDOG (2004–)
- Members: Aa
- Past members: Takumi
- Website: www.jvcmusic.co.jp/sg/

Savage Genius (stylized as savage genius) is a Japanese band signed to Victor Entertainment. Since 2008, Aa (ああ) has stayed as the only member of the band.

== History ==
The duo Aa (vocals and lyricist) and Takumi (composer/arranger, producer) started as a songwriting group in the live music scene in Kobe. They debuted in the 2001 AXIA Artist Audition, and signed with Warner Music Japan, cutting two singles.

In 2004 they signed with Victor Entertainment, where they continue to release songs, many of which are anime theme songs.

On the 30th of November 2007, it was announced that one of the group's members, Takumi, had retired.

== Discography ==
Note: All song lyrics by Aa, all music composed by Takumi unless otherwise noted.

=== Singles ===
#	Information
1	"Orange" (オレンジ, Orenji): Released: February 27, 2002; Catalog Number: Oricon Peak Position: Weeks on Chart:
2	"Koigokoro" (恋心; "A Heart in Love"): Released: June 12, 2002; Catalog Number: Oricon Peak Position: Weeks on Chart:
3	"Omoi o Kanadete" (想いを奏でて; "Playing on My Feelings"): Released: October 21, 2004; Catalog Number: VICL-35714; Oricon Peak Position: #53; Weeks on Chart: 6; Opening and ending theme songs for the anime Uta∽Kata
4	"Forever...": Released: May 11, 2005; Catalog Number: VICL-35793; Oricon Peak Position: #16; Weeks on Chart: 8; Opening theme song for the anime Elemental Gelade
5	"Take a Chance": Released: July 6, 2005; Catalog Number: VICL-35834; Oricon Peak Position: #26; Weeks on Chart: 4; Opening and ending theme songs for the game Gundam True Odyssey: Legend of the Lost G
6	"Inori no Uta" (祈りの詩; "Song of Prayer"): Released: April 19, 2006; Catalog Number: VICL-35990; Oricon Peak Position: #52; Weeks on Chart: 3; Ending theme song for the anime Simoun
7	"Aizome" (あいぞめ; lit. 'Indigo Dye'): Released: December 21, 2006; Catalog Number: VICL-36176; Oricon Peak Position: #75; Weeks on Chart: 3; Ending theme song for the anime Jigoku Shōjo Futakomori
8	"Hikari no Yukue" (光の行方; lit. 'Light's Whereabouts'): Released: May 16, 2007; Catalog Number: VICL-36611; Oricon Peak Position: #39; Weeks on Chart: 3; Opening theme song for the anime El Cazador de la Bruja
9	"Just Tune": Released: October 16, 2008; Catalog Number: VTCL-35040; Oricon Peak Position: #52; Weeks on Chart: 8; Opening theme song for the anime Yozakura Quartet
10	"Maze" feat. Tomoe Ohmi: Released: June 3, 2009; Catalog Number: VTCL-35058; Oricon Peak Position: #35; Weeks on Chart: 5; Ending theme song for the anime Pandora Hearts
11	"Watashi wo mitsukete." (私をみつけて。; lit. 'Find me.'): Released: August 19, 2009; Catalog Number: VTCL-35068; Oricon Peak Position: #85; Weeks on Chart: 2; Ending theme song for the anime Pandora Hearts

=== Albums ===
- Kaze no Kesshō (風の結晶; "Crystals of Wind") (July 5, 2006) #41
- Sora no Kotoba (空ノ言葉; "Language of the Sky") (November 7, 2007) #71

No.	Title	Length
1.	"Hikari no Yukue ~Album Long Version"	5:26
2.	"Mou nido to"	4:55
3.	"Eien ni furu Konayuki"	5:08
4.	"Prometheus"	4:18
5.	"Koishikute Koishikute"	4:18
6.	"Anata no you desu"	4:46
7.	"Beautiful world ~Ningyo no Namida"	4:16
8.	"Merry Christmas for you"	4:11
9.	"Aizome ~Futakomori"	5:12
10.	"Yumeji he"	5:36
11.	"Niji wo Wataru Toki ga Kita"	4:13

- First Smile (October 20, 2010)
