= Junjō no Afilia =

Japanese female vocal group

- Origin: Tokyo, Japan
- Genre: J-pop
- Years active: 2008–present
- Label: 5pb. Records
- Members: Kaori Nagisa; Kana Hayama; Yumi Terasaka; Anna Oda; Chloe Yuki; Serrah Amamori; Amina Tojo; Beal Natsume; Meimi Mochizuki
- Past members: Kohime Lit Pucci; Yukafin Doll; Miku Doll Charlotte; Aria M. Milvana; Louise Sforzur; Ayami Chercy Snow; Laura Sucreine; Emiu Weilschmidt; Raymee Heavenly; Reina Scott Mauser; Nana Drop Bijou; Moe Meley; Momoko Little Berry; Mirumo D Pon; Aomi Maho
- Website: afiliasaga.jp

Junjō no Afilia (純情のアフィリア), formerly Afilia Saga East (アフィリア・サーガ・イースト, Afiria Sāga Īsuto) and Afilia Saga (アフィリア・サーガ, Afiria Sāga), is a Japanese female vocal group associated with a chain of maid cafés and restaurants called Afilia Group. Its members represent (work at) shops in the Tokyo districts of Ikebukuro, Ueno, Roppongi and Shinjuku. The group jointly formed by Chiyomaru Shikura and voice actress and singer Haruko Momoi. People who have written songs for the group include Tsunku and Kōsuke Ōjima.

== Overview and history ==
The group was formed in 2008 and is conceived as an "academy-type vocal unit" consisting of girls selected from establishments belonging to Afilia Group, a nationwide cafe and restaurant network. It is jointly produced by two people, Chiyomaru Shikura and voice actress and singer Haruko Momoi. The group employs a line-up changing system with members joining and leaving.

On March 28, 2012, Afilia Saga East released its 7th single, titled "Mirai no Watashi o Matteiru" ("There's a Future Waiting for Me"). The title song was written by Tsunku and composed by Chiyomaru Shikura. At the time, the group was composed of 14 members, the maximum number since its creation. The single became the group's first to enter the top 10 of the Oricon weekly charts.

By March 24, 2013, the group was composed of 11 members. Afilia Saga sung the ending theme for the TV animation series Hyperdimension Neptunia: The Animation, as well as the opening theme for another series, My Mental Choices are Completely Interfering with my School Romantic Comedy.

On June 3, 2017, the group changed their name to "Junjō no Afilia".

On June 12, 2019, their kanji surnames were added and their names changed.

== Members ==
=== Current members ===
- Nagisa Kaori (渚カオリ)Kaori S Godrand (カオリ・セレーネ・ゴドランド)
- Hayama Kana (葉山カナ)Kana R Norwich (カナ・R(リア)・ノーウィッチ)
- Terasaka Yumi (寺坂ユミ)Yumi W Klein (ユミ・W(ヴァサーファル)・クライン)
- Oda Anna (桜田アンナ)Anna (アンナ)
- Yuki Chloe (優希クロエ)Chloe M Charmant (クロエ・M・シャルマン)
- Amemori Serrah (雨森セラ)Sera N Repsy (セラ・N・レプシー)
- Tojo Amina (東城アミナ)Amina Filomina (アミナ・フィロメーナ)
- Natsume Beal (夏目ベール)Beel Kronos Note (ベール・クロノス・ノート)
- Mochizuki Meimi (望月ミイミ)Meimi Lillmoon (ミイミ・リルムーン)

=== Former members ===
- Alice Rozen (アリス・ローゼン)
- Love Berry Janne (ラブ・ベリー・ジャンヌ)
- Myuna Shulita (ミュナ・シュリータ)
- Raymee Heavenly (レイミー・ヘヴンリー)
- Laura Sucreine (ローラ・シュクレーヌ)
- Ayami Chercy Snow (アヤミ・チェルシー・スノウ)
- Louise Sforzur (ルイズ・スフォルツア)
- Akane Kohinata (小日向 茜)Kohime Lit Pucci (コヒメ・リト・プッチ)
- Yukafin Doll (ユカフィン・ドール)
- Miku Doll Charlotte (ミク・ドール・シャルロット)
- Ramune Lithe Antique (ラムネ・リザ・アンティーク) (until May 2009)
- Lily Coco Evance (リリィ・ココ・エヴァンス) (until August 2009)
- Mayurin Shidii Messhu (マユリン・シディー・メッシュ) (May 2009 — September 2009)
- Yuki Callenreese (ユウキ・カーレンリース) (until December 2009)
- Mew Chat Noir (ミュー・シャ・ノワール) (until March 2010)
- Meena M. Frace (ミィナ・M・フラーチェ) (until March 2012)
- Rose Gardenfairy (ロゼ・ガーデンフェアリー) (until March 2012)
- Karen Classica (カレン・クラシュカ) (October 2010 — September 2012)
- Kurumi Lala Milk (クルミ・ラーラ・ミルク) (August 2009 — February 2013)
- Meiry Malonfeel (メイリ・マロンフィール) (May 2009 — March 2013)
- Aria M. Milvana (アリア・M・ミルヴァーナ)
- Emiu Weilschmidt (エミュウ・ヴァイルシュミット)
- Reina Scott Mauser (レイナ・スコット・モーゼル)
- Nana Dorp Bijoux (ナナ・ドロップ・ビジュー)
- Moe Mieray (モエ・ミーレイ)
- Momoko Little Berry (モモコ・リトルベリー)
- Mirumo D Pon (ミルモ・D・ポン)
- Aomi Maho (青海マホ)Maho Sotto Voce (マホ・ソット・ボーチェ)

=== Timeline ===
Pink - renamed to Afilia Saga

Purple - renamed to Junjou no Afilia

== Discography ==
=== Singles ===
No.	Title	Release date	Weekly Singles Chart
as Afilia Saga East
1	"Luminous no Izumi" (ルミナスの泉, Ruminasu no Izumi)	March 31, 2009	115
2	"Meridian no Inori" (メリディンの祈り)	May 27, 2009	108
3	"Hōgako Romance" (放課後 ロマンス)	February 3, 2010	80
4	"Watashi Love na Otome!" (ワタシ☆LOVEな☆オトメ!)	April 28, 2010	132
5	"Knee High Egoist" (ニーハイ・エゴイスト)	December 1, 2010	39
6	"La*La*La Revolution" (La*La*Laラボリューション)	July 27, 2011	36
7	"Mirai no Watashi o Matteiru" (未来が私を待っている)	March 28, 2012	6
8	"Kindan Muteki no Darling" (禁断無敵のだーりん)	June 13, 2012	15
9	"Survive!!" (SURVIVE!!)	November 13, 2012	9
as Afilia Saga
10	"Neptune☆Sagashite" (ネプテューヌ☆サガして)	August 7, 2013	11
11	"S.M.L" (S.M.L☆) (Anime "Noucome" opening theme)	November 13, 2013	4
12	"MAGICAL☆EXPRESS☆JOURNEY" (マジカル☆エクスプレス☆ジャーニー)	July 23, 2014	3
13	"Japonesque×Romanesque" (ジャポネスク×ロマネスク)	November 26, 2014	9
14	"Never Say Never"	January 11, 2015	4
15	"Embrace Blade"	November 18, 2015	7
16	"Someday, I Saw Under the Rainbow" (いつか見た虹のその下で, Itsuka Mita Niji no Sono Shita de)	March 2, 2016	5
17	"Lost in the Sky"	July 26, 2016	8
18	"The Legend of Magical Chocolate" (魔法のチョコレート伝説, Mahou no Chocolate Densetsu)	January 25, 2017	8
19	"Irrational and Uncorrectable Beliefs" (非合理的かつ訂正不能な思い込み, Higori Teki Katsu Teisei Funo na Omoikomi)	April 19, 2017	6
as Junjou no Afilia
20	"There's No Magic in The World" (この世界に魔法なんてないよ, Kono Sekai ni Mahou Nantenai yo) "First Time SEASON" (はじめてのSEASON, Hajimete no Season) (Anime "Hajimete no Gal" opening theme)	August 30, 2017	11
21	"That's What Life Means" (それだけが、生きる意味なんだ, Sore Dake ga, Ikiru Imi Nanda)	March 28, 2018	7
22	"I Want to Grow" "Kisyotenketujohakyu" (起・承・転・結・序・破・急)	November 27, 2018	5
23	"Cruel Babel" (残酷のバベル, Zankoku no Baberu)	September 3, 2019	11
24	"Like? or Love?" "Ultimate unbalance" (究極アンバランス！, Kyukyoku Anbaransu!)	March 11, 2020	8

=== Albums ===
No.	Title	Release date	Weekly Singles Chart
1	Whitism (whitism)	June 1, 2011	46
2	Archism	April 24, 2013	20
3	Realism	August 25, 2015	24
4	Junjo guide stone (ジュンジョウ・ガイドストーン)	September 3, 2019	33

=== Live DVDs ===
No.	Title	Release date	Weekly Singles Chart
1	Afilia Saga East Live & PV-shū (アフィリア・サーガ・イースト ライブ&PV集)	November 25, 2011	—
2	Seinaru 2nd One-man Live 2011 Zepp Tokyo' (聖ナル2ndワンマンLive2011 ZeppTokyo)	July 25, 2012	197
3	4th One-man Live KI☆RA☆RI☆N☆Maho' (4thワンマンLive キ☆ラ☆リ☆ン☆魔法)	June 26, 2013	Out of the ranking area
4	Afilia Saga 5th One-man Live 2011 The Hundred Year's War of Love Nippon seinenkan' (アフィリア・サーガ 5thワンマンライブ〜恋の百年戦争〜日本青年館)	February 19, 2014	77(BD)
5	Afilia Saga 11th Single Premium Live To The Grand Death Valler' (アフィリア・サーガ 11thシングルプレミアムワンマンライブ〜グランドデスヴァレーへの冒険〜)	December 24, 2014	Out of the ranking area
6	Afilia Saga 5th Anniversary Live Tour in Tokyo Venus and the seven blue seas' (ヴィーナスと青き七つの海 アフィリア・サーガ5周年記念ライブツアーin東京公演)	July 25, 2012	197
7	Christmas live Christmas live in Maihama-amphitheater' (c クリスマスライブin舞浜アンフィシアター)	May 20, 2015	24(BD)
8	Graduation Live DVD Ayami Chercy Snow Graduation Live Akasaka BLITZ' (卒業ライブDVD ～アヤミ・チェルシー・スノウ卒業Live～ 赤坂BLITZ)	May 18, 2016	Out of the ranking area
9	Graduation Live DVD Louise Sforzur Graduation Live DiverCity(TOKYO)' (卒業ライブDVD ～ルイズ・スフォルツア卒業Live～Zepp DiverCity(TOKYO))	June 1, 2016	Out of the ranking area
10	Afilia Saga One-man Live Tour 2016 Tenku no Arclight - Lost In The Sky' (アフィリア・サーガ ワンマンライブツアー2016 天空のアークライト 〜Lost In The Sky〜)	February 3, 2017
11	Seinaru 2nd One-man Live 2011 Eien no ai no megami TOUR FINAL IN Shinjuku BLAZE' (アフィリア・サーガ ワンマンライブツアー2017 永遠の蒼き愛の女神 FINAL in 新宿 BLAZE)	January 24, 2018
12	Afilia Saga One-man Live the Legend of Graduation Kohime Yukafin Miku Graduation Live in Differ Ariake ' (アフィリア・サーガ ワンマンライブ「the Legend of Graduation」〜コヒメ、ユカフィン、ミク卒業ライブ〜inディファ有明)	January 24, 2018
13	Junjo no Afilia 10th Anniversary One Man Tour' (純情のアフィリア 10周年ワンマンツアー)	December 4, 2019
14	Junjo no Afilia One Man Live Maho graduation Live Voyage to the Blue Ocean' (純情のアフィリア ワンマンライブ～マホ卒業公演 〜Voyage to the Blue Ocean〜)	January 8, 2020

=== Other DVDs ===
No.	Title	Release date
1	Mikupai!' (みくぱい!)	September 3, 2014
2	Fujori na kono Sekai de' (不条理なこの世界で…)	March 15, 2015
3	Maho Sotto Voce Mahoshojo' (マホ・ソット・ボーチェ 魔法少女。)	December 25, 2015
4	Maho Sotto Voce MahoshojoNI' (マホ・ソット・ボーチェ 魔法少女に。)	April 28, 2017
5	Jikukeisatsu Sigreider' (時空警察SIG-RAIDER)	May 8, 2018
