= Marina Inoue =

Japanese voice actress and singer (born 1985)

- 井上 麻里奈
- Born: January 20, 1985 (age 41); Musashino, Tokyo, Japan
- Education: Gakushuin University
- Occupations: Voice actress; Singer
- Years active: 2004–present
- Agent: Aoni Production
- Notable work: Attack on Titan as Armin Arlert; Gurren Lagann as Yoko Littner; Date A Live as Tohka Yatogami; My Hero Academia as Momo Yaoyorozu; Sayonara, Zetsubou-sensei as Kitsu Chiri; Smile PreCure! as Nao Midorikawa/Cure March; Skip Beat! as Kyōko Mogami; Haganai as Yozora Mikazuki; Freezing as Chiffon Fairchild; Rin-ne as Sakura Mamiya; Hayate the Combat Butler as Wataru Tachibana; Persona 3 Portable as Kotone Shiomi; Owarimonogatari as Sodachi Oikura; Jujutsu Kaisen as Mai Zen'in; Honkai Impact 3rd as Elysia; Honkai: Star Rail as Yanqing, Cyrene; Girls' Frontline as OTs-14; Girls' Frontline 2: Exilium as Groza, OTs-14; The Seven Deadly Sins as Jericho

Marina Inoue (井上 麻里奈, Inoue Marina; born January 20, 1985) is a Japanese voice actress and singer from Tokyo, Japan. She is affiliated with Aoni Production. She was signed into Aniplex until 2007. She was chosen out of 2,000 people from the "Gonna be a star" auditions (hosted by Sony Music Entertainment Japan) for the title role in the OVA Le Portrait de Petit Cossette.

== Filmography ==
=== Television animation ===
Year	Title	Role
2004	Gakuen Alice	Misaki Harada
2004	Tactics	Rosalie
2004	Tsukuyomi: Moon Phase	Kōhei Morioka (child)
2004	Yakitate!! Japan	Kanmuri Shigeru
2005	Ginban Kaleidoscope	Mika Honjō
2005	Hell Girl	Kaoruko Kurushima
2006	009-1	Mia Connery (009-7)
2006	D.Gray-man	Elda
2006	Kiba	Rebecca
2006	Nerima Daikon Brothers	Karakuri Yukika and others
2006	Zegapain	Minato
2007	Baccano!	Eve Genoard
2007	El Cazador de la Bruja	Lirio
2007	Gakuen Utopia Manabi Straight!	Mutsuki Uehara
2007	Getsumen To Heiki Mina	Mina Tsukuda, Mina Tsukishiro
2007	Hayate the Combat Butler	Wataru Tachibana, Shion Kuresato
2007	Magical Girl Lyrical Nanoha Strikers	Erio Mondial, Wendy, Cinque
2007	Minami-ke	Kana Minami
2007	Moetan	Shizuku
2007	Mushi-Uta	Kasuou
2007	Ōkiku Furikabutte	Ruri Mihashi
2007	Sayonara Zetsubō Sensei	Chiri Kitsu
2007	Shakugan no Shana Second	Pheles
2007	Suteki Tantei Labyrinth	Rakuta Koga
2007	Gurren Lagann	Yoko Littner
2007	Toward the Terra	Seki Leigh Shiroei
2008	Akaneiro ni Somaru Saka	Tsukasa Kiryu
2008	Amatsuki	Tsuruume
2008	Hidamari Sketch x 365	Tōdō
2008	Kyōran Kazoku Nikki	Madara
2008	Minami-ke: Okawari	Kana Minami
2008	Sekirei	Tsukiumi
2008	Skip-Beat!	Kyōko Mogami
2008	Someday's Dreamers: Summer Skies	Honomi Asagi
2008	Toshokan Sensō	Iku Kasahara
2008	Zoku Sayonara Zetsubō Sensei	Chiri Kitsu
2009	Gokujō!! Mecha Mote Iinchō	Emiko Miura
2009	Hayate the Combat Butler 2nd Season	Wataru Tachibana
2009	Kämpfer	Natsuru Senō
2009	Maria Holic	Matsurika Shinōji
2009	Minami-ke: Okaeri	Kana Minami
2009	Umineko no Naku Koro ni	Jessica Ushiromiya
2009	Valkyria Chronicles	Alicia Melchiott
2009	Zan Sayonara Zetsubō Sensei	Chiri Kitsu
2010	Black Butler II	Luka Macken
2010	Cobra the Animation	Ellis Lloyd
2010	Hidamari Sketch x Hoshimittsu	Tōdō
2010	Highschool of the Dead	Rei Miyamoto
2010	Major	Sophia Reed
2010	Marvel Anime: Iron Man	Aki
2010	Sekirei: Pure Engagement	Tsukiumi
2010	Uragiri wa Boku no Namae o Shitteiru	Touko Murasame
2010	Yumeiro Patissiere	Francoise
2011	Haganai	Yozora Mikazuki
2011	Digimon Xros Wars: The Young Hunters Who Leapt Through Time	Tagiru Akashi
2011	Freezing	Chiffon Fairchild
2011	Marvel Anime: X-Men	Riko Nirasaki
2011	Kyoukai Senjou no Horizon	Nate Mitotsudaira
2011	Infinite Stratos	Laura Bodewig
2011	Kämpfer für die Liebe	Natsuru Senō
2011	Maria Holic Alive	Matsurika Shinōji
2011	Metal Fight Beyblade 4D	Hikaru Hazama
2011	Oniichan no Koto Nanka Zenzen Suki Janain Dakara ne!!	Iroha Tsuchiura
2011	Rio: Rainbow Gate!	Rio Rollins Tachibana
2011	Sket Dance	Momoka Kibitsu
2011	Softenni	Sumino Kiba
2012	Chousoku Henkei Gyrozetter	Kakeru Todoroki
2012	Danball Senki W	Ami Kawamura
2012	Hagure Yuusha no Estetica	Haruka Nagase
2012	Kyoukai Senjou no Horizon II	Nate Mitotsudaira
2012	Shakugan no Shana Final	Pheles / Saihyō Firesu
2012	Smile PreCure!	Nao Midorikawa/Cure March
2013	Attack on Titan	Armin Arlert, Narrator
2013	Haganai NEXT	Yozora Mikazuki
2013	Date A Live	Tohka Yatogami
2013	Inu to Hasami wa Tsukaiyou	Kirihime Natsuno
2013	Galilei Donna	Anna Hendrix
2013	Infinite Stratos Season 2	Laura Bodewig
2013	Kill la Kill	Maiko Ōgure
2013	Log Horizon	Kanami
2013	Minami-ke: Tadaima	Kana Minami
2013	Yahari Ore no Seishun Love Come wa Machigatteiru	Yumiko Miura
2014	Buddy Complex	Anessa Rossetti
2014	Buddy Complex Kanketsu-hen: Ano Sora ni Kaeru Mirai de	Anessa Rossetti
2014	Date A Live II	Tohka Yatogami
2014	Hunter × Hunter (2011)	Amane
2014	M3 the dark metal	Suzaki, young Akashi
2014	The Seven Deadly Sins	Jericho
2014	No-Rin	Kochou Yoshida
2014	Oneechan ga Kita	Marina Mochizuki
2014	Psycho-Pass 2	Mizue Shisui
2014	The Irregular at Magic High School	Mari Watanabe
2014	Wizard Barristers: Benmashi Cecil	Quinn Erari
2014	Pocket Monsters XY	(Elle (Aria in English))
2015	Attack on Titan: Junior High	Armin Arlert, Narrator
2015	Chaos Dragon	Ibuki
2015	Log Horizon 2	Kanami
2015	Owarimonogatari	Sodachi Oikura
2015	Punchline	Yūta Iritatsu
2015	Magical Girl Lyrical Nanoha Vivid	Erio Mondial, Cinque Nakajima, Wendy Nakajima
2015	Rin-ne	Sakura Mamiya
2015	Unlimited Fafnir	Kili Surt Muspelheim
2015	My Teen Romantic Comedy SNAFU TOO!	Yumiko Miura
2015	Gintama	Ikeda Asaemon
2016	My Hero Academia	Momo Yaoyorozu
2016	Crayon Shin Chan	Samurai Girl (Ep. 902)
2016	Beyblade Burst	Valt Aoi
2016	Rin-ne Season 2	Sakura Mamiya
2016	March Comes in like a Lion	Kyouko Kouda
2017	Attack on Titan Season 2	Armin Arlert, narrator
2017	My Hero Academia Season 2	Momo Yaoyorozu
2017	Rin-ne Season 3	Sakura Mamiya
2017	March Comes in like a Lion 2nd Season	Kyouko Kouda
2017	Beyblade Burst Evolution	Valt Aoi
2017	Owarimonogatari Season 2	Sodachi Oikura
2018	Laid-Back Camp	Sakura Kagamihara
2018	Darling in the Franxx	Nana
2018	My Hero Academia Season 3	Momo Yaoyorozu
2018	Attack on Titan Season 3	Armin Arlert, Narrator
2018	Beyblade Burst Turbo	Valt Aoi
2018	The Girl in Twilight	Chloé Morisu
2018	Karakuri Circus	Vilma Thorne
2019	Date A Live III	Tohka Yatogami
2019	Cop Craft	Cameron Estefan
2019	YU-NO: A Girl Who Chants Love at the Bound of this World	Amanda
2019	Beyblade Burst Rise	Valt Aoi
2019	Isekai Cheat Magician	Smyera
2019	My Hero Academia Season 4	Momo Yaoyorozu
2019	Attack on Titan Season 3 Part 2	Armin Arlert, Narrator
2020	Pocket Monsters 2019	Sonia
2020	Jujutsu Kaisen	Mai Zenin
2020	Warlords of Sigrdrifa	Yayoi Amatsuka
2020	Yo-kai Watch Jam - Yo-kai Academy Y: Close Encounters of the N Kind	Mataro Tamada
2020	Beyblade Burst Surge	Valt Aoi
2020	Attack on Titan: The Final Season	Armin Arlert, Narrator
2020	The Irregular at Magic High School: Visitor Arc	Mari Watanabe
2021	Log Horizon: Destruction of the Round Table	Kanami
2021	Beyblade Burst Quaddrive	Valt Aoi
2021	My Hero Academia Season 5	Momo Yaoyorozu
2021	Shinkansen Henkei Robo Shinkalion Z	Akeno Myōjō
2021	The Honor Student at Magic High School	Mari Watanabe
2021	The Fruit of Evolution	Artoria Gremm
2022	Attack on Titan: The Final Season Part 2	Armin Arlert, Narrator
2022	Miss Shachiku and the Little Baby Ghost	Kaori
2022	Date A Live IV	Tohka Yatogami
2022	Smile of the Arsnotoria the Animation	Hammit
2022	My Hero Academia Season 6	Momo Yaoyorozu
2022	Urusei Yatsura	Ryōko Mendō
2022	RWBY: Ice Queendom	Whitley Schnee
2022	Chainsaw Man	Young Denji
2023	Tōsōchū: The Great Mission	Luna Nishidōi
2023	Demon Slayer: Kimetsu no Yaiba	Nakime
2023	The Fruit of Evolution 2	Artoria Gremm
2023	Beyblade Burst Quadstrike	Valt Aoi
2023	Chronicles of an Aristocrat Reborn in Another World	Aaron
2023	My Daughter Left the Nest and Returned an S-Rank Adventurer	Helvetica Bordeaux
2023	The Demon Sword Master of Excalibur Academy	Leonis
2023	Jujutsu Kaisen Season 2	Mai Zenin
2023	Firefighter Daigo: Rescuer in Orange	Sakura Nagata
2024	The Weakest Tamer Began a Journey to Pick Up Trash	Mira
2024	Date A Live V	Tohka Yatogami
2024	My Hero Academia Season 7	Momo Yaoyorozu
2024	One Piece	Rear-Admiral Kujaku
2024	Tonbo! Season 2	Ema Kurisu
2024	Bleach: Thousand-Year Blood War	Jugram Haschwalth (young)
2025	#Compass 2.0: Combat Providence Analysis System	Matoi Fukagawa
2025	Onmyo Kaiten Re:Birth Verse	Kazura
2025	Scooped Up by an S-Rank Adventurer!	Merlin
2025	My Hero Academia: Final Season	Momo Yaoyorozu
2026	Jujutsu Kaisen Season 3	Mai Zenin
2026	Digimon Beatbreak	Granit
2026	Petals of Reincarnation	Jubei Mitsuyoshi Yagyu
2027	Multi-Mind Mayhem	Maggot

=== Animated films ===
- Doraemon: Nobita's Space Heroes (2015) (Aron)
- The Irregular at Magic High School: The Movie – The Girl Who Summons the Stars (2017) (Mari Watanabe)
- Pretty Cure All Stars New Stage: Friends of the Future (2012) (Nao Midorikawa/Cure March)
- Smile PreCure! The Movie: Big Mismatch in a Picture Book! (2012) (Nao Midorikawa/Cure March)
- Pretty Cure All Stars New Stage 2: Friends of the Heart (2013) (Nao Midorikawa/Cure March)
- Pretty Cure All Stars New Stage 3: Eternal Friends (2014) (Nao Midorikawa/Cure March)
- Hugtto! PreCure Futari wa Pretty Cure: All Stars Memories (2018) (Nao Midorikawa/Cure March)
- Aura: Maryūinkōga Saigo no Tatakai (Yumina Ōshima)
- Broken Blade (Narvi)
- Date A Live: Mayuri Judgement (Tohka Yatogami)
- Goku Sayonara Zetsubou Sensei (Chiri Kitsu)
- Hayate the Combat Butler (Wataru Tachibana)
- Hidamari Sketch x 365 Specials (Tōdō)
- Jujutsu Kaisen 0 (Mai Zen'in)
- Kite Liberator (Monaka Noguchi / Sawa)
- Le Portrait de Petit Cossette (Cossette d'Auvergne)
- Mahō Sensei Negima: Anime Final (2011) (Kotaro Inugami)
- Zokuowarimonogatari (2018) (Sodachi Oikura)
- My Hero Academia: Two Heroes (2018) (Momo Yaoyorozu)
- My Hero Academia: Heroes Rising (2019) (Momo Yaoyorozu)
- The Island of Giant Insects (2019-2020) (Enoki Inaho)
- Yo-kai Watch Jam the Movie: Yo-Kai Academy Y - Can a Cat be a Hero? (Mataro Tamada)
- My Hero Academia: World Heroes' Mission (2021) (Momo Yaoyorozu)
- Bubble (2022) (Undertaker)
- Laid-Back Camp Movie (2022) (Sakura Kagamihara)
- Doraemon: Nobita's Sky Utopia (2023) (Marimba)
- Sailor Moon Cosmos (2023) (Kō Seiya/Sailor Star Fighter)

=== Original video animation ===
- Tokyo Marble Chocolate (2007) (Miki)
- Mahō Sensei Negima! ~Shiroki Tsubasa Ala Alba~ (2008) (Kotaro Inugami)
- Mahō Sensei Negima: Mō Hitotsu no Sekai (2009) (Kotaro Inugami)

=== Original net animation ===
- Romantic Killer (2022) (Arisa Kazuki)
- Pluto (2023) (Dr. Roosevelt)
- Monogatari Off & Monster Season (2024) (Sodachi Oikura)
- Bullet/Bullet (2025) (Gear)
- Yu-Gi-Oh! Card Game The Chronicles (2025) (Ferrijit)

=== Video games ===
- A Certain Magical Index: Imaginary Fest (Sozty Exica)
- Ace Attorney 6 (Akane Hōzuki)
- Action Taimanin (Su Jinglei)
- Attack on Titan (Armin Arlert, narrator)
- Angel Profile (Teresa)
- Another Eden (Biaka)
- Arcana Heart series (Petra Johanna Lagerkvist)
- Arknights (Pallas)
- Atelier Ayesha: The Alchemist of Dusk (Ayesha Altugle)
- Atelier Shallie: Alchemists of the Dusk Sea (Ayesha Altugle)
- Atlantica Online - Mercenary (Necromencer Riva Fuast) Japanese voice
- Azur Lane - MNF Jean Bart, FFNF Richelieu
- Blue Dragon (2006) (Shu)
- Cardfight!! Vanguard Dear Days (Rasen Ichidoji)
- Chaos Rings (Musiea)
- Cookie Run: Kingdom (2021) (White Lily Cookie)
- Counter:Side (Machine Collector)
- Date A Live: Arusu Install (Tohka Yatogami)
- Date A Live: Ren Dystopia (Tohka Yatogami)
- Date A Live: Rinne Utopia (Tohka Yatogami)
- Date A Live: Rio Reincarnation (Tohka Yatogami)
- Dead or Alive Paradise (Rio Rollins Tachibana)
- Dissidia Final Fantasy Opera Omnia (Sherlotta)
- Dragalia Lost (Lea)
- Dragon Quest: Heroes (Bianca Whitaker)
- Echocalypse, Yora
- Elsword (Elesis)
- Epic Seven (Luna)
- Fate/Grand Order (Fairy Knight Gawain - Barghest)
- Final Fantasy Type-0 (Caetuna)
- Final Fantasy Type-0 HD (Caetuna)
- Gakuen Utopia Manabi Straight! Kirakira Happy Festa (Mutsuki Uehara)
- Genso Suikoden: Tsumugareshi Hyakunen no Toki (Murat)
- Getsumen To Heiki Mina -Futatsu no Project M- (Tsukuda Mina, Tsukishiro Mina)
- Granado Espada (Japanese version) (Calypso/Calyce)
- Girls' Frontline (OTs-14), (6P62)
- Girls' Frontline 2: Exilium (Groza)
- Goddess of Victory: Nikke (Helm)
- Hayate no Gotoku! Boku ga Romio de Romio ga Boku de (Wataru Tachibana)
- Honkai Impact 3rd (Elysia)
- Honkai: Star Rail (Yanqing, Cyrene)
- Infinite Stratos: Archetype Breaker (2017), (Laura Bodewig)
- Lufia: Curse of the Sinistrals (Selan)
- Magia Record (2020), (Jun Kazari)
- My Hero: One's Justice (2018), Momo Yaoyorozu
- No More Heroes: Heroes' Paradise (Sylvia Christel)
- Omega Quintet (Momoka)
- Onmyoji (Yuki Douji, Oguna, Gaki)
- Persona 3 Portable (Female Protagonist)
- Persona Q2: New Cinema Labyrinth (P3P Heroine)
- Punishing: Gray Raven (Vera)
- River City Girls 2 (Marian)
- Senran Kagura: Peach Beach Splash (Soji)
- Shadowverse (Octrice, Badb Catha)
- Sorairo no Fūkin -Remix- (Floria)
- The First Berserker: Khazan (2025) (Bellerian)
- The Hundred Line: Last Defense Academy (2025) (Hiruko Shizuhara)
- The Seven Deadly Sins: Grand Cross (2019) (Jericho)
- Steal Princess (Anis)
- Street Fighter X Tekken (Christie Monteiro)
- Super Heroine Chronicle (2014) (Laura Bodewig)
- 2nd Super Robot Wars Z (Yoko)
- So Ra No Wo To: Otome no Quintet (Kyrie Kuon)
- Saint Seiya Awakening (2019) (Eagle Marin)
- Tales of Graces (Kohak Hearts, Kamenin, Dark Kamenin)
- Tales of Hearts (Kohak Hearts)
- Tales of VS. (Kohak Hearts)
- Tales of the Heroes: Twin Brave (Kohak Hearts)
- Umineko When They Cry (Jessica Ushiromiya)
- Valkyrie Anatomia: The Origin (Aurora)
- Valkyria Chronicles series (Alicia Melchiott)
- Valkyrie Connect (Compassion God Baldr)
- Warriors All-Stars (Rio Rollins Tachibana)
- Wuthering Waves (Lynae)
- YU-NO: A Girl Who Chants Love at the Bound of this World (2017) (Amanda)
- Zenless Zone Zero (Zhu Yuan)

=== Tokusatsu ===
Title	Role	Episodes
Tensou Sentai Goseiger	Matroid Metal Alice of the Agent	33-44
Kaizoku Sentai Gokaiger	Metal Alice of the Agent	40

=== Multimedia projects ===
Title	Role	Source
Paradox Live	Yeon Dongha	

=== Dubbing ===
==== Live-action ====
List of voice performances in other dubbing
Title	Role	Voice dub for	Notes	Source
Don't Worry Darling	Alice Chambers	Florence Pugh		
Elvis	Priscilla Presley	Olivia DeJonge		
Gimme Shelter	Agnes "Apple" Bailey	Vanessa Hudgens		
Good Sam	Dr. Sam Griffith	Sophia Bush		
The Legend of Tarzan	Jane Porter Clayton	Margot Robbie		
Mars	Amelie Durand	Clémentine Poidatz		
Midsommar	Dani Ardor	Florence Pugh		
Monster Hunter	Dash	Meagan Good		
Mortal Engines	Sathya Kuranath	Menik Gooneratne		
Sonic the Hedgehog	Maddie Wachowski	Tika Sumpter		
Sonic the Hedgehog 2	Maddie Wachowski	Tika Sumpter		
Knuckles	Maddie Wachowski	Tika Sumpter		
Sonic the Hedgehog 3	Maddie Wachowski	Tika Sumpter		
She-Hulk: Attorney at Law	Jennifer Walters / She-Hulk	Tatiana Maslany		

==== Animation ====
List of voice performances in other dubbing
Title	Role	Notes	Source
DC Super Hero Girls	Wonder Woman		
Sing 2	Suki Lane		

== Discography ==
=== Singles ===
#	Single information
1	"Hōseki" (宝石): Released: August 11, 2004; Theme song from: Le Portrait de Petit Cossette; B-side: Ballad (Insert song from Le Portrait de Petit Cossette)
2	Energy: Released: December 21, 2005; Theme song from: Ginban Kaleidoscope; B-side: Way (Insert song from Ginban Kaleidoscope)
3	"Beautiful Story" (ビューティフル・ストーリー)): Released: February 21, 2007; Theme song from: Getsumen To Heiki Mina; B-side: "Hen na Koi" (変な恋)

=== Other songs ===
- "Keikenchi Jōshōchū" (経験値上昇中☆) (Minami-ke theme song, with Rina Satou and Minori Chihara)
- "Colorful Days" (カラフルDAYS) (Minami-ke ending theme, with Rina Satou and Minori Chihara)
- "Keikenchi Soku Joujou↑↑" (経験値速上々↑↑) (Minami-ke: Okaeri theme song, with Rina Satou and Minori Chihara)
- "Zettai Colorful Sengen"" (絶対カラフル宣言) (Minami-ke: Okaeri ending theme, with Rina Satou and Minori Chihara)
- "Love Diving" (ラブダイビング) (Akane-iro ni Somaru Saka ending theme)
- "Four season's memory" (Akane-iro ni Somaru Saka ending theme)
- "trust" (Tales Of Hearts )
- "Kimi ni, Mune Kyun" (君に、胸キュン) (Maria Holic ending theme, with Yu Kobayashi and Asami Sanada)
- "Get a Chance!" (Mahou Sensei Negima! ~Mou Hitotsu no Sekai~ ending theme, with Rina Satou)
- "Dokkyûn☆Heart" (Umineko no Naku Koro ni, Jessica Ushiromiya theme song, insert song (ep. II-I)
- "One Way Ryou Omoi" (ワンウェイ両想い) (Kämpfer ending theme, with Megumi Nakajima)
- "Sekirei" (Sekirei opening theme, with Saori Hayami, Hanazawa Kana & Aya Endō)
- "Dear Sweet Heart" (Sekirei ending theme, with Saori Hayami, Hanazawa Kana & Aya Endō)
- "Hakuyoku no Sekiyaku ~Pure Engagement~" (Sekirei ~Pure Engagement~ opening theme, with Saori Hayami, Hanazawa Kana & Aya Endō)
- "Onnaji Kimochi" (Sekirei ~Pure Engagement~ ending theme, with Saori Hayami, Hanazawa Kana & Aya Endō)
- "The Regrettable Neighbours Club" (Boku wa Tomodachi ga Sukunai opening theme, with Kanae Itō, Nozomi Yamamoto, Misato Fukuen, Kana Hanazawa, and Yuka Iguchi)
- "My Feelings" (Boku wa Tomodachi ga Sukunai ending theme.)
- "Be My Friend" (Boku wa Tomodachi ga Sukunai NEXT opening theme, with Kanae Itō, Nozomi Yamamoto, Misato Fukuen, Kana Hanazawa, and Yuka Iguchi)
- "Bokura no Tsubasa" (Boku wa Tomodachi ga Sukunai NEXT ending theme.)
- "Yakusoku no Umi" (Uragiri wa Boku no Namae wo Shitteiru with Jun Fukuyama)
- "Shiawase High Tension" (シアワセ☆ハイテンション↑↑) (Minami-ke: Tadaima theme song, with Rina Satou and Minori Chihara)
- "Wan Wan Wan Wan N_1!!" (わんわんわんわんN_1！！) (Inu to Hasami wa Tsukaiyou theme song, with Kazuhito Harumi, Kirihime Natsuno, Asumi Kana, Itou Shizuka, Ai Kakuma and Yu Serizawa) and * Far Away (Attack on Titan Character Image Song) Released May,2017
- "Mathemagics" (Owarimonogatari opening theme)
- "Yuudachi Houteishiki (夕立方程式") (Owarimonogatari opening theme)
- "Do as I say" (Paradox Live, as character Dongha Yeon)
- "True Pride" (Paradox Live, as character Dongha Yeon)
- "Nobody But Me" (Paradox Live, as character Dongha Yeon)
- "Gotta Believe" (Paradox Live, as character Dongha Yeon)
