= List of Miss Kobayashi's Dragon Maid episodes =

Key visual for the series

The anime series Miss Kobayashi's Dragon Maid is based on a Japanese manga series of the same name written and illustrated by Coolkyousinnjya that is published on Futabasha's Monthly Action magazine. The series was directed by Yasuhiro Takemoto at Kyoto Animation and aired in Japan between 12 January and 6 April 2017. Yuka Yamada handled series composition, Miku Kadowaki designed the characters, Nobuaki Maruki served as chief animation director, and the music was composed by Masumi Itō. Crunchyroll simulcast the series as it aired while Funimation released an English dubbed version from 1 February 2017. An original video animation episode was released on the seventh Blu-ray/DVD compilation volume on 20 September 2017. The opening theme is "Aozora no Rhapsody" (青空のラプソディ; "Rhapsody of Blue Sky") by Fhána, and the ending theme is "Ishukan Communication" (イシュカン・コミュニケーション; "Interspecies Communication") by Chorogons (Tohru (Yūki Kuwahara), Kanna Kamui (Maria Naganawa), Lucoa (Minami Takahashi), and Elma (Yūki Takada)). Madman Entertainment will import Funimation's release into Australia and New Zealand.

A second season titled Miss Kobayashi's Dragon Maid S (小林さんちのメイドラゴンS, Kobayashi-san Chi no Meidoragon S), the season aired between 8 July and 23 September 2021. was announced with the release of the eighth manga volume on 12 February 2019. Its status was unknown for a time following the death of Takemoto in the Kyoto Animation arson attack. Kyoto Animation returned to produce the season. Tatsuya Ishihara is replacing Takemoto as director, although Takemoto is credited as "series director" under Ishihara. Yuka Yamada returned to supervise the series' scripts, Masumi Itō returned as music composer, and Miku Kadowaki and Nobuaki Maruki returned as character designer and chief animation director, respectively. The cast members also returned to reprise their roles. An original video animation was released with the special "Volume S" Blu-ray/DVD volume on 19 January 2022. The opening theme is "Ai no Supreme!" (愛のシュプリーム！, Ai no Shupurīmu!) by Fhána, and the ending theme for the first 11 episodes is "Maid With Dragons" by Super Chorogons (Tohru (Kuwahara), Kanna Kamui (Naganawa), Lucoa (Takahashi), Elma (Takada), and Ilulu (Tomomi Mineuchi)). On the season finale, "Aozora no Rhapsody" plays as the supreme ending theme.

== Series overview ==
Series	Episodes	Originally released	
Series	Episodes	First released	Last released
1	13	12 January 2017	6 April 2017
2	12	8 July 2021	23 September 2021

== Episode list ==
=== Season 1 (2017) ===
No. overall	No. in season	Title	Directed by	Written by	Original release date
1	1	"The Strongest Maid in History, Tohru! (Well, She is a Dragon)"; Transliteration: "Shijō Saikyō no Meido, Tōru! (Mā Doragon Desu Kara)" (Japanese: 史上最強のメイド、トール！（まあドラゴンですから）)	Haruka Fujita	Yuka Yamada	12 January 2017
Following a hangover, office worker Kobayashi is approached by a dragon named Tohru, who states that she had saved her life the previous night and offered to let her live with her as a maid. While initially reluctant to do so, Kobayashi decides to let Tohru stay with her after she helps her get to work on time, though quickly finds Tohru lacks experience as a maid. As Kobayashi goes to work the next day, Tohru stays to watch over her apartment, defending it from two burglars. Later, Tohru becomes jealous of Kobayashi's co-worker, Makoto Takiya, only to find he is nothing more than a drinking buddy and fellow maid otaku. Afterwards, Tohru uses her magic to blast the clouds blocking the sun so the laundry will dry faster, attracting the attention of another small dragon.
2	2	"Second Dragon, Kanna! (We're Totally Spoiling Here)"; Transliteration: "Daini no Doragon, Kanna! (Netabare Zenkai Desu ne)" (Japanese: 第二のドラゴン、カンナ！（ネタバレ全開ですね）)	Shinpei Sawa	Yuka Yamada	19 January 2017
Kobayashi goes with Tohru to the shopping district, finding she is quite friendly with the people there even after stopping a pickpocket with extreme force. Later, Kobayashi is approached by Tohru's friend from the dragon world, Kanna Kamui, who was exiled for pulling pranks. As Kanna lacks the magic needed to return home, Kobayashi offers to let her stay with her as well. Finding Tohru and Kanna's level of "playing around" to be a bit too extreme, Kobayashi teaches them how to have fun on a human scale. While Kobayashi is at work, Tohru attempts to teach Kanna what she knows about the human world, explaining how she wants to repay her debt to Kobayashi.
3	3	"Start of a New Life! (That Doesn't Go Well, Of Course)"; Transliteration: "Shin Seikatsu, Hajimaru! (Mochiron Umaku Ikimasen)" (Japanese: 新生活、はじまる！（もちろんうまくいきません）)	Noriyuki Kitanohara	Yasuhiro Takemoto	26 January 2017
Realising there is not enough room for herself and two dragons, Kobayashi decides to buy a larger apartment with a separate bedroom for Tohru and Kanna. Bothered by the loud noises from her new neighbors during a hangover, Kobayashi sends Tohru to try and get them to be more quiet, ultimately coming up with a more peaceful solution herself. Later, Kobayashi holds a party at her apartment, with Tohru inviting her fellow dragons, the cynical Fafnir and the well-endowed Quetzalcoatl, known as Lucoa for short.
4	4	"Kanna Goes to School! (Not That She Needs To)"; Transliteration: "Kanna, Gakkō ni Iku! (Sono Hitsuyō wa Nain Desu ga)" (Japanese: カンナ、学校に行く！（その必要はないんですが）)	Takuya Yamamura	Masashi Nishikawa	2 February 2017
Noticing Kanna staring longingly at passing students, Kobayashi and Tohru make arrangements for her to go to school, going with her to buy some supplies. On her first day of school, Kanna manages to make some friends, including classmate Riko Saikawa, while also receiving a keychain from Kobayashi. Later, Riko impulsively challenges some park-hogging delinquents to a game of dodgeball, prompting Tohru and the other dragons to join her team. After wiping the floor with the other team, the dragons decide to go against each other in a no-holds-barred battlefield.
5	5	"Tohru's Real World Lessons! (She Thinks She Understands It Already)"; Transliteration: "Tōru no Shakai Benkyō! (Honnin wa Dekiteru Tsumori Desu)" (Japanese: トールの社会勉強！（本人は出来てるつもりです）)	Taichi Ogawa	Fumihiko Shimo	9 February 2017
Using her perception blocking magic, Tohru sneaks into Kobayashi's office to see how she does her job, taking vengeance against a pushy chief when he keeps forcing Kobayashi to do his work for him. Later, Tohru helps Fafnir look for a place to live after he decides to stay in the human world, eventually setting him up to live with Makoto. After seeing a spoon bending magic trick on television, Tohru and Kanna go through a rather pointless training regime to learn how to do it themselves.
6	6	"Home Visit! (And Homes Not Visited)"; Transliteration: "Otaku Hōmon! (Shitenai Otaku mo Arimasu)" (Japanese: お宅訪問！（してないお宅もあります）)	Ichirō Miyoshi	Yuka Yamada	16 February 2017
Riko invites Kanna, Tohru, and Kobayashi to her house to meet her maid fanatic sister, Georgie. While the others talk about maids, Kanna and Riko get awfully close while playing games together. Later, Lucoa informs the others that she is now living with a young mage named Shōta Magatsuchi after she showed up during a demon summoning ritual. She brings Kobayashi and Tohru over to Shouta's house to try and prove that she isn't actually a demon, but her attempts to prove herself worthy of staying fail to convince him otherwise. Meanwhile, Fafnir gets used to living with Makoto as they spend most of their time playing games together.
7	7	"Summer's Staples! (The Fanservice Episode, Frankly)"; Transliteration: "Natsu no Teiban! (Butchake Tekoire-kai Desu ne)" (Japanese: 夏の定番！（ぶっちゃけテコ入れ回ですね）)	Noriyuki Kitanohara	Yasuhiro Takemoto	23 February 2017
Kobayashi and the others take a trip to the beach, where Tohru asks Kobayashi about her family while worrying about her own. Later, as Kobayashi and Tohru are called over to help Makoto sell his dōjinshi at Comiket, they discover that many of the cosplayers attending the event are actually magical creatures from Tohru's world using the opportunity of being surrounded by cosplayers to enjoy being in their real forms without attracting unwanted attention.
8	8	"New Dragon, Elma! (She's Finally Appearing, Huh?)"; Transliteration: "Arata Naru Doragon, Eruma! (Yatto Detekimashita ka)" (Japanese: 新たなるドラゴン、エルマ！（やっと出てきましたか）)	Naoko Yamada	Fumihiko Shimo	2 March 2017
Kobayashi and Tohru challenge each other to a cook-off to decide who will make a lunchbox for Kanna's field trip, with Tohru ultimately getting disqualified for using an otherworldly fruit for dessert. Later that night, Tohru's rival from an opposing faction, Elma, comes to try and force Tohru to return home, but Tohru puts an abrupt end to their battle. Unable to return to her world, Elma begins working under Kobayashi at her company, prompting some jealousy from Tohru.
9	9	"Sports Festival! (There's No Twist Or Anything)"; Transliteration: "Undōkai! (Hineri mo Nani mo Nai Desu ne)" (Japanese: 運動会！（ひねりも何もないですね）)	Shinpei Sawa	Yasuhiro Takemoto	9 March 2017
Kanna becomes downhearted when Kobayashi mentions she can't attend her school's sports festival due to work. Upon noticing Kanna hold back her selfishness after seeing how hard she works, Kobayashi works overtime in order to get the day off for the sports festival. During the festival, Kanna, Riko, and Shouta all take part in various events. During the final relay race, Riko falls behind after dropping her baton, but Kanna makes up the lost distance and wins the festival for her class.
10	10	"Troupe Dragon, On Stage! (They Had A Troupe Name, Huh)"; Transliteration: "Gekidan Doragon, On Sutēji! (Gekidan-mei Attan Desu ne)" (Japanese: 劇団ドラゴン、オンステージ！（劇団名あったんですね）)	Haruka Fujita	Masashi Nishikawa	16 March 2017
In the run-up to Christmas, Tohru is asked by one of the shopping district's retailers to put on a Christmas show for the elderly after he injures himself. Following Riko's suggestion, Tohru and the others decide to put on a play of The Little Match Girl, with Kanna cast in the lead role. Feeling the story wouldn't be interesting enough as it is, the dragons take some creative liberties with the script, resulting in an over-the-top story involving magical girls and demon lords that nonetheless proves a hit with the audience. Afterwards, Kobayashi and Tohru take in a Christmas flight, where they exchange presents.
11	11	"Year End, New Year! (No Comiket Bit This Time)"; Transliteration: "Nenmatsu Nenshi! (Komike Neta Arimasen)" (Japanese: 年末年始！（コミケネタありません）)	Takuya Yamamura	Yuka Yamada	23 March 2017
With the end of the year approaching, Kobayashi and the others spend most of their time relaxing under a kotatsu they had won in a lottery. On New Year's Eve, everyone gets together at the shrine to see the new year in before returning to Kobayashi's apartment to watch the first sunrise.
12	12	"Tohru and Kobayashi's Impactful Meeting! (We're Raising the Bar on Ourselves)"; Transliteration: "Tōru to Kobayashi, Kandō no Deai! (Jibun de Hādoru Agetemasu ne)" (Japanese: トールと小林、感動の出会い！（自分でハードル上げてますね）)	Taichi Ogawa	Masashi Nishikawa	30 March 2017
While Tohru prepares a special omurice for dinner, Kobayashi recalls the night she first met Tohru. After getting drunk and winding up in the mountains, Kobayashi came across Tohru, saving her life by pulling a holy sword out of her back, which Tohru says is only possible because Kobayashi does not believe in God, or the attempt would have killed her. After bonding with each other over drinks and realizing they were both alone, Kobayashi invited Tohru to stay with her as a maid. Later, Tohru tells Kobayashi about a human bandit she had met while in the dragon world, who influenced her to choose her own freedom and become a maid. Meanwhile, another dragon enters the human world.
13	13	"Emperor of Demise Arrives! (It Was the Final Episode Before We Knew It)"; Transliteration: "Shūentei, Kuru! (Kigatsukeba Saishukai Desu)" (Japanese: 終焉帝、来る！（気がつけば最終回です）)	Ichirō Miyoshi; Shinpei Sawa	Yuka Yamada	6 April 2017 (Note: This episode aired at 1:05 a.m. JST, an hour and 5 minutes after the original air time on Tokyo MX.)
As Tohru is faced with the inner turmoil over what would happen if she were to become separated from Kobayashi, her father, the Emperor of Demise, suddenly appears and drags her back to her world. After Kanna informs her that Tohru will likely be unable to return, Kobayashi struggles to get used to a life without Tohru. Some time later, Tohru escapes the other world to reunite with Kobayashi, but is quickly pursued by her father. Noticing Tohru's wishes to stay by her side, Kobayashi stands up to her father despite his overwhelming strength. Encouraged by Kobayashi's resolve, Tohru prepares to confront her father in battle, but Kobayashi gets between them, asking the father to have faith in his daughter's wishes and convincing him to leave her be. As life returns to normal, Kobayashi invites Tohru and Kanna to meet her parents.
14 (OVA)	14 (OVA)	"Valentines and Hot Springs! (Please Don't Get Your Hopes Up)"; Transliteration: "Barentain, Soshite Onsen! (Anmari Kitai Shinaide Kudasai)" (Japanese: バレンタイン、そして温泉！（あんまり期待しないでください）)	Noriyuki Kitanohara	Masashi Nishikawa	20 September 2017
On Valentine's Day, Tohru attempts to give Kobayashi some chocolates containing a love potion, but she quickly sees through her plan. However, Kobayashi ends up eating some of it after mistaking it for chocolate Kanna received, although the love potion gets cancelled out by some alcohol that was included in the chocolate. Later, Makoto invites everyone on a trip to a hot spring inn, where Tohru gives Kobayashi some regular chocolates.

=== Season 2: Miss Kobayashi's Dragon Maid S (2021) ===
No. overall	No. in season	Title	Directed by	Written by	Original release date
15	1	"New Dragon, Ilulu! (Please Be Nice to Her Again)"; Transliteration: "Arata Naru Doragon, Iruru! (Mata Yoroshiku Onegai Shimasu)" (Japanese: 新たなるドラゴン、イルル！（またよろしくお願いします）)	Tatsuya Ishihara	Yuka Yamada	8 July 2021
Tohru learns about a new Maid Café that's opened nearby and decides to work there during her free time. Kobayashi and Kanna drop by later to check on her just to find that she has become their head chef. Tohru uses dark magic to enchant the dishes served, which makes the café a success until she decides to quit, but reluctantly decides to teach the other maids to use dark magic as well. A few days later, Tohru and Kobayashi are attacked by Ilulu, an extremist from the Chaos Faction who berates Tohru for coexisting with humans. Tohru gets herself at a disadvantage against Ilulu as she protects the city from her attacks until Kobayashi enlists Elma's help by bribing her with sweets, allowing Tohru to fight with all her power and defeat Ilulu. Ilulu later returns and attempts to seduce Kobayashi but fails. Certain that Kobayashi has not fallen for her because she's also female, Ilulu retreats for a while, but not before transforming Kobayashi into a male.
16	2	"Hot Guy Kobayashi! (In Many Senses)"; Transliteration: "Ikemen, Kobayashi! (Ironna Imi de)" (Japanese: イケメン、小林！（いろんな意味で）)	Taichi Ogawa	Yuka Yamada	15 July 2021
After being transformed into a male, Kobayashi spends the day fighting "his" sexual urges until the spell Ilulu placed on "him" wears off. Afterward, Ilulu is targeted by Cremene, a dragon hunter from the Harmony Faction and Kobayashi steps in to protect her. After briefly escaping, Ilulu confesses to Kobayashi that she always wanted to coexist with humans, but other dragons always dissuaded her, especially after her parents were killed by humans. Cremene finds the duo and decides to kill both until Tohru arrives and defeats him. After recovering at home, Kobayashi befriends Ilulu, who moves into her apartment.
17	3	"Extracurricular Activities (Of Course They're Not Normal)"; Transliteration: "Kagai Katsudō (Mochiron Futsū ja Arimasen)" (Japanese: 課外活動（もちろん普通じゃありません）)	Noriyuki Kitanohara	Yuka Yamada; Masashi Nishikawa	22 July 2021
Kanna brings Riko home to play and introduces her to Ilulu. Ilulu wants to play with them, but is too shy to ask, until Lucoa pays a visit and encourages her. During a meeting with the others, Kobayashi's friends decide to design a maid uniform for her and on the occasion, she reveals the reason for her fondness for maid uniforms, despite not feeling pretty enough while wearing one. Bored with nothing to do when she is alone at home, Tohru looks for a new hobby until she is introduced to idol culture and decides to make merchandise and songs idolizing Kobayashi, much to Kobayashi and Kanna's chagrin.
18	4	"When in Rome, Do as the Romans Do (It's Hard to Match Others)"; Transliteration: "Gō ni Irite wa Gō ni Shitagae (Awaserutte Taihen Desu)" (Japanese: 郷に入りては郷に従え（合わせるって大変です）)	Shinpei Sawa	Masashi Nishikawa	29 July 2021
Elma challenges Kobayashi for a duel at work until Kobayashi realizes that Elma is just worried about her well-being due to a misunderstanding, and reassures her. Later, Tohru and Elma take part in the neighborhood watch and encounter some dragon-themed thugs, who mend their ways after Tohru easily defeats their leader. Afterward, Tohru and Kobayashi take Kanna, Riko, and Ilulu to the amusement park and enjoy some fun time together.
19	5	"Together With You (Well, If We Get Along)"; Transliteration: "Kimi to Issho ni (Mā Ki ga Aeba Desu ga)" (Japanese: 君と一緒に（まあ気が合えばですが）)	Noriyuki Kitanohara	Fumihiko Shimo	5 August 2021
Tohru and Elma tell Kobayashi the story of how they met and traveled together until they eventually parted ways due to their differences. Later, Ilulu starts working at a candy shop after being recommended by Tohru to look for a job. Taketo Aida, the grandson of the shop's owner, is tasked to teach Ilulu the ways of her new occupation and the two quickly become close.
20	6	"Uncanny Relationships (One Side Is a Dragon)"; Transliteration: "Aienkien (Katahō wa Doragon Desu)" (Japanese: 合縁奇縁（片方はドラゴンです）)	Takuya Yamamura	Yuka Yamada	12 August 2021
Fed up with being teased by Lucoa, Shouta looks for any weak point of her to have an advantage, but to no avail. Lucoa later explains to Shouta that her real weakness is to lose the place she calls home, revealing that she is only beside Shouta because she likes him. Meanwhile, Takiya attempts to have Fafnir vacate his apartment during his parents' visit but he refuses. Consulting with Shouta, Takiya obtains a magic orb to force Fafnir into a contract, but he refuses the attempt to subdue his friend, and they decide to settle the matter with a game. After hearing from a classmate that he once walked a long way from home, Riko and Kanna decide to walk the same path together, but on their way they stumble upon Elma in dragon form and Kanna convinces Riko that it was just CG.
21	7	"Common Sense (It's Different For Everyone)"; Transliteration: "Ippan Jōshiki (Minna Zuretemasu)" (Japanese: 一般常識（みんなずれてます）)	Minoru Ōta	Fumihiko Shimo; Masashi Nishikawa	19 August 2021
Fafnir requests Lucoa's help to model for a manga he's drawing for an upcoming doujinshi convention. She agrees to help, even though she finds the story confusing (unaware of the connection to her relationship with Shouta), and the art unappealing. She decides to join Fafnir and Takiya in selling a book of cosplay photos, which completely sells out while Fafnir's still unable to sell anything. After sleeping in on her day off, Kobayashi talks with Tohru about what sleep is like for dragons, leading her to reflect with the other dragons about why they've started to sleep more often in the human world. Kanna, Riko, and three of their classmates decide to investigate ghosts for a class project, after hearing rumors of one being in the school. The students search after school where they learn the noise is just a broken window, however, Kanna discovers the true culprit is a fairy that got stuck in their world. Ilulu uses her magic to send the fairy back, and the students decide to investigate space next.
22	8	"The World's Only (Insert Phrase You Like Here)"; Transliteration: "Sekai ni Hitotsu Dake no (Suki na Kotoba o Tsuzukete Kudasai)" (Japanese: 世界に一つだけの（好きな言葉を続けてください）)	Shinpei Sawa	Masashi Nishikawa	26 August 2021
Shouta tries to create a talisman for his dad for Father's Day, which Lucoa confuses as him making her a gift for "Tits Day". She asks to help but he insists to do it on his own. After several failed attempts, he seeks advice from Takiya, whose words inspire Shouta to go for a different approach, successfully creating the talisman. Kobayashi comes down with a cold, causing Tohru to worry about how to take care of her. Worried about her worsening state, Tohru returns to her world in search of a cure. By the time she returns, Kobayashi has started to feel better, and not wanting her to worry, takes the medicine she finds, which accidentally gives her cat ears and a tail. At her job, Ilulu notices a doll left behind and decides to look for its owner when they don't return. During the search, Take meets Kobayashi for the first time and becomes confused by their relationship. Despite it being seemingly fruitless, Ilulu persists, due to her own regretful feelings about abandoning a doll her old human friends had given her; seeing this Take continues to help. They successfully track down the owner who apologizes for initially abandoning it and thanks Ilulu for returning it.
23	9	"There Are Various Reasons Behind It (It's Full of Elma)"; Transliteration: "Iroiro Wake ga Arimashite (Eruma Zanmai Desu)" (Japanese: いろいろワケがありまして（エルマざんまいです）)	Minoru Ōta	Yuka Yamada	2 September 2021
Elma tries to fight for better working conditions at her and Kobayashi's job, constantly re-writing her proposals whenever they're criticized or rejected. Her attempts lead them to have an encounter with their boss, Shouta's father, who knows about the dragons living in their world. Ultimately, even after starting up a labor union, all the proposals are promptly shut down by their boss, though it's revealed Elma just wanted to use it so she can get the station's limited sweets. Kanna, Riko, and Shouta ask Elma to chaperone them to go on a picnic since Kobayashi and Tohru are busy. The three sneak away at some point, and worried about being called useless by Tohru, Elma anxiously tries to find them, leading her to once again almost reveal herself as a dragon in front of Riko. Sometime later, Tohru and Elma have a training duel, watched over by Fafnir and Kobayashi. The two unleash their pent-up aggressions toward each other, leading Elma to admit how much she missed Tohru and just wanted to be friends with her again. The two reconcile and go back to their playful fighting. They fight and the fight ends in a tie. To decide a winner Kobayashi holds another contest. The scene goes to Tohru and Elma holding their faces but are not able to hold it any longer as it reveals both dragons are barefooted and Ilulu and Kanna are tickling the soles of their bare feet and both Tohru and Elma laugh a lot while Kobayashi declares it a draw the episode ends with both Tohru and Elma laughing while Ilulu and Kanna continue to tickle the soles of their bare feet.
24	10	"Kanna's Summer Break (Broadcast In Two Languages!?)"; Transliteration: "Kanna no Natsuyasumi (Nika Kokugo Hōsō Desu!?)" (Japanese: カンナの夏休み（二か国語放送です!?）)	Taichi Ogawa	Masashi Nishikawa	9 September 2021
After a fight with Kobayashi, Kanna runs away and ends up in New York City. While there she meets a girl named Chloe, the daughter of a wealthy businessman, who she saves from a group of the mafia. The two spend the day playing around together until Kanna realizes she needs to return home and apologize to Kobayashi. The mafia men suddenly kidnap Chloe, so Kanna transforms into a dragon and scares them all off, before flying Chloe home, who had initially run away too. Kanna returns home to a sleeping Kobayashi and Tohru (who had been secretly watching over Kanna the whole time). During Summer Break, with Tohru and Ilulu at work and Saikawa on a family trip, Kobayashi and Kanna are left alone to relax at home. They decide to head outside where they spend the day exploring, studying manholes, and watching out for the rain, before returning home.
25	11	"Premium Seat (No Extra Charge)"; Transliteration: "Puremiamu Shīto (Tokubetsu Ryōkin wa Kakarimasen)" (Japanese: プレミアムシート（特別料金はかかりません）)	Noriyuki Kitanohara	Fumihiko Shimo	16 September 2021
Kobayashi suffers from low back pain because of the heavy workload and bad sitting posture and tries to relieve it by buying a lot of massage devices and having a massage by Ilulu and Kanna. Tohru also tries to help by feeding her tail and medicines from her world but gives up after asking Takiya and Elma. Finally, she finds out that her tail is the best massage chair for Kobayashi. After finding out about the similarities between the spell and coding languages, Kobayashi is suggested by Shouta's father to learn about Tohru's story. She then meets the Emperor of Demise, who tells her Tohru's story from his perspective as the leader of the Chaos faction. After that, Kobayashi hears the story again from Tohru herself to understand her feelings.
26	12	"Life is Constant Change (But It's Okay To Stop And Appreciate It)"; Transliteration: "Seiseiruten (Demo Tachidomaru no mo Ari Desu ka ne)" (Japanese: 生生流転（でも立ち止まるのもありですかね）)	Tatsuya Ishihara	Yuka Yamada	23 September 2021
After hearing everything about Tohru's story, Kobayashi starts to feel anxious regarding whether she deserves to be loved by someone like Tohru, especially with how well she's integrated herself into the human world. The group attends the Summer Festival where Tohru is assisting the maid cafe with their stall. Kanna and Saikawa wish to continue growing up together, Ilulu tells Take about how Kobayashi helped her rediscover her childish side, and Elma and Lucoa talk about the differences between their worlds' festivals. When Tohru finishes working, Kobayashi asks her to walk together alone, where she airs out her worries. Tohru once again states her love for Kobayashi as the fireworks go off. Sometime later, Lucoa invites everyone to a flower viewing in the dragon world. Tohru sets up the party in dedication to Kobayashi, including drinking, eating, and an arm-wrestling contest. By the end, Tohru reveals the party as a set-up for her and Kobayashi's wedding ceremony, transforming them both into wedding dresses. Kobayashi runs away and smiles, as everyone gives chase.
27 (OVA)	13 (OVA)	"Japanese Hospitality (My Attendant is a Dragon)"; Transliteration: "Nippon no Omotenashi (Atendo wa Doragon Desu)" (Japanese: ニッポンのおもてなし（アテンドはドラゴンです）)	Shinpei Sawa	Masashi Nishikawa	19 January 2022
Kanna's friend Chloe, who she met in New York City, came to Tokyo for a trip. They go to Akihabara and explore the Virtual reality game, play the Gashapon machine and try street foods. Chloe also experiences the daily life of Kanna and Riko, ending the trip with a fireworks party at Kobayashi's apartment rooftop. Chloe then returns back to her hometown in Minnesota.

== Other series ==
=== Miss Kobayashi's Dragon ○○ ===
No.	Title	Directed by (Note: Information is taken from the ending credits of each episode.)	Written by	Original release date
1	"Miss Kobayashi's Dragon ○○"; Transliteration: "Kobayashi-san Chi no Maru Maru Doragon" (Japanese: 小林さんちの○○ドラゴン)	Takuya Yamamura	Yuka Yamada	15 March 2017
Tohru and Kanna play around with replacing the "maid" part of the series' title with other words, like 'band', 'avocado', 'India', 'Iceland', 'New Zealand' and cosplaying them.
2	"Miss Kobayashi's Dragon Animal"; Transliteration: "Kobayashi-san Chi no Animaru Doragon" (Japanese: 小林さんちのアニマルドラゴン)	Shinpei Sawa	Masashi Nishikawa	19 April 2017
Tohru, Kanna & Lucoa dress as different animals, but Lucoa's constumes are rather skimpy.
3	"Miss Kobayashi's Dragon Uniform"; Transliteration: "Kobayashi-san Chi no Seifuku Doragon" (Japanese: 小林さんちの制服ドラゴン)	Shinpei Sawa	Masashi Nishikawa	17 May 2017
Tohru, Kanna & Lucoa cosplay different uniforms, like nurses and flight-attendants, and enact what they're dressed as, much to Kobayashi's chagrin.
4	"Miss Kobayashi's Dragon Battle"; Transliteration: "Kobayashi-san Chi no Batoru Doragon" (Japanese: 小林さんちのバトルドラゴン)	Noriyuki Kitanohara; Shinpei Sawa	Masashi Nishikawa	21 June 2017
With the help of Takiya, Elma and Fafnir, Tohru enacts different styles of dueling, like Far-West's shoot-out or Samurais' sword fighting.
5	"Miss Kobayashi's Dragon Sports"; Transliteration: "Kobayashi-san Chi no Supōtsu Doragon" (Japanese: 小林さんちのスポーツドラゴン)	Shinpei Sawa	Masashi Nishikawa	19 July 2017
Tohru, Kanna, and Elma compete in different sports, but Elma's horn gets in the way.
6	"Miss Kobayashi's Dragon Mystery"; Transliteration: "Kobayashi-san Chi no Misuterī Doragon" (Japanese: 小林さんちのミステリードラゴン)	Shinpei Sawa	Masashi Nishikawa	18 August 2017
Tohru, Kanna, and Lucoa enact different detective-themed scenarios.
7	"Miss Kobayashi's Dragon Wedding"; Transliteration: "Kobayashi-san Chi no Wedingu Doragon" (Japanese: 小林さんちのウェディングドラゴン)	Shinpei Sawa	Masashi Nishikawa	20 September 2017
Weddings from different cultures with Tohru, Kanna, Elma and Lucoa as brides and Kobayashi as the groom.

=== Miss Kobayashi's Dragon Maid S shorts ===
No.	Title	Original release date
1	"Typical Morning (Every Day is Everyday)"; Transliteration: "Itsumo no Asa (Mainichi ga Eburidei Desu)" (Japanese: いつもの朝（毎日がエブリデイです）)	7 April 2021
Tohru purposefully wakes Kobayashi late so she can fly her to work.
2	"Relaxation (What is comfort...?)" Transliteration: "Rirakuzēshon (Iyashi to wa...)" (Japanese: リラクゼーション（癒しとは…）)	14 April 2021
Tohru and Kanna decide to cosplay to greet Kobayashi after work. The first day they dress as victorian maids, but as days go by their cosplay gets more and more exotic.
3	"Seeking a Place of Rest (And It Was Already There)"; Transliteration: "Ansoku no Chi o Motomete (Soshite, Sore wa Soko ni Atta)" (Japanese: 安息の地を求めて（そして、それはそこにあった）)	21 April 2021
On a lazy day, Tohru and Kanna bring Kobayashi to different locations to bask in the sun.
4	"Freedom of Expression (The Apple of My Eye)"; Transliteration: "Hyōgen no Jiyū (Me ni Irete mo Itaku Nai wa)" (Japanese: 表現の自由（目に入れても痛くないわ）)	28 April 2021
At school, Kanna's class does scenery-sketching, clay-sculpturing and self-portraits. Her classmate Riko Saikawa is consistent about her interests.
5	"State of Emergency (I Have an Uninterruptible Power Supply)"; Transliteration: "Hijō Jitai (Mu-teiden Dengen Sōchi wa Aru de Yansu)" (Japanese: 非常事態（無停電電源装置はあるでヤンス）)	5 May 2021
Unable to play video games because of a black-out, Takiya and Fafnir find an alternate way to compete against each other.
6	"True Identity Revealed (I Wish I Never Saw It)"; Transliteration: "Shōtai Mitari (Minakerya Yokatta)" (Japanese: 正体見たり（見なけりゃよかった）)	12 May 2021
Fafnir meets the members of his virtual guild in real life.
7	"Squish (Squish♥ Squish♥ Squish♥)"; Transliteration: "Punyu (Punyu♡Punyu♡Punyu♡)" (Japanese: ぷにゅ（ぷにゅ♡ぷにゅ♡ぷにゅ♡）)	19 May 2021
Kanna constantly gets "hypnotized" by the television during meals, so Kobayashi wakes her up by poking the little dragon's face.
8	"Time Signal (It's Convenient in a Sense)"; Transliteration: "Jihō (Aru Imi Benri Desu)" (Japanese: 時報（ある意味便利です）)	26 May 2021
After Elma's stomach growls at meals' times, as she is hungry because she has no money for food, she is fed sweets by her coworkers.
9	"Makeover (You're Kewt, Miss Kobayashi)"; Transliteration: "Imēji Chenji (Kyawawa Desu Kobayashi-san)" (Japanese: イメージチェンジ（キャワワです 小林さん）)	2 June 2021
Kanna arranges Kobayashi's hair in cute hairstyles.
10	"Gen Ed (Humans Are so Difficult)"; Transliteration: "Pankyō (Ningentte Mendō Desu ne)" (Japanese: パンキョー（人間って面倒ですね）)	9 June 2021
Tohru gives her fellow dragons a "Seminar on How to Behave in Human Society".
11	"Saikawa-Paisen (An Unlikely Pairing)"; Transliteration: "Saikawa-Paisen (Masaka no Kumiawase Desu)" (Japanese: 才川パイセン（まさかの組み合わせです）)	16 June 2021
Lucoa gets advice about elementary school boys from Kanna's classmate, Riko Saikawa.
12	"Customer Satisfaction (This Is How It Should Be)"; Transliteration: "Kokyaku Manzokudo (Konna no de Yoin da yo)" (Japanese: 顧客満足度（こんなので良いんだよ）)	23 June 2021
Kobayashi is dissatisfied with the bentos (lunch boxes) Tohru makes her.
13	"Honeymoon (Of Course, That's How It Ends)"; Transliteration: "Hanīmūn (Kekkyoku Kō Narimasu)" (Japanese: ハニームーン（結局こうなります）)	30 June 2021
Kanna is staying over at Riko's house, so Tohru wants to go on a date with Kobayashi.
SP1	"Feigned Maneuver (I'll Allow it Since it's Cute.)"; Transliteration: "Gisō Kōsaku (Kawaii no de Yuru Shimasu)" (Japanese: 偽装工作（可愛いので許します）)	8 July 2021
Kanna pretends to fall asleep on the living room's couch.
SP2	"Unconditional Love (It's Warm, Even When Wet)"; Transliteration: "Mushō no Ai (Nurete mo Atatakai)" (Japanese: 無償の愛（濡れても温かい）)	11 August 2021
On a rainy day after school, Kanna and Riko Saikawa share an umbrella.
SP3	"Written As "Powerful Enemy" (And Read As "Friend")"; Transliteration: "Kyōteki to Kaite (Nakayoshi to Yomimasu)" (Japanese: 強敵と書いて（仲良しと読みます）)	9 September 2021
Tohru and Elma have heated competitions in the shopping district.
EX1	"Even If Series (It's a Drunkard's Delusion)"; Transliteration: "Moshi mo Shirīzu (Nondakure no Mōsō Desu)" (Japanese: もしもシリーズ（飲んだくれの妄想です）)	15 September 2021
EX2	"Influencer (If You Eat With This)"; Transliteration: "Infuruensā (Kore de Tabete Ikereba)" (Japanese: インフルエンサー（これで食べていければ）)	20 October 2021
EX3	"Entrainment Pressure (It's a Humanized Dragon)"; Transliteration: "Dōchō Atsuryoku (Hitoka Suru Doragon Desu)" (Japanese: 同調圧力（人化するドラゴンです）)	17 November 2021
EX4	"Demand and Supply (I Can't Have my Way With Them)"; Transliteration: "Juyō to Kyōkyū (Mamanaranai Mono de Yansu)" (Japanese: 需要と供給（ままならないものでヤンス）)	15 December 2021
EX5	"Training (I Cannot Concentrate)"; Transliteration: "Torēningu (Shūchū wa Dekimasen)" (Japanese: トレーニング（集中はできません）)	19 January 2022
