= Cyrene (Honkai: Star Rail) =

Video game character

- Honkai character
- Official artwork of Cyrene in her playable form
- First game: Honkai: Star Rail (2025)
- Voiced by: EN: Aiden Dawn; ZH: Yanning; JA: Marina Inoue; KO: Jo Kyoung-i

In-universe information
- Aliases: Demiurge, Mem, PhiLia093
- Species: Memetic entity; Memosprite (Mem); Titan (Demiurge)
- Weapon: Bow
- Home: Amphoreus
- Type: Ice
- Path: Remembrance

Cyrene (/ˌsaɪ.ˈriː.niː/, sai-REE-nee, Chinese: 昔涟; pinyin: Xīlián) is a character in the video game Honkai: Star Rail, developed by miHoYo. She is a central character in the portion of the game that takes place on the fictional planet of Amphoreus. She accompanies the protagonist Trailblazer throughout Amphoreus in the form of a creature called Mem (迷迷; Mímí), who eventually transforms into her playable humanoid form. Eventually, Cyrene helps the Trailblazer and friends save Amphoreus from a threat known as Irontomb. Cyrene first appeared as Mem in version 3.0 of the game, and she officially became playable in version 3.7 of the game in November 2025.

Cyrene is a variant of Elysia, a character from Honkai Impact 3rd. She was generally well received by critics, who praised her character development and strength in combat. Her character development was described as non-linear, and reviewers tended to compare her story to themes of love, memory and romance. Her resemblance to Elysia was also analyzed, and reviewers agreed that there was a strong resemblance between the two characters.

== Design and voice acting ==
Cyrene first appeared in version 3.0 of the game in November 2024 in the form of a memosprite named Mem. Memosprites are a type of familiar or summon belonging to characters who follow the Path of Remembrance. From that point on, she accompanied the Trailblazer as a companion throughout the Amphoreus arc of the game's storyline. On September 9, 2025, miHoYo released her adult character illustration and basic profile, revealing her rarity and damage type. The official artwork showcased multiple different forms of Cyrene across different periods, including her earlier childlike appearance and Mem, in addition to her playable form. Unlike other characters from Amphoreus, her promotional art did not specify any sort of divine authority or affiliated city-state; it instead used question marks to hint that her origin was different from them. On October 25, the developers revealed her combat abilities during a promotional livestream. Cyrene was officially released as a playable character on November 5 in version 3.7 of the game.

In November 2025, Honkai: Star Rail launched a promotional campaign on social media titled "Pink Energy Charging" centered on Cyrene, which drew participation from official accounts of other games including Final Fantasy XIV and Warframe. On November 4, miHoYo released her character trailer, "With You Once More", depicting Cyrene imagining herself traveling aboard the Astral Express train with the Trailblazer and visiting various planets; the video also hid a message in Morse code that spelled out "see you tomorrow". On the same day, the company began a companion livestream event titled "The Longest Night" which simulated the in-story deletion of Amphoreus' data by the enemy Irontomb. As the stream progressed, trailers for past versions of the game were gradually hidden and the thumbnails and titles of several character trailers were altered; the deletions caused some players on Douyin to report the livestream to prevent the videos from being deleted. The following day, miHoYo released the 2D animated short "Hello, World" as the conclusion for the version 3.7 main story. Its accompanying single, "Ripple of Past Reverie", was released in two languages: it was performed in English by Cassie Wei, lead vocalist of the band Mili, and in Chinese by Angela Chang. Beginning November 9, the company launched a four-city touring event called "As We've Written" at Wanda Plaza in Shanghai, featuring a life-sized Cyrene model. Later that month, the Japanese fashion magazine Nylon published an issue in which Cyrene featured on the front cover and participated in a fictional interview, in which she described her name as meaning "ripples of the past".

Cyrene is voiced in English by Aiden Dawn, in Chinese by Yanning, in Japanese by Marina Inoue, and in Korean by Jo Kyoung-i. Cyrene's character design is inspired by Elysia from Honkai Impact 3rd, whom Yanning and Inoue also voiced. In an interview discussing her performance, Yanning stated that Cyrene differs greatly from her own personality, offering a fresh acting experience; she described the character as emotionally nuanced and layered, and said the recording process was enjoyable. Inoue said that Cyrene was a girl who cherishes small, everyday moments and maintains hope despite enduring hardship, and invited players to witness the final chapter of Amphoreus for themselves.

== Appearances ==
=== Story ===
Mem (left), and Cyrene's childlike appearance as an NPC (right)

Cyrene is a central figure in the Amphoreus arc of the game's main storyline. Amphoreus is a civilization sealed within a closed computer-like system, where numerous characters establish city-states and belief systems, yet are bound by the same rules to repeatedly face collapse and then reboot. Amphoreus' ultimate fate leads toward the birth of the Lord Ravager, Irontomb, which would bring about the planet's annihilation. (Note: In the game's lore, the title "Lord Ravager" refers to those chosen by Nanook, the Aeon of Destruction, to bring destruction to the universe.) To prevent this, Cyrene chooses to sacrifice herself by initiating a brutal, long-term cycle: Amphoreus continually resets, and at the end of each iteration she willingly uploads all of Amphoreus' accumulated memories into the system, before she herself is formatted and reinserted into the next cycle.

Cyrene's original form was an experimental entity designated "PhiLia093". She was designed to simulate the Path of Remembrance, driven by compassion as her core impulse. Through repeated data input and observation, she gradually developed empathy beyond what her programming had intended. Across countless cycles and accumulated memories, she witnessed and recorded the experiences of all beings on Amphoreus, repeatedly choosing to upload her memories, be reset, and re-enter the loop, thereby sustaining the cycle itself. These uploaded memories were also stored in Amphoreus' core, later becoming the key material that filled the void of the Genesis Titan, Demiurge (德谬歌; Démiùgē) and enabled its awakening. Described as the "heart of Amphoreus", Demiurge represents the world's core consciousness. However, after an explosion by a Stellaron wiped the core layer clean, this "heart" became an empty void, accelerating the planet's descent towards destruction. Over more than thirty million cycles, the memories Cyrene uploaded gradually accumulated within the core, filling Demiurge's emptiness and allowing it to awaken and learn what it means to love.

With her blessing, the Demiurge inherits Cyrene's name and escapes the core layer, eventually manifesting as the memosprite Mem and encountering the Trailblazer. Throughout the Amphoreus story arc, Mem accumulates new experiences and emotional memories, transforming into Cyrene's childlike form and eventually into her adult form. Mem eventually becomes the "greater Cyrene" that inherits Cyrene's memories. When the story reaches the final battle, the Trailblazer fights alongside Cyrene and successfully defeats Irontomb. After the battle, Cyrene travels backward from the future into the past, carefully setting events into motion so that what were once believed to be divine revelations and miracles come to pass. Moving backward in time causes Cyrene to gradually lose her memories and power, ultimately reverting into both the original "PhiLia093" and the Demiurge that would eventually meet the Trailblazer. The story repeats itself, and after Irontomb is defeated again, Amphoreus' closed causal loop is completed. In a side quest, Herta indicates that Amphoreus will become a real planet and not a simulation eventually, but is uncertain about when this would happen.

=== Gameplay ===
Cyrene is a 5-star Ice-type character following the Path of Remembrance, who serves as a support role in combat. While she is on the field, she can increase the entire team's damage, and some allies' actions also generate energy for her ultimate. When she uses her ultimate, Cyrene simultaneously triggers all allies' ultimates and deploys a field that grants additional damage to the party's attacks. Her kit is designed around the Chrysos Heirs of Amphoreus, providing tailored buffs based on the identities of different members of that group if they are in the team.

== Reception ==
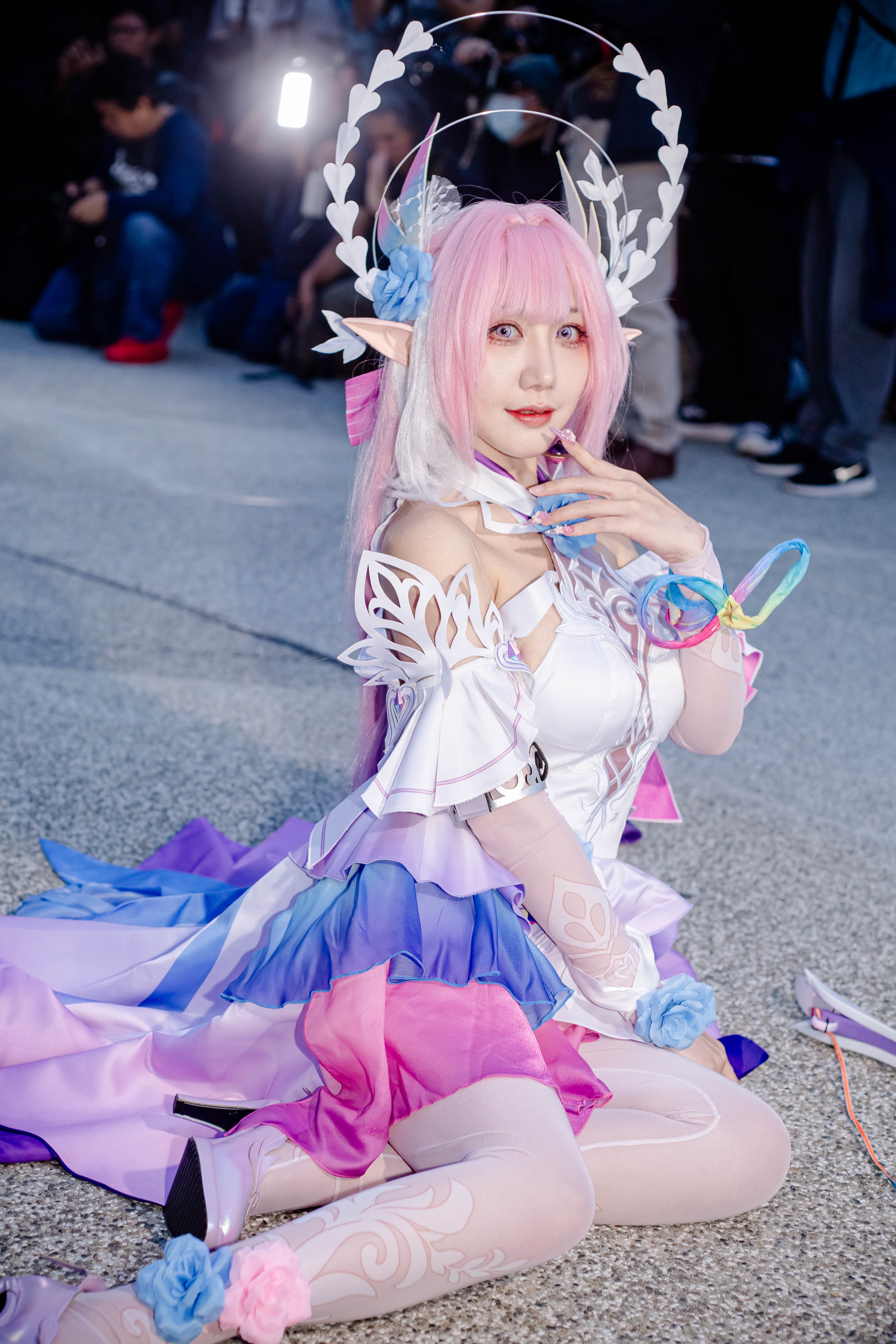
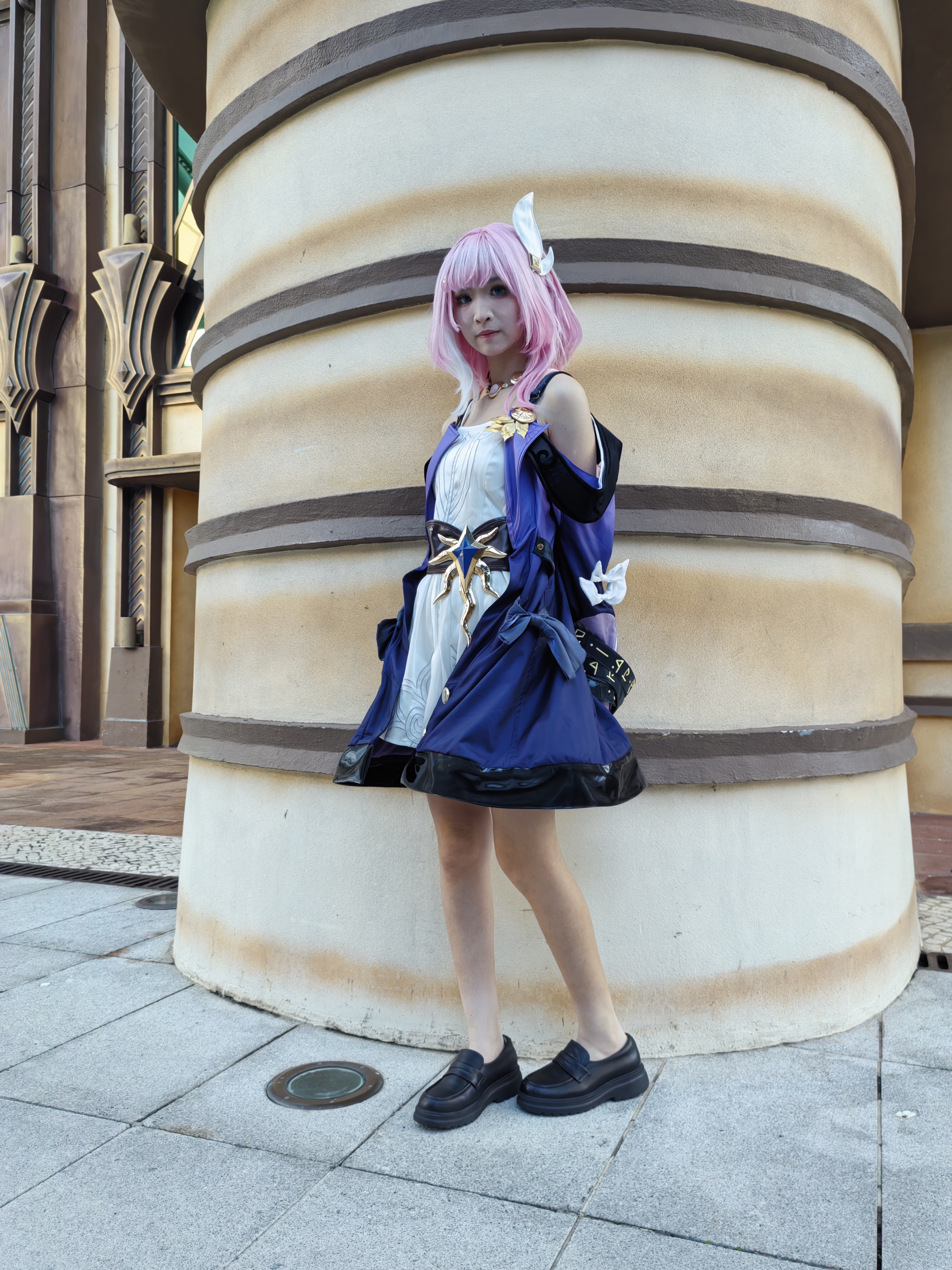
Cosplayers dressed as Cyrene in her adult form (left) and childlike form (right)

Cyrene has been well received by players and critics, with fans expressing admiration through cosplay and fan creations. On the day she became playable, Honkai: Star Rail reached number one on the iOS top-grossing charts. As the Amphoreus story arc neared its conclusion, creators on Douyin initiated a collaborative fan project centered on Cyrene, in which participants collectively colored a large group illustration within five days. The project later expanded into Live2D animations, fan-made music videos, cosplay photography, and 3D modeling.

Regarding her role in the story, Game Teahouse reviewer Wu Yan described her development as non-linear, describing how her depiction evolves from Mem's initial cuteness and companionship, to her resolve as a Chrysos Heir, to the mystery surrounding Demiurge. He called the reveal of her true identity powerful. Wu also argued that Cyrene "gave Amphoreus' year-long narrative its soul" and compared her story to the film Interstellar, since both it and Honkai: Star Rail use a rigorous science fiction framework to explore the emotional theme of love. A reviewer from Gamersky opined that Cyrene's character explores how shared memory and emotional bonds constitute true existence. They wrote that across more than 30 million cycles, Cyrene's sacrifices transform personal compassion into a greater love, ultimately granting her the power to become an Emanator. The reviewer also wrote that Cyrene's line in the trailer for version 3.0 of the game which mentioned a romantic story became widely referenced among players, and they described the narrative as employing a structure that connects the character's beginning and end. They characterized Cyrene's multi-version development as carefully planned.

Cyrene takes inspiration from Elysia from Honkai Impact 3rd in terms of character design and is seen as her counterpart or expy. Pocket Tactics reviewer Daz Skubich said that Cyrene's appearance across different iterations of her outfit closely mirrors Elysia, and that there are clear parallels between the two. Esports.gg reviewer XC Enriquez similarly observed a strong visual connection between the two characters. Jinghe reviewer Qian Hongyan wrote that while miHoYo has previously found commercial success with counterpart characters across other games in the Honkai series, this approach showed what they called "cracks" with Cyrene: some players felt that her personality and dialogue overlapped too heavily with Elysia's, resisting attempts to tie the two strongly together. In response, the game only revealed the first part of Cyrene's true name "Ely" and addressed the issue through her dialogue. Elysia was not the only character to whom Cyrene was compared, as one fan theory suggested that she and the game's mascot, March 7th, could be the same person, although this theory was proven false. Other fan theories indicate that she was a childhood friend of the character Phainon as shown in one of the game's cutscenes.

Regarding her gameplay, ScreenRant reviewer Bruno Yonezawa described Cyrene (based on pre-release information) as the strongest support character in the game and argued that her buffs for Chrysos Heir teammates surpassed those of previous top-tier support characters. He predicted that she would be unlikely to be surpassed within a year and called her the "ultimate powercreep for supports". He also called her "the best character of 2025". Some outlets, however, expressed reservations about her versatility: GameRant reviewer Nahda Nabiilah argued that Cyrene was only worth acquiring if a player already had several Chrysos Heir characters. XC Enriquez of Esports.gg described the buffs Cyrene provides as "crazy" and "insane".
