= Fumihiko Shimo =

Japanese anime screenwriter

- Occupations: Screenwriter; Novelist

Fumihiko Shimo (志茂 文彦, Shimo Fumihiko) is a Japanese anime screenwriter and novelist, best known for writing the scripts for Kyoto Animation's anime adaptations of Key visual novels.

== Novels ==
- Ajisai no Kisetsu ni Bokura wa Kannō Suru (あじさいの季節に僕らは感応する), illustrated by You Shiina (July 2014, Famitsu Bunko, ISBN 9784047297821)

== Screenwriting ==
Head writer credits are denoted in bold.

=== Television ===
- Wrestler Gundan Gingahen Seisenshi Robin Jr. (1989–1990)
- Brave Exkaiser (1990–1991)
- The Brave Fighter of Sun Fighbird (1991)
- Matchless Raijin-Oh (1991–1992)
- Magical Princess Minky Momo: Hold on to Your Dreams (1992)
- The Brave Fighter of Legend Da-Garn (1992)
- Genki Bakuhatsu Ganbaruger (1992–1993)
- Tetsujin 28 FX (1992–1993)
- Nekketsu Saikyō Go-Saurer (1993–1994)
- Mobile Fighter G Gundam (1994–1995)
- **Raideen the Superior** (1996–1997)
- Anime Ganbare Goemon (1997–1998)
- Futari Kurashi (1998)
- **Generator Gawl** (1998)
- **Space Pirate Mito** (1999)
- **Dai-Guard** (1999–2000)
- Bikkuriman 2000 (1999–2001)
- Shin Megami Tensei: Devil Children (2000–2001)
- Hamtaro (2000–2004)
- Baki the Grappler (2001)
- The Prince of Tennis (2001–2005)
- **Full Metal Panic!** (2002)
- **Gravion** (2002)
- Shin Megami Tensei: Devil Children – Light & Dark (2002–2003)
- **Full Metal Panic? Fumoffu** (2003)
- **Burst Angel** (2004)
- **Gravion Zwei** (2004)
- Full Metal Panic! The Second Raid (2005)
- **Air** (2005)
- **Idaten Jump** (2005–2006)
- Fate/stay night (2006)
- The Melancholy of Haruhi Suzumiya (2006, 2009)
- **Kanon** (2006–2007)
- When They Cry: Kai (2007)
- **Clannad** (2007–2009)
- Umineko When They Cry (2009)
- Fairy Tail (2009–2016, 2018–2019)
- **Infinite Stratos** (2011)
- **Kokoro Connect** (2012)
- The Pet Girl of Sakurasou (2012)
- Majestic Prince (2013)
- Non Non Biyori (2013)
- **Golden Time** (2013)
- **Engaged to the Unidentified** (2014)
- **Amagi Brilliant Park** (2014)
- **Aria the Scarlet Ammo AA** (2015)
- **Myriad Colors Phantom World** (2016)
- **Magic of Stella** (2016)
- **New Game!** (2016–2017)
- Miss Kobayashi's Dragon Maid (2017)
- **The Ryuo's Work Is Never Done!** (2018)
- **Miss Caretaker of Sunohara-sou** (2018)
- **Anima Yell!** (2018)
- Wataten!: An Angel Flew Down to Me (2019)
- **How Heavy Are the Dumbbells You Lift?** (2019)
- **Diary of Our Days at the Breakwater** (2020)
- **Bofuri** (2020)
- **Ikebukuro West Gate Park** (2020)
- **Talentless Nana** (2020)
- **Bottom-tier Character Tomozaki** (2021–2024)
- Miss Kobayashi's Dragon Maid S (2021)
- Shaman King (2021–2022)
- **Don't Hurt Me, My Healer!** (2022)
- **Date A Live IV** (2022)
- **Villainess Level 99** (2024)
- **Date A Live V** (2024)
- **Everyone's Darling Has a Secret** (2027)

=== OVAs ===
- Ozanari Dungeon: The Tower of Wind (1991)
- Time Stranger Kyoko: Leave It to Chocola (2001)
- Higurashi When They Cry: Kira (2011–2012)

=== Films ===
- The Prince of Tennis: A Gift from Atobe (2005)
- The Disappearance of Haruhi Suzumiya (2010)
- Garakowa: Restore the World (2015)
- Date A Live F Last Date (2027)
