= Date A Live season 5 =

2024 Japanese anime series

Date A Live V
- Season 5
- Fifth season anime key visual
- No. of episodes: 12

Release
- Original network: AT-X
- Original release: April 10 – June 26, 2024

Season chronology
- ← Previous; Date A Live IV

The fifth season of the Date A Live anime series, titled Date A Live V, is produced by Geek Toys and directed by Jun Nakagawa, adapting volumes 17 to 19 of the light novel series of the same name. This season follows Shido Itsuka and the Spirits, supernatural female entities that have fallen in love with him, in the final battle against Sir Isaac Ray Pelham Westcott and his subordinates at DEM Industries, who intent to exploit the power of the Spirits to take over the world. In the occasion, Shido also discovers the truth behind the origin of the spirits and his own existence. The season ran from April 10 to June 26, 2024. The opening theme song is "Paradoxes", performed by Miyu Tomita, while the ending theme song is "Hitohira", performed by sweet ARMS.

== Episodes ==
No. overall	No. in season	Title (Note: All English titles are taken from Crunchyroll.)	Directed by (Note: Information is taken from the ending credits of each episode.)	Written by	Storyboarded by	Original release date	Ref.
47	1	"Beginnings of War"; Transliteration: "Kaisen no Noroshi" (Japanese: 開戦の狼煙)	Jirō Arimoto	Fumihiko Shimo	Yasuto Nishikata	April 10, 2024	
Having temporarily trapped Phantom in a realm of shadows, Kurumi and her clone army prepare to go to war with DEM. At the same time, Westcott and his forces have become aware that Kurumi has been interfering with their plans to kill Shido, so they prepare to kill her and Shido at the same time. Meanwhile, Shido has already told everything he learned from Kurumi to the Spirits and Ratatoskr. Shido's allies agree that, regardless of what happens, they can't just hand over Shido's Spirit power since they have no idea whether Kurumi is capable of defeating the Spirit of Origin with it. Mukuro suggests using Michael to unlock Shido's memories of the Spirit of Origin, but he is unable to remember anything beyond a small vision of Phantom and the effort causes him to collapse. When he awakens, he and Kotori agree not to use Michael on Mana, as they fear that she will remember her past trauma when she was experimented on by DEM, the same way that happened to Nia. The next day, one of Kurumi's clone, acting independently from her master, informs Shido and Kotori that DEM plans a large scale attack on Ratatoskr. As a result, Kotori suggests they confront DEM directly, a plan that Woodman also agrees with, and Nia suggests that whatever they plan is kept secret, lest Westcott will learn about it through Beelzebub. Kurumi's independent clone returns to the original Kurumi, expecting to be executed for her disobedience, but the original Kurumi instead allows her to live, as she herself continues her preparations for war. Meanwhile, Origami and Mana go to the AST headquarters, where they tell Captain Kusakabe, Mikie and Mildred about the existence of Ratatoskr and ask them not to obey DEM's orders when the battle begins. Unfortunately, Kusakabe decides to follow her superiors, even if that means going against Origami, who asks her to stick to the rear during the fight and even reveals herself to be a Spirit.
48	2	"Final Respite"; Transliteration: "Saigo no Kyūsoku" (Japanese: 最後の休息)	Masahiko Watanabe	Fumihiko Shimo	Hiroshi Matsuzono	April 17, 2024	
The Spirits prepare snacks for Shido and each other as they prepare for the coming battle for DEM. As a form of mental preparation, they deliberately cook their meals with ingredients they explicitly dislike, thus they struggle to eat their own meals. Later that night, Tohka talks to Shido about his own feelings for Kurumi and he admits that he feels insecure about the way he's trying to save Kurumi. If they prevent her from confronting the Spirit of Origin, she might lose her only chance at saving her friends. Tohka gives Shido a lap pillow to comfort him, admitting that she feels guilty for all the dangers Shido had to face for the sake of the Spirits, and admits that she feels that perhaps it would have been better for them to have never met Shido at all if it meant sparing him from all those hardships. Shido, however, assures Tohka that he is glad to have met the Spirits and made them part of his life. The next day, Ratatoskr confronts DEM's fleet in the skies above Tengu City, with the population taking refuge in the underground shelters after getting warned about a spacequake. To increase their chances of victory, Kotori requests that the Spirits partake in the battle, while Origami and Mana deduce that DEM's Realizer have been programmed to sychronize with the brain activity of Artemisia Ashcroft, one of DEM's top Wizards, so if they capture her, they could find a way to shut them down. MARIA, Fraxinus' AI, also believes that Shido can neutralize Nibelcolle army, but for that, he will have to be on the front lines, a decision that Shido agrees with. DEM's flagship, with Westcott and Ellen onboard, deploys its contingent of Bandersnatch units against Fraxinus, only to be attacked by Kurumi's clones.
49	3	"The Spirit's Resurrection"; Transliteration: "Seirei no Fukkatsu" (Japanese: 精霊の復活)	Jun Nakagawa	Fumihiko Shimo	Takashi Sano	April 24, 2024	
As the battle progresses, the Spirits deploy into the battlefield, just as AST arrives and is told to by DEM to back up their forces. Yoshino and Mukuro protect Kusakabe and her squad are about to be hit by DEM's weapons, and Kusakabe realizes that DEM was planning to use them as cannon fodder. AST defects to Ratatoskr's side, pleasing Origami and Mana. Ellen and Artemisia enter the battle and Woodman wants to intercept them, even if it means putting his own life in danger. In an attempt to stop him, Karen, his assistant, admits she is in love with him and suggests that they should perhaps flee from the battle and start a family someplace else. Woodman politely turns her down and activates his personal Realizer unit, which reverse his age and turns him back into an adult, so he can fight Ellen evenly. Mukuro uses Michael on Artemisia and undoes her brainwashing. Tohka, Kaguya and Yuzuru distract the Nibelcolle army long enough for Shido to arrive at the battlefield and enact MARIA's plan to stop them. He starts showing affection to the Nibelcolles, such as blowing kisses at them and even outright kissing them. The Nibelcolles, overwhelmed with emotion, turn back into harmless pieces of paper. MARIA had theorized that, since they were created from Nia's emotions, they must behave exactly as a normal person would. Shido finally reunites with Kurumi, who still wants to absorb Shido's spirit power, so she can destroy the Spirit of Origin and prevent the creation of Spirits in the first place, but Shido doesn't want that to happen, because that would mean that Shido would have never met the Spirits at all, Kurumi included. He proposes that he confront the Spirit of Origin in Kurumi's place and rewrite history to ensure a happy future for everyone. Kurumi's independent clone sacrifices herself so that her master and Shido can vanquish all the Nibelcolles, but suddenly, Mio Takamiya, the Spirit of Origin, emerges from Kurumi's chest, severely injuring her in the process.
50	4	"The Spirit of Origin"; Transliteration: "Shigen no Seirei" (Japanese: 始原の精霊)	Shōgo Hanagami	Fumihiko Shimo	Ikuo Morimoto	May 1, 2024	
30 years ago, the Spirit of Origin appeared in Tenguu City and came across Shinji Takamiya, who took her to his home. There, he explained the situation to his sister Mana, who agreed to let the Spirit stay, and Shinji names her "Mio Takamiya". Mio had no memories of who she is or where she comes from, but she quickly learns how to communicate and the Takamiyas accept her as part of their family. Shinji and Mio spend a lot of time together and fall in love with each other. After winning a teddy bear in a crane game for Mio, Shinji works up the courage to ask her out on a date and Mio accepts even though she has no idea what a date is, so Mana calls her friend Haruko Homura (Kotori's future mother) for help in preparing Mio for her date. The date begins the next day, with Shinji taking Mio for a walk on the beach. In the afternoon, however, Shinji and Mio are pursued by Westcott's men, who are trying to capture Mio. A young Woodman, seeing that Mio is happy with Shinji, helps them escape, but Westcott reveals that he has captured Mana and he will only let her go if Mio comes with him. Mio is willing to go with Westcott, but Shinji refuses to believe Westcott and attempts to escape with Mio, but Westcott kills him with a gun. Horrified, Mio causes a spatial quake that devastates a small portion of the city, but Westcott escapes with a teleportation spell. She then absorbs Shinji's lifeless body into her own, promising to recreate him and never let him go.
51	5	"Mother Mio"; Transliteration: "Hahanaru Mio" (Japanese: 母なる零)	Jirō Arimoto	Fumihiko Shimo	Ippei Ichii	May 8, 2024	
Mio's plan to resurrect Shinji involved harboring the unborn Shinji within her womb and turning him into a Spirit, just like her. However, she knew that Shinji's human body wouldn't be able to handle that much power, so she set out in distributing her power across the women that would later become the Spirits, so that Shinji, who would later be reborn as Shido, absorb that power and be just like Mio. In the present, Kurumi dies from her injuries and Mio takes her Sephira and restores Shido's memories from his past life, confirming that Shinji and Shido are the same person. Onboard Fraxinus, Reine reveals herself to be just another part of Mio, sent to observe Shido's progress in collecting the Spirits' power. Mio and Reine combine into a single person, who wants Shido to join her in eternity together. Shido, however, is horrified upon witnessing the lengths Mio is willing to go through in service of her goal and Tohka, Kaguya and Yuzuru tries to defend him, but Mio teleports him to an underground shelter alongside the other students of Raizen High School to prevent him from getting hurt. Mio uses her Angel, Ain Soph Aur, to extend an enormous energy field that neutralizes the Nibelcolle army and incapacitates several combatants in both sides, including Mikie Okamine. Origami tells Kusakabe to take refuge within Fraxinus while the Spirits go on to help Shido. Meanwhile, Woodman attempts to reason with Ellen, who is still angry that Woodman betrayed her and Westcott and took her sister Karen with him. Woodman admits that he never wanted to hurt his friends' feelings, but upon watching the Spirit of Origin for the first time, he became incapable of using her in service of their goals, and Karen willingly chose to follow him. Despite their best efforts, Tohka, Kaguya and Yuzuru are unable to pierce through Mio's defensive barriers and Mio kills Kaguya and takes her divided Sephira, much to Yuzuru's horror. Shido explains to his schoolmates that Tohka and the Spirits are in trouble and must go to help them, and they agree to distract Professor Okamine while he leaves the shelter and returns to the battlefield, only to find Westcott already waiting for him and preparing to fight to see who is really worthy of obtaining the Spirits' power.
52	6	"The Three Magi"; Transliteration: "San'nin no Majutsu-shi" (Japanese: 三人の魔術師)	Shōgo Hanagami	Fumihiko Shimo	Kōichi Chigira, Kōji Iwai	May 15, 2024	
Long ago, Westcott, Woodman, Ellen and Karen lived together in a remote village populated by mages. Back when he was a child, Isaac's mother died but Isaac himself did not feel grief. Instead, he was pleased and thus realized he enjoyed other people's suffering and worked really hard to keep his dark feelings hidden. The village of mages was burned to the ground by people who feared the power of magic, so Isaac convinced his friends to join him into creating a world full of mages as the best way to avenge their community. Isaac's friends agreed, Ellen and Karen because they wanted to avenge their family and Elliot because he thought a society of mages would be the best way to protect themselves. The four mages took refuge in the city's orphanage, until Isaac was adopted by a wealthy couple three years later. Isaac's parents died in an accident, possibly arranged by Isaac himself, who would inherit their fortune and use it to fund his research into magic. With help from his fellow mages, Isaac developed a "Spirit Formula", a mystical equation that would create an entity composed of pure magic that would allow his/her creators to rewrite the world's natural laws and fulfill their dream of creating a world of mages. Their experiment to create such an entity caused the first spatial quake in history and gave birth to Mio Takamiya, the Spirit of Origin. Upon finishing his tale, Westcott confirms that he indeed killed Shinji Takamiya, Shido's previous incarnation, and hopes that by killing again, he will obtain enough power to challenge Mio. Disgusted by Westcott's cruelty, Shido prepares for a fight. Meanwhile, Woodman has already defeated Ellen but instead of killing her, he simply destroys her Realizer and knocks her unconscious. Unfortunately, Woodman's own Realizer has taken a severe toll on his lifespan and he dies on his knees, but not before gazing upon Mio's power one last time. Yuzuru, horrified by her sister's death, furiously attacks Mio but she quickly kills her and takes her divided Sephira. Origami, Yoshino, Mukuro and Mana arrive to support Tohka, but Mio activates Ain Soph, an angel which creates a pocket dimension space, covering a greater part of the city. She reveals that the Territory technology developed by DEM is but an imperfect copy of her own power and within this small dimension, she can dictate its laws and manipulate reality. She demonstrates that power by reversing and nullifying the Spirits and attacks and restoring Mana's memories of their previous life. Yoshino and Mukuro attempt to incapacitate Mio, but she easily kills them and takes their Sephira.
53	7	"The World Tree Sheds Leaves"; Transliteration: "Seikaiju wa Rakuyō shi" (Japanese: 世界樹は落葉し)	Norihiko Nagahama	Fumihiko Shimo	Kōji Iwai	May 22, 2024	
The remaining forces of AST take refuge on Fraxinus, where they are received by Kotori. In the occasion, they recognize Kannazuki as a former member and the most skilled pilot of AST, and are surprised that Kotori managed to keep him under control despite his antics. Meanwhile, Westcott uses Nibelcolle to subdue Shido, but he is rescued by Miku and Natsumi. Thanks to Beelzebub's omniscience, Westcott easily evades Shido's attacks, until Shido manages to defeat him by using an improvised attack to surprise him. The Fraxinus launches an attack on Mio's Territory, which Tohka and Origami use as a distraction to attack her directly but Mio kills them and takes their Sephira. Mio then proceeds to Fraxinus' bridge, doing the same to Nia. Kotori questions Mio, asking if their friendship during her time as Reine was a lie. Mio responds that she really considers Kotori her best friend, but is willing to sacrifice everything to revive Shinji, and thus kills her and claims her Sephira. Westcott asks for Shido to kill him but he refuses, until Mio appears and kills Westcott, Miku and Natsumi, taking their Sephira, as well. Having finally collected all the Sephira, Mio approaches Shido, affirming that the time has come for him to be reborn as Shinji so they can be together forever.
54	8	"The One Who Pulled the Trigger"; Transliteration: "Hikigane ni Yubi o Kaketa no wa" (Japanese: 引き金に指を掛けたのは)	Jirō Arimoto	Fumihiko Shimo	Yasuto Nishikata	May 29, 2024	
After her apparent death at Mio's hands, Tohka has been teleported to a void, with only her Inverted self to keep her company. Inverted Tohka tells her regular self that they are within Mio and that's something that could only happen to them because they, unlike the other Spirits, were not formerly human. Instead, they were unintentionally born when their Sephira gained a will of its own. Inverted Tohka says there is still a way for Tohka to return to the realm of the living and help Shido, but such help will be brief and Mio will definitely kill them again, but Tohka doesn't care as long as she can give Shido one last chance to save everyone, so Inverted Tohka agrees to help her return. Shido, trapped in Mio's dimension, loses the will to fight upon learning that all the Spirits are dead and almost lets Mio erase his memories in her efforts to resurrect Shinji, but Tohka returns to the battlefield and inspires Shido to keep fighting. Together, Shido and Tohka draw blood from Mio, who is forced to activate her third Angel, Ain, to completely erase Tohka. This time, however, Shido refuses to lose hope and continues fighting until Kurumi's last surviving clone arrives to assist him. She reveals that, before her death, the original Kurumi sent her to the future. Unfortunately, even this last Kurumi clone falls before Mio, but her sacrifice causes Shido to understand Kurumi's plan. She always knew she wouldn't beat Mio all by herself, so she sent her clone to help Shido figure out that he is in possession of Zafkiel's Sixth Bullet, which he uses to travel back in time to the night before the battle with DEM begins. Relieved to the point of tears at seeing Tohka alive again, Shido embraces her. After being encouraged by Tohka, Shido realizes what he has to do to save everyone and change the future, and so asks Reine out on a date.
55	9	"A "Second" Date"; Transliteration: ""Futatabime" no Dēto" (Japanese: 『二度目』のデート)	Masahiko Watanabe	Fumihiko Shimo	Tetsuhito Saitō	June 5, 2024	
After successfully convincing Reine to have a date with him, Shido tells Kotori the whole truth and she agrees to help with his plan. Origami, who eavesdroped on them, informs the other Spirits about the situation, all of them agreeing to help as well. Shido also tells Kurumi's independent clone that Mio must be already inside the original Kurumi and asks her to inform Kurumi in a way that Mio doesn't notice. The next day, Shido begins his date with Reine, assisted by the Spirits and the crew of Fraxinus, but using a different device on his collarbone to prevent Reine from suspecting him. He takes her to a hotel where they relax in a bath together, with Shido inquiring Reine about her past and Reine asking Shido about his memories before being taken in by the Itsuka family. Shido reveals that he has almost no memories of his mother but is sure that she left him behind for a good reason and that she loved him, making her happy. Meanwhile, Westcott learns about what happened in the future from Beelzebub and decides to begin DEM's battle with Ratatoskr ahead of schedule, this time taking extra measures to deal not only with Shido and his friends, but with Mio as well. Shido continues his date with Reine by taking her to the same beach Mio and Shinji went during their date decades ago, much to Reine's joy.
56	10	"A Battlefield That Should Be Impossible"; Transliteration: "Arienai Hazu no Senjō" (Japanese: あり得ないはずの戦場)	Shōgo Hanagami	Fumihiko Shimo	Hiroshi Matsuzono	June 12, 2024	
Shido brings Reine's affections to the maximum and kisses her, but fails to seal her power, with Reine tapping into his memories instead and learning about what happened in the future. Kurumi appears and confronts Reine, when Mio's other half emerges from Kurumi's body. However, before dying, Kurumi uses Zafkiel, preventing the reformed Mio from reclaiming her Sephira. Shido is rescued and brought aboard the Fraxinus while DEM's fleet attacks Mio. With Mio occupied fighting back, Westcott sends some Bandersnatch to invade Shido's school and the AST headquarters, taking them hostage and demanding Shido and Kotori to surrender, but Mukuro uses her teleportation to send the other spirits to rescue their friends instead. Ellen takes the opportunity to invade the Fraxinus and attacks Shido and Kotori. Mana appears to protect them and the three join forces against Westcott, Ellen, Artemisia and the Nibelcolle, but are overpowered by their enemies until Kurumi's clones appear before them.
57	11	"A Fleeting Paradise"; Transliteration: "Kari Hajime no Rakuen" (Japanese: 仮初めの楽園)	Jun Nakagawa	Fumihiko Shimo	Takashi Sano	June 19, 2024	
While Kurumi's clones defeat the Nibelcolle, Kurumi attacks Wescott, extracts Beelzebub from him, reforms it into Raziel and absorbs it. While Ellen and Artemisia escape with the injured Westcott, Kurumi reveals to Shido that the Kurumi before him is another clone to whom the original one transferred her memories and Sephira, before she is killed by Mio. Mio appears before Shido and the Spirits and Shido confronts her, affirming that even if she erases his memories and replaces them with Shinji's, she will never be able to fully resurrect Shinji. Mio attacks the group and Shido decides to attempt to seal Mio once more, as they know Shido won't be able to reset the timeline with Zafkiel again and Kurumi agrees with his plan by kissing him and transferring the power of Zafkiel and Raziel to his body. Having finally obtained the power of all 10 Spirits, Shido approaches Mio and kisses her. Both are encased into a sphere of light where Shido awakens in a beach created from Mio's memories where he meets Reine, Mio and Shinji. As the four spend their time inside the closed space, Shido realizes that Mio's real intentions were not to create him as a replacement for Shinji, but to make him strong enough so he can kill her instead. Meanwhile, outside the sphere, Westcott approaches the Spirits and begins a ritual to transform himself into a new Spirit of Origin.
58	12	"And Her Choice Is"; Transliteration: "Soshite Kanojo ga Erabu no wa" (Japanese: そして彼女が選ぶのは)	Jirō Arimoto	Fumihiko Shimo	Yasuto Nishikata, Jun Nakagawa	June 26, 2024	
Mio decides to let Shido kill her, but Shido objects, deciding to seal her instead so she can live with him and the other Spirits. However, Westcott completes the ritual transforming himself into a Spirit of Origin. Upon saying their farewells to Shinji and Reine, Shido and Mio join forces to fight Westcott. Westcott uses his Demon Kings Belial and Athiel, evil counterparts of Ain Soph and Ain Soph Aur respectively, to try and stop Shido, but Mio grants each of the Spirits access to their full power. Banding together with the other Spirits, Mio and Shido helps to wear down Westcott, aided by MARIA, whom has gained a physical body thanks to Nia's Angel Raziel, as a counterpart to the Nibelcoles. Using each of their Angels to launch a full scale attack on Westcott, they manage to wear down his body to the point of losing control of his powers. Mio declares she loves Shido, though not to the same extent as Shinji, and then sacrifices herself to stop Westcott, reuniting with Shinji in the afterlife. Mortally wounded, Westcott has one last meeting with Ellen, Elliot and Karen before dying, while Shido and the Spirits mourn Mio's death. Sometime later, everyone goes back to their normal lives, while Shido and Tohka go out on a date together.
