= Date A Live season 4 =

2021 Japanese anime series

Date a Live IV
- Season 4
- Fourth season anime key visual
- No. of episodes: 12

Release
- Original network: AT-X
- Original release: April 8 – June 24, 2022

Season chronology
- ← Previous; Date A Live III Next → Date A Live V

The fourth season of the Date A Live anime series, titled Date A Live IV, was produced by Geek Toys and directed by Jun Nakagawa, adapting volumes 13 to 16 of the light novel series of the same name. Like the rest of the series, it follows the adventures of Shido Itsuka and the Spirits, supernatural female entities that have fallen in love with him. The season was scheduled to premiere in October 2021, but was delayed to April 2022 for "various reasons". Fumihiko Shimo wrote the fourth season's scripts, with Naoto Nakamura designing the characters and Go Sakabe returning to compose the series' music. It aired from April 8 to June 24, 2022. The opening theme is titled "OveR" performed by Miyu Tomita, and the ending theme is titled "S.O.S" performed by sweet ARMS. On April 21, 2022, Crunchyroll announced that the season would receive an English dub, which premiered the following day.

== Episodes ==
No. overall	No. in season	Title (Note: All English titles are taken from Crunchyroll.)	Directed by (Note: Information is taken from the ending credits of each episode.)	Written by	Storyboarded by	Original release date	Ref.
35	1	"Don't Panic. This is a Spirit Trap"; Transliteration: "Awateru na. Kore wa Seirei no Wana da" (Japanese: あわてるな。これは精霊の罠だ)	Norihiko Nagahama	Fumihiko Shimo	Ikuo Morimoto	April 8, 2022	
Kurumi Tokisaki attacks a D.E.M. facility and finds the captured Spirit Nia Honjou, codenamed "Sister." Sometime after the most recent events, Shido has been receiving medical checkups from Reine to confirm his health after having to seal the Spirits' magical energy in his body for an extended period of time. While Mana Takamiya gets her own checkup from Kotori, Shido returns home when he runs into Nia starving on the streets. He brings her to her workplace, a manga publishing bullpen, where Nia reveals herself both as a Spirit and as a manga artist. She is already aware of Shido's mission thanks to her Angel, Raziel, which gives her almost unlimited knowledge on the world and humanity. For her own amusement, Nia decides to go on a date with Shido, until she reveals that she has never fallen in love with anything other than characters from fiction.
36	2	"So Be It! 2D It Is!"; Transliteration: "Yoroshii, Naraba Nijigen da" (Japanese: よろしい、ならば二次元だ)	Yukio Kuroda	Fumihiko Shimo	Kenichi Yatagai	April 15, 2022	
Shido's attempts to win Nia's heart, both by acting like her favorite manga character and communicating with her through a video game demo, fail, which gives Ratatoskr the idea of entering a manga festival and submitting their own amateur manga. If they win, Nia will be forced to read it. While the Spirits work hard at creating the manga, Shido and Kotori visit an old friend of Nia, whom Nia stopped getting into contact, leading her to believe Nia did not like her anymore. This causes Kotori to believe that Raziel made Nia aware of people's hidden dark thoughts, though, Shido believes Nia wouldn't do that and can overcome this problem with the help of the Spirits. Meanwhile, Kurumi visits Nia and asks her if there is a way to destroy the Spirit of Origin, the Spirit responsible for the creation of all Spirits. Nia tells her that the Spirit of Origin is so powerful that defeating her in straight-up combat is impossible, but Kurumi believes she can get around that with time travel. Natsumi does the lion's share of the manga's work and passes out from exhaustion but the Spirits complete their preparations for the festival.
37	3	"What's Yours Is Mine"; Transliteration: "Kimi no Mono wa Watashi no Mono" (Japanese: 君のものは私のもの)	Seung Deok Kim; Taiki Nishimura	Fumihiko Shimo	Ikuo Morimoto	April 22, 2022	
The Comico festival begins with the Spirits and Nia setting up their own booths in order to sell their manga. The Spirits ask their friends and colleagues for help in their sales, while Nia gets a surprise visit from her old friend, Takajo, who despite not understanding why Nia stopped being friends with her, still wants to support her work. As the competition heats up, Nia admits that she feels unable to trust people on a personal level because Raziel constantly tempts her to look into people's secrets and violate their privacy, but Shido says that, no matter what happens, he will always trust her. As the festival ends, the competition ends in a draw, but Nia agrees to read the Spirits' manga, an embellished retelling of how Shido saved them, which touches her emotionally. Suddenly, Nia starts to inverse, due to the memories and trauma of being captured and tortured by D.E.M., purposefully re-triggered by Isaac Westcott. With Raziel turned into the Demon King Beelzebub, the Spirits attempt to calm Nia down, until Ellen and Westcott's new Wizard, Artemisia Bell Ashcroft, steal Nia's Qlipha crystal, the source of her power as an Inverted Spirit. Westcott himself assimilates the Qlipha crystal and obtains the power of Beelzebub, ordering a retreat so he can fully assimilate to its power. Fortunately, a fragment of Nia's Sephira crystal still remains within her body, so Shido is able to seal her powers. On the path to recovery, Nia plans to reconnect with Takajo and reveals to the other Spirits that Spirits are all actually former human beings, even the supposed "pure ones".
38	4	"Space Spirit"; Transliteration: "Sora no Seirei" (Japanese: 宙(そら)の精霊)	Kōichirō Kuroda; Ryūta Imaizumi	Fumihiko Shimo	Kōji Hōri	April 29, 2022	
An asteroid falls right into Shido's school in the middle of class and Ratatoskr reveals this to be caused by a space-bound Spirit fending off attacks by DEM forces. Using a camera to project himself into outer space, Shido attempts to talk to the Spirit, Mukuro Hoshimiya. Mukuro's Angel, Michael, can move objects across long distances, as well as lock and unlock physical skills and memories of objects and people. Mukuro used Michael on herself to seal her emotions, becoming a person of cold, dispassionate logic. Shido's attempts to persuade her to come to Earth with him fail, as she believes that the Spirits' reduced power will not protect them from anyone who would wish harm on them, like DEM. She also threatens to stop the Earth's rotation should anyone interrupt her solitude again, Shido included. Between the threat of DEM successfully capturing Mukuro, and Earth's destruction, Kotori tells Shido Ratatoskr will travel into space with its new spaceship, the Fraxinus Excelsior, in order to save Mukuro. Before liftoff, however, the Spirits receive a visit from Elliot Baldwin Woodman, chairman and founder of Ratatoskr. He reveals that he, alongside Westcott, Ellen, and her sister Karen, founded DEM in an attempt to capture Spirits, but upon realizing the immorality of their actions and falling in love with the Spirit of Origin, Woodman parted ways with Westcott and founded Ratatoskr alongside Karen. As soon as Woodman thanks Shido for keeping the Spirits safe, Westcott finds the Spirits through the power of Beelzebub, trapping them in a dark void while he goes to confront Woodman.
39	5	"Fairy Tale"; Transliteration: "Fearī Teiru" (Japanese: フェアリー・テイル)	Masahiko Watanabe	Fumihiko Shimo	Ikuo Morimoto	May 6, 2022	
Using the power of Beelzebub, Westcott has trapped the Spirits in a world with elements of classical fairy tales and modern manga, forcing the Spirits to play the parts of fictional characters. Shido manages to reunite with the Spirits, who realize they are unable to escape from the fantasy world under their own power. Instead, the Spirits must find a character powerful enough to help them return to the real world. Fortunately, an alternate version of Shido, the protagonist of the manga created by the Spirits for Comico, comes to their aid and helps them return to their world, but not before telling his original self to save Mukuro and help her come to terms with her own emotions. As the Spirits return to the real world, the Fraxinus' crew has successfully repelled an attack from DEM's forces and the Fraxinus finally blasts off into space.
40	6	"An Opened Heart"; Transliteration: "Hirakareta Kokoro" (Japanese: 開かれた心)	Shunji Yoshida	Fumihiko Shimo	Tetsuhito Saitō	May 13, 2022	
Woodman faces off against Westcott while the Fraxinus catches up to Mukuro in space. Thanks to the Fraxinus' improved and expanded Territory, Shido and the Spirits can perform a spacewalk without the need of spacesuits in order to talk to Mukuro directly. Unfortunately, the DEM fleet, led by Ellen, attacks Fraxinus while Shido uses Haniel to create his own copy of Michael, hoping to use it to unlock the emotions Mukuro sealed away. MARIA, Fraxinus' AI, grants Origami the Brunhild combat armor so she can fight Artemisia, who is present in the fight, as well. Origami proceeds to merge Brunhild with her own Spirit power, just as the Spirits grant a portion of their power to Fraxinus in order to deal severe damage to Goetia, Ellen's personal warship, and force it into a retreat. Shido successfully unlocks Mukuro's emotions but they are attacked by DEM's remaining ships, forcing Shido to protect Mukuro with his own body during atmospheric re-entry. Fraxinus recovers Shido, but Mukuro is nowhere to be found, until she teleports at Fraxinus' medical bay and, with her emotions unlocked, happily agrees to go on a date with Shido. Meanwhile, Ellen returns to Westcott's side, finding him injured after his fight with Woodman.
41	7	"Locked Memories"; Transliteration: "Tojirareta Kioku" (Japanese: 閉じられた記憶)	Taiki Nishimura; Jirō Arimoto	Fumihiko Shimo	Kenichi Yatagai	May 20, 2022	
Shido's date with Mukuro proceeds without problems, but when Mukuro says that she wants to keep Shido all to herself, Shido reaffirms that his duty is to save all the Spirits, not just Mukuro. The next day, Shido awakens to realize that everyone he has ever met, including the Spirits, has no idea of who he is. Mukuro reveals herself to be responsible for erasing people's memories of Shido because she wants Shido to belong to her. Unexpectedly, however, 2 people still remember Shido: the new Origami, born after Shido created a new timeline, and Tohka's Inverted personality, awakened during the battle at DEM Industries. Inverted Tohka wants revenge on Shido for supposedly humiliating her during their first encounter and is about to fight Mukuro, but Origami, acting as peacemaker, decides that the best way to end this conflict is with a date. Unfortunately, the attempts of both Inverted Tohka and Mukuro to seduce Shido only make him uncomfortable.
42	8	"Key and Sword"; Transliteration: "Kagi to Ken" (Japanese: 鍵と剣)	Jirō Arimoto	Fumihiko Shimo	Ippei Ichii	May 27, 2022	
Kotori and the Ratatoskr crew, having not yet fully regained their memories yet, monitor Shido's date with both Inverted Tohka and Mukuro and send the Spirits to find them. Origami suggests they visit the Tengu Tower, a place Mukuro once visited with her foster family. This causes Mukuro to feel momentarily sick and Inverted Tohka uses this as an opportunity to attempt to kiss Shido, which enrages Mukuro and triggers a battle between them. During the battle, Inverted Tohka cuts a lock from Mukuro's hair, which further enrages Mukuro and causes her to use Michael in an attempt to stop the planet's rotation, thinking that she and Shido live forever in space. Origami once again combines the Brunhild armor and her Spirit powers to fight Inverted Tohka while Shido convinces the Spirits to save the planet. Mukuro suddenly remembers that, when she first obtained her Spirit powers, she used them to make everyone forget her foster sister Asahi existed, including her friends and teacher, an act that caused her family to fear and reject Mukuro. Horrified by what she has done, Mukuro almost Inverts but Shido comforts her and says that he will be her new family. Shido seals her powers, the Spirits are able to save the planet, and Inverted Tohka allows Shido to kiss her, with regular Tohka returning, as she and everyone else recovers their memories of Shido. A few days later, Shido and the Spirits return to Raizen, only to find Kurumi waiting for them.
43	9	"Nightmare's Seduction"; Transliteration: "Muma no Yūwaku" (Japanese: 夢魔の誘惑)	Yukio Kuroda	Fumihiko Shimo	Takashi Sano	June 3, 2022	
Kurumi has decided to give Shido a chance to seal her own powers, if he can make her fall in love with him first; if she makes him fall for her first, she will take his powers, which would kill him. Shido agrees because he wants Kurumi to have a normal, happy life, despite the problems she has given him in the past. Meanwhile, Westcott orders Ellen and Artemisia to kill Shido, even creating an army of artificial Spirits called Nibelcolle, to help them. As soon as DEM is about to attack Shido, however, they are intercepted by Mana, who reluctantly receives help from Kurumi's clones and succeeds in forcing DEM to retreat. As the Spirits talk about Kurumi's reappearance and DEM's attack, Nia reveals that Kurumi had visited her before the Comico festival and asked for information on how to kill the Spirit of Origin, who appeared 30 years ago. The next day, Shido and Kurumi begin their date, in which Shido takes Kurumi to play with some cats.
44	10	"Girl Time"; Transliteration: "Otome no Jikan" (Japanese: 乙女の時間)	Masahiko Watanabe	Fumihiko Shimo	Ken'ichi Imaizumi	June 10, 2022	
Shido and Kurumi share their lunches with one another at Raizen, while the other Spirits prepare for the upcoming Valentine's Day. That night, Shido is unexpectedly attacked by the Nibelcolle clones in his house, but awakens to find himself like nothing happened. After the Spirits initial attempts to seduce Shido, they proceed to make chocolates, though most are inexperienced and rely on Reine's help. During their conversations, Reine talks about the story of her first love from long ago. Kurumi then arrives in the household, intending to make her own chocolates, as the Spirits reluctantly agree to let her join them in making them.
45	11	"Past Sins"; Transliteration: "Kajitsu no Zaigō" (Japanese: 過日の罪業)	Yūsuke Onoda	Fumihiko Shimo	Hiroyuki Kōbe	June 17, 2022	
Valentine's Day arrives and the Spirits give their chocolate gifts to Shido, who goes on another date with Kurumi. Upon nightfall, Kurumi decides to tell her full story to Shido and takes him to an abandoned building she has been using as a safehouse, where she uses her Angel to transfer her memories to Shido. Years ago, Kurumi was just a normal person who suddenly stumbled upon Mio Takamiya, the Spirit of Origin. Mio acknowledges that Kurumi had the ability to enter the realm of the Spirits, so she gave her a Sephira crystal, turning Kurumi into a Spirit herself, and tasked her with hunting monsters across the city. Kurumi killed the monsters as Mio had told her to, but she later discovered that one of the monsters she killed was her friend, Sawa, who had received a Sephira crystal from Mio, revealing that all the monsters she had been hunting were actually humans mutated by the unstable powers of the Sephirah crystals. All this time, Mio had been using humans in an attempt to refine Sephira crystals so that she could bond them to humans that could properly use their powers, like Kurumi herself. Upon watching the end of Kurumi's memories, Shido finally understands Kurumi's mission: she wants to avenge Sawa's death.
46	12	"Cycle of Salvation"; Transliteration: "Kyūsai no Rinne" (Japanese: 救済の輪廻)	Shōgo Hanagami	Fumihiko Shimo	Ikuo Morimoto	June 24, 2022	
Kurumi admits to Shido that she feels she doesn't deserve redemption for what she has done in her quest to kill the Spirit of Origin, but she promises that her actions will be undone if her plans succeed, intending to use Shido's power to let her travel back in time to before Mio made her a Spirit and kill her then. She strips and offers her body to Shido to convince him to relinquish his powers and life to her, but a group of Nibelcolle clones attack them. Kurumi kills the Nibelcolles but collapses from exhaustion. A duplicate of Kurumi from an alternate timeline reaches the safehouse and admits to Shido that Kurumi has been using time travel to protect Shido from DEM's constant attacks, as DEM has already succeeded in killing him 204 times, with her undoing it each time. When Shido asks why Kurumi simply didn't kill him and take his powers for herself instead of going through all that trouble just to save him, Kurumi admits that she has fallen in love with him. Once the original Kurumi awakens from her rest, she and her clones reevaluate their plans until they stumble upon Phantom, the mysterious entity that has been creating Spirits throughout the years. The Kurumis attack and successfully expose Phantom, revealing herself to be Reine, before taking her into their realm. Shido returns to Ratatoskr's headquarters and informs the Spirits about Kurumi's actions, and his intentions to save her, all the while another Reine is there assisting them.
