= Date A Live season 3 =

2019 Japanese anime series

Date A Live III
- Season 3
- Third season anime key visual
- No. of episodes: 12

Release
- Original network: AT-X, Tokyo MX, KBS Kyoto
- Original release: January 11 – March 29, 2019

Season chronology
- ← Previous; Date A Live II Next → Date A Live IV

The third season of the Date A Live anime series, titled Date A Live III, was produced by J.C.Staff and directed by Keitaro Motonaga. Like the rest of the series, it follows the adventures of Shido Itsuka and the Spirits, supernatural female entities that have fallen in love with him. This season adapts volumes 8 to 12 of the light novels by Kōshi Tachibana and Tsunako. Date A Live III ran from January 11 to March 29, 2019, on Tokyo MX in Japan. The opening theme is titled "I Swear" performed by sweet ARMS, and the ending theme is "Last Promise" performed by Eri Yamazaki. Crunchyroll simulcast the third season, while Funimation produced a simuldub. In Australia and New Zealand, AnimeLab simulcast the third season.

== Episodes ==
| No. overall | No. in season | Title (Note: All English titles are taken from Funimation.) | Original release date | Ref. |
|---|---|---|---|---|
| 23 | 1 | "The Seventh Spirit"; Transliteration: "Nana ban-me no Seirei" (Japanese: 七番目の精霊) | January 11, 2019 | |
After having a hot pot party with the Spirits, Shido and the crew of the Fraxinus depart to meet a new Spirit who appeared. Introducing herself as Natsumi, aka Witch appears to be friendly to Shido at first, until the AST attacks, she suddenly changes her behavior and without further explanation, declares that she will destroy Shido's life before making her leave. Back at school, Shido is surprised when his classmates and teacher accuse him of committing multiple offences against them, until he learns that the true culprit is Natsumi, who disguised as him to destroy his reputation, but before Natsumi attacks Shido, Tohka and Origami intervene and easily distinguish the true Shido from the false, forcing her to retreat. Some days later, Kotori approaches Shido with a letter from Natsumi containing pictures of twelve people close to him. According to the letter, Natsumi disguised herself as one of them, and is challenging Shido to identify the impostor before all of them are disappeared.
| 24 | 2 | "Can You Find Me?"; Transliteration: "Watashi o mitsukerareru?" (Japanese: 私を見つけられる?) | January 18, 2019 | |
To find out who among his friends was replaced by Natsumi, Shido starts having dates with each of them. After meeting Tohka, Yoshino, Hiroto and Yuzuru, Shido decides that none of them could be Natsumi in disguise. However at midnight, Natsumi uses her power to make Yuzuru disappear. Kaguya is distraught over her disappearance but they lie to her that Yuzuru is away undergoing some test. Shido realizes he has to move fast in order to expose Natsumi before more disappearances occur.
| 25 | 3 | "You're Natsumi"; Transliteration: "Natsumi wa omae da" (Japanese: 七罪はおまえだ) | January 25, 2019 | |
Shido goes on a date with Kotori, Kaguya, Miku, Ai, Mai, Mii, Tamae and Origami but is still unable to determine who Natsumi is disguising as. As a result, Natsumi causes more people to disappear and only Kotori, Kaguya, Miku and Origami are left. The four remaining girls and Shido gather together to brainstorm on the identity of Natsumi. Natsumi appears and informs them that they only have three guesses left. During the brainstorming, they discuss the possibility that Natsumi might actually be one of those that have already disappeared. Origami also comments that Natsumi might not actually be a person literally. She stabs a knife through the photos to ensure that Natsumi is not hiding herself as a photo. The group guess wrongly twice and both Kaguya and Origami are sucked up by <Haniel> as a result. Miku loses hope and passes her hair ornament to Shido and comments that she doesn't want the hairpin to disappear together with her and wants something for Shido to remember her by. Triggered by Miku's comments on "things disappearing together", as well as the earlier discussion, Shido realizes that Yoshinon the puppet was able to catch his hand-phone despite Yoshino not being able to see it. Thus Shido is able to guess that Natsumi is disguising herself as Yoshinon the puppet. Natsumi is shocked that she has lost and momentarily loses control of <Haniel>. All the missing people reappears and Natsumi's true form of a little girl is revealed. Natsumi, angry that her true appearance has been seen again, transforms the Spirits into child version of themselves including Origami who's involved as well.
| 26 | 4 | "Transformation"; Transliteration: "Henshin" (Japanese: 変身) | February 1, 2019 | |
Shido has his hands full dealing with the Spirits in child form, much to Natsumi's joy, as she is determined to make him suffer using magic to changes the house and clothes. Meanwhile, the top executives of DEM Industries are eager to get their revenge on Westcott and make plans to kill him no matter the cost. When Natsumi is attacked by a DEM platoon led by Ellen, Shido and the other Spirits appear to rescue her. Weakened from the battle, Natsumi becomes unable to summon her angel and is confined by Kotori. Shido then confronts Natsumi and learns that she loathes him because he saw her true form as a child, and that she believes he would never care about her because of that. Meanwhile, Origami is being hunted down by her former employees until she accepts working for DEM in exchange for information about a fire that happened five years ago. To cheer Natsumi up, Shido and the Spirits take her to a full course of activities involving relaxing, buying clothes and make up, to show her that she can become pretty even as a child, but she flees as it becomes too much to deal with.
| 27 | 5 | "Despair Comes Crashing Down"; Transliteration: "Zetubō ga ochitekuru" (Japanese: 絶望が落ちてくる) | February 8, 2019 | |
To confirm what the others truly think of her, Natsumi disguises as Kotori and talks to them, but they turn against her, with Shido being clueless around Kotori. Meanwhile, the executives of DEM diverge a satellite to crash at the city in an attempt to kill Westcott. While the citizens evacuate to the shelter, Shido is determined to look for Natsumi in the city, who is missing. Kotori uses Fraxinus trump card, an immensely powerful cannon amplified by her Spirit power to destroy the satellite. However a second satellite appears and with Kotori too weak to use the cannon again, all hope seems lost. Shido tries to use his weapon but it failed. Tohka, Yoshino, Yuzuru and Kaguya came to help with Tohka warning about the magic shield. At the last moment, Natsumi reveals herself and helps Shido and the other Spirits destroy it. Having finally accepted Shido and the others as friends, Natsumi allows herself to be sealed by him. Suddenly, a third satellite bomb is dropped on the city, just to be later destroyed with ease by Origami wearing a DEM combat suit, much to Shido's surprise.
| 28 | 6 | "Crossroads"; Transliteration: "Wakatareta michi" (Japanese: 分かたれた道) | February 15, 2019 | |
Shido learns that Origami left the school and looks for her at her apartment, where she captures him. While Kotori starts looking for him, Origami tells Shido that despite knowing that the Spirits are not a threat once sealed, she must uphold the promise she made to wipe them all out in revenge for her parents' death. She then leaves to fight Tohka and the others while the Fraxinus is intercepted by Ellen, piloting one of DEM's ships. Despite the enemy ship being better equipped, Kotori refuses to surrender, and both ships fight, while a restrained Shido is calling out for help.
| 29 | 7 | "The Power Given"; Transliteration: "Motarasareta chikara" (Japanese: もたらされた力) | February 22, 2019 | |
As Origami fights against the other Spirits, Natsumi and Yoshino rescue Shido. The Fraxinus continues to battle against Ellen and her ship while Tohka struggles to protect the others from Origami's attacks, until she manages to regain her lost power and fatally wounds her. Having lost the battle Origami accepts Phantom's offer of more power and transforms into a Spirit herself equipped with <Metatron>, vowing to kill all Spirits before committing suicide to ensure that no one else can be harmed by them anymore. When she resumes the fight against Tohka, Shido appears to stands in her way, leading her to retreat. Later, as the other Spirits are recuperating and Shido prepares to seal Tohka again, Origami appears before Kurumi.
| 30 | 8 | "Demon King of Descending Darkness"; Transliteration: "Yami furu yoru no maō" (Japanese: 闇降る夜の魔王) | March 1, 2019 | |
Origami makes a deal with Kurumi to send Origami to the past to prevent her parents' death using her untested Twelfth Bullet: Yud Bet. Once there, she confronts Phantom and attempts to kill her, just to later discover that it was one of her own attacks that killed her parents, and the Spirit that was the source of her revenge was none other than herself, much to her despair. Returning to the present, fallen into her Inverse form <Devil>, an emotionless Origami attacks the entire city including the hospital where Shido and the other Spirits were recuperating. Despite the Spirits and Fraxinus' backup, Shido finds his voice can no longer reach Inverse Origami as she is now dead to the world. Kurumi realizes that the current Origami can no longer be saved and thus sends Shido five years earlier hoping that he could change the past.
| 31 | 9 | "Tengu City, Five Years Ago"; Transliteration: "Gonenmae, Tengū-shi" (Japanese: 五年前、天宮市) | March 8, 2019 | |
Kurumi, syncing with Shido in the past, directs him to the spot where Kotori received her Spirit powers from Phantom. Using Natsumi's magic to disguise as his 10-year-old self, Shido witnessed the events that took place when future Origami arrives and attacks. He realizes that Origami's parents were unintentionally killed by future Origami herself, thus causing her to go Inverse. Shido saves and comforts past Origami. He asks past Origami to carry all her emotions to him as the only emotion she will now carry is anger and vows to avenge her parents. This explains why she remembers him in the beginning of season 1. Not giving up, Kurumi leads Shido to meet her past self (eye-patch Kurumi) with the method to alter history. Eye-patch Kurumi is initially skeptical but after communicating with the Kurumi in the present, they reach an agreement. Eye-patch Kurumi sends Shido back in time a few hours, thus giving him a second chance to change history. Shido hides to allow Phantom to give Kotori the power first. Then Shido attempts to persuade Phantom to leave such that the fight with future Origami could be avoided. Phantom mysteriously instantly knows who Shido is and that he came from the future with Kurumi's help. She transforms into a pink-haired girl and refuses to leave as she said she had some tasks to achieve. Future Origami appears and the fight happens again. Just when history seemed doomed to repeat itself, Shido runs to where past Origami is and pushes Origami's parents out of the way and takes the hit instead. He then awakens in his bedroom, unsure if history has been changed.
| 32 | 10 | "Another World, Another Girl"; Transliteration: "Mōhitotsu no sekai, mōhitori no kanojo" (Japanese: もうひとつの世界、もうひとりの彼女) | March 15, 2019 | |
Shido finds the world is different but nobody really remembers Origami. The girls notice that something is troubling Shido, but only Shido notices the change in the timeline. Natsumi proposes that Kotori and Yoshino cheer Shido up in embarrassing maid outfits. Shido then discovers what's different in this new timeline when Kotori mentions an unidentified Spirit called "Devil," and in footage, Shido recognizes her to be Origami. The next day, Origami reappears as a new transfer student in Shido's class, who has had a complete change of personality. Shido calls Kotori for information, and learns Origami was a still a member of the AST until she retired for unknown reasons. At lunch break, Shido talks with Origami and summarizes that her associating with the AST were not so dramatic, Origami believes the guy who saved her parents and "died" could have been Shido's brother, and her parents gave her so much happiness but ironically still died due to a car accident four years ago. Shido feels tired and sleeps on the rooftop. Kurumi later wakes him up and reveals she remembers everything from the old timeline. When Origami discovers the both of them together, she suddenly transforms into her Inverse Spirit form and attacks. She goes back to normal after Kurumi retreats, but does not recall what just happened.
| 33 | 11 | "Angel of the Starry Night"; Transliteration: "Hoshi furu yoru no Tenshi" (Japanese: 星降る夜の天使) | March 22, 2019 | |
Shido illuminates how he and Kurumi are the only ones who retain knowledge of the previous timeline. Reine analyzed footage from Origami's Inverse form and theorizes that despite the alteration of space-time continuum Origami possesses both personas of her current and old self, which the latter acts as a self-defense mechanism whenever she comes across a Spirit. He'd already prescheduled the usual plan to have Origami fall for Shido and seal her powers. The two developed genuine moods on their date, although Shido refuses to oblige to Ratatoskr's three-way choice, wanting to advance Origami's previous aspects that catches her attention. Later, when Shido rescued Origami from falling off the cliff edge, she notice Efreet's flame healing Shido's wound, and transforms into Devil. Tohka and the Spirit Team sense the dreadful danger and intercept the Devil's Satan with Fraxinus shoot down. Within Origami's subconscious she comes into conflict with her old self, Shido breaks through and grabs her hand. Even though Origami didn't have real affections for Shido before, he tells her since five years ago, that she no longer has to carry her burdens alone and he kisses her, reverting Origami to her true Astral Dress. Kotori and the Fraxinus crew have survived. Shido is at school while Origami and Tohka resume to what they usually do in the old timeline with a change: fight for Shido's affection while smiling at the end with her long hair cut back down to short hair again.
| 34 | 12 | "Make Shido Itsuka Swoon"; Transliteration: "Itsuka Shidō o kōryaku seyo" (Japanese: 五河士道を攻略せよ) | March 29, 2019 | |
Shido is exhibiting unusual strength and speed. After careful analysis, Reine asserts that the link between Shido and all Spirits he has imprinted are merging into an unstable circulation causing overheat his body with absurd powers. To deal with this problem, the Spirits have to kiss Shido to make the link flow inside him secure before midnight. But before they could, Shido destroy and walks out of the infirmary. Shido ignites Yoshino and Miku's powers on the towns people (includes kissing Ellen) for his amusement. Everyone catches up to him and Shido declares that he will only cooperate if they can make him fall for them. A competition is held in a manor, with the girls dress in swimsuits to charm Shido. Although Origami suggests nudity, they change the idea to simply strip in order to seduce Shido. Kannazuki begins to take things too far so Fraxinus shuts off communication. Initially unfazed by their advances, Yuzuru, Kaguya, Natsumi, Yoshino, Kotori, Miku, and Origami spontaneously got Shido to feel lust. Tohka is the final; however, Shido collapses and develops abnormal Spirit signs and a spatial quake is about to emerge from him that could be more disastrous than previous one 30 years ago. The Spirit Team race against time, except Kotori, who had prepared a weapon for this occasion, but Origami and Tohka stops her. Kurumi lends a hand, as the girls take turns in kissing Shido. Both Tohka and Shido's Sandalphon clash; a defenseless Tohka walks up and comes to the realization of love, and kisses him. His body and personality is cured, while Shido and Tohka share a moment alone.
