= List of Heaven's Lost Property chapters =

Heaven's Lost Property is a Japanese manga series written and illustrated by Suu Minazuki. It began monthly serialization in the May 2007 issue of Shōnen Ace sold on March 26, 2007, and concluded with the March 2014 issue sold on January 26, 2014. The first tankōbon was released by Kadokawa Shoten on September 26, 2007, with a total of 20 tankōbon released in Japan. Chapter titles are often suffixed with two exclamation points.

In addition, a four-panel comic, titled Sora no Otoshimono Pico (そらのおとしものPICO, Sora no Otoshimono Piko), illustrated by ms, was developed and published in the inaugural issue of Kadokawa Shoten's 4-Koma Nano Ace magazine (published on March 9, 2011), and continued in Shōnen Ace until its conclusion on March 26, 2011. It focuses on the lives of Astraea, Nymph, and Ikaros.

== Volume list ==
No.	Japanese release date	Japanese ISBN
1	September 26, 2007	978-4-04-713973-2
Chapter 1: Falling; Chapter 2: Conquer; Chapter 3: Soar; Chapter 4: Sink; Extra: The First Errand
2	December 26, 2007	978-4-04-715013-3
Chapter 5: Homework; Chapter 6: Dirge; Chapter 7: Blown Up; Chapter 8: Homeless; Extra: The First Allowance - UMA chapter; Chapter 9: Lies
3	July 26, 2008	978-4-04-715079-9
Chapter 10: Emotions; Chapter 11: The Female Bath Area; Chapter 12: School; Chapter 13: Multiply; Chapter 14: Smile Attack
4	January 26, 2009	978-4-04-715164-2
Chapter 15: Toy; Extra: The North Wind and the Sun - UMA chapter; Chapter 16: Orders; Chapter 17: Camp; Chapter 18: Dive
5	April 25, 2009	978-4-04-715228-1
Chapter 19: Contest; Chapter 20: Date; Chapter 21: Culture; Chapter 22: Eliminate; Extra: Her First Change of Residence - Sohara Mitsuki chapter; Extra: Her First Change of Clothes - Nymph chapter
6	September 26, 2009	978-4-04-715292-2
Chapter 23: War; Chapter 24: Investigation; Chapter 25: Out of Money; Chapter 26: Supplementary Lessons; Extra: The First Excavation
7	October 26, 2009	978-4-04-715301-1
Chapter 27: Swimming; Chapter 28: Survival; Chapter 29: Chaos; Chapter 30: Dolly; Extra: The North Wind and the Sun 2; Extra: The Smartest Kid Championship
8	March 26, 2010	978-4-04-715399-8
Chapter 31: Second-Generation Angeloid; Extra: Hide Your Porn Underneath Your Bed (Astraea, Nymph, Ikaros versions); Chapter 32: Letter; Chapter 33: Cleansing; Chapter 34: New Member
9	September 9, 2010 (with DVD ed.); September 25, 2010 (normal ed.)	978-4-04-900800-5; ISBN 978-4-04-715520-6
Chapter 35: Purity; Chapter 36: Doubts; Chapter 37: Hiyori; Chapter 38: Forgetfulness
10	October 26, 2010	978-4-04-715545-9
Chapter 39: Conflict; Chapter 40: Leaving the Club; Chapter 41: Execution; Chapter 42: Combine; Extra: An Oppai Mousepad and I - Tomoki Sakurai arc
11	January 26, 2011	978-4-04-715603-6
Chapter 43: Division; Chapter 44: Culture; Chapter 45: Freedom; Chapter 46: Love; Extra: Hide Your Porn Underneath Your Bed (conclusion)
12	June 4, 2011	978-4-04-715711-8
Chapter 47: The Road Home; Chapter 48: Stray Dogs; Chapter 49: Sakurai; Chapter 50: Measurement
13	November 26, 2011	978-4-04-120008-7
Chapter 51: Watermelon; Extra: But I Just Picked Them Up! (Sohara, Astraea, Nymph, Ikaros); Chapter 52: Language; Chapter 53: The World; Chapter 54: Sign of Life
14	March 26, 2012	978-4-04-120163-3
Chapter 55: Power; Chapter 56: Intellect; Chapter 57: Holy Night
15	July 26, 2012	978-4-04-120322-4
Chapter 58: Friendship; Chapter 59: Siblings; Chapter 60: Sisters; Chapter 61: Chops
16	October 24, 2012	978-4-04-120442-9
Chapter 62: Shyness; Chapter 63: Tides; Chapter 64: Cycle; Chapter 65: Fireworks
17	April 26, 2013	978-4-04-120666-9
Chapter 66: End of Summer; Chapter 67: Family; Chapter 68: Lost Memories; Chapter 69: Reward
18	October 26, 2013	978-4-04-120821-2
Chapter 70: Moral; Chapter 71: Expiation; Chapter 72: Lithography; Chapter 73: Demise
19	February 26, 2014	978-4-04-120976-9
Chapter 74: Void; Chapter 75: Freedom; Chapter 76: Happiness
20	March 26, 2014	978-4-04-121046-8
Chapter 77: Normality; Extra: The First Birthday; Extra: White or Black
