= List of Plunderer episodes =

Plunderer
- No. of episodes: 24

Release
- Original network: Tokyo MX, KBS, TVA, SUN, BS11, AT-X
- Original release: January 8 – June 24, 2020

Plunderer is a Japanese anime television series produced by Geek Toys based on the manga series of the same name written by written and illustrated by Suu Minazuki. The anime series premiered from January 8 to June 24, 2020. From episodes 1–11, the opening theme is "Plunderer" by Miku Itō while the ending theme is "Countless Days" by Rina Honnizumi. From episodes 12–24, the second opening theme is "Kokou no Hikari Lonely dark" by Itō Miku while the second ending theme is "Reason of Life" by Honnizumi Rina, Ozawa Ari, and Itō Shizuka.

Funimation acquired the anime for distribution, and streamed it on FunimationNow in English speaking regions, and on AnimeLab in Australia and New Zealand. Funimation premiered the first two episodes of the series on YouTube in the United Kingdom, Ireland, Australia and New Zealand on December 8, 2019.

== Episodes ==
No.	Title (Note: All English translated titles are taken from Crunchyroll.)	Directed by	Written by	Storyboarded by	Original release date
1	"The Legendary Ace"; Transliteration: "Densetsu no Gekitsui-ō" (Japanese: 伝説の撃墜王)	Hiroyuki Tsuchiya	Masashi Suzuki	Ikuo Morimoto	January 8, 2020 (Note: The first two episodes were given preview screenings by Funimation on December 8, 2019.)
Set in a post-apocalyptic world called Alcia, Hina Farrow is given an enigmatic orb called a Ballot containing the number 10000 by her mother Tsukina, who urges Hina to find a Legendary Ace. Tsukina is then dragged into the Abyss after her Count has reached zero. After searching for five years, Hina travels from her hometown of Fieni to a public foot bath in Irinis, where she meets Licht Bach, first appearing as a masked pervert. Licht is shunned by his boss Nana Bassler, owner of a mobile tavern. After explaining that humans have their worth measured by a number printed on their bodies called a Count, Nana tells Hina that a higher Count means higher authority. Hina unveils that her Count is the number 441 printed on her right inner thigh, which represents the distance in megameters that she has walked so far. Soon after, Hina meets a sergeant major of a soldier faction called the Alcian Royal Army named David, who claims to be a Legendary Ace as he takes her to the military guardhouse. Unable to apprehend Hina's Ballot, David challenges Hina to a Star Stake, a duel wagering their Counts. He severely beats her and takes away 440 from her Count, leaving her with only one. Surprisingly, David admits that he is not a Legendary Ace, who would have been over three centuries old since the Waste War. Suddenly arriving and challenging David to a Star Stake, Licht wagers his Count, the number -999 printed on the back of his left hand. Licht is revealed to be a real Legendary Ace and a Ballot Holder, in which a white star and the number 5700, representing the number of foes that he has defeated, are printed on his ōdachi.
2	"I Hate You!"; Transliteration: "Daikkirai!" (Japanese: だいっきらい！)	Yasuto Nishikata	Masashi Suzuki	Koji Iwai	January 15, 2020
Three centuries ago, the seven Legendary Aces ended the Waste War with their superhuman abilities, but they vanished thereafter. In the present, Licht uses his superhuman speed, in which his footsteps can crack the ground. Meanwhile, Nana mentions that Licht is nicknamed the Ace of Flashing Strikes, even though the number -999 printed on the back of his left hand represents the number of times that he has been rejected by women. With Hina in tow, Licht does a supernatural leap into the sky above, where she promises to treat him to dinner. After Licht defeats David on the ground below, Hina is given her Count to 760, leaving David with only one. Licht suddenly steals Hina's Ballot and leaves her with a stuffed doll in exchange. A devastated Hina later learns from Nana that Licht hid the Ballot inside the stuffed doll because Ballots are actually illegal to own. Hina tearfully tries to stop Licht from leaving her. When he ignores her pleas, she shouts that she hates him, which decreases his Count from -999 to -1000. Suddenly, Hina is approached by one of David's subordinates named Nicola, who is revealed to be an agent from a spy faction called the Special Services Unit. Nicola thanks Hina for her help, informing his commanding officer that Licht has finally been located.
3	"Uniforms are Uniforms"; Transliteration: "Seifuku dakara shikatanai" (Japanese: 制服だから仕方ない)	Koichiro Kuroda	Shinya Murakami	Hidetoshi Yoshida	January 22, 2020
Hina is relieved when Nana informs that the Alcian Royal Army has started distributing wanted posters of Licht, believing that he is currently holding onto Hina's Ballot. A sergeant major named Lynn May and her subordinate named Pele Poporo are stationed in a peaceful mountain village called Homhough. It is revealed that Lynn's Count on her uniform represents the number of times that she volunteers to help people. After Pele shows Lynn the wanted poster, Lynn encounters Licht wearing a pudding costume, revealing that his Count represents the number of times that he has been rejected by women. Pele poorly advises Lynn to go on a pity date with Licht. Lynn's Count increases after Licht repeatedly gropes Lynn. As Pele points out that Licht is a Ballot Holder, Licht suddenly steals Lynn's sword, only to realizes that Lynn has power legs, enabling her to do strong kicks. Due to Licht's flirting, a flustered Lynn closes her eyes and puckers her lips, but she is greatly irritated when he manages to escape from her sight. A first lieutenant named Jail Murdoch forcefully interrogates Nana on the whereabouts of Licht. Before heading west in order to hunt down Licht, Jail destroys Nana's mobile tavern when she tries to lie that Licht has gone east.
4	"Ballot Holder"; Transliteration: "Barotto Horudā" (Japanese: 違法所持者(バロットホルダー))	Shūji Miyahara	Rie Koshika	Ikuo Morimoto	January 29, 2020
Lynn expresses her despondence to Pele over having lost a potential promotion as a second lieutenant. When Licht suddenly appears, Lynn chases Licht throughout Homhough, leading the villagers to believe there is a lover's quarrel. Licht then makes a clean getaway when Lynn complains about the miniskirt of her uniform. Saying that the mobile tavern must be rebuilt, Nana hires Hina as her employee. Distracted from chasing after Licht, Lynn is bombarded with requests from the villagers. Admired by Lynn's willingness to help others, Licht comes out of hiding and provokes another chase. With the mobile tavern now rebuilt, Hina and Nana serve drinks in the forest. During the chase, Licht ends up getting caught by Jail, who uses iron manipulation which conjures spikes out of the ground, though Licht stands guard while protecting Lynn. Jail starts to attack Licht at full force. Although Jail's Count on his right black glove is seemingly 900, Jail creates an iron barrier while revealing that he is a Ballot Holder and his true Count is 12500, which represents the number of convictions that he has made. Jail hides his true Count in order to avoid getting a promotion that would land him behind an office desk. He wants to honor his convictions and achieve his goals.
5	"Don't Apologize, Apologize"; Transliteration: "Ayamaruna, yamare" (Japanese: 謝るな、謝れ)	Ryo Miyata	Rie Koshika	Tetsuhito Saito	February 5, 2020
Inside the iron barrier, Licht and Jail engage in an intense battle, as Jail's iron manipulation is strengthened by his convictions. Licht surrenders after being confined to iron restraints conjured by Jail, who deduces that Licht was a former soldier in the Alcian Royal Army based on his hand-to-hand combat techniques, though Licht refuses to answer. When Jail proceeds to torture Licht with an iron chain, Lynn shields Licht and gets injured in the process. Jail berates Lynn for ignoring her official duties of punishing criminals in favor of spending time on her volunteer work. Licht easily cuts through Jail's iron restraints, noting that he held back his strength because Lynn did not want Homhough to be harmed. As Licht and Jail attack each other at full force, Licht demands that Jail should apologize to Lynn for assuming that she is lazy, though she is the one making it peaceful in Homhough. The fight causes a cliff to collapse, which sends Lynn plummeting. Before Jail can rush to catch Lynn, Licht saves her in the blink of an eye. However, Licht's Count decreases from -1000 to -1001 after he angers Lynn for calling her heavy. On his way down, Licht tosses Lynn to Jail, who lets Licht escape and carries Lynn to safety. Out of repentance, Jail creates an iron playground for Homhough, deciding to invite Lynn to join him on a mission to catch Licht again in three days. Jail's Count decreases from 12500 to 12499 since he broke his conviction. Licht is shown camping in the woods while looking up at the night sky.
6	"Hunch"; Transliteration: "Kan" (Japanese: 勘)	Naoyoshi Kusaka	Masashi Suzuki	Hiroki Hayashi	February 12, 2020
Hina and Nana finally find Licht in the grassland. Nana says that Jail has set up roadblocks all over Alcia due to the incident in Homhough, while a jealous Hina scolds Licht for leaving her behind. Licht is forced to save a woman named Pelmo from falling to her death in an experimental human-powered aircraft resembling a steel bird. Bringing them to her shed, Pelmo asks Licht and Hina to help make her dream of flight come true, even though aviation research is a crime punishable by death. Licht modifies the design of Pelmo's tenth steel bird prototype by adding a missing part. Licht and Hina wait outside while Pelmo works on the steel bird prototype. When Pelmo finishes upgrading her steel bird prototype, soldiers of the Alcian Royal Guard appear on the grassland, which forces Licht to destroy Pelmo's steel bird prototype. The soldiers leave after being convinced that the wings were broken windmill sails. Pelmo's Count on her left arm, which represents the number of her fulfilled dreams, has reached zero after having failed ten times. The Abyss opens up and Pelmo is willingly dragged inside, having a hunch that the Abyss is a doorway to a new world and promising to cross paths with Licht and Hina in the future. While Hina is left traumatized from being unable to save Pelmo, Licht nearly faints as the number 001 flashes in his left eye after he tried to slash the Abyss with his ōdachi.
7	"It was Delicious"; Transliteration: "Umakattayo" (Japanese: 美味かったよ)	Hiroyuki Okuno	Masashi Suzuki	Koji Iwai	February 19, 2020
In a tent, Licht wakes up and prepares to leave, but he reconsiders when Hina asks him to stay during her somniloquy. Licht and Hina visit a town square, but Lynn and Pele spot them. Lynn tries to arrest Licht not long before thanking him for saving her life in Homhough. After Hina and Lynn swap stories of how they met Licht, Nana hosts a cooking competition for Hina and Lynn with Licht as the prize. Lynn cooks a sweet-smelling cream stew using various vegetables, while Hina cooks a deadly-smelling meat stew using a black bear and a wild boar as game. Licht is left undecided between both delicious dishes, but Jail suddenly arrives and berates Lynn for being distracted again. After Licht and Jail have another intense match, Nana scolds them for their immaturity and recklessness. At night, Nana serves drinks in the town square. The next morning, Jail, Lynn and Pele are hungover from partying all night. Having left the town square earlier, Licht, Hina and Nana reach the town of Anesis, while Jail, Lynn and Pele encounter a dying soldier upon reaching the town of Linden, which has been completely destroyed.
8	"Demon of the Abyss"; Transliteration: "Abisu no Akuma" (Japanese: アビスの悪魔)	Shūji Miyahara	Rie Koshika	Nami Mugiba	February 26, 2020
There are no survivors in Linden, and its lake has been swallowed by the Abyss. An injured soldier arrives and claims that a fire-breathing demon came from the Abyss and destroyed Linden. While Jail does not believe this story, Lynn and Pele take the injured soldier for treatment in Anesis, where they find Licht, Hina and Nana. Before Jail starts confronting Licht on what he knows about the demon of the Abyss, Nana suggests for Licht and Jail to play a drinking game. Jail drunkenly accuses Licht of being a Legendary Ace, though Licht chooses to ignore this. Nana provokes Licht and Jail to continue drinking. At the sidelines, Hina believes that Lynn really likes Licht. As Licht and Jail eventually pass out, Hina and Lynn rush to use their laps as pillows for Licht's head. Suddenly, the Abyss opens in the middle of Anesis and emanates a strange noise. While Jail prepares to mandate an evacuation, Licht recognizes the strange noise and tells Jail to call off the evacuation. Licht and Jail watch as a helicopter gunship emerges from the Abyss.
9	"Plunderer"; Transliteration: "Purandara" (Japanese: プランダラ)	Hiroyuki Tsuchiya	Masashi Suzuki	Koji Iwai	March 4, 2020
As the helicopter gunship attacks Anesis, Jail shields everyone with an iron wall, which is then destroyed by a missile. Jail becomes confused when Licht reveals that he was a former colonel in the Alcian Royal Army. The townspeople begin to evacuate as Licht draws attention to the helicopter gunship, but he is stopped by Althing, the long black hands that emerge from the Abyss. While trying to grab the helicopter gunship, Althing is attacked by Licht, who is repeatedly electrocuted as a result. Jail informs Hina that attacking Althing is punishable by death. Finding a loophole in the law, Jail takes off his glasses and attacks Althing with iron bars, while Lynn and Pele decide to play along. Licht is given a path to reach the helicopter gunship, but he is surprised when he looks inside the cockpit. The helicopter gunship is suddenly shot down into the Abyss by Mizuka Sonohara, who has the number 32000 printed on her mechanical left arm. Mizuka shoots Jail in the chest before revealing that she is nicknamed the Ace of Pursuit. As she commits mass murder in Anesis using bullet manipulation, Mizuka explains that she is obsessively following the last order that Licht gave her during the Waste War. Hina, Nana, Lynn and Pele are held captive by some agents working under Mizuka, who then urges Licht to kill her, threatening the life of a young boy. This causes Licht to snap and kill the agents by simply making them vanish into thin air. Licht finally unveils that he is the Plunderer, and his goal is to take everything that Althea has to offer.
10	"Serious"; Transliteration: "Honki" (Japanese: 本気)	Shougo Hanagami	Masashi Suzuki	Hidetoshi Yoshida	March 11, 2020
A Star Stake commences in an all-or-nothing showdown between Licht and Mizuka. Despite being shot several times by Mizuka, Licht succumbs to his bloodlust, releasing a powerful aura and raising his Count to 57000. Licht moves at untraceable speeds with his shockwave blasts, overwhelming Mizuka. Nana finally reveals that Licht has been taken over by an alter ego who will only stop when he collapses from fatigue. Licht defeats Mizuka, whose Count drops to 16000. Having also been under the influence of an alter ego, Mizuka reverts to her real personality. Nana seriously believes that Mizuka, who was the kindest of all the Legendary Aces, was drugged to force out her powers and fight Licht. When Hina desperately hugs Licht, he prepares to kill her until Mizuka shoots at him, prompting Licht to approach Mizuka instead. Mizuka is suddenly saved by Jail, revealed to still be alive despite his chest wound. Jail holds back Licht by transforming a small iron piece into a long iron bar. Licht proclaims that he kills his enemies in order to spare that pain onto his friends. Deciding to honor this, Jail fights with all his might, revealing that he has the number 45000 printed on his left black glove. Jail creates an iron devil that knocks out Licht, who then reverts to his real personality. In a church serving as a base of operations for the Special Services Unit, a field marshal named Schmerman Bach reads the story of The Tortoise and the Hare to some children, though this dark rendition of the story says that the Tortoise drank the blood of a wizard and killed the Hare at the end of the race. Nicola reports to Schmerman that there was some unexpected interference at Anesis.
11	"Up My Sleeve"; Transliteration: "Totteoki" (Japanese: とっておき)	Naoyoshi Kusaka	Rie Koshika	Ikuo Morimoto	March 18, 2020
As Licht, Hina, Nana, Lynn, Pele and Mizuka recover in a cottage, Althing has not left yet since the Star Stake between Licht and Mizuka remains deadlocked. Much to Licht's amusement, Lynn, Nana and Mizuka are harassed by Althing due to their large busts, unlike that of Hina. Meanwhile, Jail is summoned to the royal capital of Neue Welt, the main headquarters of the Alcian Royal Guard, where he meets supreme commander Alexandrov Grigorovich, his doting adoptive father. Alexandrov informs Jail that the Special Services Unit serves for espionage, abduction and assassination. Furthermore, Alexandrov reveals that the Legendary Aces like Licht were surgically altered humans employed during the Waste War, in which the Legendary Aces stopped aging since then. Recalling that Jail made honesty as one of his convictions, Alexandrov notices that Jail's Count drops to 12498 when Jail lies about Licht being kept hidden. When Jail returns to the cottage, he proceeds to arrest Licht, who willingly complies. In the woods, Nicola is revealed to be disguised as the injured soldier from Anesis, hoping that Licht continues to plunder for the benefit of the Special Services Unit. Jail lies to the others in the cottage about being blackmailed, which lowers his Count to 12496. When Jail tries to arrest Licht with iron handcuffs, Nana slaps Jail in the face and calls him out for not making his own decisions. Nana finally reveals herself as a Legendary Ace with a white star and the number seven printed under her left eye, in which she has the ability of time travel as an ace up her sleeve. Nana sends Hina, Jail, Lynn and Pele to the past outside an academy in modern Japan. Mizuka and Licht, who was then known as Rihito Sakai, appear as teenaged students attending the academy.
12	"Entrance Ceremony"; Transliteration: "Nyūkōshiki" (Japanese: 入校式)	Masaharu Tomoda	Masashi Suzuki	Koji Iwai, Tetsuhito Saito	April 1, 2020
Hina, Jail, Lynn and Pele enter the academy and try to find out how to change the past. They are soon confronted by Taketora Doan, but Jail is left defenseless without his black gloves, while Mizuka and Tokikaze Sakai try to stop Taketora. However, a rivalry is sparked between Jail and Tokikaze. During the entrance ceremony, captain Alan and second lieutenant Firenda explain that Japan is the only country left after a world war, revealing that the academy is the 13th Special Military Forces School. Then, major Schmerman, the headmaster, begins to read The Tortoise and the Hare, but Alan shoots three students named Saki Ichinose, Genji Akui and Kyouhei Suda in the head when they mock Schmerman. Alan then threatens to shoot Hina, but Jail and Tokikaze try to fight Alan. Rihito performs a magic trick for Schmerman by making flowers appear on the twig, though Schmerman encourages Rihito to snap his neck instead. Rihito refuses to comply and offers to die in Hina's place, unaffected by Schmerman's powerful aura. Firenda calms the situation, while Alan reveals that he shot paint bullets at Saki, Genji and Kyouhei, making a point about disobeying orders. In the headmaster's office, Alan learns that Schmerman has an interest in Rihito. At the school library, Pele shows Hina, Lynn and Jail that he was denied access to research Althing on a computer. While passing by, Alan explains that Althing was an extremely advanced technology that crash-landed on Earth during the world war. Althing was built to take votes and use its mysterious power to force the majority decision on humanity, who voted to ban warfare and dispose of nuclear weapons, though resulting in unintended consequences. Hina, Lynn, Pele and Jail begin to realize their true mission in changing the past.
13	"Full Stomach"; Transliteration: "Haraippai" (Japanese: 腹いっぱい)	Ken Katō	Masashi Suzuki	Koji Iwai	April 8, 2020
Hina, Jail, Lynn and Pele decide to enroll in the academy, in which Schmerman will take the place of Alan to personally instruct the students. Alan previously overheard Hina, Jail, Lynn and Pele talking about Alcia in the school library. Schmerman says that the every student will receive two stars, in which they will graduate with extra food rations after collecting ten stars and they will face expulsion after reaching zero stars. After it is explained that stars can be earned by performing tasks or by stealing from classmates, Hina and Jail realize that this is the origin of Star Stakes. As a surprising twist, Rihito does not receive any stars and is given three days before facing expulsion. It is revealed that Rihito simply enrolled to convince his adoptive brother Tokikaze to stop pursuing the dream of becoming a soldier. Three days later, Rihito is framed for stealing stars by breaking into school lockers, including that of Saki, Genji and Kyouhei, but Taketora is caught for bullying Mizuka to give up her stars. Taketora then forces Tokikaze to give up his two stars since Tokikaze's grandmother has a dojo which belongs to Taketora's parents. The other students share their stars to avoid facing expulsion, but Tokikaze is left with zero stars. Tokikaze desperately wants to graduate so his malnourished grandmother can finally have a full stomach. After giving up his last star to Tokikaze, Jail confronts Taketora outside the main gate. Schmerman intervenes as it is revealed that Rihito previously pickpocketed Taketora, leaving Toketora with only two stars instead of twelve stars. Jail is rewarded two stars for his loyalty, while Rihito decides to stay at the academy with Tokikaze.
14	"7 Minutes 12 Seconds"; Transliteration: "Nana fun jūni byō" (Japanese: 7分12秒)	Hiroyuki Okuno	Masashi Suzuki	Ikuo Morimoto	April 15, 2020
When Rihito is suspected of peeping in the women's bath, Saki and her friends Asumi Sumitani and Kyouka Narimiya catch Rihito in the act after Pele switched the bath entrance signs, leading Jail to accidentally enter the women's bath instead of the men's bath. Since Alan technically caught Rihito in the end, the students are forced to survive in the woods together. When Rihito purposely knocks Saki, Asumi and Kyouka into a river, they decide to abandon their embarrassment like disciplined soldiers, leading a disappointed Rihito to question their willingness to become killers. Schmerman suddenly appears and suggests that the students could become a nonlethal army strong enough to scare off their opponents. Later on, Jail follows Schmerman to a hidden laboratory, where Firenda, Alan and David fail to replicate the voting power of Althing, which banned nuclear weapons but not the concept of war itself. After witnessing Schmerman, Firenda, Alan and David undergoing a project on Legendary Aces by experimenting on lab rats, Jail is saved by the timely arrival of a young Nana, who is nicknamed the Ace of Knowing. In her bedroom, Nana explains that she is the first Legendary Ace who survived being surgically altered by having genes from Schmerman, who can naturally harmonize with Althing, implanted inside her to gain the ability of time travel. Unable to provide any more information after seven minutes and twelve seconds, Nana gives Jail a memory card, which contains the reason for being sent to the past. After promising to see Nana in 300 years, Jail is soon caught by Alan on his way to the elevator.
15	"The Army That Does Not Kill"; Transliteration: "Korosanai guntai" (Japanese: 殺さない軍隊)	Naoki Matsuura	Shinya Murakami	Naoki Matsuura	April 22, 2020
As Jail realizes that Alan is actually a young Alexandrov, Alan deduces that Nana is trying to change the past which will alter the future. The next day, Alan escorts Hina, Jail, Lynn and Pele to a suburban area full of starving residents, demonstrating that there is no practical way to feed everyone. In the school library, Hina, Jail, Lynn and Pele remain undecided since the existence of Alcia was spawned by Licht winning the Waste War. After the students become exhausted from jogging around a track wearing heavy backpacks, Jail provokes a sparring match with Alan. Jail wants to defeat Alan in hopes of being the supreme commander in the future. Schmerman begins training the students with medieval melee weapons, explaining that guns and grenades will soon become obsolete. Back in the laboratory, Schmerman and Firenda discuss that the upcoming Waste War is meant to rid the world of wasteful humans. Later at the beach, Schmerman arranges for a game of capture the flag, in which the only permitted weapons are water guns filled with ink. In the final round, Rihito's team faces against Taketora's team. Vowing to become the army that does not kill, Rihito's team wins the game when they outwit Taketora into a trapping pit. In celebration, Rihito is named commander of his class. Meanwhile, Alan and Firenda learn that Schmerman received a message from David saying that he was tricked before he met his demise on a mission. Left with no other choice, Schmerman finally agrees with Firenda to begin human subject research in order to continue the project on Legendary Aces. The strongest candidate for this project is Rihito.
16	"A War For Waste Disposal"; Transliteration: "Haikibutsushori no Tame no Sensō" (Japanese: 廃棄物処理のための戦争)	Hiroyuki Tsuchiya	Masashi Suzuki	Hidetoshi Yoshida	April 29, 2020
Jail tells Hina, Lynn and Pele that they must not stop Rihito from undergoing the Ace procedure by Firenda in the laboratory. Taketora claims that Mizuka is a weakling and proceeds to steal her remaining star before leaving. However, Jail ends up giving up one of his two remaining stars to Mizuka after advising her to have conviction. Lynn confides in Pele that she loves Licht. Hina and Jail both believe that Alcia will still exist if they allow Rihito to become Licht but have him remain nonlethal. As Pele almost admits that he loves Lynn, the academy suddenly becomes under siege by the Joint Force, contrary to Althing banning warfare. Leading the surviving students safely to a classroom, Alan is contacted by Firenda, who informs that four out of the seven Ballots in the world revoted to lift the ban on warfare. Moreover, the electricity is cut off in the laboratory, which puts Rihito at risk of dying from cardiac arrest in the middle of a blood transfusion. The students fight their way to the backup generator across the field inside the gym warehouse, though Saki and Genji are among the ones who get injured. As Rihito begins to die, his hair turns white. Alan receives a facial bruise from a rocket launcher. Halted by a Joint Force sergeant, Hina desperately calls out for Licht.
17	"Ace of Flashing Strikes"; Transliteration: "Sengeki no Gekitsui-ō" (Japanese: 閃撃の撃墜王)	Masaharu Tomoda	Rie Koshika	Koji Iwai	May 6, 2020
Rihito survives in the nick of time when Jail manages to start up the backup generator. Schmerman gives Rihito an ōdachi, explaining that is it a Replica of a Ballot activated by a Count of his choosing. Rihito defeats the Joint Force with his superhuman speed, earning him the nickname the Ace of Flashing Strikes. The Joint Force sergeant then reveals that a nuclear bomb is implanted somewhere inside the academy and the detonator is hidden somewhere in his body. Left with no other choice, Rihito ends up beheading the Joint Force sergeant, who lied about the nuclear bomb but commends Rihito for saving his friends. Rihito has a panic attack after breaking his nonlethal oath. Hina, Jail, Lynn and Pele begin to glow as they are being pulled back to the future. Rihito chooses that his Count will represent the number of enemies that he kills on behalf of his friends. Realizing that she had no control over Rihito becoming Licht, Hina decides that she will completely love Rihito, showing her intimacy as a memory for him not to feel lonely in the upcoming Waste War. She promises to meet him in 300 years so she can marry him and bear his children.
18	"Birth of Alcia"; Transliteration: "Arushia tanjō" (Japanese: アルシア誕生)	Ken Katō	Rie Koshika	Ikuo Morimoto	May 13, 2020
Nana narrates the story of the Waste War. Rihito became Licht and single-handedly slaughtered thousands of enemy soldiers, eventually hiding his face behind a mask. Tokikaze, Taketora, Mizuka and Alan later qualified to undergo the Ace procedure. Schmerman told Alan and Firenda that the world is beyond saving. Rihito eventually went berserk and severed Mizuka's left arm. Two years after the Waste War ended, Schmerman, Alan and Firenda collected the seven Ballots, using them to create the utopia called Alcia, which floated above the ruined planet. It is revealed that the population of Alcia was kept in check upon being sent to the Abyss, the portal to the abandoned world, of which its resources were continuously stolen by Althing in order to sustain Alcia. Learning of this, Tokikaze attempted to steal a Ballot, only to be slashed to death by Licht, who was sent into a comatose state due to the trauma. Twenty years after the Waste War ended, Licht regained consciousness and learned that his other classmates committed suicide. After Licht and Nana escaped from the military, Licht never removed his mask and barely spoke even to Nana for the past 300 years. Hina, Jail, Lynn and Pele finally return to the grassland in the future, as Nana states that the past could not be changed. Hina offers herself to Licht, hoping to pick up where they left off 300 years ago.
19	"Cheating"; Transliteration: "Uwaki" (Japanese: 浮気)	Hiroyuki Okuno	Shinya Murakami	Koji Iwai, Tetsuhito Saito	May 20, 2020
Nana celebrates the return of Hina, Jail, Lynn and Pele with some drinks on the house. Mizuka cautiously watches the party from afar. Hina decides to drown her sorrows since Licht turned her down due to the apparent age gap. Realizing that Nana also has unrequited feelings for Licht, Jail punches Licht in the face for being oblivious. The memory card contains recordings of a young Nana documenting about how she felt about Licht for the past 300 years. Licht feels ashamed that he lost his smile and always wore a mask, apologizing to Nana since she was always by his side. The next day, everyone catches some sun at the beach. While Nana chooses to relax, Lynn whips up a nice meal. Lynn is dismayed that she is a little chubby compared to Nana, Hina and even Mizuka. An irritated Hina catches Licht using an animal trap in the woods as he tries to cheat his way out of seeing her. After she demands to know why he keeps avoiding her time after time, he then reveals that he knew her mother Tsukina.
20	"Rain"; Transliteration: "Ame" (Japanese: 雨)	Naoki Matsuura	Rie Koshika	Naoki Matsuura	May 27, 2020
Tsukina was Licht's childhood friend who survived for 300 years without being surgically altered and stole a Ballot from the Special Services Unit five years ago, which left Schmerman with only three Ballots. Moreover, Tokikaze was Hina's father whom Licht previously murdered. Hina, Nana, Lynn and Pele all pass out from wine drugged by Licht, who plans to defeat the Special Services Unit on his own. However, Jail is immune to the wine drugged by Licht. Alexandrov is informed by his secretary Erin that the Special Services Unit assassinated the director of the bureau of intelligence and the deputy superintendent general of the Alcian Royal Army. Calling a meeting with the Three Grand Generals named Robert De Vanvigh, Freidkam Von Lightning and Yi Yang Shallow, Alexandrov tells them that the Special Services Unit is demanding that the Alcian Royal Army should hand over the other three Ballots held in their custody. The existence of Alcia must be reapproved periodically, which means that it is in danger of disappearing since Tsukina previously stole a Ballot. Alexandrov and the Three Grand Generals remain undecided on how to move forward. Jail berates Licht for the emotional pain inflicted on his former classmates, though Licht insistently wants to takes on the Special Services Unit by himself. As he leaves, Licht hopes to see Hina's smiling face when he comes back. The next morning, Hina, Nana, Lynn and Pele recover from the wine and discover that Jail went to Neue Welt. At the Dead City of Hoffnung, Licht is intercepted by Taketora, nicknamed the Ace of Heavy Strikes. Taketora uses his gravitational downforce to nullify Licht's superhuman speed. Licht thinks about Hina as he is crushed under the raining debris.
21	"Father"; Transliteration: "Chichioya" (Japanese: 父親)	Ken Katō	Rie Koshika	Koji Iwai	June 3, 2020
Hina, Nana, Lynn and Pele find an unconscious Licht at the Dead City of Hoffnung before they are surrounded by the Special Services Unit. Meanwhile, Jail interrupts Alexandrov during his lunchtime and challenges him to a Star Stake. Easily melting Jail's iron devil, Alexandrov reveals himself as the Ace of Explosive Strikes. In the past, Alexandrov was a soldier in a small village, where he was a father to an eight-year-old son and a three-year-old daughter. When the children were later murdered, he found the man responsible, but he could not pull the trigger after seeing that the man had a scrawny baby who needed food. In the present, Jail is defeated and his Count reduces to one. Jail points out that Alexandrov chose to raise Jail as his foster son instead of asking Nana to send him back in time to save his own children. Alexandrov fires Jail from the Alcian Royal Army, while Erin gives Jail a new military uniform that is a few millimeters too short. Hina, Lynn and Pele are imprisoned and interrogated by Taketora. Schmerman arrives and reveals that he supported the nonlethal army in order to weed out the weak and find viable candidates to undergo the Ace procedure. He leaves after ordering his henchmen to administer a new drug to Hina, Lynn and Pele, but Taketora kills the henchmen and liberates the three, having a strong belief that a true Legendary Ace suffered through the Waste War. When Hina accidentally drops her Ballot from her bag, a furious Taketora subdues the three after believing that they are plotting to destroy Alcia.
22	"Promise"; Transliteration: "Yakusoku" (Japanese: 約束)	Hiroyuki Okuno	Shinya Murakami	Ikuo Morimoto	June 10, 2020
When Lynn manages to flee on horseback, Taketora uses gravity telekinesis to shoot debris through her torso, gravely wounding her. Taketora agrees to wager the lives of Hina, Pele and even Nana on the certainty that Licht will return by sunrise. Lynn finds the unconscious Licht at the Dead City of Hoffnung and attempts to perform cardiopulmonary resuscitation, but she begins to pass out due to blood loss. She is saved by the arrival of the Homhough villagers, including Avsayette "Greengrocer Lady" Vremya, who encourages Lynn to confess her feelings to the unconscious Licht. When Avsayette is unable to slap Licht awake, Lynn accepts the fact that Licht loves Hina instead. By sunrise, Licht finally wakes up. Hina claims that Taketora is secretly rooting for Licht to be alive, though Taketora angrily denies this just as Licht appears. Nana and Pele carry Lynn to get a blood transfusion. Licht finally admits his feelings for Hina, though he kept this a secret due to his guilt over murdering Tokikaze. Promising to stay by his side through thick and thin, Hina passionately kisses Licht before she goes off to help Nana and Pele treat Lynn. Licht confronts Taketora and plans to destroy Alcia, but Licht also deals with the sudden arrival of Mizuka, who has succumbed to her bloodlust and begins attacking Licht with her rifle.
23	"Unforgivable"; Transliteration: "Yurusanai" (Japanese: 許さない)	Hiroyuki Tsuchiya	Masashi Suzuki	Koji Iwai	June 17, 2020
Schmerman wonders how Licht will pit against Mizuka and Taketora. Licht is blamed for unforgivably causing Mizuka to go berserk and for his former classmates committing suicide to honor his dream of a nonlethal army. Before succumbing to his bloodlust, Licht is stopped by Jail, who offers to fight alongside him. With his Count reduced to one, Jail can only summon a single piece of iron, but it serves enough to block all of Mizuka's shots. Jail renders Mizuka psychologically incapable of finding her mark. She breaks down crying after admitting that she no longer wants to shoot him. Licht plans to rebuild his nonlethal army since Alcia was flawed from the beginning. During an intense fistfight, Taketora reveals that he had to kill hundreds of young assassins sent after Licht since the latter was incapable of murdering children. Taketora wants to prevent another war, while Licht refuses to let Alcia continue stealing from the weak. Since their duel will not end until one of them is left standing, Taketora creates a black hole, engulfing Licht inside it.
24	"My Ace"; Transliteration: "Watashi no Gekitsui-ō" (Japanese: 私の撃墜王)	Hiroyuki Kanbe	Masashi Suzuki	Ikuo Morimoto	June 24, 2020
Licht awakens in the world of darkness, where floating masks belonging to Taketora, Alexandrov, Mizuka, Tokikaze, Nana, Licht himself and even Pele try to convince him to give up pursuing the impossible dream of a nonlethal army. Although he eventually accepts himself as a murderer, Licht regains the motive to come back to his friends. He successfully destroys the masks and pierces through the world of darkness, bringing him back to the real world. After Licht knocks out Taketora, a flashback reveals that they promised to end the Waste War together. When Taketora recovers, he returns Hina's Ballot before leaving. Lynn awakens to the Homhough villagers by her bedside, as she accepts having been rejected by Licht. Jail reminds Nana of the promise that he made 300 years ago. It is revealed that Licht knew that Pele is an agent from the Special Services Unit named Gespenst Zerlegen working undercover as a soldier from the Alcian Royal Army, though Licht trusted Pele due to his feelings for Lynn. Avsayette encourages Pele to confess his feelings for Lynn, which he does over a meal. In the grassland, Hina tries to seduce Licht. Much to Licht's relief, this is interrupted by the arrival of Nana, Jail, Lynn and Pele. Discussing the next move, Licht plans to collect all seven Ballots in an effort to find a way for humanity on Alcia to survive without Althing. Everyone, including Mizuka, agrees with this plan of action. Meanwhile, Schmerman begins his plans of taking over Neue Welt using several unseen figures implied to be Licht's former classmates. Licht, Hina, Nana, Jail, Lynn, Pele and Mizuka embark on their journey, as Hina declares that Licht is her Legendary Ace.
