= Heaven's Lost Property Final – The Movie: Eternally My Master =

- Japanese theatrical release poster featuring Ikaros and Tomoki flying to Synapse.

Japanese name
- Kanji: そらのおとしものFinal 永遠の私の鳥籠(エターナルマイマスター)
Transcriptions
- Revised Hepburn: Sora no Otoshimono Final: Etānaru Mai Masutā
- Directed by: Hisashi Saitō
- Written by: Jiyū Ōgi
- Based on: Heaven's Lost Property by Suu Minazuki
- Produced by: Chiaki Kurakane
- Cinematography: Nozomi Shitara; Tsubasa Yokoyama
- Music by: Motoyoshi Iwasaki
- Production company: Production IMS
- Distributed by: Kadokawa Pictures
- Release date: April 26, 2014
- Running time: 50 minutes
- Country: Japan
- Language: Japanese
- Box office: $318,616

Heaven's Lost Property Final – The Movie: Eternally My Master (そらのおとしものFinal 永遠の私の鳥籠(エターナルマイマスター), Sora no Otoshimono Final: Etānaru Mai Masutā) is a 2014 Japanese anime film based on the manga and anime series Heaven's Lost Property by Suu Minazuki.

== Synopsis ==
The scene opens with the Zeus' destruction above Synapse, Tomoki calls for Nymph to return immediately; unfortunately Ikaros responds that Nymph isn't coming. Tomoki commands Ikaros to take him straight to Synapse as the Earth's surface deliberately vanishes. While flying towards Synapse, Ikaros tells Tomoki a story how long ago due to malfunction she was once ordered by a "boy" to attack Synapse out of desperation. Remarking a dying Sugata, Ikaros' body begins burning away because of a device installed within her whenever she approaches Synapse without permission. Having second thoughts, Tomoki orders Ikaros to go back but cannot since there is nowhere else to go to.

The film shifts to where Tomoki wakes up by Ikaros who attempted to kiss him. Tomoki has a rough morning when Nymph invites him on a date, with Astraea and Chaos joining in. Then meets up with Sohara as Chaos questions what a date is. Meanwhile, Hiyori visits Ikaros to see how well she's cultivating watermelons, and then Sugata and Mikako come over to interrogate the existence of Synapse or about Hiyori's return. Though Ikaros defies anything regarding Synapse, Hiyori reveals the reason of her "return" was due to Tomoki's unique existence in the particular world they are living in now. Sugata concludes the world continuum is all connected to Synapse. As everyone comes home, Tomoki wonders why Ikaros doesn't show emotions and thinks it because of the imprinting chain. Nymph and Astraea get into a sister fight. Tomoki is getting tired of the troublesome routine and tries to kick them out but they shout his own words back at him that Angeloids are freeloaders. Tomoki then breaks Ikaros' imprinting, with Daedalus and Sohara muttering their dismay. Tomoki's day becomes even rougher as everyone are condemning him. Mikako takes Ikaros to her household for the time-being to aggravate Tomoki.

Worried that Ikaros is now in Mikako's care and Tomoki still being stubborn, Sohara, Nymph, and Astraea, dredge Tomoki's room for a restoration card. Scanning, they found one in Tomoki's pants, which activates it sending them to a dimension on a train in a blizzard with Tomoki's grandfather aboard. In order to return home, they have to oblige the rules at whenever station they get off at. Passing by stations for a chance to date or kiss Tomoki, things get worse as the farther stations become more ecchi. Sohara, Nymph, and Astraea jump out of the train, but find themselves in a freezing cabin as the last stop, where they are forced to warm up naked with Tomoki.

Meanwhile, back in the real world, Mikako scans Ikaros' memory (speculate that Mikako is possibly an Angel) and does something strange to her. The next day, the girls try to make breakfast for Tomoki, however, their quality doesn't meet any standard. Then Ikaros crashes in picking up Tomoki in a bold manner saying she won't hand him over to anyone and that only she will take care of him. Flying in the air, Ikaros recklessly drops Tomoki atop a restaurant on his command as their date. Proposing they should go somewhere with just the two of them, Ikaros chases after Tomoki begging him to be her master again. Arriving at the sakura tree, Tomoki reminisces all that happened since he met Ikaros. The others show up lecturing him that he needs to think deeply how Ikaros feels and what she wants. Mikako then "orders" Ikaros to throw Tomoki somewhere high up, as a way of to provoke their feelings for each other. Screaming out of despair about what she was made for and with no other place to go to, Ikaros tearfully begs Tomoki to be her master as he is all she ever wants. Realizing his foolishness he accepts her imprinting and returns to everyone happily. Daedalus replies "That's a relief".

Returning to the opening scene, Ikaros kisses Tomoki and shows her smile before disappearing in his arms as they arrive in Synapse.

== Voice cast ==
| Character | Japanese | English |
|---|---|---|
| Tomoki Sakurai | Soichiro Hoshi | Greg Ayres |
| Ikaros | Saori Hayami | Brittney Karbowski |
| Sohara Mitsuki | Mina | Trina Nishimura |
| Eishiro Sugata | Tatsuhisa Suzuki | Eric Vale |
| Nymph | Iori Nomizu | Kara Edwards |
| Astraea | Kaori Fukuhara | Carli Mosier |
| Hiyori Kazane | Yōko Hikasa | Colleen Clinkenbeard |
| Daedalus | Asuka Ōgame | Monica Rial |
| Chaos | Aki Toyosaki | Carrie Savage |
| Tomozo Sakurai | Hiroshi Iwasaki | Bill Flynn |
| Minos | Shinichiro Miki | |

== Production ==
Hisashi Saito returned to direct the film at Production IMS. Jiyū Ōgi wrote the script with supervision from series scriptwriter Yuuko Kakihara. Yoshihiro Watanabe returned to design the characters. The series cast returned for the film to reprise their roles.

== Release ==
Heaven's Lost Property Final – The Movie: Eternally My Master was released theatrically in Japan on April 26, 2014, where it was distributed by Kadokawa Pictures.

On September 17, 2020, it was announced that Funimation would stream the film in Japanese with English subtitles on September 25, 2020, in the U.S. and Canada. Funimation released the film on Blu-ray and DVD with English dubbing on January 11, 2022.
