= Minazuki (disambiguation) =

Minazuki (Japanese: 水無月; "month of water") is the traditional name of the month of June in the Japanese calendar. It can also refer to:

- Suu Minazuki (水無月すう), Japanese manga artist
- Japanese destroyer Minazuki, two destroyers of the Imperial Japanese Navy

== Fictional characters ==
- Karen Minazuki, a character in Yes! Pretty Cure 5
