= Anne Freaks =

Japanese manga series

- Cover of Anne Freaks volume 1 as published by Kadokawa Shoten

アンネ フリークス (Anne furīkusu)
- Manga
- Written by: Yua Kotegawa
- Published by: Kadokawa Shoten
- English publisher: NA: ADV Manga
- Magazine: Shōnen Ace
- Original run: September 2000 – October 2002
- Volumes: 4

Anne Freaks (Japanese: アンネ フリークス, Hepburn: Anne furīkusu) is a horror manga written by Yua Kotegawa. It was originally serialized in the magazine Shōnen Ace in 2000. It was compiled into four volumes. The manga was licensed in English by ADV.

== Plot ==
The story follows the efforts of three teenagers to overthrow a religious cult with terrorist leanings, the Kakusei Group, which their families belonged to. Anna, the daughter of the cult leader, Todo, was rescued by a cult dissenter, Moe, as a young girl. Trained from an early age to kill, Anna's only close bond is with Moe, and her main purpose in life is to kill her father. In her efforts to reach this goal, she comes into contact with two other teens who once belonged to the cult with her: Yuri Kitagawa, a shy young man who lives with his domineering mother, and Mitsuba Maezona, a delinquent who has been raised by strangers he believes to be his family.

Yuri meets Anna after he "kills" his mother—or rather, watches her die from the results of a suicide attempt. Abused and controlled by his mother for most of his life, he feels liberated by her death as well as a strong sense of guilt. When Anna offers to help him dispose of the body and asks him to accompany her on her quest, he falls in love with her and accepts. However, Yuri is somewhat timid and innocent, and often finds Anna's violent approach to solving problems unnerving.

Mitsuba joins up with Anna and Yuri after his adopted family is killed by members of the Kakusei Group, because they had kidnapped him from the cult when he was a child. Mitsuba meets Anna and Yuri first because Anna saves him while he is fighting with the Kakusei group. His motivation is to get revenge for his family's murders, and Anna's plans to go after the cult collide with his own desires.

Though their violent antics are initially very unheroic, the three teens soon begin to confront the question of right and wrong as they battle the Kakusei Group as well as try to avoid the machinations of Inspector Nishikama, the detective assigned to the Kakusei Group case who will use anyone and anything to destroy the cult, even children. Anna and Yuri also start to develop feelings for each other. Anna, Yuri, and Mitsuba also run into another former cult member, Kunita, who has become a preacher. He implores them to look for a better option than violence, but he is also committed to destroying the Kakusei Group, as well as protecting the three kids with Moe. Another adult who wishes to help them is Sergeant Shono, an idealistic member of the Juvenile Affairs division assigned to their case. She insists that no matter what actions they have done, they are only children and therefore need to be protected and cared for. Inspector Nishikama and Sergeant Shono often butt heads over this issue. She also makes a bargain with them. She will help them take down the Kakusei group but Yuri, Mitsuba and Anna must all turn themselves in after they destroy the Kakusei group. Also, Anna and the others can no longer kill anyone other than those who once belonged in the Kakusei group. Anna, Mitsuba and Yuri agree to the bargain. However, as the situation becomes more dire, differences must eventually be put aside.

== Volumes ==
=== Japanese ===
1. ISBN 4-04-713388-4, February 2001
2. ISBN 4-04-713447-3, September 2001
3. ISBN 4-04-713484-8, April 2002
4. ISBN 4-04-713513-5, November 2002
