= Heaven's Lost Property =

Japanese manga series and its franchise

- Cover of the first volume featuring Ikaros.

そらのおとしもの (Sora no Otoshimono)
- Genre: Fantasy comedy, harem
- Manga
- Written by: Suu Minazuki
- Published by: Kadokawa Shoten
- Magazine: Monthly Shōnen Ace
- Original run: March 26, 2007 – January 26, 2014
- Volumes: 20
- Anime television series
- Directed by: Hisashi Saitō
- Produced by: Tsuneo Takechi; Seiichi Hachiya; Tomoko Suzuki; Yuka Harada
- Written by: Yūko Kakihara
- Music by: Motoyoshi Iwasaki
- Studio: AIC A.S.T.A.
- Licensed by: Crunchyroll (Note: North America and Australia only): NA: Funimation; UK: MVM Entertainment
- Original network: TV Saitama, Chiba TV, KBS Kyoto, tvk, Sun Television, TVQ, Tokyo MX, TV Aichi
- English network: US: Funimation Channel
- Original run: October 4, 2009 – December 27, 2009
- Episodes: 13 + OVA
- Light novel
- Written by: Rin Kanzaki
- Illustrated by: Suu Minazuki
- Published by: Kadokawa Shoten
- Imprint: Kadokawa Sneaker Bunko
- Published: February 1, 2010
- Video game

Sora no Otoshimono: Heart-Throbbing Summer Vacation
- Developer: Kadokawa Shoten
- Platform: PlayStation Portable
- Released: March 25, 2010
- Light novel

Sora no Otoshimono f
- Written by: Ayun Tachibana
- Illustrated by: Suu Minazuki
- Published by: Kadokawa Shoten
- Imprint: Kadokawa Sneaker Bunko
- Published: October 1, 2010
- Anime television series

Heaven's Lost Property: Forte
- Directed by: Hisashi Saitō
- Produced by: Seiichi Hachiya; Tomoko Suzuki; Yoshikazu Kumagai; Tomomi Numata
- Written by: Yūko Kakihara
- Music by: Motoyoshi Iwasaki
- Studio: AIC A.S.T.A.
- Licensed by: Crunchyroll
- Original network: TV Saitama, Chiba TV, KBS Kyoto, tvk, Sun Television, TVQ Kyushu Broadcasting, Tokyo MX, TV Aichi
- English network: US: Funimation Channel
- Original run: October 1, 2010 – December 17, 2010
- Episodes: 12
- Other
- Heaven's Lost Property the Movie: The Angeloid of Clockwork (film); Sora no Otoshimono Forte: Dreamy Season (game); Heaven's Lost Property Final – The Movie: Eternally My Master (film)
- icon

Heaven's Lost Property (Japanese: そらのおとしもの, Hepburn: Sora no Otoshimono; lit., "Lost Property of the Sky" or "Misplaced by Heaven"), is a Japanese manga series written and illustrated by Suu Minazuki. The plot revolves around Tomoki Sakurai, a boy who desires to live a peaceful life but encounters a fallen girl with wings, named Ikaros, who becomes his servant.

The manga began monthly serialization in the May 2007 issue of manga magazine Shōnen Ace and concluded with the March 2014 issue. The first tankōbon was released by Kadokawa Shoten on September 26, 2007, with a total of 20 volumes released. An anime adaptation produced by AIC aired in Japan in 2009, followed with a second season, a feature film, and two video games. A second film was released in Japan on April 26, 2014. The anime is licensed in North America and Australia for home video and streaming by Funimation, which is now known as Crunchyroll, LLC.

== Plot ==
Tomoki Sakurai is a very perverted teenage boy whose motto is "Peace and quiet are the best", and often has dreams of meeting an angel. He finds it difficult to live in comfort when he has to put up with Sohara Mitsuki, his next-door neighbor with a killer karate chop; Eishiro Sugata, an eccentric pseudo-scientist bent on discovering the "New World"; and Mikako Satsukitane, their school's sadistic student council president. One night, while he was witnessing a strange anomaly in the sky, a UMA (Unidentified Mysterious Animal) crash-landed nearby. Tomoki discovers that what fell from the sky is a winged female humanoid named Ikaros from an unknown world of Synapse, who soon declares herself to be Tomoki's servant. From then on, more creatures known as "Angeloids" arrive; with this, he loses his peace and quiet, but at the same time finds pleasant things the Angeloids bring him, and fight the forces that fall upon Earth.

== Characters ==
=== Main ===
Tomoki Sakurai (桜井 智樹, Sakurai Tomoki)
Voiced by: Soichiro Hoshi (Japanese); Greg Ayres (English)
Tomoki is a teenage boy^{[ch. 20]} who wants nothing more than a peaceful and quiet life in Sorami City. He has had recurring dreams of meeting an angel since childhood.^{[ch. 1]} Despite being a shameless pervert, a trait heavily influenced by his grandfather and mother,^{[ch. 7,33,36,49]} Tomoki is described as a kind and sincere person. He strives to make Ikaros and the resident Angeloids behave more like humans by having them not be so focused on obedience, and telling them to make their own decisions.^{[ch. 9]} He is usually drawn in chibi parameters, except when he is serious or relaxed. Tomoki occasionally uses a device that transforms him into a girl named Tomoko (智子).^{[ch. 11,33]}
Ikaros (イカロス, Ikarosu)
Voiced by: Saori Hayami (Japanese); Brittney Karbowski (English)
The title character and main heroine of the series, Ikaros is a beautiful gynoid known as an Angeloid. (Note: Angeloids (エンジェロイド, Enjeroido) are a series of gynoids from Synapse that have wings like Angels. They are programmed to serve their masters using a process called "imprinting", represented by neck collar and chain that extends to her chosen master's hand.^{[ch. 3]} Each Angeloid is designated with a letter of the Greek alphabet, and can be programmed with abilities and powers that are a function of three main parameters: battle capability, emotional control and processing capability. The Angeloids' names, weapons, and abilities are primarily derived from Greek gods and mythological figures.) She falls from the sky at the beginning of the story. After Tomoki recovers her, she forms a bond with him and calls him master: the imprinting is symbolized by a chain from her collar to his hand.^{[ch. 1]} She has an expressionless face that makes the other characters wonder if she will ever smile.^{[ch. 14,15]} Her emotions develop slowly, due to her programmed setting of high battle abilities and high processing abilities but low emotional abilities.^{[ch. 22]} Despite this, she develops genuine feelings of love for Tomoki. She also goes along with any of his perverted schemes,^{[ch. 2,16]} and eventually burns up into nothing after carrying Tomoki to Synapse, showing him her smile for the first time.^{[ch. 76]} She and the others are later resurrected by Tomoki's final wish.^{[ch. 77]} Although she initially states she is a "Pet-Class" (entertainment-purposed) Angeloid, she is actually a "Strategic Battle-Class" Angeloid.^{[ch. 10]} In her previous visit to Earth as the Uranus Queen (Note: 空の女王 (ウラヌス・クイーン), Uranusu Kuīn), she destroys the Tower of Babel.^{[ch. 10]} In "Battle Mode", she employs: Aegis (Note: イージス, Ījisu), an energy shield sphere; Artemis (Note: アルテミス, Arutemisu), which fires an array of energy projectiles from her wings; and Apollon (アポロン, Aporon, from the Greek Apollyon), a bow that fires an arrow of mass destruction.^{[ch. 10,15]} In Uranus Queen mode, she can interface with massive weapons platform called the Uranus System (Hephastus System in the Funimation dub). In a later battle, she evolves into Ikaros Version II with "Dual Variable Wings" that boost her power.^{[ch. 55,56]} Her name comes from the Greek mythological character Icarus, a craftman's son who flew too close to the sun and fell from the sky.
Sohara Mitsuki (見月 そはら, Mitsuki Sohara)
Voiced by: Mina (Japanese); Trina Nishimura (English)
Sohara is Tomoki's next door neighbor and childhood best friend.^{[ch. 1,7]} She gets annoyed whenever Tomoki acts in a lecherous manner and typically punishes him with a single karate chop.^{[ch. 1]} As a child, she was constantly ill and only had Tomoki as a friend. Despite all the punishment she dishes out to him, she secretly loves him,^{[vol. 6:EX-1]} and has embarrassing lustful dreams about him.^{[ch. 18]}. She is good at sports,^{[ch. 19,23]} but struggles heavily with English (Spanish in the Funimation dub),^{[ch. 12,26]} and is a deadly cook when it comes to sunny-side up eggs.^{[ch. 41,51]} Eventually, Daedalus reveals that she created Sohara: the girl who died from a childhood illness was Daedalus's original avatar, and the girl who grew up with Tomoki was a clone she made so that he would not forget her.^{[ch. 77]}
Eishiro Sugata (守形 英四郎, Sugata Eishirō)
Voiced by: Tatsuhisa Suzuki (Japanese); Eric Vale (English)
Sugata is the leader of the New World Discovery Club (新大陸発見部, Shin Tairiku Hakkenbu; Also "New Continent Discovery Club") at Tomoki's school.^{[ch. 11]} He is an eccentric explorer and scientist who enjoys hang-gliding and living in the wilderness.^{[ch. 5]} In the anime, he opens the episodes with some philosophical narrations which reference historical explorers such as Magellan and Columbus. He is best friends with Mikako Satsukitane, even though her constant sexual advances towards him irritate him beyond belief.^{[ch. 8,26]} He behaves in a generally deadpan manner unless it involves the "New World",^{[ch. 11,50]} or his family background.^{[ch. 58,59]} Prior to the events of the series, he is the son of a renowned political family. When his elder brother died from a hang-gliding accident, Eishiro takes blame and is disowned by his family.^{[ch. 67]} Leaving his younger brother the sole heir. Since then he has followed his elder brother's footsteps in discovering a "New World" as a way of atoning for his misdeed.
Mikako Satsukitane (五月田根 美香子, Satsukitane Mikako)
Voiced by: Ayahi Takagaki (Japanese); Jamie Marchi (English)
Mikako is an upperclassman to Tomoki and Mitsuki and the student body president. She is a childhood friend of Sugata, whom she calls "Ei-kun", and is the daughter of an influential yakuza boss in Sorami.^{[ch. 8]} She is manipulative, cunning, highly intelligent, athletic and sadistic.^{[ch. 19,26]} She initiates many schemes in the form of festival competitions that place Tomoki in humiliating situations for her amusement. Unlike Sohara and the Angeloids, she directs her romantic affections towards Sugata,^{[ch. 49]} and claims him during the mock wedding in the second anime season finale.
Nymph (ニンフ, Ninfu)
Voiced by: Iori Nomizu (Japanese); Kara Edwards (English)
Nymph is an "Electronic Warfare Angeloid, Type Beta" (電子戦用エンジェロイドタイプβ（ベータ）). She is introduced when she finds Ikaros on an errand and attacks her^{[ch. 9]}, then later mysteriously appears in Tomoki's living room where she casually snacks on chips.^{[ch. 13]} She has a condescending attitude towards humans, whom she refers to as "bugs", and she calls Angeloids by their types rather than their names. For example, she calls Ikaros "Alpha".^{[ch. 10,13]} Despite the attitude, she starts enjoying everyday life and her favorite hobby is eating snacks and watching soap operas.^{[ch. 20]}
Nymph's original mission was to retrieve Ikaros and return her to Synapse, however, she is physically weaker than her and fails in the mission after awakening Ikaros's Uranus Queen ability,^{[ch. 10]} and is consequently heavily punished and abused.^{[ch. 12,13]} After spending time with Tomoki and his friends, she begins to like humans, and soon develops feelings for Tomoki, albeit in an aloof fashion.^{[ch. 13,16,20]} Nymph eventually betrays Synapse: in the manga she tries to surprise attack the Harpies, while in the anime she sides with Ikaros. In both cases, her wings are consequently ripped off by the Harpies, but Tomoki and friends manage to free her from her link to her master.^{[ch. 15]} The wings regenerate when she accepts Tomoki as her new master.^{[ch. 31]} After the regrowth, Nymph needs to go through an Imprinting process required for her master;^{[ch. 34]} she eventually asks Tomoki, but he refuses and states that he wants her to live freely.^{[ch. 39]}
As an Electronic Warfare-type Angeloid, Nymph's allocation of abilities emphasize her high processing capabilities and high emotional control, but her raw battle power is set low.^{[ch. 22]} Nymph is able to hack computer systems as well as other Angeloids^{[ch. 10]} and even humans.^{[ch. 25,27]} She uses a device called the Dive Game which enables humans to enter each other's dreams and through Tomoki's dream, visit Synapse.^{[ch. 18]} Her "Stealth" wings appear sheer, unlike Ikaros's wings which can only retract to stubs, and she can use them as a radar.^{[ch. 13,4]}^{[vol. 6:chapter EX]} She can also fire a high-powered energy beam from her mouth called "Paradise Song" (Note: パラダイスソング, Paradaisu Songu).^{[ch. 15]} During the battle with Angeloid Hiyori, Tomoki's encouragement allows her to upgrade her powers to Aphrodite (Note: アフロディーテ, Afurodīte), a "fundamental particle-jamming system" that she uses to hack and free Hiyori.^{[ch. 40]} She eventually faces Minos and self-destructs to destroy Zeus.^{[ch. 76]}
Nymph is named after and based on the nature spirits of Greek myth.
Astraea (アストレア, Asutorea)
Voiced by: Kaori Fukuhara (Japanese); Carli Mosier (English)
Astraea is a large-breasted "Local-Combat Angeloid, Type Delta" (局地戦闘用エンジェロイドタイプΔ（デルタ）) sent by Synapse to kill Tomoki. She is strong in combat and emotion compared to Ikaros, but because of that allocation, her weakness is her low processing power, and the other Angeloids consider her an idiot; this is affirmed when she bungles her multiple chances to kill Tomoki at the Buddhist temple, and later at the quiz show where she fails basic questions such as "what is 1+1"^{[ch. 22,26]}. She is often famished because she does not know how to hunt or to obtain food by her own means; in one episode, she eats Sugata's fish bait^{[ch. 28]}. After spending time with Tomoki, she refuses Master's order to kill Nymph, and severs her own chain.^{[ch. 30-31]}
Astraea has a good relationship with her senpai sisters. Astraea eventually realizes that she too has fallen in love with Tomoki, after Chaos questions her on the definition of love.^{[ch. 30,31,48]} In recent chapters, she becomes depressed from losing her weapon and shield, but is encouraged by Tomoki who tells her only she can decide whether or not she is useless. She then decides to rescue her younger sister, Chaos.^{[ch. 60]}
According to Daedalus, Astraea is extremely quick and has great close-combat capabilities but is vulnerable to long-range attacks. She wields a super-oscillating photon blade called Chrysaor (Note: クリサオル, Kurisaoru), which can even penetrate Ikaros's Aegis defense system. For defense, she uses Aegis L (イージス L, Ījisu Eru; "L" stands for "left", as it appears on her left arm), a shield that is more powerful than Ikaros's version, but guards a limited angle and can only be deployed for a short period.^{[ch. 31]} However, in her fight with Ikaros Melan, Astraea's sword and shield are destroyed.^{[ch. 56,60]} Towards the end of the story, she battles Chaos where she evolves her weapon and shield, and they both are killed.^{[ch. 75]}
Astraea is named after the ancient Greek goddess Astraea, who was a goddess of justice that later became the constellations Virgo and Libra.
Hiyori Kazane (風音 日和, Kazane Hiyori)
Voiced by: Yōko Hikasa (Japanese); Colleen Clinkenbeard (English)
Hiyori is a second-year student at Tomoki's school whose story is detailed in Heaven's Lost Property the Movie: The Angeloid of Clockwork. She is deeply in love with Tomoki and joins the New World Discovery Club in order to get closer to him; however, it is implied he doesn't feel the same way for her, and only sees her as a friend.^{[ch. 34]} In reality, Hiyori is an Angel who was first seen inside some sort of sleeping chamber when Sugata went to Synapse. The chamber connects her to her body on Earth, which functions like an avatar.^{[ch. 24]} Sugata is hesitant in letting her join his club, but welcomes her upon hearing the club would receive more funding. Tomoki puts Hiyori through a false initiation to assess her purity. Thus far, only Sugata, Nymph, and Ikaros are aware of Hiyori's true identity.^{[ch. 35,38]}
Hiyori gets rather embarrassed when it is suggested that she and Tomoki are an item; while she likes Tomoki, she has not considered dating him yet, and her presence becomes a source of major discomfort for Sohara, Nymph, and Astraea. This stems from the realization that Hiyori is always kind and caring to Tomoki, while the others seem to only see his "faults".^{[ch. 36]} Eventually, Hiyori manages to confess her feelings to Tomoki, which leaves him in shock as no girl has ever confessed to him before, but he isn't sure how to feel about it. However, her time with Tomoki is ultimately cut short when a sleepy truck driver runs her over, which causes her avatar to disappear and her existence to be erased from everyone's memories (except for Tomoki and the Angeloids).^{[ch. 36-38]}
Hiyori is later converted to a "Type Zeta" Angeloid who works for the Master of Synapse to destroy the city. She uses a staff, called Demeter (Note: デメテル, Demeteru), which has the power to manipulate the weather by changing the air pressure, and thus knocking people unconscious. She is also able to counter-hack Nymph, but eventually loses when Nymph evolves into Aphrodite mode. After she is freed from Master, Hiyori remains on Earth and quits the New World Discovery Club. As she has accomplished her goal of getting close and confessing her love to Tomoki, she leaves him with a farewell kiss,^{[ch. 40]} although she continues to harbor feelings for Tomoki.^{[ch. 61]} She later gives Chaos the ability to fully grasp emotions, at the cost of her own life.^{[ch. 70]} It is unknown if Tomoki ever reciprocated her feelings.

=== Synapse ===
Synapse (シナプス, Shinapusu) is a land located in the skies that is home to the Angels and the Angeloids. It was first introduced in the series as a black hole above Sorami. Nymph has a device called the Dive Game that creates a portal between Sorami and Synapse via Tomoki's dreams. In the Synapse, there is a large dome that contains numerous Angels in sleeping pods, which connects them to their real-world avatars. If the avatar in the real world is killed, the people associated with them will have their memories erased, such as the case with Hiyori. Also in the Synapse is a large obelisk^{[ch. 2,18,24]} called the Rule which grants people wishes and creates the cards that the Angeloids use.^{[ch. 77]}

Daedalus (ダイダロス, Daidarosu)
Voiced by: Asuka Ōgame (Japanese); Monica Rial (English)
Daedalus is an angel that frequently appears in Tomoki's dreams, but she flies away, which makes Tomoki cry. She comes to his dreams and asks him to help save her, and later sent Ikaros to him from the sky. It appears that she greatly cares for Tomoki. Her name originates from the Greek mythological character Daedalus, the father of Icarus. Her face is obscured in all of her appearances.^{[ch. 1,18]} It is later revealed she's the creator of the first generation of Angeloids: Ikaros, Nymph, the Harpies, and Astraea.^{[ch. 26]} She helps Sugata when he visits Synapse.^{[ch. 29,30]} She eventually reveals to Tomoki that she is in fact the real Sohara. The other Sohara was her incarnations: the child Sohara was her avatar that died from sickness (similar to Hiyori's case), and that the Sohara who grew up with him was a healthy replica to watch over him afterwards. In addition to creating the Angeloids, she created the "Rule" obelisk that grants wishes and the cards that go with it.^{[ch. 77]}
Master of Synapse (空(シナプス)のマスター, Shinapusu no Masutā)
Voiced by: Shinichiro Miki (Japanese); Mike McFarland (Sky Master) (English)
The sadistic and ruthless ruler of Synapse, Master enjoys torturing the Angeloids he owns (both physically and emotionally); he sees them as merely his playthings which he can do as he pleases, and discard as trash. He is condescending towards humans, and refers to them as "Downers", a trait that is also shared with his Angeloids. Because of his arrogance and belief that the Angeloids will always obey his orders, he is surprised when he witnesses one of them break their chain or go against his orders. He is usually seated at a throne with two Angeloids beside him. Like Daedalus, his face is mostly obscured in his appearances.^{[ch. 12-15]} He also creates an "Ultimate Air Defense System" called Zeus (Note: ゼウス, Zeusu).^{[ch. 47]} His real name is later revealed to be Minos (Note: ミノス, Minosu)^{[ch. 68]}, named after the king of Crete in Greek mythology. In the final chapter of the series, Tomoki punches him with the strength of the Angeloids' core. As Minos stabs himself, Tomoki advises him that he should try coming to Earth.^{[ch. 77]}
Harpies (ハーピー, Hāpī)
Voiced by: Michiko Neya (Harpy 1), Maya Okamoto (Harpy 2) (Japanese); Clarine Harp (Harpy), Stephanie Young (Gamma) (Note: In the Funimation dub, one of the duo is named Harpy and the other is named Gamma.) (English)
A pair of "Interceptor Angeloids, Type Gamma" (要撃用エンジェロイドタイプγ), who answer directly to the Master of Synapse. They are responsible for tearing off Nymph's wings^{[ch. 15]} and are also guards at Synapse's lab.^{[ch. 18,26,29]} They are equipped with a "High-Fever Object Compression Anti-Aircraft Gun" on their left arm called Prometheus (プロメテウス, Purometeusu), which fires white-hot projectiles of 3,000 °C (5,430 °F) at 4 kilometres per second (8,900 mph),^{[ch. 15]} and a "Super Vibration Claw" called Nemea (ネメア) mounted on their right arm.^{[ch. 62]} They are named and modeled after the harpies of Greek mythology. After Master orders them to attack Ikaros for his amusement, but they are interrupted by Tomoki, who tells them to dress up; the younger is embarrassed, but the older plays along until they get to a bikini where she becomes extremely conscious about showing her belly button that she flees.^{[ch. 62]} Later at the beach, the older harpy discovers she cannot survive being underwater, but was rescued by Tomoki and friends.^{[ch. 63]} After she and Tomoki were stranded in a desert^{[ch. 64]}, the older harpy develops feelings for him and questions her mission.^{[ch. 64]} The younger harpy decides to continue the mission; she fights Ikaros on her own, until the older harpy rejoins her.^{[ch. 65,66]} They eventually force themselves inside Ikaros's Aegis shield and self-destruct by detonating their collars.^{[ch. 66]} This causes the Master of Synapse great distress,^{[ch. 66]} and causes Tomoki to lock himself in his room in depression.^{[ch. 67]}
Chaos (カオス, Kaosu)
Voiced by: Aki Toyosaki (Japanese); Carrie Savage (English)
Chaos is a "Second-Generation Angeloid, Type Epsilon" (第二世代エンジェロイドタイプε, Dainisedai Enjeroido, Taipu Epushiron) and a major antagonist of the series. She initially appears to Tomoki as a girl in a nun's outfit.^{[ch. 28]} Chaos can change her appearance to mimic someone dear to her victim in order to instill turmoil and confusion (as her name implies), as she did against Nymph (and Ikaros) by taking on the likeness of Tomoki.^{[ch. 29]} Her "wings" are a wicked array of bladed, almost organic-like appendages. Unlike the first generation Angeloids who lack the ability to sleep, Chaos can enter another person's dream, as she has initially done with Tomoki. Chaos has a strange obsession with love, often asking the person what love is, to which Ikaros responded that love, for her, was a sensation of pain in her reactor, obviously in a figurative sense.^{[ch. 31]}
Chaos's first mission is to retrieve Ikaros' core. She lures Nymph by deceptively posing as Tomoki and then orders her to kill herself.^{[ch. 29]} She also fights and defeats the other first generation Angeloids, except for Ikaros who sends Chaos into an ocean chasm where she was temporarily incapacitated due to the great water pressure.^{[ch. 31]} While there, she concludes that love equates to pain. Chaos was left in the abyss, where she dismembers and devours fish to "grow bigger" and "to show her 'love' to everyone". She easily devours Seiren, one of the Sky Master's Angeloids, and uses the Pandora program to evolve into Chaos Version 2.^{[ch. 45,47]} She continues to question love by following Tomoki around a bit, but returns to her master only to be shot down by the Zeus cannon, and after overhearing Tomoki tell his Angeloids to go away, decides to return to the ocean floor to express her love more.^{[ch. 47]} She later returns to devour the dark Angeloids; she acquires their powers, yet holds back from attacking Tomoki because of her feelings for him, and her desire to be accepted by him as a "good girl".^{[ch. 56]} She retreats to the ocean.^{[ch. 56,60]}
Chaos later returns to absorb Hiyori.^{[ch. 69]} She gains a small understanding of right and wrong, and is directed by Hiyori to kiss Tomoki.^{[ch. 69]} She visits Tomoki and reveals herself to be an Angeloid,^{[ch. 70]} but their conversation is interrupted by Nymph, who had discovered Hiyori's body thinking she killed her. In the ensuing fight, Tomoki steps in the way of Chaos' wing and is impaled in the back. Chaos retreats to the river bank with a desire to "start it all over" when she encounters Sugata.^{[ch. 71]} After using too much of her powers, Chaos' body explodes, taking Astraea with her.^{[ch. 75]} After Tomoki resurrects everyone, Tomoki welcomes Chaos to his household, where she finally realizes what love is.^{[ch. 77]}
In the Sora no Otoshimono: Forte anime, after Chaos is plunged into the sea, she emerges as an adult and fights Nymph and Astraea; she easily overpowers them, until Ikaros arrives. She was later defeated by Astraea and Ikaros, who use their upgraded weapons (courtesy of Nymph) and briefly shuts down, after which Tomoki installs on her chain a padlock device given to him by Daedalus, who then restores Chaos to her child form. Chaos then joins the cast as the newest resident of Tomoki's household.
Oregano (オレガノ)
Oregano, also known as "Mini-Ikaros" (ミニイカロス, Mini-Ikarosu), is one of the mass-produced Medical Specialist Angeloids (医療用エンジェロイドタイプ) from a village in Synapse who mysteriously manages to come to Earth by tagging along with Eishiro when he teleports back from one of his trips.^{[ch. 51]} She seems to have common sense with Tomoki. Mikako takes her in afterwards (even giving her the ability to speak, a first since her Angeloid type are usually mute), as Tomoki does not have enough money to support another Angeloid. While Tomoki and Nymph are initially concerned that Mikako would abuse Oregano, they find her initially generally courteous and well-mannered, that is, until Tomoki leaves; then Oregano acts particularly vicious to Nymph by serving her vile food, insulting her, and trapping her in a cell full of ecchi animals (frogs licking, eels squirming) while dumping a bunch of grenades on her, all the while spinning the situations as if it were all Nymph's fault.^{[ch. 52]} She later reveals that Nymph used to visit her village and forced everyone to listen to her horrible singing, explaining why Oregano greatly dislikes her.^{[ch. 60]} She prefers to hang out with people (like Tomoki) who desire peace and quiet.
Ikaros Melan (イカロス = メラン, Ikarosu Meran; Ίκαρος Μέλαν)
Ikaros Melan, or "Black Ikaros", is a "Tactical Angeloid, Type Theta" (戦略エンジェロイドタイプθ（シータ）) is introduced as a dark winged copy of Ikaros that possesses a Variable Wing core designed by the Master of Synapse. As a Second-Generation Angeloid, Ikaros Melan is stronger than her original: Astraea's Chrysaor breaks on her Aegis shield, and her counter-punch breaks Astraea's Aegis L shield. Ikaros Melan is eventually destroyed when the real Ikaros is hit with Ikaros Melan's Apollon arrow, after which Ikaros traps both in her Aegis shield just before the arrow explodes. She and the other dark Angeloids are then consumed by Chaos.^{[ch. 54-56]}. However, a group of Ikaros Melans were seen attacking Yoshitsune Hououin when he accidentally found himself in Synapse.^{[ch. 68]} Minos has since generated an army of melan angeloids to guard Synapse. Some of his Melan angeloids are modeled after Nymph and Astraea.^{[ch. 55, page 24]}
Seiren (セイレーン, Sirēn)
Seiren is an "Underwater Warfare Angeloid", able to swim in water as deep as 8000 meters (26,246 feet). She is based on the sirens from the Greek mythology, and was designed by the Master of Synapse. Her appearance in the manga is brief, as when she attacks Tomoki, Chaos suddenly appears and consumed her.^{[ch. 45]}

=== Humans ===
Tomozo Sakurai (桜井 智蔵, Sakurai Tomozō)
Voiced by: Hiroshi Iwasaki (Japanese); Bill Flynn (English)
Tomoki's equally perverted grandfather, whose dream was to sleep with every woman in the world, but could not do so before his death.^{[ch. 18]} He usually appears when Tomoki is in a dire situation, usually as a flashback or some supernatural phenomenon, to give him albeit perverted advice.^{[ch. 7,18,22,33]} The manga features a recurring gag where Tomoki (and sometimes a friend) would be killed after doing something perverted; grandpa would meet them in the afterlife and tell them to "go home" (back to life).^{[ch. 27,41,58]}
Tomoyo Sakurai (桜井 智代, Sakurai Tomoyo)
Tomoki's perverted mother; her appearance resembles Tomoki's female alter ego, Tomoko. Tomoyo and her husband left Tomoki on a "world tour" when he was only 10 years old, prior to the series' start. When she reunites with her son, she harasses Astraea and some of the other girls by fondling their breasts, and then flirts with Sugata, which enrages Mikako. She is finally stopped by her husband and then resumes her world tour with him.^{[ch. 49]}
Tsutsumi Sakurai (桜井 つつみ, Sakurai Tsutsumi)
Tomoki's father who briefly appears at the end of chapter 49 of the manga. Tsutsumi is very much like Sohara in that he packs a powerful karate chop that he uses on his wife for her pervertedness. Tsutsumi was actually married into the Sakurai family, while Tomoyo is the descendant of the Sakurai bloodline.^{[ch. 49]}
Yoshitsune Hououin (鳳凰院 義経, Hōōin Yoshitsune) and Tsukino Hououin (鳳凰院 月乃, Hōōin Tsukino)
Yoshitsune Voiced by: Shinji Kawada (Japanese); J. Michael Tatum (English)
Tsukino Voiced by: Minako Kotobuki (Japanese); Cherami Leigh (English)
Yoshitsune Hououin is the guy from the rival school that competes against Tomoki's school during the cultural festivals.^{[ch. 21,44]} He comes from a wealthy family, although, in a public showdown against Mikako, his fortune cannot rival Mikako's "black money". Tsukino is his little sister who always looks up to him, that is, until Yoshitsune acts like a pervert by flipping a girl's skirt. Tomoki and friends try to help him reconcile with his sister while still acting like a man. He also notices that Sugata is hiding something about his past.^{[ch. 58]} He later sacrifices himself to the Ikaros Melans to protect Sugata when he is in Synapse.^{[ch. 73]}
Zero / Judas
Voiced by: Jūrōta Kosugi (Japanese); Christopher Sabat (English)
A mysterious visitor who minds a pigeon-covered booth that bears the name JUDAS. He regularly appears during the Satsukitane festivals to foil any chances Tomoki has of winning the event; he usually overpowers him with his pair of pistols. He is directly based on the title character in the Judas manga that Minazuki worked on prior to this series.^{[ch. 19]} In the manga, he is never mentioned by name, but in the anime he is credited by Shooting Range Man or Zero in the Japanese dub, and Judas in the English dub.

== Production ==
In 2006, Suu Minazuki's previous manga Judas had ceased publication in Kadokawa Shoten's Shōnen Ace magazine with a total of five volumes. Minazuki had also wrapped up his fantasy harem comedy series Watashi no Messiah-sama in 2007, for which he started a sequel Watashi no Kyūseishu-sama ~lacrima~ which ran for 35 chapters in Monthly GFantasy in 2007–2008. These works were set in fantasy worlds with some references to Biblical characters and settings; Minazuki briefly alludes to the Tower of Babel in the history of the Angeloids.^{[ch. 10]} Minazuki's Angeloid characters and weapons in Sora no Otoshimono are primarily named after characters in Greek mythology, including their classifications sequentially pulled from the Greek alphabet.

In 2008, Minazuki started a seinen water adventure series called Seven Ocean, but only six chapters were published. As the publication of Sora no Otoshimono was geared for a wider shōnen audience, Minazuki made some adjustments such as posting warnings to his readers to skip the chapter when it contains obvious nudity themes, and placing censor boxes and ovals over exposed body parts.^{[ch. 11,33]} Yoshihiro Watanabe, who worked on Brighter than the Dawning Blue and Bamboo Blade handled the Character Design and served as the Chief Animation Director for the first anime series. Hisashi Saito, who also directed Bamboo Blade, handled the Direction for the anime series as well as the OVA and the feature film.

== Media ==
=== Manga ===
Heaven's Lost Property began monthly serialization in the May 2007 issue of Shōnen Ace sold on March 26, 2007, and concluded with the March 2014 issue sold on January 26, 2014. The first tankōbon was released by Kadokawa Shoten on September 26, 2007, with a total of 20 tankōbon released in Japan. Chapter titles are often suffixed with two exclamation points.

In addition, a four-panel comic, titled Sora no Otoshimono Pico (そらのおとしものPICO, Sora no Otoshimono Piko), illustrated by ms, was developed and published in the inaugural issue of Kadokawa Shoten's 4-Koma Nano Ace magazine (published on March 9, 2011), and continued in Shōnen Ace until its conclusion on March 26, 2011. It focuses on the lives of Astraea, Nymph, and Ikaros.

=== Anime ===
An anime adaptation produced by AIC and directed by Hisashi Saitō aired in Japan from October 4 to December 27, 2009, on TV Saitama and Chiba TV, with subsequent broadcasts on KBS, tvk, Sun Television, TVQ, Tokyo MX and TV Aichi, with English-subtitled simulcasts provided on the Crunchyroll. Seven DVD compilation volumes were released between December 25, 2009, and June 25, 2010, by Kadokawa Pictures, with limited edition volumes also sold. A Blu-ray box set was released on June 24, 2011. An OVA episode entitled "Project Pink" was bundled with the limited edition release of volume 9 of the manga on DVD on September 9, 2010.

A second season, Sora no Otoshimono: Forte (そらのおとしもの（フォルテ）), was announced on reprinted copies of the manga, and aired 12 episodes between October 1 to December 17, 2010, with simulcasts provided by Crunchyroll, as with the first season. Six DVD volumes were released by Kadokawa Pictures between December 24, 2010, and May 27, 2011.

The opening theme for the first season is "Ring My Bell", and for the second season, it is "Heart no Kakuritsu" (ハートの確率, Hāto no Kakuritsu; "Probabilities of the Heart"); both are performed by Blue Drops and feature singers Hitomi Yoshida and Ikaros (Saori Hayami). Both seasons also use different ending themes for each episode.

Both seasons of the anime are licensed in North America by Funimation Entertainment, which released them under the respective titles of Heaven's Lost Property and Heaven's Lost Property: Forte. The first season was released on December 20, 2011, on DVD and Blu-ray. However, due to concerns from the Japanese licensing company regarding Blu-ray sales, the second season was released only as a 2-disc DVD set in North America on March 20, 2012. The second season was released on Blu-ray on June 25, 2013.

==== Films ====
A film adaptation called Sora no Otoshimono the Movie: The Angeloid of Clockwork (劇場版 そらのおとしもの 時計じかけの哀女神（エンジェロイド）, Gekijōban Sora no Otoshimono: Tokei-jikake no Enjeroido) was announced by Kadokawa Shoten in November 2010. The film focuses on the Hiyori arc of the manga. A 30-second teaser trailer was shown in the post-end credits of the final episode of Forte. The film premiered in Japanese theaters on June 25, 2011. Funimation Entertainment licensed the film under the title of Heaven's Lost Property the Movie: The Angeloid of Clockwork, and released it on February 26, 2013. A second film called Heaven's Lost Property Final – The Movie: Eternally My Master was released on April 26, 2014.

=== Other media ===
A light novel adaptation of Heaven's Lost Property written by Rin Kazaki and illustrated by Minazuki was released by Kadokawa Shoten on February 1, 2010, under its Kadokawa Sneaker Bunko imprint. A sequel to the light novel called Sora no Otoshimono f, written by Rin Kanzaki and illustrated by Minazuki and Ayun Tachibana, was released on October 1, 2010.

A video game developed by Kadokawa Shoten called Sora no Otoshimono: Heart-Throbbing Summer Vacation (そらのおとしもの ドキドキサマーバケーション, Sora no Otoshimono Dokidoki Samā Bakēshon) was released for the PlayStation Portable on March 25, 2010, featuring character interactions and mini-game puzzles. Another game developed by Kadokawa Shoten called Sora no Otoshimono Forte: Dreamy Season (そらのおとしものf (フォルテ) Dreamy Season, Sora no Otoshimono Forute Dorīmī Shīzun) was released for the Nintendo DS on January 27, 2011, with gameplay of a visual novel plus some mildly sexually suggestive mini-games.

Several types of merchandise have been produced based primarily on the female characters of Sora no Otoshimono; they include: figurines, T-shirts, keychains, and body pillows. "Oppai" Mouse pads were also produced; the one of Ikaros became the subject of a bonus chapter.^{[vol. 10:extra]}

== Reception ==
Tim Jones of T.H.E.M. Anime Reviews stated that the anime show "Dangles between the line of guilty pleasure and stupid, but manages to be an entertaining series all the same." and is actually funny in comparison to DearS, with "decent fanservice, amusing characters, and doesn't revolve entirely around subservient alien girls", however, he is critical of the tacked on fanservice, and dislikes Mikako's terrible character, "basically a two-faced bitch" whose smirks imply a "mean-spirited, unfunny joke coming out of her mouth." Chris Beveridge of Mania.com wrote that the second anime series "provides the kind of humor that's good to have once in awhile [sic] and certainly not what I want out of a lot of series, but the staff here has hit just about everything right (outside of that awful wrestling episode)." Theron Martin of Anime News Network wrote that the second series was sporadically enjoyable, with much of the attempts at humor and fanservice to be abysmally poor, although he enjoyed the English dub's voice work. Dennis Amith of J!-ENT considered the series "Intriguingly perverse, reminiscent of Urusei Yatsura and Chobits" and appealing to harem and fan service anime fans, but "enjoyed with every episode, the voice talent singing songs via anime theme songs from the '70s, '80′s and modern-style themes".

Following the anime episode ending that involved flying panties, Rocket Girls creator Hōsuke Nojiri created a rubber band powered ornithopter in the shape of the panties, and posted the video on Nico Nico Douga where it soon became popular. NKH (Niconico's live streaming station) and a local school (Niconico Technical Community) then hosted a Sora Fes event on March 6, 2010, where participants built and flew model airplanes in the likeness of the flying panties. Nojiri, along with OpenSky's media artist Kazuhiko Hachiya, director Hisashi Saito, and TBS announcer Jun Suzuki also attended the event. With the broadcast of the Sora No Otoshimono Forte anime season, the January 2011 issue of Newtype featured Ikaros as the most popular female character, with Nymph at No. 7 and Astraea at No. 9. Tomoki Sakurai was also listed as number 5 for most popular male character in that month. Streaming broadcaster Crunchyroll reported that Sora No Otoshimono Forte ranked No. 3 in popularity of their top 10 anime broadcasts in the Fall of 2010.

== Works cited ==
Sora no Otoshimono manga volumes by Suu Minazuki. Original Japanese version published by Kadokawa Shoten.

1. Vol. 1 (ch. 1–4): そらのおとしもの (1). September 26, 2007 ISBN 978-4-04-713973-2 (in Japanese).
2. Vol. 2 (ch. 5–9): そらのおとしもの (2). December 26, 2007 ISBN 978-4-04-715013-3 (in Japanese).
3. Vol. 3 (ch. 10–14): そらのおとしもの (3). July 26, 2008 ISBN 978-4-04-715079-9 (in Japanese).
4. Vol. 4 (ch. 15–18): そらのおとしもの (4). January 26, 2009 ISBN 978-4-04-715164-2 (in Japanese).
5. Vol. 5 (ch. 19–22): そらのおとしもの (5). April 25, 2009 ISBN 978-4-04-715228-1 (in Japanese).
6. Vol. 6 (ch. 23–26): そらのおとしもの (6). September 26, 2009 ISBN 978-4-04-715292-2 (in Japanese).
7. Vol. 7 (ch. 27–30): そらのおとしもの (7). October 26, 2009 ISBN 978-4-04-715301-1 (in Japanese).
8. Vol. 8 (ch. 31–34): そらのおとしもの (8). March 26, 2010 ISBN 978-4-04-715399-8 (in Japanese).
9. Vol. 9 (ch. 35–38): そらのおとしもの (9). September 9, 2010 ISBN 978-4-04-900800-5 (in Japanese).
10. Vol. 10 (ch. 39–42): そらのおとしもの (10). October 26, 2010 ISBN 978-4-04-715545-9 (in Japanese).
11. Vol. 11 (ch. 43–46): そらのおとしもの (11). January 26, 2011 ISBN 978-4-04-715603-6 (in Japanese).
12. Vol. 12 (ch. 47–50): そらのおとしもの (12). June 4, 2011 ISBN 978-4-04-715711-8 (in Japanese).
13. Vol. 13 (ch. 51–54): そらのおとしもの (13). November 26, 2011 ISBN 978-4-04-120008-7 (in Japanese).
14. Vol. 14 (ch. 55–57): そらのおとしもの (14). March 26, 2012 ISBN 978-4-04-120163-3 (in Japanese).
15. Vol. 15 (ch. 58–61): そらのおとしもの (15). July 26, 2012 ISBN 978-4-04-120322-4 (in Japanese).
16. Vol. 16 (ch. 62–65): そらのおとしもの (16). October 26, 2012 ISBN 978-4-04-120442-9 (in Japanese).
17. Vol. 17 (ch. 66–69): そらのおとしもの (17). April 26, 2013 ISBN 978-4-04-120666-9 (in Japanese).
18. Vol. 18 (ch. 70–73): そらのおとしもの (18). October 26, 2013 ISBN 978-4-04-120821-2 (in Japanese).
