= Heaven's Lost Property the Movie: The Angeloid of Clockwork =

- Japanese theatrical release poster featuring, from left to right, Astraea, Ikaros, and Nymph with Hiyori Kazane in the background

Japanese name
- Kanji: 劇場版 そらのおとしもの 時計じかけの哀女神(エンジェロイド)
Transcriptions
- Revised Hepburn: Gekijōban Sora no Otoshimono: Tokei-jikake no Enjeroido
- Directed by: Hisashi Saitō (chief); Tetsuya Yanagisawa
- Screenplay by: Yūko Kakihara
- Based on: Heaven's Lost Property by Suu Minazuki
- Produced by: Jun Fukuda; Seiichi Hachiya; Seiichi Kawashima; Yoshikazu Kumagai
- Edited by: Takashi Sakurai
- Music by: Motoyoshi Iwasaki
- Production company: AIC A.S.T.A
- Distributed by: Kadokawa Pictures
- Release date: June 25, 2011
- Running time: 97 minutes
- Country: Japan
- Language: Japanese
- Box office: $270,495

Heaven's Lost Property the Movie: The Angeloid of Clockwork (劇場版 そらのおとしもの 時計じかけの哀女神(エンジェロイド), Gekijōban Sora no Otoshimono: Tokei-jikake no Enjeroido) is a 2011 Japanese anime fantasy film based on the manga and anime series Heaven's Lost Property by Suu Minazuki. It was released on June 25, 2011, in Japan under the directorship of Hisashi Saitō. The film covers events involving Hiyori Kazane. The DVD version was released on February 24, 2012, in Japan. Funimation licensed the film and released it on February 26, 2013.

== Plot ==
The film opens with Tomoki and the rest of the New World Discovery Club in the middle of another unusual, if not typical, situation. A giant chicken, about whom Tomoki apparently forgot, wreaks havoc on Sorami City, so Tomoki, via one of Ikaros' cards, has Sohara grown to giant size to fight the chicken, which she defeats, but then promptly steps on Tomoki for staring up her skirt. The film then switches to Daedalus who explains more about the Angeloids and their history, and then to a scene where an Angel is asleep in a pod. On Earth, Hiyori Kazane, a resident of Sorami City and the film's main heroine, introduces herself and explains how she met and fell in love with Tomoki, while also narrating about how she took part in several events from the two previous anime seasons, all the while observing Tomoki and his friends, and even becoming acquainted with most of them.

After the recap, Hiyori decides she wants to be closer to Tomoki, so she asks to join the New World Discovery club, though Sugata is against it, as he remembers seeing an Angel resembling Hiyori in Synapse (the same one from earlier in the movie) and is not yet sure what their reality is. He relents however, when Mikako mentions the club's budget will increase with the new addition, which also means Tomoki must now fully participate in the club. Not happy with this, Tomoki decides to make Hiyori quit by subjecting her to various perverted, fake initiation tests, which Hiyori embarrassingly completes. Despite this, Hiyori's feelings for Tomoki remain unchanged and she is welcomed into the club and participates in many activities with them, with even Tomoki accepting her presence and spending much time with her. This makes Sohara, Nymph, and Astraea believe they are dating, but wonder why, so Mikako suggests that Tomoki is blackmailing Hiyori. When the three girls confront Tomoki on this, Hiyori, who overheard everything, clears the misunderstanding and also confesses to Tomoki. Tomoki is left unsure of what to do, while Nymph and Ikaros understand that a relationship between Tomoki and Hiyori is impossible. In Synapse, Sugata asks Daedalus about the relationship between Hiyori and the Angel that resembles her. When she does not answer, Sugata mentions that when he first met Tomoki, he briefly forgot that they had met and asks if that is related to Synapse, to which Daedalus confirms. Sugata decides to further investigate, while on Earth Tomoki goes to meet with Hiyori to give her a reply. On the way, Hiyori is run over by a truck and dies, causing her body to disappear and her existence to be erased from the memories of everyone not related to the Synapse. Realizing what is happening, Sugata desperately runs to where the Angels in pods are, but when he makes it he does not recognize the Hiyori in the pod. The Master of the Synapse appears and taunts Sugata with his forgotten memories and mentions that Hiyori is awakening. Tomoki, unaware of Hiyori's fate, waits for her but when Nymph and Ikaros arrive, the former lies to him and tells him Hiyori will meet him tomorrow. To make up for her lying, Nymph spends the night with Tomoki and asks for the imprinting, but Tomoki explains that he wants her and the other Angeloids to be free. Nymph says she wants to be imprinted because she is in love with Tomoki, but before she can convey her feelings Tomoki experiences severe headaches from the memory wipe, so Nymph holds him, knowing that by tomorrow Tomoki will have forgotten Hiyori.

The next morning, Tomoki still clearly remembers Hiyori, while everyone else has forgotten her. Distraught, Tomoki runs over town searching for her, while in Synapse Hiyori is grief-stricken that her time on Earth has ended, so the Master of the Synapse offers her one more chance to see Tomoki. Tomoki confronts Ikaros and Nymph on what is happening, but Nymph explains they cannot tell him anything for fear of Tomoki learning that Hiyori is not the only part of his reality that isn't real. Tomoki collapses from the severe headache pain, so the two Angeloids including Astraea look after him. Nymph picks up something on her radar, so the three go to investigate, and find Hiyori. The reunion is cut short when, she is transformed into an Angeloid and is ordered by the Master of the Synapse to kill the three. Hiyori uses her ability of time manipulation to attack both Sorami City and the Angeloids, and easily overpowers the three. Nymph determines the only way to stop Hiyori is to kill her, though Ikaros objects, but Nymph reluctantly prepares to do so, until she is stopped by Tomoki, who swears to save Hiyori. The Master of the Synapse orders Hiyori to kill Tomoki, but Sugata arrives to help, while the three Angeloids stall Hiyori. They manage to destroy the structure that binds her, but it does not free her. Nymph also realizes that the dimensional mechanism system that produces Hiyori's time altering powers has reached the breaking point causing a process that will result in the area around Hiyori, Sorami City, to be blown away. Unable to stop the process, Ikaros traps Hiyori within her Aegis to contain the blast, but also traps herself in since she does not want Hiyori to be alone in her final moments. Tomoki however glides to them and is let into the Aegis, where he is able to bring Hiyori back to her senses. Hiyori begs for them to get away as it won't be long before she self-destructs, so she uses her hacking abilities to dispel the Aegis, and kisses Tomoki before leaving. She thanks him and remembers how they first met as children, and that it was because of him that she came to love Sorami City. She notes that while her time on Earth was short, she enjoyed her time with everyone and thanks her friends and Tomoki, and reaffirms her love for him before being destroyed. Tomoki breaks down in tears, and the film ends with him swearing that he will never forget Hiyori.

Near the end of the credits, Sohara is seen viewing the scrapbook, filled with pictures of the group having fun. As Sohara leaves, a picture where Hiyori had faded away due to the Synapse's deletion, is seen where Hiyori slowly fades back in, revealing that she has somehow been revived.

In a post-credits scene, Tomoki stands at the spot overlooking the city where he and Hiyori first met and behind him a ray of light shines down with feathers falling from the sky. When he looks up, he smiles happily, and as the screen fades out, the sound of Hiyori's bell ornaments are heard, once again, implying that she has somehow been revived.

== Voice cast ==
Character	Japanese	English
Tomoki Sakurai	Soichiro Hoshi	Greg Ayres
Ikaros	Saori Hayami	Brittney Karbowski
Sohara Mitsuki	Mina	Trina Nishimura
Eishiro Sugata	Tatsuhisa Suzuki	Eric Vale
Mikako Satsukitane	Ayahi Takagaki	Jamie Marchi
Nymph	Iori Nomizu	Kara Edwards
Astraea	Kaori Fukuhara	Carli Mosier
Hiyori Kazane/Zeta	Yōko Hikasa	Colleen Clinkenbeard
Daedalus	Asuka Ōgame	Monica Rial
Sky Master	Shinichiro Miki	Mike McFarland

== Songs ==
Opening theme

- "Second"
  - Lyrics: Seiji Miura
  - Composition: Asu (of The New Classics)
  - Arrangement: Atsushi Umebari
  - Artist: Blue Drops (Hitomi Yoshida and Ikaros (Saori Hayami))

Ending theme

- "Sora to Maboroshi" (そらとまぼろし, Skies and Illusions)
  - Lyrics: Natsumi Tadano
  - Composition: Katomi Yazu
  - Arrangement: Kenta Miyahara
  - Artist: Blue Drops

Insert songs

- "Super☆Love Fusion!! Angel-Robo!!" (超☆愛合体!!エンジェロボ!!, Chō☆Ai Gattai!! Enjerobo!!)
  - Lyrics: Suu Minazuki
  - Composition: Seiji Miura
  - Arrangement: Seiji Miura
  - Artist: Takayuki Miyauchi, Tomoki Sakurai (Soichiro Hoshi) and Sohara Mitsuki (Mina)
- "Crayon" (クレヨン, Kureyon)
  - Lyrics: Seiji Miura
  - Composition: Motoyoshi Iwasaki
  - Arrangement: Motoyoshi Iwasaki
  - Artist: Hiyori Kazane (Yōko Hikasa)
