= Kaori Fukuhara =

Japanese voice actress and singer

- 福原 香織
- Born: August 11, 1986 (age 40); Chiba Prefecture, Japan
- Occupation: Voice actress
- Years active: 2005–present
- Musical career
- Genres: Anison
- Instrument: Vocals
- Labels: Pony Canyon; Lantis

Kaori Fukuhara (福原 香織, Fukuhara Kaori; born August 11, 1986) is a Japanese voice actress.

She worked on the music group Bohemian Quarter's album "Blister Pack Voices". She and Emiri Kato were in a duo music group called Kato*Fuku, which sang theme songs for When Supernatural Battles Became Commonplace. Kato*Fuku released three albums from 2012 to 2015, and disbanded in 2016.

== Filmography ==
=== Anime ===
- Animal Yokochō (Kumiko "Kuu-chan" Takeda; Mr. Nonko-chan) (2005)
- The Law of Ueki (Pudding) (2005)
- Bakegyamon (Kimidori) (2006)
- Gargoyle of Yoshinaga House (Rin) (2006)
- Lucky Star (Tsukasa Hiiragi) (2007)
- Hayate the Combat Butler (Suzuki Shinkō) (2008)
- Macross F (Ram Hoa, dancer) (2008)
- Akaneiro ni Somaru Saka (Aya Nijo) (2008)
- Zettai Karen Children (Hanai Chisato) (2008)
- Fight Ippatsu! Jūden-chan!! (Plug Cryostat) (2009)
- NEEDLESS (Seto) (2009)
- Pandora Hearts (Ada Vessalius) (2009)
- Saki (Koromo Amae) (2009)
- The Sacred Blacksmith (Charlotte E. Firobisher) (2009)
- Sora no Otoshimono: Forte (Astraea) (2010)
- Sora no Otoshimono the Movie: The Angeloid of Clockwork (Astraea) (2011)
- A Channel (Run) (2011)
- Beelzebub (Lamia) (2011)
- Place to Place (Hime Haruno) (2012)
- Chūnibyō Demo Koi ga Shitai! (Kuzuha Togashi) (2012)
- Saki Achiga-hen episode of Side-A (Koromo Amae) (2012)
- Dansai Bunri no Crime Edge (Yamane Byōinzaka) (2013)
- Chūnibyō demo Koi ga Shitai! Ren (Kuzuha Togashi) (2014)
- Wake Up, Girls! (Nanoka Aizawa) (2014)
- When Supernatural Battles Became Commonplace (Mirei Kudō) (2014)
- The Testament of Sister New Devil (Maria Naruse) (2015)
- The Testament of Sister New Devil Burst (Maria Naruse) (2015)
- Tsukiuta. The Animation (Akane Asagiri) (2016)

=== ONA / OVA ===
- Lucky Star: Original na Visual to Animation (Tsukasa Hiiragi) (2008)
- Yotsunoha (Nanami Minami) (2008)
- Ashiaraiyashiki no Jūnin-tachi (Koma Ryusoji) (2010)
- Heaven's Lost Property (Astrea) (2010)
- A Channel + smile (Run Momoki) (2012)
- Chūnibyō demo Koi ga Shitai! Lite (Kuzuha Togashi) (2012)
- Lucky Star: Miyakawa-ke no Kūfuku (Tsukasa Hiiragi) (2012)

=== Anime Films ===
- Heaven's Lost Property the Movie: The Angeloid of Clockwork (Astrea) (2011)
- Wake Up, Girls! Shichi-nin no Idol (Nanoka Aizawa) (2014)
- Sora no Otoshimono Final: Eternal My Master (Astrea) (2014)
- Love, Chunibyo & Other Delusions! Take on Me (Kuzuha Togashi) (2018)

=== Drama CDs ===
- KonoSuba (Aqua) (2015)

=== Video games ===
- Gyakuten Saiban 2 (Pearl Fey/Harumi Ayasato) (2002)
- Sora no Otoshimono Forte: Dreamy Season (Nintendo DS) (Astraea) (2011)
- Granblue Fantasy (Sophia) (2014)
- Bullet Girls (2014)
- Tokyo Mirage Sessions ♯FE (Mamori Minamoto) (2015)

=== Dubbing ===
Original year	Dub year	Title	Role	Original actor	Notes
2012		Exchange Student Zero	Lucinda	Natalie Bond, Keegan Connor Tracy	
