= Gou-dere Sora Nagihara =

Japanese manga series

- First volume cover

豪デレ美少女 凪原そら (Gō Dere Bishōjo Nagihara Sora)
- Genre: Erotic comedy; Romantic comedy
- Manga
- Written by: Suu Minazuki
- Published by: Hakusensha
- English publisher: NA: Yen Press
- Magazine: Young Animal Island; Young Animal Arashi
- Original run: August 29, 2008 – June 27, 2014
- Volumes: 4

Gou-dere Sora Nagihara (豪デレ美少女 凪原そら, Gō Dere Bishōjo Nagihara Sora; lit. "Strongly Lovestruck Beauty – Sora Nagihara") is a Japanese erotic comedy romance manga series written and illustrated by Suu Minazuki. It was published by Hakusensha, first, since 2008, in the seinen manga magazine Young Animal Island, and later, since 2013, in Young Animal Arashi. A total of four volumes were published. It is published in English by Yen Press.

== Plot ==
Shouta Yamakawa is a first year in high school who loves everything 2D such as manga, but is no good at speaking with women. Shouta has fallen in love with Sora Nagihara a character from a recent manga series he has been reading. One day, Sora comes to life literally into the real world. At first Shouta thinks that just like in the manga series Sora would mimic her gentle personality but he is quickly disappointed to find out otherwise. When Shouta mentions his problem with girls to Sora, she says to him that he looks like someone who will one day rule the world. Sora wastes little time bringing Shouta other high school girls in his dorm, sexually harassing them in the process. Shouta who wants none of this is arrested more than once in the aftermath of her antics. One of the girls who gets affected by Sora is Ryouko Kaburagi, a childhood friend of Shouta's as well as the dorm's leader. Ryouko who has had enough asks her friend, and boxing president Tenka Moro'oka for help. Tenka though is no match for Sora who uses a "secret 2-D art of death" technique on her which enlarges her breasts making it harder for her to fight. Due to her inability to fight at her best Tenka is expelled from the boxing club, but Shouta comes to her aid in the end. Ryouko eventually snaps from Sora's behavior and orders her out, rather than stay Shouta goes with her to Ryouko's surprise. Having nowhere to stay Tenka shyly asks Shouta if he would like to come home with her to which he accepts.

Later on things become intense when another Sora appears out of Shouta's book claiming to be the real Sora Nagihara. This Sora ends up being crueler than the first and is defeated when Shouta chooses the one he met first over her. In the third book, another character named Teruno Sakura-zaka comes out of a book owned by Ryouko and offers to help her out with her childhood crush. Teruno tricks Ryouko however, and does 2-D fighting art techniques of her own. Unable to beat her in combat, Sora is left to watch in anger until Teruno's cockiness lands her in trouble. Shouta though again goes out of his way to help another female resulting in Teruno blushing by his kindness. After the battle Shouta is introduced to Oshino Wakatsuki via her yelling to keep it down while she studies. The last volume of Gou-dere focuses on how Oshino is under tremendous pressure to study. Shouta reaches out to her to Oshino's initial resistance until she comes to realize to have fun in life as well. In the end, Shouta is stuck on the head by Ryouko who is disgusted at mistakenly finding him doing something perverted. The result of the head trauma causes a side effect from all the 2-D art techniques which results in Shouta's personality being altered and his libido increased. Sora chases after him when he goes to look for more women, and when she catches up to him Shouta confesses his love to her. Oshino comes along soon after and bashes his head again returning him to normal leaving Sora to wonder which side made the confession.

== Characters ==
Shōta Yamakawa (やまかわ しょうた, Yamakawa Shōta)
Shōta Yamakawa is the protagonist of the story.
Sora Nagihara (なぎはら そら, Nagihara Sora)
Sora Nagihara
Tenka Moro'oka (もろおか てんか, Moro'oka Tenka)
Ryouko Kaburagi (かぶらぎ りょうこ, Kaburagi Ryouko)
Oshino Wakatsuki (わかつき おしの, Wakatsuki Oshino)
Takahiro Moro'oka
Takashiro is the author of the manga Sora is from Tama X Kiss, he uses the pen name Segu=T.
Segu Nanadoh
Segu is Tenka's teacher
Teruno Sakura-zaka
Teruno is a character from a manga series about childhood friends that Ryouko reads. When she comes out of the book, she appears tall and busty but Ryouko finds out that is a disguise. Teruno's true self is a young elementary school aged girl who is tired of staying the same age as the series she is in is now over a decade old. Teruno offers to help Ryouko with her childhood friend that lead to a happy ending, thinking about how much she loves Shota she accepts. Teruno ends up tricking Ryouko by having Shōta fall for his neighbor instead via a 2-D art of death technique. In the process it is also revealed by Sora that she is a member of the "2-D enforcement unit" which is set on invading the real 3-D world. Teruno is eventually defeated through her own cockiness while claiming victory when she falls out of her adult disguise. After her true self is revealed she is no match for Segu, and Takahiro who decide to perv on her. Shōta rescues her in the end by calling the police that drives the two away, but in the process Shota is taken away by the police instead. Teruno is left blushing by his kind-ness remarking on how cool he is.

== Publication ==
Gou-dere Sora Nagihara spanned four manga volumes. These were originally released in Japan between January 28, 2011, and June 27, 2014. An English adaptation was released by Yen Press on November 18, 2014. All four volumes were released in North America by August 18, 2015.

== Reception ==
Anime News Network's Rebecca Silverman gave volume 1 an overall grade of B.
