= Dokunie Cooking =

Japanese manga series

- First volume cover

毒贄クッキング (Dokunie Kukkingu)
- Genre: Fantasy comedy; Gourmet
- Manga
- Written by: Suu Minazuki
- Published by: Hakusensha
- Imprint: Young Animal Comics
- Magazine: Young Animal
- Original run: October 13, 2017 – March 8, 2019
- Volumes: 4

Dokunie Cooking (Japanese: 毒贄クッキング, Hepburn: Dokunie Kukkingu) is a Japanese manga series written and illustrated by Suu Minazuki. It was serialized in Hakusensha's seinen manga magazine Young Animal from October 2017 to March 2019, with its chapters collected in four tankōbon volumes.

== Publication ==
Written and illustrated by Suu Minazuki, Dokunie Cooking was serialized in Hakusensha's seinen manga magazine Young Animal from October 13, 2017, to March 8, 2019. Hakusensha collected its chapters in four tankōbon volumes, released from May 29, 2018, to May 29, 2019.

=== Volumes ===
No.	Release date	ISBN
1	May 29, 2018	978-4-592-16171-4
2	September 28, 2018	978-4-592-16172-1
3	February 28, 2019	978-4-592-16173-8
4	May 29, 2019	978-4-592-16174-5
