= Judas (manga) =

Japanese manga series

- The cover of the first volume of Judas
- Manga
- Written by: Suu Minazuki
- Published by: Kadokawa Shoten
- English publisher: NA: Viz Media
- Magazine: Monthly Shōnen Ace
- Original run: 2004 – 2006
- Volumes: 5

Judas (stylized in all caps) is a Japanese manga series written and illustrated by Suu Minazuki. It was serialized in Kadokawa Shoten's Monthly Shōnen Ace magazine from 2004 to 2006, with its individual chapters collected into five volumes.

== Plot ==
Judas is cursed for his sins to kill 666 people to regain his humanity. However, he is forbidden human contact and has no corporeal body. In order to kill, he uses his slave, Eve, to kill for him. Every time Eve's blood is spilled, Judas comes out and forces Eve to "say his prayers", and kill. However, despite being forced to commit heinous acts, Eve is forced to dress like a girl. Judas had mistaken him for a girl when they had first met, and so he forced Eve to dress like a girl. Sometime along the course of their relationship, they meet a professor, who joins them.

== Publication ==
Written and illustrated by Suu Minazuki, the series was serialized in Kadokawa Shoten's Monthly Shōnen Ace magazine from 2004 to 2006. Its individual chapters were collected into five tankōbon volumes.

Tokyopop published the series in English from 2006 to 2008. It was also available on the JManga website. In February 2016, Viz Media began re-releasing the series in English digitally.

== Reception ==
Leroy Douresseaux of Comic Book Bin felt the story got better as it progressed, though he felt the comedy was out of place. Douresseaux had mixed feelings on the artwork, though he felt it got better as the series progressed. Sheena McNeil of Sequential Tart was critical of the art style, though McNeil praised the conclusion to the first volume. Jarred Pine of Mania criticized the story's pacing and transitions, ultimately describing it as "a bit of a mess". In Manga: The Complete Guide, Jason Thompson described the plot as "not amusing to read" and the artwork as "confusing and ugly".
