= Mina (voice actress) =

Japanese voice actress

- 美名
- Born: Mina Kasai; February 13, 1984 (age 42); Gifu, Gifu Prefecture, Japan
- Occupation: Voice actress
- Years active: 2006–present
- Employer: Production Ace

Mina Kasai (葛西 美名, Kasai Mina; born February 13, 1984), known professionally as Mina (美名, Mina), is a Japanese voice actress from Gifu, Gifu Prefecture, Japan. She is affiliated with Production Ace.

== Career ==
In 2006, she won the Animax public audition and made her debut as voice actress. She has a wide vocal range that plays from young girls and girls to adult women and even boys. Unlike the voice of Sohara Mitsuki in the anime series Heaven's Lost Property that was played for the first time, the local voice is relatively husky and mature.

Her special skill is sword fighting. In addition, she has obtained a senior dressing instructor and a cook license. The Heaven's Lost Property's web radio "Soraoto-Fu-Rin ☆ Love-" started appearing every time from the middle of the program, but was treated as "Guest appearing every time".

== Filmography ==
Bold denotes leading roles.

=== Anime ===
2009

- Fight Ippatsu! Jūden-chan!! as Technological development staff A
- Heaven's Lost Property as **Sohara Mitsuki**
- The Melancholy of Haruhi Suzumiya as Female elementary student (ep 13)

2010

- Omamori Himari as young Yūto Amakawa, female student, newscaster
- Heaven's Lost Property: Forte as **Sohara Mitsuki**

2011

- A Dark Rabbit Has Seven Lives as **Haruka Shigure**
- Gosick as Lee (eps 2–3), Maid (ep 21), Mother (ep 23), Nun (eps 16–17), Nurse (ep 19), Student B (eps 1, 4), Villager C (ep 7)
- Kore wa Zombie Desu ka? as Kanami Mihara, Nurse (ep 5)
- Inazuma Eleven GO as **Midori Seto**, Reiichi Miyabino
- Maken-ki! as Minori Rokujou

2012

- Kore wa Zombie Desu ka? of the Dead as Kanami Mihara
- Seitokai no Ichizon Lv.2 as Chizuru Akaba

2014

- Dai-Shogun – Great Revolution as Kondo Isami
- Maken-ki! Two as Minori Rokujo

2015

- The Testament of Sister New Devil Burst as Noel

2016

- Bungo Stray Dogs as Kirako Haruno

=== OVA ===
2010

- Heaven's Lost Property as **Sohara Mitsuki**

=== Films ===
- Heaven's Lost Property the Movie: The Angeloid of Clockwork

=== Dubbing ===
- The Birth of a Nation as Nancy Turner (Aunjanue Ellis)
- Taken as Amanda (Katie Cassidy)
