= Watashi no Messiah-sama =

Japanese manga series

私の救世主さま (Watashi no Kyūseishu-sama)
- Manga
- Written by: Suu Minazuki
- Published by: Square Enix
- English publisher: JManga
- Magazine: Monthly Shōnen Gangan
- Original run: 2002 – 2007
- Volumes: 6
- Manga

Watashi no Kyūseishu-sama ~lacrima~
- Written by: Suu Minazuki
- Published by: Square Enix
- Magazine: Monthly GFantasy
- Original run: 2007 – 2008
- Volumes: 7

Watashi no Kyūseishu-sama (私の救世主さま; "My Messiah") is a Japanese manga series by Suu Minazuki, serialized in Monthly Shōnen Gangan. It ran from 2002 to 2007, with 26 chapters. The sequel, Watashi no Kyūseishu-sama ~lacrima~, was serialized in Monthly GFantasy, with 35 chapters. The whole series has 13 volumes.

== Manga ==
The series ran from 2002 to 2007, with 26 chapters. The sequel, Watashi no Kyūseishu-sama ~lacrima~, was serialized in Monthly GFantasy, with 35 chapters. The whole series has 13 volumes.

The series has been published in English by JManga.
