= Monthly Shōnen Ace =

Japanese manga magazine

- Categories: Shōnen manga
- Frequency: Monthly
- Circulation: 100,000 (2017)
- Founded: 1994
- Company: Kadokawa Shoten
- Country: Japan
- Based in: Tokyo
- Language: Japanese
- Website: web-ace.jp/shonenace (in Japanese)

Monthly Shōnen Ace (Japanese: 月刊少年エース, Hepburn: Gekkan Shōnen Ēsu) is a monthly shōnen manga magazine in Japan published by Kadokawa Shoten, started in 1994. Unlike the big shōnen weeklies with circulation figures in the millions, Ace is aimed at a less mainstream audience, and has a particular emphasis on anime tie-ins.

An online version of the magazine, titled Shōnen Ace Plus, was launched in June 2019.

== Manga artists and series featured in Shōnen Ace ==
- Imaru Adachi
  - Higehiro: After Being Rejected, I Shaved and Took In a High School Runaway (ongoing)
- Natsume Akatsuki
  - Kemono Michi
- Katsu Aki
  - The Vision of Escaflowne (shōnen version; shōjo version was serialized in Asuka Fantasy DX)
- Sae Amatsu
  - Guardian Hearts
- Keiichi Arawi
  - Nichijou (ongoing)
- Clamp
  - Angelic Layer
- Nishiwaki Datto
  - Fate/stay night
- Sakae Esuno
  - Hanako and the Terror of Allegory
  - Future Diary
  - Big Order
  - Reign of the Seven Spellblades manga adaptation
- Kamui Fujiwara
  - Kerberos Panzer Cop (story by Mamoru Oshii, previously ran in Combat Comic and Amazing Comics)
- Masaru Gotsubo
  - Samurai Champloo
- Ryūsuke Hamamoto
  - Petit Eva (original work by Gainax & khara inc.)
- Yuichi Hasegawa
  - Mobile Suit Crossbone Gundam (story by Yoshiyuki Tomino)
- Ikumi Hino
  - Mother of the Goddess' Dormitory
- Masahiro Ikeno
  - Banished from the Heroes' Party (ongoing)
  - Mobile Suit Victory Gundam Outside Story
- Sekihiko Inui
  - Ratman
- Yūji Iwahara
  - Chikyu Misaki
  - Koudelka
- Sōsuke Kaise
  - Grenadier
- Kaishaku
  - Kannazuki no Miko
  - Steel Angel Kurumi (originally featured in Monthly Shonen Ace Dash/A' DASH, later moved to Monthly Ace Next; now discontinued)
- Mario Kaneda
  - Girls Bravo
  - Saving Life
- Masato Kanetsuki
  - Sword Art Online: Unital Ring (created by Reki Kawahara) (ongoing)
- Karuna Kanzaki
  - Armed Girl's Machiavellism (written by Yūya Kurokami)
- Jinsei Kataoka and Kazuma Kondou
  - Eureka Seven
  - Deadman Wonderland
  - Smokin' Parade
- Ranmaru Kotone
  - The Girl Who Leapt Through Time
- Masami Kurumada
  - B't X
- Tomohiro Marukawa
  - The World of Narue
- Sankichi Meguro
  - Ghost Talker's Daydream (written by Saki Okuse)
- Haruhiko Mikimoto
  - Macross 7: Trash
  - Macross The First
- Suu Minazuki
  - Judas
  - Heaven's Lost Property
  - Plunderer
- Seijuro Miz
  - Mushi-Uta
- Masato Natsumoto
  - Record of Lodoss War: Chronicles of the Heroic Knight (story by Ryo Mizuno)
- Kenji Oiwa
  - Welcome to the N.H.K. (created by Tatsuhiko Takimoto)
- Yoshiyuki Sadamoto
  - Neon Genesis Evangelion (moved to Young Ace in 2009)
- Kei Sanbe
  - Kamiyadori
- Hajime Segawa
  - Ga-Rei
  - Tokyo ESP
- Monako Serasai
  - Kaitō Tenshi Twin Angel
- Yū Shimizu
  - The Demon Sword Master of Excalibur Academy (ongoing)
- Tatsuya Shingyoji
  - The King of Fighters '94
- Kumiko Suekane
  - Blood+
- Yukiru Sugisaki
  - Brain Powerd (story by Yoshiyuki Tomino)
- Shou Tajima
  - Multiple Personality Detective Psycho (story by Eiji Otsuka; moved to Young Ace in 2009)
- Yoshiki Takaya
  - Bio Booster Armor Guyver (moved to Young Ace in 2009, continued here after Monthly Shōnen Captain's cancelation)
- Kitsune Tennouji
  - Eden's Bowy (pulled from Comptiq in 1994)
- Yasunari Toda
  - Mobile Suit Gundam Seed Astray R (story by Tomohiro Chiba, created by Yoshiyuki Tomino and Hajime Yatate)
- Meguru Ueno
  - My First Girlfriend Is a Gal (ongoing)
- Tetsuto Uesu
  - Shinmai Maō no Testament
- Housui Yamazaki
  - Mail
- Kagami Yoshimizu
  - Lucky Star (cameo strips only)
- Mine Yoshizaki
  - Sgt. Frog (ongoing)
- Kumichi Yoshizuki
  - Someday's Dreamers: Summer Skies (written by Norie Yamada)

== Circulation ==
Year / Period	Monthly circulation	Magazine sales	Sales revenue (est.)	Issue price
September 2003 to August 2004	59,167	710,004	¥394,762,224	¥556
September 2004 to August 2005	68,917	827,004	¥459,814,224	¥556
September 2005 to August 2006	80,833	969,996	¥539,317,776	¥556
September 2006 to December 2007	91,666	1,466,656	¥815,460,736	¥556
January 2008 to September 2008	80,834	727,506	¥404,493,336	¥556
October 2008 to September 2009	83,334	1,000,008	¥556,004,448	¥556
October 2009 to September 2010	75,084	901,008	¥514,475,568	¥571
October 2010 to September 2011	66,500	798,000	¥472,416,000	¥592
October 2011 to September 2012	60,417	725,004	¥432,827,388	¥597
October 2012 to September 2013	75,000	900,000	¥537,300,000	¥597
October 2013 to September 2014	75,000	900,000	¥537,300,000	¥597
October 2014 to September 2015	100,000	1,200,000	¥715,200,000	¥597
October 2015 to September 2016	100,000	1,200,000	¥716,400,000	¥597
October 2016 to September 2017	100,000	1,200,000	¥716,400,000	¥597
2004 to September 2017	80,031	13,525,186	¥7,812,171,700 ($73,385,513)	¥578
