= Japanese destroyer Minazuki =

Two destroyers of the Imperial Japanese Navy were named Minazuki or Minatsuki 水無月 ("June") :

- Japanese destroyer Minatsuki (1906), a Kamikaze-class destroyer launched in 1906, converted to a minesweeper in 1924 and renamed W-10 in 1928 before being stricken in 1930
- Japanese destroyer Minazuki (1926), a Mutsuki-class destroyer launched in 1926 and sunk in 1944
