= Plunderer (manga) =

Japanese manga series and its adaptation

- Cover of the first manga volume

プランダラ (Purandara)
- Genre: Action, fantasy
- Manga
- Written by: Suu Minazuki
- Published by: Kadokawa Shoten
- English publisher: NA: Yen Press
- Magazine: Monthly Shōnen Ace
- Original run: December 26, 2014 – April 26, 2022
- Volumes: 21
- Anime television series
- Directed by: Hiroyuki Kanbe
- Produced by: Hideo Momota; Hiroyasu Taniguchi; Rie Ogura; Soujirou Arimizu; Adam Zehner; Hideaki Matsumoto; Kousei Kawamoto
- Written by: Masashi Suzuki
- Music by: Junichi Matsumoto
- Studio: Geek Toys
- Licensed by: Crunchyroll
- Original network: Tokyo MX, KBS, TVA, SUN BS11, AT-X
- English network: US: Crunchyroll Channel
- Original run: January 8, 2020 – June 24, 2020
- Episodes: 24
- icon

Plunderer (Japanese: プランダラ, Hepburn: Purandara) is a Japanese manga series written and illustrated by Suu Minazuki. It began serialization in Kadokawa Shoten's Monthly Shōnen Ace magazine in December 2014. The series is licensed by Yen Press. An anime television series adaptation by Geek Toys aired from January to June 2020.

== Plot ==
In a post-apocalyptic world called Alcia, every human being had their worth measured by a special "Count" printed on their bodies, which records an important aspect of their life. This Count dictates their social standings in relation to others, with people bearing a lower Count being unable to refuse orders from someone with a higher Count. If the Count decreases down to 0, the person will forever be dragged down into the "Abyss". The system governing these aspects were called the "Althing".

For young Hina Farrow, her Count (initially shown to be 441) corresponds to how many hundreds of kilometers she has walked. Ever since her mother was dragged into the Abyss and leaving her with a last wish, she has been traveling alone and searching for someone called the Legendary Ace for the last five years, all the while carrying an enigmatic sphere with a 10,000 Count on it, later revealed to be one of the seven original Ballots. Hina's journey took a sudden turn when she met a strange masked pervert, Licht Bach, with a negative -999 Count. Revealed to be a true Legendary Ace himself, Licht rescued Hina from an Ace impostor from the Alcian Royal Army, but claimed that he was not the Ace she was looking for.

Their journey led them to meeting with members from influential factions within Alcia. They also came into contact with a 300-years old long history and conspiracy linked to the Althing, the mystery surrounding the Legendary Aces, and the fate of the world itself.

== Characters ==
Licht Bach (リヒトー=バッハ, Rihitō Bahha) / Rihito Sakai (坂井離人, Sakai Rihitō)
Voiced by: Yoshiki Nakajima (Japanese); Eric Vale (English)
Licht is a tall young-looking man with long white hair. First appearing as a pervert wearing a mask groping Hina, Licht is a Legendary Ace, powerful heroes that lived over 300 years ago, when they put an end to the Waste War, while carrying two different Counts. He is called the "Ace of Flashing Strikes", and was also the first to receive the Ace surgery. His designation was of a Colonel. Throughout the story, he fell in love with Hina. He is shown to be a very pervy man, but is in truth a deeply kind person who hesitates to kill and prefers to subdue his enemies non-lethally.
His initial Count was −999, shown on the back of his left hand, which was the number of times he was rejected by girls. His Ace ballot Count is 5,700 printed on his long Odachi-like sword, which is based on the number of enemies he kills. His Ace ability is light-speed movement, which he often uses to defeat his opponents by simply moving near them.
Hina Farrow (陽菜=ファロウ, Hina Farou)
Voiced by: Rina Honnizumi (Japanese); Sarah Wiedenheft (English)
Hina is an innocent traveling girl with long light-blue hair and a very slim lithe figure. She possesses one of the original Ballots which had been entrusted to her by her mother, Tsukina Farrow. She's a very capable and independent girl, shown to be proficient with killing wild animals and treating wounds, which is the result of the years traveling by herself. She quickly develops a feeling with Licht, which was strengthened during her journey back in time to meet him 300 years ago, promising to never let him live alone again. She was the daughter of Tokikaze Sakai, Licht's adoptive sibling and another Legendary Ace. Her relationship with both Licht and her father proved to be vital to the story later on.
Her initial Count was 441, based on how many hundreds of kilometres she has walked.
Jail Murdoch (ジェイル=マードック, Jeiru Mādokku)
Voiced by: Yūichirō Umehara (Japanese); David Matranga (English)
Jail is a strong-willed tall man with long hair and glasses, and a First Lieutenant of the Alcian Royal Army. He is a very strict and serious person and often treats his subordinates harshly, but was shown to have a softer and kinder side to him. He is a very confident and caring man, often opting to face the enemies by himself in order to protect those he loved, and refusing to shy from a conflict with a clearly stronger opponent. Despite seemingly being uninterested in the opposite sex, Jail had been shown to bleed profusely from the nose when looking at naked girls (much like Licht does). He later develops a feeling for Nana Bassler, which he promised to always be together with 300 years ago.
His initial Count was 12,500, which he disguises as 900 to avoid promotion in the Army, which is based on how many convictions he has made. His military Ballot grants him the ability to control metal, which, when paired with his combat skill, makes him a formidable fighter on the battlefield.
Lynn May (リィン=メイ, Ryin Mei)
Voiced by: Ari Ozawa (Japanese); Elizabeth Maxwell (English)
Lynn is a young woman with a neck-long black hair and shapely figure who is a Sergeant Major of the Army serving in the small mountain town of Homhough with Pele, reporting directly to Jail. She is a genuinely kind and spirited person dedicated to her job and always eager to help people in need, although her efforts often fails due to poorly-thought plans and clumsy executions. She dislikes short skirts, and was constantly dismayed at her mandated military outfits. She becomes infatuated with Licht earlier on, whom he called "Mr. Pudding" due to the manner of which they met, but later fell in love with Pele.
Her initial Count was 441, and is based on how many people she helps. In combat, she utilizes her proficiency in martial arts. Her attacking speed was shown to be capable of surpassing some Ace abilities, displayed when she managed to land a hit on Schmerman when the others fail to do so.
Pele Poporo (ペレ=ポポロ, Pere Poporo) / Gespenst Zerlegen (ゲシュペンス=ゼレーゲン, Geshupensu Zerēgen)
Voiced by: Aoi Ichikawa (Japanese); Austin Tindle (English)
Pele is a man of short stature with a blonde hair which is a Sergeant serving under Lynn in Homhough. Originally seeming to be a carefree person who often jokes and insults Lynn despite being her direct subordinate, Pele was later revealed to be a highly intelligent and skilled Special Service Unit operative planted amidst the Royal Army, and is cold and calculating in dire situations. He is the secret seventh Legendary Ace, called "Ace of Piercing Strikes". He often makes fun of Lynn's incompetence and her endowed body (something that the other characters later do as well as a recurring joke). Later on, though, he was revealed to be extremely caring for her well-being.
His initial Count was 120 (but was probably fake), which was based on how many times he had doubted someone. His Ace ability lets him read other people's minds.
Nana Bassler (ナナ=バスーラ, Nana Basūra)
Voiced by: Shizuka Itō (Japanese); Caitlin Glass (English)
Nana is a well-endowed dark-skinned woman which travels with Licht on her mobile bar. She rescued Hina from Licht's groping, and explains the systems surrounding Alcia to her (Hina being largely oblivious to the world due to a lot of her childhood spent with only her mother). In truth, she was the first survivor of the Ace genetic surgery as a child 300 years ago, dubbed "Test Subject no. 7" and later "Ace of Conscious Strikes". With her Ace abilities, she sent Hina, Jail, Lynn, and Pele to the past, revealing the truth of Alcia and Abyss. Initially wanting to be Licht's wife, even escaping the military complex with him and subsequently wandering around Alcia for 300 years while avoiding capture, she later fell in love with Jail, who shown her genuine sympathy for her plights.
Her Count is 77, which is the number of times her food gets complimented. Her Ace Count was shown to be 7 at first, and was later revealed to be a countdown of the number of uses she had left of her Ace ability, which is time travel.
Mizuka Sonohara (園原 水花, Sonohara Mizuka)
Voiced by: Aoi Yūki (Japanese); Alexis Tipton (English)
Mizuka is a slim long-haired girl wearing glasses with a mechanical left arm who was first shown to be a bloodthirsty gun-toting killer rampaging on a town, and highly obsessive with Licht, who recognizes her as one of the Legendary Aces, the "Ace of Pursuit". Later, it was revealed that she was under the effect of a drug which caused Aces to gain power but lose rational thinking. She held a close relationship with Doan, which hid a protective intent for her under a facade of abuse and violence towards her. Introduced as the most cowardly Ace at first, Mizuka gradually gains the courage to fight on and became immune to the effects of the bloodlust-induced drug used by the Special Service Unit to control her. She lost her left arm from a sword slash from an out-of-control Licht 300 years ago.
Her initial Ace Count was 16,000, the basis of which was unknown. In battle, she uses various firearms, ranging from a six-shooter pistol), a submachine gun, to a high-powered scoped rifle. Her Ace ability consists of projectile manipulation, able to make her shots turn and bend towards her targets. She was also the only Legendary Ace capable of flight.
Taketora Doan (道安 武虎, Dōan Taketora)
Voiced by: Satoshi Hino (Japanese); Tyson Rinehart (English)
Doan is a large and imposing man with a rectangular-shaped pupils and an aggressive, bullying personality. He was a Special Service Unit operative and Ace serving under Schmerman, dubbed the "Ace of Heavy Strikes". He was shown to be Licht's partner during the Waste War 300 years ago. Despite displaying a highly violent and rough personality earlier on, he was revealed to deeply care for the well-being of his fellow Aces, especially Mizuka, the only person who didn't seem afraid of him, whom he fell in love with. This attitude was even later extended to the other characters as well.
His initial Ace count was 125,546, and was based on the number of times he made his enemies surrender. His Ace ability grants him control of gravity, able to slow down enemy movements and even crush them.
Tokikaze Sakai (坂井 時風, Sakai Tokikaze)
Voiced by: Kaito Ishikawa (Japanese); Ricco Fajardo (English)
Tokikaze is a tall man with black hair, and highly proficient with swords. He is Licht's adoptive brother, and was later revealed to be Hina's father and a fellow Ace called the "Ace of Sudden Strikes". The only Legendary Ace to oppose the "Alcian Plan", he was believed to be dead when a rampaging Licht slashed him 300 years ago, but reappeared with a hatred towards Alcia and a ploy to defeat the world in a new war. He was torn between saving his closest friend Licht and only family left Hina, but was relieved to see the two together. During his military school days 300 years ago, Tokikaze quickly forms a rivalry with Jail.
His initial Count was shown to be 507,025, and is based on the number of friends he killed. His Ace ability allows him to cut enemies down in an instant.
Alexandrov Grigorovich (アレクサンドロフ=グリゴローヴィッチ, Arekusandorofu Gurigorōvicchi) / Alan (アラン, Aran)
Voiced by: Hiroki Tōchi (Japanese); David Wald (English)
Alan is a tall middle-aged man who was the Supreme Commander of the Alcian Royal Army and also a Legendary Ace, dubbed the "Ace of Explosive Strikes". He is Jail's adoptive father with a dark past, and acts doting towards him, going so far as to groom him to be his successor in the Royal Army, much to the dismay and jealousy of his other subordinates. He possessed three of the original Ballots. The large scar on his face was caused by the first attack of the Waste War 300 years ago, when he served as an instructor of the Special Military School #13 where the first Legendary Aces were developed together with Schmerman and Firenda. Despite acting strict and almost violent with his students, he was the only one who actually cares for them.
His initial Count was 280,000. His Ace ability grants him control of fire.
Schmerman Bach (シュメルマン=バッハ, Shumeruman Bahha)
Voiced by: Toshihiko Seki (Japanese); Jason Liebrecht (English)
Schmelman is a tall man with long hair, who was the Commander of the Special Service Unit (Also known as SSU), and held Mizuka and Doan under his command. His killing intent alone is enough to make an enemy surrender. Initially believed to be the main antagonist of the series, who manipulated the events of the story in order to regain control of all of the seven original Ballots, and gain ultimate control of the Althing and the whole Alcia. In truth, Schmerman who had been manipulating the events' present day is a clone created by Firenda, while the real Schmerman had been helping the protagonists from the shadow before resurfacing as a final antagonist, following Firenda's demise.
The real Schmerman was the leader of the Special Military School #13 300 years ago, and possessed the genes used to create the Legendary Aces. However, his inherent murderous tendencies caused all of the Aces to have them too. Despite this, he devised the "Alcian Plan" to bring the world out of the crisis, orchestrating the Waste War with the use of the Legendary Aces, and ultimately returning the world to peace under a single government. He took a special interest in Licht, whom he adopted as a son. During his military school days, he was shown to be very fond of his students, often reading folklore stories to them like a father to his children.
Firenda (フィレンダ) / Nicola (ニコラ, Nikora)
Voiced by: Kotono Mitsuishi (Firenda), Koji Yusa (Nikola) (Japanese); Jad Saxton (Firenda), Derick Snow (Nikola) (English)
Firenda is a smiling beautiful woman with extremely long hair who was a scientist and Lieutenant serving under Schmerman 300 years ago. She was the one responsible for creating the Aces by using Schmerman's genes. In truth, she was the main force behind the events of the main story in the present, aided by her shape-shifting and power-mimicking abilities, which she used to "steal from the whole world" as revenge for her misfortunes in life. She disguises herself as Nicola, a Special Service Unit operative disguising as a Royal Army soldier to observe and manipulate the events of the story towards her goals, and creates a Schmerman clone as her puppet king until he serves her purposes. "Firenda" is in fact a name of a young girl she killed and impersonated during her misfortuned childhood life.
While her initial Count of 47 was likely actually false, her true Count was based on the number of times she stole from others.
Saki Ichinose (一ノ瀬 咲, Ichinose Saki)
Voiced by: Miyu Kubota (Japanese); Jill Harris (English)
A brown-haired girl who was a member of Class A of Special Military School #13 300 years ago.
Genji Akui (阿久井 玄治, Akui Genji)
Voiced by: Yōhei Azakami (Japanese); Ian Sinclair (English)
A large young man with a thin mustache and beard who was a member of class A of Special Military School #13 300 years ago.
Kyouhei Suda (須田 恭平, Suda Kyōhei)
Voiced by: Tomohito Takatsuka (Japanese); Josh Grelle (English)
A young man with an undercut who was a member of class A of Special Military School #13 300 years ago.
Asumi Sumitani (住谷 愛純, Sumitani Asumi)
Voiced by: Yukimi Hayase (Japanese); Amanda Lee (English)
A long-black-haired girl who was a member of Class A of Special Military School #13 300 years ago.
Kyouka Narimiya (成宮 杏華, Narimiya Kyōka)
Voiced by: Tamaki Orie (Japanese); Leah Clark (English)
A long-bluish-haired girl who was a member of Class A of Special Military School #13 300 years ago.

== Media ==
=== Manga ===
Suu Minazuki launched the manga in Kadokawa Shoten's shōnen manga magazine on Monthly Shōnen Ace on December 26, 2014 and ended its serialization on April 26, 2022. On July 8, 2018, during their panel at Anime Expo, Yen Press announced that they had licensed the manga.

| No. | Original release date | Original ISBN | English release date | English ISBN |
|---|---|---|---|---|
| 1 | July 25, 2015 | 978-4-04-103329-6 | March 26, 2019 | 978-0-316-55256-1 |
1. "The Legendary Red Baron" (伝説の撃墜王, Densetsu no Gekitsui-ō; lit. 'The Legendary Aerial Ace') / Yen Press: The Fabled Ace; 2. "I Hate You" (だいっきらい, Daikkirai); 3. "I Can't Help That This Is My Uniform" (制服だから仕方ない, Seifukudakara Shikatanai) / Yen Press: That's Just How This Uniform Is
| 2 | July 25, 2015 | 978-4-04-103330-2 | March 26, 2019 | 978-0-316-55256-1 |
4. "Ballot Holder" (違法所持者(バロットホルター), Ihō Shojisha (Barotto Horutā; lit. Illegal Holder); 5. "Don't Apologize, Apologize" (謝るな、謝れ, Ayamaru na, Ayamare); 6. "Hunch" (勘, Kan) / Yen Press: Intuition; 7. "Abyss Demon" (アビスの悪魔, Abisu no Akuma) / Yen Press: Demon of the Abyss
| 3 | November 26, 2015 | 978-4-04-103331-9 | September 3, 2019 | 978-1-9753-8350-3 |
8. "Can't See Anything" (何も見えない, Nani mo Mienai) / Yen Press: Can't See a Thing; 9. "Plunderer" (プランダラ, Purandara); 10. "Gently Brush My Hair" (優しく髪をかきあげて, Yasashiku Kami o Kakiagete) / Yen Press: Gently Brush Back My Hair; 11. "Seriousness" (本気, Honki) Yen Press: Truth
| 4 | April 26, 2016 | 978-4-04-103913-7 | September 3, 2019 | 978-1-9753-8350-3 |
12. "Spy" (間者, Kanja); 13. "Enrollment Ceremony" (入校式, Nyūkō Shiki) / Yen Press: Entrance Ceremony; 14. "Rare Warrior" (希少な人間, Kishōna Ningen; lit. Rare Human); 15. "Fallen God" (落ちてきた神, Ochite Kita Kami)
| 5 | July 26, 2016 | 978-4-04-103914-4 | December 24, 2019 | 978-1-9753-8352-7 |
16. "A Full Stomach" (腹いっぱい, Haraippai) / Yen Press: A Full Tummy; 17. "Joint Responsibility" (連帯責任, Rentai Sekinin) / Yen Press: Shared Responsibility; 18. "We Go Over The Hills" (丘を越えゆこうよ, Oka o Koe Yukou Yo) / Yen Press: Over The Hill; 19. "The Promised War" (約束された戦争, Yakusoku sa Reta Sensō); Extra Chapter
| 6 | December 26, 2016 | 978-4-04-104877-1 | December 24, 2019 | 978-1-9753-8352-7 |
20. "Love Letter" (ラブレター, Rabu Retā); 21. "Discovery" (露見, Roken) / Yen Press: Exposed; 22. "A Creaking Sound" (きしむ音, Kishimu Oto) / Yen Press: Creaking Noise; 23. "A War For Abandoning" (廃棄するための戦争, Haiki Suru Tame no Sensō) / Yen Press: A War For Waste
| 7 | May 26, 2017 | 978-4-04-104878-8 | April 21, 2020 | 978-1-9753-8355-8 |
24. "Knight" (騎士, Kishi); 25. "Flash Baron" (閃撃の撃墜王, Sengeki no Gekitsui-ō); 26. "My Count Is..." (ボクのカウントは, Boku no Kaunto wa); 27. "The Choosing" (選民, Senmin)
| 8 | August 26, 2017 | 978-4-04-105995-1 | April 21, 2020 | 978-1-9753-8355-8 |
28. "An Affair" (浮気, Uwaki); 29. "Rain (1)" (雨1, Ame 1); 30. "Rain (2)" (雨2, Ame 2); 31. "Father" (父親, Chichioya)
| 9 | February 26, 2018 | 978-4-04-106562-4 | September 22, 2020 | 978-1-9753-1412-5 |
32. "Test" (試験, Shiken); 33. "Hero (1)" (英雄1, Eiyū 1); 34. "Hero (2)" (英雄2, Eiyū 2); 35. "Promise" (約束, Yakusoku)
| 10 | June 26, 2018 | 978-4-04-107048-2 | September 22, 2020 | 978-1-9753-1412-5 |
36. "By Change" (たまたま, Tamatama); 37. "Bach" (バッハ, Bahha); 38. "Foolish Plan" (愚帝, Gu Tei; lit. 'Foolish King'); 39. "Reunion" (再会, Saikai)
| 11 | November 26, 2018 | 978-4-04-107612-5 | December 15, 2020 | 978-1-9753-1415-6 |
40. "Parting" (别離, Betsuri); 41. "My Count Is" (僕のカウントは, Boku no Kaunto wa); 42. "Convene" (開会, Kaikai); 43. "Hopes Protected, Hopes Destroyed" (守られた望み、破られる望み, Mamora Reta Nozomi, Yabura Reru Nozomi)
| 12 | March 26, 2019 | 978-4-04-107613-2 | December 15, 2020 | 978-1-9753-1415-6 |
44. "Invasion" (侵略, Shinryaku); 45. "Rejoining" (帰還, Kikan); 46. "Other Way" (方法, Hōhō); 47. "Light" (光, Hikari)
| 13 | July 26, 2019 | 978-4-04-108694-0 | April 20, 2021 | 978-1-9753-1586-3 |
48. "Toy" (玩具, Omocha); 49. "Betrayal" (裏切り, Uragiri); 50. "Only One" (唯一人, Tada Hitori); 51. "Counterattack" (迎撃, Geigeki)
| 14 | December 26, 2019 | 978-4-04-108696-4 | April 20, 2021 | 978-1-9753-1586-3 |
52. "Angel" (天使, Tenshi); 53. "Regrets" (後悔, Kōkai); 54. "Alone" (孤独, Kodoku; lit. 'Loneliness'); 55. "Holding Back" (我慢, Gaman; lit. 'Patience')
| 15 | April 25, 2020 | 978-4-04-109336-8 | October 5, 2021 | 978-1-9753-3564-9 |
56. "Weakness" (弱点, Jakuten); 57. "Brave Young Man" (男の子, Otokonoko); 58. "Inheritance" (受け継ぐもの, Uketsugu Mono); 59. "Conviction" (信念, Shin Nen)
| 16 | August 26, 2020 | 978-4-04-109337-5 | October 5, 2021 | 978-1-9753-3564-9 |
60. "Like the Wind" (風のように, Kaze no Yōni); 61. "Declaration of War" (宣戦布告, Sensen Fukoku); 62. "Killing Intent" (殺意, Satsui); 63. "Evil" (悪, Aku)
| 17 | January 26, 2021 | 978-4-04-111102-4 | April 26, 2022 | 978-1-9753-4086-5 |
64. "Where I belong" (居場所, Ibasho); 65. "Parting" (別離, Betsuri); 66. "Only You Can Understand" (あなたにしかわからない, Anata ni Shika Wakaranai); 67. "I'm Relieved" (よかった, Yokatta)
| 18 | May 26, 2021 | 978-4-04-111381-3 | April 26, 2022 | 978-1-9753-4086-5 |
68. Who Should Die? (死ねべきは誰, Shinebeki wa Dare); 69. If My Beloved One Was Killed (愛する者を殺せば, Aisurumono o Koroseba); 70. Let Her Go (見逃してくれよ, Minoga Shite Kureyo); 71. Communication (通信, Tsūshin)
| 19 | October 26, 2021 | 978-4-04-111828-3 | December 13, 2022 | 978-1-9753-5119-9 |
72. Gentle, Peaceful and Promptly (穏やかに、安らかに、速やかに, Odayaka ni, Yasuraka ni, Sumiyaka ni); 73. Hesitate (ためらう, Tamerau); 74. Genji (玄治, Genji); 75. Don't Give Up, I Don't Want to Give Up (あきらめない、あきらめたくない, Akiramenai, Akirametakunai)
| 20 | February 26, 2022 | 978-4-04-111829-0 | December 13, 2022 | 978-1-9753-5119-9 |
76. Fair (フェア, Fea); 77. You're Still A Child (まだ子供, Mada Kodomo); 78. Method of Salvation (救う方法, Sukuu Hōhō); 79. Graduation Ceremony (卒業式, Sotsugyōshiki)
| 21 | June 24, 2022 | 978-4-04-112633-2 | October 17, 2023 | 978-1-9753-6475-5 |
80. The World's Enemy (全世界の敵, Zensekai no Teki); 81. Parent-Child (親子, Oyako); 82. A World of Peace, Happiness and Boring (平和で幸せなつまらない世界, Heiwade Shiawasena Tsumaranai Sekai); Extra Chapters

=== Anime ===
An anime adaptation was announced by Monthly Shōnen Ace on February 18, 2018. The television series was directed by Hiroyuki Kanbe and written by Masashi Suzuki, with animation by Geek Toys. Yuka Takashina, Yūki Fukuchi, and Hiroko Fukuda provided the character designs. Junichi Matsumoto composed the series' music. It aired from January 8 to June 24, 2020, on Tokyo MX, KBS, TVA, SUN, BS11, and AT-X. Miku Itō performed the series' first opening theme song "Plunderer," while Rina Honnizumi performed the series' first ending theme song "Countless Days". Itō performed the series' second opening theme song "Kokou no Hikari Lonely dark", while Honnizumi, Ari Ozawa, and Shizuka Itō performed the series' second ending theme song "Reason of Life". Funimation acquired the series for distribution, and streamed the series on FunimationNow in English speaking regions, and on AnimeLab in Australia and New Zealand. Funimation premiered the first two episodes of the series on YouTube in the United Kingdom, Ireland, Australia and New Zealand on December 8, 2019. Following Sony's acquisition of Crunchyroll, the series was moved to Crunchyroll. It ran for 24 episodes.
