= Suu Minazuki =

Japanese manga artist

Suu Minazuki 水無月 すう
- Area: Manga artist
- Notable works: Heaven's Lost Property, Plunderer, Watashi no Messiah-sama

Suu Minazuki (Japanese: 水無月 すう, Hepburn: Minazuki Suu) is a Japanese manga artist from Asakura, Fukuoka Prefecture best known for his fantasy comedy manga series Heaven's Lost Property, which has been adapted into an anime television series and two feature films.

== Works ==
Series	Year	Notes
Watashi no Messiah-sama	2002–2004	6 volumes released by Square Enix, and six volumes with the sequel included by Kadokawa Shoten
Judas	2004–2006	4 volumes
Heaven's Lost Property	2007–2014	20 volumes
Seven Ocean	2008	Single volume
Gou-dere Sora Nagihara	2008–2014	4 volumes
He~nshin!! - Sonata Birdie Rush	2008-2010	5 volumes
Daisuki desu!! Mahō Tenshi Cosmos	2010–2013	7 volumes
Plunderer	2014–2022	21 volumes
Dokunie Cooking	2017–2019	4 volumes
Excellent Property, Rejects for Residents	2022–2024	5 volumes
The Moon Cries at the Final Wish	2025-present	2 volumes
