= Misuzu =

- Gender: Female

Origin
- Origin: Japanese
- Meaning: Different meanings depending on the kanji used

Misuzu (written: 美鈴, 美寿々 or みすゞ) is a feminine Japanese given name. Notable people with the name include:

- Misuzu Akimoto (秋元 美鈴; born 1978), better known as Emi Kuroda, Japanese actress
- Misuzu Kaneko (金子 みすゞ; 1903–1930), Japanese poet and songwriter
- Misuzu Narita (成田 美寿々; born 1992), Japanese golfer
- Misuzu Ohara (小原 美鈴; born 1957), better known as Amii Ozaki, Japanese singer-songwriter
- Misuzu Togashi (富樫 美鈴), Japanese actress, voice actress and singer
- Misuzu Yamada (山田 美鈴), Japanese voice actress

== Fictional characters ==
- Misuzu Kamio (神尾 観鈴), a character in the visual novel Air
- Misuzu Kusakabe (草壁 美鈴), a character in the visual novel 11eyes: Tsumi to Batsu to Aganai no Shōjo
- Misuzu Misaka (御坂 美鈴), a character in the light novel series A Certain Magical Index
- Misuzu Moritani (森谷 美鈴), protagonist of the manga series Fragtime
- Misuzu Sonokata (其方 美鈴), a character in the manga series ēlDLIVE

== See also ==
- 3111 Misuzu, a main-belt asteroid
