= Super Cub (novel series) =

Japanese light novel series

- First light novel volume cover

スーパーカブ (Sūpā Kabu)
- Genre: Slice of life
- Novel series
- Written by: Tone Kōken
- Published by: Kakuyomu
- Original run: March 1, 2016 – December 2, 2021
Further information
Light novel
Written by	Tone Kōken
Illustrated by	Hiro
Published by	Kadokawa Shoten
Imprint	Kadokawa Sneaker Bunko
Original run	May 1, 2017 – April 1, 2022
Volumes	8 + 1
Manga
Written by	Tone Kōken
Illustrated by	Kanitan
Published by	Kadokawa Shoten
Magazine	Comic Newtype
Original run	December 29, 2017 – present
Volumes	12
Anime television series
Directed by	Toshiro Fujii
Written by	Toshizō Nemoto
Music by	Tomohisa Ishikawa; Zaq
Studio	Studio Kai
Licensed by	Crunchyroll (streaming); SA/SEA: Muse Communication
Original network	AT-X, Tokyo MX, TV Aichi, KBS Kyoto, BS11
Original run	April 7, 2021 – June 23, 2021
Episodes	12
Manga
Super Cub Rei
Written by	Sakae Saito
Published by	Kadokawa Shoten
Magazine	Comic Newtype
Original run	April 29, 2022 – January 12, 2024
Volumes	2
- icon

Super Cub (スーパーカブ, Sūpā Kabu) is a Japanese light novel series written by Tone Kōken and illustrated by Hiro. Originally serialized online as a web novel on Kakuyomu from March 2016 to December 2021, Kadokawa Shoten have released eight volumes and one reserve volume from May 2017 to April 2022 under their Kadokawa Sneaker Bunko label. A manga adaptation with art by Kanitan has been serialized online since December 2017 via Kadokawa Shoten's Comic Newtype manga website. It has been collected in 12 tankōbon volumes.

An anime television series adaptation by Studio Kai aired from April to June 2021 on multiple television networks across Japan and on Crunchyroll elsewhere. It has received generally positive reviews.

== Premise ==
Super Cub is set in the Mukawa area of Hokuto in Yamanashi Prefecture, Japan. The story follows Koguma, a lone wolf without hobbies or interests. After an encounter with a Honda Super Cub 50, she begins to grow and her world expands beyond herself. The novel promotional posters and the official novel site promote the commemoration of 100 million units sold for the Honda Super Cub.

The series focuses on Koguma, an orphan lone wolf without hobbies and friends. While riding her city bike to school one day, Koguma decides she would like to get a motorized bike of some sort. She resolves to get a Honda Super Cub from a local dealer. Because of this, she eventually makes friends with Reiko and Eniwa.

== Characters ==
Koguma (小熊)
Voiced by: Yuki Yomichi (Japanese); Jackie Lastra (English)
The main character, Koguma is a high school student in Hokuto with average grades in school. Her father died when she was juvenile, and her mother disappeared when Koguma entered high school. As Koguma does not have any relatives, she relies on a stipend for living and school expenses. Koguma lives by herself in an apartment building in front of Hinoharu Station. She does not have any hobbies or friends in school. When Koguma buys a Super Cub to use to commute to school, her life begins to change slowly. Due to her isolation, she has a brusque way of speaking with others.
Reiko (礼子)
Voiced by: Ayaka Nanase (Japanese); Dawn M. Bennett (English)
Reiko is a reserved and knowledgeable tall girl who is in the same class as Koguma. Her father is a city councilman, her mother manages a catering business in Hachiōji, and they both live in Tokyo. Reiko lives by herself in a log house the Mukawa area of Hokuto, an area with many vacation homes. She does perfectly at school, including sports. Although her favorite Cub is a restored MD90, it was wrecked during her second year summer vacation to Mount Fuji, and she subsequently acquired a CT110.
Shii Eniwa (恵庭椎, Eniwa Shii)
Voiced by: Natsumi Hioka (Japanese); Skyler Davenport (English)
A classmate of Koguma and Reiko, Shii was in charge of the annual cultural festival. She has medium-length hair that is depicted as pale bluish-gray in images from the novels and manga, but grayish in the anime. Although Hiro illustrates her with a mole under her right eye, Kanitan omits this in his illustrations for the manga. She is slightly shorter than Koguma, and has not changed in height since junior high school.

== Media ==
=== Web serialization ===
Super Cub was originally serialized online as a web novel on Kakuyomu from March 2016 to December 2021, before being picked up for publication as light novels by Kadokawa beginning in May 2017.

=== Light novels ===
No.	Release date	ISBN
1	May 1, 2017	978-4-04-105663-9
2	October 1, 2017	978-4-04-105960-9
3	May 1, 2018	978-4-04-106466-5
4	December 1, 2018	978-4-04-107081-9
5	July 1, 2019	978-4-04-107082-6
6	December 1, 2019	978-4-04-108919-4
reserve	November 1, 2020	978-4-04-110871-0
7	March 31, 2021	978-4-04-110872-7
8	April 1, 2022	978-4-04-112036-1

=== Manga ===
A manga adaptation with art by Kanitan has been serialized online since December 2017 via Kadokawa Shoten's Comic Newtype manga website. Its chapters have been collected in 12 tankōbon volumes.

No.	Japanese release date	Japanese ISBN
1	May 25, 2018	978-4-04-106961-5
2	December 10, 2018	978-4-04-107852-5
3	August 10, 2019	978-4-04-108468-7
4	March 10, 2020	978-4-04-109032-9
5	February 10, 2021	978-4-04-111087-4
6	September 25, 2021	978-4-04-111558-9
7	September 9, 2022	978-4-04-112929-6
8	April 10, 2023	978-4-04-113485-6
9	February 9, 2024	978-4-04-114608-8
10	November 9, 2024	978-4-04-115479-3
11	October 10, 2025	978-4-04-116585-0
12	November 10, 2026	978-4-04-118002-0

==== Super Cub Rei ====
A spin-off manga by Sakae Saito, titled Super Cub Rei, was serialized on the Comic Newtype website from April 29, 2022, to January 12, 2024. The manga focuses on the character Reiko years before she met Koguma and Shii.

No.	Japanese release date	Japanese ISBN
1	October 25, 2022	978-4-04-112930-2
2	February 9, 2024	978-4-04-113486-3

=== Anime ===
An anime television series adaptation by Studio Kai was announced on November 20, 2019. The series was directed by Toshiro Fujii, with Toshizō Nemoto handling series composition, Tōru Imanishi designing the characters, and Tomohisa Ishikawa and ZAQ composing the music. It aired from April 7 to June 23, 2021, on AT-X, Tokyo MX, TV Aichi, KBS Kyoto, and BS11. The opening theme song, "Mahō no Kaze" (まほうのかぜ; lit. 'Magical Wind'), was performed by Akane Kumada, while the ending theme song, "Haru e no Dengon" (春への伝言; lit. 'A Message to the Wind'), was performed by the main cast members Yuki Yomichi, Ayaka Nanase, and Natsumi Hioka. The series ran for 12 episodes. Funimation streamed the series, releasing new episodes on Wednesdays.

A Blu-ray box set containing all 12 episodes in the series was released in Japan on August 25, 2021. A Blu-ray collection with both the original Japanese audio and an English dub was released in North America by Funimation on May 31, 2022.

==== Episodes ====
No.	Title (Note: All English titles are taken from the Funimation release.)	Directed by	Storyboarded by	Original release date
1	"The Girl with Nothing"; Transliteration: "Nainai no Onna-no-ko" (Japanese: ないないの女の子)	Yūjirō Abe	Toshiro Fujii	April 7, 2021
Koguma, a girl who lives alone without parental support and little money, struggles while pedaling her bicycle on her daily commute to school. Noticing the motorcycles passing her, she goes to a nearby motorcycle shop. She is about to leave, due to the high prices, when the owner offers her a used green Super Cub for 10,000 yen, due to its three previous owners "having been killed riding it," according to Shino, the shop owner. Koguma buys it anyway, gets a motorcycle riding license, and the owner also gives her a free helmet and riding gloves. She takes it riding that night to a convenience store, only to be unable to start the bike. Consulting the owner's manual, she finds that her Cub has run out of fuel, and switches to the reserve tank, enough to get her to the nearest gasoline station.
2	"Reiko" (Japanese: 礼子)	Atsushi Usui	Toshiro Fujii	April 14, 2021
Koguma gets to know more about her Cub, such as finding its helmet holder. In a home economics class, she makes a drawstring bag for her helmet and gloves. When her classmates ask her about her bag, she mentions her Cub, which draws the attention of a girl, Reiko, who sits a few seats away from her. Koguma initially agrees to show Reiko her Super Cub but, feeling awkward, later tries to leave without being noticed. She returns to fetch her drawstring bag, but Reiko has already got it for her. Reiko praises her Cub and riding gear, and shows that she also rides a Cub ― a modified MD90 Postal Cub ― to school. Despite Koguma's awkwardness, the girls start eating lunch together near their Cubs. Reiko talks of the possibilities a Cub could give her, such as the freedom to travel anywhere. After school that day, Koguma travels to a supermarket beyond the gas station she usually visits. She then looks forward to her next side trip with her Cub.
3	"Things Received"; Transliteration: "Moratta Mono" (Japanese: もらったもの)	Kazuya Aiura	Kazuya Aiura	April 21, 2021
Thanks to Reiko's connections, Koguma is able to get a motorcycle box for her Cub from one that's about to be turned into parts. In addition, one of her teachers gives her a front basket that he no longer needs. Koguma finds the wind hurts her face when riding above 35 kph, so she asks Reiko for help. The visors they find online are too expensive, but Koguma notices the safety goggles worn by one of the construction workers renovating the library. She visits the local hardware store the construction worker mentioned and buys some goggles as well as a chain lock. The feeling of riding with the goggles is so good that she even dreams of it that night. Reiko notices the grin on Koguma's face the next morning, saying that it is the feeling of wearing a visored helmet for the first time. Later that day, Reiko gives Koguma her phone number.
4	"The Job"; Transliteration: "Arubaito" (Japanese: アルバイト)	Fumiaki Kataoka	Kazuya Aiura, Yuki Ogawa	April 28, 2021
Koguma gets her first summer job as a courier for her high school. During that time she learns how and when to change the engine oil on her Cub. After getting soaked by a summer rainstorm, she reluctantly buys an expensive rainsuit. She racks up over a thousand kilometers on her Cub, while experiencing riding beyond her usual route. On the evening of her last day on the job, Reiko, coming back from a long riding trip, invites her over to her cabin.
5	"Reiko's Summer"; Transliteration: "Reiko no Natsu" (Japanese: 礼子の夏)	Arata Nishizuki	Toshiro Fujii	May 5, 2021
As Koguma takes her Cub into Reiko's log house, she sees her Postal Cub in a battered shape. As they talk over okonomiyaki, Reiko tells Koguma of her summer vacation. She was working at the resupply base of the Subashiri Trail at the foot of Mount Fuji as an assistant and scout ahead of the resupply vehicle's ascent to the summit. However, her real reason for applying for the job is to try to climb the summit with her Postal Cub, something only two people, with high-performance off-road bikes, have previously done. Due to her inexperience, rough terrain and altitude sickness, she crashes on every attempt. Her boss, while supportive, wonders why she keeps on attempting it. On her final attempt, she crashes a few meters from the summit, cracking her Postal Cub's engine. She is happy, nonetheless, to find herself near the summit, as her Cub is carried down aboard the trail transport vehicle. After hearing her story, Koguma thinks climbing the mountain on a motorbike as ridiculous. Later, Koguma is surprised to find out that her "cursed" Super Cub has not killed anyone, as Reiko knows about the origins of her Super Cub: the first owner died from drinking too much, the second one fled town to escape his debts, and the third one lost his license. Koguma spends the night at Reiko's place. The next day Koguma tells Reiko that she is aiming for her Class 1 Drivers' License (what Koguma currently has is only a permit), with a week left in their vacation.
6	"My Cub"; Transliteration: "Watashi no Kabu" (Japanese: 私のカブ)	Kazuya Aiura	Kazuya Aiura, Yoshimasa Hiraike	May 12, 2021
By the end of summer vacation, Koguma gets her license and has Shino-san modify her Super Cub's engine, re-boring it to increase its power, turning it into a Type-II Motorcycle. Koguma's class goes on a class trip to Kamakura, but she gets a fever on the morning of their departure, only to recover a few hours later. Mortified, she suddenly gets the idea of riding her Cub to Kamakura, via the Subashiri Trail and through the Shonan Bullet Road, arriving at the inn just before the class tour bus, to the surprise of her classmates. Koguma gets a scolding but Reiko defends her, and she is allowed to continue with the trip. The next day, during free time, the two sneak out to ride in tandem along the Shonan Bullet Road. Reiko reveals that her Postal Cub is too heavily damaged during her mountain climbing attempts at Fuji to be repaired, and she is planning to buy a Hunter Cub. Reiko says it is a discontinued model, but parts are ubiquitous, as are those for Koguma's Super Cub. Kogama says that's good news because she wants to ride it forever.
7	"The Girl of Summer-Sky Aqua"; Transliteration: "Natsuzora no Iro, Mizuiro no Shōjo" (Japanese: 夏空の色、水色の少女)	Hisashi Isogawa	Hisashi Isogawa	May 19, 2021
While Reiko is talking about breaking in her new Hunter Cub, the committee for their class' Italian-themed school festival bar—which is organized by Shii Eniwa—announce that they need help moving materials and equipment from Kofu, since the teacher is unable to drive them. The two plan to ignore this, but Koguma takes it as a challenge when a committee member says motorbikes cannot carry fragile equipment. Koguma borrows a rig from Reiko that allows for carrying fragile equipment, while Reiko ties a hauling cart to her more powerful Hunter Cub for the heavier items. They transport the equipment and the bar is a success. Shii thanks the two with a cup of coffee each, and expresses her own desire to ride a Cub sometime in the future. While returning the cups, Koguma reflects that Shii, who initially appeared a "pale, washed out blue" is more the pale blue of a summer sky.
8	"Shii's Place"; Transliteration: "Shii no Basho" (Japanese: 椎の場所)	Atsushi Usui	Atsushi Usui	May 26, 2021
Shii invites Koguma and Reiko to her parents' cafe, which—despite its French name and Tyrolean-style exterior—serves German bread and Italian espresso inside an American diner-themed interior. They also meet Shii's father and mother, who are obsessed with Germany and America respectively, which Shii is seemingly embarrassed by despite her own dream of running an Italian espresso bar in the future. Shii's father treats them to some coffee as thanks for helping Shii during the cultural festival. Koguma and Reiko became regulars at the cafe. Meanwhile, the pair prepare themselves for winter by buying accessories for their Cubs to protect them from the cold. Reiko does not initially like the gaudy handlebar covers, but find them effective and eventually buys a pair.
9	"In Ice"; Transliteration: "Kōri no Naka" (Japanese: 氷の中)	Shigatsu Yoshikawa	Hiroshi Tamada	June 2, 2021
Slowly, Koguma and Reiko are able to winterize their Cubs. During lunch break, Shii, who started hanging around with them, gives her mostly unused abrasive wool coat to the two. With their home economics teacher's help, they turn the coat into a liner for Koguma's coat, stockings for Reiko, and a thermos cozy for Shii. They were initially hesitant to install windshields on their Cubs, but decide to get and install one after trying a Cub with a windshield installed.
10	"Snow"; Transliteration: "Yuki" (Japanese: 雪)	Shigatsu Yoshikawa	Hidetoshi Namura	June 9, 2021
Koguma is finding it difficult to ride on the snow as winter break arrives. On her way to Reiko's place, she sees Shii riding her bicycle into town entering the cat trail by the railway. Reiko, who has also installed leg shields on her Hunter Cub, has obtained tire chains for their Cubs from a business that was closing. The two of them test the new tire chains riding on a snow-covered field. Later, Reiko and Koguma visit Shii's cafe and notice she has given part of it an Italian theme. They are told by her father that she aspires to be more like them and has been riding her Alex Moulton bicycle more often as a consequence, using it for shopping trips and scouring the town for anything that would be useful for her Italian cafe project. That evening, as Koguma is about to enter her apartment, she receives a call for help from Shii, who has fallen into the river below the trail she has been using.
11	"A Distant Spring"; Transliteration: "Tōi Haru" (Japanese: 遠い春)	Fumiaki Kataoka	Kazuya Aiura	June 16, 2021
Koguma finds Shii, helps her out of the river and takes her to her apartment by carrying her on the Cub's front basket. She also calls Reiko to recover Shii's phone and bicycle from the river, and to meet them at her apartment. They spend the night in Koguma's apartment, where Shii gets upset when Reiko tells her that her bicycle is too damaged to be repaired. Shii expresses her dislike of winter, pleading to Koguma to make it spring, something Koguma says that ever her Cub cannot do. They return Shii to her home the next day, to the relief of her parents. School begins again, and Reiko and Koguma notices that Shii's Italian cafe project seems to be put on hold as Shii goes to school in a granny bike that is unsuited to her. After final exams, while the two are visiting Shii's cafe, Koguma mentions the cherry blossom flowers have bloomed in Kagoshima. Reiko suggests a trip as a way of cheering Shii up. Koguma begins to refuse, but changes her mind when she recalls that Shii was the girl who previously overtook her when she was struggling on her old bicycle, indirectly introducing her to her Cub. Koguma realizes that she has been the one chasing after Shii, not the other way around.
12	"Super Cub"; Transliteration: "Sūpā Kabu" (Japanese: スーパーカブ)	Toshiro Fujii, Shigatsu Yoshikawa, Hisashi Isogawa, Kazuya Aiura	Toshiro Fujii	June 23, 2021
Koguma, Reiko, and Shii go on a road trip with the Super Cubs to see the cherry blossom flowers in Kagoshima, with Shii riding in tandem with Reiko. They travel through several prefectures, passing by sights such as Lake Biwa, Tottori Sand Dunes, and Sakurajima. Their trip ends at Cape Sata, where the cherry blossom flowers are in full bloom. They return to Hokuto to find the winterscape gone and the cherry blossoms have arrived. A few days later, Shii introduces her new Little Cub to Koguma and Reiko. Koguma ponders in retrospect how her life changed after she got her Super Cub.

== Reception ==
The Asahi Shimbun described the first novel as a realistic story told with simple and honest language, showing the changes in the life of Koguma as she expands and explores the world opened up to her after she buys the Super Cub.

The anime series received generally positive reviews. Briana Lawrence at The Mary Sue described the first five episodes as "a warm hug delivered at 20 MPH", praising the series for its celebrations of small victories in the life of Koguma and how those change the character's outlook on life. At Anime News Network, Mercedez Clewis called it "the anime to watch this year", going on to call the first episode "a masterpiece of a premiere", full of "a lot of truly beautiful moments where...[the art and colors]...come together to make really striking, evocative scenes".

Another Anime Review was mixed regarding the setup of the series. While praising the beautiful animation, they complained about possibly "lazy writing and/or sloppy production" due to Koguma's living situation. However, they praised the overarching plot of Koguma finding her world opening up due to her purchase of the Super Cub bike, ending with "There's a lot to love here, folks." In his review for Motor Biscuit, a motorcycle enthusiast website, Matthew Skwarczek praised the details showing Koguma learning how to use and take care of her bike, stating the "show gets motorcycle riders".

== See also ==
- Akebi's Sailor Uniform, a manga series written and illustrated by Hiro.
- Katana Maidens: Toji No Miko, an anime whose manga adaptation was written and illustrated by Sakae Saito.
- Touring After the Apocalypse, a manga series written and illustrated by Sakae Saito.
