= Classroom for Heroes =

Japanese light novel series

- First light novel volume cover, featuring Blade (left) and Earnest Flaming (right)

英雄教室 (Eiyū Kyōshitsu)
- Genre: Fantasy, slice of life
- Light novel
- Written by: Shin Araki
- Illustrated by: Haruyuki Morisawa
- Published by: Shueisha
- English publisher: NA: Yen Press
- Imprint: Dash X Bunko
- Original run: January 2015 – present
- Volumes: 15
- Manga

Eiyū Kyōshitsu: Honoo no Empress
- Written by: Shin Araki
- Illustrated by: Takashi Minakuchi
- Published by: Shueisha
- Magazine: Ultra Jump
- Original run: February 2015 – August 2015
- Volumes: 1
- Manga

Hero Classroom
- Written by: Shin Araki
- Illustrated by: Koara Kishida
- Published by: Square Enix
- English publisher: NA: Comikey
- Magazine: Monthly Shōnen Gangan
- Original run: September 12, 2016 – October 9, 2026
- Volumes: 23
- Anime television series
- Directed by: Keiichiro Kawaguchi
- Produced by: Yasutaka Kimura; Yoshinori Hasegawa; Rei Torii; Yuuki Tezuka; Mayumi Watanabe; Ereka Wang
- Written by: Naoki Hayashi
- Music by: Kōtarō Nakagawa
- Studio: Actas
- Licensed by: Crunchyroll
- Original network: Tokyo MX, Sun TV, KBS Kyoto, BS11
- Original run: July 9, 2023 – September 24, 2023
- Episodes: 12
- icon

Classroom for Heroes (英雄教室, Eiyū Kyōshitsu) is a Japanese fantasy light novel series written by Shin Araki and illustrated by Haruyuki Morisawa. Shueisha have published fifteen volumes since January 2015 under their Dash X Bunko imprint. A manga adaptation with art by Takashi Minakuchi titled Eiyū Kyōshitsu: Honoo no Empress was serialized in Shueisha's seinen manga magazine Ultra Jump between February and August 2015 and was collected in a single tankōbon volume. A second manga adaptation with art by Koara Kishida titled as the light novel was serialized via Square Enix's shōnen manga magazine Monthly Shōnen Gangan from September 2016 to October 2026. It has been collected in twenty-three tankōbon volumes. The light novel is licensed by Yen Press. The second manga is licensed digitally in North America by Comikey under the title Hero Classroom. An anime television series adaptation by Actas aired from July to September 2023.

== Plot ==
A long time ago, a hero defeated a demon lord who was terrorizing the world, and then Rosewood Academy was created to train future heroes. In the present, Earnest Flaming is the top student of the academy, earning the nickname "Empress of Flames". One day, Earnest is irritated when she meets Blade, a carefree slacker of a transfer student who is roughly equal to her in power and fighting skills. The king asks her to supervise Blade and show him around the academy. Thus begins the students' quest to become true heroes.

== Characters ==
Blade (ブレイド, Bureido)
Voiced by: Nobunaga Shimazaki (drama CD), Reiji Kawashima (anime)
Earnest Flaming (アーネスト・フレイミング, Ānesuto Fureimingu)
Voiced by: Mikako Komatsu (drama CD), Misuzu Yamada (anime)
Sophie (ソフィ, Sofi)
Voiced by: Nao Tōyama (anime)
Cú Chulainn (クーフーリン, Kūfūrin)
Voiced by: Hina Kino (anime)
Claire (クレア, Kurea)
Voiced by: Eri Yukimura (anime)
Yessica (イェシカ, Yeshika)
Voiced by: Haruka Shiraishi (anime)
Maria (マリア) / Mao (マオ)
Voiced by: Sarah Emi Bridcutt (anime)
Iona (イオナ)
Voiced by: Aya Uchida (anime)
Clay/Clade (クレイ, Kurei)
Voiced by: Shūichi Uchida (anime)
Kassim (カシム, Kashimu)
Voiced by: Tomohiro Ōno (anime)
Leonard (レナード, Renādo)
Voiced by: Tomohito Takatsuka (anime)
Eliza Maxwell (イライザ, Iraiza)
Voiced by: Konomi Kohara (anime)
King Gilgamesh Soulmaker (ギルガメッシュ, Girugamesshu)
Voiced by: Rikiya Koyama (anime)
Asmodeus (アスモデウス, Asumodeusu)
Voiced by: Tetsu Inada (anime)
Une (アン, An)
Voiced by: Kanna Nakamura
Deux (ドゥ, Du)
Voiced by: Natsumi Takamori
Trois (トロワ, Torowa)
Voiced by: Yoshino Aoyama
Quatre (カトル, Katoru)
Voiced by: Saya Aizawa
Cinq (サンク, Sanku)
Voiced by: Nene Hieda

== Media ==
=== Light novel ===
During their panel at New York Comic Con 2023, Yen Press announced that they had licensed the light novel.

No.	Original release date	Original ISBN	English release date	English ISBN
1	January 23, 2015	978-4-08-631022-2	March 19, 2024	978-1-9753-7868-4
2	May 22, 2015	978-4-08-631045-1	July 23, 2024	978-1-9753-7870-7
3	September 25, 2015	978-4-08-631069-7	November 19, 2024	978-1-9753-7872-1
4	January 22, 2016	978-4-08-631095-6	May 20, 2025	978-1-9753-7874-5
5	May 25, 2016	978-4-08-631113-7	December 9, 2025	978-1-9753-7876-9
6	September 21, 2016	978-4-08-631138-0	April 14, 2026	978-1-9753-7878-3
7	January 25, 2017	978-4-08-631166-3	December 8, 2026	979-8-8554-3974-8
8	May 25, 2017	978-4-08-631185-4	—	—
9	September 22, 2017	978-4-08-631203-5	—	—
10	January 25, 2018	978-4-08-631223-3	—	—
11	July 25, 2018	978-4-08-631250-9	—	—
12	September 24, 2021	978-4-08-631432-9	—	—
13	July 22, 2022	978-4-08-631479-4	—	—
14	June 23, 2023	978-4-08-631510-4	—	—
15	December 22, 2023	978-4-08-631534-0	—	—

=== Manga ===
A manga adaptation with art by Takashi Minakuchi titled Eiyū Kyōshitsu: Honoo no Empress (英雄教室─炎の女帝, Eiyū Kyōshitsu: Honō no Enpuresu; "Classroom for Heroes: Empress of Flame") was serialized in Shueisha's seinen manga magazine Ultra Jump between February and August 2015 and was collected in a single tankōbon volume.

No.	Release date	ISBN
1	September 18, 2015	978-4-08-890299-9

A second manga adaptation with art by Koara Kishida titled as the light novel was serialized in Square Enix's Monthly Shōnen Gangan magazine from September 12, 2016, to October 9, 2026. It has been collected in twenty-three tankōbon volumes. The second manga adaptation is licensed digitally in North America by Comikey under the title Hero Classroom.

No.	Release date	ISBN
1	January 25, 2017	978-4-7575-5229-6
2	July 22, 2017	978-4-7575-5406-1
3	January 22, 2018	978-4-7575-5585-3
4	May 25, 2018	978-4-7575-5717-8
5	November 22, 2018	978-4-7575-5909-7
6	March 22, 2019	978-4-7575-6050-5
7	September 12, 2019	978-4-7575-6283-7
8	February 12, 2020	978-4-7575-6496-1
9	June 12, 2020	978-4-7575-6678-1
10	October 12, 2020	978-4-7575-6893-8
11	February 12, 2021	978-4-7575-7087-0
12	June 11, 2021	978-4-7575-7314-7
13	October 12, 2021	978-4-7575-7524-0
14	March 11, 2022	978-4-7575-7805-0
15	August 10, 2022	978-4-7575-8073-2
16	June 12, 2023	978-4-7575-8607-9
17	July 12, 2023	978-4-7575-8657-4
18	September 12, 2023	978-4-7575-8783-0
19	April 12, 2024	978-4-7575-9147-9
20	October 10, 2024	978-4-7575-9466-1
21	May 12, 2025	978-4-7575-9845-4
22	November 12, 2025	978-4-301-00161-4
23	May 12, 2026	978-4-301-00514-8

=== Anime ===
An anime television series adaptation was announced on the twelfth volume of the light novel on September 24, 2021. It is produced by Actas and directed by Keiichiro Kawaguchi, with Naoki Hayashi writing the scripts, Kōsuke Kawamura designing the characters, and Kōtarō Nakagawa composing the music. It aired from July 9 to September 24, 2023, on Tokyo MX and other networks. The opening theme song is "Bravery? Naturally?" by VTuber Kaede Higuchi, while the ending theme song is "Another Self" by Akane Kumada. Crunchyroll streamed the series.

No.	Title	Directed by	Written by	Storyboarded by	Original release date
1	"Earnest"; Transliteration: "Ānesuto" (Japanese: アーネスト)	Keiichiro Kawaguchi	Naoki Hayashi	Keiichiro Kawaguchi	July 9, 2023
2	"Sophie"; Transliteration: "Sofi" (Japanese: ソフィ)	Hideaki Nakano	Naoki Hayashi	Hideaki Nakano	July 16, 2023
3	"Cu Chulainn"; Transliteration: "Kūfūrin" (Japanese: クーフーリン)	Takahiko Shirai	Naoki Hayashi	Jun Takada	July 23, 2023
4	"The Rosewood Academy Training Exercise"; Transliteration: "Rōzuuddo Gakuen no Kunren" (Japanese: ローズウッド学園の訓練)	Hiroaki Kudō	Naoki Hayashi	Hiroyuki Shimazu	July 30, 2023
5	"The Demon King's Daughter"; Transliteration: "Maō no Musume" (Japanese: 魔王の娘)	Masakazu Yoshimoto	Naoki Hayashi	Keiichiro Kawaguchi; Jun Takada	August 6, 2023
6	"The General and the Sacred Bird"; Transliteration: "Shōgun to Kaichō" (Japanese: 将軍と怪鳥)	Hiroaki Kudō; Hideaki Nakano	Naoki Hayashi	Hiroyuki Shimazu	August 13, 2023
7	"The Springtime of Life at Rosewood Academy"; Transliteration: "Rōzuuddo Gakuen no Seishun" (Japanese: ローズウッド学園の青春)	Kōsuke Shimotori	Naoki Hayashi	Hideaki Nakano	August 20, 2023
8	"Less Than Human"; Transliteration: "Ningen Miman" (Japanese: 人間未満)	Takahiko Shirai	Naoki Hayashi	Takahiko Shirai	August 27, 2023
9	"The Superorganism Suppression Committee"; Transliteration: "Chōseibutsu Tōbatsu Iinkai" (Japanese: 超生物討伐委員会)	Satoshi Saga	Naoki Hayashi	Hideaki Nakano	September 3, 2023
10	"I'm Looking for Something Tastier than Me"; Transliteration: "Ore yori Umai Mono ni Ai ni Iku" (Japanese: 俺よりうまいものに遭いに行く)	Hiroaki Kudō	Naoki Hayashi	Naoki Ōhira	September 10, 2023
11	"The Sophie Series (Part 1)"; Transliteration: "Sofi Shirīzu (Zenpen)" (Japanese: ソフィシリーズ（前編）)	Masakazu Yoshimoto	Naoki Hayashi	Naoki Ōhira	September 17, 2023
12	"The Sophie Series (Part 2)"; Transliteration: "Sofi Shirīzu (Kōhen)" (Japanese: ソフィシリーズ（後編）)	Hideaki Nakano	Naoki Hayashi	Keiichiro Kawaguchi	September 24, 2023

== See also ==
- GJ Club—another light novel series by the same author
