= Reign of the Seven Spellblades =

Japanese light novel series and its adaptations

- First light novel volume cover featuring Oliver Horn (right) and Nanao Hibiya (left)

七つの魔剣が支配する (Nanatsu no Maken ga Shihai Suru)
- Genre: Fantasy
- Light novel
- Written by: Bokuto Uno
- Illustrated by: Ruria Miyuki
- Published by: ASCII Media Works
- English publisher: NA: Yen Press
- Imprint: Dengeki Bunko
- Original run: September 7, 2018 – present
- Volumes: 15 + 1 extra
- Manga
- Written by: Bokuto Uno
- Illustrated by: Sakae Esuno
- Published by: Kadokawa Shoten
- English publisher: NA: Yen Press
- Magazine: Monthly Shōnen Ace
- Original run: May 25, 2019 – November 25, 2023
- Volumes: 8
- Anime television series
- Directed by: Masato Matsune
- Produced by: Takema Okamura; Tomoyuki Oowada; Fumihiro Ozawa; Akihiro Sotokawa; Takuji Wada; Satoshi Tabata; Marco Kenzo Tomoshige
- Written by: Shōgo Yasukawa
- Music by: Kujira Yumemi
- Studio: J.C.Staff
- Licensed by: Crunchyroll
- Original network: Tokyo MX, BS11
- Original run: July 8, 2023 – October 14, 2023
- Episodes: 15
- icon

Reign of the Seven Spellblades (七つの魔剣が支配する, Nanatsu no Maken ga Shihai Suru) is a Japanese light novel series written by Bokuto Uno and illustrated by Ruria Miyuki. ASCII Media Works have published the series since September 2018 under their Dengeki Bunko imprint. A manga adaptation with art by Sakae Esuno was serialized in Kadokawa Shoten's shōnen manga magazine Monthly Shōnen Ace from May 2019 to November 2023. Both the light novel and manga are licensed in North America by Yen Press. An anime television series adaptation by J.C.Staff aired from July to October 2023.

== Premise ==
Springtime at Kimberly Magic Academy, when new students begin their first year. One boy, clad in black robes with a white cane and sword strapped to his hip, approaches the prestigious school. This young man, Oliver Horn, must form a bond with a katana-wielding girl named Nanao Hibiya and four other students if he's to survive the dangers he's to face at this school — a seven-year institution where, on average, twenty percent of students who enroll are "consumed by the spell" before they graduate.

The series takes its name from the in-universe concept of a "spellblade" (魔剣 maken), described in volume 1 of the light novels as "A strike that can be neither dodged nor blocked, thereby guaranteeing death."

== Characters ==
=== Sword Roses ===
Oliver Horn (オリバー・ホーン, Oribā Hōn)
Voiced by: Atsushi Tamaru (Japanese); Drew Breedlove (English)
A jack-of-all-trades mage and the son of Chloe "Two-Blade" Halford, Oliver is a down-to-earth person at heart. He always tries pursuing friendly conclusions to fights but is able to pick up his wand and athame if he has no other choice but to do so. His true purpose for attending Kimberly is to murder the seven members of Kimberly's faculty who had a hand in the death of his mother.
Oliver inherited from his mother the 4th spellblade, "Angustavia", which gives him the ability to reverse causality, choosing the desired outcome of his attack before performing the actions necessary to reach it. However, this technique takes a heavy toll into his body, to the point that he may die if using it three times in sequence.
Nanao Hibiya (響谷(ヒビヤ) 奈々緒(ナナオ), Hibiya Nanao) (Note: Nanao initially names herself in Eastern name order, with kanji given in the Japanese edition, but uses Western name order and katakana like the rest of the cast from then on.)
Voiced by: Yuka Nukui (Japanese); Veronica Laux (English)
Hailing from Tourikueisen in the distant country of Yamatsu, Nanao is a samurai who was offered a second chance at life by Theodore McFarlane, a politically prominent mage and part-time lecturer at Kimberly. She attends Kimberly at his behest and finds a new purpose in life in crossing blades with Oliver.
Nanao eventually learns a new, seventh spellblade that gives her the ability to instantly strike from a distance, surpassing the boundaries of space and time.
Katie Aalto (カティ・アールト, Kati Āruto)
Voiced by: Hitomi Ōwada (Japanese); Jill Harris (English)
A daughter of well known advocates for the civil rights of demihumans. Her enthusiastic support on that subject brings her into conflict with teachers and some other students.
Michela McFarlane (ミシェーラ・マクファーレン, Mishēra Makufāren)
Voiced by: Misuzu Yamada (Japanese); Sara Ragsdale (English)
The daughter of Theodore McFarlane. She has ringlets in her blond hair, which is a family trait. Goes by "Chela" for short.
In volume 2 (episode 11 of the anime), she's revealed to be a half-elf on her mother's side, and can temporarily boost her magic power by transforming into an elven form.
Pete Reston (ピート・レストン, Pīto Resuton)
Voiced by: Riho Sugiyama (Japanese); Lexi Nieto (English)
Neither of his parents have any magic abilities so some students look down on him as just an "ordinary". He uses his athame in his left hand. He can usually be found reading a book.
In volume 2 (episode 7 of the anime) he is discovered to be a "Reversi" capable of switching his physical sex.
Guy Greenwood (ガイ・グリーンウッド, Gai Gurīn'uddo)
Voiced by: Shinsuke Sugawara (Japanese); Matthew Elkins (English)
He comes from a family of farmers so he has no problem using magical creatures for just their useful parts.

=== Classmates ===
Richard Andrews (リチャード・アンドリューズ, Richādo Andoryūzu)
Voiced by: Shōya Chiba (Japanese); Gerard Caster (English)
A childhood friend of Michela's, Richard hails from the Andrews family, a magical lineage of equal importance to the McFarlane's and as a result, has been constantly compared to Michela. This culminates in their relationship going sour, especially with the addition of Oliver into the picture. He quickly develops a rivalry with Oliver but is later made to understand how narrow his worldview was.
Tullio Rossi (トゥリオ = ロッシ, Turio Rosshi)
Voiced by: Daichi Kanbara
A young man from the land of Ytalli who is entirely self-taught at sword arts. In volume 2 (episode 8 of the anime) he starts a dueling tournament among the first-year students in hopes of being named the best fighter among them.
Stacy Cornwallis (ステイシー = コーンウォリス, Suteishī Kōnworisu)
Voiced by: Kaori Maeda
A relative of Michela's who joins Rossi's tournament in hopes of getting one over on her.
Fay Willock (フェイ = ウィロック, Fei Wirokku)
Voiced by: Tatsumaru Tachibana
Stacy's attendant and fighting partner, and eventual love interest by volume 9. He is half-human, half-werewolf.
Joseph Albright (ジョセフ = オルブライト, Josefu Oruburaito)
Voiced by: Makoto Furukawa
An ambitious young man from a lineage of mage warriors who also joins Rossi's tournament.

=== Upperclassmen ===
Ophelia Salvadori (オフィーリア・サルヴァドーリ, Ofīria Saruvadōri)
Voiced by: Ai Kayano
A female fourth-year student with succubus ancestry known for preying on male underclassmen in the Labyrinth. She has a tragic past of child sex abuse.
Carlos Whitrow (カルロス・ウィットロウ, Karurosu Wittorō)
Voiced by: Kazutomi Yamamoto
A non-binary fifth-year employed as a school prefect. Their family is allied to the Salvadoris and they have known Ophelia since they were tweens.
Alvin Godfrey (アルヴィン・ゴッドフレイ, Aruvin Goddofurei)
Voiced by: Satoshi Hino
Referred to as "Purgatory" by fellow upperclassmen, Alvin is a fifth-year student and serves as the current student body president of Kimberly. His incredible firepower is the primary reason why he is able to keep his fellow upperclassmen in line and it is his great strength that allows him to slowly realize his dream of lessening the number of pointless loss of life Kimberly suffers through annually. He is close friends with Carlos and formerly with Ophelia.
He is the main protagonist of the prequel volume Side of Fire: Chronicle of Purgatory.
Vera Miligan (ヴェラ・ミリガン, Vera Mirigan)
Voiced by: Ai Kakuma
A female fourth year student that is a supporter of demi-human civil rights, in her own unusual way. Her hair covers her very unique left eye.
Cyrus Rivermoore (サイラス・リヴァーモア, Sairasu Rivāmoa)
Voiced by: Atsushi Imaruoka
Referred to as "Scavenger" by fellow upperclassmen, Cyrus is a fifth-year student and is Kimberly's foremost student necromancer. An old rival of Ophelia.

=== Faculty ===
Esmeralda (エスメラルダ, Esumeraruda)
Voiced by: Atsuko Tanaka (Japanese); Krystal LaPorte (English)
Feared as the "Witch of Kimberly", Esmeralda serves as the current Kimberly Headmistress. She led the conspiracy to murder Oliver's mother and dealt the killing blow herself.
Theodore McFarlane (セオドア・マクファーレーン, Seodor Makufārēn) / Lord McFarlane (マクファーレーンドノ, Makufārēn-dono)
The father of Michela, he is a part-time instructor at Kimberly. He normally spends most of his time traveling the world which is what enabled him to recruit Nanao as a Kimberly student.
Luther Garland (ルーサー・ガーランド, Rūsā Gārando)
Voiced by: Kazuyuki Okitsu (Japanese); John Burgmeier (English)
An alumnus of Kimberly, Luther is the current Sword Arts Instructor.
Darius Grenville (ダリウス・グレンヴィル, Dariusu Gurenviru)
Voiced by: Hiroki Tōchi (Japanese); Ian Sinclair (English)
The potions instructor at Kimberly Academy. There are rumors amongst the students that he may be stealing student's research papers and having them published under his name.

== Media ==
=== Light novels ===
The light novel series is written by Bokuto Uno and illustrated by Ruria Miyuki. ASCII Media Works published the first volume under their Dengeki Bunko imprint on September 7, 2018. As of August 2025, 15 serial volumes have been released, plus one prequel volume titled Side of Fire: Chronicle of Purgatory. The light novel series is licensed in North America by Yen Press.

==== Volumes ====
No.	Original release date	Original ISBN	English release date	English ISBN
1	September 7, 2018	978-4-04-893964-5	December 1, 2020	978-1-9753-1719-5
2	January 10, 2019	978-4-04-912261-9	May 4, 2021	978-1-9753-1720-1
3	May 10, 2019	978-4-04-912513-9	July 27, 2021	978-1-9753-1722-5
4	October 10, 2019	978-4-04-912789-8	December 7, 2021	978-1-9753-1724-9
5	February 7, 2020	978-4-04-913072-0	May 3, 2022	978-1-9753-3969-2
6	July 10, 2020	978-4-04-913255-7	September 6, 2022	978-1-9753-3971-5
7	June 10, 2021	978-4-04-913530-5	December 13, 2022	978-1-9753-4344-6
8	September 10, 2021	978-4-04-913934-1	May 23, 2023	978-1-9753-5225-7
9	March 10, 2022	978-4-04-914213-6	September 19, 2023	978-1-9753-6954-5
10	September 9, 2022	978-4-04-914531-1	January 23, 2024	978-1-9753-6956-9
11	March 10, 2023	978-4-04-914934-0	May 21, 2024	978-1-9753-7667-3
SoF	March 10, 2023	978-4-04-914935-7	October 29, 2024	978-1-9753-9392-2
12	July 7, 2023	978-4-04-915077-3	December 17, 2024	978-1-9753-9894-1
13	December 8, 2023	978-4-04-915276-0	June 10, 2025	979-8-8554-0739-6
14	February 7, 2025	978-4-04-915790-1	April 14, 2026	979-8-8554-2595-6
15	August 8, 2025	978-4-04-916464-0	October 13, 2026	979-8-8554-3555-9

=== Manga ===
A manga adaptation, illustrated by Sakae Esuno, was serialized in Kadokawa Shoten's Monthly Shōnen Ace magazine from May 25, 2019, to November 25, 2023, and compiled into eight tankōbon volumes. The manga series is also licensed in North America by Yen Press.

==== Volumes ====
No.	Original release date	Original ISBN	English release date	English ISBN
1	October 10, 2019	978-4-04-108775-6	November 16, 2021	978-1-9753-3663-9
2	April 25, 2020	978-4-04-109446-4	February 22, 2022	978-1-9753-3665-3
3	October 26, 2020	978-4-04-109447-1	May 31, 2022	978-1-9753-3667-7
4	May 26, 2021	978-4-04-111372-1	August 30, 2022	978-1-9753-4276-0
5	December 25, 2021	978-4-04-112028-6	February 21, 2023	978-1-9753-6008-5
6	September 26, 2022	978-4-04-112556-4	August 22, 2023	978-1-9753-7093-0
7	June 26, 2023	978-4-04-113826-7	July 23, 2024	978-1-9753-9247-5
8	February 26, 2024	978-4-04-114674-3	February 18, 2025	979-8-8554-1238-3

=== Anime ===
An anime television series adaptation was announced during the live-streamed "Dengeki Bunko Winter Festival 2021" event on December 11, 2021. It is produced by J.C.Staff and directed by Masato Matsune, with scripts supervised by Shōgo Yasukawa, character designs handled by Sōta Suwa, and music composed by Kujira Yumemi. The series aired from July 8 to October 14, 2023, on Tokyo MX and BS11. (Note: Tokyo MX listed the series premiere on July 7 at 24:30, which is effectively July 8 at 12:30 a.m. JST.) The opening theme song is "Kenka" (剣花; "Sword Flower") by Kujira Yumemi featuring Mimizuku and Fukurō, while the ending theme song is "Aimu" (アイム) by Kujira Yumemi featuring Shachi Tsumugi. Crunchyroll streamed the series.

The first six episodes adapt Volume 1 of the novel series, the following five adapt Volume 2, and the last four adapt Volume 3.

==== Episodes ====
No.	Title (Note: All English titles are taken from Crunchyroll.)	Directed by (Note: Information is taken from the ending credits of each episode.)	Written by	Storyboarded by	Original release date
1	"Ceremony"; Transliteration: "Seremonī" (Japanese: 入学式(セレモニー))	Shūji Miyazaki	Shōgo Yasukawa	Masato Matsune; Kōichi Takada	July 8, 2023
On the way to the opening ceremony at Kimberly Magic Academy, Oliver Horn passes by the mysterious samurai girl Nanao Hibiya, while becoming friends with fellow students Guy Greenwood and Katie Aalto. Outside the school, a student casts a spell that forces Katie to run towards a giant troll that has gone berserk, but she is saved by Nanao. At the ceremony, academy headmistress Esmeralda delivers a speech warning students that 20% of students do not survive to graduation, but are "consumed by the spell". The students attend a mixer afterwards where Oliver, Nanao, Guy, Katie, Michela McFarlane, and Pete Reston introduce each other and become friends. Nanao explains that she was saved from a certain death by one of Michaela's relatives and was recruited to enroll at Kimberly. At night, Oliver walks out of the dorm to investigate the school and meets up with Teresa Carste, who provides him with intel. At daybreak, Oliver meets a mysterious girl named Teresa Carste, sent by his siblings to watch over him. He then sees Nanao bathing her scar-covered body at the fountain nearby the boys dormitory, which Nanao claims is a purification ritual to cleanse herself for all the enemies she killed in war and is told that what she is doing is unacceptable.
2	"Sword Arts"; Transliteration: "Sōdo Ātsu" (Japanese: 魔法剣(ソードアーツ))	Makoto Sokuza	Shōgo Yasukawa	Kōichi Takada	July 15, 2023
The students begin their first day of classes at Kimberly starting with sword arts taught by Luther Garland. The arrogant student Richard Andrews challenges Nanao to a duel, but Oliver steps in to challenge her and scolds Richard for his inaction during the troll incident. Oliver and Nanao duel with an anti-lethality spell cast that prevents them from killing each other, but both manage to break the spell, causing Luther to stop the duel. Having felt fulfilled in battle, Nanao asks Oliver to duel her again, but Oliver is disinterested. The day continues with the students taking spellology taught by Frances Gilchrist, and then magical biology taught by Vanessa Aldiss. In magical biology, during an exercise to feed silkworms the right amount of magic, Katie overfeeds one of the silkworms; instead of burning it, she tries to save it and gets bitten before Oliver kills it. Katie explains that she wants to protect animals. At night, Oliver, Chela, and Pete venture into the spellology room to retrieve a book, only to become trapped when the labyrinth underneath Kimberly begins to encroach on the school building unexpectedly early. They encounter the upperclassman Ophelia Salvadori, who tries to seduce Oliver but fails. The three try to run away, but their path gets blocked by Cyrus Rivermore's bone fence.
3	"Soldier"; Transliteration: "Sorujā" (Japanese: 死兵(ソルジャー))	Shigeki Awai	Shinsuke Ōnishi	Hiroaki Yoshikawa	July 22, 2023
Rivermoore and Salvadori trade insults and provoke each other to battle. Oliver, Chela, and Pete attempt to flee in the confusion but are stopped again by Rivermoore. At that moment, Nanao arrives and vows to fight a holding action to ensure their escape at the cost of her own life. The brawl is abruptly halted by a fireball from Alvin Godfrey; he and Carlos Whitrow harshly scold the two rogue upperclassmen and escort the freshmen to the surface. Oliver is enraged at Nanao's disregard for her own life and demands an explanation. She describes her rescue by Theodore McFarlane and explains that the core tenet of style of kenjutsu she was taught is to "Enjoy not the sword of vengeance, but the sword of mutual love" – meaning to seek happiness in a duel to the death with an opponent one accepts and respects, which she found while sparring with Oliver earlier that day. The others advise her that if she can't tell the difference between the man and his sword, she should try to relate to the man, and Nanao apologizes for her foolishness and asks them to help her learn to live here. The next day's Sword Arts class brings a fresh confrontation with Andrews, leading to a formal duel challenge. Meanwhile, Katie clashes with Professor Grenville in an attempt to protect the troll who attacked her from being euthanized, and is rescued by Professor Garland and fourth-year Vera Miligan.
4	"Colosseum"; Transliteration: "Koroshiamu" (Japanese: 円形闘技場(コロシアム))	Kōzō Kaihō	Masato Matsune	Masato Matsune; Toshinori Fukushima	July 29, 2023
Katie and Miligan attempt to befriend the still-caged troll, for which Katie is targeted by anti-demihuman rights bullies which in turn starts a fight between them and Oliver, Guy, and Nanao. The group descends into the labyrinth under an escort of second-years to face their battle with Andrews in a colosseum on the first layer, but instead of a duel, the aristocrat reveals he's planned a canned hunt of kobolds. Nanao finds this insulting and makes to leave, only for a much stronger garuda to suddenly emerge from the monster room and begin attacking students – while the slogan "See how it feels to be the prey" appears on the ceiling. While Andrews flees for shelter, Nanao intercepts the garuda and Oliver moves to support her, but is injured and withdraws to heal himself with magic. After speaking again with Andrews, he returns to the battlefield and hatches a plan to bring the garuda down; with help from Andrews, who found the courage to return, they're able to bring the garuda down to earth and Nanao decapitates it.
5	"Glare"; Transliteration: "Gureā" (Japanese: 蛇眼(グレアー))	Daisuke Kurose	Shōgo Yasukawa	Daisuke Kurose	August 5, 2023
Katie succeeds in getting the troll to eat again. The group discusses the events of the preceding days and realize that the faculty likely won't be getting involved in the intramural conflict. After an alchemy exam during which Oliver impresses Professor Grenville by saving several students from injury, Andrews warns him of Grenville's reputation for plagiarizing promising students' work. He then introduces them to Annie Mackley, who admits to being the girl who cast the spell on Katie at the entrance ceremony but denies involvement with the troll or the garuda. Katie visits the troll again and asks him why he went wild; to her astonishment, the troll warns her to stop visiting, while Miligan looks on from the shadows. Simultaneously, an offhand comment from Nanao while practicing her spellcasting causes Oliver to realize that the troll was trying to escape. They rush to his cage to find Katie missing, and the troll tells them she was taken into the labyrinth. While searching for her, the two are transported into Miligan's workshop. Miligan has an unconscious Katie prepped for exploratory neurosurgery in hopes of determining how she was able to finish Miligan's experiments into granting human speech to trolls. Nanao attacks, and Miligan reveals her left eye is that of a basilisk.
6	"Arise"; Transliteration: "Araizu" (Japanese: 顕現(アライズ))	Kōzō Kaihō	Shinsuke Ōnishi	Toshihiko Masuda	August 12, 2023
Oliver and Nanao battle Miligan, with Nanao revealing she can parry incoming spells with her sword. With Oliver's help, she manages to get behind Miligan for a pincer attack, only for Miligan to reveal a second basilisk eye in the palm of her left hand. Nanao spontaneously invents a new "spellblade" – in the lore of the series, a sword arts technique that can neither be dodged nor blocked, guaranteeing the wielder's victory – and severs Miligan's hand at the wrist; she falls unconscious. Katie regains consciousness no worse for wear and decides all's well that ends well, reducing Oliver to tears of happiness. Professor Grenville takes Oliver deep into the labyrinth to investigate the laboratory of a student who was consumed by the spell. Oliver reveals he knows that Grenville was helping Miligan, and then that he's the son of Chloe Halford, a mage whom Grenville and six other members of the faculty tortured and murdered seven years ago. Oliver unveils his own spellblade, inherited from his mother, to defeat Grenville, and tortures him with the memories of the pain the conspirators inflicted on Halford until he begs for Oliver to finish him. After decapitating Grenville, Oliver is joined by his cousins and foster siblings Gwyn and Shannon Sherwood, Teresa Carste, and the cabal of mage students they've gathered to his cause, who swear allegiance to him until his mother is avenged.
7	"Reversi"; Transliteration: "Ribāshi" (Japanese: 両極往来者(リバーシ))	Makoto Sokuza	Shōgo Yasukawa	Kōichi Takada	August 19, 2023
Four months after the last episode, Pete has a strange nightmare and awakes to discover his body has become physically female. Headmistress Esmeralda demands to know if the other teachers have any information on Grenville's disappearance, but they come up empty. The group meets Chela's cousin Stacy Cornwallis and her attendant Fay Willock while traveling to a class on flying broomsticks, where Nanao pairs with a notoriously difficult broom once ridden by Oliver's mother. They meet Theodore McFarlane over lunch, and Chela chastises him for his silly behavior before he reveals that he'll be their substitute alchemy professor. Later, in a magical engineering class taught by Enrico Forghieri, Oliver must protect the ailing Pete from injury. He explains afterwards that Pete is a "reversi", able to switch his physical sex. They're then invited by Carlos Whitrow to a meeting of students with sex- and gender-linked magical traits, who welcome Pete with open arms.
8	"Rivals"; Transliteration: "Raibaruzu" (Japanese: 挑戦者(ライバルズ))	Kyōsuke Takada	Shinsuke Ōnishi	Toshinori Fukushima	August 26, 2023
While watching a broomsports team practicing, the group encounters Tullio Rossi, who later easily defeats Pete in Sword Arts. Pete asks the others to teach him to fight better, and Oliver and Chela agree to give him some pointers. At lunch, Rossi announces an all-first-years' dueling tournament to determine the strongest among them. Stacy and Fay join in, hoping for a crack at Chela. Nanao is challenged to a bout by Evelynn Odets and wins easily. Oliver is invited to tea by his cousins, and meets Ophelia on the way, who asks him to stay and chat with her for a bit. She leaves him with a cryptic warning not to go on too many adventures for the next few months. After dining with the Sherwood siblings and discussing his relationship with Nanao, Oliver is accosted in the labyrinth by Rossi, who reveals he's jealous of the amount of attention he gets. In their subsequent fight, Rossi reveals a self-taught fighting style and lands several punches on Oliver, before Oliver catches him in an armlock and disarms him. Oliver leaves him with advice to refine his fighting style by properly learning one of the three standard schools from scratch, and meets Teresa on his way to the dorm. Rossi is challenged again, this time by Joseph Albright.
9	"Explore"; Transliteration: "Ekusupuroa" (Japanese: 迷宮探索(エクスプロア))	Kōzō Kaihō	Shinsuke Ōnishi	Hiroaki Yoshikawa	September 2, 2023
Oliver helps Pete with the side effects of his reversi transformations, and recalls helping a woman with similar mana disruptions induced by pregnancy. The next morning, Pete comes out as a reversi to the others. Rossi announces he's withdrawing from his own tournament after losing a second fight. Pete duels Stacy in class and manages to surprise her a bit before Professor Garland calls time. The group is gifted a workshop in the labyrinth by Miligan, and after talking it over, agree to take a weekend trip to investigate it. Along the way, they meet Kevin Walker, a sixth-year who once became lost in the labyrinth, only to turn up alive six months later after being declared dead. They buy cooking ingredients from a shopkeeper Pamela Gorton and have a cookout in their new base. Chela suggests they come up with a name for their group, and Nanao declares them the "Sword Roses", after a warriors' custom from her homeland. Stacy and Fay learn that Chela is in the labyrinth and head in after her.
10	"Master and Knight"; Transliteration: "Masutā ando Naito" (Japanese: 主従(マスターアンドナイト))	Takaaki Ishiyama	Shōgo Yasukawa	Jirō Fujimoto	September 9, 2023
The Sword Roses awaken after camping out in their workshop overnight, and Katie arrives with Miligan and the talking troll, whom they've named Marco. Pete is disturbed by Miligan's new familiar: the hand Nanao severed in "Arise", which Miligan has reanimated and dubbed "Milihand". After their senior takes her leave, the Sword Roses set out on their second day of labyrinth exploration and encounter Stacy, Fay, and Joseph Albright, who challenge Oliver, Nanao, and Chela to a three-on-three team battle in a clearing on the labyrinth's second layer, the "Bustling Forest". Oliver, offended by Albright calling him a "nobody", changes things up by taking him on in Nanao's place. Cornered by Chela and Nanao, Stacy conjures an artificial moon with Fay's assent, forcing his werewolf transformation. As the two groups trade blows, Katie notices something is off about the ceiling.
11	"Duty"; Transliteration: "Dyūtī" (Japanese: 責務(デューティー))	Makoto Sokuza	Shōgo Yasukawa	Toshihiko Masuda	September 16, 2023
Oliver catches Albright in a grapple, gets him to make a mistake out of impatience, and blows him off his feet with a wind spell to win their single combat. Chela electrocutes Stacy and Fay with a lightning spell and disarms Stacy. The duo reveal that Stacy is in fact Chela's illegitimate half-sister, sired by Theodore McFarlane on a woman from a McFarlane branch family to ensure a backup heir should something happen to Chela, and was rejected by her stepfather as a consequence. Albright reveals that he cannot allow this loss to stand – the last time he lost, at chess to a serving girl, his parents tortured him for most of a day and murdered her entire family – and calls down a swarm of giant bees from the hive Katie noticed in "Master and Knight": the group must either let him erase their memories and claim he won, or die. The Sword Roses, Stacy, and Fay take shelter inside a barricade built by Guy using "toolplant" seeds he brought, and they enact a long-shot plan to destroy the bee swarm, during which Chela reveals she is a half-elf and therefore much better at spellcasting than she previously let on. Nanao then defeats Albright in single combat and they reconcile. After the end credits, a group of tentacled beasts appear and capture Albright, Fay, and Pete. The remaining freshmen flee to the surface, where Godfrey and Whitrow inform them that Ophelia Salvadori has been consumed by the spell.
12	"Possibility"; Transliteration: "Posshibiritī" (Japanese: 生還率(ポッシビリティー))	Daisuke Kurose	Shinsuke Ōnishi	Daisuke Kurose	September 23, 2023
The Kimberly student council, including Godfrey, Whitrow, Lesedi Ingwe, and Tim Linton, enter the labyrinth in search of Ophelia and the seventeen kidnapped freshmen. With no help forthcoming from the faculty, the Sword Roses plan to enter the labyrinth themselves, and Miligan agrees to bring Oliver, Nanao, and Chela with her to attempt to rescue Pete in exchange for Katie becoming her research assistant. Inside Ophelia's laboratory, Pete changes into female form while unconscious and becomes immune to her Perfume. Godfrey and Whitrow encounter Kevin Walker, who hands over a map he made of the third layer, where Ophelia's workshop lies. Miligan teaches the Sword Roses how to identify the weaknesses of Ophelia's chimeras and slay them.
13	"Noisy Forest"; Transliteration: "Noijī Foresuto" (Japanese: 賑わいの森(ノイジーフォレスト))	Kōzō Kaihō	Masato Matsune	Takashi Watanabe	September 30, 2023
In a flashback, a young Ophelia meets Whitrow for the first time and asks if they're the next "man" she's expected to breed with. In the present day, Whitrow tells Godfrey how they just wanted her to be able to have happiness in her life. The Sword Roses continue their journey through the Bustling Forest, with Teresa helping clear the way for her liege Oliver, and amidst a journey up and over the giant tree Irminsul they encounter a giant ape, whom Nanao persuades that they aren't a threat. They are attacked by a chimera shaped like a praying mantis, and Miligan allows the Sword Roses to handle it themselves. After several more battles take them to the far side of the second layer, they stop to rest for the night, and Miligan wonders aloud how a mage as seemingly ordinary as Oliver can keep up with the natural talents of Nanao and Chela. Meanwhile Stacy and her older half-sister Lynette are making their own way through the forest. Pete and Joseph Albright plot to escape using a set of magical orbs Albright had concealed in his abdomen.
14	"Salvadori"; Transliteration: "Saruvadōri" (Japanese: 淫魔の末裔(サルヴァドーリ))	Shūji Miyazaki	Shōgo Yasukawa	Shūji Miyazaki	October 7, 2023
The Sword Roses enter the third layer. They construct a boat out of Guy's toolplants to cross the swampy lake, and as a backup Miligan teaches them to magically walk on water. Stacy and Lynette begin their own crossing by broomstick, but Teresa cannot follow and must turn back. The Sword Roses are accosted by Cyrus Rivermoore, but are able to escape by tricking a chimera under the lake into attacking his bone serpent. Godfrey and Whitrow recall how they brought Ophelia as a freshman into the nascent Campus Watch – with Godfrey immunizing himself to her Perfume by repeatedly casting pain spells on his own genitals – but a year and a half of sexual harassment over her succubus ancestry took their toll on her sanity. She ultimately snapped, began seducing other Watch members, and fought with Tim Linton before being exiled to the labyrinth. Pete breaks out of Ophelia's brig, recovers his athame, and uses Albright's remaining orb to create a signal beacon marking Ophelia's lair.
15	"Last Song"; Transliteration: "Rasuto Songu" (Japanese: 聖歌(ラストソング))	Daisuke Kurose	Shōgo Yasukawa	Masato Matsune; Takashi Watanabe	October 14, 2023
Pete's beacon allows the various rescue parties to converge on Ophelia's hideout. The Sword Roses and Cornwallises arrive first, greeting a tearful Pete before being confronted by Ophelia herself, who begins her endgame: the casting of a Grand Aria, a high-level ritual that creates a pocket universe of the caster's design. Entrapped within a world in the form of Ophelia's womb that will infinitely birth chimeras, the Sword Roses attack her to end the spell but are swiftly overcome. But Ophelia hesitates, reminded of her own loneliness amidst their companionship. At that moment, Whitrow and Godfrey arrive, and Whitrow uses their enchanted voice to break into her Grand Aria from outside, calming and embracing the dying Ophelia before they both vanish into light. The rescue parties and kidnap victims return to the surface and reunite with Katie, Guy, and Marco the troll, and Oliver wonders in his internal monologue about their possible futures as the Sword Roses pass by Professors Aldiss, Forghieri, Gilchrist, and Headmistress Esmeralda – before being jolted out of his thoughts by a hungry Nanao.

== Reception ==
The light novel series ranked first in 2020 in Takarajimasha's annual light novel guide book Kono Light Novel ga Sugoi!, in the bunkobon category.

== See also ==
- Alderamin on the Sky — Another light novel series by the same author.
- The Greatest Magicmaster's Retirement Plan — Another light novel series by the same illustrator.
- The Villainess Speaks Not — Another light novel series by the same illustrator.
