= Yuki Yomichi =

- 夜道 雪
- Born: November 21, 1999 (age 26); Sapporo, Japan
- Occupations: YouTuber, voice actress, tarento
- Agent: Quatre Stella
- Known for: Super Cub as Koguma
- Musical career
- Genres: J-Pop
- Instrument: Vocals
- Years active: 2022–present
- Label: Universal Music Japan
- Website: www.universal-music.co.jp/yomichiyuki/

Yuki Yomichi (夜道 雪, Yomichi Yuki; born November 21, 1999) is a Japanese voice actress, YouTuber, tarento and singer from Sapporo who is affiliated with Quatre Stella. She is known for her role as Koguma, the protagonist of the anime television series Super Cub.

== Biography ==
Yomichi was born in Sapporo on November 21, 1999. When she was in her third year of junior high school, she was scouted by a talent agency and began entertainment activities. In 2020, she began serving as an ambassador for Sony's Xperia line of phones.

In 2021, she was cast in her first main voice acting role as Koguma, the protagonist of the anime television series Super Cub. She has also been cast as Serene Hozumi in the anime series Mother of the Goddess' Dormitory.

She made her singer debut on May 10, 2022, with her mini-album debut "Hatsuki First Love" (初雪First Love, lit. First Snow First Love) on July 20, 2022.

== Filmography ==
=== Anime ===
- Sono Toki, Kanojo wa. (2018), Chiaki
- Super Cub (2021), Koguma
- Mother of the Goddess' Dormitory (2021), Serene Hozumi
- Ippon Again! (2023), Sachi Minato
- Rokudo's Bad Girls (2023), Azami Himeno
- Necromancer Isekai: How I Went from Abandoned Villager to the Emperor's Favorite (2027), Ishtar

=== Video games ===
- Samurai Maiden (2022), Tsumugi Tamaori
