= Smile of the Arsnotoria =

Japanese mobile game and its franchise

咲う アルスノトリア (Warau Arusunotoria)
- Created by: Nitroplus
- Video game
- Developer: NextNinja
- Publisher: Good Smile Company
- Music by: Hideyuki Ashizawa
- Genre: Role-playing game
- Platform: iOS, Android
- Released: March 4, 2021
- Manga

Warau Arsnotoria Sun—!
- Written by: Masaki Hattori
- Published by: Fujimi Shobo
- Magazine: Monthly Dragon Age
- Original run: June 9, 2022 – May 9, 2023
- Volumes: 2
- Anime television series

Smile of the Arsnotoria the Animation
- Directed by: Naoyuki Tatsuwa
- Produced by: Hajime Maruyama; Tetsurou Satomi; Daisuke Masaki; Nobuhiko Kurosu; Toshihiro Suzuki
- Written by: Midori Gotō
- Music by: Ryo Takahashi; Ken Itō
- Studio: Liden Films
- Licensed by: Crunchyroll
- Original network: Tokyo MX, BS NTV
- Original run: July 6, 2022 – September 21, 2022
- Episodes: 12
- Novel

Warau Arsnotoria Sun—! Kotō no Extra Curriculum
- Written by: Takaaki Kaima
- Illustrated by: Hinako Hino; Liden Films
- Published by: Enterbrain
- Imprint: Famitsu Bunko
- Published: July 29, 2022
- icon

Smile of the Arsnotoria (Japanese: 咲う アルスノトリア, Hepburn: Warau Arusunotoria) is a Japanese mobile game created by Nitroplus. Developed by NextNinja and published by Good Smile Company, the game was released on iOS and Android in March 2021. A manga adaptation by Masaki Hattori was serialized in Fujimi Shobo's shōnen manga magazine Monthly Dragon Age from June 2022 to May 2023, with its chapters collected into two tankōbon volumes. An anime television series adaptation produced by Liden Films aired from July to September 2022.

== Premise ==
The story revolves around some students who are in an ashram, where the students will interact with each other while all of them are being taught about magic and culture.

== Characters ==
Arsnotoria (アルスノトリア, Arusunotoria)
Voiced by: Misaki Kuno (Japanese); Jad Saxton (English)
Mell (メル, Meru)
Voiced by: Miharu Hanai (Japanese); Dani Chambers (English)
Little Alberta (小アルベール, Shō Arubēru)
Voiced by: Miyu Tomita (Japanese); Megan Shipman (English)
Picatrix (ピカトリクス, Pikatorikusu)
Voiced by: Eri Yukimura (Japanese); Bryn Apprill (English)
Abramelin (アブラメリン, Aburamerin)
Voiced by: Eriko Matsui (Japanese); Brianna Roberts (English)
Lidel (リデル, Rideru)
Voiced by: Minori Chihara
Solō (ソロー, Sorō)
Voiced by: Yukana
Hammit (ハミット, Hamitto)
Voiced by: Marina Inoue
Perdera (ペルデラ, Perudera)
Voiced by: Asuna Tomari
Voyniy (ヴォイニー, Voinī)
Voiced by: Yumiri Hanamori (Japanese); Sarah Wiedenheft (English)
Spirits (精霊, Seirei)
Voiced by: Risae Matsuda, Satsumi Matsuda
Figuray (フィグレ, Figure)
Voiced by: Reina Ueda

== Media ==
=== Game ===
The mobile game was unveiled by Nitroplus in September 2019. NextNinja handled the game's development and operation, with Good Smile Company serving as the publisher. Light novel illustrator Shin'ichirō Ōtsuka provided the main character designs, Hajime Ninomae wrote the scenario based on an original story by Nitroplus, and Hideyuki Ashizawa composed the music. The game was originally set for a Q2 2020 release on iOS and Android, before being shifted to February 2021, and then to March 4, 2021. The game ended service on March 31, 2023.

=== Manga ===
A manga adaptation by Masaki Hattori, titled Warau Arsnotoria Sun—! (咲う アルスノトリア すんっ！), was serialized in Fujimi Shobo's Monthly Dragon Age magazine from June 9, 2022, to May 9, 2023. Two tankōbon volumes were released on September 9, 2022, and July 7, 2023.

=== Anime ===
In May 2022, it was announced that the game will be adapted as an anime television series, titled Smile of the Arsnotoria the Animation. It is produced by Liden Films and directed by Naoyuki Tatsuwa, with Midori Gotō handling the scripts, Takahiro Kishida adapting Ōtsuka's character designs for animation, and Ryo Takahashi and Ken Itō composing the music. The series aired from July 6 to September 21, 2022, on Tokyo MX and BS NTV. The opening theme song is "Hajimari e to Tsuzuku Basho" (はじまりへと続く場所) by Hanauta, a group composed of Misaki Kuno, Miharu Hanai, Miyu Tomita, Eri Yukimura and Eriko Matsui, while the ending theme song is "With You" by Band-Maid guitarist/vocalist Miku Kobato and her Cluppo solo project. Crunchyroll streamed the series with Japanese audio and English subtitles, and also premiered an English dub starting on July 27, 2022.

==== Episodes ====
No.	Title	Directed by	Written by	Storyboarded by	Original release date
1	"Sniff, Sniff, Sniff"; Transliteration: "Sun Sun Sūn" (Japanese: すんすんす—ん)	Yasutoshi Iwasaki	Midori Gotō	Naoyuki Tatsuwa	July 6, 2022
2	"Hug!!!"; Transliteration: "Gyā!!!" (Japanese: ぎゃ———————! ! !)	Susumu Yamamoto	Midori Gotō	Hiroyuki Hata	July 13, 2022
3	"Sniff..."; Transliteration: "Sūn......" (Japanese: す—ん......)	Michiru Itabisashi	Midori Gotō	Masayoshi Nishida	July 20, 2022
4	"Ding Dong"; Transliteration: "Rīn Gōn" (Japanese: リ———ンゴ——ン)	Shunji Yoshida	Midori Gotō	Yasunori Ide	July 27, 2022
5	"Sn-..."; Transliteration: "Sū......" (Japanese: す—......)	Nozomu Kamiya	Midori Gotō	Takashi Kawabata	August 3, 2022
6	"Shh-"; Transliteration: "Shī" (Japanese: し—)	Kazuya Fujishiro	Midori Gotō	Yoshiaki Iwasaki	August 10, 2022
7	"Coo coo coo" Transliteration: "Nō Nō Nō" (Japanese: ノ～ノ～ノ～)	Shunji Yoshida	Midori Gotō	Katsumi Terahigashi	August 17, 2022
8	"Wa------"; Transliteration: "Wā" (Japanese: わ—————)	Daishi Katō	Midori Gotō	Tomoyuki Munehiro	August 24, 2022
9	"Uh~ Uh~ Uo~~"; Transliteration: "Ū Ū Wō" (Japanese: う～う～うぉ～～)	Kazuya Fujishiro	Midori Gotō	Ryūhei Aoyagi	August 31, 2022
10	"SSSS-----"; Transliteration: "Susususū" (Japanese: すすすす————)	Sakura Akise	Midori Gotō	Yasushi Muroya	September 7, 2022
11	"On three" Transliteration: "Sēno" (Japanese: せーの)	Shunji Yoshida	Midori Gotō	Takashi Kawabata	September 14, 2022
12	"Sniff!"; Transliteration: "Sun!" (Japanese: すんっ！)	Daishi Katō	Midori Gotō	Ryūhei Aoyagi	September 21, 2022

=== Novel ===
A spin-off novel written by Takaaki Kaima and illustrated by Hinako Hino and Liden Films, titled Warau Arsnotoria Sun—! Kotō no Extra Curriculum (咲う アルスノトリア すんっ！ 孤島の魔法鉱物学実習(エクストラカリキュラム)), was published by Enterbrain under their Famitsu Bunko imprint on July 29, 2022. It is focused on the anime-original character Lidel.
