= Chiyuki Miura =

Japanese voice actress

- 三浦 千幸
- Born: November 17, 1995 (age 30); Miyagi Prefecture, Japan
- Occupation: Voice actress
- Years active: 2017–present
- Employer: Ken Production
- Notable work: Ippon Again! as Towa Hiura; Blue Archive as Nonomi Izayoi; Pluto as Wassily

Chiyuki Miura (三浦 千幸, Miura Chiyuki; born November 17, 1995) is a Japanese voice actress from Miyagi Prefecture, affiliated with Ken Production. After being part of the 2nd Seiyū Artist Ikusei Program Selection in 2016, she began her career in voice acting and has since starred as Towa Hiura in Ippon Again! and Nonomi Izayoi in Blue Archive.

== Biography ==
Chiyuki Miura, a native of Miyagi Prefecture, was born on 17 November. While she attended school, she played badminton and was a swimmer.

In 2016, Miura and Yūko Natsuyoshi were part of the 2nd Seiyū Artist Ikusei Program Selection. She was educated at the voice actor training school School Duo, graduating in April 2018. In addition to minor characters in Karakuri Circus, Chihayafuru, How Heavy Are the Dumbbells You Lift?, Redo of Healer, and Shaman King, she voiced Faye Yeager in Attack on Titan, a young Arata Shindo in Psycho-Pass 3, Nagi Tamura in Assault Lily Bouquet, and Hana Shimura in My Hero Academia.

In November 2021, Miura was cast as Allister, a character in the December 2021 premiere episodes of Pokémon Ultimate Journeys: The Series. In 2022, she starred as Towa Hiura, a main character in Ippon Again!. She also stars as Nonomi Izayoi in Blue Archive, reprising her role in the 2024 anime adaptation.

Miura speaks the Tōhoku dialect. She also plays video games and watches game commentaries as a hobby.

== Filmography ==
=== Television animation ===
Year	Title	Role	Ref.
2017	Dream Festival! R		
2018	Karakuri Circus	Beth, Prague town girl	
2018	Puzzle & Dragons	Haruka	
2019	Attack on Titan	Faye Yeager	
2019	Chihayafuru 3	Schoolgirl, spectator	
2019	How Heavy Are the Dumbbells You Lift?	Female student	
2019	Psycho-Pass 3	Arata Shindo (young)	
2020	Assault Lily Bouquet	Nagi Tamura	
2020	Majime ni Fumajime Kaiketsu Zorori		
2020	My Hero Academia	Hana Shimura, girl	
2020	Noblesse	Takio's younger sister	
2021	Pokémon Ultimate Journeys: The Series	Allister	
2021	Redo of Healer	Clerk	
2021	Shaman King	Classmate	
2021	Shinkansen Henkei Robo Shinkalion	Child	
2021	The Great Jahy Will Not Be Defeated!	High school girl B	
2021	The World's Finest Assassin Gets Reincarnated in Another World as an Aristocrat	Ifa	
2022	Ippon Again!	Towa Hiura	
2022	Pop Team Epic	John (young), Rabbit	
2023	Beyblade X	Fan	
2023	Jujutsu Kaisen	Student	
2023	The Tale of the Outcasts	Woman	
2024	Blue Archive The Animation	Nonomi Izayoi	
2026	Shiboyugi: Playing Death Games to Put Food on the Table	Yuuki	
2027	Bless	Jun Sumisaki	

=== Animated film ===
Year	Title	Role	Ref.
2019	My Hero Academia: Heroes Rising	Child	
2020	Psycho-Pass 3: First Inspector	Arata Shindo (young)	
2021	Belle	Mermaid, girl	
2022	Bubble	Hibiki (young)	
2026	Shiboyugi: Playing Death Games to Put Food on the Table – 44: Cloudy Beach	Yuuki	

=== Original net animation ===
Year	Title	Role	Ref.
2019	SD Gundam World Sangoku Soketsuden	Citizen	
2021	Gunpla-kun	Gunpla-kun	
2021	Pokapoka Magmagg House	Anna	
2021	Pokémon Evolutions	N (young)	
2023	Pluto	Wassily	

=== Video games ===
Year	Title	Role	Ref.
2019	Dragon Quest XI	Honey, Araune	
2019	Princess Connect! Re:Dive	Kakaoura	
2020	Last Period	Crystal	
2021	Blue Archive	Nonomi Izayoi	
2024	The Legend of Zelda: Echoes of Wisdom	Princess Zelda	
2024	Arknights	Rope	
2026	Azur Lane	IJN Takahashi	
20266	Stella Sora	Leafia	
