= Carli Mosier =

American voice actress and political activist

- Born: Carlin Cyd Mosier; February 28, 1978 (age 48); Houston, Texas, U.S.
- Education: University of Houston
- Occupations: Voice actress; activist
- Years active: 2005–present
- Notable work: Astraea in Heaven's Lost Property; Nanase Tsukumo in Love, Chunibyo & Other Delusions; Mineru Wachi in Mother of the Goddess' Dormitory
- Political party: Democratic
- Board member of: ROADWomen
- Spouse: Dustin Faigen

Carliyn Cyd Mosier (born February 28, 1978) is an American voice actress and political activist. She is also a board member for the River Oaks Area Democratic Women (ROADWomen).

Mosier has provided voices for a number of English-language versions of Japanese anime series.

== Early life ==
Mosier was born on February 28, 1978, in Houston, Texas. She is the daughter of Bruce Debs Mosier (1936–2017) and Diane Mosier (1948–2018) who were members of the Democratic Party and is one of four children in the family. Mosier at a young age attended Kinder High School for the Performing and Visual Arts and the University of Houston.

== Voice acting ==
Mosier voiced characters on many anime shows starting with Mythical Detective Loki Ragnarok which was her voice acting debut in 2005 along with Godannar. She voiced Yukika in Nerima Daikon Brothers, Neptunite in Land of the Lustrous, and Yuri Kurosu in Magikano. She also voices Wilhelmina in Shakugan no Shana, Astraea in Heaven's Lost Property, Akira Yoshii in Baka and Test, Rin Tohsaka in Fate/kaleid liner Prisma Illya, Yuko Amamiya in Ef: A Fairy Tale of the Two, Toko Fukawa in Danganronpa: The Animation, and Ikkaku in One Piece.

== Personal life ==
She is married to Dustin Faigen and resides in Houston, TX. As she is involved in voice acting, Mosier has used this platform to engage fans in political discussions and organizing with a convention panel called "Anime and Activism".

== Selected filmography ==
=== Anime ===
List of voice performances in anime
Year	Title	Role	Source
2003-2005	Mermaid Melody Pichi Pichi Pitch	Rina Toin	
2005	Mythical Detective Loki Ragnarok	Tsubasa Maijima, Neighborhood Woman A, Girl B, Additional Voices	
2005	Godannar	Kei, Rosa	
2006	Crayon Shin-chan	Musae Koyama/Bitzi Koyama (Funimation dub)	
2006	Nerima Daikon Brothers	Yukika (Inspector Widget), Additional Voices	
2007	Venus Versus Virus	Nene Mikumo	
2007	Blade of the Phantom Master	Yo	
2007	Magikano	Yuri Kurosu	
2007	Xenosaga: The Animation	Febronia, Councilwoman, Additional Voices	
2007	Moeyo Ken	Sayoko Yamazaki	
2010	Halo Legends	Daisy-023, Girl	
2011	Guin Saga	Ema, Li Fa	
2012	Another	Sanae Mizuno	
2013	Battle Girls: Time Paradox	Uesugi Kenshin	
2013	Unbreakable Machine-Doll	Cedric	
2013	Phi Brain: Puzzle of God	Tamaki Chieno	
2013	Mysterious Girlfriend X	Yoko Tsubaki	
2013	Campione!	Ena Seishuin	
2013	Kokoro Connect	Maiko Fujishima	
2013	Little Busters!	Yuiko Kurugaya	
2013	Girls und Panzer	Akebi Sasaki	
2013	Say I Love You.	Aiko Muto	
2013	Pokémon the Series: Black & White	Shannon, Zweilous, Hydreigon	
2014	Maria Holic	Nanami Kiri	
2014	From the New World	Mizuho Watanabe	
2014	Hakkenden: Eight Dogs of the East	Kokonoe	
2014	Gatchaman Crowds	Utsu-tsu	
2014	Problem Children Are Coming from Another World, Aren't They?	Leticia Draculair	
2014	Watamote	Nurse	
2014	Rozen Maiden Zurücksplen	Kirakishou	
2014	Fate/kaleid liner Prisma Illya	Rin Tosaka	
2014	Sunday Without God	Mu	
2014	The Ambition of Oda Nobuna	Shibata Katsuie	
2015	Danganronpa: The Animation	Toko Fukawa / Genocider Sho	
2015	Dog & Scissors	Sachi Moribe	
2015	Love, Chunibyo & Other Delusions	Nanase Tsukumo	
2015	Hamatora	Momoka	
2015	Magical Warfare	Violet North	
2015	Nobunaga the Fool	Niccolo Machiavelli	
2015	Leviathan: The Last Defense	Mushussu	
2015	Beyond the Boundary	Izumi Nase	
2015	Black Bullet	Seitenshi	
2015	Riddle Story of Devil	Haruki Sagae	
2016	Hanayamata	Machi Tokiwa	
2016	Wizard Barristers	Mayu	
2016	Gatchaman Crowds Insight	Utsu-tsu	
2016	Cross Ange	Hilda	
2016	Trinity Seven	Levi Kazama	
2016	My Love Story!!	Ai Sunakawa	
2017	ACCA: 13-Territory Inspection Dept.	Eider	
2017	New Game!	Shizuku Hazuki, Mozoku	
2017	Chihayafuru	Chitose	
2017	Myriad Colors Phantom World	Arisu Himeno	
2017	Fairy Tail	Ophiuchus (Eclipse)	
2018	Haikyu!! (season 2)	Saeko Tanaka	
2018	Flip Flappers	Yuyu	
2018	Devils' Line	Juliana Lloyd	
2018	Doreiku	Fujiko Taitou	
2018	Sword Oratoria	Revis	
2018	Anonymous Noise	Eiji Mikota (young), Nino's Mother	
2018	Armed Girl's Machiavellism	Amou	
2018	Hitorijime My Hero	Ayaka	
2019	Land of the Lustrous	Neptunite	
2019	Hakumei and Mikochi	Jada	
2019	Kämpfer	President	
2019	Ahiru no Sora	Yoko	
2020	Senryu Girl	Tao Hanakai	
2020	Shirobako	Chiemi Dōmoto	
2021	Mother of the Goddess' Dormitory	Mineru Wachi	
2023	Farming Life in Another World	Leeta	
2023	Phantom of the Idol	Yayoi	

=== Film ===
List of voice performances in direct-to-video and television films
Year	Title	Role	Notes	Source
2012	Gintama: The Movie	Matako Kijima, Ayame Sarutobi		
2013	Colorful	Makoto's Mother		
2015	Aura: Koga Maryuin's Last War	Yumina Oshima		
2016	Bodacious Space Pirates: Abyss of Hyperspace	Misa Grandwood		
2016	Girls und Panzer der Film	Akebi Sasaki, Nagura		
2021	Gintama: The Very Final	Ayame Sarutobi		
