= Eri Yukimura =

Japanese voice actress

- 幸村 恵理
- Born: December 6, 1998 (age 27); Saitama Prefecture, Japan
- Occupation: Voice actress
- Years active: 2018–present
- Agent: VIMS
- Notable work: The Magnificent Kotobuki as Emma; The Idolmaster Shiny Colors as Fuyuko Mayuzumi; In the Land of Leadale as Cayna

Eri Yukimura (幸村 恵理, Yukimura Eri; born December 6, 1998) is a Japanese voice actress from Saitama Prefecture who is affiliated with VIMS. She started her career in 2018 after passing an audition, and in 2019 she played her first main role as Emma in the anime television series The Magnificent Kotobuki. She also played Cayna, the protagonist of the anime series In the Land of Leadale in 2022.

== Biography ==
Yukimura was born in Saitama Prefecture on December 6, 1998. She had an interest in voice acting from an early age, partly inspired by conversations she had with her older sisters. When she was in elementary school she would try writing down the names of voice actors from anime and video games that they talked about.

Yukimura applied for the Japan Narration Actor Institute during her third year of junior high school, and started taking classes there after entering high school. She chose to take classes there as classes were only once a week and would thus not interfere with her studies. She noted that she was the youngest in her class and felt nervous as there was even a trainee who was fifteen years older than her. As her training progressed, she had doubts on whether to continue pursuing a career in voice acting. She decided to continue pursuing voice acting partly as a result of the death of her grandmother, who had been opposed to her becoming a voice actress; Yukimura noted that she wanted to prove her grandmother that her decision to continue this path was right. After passing an audition, she became affiliated with the talent agency VIMS.

The year after starting her career, Yukimura was cast in her first main role as Emma in the anime television series The Magnificent Kotobuki. She was also cast as Fuyuko Mayuzumi in the mobile game The Idolmaster Shiny Colors. In 2020 she was cast as the character Kotoko Imai in the franchise Mewkledreamy. In 2021 she played the roles of Mikoto Fujishima in WIXOSS Diva(A)Live and Raine in the second season of That Time I Got Reincarnated as a Slime. In 2022, she was cast as Cayna in In the Land of Leadale and Anri Teieri in Blue Lock.

== Filmography ==
=== Anime series ===
Year	Title	Role	Notes	Ref.
2018	A Certain Magical Index III	Tsushima		
2019	The Magnificent Kotobuki	Emma		
2020	Mewkledreamy	Kotoko Imai		
2021	WIXOSS Diva(A)Live	Mikoto Fujishima		
2021	That Time I Got Reincarnated as a Slime	Raine		
2022	In the Land of Leadale	Cayna		
2022	In the Heart of Kunoichi Tsubaki	Hototogisu		
2022	Smile of the Arsnotoria the Animation	Picatrix		
2022	Blue Lock	Anri Teieri		
2023	Classroom for Heroes	Claire		
2024	Mysterious Disappearances	Oto Adashino		
2024	Cardfight!! Vanguard: Divinez	Hikari Myodo, Erika Myojo		
2026	Spirit Circle	Rune		
2027	The Greatest Magicmaster's Retirement Plan	Tesfia Fable		

=== Video games ===
Year	Title	Role	Notes	Ref.
2018	The Idolmaster Shiny Colors	Fuyuko Mayuzumi		
2019	Dead or Alive Xtreme Venus Vacation	Monica		
2020	Magia Record	Ranka Chizu		
2020	Azur Lane	Vauquelin, Tartu, Monica		
2020	Pokémon Masters EX	Gloria		
2021	Smile of the Arsnotoria	Picatrix		
2022	DNF Duel	Dragon Knight		
