= Mother of the Goddess' Dormitory =

Japanese manga series and its adaptation

- Cover of the first manga volume

女神寮の寮母くん。 (Megami-ryō no Ryōbo-kun)
- Genre: Comedy, harem
- Manga
- Written by: Ikumi Hino
- Published by: Kadokawa Shoten
- Magazine: Monthly Shōnen Ace
- Original run: December 26, 2017 – June 24, 2022
- Volumes: 9
- Anime television series
- Directed by: Shunsuke Nakashige
- Produced by: Noritomo Isogai; Mitsuhiro Ogata; Atsushi Itou
- Written by: Masashi Suzuki
- Music by: Tomoki Kikuya
- Studio: Asread
- Licensed by: Sentai Filmworks: SA/SEA: Muse Communication
- Original network: AT-X, Tokyo MX, KBS Kyoto, SUN, BS11
- Original run: July 14, 2021 – September 15, 2021
- Episodes: 10
- icon

Mother of the Goddess' Dormitory (Japanese: 女神寮の寮母くん。, Hepburn: Megami-ryō no Ryōbo-kun; lit. "Dorm Mother of the Goddess' Dorm") is a Japanese manga series by Ikumi Hino. It was serialized in Kadokawa Shoten's shōnen manga magazine Monthly Shōnen Ace from December 2017 to June 2022, and was collected in nine tankōbon volumes as of August 2022. An anime television series adaptation by Asread aired from July to September 2021.

== Plot ==
Koshi Nagumo, a first year middle school student, finds himself homeless, penniless, and without relatives to care for him after a house fire. As he lies on the street, he gets picked up to become the "dorm mother" of a dormitory full of troubled women's university students.

== Characters ==
Koshi Nagumo (南雲孝士, Nagumo Kōshi)
Voiced by: Misuzu Yamada (Japanese); Brittney Karbowski (English)
A junior high school student who gets a job at the dormitory after his house burned down and he is abandoned by his family.
Atena Saotome (早乙女あてな, Saotome Atena)
Voiced by: Ayaka Nanase (Japanese); Christina Kelly (English)
A resident of the dormitory with androphobia that causes her to have excessive nosebleeds. She is the first to come to view herself as Koshi's older sister while Koshi seemingly develops a crush on her. The ending of the series implies that she ends up with Koshi.
Mineru Wachi (和知みねる, Wachi Mineru)
Voiced by: Chiaki Takahashi (Japanese); Carli Mosier (English)
A resident of the dormitory. She has a lab in her room within which she often creates dangerous chemicals and aphrodisiacs.
Kiriya Senshō (戦咲きりや, Senshō Kiriya)
Voiced by: Risako Murai (Japanese); Katelyn Barr (English)
A resident of the dormitory. She is the heiress to a dojo and enjoys cross-dressing and shoujo manga as well as martial arts.
Frey (フレイ, Furei)
Voiced by: Asaki Fukuyama (Japanese); Melody Spade (English)
A resident of the dorm. She creates and models costumes. She often dresses up Koshi in outfits, including women's clothing, much to his embarrassment.
Serene Hozumi (八月朔日せれね, Hozumi Serene)
Voiced by: Yuki Yomichi (Japanese); Natalie Rial (English)
A resident of the dormitory. She claims she is actually an alien, and derives her powers from the Moon.
Sutea Koroya (香炉野すてあ, Kōroya Sutea)
Voiced by: Hikaru Nanjō (Japanese); Juliet Simmons (English)
Koshi's childhood friend with a tsundere personality and an aversion to being touched due to her body's abnormal reaction to heat, something Koshi often counteracts through the use of ice-packs.
Uzume Shigaraki (神楽 うずめ, Shigaraki Uzume)
A university student who is a frequent visitor to the dormitory.
Takiri Nagino (凪野 たきり, Nagino Takiri)
A university student and Uzume's best friend. She is nicknamed "Nagi-chan" and has a gyaru personality.

== Media ==
=== Manga ===
Written and illustrated by Ikumi Hino, Mother of the Goddess' Dormitory was serialized in Kadokawa Shoten's shōnen manga magazine Monthly Shōnen Ace from December 26, 2017, to June 24, 2022. The series was collected in nine tankōbon volumes as of August 26, 2022.

==== Volumes ====
No.	Japanese release date	Japanese ISBN
1	June 25, 2018	978-4-04-107050-5
2	December 25, 2018	978-4-04-107727-6
3	April 26, 2019	978-4-04-108137-2
4	October 26, 2019	978-4-04-108698-8
5	May 26, 2020	978-4-04-109450-1
6	January 26, 2021	978-4-04-109451-8
7	June 25, 2021	978-4-04-111483-4
8	December 25, 2021	978-4-04-111827-6
9	August 26, 2022	978-4-04-112634-9

=== Anime ===
An anime adaptation was announced in the fifth volume of the manga on May 25, 2020. It was later revealed to be a television series animated by Asread and directed by Shunsuke Nakashige, with Masashi Suzuki handling the series' scripts, and Maiko Okada designing the characters. Tomoki Kikuya is composing the series' music. The series aired from July 14 to September 15, 2021, on AT-X and other channels. The five-member unit Megami Ryōsei performed the opening theme song "Naughty Love", while Megami Ryōsei+α performed the ending theme song "Zettai! Kimi Sengen." Muse Communication licensed the series in South and Southeast Asia. The series is licensed in territories outside of Asia by Sentai Filmworks, and the English dub of the series debuted on the Hidive platform on August 25, 2021.

==== Episodes ====
No.	Title	Directed by	Written by	Storyboarded by	Original release date
1	"Koushi Becomes a Dorm Mother"; Transliteration: "Kōshi, Ryōbo ni Naru" (Japanese: 孝士、寮母になる)	Shunsuke Nakashige	Masashi Suzuki	Shunsuke Nakashige	July 14, 2021
1	"The Problem with Mineru and Frey"; Transliteration: "Mineru to Furei, Wakeari" (Japanese: みねるとフレイ、ワケあり)	Shunsuke Nakashige	Masashi Suzuki	Shunsuke Nakashige	July 14, 2021
First year middle school student Koushi Nagumo is made homeless by a fire and his father abandoning him. Koushi is taken in by Mineru Wachi who feeds him and lets him use the bath. Koushi realizes the bathroom contains three naked girls and flees, knocking over a fourth and ending with his face in her panties. Mineru explains she is manager of the Goddess dormitory of Seikan Women’s University. The girls are Kiriya Sensho, Serene Hosumi, and Frey, plus the girl whose panties he encountered, Atena Saotome. Mineru offers Koushi a job as Dormitory Mother. Atena, who fears men, refuses to accept Koushi and moves out. Not wanting Atena to lose her home, Koushi leaves instead. Finding him sleeping on a bench and realizing her selfishness, Atena brings Koushi back, but passes out after he accidentally gropes her. Koushi begins cleaning but discovers the dorm is known locally as “Problem Dorm” due to the girls odd behaviours; Mineru performs scientific experiments and often produces toxic substances, and Frey is a cosplayer who dresses people in costume, often against their will, plus all the girls seem to enjoy being partially clothed or entirely naked. Koushi scolds them; impressing Mineru he is taking responsibility already.
2	"The Problem with Kiriya and Serene"; Transliteration: "Kiriya to Serene, Wakeari" (Japanese: きりやとせれね、ワケあり)	Hiroaki Matsushima	Rie Koshika	Shunsuke Nakashige	July 21, 2021
2	"Atena Awakens"; Transliteration: "Atena, Mezameru" (Japanese: あてな、目覚める)	Hiroaki Matsushima	Rie Koshika	Shunsuke Nakashige	July 21, 2021
Kirya breaks the floor and falls into Koushi’s room, having gotten excited reading shōjo manga. She asks to share Koushi’s room as he resembles her brothers, but when she tries wrestling him he flees to her room. Kirya is left flustered. Serene makes Koushi a bizarre offer to fix the floor if he becomes her servant. Half asleep Koushi agrees and Serene kisses him. The next morning the floor is fixed and Koushi worries over a strange dream he had. Atena is concerned Koushi and the girls are friends so quickly. While shopping with him Koushi praises the progress she has made with men since they met, which she appreciates, then realises Koushi made the other girls feel the same way and flees, only for Koushi to save her by pretending she is his sister when she bumps into two men. Atena surprisingly finds the idea of being his sister intensely appealing and insists he call her “big sis”. The moment is ruined when her skirt falls down, accidentally showing her panties; she panics and falls with her butt in his face. Regardless she understands why the others already trust him and decides to help by protecting him from the immoral behaviour of the others, though this leads to the others wanting to be his sisters too.
3	"Koushi, At a Loss"; Transliteration: "Kōshi, Omoinayamu" (Japanese: 孝士、思い悩む)	Kiyoshi Murayama	Rie Koshika	Atsushi Ōtsuki	July 28, 2021
3	"Koushi Goes Back to School"; Transliteration: "Kōshi, Fukugaku Suru" (Japanese: 孝士、復学する)	Kiyoshi Murayama	Rie Koshika	Atsushi Ōtsuki	July 28, 2021
The girls compete to see who the best big sister is. Frey dresses Koushi as a girl, Mineru tries to test her latest formula on him, Serene is too hungry to compete, Kirya uses erotic wrestling moves on him and Atena can’t be near him without getting a nosebleed. Koushi decides this is exactly what having sisters is like. Mineru and Frey announce they have enrolled Koushi in middle school. On his first day at school Koushi is punished by Sutea Koroya, his friend he hasn’t seen since his house burned down. Sutea pretends to be mad at him but privately was worried. Sutea, who has heat intolerance, remembers Koushi became her friend because he would make his fingers cold with ice before holding hands. After listening to his story about Goddess dorm she insists on meeting the girls but Koushi accidentally falls on her. She is tempted to let something lewd happen but overheats and punishes him instead. Koushi hopes to show Sutea the dorm is perfectly normal, but when they arrive, they encounter Frey, who is cosplaying as a sexy bunny girl and Mineru, who's only dressed in her lab coat and panties as her room was in the middle of yet another chemical explosion.
4	"A Childhood Friend Visits the Dorm"; Transliteration: "Osananajimi, Ryō ni Kuru" (Japanese: 幼馴染み、寮に来る)	Kazuya Fujishiro	Rie Koshika	Naoyuki Kuzuya	August 4, 2021
4	"Koushi Goes Undercover at a Women's College"; Transliteration: "Kōshi, Joshidai ni Sennyū Suru" (Japanese: 孝士、女子大に潜入する)	Kazuya Fujishiro	Rie Koshika	Naoyuki Kuzuya	August 4, 2021
Sutea decides to judge whether the dorm is suitable. The girls realise Sutea has a crush on Koushi. Sutea is infuriated by what Koushi considers the girls normal lewd and dangerous behaviour but is convinced to spend the night in Atena’s room. Sutea demands to know what Atena’s relationship to Koushi is but before Atena can answer Koushi ends up in a nude situation with Kirya in the bathroom. A furious Sutea demands to know if they see Koushi only as a brother or a man, and when they can’t answer Sutea leaves upset. Atena and Kirya begin avoiding Koushi. When they forget their lunches Frey forces Koushi to deliver their lunches to them. Since men are banned from the women’s campus Frey forces Koushi to cross-dress as a girl. When he is exposed anyway Atena saves him. Koushi notices Atena doesn’t get a nosebleed while he is cross-dressing. They find Kirya but are forced to change when they accidentally get wet. Atena borrows one of Kirya’s shirts but due to her larger breasts the shirt rips, exposing her breasts to Koushi and finally giving her a nosebleed. Returning home Atena announces they all need a vacation together and Sutea is invited too.
5	"Serene the Shut-in"; Transliteration: "Serene, Hikikomoru" (Japanese: せれね、ひきこもる)	Norihiko Nagahama	Rie Koshika	Naoki Ōhira	August 11, 2021
5	"The Goddess Dormitory Goes on Vacation"; Transliteration: "Megami-ryō, Ryokō e Iku" (Japanese: 女神寮、旅行へ行く)	Norihiko Nagahama	Rie Koshika	Naoki Ōhira	August 11, 2021
Serene is uneasy at vacationing away from the moon, the source of her power. Everyone decides to create a portable safe zone filled with moon items. Frey provides a costume from a moon themed anime which is rejected. Mineru provides moon themed aphrodisiac but accidentally uses it on Frey. Kirya tries to teach Serene moon theme Tai-chi but Serene becomes too tired. Atena provides an umbrella with a moon symbol and Koushi finishes washing Serene’s jacket which she calls her moon robe, curing her uneasiness. Serene visits Koushi and kisses him in his sleep. At the hotel Atena admits she organised the vacation to apologise to Sutea. Mineru tries to peek on Koushi in his bath, resulting in Atena being exposed naked and giving Koushi a nosebleed. Everyone sleeps in Koushi’s room, in various stages of nudity, except for Atena who sneaks out. Mineru and Koushi follow her to the haunted section of the hotel. Mineru almost has a moment with Koushi and wonders if it was caused by lust or fear of ghosts. Atena almost kisses Koushi, despite still wanting to be his big sister, but they are caught by Mineru and Serene. The next morning Frey insists they finally go to the beach.
6	"Sutea Ponders About the Sea"; Transliteration: "Sutea, Umi ni Omou" (Japanese: すてあ、海に思う)	Kazuya Fujishiro	Rie Koshika	Naoyuki Kuzuya	August 18, 2021
6	"Koushi Makes His Cosplay Debut"; Transliteration: "Kōshi, Kosupure Debyū Suru" (Japanese: 孝士、コスプレデビューする)	Kazuya Fujishiro	Rie Koshika	Naoyuki Kuzuya	August 18, 2021
At the beach Koushi remains confused about Atena. A fish gets stuck in Sutea’s swimsuit, causing her to struggle to swim. Koushi rushes to save her but remembering he can’t swim sends Kirya instead. Sutea is glad Koushi was worried about her. Koushi sees Atena being harassed by men so he pulls her away, revealing Atena no longer gets nosebleeds around Koushi as he makes her feel safe. Sutea apologises to Kirya and Atena, admitting she was jealous they helped Koushi after losing his home while she couldn’t and is convinced Atena has only sisterly feelings for Koushi. Koushi begins acting strangely. Frey decides cosplay will get him to talk and drags him to her favourite cosplay studio. Frey dresses herself and Koushi as characters from an anime. Tricking Koushi into answering honestly Frey learns most of what occurred during the vacation and his confusion about his current relationships with the girls clashing with his changing emotions. Koushi realizes he wants to protect Atena, but is unsure if he wants to do it as dorm mother, a brother or as a man, but either way he intends to do it with more confidence from now on. He also learns from Frey that she will stop running from her past and someday try to reveal her true blunt self to the Goddess Dormitory.
7	"The School Festival at Seikan Women's University"; Transliteration: "Seikan Joshidai, Gakuensai" (Japanese: 星間女子大、学園祭)	Hiroaki Matsushima	Masashi Suzuki	Manabu Ono	August 25, 2021
Koushi and Sutea attend a festival at the girls’ college where Mineru sells aphrodisiacs. Koushi and Sutea are saved from Mineru’s lusty female victims by Serene using a highly advanced moon laser. Serene claims this drained her energy and requires a kiss to recharge. She almost kisses Koushi but he thinks of Atena and stops. Atena volunteers as a maid but struggles serving men and falls with her breasts in Koushi’s face. Sutea discovers she likes maid outfits. A cross-dressing contest is announced with Kirya as a judge cross-dressed as a boy. Koushi has a drink but realises it was another aphrodisiac that will reveal his true self. Kirya gives them three tickets to a maze and Koushi becomes uncharacteristically excited. In the maze Atena and Kirya realise Koushi is acting his age instead of his overly mature self. Koushi trips in the dark and gropes both Atena and Kirya, returning him to normal. Mineru later reveals Koushi only drank water, meaning everything he did was his own free will. Sutea has great success as a sadist maid. The Occult Research Society attempt to capture Serene to study her moon powers but are stopped by another aphrodisiac that causes them to chase after the cross-dressed Kirya and cause chaos for the entire festival.
8	"Kiriya Wishes Upon a Christmas"; Transliteration: "Kiriya, Kurisumasu ni Negau" (Japanese: きりや、クリスマスに願う)	Fumihiro Ueno	Rie Koshika	Atsushi Ōtsuki	September 1, 2021
Kirya is asked to run her family dojo Christmas party. Atena and Koushi volunteer to help. While cleaning the showers Koushi sees Atena naked, who falls on top of him and gets a nosebleed. Now anaemic Atena is unable to help so Koushi and Kirya go shopping. Kirya thinks maybe she and Koushi are on a date but comments from passers-by makes her think Koushi only likes Atena. Kirya decides to be Santa so they ask Frey for help. Frey goes overboard taking Kirya’s measurements so Koushi flees before he can see anything inappropriate. Serene is bribed with food to replace Atena. The dojo’s younger students insist Koushi and Serene help practise karate but Koushi is forced to step in when Serene’s outfit falls open. One of the students thinks she doesn’t deserve a present because she never plays with the others so Koushi helps her make friends. Kirya and Serene reveal the outfits Frey made and Kirya realises hers make her panties visible. As he is the reindeer Serene rides on Koushi’s back, causing him to realise she isn’t wearing anything under her skirt. Koushi gives Kirya a present so she almost kisses him, until Serene interrupts.
9	"Sutea Reflects on the Kotatsu"; Transliteration: "Sutea, Kotatsu ni Omou" (Japanese: すてあ、コタツに想う)	Masayuki Iimura	Rie Koshika	Naoyuki Kuzuya	September 8, 2021
9	"Koushi Tackles Spring Cleaning"; Transliteration: "Kōshi, Ōsōji ni Idomu" (Japanese: 孝士、大掃除に挑む)	Masayuki Iimura	Rie Koshika	Naoyuki Kuzuya	September 8, 2021
Mineru buys a kotatsu. The girls all tease Koushi under the table but also reminisce about using kotatsu with their families. Koushi asks if he and Sutea can use it while doing homework, disappointing Atena. Sutea is hesitant but agrees as long as she doesn’t overheat. Atena goes shopping for knitting supplies. Koushi falls asleep under the kotatsu with his foot in Sutea’s panties, causing some accidental stimulation which is witnessed by Atena, causing Sutea to punish Koushi and banning him from the kotatsu indefinitely. Koushi begins spring-cleaning. Serene’s door sticks so she falls from her window and lands with her butt in Koushi’s face. Koushi finds outfits in Frey’s room she forced him to cosplay in and is almost punished by Sutea when he also finds underwear. Atena bribes their way into Serene’s room with food, finding the door was jammed because her mountains of possessions collapsed when she tried to find new year’s gifts she bought everyone for being her friends. Mineru gets drunk on her gift, a bottle of super strength sake, along with Atena and Serene so all three pass out on top of Koushi. Atena drunkenly reveals she is jealous of Sutea but falls asleep before explaining why. Sutea finds them in a pile together and furiously punishes Koushi.
10	"The Goddesses of the Goddess Dormitory"; Transliteration: "Megami-ryō no Megami-tachi" (Japanese: 女神寮の女神たち)	Shunsuke Nakashige	Masashi Suzuki	Shunsuke Nakashige	September 15, 2021
New Year is approaching so Koushi plans a large meal for everyone. Noticing Koshi is having a tough time enduring the cold weather, Atena begins knitting gloves as a present for Koushi. Koushi goes grocery shopping with Kirya to prepare a special meal for the holiday, but suddenly collapses with a fever to everyone's horror. Sutea visits in a panic but overheats when checking his temperature and passes out. The girls attempts to nurse Koushi back to health goes horribly from Frey posing as a sexy nurse to Kirya embarrassingly ruining his clothes. Koushi has a nightmare about his home burning down and decides to relieve his unease with a bath only to be caught by Frey and Serene who attempt to cure his fever by lewdly massaging him with medicinal oils. Koushi flees naked and bumps into Kirya who hurriedly dresses him in tattered clothes, though they make it harder for Koushi to endure the cold. Atena attempt to make rice gruel but Frey adds her own ingredients which explode, leaving her and Atena naked, raising Koushi’s fever again and making him pass out. Realising Koushi is dangerously sick, Atena decides to nurse him properly through the night. While he is asleep, Atena confesses she is glad he is their dorm mother before falling asleep beside him without getting a nosebleed. Koushi eventually recovers and is able to go shopping with everyone for ingredients for New Year’s dinner while wearing the gloves Atena made for him.
