= The Villainess Speaks Not =

Japanese light novel series by Kei Yose and Ruria Miyuki

- Cover of the first light novel volume

悪役令嬢はしゃべりません (Akuyaku Reijō wa Shaberimasen)
- Genre: Fantasy, isekai, political
- Novel series
- Written by: Kei Yose
- Published by: Shōsetsuka ni Narō (self-published)
- Original run: 21 June 2020 – present
- Light novel
- Written by: Kei Yose
- Illustrated by: Ruria Miyuki
- Published by: Overlap
- English publisher: NA: J-Novel Club
- Imprint: Overlap Bunko
- Original run: 25 April 2024 – present
- Volumes: 6
- Manga
- Written by: Kei Yose
- Illustrated by: Ryū Miduki
- Published by: Overlap
- Magazine: Comic Gardo
- Original run: 12 August 2026 – present

The Villainess Speaks Not: The Awoken Genius and the Once-Lost Pawn (Japanese: 悪役令嬢はしゃべりません, Hepburn: Akuyaku Reijō wa Shaberimasen; "The Villainess Doesn't Speak") is a Japanese light novel series written by Kei Yose and illustrated by Ruria Miyuki. Originally published as a web novel on Shōsetsuka ni Narō since June 2020, it later began publication by Overlap under its Overlap Bunko imprint in April 2024. A manga adaptation illustrated by Ryū Miduki began serialization online on Overlap's Comic Gardo website in August 2026.

== Plot ==
After recovering from a fever, Liliana Alexandra Clarke remembers that she is a villainess character in an otome game, reincarnated from a past life in Japan. She also discovers that she is now mute, impairing her ability to use magic or defend herself, an issue since she is betrothed to a crown prince. Despite these shortcomings, she discovers that she can perform non-verbal magic.

== Media ==
=== Light novel ===
The Villainess Speaks Not was first published by Kei Yose as a web novel on Shōsetsuka ni Narō on 21 June 2020. It was later released as a light novel series illustrated by Ruria Miyuki; its first volume was released by Overlap under its Overlap Bunko imprint on 25 April 2024.

In October 2025, J-Novel Club announced that it has licensed the light novel series for English publication. The official English edition was translated by Adam and edited by Kieran Redgewell.

No.	Original release date	Original ISBN	English release date	English ISBN
1	25 April 2024	978-4-8240-0789-6	18 March 2026	978-1-7183-9586-2
2	25 August 2024	978-4-8240-0912-8	12 August 2026	978-1-7183-9588-6
3	25 January 2025	978-4-8240-1019-3	—	—
4	25 June 2025	978-4-8240-1215-9	—	—
5	25 October 2025	978-4-8240-1371-2	—	—
6	20 August 2026	978-4-8240-1730-7	—	—

=== Manga ===
A manga adaptation illustrated by Ryū Miduki began serialization online on Overlap's Comic Gardo website on 12 August 2026.

== Reception ==
Erica Friedman of Anime News Network gave The Villainess Speaks Not a 4 out of 5, calling it "a respectably well-written light novel, populated with respectably well-developed characters, respectably well-imagined plotlines, and a solid premise". Sean Gaffney from A Case Suitable for Treatment praised the light novel, remarking despite its length: "I felt rewarded, though. Thrilling stuff".

Friedman praised Liliana as "a solid lead character," as well as the worldbuilding and character development of allies and antagonists, but deemed the idea of making Liliana (reincarnated from being an adult) and many other characters young children as out of place for the story. Gaffney described Liliana's allies as "fun", singling out Petra, Gildo, and Olga, and found their presence encouraging despite her problematic situation.

Friedman criticized the way the work's political and personal drama "just wore on me". Gaffney stated that politics are meant to be a narrative priority over romance, noting that J-Novel Club placed it in their main imprint instead of the romance-themed J-Novel Heart. Gaffney also added that it was "a rare villainess book that has almost no humor at all," but found the premise a bit mundane, noting "You can’t be too surprised, given the title and the genre".

== See also ==
- The Greatest Magicmaster's Retirement Plan, another light novel series with the same illustrator
- Reign of the Seven Spellblades, another light novel series with the same illustrator
