= The Greatest Magicmaster's Retirement Plan =

Japanese light novel series

- First light novel volume cover

最強魔法師の隠遁計画 (Saikyō Mahōshi no Inton Keikaku)
- Genre: Fantasy, harem
- Novel series
- Written by: Izushiro
- Published by: Shōsetsuka ni Narō
- Original run: April 29, 2015 – present
- Light novel
- Written by: Izushiro
- Illustrated by: Ruria Miyuki
- Published by: Hobby Japan
- English publisher: NA: J-Novel Club
- Imprint: HJ Bunko
- Original run: February 28, 2017 – present
- Volumes: 20
- Manga
- Written by: Izushiro
- Illustrated by: Yū Uonuma
- Published by: Hobby Japan
- Imprint: HJ Comics
- Magazine: Comic Fire
- Original run: July 28, 2017 – January 11, 2019
- Volumes: 2
- Manga

The Greatest Magicmaster's Retirement Plan: The Alternative
- Written by: Izushiro
- Illustrated by: Karu Yoneshiro
- Published by: Square Enix
- Imprint: Gangan Comics UP!
- Magazine: Manga Up!
- Original run: August 9, 2020 – November 26, 2023
- Volumes: 10
- Anime television series
- Directed by: Yūsuke Suzuki
- Written by: Gigaemon Ichikawa
- Studio: Hotline
- Original network: JNN (CBC, TBS)
- Original run: 2027 – scheduled
- icon

The Greatest Magicmaster's Retirement Plan (Japanese: 最強魔法師の隠遁計画, Hepburn: Saikyō Mahōshi no Inton Keikaku) is a Japanese light novel series written by Izushiro and illustrated by Ruria Miyuki. The story centers around 16-year-old Alus Reigin, a young prodigy and the world's strongest Magicmaster in a battle against the invading fiends, while attempting to reclaim humanity's lost territory and to protect mankind from near extinction in fantasy-esque earth. Initially, Izushiro started his work on the user-generated novel publishing website Shōsetsuka ni Narō back in 2015. Hobby Japan eventually acquired Izushiro's work and began publishing the print edition as a light novel in February 2017. J-Novel Club licensed the light novel series for English releases in March 2019. A manga adaptation by Yū Uonuma was serialized online on Hobby Japan's Comic Fire manga website from July 2017 to January 2019 before it got canceled. A second manga adaptation by Karu Yoneshiro titled The Greatest Magicmaster's Retirement Plan: The Alternative (最強魔法師の隠遁計画－ジ・オルターネイティブ－, Saikyō Mahōshi no Inton Keikaku: Ji Orutāneitibu) was serialized online on Square Enix's Manga Up! website from August 2020 to November 2023. An anime television series adaptation produced by Hotline is set to premiere in 2027.

== Plot ==
100 years ago, out of nowhere, humanity faced a new enemy and was gradually driven out of its land. This enemy was an abomination called "Fiends", and they wielded devastating power in which conventional weaponry was useless. 100 years later, humanity is yet to reclaim their lost lands, and remnants of human civilizations are splintered into seven countries but are united against the fiends. A massive magical barrier was erected by Babel in the center of the seven nations, thwarting the fiends' invasion and saving humanity from extinction.

Magicmasters, numbering in the hundreds of thousands, are what stand between humanity and its extinction, protecting their countries against the Fiends. Magicmasters distinguish themselves through a numerical ranking system. The lower their digits, the stronger the Magicmaster is. Alus Reigin, protagonist and Magicmaster from the nation of Alpha, has been battling the fiends since the age of six. He has reclaimed more of humanity's lost territory than anyone else alive. One day at the age of 16, he requests retirement from military services. Naturally, the governor-general can not accept his resignation, and so they reach a compromise. With that, he ends up as a student at Second Magical Institute, forced to hide his identity, but some of the select few knew who this boy truly is.

He finds himself a partner, Loki Leevahl, to aid in his mission. He also ends up training his successors, Tesfia Fable and Alice Tilake. He even comes across the daughter of his former superior, Felinella Socalent. On top of his growing list of responsibilities and frequent messes in dealing with these beauties, he resumes his research and continues to defeat the Fiends in secret.

== Characters ==
=== Main characters ===
Alus Reigin
Voiced by: Yūto Uemura
A 16-year-old boy and the strongest Magicmaster, serving the nation of Alpha. He started serving in the military at the age of six before he rose through the ranks. His affinity is Void meaning his magic is attribute-less, and he wields a custom and self-made AWR (Assist Weapon Recovery, i.e., Aura) "Night Mist", which comes in the form of a short-sword with chains imbued with magic.^{LN 1.2} Alus was born with two different manas, which created his attribute-less disposition and unique abilities.^{LN 2.9} He is yet to fully comprehend the mysteries surrounding his nature, which is why he devoted himself to magical research on top of his Magicmaster duties.
He is a good researcher, performing self-research on magic at an early age to gain a better understanding of his abilities. However, being raised as an effective killing machine from an early age, Alus lacks tact and understanding when it comes to the subtleties of the heart.^{LN 1.1} Despite his icy-cold exterior, his personality is subtly changing, such as being able to read the mood of an event as he spends more time with the girls at the institute.
Alus is currently a student at the Second Magical Institute.^{LN 1.1} He works on his magic researches in his free time and sometimes responds to mission requests that comes directly from Governor-General Berwick Sarebian. He reports directly to the governor-general.
Loki Leevahl
Voiced by: Yui Ogura
Alus's partner, Loki, is a triple-digit Magicmaster and a double-digit Spotter. Spotters specialize in detecting Fiends, and only double-digit Magicmasters or higher are assigned spotters as their partners. Apart from being an expert at Fiends detection, she also is an excellent Magicmaster with combat experience. Like Alus, she was an orphan after losing her parents to the Fiends, and her hatred towards the enemy spurred her decision to join the military at a very young age. She uses a knife AWR and her affinity is the lightning attribute.^{LN 1.3}
She had first met Alus at one of the Military training facilities, albeit briefly. This short encounter left a significant impression on her to push forward and continue with the harsh training. Eventually, she would reencounter Alus when he saved her life on her first mission, which went awry back when she was a child. Since then, she decided that she would devote her entire life to Alus by being useful. When she learned of Alus's enrollment at the Institute, she immediately followed suit and eventually became his partner after undergoing a trial imposed by Alus.^{LN 1.3}
She is exceptionally loyal to Alus and tends to get jealous of the other girls when they get too close to him. She is adept at housework such as cleaning up the laboratory, indexing research paper works and even prepares meals for Alus.^{LN 2.8}
Initially, she does not get along with Tesfia and Alice. She is enraged with how Tesfia and Alice treat Alus, despite them being aware of Alus's status and predicament. She eventually warms up and becomes more accepting of the two girls, when she realizes Tesfia and Alice are working hard not just for their own sake, but for others as well. She has feelings for Alus and competes for his affection.^{LN 1.3}
Tesfia Fable
Voiced by: Eri Yukimura
Tesfia is a first-year student and top novice Magicmaster of her year at the Institute, currently being trained by Alus. She is from one of the noble families from Alpha. Her affinity is ice magic, and she uses a katana AWR that she inherited from her family.^{LN 1.2} Tesfia has a blunt and hot-headed personality, but deep down is gentle, diligent, and hardworking.
When she first meets Alus, they both started on bad terms and she initially looks down on him. After she loses to Alus in a mock battle and discovers Alus's true identity, her opinion of him takes a turn for the better.^{LN 1.3} She is gradually drawn to him.^{LN 2.8}
Alice Tilake
A first-year student, she is also one of the top novice Magicmasters of her year at the Institute. Currently being trained by Alus, Alice is cheerful and maternal with a dark past. As a child, she participated in one of Godma's unethical experiments on augmented humans that was sanctioned by the government. Due to an unfortunate event, she lost her parents and became an orphan. She became close to another test subject named Melissa.^{LN 2.8}
Alice is a very close and dear friend of Tesfia. Her affinity is light magic, and due to defects in her mana information as an unintended result of the experiment, she is also capable of wielding attribute-less magic to a certain degree, albeit inferior to Alus.^{LN 2.9} She is extremely grateful that she met Tesfia, Loki, Felinella and Alus as they brought light to her darkened world. Like the other girls, she has feelings for Alus though she is the most timid of them all.^{LN 2.9}
Felinella Socalent
A triple-digit Magicmaster, Felinella is a talented second-year student in the Institute as well as the girls' dormitory supervisor, meaning she is senior to Tesfia and Alice. She is the daughter of Lord Vizaist Socalent, one of the prominent noble families in Alpha, and she is very popular throughout the noble society of the seven nations.^{LN 3.14} She would occasionally assist her father in missions under his supervision as auxiliary personnel.
She has romantic feelings for Alus, trying to propose to Alus through her father. After the subjugation mission against Godma, she realizes winning Alus' heart through her father's influence would only lead to a one-sided love. Thus, she resolves to woo Alus herself.^{LN 3.14}

=== Nation of Alpha ===
Berwick Sarebian
Governor-general of Alpha's Military and Alus's current direct superior, he is aware of Alus' secrets and circumstances. Berwick is the one responsible behind Alus's current living arrangement with the Institute.^{LN 1.Prologue}
Sisty "Witch" Nexophia
Sisty Nexophia is the principal of Second Magic Institute and a former single-digit Magicmaster. "Witch" is her moniker. At her peak, she was ranked 9th but eventually retired from active duty due to certain circumstances,^{LN 1.2} namely, an unspoken rule among the seven nations: each nation should only have one single-digit Magicmaster to maintain political balance. Since Alpha had two single-digit Magicmasters in the form of Sisty and Alus, Sisty opted for retirement since she was older than Alus.^{LN 3.11} She became the principal shortly after retiring from active duty.
Vizaist Socalent
Vizaist was previously Alus Reigin's superior in the temporary special forces. Head of one of the most distinguished Noble families in Alpha, he holds the title of Lord with the rank of captain. He is currently the head of the Elite Intelligence department.^{LN 3.10} Lord Vizaist is also the father to Felinella Socalent, whom he loves to dote on. He thinks highly of her daughter's potential and Alus, even offering his daughter's hand in marriage to Alus.^{LN 3.14}

=== Others ===
Godma Barhong
A mad scientist with no regard to ethics and human life, he is the source of all the dreadful things in Alice and Melissa's life. He began a human augmentation experiment years ago, but the government eventually blacklisted his research. He has been on the run from the military and conducted his experiment under the radar.
While on the run, he secretly receives funding, research equipment, and materials from a powerful yet unknown individual, with an alias "Enouve", to continue his illegal research.^{LN 3.8}
Melissa
Alice's old childhood friend whom she befriended while she was part of Godma's cruel experiment.^{LN 2.A}

== Media ==
=== Light novels ===
Hobby Japan first published the print edition as a light novel in February 2017. For the English localization, J-Novel Club acquired the rights for English releases in March 2019, with the first English-translated volume being published in May 2019.

No.	Original release date	Original ISBN	English release date	English ISBN
1	March 1, 2017	978-4-7986-1396-3	May 14, 2019 (digital)	978-1-718344-00-6
Prologue; 1st Chapter: New World; 2nd Chapter: The Difference Between the Ideal and Reality; 3rd Chapter: A Silver-Colored Chance Meeting; 4th Chapter: The Ball at Night
2	May 1, 2017	978-4-7986-1446-5	August 13, 2019 (digital)	978-1-7183-4402-0
5th Chapter: The Storm Begins; 6th Chapter: Outer World; 7th Chapter: Converging Turbulence; 8th Chapter: Broken Memories; 9th Chapter: Fomenting Darkness
3	August 1, 2017	978-4-7986-1505-9	November 12, 2019 (digital)	978-1-7183-4404-4
10th Chapter: A Strange Attack; 11th Chapter: Garden of Madness; 12th Chapter: Visit From the Past; 13th Chapter: Appalling; 14th Chapter: Sorrowful Arrival; 15th Chapter: The End of the Horrible Dream
4	December 1, 2017	978-4-7986-1565-3	February 18, 2020 (digital)	978-1-7183-4406-8
16th Chapter: Yearning; 17th Chapter: The Aristocrats' Tea Party; 18th Chapter: Pride and Discord; 19th Chapter: Secret Feud; 20th Chapter: Industrial City Folen; 21st Chapter: Rulers Conference
5	February 1, 2018	978-4-7986-1621-6	May 5, 2020 (digital)	978-1-7183-4408-2
22nd Chapter: Selection Matches; 23rd Chapter: Live Combat Training; 24th Chapter: Anguish of the Matchless; 25th Chapter: The Seven Nations Friendship Magical Tournament; 26th Chapter: Bath, Maidens, and Chatting; 27th Chapter: The Puppet's Orchesis; 28th Chapter: Magical Martial Arts Demonstration
6	May 1, 2018	978-4-7986-1690-2	September 1, 2020 (digital)	978-1-7183-4410-5
29th Chapter: Emissary; 30th Chapter: Exposed Truth; 31st Chapter: Unsettling Departure; 32nd Chapter: Bonds and Battle; 33rd Chapter: The Depth of Darkness from Blind Faith; 34th Chapter: Acquired Honor; 35th Chapter: Chaos in the Outer World; 36th Chapter: The Two Encounters
7	September 1, 2018	978-4-7986-1762-6	November 23, 2020 (digital)	978-1-7183-4412-9
37th Chapter: An Ominous Silence; 38th Chapter: Dazzling Battlefield; 39th Chapter: What Stirs in the Depths; 40th Chapter: Rebellious Unwanted — Demi Azur; 41st Chapter: Bystander Lurking in Twilight; 42nd Chapter: The Density of Silence
8	February 1, 2019	978-4-7986-1863-0	February 23, 2021 (digital)	978-1-7183-4414-3
43rd Chapter: Awkward Good News; 44th Chapter: Campus Festival; 45th Chapter: A Bizarre Candidate; 46th Chapter: Tens of Thousands of Hostages; 47th Chapter: The Young Girl in the World of Dreams
9	August 1, 2019	978-4-7986-1943-9	May 12, 2021 (digital)	978-1-7183-4416-7
48th Chapter: Presence of a Noble Collar; 49th Chapter: Iridescent Collar; 50th Chapter: Innocent Incarnation; 51st Chapter: Wake Up at Night
10	February 1, 2020	978-4-7986-2059-6	August 12, 2021 (digital)	978-1-7183-4418-1
52nd Chapter: A Morning of Afterglow and Doubt; 53rd Chapter: The Transformation of Vanalis; 54th Chapter: Humanely, At Least; 55th Chapter: The Shadow of the Snow-Laden Sky; 56th Chapter: Mad Fanatic; 57th Chapter: Magic and Magic; 58th Chapter: That Reaching Hand; 59th Chapter: The Smell of the Past
11	August 1, 2020	978-4-7986-2262-0	October 28, 2021 (digital)	978-1-7183-4420-4
60th Chapter: Remembering the White Wolf; 61st Chapter: A Silent Congratulations; 62nd Chapter: Cloudy with a Chance of Rain; 63rd Chapter: One of the Three Great Noble Families; 64th Chapter: A Circumstantial Ally
12	February 1, 2021	978-4-7986-2414-3	February 10, 2022 (digital)	978-1-7183-4422-8
65th Chapter: In the Wedge of Sin; 66th Chapter: Where the Will Is; 67th Chapter: Coiling Wiles; 68th Chapter: Seizing the Shadow in the Turmoil; 69th Chapter: Midnight Blood Feast; 70th Chapter: The Brand of a Defect
13	July 31, 2021	978-4-7986-2554-6	June 2, 2022 (digital)	978-1-71834-424-2
71st Chapter: Flight of the Dead; 72nd Chapter: Scarred Soul; 73rd Chapter: Those Who Lurk in the Shadows; 74th Chapter: A Free Pawn; 75th Chapter: The Absolute of Clevideet; 76th Chapter: Promise
14	December 28, 2021	978-4-7986-2701-4	August 18, 2022 (digital)	978-1-71834-426-6
77th Chapter: A Contradictory Person from the Sturdy Nation; 78th Chapter: Plus One; 79th Chapter: Invisible Resident; 80th Chapter: Cold War Negotiations; 81st Chapter: Atrocious Beasts; 82nd Chapter: March of the Mad King; 83rd Chapter: Unwelcome Pick-up and Drop-off
15	June 1, 2022	978-4-7986-2843-1	February 2, 2023 (digital)	978-1-7183-4428-0
84th Chapter: A Chance Encounter between the Shrewd; 85th Chapter: The Ill Omen Comes; 86th Chapter: Fragile Peace; 87th Chapter: Less than Human
16	December 28, 2022	978-4-7986-3018-2	June 29, 2023 (digital)	978-1-7183-4430-3
88th Chapter: The Fierce Search-and-Destroy Operation; 89th Chapter: Professor and Puppeteer; 90th Chapter: Divine Wisdom and Grimoire; 91st Chapter: The Mysteries of Magic; 92nd Chapter: The World of Vessels; 93rd Chapter: He Who Reaps Souls
17	September 1, 2023	978-4-7986-3238-4	May 3, 2024 (digital)	978-1-7183-4432-7
94th Chapter: Mental Scars; 95th Chapter: The Family's Long-Cherished Desire; 96th Chapter: A Cold Spark; 97th Chapter: Scion of Darkness; 98th Chapter: Secret Talk and Honeymoon
18	May 1, 2024	978-4-7986-3535-4	December 19, 2024 (digital)	978-1-7183-4434-1
99th Chapter: A Small Bud; 100th Chapter: The Tenbram Begins; 101st Chapter: A Witch Among Witches; 102nd Chapter: The Pure Queen of Ice; 103rd Chapter: The Merits of Insanity; 104th Chapter: Beyond Change
19	April 1, 2025	978-4-7986-3817-1	May 21, 2026 (digital)	978-1-7183-4436-5
20	December 27, 2025	978-4-7986-3977-2	December 17, 2026 (digital)	978-1-7183-4438-9
21	December 1, 2026	978-4-7986-4349-6	—	—

=== Manga ===
A manga adaptation illustrated by Yū Uonuma was serialized on Hobby Japan's Comic Fire website from July 28, 2017, to January 11, 2019, with its chapters collected into two volumes under the HJ Comics imprint. A second adaptation, titled The Greatest Magicmaster's Retirement Plan: The Alternative and illustrated by Karu Yoneshiro, was serialized on Square Enix's Manga Up! app from August 9, 2020, to November 26, 2023, with its chapters collected into ten volumes under the Gangan Comics UP! imprint.

===== First series =====
No.	Japanese release date	Japanese ISBN
1	January 27, 2018	978-4-7986-1612-4
2	August 27, 2018	978-4-7986-1757-2

===== Alternative Series =====
No.	Japanese release date	Japanese ISBN
1	February 5, 2021	978-4-7575-7081-8
2	July 7, 2021	978-4-7575-7360-4
3	October 7, 2021	978-4-7575-7514-1
4	December 7, 2021	978-4-7575-7613-1
5	May 7, 2022	978-4-7575-7906-4
6	September 7, 2022	978-4-7575-8113-5
7	January 7, 2023	978-4-7575-8333-7
8	May 6, 2023	978-4-7575-8551-5
9	October 6, 2023	978-4-7575-8831-8
10	January 6, 2024	978-4-7575-8991-9

=== Anime ===
An anime television series adaptation was announced on June 10, 2026. The series will be produced by Hotline and directed by Yūsuke Suzuki, with Gigaemon Ichikawa handling series composition and Yuki Kitajima designing the characters. It is set to premiere in 2027 on the Agaru Anime programming block on all JNN affiliates, including CBC and TBS.

== See also ==
- Reign of the Seven Spellblades, another light novel series with the same illustrator
- The Villainess Speaks Not, another light novel series with the same illustrator

== Notes ==
- ^LN represents the Light Novel of the series in the format of X.Y, whereby: X = volume, Y = chapter. Chapter A represents the afterword of the novel.
