= Ippon Again! =

Japanese anime and manga series

- Cover of Mō Ippon! volume 1 by Akita Shoten

もういっぽん! (Mō Ippon!)
- Genre: Sports (judo)
- Manga
- Written by: Yu Muraoka
- Published by: Akita Shoten
- Imprint: Shōnen Champion Comics
- Magazine: Weekly Shōnen Champion (October 18, 2018 – March 30, 2023); Manga Cross (April 6, 2023 – May 16, 2024)
- Original run: October 18, 2018 – May 16, 2024
- Volumes: 30
- Anime television series
- Directed by: Ken Ogiwara
- Written by: Aya Satsuki
- Music by: Shun Narita
- Studio: Bakken Record
- Licensed by: Sentai Filmworks: SA/SEA: Muse Communication
- Original network: TV Tokyo, TVO, TSC, BS TV Tokyo
- Original run: January 9, 2023 – April 3, 2023
- Episodes: 13
- icon

Ippon Again! (Japanese: もういっぽん!, Hepburn: Mō Ippon!) (Note: Japanese for "Another Full Point!", but translated as Ippon Again!) is a Japanese manga series written and illustrated by Yu Muraoka. It was serialized in Akita Shoten's shōnen manga magazine Weekly Shōnen Champion from October 2018 to March 2023, before being transferred to the Manga Cross website from April 2023. As of August 2024, the series has been collected in thirty tankōbon volumes. An anime television series adaptation by Bakken Record aired from January to April 2023.

== Plot ==
The story follows Michi Sonoda, a judoka who planned on quitting the sport after her final junior high judo tournament until her friend Sanae Takigawa invites her to continue together in high school.

== Characters ==
Michi Sonoda (園田 未知, Sonoda Michi)
Voiced by: Ayasa Itō
The main protagonist who's very verbal.
Sanae Takigawa (滝川 早苗, Takigawa Sanae)
Voiced by: Yukari Anzai
The best friend of Michi who grew up with her.
Towa Hiura (氷浦 永遠, Hiura Towa)
Voiced by: Chiyuki Miura
A shy girl who's way better than Michi and Sanae at judo but she was from a different junior high school.
Anna Nagumo (南雲 安奈, Nagumo Anna)
Voiced by: Nene Hieda
A girl who's from the same junior high as Michi and Sanae but she like kendo instead of judo.
Tsumugi Himeno (姫野 紬, Himeno Tsumugi)
Voiced by: Anna Nagase
Shino Natsume (夏目 紫乃, Natsume Shino)
Voiced by: Yumi Uchiyama
Sachi Minato (湊 幸, Minato Sachi)
Voiced by: Yuki Yomichi
Natsu Umehara (梅原 夏, Umehara Natsu)
Voiced by: Ai Kakuma
Kotoko Nogisaka (野木坂 琴子, Nogisaka Kotoko)
Voiced by: Ikumi Hasegawa

== Media ==
=== Manga ===
The series was serialized in Akita Shoten's shōnen manga magazine Weekly Shōnen Champion from October 18, 2018, to March 30, 2023. The series was transferred to the Manga Cross website on April 6, 2023. The series ended serialization on May 16, 2024, in its 267th chapter. Akita Shoten has collected its chapters into individual tankōbon volumes. The first volume was released on February 8, 2019. As of August 7, 2024, thirty volumes have been released.

==== Volume list ====
No.	Release date	ISBN
1	February 8, 2019	978-4-253-22803-9
2	May 8, 2019	978-4-253-22804-6
3	July 8, 2019	978-4-253-22805-3
4	September 6, 2019	978-4-253-22817-6
5	November 8, 2019	978-4-253-22818-3
6	February 7, 2020	978-4-253-22819-0
7	April 8, 2020	978-4-253-22820-6
8	July 8, 2020	978-4-253-22844-2
9	September 8, 2020	978-4-253-22845-9
10	December 8, 2020	978-4-253-21635-7
11	February 8, 2021	978-4-253-21639-5
12	April 8, 2021	978-4-253-21640-1
13	July 8, 2021	978-4-253-21712-5
14	August 6, 2021	978-4-253-21714-9
15	October 8, 2021	978-4-253-21724-8
16	December 8, 2021	978-4-253-21868-9
17	March 8, 2022	978-4-253-21869-6
18	May 6, 2022	978-4-253-21870-2
19	July 7, 2022	978-4-253-21871-9
20	October 6, 2022	978-4-253-21890-0
21	January 6, 2023	978-4-253-28306-9
22	February 8, 2023	978-4-253-28307-6
23	April 7, 2023	978-4-253-28308-3
24	July 6, 2023	978-4-253-28309-0
25	September 7, 2023	978-4-253-28310-6
26	December 7, 2023	978-4-253-28311-3
27	February 7, 2024	978-4-253-28312-0
28	April 8, 2024	978-4-253-28313-7
29	July 8, 2024	978-4-253-28314-4
30	August 7, 2024	978-4-253-28315-1

=== Anime ===
An anime adaptation was announced on the thirteenth volume of the manga on July 8, 2021. It was later revealed to be a television series produced by Bakken Record and directed by Ken Ogiwara, with Aya Satsuki handling the scripts, Airi Takekawa designing the characters and serving as chief animation director, and Shun Narita composing the music. The series aired from January 9 to April 3, 2023, on TV Tokyo and other networks. The opening theme song is "Stand By Me" by Subway Daydream, while the ending theme song is "Ipponmichi" (いっぽんみち) by Aoba Nishi High School Judo Club. Sentai Filmworks licensed the series, and will be streaming it on Hidive. Muse Communication licensed the series in Asia-Pacific.

==== Episode list ====
No.	Title	Directed by	Written by	Storyboarded by	Original release date
1	"Ippon!"; Transliteration: "Ippon!" (Japanese: いっぽん！)	Ken Ogiwara	Aya Satsuki	Ken Ogiwara	January 9, 2023
2	"Formed! Revived! Restarted!"; Transliteration: "Kessei! Fukkatsu! Saishidō!" (Japanese: 結成！復活！再始動！)	Yūzō Satō	Aya Satsuki	Yūzō Satō	January 16, 2023
3	"She Changes the Mood Entirely"; Transliteration: "Kūki, Kaete Kurerun Desu" (Japanese: 空気、変えてくれるんです)	Hideaki Uehara, Studio Bus, Kenji Shibata	Aya Satsuki	Yō Watanabe	January 23, 2023
4	"With the Three of Us, We'll be Fine"; Transliteration: "Sannin Iru kara, Daijōbu" (Japanese: 3人いるから、大丈夫)	Ken Ogiwara	Aya Satsuki	Jin Yamaishi	January 30, 2023
5	"Judo Feels So Wonderful, Doesn't It?"; Transliteration: "Kimochīi Desu ne, Jūdō tte." (Japanese: 気持ちいいですね、柔道って。)	Yoshito Hata, Studio Bus	Aya Satsuki	Hiroyuki Fukushima	February 6, 2023 (Note: This episode aired at 2:05 a.m. JST, 30 minutes after the original air time on TV Tokyo.)
6	"I Don't Want to Have Regrets"; Transliteration: "Kōkai Shitakunai kara" (Japanese: 後悔したくないから)	Yūzō Satō	Aya Satsuki	Hideaki Uehara, Daisuke Naitō	February 13, 2023
7	"Secret Weapon Senpai"; Transliteration: "Himitsu Heiki Senpai" (Japanese: 秘密兵器先輩)	Yūzō Satō	Aya Satsuki	Yūzō Satō	February 20, 2023
8	"The Continuation of That Dream"; Transliteration: "Yume no Tsuzuki" (Japanese: 夢の続き)	Shintarō Itoga	Aya Satsuki	Satoshi Nakamoto	February 27, 2023
9	"Softness Subdues Hardness"; Transliteration: "Jūyoku Gō o Seisu" (Japanese: 柔よく剛を制す)	Hideaki Uehara	Aya Satsuki	Hideaki Uehara	March 6, 2023
10	"There's An Option Besides Winning?"; Transliteration: "Katsu Igai Aru?" (Japanese: 勝つ以外ある？)	Daisuke Naitō	Aya Satsuki	Hiroyuki Kakudō	March 13, 2023
11	"Golden Era"; Transliteration: "Ōgon Jidai" (Japanese: 黄金時代)	Hiroshi Itō	Aya Satsuki	Makoto Sasaki	March 20, 2023 (Note: This episode aired at 1:45 a.m. JST, 10 minutes after the original air time on TV Tokyo.)
12	"I'm the Strongest I've Ever Been"; Transliteration: "Jibun Shijō Saikyō da kara" (Japanese: 自分史上最強だから)	Yūzō Satō	Aya Satsuki	Nozomi Fukui	March 27, 2023
13	"Another Ippon!"; Transliteration: "Mō Ippon!" (Japanese: もういっぽん！)	Ken Ogiwara	Aya Satsuki	Daisuke Naitō	April 3, 2023
