= Misuzu Yamada =

Japanese voice actress

- 山田 美鈴
- Born: June 10; Tottori Prefecture, Japan
- Occupation: Voice actress
- Years active: 2020–present
- Agent: Ancheri
- Known for: Mother of the Goddess' Dormitory as Koshi Nagumo; Classroom for Heroes as Earnest Flaming; Reign of the Seven Spellblades as Michela McFarlane
- Website: https://ancheri.co.jp/talent/misuzu_yamada.html

Misuzu Yamada (山田 美鈴, Yamada Misuzu; born June 10) is a Japanese voice actress from Tottori Prefecture who is affiliated with Link Plan. She started her career in 2020, and in 2021 played her first main role as Koshi Nagumo in the anime television series Mother of the Goddess' Dormitory. She is also known for voicing Earnest Flaming in Classroom for Heroes and Michela McFarlane in Reign of the Seven Spellblades.

== Biography ==
During her high school years, Yamada was a member of her school's archery and broadcasting clubs. Her first involvement in the voice acting industry came in 2015 when, during her second year of high school, she was selected to represent Tottori Prefecture in a national voice acting competition. Prior to starting her voice acting career, she worked as a nursery school teacher in Tokyo. She became affiliated with the talent agency Link Plan after training at a voice acting school run by the agency Pro-Fit.

In 2021, Yamada played her first main role in an anime series, voicing the protagonist Koshi Nagumo in Mother of the Goddess' Dormitory. The following year, she was cast as Weronika in the multimedia franchise D4DJ, Weronika being a member of the unit Abyssmare. That same year, she gave a talk to elementary school students in Tokyo about the voice acting profession. In 2023, she was cast as the characters Earnest Flaming in Classroom for Heroes and Michela McFarlane in Reign of the Seven Spellblades.

== Personal life ==
Yamada's hobbies include watching stage musicals and performances, as well as origami and kendama. She also has a teaching license and is qualified to teach nursery and kindergarten.

== Filmography ==
=== Anime ===
2021

- Mother of the Goddess' Dormitory, Koushi Nagumo

2023

- Classroom for Heroes, Earnest Flaming
- Reign of the Seven Spellblades, Michela MacFarlane
- The 100 Girlfriends Who Really, Really, Really, Really, Really Love You, Anonymous Friend "A"

2024

- The Stories of Girls Who Couldn't Be Magicians, Yuzu Edel

2025

- Ruri Rocks, Aoi Kasamaru

=== Video games ===
- D4DJ Groovy Mix, Weronika

=== Anime films ===
2023

- Idol Bu Show, Nina
