= List of Future Diary episodes =

Future Diary (未来日記, Mirai Nikki) is a Japanese anime series based on Sakae Esuno'a manga series of the same name. The plot depicts the Diary Game, a deadly battle royal between 12 different individuals who are given "Future Diaries", special diaries that can predict the future, by Deus Ex Machina, the God of Time and Space, with the last survivor becoming his heir. The series follows Yukiteru Amano, a socially awkward boy and one of the game's contestants who only wants to survive; Yuno Gasai, another one of the game's contestants and a friend, who would do anything to be with Yuki; Minene Uryū, another contestant who is an infamous spy with a grudge against God; and Aru Akise, a genius teen detective and a friend of Yuki, who investigates the true purpose of the game and Yuno's dark secrets.

The anime is produced by Asread, directed by Naoto Hosoda, written by Katsuhiko Takayama, the character designed by Hidetsugu Hirayama, and art direction by Toshiyuki Tokuda. The series aired on Chiba TV and TV Saitama, from October 10, 2011 to April 16, 2012. The series is licensed by Funimation in North America and Kazé in the United Kingdom. An original video animation based on the spin-off manga, Future Diary: Redial, was streamed on Niconico on June 19, 2013, and released on DVD with the manga volume in July 2013. The first opening and ending theme songs are "Kūsō Mesorogī" (空想メソロギヰ; "Fantasy Mythology") by Yousei Teikoku and "Blood-teller" by Faylan, respectively, which aired from episode 1 to 14. From episode 15, the second opening and ending theme songs are "Dead End" by Faylan and "Filament" by Yousei Teikoku, respectively. For the ninth volume of the BD/DVD release and the Redial OVA, the opening theme is "Kyouki Chinden" (狂気沈殿, Madness Precipitation) by Teikoku whilst the ending theme is "Happy End" by Faylan.

All episode titles are terms related to modern cellphones and telephone business in general, reflecting the fact that most Future Diaries are based on their users' mobile phones. Murmur appears in a segment of backstories at the end of every episodes with various characters in the anime series.

== Episode list ==
=== Future Diary ===
No.	Title	Original release date
1	"Sign Up"; Transliteration: "Sain Appu" (Japanese: サインアップ)	October 10, 2011
Yukiteru Amano is a loner who spends his time texting in his cellphone diary, playing darts and talking to his imaginary friend, Deus Ex Machina, the God of Time and Space. One day, he finds a diary entry for the day filled in already, and the events recounted in the diary strangely start coming true. Yuki is then startled upon learning that Deus is an actual deity, who reveals to Yuki that his diary can now predict his future, but also warns him that he will die if his diary is destroyed. As Yuki starts using the diary to his advantage, he is approached and stalked by model student Yuno Gasai, who possesses the Second Future Diary, which foretold his death at the hands of his homeroom teacher Takao Hiyama, secretly a serial killer who owns the Third Future Diary. As Yuno helps Yuki evade Takao, Yuki hits Takao's cellphone with a dart, causing Takao to vanish into a vortex. Afterwards, Deus summons a congress and explains the rules of the survival game to the remaining eleven Future Diary Holders, including Yuki and Yuno, in which they must try to kill each other in order to win the right and succeed him.
2	"Contract Terms"; Transliteration: "Keiyaku Jōken" (Japanese: 契約条件)	October 17, 2011
Minene Uryū, a terrorist and the Ninth Future Diary Holder, holds the school hostage, having rigged the corridors with motion sensor bombs. As Yuki combines his ability to predict everything happening around him with Yuno's ability to predict everything happening to Yuki himself, the two manage to evade danger, until Minene threatens to detonate all the bombs unless Yuki surrenders. Yuki is captured by his classmates, angering Yuno, who runs down the corridors and causes several classrooms to explode on purpose. Yuki and Minene are soon confronted by police officer Keigo Kurusu, the Fourth Future Diary Holder predicting the crimes. Keigo, who is Minene's true target, reveals he is not interested in the survival game and just wants to stop criminals. Yuno, Keigo, and all the classmates work together to distract Minene, allowing Yuki to throw a dart at her Future Diary cellphone. However, Minene dodges it, injuring her left eye and using her ability to escape. In the aftermath, Keigo forms an alliance with Yuki and Yuno to stop the other Future Diary Holders.
3	"Initial Failure"; Transliteration: "Shoki Furyō" (Japanese: 初期不良)	October 24, 2011
Keigo sends Yuki and Yuno to an amusement park to act as bait for Minene. When Yuki asks Yuno why she keeps following him around all day, she reminds him of when they first met a year earlier. Yuki was depressed over his parents' divorce, and Yuno offered to marry him in the future to cheer him up. Although Yuki realizes Yuno is still hiding something from him, she refuses to divulge anything more. That night, Yuno invites Yuki to stop by her house. While searching for the bathroom, he opens a bizarre door to a room containing three decomposed corpses, an act which changes the future of every Future Diary Holder drastically and causes a causality continuum breakdown, much to Deus's excitement. Terrified, Yuki runs home, only to find Yuno right outside the door. Meanwhile, Minene finds evading the police difficult, despite her ability to secure escape routes. Exhausted and cornered, she is approached by a mysterious man, who offers to save her and takes her to a hut in the woods. There, he reveals himself as a Future Diary Holder, drugging and torturing her to get information on other Future Diary Holders.
4	"Hand-Written"; Transliteration: "Tegaki Nyūryoku" (Japanese: 手書き入力)	October 31, 2011
Yuki cannot tell anyone about the corpses he saw in Yuno's house, fearing she will find out through her diary. The next day, Yuki, Yuno, and Keigo visit the Omekata cult, where Minene is being held prisoner underground. The cult's leader, Tsubaki Kasugano, who is the Sixth Future Diary Holder with the ability to view from a scroll what is seen by her followers, foretells her own death by the end of the day. Since Yuki has already evaded death twice, Tsubaki asks for him to stay with her for the night in exchange for handing over Minene, which he accepts, much to Yuno's resentment. At night, Tsubaki's followers fall under the mind control of the Twelfth Future Diary Holder, Yomotsu Hirasaka, a blind and insane man bearing a large one-eyed mask who captured Minene, and close in on Yuki, Yuno, and Tsubaki. Yuno starts hacking at the followers with an axe and poses an ultimatum to Yuki, that is to either join her or die.
5	"Voice Message"; Transliteration: "Boisu Memo" (Japanese: ボイスメモ)	November 7, 2011
In a flashback, Tsubaki became the priestess of the Omekata cult after her parents fooled people of her clairvoyance, but she was raped by the male followers after her parents died in a car accident and lost a ball that once belonged to her mother that helped maintained her sanity. In the present, as Yuki, Yuno, and Tsubaki flee, they are halted by Yomotsu with four hypnotized cult members dressed like him, who explain that he used the diary from his tape recorder to find Tsubaki, intending to kill her using an explosive device inside of him. Since Yomotsu is blind, Yuno manages to tell him apart from the others and kill him. After Tsubaki reveals to Yuki and Yuno that her plan all along was to kill them, Yuno cuts off Tsubaki's right hand and gives Yuki her cellphone, before collapsing from exhaustion and being captured. Yuki avoids them undetected using both diaries, but Tsubaki lures him out by announcing Yuno will be raped and killed by her followers. He manages to reach Yuno in time, but Tsubaki gloats that her scroll will predict his every action as long as he is in sight of her followers. Yuki throws Tsubaki's ball he found earlier up in the air, causing all of her followers to look at it. As her diary is rendered useless, Yuki throws a dart at her scroll and pierces it, causing her to vanish, and allowing Yuki and Yuno to escape. Meanwhile, Minene, who was released by Yomotsu, later gets captured by Keigo, who releases her in return for her contact information.
6	"Silent Mode"; Transliteration: "Manā Mōdo" (Japanese: マナーモード)	November 14, 2011
Knowing from her diary that Yuki's mother, Rea, is coming home from work abroad as a video game programmer, Yuno breaks into his house with the intention of introducing herself to Rea. Despite Yuki's efforts, Rea and Yuno meet, and take a liking to each other, sharing a good dinner and viewing Yuki's baby pictures, much to his embarrassment. Elsewhere, Minene gets her eye checked and catches sight of a few little children, especially one in particular. That night, Yuno reveals to Yuki that her diary predicts they will "become one" on July 28, and tells him she will do anything to make sure that future comes to pass. The next day, Rea brings home a young boy whose parents were killed at the Omekata cult incident, Reisuke Houjou, who, unbeknownst to everyone, is a Future Diary Holder.
7	"Answering Machine"; Transliteration: "Rusu Ōtō" (Japanese: 留守応答)	November 21, 2011
Reisuke, the Fifth Future Diary Holder with a coloring book to predict in the day and night, makes several attempts to kill Yuki and Yuno, but the two of them thwart his attempts, soon realizing who he is. Yuki searches vigorously for Reisuke's diary in vain, while Yuno insists killing him would be faster. Yuno gives up and starts chasing Reisuke around the house with a hammer and accidentally hits Rea in the head and knocks her out. Yuno figures out that Reisuke has mailed his diary to himself in order to hide it and has Yuki intercept the delivery, but he falls prey to a nerve gas trap hidden in the envelope. Reisuke challenges Yuno to a hide-and-seek game inside the house filled with nerve gas, promising the antidote if she manages to capture him. Although Yuno evades numerous traps set by Reisuke, she finds herself at his mercy. However, Yuki intervenes, injuring Reisuke with a dart and giving Yuno the resolve and opportunity to finish him off. Yuki and Yuno collapse before managing to use the antidote, but Minene, who has been informed about the situation from Keigo, appears and saves them. As she walks away, she says that Yuki must kill Yuno, before she becomes an enemy.
8	"New Model"; Transliteration: "Shin Kishu" (Japanese: 新機種)	November 28, 2011
Karyuudo Tsukishima, the Tenth Future Diary Holder, requests to transfer his diary's ownership when Deus calls a meeting for the eight surviving Future Diary Holders. Two weeks after Reisuke's disappearance, Yuki and Yuno transfer to a new school, while a group of serial killers are terrorizing the area. After school, Yuki and Yuno sneak in one of the crime scenes with Yuki's classmates, Ouji Kosaka, Hinata Hino, and Mao Nonosaka. When Hinata wanders off, Yuki's diary predicts her being attacked. Yuki rushes everyone to the scene, where they find Hinata's body before a pack of vicious dogs. A strange boy named Aru Akise appears and leads everyone to a nearby observation tower. Aru explains that he is one of Yuki's classmates and that he has been investigating the strange events in which Yuki keeps getting involved. Despite Yuno's mistrust in everyone, Yuki decides to reveal the existence of his diary in order to defend the group against the dogs. After they retreat, Mao takes Yuki's diary at knifepoint and hands it to Hinata, who is alive and well. After knowing Hinata is a Future Diary Holder, she reveals that her real target is Aru, suspecting him as a Future Diary Holder.
9	"Blocking Calls"; Transliteration: "Chakushin Kyohi" (Japanese: 着信拒否)	December 5, 2011
A week ago, Hinata received her diary, with the ability to control dogs on her command, from her dog breeder father Karyuudo, who wanted her to eliminate Aru. Back in the present day, Aru challenges Hinata to guess which hand he is hiding a coin in, with his diary as the forfeit. Despite using Yuki's diary, Hinata loses and has to release Yuki. However, Yuno realizes that Aru is not a Future Diary Holder, relying on bluff and observation instead. Aru proposes one more round of his game, with Yuki's diary on the line. He manages to guess correctly this time, seeing that Yuki's diary predicts what only Yuki perceives. Mao attempts to destroy Yuki's diary, but Yuno injures her. Yuki, Yuno, Aru, and Kosaka leave the park, while Hinata uses her diary to send the dog pack after them. Before Yuki decides to reason with Hinata, Yuno reaches her first and threatens to kill her. To pacify Yuno, Yuki forcefully becomes her boyfriend. Karyuudo communicates with everyone via radio, explaining that he mistook Aru as a Future Diary Holder, and after he warns Yuki about Keigo, who kills Karyuudo.
10	"Family Plan"; Transliteration: "Kazoku Puran" (Japanese: 家族プラン)	December 12, 2011
While making bombs for Keigo, Minene remembers the time when she was captured by a detective named Masumi Nishijima while confronting Takao. Although they developed a rapport as they evaded and defeated the killer, Minene ended up knocking Nishijima out to escape. Aru sets up Yuki and Yuno on a date to a bridal fair for a mock wedding, where they meet Keigo's wife, Naoko, while he investigates Yuno's house. When Yuki and Yuno return, they find Aru at the door of the room with the corpses. However, the wall is demolished and the corpses are buried in a deep hole in Yuno's garden. Even though this is Yuno's doing, she has no recollection of the event, and neither of Yuki visiting her house before. Aru theorizes that Yuno's mental balance is so fragile that she modified her own memories as a defense mechanism. Meanwhile, Keigo frames Yuki and Yuno for Karyuudo's death.
11	"Service Terminated"; Transliteration: "Sābisu Shūryō" (Japanese: サービス終了)	December 19, 2011
Six days ago, Keigo forms an alliance with Minene, promising to stop pursuing her and asking her to take care of his terminally ill son, Yoi, if he is eliminated from the survival game. In the present, Yuki and Yuno get arrested by Nishijima and brought to Keigo. In the interrogation room, Keigo forces Yuki to play a rigged game of Russian roulette with his service revolver. Alerted to Keigo's treachery by her diary, Yuno knocks out the detectives guarding her and steals their guns. Just before Yuki gets shot, Yuno breaks into the room, injures Keigo and leaves with Yuki. Panicking, Yuki shoots at one of the policemen pursuing them. Keigo planned for Yuki and Yuno to commit these crimes, so that their actions can be detected by his diary. Trapped on the police station's roof, Yuki and Yuno jump off, but a truck's tarp breaks their fall. The next day, Yuki and Yuno are hiding from the police when they notice Naoko visiting a hospital. When they follow her, they get ambushed by Minene, who explodes part of the floor. After Yuki accidentally causes more of the floor to collapse, Minene allies with Yuki in order to have Yuno pull them both to safety, incurring Keigo's wrath in the process. With their deaths foretold in all three diaries, Minene, Yuki, and Yuno head to the room, where Keigo's dying son and wife are.
12	"No Service Area"; Transliteration: "Jushin Kengai" (Japanese: 受信圏外)	December 26, 2011
With the police surrounding the hospital, Minene takes Naoko and Yoi hostage, and tries to bargain with Keigo, but Keigo does not negotiate and seeks to win the survival game by himself. Yuki gets captured by the police inside the hospital, but Yuno appears holding a stun grenade when Keigo tries to apprehend him and she shoots five police men who dont even attempt to stop her. She detonates the stun grenade, knocking all three of them unconscious. Meanwhile, after setting a timed bomb which went off shortly after the flash grenade detonated, Minene tries to escape the hospital, only to run into Nishijima. After Minene explains to Nishijima about the deal she and Keigo made, and how he framed Yuki and Yuno, the two rush back into the hospital. Yuki regains consciousness and tries to shoot at Keigo, but he uses Yuno as a shield. Despite his diary predicting he will kill Yuno if he shoots, Yuki refuses to give up, proclaiming his love for her. The future somehow changes and Yuki gets a clean shot at Keigo. Minene arrives with Nishijima, who places Keigo under arrest. Keigo now has a nullified diary, as he is now the criminal. After learning his family has been rescued, Keigo asks Minene to take care of Yoi, apologizes to Yuki, and breaks his own diary, removing himself from existence. Yuki and Yuno are exonerated even though they shot, and seriously injured many people thanks to files Keigo left behind, while Minene escapes yet again. A few days later, Aru attempts to warn Yuki with a text message, but Yuno intercepts and deletes it.
13	"Number Withheld"; Transliteration: "Hitsūchi Settei" (Japanese: 非通知設定)	January 9, 2012
When Deus realizes that Murmur manipulated events to hasten Keigo's elimination, she claims she wants to end the game, before he has to retire and challenges him to a wager on the winner of the survival game, with her picking Yuno and Deus betting on Yuki. Meanwhile, Yuki and Yuno go on a stargazing trip, but Yuno alters their destination along the way. Worried about Yuki's safety, Aru calls Nishijima and they manage to narrow Yuki and Yuno's location down to a run-down holiday resort, enlisting Hinata, Mao, and Kosaka to search for them. As they split up and search the abandoned hotels, Aru and Kosaka face various traps set by Yuno, while Hinata is tricked by a text message Yuno sent from Yuki's cellphone. When the others attempt to find Hinata, they get locked in a room which starts to fill up with gas. A dazed Yuki is shown bound to a chair, with an ecstatic Yuno sitting between two skulls in her underwear as she begins to feed him.
14	"Memory Erased"; Transliteration: "Memorī Shōkyo" (Japanese: メモリー消去)	January 16, 2012
Aru talks to Yuno through her surveillance feed, revealing he dug up three corpses from her garden, two of which had recently had their skulls removed. When he threatens to give this information to the police unless she releases them, the stress causes Yuno to alter her memory again, rendering negotiations moot. As Kosaka uses his cellphone to post his will in his blog, it is apparently turned into a Future Diary by the Eighth Future Diary Holder, who addresses him as an "apprentice". Advised by Aru, Kosaka acts out his diary's predictions to crawl through a ceiling vent, reaching an amnesiac Yuno, a catatonic Yuki and a bound Hinata in the control room. His appearance causes Yuki to recover, recalling how Yuno abducted him to keep him safe until July 28. Yuno places the key to Yuki's shackles on the floor and gives the control panel key to Kosaka, allowing him to free Aru and Mao. Yuno takes advantage of Kosaka's distraction and shoots at him with a crossbow. However, Hinata frees Yuki with the key. Yuki berates Yuno and leaves her at the building, before the diary predicts the imminent arrival of three Future Diary Holders, and all apprentices of the Eighth Future Diary Holder.
15	"Double Holder"; Transliteration: "Daburu Horudā" (Japanese: ダブルホルダー)	January 23, 2012
Deus informs Yuki that the Eighth Future Diary Holder has the ability to host and send predictions to the blogs of her apprentices via a server. When Yuki's diary predicts an attack by the three apprentices, Aru has him moved to Kosaka's mansion. His plan is to lure the apprentices in, then deactivate the area's cellphone tower, severing their connection to the server of the Eighth Future Diary Holder. Once the attack begins, however, Yuno appears and plans to disable the remote control tower, wanting to defend Yuki. Aru and Kosaka rush to deactivate the tower manually, while Yuki keeps Yuno in restraints. Two of the apprentices, Marco Ikusaba and Ai Mikami, manage to corner Yuki and Yuno by the time Aru deactivates the tower. However, Marco and Ai showcase their bona fide diaries, which have remained unaffected, revealing that they are both the Seventh Future Diary Holder. With no other choice, Yuki releases Yuno, who intimidates the couple into retreating. However, when the third apprentice, Tarou Nanba, sets the mansion on fire, Marco and Ai counterattack. Their ability to predict each other's actions manages to overwhelm Yuno, resulting in her and Yuki getting injured and their diaries taken away. As Yuki and his friends are brooding in the hospital, they discover Minene, disguised as a nurse.
16	"Repair"; Transliteration: "Shūri" (Japanese: 修理)	January 30, 2012
Aru deduces that Marco and Ai did not destroy Yuki and Yuno's diaries because they want to take advantage of the information they provide. In order to confuse them, he has Minene feed Yuki false information. Yuki's divorced father Kurou Amano visits him in the hospital, but while Yuki's away, he searches the room for his cellphone. Yuno overhears that he has promised to destroy it in return for the cancellation of his substantial debt and realizes he is being used by the Eleventh Future Diary Holder. Marco, who has learned all about the situation from Yuki's diary, considers Kurou as a useful link to Minene and the Eleventh Future Diary Holder and calls Yuno, demanding that they bring Kurou to an abandoned commercial tower. Once they arrive, Marco places Yuki and Yuno's cellphones on a table and attacks Kurou. As Yuki futilely fights Marco, his father goes over to the table and breaks his cellphone, yet nothing happens. Realizing that the cellphones were decoys, Yuno attacks Ai and successfully retrieves both diaries. Just then, Tarou sets off explosives, collapsing the floor under Yuki, and Kurou and Yuno reach out to grab him. Meanwhile, Nishijima has uncovered the identity of Eighth Future Diary Holder as a children's caretaker named Kamado Ueshita, and goes to search the orphanage.
17	"Family Discount"; Transliteration: "Kazoku Wari" (Japanese: 家族割り)	February 6, 2012
In a flashback, Marco and Ai are abandoned children who meet in the commercial tower, grow up in Kamado's orphanage and eventually fall in love. In the present, Yuki chooses to take Yuno's hand, while Marco and Ai run to the crumbling tower's roof with Yuki's father, intending to jump off with parachutes. Yuno catches up to them and once again tries to fight them alone, while Yuki hides and attempts to help her with his diary's predictions. Yuno loses and has her cellphone taken away, but it turns out to be Marco and Ai's decoy, which distracts them with false predictions. As a result, Yuno manages to critically injure Ai. Kurou grabs one of the two parachutes and escapes the tower, but he runs into his ex-wife Rea, who has been informed of the situation by Nishijima. When she threatens to turn him in, he stabs her. Yuki, Yuno and a dying Ai are trapped in the wreckage, but Marco attempts to free Ai despite having been mortally wounded himself. With Yuki and Yuno's help, the debris is cleared out and Marco and Ai die together as the tower collapses. Meanwhile, Nishijima cannot find Kamado's Future Diary server. Yuki and Yuno escape using the second parachute, only to find Rea dead.
18	"Crossed Lines"; Transliteration: "Konsen" (Japanese: 混線)	February 13, 2012
A year ago, Yuki was paired with Moe Wakaba, a classmate of his, to purchase supplies for an upcoming school festival, preparing to give her a love letter at the right moment. In the mall, Yuno, wearing a bunny suit, made several attempts to stop Yuki, but she is caught by the security guards. In the past flashback, Yuno killed her adoptive parents Saika and Ushio, a pair of bankers who abused her when she failed to meet their standards. In the present day, after Yuki asks Deus to resurrect Rea, Deus reveals that he is dying and his powers have faded, explaining that all of existence will collapse unless a successor is determined soon. When the injured Kurou returns home, Yuki demands him to turn himself in for killing Rea, although there is no actual evidence to comply. The next day, Yuki trails Kurou from a pawn shop to a local shrine hoping for evidence, but it turns out that Kurou wanted to visit the site where his family was going to go stargazing before he turned himself in. While reconciling with Yuki, Kurou is suddenly stabbed in the chest with a knife. Yuki is ambushed by agents of the Eleventh Future Diary Holder. He manages to fight back and kill them. After Yuno arrives to help him, Yuki declares that he is now determined to win the survival game in order to attain the power to resurrect his parents. When he tells Yuno this means he has to kill her, she calmly replies that she is ready to die for him at any time.
19	"Clear Data"; Transliteration: "Zenken Sakujo" (Japanese: 全件削除)	February 20, 2012
John Balks, the mayor of Sakurami City, convincingly passes a motion to have Kamado's orphanage shut down, and he later attends Deus's meeting, where Yuki exposes his identity as the Eleventh Future Diary Holder, after much research about him five days earlier. Minene relays this news to Nishijima, who reveals his reassignment as one of Balks's bodyguard and his discovery that Yuno was adopted. Yuno, theorizing that Balks wants to seize Kamado's server, has Yuki form an alliance with Kamado to have her apprentices ambush Balks while driving on a country road. However, Balks uses a jammer to sever connections to Kamado's server. In anticipation of this, Yuki and Yuno betray Kamado and slaughter her defenseless apprentices, prompting Kamado to flee in Balks's car while Yuki and Yuno give chase, eventually cornering them. Minene appears with Aru, who retrieves Yuno's umbilical cord from the orphanage, revealing that the DNA matches with the third corpse. This means that the real Yuno has died and the other one Yuki recognized is a true impostor.
20	"Transfer Data"; Transliteration: "Dēta Tensō" (Japanese: データ転送)	February 27, 2012
Despite Aru's revelation, Yuki declares his trust in Yuno. Balks connects Kamado's server to HOLON, a supercomputer which holds user accounts of every citizen of the city, making them his apprentices. Minene tries to attack Balks, but his diary lets him turn the tables. Nishijima, who has fallen in love with Minene, comes to her aid and destroys the supercomputer. However, it turns out to be only one part of the whole, and Balks's plan is put into motion. As Aru sends Hinata, Mao, and Kosaka to help Minene and Nishijima destroy the remaining parts of HOLON, Minene figures out Balks's diary can read the predictions of all other Future Diaries. Deus reveals to Minene that Balks helped him design the Future Diaries, wishing to grant divine power to the human race. Minene, Nishijima, Hinata, Mao, and Kosaka storm HOLON's location, overwriting their diaries' predictions to confuse Balks. In response, Balks makes use of the diary of his secretary, Ryuji Kurosaki, captures Hinata, Mao, and Kosaka, injures Minene, and kill Nishijima. Minene is saved by Yuki and Yuno, who have used her as bait to get to Balks.
21	"Security Code"; Transliteration: "Anshō Bangō" (Japanese: 暗証番号)	March 12, 2012
Yuki and Yuno wreak havoc, demanding that Balks release their friends and commit suicide, by using his position as mayor against him. Balks locks himself in a double-door bank vault in Gasai Bank, which can only be unlocked via retina scan by himself, Yuno's parents or the real Yuno. Since Yuki can no longer eliminate Balks for her, Minene starts hunting Yuki down, reminiscing how she lost her parents in the Middle East as a child and grew up under the constant threat of death. At the same time, Yuno frees Hinata, Mao, and Kosaka, and chases Kamado, but she is stopped by Aru. In a tense showdown, Minene gains a clear shot at Yuki but sees her child self standing beside him, letting Yuki shoot Minene in the torso. Minene destroys her diary voluntarily in order to detonate a bomb triggered by her death, intending to destroy the vault for Yuki, yet the vault withstands the blast. Yuno arrives to send Yuki away to destroy HOLON, and she somehow manages to open the vault and kill Balks. A few days later, Aru expresses his distrust in Yuno to Kamado, Hinata, Mao and Kosaka after he witnessed her opening the vault via retina scan despite being an impostor, while Yuki shows Yuno his list of the deceased Future Diary Holders. Suddenly, dark vortexes appear all over the city due to Deus's lifespan decaying. While Murmur is panicking over the world ending sooner than expected, Kamado appears with Aru, who asks Deus if Yuki could revert anything in the world if he was the successor.
22	"Disconnect"; Transliteration: "Setsudan" (Japanese: 切断)	March 19, 2012
A shocked Aru attempts to inform Yuki of Deus's answer, but Deus stops Aru, revealing that Aru is an entity created by him to observe and record information on the survival game and its players. Deus starts disassembling Aru, promising to spare him if he proves he has done anything out of his own free will, but Aru succeeds when he reveals he had Kamado make his cellphone into an apprentice detective diary, demonstrating his will to change the future and save Yuki. Yuno asks Yuki if he has the will to kill his friends if they end up betraying him. As they arrive at Aru's apartment to kill Kamado, Yuno is held off by Aru while Yuki chases after Kamado and his friends. When he runs into Hinata, he learns Deus told Aru the divine power bestowed to the winner of the survival game can bring bodies back from the dead, but not the soul. Meanwhile, Yuno stabs herself, since Aru countered all of her attacks. After Aru patches up Yuno's wound, he rushes to the scene. Yuno calls Yuki to prevent Aru from contacting him and tells him Aru tried to kill her and that he should not trust any of his friends. Out of rage and fear, Yuki ends up shooting Hinata, Mao, and Kosaka, still believing he can revive them after he becomes a god. Aru finally arrives and warns Yuki that Yuno plans on killing him at the very end to win the game. When Yuno arrives, Aru kisses Yuki, enraging Yuno. Aru and Yuno commence fighting, and Aru damages her cellphone, but Yuno pulls out a second cellphone and slashes at Aru's throat. As Yuno kills Kamado, a dying Aru, who knows the first diary he destroyed was real, suddenly has an epiphany about Yuno. Since he can no longer talk, he writes a message in his cellphone and shows it to Yuki, allowing Yuno to finish him off as Deus begins to collapse.
23	"Unfulfilled Contract"; Transliteration: "Keiyaku Furikō" (Japanese: 契約不履行)	March 26, 2012
Murmur proclaims herself as Deus's successor until his death and the end of the world on July 28. Yuno reminds Yuki about her diary's prediction that they will "become one" on that day. As the days pass, Yuki eventually admits to himself that his friends were probably telling the truth, as he reminisce the events that took place in the city. Since he cannot understand why Yuno would lie to him about the possibility of resurrecting people, he decides to get the truth from her by fulfilling her diary's prediction one day earlier and makes love to her. He confronts her as to why she would lie to him, but she responds by saying she just wanted to console him and asks him to kill her. Yuki refuses and instead suggests that they die together. When he mentions Aru's message, which claimed that "this is a second universe where Yuno has already become a goddess and has gone back in time", Yuno attacks him. As Yuki flees, he is intercepted by Murmur, who shows him visions of the past which confirms that Yuno has indeed played the survival game once before. In the "First World", Yuki's alter ego and Yuno ended up as the last contestants and both agreed to commit a double suicide from overdosing rather than having to kill the other, but Yuno faked her death, thinking she could revive Yuki as a goddess. When she discovered in real life she could not restore souls, Yuno traveled back two years in the past and killed her other self as a child, taking her place in the "Second World". Yuki sadly discovers this, breaks out of the visions, and confronts the First World Yuno.
24	"Searching"; Transliteration: "Kensakuchū" (Japanese: 検索中)	April 2, 2012
As the Cathedral of Causality raises, Yuno expresses her disgust at how this state of affairs prevents her and Yuki from ever surviving together. She states that since Yuki will not kill her, she will kill him and travel back in time again to meet another Yuki. Murmur shoves Yuki off a cliff, but he is saved by the sudden reappearance of Minene, who displays powers similar to that of Murmur. As Murmur and Yuno travel two years back in time to a "Third World", Minene and Yuki follow them. Minene explains to Yuki that when Deus realized Murmur was favoring Yuno, he suspected them of being from another timeline. In order to ensure the fair running of the game, he imparted Minene with part of his power, although she did not know so at the time. Knowing Yuno will kill her past self in the real world, Yuki goes to her house with Minene. When Yuki finds Third World Yuno trapped in a cage at the house, he calls for an ambulance, despite Minene's warnings about interfering with the past. As Yuno and Murmur arrive with the Third World Rea and Kurou hostage, Minene and Yuki flee with Third World Yuno in tow, while Minene lectures Yuki that the parents in the Third World are not his.
25	"Reset"; Transliteration: "Risetto" (Japanese: リセット)	April 9, 2012
An ambulance arrives at Yuno's house together with the Third World Ushio. Although he is a much more caring man in this world, ready to act upon confirmation that his wife is abusing Yuno, Yuno has to stab him when he starts getting suspicious of her. Minene drops off Yuki and Third World Yuno at the school and makes a phone call to the Third World Keigo, forewarning him about his son's illness. Yuki evades Yuno and Murmur's attacks, trying to convince Yuno to return to the Second World and rule as its goddess. However, Yuno, torn between her feelings for Yuki and the inevitability of the Second World's destruction unless one of them dies, decides to trap him in an illusionary "ideal" world where his parents are alive and she has never existed. Minene returns and fights Murmur, but she is overwhelmed once Yuno releases a seal on Murmur's powers. In the illusionary world, Yuki soon realizes he fell in love with Yuno because she was his life supporter. Keigo and Nishijima head for the explosion scene. With Minene beaten, Yuno approaches her other self.
26	"Format"; Transliteration: "Shokika" (Japanese: 初期化)	April 16, 2012
After some hesitation at seeing the innocence of her Third World self, Yuno lunges at her, but she is stopped by her Third World parents. As the police arrived, Keigo confronts Yuno, and Nishijima rescues Minene. Meanwhile, the actions of Yuki and Minene have caused a positive domino effect that changed the future of every Future Diary Holder. When Balks's incomplete diary reads the results in Yuki's diary, he calls off his partnership with Deus, cancelling the survival game and must find another method to determine his successor. Yuki manages to remember Yuno and break free from the illusionary world, while releasing the Second World Murmur, who had been trapped by her First World self in order to impersonate her. Faced with Yuki's love and her Third World self's united family, Yuno's resolve to kill them all is lost, and she kills herself. A horrified Yuki is declared the winner of the survival game by the Second World Murmur, and is spirited away through a vortex. In the Third World, almost all Future Diary Holders are enjoying their new and peaceful lives. Yuno's relationship with her parents improves and she gets many friends, although she does not know Yuki. As ten thousand years passed in the Second World, Yuki is still grieving about Yuno in his now empty universe, refusing to create anything as a god. Murmur tried tirelessly to comfort him, but to no avail, since he just keeps staring at the last entry of his phone. However, the last entry changes and indicates that Yuno is somehow still alive.

=== Future Diary: Redial ===
No.	Title	Original release date
OVA	"Data Migration"; Transliteration: "Dēta Ikō" (Japanese: データ移行)	June 19, 2013
Two years later in the Third World, Yuno has an uneasy feeling when she hangs out at the beach with Hinata, Mao, Ouji, Aru, and Reisuke, during summer camp. They go to a gift shop run by Yomotsu, though he comes across as creepy since his products are dedicated to his secret alter ego. Kosaka gets the wrong message, when Ai and Orin Miyashiro invite him to the staff room. In the Cathedral of Causality, Minene declines the offer of being the successor to Deus Ex Machina in the Third World. Aru continues to be an observer for Deus without rebellion, and Deus contemplates of just letting the world end, despite protests from Third World Murmur. John Bacchus repeatedly calls Deus and suggests new ideas for battle royales, but a disdained Deus sends Bacchus back before allowing him to finish his explanations. At night before bedtime, Yuno checks her cellphone and feels like she is forgetting something important. After Yuno departs from her friends from summer camp, she returns home later on the evening of July 27. Yuno hears a voice in her head and is teleported into the Cathedral of Causality at midnight with a desire to meet someone. With help and motivation from Minene and Aru, Yuno heads to the central tower and finds the imprisoned First World Murmur, who gives her the memories of the First World Yuno stored in the form of a gem. Deus states to Minene and Murmur that the bond between Yuki and Yuno is strong enough to continue in all three separate worlds. As Yuno gains the memories of her other self, she is chosen as the goddess of the Third World, creating a pathway to the Second World and finally reuniting with Yuki. Yuno enters at the point where Yuki's future in his cellphone changes. They reunite, embrace, and prepare to fulfill their promise of stargazing together.
