= List of Future Diary chapters =

Future Diary is a Japanese manga series written and illustrated by Sakae Esuno. The manga was serialized in Kadokawa Shoten's Shōnen Ace magazine from January 26, 2006, to December 25, 2010 and was compiled into 12 volumes published by Kadokawa Shoten, plus two side-story manga, Future Diary: Mosaic and Future Diary: Paradox, compiled in one volume each. The manga was originally licensed in English by Tokyopop for North America, but only ten volumes were released before Tokyopop ceased publishing operations on May 31, 2011. The series is currently licensed by Viz Media, who released first nine volumes digitally.

An additional manga titled Future Diary: Redial (未来日記リダイヤル, Mirai Nikki Ridaiyaru) was previewed in the May 2013 issue of Shōnen Ace sold on March 26, 2013, and a single volume of Redial was released in July 2013.

== Volume list ==
=== Future Diary ===
No.	Original release date	Original ISBN	English release date	English ISBN
1	July 26, 2006	978-4-04-713839-1	May 12, 2009	978-1-4278-1557-6
1. "Future Diary" (未来日記, Mirai Nikki); 2. "Concentration / The 12 Future Diary Holders" (結集 / 未来日記12人衆, Kesshū / Mirai Nikki 12 Ninshu); 3. "Heart's Bomb" (心音爆弾, Shin'on Bakudan); 4. "Birth / Future Alliance" (誕生 / 未来同盟, Tanjō / Mirai Dōmei)
2	October 26, 2006	978-4-04-713872-8	June 9, 2009	978-1-4278-1558-3
5. "Yuno Gasai's Secret" (我妻由乃の秘密, Gasai Yuno no Himitsu); 6. "6th / Visual Pitfall" (6th / 視覚の罠, 6th / Shikaku no Wana); 7. "Who's Crazy" (誰が狂人だ?, Dare ga Kyōjinda?); 8. "Vision vs. Hearing" (視覚 vs 聴覚, Shikaku vs Chōkaku)
3	March 26, 2007	978-4-04-713912-1	September 9, 2009	978-1-4278-1559-0
9. "Happy End / Unhappy End"; 10. "Yuno Gasai's Happy Day" (我妻由乃の幸せな日, Gasai Yuno no Shiawase na Hi); 11. "First Day / Child Combo Kill" (初日 / お子様デスランチ, Fāsuto Dei / Oko-sama Desu Ranchi); 12. "Second Day / Suspicious Toybox" (2日目 / 疑惑のtoybox, Sekando Dei / Giwaku no Toybox); 13. "Third Day / Battlefield Playhouse" (3日目 / 戦場のままごと, Sādo Dei / Senjō no Mamagoto)
4	October 26, 2007	978-4-04-713954-1	December 1, 2009	978-1-4278-1560-6
14. "Automatically Follow" (自動追跡者, Ōtomātā); 15. "A Certain World" (或の世界, Aru no Sekai); 16. "Relatives Engage in Battle" (殺伐フレンズ, Satsubatsu Furenzu); 17. "Most Powerful of the Non-Owners" (最強の非所有者, Saikyō no Hi Shoyū-sha); 18. "Even With Killing You" (君を殺してでも, Kimi o Koroshite Demo)
5	February 26, 2008	978-4-04-715026-3	March 2, 2010	978-1-4278-1561-3
19. "Beyond the Door" (襖の向こう, Fusuma no Mukō); 20. "The Two Escape" (二人だけの逃亡, Futaridake no Tōbō); 21. "Their Dilemma" (二人の窮地, Futari no Kyūchi); 22. "Adult's Power, Children's Power" (病みと光, Yami to Hikari); 23. "The Ending World" (終わる世界, Owaru Sekai)
6	June 26, 2008	978-4-04-715072-0	June 1, 2010	978-1-4278-1630-6
24. A Blank; 25. "8th's Diary" (8thの日記, 8th no Nikki); 26. "8th / Propagation Club" (8th / 増殖倶楽部, 8th / Zōshoku Kurabu); 27. "Yukiteru Accelerates" (支える者逹, Sasaeru Mono-tachi); 28. Dummy Game
7	November 26, 2008	978-4-04-715130-7	August 31, 2010	978-1-4278-1751-8
29. "Dance of Fresh Blood" (舞えよ鮮血, Maeyo Senketsu); 30. "Family Lies" (偽りの家族, Itsuwari no Kazoku); 31. "Fissure" (亀裂, Kiretsu); 32. "Boy and Girl Revolution" (少年少女革命, Shōnen Shōjo Kakumei); 33. "The Worst Today" (最悪よ今日は, Saiaku yo Kon'nichiwa)
8	May 26, 2009	978-4-04-715248-9	November 2, 2010	978-1-4278-1761-7
34. "Broken" (壊れた, Kowareta); 35. "Inverted World" (反転世界, Hanten Sekai); 36. "Contract" (契約, Keiyaku); 37. "Yuki's Assault / Strike Back!" (雪輝強襲 / strike back!, Setsuki Kyōshū / Strike Back!); 38. DNA
9	November 26, 2009	978-4-04-715323-3	December 28, 2010	978-1-4278-0520-1
39. "Your Name" (君の名は, Kimi no Na wa); 40. "Whole Child HOLON" (全体子HOLON, Zentai-shi Holon); 41. "Owners Gather" (所有者集う, Shoyū-sha Tsudou); 42. "Dead Zone vs. Dead Zone" (死角 vs 死角, Shikaku vs Shikaku); 43. "How to Save the End" (終末の救い方, Shūmatsu no Sukui-kata)
10	March 26, 2010	978-4-04-715400-1	April 12, 2011	978-1-4278-0521-8
44. "The Gasai Bank Twin Tower Building Branch" (我妻銀行ツインタフービル支店, Gasai Ginkō Tsuintafūbiru Shiten); 45. "Last Battle vs. 9th" (VS 9th ラストバトル, VS 9th Rasuto Batoru); 46. "Conclusion" (決着, Ketchaku); 47. "All Collapse Preludes" (全ての崩壊プレリュード, Subete no Hōkai Pureryūdo); 48. "The End of Tender Lies and Deus" (優しい嘘と神代の終わり, Yasashī Uso to Kami-yo no Owari)
11	September 9, 2010 (limited edition); December 25, 2010 (regular edition)	978-4-04-900801-2 (limited edition); 978-4-04-715580-0 (regular edition)	—	—
49. "Aru Akise vs. Yuno Gasai" (秋瀬或VS我妻由乃, Akise Aru VS Gasai Yuno); 50. "Path of Mistakes" (過ちの道程, Ayamachi no Dōtei); 51. "Elucidation" (解明, Kaimei); 52. "Intertwined Bodies / Non-Intertwined Minds" (重なる体 / 重ならめ心, Kasanaru Karada / Kasanara me Kokoro); 53. "Spiral / Spiral Game" (螺旋 / スパイラルゲーム, Rasen / Supairaru Gēmu); 54. "Simply Because I Love It, I Love It" (愛しているから、愛すればこそ, Aishiteiru kara, Aisureba koso)
12	April 26, 2011	978-4-04-715679-1	—	—
55. "Release Everything from Blockage" (閉塞より全てを解放, Heisoku Yori Subete o Kaihō); 56. "My Choice" (僕の選択, Boku no Sentaku); 57. "False Liquidation" (偽りの清算, Itsuwari no Seisan); 58. "Bad Guy" (悪人, Akunin); 59. "Last Diary"

=== Extra volumes ===
No.	Japanese release date	Japanese ISBN
Mosaic	November 26, 2008	978-4-04-715129-1
Paradox	March 26, 2010	978-4-04-715412-4
Redial	July 26, 2013	978-4-04-120616-4
