= Manner Mode =

Manner Mode may refer to:

- Silent mode in Japanese mobile phone culture
- "Silent Mode" (マナーモード Manā Mōdo), a 2011 episode of Future Diary
