= List of Future Diary characters =

The Japanese manga and anime series Future Diary (未来日記, Mirai Nikki), written and illustrated by Sakae Esuno, features an extensive cast of characters. The plot depicts the Diary Game, a deadly battle royal between 12 different individuals who are given "Future Diaries," special diaries that can predict the future, by Deus ex Machina, the God of Time and Space, with the last survivor becoming his heir.

The series follows Yukiteru Amano, a socially awkward boy and one of the game's competitors who only wants to survive. Yuno Gasai, another player of the game and a friend who would do anything to be with Yuki. Minene Uryū, an infamous terrorist with a grudge against God, and Aru Akise, a genius teen detective and a friend of Yuki, who investigates the true purpose of the game and Yuno's dark secrets.

Future Diary Holders are based from the Dii Consentes or Twelve Olympians in Roman and Greek mythology.

== Protagonists ==
=== Yukiteru Amano ===
Voiced by: Misuzu Togashi (Japanese); Jessie James Grelle (English)

Yukiteru Amano (天野 雪輝, Amano Yukiteru) is the main male protagonist and hero of the series and the First Diary user. Also known as Yuki (ユッキー, Yukkī), he is a reclusive and shy 14-year-old middle school student, opting to be a bystander to incidents around him to write about them in a diary on his cell phone instead. He becomes involved as one of 12 contestants in a 90-day battle royale when, to his shock, his imaginary friend Deus turned out to be a real God of Space-Time, planning to have the sole survivor of the game succeed his throne. Yuki's ordinary diary becomes the Random Diary (無差別日記, Musabetsu Nikki), a diary capable of predicting future events happening around him from his point of view. While versatile in any situation, the diary does not state what happens to Yuki himself, and since it is written from his point of view, the entries may not always be accurate.

Unlike most of the contestants, Yuki wishes for a simple, peaceful life. Because Deus considers him a personal favourite to win, he is mainly targeted by other Diary users. Knowing he is weak, cowardly and naïve, he quickly makes friends and allies. One of these is Yuno Gasai, an obsessive stalker who is madly in love with him and will kill to protect both of them. His goal is to not kill anyone; however this outlook has changed when his divorced parents are killed because of the game and Yuno convinces him that becoming the God of Space-Time can bring them back, becoming a ruthless and dishonest player.

Eventually he learns of Yuno's true origins and intentions, finally stepping out of his role as a constant bystander to intervene in changing her future, including those of the other Diary owners that led terrible, unfortunate lives. When trapped by her in an illusionary utopia, he breaks free through his love and force of will to meet her again. A touched Yuno commits suicide to let him win the game. A distraught Yuki refuses to use his godly powers for 10,000 years, until the Third World Yuno returns to him with memories and love of the First World Yuno. As they become the gods of the third world, succeeding Deus without another death game involved.

He is named after Jupiter, the Roman god of the sky, weather and lightning.

=== Yuno Gasai ===
Voiced by: Tomosa Murata (Japanese); Brina Palencia (English)

Yuno Gasai (我妻 由乃, Gasai Yuno) is the main female protagonist and antagonist of the series and the Second Diary Holder. While a perfect model student on the surface, she is actually a psychopathic villains yandere who is obsessed with Yukiteru Amano, whom she affectionately calls "Yuki", and kills unhesitatingly to protect him. Her Future Diary is the Yukiteru Diary (雪輝日記, Yukiteru Nikki), a stalker diary that gives her explicit details on whatever Yuki is doing in the present 10 minutes. By working together with his Random Diary, they are able to solve their diaries' weaknesses.

Yuno is named after Juno, the ancient Roman goddess of love and marriage.

=== Minene Uryū ===
Voiced by: Mai Aizawa (Japanese); Emily Neves (English)

Minene Uryū (雨流 みねね, Uryū Minene) is the secondary female protagonist, the Ninth Diary user and the protagonist of the side-story manga, Future Diary: Mosaic. An infamous atheist terrorist, Minene is a young woman who has hatred against organized religion, particularly on any belief towards God. Her hatred of religion stems from her past when she and parents were traveling in a city in the Middle East but got caught in a battle which is hinted between the Israelis and Palestinians, where her parents were killed in the crossfire. Blaming God for her parents death, she leads a crusade of destruction against those associated with God. Minene got involved in the Diary game when after a failed assassination to kill a Catholic Cardinal, where as she tried to flee, she almost fell to her death but was saved by Deus who gave her an offer to save her if she join his game. Minene's diary is the Escape Diary (逃亡日記, Tōbō Nikki), which will chart out the best course of actions for her to escape whenever she finds herself in a dangerous situation. While it means she can escape anything, it is not perfect as the diary can only tell her how to escape if there are favorably conditions that allow her any chance to escape.

Originally, she wants to win the game to destroy religion worldwide but later change her mind after befriending Yuki and his friends. While she began as an antagonist against Yuki, she later became his ally, becoming a big sister figure to him and both of them hold no animosity with each other despite Minene being responsible for the destruction and deaths at his school and Yuki blinding her left eye. She shares an interesting relationship with Masumi Nishijima of the police whom she met during her failed assassination of the cardinal. While she constantly dismisses all of his attempts to get to know her, she finally relent and falls in love with Nishijima.

Together with Nishijima and Yuki's friends (without Yuki and Yuno), they invade the twin tower buildings, to kill the Eleventh. Yuki appeared only after Nishijima's death and Minene realized that Yuki was just using them as a shield when Yuki told her that he and Yuno had been following them but did not help out and let Nishijima die. Wanting to avenge Nishijima's death, Minene has a gun fight with Yuki. Despite having the advantage, she is unable to kill him as Yuki reminds her of her younger self, allowing Yuki to shoot her. Knowing that she does not have much time to live, she decides to help Yuki by blowing herself up to open the bank vault where the Eleventh is hiding in.

She fails to blow up the vault, but survives the blast, and revealed before they invade the twin tower buildings, Deus transferred his knowledge and half of his power to her, thus preventing her death. Minene rescues Yuki and travels with him to the Third World to stop Yuno from killing her other self. She also contacts Keigo Kurusu and warns him of his son's fatal heart disease, altering the future. Minene survives the final battle, and is shown to be living happily with the Third World Nishijima while having children who have inherited her godly powers and can fly, though she still stayed in contact with Deus and Murumuru.

She is named after the Roman goddess Minerva.

=== Aru Akise ===
Voiced by: Akira Ishida (Japanese); Todd Haberkorn (English)

Aru Akise (秋瀬 或, Akise Aru) is the secondary male protagonist and the protagonist of the side-story manga, Future Diary: Paradox. One of Yuki's new friends at his new school, Aru is a genius with amazing investigation skills and wants to be a great detective. He becomes involved in the Diary Game to learn the mysteries surrounding it and protect Yuki. Aru has feelings for Yuki that are beyond that of friendship, which angers Yuno. As the games continue, Aru becomes suspicious of Yuno and tries to find out what secrets is she hiding from Yuki. He soon discovers Yuno's origins but also his own when he learns about his creation by Deus as an "observer" to keep on eye on the contestant. He receives the Detective Diary from the Eighth Diary user which can make predictions based on the predictions of the other diaries. It is nearly a perfect diary, except when accounting for Aru's feelings towards Yuki, meaning he can act against what would be a perfect outcome. It also cannot detect the difference between diaries from other universes, which Yuno exploits to defeat him. Despite losing to Yuno, he continues to help Yuki and gives him the clue on Yuno's identity before she decapitates him. In the Third World, Aru is seen alive and continues as Deus' observer, with Reisuke as his detective-in-training.

Aru is the protagonist of Paradox, set in an alternate timeline after Murumuru accidentally kills Yuno and Yuki is mortally wounded by Takao Hiyama. Aru and Murumuru take their respective places as First and Second until Murumuru's alterations have been fixed. However, as the game progresses, Aru sees the horrors of it and decides to save everyone to stop the game. Altering the events of the incident with Tsubaki Kasugano, Aru is able to make allies with a majority of the diary owners. However, his attempt to stop Murumuru from erasing the timeline fails when he stumbles across Yuno and how she killed her Second World counterpart, before being cast back to the start of the survival game.

He has many parallels with Bacchus, including being created from a god and gaining supernatural insight later in life.

== Diary Game contestants and judges ==
=== Diary Holders ===
==== Takao Hiyama ====
Voiced by: Jin Domon (Japanese); Jason Douglas (English)

Takao Hiyama (火山 高夫, Hiyama Takao), the Third Diary user, is Yuki's school teacher who is secretly a serial killer who wears a heavy bulletproof trenchcoat with a hat and mask that hides his identity. Takao's diary is the Murder Diary (殺人日記, Satsujin Nikki) which gives him details on who his next victims are and where and how he kills them. While the diary helps him locate his victims and prevent them from escaping, it does not tell him what to do if his victims will fight back; thus, he can be easily defeated. Takao figured out that Yuki holds a diary as well since Yuki used his diary to improve his grades. Takao heads to Yuki's apartment to kill him, but Yuno shows up and takes him to the roof. Yuno uses her phone as a surveillance camera so Yuki can see where Takao is through his own phone while sitting on the roof's ledge. Yuno runs out of the corner to surprise and distract Takao, while Yuki pops up to attack him. He was killed when Yukiteru pierced his diary with a dart.

It is revealed by Murumuru that Takao repeatedly accidentally killed himself when she was presenting him with his Future Diary. First was when he thought she was a witness to his recent killing and sliced the phone, and then thinking the phone was evidence, he destroyed it again. She admitted she suspected he would be the first to go because of his paranoid personality.

In the alternate universe, he is captured by Yomotsu Hirasaka, and put in prison in the anime.

His surname, Hiyama (literally "fire mountain") comes from the Roman god Vulcan.

==== Keigo Kurusu ====
Voiced by: Masahiko Tanaka (Japanese); Robert McCollum (English)

Keigo Kurusu (来須 圭悟, Kurusu Keigo), the Fourth Diary user, is a police captain who was chosen for the Diary Game to balance out the other Diary users who were much worse. A composed and calm person, Keigo has no interest in the game and wants to find a way to stop it before more people get hurt, subsequently becoming Yuki's ally. His diary is the Criminal Investigation Diary (捜査日記, Sōsa Nikki), which gives him details of crimes that will happen within the next 90 days, but it cannot predict the future of an investigation done by someone other than himself.

He is introduced helping Yuki and Yuno against Minene after she terrorize their school and latter forms an alliance with them to find and stop the other Diary users. Thanks to his position, he provides police intel for Yuki and Yuno. Later, he joins them to the Omekata cult's shrine where its leader, Tsubaki has held Minene prisoner. While offering Minene to the trio in exchange for help avoiding her own Dead End, they are attacked by Tsubaki's hypnotized cult under the Twelfth's control. At this point, Keigo goes to retrieve Minene, and the two are forced to watch as the Twelfth is killed and Tsubaki betrays Yuki and Yuno, only to die herself. After the battle Keigo helps Minene escape in exchange she becomes his informant and protect his son who is hospitalized due to his condition.

But upon learning that his son's condition is not improving and will die in several weeks, Keigo, desperate to save his son's life, decides to play and win the game. After killing the Tenth Diary user Karyuudo (making him the only Diary user aside from Yuki or Yuno to kill another contestant in the Survival game), he frames Yuki and Yuno for trying to kill him and has the police go on a manhunt for them with orders to shoot to kill on sight. Yuki and Yuno hides at the hospital where Keigo's wife and son are. Minene helps Keigo, but finds out Keigo will kill her after she does so she creates a new future diary alliance with them. Keigo soon has the hospital surrounded and personally leads the SWAT police to kill Yuki, Yuno, Minene and save his family. But unbeknownst to him, Minene was able to sneak out and tells Masumi of what Keigo really did. After a standoff between him and Yuki, Yuki shoots Keigo, wounding him. Masumi places Keigo under arrest, rendering his Investigation Diary useless. Keigo realizes he cannot kill a child and kills himself by destroying his Future Diary. Before dying, he apologizes to Yuki for betraying him and tells Minene to protect his family. Later on, Murumuru revealed that she had warned Keigo about his son's condition to "speed things up", with Deus noting that Fourth was a good candidate to be the last man standing.

Murumuru meets Keigo in a cafe where she tells him he has been chosen to receive a future diary. Keigo tells his backstory about why he became a detective and accepts the phone.

He appears in the alternate universe, being contacted by Minene about his son's cardiac illness, thus changing his future. He confronts the original Yuno when she prepares to murder her Third World counterpart and her family, and fires a bullet at her. Yuki and the Second World Murumuru appear, blocking the bullet, with Keigo silently witnessing the ending events of the survival game. Keigo is later seen two years on with his wife and son.

He alludes to the Roman god Mercury.

==== Reisuke Houjou ====
Voiced by: Asami Sanada (Japanese); Lindsay Seidel (English)

Reisuke Houjou (豊穣 礼佑, Hōjō Reisuke), the Fifth Diary user, is a five-year-old boy who is very intelligent for his age and a diabolical mind. He sometimes speaks in third person with his hand puppets whom he talks with. Reisuke's diary is the Hyper Vision Diary (はいぱーびじょんだいありー, Haipā Bijon Daiarī), a coloring book that gives a small summary of the activities that he may perform for the day. However, his diary only shows three entries for the day during the morning, noon, and night. Despite this limit, Reisuke has access to all three entries simultaneously, which allows him ample time to carefully plot his next move and be at the right place and time. Reisuke can also draw on his Future Diary, giving him some source material other than writing.

Reisuke's parents were members of the Omekata cult who both later committed mass suicide after the police raided their temple. However, Reisuke claims he never loved his parents since they neglected him, and wants to win the game to be a "Super Elite" to prove he does not need to depend on adults. But despite these claims, Minene learned Reisuke did love his parents and was devastated when they died. After his parents' death, Mrs. Amano takes care of Reisuke for a few days, as she was a friend of his father. He had grown a fondness to Mrs. Amano, even calling her, "Mama Rea". Due to the fact Yuki and Yuno were responsible for the incident that led to the police raid at the Omekata temple, Reisuke plans to kill them first, holding them responsible for his parents' deaths. However at the same time, he grows fond of them in a uniquely sadistic way, even calling them big brother and big sister.

Reisuke's first attempt at Yuno's life is when he is running around with scissors and slips on the rug. He lands into Yuno's chest, thinking he stabbed her, but she reveals that he stabbed a zabuton instead. After that, Reisuke planned to shower with Yuno by starting a bath, mixing it with salt, and grabbing electrical wires, in hopes to electrocute Yuno to death. With Yuki's Future Diary, he is able to stop Reisuke's plan by causing a power shortage in the house. Yuki and Yuno are on to Reisuke and try to stop him by taking away his Future Diary. Yuno planned to kill Reisuke with hammers but instead, hits Yuki's mom in the back of her neck and causes her to knock out. The day before, Reisuke went to the store with Yuki's mother and mailed his Future Diary to the house. When Yuki intercepts the package and opens it, Reisuke puts on a gas mask and poison gas fills the house. Yuno quickly grabs Yuki into the bathroom to save him. Reisuke has an antidote and tells Yuno to play hide-and-seek for it. With a handkerchief to cover her mouth from the poison, Yuno sets off to find Reisuke but runs into a few tricks and traps along the way. Successfully, Reisuke is able to fill the staircase with water and electrocute Yuno. As Reisuke is about to inject Yuno with poison, Yuki throws a dart at his arm. He and his diary was then stabbed by Yuno. Right before he died, he hands Yuno the antidote and reminds her that only one can win the game.

Murumuru hands Reisuke a diary after playing with him in a park.

As a result of the future change made by Yuki in the alternate universe, Tsubaki and the cult no longer become what they were, this in turn prevents the death of his parents and they become a happy family.

Hōjō means "fertility", linking him to Ceres.

==== Tsubaki Kasugano ====
Voiced by: Eri Sendai (Japanese); Kate Bristol (English)

Tsubaki Kasugano (春日野 椿, Kasugano Tsubaki) is the Sixth Diary user. A physically inept girl with bad eyesight, she is the leader of the Omekata cult (御目方教, Omekata Kyō) where she serves as the group's priestess. The scroll she carries is actually her Future Diary, the Clairvoyance Diary (千里眼日記, Senrigan Nikki) which allows her to read what her followers see. She fears traitors from within.

Tsubaki is introduced after Yuki, Yuno, and Keigo are invited to her cult's shrine, while in a cage, to help deal with a Diary user who is disguising himself as one of her followers and planning to kill her. In exchange for Yuki, who had avoided a Dead End twice so far, she wishes to surrender Minene to them (whom her cult had captured) in order to escape her own Dead End. Yuki agrees to help her due to her condition and Tsubaki's claim she has no interests in winning the game, much to Yuno's jealousy. When the Twelfth diary user Yomotsu takes action to kill Tsubaki by hypnotizing her followers, Yuki and Yuno protects her and kills Yomotsu. However, Tsubaki betrays everyone, revealing she was using Minene as bait to lure them so she could trap and kill them, and tells Yuki that she lied about not being interested in the game as she wants to win and end the world as she hates it.

Her parents who were the original leaders of the cult, a religion designed to save the weak and to never give in to wicked thoughts or acts. After her parents were killed in a car crash, Tsubaki became the priestess. However, the cult's second-in-command took over and had Tsubaki locked away in a cage, allowing the male members of the cult to rape her. The only thing keeping her sane was a handball given to her by her mother, which she eventually loses, causing her to become resentful and wish for the world to end as compensation for her suffering. After Yuno helps Yuki escape by cutting off Tsubaki's right hand, Yuki goes into hiding until Tsubaki orders him to show himself or her cult will rape Yuno. Yuki charges into the room where Tsubaki and Yuno are, and distracts everyone by throwing a ball, the ball Tsubaki lost, into the air. With her followers distracted by the ball and Tsubaki unable to close her scroll with one hand, Yuki successfully pierces her Future Diary with a dart. Before her death, Tsubaki cries it was unfair that her ball came back now when she needed it the most.

Murumuru hands Tsubaki a diary after mocking her blindness by making herself at home in Tsubaki's cell.

As Yuki changes the future of the Third World Yuno, this causes the future of the other participants to change as well. Before Tsubaki's parents going out for a drive, she tell them to wait as there's something going on in the city. As a result, the cult is able to find a bomb installed in the car of her parents and capture the second-in-command of the cult, thus preventing her from suffering the horrible life she had in the original world. Two years later, Tsubaki tries to capture Aru's affections.

In Future Diary: Paradox, Aru, who replaces Yuki as the First Diary user is ordered by Murumuru to reenacted the events above but instead, Aru refuses and does things differently by having Ai and Orin help him distract Murumuru and the Omekata cult so he can bring Tsubaki out of the cult's shrine. With Aru, Tsubaki learns from his investigations that her parents were actually murdered by the cult's second-in-command because her parents wanted to end the cult and give Tsubaki a normal life. Due to his kindness and him teaching her that despite what she had gone through, there was still some good in the world, Tsubaki falls in love with Aru.

Her actions are closest to Proserpina, including her imprisonment near Pluto and her sexual abuse.

Tsubaki is also likely inspired by Apollo, the god associated with the sun and prophecy. Tsubaki is the oracle of the Omekata cult, alleged to have clairvoyance. Adittionally, her name contains the kanji for sun (日).

==== Marco Ikusaba and Ai Mikami ====
Marco voiced by: Tomokazu Seki (Japanese), Brad Hawkins (English)
Ai voiced by: Natsuko Kuwatani (Japanese), Jamie Marchi (English)

Marco Ikusaba (戦場 マルコ, Ikusaba Maruko) and Ai Mikami (美神 愛, Mikami Ai) share the position of Seventh Diary user, originally assumed to be two separate Diary users. When first introduced, Marco and Ai were using apprentice diaries which were assumed by Yuki and his allies as their real Future Diaries with Marco's The Unbeatable Brawler Diary (常勝無敗ケンカ日記, Jōshō Muhai Kenka Nikki) predicting attacks before they happened, while Ai's Flirting Diary (逆ナン日記, Gyaku-nan Nikki) locates any man she wants to flirt in the future. Their real diaries are the Exchange Diaries (交換日記, Kōkan Nikki) which report each other's immediate future. The couple displays excellent teamwork as they use their diaries to cover each other's weaknesses. Their diary's weakness is that it reports what the other couple does in unspecified details. It leaves room for jealousy if the other is speaking with the opposite gender and reports what emotion and thought they have of the other.

When Ai was little, she was abandoned by her parents in the Sakurami Tower. There, she meets Marco and Kamado. As they grew older, Ai started following Marco around school. Marco got into a lot of fights while Ai kept a diary of Marco in her phone. Ai's classmates became annoyed and creeped by this so they put a letter in her locker saying it was Marco and to meet her in an abandoned factory. When she arrived, boys from her school put a bag over her head and raped her. Marco had a bad feeling about Ai when she did not pick up her phone and had a feeling she was at the abandoned factory. As Marco arrived, he sees Ai being violated and beats up then kills the boys. After, they promise to protect each other and kiss.

Ai appeared early in the series working undercover as member of the Omekata cult with her friend Orin Miyashiro to spy on Tsubaki. She returns later, this time with her boyfriend, Marco to eliminate the threat that of Yuki and Yuno. Marco and Ai are orphans who fell in love with each other after Ai was adopted by Kamado Ueshita, Marco's guardian. Their devotion is so strong that they want to win the game so they can become God and live for eternity together. Marco and Ai meet Yuki while passing by him in a car. They missed their chance to kill him but try again later when Yuki and his friends plan to cut off cellphone service so they cannot use their apprentice diaries. Yuno shows up and is about to ruin the plan until Yuki ties her up. Yuki and Yuno are cornered in the attic with Marco and Ai. Yuki's friends cut the telephone line thinking they have disabled the couple's apprentice phone until they take out their future diaries. Much to their surprise, Yuki unties Yuno as Ai throws knives at them. Yuno takes the knife that was used to cut the ropes and deflects Ai's knives with hers. Marco and Ai flee and burn down the house that was used as bait. As the house is burning, Marco and Ai re-enter the house to fight Yuki and Yuno. Yuno and Ai enter into battle. Yuno deflects Ai's knives once again and is about to stab Ai until Marco intervenes and gets stabbed in the shoulder. Marco enraged by Yuki's apparent lack of concern for Yuno, unaware she had previously kidnapped and drugged Yuki. Marco takes Yuki's and Yuno's future diaries and tells them to come to a tower with Yuki's father. Marco demands Yuki to fight him and rescue his dad and their future diaries but gets beat. During the fight, Yuki's father grabs his phone and breaks it, but it was a fake. Yuno attacks Ai and grabs their real phones back. Yuki's father does not understand that they are future diaries and was given a choice that if he broke Yuki's cellphone, his debt would be cleared by Bacchus. Marco explains why he did not break their phones is because, he likes to bully people he sees as "wusses". Ai is mortally wounded by Yuno as the tower collapses thanks to John Bacchus' intervention, Marco and Yuki working together to save Ai. Yuki's father runs off with Ai's parachute, leaving Yuki and Yuno on their own. Unwilling to live without Ai, Marco gives his single parachute to Yuki and Yuno to escape the tower, dying with Ai as the tower collapses.

Murumuru appears in Marco's and Ai's bed. Ai comes home and witnesses Murumuru in their bed and questions Marco as he comes out of the shower. Murumuru makes things up and causes trouble for the couple. She then hands them future diaries and the couple make up.

The two appear in the alternate universe, where Ai is seen pregnant after the survival game is averted.

Marco and Ai allude to the Roman gods Mars and Venus, respectively.

==== Kamado Ueshita ====
Voiced by: Hiromi Konno (Japanese); Monica Rial (English)

Kamado Ueshita (上下 かまど, Ueshita Kamado) is the Eighth Diary user. A large, strangely shaped woman, she is in charge of the "Mother's Home" orphanage where Marco, Ai and Orin were raised. Her diary, the Blog Diary (増殖日記, Zōshoku Nikki; "Propagation Diary"), is actually a server that can be accessed by the people she allows in, giving each person their own "Apprentice Diary" that can predict the future in their own various ways. Kamado has no interest in the Diary Game as the only thing she cares about looking after her orphans. Her orphans want her to win as they love Kamado and will kill anyone who harms her.

Kamado is the only diary owner who has no interest in becoming god, and is a pacifist. However, she forms a brief alliance with Yuki to capture John Bacchus. Yuki turns against her, Yuno killing all of her children, prompting Kamado to flee with Bacchus. The two join forces to twist the game, using a supercomputer, HOLON III, and Kamado's diary to give every phone owner in Sakurami City the power of the apprentice diaries. Kamado eventually abandons the scheme when Aru saves her from Yuno, saving Aru in return by giving him an apprentice diary to avoid being killed by Deus ex Machina and then Yuno. Kamado is protected by Yuki's friend only for them all to be gunned down by the despairing Yuki. Kamado is then stabbed shortly after by Yuno, but she asks Yuki to create a new world where children do not have to worry.

Murumuru visits the orphanage and tells Kamado she has been chosen as a future diary owner. As Kamado leaves to grab some tea, Murumuru questions how her body functions with that shape and size. As Kamado enters the room with tea, Murumuru trips her but she flips and lands on her knees without spilling the tea.

She appears on the alternate universe receiving a phone call from Bacchus who decides to give support to the orphanage after learning he will die in the survival game, and the two appear to pursue a relationship.

She alludes to the Roman goddess Vesta.

==== Karyuudo Tsukishima ====
Voiced by: Hirokazu Hiramatsu (Japanese); Mark Stoddard (English)

Karyuudo Tsukishima (月島 狩人, Tsukishima Karyūdo) is the Tenth Diary user. A rich man with elegant taste, Karyuudo is a dog breeder who loves and cares about his dogs so much that he neglects his family, to the point that his wife leaves him. His diary is the Breeder's Diary (飼育日記, Shiiku Nikki), which allows him to control his dogs to attack his enemies using his cellphone by voice command. However, it's the disadvantage is that the more dogs that user control, the greater concentration needed to command all of them which leaves the user vulnerable. Karyuudo manipulates his own daughter, Hinata, by telling her to attack Aru Akise, believing that Aru knew that Karyuudo was responsible for the recent savage murders. Also, that Aru was a Diary Holder, though he was mistaken on the latter. He pretends to form a closer kinship with his daughter to agree to this, though he was ultimately revealed to be using her. After his daughter fails to kill Aru, Karyuudo reveals his use for her and tells Hinata not to end up like her father before getting shot in the back of the head, he revealed that Keigo was his murderer to Hinata, Yuki, Yuno, and nearby friends.

Murumuru sneaks into Karyuudo's home and pretends to be a dog. After speaking with Karyuudo, she hands him a phone.

He appears in the alternate universe, with his future changed as Hinata takes a closer dedication to the dogs, this unites them and he no longer neglects his family.

He is named after the Roman goddess Diana, and his daughter takes on the role of Diana.

==== John Bacchus ====
Voiced by: Takaya Hashi (Japanese); Chris Smith (English)

John Bacchus (ジョン バックス, Jon Bakkusu) – Balks in the English dub – is the Eleventh Diary user and final one to be introduced. He is the Mayor of Sakurami City and is mastermind behind the Diary Game as he was the one who convince Deus to create the battle royal that will determine Deus' successor. Bacchus' diary is the Watcher Diary ("The Watcher" in the Japanese version) which enables him to read the other diary users entries including the Apprentice Diary users. The diary's powers can be countered if the user of the diary changes the information that comes up, before it is viewed on the Watcher Diary. A believer in Nazi ideology, Bacchus' main goal is to create a race of superior beings with him as their leader. Despite his ideology, he is a gentleman, befriending Kamado and inviting her to help him in his place to give everyone in Sakurami City the power of the Future Diaries.

He was Kurou Amano's employer who sent him to destroy Yuki's phone. After Kurou failed to accomplish his task, Bacchus has his men assassinate him. Yuki quickly vows revenge and launches an attack on Bacchus' forces located in a pair of identical business towers. Bacchus takes shelter in a bank vault, the bank once run by Yuno's parents. The only way to gain entry is through a retinal scanner which only he and the Gasai family can access, believing Yuno is unable to since Akise assumed she was an impersonator. Minene tries to blow apart the vault at the cost of her life, but fails. Yuno drags Yuki away, but returns, using the retinal scanner to enter the vault and kill Bacchus.

In the Third World created by Yuno, Bacchus' decision to create the Future Diaries is altered when he reads of his own death by observing Yuki's phone, cancelling out the survival game.

His surname directly refers to the Roman god Bacchus.

==== Yomotsu Hirasaka ====
Voiced by: Yoshihisa Kawahara (Japanese); Ian Sinclair (English)

Yomotsu Hirasaka (平坂 黄泉, Hirasaka Yomotsu) is the Twelfth Diary user. Blind and insane, he is a vigilante who acts like a tokusatsu hero (such as Kamen Rider and Super Sentai heroes) including wearing spandex and a large, round one eye mask. While claiming to be fighting for "Justice", his view of justice is very different as to him, justice is the one who wins. His tape recorder called the Justice Diary (正義日記, Seigi Nikki), has the ability to tell him what evil deeds that will happen in the future which range from normally criminal like plotting murder to the nonsensical like littering. Furthermore, his diary can hypnotize people by confusing them.

He captures the Ninth after her attack on the school, removing her damaged eye and presenting her to the Sixth's cult. He later stages an attack on Tsubaki and the other present Diary Holders by hypnotizing most of the cult to attack them while hiding in an underground base with the captured Minene. After the sprinklers are activated to stop the fire in the cage, all the cult members stop killing each other with Tsubaki's yelling. The Twelfth later uses a second wave of hypnotized followers and the followers that were pretending to be dead in the shrine. However, he is shocked to learn that Yuno Gasai figured out his plan and, upon hearing that his Dead End has been triggered, he swallows a bomb and attacks Tsubaki with four hypnotized followers dressed identically to him, aside from different colors on their masks in a suicide bombing. Yuno manages to discover which Twelfth is the real one by taking advantage of his blindness by pretending to throw a rock in one direction, but actually throwing it in the other, using his heightened hearing to her advantage. Yuno kills him by decapitating him and he praises her as victor before crashing out of sight and exploding. A running gag with him is his real face is never seen, at one point going as far as to wear two separate bags on his head so as to continue hiding it even after having it removed.

Murumuru hands Yomotsu a diary in exchange for 50 Yen.

He appears in the alternate universe and captures Takao Hiyama committing a crime. It can be guessed he continues his vigilante actions later on.

He alludes to the Roman god Pluto. His name is also a reference to the slope that descends into Yomi, the Japanese underworld.

==== Azami Kirisaki ====
Voiced by: Yū Asakawa

Azami Kirisaki (霧崎あざみ, Kirisaki Azami) is the Thirteenth Diary Owner, who appears exclusively in the PSP visual novel, Future Diary: The 13th Diary Owner (未来日記 -13人目の日記所有者-, Mirai Nikki: 13-nin-me no Nikki Shoyūsha). She is seen dressed in a high school uniform and a yellow raincoat. She seeks to kill Takao Hiyama after he attacked and hospitalised her younger twin sister Kasumi Kirisaki (霧崎 かすみ, Kirisaki Kasumi). She has the Video Diary (ビデオ日記, Bideo Nikki), a video camera which predicts what it will film before it films it.

=== Deities ===
==== Deus ex Machina ====
Voiced by: Norio Wakamoto (Japanese); Kent Williams (English)

Deus ex Machina (デウス エクス マキナ, Deusu Ekusu Makina) is the God of Time and Space and the Diary Game overseer and creator. Yuki had always assumed that Deus was just his imaginary friend, only to learn that he was in fact real. Convinced by John Bacchus' partnership, Deus created the Diary Game to find a worthy successor to take over his place. The reason he creates the game is because his life is coming to an end. Deus seems to favor Yuki and most likely wants him as his successor. He also favors on Minene, transferring his knowledge and half of his power to her and thus, making his death approaching faster than anticipated. He admits that she is the only one he can rely on at that point in time, to stop First World Murumuru. He even tells her that she is correct when Minene asked if Eleventh's diary is the ability to spy on other people's diaries, since Deus believed John to create a new futuristic race.

In the Third World, the future diary survival game never happens. Deus breaks the wall of space-time, connecting a path to 10,000 years later in the future of the Second World, allowing Yuki and the Third World Yuno to succeed after him as gods.

==== Murumuru ====
Voiced by: Manami Honda (Japanese); Leah Clark (English)

Murumuru (ムルムル, Murumuru) – spelled Mur Mur in the English dub – is a brown, white haired girl with a black point-tipped tail who is Deus' servant. She has an almost chibi-like appearance and is dressed rather provocatively, wearing a closed pink vest, panty-like shorts, large wide-brimmed stockings and a large open-topped nurse cap with valentine-hearts printed on each side. She has a rather playful and nonchalant attitude toward Deus and the other Diary users. Most of the time she serves as the comic relief of the series. She poses as a major antagonist towards the end of both the main series and Future Diary: Paradox, scheming behind Deus for her own personal fun. Like Yuno, Murumuru originates from the First World, having enjoyed the survival game so much that she performs a time leap with Yuno to the Second World, traps her alternate self in Yuno's illusions, and gives Yuno her second Future Diary. After Deus dies, Murumuru declares herself God until the second game is won, but the future of the Third World is altered through numerous catalysts. The Second World Murumuru escapes from Yuno's illusions with Yuki, beating down her First World self. Both Murumuru, along with her Third World self, reappear with Deus and Yuno in the Third World when Yuki and Yuno reunite.

She is named after Murmur, one of the 72 Goetic demons.

== Other characters ==
=== Friends ===
==== Masumi Nishijima ====
Voiced by: Makoto Ishii (Japanese); J. Michael Tatum (English)

Masumi Nishijima (西島 真澄, Nishijima Masumi) is the chief investigator and Keigo's subordinate within the police. He is an ally of Yuki within the police force. In Mirai Nikki: Mosaic, Masumi is interested in Minene, when the latter disguised herself as a police detective she killed. Even when he learns her real identity as a terrorist, Masumi still continues pursuing a relationship with Minene, much to the latter's confusion. After the incident where Keigo commits suicide, he entrusts Masumi his role of balancing out the other Diary users. Masumi was killed by the Eleventh's men by using himself as a shield of gun shots to protect Minene. In the Third World, Masumi and the Second World Minene is shown to be living happily with their children.

==== Ouji Kosaka ====
Voiced by: Minoru Shiraishi (Japanese); Joel McDonald (English)

Ouji Kosaka (高坂 王子, Kōsaka Ōji) is a classmate of Yuki's who used to bully him in the past but later became his friend during the Diary Game. He receives his "Kosaka King Diary" from the Eighth Diary user. This diary records any "triumphs" that Kosaka achieves in the future. Its usefulness is limited, however, as Kosaka views everything he does correctly as a great personal triumph, regardless of how small the task. Another serious shortcoming of his diary is that it only records when Kosaka will succeed, and therefore will not update if he is going to fail. He revealed the reason he bullies Yuki is because his 'crybaby face' reminds him of a stupid dog of his. Yuki gets mad and kills him with a pistol. In the Third World, he is seen with Karyuudo, Hinata and Mao.

==== Hinata Hino ====
Voiced by: Yuki Matsuoka (Japanese); Caitlin Glass (English)

Hinata Hino (日野 日向, Hino Hinata) is one of Yuki's new friends in his new school. Her father is actually Karyuudo Tsukishima, the Tenth Diary user. Although she initially attempted to kill Aru she did so under her father's promise (later revealed to be a lie) that they could be a family again. After her father's death, she helps Yuki whenever possible. She receives her "Friendship Diary" that predicts her friends' actions, from Eighth Diary user. In the Second World, she is killed by Yuki after a failed attempt to convince Yuki the fact that the resurrection of his parents would be impossible even if he were to become god. In the Third World, she is seen with her father and friends.

==== Mao Nonosaka ====
Voiced by: Yukana (Japanese); Ashleigh Domangue, Jill Harris (Redial) (English)

Mao Nonosaka (野々坂 まお, Nonosaka Mao) is one of Yuki's new friends in his new school. She is a quiet, polite girl who is constantly photographing the things around her, though her photos mainly center on Hinata. She is in love with Hinata and would do anything for her. She received her "Hinata Love-Love Diary", which allows her to predict Hinata's future similarly to the way Yuno predicts Yuki's, from the Eighth Diary user. In the Second World, she is killed by Yuki after calling him a coward. In the Third World, she is seen with Aru, Kosaka and Hinata.

=== Amano family ===
==== Rea Amano ====
Voiced by: Kaoru Mizuhara (Japanese); Colleen Clinkenbeard (English)

Rea Amano (天野 礼亜, Amano Rea) is Yuki's mother who is rarely at home because of her work as a video game programmer. Despite this, she has a very casual and close relationship with her son and even approved Yuno as his girlfriend. However, Rea is oblivious of her son's involvement in the Diary Game and Yuno's true nature. Prior to the series, she divorced her husband, Kurou, for gaining a large debt. She later confronts her ex-husband and is killed by him, unintentionally, when he stabs her for dragging him back to the Sakurami Tower. In the alternative universe, she is seen alive along with her husband, Third World Yuki, and Yuki's new girlfriend Moe Wakaba.

She is named after Rhea, the mother of Jupiter's Greek equivalent, Zeus.

==== Kurou Amano ====
Voiced by: Takehito Koyasu (Japanese); Eric Vale (English)

Kurou Amano (天野 九郎, Amano Kurō) is Yuki's father, who is divorced from his wife for gaining a large debt. He appears later trying to reconcile with Yuki and their family. However, this is a facade as Kurou is secretly working under John Bacchus to destroy Yuki's diary without knowing it will kill Yuki, in exchange of having his debts paid. But his plans are foiled by Marco and Ai, forcing him to escape only to encounter his ex-wife whom he accidentally kills. Kurou starts to feel guilt and a desire to make up to his son for what he has done. When he is at a shrine with his son, he is stabbed in the abdomen by Bacchus' men.

He is named after Cronus, the father of Jupiter's Greek equivalent, Zeus.

=== Gasai family ===
==== Saika Gasai ====
Voiced by: Kikuko Inoue (Japanese); Anastasia Muñoz (English)

Saika Gasai (我妻 西果, Gasai Saika) is Yuno's adoptive mother. Though dead throughout the majority of the storyline, she is shown in the past to have abused and locked Yuno in a cage, and vents her frustrations on her, claiming she is a bad daughter. Saika's abuse of Yuno is apparently fueled by her own insecurities and self-hatred. In the alternative universe, when the First World Yuno tried to assassinate her Third World self, Saika defends her, and her viewpoint towards her daughter changes for the better.

==== Ushio Gasai ====
Voiced by: Eiji Miyashita (Japanese); Christopher Sabat (English)

Ushio Gasai (我妻潮, Gasai Ushio) is Yuno's adoptive father. He is known to run the Sakurami City bank that Bacchus uses as a shelter during the invasion where Yuki and Yuno attempt to assassinate Bacchus to win the Survival Game. Unlike Saika, Ushio was never directly abusive towards Yuno, but he intentionally worked longer hours as a means of avoiding Saika due to her ever-increasing emotional instability. Because he was not around, Saika's abuse of Yuno continued unchecked. In the alternative universe, Ushio shown to be a much more caring man to his daughter.

=== Minor ===
==== Orin Miyashiro ====
Voiced by: Etsuko Kozakura (Japanese); Jad Saxton (English)

Orin Miyashiro (宮代 お鈴, Miyashiro Orin) is a member of Tsubaki's cult and a personal friend of Ai. After the Omekata cult incident, she is seen as an assistant to Kamado. Her diary is the "Orphanage Diary", which predicts Kamado's orphans' actions. She speaks with a polite, yet sarcastic tone. Orin's head is sliced off by Yuno as part of the plan to kill off Kamado. In the Third World, she is seen with Tarou.

==== Tarou Nanba ====
Voiced by: Naomi Shindō (Japanese); Scott Freeman (English)

Tarou Nanba (難波 太郎, Nanba Tarō), nicknamed Taa-kun (たー君, Tā-kun), is one of the orphans Kamado took care of. He is very determined to make sure she succeeds in the survival game, feeling she is the only person who can make a better world for the orphans. His diary is the "Copy Diary" and can mirror the abilities of other diaries. He is very strict with Ai and Marco to the point that both dislike his attitude and think he is annoying. He is killed by Yuno, moments after realizing he was only used as a pawn. In the Third World, he is seen with Orin.

==== Funatsu ====
Voiced by: Eiji Maruyama (Japanese); Kenny Green (English)

Funatsu (船津, Funatsu) is the second-in-command of Tsubaki's cult. He is responsible for her parents' death as well as the constant raping she suffers at the hands of the cult members, not wanting the cult to disband, according to her parents' decision, and took over leadership. In the alternate universe, he is caught trying to insert a makeshift bomb within Tsubaki's parents' car, changing the future of the cult and Reisuke's family.

==== Ryuji Kurosaki ====
Voiced by: Tetsu Inada (Japanese); Chris Cason (English)

Ryuji Kurosaki (黒崎 竜司, Kurosaki Ryūji) is the secretary of Sakurami City. His diary is the "Secretary Diary", which records all of the Mayor's actions. He is killed by Bacchus for becoming a security risk when it is revealed that he will in the future be captured and give up the passwords for the vault in which they are taking shelter. In the anime, Ryuji is tortured and killed by Minene instead.

==== Moe Wakaba ====
Voiced by: Mutsumi Tamura (Japanese); Alexis Tipton (English)

Moe Wakaba (若葉 萌絵, Wakaba Moe) is Yukiteru Amano and Yuno Gasai's classmate one year prior to the events of the series. Yukiteru had a crush on her but she turns him down after he gives her a love letter, much to Yuno's relief. Moe reappears in the Third World, after Yuno traps Yuki in an illusion world in which Yuno does not exist, and Yuki can have anything he wants, and Moe is the girl Yuki wants, but Yuki denies her (while, in the anime, she even undresses to seduce him). After the Survival Game concludes, the Moe of the Third World is in a romantic relationship with the Yukiteru of the Third World, as such both are seen holding hands and smiling at one another.
