= Big Order =

Japanese manga series by Sakae Esuno

- Cover of Big Order volume one.

ビッグオーダー (Biggu Ōdā)
- Genre: Supernatural
- Manga
- Written by: Sakae Esuno
- Published by: Kadokawa Shoten
- English publisher: NA: Yen Press
- Magazine: Shōnen Ace
- Original run: September 26, 2011 – August 26, 2016
- Volumes: 10
- Original video animation
- Directed by: Nobuharu Kamanaka
- Written by: Katsuhiko Takayama
- Music by: Evan Call
- Studio: Asread
- Released: October 3, 2015
- Runtime: 23 minutes
- Anime television series
- Directed by: Nobuharu Kamanaka
- Written by: Katsuhiko Takayama
- Music by: Evan Call
- Studio: Asread
- Licensed by: NA: Crunchyroll (streaming) Discotek Media (home video)
- Original network: Tokyo MX, KBS, BS11, Chiba TV, tvk, TVS, SUN, RKK, TVQ, GBS, MTV
- English network: SEA: Aniplus Asia
- Original run: April 16, 2016 – June 18, 2016
- Episodes: 10
- icon

Big Order (ビッグオーダー, Biggu Ōdā) is a Japanese manga series written and illustrated by Sakae Esuno. It was serialized in Kadokawa Shoten's Shōnen Ace magazine between the November 2011 and September 2016 issues. The manga is licensed in North America by Yen Press. An original video animation episode by Asread was released on October 3, 2015. A 10-episode anime television series adaptation aired in Japan between April and June 2016.

== Plot ==
Order users are people who have gained special abilities called Orders, which can also give them the power to grant their wishes. Eiji Hoshimiya believes he is responsible for the Great Destruction that happened exactly ten years ago because of his wish, which is why he refuses to use his power. When the transfer student Rin Kurenai makes a move against him and kidnaps his sister, Eiji's life as an Order user begins and he finds out the truth.

== Characters ==
=== Main characters ===
Eiji Hoshimiya (星宮エイジ, Hoshimiya Eiji)
Voiced by: Masakazu Morita
At first, he believes that when he was a kid, what he wished for when he was approached by Daisy was the destruction of the world, but, after being targeted to be assassinated by Rin, he remembers that what he wished for was world domination. Due to his wish, he gains the Bind Dominator Order, which allows him to control anything, living and non-living, as long as they are in his domain, that is, places he has placed the Order's 'anchor' and 'wire' on. He places Rin under his control after he and his sister were about to be killed by her and orders her to be his companion. He also becomes the leader of the infamous organization, "Dazaifu Government Organization" that seeks to create an independent country by declaring war on other countries. Eiji decides to rule this organization to create a world where his sister, Sena would be safe. He falls in love with Rin at first sight and spares her life when she tries to assassinate him.
In the end, his beliefs, first that his wish was to destroy the world, then that he actually wished to rule it (due to his inspiration of a favorite supervillain), were all wrong nor was Bind Dominator his power. His true power is "Illegal Digger", which allows him to steal the power and memories from another. His wish was "to take Sena's fault", which thus tampered with his memories in the process.
Rin Kurenai (紅鈴, Kurenai Rin)
Voiced by: Shiori Mikami
A transfer student in Eiji's class. Rin is targeting Eiji due to the Great Destruction 10 years ago that killed her parents in a fire. Her Order is healing ability - she can heal herself as well as other people and things. She slowly develops feelings for him, and they progress further after learning the truth. Once a temporary member of the UN Dept of Public Safety due to Gennai's control over her but more loyal to Sena. Now she works with Eiji, determined to kill Sena for causing the First Great Destruction.
Sena Hoshimiya (星宮瀬奈, Hoshimiya Sena)
Voiced by: Misaki Kuno
Eiji's younger stepsister. She is hospitalized due to an undefined illness. Revealed to be the one who caused the Great Destruction by her wish: Me, Mama, Papa, and Eiji to be together forever. Bind Dominator was originally hers, but Eiji's ability, Illegal Digger, stole both her powers and memories of the incident. Was used as the key to open the Gate, but after it failed, she was believed to be dead. However, she's revealed to be alive and creating more Orders instead of Daisy.

=== Dazaifu's Group of Ten ===
The members are ordered from First Hand to Tenth Hand. The goal was using Eiji as a puppet leader to make Japan an independent state again by declaring wars. However, their true goal was preventing Gennai from evoking another Great Destruction. After preventing the Second Great Destruction, they decided to slowly disband.
Raidō Fuwa (不破 雷同, Fuwa Raidō)
Voiced by: Mitsuru Miyamoto
The First Hand. His ability is to stop any act of combat/war, including stopping grenades from exploding.
Benkei Narukami (鳴神弁慶, Narukami Benkei)
Voiced by: Fumihiko Tachiki
The Second Hand. An honorable ninja warrior. His ability, "Battle-On: Aramitama" is to pulverize anything at an atomic level, including nuclear missiles.
Yoshitsune Hiiragi (柊義経, Hīragi Yoshitsune)
Voiced by: Shinnosuke Tachibana
The Third Hand. A Lt. Colonel who is the acting leader of the Group of Ten and has a bird creature on his shoulder. Appears to be deceitful and calculating with his own agenda, especially with Eiji. His wish was "to deny the world", which resulted in his ability: "Fact to Fiction": the ability to call the truth bull - in other words, a reality warping ability with limited range that undoes events by calling them fiction and bestow events by calling them facts. Currently missing after the failed Second Destruction.
Iyo (壱与)
Voiced by: Azusa Tadokoro
The Fourth Hand. A girl whose Order is seeing the future. She is also the one who 'found' Eiji. Anyone who touches her ribbon, that acts like rabbit ears/antennas, will cause her to rapidly become pregnant and soon give birth, which will result in the loss of her powers, although the baby will disappear from her womb after a while if not given birth to. She eventually has romantic feelings for Eiji and becomes a love rival with Rin. Her ability is "Star Seeker": the power of Divination. She once combined her ability with Eiji's ability. Originally known as "Subject #23" of the Hoshimiya Agency.
Taikei Nehara (根原 大系, Nehara Taikei)
Voiced by: Hirokazu Hiramatsu
The Fifth Hand. A tall member who is considered the trump card of the Group of Ten. His ability is called "Apoptosis Bomb", which allows him to offer his life to destroy a target with absolute certainty (it can only be used once). His wish was to "save everyone and everything." He used his ability to prevent the Second Destruction when the gate opened - limiting it to just the destruction of Nara.
Lauryn Wright (ローリン・ライト, Rōrin Raito)
Voiced by: Makoto Ishii
The Sixth Hand. A young man whose ability is called "Skyfish Free", which gives him the ability of flight, also possibly extended to other people and may possess super strength, as he helped stop the rock god's fist with Benkei. His wish was "flying in the sky".
Kokudo Soumoku (草木 国土, Sōmoku Kokudo)
Voiced by: Norio Wakamoto
The Seventh Hand.
Nene Minamoto (源 寧々, Minamoto Nene)
Voiced by: Aya Uchida
The Eighth Hand. A small young girl. Her Order involves possessing people through their dreams. As long as a person is sleeping she can find them and control their body.
Mari Kunou (久能マリ, Kunō Mari)
Voiced by: Saori Hayami
The Ninth Hand. The most mature female and an acting coordinator. Her ability is "Curve Ray", the ability to manipulate light - can also be used to create lasers, optical camouflage, view distant objects, etc. Her wish was to "see the light", due to her poor eyesight.
Ayahito Sundan (寸断殺人, Sundan Ayahito)
Voiced by: Yū Hayashi
The Tenth Hand. Apparently appears to be a psycho who was "subject #1" of the Hoshimiya Agency. Views Eiji as a god as the first Great Destruction granted him his freedom. His ability appears to be a dimensional warp gate that involves zippers. He is currently missing after the Second Great Destruction.

=== Others ===
Daisy
Voiced by: Mari Misaki
The one who grants wishes and Orders to people. She decides to stick with Eiji due to her fascination with his power. Later revealed to be a program that can interact with people's desires and make them come true, also acting as a communication system for long-distance orders. States that Gennai is her "father" as he created her.
Gennai Hoshimiya (星宮源内, Hoshimiya Gennai)
Voiced by: Satoshi Tsuruoka
Eiji's father and Sena's stepfather, who was thought to be dead during the Great Destruction, but it is revealed by both Daisy and Hiiragi that he is alive and the one who created Daisy. Originally the Director of the Hoshimiya Agency, whose goal was to convert human thoughts into energy, and now acting Vice-Director of the UN Dept of Public Safety. His goal was to sacrifice Sena to open a Gate that will unlock a new world that can make everyone's wish come true - but doing so will create another Great Destruction. His ability is called "Mind Set", which allows him to control people within his 2 meter territory, but still have control over them when they leave his territory (proof of this is that the people have a star-like pupil in their right eye, just like Daisy's). His wish was for the "bliss and harmony of everyone". He was shot protecting Sena from Hiiragi, and said that he was a fool but wanted to see his experiment unfold.
Kagekiyo Tairano (平景清, Tairano Kagekiyo)
Voiced by: Hitomi Harada
Is a woman who once was an adversary of Eiji and his group, she fights with a hammer and has control over a rock golem. Her Order allows her to petrify her enemies. After she is defeated, she joins up with them. She creates a strong bond with Rin, due to the fact that they both hate Eiji.
Abraham Louis Fran (アブラアン・ルイ・フラン, Aburaan Rui Furan)
Voiced by: Tarusuke Shingaki
A subordinate under the Group of Ten. His ability is "Time Stop": the ability to stop time on a maximum of three targets, such as Sena to stop the progress of her disease. Later during the UN's secret police invasion, it is revealed he is under Gennai's control and takes Sena.

== Media ==
=== Manga ===
Big Order is written and illustrated by Sakae Esuno. It was serialized in Kadokawa Shoten's Shōnen Ace magazine between the November 2011 and September 2016 issues. Kadokawa Shoten published 10 tankōbon volumes released between December 21, 2011, and September 26, 2016. North American publisher Yen Press announced their license to the series at Anime Expo 2016.

| No. | Original release date | Original ISBN | English release date | English ISBN |
|---|---|---|---|---|
| 1 | December 21, 2011 | 978-4-04-120091-9 | January 31, 2017 | 978-0-31-643584-0 |
| 2 | June 21, 2012 | 978-4-04-120246-3 | January 31, 2017 | 978-0-31-643590-1 |
| 3 | December 21, 2012 | 978-4-04-120522-8 | May 23, 2017 | 978-0-31-643592-5 |
| 4 | July 23, 2013 | 978-4-04-120779-6 | May 23, 2017 | 978-0-31-643594-9 |
| 5 | February 26, 2014 | 978-4-04-121011-6 | September 19, 2017 | 978-0-31-643596-3 |
| 6 | August 26, 2014 | 978-4-04-102016-6 | September 19, 2017 | 978-0-31-643598-7 |
| 7 | February 26, 2015 | 978-4-04-102785-1 | February 6, 2018 | 978-0-31-643601-4 |
| 8 | October 26, 2015 | 978-4-04-102871-1 | February 6, 2018 | 978-0-31-643603-8 |
| 9 | March 26, 2016 | 978-4-04-104098-0 | June 26, 2018 | 978-1-97-535419-0 |
| 10 | September 26, 2016 | 978-4-04-104793-4 | June 26, 2018 | 978-1-97-535421-3 |

=== Anime ===
An original video animation (OVA) episode, produced by Asread and directed by Nobuharu Kamanaka, was released on October 3, 2015, with the limited edition of the eighth manga volume. The same staff that produced the OVA returned to produce a 10-episode anime television series adaptation, which aired in Japan between April 16 and June 18, 2016. Crunchyroll planned to release the series on Blu-ray and DVD with an English dub by Funimation, however both releases ended up being cancelled and Funimation only offered a sub-only version through electronic sell-through in 2018. Discotek Media released the series sub-only on Blu-ray on November 24, 2020. The OVA was also released alongside it.

The OVA's theme song is "Geki" (檄) by Yōsei Teikoku. For the anime series, the opening theme is "Disorder" by Yōsei Teikoku, and the ending theme is "Kobore Sekai Oware" (毀レ世カイ終ワレ) by Aki Hata.

| No. | Title | Directed by | Animation director | Original release date |
|---|---|---|---|---|
| 1 | "Order! Awaken, Evil Powers!" "Ōdā! Mezamero, Aku no Chikara! Big destruction" (Japanese: オーダー！目覚めろ、悪の力！ BIG destruction) | Nobuharu Kamanaka | Maiko Okada, Chika Kojima, Kanako Watanabe | April 16, 2016 |
| 2 | "Order! Run, Don't Hesitate! Big Examination" "Ōdā! Hashire, Mayou na! Big examination" (Japanese: オーダー！走れ、迷うな！ BIG examination) | Hideki Hiroshima | Kanako Watanabe | April 23, 2016 |
| 3 | "Order! Execute Strategies!" "Ōdā! Keiryaku Suikō! Big strategy" (Japanese: オーダー！計略遂行！ BIG strategy) | Ryōki Kamitsubo | Takeshi Yoshioka, Hiroki Takagi, Seiji Kishimoto, Masaru Katō, Shinichi Yamaoka | April 30, 2016 |
| 4 | "Order! Amidst Resentment!" "Ōdā! Ensa no Naka e! Big grudge" (Japanese: オーダー！ 怨嗟の中へ！ BIG grudge) | Naoyuki Kuzuya | Zenzai Yamamoto | May 7, 2016 |
| 5 | "Order! Don't Forget Your Wish!" "Ōdā! Wasureruna, Negai! Big betrayal" (Japanese: オーダー！ 忘れるな、願い！ BIG betrayal) | Takashi Yamamoto | Atsuko Takahashi, Tatsusen Inazu | May 14, 2016 |
| 6 | "Order! Merge, Souls!" "Ōdā! Tsunage, Tamashī!! Big connect" (Japanese: オーダー！ つなげ、魂！！ BIG connect) | Katsuhiko Bizen | Keiko Watanabe, Shōtaira Hamaguchi, Minami Takemura, Erina Oshima, Mirai Nagao, Hitomi Aso | May 21, 2016 |
| 7 | "Order! Protect Your Beliefs!" "Ōdā! Mamore, Shinnen! Big belief" (Japanese: オーダー！ 守れ、信念！ BIG belief) | Unknown | TBA | May 28, 2016 |
| 8 | "Order! Hurry to the Battlefield!" "Ōdā! Isoge, Senchi e! Big battle" (Japanese: オーダー！ 急げ、戦地へ！ BIG battle) | Unknown | TBA | June 4, 2016 |
| 9 | "Order! Uncover the Truth!" "Ōdā! Abake, Shinjitsu! Big revelation" (Japanese: オーダー！ 暴け、真実！ BIG revelation) | Unknown | TBA | June 11, 2016 |
| 10 | "Order! Fight and Believe in Yourself!" "Ōdā! Tatakae, Onore o Shinjite! Big distortion" (Japanese: オーダー！ 戦え、己を信じて！ BIG distortion) | Unknown | TBA | June 18, 2016 |

== Reception ==
David West of Neo gave the anime a 1 out of 5 stars, criticizing the story, production values, and the main character Eiji as well as his relationship with Sena, which he found to be troubling. He also criticized the plot, noticing that most of the violence was without consequence.
