= Yuno Gasai =

Fictional character in the manga series Future Diary

- Future Diary character
- Yuno Gasai as she appears in the first manga cover
- First appearance: Future Diary chapter 1: "Future Diary" (未来日記, Mirai Nikki) (2006)
- Created by: Sakae Esuno
- Portrayed by: Ayame Goriki
- Voiced by: Tomosa Murata (Japanese); Brina Palencia (English)

In-universe information
- Full name: Yuno Gasai
- Aliases: Second Diary Holder; Second
- Species: Human (former); Goddess (current)
- Gender: Female
- Relatives: Ushio Gasai (adoptive father); Saika Gasai (adoptive mother)
- Nationality: Japanese

Yuno Gasai (Japanese: 我妻 由乃, Hepburn: Gasai Yuno) is a fictional character and the main female protagonist and antagonist of the manga series Future Diary, created by Sakae Esuno. In the series, she pretends to be a perfect model student on the surface, but is actually a yandere who is obsessed with the main male protagonist Yukiteru Amano, and kills unhesitatingly to protect him.

Both she and Yuki are chosen by Deus Ex Machina, the God of Time and Space, as participants of the Diary Game, a deadly battle royal between them and ten other individuals who are given Future Diaries, special diaries that can predict the future, with the last survivor becoming Deus' heir. As the Second Diary Holder, Yuno's Future Diary is the Yukiteru Diary (雪輝日記, Yukiteru Nikki), a stalker diary that gives her explicit details on whatever Yuki is doing in the present 10 minutes. By working together with his Random Diary, they are able to solve their diaries' weaknesses.

In the anime adaptation, Yuno is voiced by Tomosa Murata in Japanese, and by Brina Palencia in the English version. In the live-action adaptation, Ayame Goriki portrays a different, reimagined version of Yuno.

== Concept and creation ==
=== Development ===
Yuno is named after Juno, the ancient Roman goddess of love and marriage. In 2009, during an interview, Sakae Esuno, the author of Future Diary, revealed that he chose to make Yuno a yandere character so that it would be more difficult for her and Yuki to work together as a team, saying that Yuno is one of the problems he would eventually have to face. In another interview, Esuno stated that Yuno is a character whose development of some facets and elements of her past would explain how she conditioned her current psychotic self. Esuno was also questioned if Yuno, who is "ready to sacrifice everything out of love for the hero [Yuki]", was his type of an ideal girl and he simply answered no, saying that "meeting such a girl in reality would still be scary".

=== Characterization ===
Yuno is a young girl with pink eyes and long pink hair styled in pigtails, two hanging as frontal locks featuring a pair of red bows, and the back pigtails left bare. Her most common attire consists of a blue shirt with a ribbon on her chest accompanied by a blue skirt with high socks, although her wardrobe changes occasionally throughout the series. Yuno's personality is ambiguous. For the most part she is a sweet, feminine, and sometimes shy girl when around Yuki. But, this masks her dark and sanguinary side — a ruthless, cold and calculating psychopath who has little, if any, problem in using others for her ends: her and Yuki's survival. She will resort to cruel and usually violent methods, most of the time coming out of nowhere, that generally end in bloody deaths, of either the Diary Holder or any respective follower, effectively making her a yandere.

Yuno possesses divine powers from winning the first Diary Game. An example of such powers is moving enormous structures through her will alone, such as when she tried to crush Yuki. In addition to intelligence and cunning, perhaps her most fearsome ability is demonstrating proficiency with different types of weaponry. These include knives, axes, swords, pistols, and submachine guns. She is also fairly knowledgeable of poisons and drugs, although she rarely uses them. She has also demonstrated to be quite skilled in infiltration, as she has on more than one occasion entered a building unnoticed even while it was surrounded by the police.

== Appearances ==
=== In Future Diary ===
Screenshot from the first episode of the anime, with Yuno making her iconic "Yandere Face"

In the past, Yuno is abandoned in an orphanage as a baby and later adopted by Ushio and Saika, both coming from bankers' families. The first years of Yuno's life were as happy and carefree as those of any girl of her age, until her parents started having serious money problems. They begin to abuse Yuno, locking her up in a cage and timing everything she does, from sleeping to eating. Unable to endure the abuse, Yuno takes advantage of a distraction from her parents to escape and lock them in the same cage in which she was locked. However, Yuno unconsciously neglects her parents and they starve to death. She hides them under the pretext that they are working overseas. A year prior to the events of the series, Yuno becomes obsessively in love with classmate Yukiteru "Yuki" Amano, due to a promise he made to her to go stargazing together. With nothing else to live for, Yuno decides to dedicate her entire life to Yuki, stalking him everywhere and recording everything he does in a diary on her cell phone.

At the start of the series, both Yuno and Yuki are chosen by Deus Ex Machina, the God of Time and Space, to be participants of the Diary Game, a battle royal whose winner will succeed Deus and inherit his powers. As the Second Diary Holder, Yuno allies herself with Yuki (the First Diary Holder) to kill the remaining ten Diary Holders. Together, they use Yuno's Yukiteru Diary, which details Yuki's actions in ten-minute intervals, in conjunction with Yuki's Random Diary, which gives details of what happens around his surroundings but nothing about him, in order to overcome their own diaries' weaknesses. After killing most of the opposing Diary Holders with Yuno, Yuki discovers the corpses of Yuno's parents, as well as a third corpse, within a quarter of her home and learns through Aru Akise, an artificial human created by Deus to witness the events of the Diary Game, that the third corpse belongs to the real Yuno of this timeline and the Yuno he currently knows and interacts with originates from another timeline in which she won the Diary Game by pretending to commit double-suicide with the Yuki of that timeline as the end of the world came closer, but discovered not even the power of a god could resurrect the dead. In her sorrow, Yuno went back in time, creating a Second World in the process, and killed and replaced her other self.

Exposed in the end, Yuno uses her powers to return to the past again, creating a Third World, in order to relive everything again. Yuki and Minene Uryū, the Ninth Diary Holder, follow her to change all their terrible futures, including Yuno's to prevent the Diary Game from happening. Thinking she is just using Yuki, she tries to rid herself of him by sealing him in an utopia of illusions, but he breaks free using his love and force. Realizing that she really loves Yuki, Yuno commits suicide to let him win the Diary Game, allowing him to become the God of Time and Space of the Second World. Third World Yuno is able to find happiness with her parents, and subsequently receives the memories of First World Yuno from Murumuru. As Yuno gains the memories of her other self, she is chosen by Third World Deus to be his successor as Goddess of the Third World. She then uses her newly given divine powers to create a pathway to the Second World and finally reunite with Yuki as they prepare to fulfill their promise of stargazing together.

=== In other media ===
In the live-action drama titled Future Diary: Another:World, Ayame Goriki plays Yuno Furusaki, a reimagined version of Yuno Gasai. Like Gasai, the live-action Yuno is one of the Future Diary Holders, and she has a one-sided, stalker-like crush on male protagonist Arata Hoshino (a character based on Yuki Amano). Yuno's Future Diary is the A-kun Diary (新太君日記, Arata-kun Nikki), which works like Gasai's Yukiteru Diary, as it allows Yuno to predict everything about Arata, but nothing about herself unless it is related to Arata. Unlike her manga/anime counterpart, Yuno seems to be more mentally stable, as she has not shown any psychopathic tendencies and seems to be more supportive and friendly to Arata. Despite this, some aspects of Yuno's personality resemble Gasai's, as she goes to great lengths to ensure Arata's safety and also becomes increasingly possessive of Arata, to the point of claiming that she is the only one he can trust.

Yuno also appears in the visual novel based on the manga titled Future Diary: The 13th Diary Owner.

== Reception ==
=== Popularity ===
Yuno Gasai has become an extremely popular and somewhat of a breakout character in anime and manga fandom. She had been credited for popularizing the yandere character archetype. She has also become a popular subject of cosplay, causing a trend in Japan where women attempted to replicate her iconic look. In a 2013 poll by BIGLOBE, Yuno was voted to be the most popular yandere character. In June 2020, Yuno was ranked as the 6th Best Yandere Character in Anime by Comic Book Resources. In November 2020, Yuno was elected the 8th Best & Hottest Yandere Girl In Anime by OtakuKart. The facial expression Yuno makes at the end of the first episode of Future Diary has become a popular meme on internet known as "Yandere Face", and has since been used by fans to associate yandere characters, with several netizens editing Yuno's face to make it look like other characters from various anime/manga series.

=== Critical response ===
In a review for Future Diary, a writer identified as "7mononoke" commented about the "fascinating and toxic" psyche of Yuno, noting how she has shown symptoms of various mental and personality disorders throughout the series, including dissociative identity disorder, borderline personality disorder and antisocial personality disorder. 7mononoke also points out that Yuno "isn't only memorable as the crazy yandere; she is so much more". THEM Anime Reviews described Yuno as being a "standard anime archetype" (yandere), but complimented her development throughout the series, saying that, by the end of Future Diary, she has become a character "worth caring about". Reviewing Future Diary, Jacob Chapman of Anime News Network criticized Yuno as being a "slavering yandere". The Artifice highlighted the depiction of Yuno and how she jumps back and forth from "just your average adorable middle schooler" to a "raging, calculated, cold-blooded killer".

Sean Cubillas of Comic Book Resources called Yuno the "poster child" for the Future Diary series, in addition to stating, "Yuno Gasai is possibly the most famous yandere character of all time. Whether that's because of her iconic look or the fact that she always keeps the plot unpredictable, Yuno is definitely the spice that keeps the show interesting. Yuno can either be the competent protector for Yuki that handles issues with a cool head or just a pure villain that has fans screaming at their TV. She's a truly terrifying force that never fails to stick to people's imaginations, and she's carried this series the same way that she carries Yuki." Ritwik Mitra of Screen Rant said Yuno is "easily the most entertaining aspect of the entire series".

== See also ==
- List of Future Diary characters
