= Yandere =

Fictional Character

Cosplayer as Yuno Gasai, a character who is violently protective of her love interest. She has been credited for popularizing this character archetype.

A yandere (ヤンデレ; pronounced [jaɰ̃deɾe]) is a type of character in anime and manga characterised by being affectionate to the point of being either possessive or obsessive. The term is a portmanteau of the words yanderu (病んでる), meaning (mentally or emotionally) ill, and deredere (でれでれ, "lovey dovey"), meaning to show genuinely strong romantic affection. Yandere characters are often willing to go to extreme lengths to be with their lover, and have been said to be reminiscent of people with borderline personality disorder.

== See also ==
- Obsessive love
- Lovesickness
- Tsundere
- Kuudere
- Menhera
- Yandere Simulator, an upcoming stealth action video game
