= Future Diary =

Japanese manga series and its franchise

- Cover of Future Diary volume 1 featuring Yukiteru Amano and Yuno Gasai

未来日記 (Mirai Nikki)
- Genre: Mystery; Psychological thriller; Romance
- Manga
- Written by: Sakae Esuno
- Published by: Kadokawa Shoten
- English publisher: NA: Tokyopop (former); Viz Media
- Magazine: Monthly Shōnen Ace
- Original run: January 26, 2006 – December 25, 2010
- Volumes: 12
- Manga

Future Diary: Mosaic/Paradox/Redial
- Written by: Sakae Esuno
- Published by: Kadokawa Shoten
- Magazine: Monthly Shōnen Ace
- Original run: November 26, 2008 – July 26, 2013
- Volumes: 3
- Anime television series
- Directed by: Naoto Hosoda
- Written by: Katsuhiko Takayama
- Music by: Tatsuya Kato
- Studio: Asread
- Licensed by: Crunchyroll (Note: In North America through Crunchyroll, LLC (formerly known as Funimation) and in Australia through Crunchyroll Store Australia (formerly known as Madman Entertainment).); UK: Kazé UK (former); Anime Limited
- Original network: Chiba TV; TV Saitama
- Original run: October 10, 2011 – April 16, 2012
- Episodes: 26 + OVA
- Television drama

Future Diary: Another:World
- Directed by: Michiko Namiki; Shogo Miyaki
- Produced by: Ryota Fujino
- Written by: Sayaka Kuwamura; Kaeko Hayafune
- Music by: Shuichiro Fukuhiro
- Original network: Fuji TV
- Original run: April 21, 2012 – June 30, 2012
- Episodes: 11
- icon

Future Diary (Japanese: 未来日記, Hepburn: Mirai Nikki) is a Japanese manga series written and illustrated by Sakae Esuno. It was serialized in Kadokawa Shoten's Shōnen Ace between January 2006 and December 2010, and has been collected into 12 tankōbon volumes. The plot depicts the Diary Game, a deadly battle royale between twelve different individuals who are given "Future Diaries", special diaries that can predict the future, by Deus Ex Machina, the God of Time and Space, with the last survivor becoming heir to the universe.

The manga has been licensed by Tokyopop, and ten of the English volumes were released, with a release for the last two now uncertain due to Tokyopop ceasing publishing in North America. A "pilot anime" DVD was released with the 11th manga volume in December 2010. An anime television series adaptation, produced by Asread, aired in Japan from October 2011 to April 2012. Funimation has licensed the anime for distribution in North America. An 11-episode live-action television drama aired from April to June 2012.

Esuno has also authored three side-story manga, each one spanning five chapters: first Future Diary: Mosaic which focuses on another Diary Holder, Minene Uryu, and tells unrevealed plot points of the main story in 2009 and 2010; Future Diary: Paradox (published in Young Ace), which tells the story of Aru Akise and Muru Muru set in an alternate timeline; and in 2013, Future Diary: Redial, which serves as an epilogue to the series.

== Plot ==
Yukiteru Amano (天野雪輝) is a 14-year-old, shy and daydreaming loner who observes life and jots down the events on his mobile phone. His only friends are Deus Ex Machina (デウス・エクス・マキナ), the God of Space and Time, and his assistant Muru Muru (ムルムル). Deus transforms Yukiteru's phone into a Future Diary, capable of predicting the future up to ninety days. Yukiteru discovers he and eleven others are part of a battle royale survival game orchestrated by Deus. The aim of this game is to eliminate the other diary holders, and in doing so, succeed Deus as god and prevent the Apocalypse. Yukiteru finds himself protected by Yuno Gasai (我妻由乃), a charming but psychopathic classmate who obsessively stalks him after they had promised to go stargazing together a year before.

Two major players they encounter are terrorist Minene Uryu, who wants to destroy all religion after her parents died in a faith-fueled war; and Keigo Kurusu, a police officer who wants to end the game. Later, Kurusu betrays Yukiteru and Yuno when he discovers his bed-ridden son is suffering from a terminal illness. He assassinates diary holder Karyuudo Tsukishima and frames Yukiteru and Yuno. Minene turns to detective Masumi Nishijima, exposing Kurusu's crime. In his shame, Kurusu eliminates himself from the game.

John Bacchus, the city's mayor and designer of the Future Diaries, tries to manipulate Yukiteru's debt-ridden father Kurou into stealing his son's diary. Kurou fails, unintentionally killing his ex-wife Rea, and is then killed by Bacchus' men. Yukiteru vows to win the game and resurrect his parents. He and Yuno target the remaining diary holders, Minene, Bacchus, and Kamado Ueshita who runs an orphanage. Meanwhile, Yukiteru's astute friend Aru Akise, and Nishijima investigate the discovery of three corpses in Yuno's house, including the latter and her parents, bringing her identity into question.

Kamado's diary, which can give others substitute diaries, is connected to a supercomputer, giving everyone in the city Future Diaries as part of Bacchus' plan to help humanity evolve. Yukiteru, Yuno, Minene, Nishijima, and Yukiteru's friends storm Bacchus' headquarters. He seals himself in a bank vault owned by Yuno's parents, her fingerprints the only way to access it. Minene sacrifices herself to destroy the vault but fails, only for Aru to witness Yuno access the vault and kill Bacchus. Wanting answers, Aru confronts Deus who reveals the boy is an artificial human designed to observe the game and keep it in balance, but confirms there is a conspiracy around Yuno.

Yukiteru kills his friends and Kamado. Aru battles Yuno, destroying her diary but discovers she has a spare. Realizing the truth, Aru shows a text to Yukiteru before Yuno decapitates him. As the days to the Apocalypse approach, Yukiteru and Yuno consummate their relationship. However, Yukiteru reveals Aru's suggestion that Yuno originates from another timeline and she immediately turns on him. Muru Muru, the true mastermind behind the game's course, confirms Aru's theory. Yukiteru died and Yuno won the game in another timeline but discovered not even the power of a god could bring back the dead. In her sorrow, Yuno went back in time, creating an alternate timeline, killing and replacing her other self.

Yuno and Muru Muru go back in time again, creating a third world, pursued by Yukiteru and Minene, kept alive by Deus as a wild card and imbued with a portion of his power. Both parties battle to protect or kill the third world's Yuno and her parents. Unable to kill Yukiteru, Yuno traps him in a dream world where she does not exist, and attacks her alternate self. Yukiteru remembers Yuno, escaping his prison aided by the second world's Muru Muru, and stops Yuno. Though Yukiteru asks Yuno to kill him so she can live, she instead kills herself. Yukiteru becomes a god and is dragged to the second world by Muru Muru.

Ten-thousand years later, a grief-stricken Yukiteru has done nothing with his godly powers. He managed to cut off all influences that the first and second worlds had with the third, and prevents the third world's deus from dying. Yukiteru gazes at his diary, mourning that he will never see the first world Yuno, the only one he will ever love, ever again. However, the interdimensional walls are broken down by the third world Yuno, who possesses the first world's memories courtesy of an atoning Muru Muru. Yukiteru and Yuno reunite as gods of the second and third world, and prepare to fulfill their promise to go stargazing with each other.

== Characters ==
Future Diary follows Yukiteru "Yuki" Amano, a socially awkward boy and one of the game's competitors who only wants to survive; Yuno Gasai, another player of the game and a friend who would do anything to be with Yuki; Minene Uryū, an infamous terrorist with a grudge against God; and Aru Akise, a genius teen detective and a friend of Yuki who investigates the true purpose of the game and Yuno's dark secrets.

== Media ==
=== Manga ===
The manga was serialized in Kadokawa Shoten's Shōnen Ace magazine from January 26, 2006, to December 25, 2010 and was compiled into 12 volumes published by Kadokawa Shoten, plus two side-story manga, Future Diary: Mosaic and Future Diary: Paradox, compiled in one volume each. The manga was originally licensed in English by Tokyopop for North America, but only ten volumes were released before Tokyopop ceased publishing operations on May 31, 2011. The series is currently licensed by Viz Media, who released the first nine volumes digitally.

An additional manga titled Future Diary: Redial (未来日記リダイヤル, Mirai Nikki Ridaiyaru) was previewed in the May 2013 issue of Shōnen Ace sold on March 26, 2013, and a single volume of Redial was released in July 2013.

=== Anime ===
An anime television adaptation by Asread and directed by Naoto Hosoda began airing from October 10, 2011. Character designs are done by Eiji Hirayama and Ruriko Watanabe. An eight-minute "pilot" edition DVD was bundled with limited editions of the manga's eleventh volume, released on December 9, 2010. The series uses four pieces of theme music: two opening themes and two ending themes. For the first 14 episodes, the opening theme is "Kūsō Mesology" (空想メソロギヰ, Kūsō Mesorogii; "Fantasy Mesology") by Yōsei Teikoku, and the ending theme is "Blood Teller" by Faylan. From episode 15 onwards, the opening theme is "Dead End" by Faylan, and the ending theme is "Filament" by Yōsei Teikoku. For the pilot, the main theme is "The Creator" by Yōsei Teikoku. Funimation licensed the series for North American distribution, simulcasting the series on Niconico. They later announced they had acquired the rights for release on home video. Following Sony's acquisition of Crunchyroll, the series was moved to Crunchyroll.

An original video animation episode titled Future Diary: Redial acts as an epilogue to the television series. It aired on Niconico on June 19, 2013. It was also bundled with the manga volume sequel of the same name. The opening theme for the OVA is "Kyōki Chinden" (狂気沈殿; "Madness Precipitation") by Yōsei Teikoku, and the ending theme is "Happy End" by Faylan.

=== Other media ===
Kadokawa Shoten produced a visual novel based on the manga titled Future Diary: The 13th Diary Owner (未来日記 -13人目の日記所有者-, Mirai Nikki 13-nin-me no Nikki Shoyūsha) for the PlayStation Portable, was released on January 28, 2010, in Japan. A re-release with new graphics, artwork and featuring the voice actors from the anime was released on April 26, 2012.

An 11-episode live action drama titled Future Diary: Another:World aired between April 21 and June 30, 2012, on Fuji TV. The TV series has an original plot line that differs from the manga and anime. The opening theme is "Another World" by Ko Shibasaki.

== Reception ==
During mid-November 2008, the seventh volume of the Future Diary manga ranked as the twenty-first best selling manga in Japan. The volume remained in the top 30 during the following week, though it dropped to twenty-fifth place. As of April 2012, it has sold 4 million copies in Japan.

The Japanese name of this series is the inspiration for the naming of the Mirai botnet program.
