= Sakae Esuno =

Japanese manga artist

Sakae Esuno えすのサカエ
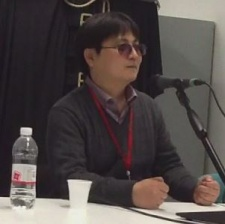
- Born: November 17, 1973 (age 53) Shizuoka Prefecture, Japan
- Area: Manga artist
- Notable works: Future Diary

Sakae Esuno (えすのサカエ, Esuno Sakae; born November 17, 1973) is a Japanese manga artist. He is best known for his manga series Future Diary and Big Order. Esuno started drawing at age 15, at the time he was an admirer of the works of Rumiko Takahashi in particular her horror manga Mermaid Saga. After working as a manga assistant for many years he managed to become a professional manga artist when his story Tetsudō Tenshi (鉄道天使, Railroad Angel) won a prize in a contest held by Kadokawa Shoten in 2001. In the 2017 May issue of Monthly Shōnen Ace magazine, he launched a new manga titled Tantei Akechi wa Kyōran su (The Detective Akechi is Berserk), a tribute to the works of Edogawa Ranpo. The manga ended in the issue published in December 2018. In May 2019, he started the serialization of the manga adaptation of Bokuto Uno's light novel series Reign of the Seven Spellblades in Monthly Shōnen Ace.

== Works ==
- Hanako and the Terror of Allegory (花子と寓話のテラー, Hanako to Gūwa no Terā) (June 2004–November 2005, Monthly Shōnen Ace)
- Future Diary (未来日記, Mirai Nikki) (January 2006–December 2010, Monthly Shōnen Ace)
  - Mirai Nikki Mosaic (未来日記モザイク, Mirai Nikki Mozaiku) (2008)
  - Mirai Nikki Paradox (未来日記パラドックス, Mirai Nikki Paradokksu) (2008)
  - Future Diary: Redial (未来日記リダイヤル, Mirai Nikki Ridaiyaru) (2013)
- Big Order (ビッグオーダー, Biggu Ōdā) (November 2011–September 2016, Monthly Shōnen Ace)
- Tantei Akechi wa Kyōran su (探偵明智は狂乱す) (May 2017–December 2018, Monthly Shōnen Ace)
- Reign of the Seven Spellblades (七つの魔剣が支配する) (May 2019–November 2023, Monthly Shōnen Ace, manga adaptation of the light novel series of the same name by Bokuto Uno)
