= List of The Testament of Sister New Devil chapters =

The cover of the first volume of The Testament of Sister New Devil manga released by Kadokawa Shoten.

The Testament of Sister New Devil is a Japanese manga series written by Tetsuto Uesu and illustrated by Kashiwa Miyako. Adapted from the light novel series of the same name, the series follows Basara Tōjō, and his two little sisters, Mio Naruse and Maria Naruse.

The manga is serialized monthly in Kadokawa Shoten's shōnen manga magazine Shōnen Ace. The series has been licensed for publication in North America by Seven Seas Entertainment.

== Volumes ==
=== The Testament of Sister New Devil ===
No.	Original release date	Original ISBN	English release date	English ISBN
01	Oct 26, 2013	978-4-04-120879-3	January 19, 2016	978-1-626922-46-4
Chapters 1-5
02	February 26, 2014	978-4-04-121039-0	May 3, 2016	978-1-626922-74-7
Chapters 6-10
03	August 26, 2014	978-4-04-101902-3	August 9, 2016	978-1-626922-74-7
Chapters 11-14
04	December 26, 2014	978-4-04-101907-8	November 22, 2016	978-1-626923-58-4
Chapters 15-18
05	March 26, 2015	978-4-04-102789-9	March 28, 2017	978-1-62-692440-6
Chapters 19-22
06	September 26, 2015	978-4-04-102790-5	July 25, 2017	978-1-626925-05-2
Chapters 23-26
07	January 26, 2016 (limited edition); February 26, 2016	978-4-04-102792-9; ISBN 978-4-04-102791-2	November 7, 2017	978-1-626925-83-0
Chapters 27-36
08	August 26, 2016	978-4-04-104535-0	March 20, 2018	978-1-626927-08-7
09	July 25, 2017	978-4-04-104536-7	July 31, 2018	978-1-626928-29-9

=== The Testament of Sister New Devil: Storm! ===
No.	Original release date	Original ISBN	English release date	English ISBN
01	September 29, 2014	978-4-59-214038-2	September 26, 2017	978-1-626926-06-6
Chapters 1-6
02	February 27, 2015	978-4-59-214039-9	January 23, 2018	978-1-626926-81-3
Chapters 7-11
03	September 26, 2015	978-4-59-214040-5	April 3, 2018	978-1-626927-31-5
Chapters 12-17
04	January 29, 2016	978-4-59-214093-1	August 21, 2018	978-1-626928-34-3
Chapters 18-22
05	August 29, 2016	978-4-59-214094-8	November 6, 2018	978-1-626929-25-8
Chapters 23-28

== See also ==
- List of The Testament of Sister New Devil episodes
