= List of The Testament of Sister New Devil episodes =

Cover of the first DVD/Blu-ray volume of The Testament of Sister New Devil as released by Kadokawa Shoten on March 27, 2015

The Testament of Sister New Devil is an anime series adapted from the light novels of the same title by Tetsuto Uesu and Nekosuke Ōkuma. Produced by Production IMS and directed by Hisashi Saito with Takao Yoshioka acting as series organizer, it was broadcast on Tokyo MX from January 7, 2015, to March 25, 2015, and it later continued with the second season from October 9, 2015, to December 11, 2015. The series follows the adventures of Basara Tojo, a young man who befriends Mio Naruse and Maria Naruse, who become like his sisters. After performing a master-slave magical contract with Basara becoming the master to the girls around him, Basara must help defend Mio from the demon and hero clans. The first anime series adapts material from the first three light novels. The first DVD and Blu-ray Disc compilation was released in Japan on March 27, 2015, by Kadokawa Shoten, with individual volumes being released monthly until August 28, 2015, for a total of six volumes.

In March 2015, the first season's twelfth episode announced that a second season would continue broadcasting in Japan in October. The season is titled The Testament of Sister New Devil BURST and it adapts Uesu and Ōkuma's light novels from the fourth through the seventh volumes. The series follows Basara Tojo, Mio Naruse, Maria Naruse, Yuki Nonaka, Kurumi Nonaka, and Zest participating in a tournament in the Demon Realm to protect Mio. The first DVD and Blu-ray compilation of BURST was released on December 25, 2015, by Kadokawa Shoten, with individual volumes being released monthly.

The background music for the series was composed by Yasuharu Takanashi. For the first season, two pieces of theme music were used. The opening theme, titled "Blade of Hope", is performed by the voice actress unit sweet ARMS. The ending theme is "Still Sis" performed by Kaori Sadohara. For the second season, two pieces of theme music were used. The opening theme is "Over The Testament", performed by Metamorphose, a unit consisting of singers Yoko Ishida, Kaori Oda, Aki Misato and Megumi Ogata. 5 versions of the song are played over the 11 episodes, with Yoko Ishida singing Ver.1, Kaori Oda singing Ver.2, Aki Misato singing Ver.3, Megumi Ogata singing Ver.4 and the group singing Ver.5. The ending theme is "Temperature" performed by Dual Flare, a duo consisting of singer Yuki Yamada and voice actress Natsumi Yamada.

A first OVA episode was released on June 22, 2015. A second OVA episode was released on January 26, 2016. A third OVA episode was released on March 28, 2018. The third OVA was Production IMS' final production before the company closed on October 11, 2018.

== Series overview ==
Season	Episodes	Originally released	
Season	Episodes	First released	Last released
1	12	January 7, 2015	March 25, 2015
2	10	October 9, 2015	December 11, 2015

== Episode list ==
=== The Testament of Sister New Devil ===
No.	Title	Original release date (Note: As The Testament of Sister New Devil episodes premiered in Tokyo MX's Wednesday 25:51 (01:51 a.m. JST) time slot, the episodes technically aired the days following the ones listed.)	Refs.
1	"The Day I Got A Little Sister"; Transliteration: "Imōto ga dekita hi" (Japanese: 妹ができた日)	January 7, 2015	
At a local restaurant, Basara Tojo and his father, Jin, wait to meet Basara's new stepsisters, but they are late. After Basara goes to the bathroom to change, he encounters a red-haired girl named Mio Naruse. Mio and her retainer Maria introduce themselves to Basara. The next day, Mio wakes Basara up as part of her service. Basara gets along with his stepsisters well and takes a family photograph. When Mio goes shopping, she is attacked by delinquents, but Basara rescues her, and they escape. Later, Jin leaves on a business trip, and Mio asks Basara to leave the house. It becomes clear that Mio is actually a demon. Maria attempts to repel Basara using magic, but it fails. Basara explains that he is a member of the hero clan and forces Maria and Mio out of his house. Jin calls Basara and tells him that Mio is in danger from the current demon lord's plot to take Mio's inherited strength from her father, Wilbert. Afterward, Mio and Maria are attacked on a hill by an enemy, but Basara rushes over immediately, rescues Mio, and states he came back for his family as he shows their family photograph.
2	"First Contract Between Servant And Master"; Transliteration: "Hajimete no shujū keiyaku" (Japanese: 初めての主従契約)	January 14, 2015	
After being formally accepted into their family, Basara and Mio perform a master-servant magical pact under Maria's supervision, whereas the latter "mistakenly" designates Basara as the master and Mio as his servant. As Mio refuses to perform the kiss of loyalty upon Basara's hand, Mio falls under an aphrodisiac curse, causing Basara to "relieve" Mio by caressing her weak spots and later resulting in Maria being punished by Mio. After transferring to Mio's school, Yuki Nonaka, Basara's childhood friend, reunites with Basara by embracing him in front of Mio and his new class, which causes further uproar as Mio reveals she is living with Basara under one roof. While the students are resentful of his intimate relationship with both Mio and Yuki, Basara is befriended by Yahiro Takagawa. After class dismissal, Yuki warns Basara not to get involved with Mio.
3	"Reunion and a Gap in Trust"; Transliteration: "Saikai to shinrai no hazama" (Japanese: 再会と信頼の狭間)	January 21, 2015	
Knowing that Yuki is observing Mio in lieu of the hero clan, Basara tells Mio's history to Yuki and says that he wants to protect her. Maria arranges a mixed bath for her, Mio, and Basara to gain trust among each other until Basara collapses. At school, while being asked to help Yuki, Mio's curse activates, leading to her exhaustion. At the infirmary, Basara watches over Mio as the school nurse, Chisato Hasegawa, advises Basara to choose his friends while considering who his enemies are. After falling unconscious, stray demons attracted to Mio's strength enter the school. Yuki warns Mio not to get Basara involved, as Mio will bring harm to him. As Mio and Yuki clash, Yuki tells Mio that Basara is not powerful enough to protect her due to an incident from five years ago, which continues to haunt Basara. Basara eventually arrives to stop Yuki and Mio's fight until a stranger (revealed to have dispatched the demons attempting to harm Mio) appears. The stranger informs Mio that if she becomes too much of a threat to her surroundings, the hero clan will label her as a target of observation and killing, leading to Yuki's actions. Another stranger appears behind Mio, resulting in Basara attempting to protect her from it.
4	"When Sadness Reaches Zero"; Transliteration: "Kanashimi ga zero ni naru made" (Japanese: 悲しみがゼロになるまで)	January 28, 2015	
After wounding Basara, the stranger blames Mio for her allies for her cause. As Maria treats Basara, Mio contemplates surrendering herself and her inherited powers to the stranger to prevent her companions from harm. However, Yuki arrives to stop Mio and the stranger's departure and fight him. With the stranger overpowering Yuki, Basara and Maria arrive and defeat the villain using Basara's Banishing Shift technique. However, Basara is injured by the unknown man's demon, causing Mio to lose control of her powers. Basara recovers from his injuries and appeases Mio using his Banishing Shift. In the aftermath, Yuki provides Maria with a special medicine for Basara's recovery and expresses her joy for the latter for completely controlling his powers. At school, Basara exposes Yahiro as the stranger. Basara and Yahiro form a temporary truce as Basara holds the fact of reporting Yahiro's failure to his superiors as leverage and as an act of trust from Yahiro's intention of not killing him and Maria. Yahiro then informs Basara that Zolgia killed Mio's parents. Meanwhile, Jin makes a call to an unknown recipient.
5	"A Little Sister's Morning Demon Lording"; Transliteration: "Asa no imōto no maō musō" (Japanese: 朝の妹の魔王無双)	February 4, 2015	
Following Yahiro's defeat, Basara wakes up with Maria lying on top of him while seducing him, inadvertently encountering Mio naked in the bathroom, Yuki offering herself to bathe with Basara, and Mio suffering her curse once again. At a local restaurant, Yahiro informs Basara that his allies are planning to send reinforcements to observe Mio, as well as further details on the effects of the curse infused in Basara and Mio's pact. Chisato soon joins Basara and Yahiro's table, and afterward, Basara confides with Chisato about his recent dilemmas. Meanwhile, Yahiro meets up with the sent reinforcements as he receives orders from Zest, Zolgia's protégé. After confirming with Maria his findings regarding the effects of Mio's curse, Basara and Maria play a dating sim as a reference for gaining trust between Basara and Mio until Mio drags Maria off. Meanwhile, a trio of hero clan members, Kyōichi Shiba, Takashi Hayase, and Kurumi Nonaka, plot to kill Mio. After rescuing Basara from a group of his school's delinquents, Yuki asks Basara on a date.
6	"Bearing Growing Emotions"; Transliteration: "Tsunoru Omoi o Kakaete" (Japanese: 募る思いを抱えて)	February 11, 2015	
Mio arrives to interfere with Basara and Yuki during their date. As Yuki is separated from the group, a demon named Valga attacks Basara, Mio, and Maria. Takashi and his weapon, Byakko, soon defeat Valga. Shiba introduces himself as an observer and declares a 3v3 match against Basara and his companions the following week. After gaining approval and support from Jin, Basara and the others undergo rigorous training for their upcoming match. After several training sessions, Basara and Mio get intimate to build up their camaraderie as well as their powers. Aware of the upcoming match between Basara and Shiba, Yahiro tells Basara he will have to interfere and kill the hero clan members, including Yuki, if they intend to kill Mio. After declining Yuki's request to withdraw from their battle, Basara hands her a spare key to his house. At the designated location for their match, both parties ready themselves.
7	"The Depths of Love and Hatred"; Transliteration: "Onshū no hate ni" (Japanese: 恩讐の果てに)	February 18, 2015	
In the ensuing battle between the heroes and the demons, Basara uses his Banishing Shift on Kurumi to nullify her attacks, while Maria and Mio duel Takashi. Yuki puts Basara to sleep and assists Maria in fighting Takashi. As Kurumi watches over Basara sleeping, Mio calls out to him to wake him up. After doing so, Basara saves Yuki from certain death by blocking Takashi's attack. As Takashi struggles to defend against Basara, his spear - Byakko - sensing danger to his wielder, manifests into a guardian beast. Basara and Yuki eventually overpower Byakko. Takashi asks Basara to kill him, but Basara declines and states they are friends. Mio lectures Takashi for ridiculing Basara. With the weakened barrier, Shiba enters the battlefield and announces their leave due to the consequences of Byakko losing control in their fight, bringing Yuki along with him.
8	"Erotic Succubus Out of Control"; Transliteration: "Bōsō no erosakyubasu" (Japanese: 暴走のエロサキュバス)	February 25, 2015	
Ten days have passed since the incident with the heroes. Yuki tells Basara that she will live with them to monitor Mio, and Maria offers Yuki to accept a Master/Servant pact with Basara during the next full moon. On the full moon day, the girls are in swim class, and Basara sees Maria running around the school. He finds her and is led to all sorts of places (the girls rest room and the roof where a couple are having sex). When they end up in the changing room, Maria finds Mio's locker and puts her panties on Basara's head. Before he can take them off, the girls return from swim class, forcing the pair to hide in Mio's locker and for Maria to trick Basara. When Mio finds them, she attacks them in the locker but understands they are only there for her safety. This sets off the curse, which Basara makes her submit using the shower head - increasing their powers. Maria meets Lars for some needed information. In the Demon realm, Zolgia watches the fight and Mio's development; he stages another plan to capture her.
9	"Merits and Demerits of Master and Servant"; Transliteration: "Shujū no kōzai" (Japanese: 主従の功罪)	March 4, 2015	
Maria forges the new Master/Servant pact with Basara and Yuki. Finding her buttocks as her sensitive area, Basara and Yuki are also able to level up. The group then takes a bath together for a little bonding time. The next day, Mio and Yuki befriend each other, but then Basara gets injured during basketball practice. At the infirmary, Chisato tells Basara to keep on his path to hold those he cares for close. While Basara is changing, one of Mio's friends asks him if she can get close too, but then comes on strong. Mio and Yuki arrive, and Mio gets jealous and runs off, while Yuki realizes the girls are possessed and it is an ambush. She sends Basara to protect Mio, while she holds off the girls, but when he gets close, Zest and Maria abducts Mio and escapes to Zolgia's realm. When Zolgia attempts to molest her, Maria arrives with a message from the current demon lord, who commands Zolgia to help with a new ruin. In the real world, Lars and Basara discuss that Maria has turned on Mio since her mother is being held hostage, and if Zolgia rapes her, she will die as Basara is her master. Basara offers Lars to help rescue Mio, but he refuses and defeats him. Lars tells Zest to turn Mio over to Lars, using Basara as a trade.
10	"Plaintive Betrayal"; Transliteration: "Aisetsunaru haishin" (Japanese: 哀切なる背信)	March 11, 2015	
Lars threatens Zest and Zolgia by reporting their act of treason to the demon lord for abducting Mio and holding her in their castle if she does not comply with their trade. Zest declines and seemingly kills Lars before ordering Maria to subjugate Basara. However, Basara resist her charms and unleashes his sword powers, allowing Yuki to locate Zolgia's lair, as it was protected by a barrier. Yuki then arrives in Zolgia's lair and clashes with Zest while freeing Mio. Envying Basara's bond with his servants, Zest is soon defeated, as is Maria, who breaks down after Basara embraces her, vowing that he will save her and everyone else. Zolgia incapacitates Mio and Yuki, and attempts to kill Zest for her failure in keeping Mio captive. However, Basara uses his Banishing Shift on Zolgia, nullifying his attack. As Basara and his servants battle the evil demon, Zolgia immobilizes Basara using his mental bondage as he approaches him to obtain his powers for himself.
11	"Espionage... What Lies After"; Transliteration: "Esupionāji... Sore ga saki ni aru mono" (Japanese: 諜報者(エスピオナージ)…その先にあるもの)	March 18, 2015	
Basara struggles to fight against Zolgia. After temporarily disabling Basara, Zolgia faces Maria and shows her mother's remains. Enraged to learn that Zolgia killed her foster parents, Mio blasts off Zolgia's arm and attempts to finish him off. Basara stops her, as Mio's future would be tainted with despair and hatred. As Zolgia retreats, Shella, Maria's mother, reveals she is alive. Outside his lair, Zolgia battles Lars, whom the latter thought to be dead, but is quickly overwhelmed by him. Lars explains that he substituted himself and Shella with his puppet dummies to escape death and intends to kill Zolgia himself to avenge the death of Mio's caretakers, who also fostered him as a child. As Basara and his allies escape Zolgia's lair, the barrier restraining it disappears, thus allowing it to alter itself back to its original form - a giant demonic monster. Trapped inside the beast's belly, Zest guides Basara, Mio, and Yuki into the vital core of the monster and destroys it.
12	"For This Night, This Moment"; Transliteration: "Kono yoru, kono toki no tame ni" (Japanese: この夜、このときのために)	March 25, 2015	
As Yuki fends off any enemy approaching the core, Basara, Mio, and Zest soon fight against a horde of Zest's clones. The group arrives at the core, and Zest offers herself as bait for Basara to kill the beast, but Basara protects Zest and kills the beast. As the girls recover, Basara witnesses Lars killing Zolgia, avenging Mio's foster parents. Back at their home, Zest pledges her loyalty to Basara. In a moment of passion, Basara reacts to the thought of someone else potentially stealing Mio's virginity. Basara and Mio kiss, and just as they are getting closer to having sex, Basara stops mid-way, apologizing for forcing himself onto Mio. As Basara and Mio are about to kiss once again, Yuki interrupts and kisses Basara, accompanied by Zest. As Mio and Yuki argue over Basara, the latter runs to Maria and asks her to help him appease the two. Mio and Yuki force Maria to pick which side she's on, but Maria lunges at Basara and kisses him, refusing to pick either sides, causing Mio and Yuki to yell at her. Shella and Zest are put under the care of the demons from the moderate-faction. Meanwhile, word of Zolgia's death eventually reaches Demon Lord Leohart as he faces Jin in his throne room.
13 (OVA)	"The Hard, Sweet Daily Life of Toujou Basara"; Transliteration: "Tōjō Basara no hādo suwīto na nichijō" (Japanese: 東城刃更のハードスウィートな日常)	June 22, 2015	
While preparing breakfast, Maria sees that Mio is having an erotic dream and decides to use a magic spell, allowing her to record Mio's dream on her camera. In her dream, Mio believes Maria is Basara and allows Maria to strip her naked and almost molest her with a banana, only stopping when the real Basara arrives and punishes Maria. Later, Maria tricks Basara into eating a breakfast with Mio's underwear. Basara is about to punish Maria more harshly when Yuki arrives and immediately removes her own panties so Basara can eat them as well. Upset at his refusal of her panties, Yuki strips naked, but Mio wakes up and subdues Basara and Maria with her lightning. At school, Basara visits Chisato to treat a small cut, but she is only wearing a swimsuit she cannot remove due to a broken zip. Basara manages to open the zip but accidentally exposes her breasts. Instead of being angry, she invites him to dinner after school at her apartment. After cooking for him, Chisato is curious about Basara's physical relationship with Mio and the others and requests that he hug her, which he does while happily claiming her cooking reminds him of how a mother's cooking should taste, even though he can't remember his own mother's cooking. Chisato insists Basara bathe while she washes his clothes so he won't smell like her when he returns home. After she joins him in the bathroom, Chisato admits she invited him there so she could learn what it is like to be in a relationship. An embarrassed Basara allows her to wash his back with her breasts and ends up giving her advice on how to improve her breast-washing technique. Hasegawa ends up giving Basara her first kiss, to which he eagerly responds as they appear to have sex. However, Basara suddenly wakes up confused with his head in Chisato's lap, who claims he passed out from the excitement, though Basara appears only vaguely able to remember being in the bath with her. Now acting like his teacher once more, Chisato offers to drive him home. However, Basara chooses to walk home, claiming he has things to think about.

=== The Testament of Sister New Devil BURST ===
No.	Title	Original release date	Refs.
1	"What I Can Do For You"; Transliteration: "Anata no Tame ni dekiru koto o" (Japanese: あなたの為にできる事を)	October 9, 2015	TBA
After a fierce brawl with the demon lord Leohart, Jin rescues a falling girl then retreats. Basara – being a member of the student's committee - prepares for their sports festival as he nearly gets himself into an altercation with an upperclassman until Chisato intervenes. Sakasaki tells Basara to be cautious around Chisato. Lars advises Mio and Yuki to grow stronger in an event of Basara losing control of his powers. After rescuing Basara from a horde of manipulated civilians, Kurumi witnesses Mio and Yuki 'serving' Basara first hand in the guise of being a part of a ritual between master and servant and eventually gets involved after her bickering with Maria. Driven to protecting his family, Basara swears to defeat his unidentified enemies whoever it may be.
2	"Suspicions Deepening Within Mysteries"; Transliteration: "Fukamaru giwaku to nazo no naka de" (Japanese: 深まる疑惑と謎の中で)	October 16, 2015	TBA
During the sports festival, Kurumi sends out wind spirits to investigate the grounds for any suspicious activity. A manipulated upperclassman summons twisters in the sports grounds and Basara springs into action to quell the situation. Seeing Basara's true nature, Nanao Tachibana reveals himself to be a vampire and duels with Basara. After subduing Tachibana, Basara encounters Chisato and suspects her to be the culprit. Sakasaki guides Basara into safety and reveals that he is an old acquaintance of his father and Chisato's plot of controlling the entire school populace. Basara, however, sees through Sakasaki's lies and the latter is actually Ornis a god was originally sent to the human world with the task of observing Chisato. As Basara submits after seeing the god holding Kurumi hostage, the demon cuts off Basara's arm, disarming him.
3	"My Cherished Feelings For You"; Transliteration: "Yuzurenai omoi o kimi to" (Japanese: 譲れない想いを君と)	October 23, 2015	TBA
With his arm disabled, Basara goes into a rampage and attacks Ornis. However, Chisato intervenes and kills Ornis — who says that he will protect Chisato's purity from Basara — and appeases Basara in his rampaged state. Leohart orders his men to use a recently discovered demon relic against the opposing moderate faction that supports the former reign of demon lord Wilbert under his councils orders. Ramsus, Wilbert's brother, dispatches Maria's older sister Rukia to send a message that Basara and his kin to be summoned to the demon realm immediately. Hesitant at first, Basara, Mio and the others accept.
4	"Amidst Entwining Plots"; Transliteration: "Karamiau omowaku no naka de" (Japanese: 絡み合う思惑の中で)	October 30, 2015	TBA
Basara and the others arrive at Wildart castle where Mio's father once lived, though it is now owned by Ramsus. They are shown to a small servants room they are told they must share. They reunite with Zest, now a maid at the castle, along with Shella. On Ramsus's orders, Rukia punishes Maria for the Zolgia incident but Basara intervenes. Rukia uses her succubus magic to induce arousal in Maria, Basara punishes her. However, Kurumi, who broke castle rules by eavesdropping, must now also be similarly punished by Basara. Basara meets Claus, one of Wilbert's military advisers, who is angry such important guests were only given a servants room and immediately moves them somewhere more appropriate. Claus explains that the war between factions has only grown worse, whereas most of the people have remained loyal to Wilbert and to his daughter, Mio. In disguise as a butler and maids Basara and the others are shown around the main town by Noel, another maid. Mio is surprised by how similar the demon realm is to earth, though Yuki reveals due to high levels of demon magic, heroes like herself and Basara are less powerful than normal. Unwilling to attracting attention as a former servant of Zolgia, Zest separates from the group and is soon accosted by soldiers but is saved by Basara. Claus informs Basara that Ramsus wants to extract the demon lord power from Mio she inherited from her father, which would likely kill her. Mio and the girls share a bath while Basara talks to Ramsus. Elsewhere demons dig up an object they refer to as an ultimate biological weapon from the time of the war between demons and gods.
5	"Amidst the Wind Blowing Through the Battlefield"; Transliteration: "Fukinukeru senjō no kaze no naka o" (Japanese: 吹き抜ける戦場の風の中を)	November 6, 2015	TBA
Ramsus informs Basara that he plans to extract Mio's powers, as he feels that she does not deserve that power since she established her contract with Basara. However, Shella implores everyone that disagreements will not solve their problem while teleporting Basara to a bath house to find Zest, who is only covered by a towel. Under Shella's suggestion, both Basara and Zest agree to perform the Master Servant contract. However the curse is activated immediately due to Zest's own feelings, which she thinks are a hindrance to Basara. While forcing her to submit Basara discovers Zest's weak spot are her pointed ears. On the next day, Wilbert Town is invaded by "Heroic Spirits" led by Gald, who warns that he will destroy the city should Mio remain hidden. To prevent the invasion, Yuki, Kurumi and Zest set off to defeat the invading "Heroic Spirits" while Mio had to stay behind as Claus states as due to political issue. Meanwhile, Basara and Gald fight each other in a duel but Nebra arrives and blasts Basara away. Mio loses her temper defeats the last Heroic Spirit. Fearing over the consequences of failure, Nebra has to kill Mio but fails when Ramsus and Basara intervene. Basara interrogates Nebra over the invasion, only to witness Nebra's death by the "Master Servant" pact to prevent him from turning on his master. Lars arrives to retrieve an unconscious Gald while declaring to Basara that they will fight in their next encounter while informs Toujou Household and allies that Leohart wants to meet him.
6	"Between Reality and One's Own Truth"; Transliteration: "Onore no shinjitsu to genjitsu no hazama de" (Japanese: 己の真実と現実の狭間で)	November 13, 2015	TBA
At Wilbert's Castle, Mio tells Claus that she will live as a human even in the Demon Realm whilst reuniting with Jin. Meanwhile, Leohart learns the entire incident from an injured Gald regarding the powers of Mio and Basara, prompting him to see Mio, Basara and Ramsus as a bigger threat before being comforted by his elder sister Liala. At night, Leohart declares a seven-on-seven duel between both factions and the winning faction will dominate the entire Demon Realm under his decree. Before their preparation, Jin trains Basara at the nearby woods whilst Shella trains the girls (Mio, Maria, Yuki, Zest and Kurumi) in controlling their curse. During one training however, Basara is hospitalized at the nearby bedroom for unlocking his hidden powers, where he learns from Jin that he is possessing three limiters, which he needs at least one (two if necessary) to defeat the Demon Lord. On the next day, Basara and his allies embark their journey for the Royal Palace before Ramsus and Rukia, while Leohart is waiting for his enemy inside his Throne Room.
7	"Between Entwining Plots and Desires"; Transliteration: "Karamiau omowaku to yokubō no hazama de" (Japanese: 絡み合う思惑と欲望の狭間で)	November 20, 2015	TBA
Basara's group briefly meets Leohart, then Belphegor appears and says he has replaced Zolgia as the one in charge of disciplining sex slaves. Basara has an orgy with his girls to level them up. Meanwhile, Belphegor rapes several sex slaves and wants to rape Mio. Basara meets Lars and asks for perfume. Lars gets it while wondering why he wanted it. Yuki has a nightmare of everyone dying, then Basara killing her. When Basara comes back, Mio asks him not to do things on his own. He tells him to trust her before they make love in the shower. As the tournament begins, everyone is informed that if Leohart's team wins, he will own Mio. Both Belphegor and Basara are missing. Mio faces Luka in the first round. Luka summons a giant Heroic Spirit, but Mio overtaxes its regeneration and destroys it, so Luka forfeits. In the second round, Maria faces Lars.
8	"Those Contending For The Future"; Transliteration: "Mirai e to idomumono-tachi" (Japanese: 未来へと挑む者たち)	November 27, 2015	TBA
During the tournament's second round, Maria confronts and fights against Lars but lost in a duel. Elsewhere, Basara infiltrates into the Demon Imperial Palace and attempts to assassinate Belphegor, whom the later notices him but easily killed off by Basara. Back to the tournament, Kurumi lost the third round against her opponent and Zest herself is disqualified for interfering the match and rescuing Kurumi from her death. However, Yuki manages to win for her team during the fifth match until the seventh match, where Leohart is next to appear for the battle. However, Basara is yet to be seen returning from his business, which worries nearly everyone. Meanwhile, Basara is seen lying during his way back to his team.
9	"Beyond the Endless Dream"; Transliteration: "Mihatenuyume no sono sakini" (Japanese: 見果てぬ夢のその先に)	December 4, 2015	TBA
It begins with Basara lying on the ground in an open area, probably in pain or unconscious from the wound received earlier while assassinating Belphegor. In the battlefield, due to the restrictions, the Demon Council speculates that Basara probably won't be able to enter as only the Demon Lords or their kin may enter in there. Basara in the next moment is there on the battlefield. The Council thinks that Basara probably used his Banishing Shift to enter here. The announcer when announcing is sent away by Leohart. The match starts with Basara starting to attack with his speed and using his slash to distract Leohart before attacking him from a different angles. Leohart though initially troubled soon adjusts to this technique. In the watch room, Toujou Household along with Lucia are watching the match are worried as they feel that Basara is not fighting as usual. Lars also thinks about what kind of trump card Basara is going to use. Basara during the next attack after being stopped by Leohart is holding his hand on his wound which he received earlier. Leohart not being troubled by Basara's attack starts to attack Basara. Basara then vanishes his sword and again swiftly brings his sword and slashes swiftly while removing it from its sheath, his special attack. Leohart dodges is informing him that it wouldn't work on him anymore, telling him that he shouldn't have used it on Gald. Elsewhere, in the moderate faction region, Jin is seen taking a nap in the woods, and an unnamed female asks if he isn't going to watch his son's match. Jin replies that Basara at the most has only 20 % chance of winning his battle/match. After being beaten by Leohart, Basara is falling directly into the lava in the middle of the battlefield. He is holding a pill in his left hand recalling the scene when he was given this by Shella informing him that he can use his real powers but he would rampage without control. Just Before falling into the lava, he swallows the pill. Leohart thinking that the match is over starts to walk away but stops after a few steps sensing some danger stops. An Awakened Basara emerges from the lava, and the battle resumes but it is now completely one-sided. Leohart is unable to attack Basara and starts suffering injuries. But Basara starts to pay the price of this rampage as blood shoots out from all over his body. Seeing this Toujou household members get worried and Mio quickly rushes to help Basara. Before Lucia can stop Mio, Yuki stops Lucia realizing that now only Mio can enter the battlefield as the previous Demon Lord's daughter. Mio reaches the battlefield but gets trapped in the visions within Basara's mind. After realizing this she starts to search Basara's current location within his mind, when she encounters the memory of Zolgia. Defeating him, she reaches Basara's location and lets him attack her. Just before his attack can land, he stops himself with his left hand, and destroys the gauntlet on his arm. Still not completely normal, he tears Mio's clothes and lusts on her. Finally back to normal, Basara and Mio land on the battlefield in front of the kneeling Leohart. Basara offers him a hand to get up. Seeing this, the council decides to send their trump card, the King of Heroic Spirits, Chaos. Chaos enters the battlefield and Leohart tells Basara and Mio about the Legendary being which rules all Heroic Spirits. Chaos also commands all the Heroic Spirits and send them all over the Demon Realm. As they start attacking all around, Lucia leaves the watch/observation room informing them that she needs to be around Ramsus. One of the Heroic Spirit attacks the spectators in the stadium near Yuki and Kurumi position. The Council is requested by an unnamed demon to stop the Heroic Spirites as Chaos does not stop summoning them. The Council is unconcerned about that and kills the demon, while Admirath is noticed to be gone somewhere. They decide that as long as they are safe there is nothing to worry about. And if the Demon Realm is destroyed then they can just rebuild it again. Calling this as a test before going against the Gods and Angels. As Chaos attacks the trio of Basara, Mio and Leohart thinking that they will be done for soon, and that the other Heroic Spirits will also kill off Ramsus, solving all their problems. Chaos's attack is neutralized by Basara and the Council realize it is because of his power of Banishing Shift.
10	"The Consequences of What Must Be Done"; Transliteration: "Hatasubeki ishi no atosaki" (Japanese: 果たすべき意思の後先)	December 11, 2015	TBA
Basara, Mio and Leohart take shelter in a damaged building while hiding from Chaos, the King of Heroic Spirits. There is a suggestion to escape from this place but Leohart informs them that Chaos fights by bringing many many Heroic Spirits and they must be destroying the Demon Realm. They decide to work together to bring down Chaos. Ramsus arrives there as well and holds down Chaos by creating a gravitational field below Chaos to bind him. The 4 of them plan to work together against Chaos. Ramsus still holding Chaos, Leohart to use all his powers to distract and attack Chaos, Mio to attack as well, while Basara informs that he will release all 3 of his limiters. While Mio and Leohart engage Chaos, Basara uses the pills given by Maria's mother earlier to remove his limiters and sends Chaos into another dimension using his Banishing Shift in an Awakened Form. He releases his Awakened Form immediately after use. Yuki and Lucia stand ready to fight against Admirath who wants to kill them. They are beside Kurumi and Maria who are being given medical treatment. But Admirath releases poisonous gas from his Scythe even before the fight without letting them know. Due to Yuki being a hero, inhaling the poisonous gas is especially harmful to her and takes her strength. When both of them are unable to continue the fight, Admirath approaches Kurumi to kill her in front of her sister, Yuki and then intends to kill Maria in front of Lucia. Just when he attacks Kurumi, his hand is chopped off by Maria who wakes up. She is very angry that Admirath attacked Yuki and Lucia there and tried to kill Kurumi before her very eyes. Kurumi also wakes up. and they attack Admirath. They were not affected by the gas masks earlier as they had oxygen masks on them preventing the poison from entering their body. Maria fights and kills Admirath. Zest is fighting multiple Heroic Spirits in the arena, thinking about this as a service to her Master, Basara. She beats them up but they get revived immediately, but she continues to fight them putting her trust in Basara and to support him. When the Heroic Spirits were attacking the Demon Realm, Noel tries to save a kid, but gets caught up by the Heroic Spirit together with the kid. She becomes unconscious as Lars comes and attacks the Heroic Spirit. He destroys the Heroic Spirit saving her and the kid. Though his mask gets shattered during the fight, he doesn't puts on another one. Leaving the 2 of them in a safe place, he leaves. After watching Leohart, Ramsus, Basara and Mio fight together and defeat Chaos, the Demon Council attempts to destroy the village, but Liala assassinates them. She calls out to Jin to come out. Jin and Liala talk about their common intentions to destroy the Council. Liala calls Jin "The War God". After their initial stand-off, Liala informs that she currently isn't there to fight him. She says that Basara has inherited his blood and so has so much power. When she suggests killing Basara, Jin and Liala both gather their power for fight but are interrupted before they can start by Basara. Seeing him come there suddenly, Liala is surprised and smells him. She also reveals that Lars is especially favoring Basara's plans. She then leaves after commenting on his scent. Jin tells Basara that she is Leohart's older sister and also she killed the council single-handedly in an instant. Lars is thinking about the time before the match, how he went and helped Basara reach the arena for his battle against Leohart. Ramsus and Jin are also discussing the events. Ramsus informs that with Belphegor's death, the shadow meddling in the Council will stop and also no one will create problems to them immediately for sometime. Ramsus comments that Jin's son has changed the complete history of Demon Realm just for the sake of his sister. Liala, Leohart and his supporters are at Belphegor's house where his dead body and the scene is being investigated. Liala lifts up the cover over Belphegor's dead body and smells it. The smell is similar to Basara's and she realizes that Basara is a very dangerous person, as even though he had taken care of Belphegor (single-handedly) and so had no reason to fight Leohart next, he still went and fought Leohart showing his strength.
11 (OVA)	"Tojo Basara's Perfectly Peaceful Daily Life"; Transliteration: "Toujou Basara no Shigoku Heiwa na Nichijou" (Japanese: 東城刃更の至極平和な日常)	January 26, 2016	
Maria wakes Basara up while naked to try to excite him, so he punishes her. He finds Maria undressed Mio in her sleep, then Yuki tries to seduce him, leading to Mio waking up and getting angry. Mio is late for school because Maria mischievously cut up or turned most of her clothes invisible. In gym, Yuki and Basara are asked to retrieve the basketballs, but Mio catches them in a compromising position and in her anger, all three of them are knocked out and sent to the nurse's office. Chisato wakes Basara up and seduces him. Later, Maria says she just remembered that tomorrow is Mio's birthday. Basara goes to her room to ask what birthday present she wants, only to find Maria had hypnotized her to try to seduce him, saying Basara is Mio's perfect present. When he resists, Maria puts them plus a hypnotized Yuki in an illusion of a festival so they can go on a date. They have fun, but Mio and Yuki compete in Goldfish scooping and get wet. They undress and beg Basara to make love to them. He gives in, but just as they start, Maria runs out of magic, undoing the illusion and hypnosis. They punish Maria, then when Basara and Yuki bring it up, Mio says it is nowhere near her birthday and it was just one of Maria's lies. Mio irately punches Maria.

== OVA ==
No.	Title	Original release date	Refs.
1	"The Testament of Sister New Devil Departures"; Transliteration: "Shinmai Maou no Testament Departures" (Japanese: 新妹魔王の契約者 DEPARTURES)	March 28, 2018	
After Basara saved the demon realm, elders from the hero village hear about these events and agree that Basara has become a potentially dangerous foe. Before leaving for his home world, Basara confirms that Ramsus is actually the previous demon king Wilbert in disguise and has been secretly watching over Mio, though he shadily denies it. Once they arrive home, they see an advertisement about the opening of a new indoor water park and decide to go in order to deepen their bonds and get stronger. While there, Basara and Mio run into Chisato, who tells Basara of an upcoming meeting with her. Seeing Basara and Chisato close with one another, Mio's servant curse activates, forcing Basara to ease it behind a waterfall. On their way home, the group is sent a message from the hero village demanding Basara, Mio, Yuki, and Kurumi return there. Conflicted, Mio, Maria, and Zest attempt to cheer up the group by making food, while Yuki and Kurumi go over battle training. Basara meets with Chisato at a hot spring inn, where he tells her he believes he has to fight his battles alone to save others. After he falls asleep, Chisato appears to transfer some of her godly powers into him and says that she will always fight beside him. The next day, Basara encounters Lars, who after instigating a fight with Basara, creates the illusion of an evil Basara for him to overcome. Realizing the girls are the source of his true strength, Basara defeats his copycat and parts ways with Lars. He arrives home to see each of the girls dressed in wedding dresses, claiming that he is selfish for fighting alone and that they will fight beside him, causing their servant curses to activate. Basara appeases each of them, deepening their bonds and strengthening their resolve. The next morning, they pack their belongings and head out for the hero village.
