= Aesthetica of a Rogue Hero =

Japanese light novel series

- Cover of the first Japanese light novel volume

はぐれ勇者の鬼畜美学 (Hagure Yūsha no Esutetika)
- Genre: Action, fantasy, harem
- Light novel
- Written by: Tetsuto Uesu
- Illustrated by: Tamago no Kimi
- Published by: Hobby Japan
- Imprint: HJ Bunko
- Original run: May 1, 2010 – February 28, 2013
- Volumes: 11
- Manga
- Written by: Tetsuto Uesu
- Illustrated by: Haiji Nakasone
- Published by: Hobby Japan
- English publisher: NA: Manga Planet
- Magazine: Comic Dangan
- Original run: January 20, 2012 – June 21, 2013
- Volumes: 3
- Anime television series
- Directed by: Rion Kujo
- Produced by: Hisato Usui; Ryūji Sekine; Shinsaku Tanaka; Takuro Hatakeyama; Tetsuya Dobashi; Yoshiyuki Ito
- Written by: Ryunosuke Kingetsu
- Music by: Kayo Konishi, Yukio Kondo (MOKA☆)
- Studio: Arms
- Licensed by: Crunchyroll; AUS: Madman Entertainment; UK: Manga Entertainment
- Original network: AT-X, Chiba TV, Sun TV, Tokyo MX, TV Aichi, BS11
- English network: US: Funimation Channel
- Original run: July 6, 2012 – September 21, 2012
- Episodes: 12 + 7 specials
- icon

Aesthetica of a Rogue Hero (Japanese: はぐれ勇者の鬼畜美学(エステティカ), Hepburn: Hagure Yūsha no Esutetika) is a Japanese light novel series written by Tetsuto Uesu and illustrated by Tamago no Kimi. Hobby Japan published eleven volumes between May 2010 and February 2013. A three-volume manga adaptation illustrated by Haiji Nakasone was serialized from 2012 to 2013. A 12-episode anime adaptation by Arms aired between July and September 2012. It has been licensed in North America by Funimation with the Blu-ray version released on December 17, 2013.

Several critics found the anime's premise of heroes returning from fantasy worlds promising but considered its potential underdeveloped. The portrayal of the protagonist and female characters also drew criticism.

== Plot ==
The story follows a world where several young men and women regularly find themselves spirited away to fantasy worlds, including a world of sword and magic called Alayzard (アレイザード, Areizādo). Those who survive and return are typically gifted with magic abilities. An international training organization named Babel protects these young returnees and trains them in the use of their power. A wayward hero named Akatsuki has come back to his world, along with a beautiful girl called Miu who is the daughter of the Last Dark Lord, whom he defeated in battle.

== Characters ==
=== Class B ===
Akatsuki Osawa (鳳沢 暁月, Osawa Akatsuki)
Voiced by: Nobuhiko Okamoto (Japanese); Eric Vale (English)
Akatsuki is the male protagonist and the titular "Rogue Hero". Akatsuki is a tall young man, with messy purple hair and blue eyes. He is usually seen wearing either the standard Babel uniform or gym clothes; while in Alayzard he wears sleeveless medieval-style leather armour. Akatsuki returns to Earth after killing the Dark Lord and becoming a hero in Alayzard. The dying Dark Lord entrusted his daughter, Miu, to Akatsuki and to keep her safe, he brings Miu back to Earth. Like other returnees, Akatsuki attends Babel school along with Miu (who poses as his long-lost sister—although while talking in his sleep, he reveals that his sister is dead). Akatsuki is usually very laid back and displays an almost arrogant (although justified) confidence in his abilities. Despite his rough and sexually inappropriate behavior, he is portrayed as protective of others. Though he does not seem to pay attention much in class, he performs very well academically. Akatsuki, unlike most Babel students, cannot use magic, since he did not learn or pick up any magic in Alayzard. However, he is a master of Renkankei-kikō, which is the ability to control the chi (energy flow) of oneself, others and the surroundings. He was taught how to tap into this power while in Alayzard and in the anime he states that he chose to learn this power in preference to learning magic. The full nature of this power has not been revealed.
Arms Device (or "AD" for short) are wristbands that are given to students during training. When an AD is worn, it conforms to the user's natural powers and abilities and transforms into the weapon most suitable for the user. Akatsuki could not initially generate an AD because he had only been given one of them and it was not strong enough to manifest his power. Upon noticing that something happened when he put on an AD borrowed from a fellow student in addition to his own (believing that his own may be broken), Akatsuki kept putting on more AD (seven) until his AD weapon finally manifested in the form a huge, unusual sword with tremendous power. The seven AD are the minimum number needed to manifest the sword—if he wears more AD wristbands the sword changes shape and becomes even more powerful. This other-dimensional sword, which is called "Laevateinn", has writings engraved upon it. Since discovering this new ability, Akatsuki regularly employs it in battle. He also managed to control "Sleipnir", a magical supersonic motorcycle once driven by his father.
Miu Osawa (鳳沢 美兎, Osawa Miu)
Voiced by: Yōko Hikasa (Japanese); Felecia Angelle (English)
Miu is the main heroine, and the Dark Lord's daughter, whom Akatsuki brought back to the real world to fulfill her father's last wish that he take care of her. Miu is portrayed as a sweet and innocent 16 year old girl with green eyes and pink hair that is usually kept in twin tails. She is a busty young girl of average height; a running gag being her difficulties in finding clothes large enough to fit her chest. She poses as Akatsuki's long-lost little sister to conceal her identity and relies on him for guidance. Miu is initially conflicted about Akatsuki. She knows that she should resent him for killing her father, but she is also grateful to him for saving her from her enemies in Alayzard and looking after her in the real world. She gradually comes to accept that Akatsuki had his role to play (as the Rogue Hero) just as her father was the Hero's enemy and she falls in love with him. Miu has a high level of magical skills, being able to generate Shield Magic without any effort and also use multiple magic spells—from different elements, no less—at one time, and in rapid succession. She seems to favor using Air-type Magic, as most of her magical circles appear green in color. Miu's AD weapon takes the form of a staff with an elaborate head, called Holy Tin. So far she has only been shown using it as a blocking weapon. It is assumed this staff can enhance Miu's magic as well.
Kuzuha Domoto (桐元 葛葉, Dōmoto Kuzuha)
Voiced by: Kana Hanazawa (Japanese); Monica Rial (English)
Kuzuha is a young girl with turquoise hair and blue eyes. She is considerably shorter than the other students due to her age; she was originally enrolled in the grade school branch of Babel before being moved to the high school branch due to her remarkable intelligence. She is the class rep for Class B and takes her job very seriously despite her age. While not liking Akatsuki at first, she grows closer to him, even developing a small crush, after he helps her regain her spirit after an encounter with the Student Council. Akatsuki often teases her about her lack of stature, although not maliciously. She is a close friend of Miu, along with most of the other girls in the story. Her element is Earth and her AD weapon is a giant hammer.
Chikage Izumi (五泉 千影, Izumi Chikage)
Voiced by: Kana Ueda (Japanese); Ryan Reynolds (English)
Chikage is Akatsuki and Miu's classmate. She is a friendly, tomboyish girl with short brown hair and amber eyes. She becomes friends with Miu immediately. She is also openly lesbian, though she develops a slight "liking" for Akatsuki. Her element is Water and her AD weapon is a longbow.
Kenya Onizuka (鬼塚 剣哉, Onizuka Kenya)
Voiced by: Hideo Ishikawa (Japanese); Cris George (English)
Kenya is a problematic student who was demoted to Class B from Class A. He does not get along with other students and tends to bully them. Akatsuki sets him in his place on the first day of school, leading to him resenting Akatsuki, but during the Babel Ranking Tournament incident he bravely confronts Phil by himself. His element is Fire and his AD weapon is two pairs of chakrams.

=== Class A ===
Motoharu Kaido (海堂 元春, Kaidō Motoharu)
Voiced by: Atsushi Abe (Japanese); Joel McDonald (English)
Kaidō is a laid-back, troublemaker student who declares himself to be the "leftover" of Class A. Despite talking to Akatsuki only a few times, Kaidō declares himself Akatsuki's best friend and calls him "Akki". He is implied to have ulterior motives (something to do with the organization known as Scarlet Twilight) and be very powerful, but so far has refrained from confronting Akatsuki, who he believes has yet to reveal his true strength.

=== Student Council ===
Kyoya Hikami (氷神 京也, Hikami Kyōya)
Voiced by: Takahiro Sakurai (Japanese); Jerry Jewell (English)
Kyoya is the Student Council's President. He has silver hair and blue eyes. A member of the COCOON, he usually has a manipulative smile on his face and a cold look in his eyes. He is calm and collected towards Akatsuki's taunts to fight, however he has an interest in Akatsuki. He is also implied to have power equal to that of Akatsuki. His element is Ice and his AD weapon has not yet been seen.
Haruka Nanase (七瀬 遥, Nanase Haruka)
Voiced by: Marina Inoue (Japanese); Alexis Tipton (English)
Haruka is the Vice President of the Student Council. She has long, green hair and green eyes. She takes an initial dislike to Akatsuki for his non-compliant behavior in school. This dislike escalates to a deep resentment after he humiliates her by stealing both her panties and bra while being disciplined by the student council. She often refers to Akatsuki as a "wolf" and other predatory names, but she seems to develop a crush on him later on after seeing him help others (during the hostage taking, for example). Her element is Wind and her AD weapons are two push knives (similar to Eskimo Ulu).
Ryohei Uesaki (上崎 遼平, Uesaki Ryōhei)
Voiced by: Satoshi Hino (Japanese); Dallas Reid (English)
Ryohei is the Secretary of the Student Council and has brown, short hair. His element is Fire and his AD weapon is a Dao (Chinese Broadsword). Although in Season 1, episode 8 it briefly shows him standing on the cliff holding a Dao in his right hand while another hilt is shown protruding from his left waist so it may be that he actually uses a pair of Dao.
Minami Aihara (哀原 美奈巳, Aihara Minami)
Voiced by: Ayana Taketatsu (Japanese); Mandy Lane (English)
Minami is the Treasurer of the Student Council. She has long brown hair and brown eyes. A quiet girl, she says things only when she needs to. Her element is Earth and her AD weapon is a single headed chain weapon known as a Liuxing Chui (Meteor Hammer).

=== Alayzard ===
Listy El Da Sherfied (リスティ・エル・ダ・シェルフィード, Risuti Eru Da Sherufīdo)
Voiced by: Rina Satō (Japanese); Colleen Clinkenbeard (English)
Listy is the Princess of Sylphid, a country in Alayzard, whose brother died protecting Akatsuki. After the Dark Lord's demise, she attempts to prevent Akatsuki from returning home, unaware of his oath to protect Miu. She also seems to have some kind of affection towards Akatsuki. (She also does the previews for the next episodes in the anime adaptation.)
Leon Aceperio (レオン・エスペリオ, Reon Esuperio)
Leon was a hero of Alayzard who was engaged to Listy. He was killed by Galious while fighting him alongside Akatsuki and a splendid tomb was constructed for him. Unfortunately, the tomb was destroyed by Phil out of resentment over his own status and that the people were honoring someone who had failed.

=== Others ===
Phil Barnett (フィル・バーネット, Firu Bānetto)
Voiced by: Noriaki Sugiyama (Japanese); Todd Haberkorn (English)
A holy knight of the Disdian army. He is ordered to capture Miu and return her to Alayzard for execution. He is also ordered to kill Akatsuki if he interferes. Phil made a contract with Zahhaku, a devious dragon from Alayzard, and uses it to attack anyone who stands in his way, especially Akatsuki. His weapon is capable of inflicting poison, which typically results in instant death. Phil destroyed Leon's tomb out of resentment and for glory, referring to Leon as an eyesore to him.

== Media ==
=== Light novels ===
The light novel series written by Tetsuto Uesu and illustrated by Tamago no Kimi was published by Hobby Japan in eleven volumes from May 1, 2010, to February 28, 2013.

No.	Title	Release date	ISBN
1	The Fiendish Hero Returned from Another World! (鬼畜な勇者が異世界から帰ってきた！ Kichikuna Yūsha ga i Sekai kara Kaettekita!)	May 1, 2010	978-4-7986-0042-0
1. Prologue: Goodbye Parallel World; 2. Chapter 1: Hello Reality; 3. Chapter 2: The Hot-Headed Loafer's Youthful Rampage; 4. Chapter 3: Bonds of Holy Water; 5. Chapter 4: A Hero's Silhouette; 6. Epilogue: The World Begins to Move; 7. Afterword
2	Kichikuna Yūsha ni Aratana Shikaku!! (鬼畜な勇者に新たな刺客!!)	July 31, 2010	978-4-7986-0104-5
1. Prologue: I Will Never Forget You; 2. Chapter 1; 3. Chapter 2; 4. Chapter 3; 5. Chapter 4; 6. Epilogue; 7. Afterword
3	Hagure Yūsha VS Shin Yūsha! (はぐれ勇者VS新・勇者！)	November 1, 2010	978-4-7986-0138-0
1. Prologue: Fomenting of Malicious Claw Marks; 2. Chapter 1; 3. Chapter 2; 4. Chapter 3; 5. Epilogue; 6. Afterword
4	Hagure Yūsha Akatsuki wa Futatabi Areizādo o Sukuu Koto ga Dekiru no Ka!? はぐれ勇者・暁月は再びアレイザードを救うことができるのか!?	February 1, 2011	978-4-7986-0180-9
1. Prologue: The signal of the end of peace 2. Chapter 1: A Comfortable and Pleasant Alternative World Trip; 3. Chapter 2: Brushing Past the Idea of Peace; 4. Chapter 3: The Unchanging Truth; 5. Chapter 4: Absolutely won't Concede; 6. Epilogue: Respective Decision; 7. Afterword
5	Maō to-ka Shita Akatsuki no Shin'i to Wa? 魔王と化した暁月の真意とは？	April 28, 2011	978-4-7986-0225-7
1. Prologue: Everyone's goal we hope 2. Chapter 1: Within the Unavoidable Fate; 3. Chapter 2: A War where a Hero Doesn't Exist; 4. Chapter 3: Opening the Door to the Truth; 5. Chapter 4: Maidens Make Their Move; 6. Chapter 5: Just Wanted to Tell You; 7. Epilogue: Preparations for the Future; 8. Afterword
6	Genjitsu Sekai wa Sarani Atsui ze!! (現実世界はさらに熱いぜ!!)	July 29, 2011	978-4-7986-0264-6
Prologue: Early Morning Company; Chapter 1: The Young Girl's Holiday; Chapter 2: Melancholy of a Lonely Wild Dog; Chapter 3: The Late Night Express Train of Youth; Epilogue: The Dawn Before the Storm; 1. Afterword
7	Inbō Uzumaku Baberu. Sono Chūshin ni Iru no Wa? (陰謀渦巻くバベル。その中心にいるのは？)	November 30, 2011	978-4-7986-0321-6
1. Prologue: The Future Cannot be Avoided; 2. Chapter 1: The Girls' Late-night Festival; 3. Chapter 2: Crossroad of Ideas; 4. Chapter 3: Still Just Facing Forwards; 5. Chapter 4: Realizing the Point of the Fall; 6. Epilogue: The Truth in the Darkness; 7. Afterword
8	Batoru & Batoru! "Kyōya-hen" Saikōchō! (バトル&バトル！ 『京也編』最高潮！)	February 29, 2012	978-4-7986-0359-9
1. Prologue: Omen of the Upcoming Conflict and Chaos; 2. Chapter 1: The Thoughts of the Other Side; 3. Chapter 2: Twilight's Domain; 4. Chapter 3: Why......; 5. Chapter 4: Who Believed In You More Than Anyone; 6. Epilogue: Tragedy's Starting Point; 7. Afterword
9	Tsuini "Kyōya-hen" Kanketsu! (ついに『京也編』完結！)	June 29, 2012	978-4-7986-0422-0
1. Prologue: No Escaping the Present and the Future; 2. Chapter 1: Endless Battle; 3. Chapter 2; 4. Chapter 3; 5. Chapter 4; 6. Epilogue 1; 7. Epilogue 2; 8. Afterword
10	Dai 3 Seiryoku ni Noboritsumeta Akatsuki no Shin Fumi Kaimaku! (第3勢力に上り詰めた暁月の新章開幕！)	September 29, 2012	978-4-7986-0473-2
1. Prologue: Small desire kept secret 2. Chapter 1; 3. Chapter 2; 4. Chapter 3; 5. Chapter 4; 6. Epilogue; 7. Afterword
11	Akatsuki ga Tachi Ageta Shin Dantai Noa ga Ugokidasu (暁月が立ち上げた新団体ノアが動き出す)	February 28, 2013	978-4-7986-0566-1
1. Prologue; 2. Chapter 1; 3. Chapter 2; 4. Chapter 3; 5. Epilogue; 6. Afterword

=== Manga ===
A manga adaptation illustrated by Haiji Nakasone was published in Hobby Japan's web magazine Comic Dangan from January 20, 2012, to June 21, 2013, and compiled into three volumes. The manga is licensed in English by Manga Planet.

No.	Japanese release date	Japanese ISBN
1	July 27, 2012	978-4-7986-0428-2
2	January 26, 2013	978-4-7986-0528-9
3	August 27, 2013	978-4-7986-0663-7

=== Anime ===
A 12-episode anime adaptation by Arms and directed by Rion Kujō aired between July and September 2012. It has been licensed by Funimation in North America. Following Sony's acquisition of Crunchyroll, the series was moved to Crunchyroll. The opening theme is "Realization" by Faylan and the ending theme is "Ai no Sei de Nemurenai" by Aki Misato. Seven special short episodes titled "Hajirai Ippai" (numbered 0 to 6) were also included with the Blu-ray releases.

==== Episode list ====
No.	Title	Original release date
1	"New Game Plus" "Tsuyokute Nyū Gēmu" (Japanese: 強くてニューゲーム)	July 6, 2012
Akatsuki Ousawa, an Earthling summoned to the world of Alayzard, has recently defeated a Dark Lord who threatened the realm. He flees through a forest pursued by warrior maids whom he defeats by stealing their underwear. Princess Listy tries to stop him from leaving by confessing her feelings for him, but after kissing her, he insists he must return home and enters a portal. Upon returning home it is revealed he has brought with him Miu, the Dark Lord's daughter who was entrusted to him by her father with his dying wish. Together they attend entrance exams for a special school where they both prove to be extraordinarily gifted in combat based magic. Akatsuki has an encounter with student council president Kyoya Hikami.
2	"Bonds of Holy Water" "Seisui no Kizuna" (Japanese: 聖水の絆)	July 13, 2012
Miu considers killing Akatsuki in his sleep but reconsiders just as a still asleep Akatsuki defends himself in an unusual manner. They both enroll in a special school for people who have returned from other worlds with magic powers. Akatsuki immediately gets into trouble by beating up the class bully Onizuka, earning him the attention of the school's Discipline Committee, especially student council Vice President, Haruka Nagase, whom Akatsuki deliberately aggravates by managing to steal her underwear. Akatsuki is later accidentally locked in a storage room with Miu and his classmates Kuzuha Dōmoto and Chikage Izumi. Dōmoto eventually needs to go to the toilet, and Akatsuki handles the situation by magically manipulating pressure points on Miu and Chikage's bodies, using the logic that it won't be as embarrassing for Domoto if all three girls wet themselves, which they then do. After beating him up the three girls shower together and end up becoming friends via their new mutual dislike for Akatsuki, leaving Miu to wonder if Akatsuki made himself the bad guy on purpose so she could make friends.
3	"To Become an Adult" "Otona ni Naru niwa" (Japanese: 大人になるには)	July 20, 2012
The student council orders Kuzuha, as the class representative, to keep watch over Akatsuki and report his actions to them. It turns out that she is concerned about going to school with students so much older than she is. Akatsuki cheers her up and tells her to do as the student council has asked, since it will not deter him in the slightest. Later, during combat practice, the students find that their foe, a low level cockatrice, has been tampered with and is now too powerful to handle.
4	"The Hero's Back" "Yūsha no Senaka" (Japanese: 勇者の背中)	July 27, 2012
Akatsuki figures out how to summon his Arms Device, a large demonic sword previously used by Miu's Dark Lord father, and after dispatching the monster, exposes the culprit behind the attack as one of Onizuka's victims who wanted to frame Onizuka. The culprit is subsequently frozen in ice by the student council president. After helping Miu recover with healing magic and helping her come to terms with losing her father, Akatsuki meets Class A student, Kaidō Motoharu, who attacks him to measure his strength.
5	"Just a Short Repose" "Tada, Sonna Kyūjitsu no Hitotoki o" (Japanese: ただ、そんな休日の一時を)	August 3, 2012
Akatsuki joins Miu and her friends for a trip to the mall so Miu can make new happy memories. At first Akatsuki appears to be peeping on Miu while she tries on bras in the dressing room, but due to his "extensive" knowledge of such things, ends up helping her find one that fits her perfectly. Haruka is also out shopping for new exotic underwear that she hopes even Akatsuki will not find easy to remove.
6	"Supersonic Sleipnir!" "Chōonsoku! Sureipuniru" (Japanese: 超音速！スレイプニル)	August 10, 2012
Kaidō introduces Akatsuki to the director of the school's mechanical department where they see Sleipnir, a powerful magical bike that rejects anyone it deems unworthy of riding it. It initially rejects Akatsuki, but after learning that his father rode the bike, he becomes more determined and subdues Sleipnir. However, when Haruka attempts to remove Akatsuki from the bike Sleipnir responds by disintegrating her clothes. Akatsuki takes pity on her and gives her his jacket. Later Akatsuki joins the student council in dealing with a hostage situation and succeeds in saving a young girl. Haruka berates him for being reckless and arrogant, until the young girls mother mistakenly thanks Haruka for saving her daughter. Elsewhere in the building Kaido violently deals with another terrorist while revealing he may be more dangerous than he appears. Later Haruka, who is starting to become attracted to Akatsuki, returns his jacket to Miu, too flustered to face him personally.
7	"A Crude Panic on the Beach!" "Nagisa no Kichiku Panikku!" (Japanese: 渚の鬼畜パニック！)	August 17, 2012
Akatsuki and his friends go to the beach and join a special game of tag wherein you are tagged out if you lose your swimsuit. Using his considerable skills Akatsuki succeeds in removing the bikini tops of every girl on the beach, including Haruka who also loses her bottoms. However, Akatsuki is disqualified during his attempt to remove Miu's bikini as he leaves the designated game area. Meanwhile, in Alayzard, Emperor Baram of Disdia learns that Miu is on Earth and sends his envoy, Phil Barnett, to capture her.
8	"BABEL's Ranking Matches Begin" "BABEL Rankingu Sen, Kaishi" (Japanese: BABELランキング戦、開始)	August 24, 2012
The annual ranking tournament, held to measure the strength of the students, has arrived. Akatsuki, Miu, Kuzuha and Chikage team up and easily subdues all opposition. That evening, Akatsuki accepts the student council's challenge to fight him. Their match is interrupted by Kaidō, who warns that the magic barrier that protects the students from actually being harmed has been sabotaged and if they fight now they will kill each other by mistake.
9	"On Such a Beautiful Moonlit Night" "Konna nimo Kirei na Tsukiyo no Ban ni" (Japanese: こんなにも綺麗な月夜の晩に)	August 31, 2012
The intruder is revealed to be Phil, who chases after Miu while severely wounding everyone else who has crossed his path. As Phil confronts Miu he reveals Miu is to be publicly executed for political purposes and then attempts to sexually assault her. Akatsuki arrives just as Miu sheds a tear and swears to make Phil pay for making Miu cry.
10	"Where I Belong" "Boku no Ibasho" (Japanese: ボクの居場所)	September 7, 2012
After a vicious battle, Akatsuki knocks Phil down. Thinking that neither Alayzard nor Earth are safe as long as she is present, Miu jumps into the river but is saved by Akatsuki. He talks her out of committing suicide and ends up kissing her before collapsing from a poisoned wound he received from Phil. Stripping them both naked Miu helps Akatsuki heal by sharing her body heat, though it turns out this was unnecessary as Akatsuki had been awake the entire time, much to Miu's embarrassment. However, Phil appears once more claiming he will no longer hold back against Akatsuki.
11	"Before Daybreak" "Yoake ga Kuru Mae ni" (Japanese: 夜明けが来る前に)	September 14, 2012
Phil summons a huge dragon and fuses with it. To give time for Akatsuki to recover from the poison, Miu and the others engage in a duel with the dragon. When Akatsuki recovers and rejoins the fight, the dragon uses its breath weapon to obliterate everything around it.
12	"The World is Watching You" "Sekai ga Kimi o Mitsumete" (Japanese: 世界が君を見つめて)	September 21, 2012
Akatsuki protects the others from the blast but loses his ability to summon his demon sword. However, with help from Miu he manages to summon his sword and unlock its full power. The dragon is defeated when Akatsuki cuts it in half from nose to tail. Soon after, Miu reveals the truth about herself to Kuzuha and Chikage. The members of COCCOON analyze recent events and their impact on their plans. Akatsuki and his team placed first in the rankings tournament and are moved into the A class. Akatsuki and Miu are now dating. Akatsuki later realizes that Alayzard is in turmoil and decides to return there to check on the situation. Miu, Chikage and Kuzuha insist on going with him, and Haruka and Kaidō arrive just in time to join them as well.
Special–0	"Queen's Blade: Rebellion vs. Hagure Yuusha no Estetica"	June 27, 2012
In a crossover with Queen's Blade Rebellion, Akatsuki finds himself in the Continent and effortlessly defeats Branwen, Liliana, Mirim, Luna, Sigui, and Annelotte. Deciding this world is interesting, Akatsuki departs through a portal.
Special–1	"A New Battle Suit?" "Atarashī batorusūtsu?" (Japanese: 新しいバトルスーツ?)	January 20, 2013
Miu is displeased with her battle uniform, so Kuzuha tells her she can alter it with her mind. She tries, but to her dismay, it transforms into a maid outfit, then a nurse outfit, then a Playboy Bunny. Chikage realizes this is because Miu is subconsciously thinking about pleasing Akatsuki and urges her to clear her mind. She tries again and it turns into a tied up BDSM outfit. Kuzuha and Chikage conclude Miu must really love Akatsuki while Miu screams in embarrassment.
Special–2	"What Does It Take to Be a Grown Woman?" "Seichōshita josei ni naruniha nani ga hitsuyōdesu ka?" (Japanese: 成長した女性になるには何が必要ですか？)	January 20, 2013
Chikage starts teaching Miu and Kuzuha how to be grown ups and first gets Miu to wear a revealing kimono, then the naked apron. Miu is embarrassed when Kuzuha points out Chikage simply wanted to see her naked. Akatsuki walks in and makes the other two wear the naked apron as well. He gives Kuzuha a lesson on being a grown up by using pressure points and groping to make Miu and Chikage orgasm. Kuzuha says she already knew about that while Miu says being a grown up is hard.
Special–3	"Bound By the "Holy Water"" "`Seisui' ni shibarareta" (Japanese: 「聖水」に縛られた)	January 20, 2013
Haruka buys chastity belts to prevent Akatsuki from stealing her underwear. She gives one to Minami as well, but when Minami needs to pee, Haruka realizes she lost the key to the belts. Akatsuki shows up and uses pressure points on Haruka to make her need to pee as well, reasoning that it won't be embarrassing if both of them do it. Despite their best efforts, both of them wet themselves, then an irate Haruka punches him.
Special–4	"Mixed Bath on the Shore" "Kaigan no kon'yoku" (Japanese: 海岸の混浴)	January 20, 2013
Set after "A Crude Panic on the Beach!", Miu, Kuzuha, and Chikage relax in a makeshift hot spring. Just as Chikage starts groping Miu, Akatsuki shows up and saying he will relax them, inserts his Chi into the two, making them orgasm and pass out. When he is about to do it to Kuzuha, Miu and Chikage wake up and attack him. He effortlessly counters them, then says he needs to start over again and corners the three much to their dismay.
Special–5	"Ranking Battle Side Story-Another Sexy Version" "Rankingubatorusaidosutōrī - betsu no sekushīna bājon" (Japanese: ランキングバトルサイドストーリー-別のセクシーなバージョン)	January 20, 2013
During a training exercise, several girls get attacked by a slime monster. Miu and Haruka destroy it, but they are all weakened by contact with the slime. Akatsuki tells them they have been poisoned, so they must remove their slime-soaked clothes and then he will cure them. They are too embarrassed to undress, but they have been paralyzed, so Akatsuki strips them naked and gropes them while sharing his Chi, making them orgasm while curing them. As he works on the other girls, Miu and Haruka comment Akatsuki is even scarier than a slime monster.
Special–6	"The Beautiful Demon Warrior, Miu" "Utsukushī akuma no senshi, Myū" (Japanese: 美しい悪魔の戦士、ミュウ)	January 20, 2013
Miu and Haruka abruptly wake up in Alayzard, then Listy walks up and says their friends have been captured. Before they can move, a plant monster appears and captures them with its tendrils, then starts stripping and molesting them. Listy sees Miu's legs are spread and says it is a sacred pose that excites monsters. Miu suddenly wakes up in front of the TV and Akatsuki tells her to stop staying up so late and go to sleep. She wonders if that was really a dream.

== Reception ==
Writing in the third edition of The Anime Encyclopedia (2015), Jonathan Clements and Helen McCarthy placed the series in a tradition of anime pairing ordinary Japanese men with supernatural women, dating back to Urusei Yatsura. However, they regarded its treatment of adventures in parallel worlds as a commonplace phenomenon requiring subsequent reintegration into society as an interesting postmodern concept. Comparing the series to Dennō Coil, they interpreted its premise as an allegory of contemporary video game culture, in which players' extraordinary achievements in fictional worlds can influence their everyday lives. They nonetheless felt that the narrative potential of this premise was squandered on a conventional, fan-service-heavy harem story. In their entry on everyday anime, they singled out the series as an example of anime reflecting the experiences of a generation raised on video games, for whom everyday reality, rather than fantastic adventures, was becoming unfamiliar territory. They also drew parallels with the following year's The Devil Is a Part-Timer!, discussing both works in relation to the juxtaposition of fantastic adventures with mundane everyday life in gaming culture.

Bamboo Dong of Anime News Network, reviewing the first four episodes, described the series' fan service as "hyper-misogynistic". She criticized the portrayal of Akatsuki as gallant despite his sexually abusive behavior, as well as the depiction of the series' sole lesbian character repeatedly making unwanted sexual advances toward other women. She found these elements detracted from the series' potential, given its otherwise interesting premise. Rebecca Silverman, reviewing the first six episodes for the same website, noted that Akatsuki was more assertive, resourceful and sexually aware than the typical harem protagonist. However, she criticized the contrast between his seemingly heroic qualities and his mistreatment of women, arguing that his apparent kindness was often self-serving. Silverman also criticized the slow development of the plot, the lack of distinctive character designs and the lack of fluidity in the animation. Like Dong, Silverman also criticized the portrayal of the series' lesbian character, Chikage, as repeatedly making unwanted sexual advances toward other female characters.

Reviewing the complete series for Anime News Network in 2014, Theron Martin interpreted Akatsuki's characterization as an attempt to combine traditional shōnen and harem conventions, with mixed results. He noted that the protagonist's assertiveness addressed a common criticism of harem anime voiced by non-Japanese fans, but argued that his behavior sometimes crossed the boundary between playfulness and sexual aggression. Martin found the return from another world and the hero's role as guardian of his defeated enemy's daughter refreshing, but criticized the limited exploration of the setting's backstory. He considered the depiction of Miu's difficulties adjusting to a new world less developed than in The Devil Is a Part-Timer!. He welcomed the developing friendship among the female characters, but criticized the animation of the action sequences.

Dan Barnett of UK Anime Network gave the series a score of 7 out of 10. He praised its humor, direction and voice acting, and found Akatsuki more entertaining than conventional harem protagonists. However, he criticized the animation, character designs, uneven pacing and numerous unresolved plot threads, and considered High School DxD a better example of the genre.

Tristan Crocker of Anime Herald also considered the initial premise and several subplots promising, but criticized the protagonist's sexually aggressive behavior and the lack of dramatic tension resulting from his ability to overcome virtually any obstacle. He also criticized the limited characterization of the female cast, although he praised the animation and character designs.

== See also ==
- The Testament of Sister New Devil, another series by the same author
- The Unwanted Undead Adventurer, another series whose manga adaptation shares the same illustrator
