= Tetsuto Uesu =

Japanese novelist

- 上栖綴人
- Born: Hokkaido Prefecture, Japan
- Occupation: Novelist
- Writing career
- Language: Japanese
- Genre: Light novel
- Notable works: Aesthetica of a Rogue Hero, The Testament of Sister New Devil
- Notable awards: 2nd Novel Japan Award of Excellence (Megane HOLIC Shindoro~mu)
- Website: はい、こちら現場の上栖です!

Tetsuto Uesu (上栖綴人, Uesu Tetsuto) is a Japanese novelist and editor from the Hokkaido Prefecture.

== Career ==
In 2008, his novel Megane-HOLIC Shindoro~mu (眼鏡HOLICしんどろ〜む) won the 2nd Japan Award of Excellence under the pen name Tetsujin Ueisu (上衛栖鐵人), a novel he debuted with and later renamed to Kanojo wa Megane-HOLIC (彼女は眼鏡HOLIC) under the HJ Bunko label.

His series Aesthetica of a Rogue Hero and The Testament of Sister New Devil were both adapted to anime.

== Works ==
- Kanojo wa Megane-HOLIC (彼女は眼鏡HOLIC) (Illustrated by Tomoseshunsaku, published by HJ Bunko, 3 volumes, 2008–2009)
- ギブあっぷ!（『HJ文庫』、イラスト：会田孝信、全3巻）
- Give Up! (ギブあっぷ!) (Illustrated by Takanobu Aida, published by HJ Bunko, 3 volumes, 2009–2010)
- Aesthetica of a Rogue Hero (はぐれ勇者の鬼畜美学) (Illustrated by Tamago no Kimi, published by HJ Bunko, 11 volumes, 2010–2013)
- The Testament of Sister New Devil (新妹魔王の契約者) (Illustrated by Nekosuke Ōkuma, published by Kadokawa Sneaker Bunko, 13 volumes (+ 2 side stories), 2012–2021)
- Yarisugita Majin Senmetsusha no Shichi Daizai Yūgi (やりすぎた魔神殲滅者の七大罪遊戯) (Illustrated by GoHands, published by Kodansha LIGHT NOVEL, 3 volumes, 2018-)
