= The Testament of Sister New Devil =

Japanese light novel series and its adaptations

- First light novel volume cover featuring Basara Tojo (left) and Mio Naruse (right)

新妹魔王の契約者(テスタメント) (Shinmai Maō no Tesutamento)
- Genre: Action; Harem; Supernatural
- Light novel
- Written by: Tetsuto Uesu
- Illustrated by: Nekosuke Ōkuma
- Published by: Kadokawa Shoten
- Imprint: Kadokawa Sneaker Bunko
- Original run: September 29, 2012 – March 31, 2021
- Volumes: 13
- Manga
- Written by: Tetsuto Uesu
- Illustrated by: Kashiwa Miyako
- Published by: Kadokawa Shoten
- English publisher: NA: Seven Seas
- Magazine: Shōnen Ace
- Original run: May 26, 2013 – July 25, 2017
- Volumes: 9
- Manga

The Testament of Sister New Devil: Storm!
- Written by: Tetsuto Uesu
- Illustrated by: Fumihiro Kiso
- Published by: Hakusensha
- English publisher: NA: Seven Seas
- Magazine: Young Animal Arashi
- Original run: September 29, 2014 – August 29, 2016
- Volumes: 5
- Anime television series
- Directed by: Hisashi Saitō
- Produced by: Chiaki Kurakane
- Written by: Takao Yoshioka
- Music by: Yasuharu Takanashi
- Studio: Production IMS
- Licensed by: Crunchyroll
- Original network: Tokyo MX, Sun TV, AT-X, GBS, MTV, BS11, TV Saitama, CTC, tvk, TVQ
- Original run: January 7, 2015 – March 25, 2015
- Episodes: 12 + OVA
- Anime television series

The Testament of Sister New Devil BURST
- Directed by: Hisashi Saitō
- Produced by: Chiaki Kurakane; Satoshi Motonaga
- Written by: Sumio Uetake; Takao Yoshioka (Series Composition Supervision)
- Music by: Yasuharu Takanashi
- Studio: Production IMS
- Licensed by: Crunchyroll
- Original network: Tokyo MX, Sun TV, AT-X, BS11, CTC, tvk, TV Saitama, GBS, MTV, TVQ
- Original run: October 9, 2015 – December 11, 2015
- Episodes: 10 + OVA
- Original video animation

The Testament of Sister New Devil DEPARTURES
- Directed by: Hisashi Saitō
- Produced by: Satoshi Motonaga
- Written by: Yasunori Yamada; Takao Yoshioka (Series Composition Supervision)
- Music by: Yasuharu Takanashi
- Studio: Production IMS
- Released: March 28, 2018
- Runtime: 60 minutes
- icon

The Testament of Sister New Devil (Japanese: 新妹魔王の契約者(テスタメント), Hepburn: Shinmai Maō no Tesutamento) is a Japanese light novel series written by Tetsuto Uesu and illustrated by Nekosuke Ōkuma. Thirteen volumes have been published by Kadokawa Shoten since 2012 under their Kadokawa Sneaker Bunko imprint. A manga adaptation has been serialized in Kadokawa Shoten's Shōnen Ace magazine since May 2013. A second manga adaptation has been serialized in Hakusensha's Young Animal Arashi magazine since February 2014.

The first season of an anime television adaptation premiered on January 7, 2015. The first OVA episode was released on June 22, 2015. The second anime television season premiered on October 9, 2015. A second OVA episode was released on January 26, 2016. A third OVA episode was released on March 28, 2018.

== Plot ==
Basara Tojo is a high school student studying at Hijirigasaka Academy when his father Jin suddenly gets "remarried" and asks Basara if he wants to have sisters. Basara meets his two new, cute stepsisters, Mio Naruse and Maria Naruse. After his father departs overseas, Basara quickly finds that the two sisters are actually part of a demon clan, and he is meant to be with the hero clan. Mio, a Demon princess, forcibly attempts to make a master and servant contract with Basara, but Maria has it end up being the opposite, with Basara as the master. Basara then keeps getting into ecchi scenarios, largely to protect Mio from being pursued by other demons who are after her heritage, which is passed down from the former Demon Lord Wilbert.

== Characters ==
=== Main ===
Basara Toujou (東城 刃更, Toujou Basara)
Voiced by: Yuichi Nakamura (Japanese); Chris Hackney (English)
Basara Tojo is a Year 1 high school student at Hijirigasaka Academy and the protagonist of the story. As a member of a hero clan, he grows up in a hidden rural village. Basara wields the formerly cursed sword Brynhildr. Basara is the only son of Jin Tojo, formerly acknowledged to be the 'Strongest Hero' in the village. As Jin's son, great things are expected of Basara and he is unusually strong even as a youth. Basara possesses the skill 'Banishing Shift', which nullifies any skill directed against him. Five years earlier, when Jin is on a trip, the seal of the S-Ranked 'Evil Spirit' is broken. Many people, including his friends and family, are killed by the spirit. When he sees the Evil Spirit trying to harm his childhood friend, Yuki, his Banishing Shift goes out of control, causing a great crater to form, obliterating the bodies of those slain except Yuki, and also cleansing the area of the evil spirit. Yuki is spared and the cursed sword Brynhildr is cleansed. Because of this, he is confined in the village and when Basara's father returns he insists that Basara be released, which he is, but only on the condition that Jin lose his title as a hero. Jin chooses the release of his son and they move to the city. In the present, Basara's father tells him that he is remarrying and that Basara is going to have two younger stepsisters, Mio and Maria. The four of them move into a new house (since the girls' mother is away overseas) and Jin is soon called away on business. The girls take advantage and try to force Basara to leave the house using magic. However, this backfires and Basara tells them to leave. He then contacts his father who reveals the girls' true nature to Basara and why he took them in. Having decided to protect them as their older brother, and in spite of their deception, Basara goes after the girls and saves Mio's life. As they live together and bond, Basara slowly falls in love with the girls, particularly Mio and Yuki, whom he considers as his weak spot. Maria has Basara and Mio perform a master–slave magical contract that allows them to know each other's location. But, Maria unexpectedly makes Basara the master and Mio the slave, not the other way around and because Maria used Succubus magic to form the contract, the penalty for a disloyal servant is a strong aphrodisiac effect that can only be relieved by the touch of the master, leading to a strong orgasmic release. He has also entered a pact with Yuki in order to boost their fighting strength.

Mio Naruse (成瀬 澪, Naruse Mio)
Voiced by: Ayaka Asai (Japanese); Lauren Landa (English)
Mio, the titular heroine, is a beautiful red-haired Demon princess and heir of the former Demon Lord, Wilbert, as well as niece to the current Moderate Faction leader, Ramsus. She grows up in the care of some of Wilbert's followers ignorant of her heritage. Mio becomes aware of her heritage and inherits her true father's abilities after his death only six months before meeting the Tojo family. She and Maria are hiding from the current Demon Lord Leoheart's minions who want to kill her for the powers that she inherited. This is the reason why Jin Tojo takes Mio and her succubus retainer, Maria, in to protect them and prevent the current Demon Lord from becoming stronger. Mio is not pleased with the results of Maria's bonding spell, and initially sees Basara as a creepy and perverted pest, but she eventually develops feelings for him. However, whenever he accidentally walks in on her naked, she constantly says she will kill him a hundred times, with her usually hitting him with her magic. When she needs to be submitted due to the aphrodisiac effects of the pact, her most sensitive area is her breasts. At the end of the Light Novel series, she is one of the first of Basara's harem to become pregnant with his child and becomes one of his eight wives.

Maria Naruse (成瀬 万理亜, Naruse Maria)
Voiced by: Kaori Fukuhara (Japanese); Kira Buckland (English)
Maria is a succubus and is Mio's follower and guardian. Maria loves Mio like a sister and is willing to give her own life to protect her. However, true to her succubus nature, Maria likes to tease and trick Basara whenever she can, but she genuinely likes him and considers him to be her older brother. Nevertheless she seems to enjoy getting Basara in perverted situations, especially since she is aware of him being in love with Mio. All that leaves him uncomfortable, as she is also responsible for Basara's and Mio's moments alone, involving the two in uncomfortable positions or moments, that may get both naked. Her tricks often get her in trouble and results in Mio punishing her. It is later revealed that she has a much more adult form that is an extreme opposite of her lolita form, being an incredibly seductive adult. She later becomes pregnant with Basara's child along with the rest of his harem and marries him.

Yuki Nonaka (野中 柚希, Nonaka Yūki)
Voiced by: Sarah Emi Bridcutt (Japanese); Xanthe Huynh (season 1), Kayli Mills (season 2) (English)
Yuki is a member of the Hero Tribe and Basara Tojo's childhood friend, who speaks in the Kansai dialect. She is rather calm and serious person, who only shows her more affectionate side to Basara as she has had a crush on him since they were children, to which he also reciprocates. She is one of the observers watching Mio Naruse and is the Class Representative of Basara and Mio's class in Hijirigasaka Academy. Unlike nearly all of the other people in the Hero Tribe, she does not resent Basara regarding the incident five years ago. She holds Basara as the most important thing in her life despite stating that she is looking out for everyone else because she knows that his people have turned on him, not the other way around. Yuki is the sister of Kurumi Nonaka and wields the Spirit Sword, Sakuya. She is the second person to make a master–servant contract with Basara (something she agreed to with no hesitation) and even formed it in the same manner as Mio, with the aphrodisiac effects, and she needs to be submitted (if anything she almost tries to disobey Basara so that she has to submit). It is seen and confirmed by Maria that Yuki's most sensitive spot is her buttocks. She later becomes pregnant with Basara's child along with the rest of his harem and marries him.

Kurumi Nonaka (野中 胡桃, Nonaka Kurumi)
Voiced by: Iori Nomizu (Japanese); Cindy Robinson (English)
Yuki's younger sister and also a member of the Hero Tribe. Kurumi has a hostile attitude towards Basara, but after being saved by Basara during their fight she realizes what Yuki knew all along—that he continues to blame himself for not being able to control his ability which caused the accident five years ago—and develops a crush on him as well. She specializes in summoning spirits. Kurumi's most sensitive spot is her underarms. She later joins Basara's group as the fourth female. Kurumi is the only female aside from Maria to not form a master–servant contract with Basara, but she is the main victim of Maria's sexual games, being frequently manipulated to be subjected by the latter's "succubus baptism" quite a lot in a number of situations; Maria outright states that she is "venting her libido on the poor girl". However, the two of them do genuinely become friends. She later gets pregnant with Basara's child and becomes one of his wives.

Zest (ゼスト, Zesuto)
Voiced by: Seiko Yoshida (Japanese); Jeannie Howard (English)
Another demon, made by Zolgia to be his right hand, sent to keep an eye on Mio alongside Lars, who is originally envious of the pacts that Basara has with Maria, Mio and Yuki, since they care for each other. She later joins Basara's group as the fifth female and third demon girl following Zolgia's defeat and her defection to the Moderate faction. After spending time with Maria's mother, Sheera, Basara discovers that her bust had become considerably larger. She and Basara are convinced by Sheera to make a third master–servant pact, to not only increase their strength but also to protect Zest, who would be in danger should the tension between the demon factions increase. Although Zest was able make a proper master–servant pact with Basara, unlike Mio and Yuki, the aphrodisiac effects of the curse still activate due to Zest's own doubts of her worthiness of being Basara's servant. In contrast to her serious nature during battle, Zest is actually meek and timid on the outside; she sometimes dresses as a maid for Basara and adds the "-sama" honorific to his name. She later marries Basara and becomes the first of the girls who is pregnant with Basara's child.

=== Supporting ===
Jin Tojo (東城 迅, Tojo Jin)
Voiced by: Keiji Fujiwara (Japanese); Kirk Thornton (English)
Jin is Basara's father, and he is also known as the War God. He has two wives - one is a Demon Lord and the other one is an Angel (Nephilim). He knows of and sympathizes with Mio's situation and that is why he decides to protect her. As a foreign correspondent Jin is largely absent from the Tojo home. His strength is so famous that it kept the Demon Lord Wilbert at bay and almost defeated the Demon Lord Leohart.

Yahiro Takigawa (Lars) (滝川 八尋 (ラース), Takigawa Yahiro (Rāsu))
Voiced by: Tomokazu Sugita (Japanese); Ray Chase (English)
A masked Demon sent to spy on Mio who disguises himself as her and Basara's classmate, but after being defeated and nearly killed, he befriends Basara and they form an uneasy alliance. He is capable of creating dolls to take his place and fights using barriers. Mio's foster parents were his caretakers in the orphanage he grew up in, so he agreed to help Basara on the condition he could kill Zolgia himself, to fulfill his wish and avenge his caretakers.

Takashi Hayase (早瀬 高志, Hayase Takashi)
Voiced by: Go Inoue (Japanese); Todd Haberkorn (English)
A member of the Hero Tribe who wields the cursed spear, Byakko. He is Basara's childhood friend, but has resented him since the incident five years ago. He strongly believes that Basara has forgotten the incident and that any who side with a demon needs to be killed.

Chisato Hasegawa (長谷川 千里, Hasegawa Chisato)
Voiced by: Yuu Asakawa (Japanese); Wendee Lee (English)
The school nurse at Hijirigasaka Academy. She is aware of the supernatural things happening around the students and tends to give Basara advice. A wise and caring person, it is revealed that she was Basara's mother's best friend, and they were close enough to be sisters in all but blood. After Basara's mother dies, Hasegawa dedicates her life to protecting Basara. It is also revealed that she is not human but in fact a god, hinting that Basara's mother was one as well, therefore making him a demigod. She later falls in love with Basara and enters into a secret relationship with him. At the end of the series, she marries Basara along with the rest of his harem and she becomes pregnant with Basara's child.

Kyōichi Shiba (芝恭一, Shiba Kyōichi)
Voiced by: Daisuke Hirakawa (Japanese); Brian Beacock (English)
A member of the Hero Tribe who is released from prison to accompany Takashi and Kurumi as a spectator. While very powerful, he respects Basara's ability and desire to protect Mio, Maria, and Yuki, since he is in love with them. Basara states that he is so powerful that if he is a genius then Shiba is over-talented.

Zolgear (ゾルギア, Zorugia)
Voiced by: Hiroto Kazuki (Japanese); Kyle Hebert (English)
The Demon who killed Mio's adoptive parents and Zest's former master, and who plans to turn on Leohart and obtain the Demon King's powers for himself by kidnapping Mio without Leohart's knowledge. After he is defeated, Lars captures, tortures, and finally kills him in the presence of Basara.

Leohart (レオハート, Reohāto)
Voiced by: Kazuyuki Okitsu (Japanese); Kyle McCarley (English)
The current Demon Lord and younger brother of the demon Riara.

Mamoru Sakasaki/Ornis (坂崎 守 / オルニス, Sakazaki Mamoru/Orunisu)
Voiced by: Kenjiro Tsuda (Japanese); Harvey Manfrenjensen (English)
A teacher at Hijirigasaka Academy. Initially assumed to be a human, it is revealed that he is actually a god like Hasegawa. He is intent on killing Basara, who he believes has reached beyond his stature through earning Hasegawa's affection, and believes that killing him will bring Hasegawa back to heaven. After using Kurumi as a hostage to prevent Basara from attacking, he then succeeds in cutting off Basara's sword arm. However, this causes the sword to react and release the spirit of Brynhildr, one of the most powerful Valkyries. In this form Basara's arm grows back, his hair changes color and his right eye glows. He moves so fast that Sakasaki cannot even see him, and he cuts off the top of his foot using Banishing Shift, which he could earlier only use as a counter, not as an attack. Basara attempts to kill Sakasaki but Hasegawa intervenes. She then reveals that she always knew that Ornis has replaced the real Sakasaki. Using her full power, Hasegawa kills Ornis and has Basara take the credit for killing the god.

== Media ==
=== Light novels ===
The first light novel volume was published on September 29, 2012, under Kadokawa Shoten's Kadokawa Sneaker Bunko imprint. The thirteenth and last volume has been published on March 31, 2021.

| No. | Release date | ISBN |
|---|---|---|
| 1 | September 29, 2012 | 978-4-04-100495-1 |
| 2 | January 31, 2013 | 978-4-04-100670-2 |
| 3 | June 1, 2013 | 978-4-04-100860-7 |
| 4 | November 1, 2013 | 978-4-04-101061-7 |
| 5 | April 1, 2014 | 978-4-04-101297-0 |
| 6 | September 1, 2014 | 978-4-04-101433-2 |
| 7 | January 1, 2015 | 978-4-04-102268-9 |
| 8 | July 1, 2015 | 978-4-04-102576-5 |
| 9 | December 1, 2015 | 978-4-04-103747-8 |
| 10 | February 1, 2017 | 978-4-04-103748-5 |
| 11 | November 1, 2017 | 978-4-04-105173-3 |
| 12 | April 1, 2018 | 978-4-04-106815-1 |
| 13 | March 31, 2021 | 978-4-04-107836-5 |

=== Manga ===
A manga adaptation with art by Kashiwa Miyako began serialization in Kadokawa Shoten's shōnen manga magazine Shōnen Ace in the July 2013 issue, released on May 25, 2013. A second manga adaptation, titled Shinmai Maō no Testament: Arashi! (新妹魔王の契約者・嵐！), focusing on the antics of Maria with art by Fumihiro Kiso, began serialization in Hakusensha's seinen manga magazine Young Animal Arashi on February 7, 2014. Both series have been licensed for publication in North America by Seven Seas Entertainment.

=== Anime ===
An anime television adaptation premiered on January 7, 2015. The opening theme is "Blade of Hope" by sweet ARMS and the ending theme is "Still Sis" by Kaori Sadohara. A second season titled The Testament of Sister New Devil BURST premiered on October 9, 2015. Crunchyroll streamed the series, with Funimation handling the home video release. Anime Limited released the series in the UK.

== China ban ==
On June 12, 2015, the Chinese Ministry of Culture listed The Testament of Sister New Devil among 38 anime and manga titles banned in China.

== See also ==
- Aesthetica of a Rogue Hero, another series by the same author
- High School DxD
