= Shiyakusho =

Japanese manga series

- First tankōbon volume cover

死役所
- Manga
- Written by: Kishi Azumi
- Published by: Shinchosha
- Magazine: Monthly Comic @Bunch (2013–18); Monthly Comic Bunch (2018–2024); Comic Bunch Kai (2024–present)
- Original run: September 21, 2013 – present
- Volumes: 28
- Television drama
- Directed by: Hiroaki Yuasa; Takayoshi Tanasawa; Mai Sakai; Hana Matsumoto; Masatoshi Kurakata
- Written by: Yosuke Masachi; Kisa Miura; Karasuma Jujube
- Studio: Drama Design; J Storm
- Original network: TV Tokyo
- Original run: October 17, 2019 – December 19, 2019
- Episodes: 10
- Original net animation
- Written by: Eiji Mano
- Music by: Yutaka Shinya
- Studio: Typhoon Graphics
- Released: February 9, 2022
- Runtime: 11 minutes
- icon

Shiyakusho (死役所; 'Death Bureau') is a Japanese manga series written and illustrated by Kishi Azumi. It started in Shinchosha's seinen manga magazine Monthly Comic @Bunch in September 2013, which was later renamed Monthly Comic Bunch in 2018 and relaunched as the web magazine Comic Bunch Kai in 2024. A television drama adaptation aired on TV Tokyo from October to December 2019, and an original net animation (ONA) adaptation produced by Typhoon Graphics was released on YouTube in February 2022.

== Synopsis ==
Set in the "Death Bureau", which exists at the boundary between the living world and the afterlife, Shiyakusho depicts people who die in various ways. Modeled after administrative offices in the living world, the Death Bureau has departments dedicated to specific causes of death, such as suicide, homicide, illness, and accidents. The deceased must submit the necessary paperwork and complete the required procedures within 49 days.

The series primarily unfolds in self-contained stories, each revealing the life events and conflicts of a specific deceased person. The staff members, including Masamichi from the general information desk and Miwako from the Suicide Division, are former death row inmates. Through their conversations with deceased visitors, the essence of humanity and social problems are highlighted.

== Characters ==
Masamichi (シ村) / Masamichi Shimura (市村 正道, Shimura Masamichi)
Voiced by: Takehito Koyasu
Portrayed by: Masahiro Matsuoka
Miwako (ニシ川) / Miwako Nishikawa (西川 実和子, Nishikawa Miwako)
Portrayed by: Marika Matsumoto
Ishima (イシ間)
Voiced by: Binbin Takaoka
Rin Onoda (小野田 凛, Onoda Rin)
Voiced by: Makoto Koichi

== Media ==
=== Manga ===
Written and illustrated by Kishi Azumi, Shiyakusho started in Shinchosha's seinen manga magazine Monthly Comic @Bunch on September 21, 2013. Monthly Comic @Bunch changed its name to Monthly Comic Bunch starting on April 21, 2018; it was relaunched as the web magazine Comic Bunch Kai on April 26, 2024. Shinchosha has collected its chapters into individual tankōbon volumes. The first volume was released on April 9, 2014. As of July 9, 2025, 28 volumes have been released.

==== Volumes ====
No.	Japanese release date	Japanese ISBN
1	April 9, 2014	978-4-10-771741-2
2	September 9, 2014	978-4-10-771771-9
3	March 9, 2015	978-4-10-771804-4
4	September 9, 2015	978-4-10-771842-6
5	February 9, 2016	978-4-10-771875-4
6	July 9, 2016	978-4-10-771904-1
7	December 9, 2016	978-4-10-771941-6
8	March 9, 2017	978-4-10-771964-5
9	August 9, 2017	978-4-10-771964-5
10	January 9, 2018	978-4-10-772042-9
11	June 9, 2018	978-4-10-772091-7
12	November 9, 2018	978-4-10-772135-8
13	April 9, 2019	978-4-10-772177-8
14	October 9, 2019	978-4-10-772223-2
15	February 7, 2020	978-4-10-772259-1
16	June 9, 2020	978-4-10-772294-2
17	November 9, 2020	978-4-10-772339-0
18	April 9, 2021	978-4-10-772380-2
19	September 9, 2021	978-4-10-772428-1
20	February 9, 2022	978-4-10-772474-8
21	July 7, 2022	978-4-10-772517-2
22	December 8, 2022	978-4-10-772552-3
23	May 9, 2023	978-4-10-772600-1
24	October 6, 2023	978-4-10-772658-2
25	April 9, 2024	978-4-10-772706-0
26	September 9, 2024	978-4-10-772751-0
27	February 7, 2025	978-4-10-772798-5
28	July 9, 2025	978-4-10-772852-4

=== Drama ===
A ten-episode television drama adaptation was broadcast on TV Tokyo from October 17 to December 19, 2019. (Note: TV Tokyo the air dates for the series on Wednesday at 24:12, which is effectively Thursday at 0:12 a.m. JST.)

=== Original net animation ===
An 11-minute original net animation (ONA), animated by Typhoon Graphics in cooperation with Frontier Works, was posted on YouTube on February 9, 2022.

== Reception ==
By February 2022, the manga had over 4.5 million copies in circulation. The manga placed fifth in Rakuten Kobo's second E-book Award in the "Long Seller Comic" category in 2024.
