= Dahlia in Bloom =

Japanese light novel series

- Dahlia in Bloom: Crafting a Fresh Start with Magical Tools
- Cover of the first light novel volume

魔導具師ダリヤはうつむかない ～今日から自由な職人ライフ～ (Madōgushi Dariya wa Utsumukanai: Kyō kara Jiyū na Shokunin Raifu)
- Genre: Isekai, Slice of life
- Novel series
- Written by: Hisaya Amagishi
- Published by: Shōsetsuka ni Narō
- Original run: April 1, 2018 – present
- Light novel
- Written by: Hisaya Amagishi
- Illustrated by: Kei (Vol. 1–8); Hachi Komada (Vol. 9–13); Shima (SS)
- Published by: Media Factory
- English publisher: NA: J-Novel Club
- Imprint: MF Books
- Original run: October 25, 2018 – present
- Volumes: 14 + 1 side story collection
- Manga
- Written by: Hisaya Amagishi
- Illustrated by: Kamada
- Published by: Kadokawa Shoten
- Magazine: Comp Ace
- Original run: April 26, 2019 – February 26, 2020
- Volumes: 2
- Manga

Magic Artisan Dahlia Wilts No More
- Written by: Hisaya Amagishi
- Illustrated by: Megumi Sumikawa
- Published by: Mag Garden
- English publisher: NA: Seven Seas Entertainment
- Magazine: Mag Comi
- Original run: April 25, 2019 – present
- Volumes: 9
- Light novel

Lucia and the Loom: Weaving Her Way to Happiness
- Written by: Hisaya Amagishi
- Illustrated by: Esora Amaichi
- Published by: Media Factory
- English publisher: NA: J-Novel Club
- Imprint: MF Books
- Original run: April 24, 2021 – present
- Volumes: 3
- Manga

Lucia and the Loom: Weaving Her Way to Happiness
- Written by: Hisaya Amagishi
- Illustrated by: Kine Usuto
- Published by: Frontier Works
- Magazine: FW Comics Alter
- Original run: February 18, 2022 – present
- Volumes: 5
- Anime television series
- Directed by: Yōsuke Kubo
- Written by: Yuichiro Higashide
- Music by: Kow Otani
- Studio: Typhoon Graphics; Imagica Infos
- Licensed by: Crunchyroll
- Original network: AT-X, MBS, Tokyo MX, BS11
- Original run: July 6, 2024 – September 21, 2024
- Episodes: 12
- Light novel

Jonas the Guardian Knight Will Not Look Back: Scalfarot's Demonic Oath
- Written by: Hisaya Amagishi
- Illustrated by: Hachi Komada
- Published by: Media Factory
- Imprint: MF Books
- Original run: September 25, 2025 – present
- Volumes: 1
- icon

Dahlia in Bloom: Crafting a Fresh Start with Magical Tools (Japanese: 魔導具師ダリヤはうつむかない ～今日から自由な職人ライフ～, Hepburn: Madōgushi Dariya wa Utsumukanai: Kyō kara Jiyū na Shokunin Raifu) is a Japanese light novel series written by Hisaya Amagishi. The series originated on the Shōsetsuka ni Narō website in April 2018, before being published in print by Media Factory with illustrations by Kei beginning in October 2018. Thirteen volumes have been released. Two manga adaptations, illustrated by Kamada and Megumi Sumikawa, respectively, began serialization in the Comp Ace magazine and Mag Comi website in April 2019. The first series completed serialization in February 2020 with its chapters collected into two volumes, whereas the second series, titled Magic Artisan Dahlia Wilts No More, has been published in nine volumes. An anime television series adaptation produced by Typhoon Graphics and Imagica Infos aired from July to September 2024.

In April 2021, a spin-off light novel series following Dahlia's friend Lucia began publication, titled Lucia and the Loom: Weaving Her Way to Happiness, with illustration by Esora Amaichi. Three volumes have been published. A manga adaptation of the spin-off, illustrated by Kine Usuto, began serialization on the FW Comics Alter website in February 2022. Five volumes have been published.

In September 2025, a second spin-off light novel, titled Jonas the Guardian Knight Will Not Look Back: Scalfarot's Demonic Oath, with illustration by Hachi Komada began publication. A single volume has been published.

== Premise ==
An overworked office worker is reincarnated as Dahlia, the daughter of a magic device inventor. When grown up, she is told by her fiancée Tobias that he has found his true love and wishes to annul their engagement the day before their ceremony. She complies without complaint, realizing she has no feelings of romantic love for him; instead focusing on her craft and business.

While in masculine disguise, Dahlia meets an injured Wolfred on the side of the road and their relationship begins.

== Characters ==
Dahlia Rossetti (ダリヤ・ロセッティ, Dariya・Rosetti)
Voiced by: Saori Ōnishi
A former office worker, now genius magic device craftsman, Dahlia adores inventive magic and her father. In her past life, Dahlia had her spirit crushed by overwork. After her reincarnation, she finds great enthusiasm for this new life, joy in inventing, and figuring out how to make people's lives easier. Slowly, after the announcement of her arranged marriage to Tobias, Dahlia finds herself back to hanging her head and doing as she is told. In part, this is due to Tobias's abuse and her father's death. After the annulment, in which she refuses to give Tobias a loan when he asks for it, Dahlia's friends help her start a firm under the name Rossetti.
Dahlia is seemingly immune to Wolf's magical attractiveness which makes other girls swoon.
Wolfred Scalfarotto (ヴォルフレード・スカルファロット, Borufurēdo・Sukarufarotto)
Voiced by: Atsushi Tamaru
A beast hunter knight whom Dahlia helped recover after he was dropped by a wyvern. He is cursed with good looks that make him easily recognizable and desirable.
An example given is when he rejects an offer of a new friend's significant other it led to a lie that he had come onto them, destroying the relationship with his friend. He cares deeply for Dahlia, but can be naïve at times at what his wealth and status really mean, even if he does not want to be treated differently.
Wolfred was born of his father's third wife, a knight, whom died protecting his elder half brother and stepmother.
Guido Scalfarotto (グイード・スカルファロット, Guido・Sukarufarotto)
Voiced by: Kensho Ono
Wolfred's older half-brother.
Irma Nuvolari (イルマ・ヌヴォラーリ, Iruma・Nuvuorāri)
Voiced by: Riho Iida
Marcella Nuvolari (マルチェラ・ヌヴォラーリ, Maruchera・Nuvuorāri)
Voiced by: Kenichirou Matsuda
Lucia Fano (ルチア・ファーノ, Ruchia・Fāno)
Voiced by: Fūka Izumi
Ivano Badoer (イヴァーノ・バドエル, Ivuāno・Badoeru)
Voiced by: Hiroki Takahashi
Gabriella Jedda (ガブリエラ・ジェッダ, Gaburiera・Jedda)
Voiced by: Yuriko Yamaguchi
Carlo Rossetti (カルロ・ロセッティ, Karuro・Rosetti)
Voiced by: Ken Narita
Dahlia's deceased father. Prior to his death, Carlo helped Dahlia create many of her earlier tools, due to her being unable to fine tune them as a child. He arranged for Tobias to marry Dahlia to keep her away from men who would take advantage of her; unfortunately, Tobias became just that due to his fragile ego. Dahlia notes that, if Carlo is aware beyond the graves, he would be heavily disappointed in Tobias; not only for how he acts, but for trying to steal credit on a patent.
Tobias Orlando (トビアス・オルランド, Tobiasu・Orurando)
Voiced by: Tomohiro Ōno
Dahlia's former fiancée and junior craftsman disciple. He left her for 'his true love' Emilia Tullini. Tobias lacks mindset to invent magic devices himself, specializing in smooth magic application and attaching instead. Being deeply unsatisfied and jealous of Dahlia, he asks her to change herself and not to stand out so much. He also planned to steal credit for her work once they were married, and make her dependent on him. Later, Tobias learns from his brother later on that he was not entrusted with Dahlia by her father when the marriage was arranged; rather he was meant to protect Dahlia, due her genius being a target for others.
Emilia Tullini
The illegitimate daughter of a noble and a recently hired secretary at the Orlando Firm. Emilia is seemingly unkind, distributing her belongings in Dahlia's personal furniture and possibly sleeping in Dahlia's bed with Tobias, on the night of the annulment. She later loudly apologizes to Dahlia in public in an attempt to make Dahlia look bad due to feelings of jealousy towards her. Tobias tried to cover for Emilia by lying, claiming that Dahlia blamed Emilia.

== Media ==
=== Light novel ===
Written by Hisaya Amagishi, the series began publication on the novel posting website Shōsetsuka ni Narō on April 1, 2018. The series was later acquired by Media Factory, who began publishing the series in print with illustrations by Kei on October 25, 2018. As of September 2026, fourteen volumes and one short stories volume have been released. Hachi Komada replaced Kei as illustrator starting with volume 9. Shima provided the illustrations for the side stories volume.

In July 2021, J-Novel Club announced that they licensed the series for English publication.

==== Volumes ====
No.	Original release date	Original ISBN	English release date	English ISBN
1	October 25, 2018	978-4-04-065307-5	September 27, 2021	978-1-71-838098-1
2	April 25, 2019	978-4-04-065634-2	November 19, 2021	978-1-71-838100-1
3	September 25, 2019	978-4-04-064059-4	March 28, 2022	978-1-71-838102-5
4	February 25, 2020	978-4-04-064454-7	July 25, 2022	978-1-71-838104-9
5	September 25, 2020	978-4-04-064941-2	November 16, 2022	978-1-71-838106-3
6	April 24, 2021	978-4-04-680376-4	February 27, 2023	978-1-71-838108-7
7	October 25, 2021	978-4-04-680836-3	May 29, 2023	978-1-71-838110-0
8	June 24, 2022	978-4-04-681176-9	December 25, 2023	978-1-71-838112-4
9	December 25, 2023	978-4-04-681932-1	March 31, 2025	978-1-71-838114-8
SS	March 25, 2024	978-4-04-683144-6	June 23, 2025	978-1-71-838116-2
10	June 25, 2024	978-4-04-683712-7	September 25, 2025	978-1-71-838118-6
11	November 25, 2024	978-4-04-683820-9; 978-4-04-683821-6 (SE)	December 30, 2025	978-1-71-838120-9
12	March 24, 2025	978-4-04-684648-8; 978-4-04-684649-5 (SE)	June 18, 2026	978-1-71-838122-3
13	January 23, 2026	978-4-04-685536-7; 978-4-04-685537-4 (SE)	October 5, 2026	978-1-71-838124-7
14	September 25, 2026	978-4-04-660332-6	—	—
15	October 23, 2026	978-4-04-660334-0	—	—

==== Spin-offs ====
===== Lucia and the Loom =====
A spin-off series following Dahlia's friend Lucia, titled Lucia and the Loom: Weaving Her Way to Happiness (服飾師ルチアはあきらめない ～今日から始める幸服計画～, Fukushoku-shi Lucia wa Akiramenai ~Kyou kara Hajimeru Koufuku Keikaku~), with illustration by Esora Amaichi began publication on April 24, 2021. Three volumes have been published as of December 2023. In May 2023, J-Novel Club announced they had licensed the spin-off light novel series.

No.	Original release date	Original ISBN	English release date	English ISBN
1	April 24, 2021	978-4-04-680375-7	September 11, 2023	978-1-71-838136-0
2	January 25, 2022	978-4-04-681093-9	October 10, 2024	978-1-71-838138-4
3	December 25, 2023	978-4-04-683146-0; 978-4-04-683143-9 (SE)	February 24, 2025	978-1-71-838140-7

===== Jonas the Guardian Knight =====
A second spin-off series titled Jonas the Guardian Knight Will Not Look Back: Scalfarot's Demonic Oath (護衛騎士ヨナスはふりむかない ～スカルファロットの魔付きの誓い～), with illustration by Hachi Komada began publication on September 25, 2025.

No.	Japanese release date	Japanese ISBN
1	September 25, 2025	978-4-04-684984-7

=== Manga ===
A manga adaptation, illustrated by Kamada, began serialization in Kadokawa Shoten's Comp Ace magazine on April 26, 2019. It completed serialization on February 26, 2020. The series' individual chapters were collected into two tankōbon volumes.

Another manga adaptation, titled Magic Artisan Dahlia Wilts No More and illustrated by Megumi Sumikawa, began serialization on Mag Garden's Mag Comi website on April 25, 2019. As of March 2026, the series' individual chapters have been collected into nine tankōbon volumes. In September 2021, Seven Seas Entertainment announced that they licensed the series for English publication.

==== Volumes ====
===== First series =====
No.	Japanese release date	Japanese ISBN
1	September 25, 2019	978-4-04-108681-0
2	July 21, 2020	978-4-04-109729-8

===== Second series =====
No.	Original release date	Original ISBN	English release date	English ISBN
1	September 25, 2019	978-4-80-000897-8	April 19, 2022	978-1-63-858199-4
2	February 25, 2020	978-4-80-000943-2	July 5, 2022	978-1-63-858341-7
3	January 9, 2021	978-4-80-001043-8	October 11, 2022	978-1-63-858718-7
4	October 25, 2021	978-4-80-001141-1; 978-4-80-001136-7 (SE)	February 28, 2023	978-1-63-858968-6
5	September 9, 2022	978-4-80-001242-5	August 22, 2023	978-1-68579-570-2
6	August 31, 2023	978-4-80-001364-4	September 17, 2024	979-8-88843-368-3
7	July 10, 2024	978-4-80-001470-2; 978-4-80-001467-2 (SE)	March 18, 2025	979-8-89373-264-1
8	May 10, 2025	978-4-80-001595-2	March 31, 2026	979-8-89561-688-8
9	March 10, 2026	978-4-80-001714-7	—	—

==== Spin-offs ====
===== Lucia and the Loom =====
A manga adaptation of the spin-off series Lucia and the Loom: Weaving Her Way to Happiness (服飾師ルチアはあきらめない ～今日から始める幸服計画～, Fukushoku-shi Lucia wa Akiramenai ~Kyou kara Hajimeru Koufuku Keikaku~) began serialization on Frontier Works' FW Comics Alter website on February 18, 2022, with Kine Usuto illustrating. The first tankōbon volume was released November 18, 2022. The series' individual chapters have been collected into five volumes as of July 2025.

No.	Japanese release date	Japanese ISBN
1	November 18, 2022	978-4-86657-612-1
2	April 18, 2023	978-4-86657-646-6
3	December 25, 2023	978-4-86657-722-7
4	July 18, 2024	978-4-86657-784-5
5	July 18, 2025	978-4-86657-843-9
6	March 18, 2026	978-4-86657-931-3

=== Anime ===
An anime television series adaptation was announced during the 10th anniversary livestream of the MF Books light novel imprint in August 2023. It is produced by Typhoon Graphics and Imagica Infos, directed by Yōsuke Kubo, written by Yuichiro Higashide, character designed by Satomi Kurita, and composed by Kow Otani. The series aired from July 6 to September 21, 2024, on AT-X and other networks. The opening theme song is "Chiisana Tsubomi" (ちいさな蕾) performed by Nako Misaki, while the ending theme song is "Glitter" performed by Marina Horiuchi. Crunchyroll is streaming the series worldwide except Asia.

In April 2024, a report from 38 North revealed that material from the anime adaptation was discovered on a server being used by a North Korean animation studio, most likely SEK Studio. In June, an investigation by Typhoon Graphics confirmed that a subcontractor based in China may have subcontracted work to North Korea without informing them. They also said that any scenes suspected to have been animated in North Korea would be redone.

==== Episodes ====
No.	Title	Directed by (Note: Production staff information is taken from the ending credits of each episode)	Written by	Storyboarded by	Original release date
1	"Dahlia's Dream"; Transliteration: "Dariya no Yume" (Japanese: ダリヤの夢)	Masato Uchibori	Yuichiro Higashide	Yōsuke Kubo	July 6, 2024
After overworking herself to death, a Japanese salarywoman is reborn in an alternate world as Dahlia, the daughter of Carlo Rossetti, a magic device craftsman. From an early age, Dahlia is entranced by magic devices and decides to one day become a craftswoman herself. Carlo is impressed with the drawings Dahlia makes of modern Japanese technology adapted to work with magic. Dahlia's friend, Irma, hopes to be a hair stylist one day, so Dahlia decides her very first device will be a hairdryer powered by wind and fire magic stones. However, in her haste, she ignores Carlo's warning not to attempt to build it until she has had more training and she sets fire to the workshop. With Carlo's help, they complete a working hairdryer together, though Carlo is severely scolded by their maid Sophia for allowing a child of Dahlia's age to work all night without stopping. Many years later, Dahlia's skills have improved considerably, but feels she is not yet ready to tackle crafting a fairy crystal light, a notoriously difficult device to craft. Carlo considers taking on another apprentice, but hesitates as he is unsure how Dahlia might react.
2	"Memories Of Being With Carlo"; Transliteration: "Karuro to Issho ni Ita Omoide" (Japanese: カルロと一緒にいた思い出)	Xu Chenfeng	Makoto Nakamura	Masato Sato	July 13, 2024
Carlo hires Tobias Orlando, an apprentice craftsman and heir to the Orlando Trading Company. Later, Carlo and Tobias get caught in the rain and Dahlia is inspired to craft a raincoat since the animal skin cloaks most people use aren't very waterproof and tend to smell. Her solution is to craft a water repellent fabric from slime monsters with help from Carlo and Tobias. After registering the patent for the fabric under her own name, they are instantly swamped with orders and require substantial help from the Orlando Company. Tobias' father privately reveals to Carlo that he is terminally ill, leading Carlo to confess that he is also unwell and doesn't have much time left. This leads to their decision to push Dahlia and Tobias to marry, ensuring their successful futures and protecting each other. Dahlia eventually agrees and becomes engaged to Tobias, though it is clear she doesn't love him but respects him as a businessman and a craftsman. Immediately, Tobias becomes critical of Dahlia, pressuring her to dress differently and change her appearance and behaviour so as not to embarrass him. Tobias' father dies soon afterwards and Carlo steps in to help Tobias manage the company, but the stress worsens Carlo's own health and he passes away soon after.
3	"True Love?"; Transliteration: "Shin no ai?" (Japanese: 真の愛？)	Masato Uchibori	Nagisa Naruo	Tomotaka Okada	July 20, 2024
Shortly after Carlo's death, Tobias suddenly ends their engagement, having fallen in love with Emilia, a receptionist at his trading company. During the formal cancellation of their engagement and Dahlia's business partnership with the Orlando Trading Company, Dahlia receives gold but loses her part ownership of the house she and Orlando built together to marry in. To add insult to injury, Dahlia discovers Emilia had already moved her own possessions into the house and had sex with Tobias in Dahlia's bed mere hours after the engagement was ended. Dahlia moves back into Carlo's tower outside of town and almost succumbs to depression as she did in her previous life, but she realises that, in this life, she has both friends and business contacts who care about her wellbeing, and quickly recovers her cheerful self, starting with resuming her former style of dress and hair colour which Tobias forced her to change. Dahlia discovers Emilia is the illegitimate daughter of Viscount Tallini and likely stole Tobias from Dahlia to get access to his money and trading company. Deciding to have some fun, Dahlia disguises herself as a man to go travelling, but in the wilderness she encounters a wounded knight and helps him recover. The knight turns out to be Wolfred of the Monster Suppression Squad who works directly for the King.
4	"An Encounter with a Knight"; Transliteration: "Kishi to no Deai" (Japanese: 騎士との出会い)	Shigeki Awai	Yuichiro Higashide	Shinichi Watanabe	July 27, 2024
The two make camp so Wolfred can wash out the monster blood in his clothing. Learning Dahlia is an artificer Wolfred asks if she has ever made a magic sword, which she hasn't since weapons require either mages or alchemists. Wolfred explains there are only a few magic swords in the world, most of which are relics since the swords can only be used by certain people and the exact criteria by which a sword chooses its user are unknown. They return to the city and go their separate ways. Dahlia discovers Tobias patented one of her best selling devices under his own name. While discussing the matter Tobias feels slighted that she never felt any real affection for him, so he gives back the patent but breaks off her partnership with the Orlando company to ruin her business. Outraged by Tobias' behaviour other merchants urge Dahlia to simply register herself as the Rosseti Trading Company, with Guild Master Jedder even agreeing to act as a guarantor for the bank loan she would need. Vice Chairwoman Gabriella helps Dahlia begin to act like a Chairwoman, which will be essential for business negotiations as she had promised Carlo to help Dahlia when necessary. Meanwhile, Wolfred refuses to be rewarded for slaying a wyvern and instead takes a leave of absence to go and thank Dahlia for her help, still under the impression she is a man.
5	"Father's Gift"; Transliteration: "Chichi no Okurimono" (Japanese: 父の贈り物)	Sachi Miura	Makoto Nakamura	Sachi Miura	August 3, 2024
Wolfred locates Dahlia and realises she is a woman but is unconcerned and treats her to lunch. They are approached by an embarrassed Tobias and Emilia who apologises to Dahlia for taking Tobias from her. Wolfred introduces himself, shocking Tobias that Dahlia is with not only a royal knight but the son of Lord Scalfaratto, the Earl of Water. Having been interrupted Dahlia and Wolfred move to another restaurant for more privacy. As the youngest son with no magical ability Wolfred expects to be disinherited and so is focusing on his army career. From their conversation Dahlia theorises a way of placing multiple spells on one sword without requiring a mage or alchemist. Wolfred invites Dahlia to the Goddessess Right Eye, a magic device shop catering exclusively to the nobility. Gabriella is intrigued by Dahlia spending time with a famous noble. The shop is run by the artificer Baron Oswald Zola, an old school friend of Carlo. Oswald owed a great debt to Carlo who inspired him to craft an air cooling device that made him famous and saved his shop from bankruptcy. As repayment he offers Dahlia shop membership despite not being nobility, which she accepts. Having met Oswald Dahlia realises how much she misses Carlo and cries while Wolfred comforts her.
6	"Fairy Crystal Eyeglasses"; Transliteration: "Yōsei Kesshō no Megane" (Japanese: 妖精結晶の眼鏡)	Masato Uchibori	Nagisa Naruo	Masato Sato	August 10, 2024
Dahlia and Wolfred visit the market, with Wolfred giving her a ring to protect against poison, just in case his enemies have poisoned their food. Dahlia is accosted by a pervert but defends herself with an ice magic device. Over supper they both claim to have no interest in romance and will be good friends from now on. Wolfred confesses to hating his golden eyes which cause him nothing but trouble by attracting ladies, many of whom already have husbands. Dahlia combines Fairy Glass with his spectacles. The results are spectacles that turn his eyes green, for which he is grateful as he can now go out without a disguise. Tobias' older brother Ireneo accepts his claim of loving Emilia but warns him as an illegitimate daughter her noble relatives could make life difficult. He also reveals the real reason their father and Carlo wanted them to marry; the Orlando's could stop unscrupulous people from taking advantage of Dahlia's genius, while Dahlia's abilities would hide Tobias' lack of ability as long as they always created devices together. Tobias cries on realising how big a mistake he made. As payment for the spectacles Wolfred gives Dahlia a legal document allowing her to treat him as an equal despite his noble status. Dahlia plans to design a magic sword next.
7	"A Premonition of Pandemonium"; Transliteration: "Pandemoniumu no Yokan" (Japanese: パンデモニウムの予感)	Ippei Ichii	Yuichiro Higashide	Kana Kawana	August 17, 2024
Wolfred's men notice something has changed as he is less prone to suicidal attacks. His superiors consider promoting him. He returns and finds Dahlia inventing a fridge/freezer. He gives her wine glasses as a gift but the expense makes her uncomfortable so she accepts them as payment for his spectacles. Dahlia starts work on a magic sword. Most magic swords only have one ability, but Dahlia theorises that by treating the blade, guard, hilt and scabbard as four separate objects she can give one sword four abilities. Unfortunately the separate magics reject each other. Dahlia decides to use powdered black slimes to insulate the magics from each other, but the sword becomes too acidic to hold even wearing gloves. Dahlia plans to have it disposed of but Wolfred convinces her to keep it since they made it together. As his next mission is in swamplands Dahlia asks him to test socks that keep feet dry and prevent foot fungus. Wolfred's friend, the widowed Lady Althea, is certain he is falling in love but finds it more amusing to let him realise on his own. Wolfreds socks are so successful his men and even his superiors demand to know where to get anti-fungus socks. Wolfred fears this will cause Dahlia a lot of unwanted attention.
8	"The Rossetti Company"; Transliteration: "Rosetti Shōkai" (Japanese: ロセッティ商会)	Daigo Taniguchi	Makoto Nakamura	Yōsuke Kubo	August 24, 2024
Dahlia is shocked to receive a proposal to supply all the Suppression Squads socks. Dahlia asks Gabriella for help who arranges to hire an assistant from the Clothing Guild. Wolfred volunteers as a guarantor but is told that as a noble forming a business relationship he must inform his Lord father. The deal becomes complicated as the Trade Guild makes plans for mass production plus the Adventurers Guild are hired to hunt the green slimes the socks are made from. Afterwards, Fortunato resigns from the Trade Guild, revealing to Gabriella he took part in the negotiation with Dahlia's best interest in mind and not the Trade Guilds; as another of Dahlia's guarantors this was a huge conflict of interest. Gabriella accepts he was only protecting Dahlia but insists he ask Dahlia to hire him. Wolfred also agrees to recommend Dahlia hire him. Tobias' brother Ireneo requests Dahlia form a new business partnership between their companies. Dahlia agrees but asks them to supply her with fairy crystals. Honouring a promise he made to Carlo Ireneo also gives her what should have been a wedding present; a female unicorn horn with healing properties. Wolfred unhappily attends a meeting with his brother Guido.
9	"Beyond the Nightmare"; Transliteration: "Akumu o Koete" (Japanese: 悪夢を越えて)	Shigeki Awai	Nagisa Naruo	Shinichi Watanabe	August 31, 2024
Guido worries Wolfred is preparing to cut ties with the family by becoming financially independent. Wolfred knows this comes from Guido's guilt over the death of Wolfred's mother Vanessa, who died defending Guido and his mother from bandits. Guido tries to apologise but Wolfred refuses to accept as it would lessen Vanessa's sacrifice. Guido and Wolfred confess they both have nightmares of that day, though Guido jokes that marriage makes them bearable. Wolfred is surprised to learn his father still visits Vanessa's grave regularly. After they part Wolfred realises he hasn't had the nightmare since meeting Dahlia. Dahlia continues making deals, arranging for a local workshop to mass produce hand soap pump bottles and is even thrilled when their representative Fermo suggests design improvements. As such, she negotiates for Fermo to be her co-developer, entitling him to share the profits. Wolfred visits Dahlia and finds her recovering from injuries. He fears she was attacked by someone but is relieved she merely hurt herself working, though he grows upset she is only using the unicorn horn to reduce her pain instead of seeking treatment. He becomes interested in a failed bracelet she made that throws the wearer backwards if they use magic. As he has no magic he wonders what might happen if he wears it.
10	"An Invitation to the Palace"; Transliteration: "Ojō E no Shōtai" (Japanese: 王城への招待)	Tomotaka Okada	Nagisa Naruo	Masato Sato	September 7, 2024
They discover that without magic the bracelet only amplifies his physical abilities, allowing him to jump incredibly high. Wolfred still worries about her safety but she reveals her gates magically prevent anyone entering unless invited. At his request Dahlia registers Wolfred on the gate, just in case she injures herself again and can't let him in. Wolfred begins tutoring her on noble etiquette but is embarrassed when she naively recites phrases nobles would consider daringly suggestive. Over dinner Dahlia is further inspired and by altering her hairdryer creates a device to dry soldiers wet boots without damaging the leather. Fearing a repeat of the demand for her socks Dahlia takes all her new designs to Ivano who agrees to organise everything properly. However, he warns her against telling anyone about her magic sword experiments as it could have dangerous implications for the military and inter-kingdom politics if magic swords could suddenly be mass produced. Dahlia asks Gabriella to forgive whatever debt Carlo owed. Gabriella is amused, revealing it was a debt of favours, not money, and she intends to hold on to it by helping Dahlia as long as she can. Wolfred's superiors, Vice-captain Grizelda and Captain Grat, suddenly invite Dahlia to a gathering at the palace. Knowing she will be meeting royalty Gabriella spends 24 hours organising clothes, hair, makeup and etiquette.
11	"Blossoms Opening Towards The Sky"; Transliteration: "Sora Ni Mukatte Hiraku Hana" (Japanese: 空に向かって開く花)	Sachi Miura	Makoto Nakamura	Sachi Miura	September 14, 2024
Arriving at the castle Dahlia meets the Suppression Squad and provides ways of stopping their foot fungus spreading. Wolfred unintentionally upsets Dahlia by suggesting her expertise comes from having foot fungus herself, so she leaves angry. Wolfred's superiors scold him and demand he atone with a gift. Being clueless about what she likes Wolfred leaves in a hurry and his superiors bemoan the foolishness of men in love. Arriving at her home with flowers and sweets she eventually forgives him. He learns she likes cheesecake and flowers with strong scents. Over dinner he tells her about Disasradu; a soldiers tradition of getting drunk and admitting secrets which are never to be talked about again. As they are already drinking Dahlia agrees to play and reveals her mother abandoned Carlo after giving birth to her and married another man but died 10 years later. Wolfred reveals his mother Vanessa was his father's third wife but his father showed no interest in him when he was born without magic. His desire for a magic sword comes from wanting to surpass Vanessa, who had powerful ice magic. Dahlia admits she has trouble asking for help, even though she has a recurring nightmare of dying alone at her desk. Wolfred promises to save her the next time she has a nightmare, amusing her as it is impossible to save someone inside their own dreams.
12	"Dahlia in Bloom"; Transliteration: "Madōgushi Dariya wa Utsumukanai" (Japanese: 魔導具師ダリヤはうつむかない)	Yōsuke Kubo	Yuichiro Higashide	Yōsuke Kubo	September 21, 2024
Dahlia attempts to make another sword using yellow earth slime but it is another failure. She realises earth magic can neutralise acid, so she coats the failed black slime sword in yellow slime powder. With the acid neutralized the sword becomes safe to use. The sword suddenly begins moving and Dahlia puts it away in case a lost soul has possessed it. During an experiment with a Mirror Snake scale Dahlia and Wolfred share a hallucination of dancing. Dahlia realises the scale might actually be from a Rainbow Snake, meaning they saw the future. Gabriella asks Dahlia about marriage but Dahlia claims to be uninterested. Suspecting this is untrue Gabriella conspires with Fortunato; to marry an Earls son Dahlia must become either an official supplier to the royal family or be made a Baroness. Dahlia hosts a party to thank Irma, Lucia and Marcella for their help. Dahlia and Wolfred visit Carlo and Vanessa's graves respectively. Wolfred tells Vanessa about Dahlia and his goals to surpass her and protect Dahlia. Dahlia thanks Carlo for being a good father and teacher and is determined to become as great a craftsman as he was. The two leave together, still discussing what to do with their unusual sword.

== Reception ==
Sean Gaffney from A Case Suitable for Treatment praised the characters and romance, though he felt the story was a bit generic. Rebecca Silverman from Anime News Network praised the illustrations and main characters, though she criticized a "lack of authorial focus".

In the Kono Light Novel ga Sugoi! guidebook's tankōbon and novel category, the series ranked ninth in 2021 and 2022, second in 2023, and first in 2025.

The series has over 3.4 million copies in circulation.
