= Takehito Koyasu =

Japanese voice actor (born 1967)

- 子安 武人
- Born: May 5, 1967 (age 59); Yokohama, Kanagawa Prefecture, Japan
- Occupation: Voice actor
- Years active: 1988–present
- Agent: T's Factory
- Children: Kōki Koyasu (son)
- Website: tsf-official.com/talent/takehito-koyasu/

Takehito Koyasu (子安 武人, Koyasu Takehito; born May 5, 1967) is a Japanese voice actor from Kanagawa Prefecture, Japan. He is affiliated with and representative of T's Factory, a voice acting agency he founded in October 1998. His son Kōki Koyasu (子安 光樹, Koyasu Kōki) is also a voice actor. Koyasu has taken over many of the characters played by Kaneto Shiozawa after his death.

== Career ==
When Koyasu was in junior high school, he, as an aspiring screen actor himself, was such a movie buff that he would watch movies every day without going to school. By chance, he saw the scene before Tetsurō Hoshino's departure in Adieu Galaxy Express 999 where a group of nameless soldiers take him on the 999 and send him on his way, and was impressed by it. This sparked his interest in voice acting, and since then it has been his policy to aim for "three-dimensional acting." After graduating from high school, he entered a training school. In 1988, he made his voice acting debut in Wowser, and in 1989, he played his first regular character as Gai, the King Yaksha in Legend of Heavenly Sphere Shurato. Although he was a regular character in the series, he was in the position of a villain whose inner workings were rarely discussed in the story, so it was difficult for Koyasu to grasp the role and he had to do several dozen retakes for a single line. He later said that although his name recognition as a voice actor had increased, he did not feel like he was doing his best.

Afterwards, Koyasu played the role of Minos in the OVA Aries released in 1990. The OVA was based on a fantasy manga of the same name that was being serialized at the time, and the voice actors for the main characters were to be decided by a magazine reader's vote. Since Koyasu had appeared in Shurato shortly before this, he had some recognition among the viewers, and he received the most votes for the role of Hades, the main character. However, at the time, Koyasu was still an unknown name in the voice acting industry, and the production members voiced their concerns about giving the lead role to a newcomer like Koyasu. As a result, the results of the readers' poll were rejected, and Koyasu was given the role of Hades' subordinate Minos, a role with little screentime.

In Tekkaman Blade, Koyasu played the main character's rival, Tekkaman Evil (Shinya Aiba). Koyasu himself has often said in interviews that this is his favorite character, and after a period of sluggish performance, he put his voice acting career on the line to play the role, which ultimately led to his recovery. He also said that when he was playing the character, he thought he was really great, but when he watched the footage again later in life, he thought he was terrible at it, which led him to believe he was making progress.

In the late 1990s, Koyasu worked on conceptualizing for the media franchise Weiß Kreuz. He also formed the voice acting unit "Weiß" consisting of voice castmates Shin-ichiro Miki, Tomokazu Seki and Hiro Yūki, and became the first male voice actor to appear on the cover of a voice acting magazine and the first voice actor to make a music clip. In 2000–2001, he was active in music under the name ZAZEL.

After working as a member of Production Baobab (1988–1998), Koyasu established his own representative office, T's Factory, in 1998. On May 5, 2020, on the occasion of his birthday, the official website and Twitter account of T's Factory were opened, and his profile was also released at the same time.

In 2020, Koyasu made his first appearance with his son, voice actor Kōki Koyasu, in an advertisement for Duel Masters. In April, he and Kōki teamed up for their own radio show, "Takehito & Kōki's KOYASU RADIO."

In 2021, he won the Best Actor in Supporting Role award at the 15th Seiyu Awards.

Koyasu's name "Takehito" comes from the fact that his birthday is on Children's Day. His motto is to "make two-dimensional into three-dimensional." His hobby is writing novels and he professes to like video games. He has played every game he has appeared in, but he is not very good at action or shooting games.

== Filmography ==
=== Television animation ===
Year	Title	Role	Notes	Source
1987	The Three Musketeers Anime	Francois		
1989	Ranma ½	Daisuke		
1990	Moomin	Snufkin, The Joxter		
1991	Adventures of the Little Mermaid	Prince Justin		
1991	Delightful Moomin Family: Adventure Diary	Snufkin		
1992	The Brave Fighter of Legend Da-Garn	Seven Changer		
1992	Tekkaman Blade	Shinya Aiba/Tekkaman Evil		
1992	Yu Yu Hakusho	Sakamoto		
1993	The Brave Express Might Gaine	Ran		
1993	Mobile Suit Victory Gundam	Liole Sabat		
1994	DNA²	Ryuji Sugashita		
1994	Brave Police J-Decker	Victim O'Rand, Mecha Victim		
1994	Yu Yu Hakusho	Asato Kido		
1994	Mobile Fighter G Gundam	Neo Sweden Support Team		
1994	Macross 7	Gamlin Kizaki		
1995	Wedding Peach	Sandora		
1995	Fushigi Yûgi	Hotohori		
1995	Slayers	Rezo the Red Priest, Copy Rezo		
1995	Mobile Suit Gundam Wing	Milliardo Peacecraft / Zechs Merquise		
1995	Neon Genesis Evangelion	First Lieutenant Shigeru Aoba		
1996	Rurouni Kenshin	Jinpu		
1996	Crayon Shin-chan	Honda, Kakeru Futamata		
1996	Brave Command Dagwon	Kai Hirose		
1996	Saber Marionette J	Mitsurugi Hanagata		
1996	You're Under Arrest	Tetsu Aoyagi		
1997	Pokémon	Butch		
1997	Revolutionary Girl Utena	Kiryuu Touga		
1998	Initial D	Ryosuke Takahashi		
1998	Princess Nine	Takasugi Hiroki		
1998	Trigun	Roderick Captain		
1998	Nazca	Masanari Tate		
1998	Sorcerous Stabber Orphen: Begins	Flameheart		
1998	Weiß Kreuz	Ran "Aya" Fujimiya		
1999	Betterman	Lamia		
1999	Shin Hakkenden	Kai		
1999	Turn A Gundam	Gym Ghingham		
1999	Angel Links	Warren		
1999	Magic User's Club	Ayanojyo Aburatsubo		
1999	Sorcerous Stabber Orphen: Revenge	Flamesoul		
1999	Excel Saga	Il Palazzo		
2000	Gate Keepers	Chotaro Banba		
2000	Boys Be...	Takuya Yokota		
2000	Sakura Wars	Yuichi Kayama		
2000	Yu-Gi-Oh! Duel Monsters	Arkana/Pandora		
2000	Gravitation	Sakano		
2000	Argento Soma	Dan Simmonds		
2000	Mon Colle Knights	Redda		
2001	Beyblade / Beyblade: G-Revolution	Boris Balkov (Borkov)		
2001	Star Ocean EX	Dias Flac		
2001	Detective Conan	Shiro Murakami	ep. 248	
2001	Prétear	Tanaka		
2001	Inuyasha	Gatenmaru		
2001	Shaman King	Faust VIII		
2001	Final Fantasy: Unlimited	Pist Shaz the 11th		
2001	Captain Tsubasa: Road to 2002	Adult Kojiro Hyuga		
2001	Hellsing	Luke Valentine		
2002	Full Metal Panic!	Zaiede		
2002	Pokémon Chronicles	Butch		
2002	Pokémon: Advanced	Butch		
2002	Saint Seiya: The Hades Chapter	Wyvern Rhadamanthys		
2002	The Twelve Kingdoms	Keiki		
2002	Samurai Deeper Kyo	Hatori Hanzo, Hotaru		
2002	Dragon Drive	Rokkaku		
2002	Overman King Gainer	Asuham Boone		
2002	Hungry Heart: Wild Striker	Kanō Seisuke		
2002	GetBackers	Juubei Kakei		
2002	Mobile Suit Gundam SEED	Mu La Flaga		
2003	Air Master	Fukamichi		
2003	Gad Guard	Takenaka		
2003	Kaleido Star	Fool		
2003	The Mythical Detective Loki Ragnarok	Mysterious Thief Freyr		
2003	Astro Boy	Rainbow Parakeet		
2003	Cinderella Boy	Ranma Hinamatsuri		
2003	Planetes	Yuri Mihairokoh		
2003	Gungrave	Balladbird Lee		
2003	Papuwa	Harlem, Komoro		
2003	Twin Spica	Lion-san		
2003	Bobobo-bo Bo-bobo	Bobobo-bo Bo-bobo		
2003	Fullmetal Alchemist	Lujon		
2004	Area 88	Shin Kazama		
2004	Sgt. Frog	Kururu, Chibi Kuru		
2004	Ragnarok the Animation	Keough/Haze		
2004	Mahoromatic	Ryuga Tou		
2004	Samurai 7	Ukyo, Amanushi		
2004	Yu-Gi-Oh! Duel Monsters GX	Takuma Saiou		
2004	Mobile Suit Gundam SEED Destiny	Mu La Flaga/Neo Roanoke		
2004	Yakitate!! Japan	Ryo Kuroyanagi		
2004	Meine Liebe	Isaac Cavendish		
2004	Major	Shigeharu Honda		
2005	Negima! Magister Negi Magi	Nagi Springfield (Series 1)		
2005	Samurai Champloo	Umanosuke		
2005	Suki na Mono wa Suki Dakara Shōganai!!	Yoru		
2005	Rockman EXE Stream	Iriya		
2005	Buzzer Beater	Gyuuma		
2005	The Law of Ueki	Li Ho		
2005	Loveless	Ritsu Minami		
2005	Speed Grapher	Katsuya Shirogane		
2005	Hell Girl	Yoshiyuki Honjo		
2005	One Piece	Admiral Aokiji/Kuzan		
2006	Kagihime Monogatari Eikyū Alice Rondo	Alternate L. Takion		
2006	Meine Liebe ~Wieder~	Isaac Cavendish		
2006	Lemon Angel Project	Shinya Himuro		
2006	Ouran High School Host Club	Ryoji "Ranka" Fujioka		
2006	Pokémon the Series: Diamond and Pearl	Butch		
2006	Saiunkoku Monogatari	Sakujun Sa (Senya Rin)		
2006	Spider Riders	Igneous		
2006	The Third	Joganki		
2006	Demonbane	Winfield		
2006	Red Garden	Hervé Girardot		
2006	Super Robot Wars Original Generation: Divine Wars	Shu Shirakawa		
2006	Mamoru-kun ni Megami no Shukufuku o!	Johan Deiter Rudiger		
2006	Gintama	Shinsuke Takasugi		
2006	My Bride Is a Mermaid	Shark Fujishiro		
2006	Kōtetsu Sangokushi	Shotatsuryo Koumei		
2006	Toward the Terra	Keith Anyan		
2006	Baccano!	Luck Gandor		
2006	Majin Tantei Nōgami Neuro	Nougami Neuro		
2006	Myself ; Yourself	Syusuke Wakatsuki		
2006	Bleach	Pesche Guatiche, Hexapodus		
2008	Rosario + Vampire	Narrator		
2008	Persona: Trinity Soul	Ryō Kanzato		
2008	Soul Eater	Excalibur		
2008	Hakushaku to Yōsei	Kelpie		
2008	Tales of the Abyss	Jade Curtiss		
2008	To Love Ru	Zastin		
2009	Chrome Shelled Regios	Karian Loss		
2009	Sengoku Basara: Samurai Kings	Sarutobi Sasuke		
2009	Fullmetal Alchemist: Brotherhood	Scar's Brother		
2009	Metal Fight Beyblade	Daidouji		
2009	Hanasakeru Seishōnen	Quinza		
2009	Needless	Adam Blade		
2009	Princess Lover!	Vincent Van Hossen		
2009	Shin Koihime Musō	Ukitsu (Yu Ji)		
2010	Arakawa Under the Bridge	Sister		
2010	The Betrayal Knows My Name	Takashiro Giou		
2010	Occult Academy	JK		
2010	Bakuman	Koji Yoshida		
2010	Princess Jellyfish	Hanamori Yoshio		
2011	Guilty Crown	Shibungi		
2011	Level E	Captain Kraft		
2011	Dog Days	Loran Martinozzi		
2011	Nura: Rise of the Yokai Clan	Kyuso		
2011	Future Diary	Kurou Amano		
2011	Horizon in the Middle of Nowhere	Shirojiro Bertoni		
2011	Mobile Suit Gundam AGE	Frederick Algreus		
2011	Phi Brain: Puzzle of God	Makata Jin		
2011	Yondemasuyo, Azazel-san	Lucifer		
2011	Hunter × Hunter	Dalzollene	2011 TV Series	
2012	High School DxD	Raiser Phoenix		
2012	Sword Art Online	Fairy King Oberon / Nobuyuki Sugou		
2012	The Knight in the Area	Akito Horikawa		
2012	My Little Monster	Takashi Mizutani		
2012	Brave 10	Date Masamune		
2012	Aikatsu!	Taichi Hoshimiya		
2012	Code Geass: Akito the Exiled	Andrea Farnese		
2012	JoJo's Bizarre Adventure: Phantom Blood	Dio Brando		
2012	Date A Live	Kyouhei Kannazuki		
2012	Psycho-Pass	Talisman		
2012	World War Blue	Zelig		
2013	Valvrave the Liberator	Amadeus K. Dorssia		
2014	Buddy Complex	Wilhelm Hahn		
2014	Buddy Complex Final: Ano Sora ni Kaeru Mirai de	Wilhelm Hahn		
2014	Date A Live II	Kyouhei Kannazuki		
2014	Dai-Shogun – Great Revolution	Shigeyoshi Hitotsubashi		
2014	Detective Conan	Toshinari Shiga	ep. 748–749	
2014	Dragonar Academy	Milgaus/Julius/Moldred		
2014	Hamatora	Chiyuu's manager		
2014	Inari, Konkon, Koi Iroha	Toshi		
2014	The Irregular at Magic High School	Tatsuya Shiba's Father		
2014	Knights of Sidonia	Ochiai		
2014	Lord Marksman and Vanadis	Faron		
2014	Mekakucity Actors	Tsukihiko		
2014	Sengoku Basara: End of Judgement	Sarutobi Sasuke		
2014	Tsukimonogatari	Teori Tadatsuru		
2014	HappinessCharge PreCure!	Oresky		
2014	Nisekoi	Claude		
2014	Marvel Disk Wars: The Avengers	Wade Wilson/Deadpool		
2014	Magic Kaito 1412	Alain Cartier		
2014	JoJo's Bizarre Adventure: Stardust Crusaders	DIO		
2015	Assassination Classroom	Gastro		
2015	Shirobako	Tsuyoshi Makurada		
2015	World Break: Aria of Curse for a Holy Swordsman	Charles Saint-Germain		
2015	Kuroko's Basketball	Naoto Sanada		
2015	Gundam Reconguista in G	La Gu		
2015	The Heroic Legend of Arslan	Guiscard		
2015	Food Wars!: Shokugeki no Soma	Gin Dōjima		
2015	Sidonia no Kishi: Dai-kyū Wakusei Sen'eki	Ochiai		
2015	Overlord	Nigun Grid Luin		
2015	Rampo Kitan: Game of Laplace	Shadow-Man		
2015	JoJo's Bizarre Adventure: Stardust Crusaders – Battle in Egypt	DIO		
2015	Star-Myu	Haruto Tsukigami		
2015	Seraph of the End: Battle in Nagoya	Lucal Wesker		
2015	Cardfight!! Vanguard G	Yuuichirou Kanzaki		
2015	Ushio and Tora	Tayura		
2015	Yo-kai Watch: Enma Daiō to Itsutsu no Monogatari da Nyan!	Zazel		
2016	Magi: Adventure of Sinbad	Barbarossa		
2016	Girls Beyond the Wasteland	Hosokawa		
2016	Sekko Boys	Molière		
2016	Cardfight!! Vanguard G Stride Gate	Yuuichirou Kanzaki		
2016	Tales of Zestiria the X	Lunarre		
2016	Re:Zero -Starting Life in Another World-	Roswaal L. Mathers		
2016	Food Wars!: Shokugeki no Soma: The Second Plate	Gin Dōjima		
2016	Alderamin on the Sky	Sarihaslag Remeon		
2017	Attack on Titan Season 2	Zeke Jaeger (Beast Titan)		
2017	Star-Myu: High School Star Musical 2	Haruto Tsukigami		
2017	ID-0	Addams Forte Chevalier		
2017	Digimon Universe: Appli Monsters	Biomon		
2017	18if	Katsumi Kanzaki		
2017	Elegant Yokai Apartment Life	Fool		
2017	Grimoire of Zero	13-ban		
2017	Twin Angel Break	Jon Garabushi	ep. 1, 11–12	
2017	Mahojin Guru Guru	Higaji	ep. 21–22, 24	
2017	Love Tyrant	Maoh		
2017	Blood Blockade Battlefront & Beyond	Li Gado		
2017	UQ Holder!	Nagi Springfield		
2017	Food Wars!: Shokugeki no Soma: The Third Plate	Gin Dōjima		
2018	Attack on Titan Season 3	Zeke Jaeger (Beast Titan)		
2018	Beyblade Burst Super Z	Phi, Hearts		
2018	Baki	Hector Doyle		
2018	A Certain Magical Index III	Knight Leader		
2018	Sirius the Jaeger	Kershner		
2018	Radiant	Grimm		
2018	That Time I Got Reincarnated as a Slime	Clayman		
2018	Violet Evergarden	Claudia Hodgins		
2019	Ahiru no Sora	Tomohisa Kurumatani		
2019	Ascendance of a Bookworm	Benno		
2019	Attack on Titan Season 3: Part 2	Zeke Jaeger (Beast Titan)		
2019	Boruto: Naruto Next Generations	Tosaka		
2019	Demon Slayer: Kimetsu no Yaiba	Hand Demon (Teoni)		
2019	Date A Live III	Kyouhei Kannazuki		
2019	Cardfight!! Vanguard Shinemon Arc	Yuichirou Kanzaki		
2019	Fairy Gone	Tosaka		
2019	Food Wars!: Shokugeki no Soma: The Fourth Plate	Gin Dōjima		
2019	Isekai Quartet	Roswaal L. Mathers		
2019	Kaguya-sama: Love Is War	Papa Shirogane		
2019	One-Punch Man II	Gyoro Gyoro		
2019	Star-Myu: High School Star Musical 3	Haruto Tsukigami		
2019	Super Dragon Ball Heroes	Hearts		
2020	Ascendance of a Bookworm 2nd Season	Benno		
2020	BNA: Brand New Animal	Cliff Boris		
2020	By the Grace of the Gods	Reinbach		
2020	Darwin's Game	Hiiragi Ichirou		
2020	Deca-Dence	Hugin		
2020	Dragon Quest: The Adventure of Dai	Mystvearn, The Dark King Vearn (real form)		
2020	Food Wars!: Shokugeki no Soma: The Fifth Plate	Gin Dōjima		
2020	Isekai Quartet 2nd Season	Roswaal L. Mathers		
2020	Iwa-Kakeru! Sport Climbing Girls	Jūzō Gotō		
2020	Kaguya-sama: Love Is War?	Papa Shirogane		
2020	Re:Zero -Starting Life in Another World 2nd Season	Roswaal L. Mathers		
2021	Attack on Titan: The Final Season	Zeke Jaeger (Beast Titan)		
2021	Hortensia Saga	Fernando Ober, Beltran De Boske		
2021	Back Arrow	Lord Walston		
2021	SK8 the Infinity	Adam (Ainosuke Shindo)		
2021	Sorcerous Stabber Orphen: Battle of Kimluck	Name		
2021	That Time I Got Reincarnated as a Slime 2nd Season	Clayman		
2021	Shaman King (2021)	Faust VIII		
2021	Vivy: Fluorite Eye's Song	Dr. Matsumoto		
2021	My Next Life as a Villainess: All Routes Lead to Doom! X	Geoffrey Stuart		
2021	Kageki Shojo!!	Kōsaburō Shirakawa		
2021	The Detective Is Already Dead	Chameleon		
2021	The Vampire Dies in No Time	Yomotsuzaga		
2021	Platinum End	Luta		
2021	Blade Runner: Black Lotus	Niander Wallace Jr		
2021	JoJo's Bizarre Adventure: Stone Ocean (Chapter 1)	DIO		
2022	Attack on Titan: The Final Season Part 2	Zeke		
2022	The Greatest Demon Lord Is Reborn as a Typical Nobody	Alvarto Exex		
2022	Date A Live IV	Kyouhei Kannazuki		
2022	Dance Dance Danseur	Nakamura		
2022	Kaguya-sama: Love is War – Ultra Romantic	Papa Shirogane		
2022	Vermeil in Gold	Obsidian		
2022	Uncle From Another World	Ojisan ("Uncle")		
2022	The Devil Is a Part-Timer!!	Gabriel		
2022	The Eminence in Shadow	Mordred	ep. 20	
2022	The Human Crazy University	Shigeo Ijūin		
2022	To Your Eternity 2nd Season	Bonchien Nicoli la Tasty Peach Uralis		
2022	JoJo's Bizarre Adventure: Stone Ocean (Chapter 2)	DIO		
2023	Bungo Stray Dogs 4/5	Nikolai Gogol		
2023	Revenger	Jinkurō Isarizawa		
2023	The Eminence in Shadow 2nd Season	Mordred		
2023	The Reincarnation of the Strongest Exorcist in Another World	Zolmnem		
2023	Too Cute Crisis	Shamil Naga		
2023	Magical Destroyers	Game Otaku		
2023	Jujutsu Kaisen 2nd Season	Toji Fushiguro		
2023	Firefighter Daigo: Rescuer in Orange	Shirō Amakasu		
2023	Ragna Crimson	Grymwelte		
2023	MF Ghost	Ryō Takahashi		
2023	Frieren	Kraft		
2024	Ishura	Jelky the Swift Ink		
2024	Mashle: Magic and Muscles	Margarette Macaron		
2024	The Banished Former Hero Lives as He Pleases	Craig		
2024	The Fable	Hiroshi Suzuki		
2024	Grendizer U	Gandal		
2024	Suicide Squad Isekai	Peacemaker		
2024	Our Last Crusade or the Rise of a New World Season II	Glory		
2024	No Longer Allowed in Another World	Pope		
2024	I'll Become a Villainess Who Goes Down in History	Luke Seeker		
2024	Acro Trip	Hugh		
2024	Tōhai	Hatakeyama		
2024	The Most Notorious "Talker" Runs the World's Greatest Clan	Finocchio Barzini		
2024	Ron Kamonohashi's Forbidden Deductions 2nd Season	Tiger Dan		
2025	Bogus Skill "Fruitmaster"	Hakamori		
2025	I'm a Noble on the Brink of Ruin, So I Might as Well Try Mastering Magic	Raymond		
2025	I'm the Evil Lord of an Intergalactic Empire!	Guide		
2025	The Brilliant Healer's New Life in the Shadows	Becker		
2025	New Saga	Ganias		
2025	The Water Magician	Michael		
2025	City the Animation	Dr. Adatara, Adatara's father		
2025	Dusk Beyond the End of the World	Marlum		
2025	Ninja vs. Gokudo	Hiroki Yajima		
2026	Hana-Kimi	Masao Himejima		
2026	The Cat and the Dragon	Nekoryū		
2026	Hell Teacher: Jigoku Sensei Nube	"A"		
2026	I Want to End This Love Game	Masaru Shinonome		
2026	One Piece: Heroines	Lebno Listchaque		
2026	Daemons of the Shadow Realm	Roei Tadera		
2027	Multi-Mind Mayhem	Ignus		

=== Original video animation (OVA) ===
Year	Title	Role	Source
1989	Zetsuai 1989	Izumi Takuto	
	K.O. Beast	Bud Mint	
1992–94	Tokyo Babylon	Seishirō Sakurazuka	
1993–95	The Heroic Legend of Arslan III-VI	Melrain	
1995	Fire Emblem	Nabarl	
1997	Gestalt	Father Oliver	
1999	Harlock Saga	Fasolt	
2000	Angel Sanctuary	Sakuya Kira	
2001	ZOE: 2167 IDOLO	Radium Levans	
2003–04	New Fist of the North Star	Kenshiro	
2004	Angelique	Olivie	
2005	Papa to Kiss in the Dark	Takayuki Utsunomiya	
2006	Hellsing Ultimate	Luke Valentine	
2009	Naruto: The Cross Roads	Kajika	
2009–11	Saint Seiya: The Lost Canvas	Nasu Veronica	
2011	Fate/Prototype	Sancraid Phahn	
2016	Kamisama Kiss: Kako-hen	Kirakaburi	
2016	Star-Myu: High School Star Musical	Haruto Tsukigami	
2019	Strike the Blood III	Ki Juranbarada	
2021	Strike the Blood IV	Ki Juranbarada	

=== Original net animation (ONA) ===
Year	Title	Role	Notes	Source
2018	A.I.C.O. -Incarnation-	Kyōsuke Isazu		
2021	Pokémon Evolutions	Ghetsis		
2021–22	JoJo's Bizarre Adventure: Stone Ocean (Chapter 3)	Dio		
2022	Shiyakusho	Masamichi Shimura		
2022	Spriggan	Mirage		
2022	Bastard!! -Heavy Metal, Dark Fantasy-	Di-amon		
2025	Koisuru One Piece	Toriko Kurono		
2025	Moonrise	Wise Crowne		
2025	Yu-Gi-Oh! Card Game The Chronicles	Maximus Dragma		

=== Films ===
Year	Title	Role	Source
1992	Comet in Moominland	Snufkin	
1997	Slayers Great	Huey	
1997	Rurouni Kenshin: Requiem for the Ishin Patriots	Sadashirô Kajiki	
1998	Spriggan	Jean Jacquemonde	
2006	Keroro Gunsō the Super Movie	Sergeant Major Kururu	
2007	Chō Gekijōban Keroro Gunsō 2: Shinkai no Princess de Arimasu!	Sergeant Major Kururu	
2008	Keroro Gunso the Super Movie 3: Keroro vs. Keroro Great Sky Duel	Sergeant Major Kururu	
2009	Keroro Gunso the Super Movie 4: Gekishin Dragon Warriors	Sergeant Major Kururu	
2010	Keroro Gunso the Super Movie: Creation! Ultimate Keroro, Wonder Space-Time Island	Sergeant Major Kururu	
2010	Gintama: The Movie	Shinsuke Takasugi	
2011	Heart no Kuni no Alice: Wonderful Wonder World	Julius Monrey	
2012	The Mystical Laws		
2015	Yo-Kai Watch: Enma Daiō to Itsutsu no Monogatari da Nyan!	Nurarihyon	
2018	Batman Ninja	Gorilla Grodd	
2019	Hello World	Tsunehisa Senko	
2020	Fate/Grand Order: Camelot – Wandering; Agaterám	Ozymandias	
2021	Gintama The Final	Shinsuke Takasugi	
2023	Kaguya-sama: Love Is War - The First Kiss That Never Ends	Papa Shirogane	
2024	Mobile Suit Gundam SEED Freedom	Mu Lu Flaga	
2025	Toi-san	Kenichi Minamoto	
2025	Undead Unluck Winter Arc	Balance	
2026	Kusunoki no Bannin	Masakazu Yanagisawa	
2026	Shin Gekijōban Keroro Gunsō: Fukkatsu Shite Sokkō Chikyū Metsubō no Kiki de Arimasu!	Sergeant Major Kururu	
2027	The Eminence in Shadow: Lost Echoes	Mordred	

=== Video games ===
Year	Title	Role	Notes	Source
1995	Battle Arena Toshinden	Kayin Amoh		
1997	The King of Fighters '97	Shingo Yabuki		
1997	Lego Island	Return, Snap Lockitt		
1997	Magical Drop III	Hierophant, Hanged Man, Chariot		
1998	The King of Fighters '98	Shingo Yabuki		
1998	The King of Fighters: Kyo	Shingo Yabuki		
1998	Dragon Force II	Shepherd		
1998	Poporogue	Boris		
1999	The King of Fighters '99	Shingo Yabuki		
1999	Galerians	Birdman		
1999	Transformers: Beast Wars Transmetals	Beast Convoy		
1999	Persona 2: Innocent Sin	Tatsuya Suou		
1999–present	Super Robot Wars	Shu Shirakawa, Gym Ghingnham, Zechs Merquise/Miliardo Peacecraft, Mu La Flaga, Neo Roanoke, Gamrin Kizaki, Abe no Seimei, Asuham Boone		
2000	The King of Fighters 2000	Shingo Yabuki		
2000	Rockman DASH 2	Glyde		
2000	Persona 2: Eternal Punishment	Tatsuya Suou		
2001	The King of Fighters 2001	Shingo Yabuki		
2001	Family Project	Lau	as Hayato Jumonji	
2001	Growlanser III: The Dual Darkness	Zion		
2002	Xenosaga Episode I: Der Wille zur Macht	Tony		
2002	Grandia Xtreme	Kroitz		
2002	Tokimeki Memorial Girl's Side	Himuro Reiichi		
2002	Guilty Gear X2#Reload	Eddie		
2003	The King of Fighters 2003	Shingo Yabuki		
2003	Muv-Luv	Takahashi Ichimonji, Naoya Sagiri		
2004	Xenosaga Episode II: Jenseits von Gut und Böse	Tony		
2004	Demonbane	Winfield	PS2 version	
2004	Anima Mundi: Dark Alchemist	Bruno Glening		
2004	The Legend of Heroes: Trails in the Sky	Olivert Reise Arnor/Olivier Lenheim		
2004	Dragon Quest VIII: Journey of the Cursed King	Dhoulmagus		
2004	Remember11: The Age of Infinity	Satoru Yukidoh		
2004	Shadow Hearts: Covenant	Nicolas/Nicolai Conrad		
2005	The King of Fighters XI	Shingo Yabuki		
2005	Sengoku Basara	Sarutobi Sasuke		
2005	Tales of the Abyss	Jade Curtiss		
2005	Kingdom Hearts II	Seifer Almasy		
2005	Shining Force Neo	Klein		
2005	Phantom Kingdom	Zetta		
2005	Musashi: Samurai Legend	Gandrake		
2006	Xenosaga Episode III: Also Sprach Zarathustra	Tony		
2006	Disgaea 2: Cursed Memories	Mr. Rabbit, Fubuki, Badass Overlord Zeta		
2006	Valkyrie Profile: Lenneth	Lezard Valeth		
2006	Valkyrie Profile 2: Silmeria			
2006	Nana: Everything Is Controlled By The Great Demon King!?	Takumi Ichinose	PS2 version	
2006	Muv-Luv Alternative	Takahashi Ichimonji, Naoya Sagiri		
2006	Another Century's Episode 2	Zechs Merquise		
2006	EVE new generation	Kojiro Amagi		
2007	ASH: Archaic Sealed Heat	Dan		
2007	Dynasty Warriors: Gundam	Zechs Merquise		
2007	Ar tonelico II	Alfman Uranous		
2008	Dynasty Warriors: Gundam 2	Zechs Merquise, Gym Ghingnham		
2008	Initial D Extreme Stage	Ryosuke Takahashi		
2008	GetAmped2	Fabicro		
2008	Lux-Pain	Liu Yee		
2009	The King of Fighters 2002 Unlimited Match	Shingo Yabuki		
2009	Hoshizora no Memoria -Wish upon a shooting star-	Haruto Okaizumi		
2009	The Idolmaster SP	Takao Kuroi		
2009	Shin Megami Tensei: Strange Journey Redux	Arthur		
2010	Resonance of Fate	Sullivan		
2010	Hoshizora no Memoria Eternal Heart	Haruto Okaizumi		
2010	Keroro RPG: Kishi to Musha to Densetsu no Kaizoku	Kululu		
2010	Dynasty Warriors: Gundam 3	Zechs Merquise, Gym Ghingnham		
2010	Fist of the North Star: Ken's Rage	Rei		
2011	Catherine	Jonathan Ariga		
2011	The Legend of Heroes: Trails to Azure	Olivert Reise Arnor/Olivier Lenheim		
2011	SD Gundam G Generation World	Zechs Merquise/Miliardo Peacecraft, Mu La Flaga, Neo Roanoke		
2011	Nora to Toki no Kōbō: Kiri no Mori no Majo,	Juka Waltnen		
2012	Beyond the Labyrinth	Sealed One		
2012	Bravely Default	Braev Lee the Templar		
2012	E.X. Troopers	Gingira		
2012	Fire Emblem Awakening	Lon'qu, Validar		
2012	Heroes Phantasia	Kululu		
2012	Soulcalibur V	Creation Male Voice Super Human		
2013	JoJo's Bizarre Adventure: All Star Battle	Dio Brando/Dio, Diego Brando		
2013	Fate/EXTRA CCC	Hans Christian Andersen		
2013	Dynasty Warriors Gundam Reborn	Zechs Merquise, Gym Ghingnham		
2013	The Legend of Heroes: Trails of Cold Steel	Olivert Reise Arnor/Olivier Lenheim		
2014	Guilty Gear Xrd -SIGN-	Zato-1	Also -REVELATOR-	
2014	The Crew	Alex Taylor	Japanese Dub	
2014	Bayonetta 2	Masked Lumen/Balder		
2015	JoJo's Bizarre Adventure: Eyes of Heaven	Dio Brando/Dio/Dio, Gone to Heaven, Diego Brando, Alternate World Diego		
2015	Fate/Grand Order	Hans Christian Andersen, Mephistopheles, Ozymandias (Ramesses II)		
2015	Tales of Zestiria	Lunarre, Jade Curtiss		
2015	Kenka Bancho 6: Soul and Blood	Mido Tatsuya		
2015	Tokyo Mirage Sessions ♯FE	Navarre, Lon'qu		
2015	Disgaea 5: Alliance of Vengeance	Red Magnus		
2015	Hakuoki: Kyoto Winds	Kanryusai Takeda		
2015	Fire Emblem Fates	Niles		
2016	Arena of Valor	Valhein, Dirak		
2016	Breath of Fire 6	Masamune		
2016	Hakuoki: Edo Blossoms	Kanryusai Takeda		
2016	Yu-Gi-Oh! Duel Links	Pandora, Takuma Saiou		
2016	Mighty No. 9	Mr. Graham		
2017	Captain Tsubasa: Dream Team	Rivaul		
2017	Yakuza Kiwami 2	Kei Ibuchi		
2017	Atelier Lydie & Suelle: The Alchemists and the Mysterious Paintings	Roger Malen		
2017	Dissidia Final Fantasy: Opera Omnia	Seifer Almasy		
2017	Fire Emblem Echoes: Shadows of Valentia	Saber		
2017	Fire Emblem Heroes	Lon'qu, Niles, Navarre, Saber, Lewyn, Pent		
2017	Onmyoji	Lord Arakawa (Arakawa no Aruji)		
2017	Gundam Versus	Zechs Merquise, Gym Ghingnham. Mu La Flaga		
2018	The King of Fighters All Star	Shingo Yabuki, Shinsuke Takasugi		
2018	Stand My Heroes	Narumi Seo		
2018	Sdorica	Jahan Augustinus, Hyde Oust		
2018	Dragalia Lost	Morsayati/The Other, Mordecai, Xenos/The Progenitor		
2019	Jump Force	Dio		
2019	Fire Emblem: Three Houses	Seteth		
2019	The King of Fighters for Girls	Shingo Yabuki		
2019	JoJo's Bizarre Adventure: Last Survivor	Dio		
2020	League of Legends	Sett		
2020	Final Fantasy Crystal Chronicles: Remastered Edition	Stiltzkin		
2020	Kamen Rider: Memory of Heroez	Zeus Dopant		
2021	Jack Jeanne	Shuri Chuza		
2021	Guilty Gear -STRIVE-	Zato-1		
2021	Buddy Mission Bond	Fuga		
2021	The Caligula Effect 2	Bluffman		
2021	Cookie Run: Kingdom	Ninja Cookie		
2021	#Compass	Ignis 'Will' Wisp		
2021	Demon Slayer: Kimetsu no Yaiba – The Hinokami Chronicles	Hand Demon (Teoni)		
2021	Counter:Side	G.A.P.		
2022	Dream Meister and the Recollected Black Fairy	Oscar		
2022	Triangle Strategy	Ser Maxwell Trier		
2022	Fire Emblem Warriors: Three Hopes	Seteth		
2022	Eve: Ghost Enemies	Kojiroh Amagi		
2022	JoJo's Bizarre Adventure: All Star Battle R	Dio Brando/Dio, Diego Brando, Alternate World Diego		
2022	Mobile Suit Gundam: Arsenal Base	Zechs Merquise/Milliardo Peacecraft, Mu La Flaga		
2022	Goddess of Victory: Nikke	Mustang		
2023	One Piece Odyssey	Aokiji/Kuzan		
2023	Fire Emblem Engage	Kagetsu		
2023	The King of Fighters XV	Shingo Yabuki		
2023	Hi-Fi Rush	Kale Vandelay		
2023	Octopath Traveler II	Harvey		
2023	Street Fighter 6	Carlos Miyamoto		
2023	Master Detective Archives: Rain Code	Yakou Furio		
2023	Live A Hero!	Thereol		
2023	Touken Ranbu	Jikkyuu Mitsutada		
2023	Infinity Strash – Dragon Quest: The Adventure of Dai	MystVearn		
2023	TEVI	Vassago		
2024	Rise of the Rōnin	Kogoro Katsura		
2024	Like a Dragon: Infinite Wealth	Yutaka Yamai		
2024	Jujutsu Kaisen: Cursed Clash	Toji Fushiguro		
2024	Jujutsu Kaisen: Phantom Parade	Toji Fushiguro		
2024	Gundam Breaker 4	Chaos		
2024	Metaphor: ReFantazio	More		
2024	Romance of the Three Kingdoms 8 Remake	Zhuge Liang		
2024	Wizardry Variants Daphne	Shagtis		
2025	Granblue Fantasy	Nagi Springfield, Zurvan, Shinsuke Takasugi, Bobobo-bo Bo-bobo, Lucius		
2025	BLEACH Rebirth of Souls	Pesche Guatiche		
2025	RAIDOU Remastered: The Mystery of the Soulless Army	Narumi		
2025	Atelier Yumia: The Alchemist of Memories & the Envisioned Land	Monocular Werewolf		
2025	Morimens	Doresain		
2025	Trails in the Sky 1st Chapter	Olivier Lenheim		
2026	The Adventures of Elliot: The Millennium Tales	King Ichard		
2026	Honkai: Star Rail	Ashveil		
2026	Marvel Tōkon: Fighting Souls	Deadpool		
2026	Fire Emblem: Fortune's Weave	Seteth		

=== Tokusatsu ===
Year	Title	Role	Notes	Source
2026	Super Space Sheriff Gavan Infinity	Patran		

=== Drama CDs ===
- 17 Sai no Hisoka na Yokujou, Takamura
- Anatolia Story Sound Theater 8, Ramses
- Ballettstar, Tachibana Miyuki
- Corsair, Yani
- Fire Emblem, Reimeihen & Shiranhen (Nabarl)
- Fruits Basket (1999), Ayame Sohma
- Fushigi Yūgi Genbu Kaiden, Urumiya
- GFantasy Comic CD Collection Fire Emblem: Ankoku Ryū to Hikari no Ken, Nabarl
- Hakushaku to Yōsei, Kelpie
- Hanazakari no Kimitachi e, Masao Himejima
- Hatoful Boyfriend, Shuu Iwamine
- Hello!! Doctor, Taku Kagami
- Himitsu no Kateikyoushi, Koki Amagata
- Katsuai series 1, Reiji Takami
- The King of Fighters Drama CDs, Yabuki Shingo
- Majin Tantei Nougami Neuro radio drama – Neuro Nougami
- Meine Liebe, Isaac Cavendish
- My Sexual Harassment series 2: Yume Kamoshirenai, young man
- Needless, Adam Blade
- Onmyouden no Tobira, Hotaru
- Otokonoko niwa Himitsu ga Aru, Shiratori
- Papa to Mira series 1: Kiss in the Dark, Takayuki Utsunomiya
- Papa to Mira series 2: Loving All Night, Takayuki Utsunomiya
- Papa to Mira series 3: Deep in the Forest, Takayuki Utsunomiya
- Pink na Chopin
- Punch Up!, Maki Motoharu
- Sex Pistols-Love Pistols, Madarame Yonekuni
- Requiem of the Rose King (2017), Warwick
- Suikoden, Gremio
- Superior, Kagami
- Tales of the Abyss, Jade Curtiss
- Target in the Finder, Asami Ryuichi
- The Epic of Zektbach～Masinowa～, Gijiri
- Vampire Knight, Headmaster Cross
- Ze, Moriya

=== Dubbing ===
==== Live-action ====
Year	Title	Role	Voice double	Notes	Source
1993	She-Wolf of London	Male Student 1			
1995	Swing Kids	Thomas Berger	Christian Bale		
1996	Rumble in the Bronx	Tony	Marc Akerstream		
1996	Showgirls	Jeff	Dewey Weber		
1997	That Thing You Do!	Guy Patterson	Tom Everett Scott		
1999	Can't Hardly Wait	Mike Dexter	Peter Facinelli		
2002	The Time Machine	Alexander Hartdegen	Guy Pearce		
2002	Scooby-Doo	Fred Jones	Freddie Prinze Jr.		
2004	Scooby-Doo 2: Monsters Unleashed	Fred Jones	Freddie Prinze Jr.		
2010	Cats & Dogs: The Revenge of Kitty Galore	Lou	Neil Patrick Harris		
2016	Suicide Squad	Joker	Jared Leto		
2016	Hello, My Name Is Doris	John Fremont	Max Greenfield		
2018	Pacific Rim Uprising	Marshal Quan	Zhang Jin		
2019	Shazam!	Dr. Thaddeus Sivana	Mark Strong		
2020	Alex Rider	Yassen Gregorovitch	Thomas Levin		
2021	Zack Snyder's Justice League	Joker	Jared Leto		
2021	Free Guy	Antwan	Taika Waititi		
2021	D.P.	Corporal Han Ho-yeol	Koo Kyo-hwan		
2021	The Gentlemen	Michael 'Mickey' Pearson	Matthew McConaughey		
2021	Snake Eyes	Kenta Takamura	Takehiro Hira		
2021	Resident Alien	Dr. Harry Vanderspeigle	Alan Tudyk		
2022	Thor: Love and Thunder	Gorr the God Butcher	Christian Bale		
2023	Shazam! Fury of the Gods	Dr. Thaddeus Sivana	Mark Strong		
2023	Transformers: Rise of the Beasts	Optimus Primal	Ron Perlman		
2024	Madame Web	Ezekiel Sims	Tahar Rahim		
2024	Deadpool & Wolverine	Nicepool	Ryan Reynolds		
2025	Interview with the Vampire	Armand	Antonio Banderas	BS10 Star Channel edition	
2025	The Apprentice	Roy Cohn	Jeremy Strong		
2025	The Fantastic Four: First Steps	Reed Richards / Mister Fantastic	Pedro Pascal		
2025	2 Fast 2 Furious	Carter Verone	Cole Hauser	The Cinema edition	
2026	Eddington	Ted Garcia	Pedro Pascal		
2026	Avengers: Doomsday	Reed Richards / Mister Fantastic	Pedro Pascal		

==== Animation ====
Year	Title	Role	Notes	Source
2015	Moomins and the Comet Chase	Snufkin		
2015	Moomins on the Riviera	Snufkin		
2017	The Lego Batman Movie	Joker		
2018	The Emoji Movie	Poop		
2023	The Exploits of Moominpappa: Adventures of a Young Moomin	Snufkin, Joxter		
2023	Resident Evil: Death Island	Dylan Blake		
2025	Elio	Universal Users Manual		
2026	Toy Story 5		Cameo	
