= Haigakura =

Japanese manga series

- First tankōbon volume cover, featuring Ichiyo

ハイガクラ
- Genre: Action, fantasy
- Manga
- Written by: Shinobu Takayama
- Published by: Ichijinsha
- Imprint: Zero Sum Comics
- Magazine: Comic Zero Sum WARD; (January 2008–May 2015); Zero-Sum Online; (September 2015–present)
- Original run: January 16, 2008 – present
- Volumes: 17
- Anime television series
- Directed by: Junichi Yamamoto
- Written by: Yū Murai
- Music by: Yuki Kurihara
- Studio: Typhoon Graphics
- Licensed by: NA: Remow; SA/SEA: Muse Communication
- Original network: Tokyo MX, SUN, BS Asahi
- Original run: October 7, 2024 – September 26, 2025
- Episodes: 13
- icon

Haigakura (ハイガクラ) is a Japanese manga series written and illustrated by Shinobu Takayama. It was initially serialized in Ichijinsha's shōjo manga magazine Comic Zero Sum WARD from January 2008 to May 2015, when the magazine ceased publication, and was later transferred to the Zero-Sum Online manga website in September 2015. Its chapters have been collected in seventeen tankōbon volumes as of October 2024.

An anime television series adaptation produced by Typhoon Graphics aired from October 2024 to September 2025.

== Plot ==
The world, which is supported by four gods known as the Four Evils, is in crisis after two of them escape. In order to recover the gods, who have fled to other realms, and restore stability to the world, song officers known as Kashikan use "songs" and "dances" to confine the gods in their "sai". One of the Kashikan, Ichiyo, who was considered a dropout because of his tone-deafness, travels to modern-day Japan to recover the evil gods and return to his ordinary life with help from the subordinate god Tenkō.

== Characters ==
Ichiyō (一葉)
Voiced by: Daisuke Namikawa (drama CD), Takeo Ōtsuka, Junko Takeuchi (young) (anime)
One of the Kashikans searching for the gods who fled to other realms, who is sarcastic and violent. His parents are unknown, and he was raised by Hakugou, the divine beast of the shrine forest. He was imprisoned after Hakugo was taken away, but Ai-Seiwa encouraged him to aim to become a poet. Though tone-deaf, which has led others to consider him a dropout, he is skilled at dance. He hates water and is not a good swimmer.
Tenkō (滇紅)
Voiced by: Mamoru Miyano (drama CD), Kaito Ishikawa (anime)
One of the subordinate gods that Ichiyo uses, who has the ability to control water and is gentle, but prone to sudden changes in mood. Since his divine name is unknown, his name was given to him by Sundori and Ryui. He is arrogant at first, but loses his personality and memory as a result of being used by Ichiyo for singing and dancing. When Ichiyo dissolves, he temporarily regains his abilities and transforms into a form with white hair and red eyes.
Hakushurin (白珠龍)
Voiced by: Lynn (anime)
Ransaiwa (藍采和)
Voiced by: Hiro Shimono (anime)
Sontō (孫登)
Voiced by: Satoshi Hino (anime)
Kaka (花果)
Voiced by: Asuka Tani (drama CD), Rie Kugimiya (anime)
A god serving under Ichiyo, who usually appears as a mild-mannered child but can undergo a ferocious transformation. Unlike the rest of its race, which has lived for 3000 years and changes over time, it has changed since birth and ordinary Kashikans cannot handle it.
Ryuu (龍王)
Voiced by: Mutsumi Tamura (anime)
A god who sealed away the Four Evils and created Goshinzan and Ryugu to protect the country by making it imperceptible to the outside world. He is a subordinate god of Aizenwa and Chief of the Water Department, and has nine children called the Ryusei Kyuuko.
Heikan (丙閑)
Voiced by: Ayumu Murase (anime)
Hōryūsei (峰龍井)
Voiced by: Gakuto Kajiwara (anime)
Hiki (比企)
Voiced by: Ryōhei Kimura (anime)
Sanu (山烏)
Voiced by: Ryōta Suzuki (anime)
Hakugō (白豪)
Voiced by: Kazuhiko Inoue (anime)
Sōkōmei (蒼香茗)
Voiced by: Daisuke Hirakawa (anime)
Ritekkai (李鉄拐)
Voiced by: Daisuke Kishio (anime)
Kanshōri (漢鍾離)
Voiced by: Ryūnosuke Watanuki (anime)
Rakan (羅漢)
Voiced by: Yūji Ueda (drama CD), Shinnosuke Tachibana (anime)
Bui (武夷)
Voiced by: Kohsuke Toriumi (drama CD), Kentarō Itō (anime)
Jungei (春睨)
Voiced by: Akira Sasanuma (anime)
Gaishi (鎧糸)
Voiced by: Tatsumaru Tachibana (anime)
Gas Mask (ガスマスク, Gasumasuku)
Voiced by: Atsushi Tamaru (anime)
Rabbit Mask (ウサギ仮面, Usagi Kamen)
Voiced by: Kazutomi Yamamoto (anime)

== Media ==
=== Manga ===
Written and illustrated by Shinobu Takayama, Haigakura initially began serialization in Ichijinsha's shōjo manga magazine Comic Zero Sum WARD on January 16, 2008. (Note: The series started in the magazine's No. 1 issue of 2008 (cover date), which was released on January 16.) On May 16, 2015, the magazine ceased publication and Haigakura was later transferred to the Zero-Sum Online website. Ichijinsha has collected its chapters into individual tankōbon volumes. The first volume was released on November 25, 2008. As of October 31, 2024, seventeen volumes have been released. Ichijinsha republished the first ten volumes of the series in bunkoban from February 29, 2024, to June 28, 2024.

==== Volumes ====
| No. | Release date | ISBN |
|---|---|---|
| 1 | November 25, 2008 | 978-4-75-805382-2 |
| 2 | October 24, 2009 | 978-4-75-805449-2 |
| 3 | August 25, 2010 | 978-4-75-805536-9 |
| 4 | May 25, 2011 | 978-4-75-805593-2; 978-4-75-805594-9 (SE) |
| 5 | March 24, 2012 | 978-4-75-805693-9 |
| 6 | January 25, 2013 | 978-4-75-805778-3; 978-4-75-805779-0 (SE) |
| 7 | February 25, 2014 | 978-4-75-805877-3; 978-4-75-805878-0 (SE) |
| 8 | February 25, 2015 | 978-4-75-805994-7; 978-4-75-805995-4 (SE) |
| 9 | March 25, 2016 | 978-4-75-803168-4; 978-4-75-803169-1 (SE) |
| 10 | February 25, 2017 | 978-4-75-803258-2; 978-4-75-803259-9 (SE) |
| 11 | June 25, 2018 | 978-4-75-803358-9; 978-4-75-803359-6 (SE) |
| 12 | June 25, 2019 | 978-4-75-803445-6; 978-4-75-803446-3 (SE) |
| 13 | July 27, 2020 | 978-4-75-803532-3; 978-4-75-803533-0 (SE) |
| 14 | June 24, 2021 | 978-4-75-803616-0; 978-4-75-803617-7 (SE) |
| 15 | June 23, 2022 | 978-4-75-803751-8; 978-4-75-803752-5 (SE) |
| 16 | August 24, 2023 | 978-4-75-803916-1; 978-4-75-803917-8 (SE) |
| 17 | October 31, 2024 | 978-4-75-808600-4; 978-4-75-808601-1 (SE) |

=== Anime ===
An anime television series adaptation was announced on August 24, 2023. It is produced by Typhoon Graphics and directed by Junichi Yamamoto, with Yū Murai handling series composition, Masaki Satō designing the characters, and Yuki Kurihara composing the music. The series aired from October 7, 2024, to September 26, 2025, on Tokyo MX and other networks. The opening theme song is "Chaser", performed by Madkid, while the ending theme song is "Phoenix", performed by Hikaru Makishima. Remow licensed the series for streaming on Amazon Prime Video and It's Anime YouTube channel in North America. Muse Communication licensed the series in Southeast Asia.

After the broadcast of the seventh episode, the anime's website announced that the series past the eighth episode would be delayed and would be rebroadcast from November 25, effectively restarting from the first episode. The series restarted airing on July 5, 2025, (Note: Tokyo MX listed the series rebroadcast on July 4 at 25:30, which is effectively July 5 at 1:30 a.m. JST.) with the first new episode aired on August 22 of the same year.

==== Episodes ====
| No. | Title | Directed by | Written by | Storyboarded by | Original release date |
|---|---|---|---|---|---|
| 1 | "The Kagura Dance"; Transliteration: "Kagura no Mai" (Japanese: 神楽之舞) | Toshinori Kobayashi | Yū Murai | Kimitoshi Chioka | October 7, 2024 |
| 2 | "The Thunder Dance"; Transliteration: "Dairyū no Mai" (Japanese: 雷流之舞) | Toshinori Kobayashi & Yoshihiro Yamaguchi | Yūichirō Momose | Toshihiko Masuda | October 14, 2024 |
| 3 | "The Snowflake Dance"; Transliteration: "Tsuka no Mai" (Japanese: 雪華之舞) | Tadao Okubo | Yū Murai | Shinichi Watanabe | October 21, 2024 |
| 4 | "The Moon Water Dance"; Transliteration: "Suigetsu no Mai" (Japanese: 水月之舞) | Tomomi Umezu | Yūichirō Momose | Tomomi Umezu | October 28, 2024 |
| 5 | "The Peach Blossom Spring Dance"; Transliteration: "Tōgen no Mai" (Japanese: 桃源之舞) | Yukio Nishimoto | Yū Murai | Toshihiko Masuda | November 4, 2024 |
| 6 | "The Chaos Dance"; Transliteration: "Konton no Mai" (Japanese: 渾沌之舞) | Shirokuro & Kazumi Kobayashi | Yūichirō Momose | Romanofu Higa | November 11, 2024 |
| 7 | "The Chaos Dance"; Transliteration: "Boryū no Mai" (Japanese: 暴龍之舞) | Hidehiko Kadota | Yū Murai | Kō Matsuzono | November 18, 2024 |
| 8 | "The Oar Song Dance"; Transliteration: "Tōka no Mai" (Japanese: 櫂歌之舞) | Ryo Sagari | Yūichirō Momose | Shinichi Watanabe | August 22, 2025 |
| 9 | "The Forgotten Crimson Dance"; Transliteration: "Wasukare no Mai" (Japanese: 忘紅之舞) | Tadao Okubo | Yū Murai | Toshihiko Masuda | August 29, 2025 |
| 10 | "The Parting Dance"; Transliteration: "Ribetsu no Mai" (Japanese: 離別之舞) | Tadao Okubo | Yūichirō Momose | Toshihiko Masuda | September 5, 2025 |
| 11 | "The Nothingness Dance"; Transliteration: "Uyū no Mai" (Japanese: 烏有之舞) | Yukio Nishimoto & Shunsuke Fujii | Yū Murai | Nakano☆Yo | September 12, 2025 |
| 12 | "The White Tiger Dance"; Transliteration: "Byakko no Mai" (Japanese: 白虎之舞) | Kon Yoshikazu & Shunsuke Fujii | Yūichirō Momose | Kō Matsuzono | September 19, 2025 |
| 13 | "The Flame and Water Dance"; Transliteration: "Tensui no Mai" (Japanese: 炎水之舞) | Hidehiko Kadota & Shunsuke Fujii | Yū Murai | Tōru Yoshida | September 26, 2025 |

== Reception ==
By August 2023, the manga had over 1.3 million copies in circulation.

== See also ==
- Amatsuki, another manga series by Shinobu Takayama.
