= Binbin Takaoka =

Japanese voice actor

- Born: August 10, 1963 (age 63); Aomori Prefecture, Japan
- Occupation: Voice actor

Binbin Takaoka (高岡 瓶々, Takaoka Binbin; born August 10, 1963) is a Japanese voice actor.

== Filmography ==
=== Anime series ===
- A Certain Scientific Railgun – Gensei Kihara
- A Certain Scientific Railgun T – Gensei Kihara
- Bleach: Thousand-Year Blood War – Genryūsai Shigekuni Yamamoto
- Divine Gate – Gareth
- Gin Tama – Sebastian-zou
- Highschool of the Dead – Wakisaka
- Jewelpet – Genshirou Hatori
- Lupin the Third: The Woman Called Fujiko Mine – Dr. Fritz Kaiser
- Mitsudomoe – Noda
- Sengoku Collection – Chief
- Shenmue – Hanhui Liu
- Shinkyoku Sōkai Polyphonica – Orson
- Sora no Manimani – Shinji Moro'oka
- Taishō Baseball Girls – Yōichirō Suzukawa
- Yu-Gi-Oh! 5D's – Zeman the Ape King
- The Saga of Tanya the Evil – Isaac Dustin Drake

=== Original video animation ===
- Katteni Kaizō – Maeda
- Mobile Suit Gundam Unicorn – Neo-Zeon Soldier

=== Original net animation ===
- Shiyakusho – Ishima
- Bastard!! -Heavy Metal, Dark Fantasy- – King of Metallicana

=== Anime films ===
- Bleach: Hell Verse – Murakumo
- Gintama: The Very Final – Former Tendoshu Leader
- Lupin the IIIrd: Daisuke Jigen's Gravestone – Malanda Ambassador
- Saga of Tanya the Evil: The Movie – Isaac Dustin Drake

=== Video games ===
- Bleach: Brave Souls – Genryūsai Shigekuni Yamamoto
- Final Fantasy VII: Rebirth – Mayor Kapono
- Overwatch – Torbjörn
- Professor Layton and the Miracle Mask – Alford Dalston
- Resident Evil 3 – Dario Rosso
- Trinity: Souls of Zill O'll – Dullkina
- Yakuza: Like A Dragon – Yamato Totsuka

=== Dubbing ===
==== Live-action ====
- Apollo 18 (John Grey (Ryan Robbins))
- Bad Country (Lutin (Tom Berenger))
- El Camino: A Breaking Bad Movie (Ed Galbraith (Robert Forster))
- Godzilla: King of the Monsters (Houston Brooks (Joe Morton))
- Harry Potter and the Deathly Hallows – Part 1 (Death Eater)
- In a Better World (Claus (Ulrich Thomsen))
- Ip Man 3 (Fat Bo (Kent Cheng))
- Ip Man 4: The Finale (Fat Bo (Kent Cheng))
- John Wick: Chapter 2 (Abram Tarasov (Peter Stormare))
- Joker (Detective Garrity (Bill Camp))
- Love (General McClain (Corey Richardson))
- Marionette (Oh Kook-chul (Kim Hee-won))
- Mary Poppins Returns (The Park Keeper (Steve Nicolson))
- Maximum Conviction (Chris Blake (Michael Paré))
- Mother of Tears (Padre Johannes (Udo Kier))
- The Mummy (Colonel Greenway (Courtney B. Vance))
- Parker (Melander (Michael Chiklis))
- Perry Mason (Maynard Barnes (Stephen Root))
- Really Love (Isaiah Maxwell, Sr. (J. Arthur E. Brooks))
- Stand Up Guys (Richard Hirsch (Alan Arkin))
- Swamp Shark (Jason 'Swamp Thing' Bouchard (Jeff Chase))
- Thor (Agent Garrett (Dale Godboldo))
- Thor: Love and Thunder (Rapu (Jonny Brugh))
- Warrior (Officer "Big" Bill O'Hara (Kieran Bew))
- The Way Back (Dan (Al Madrigal))
- What's Your Number? (Mr. Darling (Ed Begley, Jr.))
- White Collar (Special Agent Clinton Jones (Sharif Atkins))
- Winter Sonata (Park Jong-ho)

==== Animation ====
- Motorcity (Abraham Kane)
- Wreck-It Ralph (Mr. Litwak)
- Ralph Breaks the Internet (Mr. Litwak)
