= Typhoon Graphics =

Japanese animation studio

Typhoon Graphics Co., Ltd.
- Logo used since 2024
- Native name: 株式会社颱風グラフィックス
- Romanized name: Kabushiki-gaisha Taifū Gurafikkusu
- Type: Kabushiki gaisha
- Industry: Japanese animation
- Founded: May 1, 2014; 12 years ago
- Headquarters: Nakacho, Musashino, Tokyo, Japan
- Number of employees: 38 (As of September 2024)
- Divisions: Maebashi Studio (Note: Typhoon Graphics Maebashi Studio (颱風グラフィックス前橋スタジオ), the studio's Maebashi branch located in Gunma Prefecture founded in June 3, 2024.)
- Website: typhoon-g.com

Typhoon Graphics Co., Ltd. (Japanese: 株式会社颱風グラフィックス, Hepburn: Kabushiki-gaisha Taifū Gurafikkusu) is a Japanese animation studio founded on May 1, 2014. The studio was founded by former Anime International Company (AIC) animation producer and editor Takashi Sakurai. Some of the studio's employees include ex-members from AIC's post-production department.

On July 24, 2026, Teikoku Databank reported that Typhoon Graphics had filed for civil rehabilitation proceedings with the Tokyo District Court on July 9 that same year, with the company's liabilities amounting to approximately ¥1.182 billion as of the end of the fiscal year that ended in April 2025.

== Works ==
=== Television series ===
| Title | Director(s) | First run start date | First run end date | Eps | Note(s) | Ref(s) |
|---|---|---|---|---|---|---|
| One Room | Shinichirō Ueda | January 11, 2017 | March 29, 2017 | 12 | Original work. | |
| Room Mate | Takashi Sakuma | April 12, 2017 | June 28, 2017 | 12 | Original work. | |
| Sengoku Night Blood | Katsuya Kikuchi | October 3, 2017 | December 26, 2017 | 12 | Based on a Japanese free-to-play otome game developed by Marvelous, Kadokawa, and Idea Factory's Otomate. | |
| Oh, Suddenly Egyptian God (season 2) | Katsuya Kikuchi | January 11, 2023 | March 15, 2023 | 10 | Sequel to Oh, Suddenly Egyptian God, broadcast by Tokyo MX. | |
| Why Raeliana Ended Up at the Duke's Mansion | Junichi Yamamoto | April 10, 2023 | June 26, 2023 | 12 | Based on a manhwa written by Milcha. | |
| My Daughter Left the Nest and Returned an S-Rank Adventurer | Takeshi Mori (Chief); Naoki Murata | October 6, 2023 | December 29, 2023 | 13 | Based on a light novel written by Mojikakiya. | |
| Dahlia in Bloom | Yōsuke Kubo | July 6, 2024 | September 21, 2024 | 12 | Based on a light novel written by Hisaya Amagishi. Co-animated with Imagica Infos. | |
| Haigakura | Junichi Yamamoto | October 7, 2024 | September 26, 2025 | 13 | Based on a manga written by Shinobu Takayama. | |
| Anyway, I'm Falling in Love with You | Junichi Yamamoto | January 10, 2025 | March 28, 2025 | 12 | Based on a manga written by Haruka Mitsui. | |
| The Water Magician | Hideyuki Satake | July 4, 2025 | September 26, 2025 | 12 | Based on a light novel written by Tadashi Kudou. Co-animated with Wonderland. | |
| Anyway, I'm Falling in Love with You (season 2) | Junichi Yamamoto | January 9, 2026 | March 27, 2026 | 12 | Sequel to Anyway, I'm Falling in Love with You. | |
| Champignon Witch | Yōsuke Kubo | January 9, 2026 | March 20, 2026 | 12 | Based on a manga written by Tachibana Higuchi. Co-animated with Qzil.la. | |

=== Original video animations ===
| Title | Director(s) | Release date | Eps | Note(s) | Ref(s) |
|---|---|---|---|---|---|
| One Room | Shinichirō Ueda | May 26, 2017 | 3 | OVA episodes for One Room. | |

=== Original net animations ===
| Title | Director(s) | Release date | Eps | Note(s) | Ref(s) |
|---|---|---|---|---|---|
| Oh, Suddenly Egyptian God | Katsuya Kikuchi | December 7, 2020 | 10 | Original work. | |
| Shiyakusho | —N/a | February 9, 2022 | 1 | Based on a manga written by Kishi Azumi. | |
