= The Water Magician (novel series) =

Japanese light novel series

- First light novel volume cover

水属性の魔法使い (Mizuzokusei no Mahōtsukai)
- Genre: Adventure, isekai
- Novel series
- Written by: Tadashi Kubō
- Published by: Shōsetsuka ni Narō
- Original run: April 1, 2020 – present
- Light novel
- Written by: Tadashi Kubō
- Illustrated by: Nokito (1–2); Mebaru (3–6); Hana Amano (7–)
- Published by: TO Books
- English publisher: NA: J-Novel Club
- Imprint: TO Bunko
- Original run: March 10, 2021 – present
- Volumes: 20
- Manga

Part 1
- Written by: Tadashi Kubō
- Illustrated by: Bokutengo
- Published by: TO Books
- English publisher: NA: J-Novel Club
- Imprint: Corona Comics
- Magazine: Comic Corona
- Original run: September 20, 2021 – present
- Volumes: 8
- Anime television series
- Directed by: Hideyuki Satake
- Written by: Jun Kumagai
- Music by: Akira Kosemura; Sayaka Aoki
- Studio: Typhoon Graphics; Wonderland
- Licensed by: Crunchyroll
- Original network: TBS, BS11
- Original run: July 4, 2025 – September 26, 2025
- Episodes: 12
- Manga

Part 2
- Written by: Tadashi Kubō
- Illustrated by: Kaworu Ōshima
- Published by: TO Books
- Imprint: Corona Comics
- Magazine: Corona EX
- Original run: July 7, 2025 – present
- Volumes: 2
- Manga

Gaiden: Penelopeia no Namida
- Written by: Tadashi Kubō
- Illustrated by: Yuchi Sumika
- Published by: TO Books
- Imprint: Corona Comics
- Magazine: Corona EX
- Original run: July 14, 2025 – present
- icon

The Water Magician (水属性の魔法使い, Mizuzokusei no Mahōtsukai) is a Japanese light novel series written by Tadashi Kubō and illustrated by Hana Amano. It initially began serialization on the user-generated novel publishing website Shōsetsuka ni Narō in April 2020. It was later acquired by TO Books who began publishing it under their TO Bunko imprint in March 2021. A manga adaptation illustrated by Bokutengo began serialization on the Nico Nico Seiga website under TO Books' Comic Corona brand on September 20, 2021. An anime television series adaptation produced by Typhoon Graphics and Wonderland aired from July to September 2025.

== Plot ==
Ryo, a man reincarnated into the fantasy world of Phi, is granted aptitude for water magic. Hoping to live a slow and peaceful life while studying magic, Ryō instead finds himself in an isolated and dangerous region filled with powerful monsters. Forced to rely on his ingenuity and growing magical ability to survive, he gradually refines his control over water magic while adapting to life in the wild.

Ryo slowly accumulates strength, aided by his optimistic personality and a rare trait that halts his physical aging. His long journey of survival and self-improvement eventually leads him to back to human society. His abilities begin to influence events on a much larger scale, which comes into conflict with his desire for a peaceful life.

== Characters ==
Ryō (涼)
Voiced by: Ayumu Murase (Japanese); Dallas Reid (English)
The main character of the series, Ryo is a Japanese man who dies at age 20 and is reincarnated in another world. He is given the powers of a water magician; along with a secret skill that makes him ageless. He trains in a distant land for 20 years before he travels to other lands, becoming an adventurer.
The reason his magic is stronger is that he doesn't waste it to create water/ice; scientific knowledge lets him use the existing moisture in the air.
Abel (アベル, Aberu)
Voiced by: Kazuki Ura (Japanese); Ben Stegmair (English)
Abel is an adventurer Ryo found washed up on the shore near his home. They travel to the nearest city. We learn he is the captain of the Crimson Blade party of adventurers.
Sera (セーラ)
Voiced by: Kaede Hondo (Japanese); Bryn Apprill (English)
Nils (ニルス, Nirusu)
Voiced by: Genki Muro (Japanese); Davon Oliver (English)
Eto (エト)
Voiced by: Naoya Miyase (Japanese); Eduardo Vildasol (English)
Amon (アモン)
Voiced by: Kōhei Amasaki (Japanese); Ciaran Strange (English)
Lihya (リーヒャ, Rīhya)
Voiced by: Kaori Ishihara (Japanese); Monica Rial (English)
Rin (リン)
Voiced by: Sara Matsumoto (Japanese); Lindsay Seidel (English)
Hugh McGrath (ヒュー・マクグラス, Hyū Makugurasu)
Voiced by: Satoshi Mikami (Japanese); Cris George (English)
Nina (ニーナ, Nīna)
Voiced by: Miku Itō (Japanese); Kara Edwards (English)
Michael (ミカエル, Mikaeru)
Voiced by: Takehito Koyasu (Japanese); Blake McNamara (English)
Lewin (ルウィン, Ruuin)
Voiced by: Hōchū Ōtsuka (Japanese); Barry Yandell (English)

== Media ==
=== Light novel ===
Written by Tadashi Kubō, The Water Magician initially began serialization on the user-generated novel publishing website Shōsetsuka ni Narō on April 1, 2020. It was later acquired by TO Books who began publishing it with illustrations by Nokito under their TO Bunko light novel imprint on March 10, 2021. Later volumes feature illustrations by Mebaru (for volumes 3 to 6) and Hana Amano (for volume 7 and onwards). Twenty volumes have been released as of October 15, 2026.

During their panel at Anime NYC 2023, J-Novel Club announced that they had licensed the series for English publication. In February 2026, J-Novel Club announced that the series would begin a print release in August 2026.

No.	Original release date	Original ISBN	North American release date	North American ISBN
Arc 1
1	March 10, 2021	978-4-86699-168-9	March 14, 2024 (digital); August 25, 2026 (print)	978-1-7183-3370-3 (digital); 978-1-7183-3697-1 (print)
2	June 19, 2021	978-4-86699-225-9	July 23, 2024 (digital); September 22, 2026 (print)	978-1-7183-3372-7 (digital); 978-1-7183-3698-8 (print)
3	November 20, 2021	978-4-86699-371-3	December 17, 2024 (digital); November 10, 2026 (print)	978-1-7183-3374-1 (digital); 978-1-7183-3699-5 (print)
4	March 10, 2022	978-4-86699-469-7	May 14, 2025 (digital); December 8, 2026 (print)	978-1-7183-3376-5 (digital); 978-1-7183-3701-5 (print)
5	August 20, 2022	978-4-86699-641-7	October 14, 2025 (digital); January 26, 2027 (print)	978-1-7183-3378-9 (digital); 978-1-7183-3703-9 (print)
6	February 20, 2023	978-4-86699-773-5	March 10, 2026 (digital); April 27, 2027 (print)	978-1-7183-3380-2 (digital); 978-1-7183-3705-3 (print)
7	July 20, 2023	978-4-86699-900-5	September 15, 2026 (digital)	978-1-7183-3382-6
Arc 2
8	October 20, 2023	978-4-86699-979-1	February 16, 2027 (digital)	978-1-7183-3384-0
9	January 15, 2024	978-4-86794-050-1	—	—
10	April 20, 2024	978-4-86794-164-5	—	—
11	July 16, 2024	978-4-86794-252-9	—	—
12	January 15, 2025	978-4-86794-426-4	—	—
Arc 3
13	March 19, 2025	978-4-86794-510-0	—	—
14	June 20, 2025	978-4-86794-600-8	—	—
15	July 15, 2025	978-4-86794-632-9	—	—
16	December 15, 2025	978-4-86794-803-3	—	—
17	February 15, 2026	978-4-86794-867-5	—	—
18	April 15, 2026	978-4-86794-978-8	—	—
19	July 15, 2026	978-4-86854-066-3	—	—
20	October 15, 2026	978-4-86854-166-0	—	—

=== Manga ===
A manga adaptation illustrated by Bokutengo began serialization on the Nico Nico Seiga website under TO Books' Comic Corona brand on September 20, 2021. The manga's chapters were collected into eight tankōbon volumes as of February 2026.

During their panel at Anime NYC 2023, J-Novel Club announced that they had also licensed the manga adaptation for English publication. In February 2026, J-Novel Club announced that a print release for the manga would begin in July 2026.

A manga adaptation of the second part of the novels illustrated by Kaworu Ōshima began serialization on TO Books' Corona EX manga website on July 7, 2025. Its chapters have been collected into two tankōbon volumes as of May 2026.

A spin-off manga illustrated by Yuchi Sumika titled The Water Magician Gaiden: Penelopeia no Namida began serialization on Corona EX on July 14, 2025.

==== Part 1 ====
No.	Original release date	Original ISBN	North American release date	North American ISBN
1	March 15, 2022	978-4-86699-475-8	February 14, 2024 (digital); July 14, 2026 (print)	978-1-7183-4051-0 (digital); 978-1-7183-4380-1 (print)
2	November 15, 2022	978-4-86699-708-7	April 17, 2024 (digital); October 27, 2026 (print)	978-1-7183-4053-4 (digital); 978-1-7183-4381-8 (print)
3	July 15, 2023	978-4-86699-904-3	January 15, 2025	978-1-7183-4055-8
4	January 15, 2024	978-4-86794-057-0	April 9, 2025	978-1-7183-4057-2
5	July 16, 2024	978-4-86794-239-0	December 31, 2025	978-1-7183-4059-6
6	January 15, 2025	978-4-86794-405-9	March 25, 2026	978-1-7183-4061-9
7	July 15, 2025	978-4-86794-621-3	June 17, 2026	978-1-7183-4063-3
8	February 15, 2026	978-4-86794-861-3	—	—

==== Part 2 ====
No.	Original release date	Original ISBN	North American release date	North American ISBN
1	September 15, 2025	978-4-86794-692-3	—	—
2	May 15, 2026	978-4-86854-000-7	—	—

=== Anime ===
An anime television series adaptation was announced on January 10, 2025. It is produced by Typhoon Graphics and Wonderland, and directed by Hideyuki Satake, with scripts written by Jun Kumagai, character designs by Yūka Kozutsumi, and music composed by Akira Kosemura and Sayaka Aoki. The series aired from July 4 to September 26, 2025, on TBS and BS11. (Note: TBS lists the series premiere on July 3, 2025, at 25:28, which is effectively July 4 at 1:28 a.m. JST.) The opening theme song is "Blue Motion" (ブルーモーション, Burū Mōshon), performed by Meiyo Densetsu, while the ending theme song is "Tayutau Mamani" (たゆたうままに; Sway as You Please), performed by Misaki. Crunchyroll is streaming the series.

==== Episodes ====
No.	Title	Directed by (Note: Production staff information is taken from the ending credits of each episode.)	Written by	Storyboarded by	Original release date
1	"The Slow, But Dangerous, Life"; Transliteration: "Kikenna Surō Raifu" (Japanese: 危険なスローライフ)	Takuma Suzuki	Jun Kumagai	Hideyuki Satake	July 4, 2025
After dying in an accident, a twenty-year-old Ryo Mihara meets an angel he dubs Michael. Michael informs him he has been chosen for reincarnation in another world called Phi to simply live as he pleases. He is also granted water magic and a house in Rondo Forest. Ryo devotes himself to mastering water magic. He goes exploring in the forest but encounters a Lesser Boar he manages to kill, and an Assassin Hawk, which escapes. As months pass Ryo begins to master water magic and encounter deadlier monsters. One day he encounters a Dullahan which defeats him yet does not kill him. Ryo realises for some reason the Dullahan is training him as it also uses water magic and gives him a water sword. The Assassin-Hawk returns, having evolved into a stronger form to get revenge. Ryo kills it but is grateful the Hawk helped him grow stronger. Soon after the red dragon, Lewin, appears, impressed Ryo killed the hawk. Lewin reveals the sword belongs to the Fairy King, so Ryo must have impressed him a lot. Ryo takes the opportunity to ask Lewin many questions about the world. Meanwhile, Michael is surprised Ryo reincarnated with the hidden ability of Eternal Youth.
2	"Abel the Castaway"; Transliteration: "Hyōryūsha Aberu" (Japanese: 漂流者アベル)	Hidehiko Kadota	Jun Kamagai	Hideyuki Satake, Takuma Suzuki & Kobayashi Hisanori	July 11, 2025 (Note: This episode aired at 1:58 a.m. JST, 30 minutes after the original air time on TBS.)
Ryo discovers a shipwreck and a young swordsman named Abel. Based on his ragged clothing Abel assumes Ryo is a hermit who can't afford clothes or even a wizards staff and takes it upon himself to protect Ryo from the dangerous forest. Abel plans to reunite with his friends in Lune village of the Knightley Kingdom but realizes the shipwreck carried him a long way down the coast so he has a long journey ahead. Ryo agrees to accompany Abel as his guide. Before leaving Ryo says goodbye to the Dullahan who gives him robes of a water magician. On their journey Abel eventually notices Ryo's magic is much stronger than he assumed, but his use of incantations is inconsistent. Abel explains along with Knightley there is the Debuhi Empire and Handalieu Federation. They defeat a nest of rock golems from which Ryo harvests a magic stone. Abel reveals this world contains even stranger monsters, dungeons, elves and dwarves. As they approach the mountains separating them from human lands they encounter a Gryphon, which luckily leaves peacefully, but Abel is shaken since monsters like Gryphons haven't been seen in centuries. They also encounter Wyverns, which are quickly taken down by Ryo, shocking Abel as it usually takes 20 adventurers to kill a single Wyvern.
3	"The Town of Lune"; Transliteration: "Run no Machi" (Japanese: ルンの街)	Tadao Okubo	Jun Kumagai	Tadao Okubo & Hideyuki Satake	July 18, 2025
After crossing the mountains they spend the night at Kailadi where Ryo learns curry and rice exists in Phi. The next day they reach Lune where everyone is grateful for Abel's return. An elf girl recognizes Ryo's water robe as belonging to the Fairy King. With Abel's endorsement Ryo registers as an adventurer and promoted directly to D rank. Guild-master Hugh is astounded Ryo hunted wyverns by himself as it would make him stronger than Abel, but Abel explains Ryo lives on the other side of the Malefic Mountains where all the strongest monsters come from. Abel meets his friends Lyn, Rihya and Warren of the Crimson Sword party. Guild-clerk Nina issues Ryo his guild licence and signs him up for a beginners class in adventuring. Based on cultural similarities Ryo suspects another Japanese person was reincarnated to Phi in the past. Ryo is given lodgings with adventurers Nils and Eto and fellow beginner Amon. Lyn refuses to believe Abel's description of Ryo's magic as it defies all common sense and is downright impossible. Rihya fears what might happen were Ryo to side with the Debuhi Empire, but Abel knows this is unlikely as Ryo has some strange aversion to the word Debuhi.
4	"Eclipses and Akuma"; Transliteration: "Nisshoku to Akuma" (Japanese: 日食と悪魔)	Takuma Suzuki	Jun Kumagai	Takuma Suzuki	July 25, 2025
After passing the beginner's class Ryo and the other beginners are invited to Lune Dungeon's first floor. Amon is extremely nervous but feels better after Ryo helps him slay his first monster. Ryo celebrates with Amon, Nils and Eto, who are amazed he is friends with Abel. Lyn and Rihya remain suspicious but Abel assures them they will see Ryo's powers soon enough. Ryo and Amon return to the dungeon and Ryo notices Amon's sword style is based on the Hume Style, the same as Abel's. In his free time Ryo visits Lune's library to begin learning alchemy. An eclipse darkens the sun, trapping Ryo in an alternate dimension named the Cloister. Ryo is attacked by an Akuma named Leonore who claims his power is too great to ignore so she must assassinate him. After a short duel Ryo drives her back by summoning acid rain. The eclipse passes and the Cloister starts to disappear so Leonore promises to see Ryo again as she hasn't enjoyed a battle so much in years. Ryo spots Amon, Nils and Eto being bullied by older adventurers led by Dan, all of whom Ryo beats up. Ryo decides he must learn about the Cloister and Leonore and if there may be other Akuma and what their plans are.
5	"The Great Tidal Bore"; Transliteration: "Ōtsunami" (Japanese: 大海嘯)	Mitsuo Hashimoto	Jun Kumagai	Yukio Nishimoto, Hideyuki Satake	August 1, 2025
Amon, Nils and Eto notice goblin archers on floor five where they shouldn't be. Ryo deduces Leonore's speed came from wind magic but when he tries to increase his own speed with water magic he fails. Lyn's research tells her Ryo's spells don't exist anywhere else. Nina is concerned about the goblins which do not normally appear before floor ten. Hugh decides to send Crimson Sword and White Brigade to investigate the possibility of a Great Tidal Bore; an explosive growth in the monster population that endangers Lune, since the dungeon entrance is in the centre of the city. Ryo visits the North Library to continue researching Akuma and encounters the elf he met before, named Sera. Before Abel and Phelps enter the dungeon they discover the Tidal Bore has already reached the first floor so Hugh mobilises all adventurer parties and city knights to defend the entrance. Ryo decides not to mention Akuma and instead tells Sera he is researching how to create golems, so she shows him some books that might be helpful. Tidal Bore escapes the dungeon and a massive battle ensues between goblins and the defenders. After a full day battle a Goblin King appears, so Crimson Sword and White Brigade kill it together to end the Tidal Bore. Phelps is impressed with Crimson Sword's abilities and teamwork.
6	"The Sealed Dungeon"; Transliteration: "Danjon Fūsa" (Japanese: ダンジョン封鎖)	Hidehiko Kadota	Jun Kumagai	Hidehiko Kadota	August 15, 2025
Hugh closes the dungeon for safety. Lyn is amazed Ryo doesn't need incantations because he invented his spells himself. Ryo hires Nils, Eto and Amon to find magic copper ore to learn alchemy. Ryo spots royal knights harassing citizens but they are dealt with by Phelps, revealed as son of Alexis Heinlein, former Royal Knight Commander. Ryo is attacked by adventurers from Jeclaire city but defeats them. Abel is curious who wants Ryo dead. The knights try to get revenge on Phelps but are incinerated by his subordinate Shenna. Royal Official Harold and Royal University representative Clive arrive to investigate Tidal Bore. A young woman named Natalie delivers Abel a message from Professor Hilarion asking him to support Harold's investigation, since after the last Tidal Bore an S Rank adventurer attempted the same investigation but disappeared. Also a water magician even Natalie has never heard of Ryo's spells. Abel warns his friends if they ever have to fight Ryo they should surrender but if they are ever in danger they should ask Ryo for help. Ryo is surprised the goblins killed during Tidal Bore had weak white magic crystals. Abel leads Harold, Clive and their teams to floor 38 where they discover a portal they name The Gate. The moment the gate is touched everyone instantly vanishes, shocking the mages on the surface remotely tracking their progress.
7	"Beyond the Gate"; Transliteration: "Mon no Saki de" (Japanese: 門の先で)	Osamu Subuta	Jun Kumagai	Toshihiko Masuda	August 22, 2025 (Note: This episode aired at 1:33 a.m. JST, 5 minutes after the original air time on TBS.)
The group materialise on floor 40, where no adventurer has ever reached before. Clive suspects this is where Tidal Bore came from and is determined to take credit for the discovery. Christopher of the College of Magic reports his teammates inside the dungeon were also teleported, meaning The Gate teleported everyone inside the dungeon regardless of what floor they were on. Ryo, with no idea what is going on, meets Sera in the library and confirms Tidal Bores always occur after solar eclipses. Sera confirms monster crystals darken with age, so if the Tidal Bore goblins had white crystals they were only days old. On floor 40 the group determines they are trapped in a magic barrier of unfathomable size, along with 50 unknown life forms. Hugh and Christopher agree they can't send a rescue team since they would either be teleported or die before reaching floor 40. The 50 life forms turn out to be Devils that begin slaughtering everyone. Abel organises a defence and they begin killing the Devils until their leader appears, a Demon Prince not yet awakened into a Demon Lord. Abel is overwhelmed in a one on one duel but Ryo suddenly appears and saves him. Abel is astounded when Ryo identifies the Demon Prince as weak, so he will kill it quickly so they can all go home.
8	"Unprecedented"; Transliteration: "Kikakugai" (Japanese: 規格外)	Tadao Okubo	Jun Kumagai	Romanov Higa	August 29, 2025
Ryo challenges the Demon Prince to a duel and cuts it into pieces with high pressure water jets, killing it instantly. Ryo wonders at the distinction between Devils and Leonore who called herself an Akuma. The Devils magic stones turn out to be black, indicating extreme age. Harold shares rumours that Devils possess Space-Time magic. Elsewhere, Leonore defeats the hero Roman and steals a Sacred Jewel. Roman is angered by her claim Ryo is far stronger than him. Ryo shows Harold a damaged crystal that had been maintaining an unknown spell. Harold reveals Ryo's unprecedented abilities to Hugh. Harold knows if Ryo's abilities became public the nobility won't be able to resist interfering with him, potentially turning him into an enemy, so Harold decides not to mention Ryo in any official paperwork. Sera reveals to Ryo she is employed by Margrave Lune as a sword instructor and invites him to duel her. Ryo is surprised to lose the duel but she is still amazed he is the strongest swordsman she has ever fought. She also asks him about the Fairy King who gave him his robe, revealing elves like her are half-fairies and even to them the Fairy King is a legendary character. As Ryo technically trespassed in the dungeon while it was officially closed Hugh punishes him with an important quest; escort merchants to Whitnash village.
9	"Nils and the Mysterious Town"; Transliteration: "Nirusu no Fushigi na Mura" (Japanese: ニルスの不思議な村)	Mitsuo Hashimoto	Jun Kumagai	Toshihiko Masuda	September 5, 2025
Nils reveals his hometown, Abali, has a quest for goblins and undead skeletons and asks Ryo for help. As the Whitnash job isn't for a few days Hugh lets Ryo go but warns him other parties have already failed because the people of Abali refused to let them fight. In Abali Nils talks to Mayor Boulan and learns the other parties tried to fight the skeletons in a sacred area. Nils explains the village is protected by a guardian beast living in the woods near a shrine. After successfully destroying the goblin nest the village elder, Nasu, informs them the village worships one of the six forgotten Goddesses, the Earth Mother. The guardian beast is a Fenrir named Nkuusin who reveals Fenrir are relatives of fairies, so he automatically likes Ryo as a student of the Fairy King. Nkuusin reveals the skeletons are guards for an Arch-Skeleton he imprisoned in the shrine. After destroying the Arch-Skeleton they discover the shrine has a statue of the Earth Mother holding a broken crystal. Nasu realises the crystal once protected Abali, but when it broke the shrine began turning into a dungeon that spawns skeletons. As such she seals the entrance with magic. Nils, Eto and Amon decide to buy a house together and invite Ryo to join them, though he is unsure. Hugh asks Abel to stand in for him at a festival in Whitnash. Elsewhere, an Imperial Commander and her subordinate also head to Whitnash by order of the Emperor.
10	"The Open Port Festival"; Transliteration: "Kaikōsai" (Japanese: 開港祭)	Yūya Okada	Jun Kumagai	Hideyuki Satake	September 12, 2025
Ryo sets out for Whitnash, as do Nils, Eto and Amon who are on the same quest after naming their party Room 10. After dropping the merchant in Whitnash they have 9 days to enjoy Whitnash's festival until the merchant's return trip. Meanwhile, the subordinate Oscar Luska, suspects the Emperor sent his commander, Princess Fiona, to Whitnash to keep her ignorant of his actions assassinating nobles who oppose him. Fiona resents being sent to Whitnash but is glad her brother Conrad also came along. Abel also arrives with his party. Rihya reveals Oscar is the Inferno Magician who became infamous after incinerating 1000 men and defeating a wyvern. Ryo and Oscar almost bump into each other and instinctively jump apart, making Oscar suspicious. Conrad encounters Abel and suspects he has seen him before. In Lune Sera is upset Ryo didn't tell her he would be gone so long. As part of the festival a new type of ship is revealed to the public powered entirely by wind and water magic instead of sails, the Rain Shooter. Hugh briefly attends the festival but returns to Lune the same day. To better help in combat Eto buys a repeating crossbow. Abel attends an evening party and meets Fiona. Men sabotage the wind shields protecting the party and infiltrate the house to attack Fiona.
11	"The Inferno Magician"; Transliteration: "Bakuen no Mahōtsukai" (Japanese: 爆炎の魔法使い)	Hidehiko Kadota	Jun Kumagai	Toshihiko Masuda, Hidehiko Kadota	September 19, 2025 (Note: This episode aired at 2:33 a.m. JST, 1 hour and 5 minutes after the original air time on TBS.)
As a child Oscar lived peacefully with his parents while using his fire magic to apprentice to a blacksmith who made him his first sword. When bandits attacked the village both his parents were killed by a bandit named Boskona, who stole his father's sword. Wolves were drawn in by the blood and killed the few survivors while Oscar fell into the river trying to escape. Another village found him and he was taken in by the Elder, Luke Rothko, who had him educated and trained with a sword. Years later, Boskona attacked again, killing Luke with the sword stolen from Oscar's father. In the present Abel meets Whitnash's Lord to discuss starting an adventurer training programme, with Hugh having promised to supply instructors that have passed the programme in Lune. During the attack on the party Fiona gets Conrad to safety and manages to send an emergency spell to Oscar signalling they are under attack. Oscar arrives in time to witness an attacker cast explosion magic under Fiona's feet, blasting her over a cliff. Luckily, Nils, Eto and Amon were on the beach below the cliff and manage to catch her as well as killing the attackers that followed her down. Oscar appears immediately afterwards.
12	"Ryo Returns Home"; Transliteration: "Ryō no Kiro" (Japanese: 涼の帰路)	Kobayashi Hisanori	Jun Kumagai	Hideyuki Satake, Kobayashi Hisanori	September 26, 2025
Oscar mistakes Nils, Eto and Amon for attackers and tries to kill them. Ryo intervenes and fights Oscar. Abel tries to explain the misunderstanding but Ryo provokes Oscar further for injuring his friends. Abel gets between them and demands they stop before they start a war between their countries. Oscar leaves with Fiona. Abel and Conrad agree it was an unfortunate misunderstanding, but Abel remains disappointed with Ryo. Fiona rewards Nils, Eto and Amon for saving her life. Ryo decides to return to Lune where Sera quickly recovers from her depression and takes him to the Forbidden Archives to see the alchemical texts. Abel sees them and is surprised they know each other. Sera becomes jealous Ryo is casual with Abel and yet is still formal with her. Ryo asks Abel for help finding a large house with a garden so he can begin experimenting with alchemy. Due to certain noble restrictions Ryo is only offered a farmhouse outside the city walls, which he buys without delay. Meanwhile, the angel Michael is certain that now Ryo and Oscar have fought once they are destined to do so again on a much grander scale, so the peaceful life Ryo wanted is unlikely to last much longer.

== Reception ==
Lauren Orsini of Anime News Network gave the first light novel volume a score of 2/5 stars, writing, "Did anyone else read My Side of the Mountain by Jean Craighead George when they were a kid and vowed to run away from home and live a self-sufficient life in the forest along with their trusty pet hawk? That's a high I've been chasing since childhood, and I nearly found it between the pages of The Water Magician." She added, "So Ryo comes with [Abel], and the pair battle their way through the jungle, and then the mountains, until they reach the Adventurer's Guild, turn in the magic stones they found in all those wyverns they one-shotted, level up their ranks, and oh look, it's suddenly a very cookie-cutter isekai story that you could find anywhere... You also won't be surprised to hear that Ryo is (yawn) the strongest person in the Adventurer's Guild. So much for this story's strong start. This is only the first volume, but I won't be reading the second."

On the website "goodreads": first volume has a 4.19/5 rating based upon 522 total votes.
