= One Room =

Japanese original short anime television series

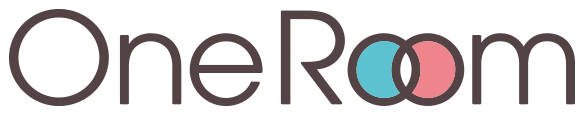
- Genre: Romance
- Anime television series
- Directed by: Takashi Sakuma (season 1); Shinichirō Ueda (seasons 2–3)
- Produced by: Hiroshi Gotō; Ryōhei Suzuki; Shūichi Suzuki; Yūta Kashiwabara
- Written by: Eiji Mano
- Music by: Yamazo
- Studio: Typhoon Graphics (season 1); Zero-G (season 2–3)
- Licensed by: NA: Crunchyroll
- Original network: Tokyo MX, Sun TV, BS NTV
- Original run: January 11, 2017 – December 21, 2020
- Episodes: 36 + 3 OVA
- Anime television series

Room Mate
- Directed by: Takashi Sakuma
- Produced by: Hiroshi Gotō; Ryōhei Suzuki; Shūichi Suzuki
- Written by: Eiji Mano
- Music by: Yamazo
- Studio: Typhoon Graphics
- Original network: Tokyo MX, Sun TV
- Original run: April 12, 2017 – June 28, 2017
- Episodes: 12
- icon

One Room is a Japanese original short anime television series produced by SMIRAL and animated by Typhoon Graphics. One Room is presented as a first-person narrative; the audience is the male protagonist. The anime has three different stories/routes, each with a different girl, in one room. The anime aired from January 11 to March 29, 2017. A second season by Zero-G aired from July 3 to September 25, 2018. A third season aired from October 5 to December 21, 2020.

The male characters version intended for female audiences titled Room Mate aired from April to June 2017.

== Characters ==
=== One Room ===
Male Protagonist (Momohara)
A man who moved to Tokyo for his job and moved into the apartment next-door to Yui's.
Yui Hanasaka (花坂結衣, Hanasaka Yui)
Voiced by: M·A·O
A 17-year-old third-year high school girl from Hokkaido who goes to Tokyo to take her college entrance exams and temporarily lives with her older sister.
Natsuki Momohara (桃原奈月, Momohara Natsuki)
Voiced by: Rie Murakawa
Natsuki is a 14-year-old middle school student and the protagonist's younger sister who came to Tokyo for summer vacation and stays at his apartment.
Moka Aoshima (青島萌香, Aoshima Moka)
Voiced by: Suzuko Mimori
A 21-year-old singer-songwriter. She made her debut as a singer once but, since she was unable to follow up, she ends up working as a part-timer in Tokyo while chasing her dream. She and the protagonist are childhood friends and they reunited by chance in Tokyo.
Minori Nanahashi (七橋御乃梨, Nanahashi Minori)
Voiced by: Rie Takahashi
Mashiro Amatsuki (天月真白, Amatsuki Mashiro)
Voiced by: Inori Minase
A gymnast who was retired, and tried to look for a new job. She and the protagonist were neighbors as they lived in the same apartment, though she regarded him as a pervert for taking pictures of her during practice. Afterwards, she thanked him for helping her find employment.
Akira Kotokawa (琴川晶, Kotokawa Akira)
Voiced by: Miyu Tomita
A cheerful 15-year-old girl who likes agriculture and gardening, and is actively in the Gardening Club with the male protagonist. Before then, she was not the most sociable person and she tried to use gardening as some sort of escape from reality and an excuse for isolation.
Saya Orisaki (織崎紗耶, Orisaki Saya)
Voiced by: Yumiri Hanamori
A 24-year-old office worker who likes to refer to herself as "Onee-san" (Big Sister). She lives in an apartment.

=== Room Mate ===
Female Protagonist
A woman who is the new manager at the dormitory where Takumi Ashihara, Aoi Nishina, and Shinya Miyasaka live.
Takumi Ashihara (葦原 巧, Ashihara Takumi)
Voiced by: Tomoaki Maeno
A 19-year-old college school student who loves sport climbing. Although the first impression of him gives a "too-cool-for-you" vibe, he's a gentleman who cares about others.
Aoi Nishina (仁科 葵, Nishina Aoi)
Voiced by: Natsuki Hanae
A 17-year-old high school student stage actor whose parents are working overseas. He has a bright personality-- but he has a habit where sometimes he gets too much into his role.
Shinya Miyasaka (宮坂 真也, Miyasaka Shinya)
Voiced by: Kosuke Toriumi
A 25-year-old elite businessman who works in a famous company. He has an arrogant, pompous, and sadistic personality, but deeply cares about Takumi and Aoi as if they were his own brothers.

== Media ==
=== Anime ===
One Room and Room Mate (tentatively titled One Room: Side M) were first announced by Entertainment label SMIRAL who started a website on Friday to announce that it is producing an original anime series of shorts that premiered in Japan in January. It consisted of 12 episodes, each 5 to 6 minutes long. Eiji Mano wrote the original story and Aose Shimoi wrote the scripts. Jin'nan Studio produced the sounds while F.M.F produced the music with the composition by Yamazo. Both One Room and Room Mate premiered on Tokyo MX with the following broadcast on Sun TV and online streaming via Niconico and AbemaTV.

One Room features an original design by Kantoku, while Yasuhiro Okuda is adapting the design into anime. The anime was first aired on January 11, 2017, on Tokyo MX and Sun TV along with online streaming via Niconico then finished on March 29, 2017. MAO sung the opening theme for episodes 1–4 titled "Harumachi Clover" (春待ちクローバー), Rie Murakawa for episodes 6–8 titled "Natsuzora Yell" (夏空エール), and Suzuko Mimori for the last four episodes titled "Kibō Refrain" (希望リフレイン). A Blu-ray and DVD compilation containing all the 12 episodes and 3 unaired episodes will be released on May 26, 2017.

A second season of the One Room anime television series began airing on July 2, 2018, and finished on September 25, 2018. However, it was announced that Zero-G will replace Typhoon Graphics as the animation studio. In addition, Takuya Tani will be the new character designer and chief animation director, Shinji Takasuka will be joining as the art director, and Atsushi Furukawa will be the new color designer.

A third season has been announced, and aired from October 5 to December 21, 2020. The staff from the second season is returning to produce the third season.

The "side M" version titled Room Mate features Hidari as an original character designer, with Chisato Nakata adapting Hidari's art into animation. It aired from April 12 to June 28, 2017. The anime's theme song titled "Kimi Iro Smile" (君色スマイル) is performed by Kosuke Toriumi and Tomoaki Maeno (from episode 5), and Natsuki Hanae (from episode 9) Crunchyroll addes the anime series to its streaming service. A Blu-ray and DVD compilation containing all 12 episodes was released on August 25, 2017.

==== Season 1 ====
No. in season	Title (Note: All English titles are taken from Crunchyroll.)	Character arc	Original release date
1	"Hanasaka Yui Makes a Request" "Hanasaka Yui wa onegai suru" (花坂結衣はお願いする)	Yui Hanasaka Part 1	January 11, 2017
2	"Hanasaka Yui Makes a Promise" "Hanasaka Yui wa yakusoku suru" (花坂結衣は約束する)	Yui Hanasaka Part 2	January 18, 2017
3	"Hanasaka Yui Dozes Off" "Hanasaka Yui wa neochi suru" (花坂結衣は寝落ちする)	Yui Hanasaka Part 3	January 25, 2017
4	"Holding Hands With Hanasaka Yui" "Hanasaka Yui wa te o tsunaide" (花坂結衣は手をつないで)	Yui Hanasaka Part 4	February 1, 2017
5	"Momohara Natsuki Meddles" "Momohara Natsuki wa sewa o yaku" (桃原奈月は世話を焼く)	Natsuki Momohara Part 1	February 8, 2017
6	"Momohara Natsuki Blushes" "Momohara Natsuki wa hotto suru" (桃原奈月はほっとする)	Natsuki Momohara Part 2	February 15, 2017
7	"Momohara Natsuki Gets Embarrassed and Plays Things Off" "Momohara Natsuki wa terete gomakasu" (桃原奈月は照れてごまかす)	Natsuki Momohara Part 3	February 22, 2017
8	"Momohara Natsuki Can't be Honest" "Momohara Natsuki wa sunao ni narenai" (桃原奈月は素直になれない)	Natsuki Momohara Part 4	March 1, 2017
9	"Aoshima Moka Remembers" "Aoshima Moka wa oboeteru" (青島萌香は覚えてる)	Moka Aoshima Part 1	March 8, 2017
10	"Aoshima Moka Is Troubled" "Aoshima Moka wa nayanderu" (青島萌香は悩んでる)	Moka Aoshima Part 2	March 15, 2017
11	"Aoshima Moka Understands" "Aoshima Moka wa wakatteru" (青島萌香はわかってる)	Moka Aoshima Part 3	March 22, 2017
12	"Aoshima Moka Is Singing" "Aoshima Moka wa utatteru" (青島萌香は歌ってる)	Moka Aoshima Part 4	March 29, 2017
13	"Hanasaka Yui Greets in Swimsuit" "Hanasaka Yui wa mizugi de aisatsu suru" (花坂結衣は水着で挨拶する)	Yui Hanasaka Part 5	May 26, 2017
14	"Momohara Natsuki Is Cleaning in Swimsuit" "Momohara Natsuki wa mizugi de o sōji suru" (桃原奈月は水着でお掃除する)	Natsuki Momohara Part 5	May 26, 2017
15	"Aoshima Moka Works Hard in Swimsuit" "Aoshima Moka wa mizugi de ganbaru" (青島萌香は水着で頑張る)	Moka Aoshima Part 5	May 26, 2017

==== Season 2 ====
No. in season	Title (Note: All English titles are taken from Crunchyroll.)	Character arc	Original release date
0	"Hanasaka Yui's Prologue" "Hanasaka Yui no Purorōgu" (花坂結衣のプロローグ)	Yui Hanasaka Part 1	July 3, 2018
1	"Hanasaka Yui Is Excited" "Hanasaka Yui wa hashai deru" (花坂結衣ははしゃいでる)	Yui Hanasaka Part 2	July 10, 2018
2	"Hanasaka Yui Gets Scolded" "Hanasaka Yui wa shikarareru" (花坂結衣は叱られる)	Yui Hanasaka Part 3	July 17, 2018
3	"Hanasaka Yui Is Sulking" "Hanasaka Yui wa sunete iru" (花坂結衣は拗ねている)	Yui Hanasaka Part 4	July 24, 2018
4	"Hanasaka Yui Is Near Me" "Hanasaka Yui wa soba ni iru" (花坂結衣はそばにいる)	Yui Hanasaka Part 5	July 31, 2018
5	"Nanahashi Minori Comes to Wake You Up" "Nanahashi Minori wa okoshi ni kuru" (七橋御乃梨は起こしに来る)	Nanahashi Minori Part 1	August 7, 2018
6	"Nanahashi Minori Has a Heart-to-Heart" "Nanahasi Minori wa shinmiri suru" (七橋御乃梨はしんみりする)	Nanahashi Minori Part 2	August 14, 2018
7	"Nanahashi Minori Asks For the Impossible" "Nanahasi Minori wa mucha o iu" (七橋御乃梨は無茶を言う)	Nanahashi Minori Part 3	August 21, 2018
8	"Nanahashi Minori Is Right Here" "Nanahashi Minori wa koko ni iru" (七橋御乃梨はここにいる)	Nanahashi Minori Part 4	August 28, 2018
9	"Amatsuki Mashiro Is Searching" "Amatsuki Mashiro wa sagashi teru" (天月真白は探してる)	Amatsuki Mashiro Part 1	September 4, 2018
10	"Amatsuki Mashiro Gives It a Try" "Amatsuki Mashiro wa yatte miru" (天月真白はやってみる)	Amatsuki Mashiro Part 2	September 11, 2018
11	"Amatsuki Mashiro Remembers" "Amatsuki Mashiro wa omoidasu" (天月真白は思い出す)	Amatsuki Mashiro Part 3	September 18, 2018
12	"Amatsuki Mashiro Is Waiting" "Amatsuki Mashiro wa matte iru" (天月真白は待っている)	Amatsuki Mashiro Part 4	September 25, 2018

==== Room Mate ====
No. in season	Title (Note: All English titles are taken from Crunchyroll.)	Character arc	Original release date
1	"The Room Mates Welcome You" "Rūmumeito wa kangei suru" (ルームメイトは歓迎する)	–	April 12, 2017
2	"Ashihara Takumi Is Climbing" "Ashihara Takumi wa nobotteru" (葦原巧は登ってる)	Takumi Ishihara Part 1	April 19, 2017
3	"Nishina Aoi Relaxes" "Nishina Aoi wa anshin suru" (仁科葵は安心する)	Aoi Nishina Part 1	April 26, 2017
4	"Miyasaka Shinya Is Displeased" "Miyasaka Shinya wa akireteru" (宮坂真也は呆れてる)	Shinya Miyasaka Part 1	May 3, 2017
5	"The Room Mates' Day Off" "Rūmumeito no kyūjitsu" (ルームメイトの休日)	–	May 10, 2017
6	"Ashihara Takumi Can't Climb" "Ashihara Takumi wa noborarenai" (葦原巧は登れない)	Takumi Ashihara Part 2	May 17, 2017
7	"Nishina Aoi Can't Calm Down" "Nishina Aoi wa ochitsukanai" (仁科葵は落ち着かない)	Aoi Nishina Part 2	May 24, 2017
8	"Miyasaka Shinya Can't Sleep" "Miyasaka Shinya wa nemurenai" (宮坂真也は眠れない)	Sinya Miyasaka Part 2	May 31, 2017
9	"The Goddess Statue Knows" "Joshinzō wa shitteiru" (女神像は知っている)	–	June 7, 2017
10	"The Room Mates Compete" "Rūmumeito wa shōbu suru" (ルームメイトは勝負する)	–	June 14, 2017
11	"The Room Mates Make a Decision" "Rūmumeito wa ketsudan suru" (ルームメイトは決断する)	–	June 21, 2017
12	"Waiting for the Room Mates" "Rūmumeito wo matteiru" (ルームメイトを待っている)	–	June 28, 2017

==== Season 3 ====
No. in season	Title (Note: All English titles are taken from Crunchyroll.)	Character arc	Original release date
1	"Kotokawa Akira is Clingy" "Kotokawa Akira wa natsuiteru" (琴川晶はなついてる)	Akira Kotokawa Part 1	October 16, 2020
2	"Kotokawa Akira is Worried about It" "Kotokawa Akira wa ki ni shiteru" (琴川晶は気にしてる)	Akira Kotokawa Part 2	October 13, 2020
3	"Kotokawa Akira Can't Say It" "Kotokawa Akira wa iezu ni iru" (琴川晶は言えずにいる)	Akira Kotokawa Part 3	October 20, 2020
4	"Kotokawa Akira is Nurturing" "Kotokawa Akira wa sodateteru" (琴川晶は育ててる)	Akira Kotokawa Part 4	October 27, 2020
5	"Momohara Natsuki is Convincing" "Momohara Natsuki wa settoku suru" (桃原奈月は説得する)	Natsuki Momohara Part 6	November 3, 2020
6	"Nanahashi Minori Will Keep Walking" "Nanahashi Minori wa aruiteku" (七橋御乃梨は歩いてく)	Nanahashi Minori Part 5	November 10, 2020
7	"Orisaki Saya Apologizes" "Orisaki Saya wa shazai suru" (織崎紗耶は謝罪する)	Saya Orisaki Part 1	November 17, 2020
8	"Orisaki Saya is Cheering You On" "Orisaki Saya wa ouen shiteru" (織崎紗耶は応援してる)	Saya Orisaki Part 2	November 24, 2020
9	"Orisaki Saya Takes a Hint" "Orisaki Saya wa sasshiteru" (織崎紗耶は察してる)	Saya Orisaki Part 3	December 1, 2020
10	"Orisaki Saya Comes Over" "Orisaki Saya wa ojama suru" (織崎紗耶はお邪魔する)	Saya Orisaki Part 4	December 8, 2020
11	"Hanasaka Yui is Startled" "Hanasaka Yui wa bikkuri suru" (花坂結衣はびっくりする)	Yui Hanasaka Part 6	December 15, 2020
12	"Hanasaka Yui is Next to Me" "Hanasaka Yui wa tonari ni iru" (花坂結衣は隣にいる)	Yui Hanasaka Part 7	December 22, 2020
