= Oh, Suddenly Egyptian God =

Japanese original net animation (ONA) series

- Season 1 key visual

とーとつにエジプト神 (Tōtotsu ni Egypt Kami)
- Genre: Comedy
- Other book
- Written by: yuka
- Published by: Frontier Works
- Published: April 15, 2020
- Volumes: 1
- Original net animation
- Directed by: Katsuya Kikuchi
- Written by: yuka
- Music by: Keiji Inai
- Studio: Typhoon Graphics
- Licensed by: Crunchyroll: SEA: Muse Communication
- Released: December 7, 2020 – February 8, 2021
- Runtime: 6 minutes
- Episodes: 10
- Anime television series

Oh, Suddenly Egyptian God 2nd Season
- Directed by: Katsuya Kikuchi
- Produced by: Takashi Sakurai
- Written by: yuka
- Music by: Keiji Inai
- Studio: Typhoon Graphics
- Original network: Tokyo MX, DMM TV
- Original run: January 11, 2023 – March 15, 2023
- Episodes: 10

Oh, Suddenly Egyptian God (Japanese: とーとつにエジプト神, Hepburn: Tōtotsu ni Egypt Kami) is a Japanese original net animation (ONA) series produced by Japanese studio Typhoon Graphics. This anime is based on Egyptian mythology and the original character designs drawn by yuka. His illustrations have become popular on SNS in Japan and is known for its simplistic and cute-looking designs. A picture book based on the characters was published by Frontier Works. The first season started airing on December 7, 2020, up to February 8, 2021.

== Cast ==
- Hiro Shimono as Anubis
- Yuki Kaji as Thoth
- Yū Kobayashi as Bastet
- Hikaru Midorikawa as Medjed
- Nobunaga Shimazaki as Horus
- Kōji Yusa as Apep
- Daisuke Namikawa as Khnum
- Kenjiro Tsuda as Ra
- Yukari Tamura as Sa-ta (Based on the Egyptian God Nehebkau)
- Hiroyuki Yoshino as Set
- Junichi Suwabe as Sobek
- Shouta Aoi as Wenet
- Tomoya Nakamura as the narrator

== Media ==
=== Book ===
| No. | Japanese release date | Japanese ISBN |
|---|---|---|
| 1 | April 15, 2020 | 978-4-86657-322-9 |

=== Anime ===
This anime series is produced by Typhoon Graphics and Frontier Works, originally created by yuka. Directed by Katsuya Kikuchi, series composition by Yuuichirou Higashide, character design and chief animation direction by Suzuna Okuyama, music by Keiji Inai. Crunchyroll licensed the series outside of Asia. On August 1, 2021, it was announced that the anime will receive a second season. Junichi Suwabe was cast in October 2022 as the voice actor for Sobek, the Egyptian god associated with the Nile crocodile. The second season started on Tokyo MX and DMM TV at 1 a.m. January 11, 2023. (Note: The broadcast time is 25:00 on January 10, 2023, which is effectively 1:00 a.m. JST on January 11.) Other networks and websites will launch on January 15.
