= Frontier Works =

Japanese Anime producer and distributor

Frontier Works, Inc.
- Native name: 株式会社フロンティアワークス
- Romanized name: Kabushiki-gaisha Furontia Wākusu
- Type: Subsidiary KK
- Industry: Japanese animation
- Founded: August 2002; 24 years ago
- Headquarters: Higashiikebukuro, Toshima, Tokyo, Japan
- Parent: Animate
- Subsidiaries: Yokohama Animation Laboratory
- Website: www.fwinc.co.jp

Frontier Works (株式会社フロンティアワークス, Kabushiki Gaisha Furontia Wākusu) is a Japanese company specializing in the creation and distribution of media related to animation, such as producing OVAs, radio dramas, drama CDs, animation soundtracks, or other related products. The company was established in August 1990.

On September 5, 2025, it was announced that Frontier Works acquired anime studio Yokohama Animation Laboratory.

== Projects involved with ==
=== Animation ===
- Air
- Apparently, Disillusioned Adventurers Will Save the World
- Binbō Shimai Monogatari
- Comic Party
- Clannad
- Esper Mami
- Gun Parade March: Arata Naru Kōgen Uta
- Hetalia: Axis Powers
- Higurashi no Naku Koro ni
- Jewelpet Twinkle
- Karin
- Maria-sama ga Miteru
- Marmalade Boy
- No-Rin
- Oh, Suddenly Egyptian God
- Papuwa
- Saiunkoku Monogatari
- Saiyuki Reload
- Tactics
- The Mythical Detective Loki Ragnarok
- To Heart
- To Heart 2
- Tsuki wa Higashi ni Hi wa Nishi ni: Operation Sanctuary
- Wind: A Breath of Heart
- Yurikuma Arashi
- Zettai Muteki Raijin-Oh

=== OVA ===
- Aki Sora
- Mizuiro
- Saint Beast
- Utawarerumono

=== Soundtracks ===
- Lucky Star series
- Maria-sama ga Miteru 1 series
- Clannad Film Soundtrack (2007)

=== Drama CDs ===
- Akaya Akashiya Ayakashi no
- Black Butler
- Cat Paradise
- Drama CD Lucky Star
- DJCD Maria-sama ga Miteru
- Higurashi no Naku Koro ni
- Kamui
- Karneval Carnival
- Maria Holic
- Pandora Hearts Drama CD
- Sekirei Original Drama CD
- Servamp
- Shoulder-a-Coffin Kuro
- Taishō Baseball Girls: Young Ladies Hiking
- DJCD The Idolmaster
- Tasogare Otome × Amunejia Original Drama CD
- Triggerheart Exelica Parallel Anchor
- Venus Versus Virus
- Yandere Kanojo

=== Game(s) ===
- Dimension Tripper Neptune: TOP NEP

=== Magazines ===
- Daria
