= List of Bartender chapters =

The Japanese manga series Bartender was written by Araki Joh and illustrated by Kenji Nagatomo. It was first published in Shueisha's magazine Super Jump between May 2004 and September 2011, and in Grand Jump from November and December 2011. The chapters were collected and published into twenty-one tankōbon volumes by Shueisha starting on December 3, 2004, with the last volume being released on February 17, 2012. The manga has also been licensed in South Korea by Haksan Publishing, and in Taiwan by Sharp Point Press.

Three spin-off series, written by Joh and illustrated by Osamu Kajisa, were produced. The first, titled Bartender à Paris, started to be serialized in Grand Jump on January 4, 2012. It was collected into six volumes; the first was published on June 19, 2012, and the last on December 19, 2013. On November 6, 2013, a follow-up, Bartender à Tokyo, commenced to be serialized in the same magazine. Its eight collected volumes were published in Japan between April 18, 2014, and October 19, 2016. Both Bartender à Paris and Bartender à Tokyo were licensed in South Korea by Haksan Publishing and in Taiwan by Sharp Point Press. The third spin-off, Bartender 6stp, started on Grand Jump Premium on August 24, 2016. The latter first volume was published on March 17, 2017, while the last and fourth volume was released on February 19, 2020.

== Volumes ==
=== Bartender ===
No.	Title	Release date	ISBN
1	Yasashī Tomariki (優しい止まり木)	December 3, 2004	978-4-08-859454-5
2	Kanpeki na Aji (完璧な味)	May 2, 2005	978-4-08-859495-8
3	Bā no Kao (バーの顔)	September 2, 2005	978-4-08-859528-3
4	Tabibito no Tame no Ippai (旅人のための一杯)	January 5, 2006	978-4-08-859553-5
5	One for the Road	May 2, 2006	978-4-08-859575-7
6	Hamaki no Kemuri (葉巻の煙)	October 4, 2006	978-4-08-859599-3
7	Matīni no Kao (マティーニの顔)	January 4, 2007	978-4-08-859616-7
8	Īden Hōru no Kōun (イーデンホールの幸運)	May 2, 2007	978-4-08-859638-9
9	Saisho no 'Kyaku' (最初の「客」)	September 4, 2007	978-4-08-859666-2
10	Tayutae Domo Dhizumazu (たゆたえども沈まず)	February 4, 2008	978-4-08-859688-4
11	Sorezore no Tenki (それぞれの転機)	May 2, 2008	978-4-08-859707-2
12	Kurosu Rōdo (クロス・ロード)	October 2, 2008	978-4-08-859732-4
13	Shippai no Yasashi-sa (失敗の優しさ)	February 4, 2009	978-4-08-859758-4
14	Kenpai (献杯)	July 3, 2009	978-4-08-859786-7
15	Kako (過去)	November 4, 2009	978-4-08-859799-7
16	Takedzuru Rita no Monogatari (竹鶴・リタの物語)	March 4, 2010	978-4-08-859827-7
17	Asu e no Tobira (明日への扉)	August 4, 2010	978-4-08-859844-4
18	Bā no Takaramono (バーの宝物)	December 29, 2010	978-4-08-859866-6
19	Tabidachi (旅立ち)	March 18, 2011	978-4-08-859879-6
20	Yoi Hito (善い人)	September 2, 2011	978-4-08-859894-9
21	Sayonara no Oshie (サヨナラの教え)	February 17, 2012	978-4-08-858786-8

=== Bartender à Paris ===
No.	Release date	ISBN
1	June 19, 2012	978-4-08-879363-4
2	October 19, 2012	978-4-08-879448-8
3	January 18, 2013	978-4-08-879510-2
4	June 19, 2013	978-4-08-879606-2
5	September 19, 2013	978-4-08-879656-7
6	December 12, 2013	978-4-08-879728-1

=== Bartender à Tokyo ===
No.	Release date	ISBN
1	April 18, 2014	978-4-08-879822-6
2	August 20, 2014	978-4-08-879893-6
3	December 19, 2014	978-4-08-890096-4
4	April 17, 2015	978-4-08-890193-0
5	August 19, 2015	978-4-08-890250-0
6	November 19, 2015	978-4-08-890334-7
7	April 19, 2016	978-4-08-890404-7
8	October 19, 2016	978-4-08-890550-1

=== Bartender 6stp ===
No.	Release date	ISBN
1	March 17, 2017	978-4-08-890601-0
2	February 19, 2018	978-4-08-890867-0
3	February 19, 2019	978-4-08-891222-6
4	February 19, 2020	978-4-08-891558-6
