= Liber (studio) =

Japanese animation studio

Liber, Inc.
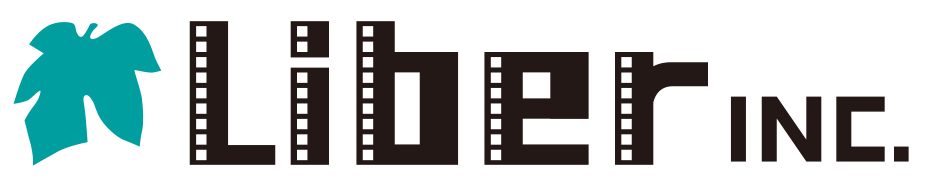
- Native name: 株式会社リーベル
- Romanized name: Kabushiki-gaisha Rīberu
- Type: Kabushiki-gaisha
- Industry: Japanese animation
- Founded: August 23, 2019; 7 years ago
- Headquarters: Igusa, Suginami, Tokyo, Japan
- Key people: Sachiya Sakikawa (CEO); Hiroshi Negishi (director); Takeshi Mochimaru (director)
- Parent: Saber Project
- Website: liber-inc.jp

Liber, Inc. (Japanese: 株式会社リーベル, Hepburn: Kabushiki-gaisha Rīberu) is a Japanese animation studio based in Suginami founded in 2019 as part of the Saber Project group.

== Works ==
=== Television series ===
Title	Director(s)	First run start date	First run end date	Eps	Note(s)	Ref(s)
The Ice Guy and His Cool Female Colleague	Mankyū	January 4, 2023	March 22, 2023	12	Based on a manga by Miyuki Tonogaya. Co-produced with Zero-G.	
Bartender: Glass of God	Ryōichi Kuraya	April 4, 2024	June 20, 2024	12	Based on a manga by Araki Joh.	
Grand Blue Dreaming (season 2)	Shinji Takamatsu	July 8, 2025	September 23, 2025	12	Based on a manga written by Kenji Inoue. Co-produced with Zero-G.	
Mechanical Marie	Junji Nishimura	October 5, 2025	December 21, 2025	12	Based on a manga written by Aki Akimoto. Co-produced with Zero-G.	
The Record of a Fallen Vampire	Mankyū	2027	TBA	TBA	Based on a manga written by Kyo Shirodaira. Co-produced with Zero-G.	
