= Chiaki Kobayashi =

Japanese voice actor

- 小林 千晃
- Born: June 4, 1994 (age 32); Kanagawa, Japan
- Occupation: Voice actor
- Years active: 2017–present
- Agent: Office Osawa
- Awards: Best New Actor Award at the 15th Seiyu Awards

Chiaki Kobayashi (小林 千晃, Kobayashi Chiaki; born June 4, 1994) is a Japanese voice actor affiliated with Office Osawa. His roles include Hiroto Kuga in Gundam Build Divers Re:Rise, Deuce Spade in Disney: Twisted-Wonderland, Makoto Edamura in Great Pretender, Langa Hasegawa in SK8 the Infinity, Gabimaru in Hell's Paradise: Jigokuraku, Mash Burnedead in Mashle: Magic and Muscles, Stark in Frieren: Beyond Journey's End, Calist in Princession Orchestra, Tsubasa Igarashi in The Ramparts of Ice, Yoshiki Tsujinaka in The Summer Hikaru Died, and Okuto Nakamura in Go For It, Nakamura!!.

== Filmography ==
=== Television animation ===
List of voice performances in anime
Year	Title	Role	Notes
2017	Case Closed	Baseball club junior, Junior high school boy	
2017	Just Because!	Junior high school boy	
2017	The Idolmaster SideM	Boy	
2018	A Place Further than the Universe	Host	
2018	Butlers: Chitose Momotose Monogatari	Kyoichi Sano	
2018	Cells at Work!	Killer T cell 1, Normal cell, Red Blood Cells	
2018	ClassicaLoid	Male	
2018	Hakyu Hoshin Engi	Firewood seller	
2018	Hi Score Girl	Boy, Student	
2018	Layton Mystery Tanteisha: Katori no Nazotoki File	Actor	Ep.11
2018	That Time I Got Reincarnated as a Slime	Goblin	Ep.2
2018	The Master of Ragnarok & Blesser of Einherjar	Customer, Slave Trader, Soldier, Warrior	
2018	Yu-Gi-Oh! VRAINS	Knight of Hanoi	
2019	Boogiepop and Others	Keiji Takeda	
2019	Cautious Hero: The Hero Is Overpowered but Overly Cautious	Colt	Ep.11
2019	Do You Love Your Mom and Her Two-Hit Multi-Target Attacks?	Announcer, Man	
2019	Fairy Gone	Security Force Member	Ep.3
2019	Fire Force	Firefighter, White-Clad	Ep.1, 19
2019	Forest of Piano	Satoshi Mukai	
2019	Fruits Basket	Delivery man	Ep.4
2019	Given	Friend, Young man	
2019	High School Prodigies Have It Easy Even In Another World	Villager	Ep.4
2019	King of Prism: Shiny Seven Stars	Ushio Takahashi	
2019	Senryu Girl	Amusement park attendee, Employee, Man	
2019	Star-Myu: High School Star Musical 3	Student	
2019	Vinland Saga	Askeladd (young)	
2019	Wasteful Days of High School Girls	Ikemen	Ep.1
2019	Wise Man's Grandchild	Tony Freyd	
2020	A Certain Scientific Railgun T	Rival School Boy	Ep.3
2020	Ahiru no Sora	Shinshiro member, Spectator	
2020	Asteroid in Love	Radio club member	Ep.11
2020	By the Grace of the Gods	Jill	
2020	Darwin's Game	Kyōda	
2020	Great Pretender	Makoto Edamura	
2020	Higurashi: When They Cry – Gou	Bad Man	
2020	Ikebukuro West Gate Park	Masaru Taniguchi	
2020	Moriarty the Patriot	Louis James Moriarty	
2020	Sing "Yesterday" for Me	Yū Hayakawa	
2020	The Irregular at Magic High School - Visitor Arc	Parasite	Ep.8
2020	Wandering Witch: The Journey of Elaina	Gatekeeper	Ep.6
2020	Yu-Gi-Oh! Sevens	Rinnosuke Nanahoshi	
2021	2.43: Seiin High School Boys Volleyball Team	Komukai	
2021	Higurashi: When They Cry – Sotsu	Da Vinci's Guest	Ep.4
2021	How a Realist Hero Rebuilt the Kingdom	Sur	Ep.10
2021	King's Raid: Successors of the Will	Youth	
2021	Pokémon Master Journeys: The Series	Koduck trainer	Ep.57
2021	Seirei Gensouki: Spirit Chronicles	Saga Hayate	Ep.7-8
2021	SK8 the Infinity	Langa Hasegawa	
2021	Skate-Leading Stars	Terahigashi	
2021	Sonny Boy	Asakaze	
2021	That Time I Got Reincarnated as a Slime Season 2	Shōgo Taguchi	
2021	Waccha PriMagi!	Inoru Omega	Ep.13
2021	Yo-kai Watch Jam - Yo-kai Academy Y: Close Encounters of the N Kind	Ryusuke Kyubi	
2022	Arknights: Prelude to Dawn	Guard	
2022	Eternal Boys	Soki Azuma	
2022	Fanfare of Adolescence	Kota Maki	
2022	I'm the Villainess, So I'm Taming the Final Boss	Kyle Elford	
2022	Lupin the 3rd Part 6	Allen	Ep.22
2022	My Isekai Life	Yuji	
2022	Play It Cool, Guys	Hayate Ichikura	
2022	Requiem of the Rose King	John Grey	Ep.2
2022	Shoot! Goal to the Future	Hideto Tsuji	
2022	Tomodachi Game	Yūichi Katagiri	
2022	VazzRock the Animation	Shouto Takenaka	
2023	Campfire Cooking in Another World with My Absurd Skill	Kaito	
2023	Chronicles of an Aristocrat Reborn in Another World	Claude	
2023	Frieren: Beyond Journey's End	Stark	
2023	Helck	Bowen	
2023	Hell's Paradise: Jigokuraku	Gabimaru	
2023	Horimiya: The Missing Pieces	Shimoda	Ep.7
2023	KamiErabi God.app	Kyō	
2023	Mashle: Magic and Muscles	Mash Burnedead	
2023	Overtake!	Ryo Kagayama	
2023	Ragna Crimson	Ragna	
2023	Reborn to Master the Blade: From Hero-King to Extraordinary Squire	Rahl Rambach	
2023	The Fire Hunter	Shōzō	
2023	The Ice Guy and His Cool Female Colleague	Himuro-kun	
2023	The Saint's Magic Power Is Omnipotent 2nd Season	Tenyū	
2023	Too Cute Crisis	Kaoru Mamizuka	
2024	A Condition Called Love	Saki Hananoi	
2024	Bleach: Thousand-Year Blood War	Bazz-B (young)	
2024	Blue Box	Kyo Kasahara	
2024	Cherry Magic! Thirty Years of Virginity Can Make You a Wizard?!	Kiyoshi Adachi	
2024	Mashle: Magic and Muscles The Divine Visionary Candidate Exam Arc	Mash Burnedead	
2024	Metallic Rouge	Noid 262	
2024	Mission: Yozakura Family	Aonuma	
2024	The Blue Wolves of Mibu	Hajime Saitō	
2024	The Stories of Girls Who Couldn't Be Magicians	Kyō Kurumaru	
2024	Makeine: Too Many Losing Heroines!	Mitsuki Ayano	
2024	Tower of God Season 2	Po Bidau Gustang	
2024	Wind Breaker	Kōta Sako	
2025	Mechanical Marie	Noah	
2025	Ninja vs. Gokudo	Shinoha Tanaka	
2025	Princession Orchestra	Callisto	
2025	Sakamoto Days	Apart	
2025	The Shiunji Family Children	Shion Shiunji	
2025	The Summer Hikaru Died	Yoshiki Tsujinaka	
2026	Akane-banashi	Koguma Arakawa	
2026	Dark Moon: The Blood Altar	Noa	
2026	Frieren: Beyond Journey's End Season 2	Stark	
2026	Go for It, Nakamura!	Okuto Nakamura	
2026	Hell's Paradise: Jigokuraku Season 2	Gabimaru	
2026	High School! Kimengumi	Jin Daima	
2026	Pardon the Intrusion, I'm Home!	Kyō Honda	
2026	The Ramparts of Ice	Tsubasa Igarashi	
2026	The Salty Koharu Has a Soft Spot for Me	Ren Misono	
2026	Though I Am an Inept Villainess	Unran	
TBA	Heir to a Monstermancer	Hakura	

=== Original video animation (OVA) ===
List of voice performances in Original video animation (OVA)
Year	Title	Role	Notes
2020	ACCA: 13-Territory Inspection Dept. - Regards	Parrot	
2022	Legend of the Galactic Heroes: Die Neue These - Clash	Peter Reamer	
2022	Moriarty the Patriot	Louis James Moriarty	

=== Original net animation (ONA) ===
List of voice performances in Original net animation (ONA)
Year	Title	Role	Notes
2018	Today's Menu for the Emiya Family	Clerk	Ep.1
2019	Gundam Build Divers Re:Rise	Hiroto Kuga	
2020	Gundam Build Divers: Battlogue	Hiroto Kuga	
2022	Vampire in the Garden	Allegro	
2022	Spriggan	Yu Ominae	
2023	Cute Executive Officer R	Subordinate	
2023	Fate/Grand Over: Fujimaru Ritsuka Doesn't Get It	Bartholomew Roberts	
2023	Gundam Build Metaverse	Hiroto Kuga	
2024	Great Pretender: Razbliuto	Makoto Edamura	
2025	Moonrise	Jacob Shadow	
2025	Disney Twisted-Wonderland: The Animation	Deuce Spade	

=== Theatrical animation ===
List of voice performances in theatrical anime
Year	Title	Role	Notes
2019	Fate/stay night: Heaven's Feel II. lost butterfly	On-site reporter	
2019	Yo-kai Watch Jam the Movie: Yo-Kai Academy Y - Can a Cat be a Hero?	Ryūsuke Kyūbi / Nine Tail	
2021	Summer Ghost	Tomoya Sugisaki	
2023	Eternal Boys NEXT STAGE	Soki Azuma	
2024	Blue Lock: Episode Nagi	Ranze Kurona	

=== Video games ===
2018

- Sword Art Online: Fatal Bullet as Voice 9 (Male)

2019

- Crash Fever as Beethoven
- DANKIRA!!! - Boys, be DANCING! as Atago Rentaro
- Dragalia Lost as Shion
- Fate/Grand Order as Bartholomew Roberts
- MapleStory 2 as Thief
- SD Gundam G Generation Cross Rays as Soldier
- Yo-kai Watch: Wibble Wobble as Ryūsuke Kyūbi / Nine Tail

2020

- Disney: Twisted-Wonderland as Deuce Spade
- Fantasy Life Online as Nine Tail
- MapleStory as Carlisle
- World Flipper as Yakumo
- Yo-kai Watch Jam: Yo-kai Academy Y – Waiwai Gakuen Seikatsu as Ryūsuke Kyūbi / Nine Tail
- Yu-Gi-Oh! Duel Links as Aigami

2021

- A3! as Akashi Serizawa
- Border Reign as Ganshu, Goya
- Bungo and Alchemist as Arthur Rimbaud
- Cookie Run: Kingdom as Sparkling Cookie
- Dragon Quest X Online as Guruyan Rush, Quad
- Fire Emblem Heroes as Ronan
- For Whom the Alchemist Exists as Nimuru
- Granblue Fantasy as New King of Levin
- Illusion Connect as Jason
- Show by Rock!! Fes A Live as 13

2022

- River City Girls 2 as Riki
- Honkai Impact 3rd as Kosma

2023

- Rear Sekai as Brad
- Final Fantasy VII: Ever Crisis as Matt Windsor

2024

- Reynatis as Marin Kirizumi
- Wuthering Waves as Xiangli Yao
- Ensemble Stars!! as Ibuki Taki
- 18TRIP as Kafka Oguro

2025

- Genshin Impact as Durin

=== Dubbing ===
==== Live-action ====
- After as Hardin Scott (Hero Fiennes Tiffin)
- Beetlejuice Beetlejuice as Jeremy (Arthur Conti)
- Jurassic World Rebirth as Xavier Dobbs (David Iacono)
- Seo Bok as Seo Bok (Park Bo-gum)
- Tales of the City as Jake Rodriguez (Garcia)
- Love Will Tear Us Apart us Da Qiao (Sun Ning)
- Voltes V: Legacy: Super Electromagnetic Edition as Steve Armstrong (Miguel Tanfelix)

==== Animation ====
- The Boss Baby: Back in Business as Wagby
- Heaven Official's Blessing as Fu Yao
- Mune: Guardian of the Moon as Leeyoon
- Tara Duncan as Robin M'angil

=== Media mix ===
List of voice performances in media mix projects
Year	Title	Role	Notes
2019	Paradox Live	Kenta Mikoshiba	
2021	Live us	Akito Shinji	
2021	VS AMBIVALENZ	Jintaro, Cion	
2023	PolaPoriPosuPo	Chiaki Shinjou	

== Accolades ==
Year	Award	Category	Work/Recipient	Result	Source
2021	15th Seiyu Awards	Best New Actor Award	Makoto Edamura (Great Pretender)	Won	
2026	10th Crunchyroll Anime Awards	Best Voice Artist Performance (Japanese)	Yoshiki Tsujinaka (The Summer Hikaru Died)	Nominated	
