= The Ice Guy and His Cool Female Colleague =

Japanese manga series

- Cover of The Ice Guy and His Cool Female Colleague volume 1 by Square Enix

氷属性男子とクールな同僚女子 (Kōri Zokusei Danshi to Kūru na Dōryō Joshi)
- Genre: Fantasy, romantic comedy
- Manga
- Written by: Miyuki Tonogaya
- Published by: Square Enix
- English publisher: NA: Comikey (digital) Square Enix Manga & Books
- Magazine: Gangan Pixiv
- Original run: July 12, 2019 – present
- Volumes: 12
- Anime television series
- Directed by: Mankyū
- Written by: Tomoko Konparu
- Music by: Ruka Kawada
- Studio: Zero-G; Liber
- Licensed by: Crunchyroll (streaming); SEA: Medialink
- Original network: Tokyo MX, ABC, Mētele, BS Asahi
- Original run: January 4, 2023 – March 22, 2023
- Episodes: 12
- icon

The Ice Guy and His Cool Female Colleague (Japanese: 氷属性男子とクールな同僚女子, Hepburn: Kōri Zokusei Danshi to Kūru na Dōryō Joshi), also known as The Ice Guy and the Cool Girl, is a Japanese manga series written and illustrated by Miyuki Tonogaya. It began serialization on Square Enix's Gangan Pixiv manga website in July 2019. As of September 2026, the series' individual chapters have been collected into twelve volumes. An anime television series adaptation produced by Zero-G and Liber aired from January to March 2023.

== Plot ==
The series is a romantic comedy set in a modern office job. Himuro is the descendant of a snow spirit, causing miniature blizzards whenever he focuses on his work or gets excited. He has a crush on his coworker Fuyutsuki, an ordinary woman who is oblivious to his romantic feelings.

== Characters ==
Mio Fuyutsuki (冬月 美桜, Fuyutsuki Mio)
Voiced by: Yui Ishikawa (Japanese); Kristen McGuire (English)
Yukiya Himuro (氷室 雪矢, Himuro Yukiya)
Voiced by: Chiaki Kobayashi (Japanese); Lee George (English)
Komori-san (狐森さん)
Voiced by: Yumi Uchiyama (Japanese); Caitlin Glass (English)
Saejima-kun (冴島くん)
Voiced by: Koki Uchiyama (Japanese); Austin Tindle (English)
Otonashi-san (音無さん)
Voiced by: Ayane Sakura (Japanese); Emily Fajardo (English)
Katori-kun (火鳥くん)
Voiced by: Shugo Nakamura (Japanese); Dallas Reid (English)
Yukimi Himuro (氷室 ゆきみ, Himuro Yukimi)
Voiced by: Hiyori Nitta (Japanese); Helena Walstrom (English)

== Media ==
=== Manga ===
Written and illustrated by Miyuki Tonogaya, the series initially began its release on Tonogaya's Twitter account on August 3, 2018. It began serialization on Square Enix's Gangan Pixiv manga website on July 12, 2019. As of September 2026, the series' individual chapters have been collected into twelve tankōbon volumes.

In November 2021, Comikey announced that they licensed the series. In March 2023, Square Enix Manga & Books announced that they licensed the series for English publication under the title The Ice Guy and the Cool Girl.

==== Volumes ====
| No. | Original release date | Original ISBN | English release date | English ISBN |
|---|---|---|---|---|
| 1 | July 22, 2019 | 978-4-7575-6166-3 | October 10, 2023 | 978-1-64609-237-6 |
Chapters 1–5; Bonus Story: The Company Trip to Okinawa; Chapters 6–13; Bonus Story: Her Birthday; Chapters 14–15; Bonus Story: How They Met
| 2 | March 21, 2020 | 978-4-7575-6542-5 | December 12, 2023 | 978-1-64609-238-3 |
Chapters 16–20; Bonus Story: The Descendant of a Fox Spirit; Chapters 21–23; Bonus Story: At the Movie Theater; Chapters 24–25; Bonus Story: The Amusement Park
| 3 | October 22, 2020 | 978-4-7575-6867-9 | February 6, 2024 | 978-1-64609-239-0 |
Chapters 26–30; Bonus Story: The Stormy Sleepover; Chapter 31; Bonus Story: Online Gaming
| 4 | April 22, 2021 | 978-4-7575-7206-5 | April 9, 2024 | 978-1-64609-240-6 |
Chapters 32–35; Bonus Story: New Year's Shrine Visit; Chapters 36–37; Bonus Story: Encounters with a Stray Cat
| 5 | November 22, 2021 | 978-4-7575-7581-3 | June 11, 2024 | 978-1-64609-241-3 |
Chapters 38–40; Bonus Story: Karaoke with Everyone
| 6 | June 22, 2022 | 978-4-7575-7979-8 | August 13, 2024 | 978-1-64609-242-0 |
Chapters 41–44; Bonus Story: Playing in the Snow Together
| 7 | December 21, 2022 | 978-4-7575-8317-7 | October 8, 2024 | 978-1-64609-254-3 |
Chapters 45–48; Bonus Story: Barbecue with Everyone
| 8 | June 22, 2023 | 978-4-7575-8619-2 | December 3, 2024 | 978-1-64609-267-3 |
Chapters 49–52; Bonus Story: Fangirl Pilgrimage; Chapter 53
| 9 | January 22, 2024 | 978-4-7575-9018-2 | February 18, 2025 | 978-1-64609-330-4 |
Chapter 54–58; Bonus Story: The Boys Attempt to Make Ramen
| 10 | August 21, 2024 | 978-4-7575-9372-5 | August 12, 2025 | 978-1-64609-430-1 |
Chapters 59–63; Bonus Story: First Couple Pic
| 11 | June 20, 2025 | 978-4-7575-9909-3 | June 9, 2026 | 978-1-64609-489-9 |
| 12 | September 18, 2026 | 978-4-3010-0773-9 | — | — |

=== Anime ===
An anime television series adaptation, produced by Zero-G and Liber, was announced on June 21, 2022. It is directed by Mankyū, with scripts written by Tomoko Konparu, character designs handled by Miyako Kanō, and music composed by Ruka Kawada. The series aired from January 4 to March 22, 2023, on Tokyo MX and other networks. The opening theme song is "Frozen Midnight" by Takao Sakuma, while the ending theme song is "Linaria" (リナリア) by Nowlu. At Anime NYC 2022, Crunchyroll announced that they streamed the series. Medialink licensed the series in Southeast Asia and streamed on Ani-One Asia YouTube channel.

==== Episodes ====
| No. | Title | Directed by | Written by | Storyboard by | Original release date (Note: Episodes are released on select platforms a day before their air dates on television.) |
|---|---|---|---|---|---|
| 1 | "A Cherry Blossom Meeting & A Coming Blizzard"; Transliteration: "Sakura no Deai to Fubuki no Yokan" (Japanese: 桜の出会いと吹雪の予感) | Atsuko Tonomizu | Tomoko Konparu | Mankyū | January 4, 2023 |
In an alternate Japan there exist people whose ancestors were spirits. A woman named Fuyutsuki gets her first job in an office. During her commute, she encounters Himuro, a young man whose feet are frozen in ice. Himuro explains that he is descended from the Snow Woman spirit and possesses ice magic, but his fear of starting a new job froze his feet. Fuyutsuki drinks tea with him until the ice melts, and Himuro develops a crush on her. By coincidence, they have both been hired by the same company along with Saejima, a human, and Komori, a descendant of the Fox spirit. Fuyutsuki learns that Himuro loves flowers and cats but cannot go near them as his powers freeze them. The next day Fuyutsuki gives Himuro a straw packaging, which can protect plants from frost, and a collection of her cat's whiskers. Enamored, Himuro accidentally fills the office with a snow storm, though Fuyutsuki seems oblivious. The company announces a trip to Okinawa to welcome new employees, but Himuro is reluctant to go.
| 2 | "The Okinawan Sea & Melting Feelings"; Transliteration: "Okinawa no Umi to Torokeru Kimochi" (Japanese: 沖縄の海ととろける気持ち) | Masaki Utsunomiya | Tomoko Konparu | Miyana Okita | January 11, 2023 |
Himuro worries that his excitement will cause a snow storm, ruining the trip for everyone. Fuyutsuki makes a surf drum so Himuro can practise being at the beach without freezing. Himuro trains until he can control his powers but at the beach he almost causes storms anyway due to everything he finds cute about Fuyutsuki. Eventually, while sightseeing with her, he accidentally makes it snow. Fuyutsuki learns that Himuro hates hot weather as it can melt him. The next morning, there is a heatwave and Himuro goes missing. Worried, Fuyutsuki searches and finds him hiding in the shade, discovering that when he melts he physically shrinks and now resembles a child version of himself. If Himuro melts further, he will become a baby, so Fuyutsuki buys ice-cream to make him cold again. Fuyutsuki admits that she finds his child form adorable and strokes his hair, but he returns to adult size so fast it flusters them both, though Fuyutsuki is confused by her own feelings. Later, it is revealed that Fuyutsuki secretly took a photo of child-Himuro.
| 3 | "A First Meal & A Secret Photo"; Transliteration: "Hajimete Gohan to Naisho no Shashin" (Japanese: 初めてごはんとナイショの写真) | Tomio Yamauchi | Mankyū | Hiroshi Chida | January 18, 2023 |
Himuro and Fuyutsuki learn that they might be transferred to different departments but are relieved when they are sent to the same office, along with Saejima and Komori, causing Himuro to freeze the office repeatedly. Deciding to show gratitude for helping him in Okinawa, Himuro decides to ask Fuyutsuki to dinner. At a restaurant, Fuyutsuki suspects that they are on a real date but is too nervous to ask. Himuro is likewise nervous and since neither can think what to talk about the date comes off awkward and abruptly ends when Himuro claims that he enjoyed the date and promptly faints from the heat of his own blushing. The next day, Himuro overhears Fuyutsuki say that she likes Himuro but knows nothing about him. He asks to exchange phone numbers with her, surprising her. She later begins sending him pictures of her cat, Nyamero. Fuyutsuki now uses the photo of child-Himuro as her phone background, but hides this from him. The next day in the office, Himuro talks to Katori, a man also descended from a spirit.
| 4 | "A Day Off Date & A Shared Game"; Transliteration: "Kyūjitsu Dēto to Futari no Gēmu" (Japanese: 休日デートとふたりのゲーム) | Kentarō Mizuno | Masahiro Yokotani | Toshizō Kida | January 25, 2023 |
Katori, a descendant of the Phoenix, is Himuro's childhood friend and has just been hired as a salesman. Fuyutsuki later invites Himuro to the movies to see a cat-themed children's film. Himuro agrees, wondering if this is another date. They are both so excited that they struggle to sleep that night. At the movie theater, unbeknownst to them, Saejima and Katori are present but watching a different film. Fuyutsuki cries over the film and is curious about what happens when Himuro cries, but he insists that that is secret. The next day, both Himuro and Fuyutsuki have to work late and are alone in the office, which Himuro freezes. Meanwhile, Saejima and Komori end up having dinner with Katori and his manager Otonashi. Saejima reveals that she saw Himuro and Fuyutsuki at the cinema, causing speculation that they are secretly dating. Fearing that Fuyutsuki is bored, Himuro suggests that they play games to pass the time. Fuyutsuki decides to stay longer, even after her work is finished. They end up getting dinner together, causing another snowstorm in the office. Meanwhile, their friends wonder exactly what happened while they were working late.
| 5 | "The Fox Girl & The Phoenix Boy"; Transliteration: "Yōko Joshi to Fushichō Danshi" (Japanese: 妖狐女子と不死鳥男子) | Atsuko Tonomizu | Masahiro Takata | Yasuyuki Ōishi | February 1, 2023 |
Himuro enters a competition to win two collectible kitten plates. Komori finds it inconvenient that her ears and tail sometimes pop out. Saejima suggests that she leave them visible, as he thinks that they are cute. Fuyutsuki enters the same contest as Himuro. Komori begins collecting toys from sweet boxes, but someone begins leaving extra toys for her. She later discovers that it was Saejima who then confesses to her, causing her to develop a crush on him. Himuro realizes that he will not collect enough points to win the plates, so Fuyutsuki gives him her points too and they take one plate each. Katori fears that he has upset Otonashi. Fuyutsuki is certain that it is because he keeps making childish love confessions. Katori is relieved when Otonashi is not angry but reveals to Himuro that he really loves Otonashi. Fuyutsuki suggests that he find a more serious way to confess. Katori practices a serious confession to Fuyutsuki, so Himuro jealously freezes him in ice. Fuyutsuki wonders what it might have been like to be childhood friends with Himuro, making him freeze the office again. Their boss, a descendant of The Buddha, gives Himuro two tickets to a cat-themed amusement park.
| 6 | "Lost in The Amusement Park"; Transliteration: "Rosuto In Yuenchi" (Japanese: ロスト・イン・遊園地) | Takashi Asami | Tomoko Konparu | Fumikazu Satō | February 8, 2023 |
Fuyutsuki agrees to attend the park with Himuro, causing another snow storm. Himuro tries to plan the visit in advance and is helped by Komori, a frequent visitor to the park. Fuytsuki, oblivious to it being a date, also invites Komori, who panics and invites Saijima. Himuro enters an icy depression as the date is now a double date. At the park Fuyutsuki and Himuro help a lost child, so Komori and Saejima go on ahead, hoping that Fuyutsuki and Himuro will have a real date once alone. However, Komori and Saejima quickly end up alone on their own awkward date. Fuyutsuki and Himuro spend all day together, including dinner and several snow storms, and end up at a souvenir shop. Fuyutsuki suggests buying matching coffee mugs and Himuro is so emotional from the whole day that he almost confesses his love, only for Komori and Saejima to reappear at the crucial moment. After watching a parade and fireworks, everyone returns home by train. En route, Himuro falls asleep with Fuyutsuki watching him. They both now have mugs and plates from matching sets.
| 7 | "Excitement! The Halloween Costume Contest"; Transliteration: "Dokitto! Harōwin Kosupure Taikai" (Japanese: ドキッと！ハロウィンコスプレ大会) | Chika Nenbe | Masahiro Yokotani | Yōichi Ueda | February 15, 2023 |
Fuyutsuki is interested in a Halloween-themed iced coffee. Himuro buys four so Fuyutsuki can try it with Saejima and Komori. At the office, however, he finds that Fuyutsuki, having had the same idea, also bought four. They find this funny and share the extra cups of coffee with Katori's group. The company president, a descendant of the Nurarihyon spirit, decides to host a Halloween party with a 100,000 yen prize for best group costume. It is decided that everyone will dress as pumpkins, though Fuyutsuki is disappointed that the pumpkin costumes are sold out. While looking for other costumes, Fuyutsuki finds high class vampire costumes and Himuro nearly freezes the shop. The night of the party, Fuyutsuki is kept late by her clients. Katori forgets the costumes he made for himself and Otonashi so they improvise with paper to become Egyptian mummies. Fuyutsuki pranks Himuro with fake blood so he freezes himself solid. Seeing Himuro dressed up, Fuyutsuki is flustered by how good he looks, and the two remain awkward the entire party. Katori and Otonashi win the prize but share it with Fuyutsuki and the group on dinner at an expensive restaurant. Himuro ends up walking Fuyutsuki home still in their costumes.
| 8 | "The Little Sister Appears! Christmas on the Slopes"; Transliteration: "Imōto Tōjō! Sukī-jō no Kurisumasu" (Japanese: 妹登場！スキー場のクリスマス) | Shinya Sasaki | Masahiro Takata | Toshinari Yamashita | February 22, 2023 |
With Christmas approaching, Himuro buys snowflake earrings for Fuyutsuki. Komori wins a Christmas ski trip and invites Saejima, Himuro and Fuyutsuki. Himuro is thrilled to be asked to teach Fuyutsuki to ski, until he realises that he does not actually know how to teach, since for him, skiing is an innate skill he knew without having to learn. Komori teaches Fuyutsuki instead, depressing Himuro. Reaching the ski lodge, Himuro reveals that he has a younger sister, Yukimi, a model and minor internet celebrity who, by coincidence, works part-time at the lodge. Himuro and Yukimi argue constantly, but the latter is happy that the former is fitting in at work and has made friends. Charmed by Fuyutsuki, Yukimi declares that she is in love, causing an instant jealous blizzard from Himuro. After dinner, Himuro gives Fuyutsuki her gift, a kitten blanket, revealing that he changed his mind about the earrings, afraid that they were too personal a gift for co-workers. Returning home, Fuyutsuki is happy that she saw how Himuro acts with his family. Himuro hopes to take Fuyutsuki skiing again next year and thanks a confused Yukimi for her help.
| 9 | "Lost Again And A First Shrine Visit"; Transliteration: "Rosuto Agein In Hatsumōde" (Japanese: ロスト・アゲイン・イン・初詣) | Tsurumi Mukōyama; Kentarō Mizuno | Masahiro Yokotani | Atsuko Tonomizu | March 1, 2023 |
With Christmas over, the President announces a long holiday. Fuyutsuki notices that Himuro has cold hands. She holds his hand to warm them up, and Himuro causes a blizzard that covers the whole street. Everyone joins a video call to celebrate the New Year together, though Fuyutsuki is embarrassed when everyone sees that she wears her high school gym clothes as pyjamas. After arranging to visit a shrine on New Years Day, everyone leaves the call until only Himuro and Fuyutsuki are left and they watch the midnight countdown together. Himuro has a dream that tells him that the next year will be full of bad luck. Komori does not attend the shrine due to visiting her parents. Fuyutsuki arrives in a kimono, followed quickly by Himuro's blizzard. Everyone becomes separated; Saejima alone, Katori and Otonashi to the food stalls and Fuyutsuki and Himuro to the shrine where they accidentally hold hands again trying not to be separated. Komori appears as a Shrine-Maiden, revealing thay her parents own the shrine. Komori is disappointed that she cannot be with everyone but cheers up when Saejima buys her a protective charm. While praying, Himuro wishes to still be with Fuyutsuki next year.
| 10 | "Sleepover in the Storm!"; Transliteration: "Arashi no Otomarikai!" (Japanese: 嵐のお泊り会！！) | Masahiro Takata | Masahiro Takata | Toshizō Kida | March 8, 2023 |
As Fuyutsuki's birthday is approaching, Himuro is determined to give her the snowflake earrings he did not give her for Christmas. Severe rain cancels the trains so the women share a hotel room while the men sleep at Katori's apartment nearby. Komori and Otonashi tease each other over Saejima and Katori, causing Fuyutsuki to confess that she has never been in love. This amuses Otonashi and Komori, who think that it is obvious that she is in love with Himuro. Meamwhile, Katori and Saejima tell Himuro that it is obvious that he is in love with Fuyutsuki. The next day, Himuro overhears that Fuyutsuki has birthday plans with her parents and decides to give her the earrings at work. However, he is constantly thwarted by interruptions. During their walk home, he accidentally freezes the river and trees. Fuyutsuki finds the sight beautiful, and he finally gives her the earrings. She loves them so much that she wears them to dinner with her parents and promises to get something equally special for Himuro's birthday. Himuro later practices his love confession alone.
| 11 | "Catch Me & Touch Me"; Transliteration: "Kyatchi Mī ando Tatchi Mī" (Japanese: キャッチミー&タッチミー) | Atsuko Tonomizu | Tomoko Konparu | Atsuko Tonomizu | March 15, 2023 |
Komori overhears Himuro is moving someone into his apartment but is confused that it is not Fuyutsuki. Himuro later explains that he plans to rescue a stray cat near his apartment. Fuyutsuki volunteers to help and shows him a trick to befriending cats. However, Fuyutsuki spots a poster revealing that the cat is a missing pet, so they return him to his owner. Himuro becomes depressed, so Fuyutsuki invites him to her apartment at the weekend to spend time with her cat Nyamero. This instantly cheers him up. Just stepping inside Fuyutsuki's apartment causes a blizzard of ultra fine snowflakes called Diamond Dust, a sign that Himuro is overjoyed. The two accidentally touch hands, but the moment is ruined when Yukimi arrives, revealing that she and Fuyutsuki are now friends and that she visits her apartment regularly. Realising that she is interrupting, Yukimi decides to leave but cannot find an excuse that does not seem rude and ends up staying for coffee. Himuro is disappointed but recovers when Fuyutsuki asks to visit their home next time. At work, Komori and Saejima demand to know how the visit went. Later, Himuro and Fuyutsuki meet at the train station, both with suitcases.
| 12 | "Their Night Together & The Morning Spring Came"; Transliteration: "Futarikiri no Yoru to Haru ga Kita Asa" (Japanese: ふたりきりの夜と春が来た朝) | Kentarō Mizuno | Tomoko Konparu | Toshizō Kida | March 22, 2023 |
Himuro and Fuyutsuki have been sent on a business trip together, including a restaurant dinner and hotel rooms, to Himuro's joy. After their grueling work schedule is over, Himuro sneezes and melts into his child form again. Fuyutsuki confirms that he has a bad fever from overworking, cancels dinner, and insists on sharing a room so she can look after him. They eventually have an awkward moment when Himuro collapses on top of her on the bed. However, the moment passes when their boss telephones them. Fuyutsuki completes paperwork while Himuro sleeps and returns to his adult size. Awakening and seeing Fuyutsuki asleep on the sofa, Himuro feels guilty and works until morning, making himself sleep deprived. Returning home, Himuro feels guilty for ruining the trip. They pass by the street where they first met and realize that they have known each other a whole year. Reminiscing, they admit that they are happier from having met each other. After returning to the office they attend a cherry blossom viewing party with their friends to welcome them home.

== Reception ==
In the 2019 Next Manga Award, the series ranked twelfth in the web manga category.
