= Rieko Takahashi =

Japanese actress and voice actress (born 1967)

- 高橋 理恵子
- Born: November 28, 1967 (age 58); Saitama Prefecture, Japan
- Occupations: Actress, voice actress
- Years active: 1989–present
- Agent: Enkikaku

Rieko Takahashi (高橋 理恵子, Takahashi Rieko; born November 28, 1967) is a Japanese actress and voice actress from Saitama Prefecture. She is represented by the Enkikaku agency.

== Filmography ==
=== Anime ===
Year	Title	Role	Notes	Ref(s)
1996	Detective Conan	Yotsui Reika	Debut; ep 39	
1999	Mobile Suit Gundam: The 08th MS Team	Twin A		
1999	Kindaichi Case Files	Michiyo		
1999–2000	Turn A Gundam	Dianna Soriel; Kihel Heim		
2001	Hanaukyo Maid Team	Ryuuka Jihiyo		
2001	Inuyasha	Miroku (young)		
2002	Tokyo Mew Mew	Ryo's Mother	Ep 36	
2002	Turn A Gundam: Earth Light	Dianna Soreil; Kihel Heim		
2002	Turn A Gundam: Moonlight Butterfly	Dianna Soreil; Kihel Heim		
2003–2004	One Piece	Conis		
2004–2005	Samurai 7	Yukino		
2006	Simoun	Neviril		
2006	xxxHolic	Nurie	Ep 17	
2007	Sgt. Frog	Kaguya	Ep 76	
2008	True Tears	Shinichirō's mother		
2008	Golgo 13	Celia Irving	Ep 35	
2011	Freezing	Sister Margarett		
2013	Mushibugyō	Lady Sen	Ep 24	
2013	Gifū Dōdō!! Kanetsugu to Keiji	Sentōin	Eps 7, 11, 14	
2025	Mechanical Marie	Old Lady Charlotte		

=== Video games ===
Year	Title	Role	Ref(s)
2001	Ico	Yorda	
2001	Super Robot Wars Alpha Gaiden	Dianna Soreil; Kihel Heim	
2008	Super Robot Wars Z	Dianna Soreil	

=== Dubbing ===
==== Live-action ====
Original year	Title	Role	Original actor	Notes	Ref(s)
1997–2003	Buffy the Vampire Slayer	Drusilla	Juliet Landau		
1998	The Big Lebowski	Bunny Lebowski	Tara Reid	VHS/DVD edition	
1998	Pecker	Shelley	Christina Ricci		
1999	Sabrina the Teenage Witch	Britney Spears			
1999	Girl, Interrupted	Susanna Kaysen	Winona Ryder		
2000	The Beach	Françoise	Virginie Ledoyen		
2001	Sweet November	Sara Deever	Charlize Theron		
2003	Gothika	Chloe Sava	Penélope Cruz		
2005	Batman Begins	Rachel Dawes	Katie Holmes	2007 NTV edition	
2006	Black Book	Rachel Stein	Carice van Houten		
2006	The Black Dahlia	Katherine "Kay" Lake	Scarlett Johansson		
2006–2017	Bones	Dr. Camille Saroyan	Tamara Taylor		
2007	August Rush	Lyla Novacek	Keri Russell		
2007	The Jane Austen Book Club	Prudie	Emily Blunt		
2008	Deception	S	Michelle Williams		
2008	Incendiary	Young Mother	Michelle Williams		
2008	Definitely, Maybe	April Hoffman	Isla Fisher		
2008	Mesrine	Sofia	Elena Anaya		
2010	Shutter Island	Rachel Solando	Emily Mortimer		
2010	Paranormal Activity 2	Kristi	Sprague Grayden		
2010–2014	Boardwalk Empire	Margaret Thompson	Kelly Macdonald		
2011	Hugo	Lisette	Emily Mortimer		
2011	Paranormal Activity 3	Kristi	Sprague Grayden		
2012	Promised Land	Alice	Rosemarie DeWitt		
2013	Saving Mr. Banks	Margaret Goff	Ruth Wilson		
2013	Fading Gigolo	Avigal	Vanessa Paradis		
2014	Godzilla	Vivienne Graham	Sally Hawkins		
2017	Murder on the Orient Express	Pilar Estravados	Penélope Cruz		
2018	Puzzle	Agnes	Kelly Macdonald		
2018	Holmes & Watson	Rose Hudson	Kelly Macdonald		
2019	Godzilla: King of the Monsters	Vivienne Graham	Sally Hawkins		
2021	Landscapers	DC Emma Lancing	Kate O'Flynn		

==== Animation ====
Original year	Title	Role	Original actor	Ref(s)
1999	Toy Story 2	Barbie	Jodi Benson	
2008	Tinker Bell	Silvermist	Lucy Liu	
2009	Tinker Bell and the Lost Treasure	Silvermist	Lucy Liu	
2010	Tinker Bell and the Great Fairy Rescue	Silvermist	Lucy Liu	
2010	Toy Story 3	Barbie	Jodi Benson	
2012	Tinker Bell and the Secret of the Wings	Silvermist	Lucy Liu	
2014	Tinker Bell and the Pirate Fairy	Silvermist	Lucy Liu	
2015	Tinker Bell and the Legend of the NeverBeast	Silvermist	Lucy Liu	
