= The Record of a Fallen Vampire =

Japanese manga series

- Cover art of the seventh manga volume

ヴァンパイア十字界 (Vanpaia Jūji Kai)
- Genre: Adventure, dark fantasy, supernatural
- Manga
- Written by: Kyo Shirodaira
- Illustrated by: Yuri Kimura
- Published by: Square Enix
- English publisher: NA: Viz Media; Yen Press
- Magazine: Monthly Shōnen Gangan
- Original run: 2003 – 2007
- Volumes: 9
- Manga

Vampire Jūji-Kai: Inu ni wa Inu no Uta
- Written by: Kyo Shirodaira
- Illustrated by: Yuri Kimura
- Published by: Square Enix
- Magazine: Monthly Shōnen Gangan
- Original run: October 9, 2026 – present
- Anime television series
- Directed by: Mankyū
- Written by: Mankyū
- Music by: Evan Call
- Studio: Zero-G; Liber
- Original run: 2027 – scheduled

The Record of a Fallen Vampire (Japanese: ヴァンパイア十字界, Hepburn: Vanpaia Jūji-Kai; 'Vampire Cross-World') is a Japanese manga series written by Kyo Shirodaira and illustrated by Yuri Kimura. The story centers around Strauss (a vampire king) and follows his search for his queen who has been sealed away by humans unable to defeat her thousands of years ago. As this takes him to his set-aside Kingdom of the Night where he encounters dhampirs (half human, half vampire), and humans out to stop the reuniting of the King and Queen at any means possible.

The series was serialized in the magazine Monthly Shōnen Gangan from 2003 to 2007 and collected into nine tankōbon volumes by Square Enix. It was licensed in English by Viz Media, which released the volumes from May 2008 and May 2010. A sequel manga titled Vampire Jūji-Kai: Inu ni wa Inu no Uta began serialization in Monthly Shōnen Gangan in October 2026. An anime television series adaptation produced by Zero-G and Liber is set to premiere in 2027.

== Plot ==
The story follows Strauss, a former vampire king, as he searches for his queen Adelheid, who was sealed away one thousand years earlier. His quest draws the attention of dhampirs, humans, and the supernatural force known as the Black Swan.

== Characters ==
=== Vampires ===
Vampire king Strauss

Akabara "Red Rose" Strauss (ローズレッド ストラウス, Rōzureddo Sutorausu)

Voiced by: Yuma Uchida
Age: ~around 1250 (he became king around the very young age of 200 and adopted Bridget around 60 years old)
Strauss is the fearsome Vampire king Akabara (lit. Red Rose) who cast aside his kingdom a thousand years ago and went to search for Adelheid's seal and free her. While the other dhampires believe his motive is a deep love for his queen, Bridget believes that Strauss wants to find Adelheid so he can personally kill her as revenge for killing Stella. Strauss is somber but compassionate and does not kill without reason. He is also unusually cool and logical which allows him to master both the politics and the art of war with frightening precision. Strauss was seen by many as a god and thus great things were expected of him. Few ever stopped to think about his personal life as he devoted himself to his duties as general and later king. The many mysteries in the series revolve around him and the mysterious fall of his kingdom 1000 years ago. All attempts to pry information from him failed, and he resents the attempts to bring up the unhappy past.
Before becoming king, Strauss was a general of the Kingdom of the Night. During that time he adopted and raised Bridget, a dhampire girl. He was also in love with a human girl, Stella, whom he presented with a pendant made from lunar rock which he collected himself. Later it is revealed that Strauss never loved Adelheid, and that his true love interest was only Stella. As the general, Strauss had never been defeated on the field of battle; because of his exceptional leadership of the armies, the Kingdom of Night went without a loss for over 100 years. While he was a general, Strauss had the cunning and power to be able to control the entire continent. He chose not to, however, because he was content with the size of the Kingdom. He also knew that if he conquered more, the people will hate the Kingdom and rebel, causing the loss of many lives, which would be unacceptable. These same skills were taught to Bridget.
Strauss has impressive magical powers far outmatching those of the dhampires. Nevertheless, he chooses to limit his power and fight in close combat in order to avoid damage to the surroundings. He is usually seen fighting with a vibrating edge of magic, although he can also summon a sword and is an expert swordsman. At range, Strauss can cast vibrating magic arrows or destroy missiles with a single gesture of his hand. Although pure-blooded vampires perish when exposed to sunlight, Strauss has overcome this limitation long ago.
Despite being extremely powerful, Strauss is very kind-hearted, gentle, and has compassion for everyone except himself. It is later revealed that he abandoned his kingdom and turned himself into the ultimate enemy so both human and vampire races will collaborate and stop fighting each other, continuing to carry everyone's resentment for him for over 1000 years to protect everyone.

Queen Adelheid

Adelheid (アーデルハイト, Āderuhaito)

Age: 1190
Strauss' queen and Bridget's half-sister, Adelheid was sealed a thousand years ago when she went berserk and unleashed her power, the Moonlight of Corrosion (腐食の月, Fushoku no Gekkou). Though unskilled in the use of her magic, Adelheid is potentially more powerful than Strauss and her magic possesses terraforming capabilities; the corrosive nature of her powers resulted from unleashing it all at once and she, like Strauss, is not limited by exposure to sunlight. Legend says that she went berserk when she thought that the king had been killed, though Bridget believes that Adelheid was frightened and thought Strauss was going to kill her when he believed Adelheid had killed Stella and her unborn child. Nobody knew that she had witnessed Stella's death until Adelheid officially became Strauss' queen.
Adelheid had a shy and self-conscious personality and she always worried about how others thought of her. Unlike Bridget or Strauss, Adelheid does not possess an exceptional amount of brains or cunning. By comparison, Adelheid was the least skilled of the three but since she was the only pure-blooded daughter of the king, Adelheid was the only one who could become queen. When Adelheid first learned that Bridget was her sister, the future queen felt very guilty over the circumstances of her birth. Adelheid always tried to make it up to Bridget by calling the dhampire 'dear sister' and she and Bridget became close. After she is reawakened, she strives to atone for her weakness and past mistakes, particularly in regards to Stella's death, the deterioration of the Kingdom of the Night, and Strauss' downfall.

Gottfried

The vampire king that preceded Strauss as monarch. Gottfried is the biological father of Bridget and Adelheid. Like most rulers of the Kingdom of the Night, he became king at the age of 1000. Gottfried is an intelligent man that commanded the nation for several hundred years. As a pure-blood, it was difficult for Gottfried to produce offspring. Thus, when Bridget was born, she was allowed to be princess and heir in the off chance that Gottfried died. As soon as Adelheid was born, Gottfried banished his older daughter in order to prevent civil war between the two children.

=== Dhampires ===
Those who have both vampire and human blood are referred to as dhampires. All dhampires, except Laetitia, have united under Bridget against Strauss and his quest for the seal.

Bridget Irving Frostheart (ブリジット アーヴィング フロストハート, Burijitto Āvuingu Hurosutohāto)

Voiced by: Aino Shimada
Age: 1200
Bridget is the leader of the dhampire community, a highly capable and powerful dhamphir who has been fighting Strauss for over a thousand years. Bridget has set up thousands of 'nets' all over the world that allows her to track the activities of Strauss and she is highly organized and efficient. In battle, Bridget acts as the strategist, directing the other dhampires' attacks. Her knowledge of her adversary, Strauss, is second to none.
Bridget was adopted by Strauss when he was still a general, and raised like his own daughter; he was personally responsible for cultivating Bridget's abilities. According to Tessenji, Bridget's skill in the area of politics as well as her abilities with a sword, is the only reason that the dhampire survived after Strauss abdicated. Bridget is an expert in small group combat, and she has a keen military intelligence and excellent political sense. Despite the fact that she was only 150 and was a dhampire, she later served as one of his most trusted generals. Nevertheless, Strauss left her behind when he abandoned his kingdom.
Despite her history with Strauss, Bridget keeps her personal feelings and that of the dhampire community separate. There are several instances where Bridget allows herself to feel angry that she is not helping Strauss. While serving the Kingdom of the Night, the only thing that separated her from becoming Strauss' lover is the family-like status they had. Though initially jealous that Stella was taking her place in Strauss' life, Bridget later tolerated and eventually grew to respect Stella. As Stella was human and would live a considerably shorter life than her children, Bridget had planned to raise Stella's dhamphir children with Strauss as a surrogate mother. Once the truth behind events that happened a thousand years ago comes to light, she apologizes to Strauss and returns to him as his daughter.

Jin Renka (刃 蓮火, Jin Renka)

Age: ~600
One of Bridget's followers and the best swordsman in the group; his skills are noted by Bridget to be greater than her own. After Strauss defeats Yuki, the 49th Black Swan and Renka's love interest, Renka swears to avenge her. However, Renka's hatred is so great that he will not hesitate in revealing the existence of dhampire and vampires to the entire human world, which would rekindle the vampire hunts. In a reckless fight against Strauss, Renka was unable to hit the vampire king even once while Strauss cut Renka 25 times. Renka realizes exactly how heavy Strauss' mental burden is, and the dhampire knows that he could never win against the former king armed only with pure rage. Afterwards, Renka starts to retain his composure and becomes curious of Strauss' past and is direct in asking Bridget about the king's past.
In combat, Renka uses two sacred swords, Koryū and Kinyou as well as Narutsuki, a sacred katana capable of disrupting the spirit powers of Strauss and the Black Swan. Despite four hundred years of training, his swordsmanship is still unrefined and lacking compared to that of Strauss. For Kayuki's final battle against Strauss, he lends her Narutsuki so she will not feel as though her victory is decided against the vampire king merely because she is the Black Swan.

Tessenji Fuuhaku (鉄扇寺 風伯, Tessenji Fuuhaku)

Age: ~600
One of the dhampires on Bridget's team. He wears a full-body samurai armor suit. In his free time, Tessenji runs a food stall that has good food but few patrons due to his armor. Tessenji is well versed in the daily workings of the dhampire community and its rumors. In fighting, Tessenji is equally skilled in using a long spear for close range fighting and a bow and arrow set to strike from a distance. He rarely speaks but is the tallest and most forbidding of the dhampire fighting team. He is the only dhampire to see Strauss' duel against Renka and is terrified that the vampire could beat Renka so easily by swordsmanship alone.

Ethelbart Takahashi (エセルバート 高橋, Ederubāto Takahashi)

Age: ~ almost 300
Nicknamed Ethel, Takahashi is youngest dhampire on Bridget's team. He has the appearance of a high school student and fights using a large scythe that excels in wide area damage. He is still relatively new to fighting Strauss and hesitates when forced to hurt children like Laetitia. He has very little vampire blood in him; therefore, he is best suited to traveling in daylight. Thus, Takahashi commonly runs errands for Bridget, which includes bringing data from the dhamphires' information department. He frequents Tessenji's food stand.

Laeticia (レティシア, Reishia)

Age: 68
A dhampire orphan girl who gave Strauss refuge at her mountain home during his battle against the 49th Black Swan. Laetitia is only quarter vampire, being the child of a dhampire and a human. She later accompanies Strauss and becomes his charge and loyal companion. Unlike other dhampires, Laetitia has little magical or spiritual ability and relies more on firearms with bullets infused with Strauss' magic. While she is the weakest of the dhampires seen, she is still able to outfly a military helicopter. Laetitia acts as Strauss' eyes and ears when the vampire king cannot move about freely. She is also the only one who believes in Strauss even after learning from Bridget of Strauss' betrayal. Bridget nicknames Laetitia 'Mountain Cat' and personally begins training Laeticia's dhamphir powers so she won't be a hindrance.

=== Black Swan ===
The Black Swan is a curse created by humans to seek out and destroy Strauss. It is a spiritual parasite; its host is usually young, beautiful girls. It travels from host to host, forcing the wielder to hunt Strauss or die within five years, and it carries the memories and spiritual power of all previous hosts. The Black Swan will continue to exist until the Vampire King and his queen are eliminated; thus, the only way for the host of the Black Swan to survive is for both Strauss and Adelheid to die. The initial catalyst for the spell was Stella and her unborn child, who were killed by Maria Saberhagen to create the Black Swan.

Kayuki Hirasaka (比良坂花雪, Hirasaka Kayuki)

Age: 17
The 50th Black Swan, the first Black Swan to be able to surpass Strauss and completely neutralize his power; however, her lack of control over her powers means that she cannot defeat the Dhamphires. Though she wants to protect her grandfather by controlling the Vampire King, Kayuki is often unsettled by Strauss' enigmatic nature. Her face bears an uncanny resemblance to Yuki and Stella Hazelburke, although their personalities are quite different. Like her grandfather, Kayuki was first introduced wearing a mask because she was 'shy'. She is usually seen wearing a kimono. While Kayuki is extremely mature for her age, she is not always in perfect control of herself. It is eventually revealed that she was an ordinary girl who was badly injured and paralyzed during an accident. Inheriting the Black Swan curse healed all her injuries and GM Gozen appeared, claiming to be her grandfather and guiding her as she learned her new abilities as the Black Swan. Beneath her stoic demeanor, she had been secretly thrilled at the thought of being a hero, saving the world from vampires.
Kayuki sometimes delves into the Black Swan's accumulated memories to gain a better understanding of Strauss; however, the Black Swan has few memories of who Strauss is as a person. Kayuki knows that such actions will cut her already shortened lifespan. She has shown several instances of sympathizing with Strauss and wanting to learn more about him as a human, even to the point that she doubts her goals. These actions eventually make it hard for her to kill him. Strauss is aware of her shortening lifespan in pursuit of knowledge and warns her against it, trying to force her to view him as an enemy rather than a friend in order to spare her the pain when his death comes. On several occasions, Kayuki attacks Strauss out of anger or in an attempt to discipline the disobedient vampire king. Her level of stress continues to build because of the tension from watching Strauss and the extensive use of the Black Swan's powers. Strauss predicts she will die far sooner to than any of the previous Black Swans.

Yuki Komatsubara (小松原ユキ, Komatsubara Yuki)

The 49th Black Swan; the first to be as powerful as Strauss. Renka knew her even before she became the Black Swan and while he cared deeply for her, she regarded him as a hapless younger brother. Her death serves as the catalyst for Renka's revenge oath and deteriorating mental condition. Even though she is underage, Yuki appears to have grown addicted to smoking cigarettes. After her death, Renka started carrying her favorite lighter even though it has long since run out of fluid. Despite her bleak future and suffering, she remained cheerful and optimistic; had his child lived, Strauss believes that she would have grown to become like Yuki. Because of Kayuki's strong resemblance to Yuki, Renka initially finds her presence unsettling.

Emily (エミリー)

Age: 17
The 2nd Black Swan. She appeared thirteen years after the first and was terrified of the curse.

Cynthia (シンシア, Shinshia)

The 1st Black Swan. The adopted daughter of Maria Saverhagen, she calmly accepted her situation. She met Bridget, was killed by Akabara a year afterward. At that time, the Black Swan was only able to deflect half of Bridget's attack, which shredded all her clothes. When she is defeated by Strauss, he realizes the true nature of the Black Swan and its connection to Stella and his unborn child.

=== Humans ===
GM Gozen (GM御前)

GM Gozen is the leader of the human world and Kayuki's grandfather. He claims that GM stands for Great Mask. He plans to use Strauss and Adelheid to destroy the aliens attempt to invade the Earth before finishing them off. Gozen admits that the most frightening moment in his life was when he had to match wits with Strauss. Strauss' death is his top priority and thus commands Morishima to tell his granddaughter lies to ensure that she is willing to kill the vampire king. He is absolutely sure that Kayuki has the power and brains to kill Strauss at any time without question.

Merill Morishima (メリル森島)

The military person assigned by GM Gozen and in charge of repelling the alien invasion. He has a sharp mind and is the first person to discern the truth behind Strauss' motives relating to the fall of the Kingdom of the Night. Despite his laid back attitude and unimposing appearance, he is a formidable man whom Bridget respects.

Nazuna Hagi (萩 なずな, Hagi Nazuna)

Age: 25
A scientist working on the shuttle project to prevent the aliens of the Fio Civilization from taking over the Earth. She is an energetic young woman who becomes fascinated by Kayuki and Strauss' abilities. She and reluctant Li eventually agree to help Strauss collect information when his actions are limited from being forced to stay on the research facility's island. However, Nazuna remains suspicious of Strauss' true motives.

Li Honhuei (李 紅飛)

Age: 35
One of the scientists working on the shuttle project at the research facility along with his partner, Nazuna. He is amazed by Strauss' intelligence and ability to understand the science and engineering involved with the space mission and allows Strauss to offer suggestions to improve. Li becomes frightened of the vampire king when it is revealed that Strauss cannot be harmed by the sun, but diligently agrees to Strauss' challenge to determine what stone was used to make Stella's necklace in exchange for Strauss agreeing to save the Earth from the alien invaders.

Stella

Stella Hazelberg (ステラ·ヘイゼルバーグ, Sutera Heizerubagu)

Age: 18
A country girl who could neither read nor write. While Strauss was still a general, she was his human lover and Strauss continues to carry a pendant he made for her when she was alive. She was adopted by the Hazelberg family prior to her marriage to Strauss. Stella and her unborn child (Strauss was the child's father) were later brutally murdered; their deaths forever plunged Strauss into a depth of despair. The circumstances of her death become a long-standing mystery of the series, which are eventually fully disclosed to the audience through Adelheid's confession and later when Stella herself tells Kayuki how it occurred: She was killed by Maria Saberhagen and used as a catalyst to create the Black Swan. While her unborn daughter, who carried the blood of Strauss, would have the potential power to someday defeat Strauss, Stella was sacrificed as well as her consciousness at the core of the Black Swan was required to keep the infant child's temperament in check. Because Stella and her baby form the core of the Black Swan, the parasitic nature of the spell resulted in selecting girls who possessed a strong resemblance to either Stella or her baby. Strauss discovered the true nature of the Black Swan shortly after the death of the first Black Swan and though initially enraged that her spirit and their child's had been used in such a manner, he and Stella managed to communicate over the years in hopes of ending Strauss's pain, as well saving the dhamphirs and the hosts of the Black Swan. She is revealed to be an adopted daughter of Maria Saverhagen.

Maria Saverhagen (マリア・セイバーハーゲン, Maria Seibahagen)

An enemy of Strauss during the time of the Kingdom of the Night, known as "Infinite Cross Saberhagen" and is the only human Bridget ever considered to be near Strauss' level of skill. Saberhagen saw Strauss as the Red Rose of Disaster and sought to defeat him no matter what tricks she had to resort to. She eventually created the curse of the Black Swan and led an alliance of countries against the Kingdom of the Night, demanding Strauss' execution. Saberhagen was also responsible for creating the spell to seal away Adelheid when she went berserk and unleashed the Moonlight of Corrosion. Despite caring deeply for the children she adopted as wards, including Stella, her ruthless pragmatism caused her to do various despicable acts, such as kill Stella as a sacrifice to defeat Strauss. Before her death, after her last encounter with Strauss, Saverhagen was the first person to listen to Strauss's reasons to become the common enemy of both humans and his own kind where he was able to prevent an endless war with the two sides.

== Media ==
=== Manga ===
Written by Kyo Shirodaira and Illustrated by Yuri Kimura, The Record of a Fallen Vampire was serialized in Square Enix's manga magazine Monthly Shōnen Gangan from 2003 to 2007. Its chapters were collected in nine tankōbon volumes. released between December 22, 2003, and April 21, 2007.

It has been licensed in English by Viz Media and Yen Press. In June 2025, the series was added to Manga Up! Global.

A sequel titled Vampire Jūji-Kai: Inu ni wa Inu no Uta (ヴァンパイア十字界 犬には犬の歌, Vanpaia Jūji-Kai: Inu ni wa Inu no Uta) began serialization in Monthly Shōnen Gangan on October 9, 2026.

==== Volumes ====
No.	Original release date	Original ISBN	English release date	English ISBN
1	December 22, 2003	4-7575-1105-1	May 13, 2008	978-1-4215-1773-5
2	May 22, 2004	4-7575-1206-6	August 12, 2008	978-1-4215-1774-2
3	October 22, 2004	4-7575-1297-X	November 11, 2008	978-1-4215-1775-9
4	March 22, 2005	4-7575-1387-9	February 10, 2009	978-1-4215-1776-6
5	September 22, 2005	4-7575-1523-5	May 12, 2009	978-1-4215-1777-3
6	February 22, 2006	4-7575-1625-8	August 11, 2009	978-1-4215-2228-9
7	July 22, 2006	4-7575-1721-1	November 10, 2009	978-1-4215-2229-6
8	December 22, 2006	4-7575-1823-4	February 2, 2010	978-1-4215-2901-1
9	April 21, 2007	4-7575-1992-3	May 4, 2010	978-1-4215-2902-8

==== Yen Press English release ====
No.	English release date	English ISBN
1	December 30, 2014	978-0316385381
2	December 30, 2014	978-0316385404
3	December 30, 2014	978-0316385428
4	December 30, 2014	978-0316385442
5	December 30, 2014	978-0316385473
6	December 30, 2014	978-0316385497
7	December 30, 2014	978-0316385510
8	December 30, 2014	978-0316385534
9	December 30, 2014	978-0316385565

=== Anime ===
An anime television series adaptation was announced on October 5, 2026. The series will be produced by Zero-G and Liber and directed and written by Mankyū, with characters designed by Jimao and music composed by Evan Call. It is set to premiere in 2027.
