= Grand Blue Dreaming =

Japanese manga series and its adaptations

- First tankōbon volume cover

ぐらんぶる (Guran Buru)
- Genre: Comedy; Slice of life
- Manga
- Written by: Kenji Inoue
- Illustrated by: Kimitake Yoshioka
- Published by: Kodansha
- English publisher: NA: Kodansha USA
- Imprint: Good! Afternoon KC
- Magazine: Good! Afternoon
- Original run: April 7, 2014 – present
- Volumes: 27
- Anime television series
- Directed by: Shinji Takamatsu
- Produced by: Kazuaki Takahashi; Toshihiro Suzuki; Toshihiro Maeda (S1); Shin Furukawa (S1); Ryōhei Suzuki (S1); Yōko Baba (S1); Gōta Aijima (S1); Kazuto Matsumura (S1); Youichi Kurashima (S2); Akira Yonezawa (S2); Sachiya Sakikawa (S2); Kei Takamoto (S2); Hiroto Sakami (S2); Hideyuki Kachi (S2)
- Written by: Shinji Takamatsu; Kenji Inoue (S1, EP 9)
- Music by: Manual of Errors (S1); Yukari Hashimoto (S2)
- Studio: Zero-G; Liber (S2); Saber Works (S3)
- Licensed by: Amazon Prime Video (former; S1 only); Crunchyroll (current); SEA: Tropics Entertainment
- Original network: MBS (S1–3); TBS, BS-TBS, ITV, MRO (S1); AT-X (S1 & 3); Tokyo MX, BS11 (S2 & 3)
- English network: SEA: Animax Asia
- Original run: July 14, 2018 – present
- Episodes: 36
- Live-action film

Grand Blue
- Directed by: Tsutomu Hanabusa
- Written by: Tsutomu Hanabusa; Manabu Uda
- Music by: Michiru; Toru Ishitsuka; Teje; Shunsuke Suzuki
- Studio: Warner Bros. Pictures
- Released: August 7, 2020
- Runtime: 107 minutes
- icon

Grand Blue Dreaming, also known simply as Grand Blue (Japanese: ぐらんぶる, Hepburn: Guran Buru), is a Japanese manga series written by Kenji Inoue and illustrated by Kimitake Yoshioka. It is serialized in Kodansha's seinen manga magazine Good! Afternoon since April 2014, with its chapters collected in 27 tankōbon volumes as of October 2026. The manga is published in English by Kodansha USA under the Kodansha Comics imprint. An anime television series adaptation by Zero-G aired from July to September 2018. A live-action film adaptation was released in August 2020. A second anime season by Zero-G and Liber aired from July to September 2025. A third season by Zero-G and Saber Works aired from July to September 2026. A fourth season has been announced.

== Plot ==
Iori Kitahara looks forward to his new life on the Izu Peninsula as he prepares to start his college life there, staying in a room above his uncle's diving shop "Grand Blue." However, he is quickly shocked as he meets the local Diving Club, a group full of buff men who spend more time drinking, partying, and stripping naked than actually diving. Despite his attempts to distance himself from the group, Iori gets quickly swept up in their antics, while his cousins try to show him the wonders of diving into the ocean and sea.

== Characters ==
=== Peek a Boo (Diving Club) ===
Iori Kitahara (北原 伊織, Kitahara Iori)
Voiced by: Yuma Uchida
Portrayed by: Ryo Ryusei (live-action film)
Iori is a first-year Mechanical Engineering student at Izu University and a member of the diving club, despite never having learned to swim. Though he attempts to live an ordinary life, he frequently finds himself drawn into the club’s chaotic activities, which often involve drunken antics. Outwardly brash and carefree, he deeply values his relationships and suppresses his flaws when necessary. Despite his father’s adoption into the Kotegawa family, he considers Chisa and Nanaka as true siblings. His genuine demeanor gradually endears him to others, though his earlier immaturity sometimes causes friction. Once an aspiring musician, he now cringes at his past attempts at songwriting. Naturally athletic, he excels in sports requiring precision, though he tends to overcomplicate simple problems with absurd theories. He occasionally cross-dresses.
Chisa Kotegawa (古手川 千紗, Kotegawa Chisa)
Voiced by: Chika Anzai
Portrayed by: Yūki Yoda (live-action film)
Chisa is Iori’s cousin and classmate at Izu University, a composed and intelligent young woman devoted to diving. Unlike the other members of the Peek a Boo club, she maintains a reserved demeanor, avoiding their rowdy behavior and showing little interest in romance. Despite her disinterest, she frequently deflects advances from fellow students. Aspiring to become a dive instructor like her mother, she prioritizes diving above all else. To maintain her independence, she manipulates situations—even pretending to be in a relationship with Iori to deter suitors or retaliate when he helps others over her. Though she shares a love of diving with Iori, their dynamic shifts between warmth and frustration due to his loud personality. Her strained relationship with her mother leaves her emotionally guarded, causing her to become flustered in vulnerable moments.
Kōhei Imamura (今村 耕平, Imamura Kōhei)
Voiced by: Ryōhei Kimura
Portrayed by: Atsuhiro Inukai (live-action film)
Kōhei is Iori’s best friend and rival, an eccentric otaku who proudly wears anime-themed shirts. He enrolls at the university chasing an unrealistic dream of attracting high school girls, but is instead drawn into the Peek a Boo club. His obsession with anime distorts his social awareness, often leading him to misinterpret real-life situations through the lens of his favorite shows. Easily manipulated by references to famous female voice actors—especially Kaya Mizuki—he becomes a frequent target of the club’s pranks. Despite his absurd demeanor, he demonstrates unexpected resolve when his interests are threatened. Though his friendship with Iori is marked by playful antagonism and boisterous clashes, he remains deeply loyal when it counts. Hints suggest he hails from a wealthy background.
Aina Yoshiwara (吉原 愛菜, Yoshiwara Aina)
Voiced by: Kana Asumi
Portrayed by: Ren Ishikawa (live-action film)
Aina is a shy Ōmi Women’s College freshman who joins Peek a Boo after Iori and Kōhei defend her from bullying at her former tennis club. Nicknamed "Cakey" for her heavy makeup, she sheds this persona upon joining, revealing a timid nature that contrasts with the club's rowdiness. Though initially interested in Kōhei, she develops feelings for Iori after he avenges her. Her farm upbringing makes her adept at manual labor but self-conscious about her rural accent. Naive about romance and insecure about her body compared to Nanaka and Azusa, she paradoxically becomes wildly uninhibited when drinking.
Ryūjirō Kotobuki (寿 竜次郎, Kotobuki Ryūjirō)
Voiced by: Katsuyuki Konishi
Portrayed by: Hiroaki Iwanaga (live-action film)
A senior student at Izu and a member of Peek a Boo who often got himself and other club members drunk and naked. Kotobuki is just like Tokita both in appearance and in personality when they are partying, but Kotobuki can be surprisingly charismatic. He works as a professional bartender part-time.
Shinji Tokita (時田 信治, Tokita Shinji)
Voiced by: Hiroki Yasumoto
Portrayed by: Suzunosuke Tanaka (live-action film)
A senior student at Izu and member of Peek a Boo who often got himself and other club members drunk and naked, Tokita is a muscular, laid-back college student who loves to party. However, just like the other members of PAB, he sincerely loves diving and takes the possible dangers seriously. To Iori's surprise, he has a girlfriend.
Azusa Hamaoka (浜岡 梓, Hamaoka Azusa)
Voiced by: Toa Yukinari
Portrayed by: Yuka Ogura (live-action film)
Azusa is a senior at Ōmi Women's College and one of the few female members in Peek a Boo's senior circle. Her natural sensuality leads younger members to assume she is sexually experienced, though her interests focus almost exclusively on Nanaka for comedic effect. While harboring unrequited feelings for Tokita, she avoids acting on them to preserve group harmony. Notoriously unconcerned with modesty, she frequently undresses without warning. She befriends Iori after mistakenly believing him to be bisexual, seeing him as a potential confidant. Despite her playful mischief that often creates humorous complications, she demonstrates genuine care and insight when helping others with personal problems.
Karina
Leader of the German Weeb Club.

=== Grand Blue (Diving Shop) ===
Nanaka Kotegawa (古手川 奈々華, Kotegawa Nanaka)
Voiced by: Maaya Uchida
Portrayed by: Aya Asahina (live-action film)
Nanaka is a diving instructor at Grand Blue and Chisa's older sister. A voluptuous yet reserved figure, she typically observes rather than participates in the diving club's rowdy activities. Her presence alone causes the members to moderate their usual drunken behavior. She states she would support Iori if he could make her sister happy. Ironically naive about sexual matters, she frequently finds herself in compromising situations with Iori and Azusa. She demonstrates terrifying physical strength when perceiving any threat to her bond with Chisa.
Toshio Kotegawa (古手川 登志夫, Kotegawa Toshio)
Voiced by: Shinji Kawada
Portrayed by: Masahiro Takashima (live-action film)
The owner of the diving shop Grand Blue and Iori's uncle, as well as the father of Chisa and Nanaka.
Kaya Mizuki (水木 カヤ, Mizuki Kaya)
Voiced by: Nana Mizuki
A famous voice actor and idol who is acquainted with Peek a Boo on account of her diving hobby. She is friends with Azusa and thinks highly of Iori. She is Kōhei's favorite voice actress.

=== Other characters ===
Captain Kudō (工藤会長, Kudō-kaichō)
Voiced by: Jun Fukuyama
Portrayed by: Yuya Hirata (live-action film)
The Captain of the Tennis Club, "Tinkerbell," and an attractive playboy who was publicly humiliated by Iori and Kōhei due to his mistreatment of Aina.
Hajime Nojima (野島 元, Nojima Hajime)
Voiced by: Takuya Eguchi
Portrayed by: Yūki Morinaga (live-action film)
One of Iori's classmates at Izu University. A self-styled playboy who is largely unsuccessful in attracting a lover. Although he tries to be charismatic, it usually comes off as lame.
Shinichirō Yamamoto (山本 信一郎, Yamamoto Shin'ichirō)
Voiced by: Junya Enoki
Portrayed by: Yūma Yamoto (live-action film)
One of Iori's classmates at Izu University. Incredibly blunt in his desire to find a girlfriend, he is often teased by his friends that he will be a lifelong virgin.
Kenta Fujiwara (藤原 健太, Fujiwara Kenta)
Voiced by: Robert Waterman
One of Iori's classmates at Izu University. A muscular man, and the most decent and innocent of Iori's friends. He is often portrayed as invisible to other significant characters as a running joke.
Yū Mitarai (御手洗 優, Mitarai Yū)
Voiced by: Natsuki Hanae
One of Iori's classmates at Izu University. Unlike most of the others, Yu is in a relationship with his childhood friend Rie, which his friends immediately attempt to sabotage once they find out. Through a self-destructive desire to flirt or his friends' machinations, he finds himself beaten up by Rie on multiple occasions.
Shiori Kitahara (北原 栞, Kitahara Shiori)
Voiced by: Sumire Morohoshi
Iori's little sister, a third-year middle school student who often walks around in an old-fashioned kimono. She pretends to show affection to Iori while secretly trying to mold him into taking ownership of their family's ryokan so she will not have to, as she seeks to escape the stringent demands placed upon her by her parents. Shiori is unusually cunning and intelligent for her age, able to construct surveillance equipment as well as maintain a facade as an impeccably mannered young girl who dotes on her brother. She later develops genuine respect for Iori, although she still dismisses him as dim-witted and irresponsible.
Naomi Otoya (乙矢 尚海, Otoya Naomi)
Voiced by: Yoshino Aoyama
Iori's co-worker, and a high-school student. He is passionate about diving and is the president of the diving club at his school. He secretly likes Iori.
Sakurako Busujima (毒島 桜子, Busujima Sakurako)
Voiced by: Aya Yamane
A student at Oumi Women's University. She is focused on good looks, both for herself and her partners.
Sayaka Kotegawa (古手川紗耶華, Kotegawa Sayaka)
Voiced by: Sayaka Ohara
Chief (チーフ, Chīfu)
Voiced by: Asami Seto
Maki (マキ)
Voiced by: Aya Suzaki

== Media ==
=== Manga ===
Written by Kenji Inoue and illustrated by Kimitake Yoshioka, Grand Blue Dreaming started in Kodansha's seinen manga magazine Good! Afternoon on April 7, 2014. Kodansha has compiled its chapters into individual tankōbon volumes. The first volume was released on November 7, 2014. As of October 2026, 27 volumes have been released.

Kodansha USA is publishing the series in both digital and print format, with 23 volumes published as of December 2, 2025.

==== Volumes ====
| No. | Original release date | Original ISBN | English release date | English ISBN |
|---|---|---|---|---|
| 1 | November 7, 2014 | 978-4-06-387990-2 | July 10, 2018 | 978-1-63236-666-5 |
1. "Deep Blue" (ディープブルー, Dīpu Burū); 2. "Welcoming Party" (新歓コンパ, Shinkan Konpa); 3. "My Own Room" (マイルーム, Mairūmu); 4. "Underwear" (水の中で, Mizu no Naka de)
| 2 | December 5, 2014 | 978-4-06-388018-2 | September 11, 2018 | 978-1-63236-667-2 |
5. "A New World" (新世界, Shin Sekai); 6. "Order Woman" (年上の女, Toshiue no Onna); 7. "Miss Izu" (ミスコン, Misukon); 8. "Mister Izu" (男コン, Dan Kon); Side Story: "Idiots, Tests and Cheating" (バカとテストとカンニング, Baka to Tesuto to Kanningu)
| 3 | April 7, 2015 | 978-4-06-388053-3 | November 27, 2018 | 978-1-63236-668-9 |
9. "The After-Festival" (後の祭り, Ato no Matsuri); 10. "The Mixer" (合コン, Gōkon); 11. "First Buddy" (初バディ, Hatsu Badi); 12. "Doubles" (ダブルス, Daburusu); Side Story: "A Normal Drinking Party" (普通の飲み会, Futsū no Nomikai)
| 4 | September 7, 2015 | 978-4-06-388081-6 | February 19, 2019 | 978-1-63236-740-2 |
13. "Drinking at Home" (部屋飲み, Heya Nomi); 14. "A Man's Cocktail" (男のカクテル, Otoko no Kakuteru); 15. "Shopping!" (ショッピング!, Shoppingu!); 16. "Okinawa Landing" (沖縄上陸, Okinawa Jōriku); 17. "A Place Without Lies" (ウソのない場所, Uso no Nai Basho)
| 5 | February 5, 2016 | 978-4-06-388115-8 | April 2, 2019 | 978-1-63236-724-2 |
18. "It's All A Misunderstanding" (誤解なんだが, Gokaina Ndaga); 19. "Trial" (試練, Shiren); 20. "Boat Diving" (ボートダイビング, Bōto Daibingu); 21. "Otori" (オートリ, Otōri); Side Story: "Unity" (団結, Danketsu)
| 6 | August 5, 2016 | 978-4-06-388164-6 | May 21, 2019 | 978-1-63236-725-9 |
22. "Girls' Night" (女子会, Joshi Kai); 23. "The Ticket Contest" (チケット争奪戦, Chiketto Sōdatsu-sen); 24. "First Trip To a Women's University" (はじめての女子大, Hajimete no Joshidai); 25. "Women's University, Revisited" (再びの女子大, Futatabi no Joshidai); Side Story: "Letter" (手紙, Tegami)
| 7 | December 7, 2016 | 978-4-06-388220-9 | July 2, 2019 | 978-1-63236-792-1 |
26. "Housesitting" (留守番, Rusuban); 27. "Little Sister" (妹, Imōto); 28. "Big Brother" (兄, Ani); Side Story: "Mahjong" (麻雀, Mājan)
| 8 | April 7, 2017 | 978-4-06-388249-0 | October 29, 2019 | 978-1-63236-837-9 |
29. "The Impression Game" (印象ゲーム, Inshō Gēmu); 30. "I'm Not Stripping, Okay?" (脱がないよ?, Nuganai yo?); 31. "Associate Professor" (准教授, Jun Kyōju); 32. "Charpy Impact Test" (シャルピー衝撃試験, Sharupī Shōgeki Shiken); 33. "School Camping for Adults" (大人の林間学校, Otona no Rinkan Gakkō)
| 9 | October 6, 2017 | 978-4-06-388290-2 | January 7, 2020 | 978-1-63236-812-6 |
34. "Coworkers" (バイト仲間, Baito Nakama); 35. "Otoya-kun Sees All" (乙矢(おとや)君にはよく見えている。, Otoya-kun ni wa Yoku Miete Iru); 36. "Do You Like Him?" (好きなの?, Suki na no?); 37. "Serious" (本気, Honki)
| 10 | March 7, 2018 | 978-4-06-511096-6 | April 28, 2020 | 978-1-63236-910-9 |
38. "Movie Date" (映画デート, Eiga Dēto); 39. "Auction House" (オークションハウス, Ōkushon Hausu); 40. "White Lab" (ホワイト研, Howaito-ken); 41. "Let's Go to an Uninhabited Island!" (無人島へ行こう!, Mujintō e yukō!); Side Story: "Group Discussion" (グループディスカッション, Gurūpu disukasshon)
| 11 | July 6, 2018 | 978-4-06-511979-2 | October 13, 2020 | 978-1-63236-949-9 |
42. "Fun on an Uninhabited Island" (無人島で遊ぼう!, Mujintō de Asobō!); 43. "Let's Survive on an Uninhabited Island!" (無人島を生き抜こう!, Mujintō o Ikinukō); 44. "Life Consultation" (人生相談, Jinsei Sōdan); 45. "Now We're Even" (これでチャラ, Kore de Chara); Side Story: "Café Pilgrimage" (カフェ巡り, Kafe Meguri)
| 12 | November 22, 2018 | 978-4-06-513447-4 | March 9, 2021 | 978-1-64651-043-6 |
46. "Unfinished Business" (やり残し, Yari Nokoshi); 47. "Homecoming" (帰省, Kisei); 48. "Saving Private Passport" (パスポート奪還作戦, Pasupōto Dakkan Sakusen); 49. "Hentai"; 49.5. "Off to Palau" (パラオへ, Parao e)
| 13 | June 22, 2019 | 978-4-06-516238-5 | June 22, 2021 | 978-1-64651-044-3 |
50. "Reunion" (再会, Saikai); 51. "The Seas of Palau" (パラオの海, Parao no Umi); 52. "TV Special" (TV取材, TV Shuzai); 53. "Filming" (収録現場, Shūroku Genba); Side Story: "Lie Detector" (ウソ発見器, Uso Hakken-ki)
| 14 | November 22, 2019 | 978-4-06-517557-6 | October 26, 2021 | 978-1-64651-142-6 |
54. "Wingman" (アシスト, Ashisuto); 55. "Girl Talk" (女子トーク, Joshi Tōku); 56. "Fun Dive" (ファンダイビング, Fan Daibingu); 57. "Mom" (お母さん, Okā-san); Side Story: "Truth or Dare Jenga" (黒のジェンガ, Kuro no Jenga)
| 15 | May 22, 2020 | 978-4-06-519480-5 | March 8, 2022 (print); April 19, 2022 (digital) | 978-1-64651-207-2 |
58. "The End of Summer Vacation" (夏休み明け, Natsuyasumi-ake); 59. "Mixer-Round Two" (合コンround2, Gōkon Round 2); 60. "Chestnut Picking" (栗拾い, Kurihiroi); 61. "Lottery" (宝くじ, Takarakuji); Side Story: "The Art of Escape" (エスケヰプ之スヽメ, Esukewipu no Susume)
| 16 | November 20, 2020 | 978-4-06-521417-6 | July 19, 2022 (print); June 14, 2022 (digital) | 978-1-64651-402-1 |
62. "War Council" (作戦会議, Sakusen Kaigi); 63. "Okinawa Revisited" (沖縄再上陸, Okinawa Sai Jōriku); 64. "Okinawa Revisited (Pt. 2)" (沖縄再上陸 (裏), Okinawa Sai Jōriku (Ura)); 65. "Day Two Chaos" (二日目のカオス, Futsuka-me no Kaosu); Side Story: "Puppy" (犬, Inu)
| 17 | August 5, 2021 | 978-4-06-524292-6 | October 4, 2022 | 978-1-64651-403-8 |
66. "Sakurako's Journey" (桜子の旅, Sakurako no Tabi); 67. "Shit!" (シット!, Shitto!); 68. "Who Likes Who?" (好きな人, Sukinahito); 69. "Two Returning" (帰りの二人, Kaeri no Futari)
| 18 | March 7, 2022 | 978-4-06-527041-7 | February 21, 2023 | 978-1-64651-699-5 |
70. "Death Game" (デスゲーム, Desu Gēmu); 71. "Bedtime Calisthenics" (深夜体操, Shinya Taisō); 72. "Sorrow - Another Round" (哀しみアナザーラウンド, Kanashimi Anazā Raundo); 73. "Rebound Challenge" (推し変チャレンジ, Oshi Hen Charenji); Side Story: "Cafeteria 1" (第一食堂, Dai Ichi Shokudō)
| 19 | August 5, 2022 | 978-4-06-528768-2 | June 6, 2023 | 978-1-64651-700-8 |
74. "Hypnosis Crisis" (ヒプノシスクライシス, Hipunoshisu Kuraishisu); 75. "Dress-Up" (ドレスアップ, Doresu Appu); 76. "Wedding Reception" (結婚パーティー, Kekkon Pātī); 77. "Catfight" (キャットファイト, Kyattofaito); Side Story: "The Passion of Ichiro Yamamoto" (山本真一郎の受難, Yamamoto Shin'ichirō no Junan)
| 20 | April 6, 2023 | 978-4-06-531329-9 | November 19, 2024 | 979-8-88877-046-7 |
78. "Theme Park" (Note: Titled "Amusement Park" on the K Manga digital service.) (テーマパーク, Tēma Pāku); 79. "White Counseling Office" (ホワイト相談室, Howaito Sōdan-Shitsu); 80. "Forward!" (Note: Titled "Advance!" on the K Manga digital service.) (アドヴァンス!, Adovansu!); 81. "Shark Scramble" (シャークスクランブル, Shāku Sukuranburu); Side Story: "The Passion of Hajime Nojima" (野島元の受難, Nojima Hajime no Junan)
| 21 | October 5, 2023 | 978-4-06-533089-0 | February 11, 2025 | 979-8-88877-047-4 |
82. "A True Striker" (真のストライカー, Shin no Sutoraikā); 83. "A Woman's Advances" (据え膳, Suezen); 84. "Reminiscence!" (昔話, Mukashibanashi); 85. "Halloween" (ハロウィン, Harowin)
| 22 | April 5, 2024 | 978-4-06-535017-1 | June 24, 2025 | 979-8-88877-048-1 |
86. "No Reaction Game" (ノーリアクションゲーム, Nō Riakushon Gēmu); 87. "Wakeboarding!" (ウェイクボード, Weikubōdo); 88. "Assassin" (刺客, Shikaku); 89. "Sakurako Busujima" (毒島桜子, Busujima Sakurako); Side Story: "Drunken Ping-Pong" (泥酔卓球, Deisui Takkyū)
| 23 | October 7, 2024 | 978-4-06-537098-8 | December 2, 2025 | 979-8-88877-521-9 |
90. "Presentation" (プレゼンテーション, Purezentēshon); 91. "Inspection!" (視察, Shisatsu); 92. "Izu Fall Festival!" (伊豆秋祭, Izu Akimatsuri); 93. "Entry!" (エントリー, Entorī); 94. "Answer" (返事, Henji)
| 24 | April 7, 2025 | 978-4-06-538970-6 | August 18, 2026 | 979-8-89830-150-7 |
95. "The Night Is Still Young" (終わらない夜, Owaranai Yoru); 96. "Collective Intelligence" (集合知, Shūgō Chi); 97. "Dressed for Success" (履いてる, Hai teru); 98. "Risk Factor" (危険分子, Kiken Bunshi); Side Story: "The Passion of Yuu Mitarai" (御手洗優の受難, Mitarai Yū no Junan)
| 25 | October 7, 2025 | 978-4-06-540962-6 | — | — |
99. "Proposal!" (プロポーズ, Puropōzu); 100. "Anniversary!" (記念日, Kinenbi); 101. "Influencer" (インフルエンサー, Infuruensā); 102. "Proselytism" (宗教勧誘, Shūkyō Kanyū); 103. "Congratulatory Gift" (ご祝儀, Goshukugi)
| 26 | April 7, 2026 | 978-4-06-543035-4 | — | — |
104. "Spooky Stuff" (怖いもの, Kowaimono); 105. "The Pinnacle of Flavor" (至高の味, Shikō no Aji); 106. "Birds of a Feather" (似た者同士, Nitamono Dōshi); Side Story: "Hero Show" (ヒーローショー, Hīrō Shō)
| 27 | October 7, 2026 | 978-4-06-545096-3 | — | — |
107. "Aphrodisiac" (媚薬, Biyaku); 108. "Escape" (逃避, Tōhi); 109. "Blackout!" (ブラックアウト, Burakkuauto); 110. "Go Time" (ヤる時, Yaru Toki); 111. "Misunderstanding" (勘違い, Kanchigai); Side Story: "AI Camera" (AIカメラ, AI Kamera)

=== Anime ===
An anime television series adaptation was announced in March 2018. It is produced by Zero-G, directed and written by Shinji Takamatsu, with Takamatsu also handling sound direction, and Hideoki Kusama designing the characters. The series aired from July 14 to September 29, 2018, on the Animeism programming block on MBS, TBS and BS-TBS, as well as other networks. (Note: MBS and TBS listed the series premiere on July 13 at 26:25, which is effectively July 14 at 2:25 a.m. JST.) The opening theme song is "Grand Blue", performed by Shōnan no Kaze, while the ending theme song is "Konpeki no al Fine" (紺碧のアル・フィーネ), performed by Izu no Kaze (a group formed by Yūma Uchida, Ryohei Kimura, Hiroki Yasumoto, and Katsuyuki Konishi). The first season was streamed exclusively on Amazon Prime Video worldwide.

In September 2024, a second season was announced, with Takamatsu returning as director and scriptwriter, and Liber joining Zero-G for animation production. The season aired from July 8 to September 23, 2025, on Tokyo MX and other networks. (Note: Tokyo MX and BS11 listed the second season's premiere on July 7 at 24:30, which is effectively July 8 at 12:30 a.m. JST.) The opening theme song is Seishun Towa (青春永遠; 'Eternal Youth'), performed by Shōnan no Kaze featuring Atarashii Gakko!, while the ending theme song is "Hadaka de Dotsukiai" (裸でどつきあい; 'Let's Punch Each Other While Naked'), performed by Seamo featuring May'n. Crunchyroll is streaming the second season. Tropics Entertainment licensed the series in Southeast Asia for streaming on Tropics Anime Asia YouTube channel.

After the airing of the final episode of the second season, a third season was announced. It takes place in fictional Palau. The season is produced by Zero-G and Saber Works, with Takamatsu returning as director. It aired from July 7 to September 22, 2026. (Note: Tokyo MX and BS11 listed the third season's premiere on July 6 at 24:00, which is effectively July 7 at midnight JST.) The opening theme song is "Natsuko" (夏子), performed by Funky Monkey Babys, while the ending theme song is "Hadaka no Mermaid" (裸のマーメード; 'Naked Mermaid'), performed by Mameshiba no Taigun.

After the airing of the final episode of the third season, a fourth season was announced.

=== Film ===
A live-action film adaptation was announced in November 2019. It was directed by Tsutomu Hanabusa, and originally scheduled to release on May 29, 2020; however, it was postponed to August 7 of that same year, due to the COVID-19 pandemic.

== Reception ==
By April 2023, the manga series had over 8 million volumes in circulation.

== See also ==
- Baka and Test, a light novel series written by Kenji Inoue
- TenPuru, another manga series illustrated by Kimitake Yoshioka
