= Mechanical Marie =

Japanese manga series

- First tankōbon volume cover

機械じかけのマリー (Kikaijikake no Marī)
- Genre: Romantic comedy
- Manga
- Written by: Aki Akimoto
- Published by: Hakusensha
- English publisher: NA: Yen Press
- Imprint: Hana to Yume Comics
- Magazine: LaLa
- Original run: June 24, 2020 – June 23, 2023
- Volumes: 6
- Manga

Mechanical Marie+
- Written by: Aki Akimoto
- Published by: Hakusensha
- Imprint: Hana to Yume Comics
- Magazine: LaLa
- Original run: April 24, 2025 – December 24, 2025
- Volumes: 2
- Anime television series
- Directed by: Junji Nishimura
- Written by: Mariko Kunisawa
- Music by: Yasuharu Takanashi; Johannes Nilsson
- Studio: Zero-G; Liber
- Licensed by: Crunchyroll; SEA: Medialink
- Original network: Tokyo MX, ytv, BS Fuji
- Original run: October 5, 2025 – December 21, 2025
- Episodes: 12
- icon

Mechanical Marie (Japanese: 機械じかけのマリー, Hepburn: Kikaijikake no Marī) is a Japanese manga series written and illustrated by Aki Akimoto. It was originally a one-shot published in Hakusensha's shōjo manga magazine LaLa in March 2020, before being serialized in the same magazine from June 2020 to June 2023. Its chapters have been collected into six tankōbon volumes. An anime television series adaptation produced by Zero-G and Liber aired from October to December 2025.

== Plot ==
Arthur, the heir to the Zetes Corporation, has become misanthropic because his jealous stepbrother Maynard constantly sends assassins after him. Marie, a destitute, stoic, and incredibly strong martial artist is hired by Arthur's butler Roy to serve him while pretending to be a robot. Marie struggles with her growing feelings towards Arthur and the stress of maintaining her lie while regularly protecting him from assassins.

== Characters ==
Marie (マリー, Marī)
Voiced by: Nao Tōyama
Arthur (アーサー, Āsā)
Voiced by: Haruki Ishiya
Marie 2 (マリー2, Marī 2)
Voiced by: Ami Koshimizu
Noah (ノア, Noa)
Voiced by: Chiaki Kobayashi
Roy (ロイ, Roi)
Voiced by: Yūichirō Umehara
Maynard (メイナード, Meinādo)
Voiced by: Daishi Kajita
Bridget (ブリジット, Burijitto)
Voiced by: Saima Nakano
Isabel (イザベル, Izaberu)
Voiced by: Yō Taichi
Toby (トビー, Tobī)
Voiced by: Shuntaro Hara
Old Man Carl (カールおじさん, Kāru Ojisan)
Voiced by: Kappei Yamaguchi
Old Lady Charlotte (シャーロットおばさん, Shārotto Obasan)
Voiced by: Rieko Takahashi

== Media ==
=== Manga ===
Written and illustrated by Aki Akimoto, Mechanical Marie was initially a one-shot published in Hakusensha's LaLa magazine on March 24, 2020. It was later serialized in the same magazine from June 24, 2020, to June 23, 2023. Six tankōbon volumes were released from December 2020 to September 2023. In February 2025, Yen Press announced that it licensed the series for English publication.

A sequel series, titled Mechanical Marie+ (機械じかけのマリー+, Kikaijikake no Marī Purasu), was serialized in LaLa from April 24 to December 24, 2025. The sequel has been collected in two tankōbon volumes.

==== Volumes ====
===== Mechanical Marie =====
No.	Original release date	Original ISBN	English release date	English ISBN
1	December 4, 2020	978-4-592-22081-7	August 26, 2025	979-8-8554-0785-3
2	June 4, 2021	978-4-592-22082-4	February 24, 2026	979-8-8554-0787-7
3	December 3, 2021	978-4-592-22083-1	August 25, 2026	979-8-8554-0789-1
4	July 5, 2022	978-4-592-22084-8	January 26, 2027	979-8-8554-0791-4
5	February 3, 2023	978-4-592-22085-5	—	—
6	September 5, 2023	978-4-592-22154-8	—	—

===== Mechanical Marie+ =====
No.	Japanese release date	Japanese ISBN
1	October 3, 2025	978-4-592-22294-1
2	March 5, 2026	978-4-592-22295-8

=== Anime ===
An anime television series adaptation was announced on August 5, 2024. It is produced by Zero-G and Liber, and directed by Junji Nishimura, with scripts written by Mariko Kunisawa, characters designed by Yoko Kikuchi, and music composed by Yasuharu Takanashi and Johannes Nilsson. The series aired on Tokyo MX from October 5 to December 21, 2025; it was also broadcast on ytv and BS Fuji. The opening theme song is "Honto to Uso" (ホントトウソ; 'Truth and Lies'), performed by Harutya, and the ending theme song is "Cross Heart: Itsuwari no Nai Kimochi" (Cross heart〜偽りのない気持ち; 'Cross Heart: Feelings with No Lies'), performed by Nao Tōyama as her character Marie. (Note: A duet version of "Cross Heart: Itsuwari no Nai Kimochi", featuring Tōyama (as Marie) and Ami Koshimizu (as Marie 2), served as the ending theme song starting with the fourth episode.) Crunchyroll is streaming the series. Medialink licensed the series in Southeast Asia for streaming on Ani-One Asia's YouTube channel.

==== Episodes ====
No.	Title	Directed by (Note: Production staff information is taken from the ending credits of each episode.)	Written by	Storyboarded by	Original release date
1	"Deceitful, Mysterious Marie"; Transliteration: "Uso to Himitsu ni Mamireta Marī" (Japanese: 嘘と秘密にまみれたマリー)	Sachiko Kanno	Mariko Kunisawa	Junji Nishimura	October 5, 2025
Arthur, illegitimate heir to the Zetes Corporation, receives a robot maid named Marie. Due to all the assassination attempts Arthur despises humans and only trusts emotionless objects. Unfortunately, Marie is actually a human who cannot show emotions on her face and agreed to pose as a robot and protect Arthur in exchange for enrolling at Arthur's prestigious academy. When alone with Arthur she is shocked he becomes a robot otaku with a crush on her. Fortunately, Arthur does not notice she is a real student as he assumes she is undercover. Marie encounters Arthur's step-brother Maynard, the source of most of the assassins. That evening Arthur rests his head in her lap and confirms she has legs of metal, unaware it is actually super powerful muscle from martial arts training. Maynard kidnaps Arthur but Marie chases after the speeding car. Arthur reveals he secretly recorded the kidnapping, forcing Maynard to leave or have the video leaked online. Marie arrives, beats up the remaining thugs, and convinces Arthur to escape the burning building by claiming her metal body will survive the flames. Marie passes out but awakens at Arthur's mansion, having been saved by his butler Roy. Arthur is suspicious at first, convinced he saw Marie smiling, but decides he was seeing things in the smoke. He also scolds himself for falling in love with a robot.
2	"Mistrusted Marie"; Transliteration: "Utagawareru Marī" (Japanese: 疑われるマリー)	Hidehiko Kadota	Mariko Kunisawa	Sachiko Kanno	October 12, 2025
Arthur hosts a party for influential people, hoping to please his father. Marie captures a saboteur while Arthur is pleased to see his aunt Charlotte and uncle Carl, the only relatives on his side. Charlotte appears suspicious about Marie. Marie wonders why Arthur keeps making her heart race. She catches an assassin but disturbs the party. Luckily, Arthur reassures the guests. Charlotte decides Marie is the perfect cure to Arthur's misanthropy. Maynard is furious Marie foiled him again. Arthur wonders how Marie powers herself, causing her to panic and claim she uses AA batteries, which he somehow believes. He suddenly kisses her forehead, making her flee in embarrassment. Arthur becomes suspicious so Roy decides to replace her with a real robot, the Marie 2. Marie is unexpectedly emotional at how much she will miss Arthur, but Arthur rushes after her, insisting Marie is the only robot he wants. Marie 2 detects Marie has high combat abilities and therefore a threat to Arthur, so she attacks. Marie destroys Marie 2, and Arthur claims he realised her odd behaviour was caused by her malfunctioning. He asks her to stay with him forever, and Marie realises she wants the same thing. Roy lets her stay but reveals he has had Marie 2 repaired and wants them to protect Arthur together.
3	"Unmasked Marie"; Transliteration: "Miyaburareru Marī" (Japanese: 見破られるマリー)	Tsutomu Murakami	Mariko Kunisawa	Toshizō Kida	October 19, 2025
Arthur begins buying Marie batteries as gifts. Roy insists Arthur relax, so Arthur asks Marie to activate "Girlfriend Mode" then takes her on a date. Arthur kisses her cheek, shocking her, until Maynard's next assassin attacks. Marie chases him to the roof but finds he is also an expert martial artist. The man claims to be jealous Arthur kissed Marie as he himself is enamoured of her, so he pushes her off the roof to escape. Arthur decides next time she is in Girlfriend Mode he will kiss her properly, so Marie quickly claims it consumes too much energy and cannot be activated often. The assassin, Noah, transfers to Marie's class and admits he wants to see her expressionless face twisted by fear. He also reveals he has discovered her real identity and could expose her to Arthur whenever he wants. Arthur is furious when Marie claims Noah is her new friend, so he demands they fight for her. Noah suggests catching chickens misplaced by the Zoological Club, and whoever wins keeps Marie. When only one chicken remains Marie tries to help Arthur but falls into a pond. Arthur rescues her so Noah admits Arthur deserves Marie more than he does. Later, Roy scolds Marie for almost exposing herself, and for Arthur catching a cold while rescuing her.
4	"Lovestruck Marie"; Transliteration: "Koisuru Marī" (Japanese: 恋するマリー)	Studio Bus	Kōji Miura	Shinichi Watanabe	October 26, 2025
With Arthur sick Roy gives Marie a briefcase, claiming it contains the Zetes family's secret remedy for male illness. Marie opens the case and discovers a sexy nurse uniform, which not surprisingly convinces Arthur to rest properly. Marie notices scars on his back from a past assassination attempt that still cause him pain. Assassins target Arthur while he is unwell but Marie deals with them. Arthur admits Marie is the only one he can show weakness to, making her feel guilty about lying to him. Maynard orders Noah to kidnap Arthur so he can kill him himself. Arthur recovers in time for the Academy's founding costume party. Noah poisons Arthur with a drug that causes blindness and deafness. Noah asks Marie to become an assassin so they can work together, but she refuses. In the dark she swaps places with Marie 2 and locates Arthur but Noah destroys Marie 2 and angrily points out Marie has no future with Arthur who will hate her the moment he discovers she is human. Arthur semi-wakes up and tries to protect Marie, making her realise she loves him. She knocks Noah unconscious and takes Arthur home. Noah keeps attending the academy, pointing out he will have fun watching her guilt grow as she keeps lying to Arthur now she knows she is in love with him.
5	"Jealous Marie"; Transliteration: "Shitto Suru Marī" (Japanese: 嫉妬するマリー)	Kentarō Mizuno	Junji Nishimura	Junji Nishimura	November 2, 2025
Marie makes mistakes around Arthur, having realised she is in love with him. Marie 2 suggests Marie wear sunglasses so she cannot be distracted by Arthur's face, but Arthur insists on taking them off, making her heart race. Luckily, Marie 2 claims removing the sunglasses caused a malfunction, so she rushes Marie away to "reboot". Marie believes love has made her weak, but Marie 2 points out love can be strength. Arthur apologises to Marie, who blurts out she loves him, before they are interrupted by another assassin. Angry at being interrupted, Marie beats him up and realises Marie 2 was right, love makes her stronger when protecting Arthur. Charlotte visits and Arthur begins spending time with Marie 2, making Marie jealous. Noah notices her jealousy and tries to tease her, only to be baffled when Marie suddenly admits her problems with Arthur and Marie 2. As an assassin Noah can only suggest killing Marie 2. After school Arthur sends Marie home while he visits a park. Confused, Marie runs to the park just in time to help Marie 2 defeat several assassins. Arthur reveals the time he spent with Marie 2 was due to overseeing upgrades suggested by Charlotte. Marie apologises for her jealousy, making Arthur glad she has become possessive of him, and assures her Marie 2 could never replace her.
6	"Captive Marie"; Transliteration: "Toraware no Marī" (Japanese: 囚われのマリー)	Shinji Sano	Kōji Miura	Sachiko Kanno	November 9, 2025
Marie learns it is Arthur's birthday, which Arthur hates due to the number of times assassins have poisoned the cake or sent bombs in presents. Marie decides to bake him a cake herself. At school Marie is invited to join Arthur's fan club. Marie admits she likes Arthur and is surprised this angers them, as they are certain Arthur would never actually love someone. That night she tries to make a cake and Noah tries to steal it but on seeing her terrible baking he decides not to. Marie decides to throw it away but on seeing how unhappy Arthur is she gives it to him anyway. He accepts it and feels better, despite the flavour. Assassins attack and Marie is surprised Arthur takes one down as it is supposed to be her job to protect him. The next day Marie is kidnapped by the Robot Lovers club who plan to dismantle her. Luckily Arthur rescues her and she again feels guilty for Arthur protecting her. With her bra exposed she panics and claims her memory was deleted. Arthur attempts to restore it by copying some of their past behaviours such as hugging, hand holding, the lap pillow and so on. Marie quickly claims her memory was restored so she can scold him for making things up. Privately, she did enjoy the hugging and hand holding.
7	"Martial Marie"; Transliteration: "Tatakau Marī" (Japanese: 闘うマリー)	Hidehiko Kadota	Mariko Kunisawa	Shinichi Watanabe	November 16, 2025
Arthur and Marie's school, Kalmia Academy, hosts a sports festival against Perennial Academy as both schools will soon be merging and the winning academy gets to keep their name. Marie meets Daryl from Perennial, claiming to be Arthur's oldest friend. A saboteur, under Daryl's orders, shoots an airgun at Arthur's horse, causing him to fall during the Equestrian Event and is injured. He reveals to Marie he and Daryl became friends in elementary school, but Arthur found Daryl secretly resented his looks and intelligence, sabotaging him wherever possible and paying other students to bully him. Despite this, Arthur cannot stop thinking of Daryl as a friend. Marie decides to deal with Daryl by replacing Arthur in the Piggyback Battle. Noah volunteers to be part of Marie's mount. Daryl's saboteurs in the audience shoot Marie's teammates with airguns, causing their team to lose players, and ultimately shoot Marie's mount causing her team to trip and fall. As she is about to be disqualified, Noah throws Marie back into the air toward Daryl's mount, preventing her being disqualified as she did not touch the ground. Landing on Daryl's mount, she snatches his headband, claiming victory for Kalmia. As Daryl tries to rub his and Arthur's friendship in her face, Arthur punches Daryl and reveals not only Daryl's cheating, but also shows him years of photographs he collected, proving Daryl's bullying all the way back to elementary school; he was just too ashamed to admit it until now. Arthur thanks Marie for her help. Roy is later surprised Arthur plays the piano for the first time in years, and Marie 2 comments about Arthur's playing shows his emotional state improving.
8	"Tropical Marie"; Transliteration: "Minami no Shima no Marī" (Japanese: 南の島のマリー)	Daisuke Kurose	Junji Nishimura	Junji Nishimura	November 23, 2025
Marie fails two of her classes and has to retake the exams or be expelled. Arthur decides to tutor her, as does Noah, though Marie is certain he wants her expelled so he can assassinate Arthur. Noah makes trouble by telling Arthur he knows secrets about Marie that she would never tell him. Roy and Marie 2 put Marie through a hellish study session and she just manages to pass the exams. Arthur celebrates with a trip to a tropical island. To mess with them Noah sends invitations to Charlotte and Carl and their daughter Isabel, Arthur's fan club and Maynard. Maynard unleashes Prototype-26, an early version of Marie 2, to kill Arthur. Marie 2 battles Prototype-26, causing Marie and Arthur to become trapped on a separate beach. Marie panics when her stomach growls. Luckily, Arthur interprets this as a low energy alarm but only provides her with batteries. She forages edible grass for Arthur, remembering it was how she fed herself after her father died and her mother remarried and began neglecting her. Arthur is confused by her claims of foraging grass, so she quickly claims she used to be a lawnmower. Even more confused, Arthur decides to ask Roy where Marie came from. They shelter from a sudden storm where Arthur confesses he loves her. Despite her heart racing Marie can only tell him if she were a human she would probably love him as well. They are interrupted by Marie 2 locating them. Maynard is furious Arthur survived again.
9	"Deceitful, Mysterious, Exposed Marie"; Transliteration: "Uso to Himitsu ga Bareta Marī" (Japanese: 嘘と秘密がバレたマリー)	Tsutomu Murakami	Kōji Miura	Shinichi Watanabe	November 30, 2025
Marie finds herself wishing to make friends with Arthur's fan club. Noah claims it is pointless since they are all spoiled, rich girls Marie has nothing in common with. Sure enough, Marie's attempts only anger club leader Bridget. Their homeroom teacher threatens to cancel Kalmia's Fall Festival unless the student who broke a vase confesses. Marie confesses so no one misses the fireworks. Noah finds the culprits who let Marie take the blame, beats them up and makes them confess. Bridget claims they are too different to ever be friends, but she is happy to watch the fireworks with her as a rival. Marie thanks Noah for his help just as Arthur arrives. Noah is unexpectedly angry Arthur interrupted. Roy collects all remaining evidence Marie is human and lets Marie look it over before he destroys it. One of the pages blows out a window and is picked up by Arthur, who sees pictures of Marie in high school. Unable to find anything about Marie online Arthur decides to observe Marie in person. Seeing her smiling like a human he grabs her wrist and confirms she has a heartbeat. He is devastated she lied to him but cannot believe she is a bad person. Eavesdropping, he discovers Roy was behind the deception, but when he hears Marie agree to leave if he ever learns the truth, he decides not to say anything and keep treating her like a robot.
10	"Resigned Marie"; Transliteration: "Akirameru Marī" (Japanese: 諦めるマリー)	Kentarō Mizuno	Junji Nishimura	Shinichi Watanabe	December 7, 2025
Arthur fears avoiding her might be upsetting to Marie so he decides to spend all day with her. While inspecting Destiny Park, an amusement park his family want to buy, Arthur is joined by Rusty, Charlotte and Isabel, who has begun referring to Arthur as her fiancé while she is actually engaged to Maynard. Sensing a rival, Isabel insists Marie must be a human, but Arthur manages to cover for her. Correctly deducing Marie is thirsty but cannot drink in front of him Arthur makes an excuse to leave while leaving a soda, which Marie quickly drinks. Unfortunately, she is seen drinking by Isabel who blackmails her to help her seduce Arthur. Marie starts to understand there can be no future for her and Arthur as they come from different worlds. Fed up, Arthur directly rejects Isabel, making her cry. Isabel runs into an area still under construction but Marie finds her and convinces her not to give up on Arthur since she and Arthur will never end up dating, given their strange situation. A cliff collapses, requiring Marie 2 to rescue them. Isabel admits she is actually in love with Maynard, who was kind to her when they were children until Arthur showed up, turning Maynard dark and murderous. She hoped by getting close to Arthur Maynard might pay attention to her again. Arthur apologises for making her life difficult and Isabel apologises too. That evening Arthur accidentally walks in on Marie in the shower.
11	"Forgotten Marie"; Transliteration: "Wasurerareta Marī" (Japanese: 忘れられたマリー)	Nao Yamada	Mariko Kunisawa	Gōichi Iwahata	December 14, 2025
Marie realises her secret is revealed since robots do not require showers. A cleaner locks the door, trapping them in the bathroom wearing only towels. Arthur places her in the bathwater to stay warm, accidentally revealing he knows she is human. She asks Arthur how long he has known, but Arthur thinks she is asking how long he has been in love, so he reveals he realised during the fireworks. She asks how he feels about her, which he mistakes for embarrassment over being naked, so he reassures her she is wonderful. She decides to tell him the truth and then quit her job. A sudden pain in Arthur's head makes him pass out. Marie 2 and Roy free them. Arthur is diagnosed with poisoning and awakens with amnesia, though the only thing he has forgotten is Marie. Roy hopes the antidote will return his memories, but the poisoner admits Maynard only gave him the poison, not the antidote. Roy learns Arthur found out Marie is human, so he decides to leave Arthur as he is so Marie can continue protecting him. Marie is upset Arthur has also returned to his old self: sad, isolated and suspicious of everybody, including the new friends he made at school. She decides to return his memory by taking him to all the places they have been, but his memory does not return. As a last resort, Marie goes undercover as a new employee in Maynard's mansion.
12	"Goodbye, Marie"; Transliteration: "Sayōnara Marī" (Japanese: さようならマリー)	Shinji Sano	Mariko Kunisawa	Junji Nishimura	December 21, 2025
Noah guesses Marie's plan to cure Arthur while at the mansion. Marie admits she loves Arthur and wants to stop lying to him. Maynard catches them and reveals there is no antidote. Noah is amazed when Marie starts to cry, so he reveals that he made an antidote without telling Maynard, which he gives to Marie. Isabel reveals herself and confesses she has loved Maynard all along, then beats him up for being an idiot. Noah helps Marie escape and Isabel concludes Noah must have a crush on Marie. Marie offers a suspicious Arthur the antidote, which he feels may cause everyone to split up. Disregarding his hesitation, she forces him to take it by swallowing the antidote and then kissing him with it in her mouth, then confesses she is human, that she loves him, and that she wants him to be happy. As she leaves, Arthur suddenly gets his memories back and chases her through the mansion, admitting he loves her and wants her to stay. Amazed Arthur loves her despite her many lies, Marie also decides to stay. Weeks later at a wedding party, Arthur admits he only accepted being heir to prove himself to his father, but he no longer needs it and would like Maynard to replace him with some hope they can be friends again. Noah visits the party and reveals that for betraying his employer, he is now a target for every assassin in the world, but wanted to see Marie once more before leaving. Marie and Arthur jump down from the balcony to be on time for the start, and Arthur's father attends the party to congratulate Arthur as it is revealed that the party is actually their wedding. Afterwards, Roy is exasperated Marie continues to dress as a maid despite being Arthur's wife. Marie and Arthur have fun fighting off the assassins Maynard occasionally sends after them, just to keep life interesting.
