= Eternal Boys =

Japanese anime television series

- Key visual

永久少年 (Eikyū Shōnen)
- Created by: Manpuku Geinō Production
- Manga
- Written by: Manpuku Geinō Production
- Illustrated by: Chansana
- Published by: Media Factory
- Magazine: Monthly Comic Gene
- Original run: April 15, 2022 – July 14, 2023
- Volumes: 2
- Anime television series
- Directed by: migmi
- Written by: Kimiko Ueno
- Music by: Yukari Hashimoto
- Studio: Liden Films
- Licensed by: Sentai Filmworks
- Original network: Fuji TV, BS Fuji
- Original run: October 11, 2022 – March 28, 2023
- Episodes: 24
- Anime film

Eternal Boys NEXT STAGE
- Directed by: migmi
- Studio: Liden Films
- Licensed by: Sentai Filmworks
- Released: June 9, 2023
- Runtime: 69 minutes
- Video game

Eikyū Shōnen Side Project: Twilight na Spica
- Developer: Coly
- Genre: Otome
- Platform: iOS Android
- Released: JP: April 28, 2023

Eternal Boys (永久少年, Eikyū Shōnen) is an original Japanese anime television series animated by Liden Films, directed by migimi and written by Kimiko Ueno, with the original concept credited to the real-life Manpuku Geinō Production. The series aired from October 2022 to March 2023 on Fuji TV. A manga adaptation by Chansana was serialized in Media Factory's shōjo manga magazine Monthly Comic Gene from April 2022 to July 2023.

== Characters ==
Kentarō Sanada (真田健太郎, Sanada Kentarō)
Voiced by: Daisuke Hirakawa
Naoki Ishida (石田直樹, Ishida Naoki)
Voiced by: Katsuyuki Konishi
Haru Asai (浅井 悠, Asai Haru)
Voiced by: Jun Fukuyama
Tsuyoshi Imagawa (今川 剛, Imagawa Tsuyoshi)
Voiced by: Daisuke Namikawa
Daisuke Yamanaka (山中大輔, Yamanaka Daisuke)
Voiced by: Toshiyuki Morikawa
Makoto Kakizaki (柿崎 誠, Kakizaki Makoto)
Voiced by: Nozomu Sasaki
Fukuko Manda (満田福子, Manda Fukuko)
Voiced by: Yūko Noichi
Pepechan (ぺぺちゃん)
Voiced by: Haruka Chisuga
Ren Ukita (宇喜多蓮, Ukita Ren)
Voiced by: Yumiri Hanamori
Nicolai Asakura (ニコライ朝倉, Nikorai Asakura)
Voiced by: Hiroki Tōchi

=== Gentlemen ===
Sawao Soda (爽田佐和緒, Soda Sawao)
Voiced by: Showtaro Morikubo
Etsurō Aizome (藍染悦郎, Aizome Etsurō)
Voiced by: Takuma Terashima
Ui Hakosaka (葉小坂初, Hakosaka Ui)
Voiced by: KENN
Renji Ii (井伊蓮司, Ii Renji)
Voiced by: Jun Kasama

=== Story of Love ===
Soki Azuma (吾妻創輝, Azuma Sōki)
Voiced by: Chiaki Kobayashi
Kento Takanashi (小鳥遊賢人, Takanashi Kento)
Voiced by: Shugo Nakamura
Nobunaga Odagiri (小田桐信長, Odagiri Nobunaga)
Voiced by: Keisuke Koumoto
Junjie Lin (リン・ジュンジェ, Rin Junje)
Voiced by: Arthur Lounsbery
Chika Higashijujo (東十条知架, Higashijūjō Chika)
Voiced by: Haruki Ishiya
Sakura Kagurazaka (神楽坂咲楽, Kagurazaka Sakura)
Voiced by: Shun Horie

== Media ==
=== Manga ===
A manga adaptation with art by Chansana was serialized in Media Factory's shōjo manga magazine Monthly Comic Gene from April 15, 2022, to July 14, 2023. A single volume has been released as of November 2022. The second and last volume was released on July 27, 2023.

=== Anime ===
The original anime television series was announced on March 16, 2022. The series is animated by Liden Films and directed by migimi, with scripts written by Kimiko Ueno and the original concept credited to the real-life Manpuku Geinō Production. Original character designs are provided by ma2, while Seiko Asai adapts the designs for animation. The music is composed by Yukari Hashimoto, and the sound is directed by Ryō Tanaka. It aired from October 11, 2022, to March 28, 2023, on Fuji TV. The opening theme song is "Dreamy Life" by Gentlemen, while the ending theme song is "Friends" by Story of Love. Sentai Filmworks licensed the series, and began streaming it on Hidive on March 19, 2023.

=== Film continuation ===
A new episode titled Eternal Boys Next Stage was announced on March 22, 2023 It premiered in Japanese theaters on June 9, 2023, as a 69-minute film. The opening is "Red Line" sung by Eternal Boys and the movie ending was sung by Story of Life "PERFECT WORLD".

=== Game ===
An otome game developed by Coly titled Eikyū Shōnen Side Project: Twilight na Spica (永久少年Side Project -トワイライトなスピカ-) was released in April 2023.
