= Bartender (manga) =

Japanese manga series

- First volume cover

バーテンダー (Bātendā)
- Genre: Drama; Iyashikei
- Manga
- Written by: Araki Joh
- Illustrated by: Kenji Nagatomo
- Published by: Shueisha
- Magazine: Super Jump (2004–2011); Grand Jump (2011)
- Original run: May 2004 – December 2011
- Volumes: 21
- Anime television series
- Directed by: Masaki Watanabe
- Written by: Yasuhiro Imagawa
- Music by: Kaoruko Ōtake
- Studio: Palm Studio
- Licensed by: BI/NA: Anime Limited
- Original network: Fuji TV
- Original run: October 15, 2006 – December 31, 2006
- Episodes: 11
- Television drama
- Directed by: Osamu Katayama
- Written by: Natsuko Takahashi
- Original network: TV Asahi
- Original run: February 4, 2011 – April 1, 2011
- Episodes: 8
- Manga

Bartender à Paris
- Written by: Araki Joh
- Illustrated by: Osamu Kajisa
- Published by: Shueisha
- Magazine: Grand Jump
- Original run: January 4, 2012 – October 2, 2013
- Volumes: 6
- Manga

Bartender à Tokyo
- Written by: Araki Joh
- Illustrated by: Osamu Kajisa
- Published by: Shueisha
- Magazine: Grand Jump (2013–2015); Grand Jump Premium (2015–2016)
- Original run: November 6, 2013 – August 17, 2016
- Volumes: 8
- Manga

Bartender 6stp
- Written by: Araki Joh
- Illustrated by: Osamu Kajisa
- Published by: Shueisha
- Magazine: Grand Jump Premium (2016–2018); Grand Jump Mucha (2018–2019)
- Original run: August 24, 2016 – December 25, 2019
- Volumes: 4
- Anime television series

Bartender: Glass of God
- Directed by: Ryōichi Kuraya
- Written by: Mariko Kunisawa
- Music by: Hiroaki Tsutsumi
- Studio: Liber
- Licensed by: Crunchyroll; SEA: Medialink
- Original network: TV Tokyo
- Original run: April 4, 2024 – June 20, 2024
- Episodes: 12
- icon

Bartender (Japanese: バーテンダー, Hepburn: Bātendā) is a Japanese manga series written by Araki Joh and illustrated by Kenji Nagatomo. Its focus is Ryū Sasakura, a genius bartender who uses his talents to ease the worries and soothe the souls of troubled customers. The manga was first serialized in Shueisha's Japanese seinen manga magazine Super Jump from 2004 to 2011. The individual chapters were collected by Shueisha and released in twenty-one tankōbon volumes.

Bartender was later adapted into an anime television series by Palm Studio, broadcast in 2006 on Fuji TV. The manga was also adapted into a Japanese television drama in 2011 that aired on TV Asahi. Three spin-off manga (Bartender à Paris, Bartender à Tokyo, and Bartender 6stp) have been serialized in Grand Jump and Grand Jump Premium between 2012 and 2019. In Japan, Bartender has sold over 2.8 million copies, while it received a mixed reception from English-language manga and anime publications.

A 12-episode reboot anime television series produced by Liber, titled Bartender: Glass of God, aired on TV Tokyo from April to June 2024.

== Plot ==
Bartender follows the nightlife of Ryū Sasakura (佐々倉 溜, Sasakura Ryū) (voiced by Takahiro Mizushima in the anime and played by Masaki Aiba in the drama), a bartending prodigy who is said to mix the best cocktails anyone has ever tasted. Upon returning from his studies in France, Ryū works as an assistant for a senior bartender at the bar Lapin. He later opened his own bar, the Eden Hall (イーデンホール, Īden Hōru), which is hidden in a nook of the Ginza district in downtown Tokyo. Rumor holds that potential patrons cannot simply find and enter Eden Hall; rather they must be invited in by the host. Sasakura is known to serve the "Glass of the Gods" (神のグラス, Kami no Gurasu), a way of saying that he knows just the right drink to serve in a particular situation.

The only other regular character is Miwa Kurushima (来島 美和, Kurushima Miwa) (voiced by Ayumi Fujimura in the anime and played by Shihori Kanjiya in the drama), the granddaughter of the owner of the Hotel Cardinal, Taizo Kurushima (来島 泰三, Kurushima Taizō). She is the office lady of the company and requires him to compete for the job of bartender in the hotel. Ryū is initially rejected by Kamishima (神嶋), the manager of the hotel beverage department. However, upon Miwa's insistence, Taizo meets Ryū and becomes fascinated by his abilities, requesting her to insist on Ryū to bring him to work in the hotel.

Over the course of the manga, various other figures, all of whom share unusual troubles and heavy burdens, are invited into Eden Hall and are treated to Sasakura's fine drinks, which, with guidance from the young bartender, lead the customers to reflect upon their lives and decide on a course of action to tackle their problems.

== Themes ==
Bartender is predominantly an episodic series, and although the clients and problems vary, each story revolves around problems being resolved through the right drink. Alcohol is not depicted as a potential problem that might have negative effects such as drunkenness in the series; instead, "Bartender insists the right drink at the right time ... is about starting an earnest conversation with oneself." To know which beverage is the most appropriate, according to the series, a bartender must be more than a liquor connoisseur; he or she must be a good observer. For example, Ryū can deduce one's feelings by looking at one's hands and can know if someone is telling the truth or not. As such, it is not just about drinking; "the stories of the customers are sometimes, if not almost always, as important as and at times even parallel to the history of the liquors imbibed."

== Media ==
=== Manga ===
The Bartender manga was written by Araki Joh, illustrated by Kenji Nagatomo, and serialized in Shueisha's biweekly seinen manga Super Jump between May 2004 and September 2011. With Super Jump's cancellation, the series moved to the then–new Grand Jump, in which Bartender was serialized during November and December 2011. Its chapters were eventually collected into twenty-one volumes, with the first volume released on December 3, 2004, and the final volume on February 17, 2012. An "Encounter Edition" (出会い編, Deai-hen), which follows Ryū's return from Paris, was released into four parts, with the first two volumes released on September 18, 2014 and the last two volumes on October 17, 2014.

The series was completely published by Haksan Publishing in South Korea, and by Sharp Point Press in Taiwan.

==== Spin-offs ====
A spin-off series titled Bartender à Paris, with a new protagonist, Ren Sajima (佐島 蓮, Sajima Ren), began in Grand Jump on January 4, 2012; Nagatomo was replaced by Osamu Kajisa for the series. The series finished on October 2, 2013. It was collected into six volumes; the first was published on June 19, 2012, and the last on December 19, 2013.

A follow-up, Bartender à Tokyo, began in the same magazine on November 6, 2013, and was later moved to Grand Jump Premium on December 24, 2015. The series finished on August 17, 2016. It was collected into eight volumes; the first was released on April 18, 2014, and the last on October 19, 2016.

The fourth and last installment of the series, Bartender 6stp, was serialized on Grand Jump Premium and Grand Jump Mucha from August 24, 2016, to December 25, 2019. The 6stp's first volume was published on March 17, 2017, and the last—the fourth volume—was released on February 19, 2020.

Both Bartender à Paris and Bartender à Tokyo were licensed in South Korea by Haksan Publishing and in Taiwan by Sharp Point Press.

=== Anime ===
Bartender was adapted into an 11-episode anime series, directed by Masaki Watanabe, written by Yasuhiro Imagawa, and produced by Palm Studio. The anime uses New Wave film methods, including breaking the fourth wall, "stagy narration, [and] odd transitions". It also explores staging techniques, such as monologues, spotlights, and half-screens showing storyteller and narrated story at the same time. It aired on Fuji TV from October 15 to December 31, 2006. Pony Canyon compiled the series and released it on five separate DVDs between December 20, 2006, and April 18, 2007. Anime Limited announced at MCM London Comic Con 2018 that they had acquired the series for release in the United Kingdom and Ireland. Two years later, Anime Limited announced the license for Northern America and a partnership with Shout! Factory to release the series. It was released both digitally and on a two-disc Blu-ray set on January 19, 2021, in the United Kingdom, Ireland, the United States and Canada.

The music for Bartender was composed by Kaoruko Ōtake, and subsequently released on an official soundtrack album on November 29, 2006, produced by Sony Music Japan under the DefStar Records label. The opening theme song "Bartender", and the ending theme song, "Hajimari no Hito" (始まりのヒト), were both performed by Natural High, with the opening theme featuring Junpei Shiina. Both themes were released by Sony as the single "Hajimari no Hito/Bartender" on December 13, 2006.

A new anime project was announced in October 2022. It was later revealed to be a reboot television series, titled Bartender: Glass of God (バーテンダー 神のグラス, Bātendā: Kami no Gurasu), produced by Liber and directed by Ryōichi Kuraya, with Mariko Kunisawa writing the scripts, Yōichi Ueda designing the characters and serving as chief animation director, and Hiroaki Tsutsumi serving as music composer. The series aired for twelve episodes from April 4 to June 20, 2024, on TV Tokyo. (Note: TV Tokyo lists the 2024 anime series premiere on April 3 at 24:00, which is effectively April 4 at midnight JST.) The opening theme song is "Stardust Memory", performed by Takaya Kawasaki, while the ending theme song is "Spica", performed by Mone Kamishiraishi. Crunchyroll streamed the series. An English dub premiered on the platform on July 25, 2024. Medialink licensed the series in Southeast Asia and Oceania (except Australia and New Zealand) and streams it on its Ani-One Asia YouTube channel.

=== Drama ===
In November 2010, through the 24th issue of Super Jump, it was announced that a live-action Japanese television drama of Bartender would be produced, starring Masaki Aiba, who had been training with a professional bartender since September of that year, and Shihori Kanjiya. Directed by Osamu Katayama and written by Natsuko Takahashi, the new series aired on TV Asahi's "Friday Night Drama" time slot from February 4, 2011, to April 1, 2011. The series theme song, "Lotus", was performed by Arashi, a boy band of which Aiba is a member. On August 5, 2011, during an event at the Tokyo Tower, TC Entertainment released all episodes of the Bartender drama in DVD and Blu-ray box sets. Several tie-in products were also released, including straps, cups, pens, and candles. Prior to the drama's premiere, Aiba made a surprise appearance in special Masaki Aiba's Bartending Mission on January 14, 2011, where he served as a bartender at celebrity drinking parties.

== Reception ==
Bartender had sold more than 2.8 million copies in Japan as of January 2011; individual volumes frequently appeared on lists of best-selling manga in that country. The anime television series finale obtained a 3.4 percent television viewership rating, making it the fourth most–watched anime–related program that week. The television drama debut had an 11 percent television viewership rating, while its finale earned an 11.7 rating. Its DVD box set sold 7,978 copies, considered a "successful" number by TV Asahi, and its related merchandise also "sold well." At Nikkan Sports Drama Grand Prix, Bartender was voted the fourth–best drama, and Masaki the third–best actor in a drama. The television series also received coverage from the Nippon Bartenders Association.

David Welsh, in The Manga Curmudgeon, declared the way Ryu used liquor to help other people "a beautiful, uplifting message for a comic. Okay, maybe not, but it sounds like a lot of fun." At Ani-Gamers, a reviewer known as "Ink" wrote that the series unduly "romanticizes" a bar, but praised its storytelling and staging techniques, the narration, its "casual dialog and effective visuals", and its balance. He described it as "a love letter to liquor as opposed to the consumption thereof," while Bamboo Dong of Anime News Network (ANN) called it "a delicious ode to mixology". Michael Toole, also for ANN, wrote that although it is "pretty cheesy ... there is something deeply, compulsively watchable about Bartender in spite of its plainness. It's gentle and sentimental, with powerful and surprising transitions."

Writing for THEM Anime Reviews, Tim Jones called it "an interesting concept for an anime." Jones asserted that the animation was not "all that stellar", but commented that the drinks in CG "look quite good." He found the character designs "fairly generic" except for Ryū, and the music "a little repetitive" over the 11 episodes, although he stressed that it "fits the atmosphere of the show." On the other hand, ANN's Carl Kimlinger criticized Bartender's concept "as insipid, silly, and downright awful" and "monumentally uninspired". He praised its animation but said "no stylistic elaboration on earth can save it from boring its audience to tears". Erin Finnegan from the same site dubbed its graphics "craptastic" and called the idea of solving individuals' problems through drinks "cheesy." Erica Hennessy of CBR praised the anime series for its iyashikei warmth, noting its positive portrayal of alcohol, strong writing, and focus on healing.
