= Araki Joh =

Japanese manga artist

Araki Joh (Japanese: 城アラキ, Hepburn: Jō Araki) is a Japanese manga artist. He is most known for his work with Kenji Nagatomo on Bartender, and its sequels Bartender à Paris and Bartender à Tokyo. He has also written among others, Sommelier, along with Shinobu Kaitani, La Sommelière, with Katsunori Matsui, and Oui Chef!, with Hiyoko Kobayashi.
