= Shiori Izawa =

Japanese voice actress

- 井澤 詩織
- Born: February 1, 1987 (age 39); Saitama Prefecture, Japan
- Occupation: Voice actress
- Years active: 2006–present
- Agent: Voice Kit
- Notable work: The Asterisk War as Saya Sasamiya; Made in Abyss as Nanachi; Edens Zero as E.M. Pino; Don't Toy with Me, Miss Nagatoro as Sakura; Chainsaw Man as Pochita
- Height: 155 cm (5 ft 1 in)

Shiori Izawa (井澤 詩織, Izawa Shiori; born February 1, 1987) is a Japanese voice actress from Saitama Prefecture.

== Filmography ==
=== Anime television ===
- Hell Girl: Three Vessels (2008–2009), Tsubaki
- Durarara!! (2010), Shiri
- Princess Jellyfish (2010), Gocchan
- Maji de Watashi ni Koi Shinasai! (2011), Saki Mimori
- Bloody Bunny (2012), Bloody Bunny
- Fairy Tail (2012), Mary Hughes
- Girls und Panzer (2012), Midoriko Sono, Moyoko Gotō, Nozomi Konparu
- Inu X Boku Secret Service (2012), Murai
- La storia della Arcana Famiglia (2012), Donatella, Fukurota
- Nakaimo - My Sister Is Among Them! (2012), Shogo Mikadono (young)
- Sword Art Online (2012), Argo, Pina
- Tsuritama (2012), Emi Itō, Yumi Itō
- Day Break Illusion (2013), Schrödinger
- Karneval (2013), Rissun
- Log Horizon (2013–2014), Kawara
- Silver Spoon (2013), Mayumi Yoshino
- Sword Art Online: Extra Edition (2013), Pina
- WataMote (2013), Alice
- Hero Bank (2014), Mashiro Kyōshī
- Hi-sCoool! SeHa Girls (2014), Mega Drive
- Hozuki's Coolheadedness (2014), Yashajirō
- Locodol (2014), Shōko Noda
- Monster Retsuden Oreca Battle (2014), Poochy Dragon, Red Dragon, Scarlet Dragon
- Noragami (2014), Moyu
- Sabagebu! (2014), Student Council Vice President
- Samurai Flamenco (2014), Hekiru's Niece
- Sword Art Online II (2014), Pina
- Witch Craft Works (2014), Tanpopo Kuraishi
- Log Horizon 2 (2014–2015), Kawara
- Shirobako (2014–2015), Ai Kunogi
- Durarara!!×2 Shō (2015), Kiyomin
- Gangsta. (2015), Sig
- Go! Princess PreCure (2015), Stop
- Senki Zesshō Symphogear GX (2015), Micha Jawkan (eps. 1 - 8)
- Tantei Kageki Milky Holmes TD (2015), Decrescendo
- The Asterisk War (2015), Saya Sasamiya
- Tribe Cool Crew (2015), Moe
- Durarara!!×2 Ketsu (2016), Kiyomin
- The Asterisk War Season 2 (2016), Saya Sasamiya
- Undefeated Bahamut Chronicle (2016), Tillfur Lilmit
- Taboo Tattoo (2016), Iltutmish
- Digimon Universe: Appli Monsters (2016), Mienumon
- Scorching Ping Pong Girls (2016), Kururi Futamaru
- Scum's Wish (2017), Noriko Kamomebata
- Seiren (2017), Miu Hiyama
- Mahojin Guru Guru 3rd (2017), Kebesubesu (ep. 6, 15)
- Made in Abyss (2017), Nanachi
- Citrus (2018), Matsuri Mizusawa
- The Seven Heavenly Virtues (2018), Sandalphon
- Planet With (2018), Ginko Kuroi
- Mr. Tonegawa: Middle Management Blues (2018), Zawa Voice (007)
- GeGeGe no Kitarō 6th series (2018), Carmilla
- Uchi no Maid ga Uzasugiru! (2018), Yui Morikawa
- A Certain Magical Index III (2018), Gokusai Kaibi (Girl in The Dress)
- Fruits Basket (2019), Delinquent Trio
- How Clumsy you are, Miss Ueno (2019), Tamon
- Girly Air Force (2019), Phantom
- Demon Slayer: Kimetsu no Yaiba (2019), Kanata Ubuyashiki
- Welcome to Demon School! Iruma-kun (2019), Dosanko
- Yubisaki kara no Honki no Netsujō: Osananajimi wa Shōbōshi (2019), Ayako Shinoda
- If It's for My Daughter, I'd Even Defeat a Demon Lord (2019), Vint
- XL Jо̄shi (2019), Saki Watase
- Cautious Hero: The Hero Is Overpowered but Overly Cautious (2019), Adenela
- Keep Your Hands Off Eizouken! (2020), Robot Club Seki
- Infinite Dendrogram (2020), Cheshire
- Nekopara (2020), Azuki
- A Certain Scientific Railgun T (2020), Gokusai Kaibi (Girl in The Dress)
- Interspecies Reviewers (2020), Piltia
- The House Spirit Tatami-chan (2020), Tatami-chan
- Log Horizon: Destruction of the Round Table (2021), Huadiao
- Dragon Goes House-Hunting (2021), Pip
- Full Dive (2021), Mizarisa
- Blue Reflection Ray (2021), Shino Mizusaki
- Edens Zero (2021), E.M. Pino
- Don't Toy with Me, Miss Nagatoro (2021), Sakura
- Rumble Garanndoll (2021), Misa Kuroki
- The Strongest Sage With the Weakest Crest (2022), Iris
- Hairpin Double (2022), Green/Ellie Yokosuka
- Shadowverse Flame (2022), Dragnir
- Made in Abyss: The Golden City of the Scorching Sun (2022), Nanachi
- Harem in the Labyrinth of Another World (2022), Sherry
- Peter Grill and the Philosopher's Time: Super Extra (2022), Mithlim Nezarant
- Chainsaw Man (2022), Pochita
- Love Flops (2022), Raburin
- Mobile Suit Gundam: The Witch from Mercury (2022), Sophie Pulone
- Don't Toy with Me, Miss Nagatoro 2nd Attack (2023), Sakura
- Handyman Saitō in Another World (2023), Primas
- Helck (2023), Piwi
- Reborn as a Vending Machine, I Now Wander the Dungeon (2023), Suko
- A Playthrough of a Certain Dude's VRMMO Life (2023), Ryū-chan
- The Diary of Ochibi-san (2023), Pankui
- Highspeed Etoile (2024), Towa Komachi
- Brave Bang Bravern! (2024), Akira Mishima
- The Do-Over Damsel Conquers the Dragon Emperor (2024), Rave
- The Beginning After the End (2025), Sylvia
- Umamusume: Cinderella Gray (2025), Mini the Lady
- Backstabbed in a Backwater Dungeon (2025), Aoyuki
- The Other World's Books Depend on the Bean Counter (2026), Selio
- Chained Soldier 2 (2026), Tobera Azuma
- Kaya-chan Isn't Scary (2026), Chihiro-sensei
- Rooster Fighter (2026), Piyoko
- Chainsmoker Cat (2026), Al Neko
- Kamui: He's Behind You (2026), Inagawa
- Reincarnated as a Sword II (2026), Stephan

=== Films ===
- Girls und Panzer der Film (2015), Midoriko Sono, Moyoko Gotō, Nozomi Konparu
- Pop In Q (2016), Aoi Hioka
- Girls und Panzer das Finale: Part 1 (2017), Midoriko Sono, Moyoko Gotō, Nozomi Konparu
- Girls und Panzer das Finale: Part 2 (2019), Midoriko Sono, Moyoko Gotō, Nozomi Konparu
- Girls und Panzer das Finale: Part 3 (2021), Midoriko Sono, Moyoko Gotō, Nozomi Konparu
- Sword Art Online Progressive: Scherzo of Deep Night (2022), Argo
- Chainsaw Man – The Movie: Reze Arc (2025), Pochita
- Made in Abyss: Mezameru Shinpi (2026), Nanachi

=== Video games ===
- Caladrius (2013), Maria Therese Bloomfield
- Code of Joker (2013), Saya Kyōgokuin
- Ginga Force (2013), Tini Memoril
- Caladrius Blaze (2014), Maria Therese Bloomfield
- Grimoire: Watashi-tachi Grimoire Mahō Gakuen (2014), Rina Yonamine
- Tokyo 7th Sisters (2014), Momoka Serizawa
- Idol Incidents (2015), Monika Chibana
- Senran Kagura Estival Versus (2015), Kafuru
- Superdimension Neptune VS Sega Hard Girls (2015), Mega Drive
- Icchibanketsu Online (2016), Princess Iwanaga
- A.W.: Phoenix Festa (2016), Saya Sasamiya
- Traumaster Infinity (2016), Rin Ikenobo
- Trickster: Shōkansamurai ni Naritai (2016), Nanna
- X-world (2016), Minerva
- Onmyōji (2017), Yōtō-hime
- Fate/Grand Order (2017), Assassin of the Nightless City/Wu Zetian
- Miitopia (2017), Great Sage
- Honkai Impact 3 (2017), Higokumaru
- Caravan Stories (2017), Myarol
- Houkai Gakuen 2 (2018), Yssring Leavtruth
- Alice Gear Aegis (2018), Rin Himukai
- Ragnarok M: Eternal Guardians of Love (2018), Ariel
- Girls und Panzer: Dream Tank Match (2018), Moyoko Gotō, Nozomi Konparu, Midoriko Sono
- 100% Orange Juice! (2019), Mio
- Azur Lane (2020), SN Tashkent, IJN Hakuhou
- Marco & The Galaxy Dragon (2020), Marco
- Magia Record: Puella Magi Madoka Magica Side Story (2020), Lapine
- Ash Arms (2020), M10 Tank Destroyer
- Genshin Impact (2020), Diona
- Loopers (2021), Leona
- Alchemy Stars (2021), Irridon
- Senjin Aleste (2021), Tanya Taezakura
- Soul Hackers 2 (2022), Ash
- Trinity Trigger (2022), Rye
- Blue Archive (2022), Moe Kazekura
- Two Jong Cell!! (2022), Zekko Minegami
- Girls' Frontline (2023), Sterling
- Tevi (2023), Voodoo
- Ex Astris (2024), Manganese
- Wuthering Waves (2024), Abby
- Arknights: Endfield (2026), Purrchena

=== Dubbing ===
==== Live-action ====
- The Monkey King 3, Qiushui (Xinlin He)
- Ocean's 8, Veronica (Nathanya Alexander)

==== Animation ====
- PAW Patrol - Skye (Nickelodeon)
- PAW Patrol: The Movie - Skye
- The Haunted House - Shinbi (Tooniverse)
- Kiff - Kiff Chatterley
