= Don't Toy with Me, Miss Nagatoro =

Japanese manga series and its adaptation(s)

- First tankōbon volume cover, featuring Hayase Nagatoro

イジらないで、長瀞さん (Ijiranaide, Nagatoro-san)
- Genre: Romantic comedy
- Manga
- Written by: Nanashi
- Published by: Kodansha
- English publisher: NA: Kodansha USA
- Imprint: Shōnen Magazine Comics
- Magazine: Magazine Pocket
- Original run: November 1, 2017 – July 23, 2024
- Volumes: 20
- Anime television series
- Directed by: Hirokazu Hanai
- Produced by: Hiroshi Kamei; Yutaka Suwa; Takuma Kishida; Daichi Sasa
- Written by: Taku Kishimoto
- Music by: Gin (Busted Rose)
- Studio: Telecom Animation Film
- Licensed by: Crunchyroll; SEA: Medialink
- Original network: Tokyo MX, BS11, MBS, AT-X
- Original run: April 11, 2021 – June 27, 2021
- Episodes: 12
- Anime television series

Don't Toy with Me, Miss Nagatoro 2nd Attack
- Directed by: Shinji Ushiro
- Produced by: Hiroshi Kamei; Yutaka Suwa; Takuma Kishida; Takahio Kouda; Miho Matori; Akira Nagai
- Written by: Taku Kishimoto
- Music by: Gin (Busted Rose)
- Studio: OLM Team Inoue
- Licensed by: Crunchyroll; SEA: Medialink
- Original network: Tokyo MX, BS11, MBS, AT-X
- Original run: January 8, 2023 – March 26, 2023
- Episodes: 12
- icon

Don't Toy with Me, Miss Nagatoro (Japanese: イジらないで、長瀞さん, Hepburn: Ijiranaide, Nagatoro-san) is a Japanese web manga series written and illustrated by Nanashi, also known as 774, about a high-schooler and art club member who is frequently annoyed by his junior Nagatoro, unaware of her real feelings for him. The web manga ran in Magazine Pocket, an online and app-based web manga magazine published by Kodansha, from November 2017 to July 2024. An anime television series adaptation produced by Telecom Animation Film aired from April to June 2021. A second season produced by OLM aired from January to March 2023.

== Plot ==
Naoto Hachiouji, an introverted second-year student at Kazehaya High School, prefers to avoid social interactions and draw manga in his spare time. However, first-year girl Hayase Nagatoro inadvertently discovers the manga, calls him her "Senpai", and teases him to the point of crying. She starts frequenting the art club room where he hangs out, and continues to bully him for his timid personality and otaku interests, sometimes in a sexually suggestive fashion. Initially, Senpai does not like Nagatoro at all, and desperately tries to stay as far away from her antics as possible. As she continues to push him to become more assertive, he slowly realizes he is falling in love with her, and gradually comes out of his shell and involves himself in her life.

Senpai meets Nagatoro's friends—Gamo, Yoshi and Sakura—who at first appear to be cruel and shallow high school girls who only seek to torment Senpai, but they catch on to Senpai and Nagatoro's obvious mutual crush and become supportive friends who scheme to bring the two closer together. The art club's semi-retired president Sana Sunomiya appears and tries to shut down the club, but after a contest between her and Senpai during the culture festival, she allows it to continue. During the next school year, the president's younger cousin Hana Sunomiya joins the art club, whereas Nagatoro joins the judo club. Hana understands what is happening between Senpai and Nagatoro, and makes it her mission to help them.

Nagatoro takes part in a judo tournament and makes Senpai promise that if she defeats her rival, Orihara, he will give her a kiss. Senpai thinks she is teasing him, but she insists she is being serious. So, Senpai makes a promise of his own: if he scores first at his mock university entrance exam, he will confess to Nagatoro. In the cram school, Senpai's schoolmate, Machida, is jealous of Senpai and Nagatoro's relationship and makes a bet with him: whoever scores lower at the exam will have to pose nude for the other. Sometime later, Senpai takes his exam and goes to the tournament to cheer for Nagatoro, who manages to defeat Orihara. Despite failing to score first at the exam, Senpai confesses to Nagatoro anyway, and they officially become a couple. Not long after, they share their promised kiss.

However, Machida, having lost her bet with Senpai, poses nude for him in his art class. Nagatoro later asks Senpai what he drew, and he lies that it was nothing important. Suspicious, Nagatoro takes a look at his drawing of Machida, and Senpai scolds her for looking without permission. The next day, Nagatoro starts avoiding Senpai and breaks down crying while telling her friends what happened. Senpai rushes to her home to apologize, and after he promises to never lie to her again, the two reconcile.

After the rest of the year goes by without problems, Senpai graduates from the school and moves to Tokyo, though he returns to celebrate Nagatoro's birthday. After learning of her plans to move to Tokyo once she graduates, Senpai proposes she move in with him, which she accepts.

== Characters ==
Hayase Nagatoro (長瀞 早瀬, Nagatoro Hayase) / Miss Nagatoro (長瀞さん, Nagatoro-san)
Voiced by: Sumire Uesaka (Japanese); Kimberley Anne Campbell (English)
A first-year high school girl who enjoys teasing Senpai. Although it initially appears that she just wants to torture him, she later develops genuine feelings for him, and becomes very hostile toward anyone else who tries to bully Senpai.^{Ch. 11} Her friends call her Hayacchi (ハヤっち),^{Ch. 11} and her given name is not revealed until chapter 62. She is a supporting member of the swimming club,^{Ch. 23} and supports other school sports clubs on request. She enjoys performing mixed martial arts moves, and joins the judo club in her second year.^{Ch. 82} Eventually, Senpai confesses to her, and they officially become a couple.^{Ch. 144} Her surname comes from Nagatoro Station..
Naoto Hachiouji (八王子 直人, Hachiōji Naoto) / Senpai (センパイ)
Voiced by: Daiki Yamashita (Japanese); Erik Scott Kimerer (English)
A timid introvert who likes to draw and tries to avoid social interaction. Initially, he does not like Nagatoro at all, and tries in vain to avoid her. But once he starts to spend time with her and her friends, he progressively gains self-confidence and starts to fall in love with her. His first name was revealed in Side Story 5,^{Vol. 5} although a few of his male friends call him Nao-kun (直くん),^{Ch. 74-76}. His last name "Hachiouji" (八王子, Hachiōji) was not revealed until the next school year when Sunomiya joins the art club.^{Ch. 83} Despite this, Nagatoro continues to call Naoto "Senpai". Later on, he realizes that he has developed feelings for Nagatoro. Eventually, he confesses to Nagatoro, and they officially become a couple.^{Ch. 144} His surname comes from Hachiōji Station.
Gamo (ガモちゃん, Gamo-chan)
Voiced by: Mikako Komatsu (Japanese); Brittany Cox (English)
One of Nagatoro's friends. She has orange hair in the anime series. She is the most mature among her peers and, despite her tough appearance, often acts as a big sister toward them. She likes to call Senpai "Paisen" (パイセン) but when she teases him, Nagatoro gets jealous and tells her to stop.^{Ch.16, 19} Her family runs a mixed martial arts gym.^{Ch. 76-77} The Volume 10 extra shows a fighting game profile with her English name as Maki Gamou.^{Vol. 10} Her surname comes from Gamō Station.
Yosshii (ヨッシー, Yosshī; anime: Yoshi)
Voiced by: Aina Suzuki (Japanese); Lily Ki (English)
One of Nagatoro's friends with light hair styled in twin tails and an ahoge. She typically follows Gamo around and goes along with whatever schemes she has in mind. She is described as "a bit of an airhead".^{Vol. 5 profiles} Much of her speech is repeating what Gamo says.
Sakura (桜)
Voiced by: Shiori Izawa (Japanese); Kimberly Woods (English)
One of Nagatoro's friends with a tan complexion and short blonde hair, showing up briefly at the start of the series; she is more prominent in chapter 27 onward. Her personality on the surface is sweet and quite relaxed, but she enjoys sowing jealousy in groups of boys to compete for her attention, often speaking about stringing along several guys at once for amusement.^{Ch. 32}
Sana Sunomiya (須ノ宮 さな, Sunomiya Sana) / President (部長, Buchō)
Voiced by: Nana Mizuki (Japanese); Justine Lee (English)
A third-year student who heads the art club. She has long hair that frames her face with crimson eyes, and a busty chest. She has a stern and serious personality, but also has no inhibitions with exposing her body for the sake of her art, which has won prizes.^{Ch. 37-40} She also bears a resemblance to a female character in one of Senpai's manga. She dislikes that the club has become a hangout for Nagatoro and her friends, and threatens to shut it down with a challenge at the school festival. However, when her painting is disqualified, she concedes the challenge, withdraws her request, and dresses up as a bunny girl as a punishment by Nagatoro's friends. She later supports Senpai to get along with Nagatoro. A running gag in later chapters is that she often shows up at random locations naked or going commando. She is accepted to the Tokyo University of the Arts.^{Ch. 76} Her given name is not mentioned until chapter 84 when her younger cousin calls her Sana-nēsan (さな姉さん),^{Ch. 84, 88} and her surname is confirmed to be Sunomiya in Chapter 118.^{Ch. 118}
Misaki Nagatoro (長瀞 岬, Nagatoro Misaki)
Voiced by: Yoshino Nanjō (Japanese); Vivian Lu (English)
Affectionately referred to as "Big Sis-toro" (姉瀞, Ane Toro), she is Nagatoro's older sister and a university student who greatly cares for and loves to spoil her little sister, but also likes to tease her, and often embarrasses her. She was shown to be a sort of role model and confidant to Nagatoro.^{Ch. 59-60} Her given name is not mentioned until chapter 118 where she meets Nagatoro and her friends at a judo training camp.^{Ch. 118}
Orihara (折原)
Voiced by: Kaori Maeda (Japanese); Brittany Cox (English)
An Olympic-level judoka who competes at school with Nagatoro and Senpai's friends. When the two were children, she and Nagatoro practiced judo with each other, with Nagatoro's natural ability lets her win every single time, but as Orihara put in constant hard work and became much stronger over time, Nagatoro began losing her passion, ultimately quitting after being overwhelmed by her in a match.^{Ch. 79} She seemed unaware of the strained relationship with Nagatoro, treating her in a friendly and enthusiastic way, and since Nagatoro resumed judo practice, she has been friendly, supported and sometimes teased her about the relationship with Senpai, along with Gamo.^{Ch. 84}
Hana Sunomiya (須ノ宮 花, Sunomiya Hana)
Voiced by: Sayumi Suzushiro (Japanese); Xanthe Huynh (English)
A first-year who joins the art club at the beginning of the new term. She is the younger cousin of the club president and was previously in the same art club as Senpai in middle school.^{Ch. 83} She supports Senpai's relationship with Nagatoro, although Nagatoro is suspicious of her and worries Senpai will become interested in Sunomiya.^{Ch. 84} Her given name is not mentioned until volume 11, where it is dropped in an extra sketch between chapters,^{Vol. 11} and is mentioned in the proper story in chapter 88.^{Ch. 88}

== Media ==
=== Webcomic ===
Nanashi first posted early prototypes of what would become Don't Toy with Me, Miss Nagatoro on Pixiv between August 2011 and December 2015, with five issues total released during this period.

=== Manga ===
Don't Toy with Me, Miss Nagatoro was serialized through Magazine Pocket, published by Kodansha, from November 1, 2017, to July 23, 2024. It was compiled into 20 volumes through Kodansha's Shōnen Magazine Comics imprint, with the first volume released on March 9, 2018, and the last on August 7, 2024. There is a special edition of the second volume containing works by several other artists. A comic anthology featuring special chapters by various artists was released on April 24, 2021.

The manga has been licensed by Vertical in North America and the first volume was released in November 2019. Two box sets of the English manga have also been released, compiling volumes 1 to 6 and 7 to 12. Each comes with color art from the series on the box and an acrylic standee of Nagatoro.

The manga has been licensed by Noeve Grafx in France.

=== Volumes ===
No.	Original release date	Original ISBN	English release date	English ISBN
1	March 9, 2018	978-4-06-511196-3	November 19, 2019	978-1-94-719486-1
This volume covers chapters published in Magazine Pocket from the 2017-11-01 issue to the 2018-01-24 issue: 1. "Senpai, you're kinda..." (センパイって，ちょっと..., Senpai tte chotto...); 2. "Observing Senpai is fun... ♪" (センパイ観察するの楽しーし, Senpai kansatsu suru no tanoshi ̄ shi ♪); 3. "Senpai, don't you get angry?" (センパイって怒らないんですか？, Senpai tte okoranai ndesu ka?); 4. "Senpai's wish just came true!!" (センパイの願望が叶いましたね！！, Senpai no ganbō ga kanaimashita ne!!); 5. "Senpai, please brush your teeth" (センパイ，歯，磨いてきて下さい, Senpai, ha migaite kite kudasai); 6. "'Sup, Senpai!" (ちっす，センパイっ！, Chissu, senpai!); 7. "Senpai, you're still soapy..." (センパイ，泡，残ってますよー, Senpai. Awa, nokottemasu yo.); 8. "Senpai needs a little more..." (センパイは，もうちょっと..., Senpai wa, mō chotto....); Bonus 1: "Did someone give Senpai chocolate...?" (センパイにチョコをあげる人が...？, Senpai ni choko o ageru hito ga...?); Bonus 2: "I'm being defiled by Senpai~♥" (センパイに汚されちゃう～♡, Senpai ni yogosa re chau ~♡)
Senpai is trying to find a spot at the library to draw his manga, but his drawings spill on the floor next to a group of girls who proceed to look at the pages and laugh. All the girls leave except for Miss Nagatoro, who continues to make fun of his not living up to his self-inserted hero, causing Senpai to cry. Nagatoro interrupts Senpai's drawing session and has him try to draw her instead. She pretends to ask him out on a date and learns of Senpai's past of being bullied. She makes him of Senpai's recently bought manga which has fanservice. After having seen a vampire movie, Nagatoro wants to bite Senpai's neck. Senpai watches Nagatoro interact with some boys, hoping they would experience being bullied, but she shows no interest in them. Nagatoro finds Senpai at the hand washing station and offers to lather his hands. Nagatoro offers to model herself sitting and lying on a couch. Bonus manga shorts have her making fun of Senpai's buying his own chocolate for Valentine's Day and calling him while taking a bath.
2	June 8, 2018	978-4-06-511675-3; 978-4-06-511990-7 (SE)	February 18, 2020	978-1-94-998009-7
This volume covers chapters published in Magazine Pocket from the 2018-02-07 issue to the 2018-05-02 issue. Chapters were published in Weekly Shonen Magazine from the 2017 issue 49, 2018 issue 2/3, and 2018 issue 14. A special edition was released in paperback with an included full-color booklet. The booklet included illustrations done by 12 guest artists.: 9. "You're too guillble, Senpai~♥" (センパイ､ちょろ過ぎる～♡, Senpai, choro sugiru ~♡); 10. "Come on, Senpai! Fight back!" (ほらセンパイ!ツッコミツッコミ!, Hora senpai! Tsukkomitsukkomi!); 11. "Senpai! Come here!~" (センパーイ､こっちこっち?, Senpāi, kotchi kotchi ~); 12. "Senpai, let's play a game!" (センパーイ､ゲームしましょう!, Senpāi Gēmu shimashou!); Side story: "Practice makes perfect, Senpai!" (何事も実践からですよ､センパイ, Nanigoto mo jissen karadesu yo, senpai); 13. "Senpai's afraid!" (センパイびびってるぅー, Senpai bibitteru ~u ｰ); 14. "No, you drew this, Senpai!" (いや､これセンパイの絵でしょ, Iya, kore senpai no edesho); Side story 2: "Senpai, I'm ready now!" (センパイ､準備出来ましたよ); Side story 3: "See ya, Sen-pai ♥" (じゃーねー､セ・ン・パ・イ?); Bonus 1: "Senpai, move your hand a bit lower" (センパイ､手､もうちょっと下げてー, Senpai,-te, mō chotto sagete); Bonus 2: "I bet you're sensitive, Senpai~♥" (センパイって敏感そ~♡, Senpai tte binkan-so~♡)
Senpai has a fantasy dream where he is fighting monsters alongside Nagatoro in a cheerleader catgirl outfit; when they get to the demon's castle, he discovers that the demon king is none other than Nagatoro. Nagatoro tells Senpai to respond to her jabs like a tsukkomi comedy character. He meets Nagatoro's friends (Gamo and Yosshii) who think he is Nagatoro's boyfriend. Nagatoro challenges Senpai to a nipple poking game. Senpai imagines Nagatoro in her cat costume and draws her arching her back in a defensive posture to her friends. Nagatoro wants to pierce Senpai's ears. Side and bonus stories include: Nagatoro tells Senpai he needs to compliment people if he wants to be complimented himself. Nagatoro interrupts Senpai's drawing session by offering to pose in her swimsuit. Nagatoro snatches Senpai's phone and dares him to reach into her skirt pocket to get it. Nagatoro gets candy from Senpai for White Day and tries to interpret Senpai's romantic intentions. Nagatoro tries to tickle Senpai.
3	October 9, 2018	978-4-06-512176-4; 978-4-06-513635-5 (SE)	August 18, 2020	978-1-94-998010-3
This volume covers chapters in Magazine Pocket from the 2018-05-16 issue to the 2018-09-19 issue. Volume 3 was released in paperback and eBook by Shonen Magazine Comics with a total of 163 pages, 9 chapters and 2 bonus chapters. A special edition was released in paperback with an included full-color booklet which put Senpai and Nagatoro in erotic situations. The booklet included illustrations done by 10 guest artists.: 15. "Senpai, Your Arms Are So Skinny!!" (センパイ，腕ほっそ！！, Senpai, ude hosso!!); 16. "If We Buzz That Fluff, Senpai" (センパイのもこもこ, Senpai no mokomoko); 17. "Say, Senpai" (ねぇ，センパイ, Ne~e, senpai); 18. "Let's Do It Again Sometime, Senpai" (またやりましょうね，センパイっ, Mata yarimashou ne, senpai); 19. "Senpai, You Creep! ♥" (センパイ，キモ～♡, Senpai, Kimo ~♡); 20. "Thanks, Senpai..." (あざっす，センパイ..., Azassu, senpai...); 21. "Thanks for the Treat, Senpai!!" (センパイ，ゴチっス！！, Senpai, Gochi ssu!!); 22. "Senpai! Let's Go to the Beach!!" (センパイ！海，行きましょー！！, Senpai! Umi, ikimasho!!); 23. "I'll Rub It in for You, Senpai ♥" (塗ってあげますよ♡センパイ, Nutte agemasu yo ♡ senpai); Bonus 1: "What Do Ya Think, Senpai?! Check These Hip Moves!!" (どっスかセンパイ！！この腰使い！！, Dossu ka senpai! ! Kono koshi tsukai!!); Bonus 2: "I'll Boost Your Spirits, Senpai ♥" (センパイのやる気を...応援しちゃいますよ, Senpai no yaruki o... ōen shi chaimasu yo)
Nagatoro makes fun of Senpai's skinny arms and has him do push-ups while she sits on his back. Nagatoro offers to give Senpai a haircut, but when she leaves temporarily to find a comb, Gamo and Yosshii arrive and try to use her hair clippers on him. While waiting at a gazebo for the rain to settle, Nagatoro teases that Senpai has perverted intentions of looking at her in soaked clothes. She invites him over to her house to dry off and play video games. Gamo and Yosshii visit the art club room and dare "Paisen" to touch Gamo's boob. Nagatoro and Senpai wait in line for shaved ice. Nagatoro and Senpai exchange Line IDs and calls him lewd for thinking about an indirect kiss from drinking from his water bottle. Senpai goes to the beach with Nagatoro, Gamo, and Yosshii. When Nagatoro offers to put suntan lotion on him, the other girls want to join in the fun. The bonus manga include Nagatoro playing with a hula hoop and Nagatoro dressed as a cheerleader to try to inspire Senpai to draw.
4	February 8, 2019	978-4-06-514440-4	November 3, 2020	978-1-94-998048-6
This volume covers chapters published in Magazine Pocket from the 2018-10-17 issue to the 2019-02-09 issue, and the Weekly Shonen Magazine 2019 issue 2/3: 24. "Senpai, Why Don't We Go to the Festival?" (センパイ，お祭り行きませんか？, Senpai, omatsuri ikimasen ka?); 25. "Senpai, Please Don't Drag Me Down" (センパイ，足引っ張らないで下さいよー, Senpai, ashi hipparanaide kudasai yo~); 26. "This Is Like a Date, Isn't It, Senpai? ♥" (デートみたいっすね，センパイ♡, Dēto mitaissu ne, senpai♡); Bonus 1: "That's Right, Huh, Senpai" (そっスね，センパイ, Sossu ne, senpai); 27. "Let's Leave, Senpai" (帰りましょう，センパイ, Kaerimashou, senpai); 28. "Stay Still, Paisen!" (パイセンじっとしてろよ！, Paisen jitto shi tero yo!); 29. "Let's Do Rock-Paper-Scissors, Senpai!!" (じゃんけんしましょう，センパイ！！, Jan ken shimashou, senpai!!); 30. "I Saw You, Senpai..." (見てましたよ，センパイ..., Mitemashita yo, senpai...); Bonus 2: "Senpai, Your Body Seems So Stiff" (センパイって体，硬そーですよねぇ, Senpai tte karada, kata-so ̄desu yo nee); Extra: "Senpai, You're a Real Creep ♥" (センパイ，マジキモ～, Senpai, majikimo~); Side story 1: "Senpai, Stand Up!! 1" (センパイスタンダップ！！ １, Senpai Sutandappu!! 1); Side story 2: "Senpai, Stand Up!! 2" (センパイスタンダップ！！ ２, Senpai Sutandappu!! 2)
After assuming Nagatoro would call him to invite him to a summer festival, Senpai decides to go by himself but is captured by Gamo and Yosshii there. Nagatoro, who was finishing swim practice, rushes over and challenges her friends on some booth games to "win" him back. Senpai takes Nagatoro alone to a spot to watch the fireworks. Senpai sees Nagatoro, Gamo, Yosshii, and a fourth girl Sakura chatting with some guys but notices Nagatoro isn't really interested in hanging out with the guys, so he walks up and tells Nagatoro to come home. The girls try to remove a splinter from Senpai's finger, but Nagatoro is suspicious it might mean something more. Nagatoro and Senpai play rock paper scissors over carrying their schoolbags. Nagatoro sees Senpai is really slow at distance running, so she teases him in an extra practice session. In the bonus and side stories: Nagatoro and Senpai talk about having Nagatoro wear a yukata next time. Nagatoro and Senpai try out different stretching exercises. Nagatoro calls Senpai gross as usual until her friends arrive and say he isn't and pull him away. Nagatoro tries to get Senpai to practice sparring with her. Her friends want to spar too.
5	June 7, 2019	978-4-06-515305-5; 978-4-06-516748-9 (SE)	January 19, 2021	978-1-94-998085-1
This volume covers chapters in Magazine Pocket from the 2019-02-06 issue to the 2019-05-29 issue, and Weekly Shonen Magazine 2019 issue 18. The special edition of this volume was released with a 36-page comic anthology drawn by 11 guest artists.: 31. "You Have No Sense of Adventure, Senpai" (冒険心ってものがセンパイに足りないとこなんですよ, Bōkenshin tte mono ga senpai ni tarinai toko nandesu yo); 32. "Senpai's a Closet Perv!!" (センパイはムッツリだし！！, Senpai wa muttsuridashi!!); 33. "Senpai, What's in Your Bento Lunch?" (センパイ，弁当なんですか？, Senpai, bentō nandesu ka?); 34. "As If a Creep Like Senpai Could Go on a Proper Date!!" (キモキモセンパイがまともにデート出来るわけ無いっしょ！！, Kimokimosenpai ga matomo ni dēto dekiru wakenaissho‼); Side story: It May Be More Fun Than You'd Expect, Ex-Senpai ♡" (意外と楽しいかもしれないっスね，元センパイ♡, Igaito tanoshī kamo shire naissu ne, moto senpai♡); 35. "We'd End Up Becoming Your Senpais, Right, Paisen?" (うちらがパイセンのセンパイになるって事だよなぁ？, Uchi-ra ga paisen no senpai ni naru tte kotoda yo nā?); 36. "Senpai, You Made Me Do This..." (センパイがさせたんだろ..., Senpai ga sa seta ndaro...); 37. "Senpai, You're Staring Off into Space" (センパイが遠い目してる, Senpai ga tōi me shi teru); 38. "Let's Go for It, Senpai!!" (やってやりますよ，センパイ！！, Yatte yarimasu yo, senpai!!); Bonus: "Senpai, You've Gone Beet Red" (センパイ，顔真っ赤っスよ～？, Senpai, kao makka ssu yo ~?)
When Nagatoro tells Senpai he needs to be more adventurous like trying a different flavored drink; Senpai gets the bottles mixed up. Nagatoro and friends suspect Senpai is hiding an erotic book in the art club room. After Nagatoro and friends make fun of Senpai's bento lunch, Senpai brings a better one the next day that really impresses the girls. In order to shake off a stalker, Sakura has Senpai go on a pretend date with her, but Nagatoro follows along and interrupts it before it even gets started. Nagatoro helps Senpai study for midterms by suggesting he would repeat a grade and be in the same class as her and the girls. Nagatoro's friends make fun of the possibility that Senpai could be held back two years in a row and they would be his senpais. Nagatoro wants Senpai to draw her but Senpai says she has to dress up in that cat costume first, so the next week, she does. The girls talk about the upcoming school culture festival until the art club president arrives. Seeing that the club has turned into a hangout spot, she threatens to disband it, until Nagatoro defends Senpai. They agree to a challenge where Senpai and President will have separate festival exhibits, and whoever garners more popular votes wins. In the bonus story, Nagatoro stuffs Senpai's anpan buns in her shirt and dares Senpai to try to pick which one of her breasts has it.
6	November 8, 2019	978-4-06-517518-7; 978-4-06-517519-4 (SE)	March 30, 2021	978-1-94-998098-1
This volume covers chapters published in Magazine Pocket from the 2019-06-12 issue to the 2019-09-18 issue. Volume 6 was released in paperback and eBook by Shonen Magazine Comics with a total of 176 pages, 8 chapters and 2 bonus chapters. The special edition of this volume was released with an original art calendar for 2020.: 39. "Whadda You Think of It, Senpai?" (センパイはどう思ってんスか？, Senpai wa dō omotten su ka?); 40. "Come On! Just Admit You Want It, Senpai! ♡" (素直じゃないんだからー、センパイはー♡, Sunao ja nai ndakara ̄, senpai wa~♡); 41. "A-Are You All Right, Senpai?" (だっ大丈夫っすスか センパイー, Daddaijōbu ssu ka senpai ~?); 42. "Senpai, You're Being Naïve About This Contest" (センパイは勝負を甘く見てますね, Senpai wa shōbu o amaku mitemasu ne?); 43. "Senpai, You Can Put Up a Good Fight!!" (センパイはいい勝負出来ますよ！！, Senpai wa yoi shōbu dekimasu yo!!); 44. "Toro-Cat Needs to Do Better Than That" (トロキャットなめてんじゃねぇ, Torokyatto name tenja nē); 45. "Has Spring Finally Come for Senpai, The Unpopular Lone Louse?!" (非モテはぐフナセンパイにもついに春が到来っスかー！？, Hi mote hagu-funa senpai ni mo tsuini haru ga tōrai ssu ka ~!?); 46. "She Said Something About Love, Didn't She, Senpai?" (愛とか言われちゃってますよぉセンパーイ？, Ai toka iwa re chattemasu yo ~o senpāi?); Bonus 1: "Senpai! ♡ Whadda You Think About This Pose?" (セーンパイ♡ こーんなポーズとかどっスかー？, Sēnpai♡ ko ̄ n'na pōzu toka dossu ka~?); Bonus 2: "Are You Okay, Senpai?!" (おまけ２ 大丈夫っスか、センパイ！！, Daijōbu ssu ka, senpai!!)
The girls try to strategize how to beat President in the art contest when Senpai brings out President's previous drawing. When Nagatoro and friends bring out some costume suggestions, Senpai refuses to have Nagatoro model, which upsets Nagatoro. When she sees Senpai with President, the latter of whom is draped in only a towel, she runs off. President tells Senpai to chase her down. Senpai finds Nagatoro and asks her to be his model. After Senpai makes several drawings, Nagatoro and the girls go off to scout President's drawing but Nagatoro is stunned, and the girls drag her away. President tells Senpai not to listen in on the girls' schemes. The day of the festival, Nagatoro shows up in her cat costume along with some cat mascots to do a bullying dance and to promote Senpai's art. She even acts cold to her fans. When Senpai starts to gain some popularity with some random girls, Nagatoro gets a little jealous pulls him aside to roam the festival with him. Meanwhile, the President, whose nude drawing had garnered lots of votes but is confiscated by the student council, concedes the challenge, allowing the art club to stay. She comments that Senpai's drawings have improved because she can see the love in the pictures. In the bonus manga: Nagatoro tries out different poses. President poses in a swimsuit for Senpai which gets Nagatoro to challenge her.
7	March 9, 2020	978-4-06-518517-9; 978-4-06-518787-6 (SE)	May 11, 2021	978-1-64-729010-8
This volume covers chapters published in Magazine Pocket from the 2019-10-16 issue to the 2020-01-15 issue: 47. "Since We're Good Pals 'n' All, Senpai" (センパイと私の仲なんスからー, Senpai to watashi no naka nansuka-ra~); 48. "You're the Star of the Show, Senpai" (センパイが主役っス!, Senpai ga shuyaku ssu!); 49. "Senpai, Are You Asking Me Out?!" (センパイのお誘いっスか！？, Senpai no osasoi ssu ka!?); 50. "Please Take Me by the Hand and Teach Me, Senpai ♡" (手取り足取り教えて下さいね センパイ♡, Tetori ashitori oshiete kudasai ne senpai♡); 51. "What Do You Want with My Senpai...?" (ウチのセンパイに何か...？, Uchi no senpai ni nanika...?); 52. "That's What We Get from Imagining Your Future Realistically, Senpai!" (センパイの将来をリアルに予想した結果っスよ？, Senpai no shōrai o riaru ni yosō shita kekka ssu yo?); 53. "Senpai, Please Get Them on Me Quickly! ♡" (センパイっ早くはかせて下さいよ～♡, Senpai hayaku haka sete kudasai yo～♡); Bonus: "We'll Have a Sketch Competition, Senpai" (スケッチ勝負っスよ センパイ, Suketchi shōbu ssu yo senpai)
Nagatoro gives Senpai a lesson on how to approach someone from behind. The girls invite Senpai to a sushi dinner party. President gives Senpai tickets to the zoo to ask Nagatoro out, but they have to do drawings there. During the date, Senpai tries to teach Nagatoro to draw, and while Nagatoro takes a bathroom break, some classmates drop by and make fun of Senpai's teaching. Nagatoro steps in and persuades them to think they are good drawings. Nagatoro and Senpai imagine themselves as adults drinking in a bar. Nagatoro has Senpai put her stockings on her legs. In the bonus manga, Senpai and Nagatoro are sketching in the mountains when they encounter President naked in the woods.
8	July 9, 2020	978-4-06-520103-9; 978-4-06-520104-6 (SE)	September 21, 2021	978-1-64-729050-4
This volume covers chapters published in Magazine Pocket from the 2020-02-12 issue to the 2020-06-03 issue: 54. "So You Read Girls' Manga, Huh, Senpai?" (センパイ、少女マンガなんて読むんスね, Senpai, shōjo manga nante yomu n su ne~); 55. "Well, Then Maybe I'll Just Have...a Lick of Yours, Senpai ♡" (じゃあセンパイの...舐めちゃおっかな～♡, Jā senpai no... namecha okkana ~♡); 56. "Senpai? What's Wrong...?" (センパイ？ どーしたんスか...？, Senpai? Do ̄ shita n su ka...?); 57. "Well Said! Especially for You, Paisen!!" (言うじゃねーか パイセンの割によー！！, Iu ja ne ̄ ka paisen no wari ni yo ̄ ‼); 58. "Senpai...Did You...Overhear Us Just Then...?" (センパイ...さっきの...聞いてました...？, Senpai... sakki no... kiitemashita...?); 59. "Come on in, Senpai-kun! ♡" (上がってってくれたまえよ センパイ君？, Agatte tte kure tamae yo senpai-kun?); 60. "Senpai, Umm...Thanks...For Paying Me a Visit" (センパイ その...あざっス...お見舞い, Senpai sono... aza ssu... omimai); 61. "Senpai...What Were You Talking About With My Sister...?" (センパイ...姉と何 話してたんスか...？, Senpai... ane to nani hanashi teta n su ka...?); 62. "Senpai...So You Want To Know...My Name!!" (センパイ...知りたいんだ...私の名前！！, Senpai... shiritai nda... watashi no namae!!); Bonus: "You Like This Kind of Thing, Don't You, Senpai?" (センパイ好きっスねー こーゆーの, Senpai suki ssu ne ̄ ko ̄ yu ̄ no)
When Senpai reads a shōjo manga where the characters resemble Nagatoro and himself, Nagatoro has him re-create a situation where he has to lick her shoes. Senpai and Nagatoro go out for ice cream. While preparing for a school-wide distance run, Senpai tweaks his ankle. In the actual run, he tries to keep up with Nagatoro and her friends as they try to outrace President, but cannot go very far. Nagatoro and then her friends join in to carry him to the finish. When Nagatoro leaves her cellphone behind, Senpai takes it to her classroom but he hides in a locker when Nagatoro, Sakura and some other girl classmates arrive and talk about romance interests. He is eventually found out. When Nagatoro doesn't visit, Senpai learns that Nagatoro is home sick. Gamo and Yosshi have Senpai take the printouts to Nagatoro's home where he meets Nagatoro's older sister. While Nagatoro and Senpai have a snack and play video games, Nagatoro asks Senpai what he and her sister talked about, and what secrets he wants to know about herself. Senpai asks for her given name, but after some hesitancy, they are interrupted by Nagatoro's sister who blurts it out. In the bonus manga, Nagatoro reads a manga where the couple are stuck in an escape room and must do "lewd things". She then stops Senpai from escaping the art club room.
9	November 9, 2020	978-4-06-521245-5; 978-4-06-521249-3 (SE)	December 7, 2021	978-1-64-729072-6
This volume covers chapters published in Magazine Pocket from the 2020-02-12 issue to the 2020-06-03 issue: 63. "Morning, Senpai" (おはざーす センパイ, Ohaza~su senpai!); 64. "So This Is Your Room, Huh, Senpai?" (ここがセンパイの部屋っスかー, Koko ga senpai no heya ssu ka); 65. "You Stay Here and Mind the House, Okay, Senpai? ♥" (お留守番しててくださいねー セーンパイ♡, Orusuban shitete kudasai ne ̄ sēnpai ♡); 66. "Why, You! You of All People, Senpai!" (このっ センパイのくせにっ, Kono senpai no kuse ni); 67. "I'm Not Telling You, Senpai! ♡" (センパイには教えてあげなーい♡, Senpai ni wa oshiete agena ̄ i ♡); 68. "Well, Thanks for Treating Me, Senpai!" (いやーゴチっス センパイ！, Iya ̄gochi ssu senpai!); 69. "You Aren't Spending Christmas Alone, Are You, Senpai? ♡" (センパイ クリボッチじゃないっスか～♡, Senpai kuribotchi ja naissuka~♡); 70. "Well, I've Got Something for You Too, Senpai..." (じゃー私からセンパイにも..., Ja ̄ watashi kara senpai ni mo...); Bonus: "The Boy-less Crew - All-Night Karaoke of Fury" (男いない組 怒りの徹カラ, Otoko inai gumi ikari no tetsukara); Bonus: "Christmas Presents" (クリスマスプレゼント, Kurisumasu Purezento); Bonus: "Ghost of the Pale Woman" (白い女の霊, Shiroi on'na no rei)
Nagatoro shares with Senpai about an article about different moves girls do to excite guys. Senpai is sick and has to rest at home so Nagatoro visits. She helps take care of him and he dreams that she's his wife, and inadvertently calls her by her given name. Senpai later asks Nagatoro to model for her in a natural pose but afterwards she gives him a headlock. Senpai treats Nagatoro to a croquette and ponders how to fill out his future plans form. Senpai wants to give Nagatoro a Christmas present, but Nagatoro's friends want to have a karaoke group party. Senpai and Nagatoro excuse themselves to the art club room but before they can give each other presents, the President appears, and they have to find another room and eventually settle with the school rooftop after everyone else has left. In the bonus manga: Nagatoro's single friends go to karaoke. Nagatoro asks her sister for Christmas presents advice. A schoolmate named Rabi-chan and her boyfriend heard of a rumor of a ghost girl roaming the hallways and encounter her.
10	March 9, 2021	978-4-06-522644-5; 978-4-06-522647-6 (SE)	April 12, 2022	978-1-64-729003-0
This volume covers chapters published in Magazine Pocket from the 2020-11-04 issue to the 2021-02-17 issue: 71. "So Then, Senpai, What Will Your Fortune Be This Year?" (さあセンパイの今年の運勢は～？, Sa~a senpai no kotoshi no unsei wa ~?); 72. "What'cha End Up Wishing for, Senpai?" (センパイは結局 何お願いしたんスか？, Senpai wa kekkyoku nani onegai shita n su ka?); 73. "So You're Gonna Start Wearing Contacts, Aren't You!!" (センパイ コンタクトするんすねー！！, Senpai kontakuto suru n su neー!!); 74. "So That's What Your Ski Skills Look Like, Huh, Senpai" (センパイの滑りってやっぱそんな感じなんスね, Senpai no suberi tte yappa son'na kanjina n su ne); 75. "You Know, That Felt Pretty Good, Senpai ♡" (なかなかいー感じでしたよ センパイ♡, Nakanaka i ̄ kanjideshita yo senpai♡); 76. "Why Don't You Try Gettin' Into Shape, Paisen?" (パイセンさ ちょーっと体鍛えてみねぇ？, Paisen-sa cho ̄ tto karada kitaete minē?); 77. "I'm Pretty Sure You're Not Into This Stuff at All, Senpai!!" (センパイこーゆーの絶対興味ないっしょ！！, Senpai ko ̄ yu ̄ no zettai kyōmina issho!!); 78. "You Were Scared Outta Your Wits, Senpai!" (センパイ めっちゃビビってた～！, Senpai metcha bibitteta ~!); Bonus: "The President's Drilling Paisen One-on-One" (ぶちょ～さんがパイセン マンツーマンでしごいてるってさ～, Bucho~-san ga paisen mantsūman de shigoi teru tte sa~)
Nagatoro hints to Senpai to visit the shrine for Hatsumōde where she works as a miko there. Nagatoro offers to put contact lenses in Senpai's eyes. Nagatoro and Senpai go snow skiing together. Senpai is still a beginner, so Nagatoro teaches him a little bit. As he practices, he helps another beginner from crashing into a tree, and then is rescued from crashing into some other skiers by Nagatoro who has switched to snowboarding. With President getting accepted into an arts school, Senpai ponders what to do for his future plans. He considers entering a school judo tournament. Gamo invites Senpai to train at her family's gym, and after seeing Nagatoro is featured, Senpai asks Nagatoro to train him. In the bonus manga, President offers to train Senpai in judo, but becomes more of a distraction because she is not wearing anything underneath her uniform.
11	August 6, 2021	978-4-06-524023-6	May 17, 2022 (digital); August 16, 2022 (print)	978-1-68-491285-8; 978-1-64-729092-4
This volume covers chapters published in Magazine Pocket from the 2021-03-10 issue to the 2021-06-30 issue: 79. "What's Up, Senpai?" (なんスか センパイ, Senpai ga isshō demo dekitara... ne); 80. "Senpai, If You Can at Least Win One Match...That Is" (センパイが一勝でもできたら...ね, Senpai to osoroi towa~); 81. "Can't Believe I Got Lumped in With You, Senpai..." (センパイとお揃いとは～, Sā! Dō nansuka! Senpai!); 82. "Well?! What's Your Answer, Senpai?!" (さあ！どうなんスか！センパイっ！, Hachiōji senpai ni wa taihen osewaninarimashita); 83. "I Am Greatly Indebted to My Senior, Hachioji-Senpai" (八王子先輩には大変お世話になりました, Senpai wa deatte shimatta nodesu ne); 84. "But Then You Met, And It Happened" (先輩は出会ってしまったのですね, Senpai wa watashi ga inakute sabishiku naissuka...?); 85. "Do You Miss Me Now That I'm Not Around, Senpai...?" (センパイは私がいなくて寂しくないっスか...？, Senpāi issho ni ikimashou yo ̄ ‼); 86. "Senpai, Let's Go Together!!" (センパーイ一緒に行きましょうよー‼♡, Massāji shite kudasai yo senpai♡); Bonus: "Please Give Me a Massage, Senpai! ♥" (マッサージして下さいよ センパイ♡, Massāji shite kudasai yo senpai♡)
Senpai notices Nagatoro is not eager to fight Orihara. Senpai motivates Nagatoro. In return, Nagatoro promises to give Senpai a kiss if he wins a match. Senpai uses Nagatoro's judo advice in a match, and she calls out to him not to give up. In the end, Senpai loses the match. The match between Orihara and Nagatoro begins. Senpai calls out to Nagatoro not to give up. Nagatoro loses the match but is enthusiastic to get her revenge. Nagatoro asks if Senpai will kiss her if she wins. Nagatoro informs Senpai that she has joined the judo club to beat Orihara and to get a kiss from him. Nagatoro teases Senpai about whether he wants to kiss her but is interrupted by a student who wishes to join the art club. Senpai introduces the new art club member, Hana, to Nagatoro. Hana is revealed to be the President's cousin. Hana compliments Senpai's improvement in painting. Meanwhile, Gamo and Orihara tease Nagatoro about her concern for Senpai is affecting her judo. Hana tells Senpai to go on a date with Nagatoro. President and Hana convince Senpai to ask Nagatoro out on a date. Senpai asks Nagatoro out after waiting for judo club practice to end. Senpai and Nagatoro discuss where to go on their date. Senpai asks Nagatoro out to the aquarium and Nagatoro agrees. In the bonus manga, Gamo and Yoshi walk in on Senpai giving Nagatoro a massage.
12	December 9, 2021	978-4-06-526278-8	September 30, 2022	978-1-64-729150-1
87. "'Sup, Senpai" (チース センパイっ, Chīsu senpai!); 88. "This Is Just a Practice Date for You, Senpai! Got It?!" (センパイのデートの練習っスからね!?, Senpai no Dēto no renshū ssukara ne!?); 89. "I'll Reveal Your Score for Today, Senpai!!" (今日のセンパイの点数発表ですっ!!, Kyō no senpai no tensū happyō desu!!); 90. "Well, Then... Shall We Do Something That Would Be Appropriate for a Real Date?" (じゃあ...本番にふさわしいことしちゃいます？, Jā... honban ni fusawashī koto shi chaimasu?); 91. "What Do You Say, Senpai? Would You Like to Eat It?" (どっスかセンパイ？食べたいっスか～？, Dossu ka senpai? Tabeta issu ka ~?); 92. "I Want to Give Senpai a Real Surprise, After All..." (やっぱりセンパイびっくりさせたいし..., Yappari senpai bikkuri sa setaishi...); 93. "Senpai... You're in High Spirits, Aren't You?" (先輩...浮かれていますね？, Senpai... ukarete imasu ne?); 94. Oh, Senpai, This Guy Is..." (あ センパイ こいつは..., A senpai koitsu wa...); Bonus: "Ah!! Volcano...!!" (あっ!! ボルケーノ...!!, A!! Borukēno...!!); Bonus: "It's Trick and Treat ♥" (トリック&トリートっス♡, Torikku & Torītossu ♡)
13	April 8, 2022	978-4-06-527519-1	November 1, 2022	978-1-64-729165-5
95. "Nagatoro...Hang in There!!" (長瀞...頑張れよ...!!, Nagatoro... ganbareyo...!!); 96. "You Got a Problem With My Senpai?" (私のセンパイに何か...？, Watashi no senpai ni nanika...?); 97. "It's Totes Obvi You're Being Suspicious, Senpai ♡" (センパイがキョドってるの丸わかりっス♡, Senpai ga kyodo tteru no maru wakari ssu♡); 98. "But What About You, Senpai?" (先輩はどうなの？, Senpai wa dōna no?); 99. "Senpai...Are You Satisfied Now That You've Had Your Fill of T&A?" (センパイ...お尻とおっぱい堪能できて満足っスか...？, Senpai... o shiri to oppai tan'nō dekite manzoku ssu ka...?); 100. "If We Were in the Same Grade, Senpai..." (もしセンパイと学年が一緒だったら, Moshi senpai to gakunen ga isshodattara); 101. "Senpai, You Dumbass!!" (センパイのバカ!!, Senpai no baka!!); 102. "If You Absolutely Insist, Senpai" (センパイがどーしてもって言うなら～, Senpai ga dōshitemo tte iunara~); 99.5: "All Right, My Turn Next" (じゃあ次は私の番っスね, Jā tsugi wa watashi no ban ssu ne)
14	August 9, 2022	978-4-06-528772-9	April 11, 2023	978-1-64-729225-6
103. "Don't Just Stand There, Senpai!" (何ボーっとしてんスか！センパイっ！, Nan bō tto shite n su ka! Senpai!); 104. "What's Goin' On With You and Paisen?!" (どうなんだよ!? パイセンとはよー, Dōna nda yo! ? Paisen to wa yo); 105. "You're Gonna Hang With Me, Senpai!" (付き合ってもらいますよーセンパイ！, Tsukiatte moraimasu yo senpai!); 106. "Now, Senpai! You Ready?!" (さあセンパイ！準備はいっスか！？, Sā senpai! Junbi wa issu ka!?); 107. "I...I Want...!!" (俺は 俺は...!!, Ore wa ore wa...!!); 108. "Senpai!! Oh, Senpai!!" (センパイ!!センパイっ!!, Senpai!! Senpai!); 109. "What're You Wanting for, Senpai?!" (何グズグズしてんスか センパイッ!!, Nani guzuguzu shite n su ka senpai!!); Extra: "Boob-Size Showdown!!" (おっぱいの大きさ勝負～!!, Oppai no ōkisa shōbu~!!)
15	January 6, 2023	978-4-06-530336-8	September 15, 2023	978-1-64-729226-3
110. Senpai to Nagatoro senpai wa dōna ndesu ka...? (先輩と長瀞先輩はどうなんですか...？); 111. Senpai no sōdan ni notte agete... kudasai!! (センパイの相談に乗ってあげて...下さい!!); 112. Senpai wa dotchi kakitai n su ka? (センパイはどっち描きたいんスか？); 113. Yoroshiku onegaishimasu ne senpai ♡ (よろしくお願いしますね センパイ♡); 114. Yoroshiku onegaishimasu senpai ♡ (よろしくお願いします センパイ♡); 115. Watashi ni chū shite hoshī n su yo ne senpai wa♡ (私にチューして欲しいんスよね センパイは♡); 116. Hissatsu!! Senpai goroshi ~!! (必殺!!センパイ殺し～!!); Extra: Sukoshi... Nuide yote kurenai ka...? (少し... 脱いでよてくれないか...?)
16	May 9, 2023	978-4-06-531656-6	April 30, 2024	978-1-64-729304-8
117. Senpai no toko mo kyōka gasshuku ssu ka) (センパイのとこも強化合宿っスか); 118. Senpai! ? To usagi-domo... (センパイ!?とウサギ共...); 119. Da yo ne ~ senpai-kun? (だよね～センパイ君？); 120. Hayatchito mo issho ni hairitakatta~ (ハヤっちとも一緒に入りたかった~); 121. Senpai ga naite tanomu kara♡ (センパイが泣いて頼むからっ♡); 122. Senpai no kuse ni... namaiki ssu yo... (センパイのくせに...生意気っスよ...); 123. ...... Ne senpai... (......ね センパイ...); 124. Senpai kono shōbu ukete tachimasu yo!! (センパイ この勝負受けて立ちますよ!!); Extra: Kokoro to karada o tokihanate (心と身体を解き放て)
17	September 8, 2023	978-4-06-532882-8	August 27, 2024	978-1-64-729305-5
125. Yappa Senpai wa Ihyō o Tsuite Kimasu ne (やっぱセンパイは意表をついてきますね); 126. Senpai Ima Koso Gekiryū o Kudaru Toki ssu yo! (センパイ今こそ激流を下る時っスよ！); 127. Senpai... Kyō wa... Tokubetsu ssu yo (センパイ…今日は…特別っスよ); 128. Osewa ni Nattemasu Uchi no Senpai ga…!! (お世話になってます ウチのセンパイが…!!); 129. Senpai Datte Ganbatte ndashi (センパイだって頑張ってんだし); 130. Senpai ga Kotchi de Don'na Kanji ka… (センパイがこっちでどんな感じか…); 131. Senpai Matte!! (センパイ待ってー!!)
18	December 7, 2023	978-4-06-533935-0	January 7, 2025	978-1-64-729384-0
132. Nee Senpai... Konaida no Hanashi nansu Kedo... (ねぇ センパイ…こないだの話なんスけど…); 133. Wakattassu yo Senpai no Iitai Koto... (わかったっスよ センパイの言いたいこと…); 134. Senpāi! Do Dōdeshita!? (センパーイ！ ど どうでした!?); 135. Mune o Hare Hachiōji!! (胸を張れ 八王子!!); 136. Gamo-chan Ikē!! (ガモちゃん いけーっ!!); 137. Ato wa Tanonda ze Paisen (後は頼んだぜ パイセン); 138. Ma~a Senpai ppoi Sukedo (まぁセンパイっぽいスけど)
19	April 9, 2024	978-4-06-535162-8	May 20, 2025	978-1-64-729452-6
139. Senpai no naka ni hōshutsu shita n su! (センパイの中に放出したんス！); 140. Watashi wa senpai to deatta (私はセンパイと出会った); 141. Watashi to senpai no tame ni tatakau!! (私とセンパイのために戦う!!); 142. Senpai!! Cho... cho... cho... (センパイっ!! ちょ…ちょ…ちょ…); 143. Hora nani ka itte kudasai yo senpai (ほら何か言って下さいよ センパイ); 144. Senpai no... senpai no kuse ni... (センパイの…センパイのくせに…); 145. Demo senpai koibito dōshi tte... (でもセンパイ 恋人同士って…)
20	August 7, 2024	978-4-06-536570-0	November 4, 2025	978-1-64-729484-7
146. Senpai no dekata-machi... to iu ka... (センパイの出方待ち…というか…); 147. Senpai! Bukatsu owattara jikan arimasu ka!? (センパイ！ 部活終わったら時間ありますか!?); 148. Watashi to senpai wa... tanin...? (私とセンパイは…他人…？); 149. Senpai chotto koe uwazuttemasen ka...? (センパイちょっと声上ずってませんか…？); 150. Itsumodōri senpai kimo kimo de sā (いつも通りセンパイキモキモでさー); 151. Senpai!! Ganbare!! Senpai!! (センパイッ!! 頑張れっ!! センパイッ!!); 152. Watashi no senpai... (私のセンパイッ…); 153. Senpai no yume wa nandesu ka? (センパイの夢はなんですか？); 154. Senpai!! Nagatoro!! (センパイっ!! 長瀞っ!!)

=== Anime ===
An anime television series adaptation was announced on July 2, 2020. The series was directed by Hirokazu Hanai at Telecom Animation Film, with Taku Kishimoto supervising scripts, Misaki Suzuki designing the characters, and Gin composing the music. It aired from April 11 to June 27, 2021, on Tokyo MX and other channels. (Note: Tokyo MX listed the series premiere at 25:00 on April 10, 2021, which is April 11 at 1:00 a.m.) Crunchyroll streamed the series outside of Southeast Asia. Medialink has licensed the series in Southeast Asia and streamed it on iQIYI, Amazon Prime Video, and Ani-One Asia YouTube channel. Sumire Uesaka performed the opening theme "Easy Love", while Uesaka along with Mikako Komatsu, Aina Suzuki, and Shiori Izawa performed the ending theme "Colorful Canvas" (カラフル・キャンバス, "Karafuru Kyanbasu"). The series ran for 12 episodes.

A second season was announced during an event on October 23, 2021. Titled Don't Toy with Me, Miss Nagatoro 2nd Attack, the season is directed by Shinji Ushiro and produced by OLM, replacing Hanai and Telecom Animation Film. The rest of the main staff returned from the first season. It aired from January 8 to March 26, 2023, with Abema streaming each episode one week in advance of its televised broadcast. (Note: Tokyo MX listed the series premiere at 25:00 on January 7, 2023, which is January 8 at 1:00 a.m.) Uesaka performed the opening theme "Love Crazy", while Uesaka along with Komatsu, Suzuki, and Izawa performed the ending theme "My Sadistic Adolescence".

On October 28, 2021, Crunchyroll announced the series would receive an English dub, which premiered on January 11, 2022. English dub voice actress Kimberley Anne Campbell recalled in an interview that she redid her audition to make Nagatoro sound more mean, and "turned on the brattiness and gremlin". English slang phrases were also added to the localized script.

==== Episodes ====
===== Season 1 =====
Story	Episode	Title (Note: All English titles are taken from Crunchyroll.)	Directed by	Written by	Original release date
1	1	"Senpai is a bit ..."; Transliteration: "Senpaitte, Chotto ..." (Japanese: センパイって、ちょっと...)	Juria Matsumura	Taku Kishimoto	April 11, 2021
1	1	"Senpai, don't you ever get angry?" Transliteration: "Senpaitte Okoranain Desu ka?" (Japanese: センパイって怒らないんですか？)	Juria Matsumura	Taku Kishimoto	April 11, 2021
An introverted second-year high school student (Naoto Hachioji, never addressed as such) drops his self-drawn manga at school, and several girls mock him except for Hayase Nagatoro, a first-year student who deduces the hero is based on himself. She torments him by proving his character is braver than him, causing him to cry. He attempts to avoid her, but she interrupts his art club and pushes him into drawing her, but only after teasing him with the suggestion that she pose nude. She also offers him a secret prize for the finished drawing. With the drawing finished, she pretends to offer him a kiss but then mocks him for it, pointing out he was obviously too embarrassed to draw her thighs properly, causing him to cry again. On their way home, she asks him on a date, only to mock him again for thinking she was being serious and accidentally pushes him into a river. When he barely reacts, she demands to know why he is not angry, and he admits after a lifetime of bullying, he can't get angry anymore, and while she annoys him, he somewhat enjoys her attention. Satisfied with his answer, she demands he call her Nagatoro, and she will call him Senpai.
2	2	"You Got Your Wish, Senpai!"; Transliteration: "Senpai no Ganbō ga Kanaimashita ne!!" (Japanese: センパイの願望が叶いましたね！！)	Hirokazu Hanai	Taku Kishimoto	April 18, 2021
2	2	"'Sup, Senpai?!"; Transliteration: "Chissu, Senpai!" (Japanese: ちっす、センパイっ！)	Hirokazu Hanai	Taku Kishimoto	April 18, 2021
Senpai buys an erotic vampire manga, which Nagatoro steals. Reading it, Nagatoro realizes the story is actually interesting, but points out that the cowardly human protagonist clearly resembles Senpai. Nagatoro jumps on Senpai, pretending to vampirize him, only to be repelled by the garlic from his lunch and accidentally grabs his crotch, embarrassing them both. However, she takes the opportunity to tease him for becoming aroused. The next day, Nagatoro proposes a game of accurately poking where each other's nipples are under their clothing, with the prize of a ticket to force the loser to do any one thing without refusing. Senpai agrees, hoping he can force her to stop teasing him. Nagatoro correctly locates Senpai's nipples on her first attempt and assumes Senpai will be too embarrassed to take his turn. When Senpai decides he will try, Nagatoro becomes flustered, declares the game is over, and escapes before he can take his turn. Senpai goes to his favorite restaurant to continue writing his manga when Nagatoro arrives with her friend on a double date with two boys. Senpai notices that Nagatoro seems bored with the boys and does not tease them at all. However, when they meet outside the restaurant, Nagatoro returns to normal and teases Senpai as they walk home.
3	3	"Let's Play Again, Senpai"; Transliteration: "Mata Yarimashō ne, Senpai" (Japanese: またやりましょうね、センパイっ)	Yasuo Tsuchiya	Taku Kishimoto	April 25, 2021
3	3	"Over Here, Senpai!"; Transliteration: "Senpāi, Kotchi Kotchi〜" (Japanese: センパーイ、こっちこっち〜)	Yasuo Tsuchiya	Taku Kishimoto	April 25, 2021
Nagatoro pretends to strip in front of Senpai, revealing she is wearing a swimsuit as underwear, then teases him for believing she would strip naked. Walking home, they shelter from a rainstorm, and Nagatoro teases him over her shirt becoming see-through. Believing she is still wearing her swimsuit, Senpai looks at her and sees her bra, flustering them both. As the rain continues, Nagatoro invites Senpai to her home, which is close compared to his long walk home. Unable to leave after Nagatoro puts his wet clothes in the dryer, Senpai is invited to play games. Being an experienced gamer, Senpai plans to defeat her as revenge, but she continues to tease him and defeats him instead. Despite this, Senpai admits he had fun. The next day, Senpai cannot find anywhere to sit at lunch and is forced to sit with Nagatoro and her friends. Nagatoro shows visible jealousy when they try to touch him and even defends him from their teasing, causing Senpai to loudly declare he and Nagatoro are not dating, which annoys her. She later tries to teach him to turn teasing into a comedy routine with a funny shoulder slap. However, Senpai becomes so flustered he accidentally slaps her breasts, flustering them both, but Nagatoro recovers first and teases him about touching her breasts on purpose.
4	4	"You're All Red, Senpai"; Transliteration: "Senpai, Kao Makkassu yo～?" (Japanese: センパイ、顔真っ赤っスよ～？)	Ryūta Imaizumi Yoshiyuki Kumeda	Taku Kishimoto	May 2, 2021
4	4	"Senpai, You Could Be a Little More ..."; Transliteration: "Senpai wa, Mō Chotto ......" (Japanese: センパイは、もうちょっと......)	Ryūta Imaizumi Yoshiyuki Kumeda	Taku Kishimoto	May 2, 2021
Nagatoro's friends, Gamo and Yosshii, tease him about being a virgin, and force him to squeeze Gamo's breasts before revealing it was really bean buns under her shirt. They flee when Nagatoro arrives and again is jealous, though she is less annoyed after learning Senpai only touched the buns. She instead forces him into another game to guess the difference between a normal and a limited edition bean bun under her shirt, but one of them falls out, and Senpai accidentally squeezes one of her actual breasts, flustering them both and earning Senpai a punishment. Later, while posing for his drawing, Nagatoro notices Senpai is distracted watching classmate Hosakawa, champion of the baseball club, and deduces he is jealous of Hosakawa's popularity. Nagatoro points out he cannot expect praise for his talents if he never praises other people either and demands he praise her, but is surprised when he compliments everything he likes about her. Hence, she compliments his embarrassed reactions to her teasing. Senpai struggles to draw her while she teases him until Nagatoro accidentally falls asleep. For finishing the drawing, Nagatoro pretends to kiss him with his eyes closed, only to reveal he actually kissed a toy and teases him about getting his hopes up, though she does admit she really likes the drawing.
5	5	"Senpai's Poofball"; Transliteration: "Senpai no Mokomoko" (Japanese: センパイのもこもこ)	Yūma Suzuki Sō Toyama	Taku Kishimoto	May 9, 2021
5	5	"Thanks, Senpai!"; Transliteration: "Senpai, Gochissu!!" (Japanese: センパイ、ゴチっス！！)	Yūma Suzuki Sō Toyama	Taku Kishimoto	May 9, 2021
Nagatoro has a nightmare about Senpai ignoring her and spending time with Gamo and Yosshii. Then, she becomes embarrassed when she wakes and finds that Senpai had covered her with a blanket. After tickling him, she dares him to tickle her back but backs out at the last second from embarrassment. She offers to trim his long hair, and he eventually agrees, but she is called away by Gamo and Yosshii, who capture Senpai and threaten to shave his entire head. Senpai manages to resist until a furious Nagatoro returns, sending Gamo and Yosshii fleeing. Touched that he was willing to resist just so she could cut his hair, she gives him a proper haircut. During a heatwave, Nagatoro insists they get shaved ice. Unknown to Nagatoro, Senpai protects her from perverts staring at her where sweat has made her bra visible through her shirt. Seeing her suffering from the heat, Senpai drags her out of the queue of customers to sit in the shade. After she recovers, she buys both of them some convenience store ice cream as thanks. As summer break starts, Senpai believes he won't see Nagatoro all summer until she asks for his phone number, surprising him that she would bother staying in touch. However, she instead begins sending him dozens of messages calling him a pervert.
6	6	"You're Such a Wimp, Senpai ♥"; Transliteration: "Senpai, Choro Sugiru～♡" (Japanese: センパイ、ちょろ過ぎる～♡)	Kaoru Suzuki	Taku Kishimoto	May 16, 2021
6	6	"Senpai! Let's Go to the Beach!!"; Transliteration: "Senpai! Umi, Ikimashō!" (Japanese: センパイ！海、行きましょうー！)	Kaoru Suzuki	Taku Kishimoto	May 16, 2021
Senpai awakens in a fantasy world where he is tasked with defeating a demon lord. He forms a team with feline warrior Nekotoro, Gamo the huntress, and dragon girl Yosshii. Reaching the demon lords' castle, Senpai realizes the girls are actually the three demon lords who tease him for being a cowardly virgin. Senpai awakens in a restaurant, revealing the whole thing was a story he was writing that turned into a nightmare. Nagatoro finds his notebook filled with drawings of her as a sexy cat girl, so she teases him about his fantasies. Nagatoro insists Senpai visit the beach with her, Gamo, and Yosshii, who tease him with their bikinis, much to Nagatoro's jealousy. Senpai insists on sitting in the shade sketching as he hates sunburn and struggles at swimming. Nagatoro offers to rub suncream on him, but he resists, as that is something dating couples do. Irritated at the rejection, Nagatoro violently applies the cream with her foot, then becomes annoyed when Gamo and Yosshii also insist on stepping all over him. Senpai ends up having a lot of fun at the beach, which makes Nagatoro happy. It is later revealed Senpai had been sketching Nagatoro smiling at the beach.
7	7	"Senpai, Want to Go to the Festival?"; Transliteration: "Senpai, Omatsuri Ikimasen ka?" (Japanese: センパイ、お祭り行きませんか？)	Hisaya Takabayashi	Taku Kishimoto	May 23, 2021
7	7	"It's Like a Date, Huh, Senpai?"; Transliteration: "Dēto Mitaissu ne, Senpai♡" (Japanese: デートみたいっすね、センパイ♡)	Hisaya Takabayashi	Taku Kishimoto	May 23, 2021
7	7	"Let's Go Home, Senpai"; Transliteration: "Kaerimashō, Senpai" (Japanese: 帰りましょう、センパイ)	Hisaya Takabayashi	Taku Kishimoto	May 23, 2021
Senpai is surprised Nagatoro does not invite him to the summer festival, so he goes by himself, and bumps into Gamo and Yosshii. They send a picture to Nagatoro, who then rushes to the festival in a fit of jealousy, where Gamo challenges her to win Senpai back. During the festival games, Nagatoro teases Senpai about wanting her to invite him but hints he could have invited her. Nagatoro wins Senpai back, so Gamo and Yosshii leave. Fireworks draw a crowd, so Senpai takes her to a more secluded spot to watch. Nagatoro teases that he is just trying to get her alone despite being too cowardly to try for a kiss. Senpai responds that she is also too cowardly to try, causing an awkward moment. They suddenly realize the secluded spot is a make-out spot, and they are surrounded by kissing couples, so they flee. Senpai suggests they visit next year's festival together, pleasing her. After returning to school, Senpai sees a boy in Nagatoro's group keep putting his arm around her, so he finds the courage to ask Nagatoro to leave with him, which she happily does, as do the girls, leaving the confused boys behind. Senpai meets another of Nagatoro's friends, Sakura, one of the girls who first bullied him for drawing manga in the library.
8	8	"That Might Actually Be Fun, Senpai♥"; Transliteration: "Igai to Tanoshii ka mo Shirenaissu ne, Moto Senpai♡" (Japanese: 意外と楽しいかもしれないっスね、元センパイ♡)	Hitomi Ezoe	Taku Kishimoto	May 30, 2021
8	8	"Let's Play Rock-Paper-Scissors, Senpai!!"; Transliteration: "Janken Shimashō, Senpai!!" (Japanese: じゃんけんしましょう、センパイ！！)	Hitomi Ezoe	Taku Kishimoto	May 30, 2021
As Senpai has weak muscles, Nagatoro forces him to exercise by supporting her on his back, but her butt is too stimulating, and Senpai collapses. Senpai becomes obsessed with a new game and forgets to study. Nagatoro warns him if he has to repeat the year, he will end up in the same class as her. Senpai thoughtlessly blurts out that sounds fun, embarrassing them both, so he studies religiously and passes his exams, where Nagatoro teases him about deliberately avoiding being in her class. Nagatoro overhears Senpai with Gamo, Yosshii, and Sakura sounding suspicious and bursts in on them, only to find them trying to extract a splinter from Senpai's thumb, so Nagatoro jealously extracts the splinter herself. Annoyed over the splinter incident, Nagatoro challenges Senpai to Rock, Paper, Scissors to force him to carry her home when he loses. Senpai almost drops her, and when he tries to catch her, he accidentally grabs her butt with both hands, causing her to flee home in sheer embarrassment. She later calls him to tease him that she is in the bath, his reaction amusing her so much that she accidentally turns on her phone camera so he sees her naked, leaving them both embarrassed again.
9	9	"Senpai's Such a Closet Perv!!"; Transliteration: "Senpai wa Muttsuri Dashi!!" (Japanese: センパイはムッツリだし！！)	Yoshiyuki Kumeda Kōichirō Kuroda	Taku Kishimoto	June 6, 2021
9	9	"There's No Way Creepy Senpai Could Go on a Proper Date!!"; Transliteration: "Kimokimo Senpai ga Matomo ni Dēto Dekiru Wakenaissho!!" (Japanese: キモキモセンパイがまともにデート出来るわけ無いっしょ！！)	Yoshiyuki Kumeda Kōichirō Kuroda	Taku Kishimoto	June 6, 2021
Nagatoro becomes obsessed with boxing and demands Senpai duel her, but Senpai steps too close, and they almost hug, embarrassing them both. The girls are angered when gaming nerds invade their lunchroom, so they send Sakura to break up the nerds' friendships by flirting and making them jealous of each other. The girls do not believe Senpai is interested in girls, but Nagatoro insists he is perverted and wagers he has porn in the clubroom. Nagatoro fails to find any and is mocked by Gamo. Feeling sorry for her, Senpai hints to where he has a dirty magazine, allowing Nagatoro to win and tease him mercilessly. Nagatoro gets a new ear piercing and convinces Senpai to let her pierce his ear. Senpai agrees, but Nagatoro only pretends to do it and teases him about wanting to match her. Sakura reveals one of the nerds is stalking her and asks Senpai to pretend to be her boyfriend, infuriating Nagatoro when he agrees. Observing their fake date, Nagatoro becomes frustrated at their supposed closeness and catches the stalker herself. With the fake date over, Gamo is disappointed she could not take any embarrassing photos of the date. Nagatoro teases him about his awkwardness in dating, which he admits is true.
10	10	"You Seem Pretty Stiff, Senpai"; Transliteration: "Senpaitte Karada, Kata Sō Desu yo nē" (Japanese: センパイって体、硬そーですよねぇ)	Yoshitaka Nagaoka	Taku Kishimoto	June 13, 2021
10	10	"I'll Do It For You, Senpai!!"; Transliteration: "Yatte Yarimasu yo, Senpai!!" (Japanese: やってやりますよ、センパイ！！)	Yoshitaka Nagaoka	Taku Kishimoto	June 13, 2021
Nagatoro offers Senpai "hot snaps," which he assumes are nude photographs until she reveals she was talking about Snapping Hot Chicken and teases him for being perverted. Nagatoro notices Senpai is a slow runner and demands he jog with her. Senpai is distracted when Nagatoro turns up in a revealing running outfit. When he collapses halfway, Nagatoro torments him until he reaches the finish, where she continues to torment him during their cool-down stretches. Senpai needs a model for his latest drawing, and Nagatoro teasingly insists on modeling for him. Senpai agrees but claims he is recreating the cat-girl drawing, so Nagatoro will need to actually wear a cat-girl costume. Senpai later feels guilty about a lie, but is shocked when Nagatoro stubbornly turns up in costume. Hearing familiar footsteps, Senpai surprises Nagatoro by insisting she hide. The art club president, whom Senpai is nervous of, arrives to see how Senpai has been managing the art club in her absence, but when she sees his drawings of cat-girl Nagatoro, she threatens to have the club shut down. Nagatoro furiously reveals herself to defend Senpai's dedication to art. To test this, the president demands Senpai run his own art exhibit at the cultural festival in competition with her own, and if the students vote for Senpai's exhibit as better than hers, she will leave the club alone.
11	11	"What Do You Think, Senpai?"; Transliteration: "Senpai wa Dō Omottensu ka?" (Japanese: センパイはどう思ってんスか？)	Yūma Suzuki	Taku Kishimoto	June 20, 2021
11	11	"You Could Be More Honest, Senpai ♥"; Transliteration: "Sunao ja Nain da Karā, Senpai wā♡" (Japanese: 素直じゃないんだからー、センパイはー♡)	Yūma Suzuki	Taku Kishimoto	June 20, 2021
Senpai is not confident as the president's previous exhibit was a nude painting of herself. Nagatoro is suspicious of Senpai keeping the painting but offers to model for him. Senpai refuses, claiming he was not skilled enough to defeat the president. The girls claim it is because Nagatoro has smaller breasts, causing Senpai to defend Nagatoro, surprising her. Nagatoro models many costumes but admits Senpai's drawings lack impact next to the painting. Senpai decides not to draw Nagatoro anymore in case his exhibit fails, causing Nagatoro to leave. The president splits the club room in half to have privacy for her next nude portrait. She advises Senpai that his paintings are skillful but lack passion. Nagatoro visits but flees after seeing the undressed president. While chasing her, Senpai asks her to model for him, but she refuses. Senpai shocks Nagatoro by saying he is happiest drawing her and doesn't want to draw anyone else, embarrassing her but making her happy and causing them both to fall into the pool, where she cheerfully accuses him of looking at her bra again. Nagatoro asks why Senpai continually sketches her in everyday situations, and he says that is when she is cutest, embarrassing them both but allowing her to tease him. The president visits another student who suggests something else is going on around her competition with Senpai.
12	12	"Has Spring Come Even for You, the Unpopular Loner Louse Senpai?"; Transliteration: "Himote Hagu Funa Senpai ni mo Tsui ni Haru ga Tōraissu ka～?" (Japanese: 非モテはぐフナセンパイにもついに春が到来っスか～？)	Hirokazu Hanai	Taku Kishimoto	June 27, 2021
12	12	"Did You Hear Her Talk About Love, Senpai?"; Transliteration: "Ai Toka Iwarechattemasu yoo Senpāi?" (Japanese: 愛とか言われちゃってますよぉセンパーイ？)	Hirokazu Hanai	Taku Kishimoto	June 27, 2021
Senpai produces paintings of Nagatoro's daily life. Gamo suggests sabotaging the president, but Senpai insists he will compete fairly. The festival arrives, and Nagatoro and the girls wear cat costumes to promote Senpai's paintings. Senpai becomes jealous when Nagatoro teases their visitors, while Nagatoro becomes jealous when girls begin admiring Senpai. Before tensions arise, Gamo allows the two a lunch break, where they immediately dismiss their jealousy. Returning, they find the student council refusing to let the president display her painting, claiming it is immoral. Senpai intervenes, claiming the president's desire to paint herself is no different than his desire to paint Nagatoro and should allow her artistic expression. Nagatoro and the girls also support the president, with Yosshii providing camera footage showing that most students were serious admirers. The council allows the painting to remain but disqualifies the president from the competition, giving Senpai victory and allowing the art club to remain open. The girls gleefully insist the president must endure a loser's punishment and force her into a sexy bunny-girl costume. The president compliments Senpai's paintings, claiming they contain his love, embarrassing him and Nagatoro. Senpai invites Nagatoro to the closing event, a musical concert. The next day, Senpai does another sketch of Nagatoro, and she offers him another reward, only this time, she kisses him for real, though only on the cheek.

===== Season 2: 2nd Attack =====
Story	Episode	Title	Directed by	Written by	Original release date (Note: From episode 2, episodes are released on select platforms a week before their air dates on television.)
13	1	"It's You and Me, Senpai~"; Transliteration: "Senpai to Watashi no Nakanansu kara〜" (Japanese: センパイと私の仲なんスから～)	Yū Takahashi	Taku Kishimoto	January 8, 2023
Nagatoro is still torturing Senpai, laughing at his choice of manga and at how he talks to girls, and trying to get a reaction out of him by having him put her stockings on her.
14	2	"You're Inviting Me, Senpai!?"; Transliteration: "Senpai no Osasoi Suka!?" (Japanese: センパイのお誘いっスか！？)	Kentarō Fujita	Taku Kishimoto	January 15, 2023
The club president gives Senpai tickets to the zoo, insisting that he takes Nagatoro with him to practice life drawing together.
15	3	"Senpai... Were You... Listening to What I Said...?"; Transliteration: "Senpai... Sakki no... Kiitemashita...?" (Japanese: センパイ... さっきの... 聞いてました...?)	Yasuyuki Fuse	Taku Kishimoto	January 22, 2023
Nagatoro forgets her phone in the club room. Senpai tries to bring it back to her, but gets himself into a situation.
16	4	"Why Don't You Come Inside, Senpai-kun?"; Transliteration: "Agattettekureta Maeyo, Senpai-kun♡" (Japanese: 上がってってくれたまえよ センパイ君♡)	Nanako Shimazaki	Taku Kishimoto	January 29, 2023
Senpai visits Nagatoro's house to deliver handouts from school. Her sister lets him in and decides to mess with both him and Nagatoro.
17	5	"So This Is Your Room, Huh, Senpai?"; Transliteration: "Koko ga Senpai no Heya Sukaー" (Japanese: ここがセンパイの部屋っスかー)	Akira Mano	Taku Kishimoto	February 5, 2023
Senpai gets sick, so Nagatoro comes over to check on him. His family happens not to be home.
18	6	"How Are Your Fortunes This Year, Senpai?"; Transliteration: "Sā Senpai no Kotoshi no Unsei wa～？" (Japanese: さあセンパイの今年の運勢は～？)	Kazuya Mihashi	Taku Kishimoto	February 12, 2023
Senpai has a Christmas gift for Nagatoro, but The Friends get in the way of him handing it to her.
19	7	"I Figured That's How You'd Ski, Senpai"; Transliteration: "Senpai no Suberi-tte Yappa Sonna Kanjinan Sune" (Japanese: センパイの滑りってやっぱそんな感じなんスね)	Yasuyuki Fuse	Taku Kishimoto	February 19, 2023
Senpai, Nagatoro and their classmates go skiing. Nagatoro is a good skier, but Senpai does not fail to disappoint. In an effort to both help and spend time with Senpai, Nagatoro offers to teach him how to ski. This helps him improve and even impress her a little when he saves a child from running into a tree. Emboldened, Senpai accepts his friend's requests to teach them how to ski, before skiing directly into a wall of snow.
20	8	"Why Don't You Try Bulking Up a Little, Paisen?"; Transliteration: "Paisen-sa Chotto Karada Kitaete mi Nē?" (Japanese: パイセンさ ちょーっと体鍛えてみねぇ？)	Akira Mano	Taku Kishimoto	February 26, 2023
Senpai is shown to be a member of the judo club or possibly as a gym elective at his school along with his friends and his performance is as anyone would expect. At the end of the club meeting, the leader announces that the yearly judo meet is coming up. Senpai thinks about how Nagatoro would be good at something like that only to find that she had vanished from the window she was at. Later, Senpai is shown to have lost his motivation for drawing simple objects and asks Nagatoto to model for him again. She happily accepts and shows off several poses before landing on a martial arts pose that Senpai is impressed at. Once complete her friends enter and comment on the pose, asking if Nagatoro was willing to "try again". When Senpai asks about what they meant, Nagatoto quickly leaves the room saying that she won't tell him. Gamo and Yosshii tell him that he should bulk up and train at Gamo's gym making sure to tell him to go at a time when Nagatoro would be there. Once there he asks her to train him in judo and she accepts. After making the mistake of calling her heavy when she pinned him down, Nagatoro goes back to sparring with Gamo and, despite being smaller, is able to throw her to the ground. On the way home she explains that in judo she would have won with that throw, but MMA has different rules so she still lost. As she starts to go her separate way home, Senpai tells her that he thought her throw was beautiful, which makes her happy and embarrassed as she turns away and runs home.
21	9	"That Is, If You Win at Least Once, Senpai"; Transliteration: "Senpai ga Isshō Demo Dekitara...ne" (Japanese: センパイが一勝でもできたら...ね)	Tōru Hamasaki	Taku Kishimoto	March 5, 2023
Nagatoro is happy to hear Senpai reject the art club president's offer to train him in judo. Senpai and Nagatoro train for the upcoming tournament. On the day of the tournament, Senpai notices Nagatoro is acting strange. He tries to speak with her and learns why she quit judo when she was younger before snapping at him while stating that he does not know many things about her past. While she is walking away Senpai reassures her that she is strong and has a chance to win as long as she tries. Nagatoro teases him over this and exclaims that if he were to win one match she would give him a kiss. Senpai is paired up against a very muscular guy and has a hard time keeping up. However, with the knowledge he gained from Nagatoro he is able to almost pin the guy before the timer runs out. As the opponent had already scored a half-point, Senpai lost by technicality. After the match his opponent compliments his skill, which makes Senpai happy. Nagatoro begins her match against her long-time rival, Orihara, and also has a hard time keeping up with her stamina. As the crowd yells out in support of the rival, Senpai yells his support for Nagatoto, embarrassing but invigorating her into turning the tide of the fight. Unfortunately, Nagatoro flips her rival out-of-bounds and also loses out of a technicality. Now pumped-up and motivated, Nagatoro vows to beat her rival the next time they fight, asking Senpai to give her a kiss if she wins, before running home while blushing.
22	10	"Hachioji-senpai Taught Me a Lot."; Transliteration: "Hachiōji-senpai ni wa Taihen Osewa ni Narimashita" (Japanese: 八王子先輩には大変お世話になりました)	Yasuyuki Fuse	Taku Kishimoto	March 12, 2023
It is the start of the new school year and Senpai realizes he wants to paint Nagatoro again. Upon hearing this, she is greatly pleased and states that she gets to choose the outfit before running into the side room and changing into "Senpai's favorite" swimsuit. After modeling for some time they decide to take a break when Nagatoro begins to complain about having back pain in an effort to get Senpai to give her a massage. Her ploy works and she enjoys some quality teasing time with him. Once they finish, Nagatoro informs Senpai that she will be joining the judo club so she can not only accomplish her goal of defeating her rival, but also earn a kiss from Senpai. This catches Senpai off guard, as he assumed she was only joking about the kiss, and causes him to fumble around the question on whether or not he wants to kiss her when she asks. Just as he is about to give an answer the door to the clubroom swings open and a girl that looks similar to the ex-president walks in requesting to join the club. As it turns out the girl, Hana Sunomiya, was from Senpai's middle school where they were also both members of the Art club and the younger cousin of the president. After an awkward encounter where Sunomiya asks them if they were dating with Nagatoro actually going for it but Senpai saying no, "The Friends" enter and take a frustrated Nagatoro to the judo club where she is clearly distracted. Gamo and Orihara comment on Nagatoro's performance and tease her about worrying about her "boyfriend", which she unconvincingly denies. Back in the clubroom, Sunomiya comments on Senpai's painting of Nagatoro, mentioning that he has found his goddess and should pursue her in the name of love. When Senpai is not sure what to do with that information, she lays it out for him by telling him to ask Nagatoro out on a date.
23	11	"Don't You Miss Me, Senpai?"; Transliteration: "Senpai wa Watashi ga Inakute Sabishikunai suka...？" (Japanese: センパイは私がいなくて寂しくないっスか...？)	Akira Mano	Taku Kishimoto	March 19, 2023
As Hana and Senpai leave school they meet up with the ex-president Sana, who was there to drive Hana home on her motorcycle. Hana immediately runs to Sana to tell her all about Senpai's predicament, much to Senpai's worry. Sana simply tells him to follow his heart before driving off. While contemplating his feelings he notices that the judo club was still practicing so he decides to go and wait for Nagatoro. After a bit she runs past him and is caught by surprise. Clearly happy with the idea that he was waiting for her, she teases him a bit before they start to walk home. While walking, Senpai gathers the courage to ask, hypothetically, where Nagatoro would like to go if she had a day off. Caught off-guard and flustered, Nagatoro begins to list places they have no way of going to, causing Senpai to become discouraged. Noticing this, she quickly re-sets the topic to places nearby. Brought back in, Senpai suggests the movies, which she shoots down as being normal and not stimulating enough, discouraging Senpai again. He lists off two more horrible ideas which cause the conversation to stagnate and awkwardness to set in as they reach the point where they go their separate ways. After a disappointing goodbye Senpai begins walking and notices a construction sign with a penguin on it. Finally putting two and two together for once, he realizes that all of Nagatoro's ideas involve animals. Running back to the intersection they parted ways, he yells to Nagatoro, asking if she would like to go to the aquarium. While fully expecting Nagatoro to tease him about asking her to go somewhere with him, she instead very cheerfully accepts with a genuine smile. As the two have their moment, it is revealed that Yosshii and Gamo have overheard the conversation while in hiding. Throughout the next school day the two are noticeably distracted with Hana being very excited that Senpai was able to ask Nagatoro on a date and Gamo and Yosshii thinking that Nagatoro is planning on stealing Senpai virginity. The two are shown putting effort into choosing their outfits for the date, with Nagatoro's older sister trying to convince her to wear something sexy. On the day of the date a very nervous Senpai and a genuinely happy Nagatoro met up at a train station to head to the aquarium. It is also shown that Gamo and Yosshii are following them in an attempt to save Senpai's virginity while Hana and Sana are following Gamo and Yosshii to stop them from getting in the way of love.
24	12	"Wanna Do Something to Make It Not a Dry Run?"; Transliteration: "Jā...Honban ni Fusawashī Kotoshi Chaimasu?" (Japanese: じゃあ...本番にふさわしいことしちゃいます？)	Yū Takahashi	Taku Kishimoto	March 26, 2023
On the train, Nagatoro teases Senpai as per usual and announces that this date will be a practice run for him just in case he somehow manages to get a real date in the future. She immediately begins deducting points from him for various things as the camera pans over to Gamo and Yosshii hiding at the other end of the train car discussing with themselves as to why they need to save Senpai's virginity, stating that he needs more time to bloom and not wither away after firing his laser once. Beyond the train, Hana and Sana are seen on a motorcycle stating why they must stop the other two for the sake of love. At the aquarium, Nagatoro has a great time while Senpai, still nervous and unsure if the date is real or not, notices how close Nagatoro is in terms of approachability and calmness. Eventually, however, Nagatoro realizes that the aquarium is full of couples holding hands and wants to as well. She tells Senpai that there is something he should be noticing to which he responds by guessing that she is hungry, bored, or needs to use the bathroom, losing points with each failed guess. Ironically enough though, he notices the four girls that have been following them and, in an effort to escape them, grabs Nagatoro's hand and runs away with her while greatly pleasing Nagatoro in the process. At the food court, the two get some ice cream with Nagatoro revealing that she really likes spicy food and Senpai admitting that he does not when She teases him about licking some of her wasabi flavored ice cream for an indirect kiss. When he does not go for it she goes in to lick his vanilla ice cream, but they accidentally end up hitting the cones together resulting in the ice creams indirectly kissing. After finishing their food they go to see a dolphin show where Senpai takes notice of the other couples there and has doubts that he deserves to be there with Nagatoro, who is having a wonderful time. All of a sudden there is a big splash from the dolphin tank and he jumps in the way to shield Nagatoro from the water, surprising and impressing her to the point of indirectly calling him cool. Afterwards, they continue to enjoy the aquarium and Nagatoro is shown to have won a penguin plushie in a raffle. Eventually, they leave the aquarium and make their way to the beach nearby where Nagatoro lists off Senpai's points for the date, which quickly becomes -450 points. This leaves Senpai visibly discouraged and causes a flustered Nagatoro to mention that he did do some great things such as holding her hand and blocking the water from splashing her, thus bringing up his points to 50... out of 1000 points. She then teases him some more, offering to help him practice more in the future if she had the time. When Senpai asks if she got any good practice out of the date, she adamantly admits that it was a real date to her. This causes Senpai to state that he also saw it as a real date. Wanting to finalize the date in some way, Nagatoro gives Senpai two options, they could either hug or kiss. Senpai, being so far out of his element at this point that he cannot fathom a kiss, but also truly wanting to be with Nagatoro, says they should hug. She joyously accepts and opens her arms to him. By this time, the other girls had found them from a distance and began to move in to disrupt them, reaching Senpai and Nagatoro just before they could embrace. This causes Senpai and Nagatoro to become extremely embarrassed and not go through with it. The next day at school, Nagatoro is seen with Sakura as the latter tries to convince Nagatoro to forgive Gamo and Yosshii, who are keeping a large distance between them and her. Nagatoro eventually accepts and they all run to the art club where they overhear Hana trying to force feed Senpai her own home-made lunch as an apology for interrupting the date. This greatly annoys Nagatoro who tries to convince Hana that she will be providing lunch for Senpai so she does not need to bring apology lunches anymore. However, Senpai rejects Nagatoro's offer, much to the dismay of all the girls in the room, due to her already needing to get up early for judo. He then saves himself by offering to bring Nagatoro lunch on the days she has early judo and she can bring him lunches on days she does not, regaining the respect of the girls in the room and greatly pleasing Nagatoro. Later on the way home, Nagatoro asks Senpai if he would like to finish where they left off on their date. Senpai, embarrassed but determined, agrees and the two finally happily embrace with Nagatoro granting one final tease.

== Reception ==
Oricon Japanese comic rankings
Volume No.	Peak rank	Notes	Refs
2	34	1 week	
3	20	1 week	
4	24	2 weeks	

Don't Toy with Me, Miss Nagatoro has received overall positive reviews. The first few chapters have been criticized for Nagatoro's teasing, with reviewers comparing it to bullying. However, the art and character development has been well received, with Nagatoro showing a softer side as the series progresses.

Don't Toy with Me, Miss Nagatoro has also been compared to other works in the "teasing" genre, such as Teasing Master Takagi-san and Uzaki-chan Wants to Hang Out!.

In November 2019, the manga had over one million copies in circulation in Japan, and surpassed 1.2 million in mid-July 2020. As of October 2022, the manga had over 3.3 million copies in circulation.

The series' protagonists were featured in a cameo in Kaguya-sama: Love Is War - Dōjin Edition. Nanashi has also drawn a collaboration manga with Azu's Magical Sempai.

== Works cited ==
- "Ch." is shortened form for chapter and refers to a chapter number of the Don't Toy with Me, Miss Nagatoro manga.
- "Ep." is shortened form for episode and refers to an episode number of the Don't Toy with Me, Miss Nagatoro anime series.
