= Anyway, I'm Falling in Love with You =

Japanese manga series

- First tankōbon volume cover, featuring Kizuki Hazawa

どうせ、恋してしまうんだ。 (Dōse, Koishite Shimaunda)
- Genre: Coming-of-age; Romance
- Manga
- Written by: Haruka Mitsui
- Published by: Kodansha
- English publisher: NA: Kodansha USA
- Magazine: Nakayoshi
- Original run: November 2, 2020 – February 3, 2026
- Volumes: 14
- Anime television series
- Directed by: Junichi Yamamoto
- Written by: Yū Murai; Nagisa Nario
- Music by: Keiji Inai
- Studio: Typhoon Graphics
- Licensed by: Crunchyroll (streaming); SEA: Medialink
- Original network: TBS, BS11
- Original run: January 10, 2025 – March 27, 2026
- Episodes: 24
- icon

Anyway, I'm Falling in Love with You (Japanese: どうせ、恋してしまうんだ。, Hepburn: Dōse, Koishite Shimaunda) is a Japanese manga series written and illustrated by Haruka Mitsui. It was serialized in Kodansha's shōjo manga magazine Nakayoshi from November 2020 to February 2026, with its chapters collected in 14 tankōbon volumes. An anime television series adaptation produced by Typhoon Graphics aired from January to March 2025. A second season aired from January to March 2026.

== Plot ==
In 2020, Mizuho Nishino, an aspiring manga artist, lives in a neighborhood in Koigahama with her four childhood friends: Kizuki, Shin, Airu, and Shuugo. However, on her 17th birthday, her life begins to change around her. On top of school events getting cancelled due to a pandemic, her relationships with her four friends change when Kizuki declares his love for her. Though Mizuho wants their friendships to remain the same, she is forced to confront her feelings as her friends begin to reveal who they are in love with.

Part of the narrative is also interspersed with Mizuho celebrating her 27th birthday in 2030, 10 years in the future, slowly revealing the career paths of each character, as well as Mizuho's current relationship with each of her childhood friends.

== Characters ==
Mizuho Nishino (西野 水帆, Nishino Mizuho)
Voiced by: Sakura Shinfuku (Japanese); Maganda Marie (English)
Kizuki Hazawa (羽沢 輝月, Hazawa Kizuki)
Voiced by: Kazuki Ura (Japanese); Mauricio Ortiz-Segura (English)
Shin Kashiwagi (柏木 深, Kashiwagi Shin)
Voiced by: Sion Yoshitaka (Japanese); Wyatt Baker (English)
Airu Izumi (和泉 藍, Izumi Airu)
Voiced by: Shōya Chiba (Japanese); Belsheber Rusape Jr. (English)
Shuugo Hoshikawa (星川 周吾, Hoshikawa Shūgo)
Voiced by: Satoshi Inomata (Japanese); Tom Laflin (English)
Ryōsuke Saitō (斉藤 涼介, Saitō Ryōsuke)
Voiced by: Yūto Uemura (Japanese); Ethan Connor Condon (English)
Chika Kurashiki (倉敷 千夏, Kurashiki Chika)
Voiced by: Azusa Tadokoro (Japanese); Vanessa Benoit (English)
Tougo Hoshikawa (星川 透吾, Hoshikawa Tōgo)
Voiced by: Yūichirō Umehara
Manami Shiraishi (白石 真波, Shiraishi Manami)
Voiced by: Kaori Nazuka
Kuroda (黒田)
Voiced by: Mayuko Kazama

== Media ==
=== Manga ===
Written and illustrated by Haruka Mitsui, Anyway, I'm Falling in Love with You ran in Kodansha's shōjo manga magazine Nakayoshi from November 2, 2020, to February 3, 2026. Kodansha has collected its chapters into individual tankōbon volumes. Fourteen volumes were released from March 12, 2021, to March 13, 2026.

In North America, the manga has been licensed for English digital release by Kodansha USA. In July 2023, Kodansha USA announced that they would start releasing the manga in print in 2024.

==== Volumes ====
No.	Original release date	Original ISBN	English release date	English ISBN
1	March 12, 2021	978-4-06-522664-3	November 16, 2021 (digital); March 5, 2024 (print)	978-1-63699-466-6 (digital); 979-8-88877-115-0 (print)
Episode 1: "2020"; Episode 2: "When I Kissed My Childhood Friend"; Episode 3: "I'm By Your Side"; Episode 4: "An Unforgettable Summer"
2	July 13, 2021	978-4-06-524090-8	December 21, 2021 (digital); May 7, 2024 (print)	978-1-63699-524-3 (digital); 979-8-88877-116-7 (print)
Episode 5: "Fever Girl"; Episode 6: "A Secret"; Episode 7: "Ever Since Then"; Episode 8: "The Night We Saw Fireworks"
3	November 12, 2021	978-4-06-525900-9	March 31, 2022 (digital); July 2, 2024 (print)	978-1-68491-195-0 (digital); 979-8-88877-117-4 (print)
Episode 9: "Poolside"; Episode 10: "Friends"; Episode 11: "Morning After"; Episode 12: "Confession"
4	April 13, 2022	978-4-06-527551-1	September 22, 2022 (digital); September 3, 2024 (print)	978-1-68491-452-4 (digital); 979-8-88877-118-1 (print)
Episode 13: "A New Season"; Episode 14: "Rivals"; Episode 15: "Three-Way Date"; Episode 16: "Courage"
5	August 12, 2022	978-4-06-528485-8	March 21, 2023 (digital); January 7, 2025 (print)	978-1-68491-709-9 (digital); 979-8-88877-119-8 (print)
Episode 17: "Sign of Spring"; Episode 18: "The Rules of Unrequited Love"; Episode 19: "Undelivered Feelings"; Episode 20: "When the Rain Stops"; Special Story
6	March 13, 2023	978-4-06-530836-3	July 18, 2023 (digital); March 4, 2025 (print)	979-8-88933-043-1 (digital); 979-8-88877-120-4 (print)
Episode 21: "September 26, 2020, 10:53 PM"; Episode 22: "The Two After School"; Episode 23: "Secret Place"; Episode 24: "The Dream Goes On"
7	October 13, 2023	978-4-06-533178-1	March 19, 2024 (digital); May 6, 2025 (print)	979-8-88933-413-2 (digital); 979-8-88877-321-5 (print)
Episode 25: "Fireworks a Decade Later"; Episode 26: "Christmas Eve"; Episode 27: "The Snow, and a Kiss"; Episode 28: "The Shape of Love"; "Shin's Hated Type"; "The Secret Behind Airu's Smile"; "Shuugo's Plan"; "Kizuki's Wish"
8	March 13, 2024	978-4-06-534969-4	July 16, 2024 (digital); September 2, 2025 (print)	979-8-88933-623-5 (digital); 979-8-88877-442-7 (print)
Episode 29: "Another Love"; Episode 30: "Confession"; Episode 31: "Dawn Break"; Episode 32: "Once More"; Bonus Short
9	August 9, 2024	978-4-06-536623-3	February 25, 2025 (digital); December 30, 2025 (print)	979-8-89478-375-8 (digital); 979-8-88877-508-0 (print)
Episode 33: "A Miracle"; Episode 34: "Graduation"; Episode 35: "Happy Birthday"; Episode 36: "Memories That Stick With You"
10	January 10, 2025	978-4-06-538117-5	September 23, 2025 (digital); March 24, 2026 (print)	979-8-89478-685-8 (digital); 979-8-88877-651-3 (print)
Episode 37: "I've Always Loved You"; Episode 38: "A Heart Underwater"; Episode 39: "No Regrets"; Episode 40: "Making a Statement"
11	March 13, 2025	978-4-06-538801-3	January 27, 2026 (digital)	979-8-89478-843-2
Episode 41: "What If..."; Episode 42: "Blaze of Blue"; Episode 43: "What I Couldn't Bear to Lose"; Special Side Story: "Shin's Secret"
12	August 12, 2025	978-4-06-540446-1	—	—
Episode 44: "Resolve"; Episode 45: "A Love This Special"; Episode 46: "Seaside Special"; Episode 47: "Departure"
13	January 13, 2026	978-4-06-542097-3	—	—
Episode 48: "Soulmate"; Episode 49: "In a Dream"; Episode 50: "Reunited"; Episode 51: "Where This Love Will Lead Us"
14	March 13, 2026	978-4-06-542835-1	—	—
Episode 52: "A Thunderous Night"; Episode 53: "Their Own Paths Forward"; The Final Episode: "Living in the Moment"; Special Story

=== Anime ===
An anime television series adaptation was announced in February 2024. It is produced by Typhoon Graphics and directed by Junichi Yamamoto, with series composition by Yū Murai and Nagisa Nario, characters designed by Io Shiiba, and music composed by Keiji Inai. The series aired from January 10 to March 28, 2025, on TBS and BS11. (Note: TBS listed the series premiere on January 9 at 25:28, which is effectively January 10 at 1:28 a.m. JST.) The opening theme song is "Make it Count" by INI, and the ending theme song is "Negaigoto" (願いごと; lit. 'Wish') by Marcy. Crunchyroll is streaming the series. Medialink licensed the series in Southeast Asia for streaming on its Ani-One Asia's YouTube channel.

Following the airing of the final episode, a second season was announced. It aired from January 9 to March 27, 2026. (Note: TBS listed the season premiere on January 8 at 25:28, which is effectively January 9 at 1:28 a.m. JST.) The opening theme song is "L to R" (LとR; lit. 'L and R'), performed by Me:I, and the ending theme song is "Hatsukoi" (初恋; lit. 'First Love'), performed by Berry Meet.

==== Episodes ====
===== Season 1 (2025) =====
No. overall	No. in season	Title	Directed by (Note: Production staff information is taken from the ending credits of each episode.)	Written by	Storyboarded by	Original release date
1	1	"An Awful Birthday"; Transliteration: "Saiaku no Tanjōbi" (Japanese: 最悪の誕生日)	Kiyoshi Murayama & Ryo Yasumura	Yu Murai	Junichi Yamamoto	January 10, 2025
2	2	"I'll Be By Your Side"; Transliteration: "Soba ni Iru yo" (Japanese: そばにいるよ)	Kiyoshi Murayama & Kotaro Sasaki	Yu Murai	Tomoya Takashima & Kuma Fukurō	January 17, 2025
3	3	"Warmth"; Transliteration: "Taion" (Japanese: 体温)	Yamaki Midori	Nagisa Naruo	Yutaka (Konkichi)	January 24, 2025
4	4	"Fireworks for the Future"; Transliteration: "Mirai e no Hanabi" (Japanese: 未来への花火)	Yu Yabuuchi	Yu Murai	Romano Fuhiga	January 31, 2025
5	5	"How to Be Together Forever"; Transliteration: "Zutto Issho ni Iru Hōhō" (Japanese: ずっと一緒にいる方法)	Sasaki Kotaro	Nagisa Naruo	Naoki Ao	February 7, 2025
6	6	"I Don't Want to be Just Friends"; Transliteration: "Tomodachi ja Irarenai" (Japanese: 友だちじゃいられない)	Kure Tadao	Yu Murai	Junichi Sakata	February 14, 2025
7	7	"Playing Nice"; Transliteration: "Nakayoshi Gokko" (Japanese: なかよしごっこ)	Nakamura Kinsei	Nagisa Naruo	Ichizo Kobayashi	February 21, 2025
8	8	"The Shape of One-Sided Love"; Transliteration: "Kataomoi no Katachi" (Japanese: 片想いのかたち)	Ankoku Kumaneko	Nagisa Naruo	Yutaka Kagawa	February 28, 2025
9	9	"The Times I Spent With You"; Transliteration: "Kimi to Ita Jikan" (Japanese: 君といた時間)	Harume Kosaka	Nagisa Naruo	Harume Kosaka	March 7, 2025
10	10	"Impulse"; Transliteration: "Shōdō" (Japanese: 衝動)	Fumihiro Ueno	Yu Murai	Romano Fugiha	March 14, 2025
11	11	"Things That Change"; Transliteration: "Kawatteiku Mono" (Japanese: 変わっていくもの)	Sasako Kotaro	Nagisa Naruo	Ichizo Kobayashi	March 21, 2025
12	12	"Neverending Dream"; Transliteration: "Owaranai Yume" (Japanese: 終わらない夢)	Yūma Imura	Yu Murai	Romano Fugiha	March 28, 2025

===== Season 2 (2026) =====
No. overall	No. in season	Title	Directed by	Written by	Storyboarded by	Original release date
13	1	"The Fireworks Ten Years Later"; Transliteration: "Jūnen-go no Hanabi" (Japanese: 10年後の花火)	Yūji Kanzaki	Yūma Imura	Nagisa Naruo	January 9, 2026
14	2	"I Can't Give Up"; Transliteration: "Akirame Rarenai" (Japanese: 諦められない)	Junichi Yamamoto	Sasako Kotaro	Junichi Yamamoto	January 16, 2026
15	3	"My True Self"; Transliteration: "Hontō no Jibun" (Japanese: 本当の自分)	Masato Uchibori	Yuki Tanihata	Romano Fugiha	January 23, 2026
16	4	"A Miracle"; Transliteration: "Kiseki" (Japanese: キセキ)	Shunsuke Fujii	Yūma Imura	Kenji Setou	January 30, 2026
17	5	"Feelings That Won't Go Away"; Transliteration: "Kienai Omoi" (Japanese: 消えない思い)	Yūji Kanzaki	Sasako Kotaro	Nagisa Naruo	February 6, 2026
18	6	"I've Liked You This Whole Time"; Transliteration: "Zutto Suki datta" (Japanese: ずっと好きだった)	Shogo Shimizu	Yuki Tanihata	Shinichi Watanabe	February 13, 2026
19	7	"I Don't Want to Have Any Regrets"; Transliteration: "Kōkai Shitakunai" (Japanese: 後悔したくない)	Aya Kobayashi	Yūma Imura	Aya Kobayashi	February 20, 2026
20	8	"I Don't Want to Lose You"; Transliteration: "Ushinatakunai" (Japanese: 失いたくない)	Yoshihiro Takamoto	Sasako Kotaro	Romano Fugiha	February 27, 2026
21	9	"The Declaration"; Transliteration: "Sengen" (Japanese: 宣言)	Yukio Nishimoto	Yuki Tanihata	Yukio Nishimoto	March 6, 2026
22	10	"Something I've Been Meaning to Say"; Transliteration: "Zutto Iitakatta koto" (Japanese: ずっと言いたかったこと)	Junichi Yamamoto	Sasako Kotaro	Junichi Yamamoto	March 13, 2026
23	11	"The Proposal"; Transliteration: "Puropōzu" (Japanese: プロポーズ)	Ryō Ōkubo	Sasako Kotaro	Nagisa Naruo	March 20, 2026
24	12	"Anyway, I'm Falling in Love with You"; Transliteration: "Dōse, Koishite Shimaunda" (Japanese: どうせ、恋してしまうんだ。)	Masato Uchibori & Shunsuke Fujii	Yūma Imura	Romano Fugiha	March 27, 2026

=== Stage play ===
A stage play adaptation ran in Tokyo's Theater Milano-Za from February 6–16, 2025, and in Osaka's Cool Japan Park Osaka TT Hall from February 19–25. The stage play starred Manami Igashira as Mizuho Nishino, Leo Nagaoka as Kizuki Hazawa, Rikuto Ura as Shin Kashiwagi, Rion Ouchi as Airu Izumi, and Yoshitaka Taro as Shugo Hoshikawa.

== Reception ==
The series had over 1.7 million copies in circulation by August 2025.

== See also ==
- I Fell in Love After School, another manga series by the same author
