= I Fell in Love After School =

Japanese manga series

- First tankōbon volume cover

放課後、恋した。 (Hōkago, Koi Shita)
- Genre: Romance, sports
- Manga
- Written by: Haruka Mitsui
- Published by: Kodansha
- English publisher: NA: Kodansha USA
- Imprint: KC Dessert
- Magazine: Dessert
- Original run: January 24, 2017 – April 24, 2020
- Volumes: 8

I Fell in Love After School (放課後、恋した。, Hōkago, Koi Shita) is a Japanese manga series written and illustrated by Haruka Mitsui. It was serialized in Kodansha's shōjo manga magazine Dessert from January 2017 to April 2020.

== Synopsis ==
Kao is a girl that lacks a social life, hobbies, or interests. So her brother pushes her to become the manager of the boy's volleyball club. After joining, she's tasked to recruit Nagisa Kuze, a talented student. When she approaches Kuze, he rejects her, but when she catches a glimpse of him, she refuses to give up on recruiting him.

== Publication ==
Written and illustrated by Haruka Mitsui, I Fell in Love After School was serialized in Kodansha's shōjo manga magazine Dessert from January 24, 2017, to April 24, 2020. The series' chapters were collected into eight tankōbon volumes from June 13, 2017, to June 11, 2020.

During their Anime NYC 2019 panel, Kodansha USA announced that they licensed the series for English digital publication.

No.	Original release date	Original ISBN	North American release date	North American ISBN
1	June 13, 2017	978-4-06-365913-9	February 25, 2020	978-1-64-659243-2
1. "Club Application"; 2. "A Promise"; 3. "Q&A"; 4. "The Two's Saturday"
2	November 13, 2017	978-4-06-510416-3	March 24, 2020	978-1-64-659270-8
5. "Wishes"; 6. "No Honorific"; 7. "I Want to Be By Your Side"; 8. "The Start of Summer Training Camp"
3	March 13, 2018	978-4-06-511083-6	April 28, 2020	978-1-64-659348-4
9. "Profile"; 10. "Fireworks Night"; 11. "Unyielding Heart"; 12. "An Ocean-Blue Vacation"
4	October 12, 2018	978-4-06-513172-5	May 26, 2020	978-1-64-659373-6
13. "Fake"; 14. "The Distance to Kuze-kun"; 15. "Rain of Tears"; 16. "Only You"
5	March 13, 2019	978-4-06-514964-5	June 23, 2020	978-1-64-659399-6
17. "Your Eyes on Me"; 18. "I Want to Do My Best"; 19. "Preparing for the Culture Festival"; 20. "The Culture Festival"; Extra: "Onii-chan's Secret"
6	August 9, 2019	978-4-06-516718-2	July 28, 2020	978-1-64-659607-2
21. "The Night of the Closing Party"; 22. "I'm Serious"; 23. "Only Look at Me"; 24. "The Day Before the Match"
7	January 10, 2020	978-4-06-518228-4	August 25, 2020	978-1-64-659655-3
25. "The Closest to You"; 26. "Rivals"; 27. "You're the First"; 28. "No More Hesitating"
8	June 11, 2020	978-4-06-519754-7	June 29, 2021	978-1-63-699169-6
29. "I Love You"; 30. "Club Activities, Love, and Friendship"; 31. "The Holy Night"; 32. "My First Blue Spring"

== See also ==
- Anyway, I'm Falling in Love with You, another manga series by the same author
