= Caladrius (video game) =

2013 video game

- Developer: MOSS
- Publishers: MOSS; H2 Interactive (PS4, PC)
- Director: Jin Hoshino
- Producer: Toshinobu Komazawa
- Programmers: Motomi Hirano; Satoshi Noguchi; Shigeru Tsuchiya; Takayuki Hayashi
- Artist: Suzuhito Yasuda (character)
- Writer: Kuon Kagura
- Composers: Manabu Namiki; Yoshimi Kudo; Azusa Chiba
- Platforms: Arcade, Xbox 360, PlayStation 3, PlayStation 4, Microsoft Windows, Nintendo Switch
- Release: Xbox 360: JP: April 25, 2013; NA: September 4, 2015; EU: September 4, 2015; Arcade: JP: September 30, 2013; PlayStation 3: JP: August 28, 2014; PlayStation 4: WW: August 9, 2016; Microsoft Windows: WW: January 12, 2017; Nintendo Switch: WW: July 19, 2019
- Genre: Shoot 'em up
- Modes: Single-player, multiplayer
- Arcade system: Sega RingEdge 2

Caladrius (カラドリウス, Karadoriusu) is a scrolling shooter developed and published by MOSS, first released on April 25, 2013 for the Xbox 360 in Japan. It was later released digitally in North America and Europe on September 4, 2015. After its console debut, Caladrius was ported to arcades under the name Caladrius AC, adding extra game modes and supporting Sega's ALL.Net system. The game was released for the PlayStation 3 under the name Caladrius Blaze on August 14, 2014 exclusively in Japan. This version added extra characters, stages, and game modes. The updated version was also released internationally for the PlayStation 4 on August 9, 2016, Microsoft Windows on January 12, 2017, and Nintendo Switch on July 19, 2019, all of which were published by H2 Interactive.

== Gameplay ==
In Caladrius, there are normal attacks and there are elemental attacks. There are three types of element gauges, and when an elemental attack is used it depletes one of the gauges, but it is restored over time or by acquiring element cores in the stage. However, element cores are temporary, and their effectiveness decreases over time. Ether chips are generated when players damage enemies with elemental attacks and fill the ether gauge. Ether chips strengthen elemental attacks. In addition to regular bombs, there is also an "element burst" that can only be used when all element gauges are over 50%. Furthermore, there is a system called "Shame Break'' that damages the passenger's body and clothing by damaging the aircraft, and is activated if the opponent's health gauge is emptied within 30 seconds. The player character is also subject to Shame Break, which will be activated if they have 30 or more medals when defeated.

== Story ==
Origins and Inspiration detail the formation of MOSS in 2005 by former Raiden development staff from Seibu Kaihatsu, and how their experience influenced the creation of "Caladrius."

Design Philosophy mention the collaboration with character designer Suzuhito Yasuda, known for works like "Durarara!!" and "Devil Survivor," and how his involvement shaped the game's aesthetic.

=== Characters ===
- Alex Martin
- Kei Percival
- Maria Therese Bloomfield
- Sophia Fulcanelli
- Nightmare of the Lilith
- Caladrius
- Cecilia N. Albright
- Noah Twinning
- Nina Twinning
- Layis Naje

=== Antagonists ===
- Iris A. Baladin
- Eleanor Riegl
- Milia Marivene
- Islay J. Pulsion
- Graham G. Baladin
- Beelzebub

== Reception ==
Famitsu magazine scored Caladrius a 31 out of 40 and Caladrius Blaze a 29 out of 40.
