= Farming Life in Another World =

Japanese light novel series

- First light novel volume cover, featuring Lulucy Ru, Tia (front), and Hiraku Machio (back)

異世界のんびり農家 (Isekai Nonbiri Nōka)
- Genre: Fantasy; Isekai
- Novel series
- Written by: Kinosuke Naito
- Published by: Shōsetsuka ni Narō
- Original run: December 29, 2016 – present
- Light novel
- Written by: Kinosuke Naito
- Illustrated by: Yasumo
- Published by: Enterbrain
- Original run: October 30, 2017 – present
- Volumes: 21 + 1 extra
- Manga
- Written by: Kinosuke Naito
- Illustrated by: Yasuyuki Tsurugi
- Published by: Fujimi Shobo
- English publisher: NA: One Peace Books
- Magazine: Monthly Dragon Age
- Original run: November 9, 2017 – present
- Volumes: 17
- Manga

Isekai Nonbiri Nōka no Nichijō
- Illustrated by: Yuji
- Published by: Fujimi Shobo
- Magazine: Monthly Dragon Age
- Original run: July 8, 2022 – present
- Volumes: 8
- Anime television series
- Directed by: Ryōichi Kuraya
- Produced by: Momo Hiraki; Yuuichirou Takahashi; Yuriko Yamamoto; Masataka Yamaguchi
- Written by: Touko Machida (S1); Ryōichi Kuraya (S2)
- Music by: Yasuharu Takanashi; Johannes Nilsson
- Studio: Zero-G
- Licensed by: Sentai Filmworks
- Original network: AT-X, TV Tokyo, BS TV Tokyo
- Original run: January 6, 2023 – June 22, 2026
- Episodes: 24
- icon

Farming Life in Another World (Japanese: 異世界のんびり農家, Hepburn: Isekai Nonbiri Nōka) is a Japanese light novel series written by Kinosuke Naito and illustrated by Yasumo. It has been published online via the user-generated novel publishing website Shōsetsuka ni Narō since December 2016. It was later acquired by Enterbrain, who has released 21 volumes since October 2017.

A manga adaptation illustrated by Yasuyuki Tsurugi has been serialized in Fujimi Shobo's shōnen manga magazine Monthly Dragon Age since November 2017, with its chapters collected in 17 tankōbon volumes as of September 2026. An anime television series adaptation produced by Zero-G aired from January to March 2023. A second season aired from April to June 2026.

== Plot ==
During the final years of his life, Hiraku Machio remained confined to a hospital bed with a terminal illness until he finally passed away. Taking pity on the unfair life he lived, a god decides to reincarnate Hiraku in another world where he can live as he pleases. Wanting to try farming in this new life, he is bestowed with an all-in-one "Almighty Farming Tool" that can transform into any useful implement he wishes. Hiraku is then transported to a forest seemingly far from civilization. Here, he plans to build and farm everything from scratch—gradually developing the lifeless area into a thriving new society.

== Characters ==
=== Great Tree Village ===
The first village that was ever built in the Forest of Death. Hiraku Machio is the village's first settler, but when more people started moving in, more and more houses and fields were made and Hiraku eventually became the village's mayor. The village's name came from the large tree that grows in the middle of it.

Hiraku Machio (街尾 火楽, Machio Hiraku)
Voiced by: Atsushi Abe (Japanese); Blake Shepard (English)
He is the main protagonist and Great Tree Village's mayor and first settler; in his past life, he was a Japanese middle-aged office worker who was being forcefully overworked at his workplace to where it led to him having health problems and being in and out of the hospital until he died on his deathbed. Hiraku has endless stamina, which his wives fear at times; he enjoys intimacy a bit too much. While starting out on his own, Hiraku is granted the Omnipotent Farming Tool and ends up befriending wolves he named Kuro and Yuki, and the demon spider he named Zabuton, and even accepting humanoid species into his settlement. To some of his confusion, Hiraku ends up with a harem with at least seven wives and children, though some of the elves have children with him solely for continuing their bloodline. Though this is partly due to his wives fearing his stamina thanks to his blessed body; even though Ru and Tia are supernatural, he tires them out.
Lulucy Ru (ルールーシー=ルー, Rūrūshī Rū)
Voiced by: Shino Shimoji (Japanese); Luci Christian (English)
A magic-using female vampire who has an interest in growing medicinal plants. Her size changes with her magic power reserves (which she can recharge by drinking blood); though she willingly stays a loli to deter her husband's massive libido. Ru loves Hiraku's blood, which is premium due to his blessed healthy body. The "Vampire Princess," as she is also known, is Hiraku's first wife and the mother of their son Alfred.
Tia (ティア)
Voiced by: Aya Suzaki (Japanese); Monica Rial (English)
A female angel also known as the "Annihilation Angel" and frenemy/co-wife of Ru who was convinced to stay. She is one of Hiraku's wives, who soon gives birth to his first daughter, Tizel; angels are a mono-sexed race who can only birth more angels. She brought with her the farm's first chickens, as well as the infamous Three Killer Angels and some Lizardmen.
Kuro (クロ)
Voiced by: Hidenobu Kiuchi (Japanese); John Gremillion (English)
Hiraku's pet inferno wolf and leader/grandfather of the pack. Kuro is loyal to his master and even has time dedicated to revealing his POV of becoming domesticated.
Yuki (ユキ)
Kuro's mate, who is also loyal to Hiraku.
Zabuton (ザブトン)
A demon spider who is friendly to Hiraku. She usually alerts him to intruders. She is an old friend of Graffalloon, and pulled her out of the way of Hiraku's spear. Some of her offspring serves as part of the village's "army" along with the inferno wolves and also to spot pests in the fields.
Lea (リア, Ria)
Voiced by: Lynn (Japanese); Katelyn Barr (English)
The leader of a group of high-elf girls. Their village was destroyed by humans in a war 200 years ago, and they've been wandering homeless ever since until Tia brought them to Hiraku's farm. They contribute to the farm by establishing a smithy to make metal tools and weapons, and bringing other technologies such as building construction and baking. In time, she becomes one of Hiraku's wives
Leef (リーフ, Rīfu), Leecott (リコット, Rikotto), Leely (リリ, Riri), Lees (リース, Rīsu), Leezay (リゼ, Rize), Leeta (リタ, Rita)
Voiced by: Hana Shimano (Leef and Leely), Natsuko Abe (Leezay and Leeta), Yuka Hiiragi (Leecott and Lees) (Japanese); Alyssa Marek (Leef), Kira Vincent-Davis (Leely), Hilary Haag (Leezay), Carli Mosier (Leeta), Juliet Simmons (Leecott), Brittney Karbowski (Lees) (English)
Six high-elf girls who move to Hiraku's farm along with Lea.
Lafa (ラファ, Rafa), Lasa (ラーサ, Rāsa), Lalasha (ララーシャ, Rarāsha), Lalu (ラル, Raru), and Lami (ラミ, Rami)
Voiced by: Yuka Hiiragi^{Ep. 4 credits} (Lafa and Lami), Natsuko Abe^{Ep. 4 credits} (Lasa and Lalu), Hana Shimano^{Ep. 4 credits} (Lalasha) (Japanese); Brianna Roberts (Lafa), Olivia Swasey (Lasa), Dominique Meyer^{Ep. 4 credits} (Lalasha), Elissa Cuellar (Lalu), Kara Greenberg (Lami) (English)
The second group of elves to move to Hiraku's farm after Lea's group.
Anne (アン, An)
Voiced by: Yukiyo Fujii (Japanese); Shannon Emerick (English)
She acts as the representative of the ogre maids who came to reside in the village with Flora. She tends to lock Hiraku in his bedroom with a girl whenever she desires him, despite his wails of protest. She becomes one of Hiraku's wives in the future.
Lamulias (ラムリアス, Ramuriasu)
Voiced by: Yūka Aisaka (Japanese); Christina Kelly (English)
One of the ogre maids who became the village's housing manager.
Daga (ダガ)
Voiced by: Haruki Ishiya (Japanese); Jeremy Gee (English)
Daga is the representative of the Lizardmen who came with Tia to the village. He is distinguished from the others by a red bandana given to him by Hiraku, tied to his right upper arm, since Hiraku cannot tell non-mammalian genders apart.
Granmaria (グランマリア, Guranmaria), Kudel (クーデル, Kūderu), and Corone (コローネ, Korōne)
Voiced by: Mayu Yoshioka (Granmaria), Hana Shimano^{Ep. 8 credits} (Kudel), Yūka Aisaka^{Ep. 9 credits} (Corone) (Japanese); Liz Arends (Granmaria), Olivia Swasey (Kudel), Raven Troup (Corone) (English)
A trio of angels who move to Hiraku's village along with Daga's group. They patrol the forest for intruders. They later invite more of their kind to help with the patrols. All three of them soon became Hiraku's wives.
Flora (フローラ, Furōra)
Voiced by: Miyu Tomita (Japanese); Annie Wild (English)
Ru's cousin and a researcher whose interest in the fermentation process made her move to the village. She brought to the farm its first two heads of cattle. Flora is surprised her cousin settled down.
Sena (セナ)
Voiced by: Machico (Japanese); Cat Thomas (English)
Leader of the Beastmen who came to live in the village. She is the daughter of the chief of Howling Village.
Donovan (ドノバン, Donoban)
Voiced by: Kōsei Hirota (Japanese); Louis Gallindo (English)
The leader of elder dwarves who brought to the village the distillation process. He and his group later became the village's resident brewers. They get a reprieve from the workload when the village stops production, wishing to avoid tempting a pregnant Ru.
Lastismoon (ラスティスムーン, Rasutisumūn)
Voiced by: Natsumi Hioka (Japanese); Donna Bella Litton (English)
The daughter of the Gatekeeper Dragon King Dryme who was asked by her mother, White Dragon Graffaloon, to stay in the village as a diplomat. She later becomes in charge of the village's diplomatic relations. She is also known by her monikers "Crazy Dragon" (for her fearsome fiery personality) and "Trader Dragon" (due to the duties she carries out for the village). She also becomes one of Hiraku's wives.
Flowrem Chrome (フラウレム=クローム, Furauremu Kurōmu)
Voiced by: Miho Okasaki (Japanese); Allison Sumrall (English)
She is sent by her father, the Demon General Bizel, to spy on the village's "military might". She ends up staying much longer after seeing what it really is and what its human mayor is capable of doing; seeing Hiraku means no harm and the village is peaceful. She later became the village's accountant and liaison between the village and the Demon Kingdom; and, as an able negotiator, helped establish trading relations with the seaside city of Shashaato. She eventually becomes one of Hiraku's wives.
Hakuren (ハクレン)
Voiced by: Kanae Itō (Japanese); Chelsea McCurdy (English)
Dryme's older sister who ends up becoming the village schoolteacher after stirring some trouble in the village. She is also known by the moniker "Ancient Dragon". She always demands that Lastismoon call her "onee-sama", despite being her aunt. Hakuren later ends up pregnant with Hiraku's child, giving birth to the first of her husband's half-dragon children after becoming one of Hiraku's wives.
Yuri (ユーリ, Yūri)
Voiced by: Reina Kondō (Japanese); Emi Lo (English)
The daughter of the Demon King Galgardo who sent an army of 300 to the Taiju Village to rescue Flowrem, not knowing her real status there after being fed ideas by her three stupid noble friends.
Yuri decides to live and work as a commoner in the village to get more life experience.
Rosalind (ロザリンド, Rozarindo), Roaju (ロアージュ), and Klakkase (クラカッセ, Kurakasse)
Voiced by: Riho Tsuda (Rosalind), Reo Osanai (Roaju), Kotori Koiwai (Klakkase) (Japanese); Brittany Lauda (Rosalind), Maggie Flecknoe (Roaju), Mai Le (Klakkase) (English)
Three noble girls who fed Princess Yuri half-truths about the village, leading to its foiled invasion. They are put in their place after seeing Inferno Wolves and the demon spider Zabuton living there. They stayed behind as Flowrem's village hall assistants (now referred to as the "Town Hall Girls").
Ya (ヤー, Yā)
Voiced by: Riho Sugiyama (Japanese); Genevieve Simmons (English)
The leader of a group of mountain elves who came to the village to stay. She in particular knows where to find the best clay for Hiraku's earthenware. She also has a crush on Hiraku.
Narf
A lizardman who is knowledgeable about minotaurs.
Lattiaci
A clerk who has a relationship with the centaurs. She is Count Drowa's daughter.
Igu
The leader of a group of wood spirits called Nyunyu Daphne, who is stuck in tree stump form. She is the only member of her kind who can talk. Her kind can also turn into plants and would rather remain outside than inside.
Mamu
A beastwoman who seems to be knowledgeable about the Nyunyu Daphne.
Hiterto
Ya's assistant. She grew up with Ya.
Alfred Machio (アルフレート=マチオ, Arufurēto Machio)
Hiruka's first son. He is Ru's child.
Urza
The former leader of the undead. After being defeated by Hakuren, she was turned into a little girl and was adapted by Hiraku. Despite looking intimidating as an undead, she is not really evil. She is believed to be a reincarnated hero queen. She at first dislikes Hakuren, though they eventually bond.
Rashashi
A friend of Flowrem and the Town Hall Girls.
Archfiend
An evil god who was imprisoned by the other gods many years ago using seven stones to seal him. He nearly broke free, but after Hiraku craved the seven stones into statues that resemble the gods, he ended up turning into a harmless cat that Hiraku adopts.
Kamera
Flora's familiar.
Makura
One of Zabuton's offspring.
Harpies
They moved into the forest along with the angels where they help with the patrols.
Clay Doll
An animated clay doll that Urza made with Hakuren’s help. Despite its small size, it is unbelievably powerful.
Jack
One of the human settlers who moves into the Great Tree Village.

=== Great Tree Village 2 ===
The second village that was built in the Forest of Death. The minotaurs live here. The houses that were built here were too small for the adult minotaurs, so Hiraku and his friends had to build bigger houses for them.

Gordon
The leader of the minotaurs who moves to Great Tree Village 2.
Ronana
A female minotaur. Grattz has a crush on her, but the true reason why he wants to marry her is to make peace between his kingdom and the Great Tree Village.

=== Great Tree Village 3 ===
The third village that was built in the Forest of Death. The centaurs live here. The houses are designed to resemble stables.

Gruwald
The leader of a group of centaurs who moves to Great Tree Village 3. She has a rivalry with Hiraku's horse since they both like having Hiraku ride them.

=== Great Tree Village 4 ===
This village is actually the Sun Castle, a flying castle that orbits the forest. After Kuzu swears loyalty to Hiraku, the castle becomes part of the community. A group of demons reside here.

Kuzuden
A demon who rules the Sun Castle, though he is unable to control it until Hiraku helps him gain full ownership of it. He is not all that intimidating. He also becomes a servant to Hiraku after giving him the castle. His nickname is Kuzu.
Gou
A sentient crystal that controls the Sun Castle. It is soon convinced to grant ownership of the castle to Kuzu thanks to Hiraku. It was made by Bell Foguma.
Bell Foguma
The chief assistant of the Sun Castle's ruler and Gou's creator. She was imprisoned by the castle's original ruler and is tasked with gifting the person who will defeat the Demon Lord (Kuzu) with the Sword of the Sun so that she will be free of her position. Hiraku accepts the sword to free her, but also turns the sword to soil as he has no interest in defeating Kuzu. Bell isn't upset by that at all as her job is done.

=== Other characters ===
God (創造神, Sōzōshin)
Voiced by: Show Hayami (Japanese); David Wald (English)
He reincarnated Hiraku as an apology for his unfortunate life and gave him the Omnipotent Farming Tool, but soon realized that there was a mistake in the reincarnation. His daughter punishes him for this, though she soon lifts the punishment after seeing how beneficial Hiraku is.
Goddess of Agriculture (農業神, Nōgyō no Kami)
Voiced by: M.A.O^{Ep. 6 credits} (Japanese); Skyler Sinclair (English)
God's daughter, who had her father punished for giving Hiraku the Omnipotent Farming Tool, which is something that was not meant for mankind to use. After seeing how beneficial Hiraku is, she decided to cancel the punishment.
Bizel (ビーゼル, Bīzeru)
Voiced by: Yōji Ueda (Japanese); Joe Daniels (English)
A Demon General and Flowrem's father, who sent his daughter to spy on the Great Tree Village out of fear of the might of its supposed military, but she ended up staying in the village.
Randan (ランダン)
Voiced by: Shinya Takahashi (Japanese); Mark Laskowski (English)
A general who previously worked for Bizel, who quit out of fear of the Great Tree Village. His repeated resignations earlier in the series became some sort of a running joke; especially since he drove himself nuts with paranoia. He eventually quits after being disgusted by Grattz choosing to quit so he can marry Ronana.
Grattz (グラッツ, Gurattsu)
Voiced by: Akira Sasanuma (Japanese); Adam Gibbs (English)
One of Bizel's generals. He is in love with Ronana, but it is to really secure peace between his kingdom and the Great Tree Village. This leads him to quit his job in favor of love.
Dryme (ドライム, Doraimu)
Voiced by: Tetsu Inada (Japanese); Andrew Love (English)
The Gatekeeper Dragon King who is also Lastismoon's father and Graffaloon's husband. He loves to drink alcohol.
Gucci (グッチ, Gutchi)
Voiced by: Wataru Urata (Japanese); Jack Stansbury (English)
Dryme's butler.
Garf (ガルフ, Garufu)
Voiced by: Ryōsuke Takahashi (Japanese); Brandon Hearnsberger (English)
A beastman who enters a trading business with Hiraku.
Graffaloon (グラッファルーン, Guraffarūn)
Voiced by: Yoko Hikasa (Japanese); Shelley Calene-Black (English)
Lastismoon's mother and Dryme's wife, called the White Dragon. She followed up on Lastismoon's suspicion of Dryme having an affair when he sneaks out of their castle with treasures, which caused her to nearly destroy Taiju Village, leading to Hiraku nearly killing her out of self-defense, if not for Zabuton pulling her out of the spear's way and their butler's timely intervention.
Galgardo (ガルガルド, Garugarudo)
Voiced by: Hozumi Gōda (Japanese); Chris Hutchinson (English)
The Demon King who is concerned about the Great Tree Village. He is very protective of his daughter Yuri.
Vargryfe (ヴァルグライフ, Varuguraifu)
Voiced by: Daisuke Ono (Japanese); Chris Patton (English)
Ru and Flora's grandfather, who strongly admires God as he too was once reincarnated by him. Vargryfe erases his memories every couple of centuries in order to keep his sanity from degrading; ignorance is bliss in an extreme case.
Michael Goroun (マイケル=ゴロウン, Maikeru Gorōn)
Voiced by: Naoki Tatsuta (Japanese); Jay Hickman (English)
Michael is the leader of the Goroun Corporation in the coastal city of Shashaato. As a merchant, he was brought into the village by Flowrem (from existing connections) and started a trading relationship between his city and Taiju Village. While he keeps his cool publicly, Michael is scared witless of the village; though he is amicable with Hiraku.
Junea (ジュネア)
Voiced by: Marie Hatanaka^{Ep. 9 credits} (Japanese); Skyler Sinclair (English)
A lamia who is the chief leader of her warrior tribe.
Count Drowa
Lattiaci's father.
Doze
Hakuren's father and Lastismoon's grandfather.
Fuushu
A priestess who works with Vargryfe.
Domyme
Hakuren and Dryme's brother, who is engaged to Quon.
Quon
A female dragon who is engaged to Domyme. Despite her friendly appearance, she can be a bit intimidating.
Kiabit
An angel who briefly visits the Great Tree Village. She is very stuck up.

== Media ==
=== Light novels ===
Written by Kinosuke Naito, Farming Life in Another World began publication online via the user-generated novel publishing website Shōsetsuka ni Narō on December 29, 2016. The series was later acquired by Enterbrain, who began publishing the novels with illustrations by Yasumo on October 30, 2017. As of June 30, 2026, 21 volumes and a short story collection have been released.

No.	Release date	ISBN
1	October 30, 2017	978-4-04-734848-6
2	March 5, 2018	978-4-04-735018-2
3	July 5, 2018	978-4-04-735221-6
4	November 5, 2018	978-4-04-735393-0
5	April 5, 2019	978-4-04-735590-3
6	September 30, 2019	978-4-04-735733-4
7	April 8, 2020	978-4-04-736018-1
8	August 7, 2020	978-4-04-736205-5
9	December 28, 2020	978-4-04-736455-4
10	April 30, 2021	978-4-04-736521-6 (regular edition); 978-4-04-736522-3 (special edition)
11	September 30, 2021	978-4-04-736796-8
12	March 31, 2022	978-4-04-736983-2
13	August 30, 2022	978-4-04-737139-2
14	December 28, 2022	978-4-04-737310-5
15	April 28, 2023	978-4-04-737433-1
16	October 30, 2023	978-4-04-737662-5
17	June 28, 2024	978-4-04-738029-5
18	January 31, 2025	978-4-04-738198-8
19	August 29, 2025	978-4-04-738537-5
20	February 28, 2026	978-4-04-738715-7
20.5	April 30, 2026	978-4-04-500014-0
21	June 30, 2026	978-4-04-500142-0

=== Manga ===
A manga adaptation illustrated by Yasuyuki Tsurugi initially began serialization online via Kadokawa's ComicWalker website on October 12, 2017. It later began serialization in Fujimi Shobo's shōnen manga magazine Monthly Dragon Age on November 9 of that year. As of September 2026, 17 tankōbon volumes have been released. In September 2020, One Peace Books announced that it had licensed the manga for English publication in print and digital formats.

A spin-off four-panel manga, titled Isekai Nonbiri Nōka no Nichijō (異世界のんびり農家の日常; 'The Everyday Farming Life in Another World'), began serialization in Monthly Dragon Age on July 8, 2022. The first volume was published on January 7, 2023. As of September 2026, eight tankōbon volumes have been released.

No.	Original release date	Original ISBN	English release date	English ISBN
1	March 5, 2018	978-4-04-072604-5	October 28, 2020	978-1-64-273085-2
2	July 5, 2018	978-4-04-072777-6	May 11, 2021	978-1-64-273102-6
3	April 5, 2019	978-4-04-073130-8	November 16, 2021	978-1-64-273126-2
4	September 9, 2019	978-4-04-073320-3	January 11, 2022	978-1-64-273127-9
5	January 9, 2020	978-4-04-073425-5	May 3, 2022	978-1-64-273168-2
6	August 7, 2020	978-4-04-073764-5	June 21, 2022	978-1-64-273169-9
7	March 9, 2021	978-4-04-074010-2	November 9, 2022	978-1-64-273198-9
8	September 9, 2021	978-4-04-074237-3	March 28, 2023	978-1-64-273238-2
9	April 8, 2022	978-4-04-074499-5	November 28, 2023	978-1-64-273291-7
10	January 7, 2023	978-4-04-074827-6	July 16, 2024	978-1-64-273340-2
11	July 7, 2023	978-4-04-075042-2	November 25, 2025	978-1-64-273489-8
12	February 9, 2024	978-4-04-075322-5	June 23, 2026	978-1-64-273548-2
13	September 9, 2024	978-4-04-075584-7	March 2, 2027	978-1-64-273618-2
14	March 7, 2025	978-4-04-075833-6	—	—
15	September 9, 2025	978-4-04-076085-8	—	—
16	March 9, 2026	978-4-04-076310-1	—	—
17	September 9, 2026	978-4-04-076527-3	—	—

==== Spin-off ====
No.	Release date	ISBN
1	January 7, 2023	978-4-04-074829-0
2	February 9, 2024	978-4-04-075323-2
3	February 9, 2024	978-4-04-075324-9
4	September 9, 2024	978-4-04-075585-4
5	March 7, 2025	978-4-04-075834-3
6	September 9, 2025	978-4-04-076086-5
7	March 9, 2026	978-4-04-076311-8
8	September 9, 2026	978-4-04-076528-0

=== Anime ===
An anime adaptation was announced on March 29, 2022. It was later revealed to be a television series produced by Zero-G and directed by Ryōichi Kuraya, with scripts written by Touko Machida, character designs handled by Yoshiko Saitō, who also serves as chief animation director, and music composed by Yasuharu Takanashi and Johannes Nilsson. The series aired from January 6 to March 24, 2023, on AT-X and other networks. The opening theme song is "Flower Ring" by Shino Shimoji and Aya Suzaki, and the ending theme song is "Feel the Winds" by VTuber Hizuki Yui. Sentai Filmworks licensed the series for streaming on Hidive. At Anime Boston 2023, Sentai Filmworks announced that the series would receive an English dub, which premiered on June 8, 2023.

A second season was announced on August 24, 2025. Ryōichi Kuraya directed the season and wrote the scripts. It aired from April 6 to June 22, 2026. For the second season, the opening theme song is "It's a Beautiful Story" by Shino Shimoji and Aya Suzaki, and the ending theme song is "Sunny Steps" by Hizuki Yui.

==== Season 1 ====
No. overall	No. in season	Title	Directed by (Note: Information is taken from the ending credits of each episode.)	Written by	Storyboarded by	Original release date
1	1	"The Almighty Farming Tool"; Transliteration: "Bannō Nōgu" (Japanese: 万能農具)	Ryōichi Kuraya	Ryōichi Kuraya	Ryōichi Kuraya	January 6, 2023
Village founder Hiraku Machio awakens from a dream of dying from a terminal illness in his past life then goes about his normal day running his farming village populated by demi-humans. In the past, the God of Earth chose to reincarnate Hiraku as an apology for his unusually harsh life and painful terminal illness. Hiraku asks to reincarnate as a farmer as he loved watching farming shows in the hospital. God gifts him a powerful new body and the magic Omnipotent Farming Tool, which can summon any tool he requires and can be used without growing tired. Awakening in a forest far from civilization, Hiraku selects the largest tree as the site for his farm and with the Tool is able to construct a well, build a camp and dig his first field. To his amazement, the Tool causes crops to begin sprouting without planting seeds first. After a few weeks, he rescues a pair of wolves he names Kuro and Yuki who gives birth on the same night to four puppies. Adopting all the wolves to protect the farm from monsters, Hiraku eventually begins harvesting his first crop. Elsewhere, a young traveling woman hears tales of the monster-filled Forest of Death, where Hiraku currently lives, and decides to investigate.
2	2	"The First Villager"; Transliteration: "Dai Ichi Murabito" (Japanese: 第一村人)	Ryōichi Kuraya	Ryōichi Kuraya	Ryōichi Kuraya	January 13, 2023
God realizes that he messed up by reincarnating Hiraku in the Forest of Death, but decides to wait until a monster eats him, then reincarnate him again. Hiraku discovers that he can dictate which seeds the Tool sows with his mind and expands his fields. With winter approaching, the wolves fetch a friendly giant spider who weaves warm clothing in exchange for living in Hiraku's tree. Hiraku names the spider Zabuton. Throughout the winter Hiraku struggles with loneliness, especially when the wolf puppies mature and find mates, and even Zabuton reappears with twenty babies. In the spring, Hiraku discovers a weakened vampire child named Ru (the same young girl from before) in the woods, and after donating his blood, she resumes her adult size. Ru is amazed by his crops, which are new to this world, and explains she is a medicinal researcher, but when nobles sent a troublesome person to steal her research, she hid in the forest. They become friendly, and Hiraku asks Ru to move in with him as he feels lonely. Ru agrees, and they become engaged to be married. Hiraku adds a herb garden to his fields to assist in Ru's research. Elsewhere, another young travelling woman is looking for the Forest of Death.
3	3	"More and More New Roommates"; Transliteration: "Dōkyonin Zokuzoku" (Japanese: 同居人 続々)	Takeshi Shiga	Touko Machida	Daiji Iwanaga	January 20, 2023
An angel named Tia, the girl from the previous episode, appears searching for Ru and is surprised to find her married to Hiraku. Tia reveals that Ru has a bounty on her after she destroyed a town, though Ru insists it was justified since a noble kept her imprisoned there. Ru abruptly invites Tia to live with them, and after experiencing their farming life, she takes to it like a natural. The wolves have even more puppies, so Hiraku expands the farm to give them more space. Half of Zabuton's babies leave to find their own territory, but the others live on Hiraku's fruit trees. Needing workers, Tia invites seven girls to the farm, members of an almost extinct high elf clan who need a permanent home to rebuild their population. Due to their long lifespans, the elves have multiple skills, including construction, blacksmithing and baking. Hiraku helps them build a new home. Hiraku worries that the Demon Lord who controls the forest will accuse him of stealing the land, but Ru assures him that the Demon Lord won't care. Hiraku decides to improve the waterways around the farm.
4	4	"Waterways Make Life Feel Complete"; Transliteration: "Suiro wa Kurashi o Jūjitsu Saseru" (Japanese: 水路は暮らしを充実させる)	Tōru Kitahata	Touko Machida	Tōru Kitahata	January 27, 2023
Zabuton captures a monster Queen Bee and gives it to Hiraku, who constructs a shed for her to build a hive and produce honey. Hiraku and the elves construct a canal and reservoir for access to water and fishing. With an abundance of water, Hiraku constructs his first rice field and uses the first harvest to make onigiri with fish. Next, they construct a bath house, including a second reservoir which they filled with slimes to purify water from the baths before returning it to the river. Hiraku is able to have a bath, but his relaxing bath becomes very stressful surrounded by nine beautiful naked ladies, who insists on joining him in the bath. Five additional elven girls make their way to the farm, so Hiraku decides to build more houses. The elves seem determined to begin having babies as soon as possible, worrying Hiraku as he is the only man among an increasing number of women. Kuro the wolf narrates that he is grateful to Hiraku for giving him and his family a permanent home. He is certain Hiraku, who easily survives in the Forest of Death and attracts so many potential wives, must be more than an average human.
5	5	"Curry and Surviving the Winter"; Transliteration: "Karē to Ettō" (Japanese: カレーと越冬)	Yūsuke Onoda	Sōichirō Kojima	Yasuyuki Ōishi	February 3, 2023
At everyone else's insistence, Hiraku's house is rebuilt even larger with single bedrooms for himself, Ru and Tia; and a communal dining room for everyone to share. Hiraku wisely ignores the secret double bed hidden behind a locked door. Hiraku harvests his first crop of spices, allowing him to make curry with naan bread. Ru and Tia become obsessed with turning cilantro into protective charms against Hiraku's wolves who dislike the strong smell, as they still remember the wolves beating them up the first times they came to the farm. Winter approaches so everyone begins stockpiling supplies, particularly firewood and preserved food. Hiraku fears that he isn't contributing enough as he is the only one unable to use magic, but an elf named Lea assures him that no one else has managed to live and thrive in the Death Forest before. Winter arrives, so with everyone confined indoors, Hiraku introduces board games and bowling, allowing Ru and Tia to maintain their rivalry without damaging anything. Hiraku is surprised that the wolves can also play, with Kuro easily defeating Ru at chess and Hiraku at Mah-jong. Spring eventually arrives, but before they can plant new crops, Zabuton sounds the alarm as a giant Wyvern approaches the farm.
6	6	"This Is a Village"; Transliteration: "Mura Desu" (Japanese: 村です)	Hidehiko Kadota & Ryōichi Kuraya	Ryōichi Kuraya	Ryōichi Kuraya	February 10, 2023
Hiraku's Farming Tool spontaneously transforms into a magical spear, which he uses to kill the Wyvern. The slaying of a legendary Wyvern terrifies the Demon Lord's Generals, and Dryme the Dragon King, who all wonder who exactly is living in Death Forest. Hiraku grows grapes to make wine. Meanwhile, God is punished by his daughter, the Goddess of Agriculture, who reveals that the Farming Tool he gave Hiraku is actually a replica of Gryme the God Spear and that it wasn't meant to be used by humans, and Hiraku has only survived using it because God coincidentally granted him a supernaturally healthy body. Zabuton and the wolves catch another vampire, who turns out to be Ru's cousin Flora. As another researcher, Flora is fascinated by Hiraku's description of fermenting microorganisms which make wine, miso, and tofu, so she moves into the farm, bringing cows and two dozen ogre maids with her. Feeling outnumbered, Tia invites three more angels and a tribe of Lizardmen who provide chickens while the angels are assigned to patrol the Forest of Death. Another thirty elves arrive, all with plans to have babies. Hiraku really starts to worry about the absence of other men. As the farm expands to fit everyone Hiraku renames it the Great Tree Village and throws a feast to celebrate the occasion where everyone unanimously declares Hiraku as the Village Mayor.
7	7	"A Hospitable Heart"; Transliteration: "Omotenashi no Kokoro" (Japanese: おもてなしの心)	Masahiko Suzuki	Touko Machida	Daiji Iwanaga	February 17, 2023
Demon General Beezel meets with Hiraku, who offers the Demon Lord 10% of his harvest as a yearly tax. Beezel accepts, but later reveals to Generals Grattz and Randan that he only accepted 10% for fear of what is protecting Hiraku's village: Vampire Princess Ru, Angel of Annihilation Tia; an army of elves, angels, and Lizardmen; a pack of Inferno Wolves, and a Greater Demon Spider. Dragon King Dryme also visits the village. Hiraku realizes as mayor, the need to cultivate diplomatic relationships, so they build an embassy to house overnight visitors. Hiraku also wisely educates the villagers on the difference between guests and unwelcome intruders. Their next visitors are Beastmen from Howling Village, miners and hunters whose leader Garf negotiates a trade agreement; silver, iron, and glass in exchange for food crops. In exchange for wine, Dryme agrees to ferry trade goods between the Great Tree Village and Howling Village. Eventually, twenty Beastmen ask to move into Great Tree village, all young women. Hiraku finally puts his foot down and demands the Beastmen send men to live in the village as well, only to find the "men" that they sent are boys too young to marry anyone for at least 10 years.
8	8	"The Researcher and the Two Princesses"; Transliteration: "Kenkyūsha to Futari no Ojō-sama" (Japanese: 研究者と二人のお嬢さま)	Takeshi Shiga	Sōichirō Kojima	Daiji Iwanaga	February 24, 2023
As Sena and the other Beastmen acclimate to village life, Hiraku still worries about not being able to use magic. He later defeats a Grappling-Bear and a Bloody-Viper fighting outside the village, which he cooks for another village feast. With Flora's help, Hiraku creates mayonnaise and miso. Later, dwarves led by Donovan visit the village to trade Hiraku's wine for distillation technology, allowing the village to brew corn whiskey. The dwarves end up moving into the village too. Hiraku hopes the dwarves might want to marry, but they are only attracted to women with beards. Two dragons appear and Hiraku almost kills one until Gucci (Dryme's butler) frantically reveals they are Dryme's daughter Lastismoon and wife Graffaloon, Graffaloon asks Lasty (Lastismoon's nickname) to stay in the village as a diplomat, hoping to avoid Hiraku becoming their enemy. Hiraku later assigns Lastismoon responsibility over all diplomatic relations, which the Demon general Beezel finds out on a produce-procurement mission. Terrified Hiraku now "commands" dragons, he sends his own daughter Flowrem to live in the village as a spy. Flowrem is shocked to observe the village's "army" is powerful enough to threaten the Demon Army and is even more shocked to learn from Lastismoon their "commander" Hiraku is a human strong enough he almost killed Graffaloon. Flowrem decides to stay in the village longer than planned despite being (at first) constantly nervous around Hiraku.
9	9	"The Merchant and the Dragon"; Transliteration: "Shōnin to Doragon" (Japanese: 商人とドラゴン)	Yūsuke Onoda	Ryōichi Kuraya	Daiji Iwanaga & Ryōichi Kuraya	March 3, 2023
The village acquits a slime who drank a barrel of the village's precious wine. Autumn rolls in, and, over a hotpot, Hiraku misses seafood, so Flowrem and Lasty arrange to trade for fish with a merchant named Michael. As part of the deal, he requests to become Hiraku's Purveyor and manage all trade between Hiraku and the outside world. Hiraku senses Michael is trustworthy, though it is shown via comical flashbacks where Michael was terrified. Another dragon challenges Hiraku to a fight. After capturing her, Hiraku discovers she is Hakuren, Dryme's immature older sister. Dryme explains that Hakuren believed Lasty had married Hiraku and, being single herself, was jealous. Unamused, Hiraku forces Hakuren to repair the damage. Hakuren discovers board games and Hiraku is unwillingly drawn into strip-Mahjong that ends with the ladies seeing Hiraku lose and get naked. Beezel learns of Hakuren's presence in the village, causing his co-worker General Randan to forward his resignation letter in fear. Demon Lord Galgardo is more concerned that his daughter Yuri is going through teenage rebellion. Hakuren tries to move into the village as an unemployed layabout, but after Hiraku punishes her enough times, she becomes the village schoolteacher. Hiraku discovers some Inferno puppies have raided a dungeon home of Lamia ladies. After apologizing to them, the Lamias begin trading dungeon treasure for crops; Hiraku requests for them to wear clothes while in the village. It eventually forms a delivery service for all the trading villages. Meanwhile, Yuri is convinced that Flowrem is Hiraku's prisoner and plans to invade the Great Tree Village.
10	10	"Princess Yuri"; Transliteration: "Ōhime Yūri" (Japanese: 王姫ユーリ)	Tōru Kitahata	Touko Machida	Tōru Kitahata	March 10, 2023
Flowrem learns of Yuri's intentions, but Yuri has been lied to by ambitious but known simpleton demon nobility: Rosalind, Klakkase, and Roaju. Flowrem secretly arranges for Yuri's army to be defeated, but not killed, by the Lamia ladies. As punishment, Flowrem moves Yuri and the idiots into the village to work as an atonement, though she hides their attempted invasion from Hiraku for political reasons. The trio try to escape, but are always foiled by the inferno wolves and demon spiders. The idiots grudgingly help Flowrem with the village's financial paperwork, becoming known as the Town Hall Trio. Learning the truth about the village, Yuri regrets almost invading and returns home satisfied. The Trio decide to stay, preferring village life to demon court politics. Galgardo is confused by Yuri's abrupt personality change and mistakenly thinks she has a boyfriend. Five mountain elves led by Ya move into the village, using their fire magic to craft pottery goods. After a men's bath is built, Flowrem foils a sneaky plot by the Trio to seduce Hiraku. A dungeon is discovered where resides another Bloody-Viper the elves want to hunt as its meat can increase their chances of pregnancy. As winter comes, Ru falls ill and becomes bed-ridden. Due to her symptoms, Sena suspects Ru is pregnant with Hiraku's baby.
11	11	"Everyday Life and the Progenitor"; Transliteration: "Hibi to Shiso-sama to" (Japanese: 日々と始祖さまと)	Takeshi Shiga	Touko Machida	Daiji Iwanaga	March 17, 2023
As Ru's pregnancy progresses, Hiraku goes about his daily schedule of running the village, farm work, checking up on everyone, ensuring village security and combat training. A man suddenly appears, who turns out to be Vampire Progenitor Vargryfe, Ru and Flora's 4000 year old grandfather. Vampires usually have children by transforming another human into a vampire, so Ru's pregnancy is a rare occurrence. Having seen Hiraku's statue of the God, who reincarnated him, Vargryfe reveals that he also met God once before being born as a vampire. He has forgotten most details since; to keep his sanity over his eternal lifespan, he erases his memories every few centuries. Hiraku carves Vargryfe a copy of the statue, which Vargryfe secretly donates to the temple of the God of Creation. The priests are so entranced by such an accurate likeness of God that they let it be known the Great Tree Village is under their protection. To celebrate Ru's pregnancy, Vargryfe sends the village an expensive grand piano. The Trio are too nervous to play it, so Hiraku ends up buying a cheaper version for them to practice on first, though regrets it when their practicing prevents him from a good night's sleep.
12	12	"Birth"; Transliteration: "Tanjō" (Japanese: 誕生)	Hidehiko Kadota	Ryōichi Kuraya	Yoshitaka Yasuda & Ryōichi Kuraya	March 24, 2023
Ru's pregnancy continues. In solidarity, the village gives up alcohol until Ru can drink again. Ru's labor and delivery period is an uneasy time for Hiraku as he was banished from the house for the time being, so he wanders the farm until Ru gives birth to their son Alfred, a half-vampire, and Hiraku is overjoyed at being a first time parent. Hiraku decides the village needs its own currency, as their current system of trading goods is no longer sustainable, so he forges Great Tree coins and gives three to every villager, though there is some confusion regarding exactly what one coin is worth. To celebrate Alfred's birth, a grand feast is held and the dwarves produce a celebratory wine to be saved until Alfred is old enough to drink. Beezel finally declares that the Great Tree village to be too powerful to ever defeat and plans to become allies instead. Galgardo throws a tantrum, mistakenly thinking Beezel wants to arrange a political marriage between Yuri and Hiraku. Hiraku receives requests from almost two hundred people wishing to move to the village to escape wars or persecution, leading to a decision to build an entire second village nearby to house them all: Great Tree Village 2.

==== Season 2 ====
No. overall	No. in season	Title	Directed by	Written by	Storyboarded by	Original release date
13	1	"The Story So Far"; Transliteration: "Yōkoso" (Japanese: ようこそ)	Ryōichi Kuraya	Ryōichi Kuraya	Ryōichi Kuraya	April 6, 2026
With more settlers coming, the group decide that they need a new village. Flowrem also brings more demon girls from her hometown to help her three friends with paperwork. The second village is planned to be built on the other side of a river several distances from the first village so to prevent rebellion. At that location are two tree entwined with each other. Hiraku helps build a road to connect both areas by cutting down trees and building a narrow bridge to reduce the chances of monster attacks. Hiraku helps clear out trees in the second village as irrigation ducts are built to divert water from the river to the new village. He also builds a statue of Zabuton there. The elves and lizardmen take over and build new houses and a bathhouse in the second village. Dryme arrives with the new settlers: a large group of minotaurs. Their leader Gordon reveals that they were forced out of their old village and came here to find a new home. A lizardman named Narf, who knows a lot about minotaurs, gives Hiraku advice. The minotaurs are too big to fit in the houses that they built though, so Hiraku had to bring them to his large house for the time being. Beezel arrives with more new settlers: a group of centaurs. The leader Gruwald is introduced to Lattiaci, a clerk who has connections with the centaurs, who reasons with her. They too cannot fit in the new houses. The next group of settlers are wood spirits called Nyunyu Daphne who do not talk much and can turn into plants. Their leader is Igu, who is a Nyunyu Daphne in tree stump form. They lost their home thanks to humans and Michael had led them to the village. Although they can fit in the new houses, they prefer to live outside in the fields. The new houses are given to the young minotaurs while the centaurs live in the stables for now. Hiraku begins making plans to build bigger houses.
14	2	"The Newcomers"; Transliteration: "Ijūshatachi" (Japanese: 移住者たち)	Takeshi Shiga	Ryōichi Kuraya	Ryōichi Kuraya	April 13, 2026
Hiraku is glad that the minotaurs and centaurs will help run the farm. Everyone works hard to upgrade the second village for the minotaurs and build a third new village for the centaurs to live in, but this time with bigger houses that are suitable for both races. The Nyunyu Daphne are asked to keep watch in certain places around the village since they prefer to be outside. Hiraku learns that the minataurs and centaurs are incapable of hunting, but the Nyunyu Daphne surprisingly are though. Hiraku teaches the minotaurs how to do farm work. He also builds a shrine for the God of Creation and the Goddess of Agriculture. The centaurs help make deliveries throughout the three villages. Hiraku learns that Michael provided them with a horse and wants to try riding it, so he practices by riding Gruwald. The horse gets jealous and willingly allows Hiraku to ride it, leading to a rivalry between Gruwald and the horse, forcing Hiraku to settle things between them. Though they hoped the three villages will thrive, Hiraku knows that they can't always rely on him. Hiraku then spends time with Ru and their son. However, he is still bothered by the fact that there's more women than men. He decides to ask Gordon and Gruwald about it, but this leads to a misunderstanding with the latter.
15	3	"Winter"; Transliteration: "Fuyudesu" (Japanese: 冬です)	Hisaya Takahashi	Ryōichi Kuraya	Madoka Ozawa	April 20, 2026
Winter arrives and the villagers are preparing for the cold weather. Hiraku learns of issues with the food stores due to how much the minotaurs and centaurs are eating while the Nyunyu Daphne do not need food to survive and can withstand the cold air. Hiraku teaches the others how to make rice products, which the villagers enjoy. Grattz visits from the Kingdom of Galgardo and proposes to a female minotaur named Ronana in order to make peace with the Great Tree Village. Beezel is accompanying him. Since Grattz needs permission from Hiraku to marry him, Hiraku questions those who came from Galgardo about the situation. Hiraku decides to give Ronana some time to choose whether she should marry Grattz or not. However, the two begin to fall in love. Beezel and Randan are not happy with Grattz choosing to resign so he can marry Ronana, leading Randan to quit too. Hiraku later asks Michael to provide him with seaweed so he can make a new dish with the rice. The girls also enjoy this new dish. Michael asks to make a trade for the ingredients to make this new dish, but he is denied alcohol. Hiraki next makes sushi for everyone to enjoy, and teaches the ogre maids how to make it. As winter is ending, Hiraku decides to throw a festival, but the girls cannot decide how to plan it since how they throw festivals are different depending on their species. Hiraku eventually settles with planning a martial arts competition for the festival.
16	4	"Martial Arts Competition"; Transliteration: "Butōkai" (Japanese: 武闘会)	Ryōichi Kuraya	Ryōichi Kuraya	Ryōichi Kuraya	April 27, 2026
Spring finally arrives as the villagers, inferno wolves, and demon spiders prepare for the upcoming competition. Hakuren and Lastismoon are asked to be referees for the tournament so they won't accidentally destroy the village. Hiraku builds a stadium where the tournament will take place. Yuri, Galgardo, and Doze (Hakuren's father and Lastismoon's grandfather) arrive to watch the tournament. The tournament involves competitors defeating their opponents by either knocking their opponents out of the ring or making them admit defeat. Winners are awarded with silver medals. During this, it is shown that the inferno wolves are capable of taking a larger size. Hiraku has also named one of Zabuton's offspring Makura, who takes part in the competition. Ru and Tia face each other in the last round, but they are serious powerhouses. Tia eventually wins, but she ends up losing to Makura next, who is declared the winner of the tournament. Hiraku gives Makura a crown as the prize. Because they still want to fight, Hakuren and Lastismoon prepare to fight each other next, but they end up accidentally destroying the stadium. Hakuren wins the battle though.
17	5	"Another Peaceful Day"; Transliteration: "Kyō mo Heiwa" (Japanese: 今日も平和)	Yūsuke Onoda	Ryōichi Kuraya	Aiji Mitsue	May 4, 2026
As Sena helps Hiraku harvest vegetables, Vargryfe arrives for a visit along with a priestess named Fuushu. The two tell Hiraku more about their religion and ask him to help save Fuushu's son, who is undergoing an illness. They go to see Flora, but the cure will be hard to make. As Ru and Flora get it ready, Tia and the elves help find the ingredients while Hiraku gets some of Lastismoon's tears and a stone from Dryme's home. Michael also gives them a rare plant, which is also a needed ingredient. The cure is eventually made, but Flora's workshop is destroyed in the process. After Vargryfe and Fuushu leave, Hiraku discover that the shrine that he built earlier, which Fuushu has being praying during her time here, is glowing, so he closes the shrine to block out the brightness. A new tree is then discovered in the farm, which produces walnuts. There is also another tree that produces almonds. A third new plant is discovered in the ground, which produces peanuts. Upon discovering a fourth new tree, Hiraku sees that it produces cashews. Hiraku later tests out a basket tied to a parachute. The wine slime wants to ride it, though it ends up jumping from the basket while in midair. Ya's assistant Hiterto then recalls the backstory of the mountain elves. Ya has a crush on Hiraku, so Hiterto attempts to help her win his heart, but this proves difficult for Ya.
18	6	"Fine Day for Visitors"; Transliteration: "Raikyaku Biyori" (Japanese: 来客日和)	Hisato Shimoda	Ryōichi Kuraya	Aiji Mitsue	May 11, 2026
New angels and harpies are found captured by the wolves and killer spiders in front of the villager. Granmaria, one of the three angels who patrols the forest, explains that she called them here because they need more people to patrol the forest and the reason why they are tied up is because their earlier approach was an attack out of pride. She and another angel named Kiabit explain their roles in gaining a husband. The angels and harpies swear loyalty to Granmaria while Kiabit is punished for her earlier actions. Kiabit and Hiraku take part in five tests as part of Kiabit's punishment, which Hiraku passes with ease. Kiabit cheats in the last test, but Tia catches her. Tia also tells Hiraku more about Kiabit's intentions, and Kiabit decides to stay in the village. The harpies and new angels help with the patrols. A dragon later arrives in the village and takes a human form. He requests Hiraku to allow him to stay here. He is revealed to be Hakuren and Dryme's brother Domyme. Another dragon then arrives and also takes a human form. Her name is Quon and she is meant to marry Domyme. Due to her overbearing nature, Domyme is nervous about the engagement while Hiraku convinces him to stand up to Quon and agree to marry her by writing a letter. Hiraku also tells Quon to do the same. After they write their letters, the two at last agree to marry each other in the future before leaving. Hakuren also gets the idea to write a letter to Hiraku.
19	7	"Hot Spring Expedition"; Transliteration: "Onsen Chōsatai" (Japanese: 溫泉調查隊)	Haruo Shin'nami	Ryōichi Kuraya	Ryōichi Kuraya	May 18, 2026
A northern dungeon was discovered and a scout party has brought back some bloody vipers that they defeated, which they use to make new types of food. Hiraku learns of giants living in a dungeon along with some hot springs located near the dungeon. He is determined to find the hot springs, though isn't sure about inviting the giants to help them. Vargryfe also joins the group in their search and teleports them to the dungeon, but discover that the giants are fuzzy creatures that are the same size as the centaurs. They are attacked by mole-like monsters called an earth rats. After killing them, they learn that part of the dungeon collapsed, which allowed the earth rats to enter thanks to Hiraku's group hunting the bloody vipers earlier. Half of the group stay behind to fix the collapsed portion of the dungeon while Hiraku and the others resume their search for the hot springs. They take down a giant grappling bear along the way. Reaching the hot springs, Tia reveals that hotstones, rocks that rise the temperature, is what's making the water hot, and they decide to mix it with cold water from a nearby river. After they build a private resort and divert water from the hot springs and the river to it, they still need to add changing rooms. Kiabit also arrives to help. Meanwhile, the other group discover a tunnel that the earth rats were digging and suspect that the creatures were looking for something. They discover a black stone with strange writing, but are attacked by undead. Lastismoon defeats them, but accidentally starts a fire, which Hiraku's group quickly put out. Afterwards, they spend the night in the new resort. Meanwhile, Vargryfe leads a small group to deal with the undead's leader, the Lord of Death, who was the one controlling the earth rats.
20	8	"More Hot Spring Expedition"; Transliteration: "Zoku Onsen Chōsatai" (Japanese: 続・温泉調査隊)	Oma Nozomi	Ryōichi Kuraya	Ryōichi Kuraya	May 25, 2026
The new resort is functioning well. Vargryfe's group returns and tells Hiraku about the undead. With them is a young girl, who turns out to be the undead leader whom Vargryfe's group had defeated, which transformed into this little girl while causing her to lose her memories. The girl introduces herself as Urza. She reveals that when she awoke as the undead leader, she created an army of earth golems in search for the same type of black stones that Vargryfe saw earlier, and eventually made an army of undead soldiers and earth rats until Vargryfe's group ambushed her. Kiabit suspects that she might be the legendary hero queen. During another bath, Vargryfe tells Hiraku about the dungeon and the mysterious black stones. Urza has trouble understanding how to use the baths. Kiabit also returns to her hometown. Hiraku goes with Vangryfe, Lastismoon, Hakuren, and Ru to check out the black stone. Strange black mist emerges from the stone, but only Hiraku can see it. Since the stone seems highly indestructible, Hiraku decides to crave it into a statue that resembles God and gargoyle statues around it and the area above to protect the statue from evil forces. Since they didn't finish exploring the tunnels, Vangryfe asks Hiraku to find and crave more of the black stones. Vangryfe and Ru return to the resort to get help with exploring the tunnels while Lastismoon hesitates trying to express her feelings for Hiraku. While chatting with Hakuren, she too struggles with expressing her feelings for Hiraku. Meanwhile, Vangryfe's group resume their search for the other black stones, which proves to be quite rough for them. Seven stones were found in all. Hiraku gets to work craving the other six stones based on the other six gods.
21	9	"Return to Ordinary"; Transliteration: "Futatabi Nichijō" (Japanese: 再び日常)	Takeshi Shiga	Ryōichi Kuraya	Takeshi Shiga	June 1, 2026
A long time ago, an evil god called the Archfiend was imprisoned by the other gods and now he plots revenge. In the present day, Hiraku’s group return to the village to celebrate. Grattz proposes to Ronana. Randan also joins the celebration. Vangryfe notices that Hiraku has a cat, who, unbeknownst to Hiraku, is actually the Archfiend. It is revealed that the seven stones from before were used to imprison the Archfiend, but after Hiraku craved them into statues that resemble the gods, the Archfiend ended up turning into a harmless cat. He then submits to his new life as Hiraku’s pet. Watching this, the Goddess of Agriculture decides to lift her father’s punishment upon seeing Hiraku’s benevolence. Urza gets along well with the other villagers, except for Hakuren. One day, after Urza has trouble animating a clay doll, Hakuren helps her using one of her dragon scales which not only successfully animates the doll, but it also makes it very powerful. Urza and Hakuren at last start to get along. Ru worries about how the outside world would react if they find out about these powerful dragon scales. Ya and the mountain elves build a new catapult, though Hiraku doesn’t want to wage war or commit violence. The mountain elves design a new kind of cooking pot, massage chair, and springs made from dragon scales to balance carriages; they had to first buy a carriage from Michael, modify it so the springs can support it, and then use a ramp to test it out. These inventions prove to be dangerous, but the mountain elves work hard to improve them so they’ll be safer to use.
22	10	"Festivities and Fuushu’s Graduate"; Transliteration: "Omatsuri to Fūshu no Orei" (Japanese: お祭りとフーシュのお礼)	Yūsuke Onoda	Ryōichi Kuraya	Takuya Asaoka	June 8, 2026
Everyone prepares for the upcoming fall festival. They arrange an event called "sliding", but with more safer rules. To prepare for it, Hiraku builds a hill, which comes with a slide, a ramp, and a pool. Once the festival, Hiraku explains that contestants (who are made to wear swimsuits created by Zabuton) would slide down the hill and up the ramp to see how far they can land across the pool in a similar manner to ski jumping. Distance keepers and a rescue team are established and Flowrem is made the host. Ronana is the first to go, followed by Daga, Flora, Kuro, Tia (who cheats by flying), Ru, Sena (who finds her swimsuit embarrassing), and the Town Hall Girls. The latter three then make Rashashi go next, but she gets into an accident, prompting the rescue team to help her. The latter makes Flowrem go next as Rashashi takes over as the temporally host, though Flowrem cheats with magic. Lastismoon is the last to go, but they discover that Zabuton has also entered the competition, who surprisingly wins. This sways contestants to try to beat Zabuton's record. Later, Hiraku and Ru discover that Alfred has started walking and talking. Fuushu returns to thank Hiraku for curing her son and brings more villagers to stay in the village, who are all human. Hiraku is glad that the village will finally have more men. Earlier, it is revealed that when Fuushu tried to invite people to move to the Great Tree Village, no one wanted to due to their fear of her and the Forest of Death, until she manipulated them into doing so; she learned that nobles were spreading lies about her and the village being dangerous and had them punished. The new villagers have trouble with work in the village, so Hiraku gives easier jobs for them. Hiraku learns that one of the new villagers can conjure elemental sprites. A banquet is then thrown to welcome the new villagers and Hiraku has to clear up a misunderstanding with some of the new villagers fearing the elves. One new villager appears to be able to tell that Lastismoon and Hakuren are dragons as she is suspected to be a Dragon Maiden. Meanwhile, a demon-like being watches them from a flying castle.
23	11	"Castle in the Air"; Transliteration: "Sora ni Ukabu Shiro" (Japanese: 空に浮かぶ城)	Kōhei Kamiya	Ryōichi Kuraya	Ryōichi Kuraya	June 15, 2026
Hiraku sees the flying castle in the distance slowly approaching the village. Kuzuden (or Kuzu for short), the demon who rules the castle, contacts them with the intent to attack the village, but immediately surrenders after being intimidated by Hiraku's power. Kuzu explains that the castle is called the Sun Castle, which used to belong to demigods before the demons took it over following a past war, and he is a descendant of the demons. He actually cannot control the castle, which is also filled with monsters. Hiraku deducts that Tia's kind are formerly demigods. They form a plan to infiltrate the Sun Castle to rid it of monsters while Hiraku spends time with Urza and the young beastpeople. Kuzu is eventually defeated and brought to the village where Hiraku shares food with him. Beezel comes for a brief visit. Hiraku decides to visit the castle personally, but finds it mostly in ruins. He and his companions notice a demon and his young daughter, who is trying to protect an innocent monster. Hiraku convinces her to keep it as a pet. In the throne room, Kuzu shows them the sentient crystal that controls the castle. It will only swear loyalty to those who have demigod genetics; it may not work for Tia's kind as they aren't demigods anymore as demigods are all long extinct. The crystal eventually agrees to make Kuzu the operator of the castle, granting him full control. Seeing how poor the demons living in the castle are, Hiraku decides to provide them with food from the village. His group discover a hidden library and a secret chamber where a large crystal is located. They meet Bell Foguma, the chief assistant to the Sun Castle's original ruler, who made the crystal in the throne room. Hiraku is granted the Sword of the Sun to defeat Kuzu, which will set her free from her position. He reluctantly takes the sword despite not having any interest in defeating Kuzu, but proceeds to turn it into soil. Bell is not bothered by that as she is at last free.
24	12	"A Village For All"; Transliteration: "Min'na no Mura" (Japanese: みんなの村)	Oma Nozomi	Ryōichi Kuraya	Ryōichi Kuraya	June 22, 2026
Bell isn't happy with the crystal in the throne room, whose name is revealed to be Gou, for how poor the castle's condition is. Gou explains the castle's history after Bell was imprisoned by the nobles who originally ruled the castle. It turns out the castle is running out of fuel and will crash down into the surface. Getting fuel will be very difficult, but Ru has a hotstone from the hot springs, which can be used as fuel. Hiraku sends Daga and Hakuren to get more hotstones. Kuzu decides to serve the Great Tree Village and gives them the Sun Castle. Hiraku decides to make the Sun Castle the fourth village in the Forest of Death. The group get to work fixing up the castle and its village. Later, after getting the hotstones, Bell learns from Gou that all of the castle's weapons are sold off and it now relies more on defense. A hot air balloon is built so it can reach the Sun Castle. When winter arrives, the Sun Castle remains warm. Hiraku discovers that seeds that he planted in the Sun Castle's fields have grown in three days, but they have no nutrients. After rectifying this problem, Hiraku continues to help the villages survive the winter. With the Sun Castle orbiting the forest, Hiraku gets the idea to use the castle's position to identify the time of the year. Later, Flowrem, Rashashi, and the Town Hall Girls try to figure out a symbol to honor Hiraku, but the latter comes up with a different idea. During a festival, Hiraku designs the symbol: a flag. The next day, the flags are hung around the four villages.

=== Game ===
A browser game, titled Farming Life in Another World: Dreamy Life (異世界のんびり農家 ドリーミーライフ, Isekai Nonbiri Nōka Dorīmī Raifu), was announced in August 2025. The game will be free-to-play and feature in-game purchases.

== See also ==
- Banished from the Hero's Party – Another light novel illustrated by Yasumo
