= Grand Blue Dreaming season 2 =

Grand Blue Dreaming
- Season 2
- No. of episodes: 12

Release
- Original network: MBS
- Original release: July 8 – September 23, 2025

Season chronology
- ← Previous season 1 Next → season 3

The second season of the Grand Blue Dreaming anime series was produced by Zero-G and Liber. It was aired from July 8 to September 23, 2025.

== Production and release ==
In September 2024, a second season was announced, with Takamatsu returning as director and scriptwriter, and Liber joining Zero-G for animation production. The season aired from July 8 to September 23, 2025, on Tokyo MX and other networks. (Note: Tokyo MX and BS11 listed the second season's premiere on July 7 at 24:30, which is effectively July 8 at 12:30 a.m. JST.) The opening theme song is Seishun Towa (青春永遠; 'Eternal Youth'), performed by Shōnan no Kaze featuring Atarashii Gakko!, while the ending theme song is "Hadaka de Dotsukiai" (裸でどつきあい; 'Let's Punch Each Other While Naked'), performed by Seamo featuring May'n. Crunchyroll is streaming the second season. Tropics Entertainment licensed the series in Southeast Asia for streaming on Tropics Anime Asia YouTube channel.

== Episodes ==
No. overall	No. in season	Title	Directed by	Storyboarded by	Original release date
13	1	"Sister"; Transliteration: "Imōto" (Japanese: 妹)	Shinji Sano	Fumikazu Satō	July 8, 2025
Iori gets a handwritten letter and a handmade doll from his little sister, Shiori Kitahara, but struggles to think of how to reply as he can't bring himself to admit to the copious amounts of naked partying and drinking he has done since living and studying at the Izu Peninsula. Unbeknownst to everyone, Shiori planted a camera inside the doll's head to spy on Iori, while Iori thinks she's incredibly old-fashioned and bad with technology. Nanaka suggests that they look through some recent photos to send Shiori, but most of them involve Iori naked or drinking. Chisa then spots a risque photo of Azusa and Nanaka together in the pile, but won't let Iori see it. Iori then becomes determined to see the photo when he's alone with Chisa for the night, but his attempts to subtly steal the photo from her fail. He then decides to attack her directly. Chisa throws a book at him in self-defense, but it bounces awkwardly and knocks both of them out until the morning, when Nanaka returns to the shop and starts punishing Iori for literally sleeping with Chisa overnight. Nanaka then demands he marry Chisa to make things right, creating an awkward moment as Shiori shows up at the door unannounced.
14	2	"Brother"; Transliteration: "Ani" (Japanese: 兄)	Takeshi Toda	Toshizô Kida	July 15, 2025
Shiori helps her brother escape Nanaka's wrath, but Iori still feels embarrassed at her appearance and wants her to leave, partly because he feels annoyed by her and partly to avoid Kohei finding out about her, though he appears and threatens to cut Iori with a chainsaw until Shiori talks him down. The next day, Shiori puts on the act of a doting, loving sister to convince Iori to come back home and take ownership of their family's ryokan, but her attempts fail as Iori is too dense to fall for her act. As the group heads off to give Iori his deep sea diving test, Uncle Toshio convinces Shiori to give it a try, so she goes in shallower water with Chisa, and enjoys being able to play without worrying about keeping up appearances for a moment. Later, after Iori has passed his exam, Iori has a private chat with Shiori and reveals that he knows she doesn't really want to run their family's ryokan either. Shiori then returns home after a couple days at Grand Blue, having enjoyed her trip despite failing her primary goal.
15	3	"Image Game"; Transliteration: "Inshō Gēmu" (Japanese: 印象ゲーム)	Takeshi Toda	Toshizô Kida	July 22, 2025
Toshio lets slip that Iori is not actually related to Chisa by blood, making Aina jealous about his supposed relationship with Chisa. As Iori and Chisa return from dropping off Shiori at the train station, Aina leads the other Peek A Boo members into playing a rigged game to get Iori to confess, only for Iori to turn it on Aina, who gets herself drunk by accident. Iori then tells Ryujiro how he doesn't view Chisa in that manner, but then makes a comment about Nanaka's body right as she returns from a shopping trip, leading to another awkward moment for Iori. Later, Aina falls sick after passing out in her swimsuit after the party and Nanaka takes care of her. Iori and Nanaka take their shifts at Grand Blue, but Iori's attempts to make up with her only increases her awkwardness towards him. Azusa soon returns to the shop and helps defuse the situation between the two. Meanwhile, Chisa tells Aina that she's only pretending to like Iori to stop guys from hitting on her, making Aina wonder if she's the only one who wants a real relationship.
16	4	"Ticket Scramble"; Transliteration: "Chiketto Sōdatsu-sen" (Japanese: チケット争奪戦)	Kentarō Mizuno	Nobuhiro Takamoto	July 29, 2025
Aina tries to host a "girls' night" in Chisa's room but it keeps getting interrupted by Iori bringing in snacks at awkward moments and Aina's own insecurities. When Aina announces she has tickets to the Oumi Women's College festival, Iori and Kohei overhear her and try to get the ticket after she has given it to Chisa. The next day, the men at Chisa's school do increasingly desperate acts to beg Chisa to let them attend the festival with her. After a gauntlet interview where the men fight each other to attend the festival as guests under Chisa's ticket, the situation is resolved when Yuu's girlfriend allows him to attend on her own ticket, bringing the number of guests down, but leaving Chisa exhausted from the whole ordeal.
17	5	"First Time at a Women's University"; Transliteration: "Hajimete no Joshidai" (Japanese: はじめての女子大)	Shigenori Awai	Shinichi Watanabe	August 5, 2025
Iori and Kohei are welcomed into the Women's College Festival with Chisa, but all three are quickly pressed into service as maids at the "Cakey Cafe," where Aina and her friends are wearing an absurd amount of makeup while serving drinks and snacks to visitors. Azusa arrives a bit later and recognizes her club-mates even with their new outfits, but delivers the news that Kaya Mizuki's concert may have to be cut down due to problems setting up her stage. Kohei immediately volunteers to help finish the set, and leaves the cafe with Azusa, while Iori is told to stay behind. Later, Iori ends up serving four other friends who arrived on another guest ticket, but they don't recognize him through his maid outfit, so he decides to play an escalating series of pranks that ends with Hajime, Shinichiro, and Yu all thrown out of the college by security guards. Aina gets tired of Iori's behavior and has him thrown out too. The four young men resolve to find a way back into the festival. Meanwhile, the other member of the group, Kenta, is still at the table in the cafe, trying to get someone's attention.
18	6	"Back to the All-Girls College"; Transliteration: "Futatabi no Joshidai" (Japanese: 再びの女子大)	Arata Nishizuki	Shinichi Watanabe	August 12, 2025
After several failed attempts to sneak back into the college, Azusa offers to bring in Iori's group as staff for the coming Kaya Mizuki concert, where Kohei is already working and got a front-row ticket for his efforts. Iori and his friends use Kohei to convince a few other girls to hang out with them, but Kohei is only focused on the concert. When he leaves, the group starts mocking him to make themselves look better, until Kohei messages Iori that he can't find his ticket. One of the girls, Sakurako, reveals that she took his ticket to make him give up on his childish interests. However, Iori and his friends leave, deciding to stand up for Kohei, though they quickly regret ruining their chance with the girls. The following day, Kaya's sister shows up at Grand Blue to hand Kohei an autograph from Kaya, and further reveals that Kaya was one of the "Cakey" maids who was happy to meet both Iori and Kohei that day.
19	7	"The Charpy Impact Test"; Transliteration: "Sharupī Shōgeki Shiken" (Japanese: シャルピー衝撃試験)	Keita Nakano & Kentarō Mizuno	Kō Matsuzono	August 19, 2025
19	7	"School Camping for Adults"; Transliteration: "Otona no Rinkan Gakkō" (Japanese: 大人の林間学校)	Keita Nakano & Kentarō Mizuno	Kō Matsuzono	August 19, 2025
The flamboyant assistant professor, Ushironomiya, gives Iori, Kohei, Shinichirō, and Hajime an assignment to complete the Charpy impact test in class, using their own bodies to absorb the impact. After all 4 boys test the angle of the hammer smacking into their crotch, they trick their teacher into doing the same test, but add a 300g weight to the end of the hammer, making him feel the same pain despite having the correct angle. Later, Iori, Kohei, Aina, and Chisa head to an abandoned school for a summer trip, where they find the rest of Peek-a-Boo have set up a "Test of Courage" for them ahead of time. After braving the traps set to scare them, the group enjoys partying around a bonfire. As Iori offers Chisa a drink, Chisa slips on konjac jelly and kisses him. Chisa then washes her mouth out and accidentally drinks Spirytus. As Iori tries to find a place to put her down, Chisa drunkenly says she wants him to get a job to buy some diving equipment. Iori later decides to get a part-time job at a nearby restaurant, only to find that one of his co-workers is Sakurako, still mad from when he poured beer over her head at the festival.
20	8	"Coworkers"; Transliteration: "Baito Nakama" (Japanese: バイト仲間)	Kentarō Mizuno	Nobuhiro Takamoto	August 26, 2025
Iori endures power harassment from Sakurako as she trains him to be a server at the restaurant, but she shows a sweeter side when in the presence of another junior employee, the more pretty-faced Naomi Otoya. Naomi later reveals that he is the head of his school's diving club, and asks Iori to visit Grand Blue with him. Sakurako, hoping to pursue Naomi romantically, invites herself along as well. Sakurako keeps pulling Iori aside to get his opinion on seducing Naomi, while feeling jealous of the attention Naomi gets from the other girls at Grand Blue. Meanwhile, Aina thinks Sakurako is trying to seduce Iori, and gets jealous of her, confronting her in "Cakey" makeup. During their argument, Naomi slips outside with Chisa to ask if "there is a partner" in the mix, but Naomi is referring to Iori.
21	9	"Are You In Love?"; Transliteration: "Suki na no?" (Japanese: 好きなの?)	Hiroki Sakamoto	Fumikazu Satō	September 2, 2025
More misunderstandings ensue as Chisa tries to find out if Iori is gay, Iori wonders if Chisa and Naomi hooked up outside, and Sakurako wonders why Naomi seems so smitten with Iori as she takes out her frustrations on Iori. The next few days at work, Sakurako gets some dating advice from Iori and his friends in exchange for promising to introduce him to one of her friends. One day, Sakurako's friends show up at the restaurant and encourage her to just ask out Naomi, but he turns her down, and she vents her frustrations on Iori during their break. The following day, she manages to recover. After his shift is over, Iori gets text messages from Aina asking him out to see a movie together, just the two of them.
22	10	"Movie Date"; Transliteration: "Eiga Dēto" (Japanese: 映画デート)	Hidehiko Kadota	Fumikazu Satō	September 9, 2025
After getting some unsolicited advice from her friends, Aina goes on a date with Iori, who takes her to see a movie called Outbox. The two of them even go shopping together and spend some time at a nearby restaurant. However, Aina still can't bring herself to say out loud that she loves Iori (though the other restaurant patrons all notice). Later that evening, Azusa tells Iori that Aina will have to return to her rural family soon, as they can't afford the tuition to keep her going to college. The next day, Iori and Kohei brainstorm ways to help Aina earn enough money to stay in school. However, they can't find items worth enough to sell to cover her living expenses, even after going through Kohei's stash of embarrassing otaku merchandise. Shinji and Ryujiro then tell the group that Aina is just going home for the summer, to work on her family's farm, so they'll keep paying her tuition, angering Iori and Kohei after all the effort they expended for her.
23	11	"Let's Go to an Uninhabited Island!"; Transliteration: "Mujintō e Ikō!" (Japanese: 無人島へ行こう!)	Tsurumi Mukōyama	Shinichi Watanabe	September 16, 2025
24	12	"Now We're Even"; Transliteration: "Kore de Chara" (Japanese: これでチャラ)	Kentarō Mizuno	Yōichi Ueda	September 23, 2025
