= Apprentice Nail Artist in a Foreign Land =

Japanese manga series

- First tankōbon volume cover

異郷の爪塗り見習い (Ikyō no Tsume Nuri Minarai)
- Genre: Isekai
- Manga
- Written by: Marukawa
- Published by: Shufu to Seikatsu Sha
- English publisher: NA: Tokyopop
- Imprint: Pash! Comics
- Magazine: Pash Up! (2022–2024); Comic Pash! Neo (2024–present)
- Original run: March 2, 2022 – present
- Volumes: 7
- Anime
- Directed by: Daiji Iwanaga
- Written by: Tomoko Konparu
- Studio: Zero-G
- icon

Apprentice Nail Artist in a Foreign Land (Japanese: 異郷の爪塗り見習い, Hepburn: Ikyō no Tsume Nuri Minarai) is a Japanese manga series written and illustrated by Marukawa. It began serialization in Shufu to Seikatsu Sha's Pash Up! manga website in March 2022 and was later transferred to the Comic Pash! Neo website in December 2024. Its chapters have been collected into seven tankōbon volumes as of September 2026. An anime adaptation produced by Zero-G has been announced.

== Plot ==
Keiko "Sara" Sahara is an office worker, though she does nail art as a hobby. One day, she is reincarnated into another world where nail art gives people magical powers. She decides to take a job as an apprentice nail painter, where she paints nails with beautiful and practical designs, while also working with other artists to improve her work.

== Media ==
=== Manga ===
Written and illustrated by Marukawa, Apprentice Nail Artist in a Foreign Land began serialization in Shufu to Seikatsu Sha's Pash Up! manga website on March 2, 2022. It was transferred to the Comic Pash! Neo website on December 17, 2024. The series is based on the manga Isekai Gel Nail (異世界ジェルネイル), which was published on Marukawa's Twitter account. The first tankōbon volume was released on November 4, 2022. Print releases starting with the sixth volume included colored pages that were originally only available in digital versions. In April 2026, Shufu to Seikatsu Sha announced that previous volumes of the manga would be re-released in "semi-color" editions. As of September 2026, seven volumes have been released.

In July 2025, Tokyopop announced that it had licensed the series for English publication. The first volume was released on April 7, 2026.

==== Volumes ====
| No. | Original release date | Original ISBN | English release date | English ISBN |
|---|---|---|---|---|
| 1 | November 4, 2022; May 1, 2026 (semi-color) | 978-4-39-115840-3; 978-4-39-116825-9 (semi-color) | April 7, 2026 | 978-1-42-788486-2 |
| 2 | April 6, 2023; May 1, 2026 (semi-color) | 978-4-39-115954-7; 978-4-39-116821-1 (semi-color) | September 8, 2026 | 978-1-42-788776-4 |
| 3 | December 1, 2023; June 5, 2026 (semi-color) | 978-4-39-116121-2; 978-4-39-116822-8 (semi-color) | — | — |
| 4 | June 7, 2024; July 3, 2026 (semi-color) | 978-4-39-116242-4; 978-4-39-116823-5 (semi-color) | — | — |
| 5 | January 10, 2025; August 7, 2026 (semi-color) | 978-4-39-116366-7; 978-4-39-116824-2 (semi-color) | — | — |
| 6 | October 3, 2025 | 978-4-39-116609-5 | — | — |
| 7 | September 4, 2026 | 978-4-39-116826-6 | — | — |

=== Anime ===
An anime adaptation was announced on October 1, 2025. It will be produced by Zero-G and directed by Daiji Iwanaga, with series composition handled by Tomoko Konparu, who will also write the scripts with Michiko Yokote.
