= Grand Blue Dreaming season 1 =

Grand Blue Dreaming
- Season 1
- No. of episodes: 12

Release
- Original network: MBS
- Original release: July 14 – September 18, 2018

Season chronology
- Next → season 2

The first season of the Grand Blue Dreaming anime series was produced by Zero-G. It was aired from July 14 to September 29, 2018.

== Production and release ==
The series aired from July 14 to September 29, 2018, on the Animeism programming block on MBS, TBS and BS-TBS, as well as other networks. (Note: MBS listed the series premiere on July 13, 2018 at 26:25, which is effectively July 14 at 2:25 a.m. JST.) The opening theme song is "Grand Blue" performed by Shōnan no Kaze, while the ending theme song is "Konpeki no al Fine" (紺碧のアル・フィーネ) performed by Izu no Kaze (a group formed by Yūma Uchida, Ryohei Kimura, Hiroki Yasumoto, and Katsuyuki Konishi). The first season was streamed exclusively on Amazon Prime Video worldwide.

== Episodes ==
No. overall	No. in season	Title	Directed by	Written by	Storyboarded by	Original release date
1	1	"Deep Blue"; Transliteration: "Dīpu Burū" (Japanese: ディープブルー)	Shinji Takamatsu	Shinji Takamatsu	Shinji Takamatsu	July 14, 2018
Iori Kitahara heads to the shop Grand Blue to meet with his extended family and start his new college life. However, he is shocked to discover the shop overtaken by several rowdy, drunken, naked men. As Iori runs away, two of the men from the diving club chase after him, eventually catching him and dragging him back to the shop. While trying to find someone to take the scene seriously, Iori gets swept up in the antics of the club, getting drunk and stripped of all clothing except his boxers. The next day, Iori and the other two men wake up just outside of Izu University for his orientation, but he has no time to change. After a brief encounter with Kōhei Imamura, Iori tries to find someone to give him spare clothes, but he sounds like a pervert and is chased around campus by police. Eventually, Iori is initiated into the "Peek a Boo" Diving Club by the two men from earlier: Shinji Tokita and Ryujiro Kotobuki. Iori tricks Kohei into joining the club with him, and the two freshmen are pressed into a drinking contest where even the "water" is a large glass of vodka.
2	2	"Underwater"; Transliteration: "Mizu no Naka de" (Japanese: 水の中で)	Atsuko Tonomizu	Shinji Takamatsu	Toshizô Kida	July 21, 2018
Iori realizes he hasn't actually slept in his new room yet, but the others in Peek a Boo are planning a mixer with some women from the local Oumi Women's College, so Iori tries to quickly make up his room to convince Nanaka he's responsible enough to go to the mixer. However, Shinji, Ryujiro, and Kohei all "help" decorate his room with lewd posters, creating increasingly awkward scenes when Nanaka and Chisa come to check on him, until Nanaka forces him to sleep in a rundown adjacent room. Later, Shinji and Ryujiro try to get Iori used to being underwater at a local pool to prepare him for deep-sea diving. However, after seeing Ryujiro rip off Kohei's bottom, Iori resolves not to get involved. That night, Nanaka takes Iori to an aquarium at Chisa's request, inspiring him to try out diving.
3	3	"A New World"; Transliteration: "Shin Sekai" (Japanese: 新世界)	Keisuke Nishijima	Shinji Takamatsu	Takeshi Kumamoto	July 28, 2018
Shinji and Ryujiro inform Iori and Kohei that they are being entered into the Male Pageant at the Izu Spring Festival to raise money for the club, despite their objections at their respective costumes. Afterwards, Iori finally tries out deep-sea diving for the first time in a wetsuit under Ryujiro's supervision. He returns to Grand Blue, excitedly telling Chisa his experience underwater. The next morning, Iori wakes up next to a half-naked woman. Shinji and Ryujiro tell Iori that woman is Azusa, and they don't consider her a traditional woman at all. Later, Iori and Kohei are training to make Okonomiyaki for the festival, while secretly trying to get Chisa drunk and convince her to enter the Women's Pageant so that they won't need to enter the Male Pageant if she wins. However, all their attempts backfire. Azusa finally gets the boys to admit their true motives. Later that night, Azusa beats the young men in strip rock-paper-scissors, then convinces Chisa to give the beauty pageant a shot. The morning after, Shinji and Ryujiro announce that Chisa has decided to enter the Women's Pageant, under the condition that Iori and Kohei enter the Men's Pageant as well.
4	4	"The Male Beauty Pageant"; Transliteration: "Dan Kon" (Japanese: 男コン)	Ryūta Kawahara	Shinji Takamatsu	Hiroshi Kugimiya	August 4, 2018
Iori and Kohei's initial excitement at the Izu Spring Festival fades when they realize they have to man their club's okonomiyaki stand for most of it. Later that afternoon, the Women's Beauty Pageant begins. Chisa takes the stage in a dress, but is noticeably stiff on stage, and the club's attempts to increase her appeal only backfire. Iori comes up with an idea to throw super balls he won earlier to lift her dress up from afar with his club, but Iori soon realizes that his club left him alone on the task, as Chisa looks for revenge. While hiding from her wrath, a "Cakey" girl appears and asks Kohei to go out with her, but he refuses. The club then has a brief party, as Chisa pressures Iori into drinking two liters of shochu as penance, before the Men's Beauty Pageant that evening. Cakey reappears outside their room, crying to Iori and Kohei that her friends on the tennis team saw her as a joke and rejected her from their group. At the Men's Pageant, the Captain of the tennis club, Kudo, fights against Kohei for Azusa's love, only for Iori to rip off his disguise and reveal that Kudo was trying to attract him while disguised as Azusa, embarrassing him in front of the whole festival. Chisa and Iori are declared the winners of their respective Pageants, and Cakey thanks Iori and Kohei for their act while they drink from washtubs at the after-party. The next day, Chisa and a wasted Iori are honored on stage, and Chisa declares Iori her boyfriend, thinking it will fend off the advances of the other men at the Festival. The men in the audience call for his death instead.
5	5	"Too Late"; Transliteration: "Ato no Matsuri" (Japanese: 後の祭り)	Yoshihisa Matsumoto	Shinji Takamatsu	Yoshihiro Takamoto	August 11, 2018
The next day in class, Iori discovers that all the men are glaring at him, and Chisa's reactions to Iori's questions enrage them further. The men in Izu University continue sending death threats, and a couple directly plan to kill Iori and Kohei and bury them in the mountains for their perceived luck with women, until the two men panic and buy their way out by promising to hold a mixer. Iori and Kohei beg Azusa to help them, and she brings in Aina Yoshiwara, a new member of Peek-a-Boo, to set up the mixer. To their surprise, Aina is the "Cakey" girl, but without her makeup on. The next evening, Iori and Kohei head to a bar with Hajime Nojima and Shinichiro Yamamoto. The men are shocked when they see Aina and her three friends all wearing "Cakey" makeup. Shinichiro continues on, trying to attract one of the women, and the rest of the men alternate between trying to help him and sabotaging each other. Eventually, the women leave, laughing at the spectacle without liking any of them. The men go off drinking elsewhere while the women retreat to a cafe and Aina starts having feelings for Iori.
6	6	"First Buddy"; Transliteration: "Hatsu Badi" (Japanese: 初バディ)	Masaki Utsunomiya	Shinji Takamatsu	Hiroyuki Ochi	August 18, 2018
Iori, Kohei, and their classmates try to cheat on their German language test, but their plans all backfire. Later, Aina is officially inducted into Peek a Boo, only to find herself as the only sane member of the group. She begs the others to put on some clothes after going to the store with Chisa, but returns to find them in the middle of another stripping game. After the party, Shinji and Ryujiro try to run the new members through hand signals to study for their next diving trip, as Iori ends up practicing to get away from the potential wrath of Nanaka. The next day, Iori goes diving with Chisa while Aina gets past her initial awkwardness and they both enjoy their time underwater.
7	7	"Doubles"; Transliteration: "Daburusu" (Japanese: ダブルス)	Takashi Kobayashi	Shinji Takamatsu	Toshizô Kida	August 25, 2018
After passing their German test, Iori's classmates decide to have a party at his place in Grand Blue to check if he actually has a relationship with Chisa. Shinichiro tries to hook up with Nanaka, but ends up running into several naked men instead. As the crew are about to drink, Chisa appears, creating an awkward moment for Iori. The next day, Tinkerbell challenges Peek a Boo to a doubles tennis match to get revenge for the humiliation their Captain incurred at the festival. Shinji and Ryujiro destroy their opponents with raw power, but Chisa stumbles when the club's compliments make her feel embarrassed about her tennis outfit. Finally, Iori shows surprising skill at tennis, but his partner Kohei can't even hit the ball over the net, forcing Iori to take drastic action to win the match. With their extra winnings from the match secured, the club plans an outing to Okinawa.
8	8	"Men's Cocktails"; Transliteration: "Otoko no Kakuteru" (Japanese: 男のカクテル)	Yoshihisa Matsumoto	Shinji Takamatsu	Yōichi Ueda	September 1, 2018
Shinji offers a part-time job to Iori and Kohei with a moving company, but they spend most of their pay on a bar tab the following night. Looking to earn more money for the upcoming Okinawa trip, the club takes a trip to a local bar where Ryujiro works as a bartender part-time. After watching him work, Iori and Kohei try to tend the bar themselves, but don't know how to mix drinks and anger Aina with their antics. Later, Iori and his classmates hang out and discover that Yu Mitarai is missing from their gathering. Iori then finds out that Yu is busy with his girlfriend, and leads his classmates to sabotage their night together out of spite.
9	9	"Shopping"; Transliteration: "Ōsama Gemu" (Japanese: 王様ゲーム)	Atsuko Tonomizu	Kenji Inoue	Koibumi Koiwai	September 8, 2018
Iori and Kohei try to set up another mixer for their classmates. Their plan involves dragging Chisa into a "King's Game" with the rest of Peek a Boo. Kohei chooses the wrong player while holding the King stick, leading Shinji to set up their mixer with a local men's rugby team. Later, Iori mentions he got another temp job directing traffic for a convention. The Peek a Boo crew head to a diving equipment store to buy new gear for their trip. Kohei spots a pair of women's wetsuits that pay homage to a very popular anime, and is elated when Chisa and Aina try them on, even though only he understands the reference. When the crew returns home, Nanaka tells them that they'll have to do more work to make up for the money they spent on new diving gear. The next day, Azusa, Chisa and Aina end up working at the same convention as Iori and Kohei.
10	10	"Arrival in Okinawa"; Transliteration: "Okinawa Jōriku" (Japanese: 沖縄上陸)	Nanako Shimazaki	Shinji Takamatsu	Hitomi Tsuruta	September 15, 2018
Peek a Boo arrives in Okinawa for their trip. Aina looks forward to making happy memories, but her initial happiness is quickly dashed when the men of the group start running around naked, leading her to convince the men to head to a public beach where they have to wear swimming trunks. At the beach, Iori and Kohei decide to ride a banana boat to determine which one of them stays in the men's bedroom with Shinji and Ryujiro. However, the two boys both try to sabotage each other in the same way, falling off the boat at the same time. Back at the beach house, Ryujiro determines that Kohei won "by a wave." Azusa lets Iori sleep in the same room with her and Nanaka, but he can't fall sleep with the two voluptuous women on either side of him, so he ends up studying the diving license exam guide instead, before taking drastic measures to fall asleep. The next day, Iori, Kohei, and Aina take the diving exam in two parts: a written test and a practical exam in deep water. During the test, Aina gets tempted to lie about her remaining oxygen, but Iori helps by reassuring her that the seniors of Peek a Book are better than the ones from her former club. As the group celebrates, Nanaka tells Iori that he's about to fail the test.
11	11	"You Have the Wrong Idea"; Transliteration: "Gokaina Ndaga" (Japanese: 誤解なんだが)	Tarou Iwasaki	Shinji Takamatsu	Miyana Okita	September 22, 2018
Iori tries to think of a way to privately practice for the remaining test portion, fearing how Kohei and Aina might react if they see him fail. Peek a Boo decides to rent a car so they can go to a nearby fish market. However, the only vehicle left that will fit them is a flatbed truck. At the fish market, Aina and Kohei overhear the others asking for lewd things, but Chisa points out they are actual names of fish. Back at the beach house, the group splits into pairs to cook dinner in shifts. Iori manages to pair up with Chisa, and asks for help on his diving practice. However, Aina and Kohei think they are dating. That night, Aina follows Chisa downstairs and finds out from her that she was trying to help Iori practice. Aina then helps as Iori strips off his swim trunks. However, a policeman appears, forcing Iori to stay in the pool for fear of being seen nude by him. The next day, he ends up sick in bed. While Aina and Kohei continue their exam, Azusa stays behind to nurse Iori. After some questionable first-aid choices, Azusa "half-jokingly" offers to have sex with Iori, but Iori refuses. He then discovers through Azusa that Shinji already has a girlfriend, and the two of them end up getting drunk, just as Kohei and Aina return with their diving licenses.
12	12	"Otori"; Transliteration: "Otōri" (Japanese: オトーリ)	Yōichi Ueda	Shinji Takamatsu	Masaki Utsunomiya	September 29, 2018
The members of Peek a Boo meet up at Miyakojima to go deep-sea diving. Iori, who never finished his exam due to sickness, is forced to stay in shallower waters while being teased about it by Kohei. As the licensed group goes diving, Chisa decides to stay on the boat to comfort Iori, who turns out to be suffering from seasickness. He then tells Chisa that despite missing the license, he had fun diving and would love to come back again. That night, after news that the group has been banned from their chosen restaurant, Shinji and Ryujiro announce that they will hold their own "Otori" in the hotel, where everyone will drink from a giant pot of mixed alcohol. Everyone begins by pouring in Spirytus, as Iori and Kohei try to find a way out of drinking such a high level of alcohol, but soon give in. Aina later takes a trip with a mostly-naked Iori to get more booze for the party, and rants about his lack of clothing upon returning. Azusa offers Aina a drink, but she accidentally picks the heavily-alcoholic beverage, and her personality completely flips as she scares Iori and Kohei into fleeing from the hotel. Iori and Kohei reflect on their time in the diving club as Aina quickly tracks them down.
