= Grand Blue Dreaming season 3 =

Grand Blue Dreaming
- Season 3
- No. of episodes: 12

Release
- Original network: MBS
- Original release: July 7 – September 22, 2026

Season chronology
- ← Previous season 2

The third season of the Grand Blue Dreaming anime series was produced by Zero-G and Saber Works. It ran from July 7, 2026 to September 22, 2026.

== Production and release ==
After the airing of the final episode of the second season, a third season was announced, which is set to take place in fictional Palau. The season is produced by Zero-G and Saber Works, with Takamatsu returning as director. The third season premiered on July 7, 2026. (Note: Tokyo MX and BS11 listed the third season's premiere on July 6 at 24:00, which is effectively July 7 at midnight JST.) The opening theme song is "Natsuko" (夏子), performed by Funky Monkey Babys, while the ending theme song is "Hadaka no Mermaid" (裸のマーメード; Naked Mermaid), performed by Mameshiba no Taigun.

== Episodes ==
No. overall	No. in season	Title	Directed by	Storyboarded by	Original release date
25	1	"Unfinished Business"; Transliteration: "Yari Nokoshi" (Japanese: やり残し)	Keita Nakano & Takumi Fukasawa	Fumikazu Satō	July 7, 2026
26	2	"Homecoming"; Transliteration: "Kisei" (Japanese: 帰省)	Takashi Asami	Katsuhiko Nishijima	July 14, 2026
27	3	"Saving Private Passport"; Transliteration: "Pasupōto Dakkan Sakusen" (Japanese: パスポート奪還作戦)	Keita Nakano	Romanov Higa	July 21, 2026
28	4	"The Oceans of Palau"; Transliteration: "Parao no Umi" (Japanese: パラオの海)	Fumio Maezono	Hachigoumi (Edgeworks)	July 28, 2026
29	5	"TV Special"; Transliteration: "TV Shuzai" (Japanese: TV取材)	Harumichi Nakahara	Shinichi Watanabe	August 4, 2026
30	6	"Assist"; Transliteration: "Ashisuto" (Japanese: アシスト)	Takashi Asami	Romanov Higa	August 11, 2026
31	7	"Mother"; Transliteration: "Okā-san" (Japanese: お母さん)	Keita Nakano & Masami Koide	Takayuki Inagaki	August 18, 2026
32	8	"Mixer, Round 2"; Transliteration: "Gōkon Round 2" (Japanese: 合コン round2)	Harumichi Nakahara	Gota Yoshimoto	August 25, 2026
33	9	"Ordeals"; Transliteration: "Junan" (Japanese: 受難)	Takashi Asami	Shinichi Watanabe	September 1, 2026
34	10	"Lottery"; Transliteration: "Takarakuji" (Japanese: 宝くじ)	Hitomi Tsuruta	Nobuhiro Takamoto	September 8, 2026
35	11	"Back in Okinawa (A-side)"; Transliteration: "Okinawa Saijōriku (Omote)" (Japanese: 沖縄再上陸（表）)	Hisaya Takabayashi & Keita Nakano	Fumikazu Satō	September 15, 2026
36	12	"Back in Okinawa (B-side)"; Transliteration: "Okinawa Saijōriku (Ura)" (Japanese: 沖縄再上陸（裏）)	Takumi Fukasawa	Fumikazu Satō	September 22, 2026
