= Kamui: He's Behind You =

Japanese manga series

- First tankōbon volume cover, featuring Shizuka Mimitsuka

うしろの正面カムイさん (Ushiro no Shōmen Kamui-san)
- Genre: Comedy horror; Erotic comedy; Supernatural
- Manga
- Written by: Eroki
- Illustrated by: Shinko Konoshiro
- Published by: Shogakukan
- Imprint: Ura Sunday Comics
- Magazine: Ura Sunday; MangaONE
- Original run: March 27, 2020 – present
- Volumes: 13
- Anime television series
- Directed by: Takumi Tsukumo
- Written by: Motofumi Nakajō
- Music by: Chihiro Endō
- Studio: Zero-G; ZG-R
- Licensed by: OceanVeil
- Original network: Tokyo MX, BS11 (censored); AT-X (partially uncensored)
- Original run: July 4, 2026 – September 19, 2026
- Episodes: 12
- icon

Kamui: He's Behind You (うしろの正面カムイさん, Ushiro no Shōmen Kamui-san) is a Japanese manga series written by Eroki and illustrated by Shinko Konoshiro. It began serialization on Shogakukan's Ura Sunday and MangaONE manga services in March 2020. An anime television series adaptation produced by Zero-G and ZG-R aired from July to September 2026.

== Plot ==
Kamui, a famous and powerful exorcist, and his ordinary high school girl assistant Shizuka Mimitsuka, who has the ability to see ghosts, work together to exorcise various monsters and other supernatural phenomena. They use a unique method of exorcism, which involves sexual techniques to make evil spirits feel like they are ascending to heaven.

== Characters ==
Kamui (カムイ)
Voiced by: Tomokazu Sugita
Shizuka Mimitsuka (耳塚 シヅカ, Mimitsuka Shizuka)
Voiced by: Riko Aono, Diana Garnet (English)
Oichi (お市)
Voiced by: M.A.O
Kyōko (キョーコ)
Voiced by: Yūka Aisaka
Inagawa (イナガワ)
Voiced by: Shiori Izawa
Bakeneko / Cath Palug (化け猫 / カツパルグ, Bakeneko / Katsu Parugu)
Voiced by: Hiromi Igarashi (credited as Midori Shirayuki)
Lily Kisril (リリー•キスリル, Rirī Kisuriru)
Voiced by: Shizuka Ishigami

== Media ==
=== Manga ===
Written by Eroki and illustrated by Shinko Konoshiro, Kamui: He's Behind You began serialization on Shogakukan's Ura Sunday and MangaOne manga services on March 27, 2020, with its chapters compiled into thirteen tankōbon volumes as of August 2026.

No.	Release date	ISBN
1	August 12, 2020	978-4-09-850220-2
2	February 19, 2021	978-4-09-850464-0
3	August 11, 2021	978-4-09-850668-2
4	February 10, 2022	978-4-09-850884-6
5	August 10, 2022	978-4-09-851233-1
6	March 10, 2023	978-4-09-851748-0
7	September 19, 2023	978-4-09-852835-6
8	February 9, 2024	978-4-09-853124-0
9	August 8, 2024	978-4-09-853520-0
10	February 12, 2025	978-4-09-853861-4
11	August 8, 2025	978-4-09-854196-6
12	February 19, 2026	978-4-09-854426-4
13	August 10, 2026	978-4-09-854727-2

=== Anime ===
An anime television series adaptation produced under WWWave Corporation's Deregula anime label was announced on February 13, 2026. It is produced by Zero-G and ZG-R, and directed by Takumi Tsukumo, with series composition handled by Motofumi Nakajō, characters designed by Toshinari Yamashita, and music composed by Chihiro Endō. The series aired from July 4 to September 19, 2026, on Tokyo MX and BS11, with AnimeFesta to exclusively stream the full "Deregula" uncensored version. (Note: Tokyo MX listed the series premiere on July 3 at 25:30, which is effectively July 4 at 12:30 a.m. JST.) The opening theme song is "Jōbutsu Come True" (成仏 Come True; Nirvana Come True), performed by Orcaland, while the ending theme song is "Say Bye!!" (a pun on the Japanese word for "judgement"), performed by Kotoko. OceanVeil streamed the series.

==== Episodes ====
No.	Title	Directed by	Storyboarded by	Original release date
1	"Mary-san"; Transliteration: "Merī-san" (Japanese: メリーさん)	Kim Won-Ho	Takumi Tsukumo	July 4, 2026
1	"Teketeke"; Transliteration: "Teketeke" (Japanese: テケテケ)	Kim Won-Ho	Takumi Tsukumo	July 4, 2026
Shizuka Mimitsuka, an ordinary high school girl who constantly attracts natural spirits, meets an eccentric ghost spirit named Kamui with a unique exorcism technique.
2	"Kokkuri-san"; Transliteration: "Kokkuri-san" (Japanese: コックリさん)	Yūsuke Onoda	Yūsuke Onoda	July 11, 2026
3	"Cursed Doll"; Transliteration: "Noroi no Ningyō" (Japanese: 呪いの人形)	Atsushi Nakayama	Takumi Tsukumo	July 18, 2026
3	"The Gap Woman"; Transliteration: "Sukima Onna" (Japanese: 隙間女)	Atsushi Nakayama	Takumi Tsukumo	July 18, 2026
4	"Slit-Mouthed Woman"; Transliteration: "Kuchisake-onna" (Japanese: 口裂け女)	Kim Won-Ho	Takumi Tsukumo	July 25, 2026
4	"Rokurokubi"; Transliteration: "Rokurokubi" (Japanese: ろくろ首)	Kim Won-Ho	Takumi Tsukumo	July 25, 2026
5	"Monster Cat"; Transliteration: "Bakeneko" (Japanese: 化け猫)	Yūsuke Onoda	Yūsuke Onoda	August 1, 2026
6	"Ghost of the Mountain Pass"; Transliteration: "Tōge no Rei" (Japanese: 峠の霊)	Atsushi Nakayama	Shin Matsuo	August 8, 2026
6	"Turbo Granny"; Transliteration: "Jetto Babaa" (Japanese: ジェットババア)	Atsushi Nakayama	Shin Matsuo	August 8, 2026
7	"Hanako-san of the Toilet"; Transliteration: "Toire no Hanako-san" (Japanese: トイレの花子さん)	Kim Won-Ho	Shin Matsuo	August 15, 2026
8	"The Succubus"; Transliteration: "Sakyu Basu" (Japanese: サキュバス)	Yūsuke Onoda	Yūsuke Onoda	August 22, 2026
9	"Resurrection"; Transliteration: "Yomigaeri" (Japanese: 黄泉帰り)	Atsushi Nakayama	Shin Matsuo	August 29, 2026
10	"Takaonna"; Transliteration: "Takaonna" (Japanese: 高女)	Yūsuke Onoda	Yūsuke Onoda	September 5, 2026
10	"Yamamba"; Transliteration: "Yamamba" (Japanese: 山姥)	Yūsuke Onoda	Yūsuke Onoda	September 5, 2026
11	"Saruyume"; Transliteration: "Saruyume" (Japanese: 猿夢)	Kim Won-Ho	Shin Matsuo	September 12, 2026
12	"The Succubus Returns"; Transliteration: "Sakyu Basu:re" (Japanese: サキュバス:re)	Atsushi Nakayama	Royden Shimazu	September 19, 2026

== Reception ==
The first volume featured a recommendation from manga artist Ryōma Kitada.

The manga was nominated for the seventh Next Manga Awards in 2021 in the web category and ranked thirteenth.
