= Zero-G (studio) =

Japanese animation studio

Zero-G, Inc.
- Native name: 株式会社ゼロジー
- Romanized name: Kabushiki-gaisha Zerojī
- Type: Kabushiki-gaisha
- Industry: Japanese animation
- Predecessor: Radix Ace Entertainment
- Founded: June 2011; 15 years ago
- Founder: Hiroshi Negishi
- Headquarters: 1-2-10 Sanbiru Igusa, Suginami, Tokyo, Japan
- Key people: Yukiya Sakikawa (CEO); Hiroshi Negishi (director); Hideyuki Kachi (director); Takuji Obayashi (director); Takayuki Watanabe (director)
- Owner: Saber Project Co., Ltd.
- Number of employees: 30
- Website: zerog2.jp

Zero-G, Inc. (Japanese: 株式会社ゼロジー, Hepburn: Kabushiki-gaisha Zerojī) is a Japanese animation studio founded in June 2011 by veteran anime director Hiroshi Negishi. The studio is located in Suginami, Tokyo. In June 2015, Sakikawa Yukiya, a former animation producer at AIC PLUS+, was appointed CEO of Zero-G.

The studio is separate from Negishi's prior studio Zero-G Room, which was established in 1991 and was later shut down in 2001 when it merged with Radix to become Radix Ace Entertainment.

As of April 2023, Zero-G operates as a subsidiary of NOIX and is a group company of Saber Project, an entertainment company founded by Negishi in 2014.

== Works ==
=== Television series ===
Title	Director(s)	First run start date	First run end date	Eps	Note(s)	Ref.
Battery	Tomomi Mochizuki	July 14, 2016	September 22, 2016	11	Based on a novel written by Atsuko Asano.	
Piace: Watashi no Italian	Hiroaki Sakurai	January 11, 2017	March 29, 2017	12	Based on a manga written by Atsuko Watanabe.	
Tsugumomo	Ryōichi Kuraya	April 3, 2017	June 19, 2017	12	Based on a manga written by Yoshikazu Hamada.	
Dive!!	Kaoru Suzuki	July 6, 2017	September 21, 2017	12	Based on a novel written by Eto Mori.	
Nil Admirari no Tenbin	Masahiro Takata	April 8, 2018	June 24, 2018	12	Based on a visual novel of the same name by Otomate.	
Doreiku	Ryōichi Kuraya	April 13, 2018	June 29, 2018	12	Based on a manga illustrated by Hiroto Ōishi. Co-production with TNK.	
One Room Second Season	Shinichirō Ueda	July 3, 2018	September 25, 2018	13	Sequel to One Room.	
Grand Blue Dreaming (season 1)	Shinji Takamatsu	July 14, 2018	September 29, 2018	12	Based on a manga written by Kenji Inoue.	
The Idolmaster SideM Wake Atte Mini!	Mankyū	October 9, 2018	December 25, 2018	12	Based on a manga illustrated by Sumeragi. Spin-off to The Idolmaster SideM.	
Rinshi!! Ekoda-chan	Tomomi Mochizuki	January 8, 2019	March 26, 2019	12	Based on a four-panel manga written by Yukari Takinami. Episode four only.	
My Roommate Is a Cat	Kaoru Suzuki	January 9, 2019	March 27, 2019	12	Based on a manga written by Minatsuki.	
Science Fell in Love, So I Tried to Prove It	Tōru Kitahata	January 10, 2020	March 13, 2020	12	Based on a manga written by Alifred Yamamoto.	
Tsugu Tsugumomo	Ryōichi Kuraya	April 5, 2020	June 21, 2020	12	Sequel to Tsugumomo.	
One Room Third Season	Shinichirō Ueda	October 5, 2020	December 21, 2020	12	Sequel to One Room Second Season.	
The Night Beyond the Tricornered Window	Daiji Iwanaga; Yoshitaka Yasuda	October 3, 2021	December 19, 2021	12	Based on a manga written by Tomoko Yamashita.	
Science Fell in Love, So I Tried to Prove It r=1-sinθ	Tōru Kitahata	April 2, 2022	June 18, 2022	12	Sequel to Science Fell in Love, So I Tried to Prove It.	
The Ice Guy and His Cool Female Colleague	Mankyū	January 4, 2023	March 22, 2023	12	Based on a manga written by Miyuki Tonogaya. Co-production with Liber.	
Farming Life in Another World	Ryōichi Kuraya	January 6, 2023	March 24, 2023	12	Based on a light novel written by Kinosuke Naito.	
I'm Giving the Disgraced Noble Lady I Rescued a Crash Course in Naughtiness	Takashi Asami	October 4, 2023	December 20, 2023	12	Based on a light novel written by Sametarō Fukada. Co-production with Digital Network Animation (now Saber Works).	
Mysterious Disappearances	Tomomi Mochizuki	April 10, 2024	June 26, 2024	12	Based on a manga written by Nujima.	
Let This Grieving Soul Retire!	Masahiro Takata	October 1, 2024	December 15, 2025	24	Based on a light novel written by Tsukikage.	
Beheneko: The Elf-Girl's Cat Is Secretly an S-Ranked Monster!	Tetsuo Hirakawa	January 4, 2025	March 22, 2025	12	Based on a light novel written by Nozomi Ginyoku. Co-production with Saber Works.	
Welcome to Japan, Ms. Elf!	Tōru Kitahata	January 10, 2025	March 28, 2025	12	Based on a light novel written by Makishima Suzuki.	
Grand Blue Dreaming (season 2)	Shinji Takamatsu	July 8, 2025	September 23, 2025	12	Sequel to Grand Blue Dreaming. Co-production with Liber.	
Mechanical Marie	Junji Nishimura	October 5, 2025	December 21, 2025	12	Based on a manga written by Aki Akimoto. Co-production with Liber.	
Farming Life in Another World 2nd Season	Ryōichi Kuraya	April 6, 2026	June 22, 2026	12	Sequel to Farming Life in Another World.	
The Klutzy Class Monitor and the Girl with the Short Skirt	Daiji Iwanaga	April 6, 2026	June 22, 2026	12	Based on a manga written by Takuma Yokota.	
Kamui: He's Behind You	Takumi Tsukumo	July 4, 2026	September 19, 2026	12	Based on a manga written by Eroki. Co-production with ZG-R.	
The Duke's Son Claims He Won't Love Me yet Showers Me with Adoration	Hitoyuki Matsui	July 5, 2026	September 20, 2026	12	Based on a manga written by Kei Misawa. Co-production with Grass.	
Grand Blue Dreaming (season 3)	Shinji Takamatsu	July 7, 2026	September 22, 2026	12	Sequel to Grand Blue Dreaming 2nd Season. Co-production with Saber Works.	
The Iceblade Sorcerer Shall Rule the World II	Masahiro Takata	October 8, 2026	TBA	TBA	Sequel to The Iceblade Sorcerer Shall Rule the World by Cloud Hearts.	
Gacha Girls Corps	Masahiro Takata; Takashi Asami	January 7, 2027	TBA	TBA	Based on a light novel written by Chinkururi. Co-production with Saber Works.	
The Record of a Fallen Vampire	Mankyū	2027	TBA	TBA	Based on a manga written by Kyo Shirodaira. Co-production with Liber.	
Apprentice Nail Artist in a Foreign Land	Daiji Iwanaga	TBA	TBA	TBA	Based on a manga written by Marukawa.	

=== ONAs ===
Title	Director(s)	First run start date	First run end date	Eps	Note(s)	Ref.
The Idolmaster Cinderella Girls Theater Extra Stage	Mankyū	March 24, 2020	April 13, 2021	48	Sequel to The Idolmaster Cinderella Girls Theater Climax Season.	
The House Spirit Tatami-chan	Rensuke Oshikiri	April 10, 2020	June 26, 2020	12	Original work.	
High-Rise Invasion	Masahiro Takata	February 25, 2021	February 25, 2021	12	Based on a manga written by Tsuina Miura.	

=== OVAs ===
Title	Director(s)	Released	Eps	Note(s)	Ref.
One Room Second Season	Shinichirō Ueda	November 30, 2018	1	DVD special.	
The Idolmaster SideM Wake Atte Mini!	Mankyū	March 22, 2019	1	DVD special.	
Tsugumomo	Ryōichi Kuraya	January 22, 2020	1	OVA episode bundled with a manga volume.	

=== Theatrical films ===
Title	Director(s)	Release date	Note(s)	Ref.
Break of Dawn	Tomoyuki Kurokawa	October 21, 2022	Based on a manga written by Tetsuya Imai.	
Kukuriraige: Sanxingdui Fantasy	Fumikazu Sato	unreleased	Original work.	
