= The House Spirit Tatami-chan =

2020 Japanese original net animation

- Promotional header

ざしきわらしのタタミちゃん (Zashiki-Warashi no Tatami-chan)
- Genre: Comedy, horror
- Original net animation
- Directed by: Rensuke Oshikiri
- Music by: ORESAMA
- Studio: Zero-G
- Licensed by: Crunchyroll (worldwide rights outside Asia): SEA: Plus Media Networks Asia
- Released: April 10, 2020 – June 26, 2020
- Episodes: 12 + 2 OVAs

The House Spirit Tatami-chan (Japanese: ざしきわらしのタタミちゃん, Hepburn: Zashiki-Warashi no Tatami-chan) a Japanese original net animation series produced Zero-G. The series aired online in Japan between April 10, 2020, to June 26, 2020.

== Characters ==
Tatami-chan (タタミちゃん)
Voiced by: Shiori Izawa
Ōya (大家)
Voiced by: Satomi Arai
Kusuguri Bōzu (くすぐり坊主)
Voiced by: Tomokazu Sugita
Pom Poko Maru (ぽんぽこ丸)
Voiced by: Yōji Ueda
Karaoke Parlor Manager (カラオケ店 店長)
Voiced by: Keiji Fujiwara
Inanogawa (イナノガワ)
Voiced by: BB Gorō
Spirit (霊)
Voiced by: Megumi Satou
Okiku (お菊)
Voiced by: Saki Kosaka
Karaoke Parlor Employee (カラオケ店 店員)
Voiced by: Kotomi Otsuka

== Production and release ==
The series was announced on November 3, 2019. It was animated by Zero-G and directed by Rensuke Oshikiri. Shun Tokuda edited and composited the animation, with the opening theme song "Catch Your Sweet Mind" performed by ORESAMA, who composed the music. Crunchyroll holds the license to stream the series in English. The series aired from April 10, 2020, to June 26, 2020. In Southeast Asia, the series was simulcasted in Southeast Asian countries on Aniplus Asia, in Hong Kong, Macau and Taiwan on Ani-One YouTube channel.
