= Yūka Aisaka =

Japanese voice actress and singer

- 相坂 優歌
- Born: September 5, 1990 (age 36); Chiba Prefecture, Japan
- Occupations: Voice actress, singer
- Years active: 2013–present
- Agent: Apte Pro
- Musical career
- Genres: J-pop; anison
- Instrument: Vocals
- Years active: 2016–present
- Label: Flying Dog

Yūka Aisaka (相坂 優歌, Aisaka Yūka; born September 5, 1990) is a Japanese voice actress and singer. She is affiliated with Apte Pro. She voiced Sophie Neuenmuller in the video game series Atelier and in the crossover game Warriors All-Stars.

== Filmography ==
=== Anime series ===
- Amagi Brilliant Park (2014), Muse
- Gonna be the Twin-Tail!! (2014), Tail Blue
- Sakura Trick (2014), Kotone Noda
- Jinsei (2014), Nanase
- Dragonar Academy (2014), Orletta Blanc
- Etotama (2015), Usatan
- Castle Town Dandelion (2015), Hana Satō
- Chivalry of a Failed Knight (2015), Kagami Kusakabe
- Shomin Sample (2015), Kae Tōjō
- Active Raid (2016), Hinata Yamabuki
- Ange Vierge (2016), Miumi Hinata (eps. 1 – 4, 11 – 12)
- The Lost Village (2016), Masaki
- Kemono Friends (2017), Silver Fox (ep. 9 – 10, 12)
- Minami Kamakura High School Girls Cycling Club (2017), Chika Watanabe
- Sagrada Reset (2017), Eri Oka
- Recovery of an MMO Junkie (2017), Lilac
- Umamusume: Pretty Derby (2018), Narita Brian
- Magia Record (2020), Mayu Kozue (Ep.3)
- Princess Connect! Re:Dive Season 2 (2022), Ameth
- Gushing over Magical Girls (2024), Matama Akoya/Loco Musica
- Betrothed to My Sister's Ex (2025), Tunica
- The World's Strongest Rearguard (2026), Melissa
- Kamui: He's Behind You (2026), Kyōko

=== Original net animation ===
- Sword Gai: The Animation (2018), Sayaka Ogata
- MILGRAM (2020), Yuno Kashiki

=== Video games ===
- Girls' Frontline (2014) Type88, AR-57
- Ange Vierge: The Second Disciplinary Committee Girls Battle (2014), Miumi Hinata
- Atelier Sophie: The Alchemist of the Mysterious Book (2015), Sophie Neuenmuller
- Princess Connect (2015), Fio, Nebbia
- Idol Connect: Asterisk*Live! (2016), Yui Sezuki
- Warriors All-Stars (2017) Sophie Neuenmuller
- Magia Record (2018), Mayu Kozue
- Princess Connect! Re:Dive (2018), Ameth, Nebbia
- World Flipper (2020), Stella
- Gate of Nightmares (2022), Kirara
- Atelier Sophie 2: The Alchemist of the Mysterious Dream (2022), Sophie Neuenmuller
- D4DJ (2022), Sophia
- TEVI (2023), Memine
- Blue Archive (2024), Ryuuge Kisaki

== Discography ==
=== Singles ===
Release date	Title	Catalog No.		Peak Oricon ranking
Release date	Title	Limited Edition	Regular Edition	Peak Oricon ranking
January 27, 2016	"Tōmei na Yozora"	VTZL-106	VTCL-35221	44
August 3, 2016	"Cerulean Squash"	VTZL-114	VTCL-35234	32
November 8, 2017	"Hikari, Hikari"	VTZL-137	VTCL-35262	36

=== Album ===
Release date	Title	Catalog No.			Peak Oricon ranking
Release date	Title	Limited Edition A	Limited Edition B	Regular Edition	Peak Oricon ranking
January 31, 2018	"Okujō no Mannaka de Kimi no Kokoro wa Aoku Kaoru Mama"	VTZL-138	VTZL-139	VTCL-60460	33
