= List of Malevolent Spirits: Mononogatari episodes =

Malevolent Spirits: Mononogatari is an anime television series based on the manga series of the same name by Onigunsou. The anime was announced in November 2021. It is produced by Bandai Namco Pictures and directed by Ryuichi Kimura, with scripts written by Keiichirō Ōchi, character designs handled by Shiori Fujisawa, and music composed by John Kanda and XELIK. The first season aired from January 10 to March 28, 2023, and the second season from on July 4 to September 19, 2023, on Tokyo MX, BS11 and other networks. For episodes 1–12, the opening theme is "Koigoromo" (恋衣) by Arcana Project while the ending theme is "Rebind" by True. From Episode 13–24, the opening theme is "Dare ga Tame" (誰が為) by Megatera Zero, while the ending theme is "Private Room" (プライベート・ルーム, Puraibēto Rūmu) by Azusa Tadokoro. Crunchyroll has licensed the series.

== Series overview ==
Season	Episodes	Originally released	
Season	Episodes	First released	Last released
1	12	January 10, 2023	March 28, 2023
2	12	July 4, 2023	September 19, 2023

== Episodes ==
=== Season 1 (2023) ===
No. overall	No. in season	Title (Note: English translated titles are taken from Crunchyroll.)	Directed by (Note: Information is taken from the ending credits of each episode.)	Written by	Storyboarded by	Original release date
1	1	"Hyoma"; Transliteration: "Hyōma" (Japanese: 兵馬)	Megumi Yamamoto	Keiichirō Ōchi	Ryuichi Kimura	January 10, 2023
2	2	"Shoreline"; Transliteration: "Teisen" (Japanese: 汀線(ていせん))	Tatsuya Igarashi	Keiichirō Ōchi	Tatsuya Igarashi	January 17, 2023
3	3	"Overflow"; Transliteration: "Itsuryū" (Japanese: 溢流(いつりゅう))	Takatoshi Suzuki	Keiichirō Ōchi	Takahiro Ōkawa	January 24, 2023
4	4	"Arrangement"; Transliteration: "Mikkei" (Japanese: 密契(みっけい))	Takayuki Tanaka	Keiichirō Ōchi	Kunihisa Sugishima	January 31, 2023
5	5	"Suspicions"; Transliteration: "Giwaku" (Japanese: 疑惑(ぎわく))	Megumi Yamamoto	Kazuhiko Inukai	Teruo Satō	February 7, 2023
6	6	"Botan"; Transliteration: "Botan" (Japanese: 牡丹(ぼたん))	Akira Toba	Akira Kindaichi	Kunihisa Sugishima, Takahiro Ōkawa	February 14, 2023
7	7	"Quickening"; Transliteration: "Taidō" (Japanese: 胎動(たいどう))	Takahiro Hirata	Keiichirō Ōchi	Shigeyuki Miya	February 21, 2023
8	8	"Circumstances"; Transliteration: "Kyōgai" (Japanese: 境涯(きょうがい))	Yoshinobu Tokumoto	Kazuhiko Inukai	Kunihisa Sugishima	February 28, 2023
9	9	"Fire"; Transliteration: "Kaika" (Japanese: 怪火(かいか))	Ōri Yasukawa	Akira Kindaichi	Kazuo Terada	March 7, 2023
10	10	"Radiance"; Transliteration: "Genyō" (Japanese: 眩耀(げんよう))	Tomo Ōkubo	Yoshimi Narita	Yasuaki Fujii	March 14, 2023
11	11	"Ambush"; Transliteration: "Ansen" (Japanese: 暗箭(あんせん))	Kenta Kushiya, Tatsuya Igarashi	Kazuhiko Inukai	Tatsuya Igarashi	March 21, 2023
12	12	"Efflorescence"; Transliteration: "Kamei" (Japanese: 花明(かめい))	Takatoshi Suzuki	Keiichirō Ōchi	Shigeyuki Miya	March 28, 2023

=== Season 2 (2023) ===
No. overall	No. in season	Title	Directed by	Written by	Storyboarded by	Original release date
13	1	"Entrance"; Transliteration: "Zurute" (Japanese: 出手(ずるて))	Megumi Yamamoto	Keiichirō Ōchi	Kunihisa Sugishima	July 4, 2023
14	2	"Dance Performance"; Transliteration: "Tsugaimai" (Japanese: 番舞(つがいまい))	Yoshinobu Tokumoto	Akira Kindaichi	Kazuo Terada	July 11, 2023
15	3	"Specter"; Transliteration: "Anki" (Japanese: 暗鬼(あんき))	Ōri Yasukawa	Yoshimi Narita	Atsushi Ōtsuki	July 18, 2023
16	4	"Draconic"; Transliteration: "Ryūhen" (Japanese: 竜変(りゅうへん))	Akira Toba	Kazuhiko Inukai	Masaki Kitamura	July 25, 2023
17	5	"Moonset"; Transliteration: "Rakugetsu" (Japanese: 落月(らくげつ))	Tsuyoshi Nagasawa	Akira Kindaichi	Kunihisa Sugishima	August 1, 2023
18	6	"Vow"; Transliteration: "Guzei" (Japanese: 弘誓(ぐぜい))	Tomo Ōkubo	Kazuhiko Inukai	Shigeyuki Miya	August 8, 2023
19	7	"Turbulence"; Transliteration: "Watō" (Japanese: 波濤(はとう))	Takatoshi Suzuki	Yoshimi Narita	Kazuo Terada	August 15, 2023
20	8	"Unseasonal"; Transliteration: "Kyōhana" (Japanese: 狂花(きょうか))	Megumi Yamamoto	Akira Kindaichi	Masaki Kitamura	August 22, 2023
21	9	"Advent"; Transliteration: "Raigō" (Japanese: 来迎(らいごう))	Ōri Yasukawa	Kazuhiko Inukai	Kunihisa Sugishima	August 29, 2023
22	10	"Dance"; Transliteration: "Kagura" (Japanese: 神楽(かぐら))	Yasuaki Fujii	Yoshimi Narita	Yasuaki Fujii, Takahiro Ōkawa	September 5, 2023
23	11	"Sparks"; Transliteration: "Hibana" (Japanese: 火花(ひばな))	Tatsuya Igarashi, Kenta Kushiya	Keiichirō Ōchi	Tatsuya Igarashi, Takahiro Ōkawa	September 12, 2023
24	12	"Fluttering"; Transliteration: "Fudo" (Japanese: 風動(うどう))	Akira Toba	Keiichirō Ōchi	Kunihisa Sugishima	September 19, 2023
