= WWE 24/7 =

WWE 24/7 may refer to:

- WWE Classics on Demand, formerly known as WWE 24/7 On Demand and WWE 24/7 Classics
- WWE 24/7 Championship
