= Malevolent Spirits =

Malevolent Spirits may refer to:

- Malevolent Spirits: Mononogatari, a Japanese manga by Onigunsou, also made into an anime series
- Vengeful ghost, the spirit of a dead person who returns from the afterlife to seek revenge for a cruel, unnatural or unjust death in mythology and folklore
