= Hensuki =

Japanese light novel series

- Cover of the first light novel volume, featuring Yuika Koga

可愛ければ変態でも好きになってくれますか？ (Kawaikereba Hentai demo Suki ni Natte Kuremasuka?)
- Genre: Harem; Romantic comedy
- Light novel
- Written by: Tomo Hanama
- Illustrated by: sune
- Published by: Media Factory
- Imprint: MF Bunko J
- Original run: January 25, 2017 – January 25, 2022
- Volumes: 14
- Manga
- Written by: Tomo Hanama
- Illustrated by: CHuN
- Published by: Fujimi Shobo
- Magazine: Monthly Dragon Age
- Original run: November 9, 2017 – February 9, 2021
- Volumes: 6
- Anime television series
- Directed by: Itsuki Imazaki
- Produced by: Junichi Takagi; Noritomo Isogai; Ryuutarou Usukura; Gouta Aijima; Kouhei Takeishi; Kousuke Arai; Hideaki Matsumoto; Sou Murakami; Manabu Kimura; Mami Kuwakuma
- Written by: Kenichi Yamashita
- Music by: Youichi Sakai
- Studio: Geek Toys
- Licensed by: Crunchyroll; AUS: Madman Entertainment; SA/SEA: Muse Communication
- Original network: AT-X, Tokyo MX, MBS, BS11
- Original run: July 8, 2019 – September 23, 2019
- Episodes: 12
- icon

Hensuki: Are You Willing to Fall in Love with a Pervert, as Long as She's a Cutie?, (Note: Japanese: 可愛ければ変態でも好きになってくれますか？, Hepburn: Kawaikereba Hentai demo Suki ni Natte Kuremasuka?) also known as Hensuki, (Note: 変好き) is a Japanese harem, romantic comedy light novel series written by Tomo Hanama and illustrated by sune. It was published by Media Factory under their MF Bunko J imprint from January 2017 to January 2022. A total of fourteen volumes have been published. The series follows Keiki Kiryū, a high school student who seeks the identity of the sender of an unnamed love letter attached to underwear, which consequently leads him to discover the special hidden peculiarities of the girls in his life.

A manga adaptation of Hensuki with illustration by CHuN was serialized in Fujimi Shobo's shōnen manga magazine Monthly Dragon Age from November 2017 to December 2020. It has been collected into six tankōbon volumes as of February 2021. A drama CD was released in May 2018, along with a RPG browser game released on the same date. A 12-episode anime television series adaptation by Geek Toys aired from July to September 2019. Reviews of the first episode from the English language anime adaptation were mixed. While critics praised the effort that went into it, they criticized the lack of personalities for the female leads. The original Japanese light novel release fared better as the seventh volume became a top-seller.

== Premise ==
Hensuki revolves around Keiki Kiryū, an ordinary high school student who finds an anonymous love letter addressed to him. What makes things even more interesting is that attached to the letter, there's a pair of panties. To determine the identity of his secret admirer, referred to as "Cinderella", Keiki proceeds to investigate several possible candidates, including his senior and president of the Calligraphy Club (Note: 書道 クラブ, Shodō Kurabu) Sayuki Tokihara; his underclasswoman and assistant librarian Yuika Koga; and his classmate and close friend Mao Nanjō. However, as Keiki seeks to uncover who this mysterious girl might be, he discovers that every girl he suspects is singularly perverted and desperately interested in getting him to participate in their perversion.

== Publication ==
Hensuki is a light novel series written by Tomo Hanama and illustrated by sune. In addition to the five chapters composing the story of Hensuki, all volumes contain a prologue, an epilogue and an afterword by Hanama, respectively. From the first to the ninth, each volume presents, as cover art, the image of a female character of the series undressing. Media Factory released the first volume in Japan on January 25, 2017, under their MF Bunko J imprint. The eighth volume of the series was launched on July 25, 2019, along with a special edition containing additional illustrations. As of June 25, 2021, a total of thirteen volumes have been released. The fourteenth and final volume was released on January 25, 2022.

== Media ==
=== Manga ===
A manga adaptation written by Hanama and illustrated by CHuN was serialized in Fujimi Shobo's shōnen manga magazine Monthly Dragon Age from November 9, 2017, to December 9, 2020. Fujimi Shobo has collected its chapters into individual tankōbon volumes. The series was compiled into six volumes, with the last one being released on February 9, 2021.

A spin-off manga, titled Hensuki: Are You Willing to Fall in Love with a Pervert, as Long as She's a Cutie? Abnormal Harem, (Note: 漫画：可愛ければ変態でも好きになってくれますか？ アブノーマルハーレム, Kawaikereba Hentai demo Suki ni Natte Kuremasuka? Abnormal Harem) was illustrated by kanbe and Hanamoto. It contains alternate, what-if scenarios between the protagonist Keiki Kiryū and the female characters of the series. Hakusensha released its first and only seven-chapter volume on April 24, 2020, under their Young Animal Comics imprint.

=== Drama CD ===
A drama CD for Hensuki, produced by Mosaic.wav and Yksb and published by Seaside Communications, was released on May 25, 2018, featuring the same voice cast from the anime, along with character songs.

=== Anime ===
An anime television series adaptation was announced on February 20, 2019. The series was animated by Geek Toys and directed by Itsuki Imazaki, with Kenichi Yamashita handling series composition, and Yōsuke Itō designing the characters. Youichi Sakai composed the series' music. Seven was credited for animation production assistance. Ayaka Ōhashi performed the series' opening theme song "Daisuki", (Note: ダイスキ。) which was also used as the ending theme for the twelfth episode. Mia Regina performed the series' ending theme song "Mubyū no Hana". (Note: 無謬の花) Mia Regina also performed the theme song "Nagareboshi", (Note: 流れ星) which was inserted into the seventh episode. "Sutera", (Note: ステラ) which is performed by TRUE, was used as the ending theme for the seventh episode.

The series aired from July 8 to September 23, 2019, on AT-X, Tokyo MX, MBS, and BS11. The series ran for 12 episodes. The series is licensed in North America by Funimation, in Australia and New Zealand by Madman Entertainment, and in Southeast Asia and South Asia by Muse Communication. A short anime spin-off titled Hensuki▽ ran after episodes of the main anime on AT-X. The shorts were directed and written by Itsuki Imazaki.

=== Web radio ===
A web radio show, titled Hensuki Radio: Are You Willing to Listen to the Radio with a Pervert, as Long as She's a Cutie?, (Note: 変好きラジオ 〜可愛ければ変態でもラジオを聞いてくれますか？〜, Hensuki Rajio 〜 Kawaikereba Hentai demo Rajio o Kiite Kuremasuka?〜) hosted by Ayana Taketatsu and Rina Hidaka, who voiced Sayuki Tokihara and Yuika Koga in the anime adaptation of Hensuki, respectively, was broadcast every Thursday from June 27 to October 3, 2019.

=== Video game ===
A RPG browser game adaptation of Hensuki was developed by Tatsutori in collaboration with Atsumaru. The game, titled Hensuki: Are You Willing to Fall in Love with a Pervert, as Long as She's a Cutie? [Love × Sugoroku], (Note: 可愛 け れ ば 変 態 で も 好 き に な っ て く れ ま す か? 【恋愛 × ス ゴ ロ ク】, Kawaikereba Hentai demo Suki ni Natte Kuremasuka? [Ren'ai × Sugoroku]) was directed by Haruya Toma and produced by Junichi Yoshizawa and Asahiko Itada. It follows the plot of the series, with the player taking on the role of Keiki as he tries to discover the identity of the sender of a love letter addressed to him. In addition, the game also includes some of sune's illustrations from the light novel. Hensuki: Are You Willing to Fall in Love with a Pervert, as Long as She's a Cutie? [Love × Sugoroku] was released on May 25, 2018, with free post-launch updates being added at monthly intervals.

== Reception ==
The English-language anime adaptation of Hensuki received mixed ratings: For their "Summer 2019 Anime Preview Guide", Anime News Network had for of their reviewers write an opinion on the first episode. Theron Martin gave the highest rating of 3/5 stars saying that the title "Hensuki", translated to "Perverted Love" is "exactly the premise of the series". Martin also stated that the visual style and animation level is "definitely a bit more ambitious that the typical harem series". he concluded by saying that watching the whole series was a "borderline call" due to it not being as "flagrantly sexy as some", but praised the effort that went into it. Rebecca Silverman gave the first episode 2/5 stars saying it felt "like a tease" and was "dull" due to the plot pace, and lack of character development. Silverman also went on to say that the artwork was "washed out", the characters are "bland", and the first episode felt a "bit too predictable".

Reviewers Nick Creamer, and James Beckett both gave the first episode 1/5 stars. Creamer criticized how oblivious the main protagonist Keiki Kiryū is, and how the female characters have no personalities outside of their love for him. Meanwhile, Beckett stated that the first episode was "absolutely devoid of both laughs and sex appeal", and went on to echo Creamer's criticism of how the female characters have no "discernable personalities". Beckett cited Keiki not having "an ounce of chemistry with a one of them" as an issue in particular. Caitlin Moore from "Anime Feminist" also gave the first episode a negative review by criticizing how none of the girls' personalities were generally established before they fell in love with the protagonist. She went on to say that while Harem anime has never been a mainstay of feminism, "at least their casts used to have personalities".

In Japan, the seventh volume of Hensuki has estimated the sales of over 8,792 copies, being one of top-selling light novels from February 18 to March 11, 2019. As of January 2020, the light novel has over 750,000 copies in circulation.

== See also ==
- List of harem anime and manga
