= WWE Classics on Demand =

WWE subscription television program

- Country: United States

Ownership
- Owner: WWE

History
- Launched: November 2, 2004
- Closed: January 31, 2014
- Replaced by: WWE Network
- Former names: WWE 24/7 on Demand (2004–2008); WWE 24/7 Classics on Demand (2008–2009)

WWE Classics on Demand was an American subscription video on demand television service provided by WWE. It featured footage from WWE's vast archive of wrestling footage, including classic WWE, World Championship Wrestling (WCW), Extreme Championship Wrestling (ECW) and more. It offered around 40 hours of rotating programming per month, arranged into four (previously six) "programming buckets", often centered on a specific theme. It was originally called WWE 24/7 on Demand. In September 2008, it was changed to WWE 24/7 Classics on Demand. In April 2009, it was changed again to WWE Classics on Demand.

WWE Classics was presented only on digital cable. Among the services carrying it were Comcast, AT&T U-Verse (discontinued in 2012), Verizon FiOS, Mediacom, Charter Communications, Cox Communications, Rogers Cable, EastLink, Seaside Communications, Cogeco, Armstrong, Cablevision, Sky Italia and not long ago, Astro. Some of its programming was packaged as Madison Square Garden Classics and began airing on MSG Network in the summer of 2006. In November 2007, the service had around 115,000 subscribers.

The service closed on January 31, 2014 to make way for their new video-streaming and subscription service WWE Network.

== Programming buckets and programs ==
The programming buckets and the programs which usually or occasionally appear on them:

- WWE Legends – focuses on "narrative, retrospective and thematic programs" dealing with "legendary" wrestlers.
  - Hall of Fame; "Mean Gene" Okerlund hosts an original profile of a specific WWE Hall of Famer.
    - Throughout the rest of the month a selection of matches featuring that star are featured, changing every two weeks.
  - WWE Old School – Archival house shows from the 1970s to the 1990s. These shows mostly took place in New York, Boston, Toronto, and Philadelphia.
  - Legends of Wrestling; A round table discussion. An occasional program.
  - The Film Room with Gordon Solie; Jim Ross introduces classic footage documenting the career of a specific wrestler or tracing a specific event/feud as called by and featuring interviews with Gordon Solie. An occasional program.
  - This section also contains DVD and video releases.
- The Big Events
  - Vintage pay-per-views and "super show" events from WWF/WWE, WCW, NWA, and AWA. These events could be a few months to years old.
  - WWE U-Choose (formerly Pick Your Big One) - Every month three "Big One" events, based on the next months theme, are offered up to be voted on at WWE's Classics subsite, with the winning event offered for viewing amongst the next months "Big Ones" selections.
  - Usually, a WWE pay-per-view that aired about a few months prior will be shown. This is shown in its entirety but had also been broken down match by match as an additional option.
- TV Classics; The history of professional wrestling is shown through re-airings of wrestling television shows.
  - Extreme Championship Wrestling - Hosted by Joey Styles, Tazz was the original host of the show until he left WWE in April 2009. Tommy Dreamer took over for Tazz as co-host until he left WWE in January 2010.
  - WWF Championship Wrestling - Without a Host
  - AWA All-Star Wrestling - without a host
  - AWA Championship Wrestling - Hosted by Larry Nelson
  - Championship Wrestling from Florida - Hosted by Mike Graham (discontinued in 2008)
  - Smoky Mountain Wrestling - without a host
  - World Class Championship Wrestling - Hosted by Michael "P. S." Hayes and Kevin Von Erich, Jimmy Garvin fills in for Von Erich from time to time.
  - World Championship Wrestling - without a host
  - Mid-Atlantic Championship Wrestling - without a host
  - WWF Prime Time Wrestling - without a host
    - Originally alternated with Tuesday Night Titans in the programming schedule until the final TNT aired in February 2009.
  - The Monday Night War - Hosted by Jim Ross, formerly hosted by Michael Cole, chronological re-airings of the week to week competition between WWF Monday Night Raw and WCW Monday Nitro. Airs as two separate programs. It originally aired as one program until January 2008.
  - Monday Night War: The Beginning - Hosted by Michael Cole, alternating with the "original" Monday Night War programs, The Beginning focuses on the start of the "war" in 1995. It airs as one program like the "original" show did. When this show debuted, Michael Cole was seen sitting behind the RAW announce position inside an empty arena explaining the programming change. This lasted a few episodes until the show began airing without the interlude.
  - Additional programming, sometimes but not always, related to the months theme, is also put into this section.
- Shorties
  - Matches and/or memorable moments centered on the month's theme are hosted by a particular superstar (e.g. moments or matches involving food for Thanksgiving).

== Previous buckets ==
WWE 24/7 logo used until April 2009.

When the service debuted it did so with six, more specialized, buckets. Around April 4, 2007 they were combined and pruned into a more broad set of four. This was done, according to the free "Month Preview" show hosted by Jack Korpela to make things easier for Classics viewers.

The original six buckets and their programming were:

- Hall of Fame - Featuring only the Okerlund hosted biography and matches of a particular Hall of Famer.
- Big Ones - Past pay-per-views
- Specials - Home video releases and network specials
- ECW - The History of ECW show (then hosted by Tazz alone)
- Prime Time - Any past wrestling programming that would have originally aired in or around "prime time", including Monday Night Wars, which aired as one program.
- Old School - Recorded house shows

Over time the "ECW" bucket was expanded to "Territories - ECW" and began to incorporate shows from the "territorial days" of the business. Later still the name was changed to its current "TV Classics" when it started housing the programming found in the "Prime Time" bucket, which was removed altogether. The "Old School" and "Big Ones" buckets were combined, keeping the "Big Ones" name, and becoming a bucket for any and all larger shows. "Hall of Fame" was renamed to the less restrictive "WWE Legends" and began to house material from the "Specials" bucket, which was also removed.

== Legends of Wrestling ==
Legends of Wrestling is an original series made specifically for the Classics service. The program features various "legends" of the business, for their work in and out of the ring, having a roundtable discussion about specific topics, persons, or occurrences in the history of wrestling. The show was originally hosted by WWE commentator Jim Ross–with former interviewer Gene Okerlund filling in for him on a few occasions–until Okerlund took over hosting duties completely with the shows fourth panel.

The series was divided into unofficial "seasons" of hour-long episodes (each with a short intermission) featuring the same panels.

In January 2009, a DVD box set of three episodes: Sgt. Slaughter/Ric Flair, Jerry Lawler/the Junkyard Dog, and "Heatseekers"—about wrestlers who have a reputation of "causing trouble" backstage—along with bonus matches involving the stars. Best Buy exclusives episodes Bob Backlund/Hulk Hogan, The Iron Sheik/André the Giant, and "Rowdy" Roddy Piper/Terry Funk were also released. The episodes come from the first season, with the exception of "Heatseekers", which is a second-season episode.

== Extra material ==
- Before some selections begin there are short "promos" and clips shown featuring either memorable moments in the history of wrestling or a selection of highlights of a particular superstar before that star announces "You're watching WWE 24/7".
- Early in the service's existence, it included an on-screen crawl during some content detailing historical moments—title changes, important matches, birthdays—in the history of wrestling for the month. The crawl was later changed to only featuring title changes.
- Other times a lower third will appear on screen to provide supplemental information to what's going on on screen. Often it is tied into the month's theme.
- On Monday Night Wars, an occasional segment called "War Stories" follows a key moment in the Monday Night War, where stars involved in the moment discuss the immediate reactions to the segment, but can also give insights into why a particular segment happened.

== WWE Video Library ==
The WWE Video Library is among the largest collections of professional wrestling footage, with more than 100,000 hours of material. It includes WWE's own television programs, pay-per-view events, and other recordings, the company's earlier incarnations, as well as archives acquired from defunct and regional promotions. Those holdings include matches and broadcasts from as early as the 1950s and make up a substantial share of the surviving visual record of professional wrestling and sports entertainment in North America.

== Editing ==
Since World Wrestling Entertainment is no longer allowed to use the "WWF" initialism or their 1998–2002 logo except for "specified circumstances", instances of both were edited and/or removed from pertinent programming. In late July 2012, WWE reached a settlement with the World Wide Fund for Nature which once again allows them to use the "WWF" initials and scratch logo on archive footage. Unedited footage first appeared on the 1000th episode of Monday Night Raw and since then has appeared in full length matches shown on the WWE website and on Classics on Demand. In addition, previously licensed music to which the rights have expired are removed or replaced with alternate songs. Additionally, some formerly live events are censored for language and/or nudity. Ring announcer Michael Buffer is also edited out of any programming due to his trademarked phrase, "Let's Get Ready to Rumble".

In the wake of the Chris Benoit double murder-suicide a number of wrestling websites reported that the likeness of and references to both Chris and Nancy Benoit were being removed from pertinent programming. Eventually Nancy's image was allowed to return to programming, though over six years later Benoit's continued to be excised. Most notably both his wrestling and mention of his name was removed from episodes of Monday Night Wars airings of WCW Monday Nitro, as well as match segments from other shows, though he is occasionally mentioned and shown in brief non-wrestling roles. His image eventually returned in a wrestling role during a rebroadcast of World War 3 from 1997. In early January 2014, WWE issued a memo stating that footage involving Chris Benoit would air on the WWE Network with the following advisory: "The following program is presented in its original form. It may contain some content that does not reflect WWE's corporate views and may not be suitable for all viewers. WWE characters are fictitious and do not reflect the personal lives of the actors portraying them. Viewer discretion is advised."
