= The Aquatope on White Sand =

Japanese anime television series

白い砂のアクアトープ (Shiroi Suna no Akuatōpu)
- Anime television series
- Directed by: Toshiya Shinohara
- Written by: Yūko Kakihara
- Music by: Yoshiaki Dewa
- Studio: P.A. Works
- Licensed by: Crunchyroll; SA/SEA: Muse Communication
- Original network: Tokyo MX, BS Fuji, AT-X, MBS, RBC
- Original run: July 9, 2021 – December 17, 2021
- Episodes: 24
- icon

The Aquatope on White Sand (白い砂のアクアトープ, Shiroi Suna no Akuatōpu), or The Aquatope of White Sand, subtitled The Two Girls Met in the Ruins of Damaged Dream, is a Japanese anime television series produced by P.A. Works as the fourth entry in its "Working Series". It aired from July to December 2021.

== Plot ==
Set in Nanjō, Okinawa, The Aquatope on White Sand tells the story of two girls; Kukuru Misakino, who is chasing her dream by working at an aquarium, and Fūka Miyazawa, an idol from Tokyo who has given up her position and journeyed to Okinawa in search of something new.

== Characters ==
=== Main ===
Kukuru Misakino (海咲野 くくる, Misakino Kukuru)
Voiced by: Miku Itō
A high school student who works at Gama Gama Aquarium as its Deputy Director. She is determined to save the aquarium with creativity and hard work. Her love for sea creatures knows no bounds and she is known for being a sea creature geek. She lives with her grandparents as her parents died when she was young. After the closure of Gama Gama Aquarium, she graduates high school and landed a job at Tingarla Aquarium through a recommendation by her grandfather, only to be placed in the PR and marketing department by its director. While working at Tingarla Aquarium she is given the nickname "Plankton" by the vice director.
Fuuka Miyazawa (宮沢 風花, Miyazawa Fūka)
Voiced by: Rikako Aida
A former idol who has given up on her dream for the sake of another member and escaped to Okinawa. Her former fame troubled her, as did her decision of sacrificing her idol career, but Gama Gama Aquarium quickly became her safe haven and her new-found passion. After the closure of Gama Gama Aquarium, she went back to her hometown in Iwate. Although she was offered a movie role to revive her entertainment career, she returns instead to Okinawa to work at Tingarla Aquarium as a caretaker in the Aquatic Animals Department.
Tsukimi Teruya (照屋 月美, Teruya Tsukimi)
Voiced by: Azumi Waki
Kukuru's childhood friend. She helps her mother with running her local diner, Kamee. She is nicknamed "Udon-chan" because her name happens to be a type of an udon, tsukimi udon. After graduation, she works part-time at a diner called Ohana as training, while her mother takes over Kamee.
Karin Kudaka (久高 夏凛, Kudaka Karin)
Voiced by: Lynn
An office lady who is working on helping the city increase its tourists. She is close to Kukuru, and quickly warmed up to Fūka after their first encounter. After the closure of Gama Gama, she decided to quit her job and landed a job at Tingarla Aquarium, being in the same department as Kukuru.
Kai Nakamura (仲村 櫂, Nakamura Kai)
Voiced by: Shimba Tsuchiya
Kukuru's childhood friend. He often helps his father who is a fisherman and decided to work part-time at Gama Gama Aquarium help Kukuru in her efforts to prevent it from closing down. After graduation, he landed a job at Tingarla Aquarium together with Kukuru in the Aquatic Animals Department. It is strongly implied that he has feelings for Kukuru. He also has a younger sister named Maho.
Kuuya Yakamashi (屋嘉間志 空也, Yakamashi Kūya)
Voiced by: Yōhei Azakami
A worker at Gama Gama Aquarium. Cold and aloof, though often complaining about the tremendous workload given by Kukuru, he is strongly passionate about his work, though he does not show it at all times. Due to past circumstances, he is also known to be bad at dealing with women—and is often more energetic upon consuming alcohol or being around the guys. After the closure of Gama Gama Aquarium, he gets transferred to Tingarla Aquarium through the recommendation of Gama Gama Aquarium's director.

=== Tingarla Aquarium Staff ===
Chiyu Haebaru (南風原 知夢, Haebaru Chiyu)
Voiced by: Yui Ishikawa
A staff from Tingarla Aquarium, an aquarium that is scheduled to open in the city center following the closure of Gama Gama Aquarium. She was assigned to train at Gama Gama Aquarium. Having continuously put up with Kukuru's biased behavior, she concludes that the training at Gama Gama Aquarium is ineffective for her, someone who undertook countless hours of training to achieve her dream job. She eventually decides to move to another aquarium to continue her training due to this. It is revealed later on that her desperation towards her job stems from her past experiences where she has lost her job at another aquarium due to her unable to manage her full time job while raising her child as a single mother
Kaoru Shimabukuro (島袋 薫, Shimabukuro Kaoru)
Voiced by: Mikako Komatsu
A fish caretaker at Tingarla Aquarium who used to study together with Chiyu. She is often mistaken for being a man for her tomboyish appearance and behavior. She is also passionate about environmental issues and ends up being selected for the special training course in Hawaii.
Akari Maeda (真栄田 朱里, Maeda Akari)
Voiced by: Kiyono Yasuno
She is a university student who works part-time at the Tingarla Aquarium office and has a friendly personality.
Marina Yonekura (米倉 マリナ, Yonekura Marina)
Voiced by: Nao Tōyama
A friendly girl and penguin breeder. She's a Venezuelan descent who at first has difficulty with speaking in Japanese, so she chose to work at aquarium because she doesn't need to talk to communicate with the sea creatures.
Eiji Higa (比嘉 瑛士, Higa Eiji)
Voiced by: Yūsuke Nagano
He got a job at the Tingarla Aquarium as a fish breeder after finishing graduate school. He is also a sea creature geek and often relates the people around him with sea creatures, seeing things in context of marine life.
Akira Hoshino (星野 晃, Hoshino Akira)
Voiced by: Masaki Terasoma
The director of Tingarla Aquarium from Hawaii and an acquaintance of Kukuru's grandfather, who has a cheerful personality towards the staff and customers.
Tetsuji Suwa (諏訪 哲司, Suwa Tetsuji)
Voiced by: Satoshi Hino
A tough, no-nonsense vice director who works in the sales department and does not show much emotion. He is a former banker.
Bondo Garandō (雅藍洞 凡人, Garandō Bondo)
Voiced by: Shūhei Sakaguchi
The breeding manager who is calm and friendly in stark contrast to the vice president's serious attitude during office hours.

=== Others ===
Ojii (おじい, Ojī)
Voiced by: Hiroshi Yanaka
The director of Gama Gama Aquarium and Kukuru's grandfather. When he took over Gama Gama Aquarium, he never knew what to do with the place. While intending to let go of the aquarium, he also considered letting Kukuru take her chances at reviving the place.

== Production and release ==
The Aquatope on White Sand was announced on January 15, 2021. The series was directed by Toshiya Shinohara and written by Yūko Kakihara. It features character designs by U35 and Yuki Akiyama, and music by Yoshiaki Dewa. It aired from July 9 to December 17, 2021, on Tokyo MX and other channels. (Note: Tokyo MX listed the series premiere at 24:00 on July 8, 2021, which is at midnight on July 9.) The first opening theme, "Tayutae, Nanairo" (たゆたえ、七色; lit. 'Sway, Seven Colors'), was performed by Arcana Project, while the first ending theme, "Tsukiumi no Yurikago" (月海の揺り籠; lit. 'Moon Ocean's Cradle'), was performed by Mia Regina. Arcana Project also performed the second opening theme "Tomedonai Shiosai ni Bokutachi wa Nani o Utau darō ka" (とめどない潮騒に僕たちは何を歌うだろうか; lit. 'What We Sing in the Unstoppable Tide'), while Risa Aizawa from Dempagumi.inc performed the second ending theme "Shingetsu no Da Capo" (新月のダ・カーポ; lit. 'New Moon's Da Capo'). Crunchyroll streamed the series outside of Asia. Muse Communication licensed the series in South and Southeast Asia. The series ran for 24 episodes.

=== Episode list ===
| No. | Title (Note: All English titles are taken from Crunchyroll.) | Directed by (Note: Information is taken from the ending credits of each episode.) | Written by | Storyboarded by | Original release date |
|---|---|---|---|---|---|
| 1 | "The Tropical Fish Ran Away"; Transliteration: "Nettaigyo, Nigeta" (Japanese: 熱帯魚、逃げた) | Yasuo Fujii | Yūko Kakihara | Toshiya Shinohara | July 9, 2021 |
Kukuru Misakino is a high school girl who loves sea creatures. Her head is full of thoughts about the Gama Gama Aquarium, where she is the acting director. In order to protect the aquarium, which is approaching its demise, she works hard even during the summer break. On the other hand, Fūka Miyazawa, who quit her job as an idol, comes to Okinawa with no idea where she is going, but she is guided to the Gama Gama Aquarium by Karin Kudaka, a member of the tourist association, who happens to be passing by. When Fūka experiences something strange in front of the aquarium, Kukuru asks her.
| 2 | "Getting Wet Is Part of the Job"; Transliteration: "Nureru no mo Shigoto no Uchi" (Japanese: 濡れるのも仕事のうち) | Tomoaki Ōta | Yūko Kakihara | Masahiro Andō | July 16, 2021 |
Kukuru's grandpa and grandma welcome Fūka to work at the Gama Gama Aquarium and she moves in with the Misakino family. As the aquarium is approaching its demise, Kukuru shows more and more enthusiasm for her job, saying that this summer break is her last shot to rebuild the aquarium. The next day, Fūka learns from Kukuru how hard it is to work at the aquarium, and the two of them put on a penguin feeding show together.
| 3 | "Life Begins in the Ocean"; Transliteration: "Inochi wa, Umi Kara" (Japanese: いのちは、海から) | Tetsuo Ichimura | Yūko Kakihara | Tetsuo Ichimura | July 23, 2021 |
Kukuru and Fūka are getting to know each other a little better. When Kukuru's grandpa is away on a business trip, they decide to weigh the penguins together. Fūka does her job so well that the feeling she had when feeding the penguins doesn't haunt her. Meanwhile, Kukuru notices something wrong with one of the penguins. She becomes anxious with the responsibility of dealing with the creatures's lives, and cannot wait for her grandpa's return, so she decides to consult with Doctor Takeshita, a veterinarian on maternity leave.
| 4 | "Tropical Fish in Boots"; Transliteration: "Nagagutsu o Haita Nettaigyo" (Japanese: 長靴をはいた熱帯魚) | Yuriko Abe | Misuzu Chiba | Tensai Okamura | July 30, 2021 |
Gama Gama Aquarium has decided to hold a touch pool event where visitors can directly interact with marine creatures. Kukuru is so excited for the event, which will be the highlight of the summer break, that she quickly gives instructions to the staff, including one of the Sea Queens, Kūya Yakamashi, and her childhood friend, Kai Nakamura. On the other hand, Fūka, who has been assigned to be a guide, prepares her best for the event, even though she feels uneasy about standing in front of people. At that time, Gousuke Guden, another Sea Queen who knows that Fūka is a former idol, comes back from sick leave.
| 5 | "Mother Arrives"; Transliteration: "Haha no Raihō" (Japanese: 母の来訪) | Shuu Honma | Yūko Kakihara | Tensai Okamura | August 6, 2021 |
Fūka's mother, Eri, comes to take her daughter home from Gama Gama Aquarium. However, Fūka doesn't want to go home yet and with Kukuru's help, she escapes from her mother. With nowhere else to go, Fūka stops by Kame Eatery, where Tsukimi Teruya, a friend of Kukuru's, helps her. Meanwhile, Kukuru, who is left behind, is carrying out various strategies to stop Eri in her tracks.
| 6 | "Sweets Rhapsody"; Transliteration: "Suītsu Rapusodi" (Japanese: スイーツラプソディ) | Yasuyuki Ōishi | Misuzu Chiba | Toshiya Shinohara | August 13, 2021 |
Gama Gama Aquarium is closing at the end of August and Kukuru is getting nervous. She desperately tries to think of ways to attract visitors, but none of them seem to work. Then, Fūka's words inspire her to try making original sweets as an attraction. With Tsukimi's help, the three work hard to develop a new specialty for Gama Gama Aquarium. After that, they decide on the menu and the idea seems to be going well.
| 7 | "Ice Cream Toast"; Transliteration: "Aisu de Kanpai" (Japanese: アイスで乾杯) | Mitsutaka Noshitani | Yūko Kakihara | Masahiro Andō | August 20, 2021 |
Thanks to the efforts of Kukuru and the others, the number of visitors to Gama Gama Aquarium is increasing. Kukuru is pleased with the results and is even more determined to stop the aquarium from closing. However, she gets into trouble with Kūya because of her reckless proposal. Unable to bear witness to the situation, Grandpa gives the staff a day off to relax for a while. The next day, they come to the beach with Karin and Tsukimi, and enjoy their day off with barbecues and sea games, until an unexpected guest joins them as well.
| 8 | "Crab Crisis" | Yasuo Fujii | Misuzu Chiba | Tetsuo Ichimura | August 27, 2021 |
Gama Gama Aquarium has been chosen to host a mobile aquarium event, which will take the creatures for a visit to a hospital through the efforts of Karin. On the day of the event, the caretakers prepare for the event at the hospital. On the way, Kukuru and Karin go to greet the head nurse, Kinjo. However, Kinjo's words lead to an awkward atmosphere between them. On the other hand, Fūka, who is preparing for the event, notices that a crab, which is forbidden to be brought into the mobile aquarium, is mixed in. She tries to hide it before the hospital staff finds it.
| 9 | "Cinderella, the Spy"; Transliteration: "Shikaku no Shinderera" (Japanese: 刺客のシンデレラ) | Akira Takamura | Yūko Kakihara | Masahiro Andō | September 3, 2021 |
A new caretaker, Chiyu Haebaru, arrives for training from Tingarla Aquarium, which is under construction. On the instructions of her grandfather, Kukuru is given the job of being Chiyu's coach. However, she doesn't approve of the new aquarium and sees Chiyu as a rival, testing her every step of the way. They still can't get along with each other after that, so they start walking the penguins with Fūka.
| 10 | "Abandoned Illusions"; Transliteration: "Okizari no Maboroshi" (Japanese: 置き去りの幻) | Noriyoshi Sasaki | Yuka Yamada | Jong Heo | September 10, 2021 |
As the aquarium is about to close, Kukuru looks for a breakthrough idea to turn the tide. She proposes to advertise the illusion happening in the aquarium that Fūka has seen before. However, Karin and the others are opposed to the idea, saying that they cannot advertise something that is uncertain. Still, Kukuru is not ready to give up and begins to search for a way to ensure that the illusion can be seen by anyone. Meanwhile, Fūka is troubled to learn that she has been offered a main role in a film.
| 11 | "At the End of the Siege"; Transliteration: "Rōjō no Hate" (Japanese: 籠城の果て) | Yuriko Abe | Misuzu Chiba | Yoshiyuki Asai | September 17, 2021 |
One day in August, a typhoon is approaching Nanjō City. In order to appeal against the closure of the aquarium, Kukuru locks herself in Gama Gama Aquarium. Fūka, worried about Kukuru, rushes to the aquarium and locks herself there as well. However, Kukuru's attitude towards Fūka, who is concerned about her future, is not straightforward. As the typhoon intensifies, the power goes out at the aquarium, and they look around to see if there is anything wrong with the tanks or the creatures.
| 12 | "Our Oceans Are Endless"; Transliteration: "Watashitachi no Umi wa Owaranai" (Japanese: 私たちの海は終わらない) | Chihaya Tanaka; Tomoaki Ōta | Yūko Kakihara | Tensai Okamura | September 24, 2021 |
It's the last day of business at Gama Gama Aquarium and there are many visitors. The aquarium is in full swing, and the staff are doing their best at work, making memories for the last time. The little aquarium closes amidst the smiles and excitement of many people. After the farewell party, Kukuru and Fūka talk about their future plans that night. They will decide their own path for themselves.
| 13 | "Tingarla in the Far Away Ocean"; Transliteration: "Umi no Haruka na Tingāra" (Japanese: 海の遥かなティンガーラ) | Tomoaki Ōta | Yūko Kakihara | Masahiro Andō | October 1, 2021 |
In the spring of the following year, months have passed since the closing of Gama Gama Aquarium. After graduating from high school, Kukuru gets a job at Tingarla Aquarium. She wants to be a caretaker at her new job, but for some reason she is assigned to the sales department. Unable to sort out her feelings, she goes to her new job, where she is met by Tetsuji Suwa, the vice director of the aquarium. She also meets Chiyu, who used to come to Gama Gama Aquarium for training.
| 14 | "Penguin Chaser"; Transliteration: "Pengin Cheisā" (Japanese: ペンギンチェイサー) | Tetsuo Ichimura | Yuka Yamada | Tetsuo Ichimura | October 8, 2021 |
Fūka, who has returned to Okinawa, greets the depressed Kukuru whose work is not going well. The next day, Kukuru is given the task by Tetsuji Suwa to prepare for the backyard tour and asks Chiyu and her colleague, Kaoru Shimabukuro, and other caretakers for their cooperation to hold the tour in a week.
| 15 | "The Great Sea Slug Debate"; Transliteration: "Umiushi Dai Ronsen" (Japanese: ウミウシ大論戦) | Akira Takamura | Misuzu Chiba | Akira Takamura | October 15, 2021 |
Kukuru is ordered by Tetsuji Suwa to come up with an idea for a special exhibition that has been hastily decided to be held. With Fūka's words, saying "it would mean a chance to have the visitors know more about the creatures", this leads Kukuru to tackle the project positively. The next day, she proposes various plans to Tetsuji Suwa, and among them, a plan for a sea slug exhibition is adopted. However, there are many problems waiting for the sea slug exhibition, one of them being that sea slugs are hard to take care.
| 16 | "Shout-Out to the Tattered"; Transliteration: "Kizu-darake no Kimi ni Ēru o" (Japanese: 傷だらけの君にエールを) | Mitsutaka Noshitani | Yūko Kakihara | Fumie Muroi | October 22, 2021 |
The penguin eggs are about to hatch at Tingarla Aquarium. Fūka and the other penguin caretakers have to stay overnight to watch over the hatching of the new life. However, for some reason, only Chiyu is exempted from the overnight shift. Kukuru is not convinced that only Chiyu is being given special treatment, but then she hears from the head of the Breeding Department, Bondo Garandō, that Chiyu is hiding something from everyone.
| 17 | "Hangout Spot Kuragefuu"; Transliteration: "Kutsurogi Dokoro Kuragefū" (Japanese: くつろぎ処 海月風) | Fumihiko Suganuma | Misuzu Chiba | Tensai Okamura | October 29, 2021 |
It's been a while since they have had a day off together, so Kukuru, Fūka and Tsukimi decide to hold a gathering with the staff of Tingarla Aquarium. They serve food to Akari Maeda, a part-time worker in the Sales Department, and Marina Yonekura, a caretaker, and make them feel relaxed. Later, Chiyu and Kaoru, who have just finished working, join them, as well as Kūya, Kai and their colleague, Eiji Higa, and enjoy a lively holiday.
| 18 | "When the Light Shines"; Transliteration: "Akari no Tomoru Toki" (Japanese: あかりの灯るとき) | Hayato Sakai | Yuka Yamada | Masakazu Hashimoto | November 5, 2021 |
As proposed by Akari, a cosplay event where staff members dress up in costumes related to sea creatures and greet the visitors has been approved. However, due to Tetsuji Suwa's decision, Kukuru and Karin are put in charge of the preparations instead of Akari, who is only a part-timer. Kukuru tries to get Akari to like the aquarium's creatures, but Akari is not interested in them at all. Then, on the night before the event, it turns out that the fish stickers that were to be given out on the day of the event have not been ordered yet.
| 19 | "Goodbye, High Heels"; Transliteration: "Sayonara Hai Hīru" (Japanese: さよならハイヒール) | Noriyoshi Sasaki | Hitomi Ogawa | Noriyoshi Sasaki | November 12, 2021 |
Tingarla Aquarium has decided to film a documentary about a penguin chick. On the day before the shooting, the crew of the show and Fūka's junior from her idol days, Luka Shiroi, arrive at Tingarla Aquarium to take a look around. Fūka is happy to see her junior again, but the director of the show suggests that she and Luka appear on the show as reporters. Fūka tries to refuse, but she sees Luka looking anxious.
| 20 | "Lost Plankton"; Transliteration: "Maigo no Purankuton" (Japanese: 迷子のプランクトン) | Tetsuo Ichimura | Yūko Kakihara | Tetsuo Ichimura | November 19, 2021 |
In preparation for the opening of the new area, Kukuru is overwhelmed with a huge amount of work. In the meantime, she hears from Kūya that a wild dolphin has wandered onto the beach nearby. When she goes to check it out, she runs into Grandpa who has also come to see the dolphin. She is shocked to hear from Grandpa that the demolition of Gama Gama Aquarium will begin soon. However, before she has time to sort out his feelings, Tetsuji Suwa entrusts her with a new project.
| 21 | "Dreams of Blue Turtles"; Transliteration: "Burū Tātoru no Yume" (Japanese: ブルー・タートルの夢) | Tomonori Mine | Yasuhiro Nakanishi | Masahiro Andō | November 26, 2021 |
Kukuru's work is not going well and when she goes to see the now demolished Gama Gama Aquarium, she is shocked. The next day, she is absent from work without official leave, and goes to a remote island, where she meets Misaki Guden, a sea turtle researcher and conservationist, who also happens to be Gousuke's wife. Kukuru helps Misaki with her work and decides to watch over the sea turtles as they hatch. On the other hand, Fūka can't concentrate on her work because she is worried about Kukuru. Meanwhile, something strange happens to the Cape penguins that Fūka is in charge of keeping.
| 22 | "Ready to Return"; Transliteration: "Kakugo no Kikan" (Japanese: 覚悟の帰還) | Chihaya Tanaka | Misuzu Chiba | Tensai Okamura | December 3, 2021 |
After witnessing the hatching of the sea turtles, Kukuru returns to Tingarla Aquarium with a renewed spirit. Karin and Akari warmly welcome her back and Tetsuji Suwa continues to let her handle the plan for the wedding ceremony in the new area. While Kukuru struggles to come up with a suitable idea for the wedding at first, with the help of Chiyu and the others, she finally completes the proposal. Then comes the day to present the proposal to Miura, the wedding planner and will accept Kukuru's proposal.
| 23 | "The Future of the Aquarium"; Transliteration: "Suizokukan no Mirai" (Japanese: 水族館の未来) | Yuriko Abe | Yuka Yamada | Yuriko Abe | December 10, 2021 |
Akira Hoshino, the director of Tingarla Aquarium, announces a large project to study more about marine life and tackle environmental issues. Fūka, who has heard from Misaki that many sea turtles are dying due to ocean pollution, is strongly interested in the project. However, when she is told that the condition for participating in the project is a two-year training program in Hawaii, she reconsiders her participation, not wanting to be away from Kukuru. On the other hand, Kukuru has an interview with Akira Hoshino to discuss her transfer to the Breeding Department. During the interview, she hears about Tetsuji Suwa's past from him.
| 24 | "The Aquatope on White Sand"; Transliteration: "Shiroi Suna no Akuatōpu" (Japanese: 白い砂のアクアトープ) | Tomoaki Ōta; Toshiya Shinohara | Yūko Kakihara | Yuriko Abe; Toshiya Shinohara | December 17, 2021 |
The staff of Tingarla Aquarium are working hard to prepare for the wedding planned by Kukuru and the pre-opening of the new area. The preparations bear fruit and on the day of the event, the venue is filled with smiling faces of the bride, groom and visitors. After successfully completing the big project, Kukuru and Fūka go their separate ways. As they embark on a new path, a gentle miracle happens once again.

== Reception ==
Reviews of the series have been positive. David Lynn of Collider, described the series as ringing true, in the case of Fūka, to "the feeling of being lost and trying to find something" to attach yourself to, and praised Kukuru as acting as Fūka's foil, saying she represents "the feeling of pursuing a vague future you want but can't completely define." He concluded that the show captures the "feeling of being between stages of life, lost but searching." Mercedez Clewis, reviewing the show's first two episodes, wrote on Anime News Network that she enjoyed the episodes, believing that the show can deliver on its combination of various elements, and saying she has "high hopes for this series", and thought that the show has "the potential to be one of the most beautiful new series this season." She also argued that she considered the series to be "yuri-coded". In reviews of episodes 3–5, Clewis praised the magical realism of the series, how it "captures living in a rural part of Japan," is optimistic, the well-done story, and reads the cast as having "bits of queerness."

Christy Gibbs of CBR argued that the series "leans hard on themes such as environmentalism and sustainability," with the aquarium playing a big part in this narrative. Gibbs also said that the series uses "friendly environmentalism, small-town nostalgia, and ...[a] close-knit community" to its advantage, with viewers seeing the aquarium as the center of the series and a "magical place that brings people together and grants supernatural visions."

== Franchise ==
=== Local promotion ===
The Nanjo Sightseeing Information Center in Nanjō, Okinawa, Japan and souvenir shop across the street have cardboard cut-outs of the show's characters, with the shop including an "entire Aquatope corner."
