= WWE Network =

Defunct WWE produced subscription network

- Screenshot
- Company type: Division
- Website type: OTT video streaming platform
- Available in: List: Arabic; Chinese (Mandarin); English; French; German; Hindi; Indonesian; Japanese; Korean; Portuguese; Russian; Spanish; Tagalog
- Dissolved: April 1, 2026; 7 months ago
- Predecessor: WWE Classics on Demand
- Successors: WWE Vault; Club WWE
- Headquarters: Stamford, Connecticut, U.S.
- Country of origin: United States
- Area served: Worldwide (excluding Mainland China, Cuba, Iran, Liechtenstein, North Korea, Syria, Russia and the occupied territories); 39 countries (Note: Specifically, as of January 2026: Argentina, Australia, Belgium, Brazil, Cambodia, Canada, Chile, Colombia, Czech Republic, Denmark, Dominican Republic, Ecuador, Egypt, Finland, France, Greece, Hong Kong, Hungary, India, Indonesia, Israel, Italy, Japan, Kuwait, Malaysia, Mexico, Netherlands, New Zealand, Norway, Peru, Philippines, Poland, Portugal, Romania, Saudi Arabia, Singapore, Slovakia, South Korea, Spain, Sweden, Taiwan, Thailand, Turkey, Ukraine, United Kingdom) (via Netflix); United States (via ESPN, (Note: Main roster premium live events only starting September 2025.) Netflix, (Note: Streaming rights for WWE Raw and its video library) and Peacock (Note: Streaming rights for Saturday Night's Main Event, WWE SmackDown and NXT premium live events (to March 15, 2026).)); Sub-Saharan Africa (via SuperSport)
- Owners: WWE (TKO Group Holdings)
- Products: Streaming media; video on demand; digital distribution
- Revenue: ▲US$49.4 million (Q2 2020)
- Website: network.wwe.com
- Commercial: Yes
- Registration: Required
- Users: ▼1.49 million (Q4 2020)
- Launched: February 24, 2014; 12 years ago
- Current status: Inactive as of April 1, 2026

WWE Network was a subscription video on-demand over-the-top streaming service and digital television network owned by the American professional wrestling promotion WWE, a division of TKO Group Holdings. The service primarily carried the company's library content, including past television programming and pay-per-view and livestreaming events from the promotion and other companies that had been acquired by WWE (such as World Championship Wrestling), original programming (including documentaries and in-ring programming), as well as streaming of WWE pay-per-view events at no additional charge.

The service relied on technology developed by MLB Advanced Media and BAMTech, prior to Endeavor Streaming assuming technical operations of the service in 2019. Although it operated primarily as a standalone service, the distribution model of the WWE Network varied by market, where it could have been available as an integrated service through licensing agreements with third-party providers, depending on the markets. The standalone service contained a premium and a free tier.

WWE Network launched on February 24, 2014, in the United States, as a digital successor to the WWE Classics on Demand service. It launched in Canada in July of that year and expanded to the Asia–Pacific region and select European countries in August. The United Kingdom received the service in February 2015, and was made available in the Middle East and parts of Africa that March, and to India in November. It was launched in additional European and Asian countries in January 2016. Upon launch, the WWE Network was met with positive reception of its content library, but was criticized for technical problems. The service had 1.5 million subscribers by October 30, 2020.

Beginning in 2021, WWE began to phase out the WWE Network, as the company reached multiple agreements with streaming services as domestic rightsholders (such as Peacock in the United States, Binge in Australia, and Abema in Japan) to carry its content instead. In 2024, WWE then announced an agreement with Netflix, under which it will hold the streaming rights to its content internationally beginning in January 2025; the agreement was part of one that granted Netflix the rights to WWE Raw in the United States and internationally. WWE Network ceased standalone operations in the vast majority of its remaining countries as of January 1, 2025. From 2024, WWE started uploading library content including full shows and other archive content to YouTube via the WWE Vault channel, and in 2025 started uploading World Championship Wrestling library content and NXT library content to their own dedicated YouTube channels.

The WWE Network permanently shut down on April 1, 2026, after Austria, Germany, Italy, and Switzerland, the last four countries that still had the standalone service, transitioned to Netflix.

== History ==
=== Development and American launch ===
The origins of the WWE Network can trace back to 2000 when USA Network filed a lawsuit against the World Wrestling Federation (WWF, known as WWE since 2002) due to a breach of contract which saw most of its programming moved to Viacom-owned TNN and MTV. The Delaware Court of Chancery ruled in favor of the WWF in June 2000. Then CEO Linda McMahon revealed that WWF wanted its own cable network and testified that before WWF signed a rights deal with Viacom, the company had floated the idea of acquiring USA's Sci-Fi Channel, and reformatting it as a dedicated wrestling network. USA executives rejected the idea, and McMahon said that former USA Networks President Barry Baker encouraged her to talk to other programmers about potential deals. " 'I can tell you right now, Linda, you're not going to get anybody to give you a network,' " McMahon quoted Baker in her testimony. In 2005, USA Network re-acquired the rights to all WWE programming.

In September 2011, WWE officially announced plans to launch the WWE Network in 2012 as a pay-TV channel. WWE then conducted a survey asking people if they would pay for the WWE Network if it were a premium channel. In an email sent to WWE fans who might be interested in the WWE Network, WWE surveyed fans for their thoughts about the WWE Network airing WWE's pay-per-views to subscribers for no additional charge. The survey also noted that feature repeats of Raw and SmackDown, as well as footage from World Championship Wrestling (WCW), Extreme Championship Wrestling (ECW), National Wrestling Alliance, XFL, Smoky Mountain Wrestling (SMW), American Wrestling Association (AWA), and WWE films would also make the lineup. Original programming was also noted in the survey.

WWE Network logo with background

As the result of an online poll, WrestleMania Rewind was chosen as a name for a new WWE Network show on October 17, 2011. The original launch date was set for April 1, 2012, which would have coincided with WrestleMania XXVIII, and WWE's official website featured a countdown clock that would have expired on April 1. The clock was quietly removed, and the network did not launch as advertised. WWE chief marketing officer Michelle Wilson allayed fears about the future of the WWE Network, saying "There will be a WWE network in some shape or form. We are in late-stage negotiations with distributors", and confirmed that WWE Legends' House had been filmed. In April 2013, WWE had switched plans and aimed to release the WWE Network as a premium pay-TV outlet, with a potential price of $15 a month. On Old School Raw in January 2014, WWE ran teasers promoting an announcement on January 8 at the Consumer Electronics Show in Las Vegas, later confirming that the announcement concerned the WWE Network. At the Consumer Electronics Show, WWE revealed a comprehensive plan which would see a launch date of February 24, 2014, in the United States. WWE Classics on Demand closed on January 31, 2014, to make way for the WWE Network. A free trial period was offered during the week of the launch. At the time of the launch, archival programming from WCW, ECW, SMW, AWA, and Jim Crockett Promotions (JCP), amongst other promotions owned by WWE Libraries Inc., was included on the service. The logo initially used for the WWE Network eventually became the standard logo used by the WWE corporation in August 2014.

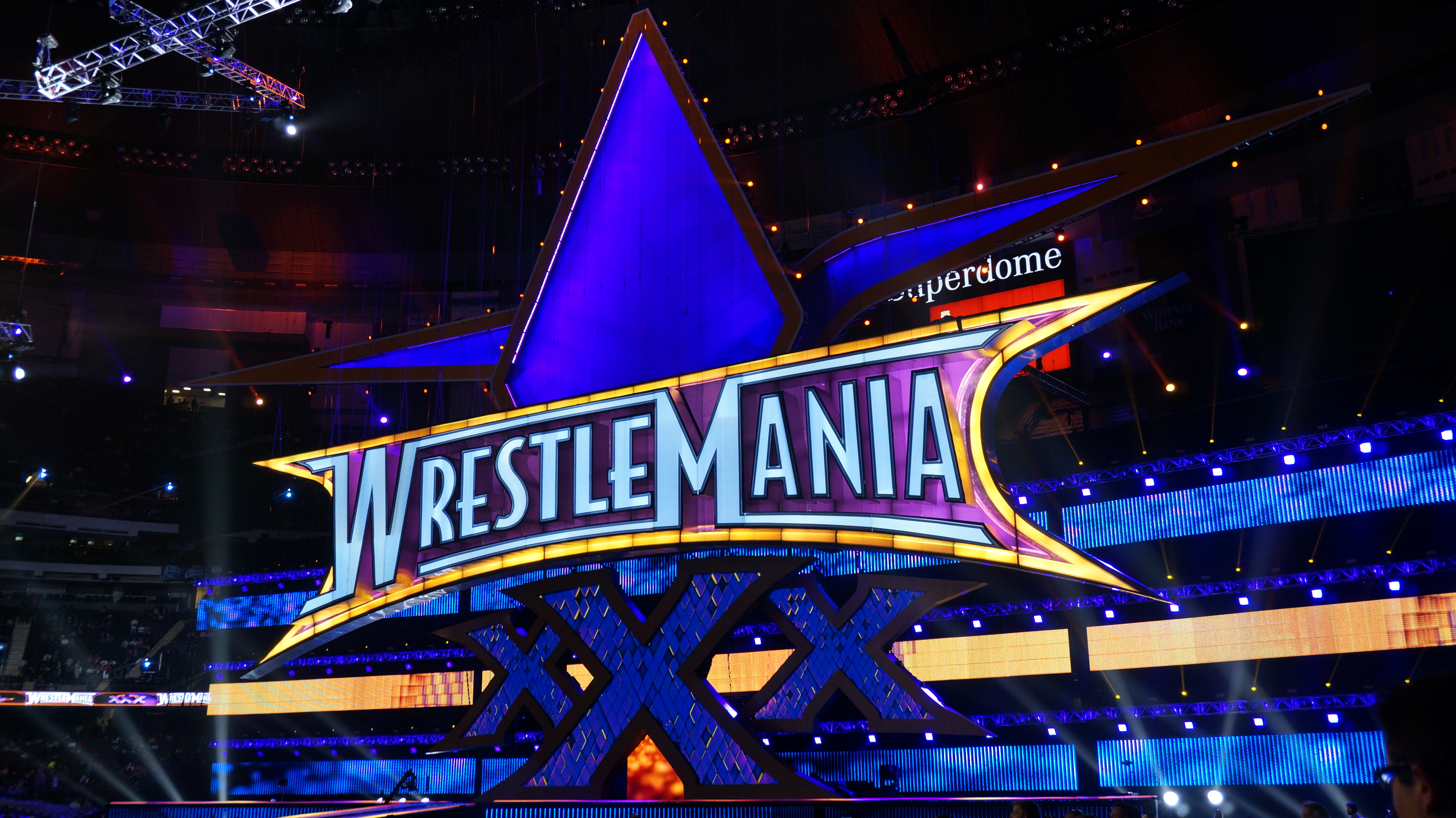
WrestleMania XXX was the first pay-per-view to stream on the network

In April 2014, ahead of WrestleMania XXX, the Network received acclaim, with The New York Times saying that WWE had "positioned themselves on the cutting edge of Internet television". Later that month, the company announced that the network had 667,000 subscribers, short of the one million subscribers they needed to break even. As WWE's stock fell 50% the following month, Forbes described low subscription numbers as being of "additional concern" for investors after WWE's underwhelming NBCUniversal renewal deal. WWE offered a second free preview week of the WWE Network, which started July 7, in an attempt to sign new subscribers. A second report released at the end of July indicated that the network had reached 700,000 subscribers. WWE's goal was to reach one million subscribers by the end of 2014.

=== Expansion ===
On July 31, 2014, the company announced a 10-year, Canadian distribution deal for WWE content with Rogers Media (owner of Sportsnet 360, the historic carrier of WWE programming in Canada), which was to see the company distribute WWE Network as a premium television service. Also on that date, it was announced that the WWE Network would launch in Australia, New Zealand, Hong Kong, Singapore, Mexico, Spain, and the Nordics, among others on August 12, with Italian, Arab, German, Japanese, Indian, Chinese, Thai, and Malaysian launches planned for a later date. On October 30, 2014, in an attempt to increase subscription numbers from an announced figure of 731,000, the 6-month subscription requirement was dropped, allowing subscribers the option to cancel at any time. WWE had originally planned to launch the network on October 1 in the United Kingdom, but was delayed for a further month. The launch was confirmed to be taking place at 8 p.m. on November 3; however, 20 minutes prior to the launch, WWE announced that it had been indefinitely delayed. Vince McMahon publicly apologized for the delay. It was announced on January 4, 2015, that the WWE Network would be launching in the UK and Ireland on January 19, 2015, priced at £9.99 and €12.99, respectively, although some customers managed to register as early as January 13.

On January 27, 2015, WWE announced that the WWE Network had reached 1 million subscribers, with Vince McMahon saying that WWE would "remain focused on delivering an outstanding value proposition for our fans by adding new content and new features in the coming year." On February 12, 2015, WWE announced a five-year partnership with television provider OSN to bring the WWE Network to the Middle East and North Africa as a premium service. On March 31, 2019, all OSN Sports channels were shut down and WWE content stopped airing on OSN services. A year later, WWE announced the Network content would be accessible in the MENA region directly through WWE services with no regional television provider or streaming service involved. On March 23, 2022, Shahid and WWE announced a partnership that eventually ended by the beginning of 2025 as currently all rights to WWE content in the region belong to Netflix.

On July 30, 2015, WWE revealed the number of subscribers for the Network at 1.156 million. This was announced as a part of WWE's financial reporting on the second quarter of the year, which had resulted in their stock price rising past $20.00 after closing on the previous day at $16.48. The total of 1.156 million paid subscribers marked a 13% decrease from the 1.315 million paid subscribers that was stated in the reports for the first quarter of 2015. WWE also revealed, including trial subscribers, they had 1.227 million Network users at the end of the second quarter, and over the entire lifespan of the Network, there have been over 2 million unique subscribers.

The WWE Network launched in India on November 2, 2015. On November 19, a report by market research and consulting firm Park Associates announced that the WWE Network had broken into the top five streaming services and trailed only MLB.tv in the sports category. WWE announced the network would launch in Germany, Switzerland, Austria, and Japan on January 5, 2016, followed by Thailand and the Philippines on February 29, 2016.

In April 2017, WWE announced a total of 1.949 million subscribers to the WWE Network, of which 1.661 million were paid subscribers. At the end of the third quarter of 2017, the number had dropped to 1.5 million paid users. In April 2018, WWE announced subscriber growth had reached 2.1 million, with 1.8 million paid. At the end of the third quarter of 2018, the number had dropped to 1.6 million paid users.

=== Switch to Endeavor and redesign ===
In January 2019, WWE Network signed with Endeavor Streaming to replace BAMTech as its operating partner. WWE's decision was motivated by the acquisition of BAMTech by Disney. Co-president George Barrios cited concerns over how BAMTech's relationships with third-party partners would be impacted by the sale, while WWE also sought greater control over the service and its operations, intending to partner with another vendor or take the service entirely in-house. The company decided to partner with Endeavor Streaming (formed primarily from the assets of NeuLion) to provide infrastructure and billing services, and Massive Interactive to develop a new front-end and mobile apps.

The new WWE Network platform launched in July 2019, ahead of SummerSlam. It includes a revamped user experience, support for 1080p streams, new browsing tools (such as a new "Superstars" interface for filtering content by performers), and plans to add a download feature for offline viewing in the future. Support for PlayStation 3, Xbox 360, and selected legacy smart TVs was discontinued with the changeover. In an interview with The Verge, Barrios revealed that there were ongoing plans for WWE.com's existing video content to be integrated into the WWE Network platform as a "free" tier (possibly also including previews of WWE Network's premium content), and that WWE was also considering the development of a premium tier with additional features (such as benefits for other WWE operations).

In March 2020, amid the onset of the COVID-19 pandemic and to promote WrestleMania 36, WWE Network made a selection of its premium content and archives available free for a limited time. On June 1, 2020, WWE Network officially launched a free tier with 15,000 hours of content, which includes access to selected content such as recent episodes of its weekly programming, and original series such as Raw Talk, Monday Night War, and Ride Along. The service would be advertising-free, and was intended primarily to promote its weekly programs and pay-per-view events.

=== Global phase-out ===
On January 25, 2021, WWE announced that NBCUniversal Television and Streaming had acquired the exclusive U.S. distribution rights to WWE Network, and that the service would be folded into the NBCUniversal-owned streaming service Peacock on March 18, 2021 (ahead of Fastlane and WrestleMania 37). Existing and future WWE Network content will be hosted by a branded channel within the Peacock service, with the full service included as part of the paid Peacock Premium tier (which features a wider array of television, film, and sports programming), and a selection of WWE Network content (including some of its original series such as The Bump and Raw Talk, and episodes of Total Divas and Total Bellas from NBCUniversal cable channel E!) available within its free tier. WWE committed to produce a "signature documentary" for the service annually beginning in 2022.

After a transitional period, the standalone WWE Network ceased operations in the United States on April 4, 2021. To coincide with the introduction, Peacock announced plans to offer a four-month half-price promotion for new Premium subscribers. Not all content was available at launch, as the service's library was being audited to meet NBCUniversal standards and practices. WWE stated that the content migration would be completed by August 2021. This has included the removal of scenes/matches containing content inappropriate under current standards, with the most prominent example being a WrestleMania VI match where Roddy Piper painted half of his body black before facing African-American opponent Bad News Brown.

This agreement did not initially affect the WWE Network service outside of the United States, which continued to be marketed as a standalone offering through either WWE or its local partners. However, in 2022, WWE began to reach additional agreements to merge WWE Network into streaming services in other territories, including Disney+ Hotstar in Indonesia, Binge in Australia (as an extension of WWE's existing media rights agreement in Australia with Foxtel, which also saw a Foxtel-run WWE linear channel added to its services), Disney+ in the Philippines, and Abema in Japan.

On January 23, 2024, WWE announced an agreement with Netflix to hold the rights to Raw globally, and rights to Raw, SmackDown, NXT, documentaries, and pay-per-view and livestreaming events (referred to as Premium Live Events, or PLEs) outside of the United States, beginning in January 2025.

On November 22, 2024, an email was sent out to many subscribers confirming that the service would no longer be available in certain areas effective January 1, 2025. It was first sent out in United Kingdom, with this change also taking effect in other territories outside the United States, though a list of countries was not published in this statement. It was subsequently reported that WWE Network would remain active in a small number of international markets where Netflix could not yet assume rights due to conflicting contracts, and in fact was relaunching as a standalone service in the Philippines following the end of WWE's contract in the region with Disney+.

On December 20, 2024, WWE clarified that WWE Network would remain active as a standalone service into 2025 in France, Belgium, Germany, Austria, Switzerland, Italy, the Philippines, and Cambodia, while its content would remain available in a few other countries through local partner services. Netflix separately noted the countries where it would begin offering WWE content in January 2025, and said that additional countries would be added to its contract in 2026 and beyond. Gradually, the rollout of WWE on Netflix continued, launching in India on April 1, 2025; the Caribbean on August 1, 2025; and France, Belgium, South Korea, Cambodia, and the Philippines on January 1, 2026.

On August 6, 2025, WWE announced that its live events would move in the United States from Peacock to ESPN's streaming platform in 2026. It was not stated whether this agreement would include library content. However, on August 20, WWE and ESPN announced that the main roster live events would launch on September 20, beginning with Wrestlepalooza while NXT live events would continue to air on Peacock. Netflix then acquired the rights to the WWE library on January 6, 2026, while Peacock would retain the rights to NXT PLEs until March 15, 2026, and Saturday Night's Main Event and the SmackDown archive until at least 2029.

On March 4, 2026, emails were sent out to subscribers in Germany, Austria, Switzerland, and Italy—the remaining countries on the standalone WWE Network—notifying them that the service would permanently shut down on April 1, with these countries subsequently transitioning to Netflix. A conflicting report came out shortly after that Austria and Germany would not transition to Netflix and would instead be available through their respective partners such as ProSieben Maxx in Germany. Netflix clarified that PLEs in Austria and Germany would begin airing on the platform beginning April 1, while regular television programs would be available through local partners.

== Availability ==
WWE Network programming was available, either as a standalone service or through a partner service such as Peacock or Netflix, in 186 out of 193 United Nations member states (including all 27 European Union nations) and two observer states such as the Holy See and Palestine. It was also distributed through six non-UN countries: the Republic of China (Taiwan), the Cook Islands, Kosovo, Niue, Northern Cyprus, and SADR-claimed Western Sahara.

In late 2017, Liechtenstein and the People's Republic of China were added to the list of non-available countries, however, the WWE Network was still available in the PRC special administrative regions of Hong Kong and Macau as well as ROC-controlled Taiwan and Fujian. Until April 1, 2025, WWE Network was available in India as an add-on subscription through the SonyLIV streaming service. From April 1, 2025, it was merged into Netflix, except the Saturday Night's Main Event specials, which still air on Sony Liv and Sony Sports Network.

In December 2019, WWE renewed its agreements in Sub-Saharan Africa with SuperSport, adding a WWE-branded channel to DStv carrying WWE programs and WWE Network original series.

On January 27, 2022, it was announced that WWE Network would be available on Disney+ Hotstar in Indonesia at no additional costs to subscribers; it ended in 2024.

Amidst the ongoing invasion of Ukraine by the Russian military, WWE announced on March 3, 2022, that it had terminated the broadcasting relationship with Russia and shut down the WWE Network in the country, in line with the global sanctions imposed by the United States. The WWE Network service was also not available in the Russian-controlled regions of Crimea, Donetsk, Kherson, Luhansk, Zaporozhye, Transnistria, Abkhazia and South Ossetia.

On September 28, 2022, WWE announced an agreement with its Australian rightsholder Foxtel, which would see WWE Network merged into its streaming service Binge beginning in January 2023, with a launch later set for January 23, 2023. As part of the agreement, Foxtel's channel Fox8 continued to carry WWE programming, and Foxtel also introduced a new, WWE-branded linear channel. On October 20, 2022, it was announced that the WWE Network would move to Disney+ in the Philippines upon its launch on November 17, 2022; however, WWE's agreement with Disney+ ended two years later, following which WWE Network relaunched as a standalone service. In December 2025, Netflix announced that WWE content would be available in the Philippines starting January 2026.

On January 23, 2024, WWE announced an agreement with Netflix to hold the rights to Raw globally, and rights to Raw, SmackDown, NXT, documentaries, and pay-per-view events outside of the United States, beginning in January 2025. On December 21, 2024, WWE and Netflix clarified how WWE content would be distributed in each country in 2025 and beyond.

Distribution partners for WWE Network and Premium Live Events
Country/territory	Partner (main services)	Expiry	Refs.
United States	ESPN (Main Roster Premium Live Events)	2031	
United States	The CW (NXT Premium Live Events)	N/A	
United States	Peacock (Saturday Night's Main Event)	2029	
United States	Netflix (select library content)	December 2034 (Note: Based on nominal contract length of ten years. Netflix has options to opt out of the contract after five years (i.e., in December 2029), or extend it to twenty years (i.e., until December 2044).)	
Austria	ProSieben Maxx	March 2028	
Germany	ProSieben Maxx	March 2028	
Switzerland	ProSieben Maxx	March 2028	
Sub-Saharan Africa	MultiChoice (SuperSport)	N/A	
Other available countries	Netflix	December 2034 (Note: Based on nominal contract length of ten years. Netflix has options to opt out of the contract after five years (i.e., in December 2029), or extend it to twenty years (i.e., until December 2044).)	

== Programming ==
=== Original programming ===
==== WWE events ====
- All Premium Live Events.
- Pre-shows for Premium Live Events.
- Main Event – An in-ring program featuring talent from the Raw and NXT brands.
- Saturday Night's Main Event – A quarterly in-ring program airing on Peacock in the United States.

==== WWE Network shows ====
- Breaking News – Breaking news from WWE.
- Original Specials – A series of specials on the WWE Network.
- WWE Collections Spotlight – A preview show that offers a sampling of exclusive WWE Collections that are available on the WWE Network.
- WWE Hidden Gems – Rare content from WWE's video library. Previously offered through the WWE Network's Collections section, but moved to the Vault Section. Unavailable on the Peacock/US version.
- This Week in WWE – A weekly 30-minute recap of the past week's WWE programs, hosted by Scott Stanford and Megan Morant.
- WWE Raw Talk – A weekly post-show for WWE Raw, hosted by Megan Morant and Sam Roberts.
- WWE 24 – A documentary show that goes behind the scenes of WWE events and personnel.
- The Best of WWE - These are the matches, moments and Superstars that made WWE the worldwide leader in sports entertainment.
- WWE Ride Along – A show following WWE personalities as they drive from city to city.
- Table for 3 – Three WWE personalities share stories over dinner.
- Marquee Matches – Prominent matches in WWE history are showcased.
- Superstar Picks – WWE wrestlers present their favorite matches in their entirety.
- Beyond the Ring – Documentary portions of previously released WWE DVDs featuring various performers, organizations, and storylines.
- WWE Talking Smack - A post-show for SmackDown pay-per-views hosted by Renee Young and several guest hosts. The show was originally a weekly post-show for SmackDown Live and was hosted by Young and Shane McMahon or Daniel Bryan or John "Bradshaw" Layfield.
- WWE 365 – A documentary series that reviews a year in the career of a WWE talent.
- WWE Chronicle – A documentary series that chronicles a WWE personality and their journey through personal interviews and candid moments. Also airs on YouTube.
- Music Power 10 – A top 10 WWE Music countdown show.
- Watch Along – Pat McAfee interviews guests while watching various pay-per-views.
- WWE Photo Shoot – A show where current and former WWE personnel sit down to explain the stories behind photos of their careers and lives. Also airs on YouTube.
- The Day Of – A documentary series that catch a glimpse of WWE Superstars' lives as they prepare mentally and physically for their biggest matches. Also airs on YouTube.
- Steve Austin's Broken Skull Sessions – Stone Cold Steve Austin interviews WWE Superstars and legends.
- Break It Down – The stories behind some of the biggest matches and moments in WWE history are discussed by the Superstars and legends who lived them.
- Ruthless Aggression - The WWE Ruthless Aggression docuseries picks up where WWE Network's Monday Night War series left off, detailing the years that followed the Attitude Era, after WWE absorbed its-then top rival, WCW.
- Notsam Wrestling – Sam Roberts interviews WWE Superstars and legends.
- WWE Icons – A documentary series that is poised to be cover a number of top legends and Hall of Famers.
- WWE Evil – A documentary series that chronicles the minds of the most diabolical antagonists in WWE history and their impact on mainstream culture. (Peacock/American exclusive)
- First Look – A first look at upcoming WWE Home Video releases.
- Holy Foley! – A reality TV show starring Mick Foley and his family.
- Jerry Springer Too Hot for TV – Jerry Springer hosts this look back at some of WWE's most outrageous and embarrassing moments.
- Unfiltered with Renee Young – Interview show hosted by Renee Young. Topics discussed include WWE wrestlers' wrestling careers and stories, music, and films.
- Legends' House – A reality television series featuring several retired personnel.
- The Monday Night War: WWE vs. WCW – A television series about the Monday Night War.
- Slam City – An animated series featuring current WWE talent, based on the Mattel toy line of the same name.
- The WWE List – A fast-paced, interactive series that tallies tweets from the WWE Universe to compile the most unusual lists ever in WWE history.
- WrestleMania Rewind – The first show named to be part of the network; a retrospective look at WrestleMania's memorable moments.
- WWE Countdown – A top-10 countdown show based on interactive fan polls.
- WWE Rivalries – A show documenting rivalries in wrestling.
- Tough Talk – A post-show to Tough Enough hosted by Byron Saxton.
- Legends with JBL – An interview show hosted by John "Bradshaw" Layfield featuring WWE Legends and Hall of Famers.
- Culture Shock – Corey Graves reveals a variety of unique venues, customs, music, food, and people as WWE's tour travels around the world.
- Breaking Ground – A special look at the WWE Performance Center and what it takes to become a WWE wrestler.
- Stone Cold Podcast – Interview series hosted by Stone Cold Steve Austin.
- Live! with Chris Jericho – Interview series hosted by Chris Jericho.
- Swerved – A hidden camera prank show featuring WWE performers.
- Cruiserweight Classic – A thirty-two man tournament showcasing the cruiserweight division.
- Bring It to the Table – Peter Rosenberg hosts while Corey Graves and John "Bradshaw" Layfield debate controversial topics.
- Superstar Ink – Corey Graves asks WWE wrestlers about the meaning behind their tattoos. Also airs on YouTube.
- Straight to the Source – An interview show hosted by Corey Graves.
- Something Else to Wrestle with Bruce Prichard – Interview show hosted by Bruce Prichard and Conrad Thompson.
- Elias: Unplugged
- Then and Now
- My Son/Daughter is a WWE Superstar
- Game Night
- Where Are They Now
- NXT – A one-hour, in-ring program showcasing the NXT developmental brand, including periodic special live episodes. First-run editions of NXT moved to USA Network in an expanded live format in September 2019.
- The Edge and Christian Show – A comedy series and variety show starring Edge and Christian.
- Camp WWE – A short-form adult animation comedy series produced by Seth Green.
- Southpaw Regional Wrestling – A miniseries based on a fictional southern wrestling promotion set in the year 1987. Also airs on YouTube.
- Undertaker: The Last Ride - The unprecedented limited-series event chronicling over three years in the career of The Phenom.
- 205 Live – A 30-minute (formerly 45-60 minute), in-ring program showcasing WWE's cruiserweight brand of the same name.
- Worlds Collide – An in-ring series, which will feature interbrand competition between WWE's five brands: Raw, SmackDown, 205 Live, NXT, and NXT UK.
- Mixed Match Challenge – A seasonal tournament featuring mixed tag team matches. Episodes air with two days of delay (original broadcast continues to air on Facebook Watch).
- Mae Young Classic – A seasonal tournament featuring thirty-two women wrestlers.
- NXT UK – A one-hour, in-ring program showcasing the NXT UK developmental brand.
- WWE's The Bump - Hosts Megan Morant, Sam Roberts and Ryan Pappolla interview WWE Superstars and Legends, who share stories and answer questions from the WWE Universe.
- NXT Level Up – An in-ring program featuring talent from the NXT developmental brand.
- WWE SmackDown LowDown - A weekly Saturday morning post-show for WWE SmackDown, hosted by Megan Morant and Sam Roberts.
- WWE's The Ultimate Show - WWE hosts assemble fantasy dream matches featuring a who's who of WWE Legends and modern-day Superstars.
- This is Awesome - A retrospective series that celebrates the awesome moments in WWE. Hosted by Greg Miller. (Peacock/American exclusive)

=== Collections ===
WWE Network previously offered "WWE Collections", which were video packages of memorable characters and storylines. In July 2019, WWE updated the network and subsequently removed all collections.

=== Repeat/archival programming ===
In addition to previous editions of the original programs listed above, the network included many other previously aired events.

Although the United States parental guidelines rating system rates most weekly WWE television programs TV-PG, the WWE Network broadcast a wider range of content. A parental controls block was available and content rated TV-14 and TV-MA were preceded by an advisory warning. The Network aired footage featuring Chris Benoit; it marked the first major airing of Benoit footage or even mention of Benoit in said footage since his double-murder-suicide in 2007. However, the Benoit tribute episode of Raw was replaced with the episode that aired internationally, a recap of championship matches. Also, Vengeance: Night of Champions in 2007 removed all references to Benoit during the ECW World Championship match. Over the Edge 1999, infamous for Owen Hart's death at the event, was also available for the first time since its original air date; however, some portions of the event were edited out of respect to the Hart family. Matches called with Jesse Ventura on commentary, which had previously been dubbed over due to a 1991 lawsuit, were available with the original commentary.

While the Network promoted on-demand airings as being unedited, some instances of expletives, gestures, and all nudity were censored. Many programs were digitized for WWE 24/7 prior to the 2012 settlement with the World Wide Fund for Nature, and thus the "WWF" and the "WWF scratch" logo are censored in some instances. Some original music was dubbed over with alternate tracks such as the original intro music to Saturday Night's Main Event, (May 1985 – January 1988 episodes) which originally played "Obsession" by Animotion.

At launch, all but one of New Jack's matches were removed from ECW pay-per-views, as was his surprise return at Heat Wave 1998, due to a combination of musical rights issues over his entrance music and the inability to remove the music without losing the original commentary audio. The deleted matches were eventually reinstated with replacement music and newly recorded Joey Styles commentary. Several pay-per-views were copies of their condensed home video releases, rather than the live versions, and as such were missing matches.

Archive content on the Peacock-hosted version of WWE Network was further edited for content by NBCUniversal. On launch, two pay-per-views were edited to remove racially-insensitive content; WrestleMania VI was edited to remove a match between Roddy Piper and Bad News Brown where Piper had painted half of his body black, and Survivor Series 2005 was edited to remove a backstage segment where Vince McMahon used a racial slur in front of Booker T and John Cena.

==== Pay-per-views ====
Almost every WWF/WWE, JCP/WCW, and ECW pay-per-view (PPV) event ever produced was available for on-demand streaming. Although WWE promoted the selection as every pay-per-view ever made, a handful of PPV events were not made available. This included mostly foreign events such as WCW's Millennium Final, Collision in Korea, and the Japan Supershows, and ECW's foreign ECW/FMW Supershows, however, it also included some events held domestically, such as WCW's Nitro Girls Swimsuit Calendar Special and When Worlds Collide, and WWF's No Holds Barred: The Match/The Movie. (Note: The steel cage match from No Holds Barred: The Match/The Movie is available on the home video Supertape, which is available on the WWE Network.)

In addition, the pay-per-view section contained several events which did not air on pay-per-view, such as WWE events Royal Rumble 1988 and WWE Global Warning Tour: Melbourne. Many ECW Supercards were also listed as pay-per-views, despite never actually airing there.

==== WWF/WWE home video ====
The WWE Network offered videos under the "Home Video Classics" header which included various previous home video releases that had been originally released by Coliseum Video.

- Andre The Giant
- Bashed in the USA
- Battle Royal at the Albert Hall
- Big, Small, Strange, Strong
- Big Daddy Cool Diesel
- Bloopers, Bleeps, and Bodyslams
- Brains Behind the Brawn
- Bret Hart: Greatest Matches
- Bret "The Hitman" Hart
- British Bulldog Davey Boy Smith
- The British Bulldogs
- Bruno Sammartino: Living Legend
- Brutus The Barber Beefcake
- Crunch Classic
- Demolition
- Euro Rampage '92
- Funniest Moments
- George 'The Animal' Steele
- German Fan Favorites
- Global Warfare
- Global Warning Tour: Melbourne
- Grand Slams
- Greatest Hits
- Grudge Match '86
- 'Hacksaw' Jim Duggan
- The Hart Foundation
- Hottest Matches
- Hulk Hogan: Real American
- The Hulkster Hulk Hogan
- Inside the Steel Cage
- Invasion '92
- Invasion of the Bodyslammers
- Jake The Snake Roberts
- The Ken Patera Story
- Life and Times: Capt. Lou Albano
- Macho Madness
- Macho Man and Elizabeth
- Mega Matches
- Most Embarrassing Moments
- Paul Bearer Hits From the Crypt
- Rampage '91
- Rampage '92
- Razor Ramon
- Ricky "The Dragon" Steamboat
- Roddy Pipers Greatest Hits
- Smack'Em Whack'Em
- Shawn Michaels
- Sunny
- SuperTape '92
- SuperTape II
- SuperTape III
- SuperTape IV
- SuperTape
- UK Fan Favorites 1993
- UK Rampage '93
- The Ultimate Warrior 1989
- The Ultimate Warrior 1992
- The Undertaker Buries Them Alive
- The Undertaker The Face of Fear
- Unusual Matches
- Villains of the Squared Circle
- World Tour '90
- World Tour '91
- World Tour '92
- WrestleFest '90
- WrestleFest '91
- WrestleFest '92
- WrestleFest '93
- Wrestling Superheroes
- Wrestling Tough Guys
- Wrestling's Greatest Champions

==== WWWF/WWF/WWE programming ====
- Every episode of Raw (except the episodes aired in the last 31 days)
- Every episode of SmackDown (except the episodes aired in the last 31 days)
- Every episode of NXT (except the episodes aired in the last 24 hours)
- Every episode of NXT UK
- Every episode of Main Event (except the episodes aired in the last 16 days)
- Every episode of Tribute to the Troops
- Every WWE Hall of Fame induction ceremony (Clips from 1994 to 1996, full event 2004–2025)
- Every episode of Mixed Match Challenge
- Every episode of Saturday Night's Main Event and The Main Event
- Every episode of Tuesday Night Titans with the exception of episode 31
- Every episode of ECW
- Every episode of Legends of Wrestling
- Select episodes of Championship Wrestling from 1980
- Select episodes of WWE Superstars from 2014 to 2016
- Select episodes of WWF Superstars from 1992 to 1996
- Select episodes of Wrestling Challenge from 1986 to 1987
- Select episodes of Prime Time Wrestling from 1986, 1990–1992; all from 1987 to 1989
- Select episodes of Old School, archival house shows typically from Madison Square Garden and Boston Garden from 1973, 1975–1988, 1990–1991 and 1997.
- Select episodes of All-Star Wrestling from 1975 to 1982
- Select episodes of Heat from 1998 to 1999 (all 1998; January–July 1999)
- Select episodes of Confidential all from 2002, select from 2003 to 2004
- Select episodes of Velocity from 2002 to 2004.

==== JCP/WCW programming ====
- Every episode of Clash of the Champions
- Every episode of Monday Nitro
- Every episode of Thunder
- Select episodes of Mid-Atlantic Championship Wrestling from 1981 to 1986 (204 episodes)
- Select episodes of Saturday Night all from 1986 to 1988, select from 1985, 1989, 1992–1994

==== ECW programming ====
- Every episode of Hardcore TV
- Every episode of ECW Wrestling

==== Other promotions ====
- Select episodes of AWA Championship Wrestling from 1983, 1986–1988
- Select episodes of Global Wrestling Federation from 1990 to 1992
- Select episodes of Mid-South Wrestling/Power Pro Wrestling all from 1983, select from 1981 to 1982, 1984–1986
- Select episodes of Smoky Mountain Wrestling from 1994
- Select episodes of World Class Championship Wrestling from 1982 to 1988 (339 of 397) total

==== Non-wrestling content ====
- Every episode of Tough Enough
- Every episode of seasons 1–9 of Total Divas
- Every episode of seasons 1–6 of Total Bellas
- Every episode of seasons 1–3 of Miz & Mrs.
- Select content from the E! library

Additional content from WWE Libraries, which has a library of over 100,000 hours of programming, was to be added over time.

=== Independent wrestling content ===
- Evolve (promotion acquired by WWE in 2020, select events available)
- Progress Wrestling (2020–2023, select events were available)
- Insane Championship Wrestling (2020–2023)
  - Fight Club (select episodes from 2018 and first-run episodes from November 2020 until 2023)
  - Select marquee events such as Shug's Hoose Party 5 and Fear and Loathing XI, with post-pandemic marquee events going first-run from Fear and Loathing XII until Insane Championship Wrestling's 2023 events
- Westside Xtreme Wrestling (2020–2025)
  - Shotgun 2020 (Season 2 episodes)
  - We Love Wrestling (episodes delayed from original wXwNOW releases)
  - Select marquee events (events delayed from original wXwNOW releases)

=== Removed content ===
- Hulk Hogan's Rock 'n' Wrestling (Removed after controversial racial statements previously made by Hogan were made public.)
- Stampede Wrestling (Removed after rights dispute with Bret Hart.)
- As Seen on YouTube – The best of WWE's YouTube content.
- WWE Quick Hits – A monthly show with extra short clips from various DVDs & WWE Network shows.

== Impact on pay-per-view industry ==
In an interview with Time, Michelle D. Wilson, chief revenue and marketing officer for WWE, stated their reason for bypassing cable companies and instead only offering the WWE Network online: "Digital over-the-top offerings represent the future, and given that our passionate fans consume five times more online video content than non-WWE viewers and over-index for purchasing online subscriptions such as Netflix and Hulu, we believe the time is now for a WWE Network."

In response to the announcement, DirecTV issued a statement saying that they are re-evaluating whether to continue carrying WWE's pay-per-view events. Due to the fact that these events would also be available on the WWE Network once it launches, it might reduce the number of pay-per-view purchases via cable and satellite providers. Vince McMahon suggested that pay-TV operators would ultimately decide to continue to carry WWE's pay-per-view events, given that providers keep a significant share of each purchase, and incur minimal costs (apart from WWE's share of the fee for each purchase) to carry the events: "It's found money for them." DirecTV later quietly dropped carriage of WWE PPVs. In response, WWE said, "Yes, DIRECTV has decided to stop offering our PPV's residentially and commercially. The only other option would be to work through the local cable provider."

On February 19, 2014, Dish Network announced that they would carry WWE pay-per-views on an event by event basis, beginning with Elimination Chamber. Dish Network later released a statement saying, "Dish will not offer the 'WWE Elimination Chamber' PPV on 2/23. WWE is not willing to adjust their PPV costs to satellite and cable companies, which is unfair to their customers. We need to re-focus our efforts to support partners that better serve Dish customers." Dish later made a decision to air WrestleMania XXX. Dish declined to offer WrestleMania 31 and 32 but did offer WrestleMania 33 in 2017.

== Advertising ==
In October 2014, it was reported Mattel, Kmart, and Pepsi would begin advertising on the network starting the week of October 13. Wilson stated that although no commercial breaks will occur during scheduled programming, 30 second adverts would run in between shows, and that one 15 or 30-second advert would be shown prior to every fourth stream of on-demand content.
