= Appare-Ranman! =

Japanese anime television series

- Key visual

天晴爛漫!
- Manga
- Written by: Masakazu Hashimoto
- Illustrated by: Ahndongshik
- Published by: Kadokawa Shoten
- English publisher: NA: Yen Press
- Magazine: Young Ace
- Original run: April 3, 2020 – January 4, 2022
- Volumes: 3
- Anime television series
- Directed by: Masakazu Hashimoto
- Written by: Masakazu Hashimoto
- Music by: Evan Call
- Studio: P.A. Works
- Licensed by: Crunchyroll (Note: In North America through Crunchyroll, LLC (formerly known as Funimation).)
- Original network: AT-X, Tokyo MX, BS11, KBS, KNB, SUN TV, TVA
- Original run: April 10, 2020 – September 25, 2020
- Episodes: 13
- icon

Appare-Ranman! (天晴爛漫!; lit. 'Appare in Full Bloom!') is an original Japanese anime television series produced by P.A. Works, and directed by Masakazu Hashimoto. The series aired from April to September 2020. A manga adaptation by Ahndongshik was serialized in Kadokawa Shoten's Young Ace magazine from April 2020 to January 2022.

== Plot ==
Set around the start of the Meiji era in Japan, an eccentric inventor and second son of a respected merchant family, Appare Sorano, decides one day to set off on an adventure. However, the samurai Kosame Isshiki is tasked with keeping Appare's eccentric behavior in check. While trying to drag Appare back to Japan, Kosame accidentally strands them both at sea, until they are saved at the last moment by a passing American steamship. Now stuck in Los Angeles with no money and no easy way to return to Japan, Appare and Kosame decide to enter the "Trans-America Wild Race," where Appare gets the chance to build a custom automobile and Kosame gets the opportunity to earn enough money to return home. The two of them will have to work together while fighting off other rival racers, bandits, and other challenges as they try to win the race.

== Characters ==
Appare Sorano (空乃 天晴, Sorano Appare)
Voiced by: Natsuki Hanae (Japanese); Lee George (English)
The second son of the Sorano merchant family. Much to his family's dismay, Appare does not care much for social norms or inheriting the family business, instead spending his time inventing new gadgets and studying various scientific texts. He was inspired from a very young age when he got a copy of the Jules Verne novel From the Earth to the Moon. He decides to enter Trans-America Wild Race in his own steam-powered vehicle.
Kosame Isshiki (一色 小雨, Isshiki Kosame)
Voiced by: Seiichiro Yamashita, Mutsumi Tamura^{Ep. 7 credits} (young) (Japanese); Ivan Jasso, Jalitza Delgado (young) (English)
The head instructor of his family's dojo and a samurai under Lord Kuroda. Kosame was tasked by his Lord with keeping Appare under control, but was dragged with him to America after a series of accidents. Despite being a strong samurai, he has PTSD from an incident in his past and has trouble attacking another person.
Hototo (ホトト)
Voiced by: Aoi Yūki (Japanese); Emi Lo (English)
A Native American boy from a northeastern tribe whose father was killed and family displaced by a man with a snake tattoo on his neck. After being rescued from thugs in Los Angeles, he joins Appare and Kosame while hoping to hunt down his father's killer.
Jing Xialian (ジン・シャーレン, Jin Shāren)
Voiced by: Sora Amamiya (Japanese); Suzie Yeung (English)
A Chinese-American general assistant for an auto-racing team who dreams of becoming a racer, only to be denied due to prejudice against women. She secretly drives the team's cars at night and befriends Appare and Kosame. After an altercation with the team driver, she earns the owner's grudging respect and he provides her with an old car to enter the Trans-America Wild Race herself.
Al Lyon (アル・リオン, Aru Rion)
Voiced by: Soma Saito (Japanese); Brandon McInnis (English)
A wealthy European (French in the English dub) from the family that owns one of the three B.I.G. Boss auto companies, Bright New Works (BNW). He seeks to win the Trans-America Wild Race to prove to his family that he should be the heir to the company.
Sofia Taylor (ソフィア・テイラー, Sofia Teirā)
Voiced by: Fumiko Orikasa (Japanese); Xanthe Huynh (English)
Al's self-proclaimed "chaperone" and assistant whose mother serves as a domestic maid to Al's family.
Seth Rich Carter (セス・リッチー・カッター, Sesu Ritchī Kattā)
Voiced by: Kazuyuki Okitsu (Japanese); Blake McNamara (English)
An engineer for Great Motors (GM) and an organizer of the Trans-America Wild Race, with ambitions of running the company.
Dylan G. Oldin (ディラン・G・オルディン, Diran G Orudin)
Voiced by: Takahiro Sakurai (Japanese); Robert McCollum (English)
A top racer driving for GM in the Trans-America Wild Race and a skilled gunman. One of the legendary "Thousand Three" outlaws known as "Dylan the Hero."
TJ (ティー・ジェイ, Tī Jei)
Voiced by: Tomokazu Sugita (Japanese); Ace Anderson (English)
Known as Crazy TJ, he is another of the legendary Thousand Three outlaws who is hired by the Iron Motor Company to drive the Trans-America Wild Race.
Tristan the Bad (トリスタン・ザ・バッド, Torisutan za Baddo)
Voiced by: Daisuke Ono (Japanese); Tyson Rinehart (English)
Driver for Tlaloc. While he begins the race under the identity of Gil T. Cigar, he later reveals he is actually Tristan of the Bad Brothers and that he impersonated Gil at the organizer's request.
Chase the Bad (チェイス・ザ・バッド, Cheisu za Baddo)
Voiced by: Tetsu Inada (Japanese); Cris George (English)
Partner and brother of Tristan.
Richard Riesman (リチャード・リースマン, Richādo Rīsuman) / Gil T. Cigar (ギル・T・シガー, Giru T Shigā)
Voiced by: Kenjiro Tsuda (Japanese); Brandon Potter (English)
A competitor who drives his car, the GT3. He is later revealed to be Gil the Butcher, the leader of the legendary Thousand Three outlaws. He is hired by a railroad magnate to sabotage the race but decides to use the opportunity to make a profit by holding the train and passengers for a ransom.

== Production and release ==
On October 12, 2019, P.A. Works announced that they were producing the 13-episode original anime television series directed and written by Masakazu Hashimoto. Yurie Oohigashi designed the characters based on the original designs by Ahndongshik, with Shiho Takeuchi handling mechanical designs, and Evan Call composing the series' music. Mia Regina performed the series' opening theme song "I got it!" while the ending song was performed by Showtaro Morikubo. It aired from April 10 to September 25, 2020, on AT-X and other networks. On April 17, 2020, it was announced that airings of episode 4 and onward were delayed due to the effects of the COVID-19 pandemic. On June 9, 2020, it was announced that the anime would restart on July 3, 2020, and the fourth episode premiered on July 24, 2020.

=== Episodes ===
No.	Title (Note: All English titles are taken from Funimation.)	Original release date
1	"Sunny (Appare), with Occasional Showers (Kosame)"; Transliteration: "Hare, tokidoki Kosame" (Japanese: 晴れ、ときどき小雨)	April 10, 2020
A colorful cast of racers sets off on the Trans-America Wild Race, a competition to be the first to drive their car from Los Angeles to New York to win a large cash prize. In a flashback to one year earlier, a samurai named Kosame Isshiki was tasked by Lord Kuroda to oversee Appare Sorano, an eccentric inventor whose latest contraption damaged the Lord's garden. In anger, Kuroda threw Appare in a jail cell with violent criminals, but Appare broke out and quietly headed back to his room on his family's land. Kosame begged Appare to ask the Lord for forgiveness, but Appare ignored him, heading down a secret passageway to a custom mini steamship he built. Appare said goodbye to his sister and headed out on his ship, with Kosame trying to drag him back, but Kosame accidentally hit the emergency throttle, stranding them both at sea with no food or freshwater. Miraculously, a large steamship passed by and rescued them, carrying them all the way to port in Los Angeles in America.
2	"In the Dark"	April 17, 2020
Appare and Kosame set up in a storehouse near the Los Angeles port when the steamship captain informs them they will be stuck there unless they earn enough money to pay for a trip back home. The pair have no luck finding jobs until Kosame uses his sword training to earn some money. Later that day, the two come across a racetrack where the B.I.G. Boss auto conglomerate announces a prize of $1.51 million to anyone who can beat their racecar and win in the Trans-America Wild Race to New York. Appare decides to enter and sneaks onto the racetrack that night with Kosame to study the cars up close. Kosame wanders onto the racetrack and nearly gets hit. The driver in question is Jing Xialian, a "chore girl" who is prejudiced for being a woman, and she fears being fired for driving a car without permission. Appare responds that she should not let other people dissuade her as he secretly fixes the car. The next night, Kosame tries to confront some thugs who are beating up a child, but has a sudden bout of PTSD. He is saved at the last moment by another gunman.
3	"DUEL"	April 24, 2020
The thugs flee when they discover the gunman is Dylan of the "Thousand Three". The next day, the boy tells Appare and Kosame his name is Hototo, and that he came to find the man who killed his father. Later, a European driver, Al Lyon, lands at the port with Sofia Taylor, hoping to win the Wild Race and prove to his family that he is a worthy heir to the BNW company. While drinking tea, Al informs Appare and Kosame that he has bought the storehouse. Appare soon challenges Al to a race. After visiting Jing for spare parts, Appare returns and mounts his wind-up two-wheeler invention. (Note: A personal transporter, which resembles a Segway.) Appare and Al then raise the stakes. On the day of the race, Appare chooses a wasteland track on the outskirts of the city and arrives in a large contraption with Kosame. Despite Al having the faster car, Appare ejects a piece of his vehicle and slingshots Kosame to the finish line. As such, Al lets Appare keep the storehouse, while Appare gives his two-wheeler to Sofia. The two pledge to have even better cars for the Trans-America Wild Race.
4	"Let It Go"	July 24, 2020
Kosame has the idea of selling Al's car to pay for a return trip to Japan, but Appare has completely disassembled it. Meanwhile, Jing is frustrated by the patronizing attitude of her boss and his driver David against women. Following an altercation, the owner gives her a chance to race David using an old spare racer. She manages to get the broken-down car to Appare, who convinces Al to repair it. On the day of the race, David leads for nine laps in his faster car after Jing loses her early lead. On the last lap, her strategy of tailing David pays off and she gains the lead. However, as they approach the finish line, he shoves her car off the track and wins. The owner punches David for endangering his car, but he is impressed by Jing's skill and offers her the car for the Trans-America Wild Race. In a change of heart, some of the mechanics offer to modify the car for her. Later, Dylan Oldin, the driver at the GM company, learns that Iron Motor Company has hired Crazy TJ as a driver and that Gil the Butcher is also entering the race.
5	"The Eve, and..."	July 31, 2020
On the eve of the Trans-America Wild Race, Kosame quits his part-time job at Bob's Café and the team attends a pre-start party. There, they meet Seth Rich Carter and the other competitors, Crazy TJ, Gil T. Cigar, and his partner, Chase. The rules are explained to the competitors, which encourage the use of gasoline as the fuel, and forced rest stops, which benefit the larger manufacturers. Outside, when Hototo confronts Dylan about the man wearing a snake tattoo who killed his father, the latter reveals that it was probably one of Gil's men. TJ interrupts the draw for pole positions, and the event descends into chaos as a fight ensues. The next day, the race begins and Appare takes off with Kosame and Hototo in the only steam-powered vehicle in last place.
6	"I Am Gil!"	August 7, 2020
The racers head towards the finish line of the first stage in the town of Lancaster, and Dylan wins followed closely by TJ. Appare's vehicle arrives in the last place, although he made up time in his slower machine by driving cross-country. During the rest stop, Hototo sees a snake tattoo on one of Gil's men. He later overhears Gil's men plotting to slow everyone down with a roadblock at the entrance of the Valley of Despair before they burst through it. They then plan to set off an explosion as the other competitors pass-through behind them on the way to Death Valley. Unfortunately, Hototo is captured and locked in a box. Kosame realizes Hototo is missing and while searching for him, Richard Riesman tells Kosame the location of Gil's camp. Kosame finds it but not Hototo. At midnight, all the racers except for Appare leave for the next stage, but they are soon stopped by Gil's barricade. Meanwhile, Hototo has managed to escape and he joins Appare and Kosame. Appare drives his vehicle off after the other cars while Hototo explains to them Gil's plan.
7	"FAKE"	August 14, 2020
Appare has installed a gasoline engine from Al's car in his vehicle alongside the steam engine to increase its power output. Meanwhile, Gil bursts through his blockade in his armored vehicle and into the Valley of Despair. His men set off an explosion behind them to create another blockage for the other competitors. Appare's engines are damaged by falling rocks. Al and Jing turn back and offer to take turns towing them to the next supply point, which Appare reluctantly agrees. They camp for the night and everyone appears to have useful survival skills except Appare. The next morning in Eli, Nevada, Gil, Reisman, and Buffalo Billy are preparing to drive off when Al, Jing, and Appare arrive. They accuse Gil of causing the roadblock, but their action is not specifically prohibited by the rules. Hototo blocks the road demanding revenge for his father's death. Surprisingly, Gil removes his mask and reveals that he is Chase's brother Tristan and they are the real "Bad Brothers" and not killers. As "Gil" is about to head off, he discovers that Appare had sabotaged his vehicle, requiring Gil's team to spend the next eight hours reassembling it.
8	"HEAVY RAIN"	August 21, 2020
Appare, Al, and Jing set off for the next stage but come upon a group of other competitors who have been attacked by men on horseback. The only survivor is Richard Riesman. Surprisingly, Appare decides to go after them and Al and Jing agree. Hototo tracks the killers to an unfriendly small town. After a short investigation, they find themselves surrounded by Gil's men. The group tries to fight their way out but are beaten and captured, except for Kosame who could not draw his sword and is left lying in the street. He is taken in by the sympathetic saloon keeper and after he tells her about the killing of his mother, he realizes that he must save his friends. At sundown, Kosame finds his friends about to be hung in the main street and challenges the killers. When they prepare to shoot him, Kosame finally draws his sword and skillfully defeats them. That evening, they arrive at the next supply point, Denver, behind the leaders, Dylan, TJ, and Riesman. Meanwhile, the real Gil T. Cigar—who is revealed to be Riesman—assures his backers that he has the situation under control.
9	"Short Break"	August 28, 2020
The race is plotted on a different route following the deaths of some competitors by unknown attackers. However, Riesman decides to pull out. While the arrangements are made to uses a different supply point, the drivers are granted a one day layover. Appare tries to solve the problem of heat exchange between his two engines and on Al's suggestion, he approaches Seth Rich Carter, who was a former engineer. Carter refuses, although he is intrigued by Appare's engine configuration. After exchanging words, Al challenges TJ, who proposes a drinking contest. After one glass of tequila, Al passes out. Sofia takes Al's place and surprisingly out-drinks TJ and takes the rest of the bottle with her as she leaves the saloon with Al. Kosame and Jing spend some time sparring before they go to bathe in hot springs with Hototo. While they find the other competitors there, they all take the time to relax and indulge in a little horseplay. The next day, Appare's vehicle is ready to join the other competitors when they leave for the next destination, North Platte, Nebraska.
10	"The Bridge to Hell"	September 4, 2020
The cars take off and so does the train in a race to be the first to cross Missouri's railroad bridge. On the train, it is revealed that Gil was hired to sabotage the race by a railroad magnate. He is then killed after he chastises Gil. Gil soon announces to the passengers his true identity and blows up the rear carriages of the train. His bandits take control as it reaches the bridge before he runs towards the racers stopped nearby, shouting for help. Dylan and TJ realize something is wrong and identify him as Gil the Butcher. TJ challenges Gil, but he is too fast and he knocks out TJ. Dylan stops Gil from shooting TJ, and when one of Gil's men intervene, Gil kills him. Gil reminds Dylan and the racers that he has taken the train passengers hostage, including Sofia, and demands the entire prize money. After ridiculing Dylan and Hototo for letting their loved ones die, he and his group disable everyone's vehicles. When Appare shouts for him to stop, Gil shoots at him, but Kosame takes the bullet instead. Gil leaves with the train and Sofia as Kosame passes out.
11	"Rain in the Dark Night"	September 11, 2020
Tristan and Chase arrive late at the scene in their beaten up vehicle to find Kosame. They take him to the hospital while the damaged cars are towed back into town. Kosume's bullet is removed, but he remains unconscious in a hospital in a critical condition. Appare becomes despondent and refuses to continue the race, but Al decides to get his car roadworthy and rescue Sofia from Gil. Kosame eventually regains consciousness and he inspires Appare not to give up hope, and Appare convinces the other drivers to rescue Sofia and continue the race. Surprisingly, Carter risks his job by allocating his mechanics to assist in repairing everyone's cars.
12	"We Will Stop You!!"	September 18, 2020
Gil amuses himself by mistreating his hostages in the church of an abandoned town. The Great Race competitors complete repairs to their vehicles after Carter offers the services of his mechanics. Kosame recovers from his injuries and he joins Appare and the other competitors to head for Gil's likely hideout, a ghost town 90km away. When they arrive, Dylan and TJ make a frontal attack on Gil's Snakes while the others try to locate and rescue the hostages. Meanwhile, one of Gil's lieutenants brings him Carter, but he is followed by the wounded Chase. Gil angrily shoots his own man for failing to fulfill his orders to slaughter the rescuers. Gradually, the competitors overcome Gil's other lieutenants and eventually track him down to the local church.
13	"Over the Moon"	September 25, 2020
The group of rescuers enter the church and prepare to attack Gil. He fires at them but Kosame deflects the bullets. While Gil reloads, they all attack. In close combat, however, Gil is too fast and skilled. Gil reveals that Sofia is on the train bound for Chicago, where he intends for it to crash into the terminal station. The rescuers attack again, but this time Gil is hit in the back by a flare lit by Appare, momentarily distracting him before Dylan and TJ arrive. Appere and the other drivers catch the train as just it reaches the outskirts of Chicago. They cannot release Sofia, so Appere uses his vehicle to bring it to a stop. Back in the ghost town, Dylan and TJ finally manage to defeat Gil. One month later, the racers approach the finish in New York. Dylan, TJ, Al, and Jing are in the lead, but Appare, Kosame, and Hototo manage a final boost and cross the finish line first. Everyone prepares to leave for home, but Appare decides to stay in the United States. While Kosame initially books a passage back to Japan, he decides to stay with Appare.

=== Manga adaptation ===
A manga adaptation by Ahndongshik was serialized in Kadokawa Shoten's Young Ace magazine from April 3, 2020, to January 4, 2022. It has been collected in three tankōbon volumes. At Anime NYC 2022, Yen Press announced that they licensed the manga for English publication.

==== Volumes ====
No.	Original release date	Original ISBN	English release date	English ISBN
1	September 4, 2020	978-4-04-109820-2	June 20, 2023	978-1-97-536058-0 (print); 978-1-97-536059-7 (digital)
Episodes 1–5
2	December 28, 2021	978-4-04-109821-9	June 20, 2023	978-1-97-536058-0 (print); 978-1-97-536059-7 (digital)
Episodes 6–13
3	December 28, 2021	978-4-04-112019-4	June 20, 2023	978-1-97-536058-0 (print); 978-1-97-536059-7 (digital)
Episodes 14–20
