= WWE Libraries =

Subsidiary of American professional wrestling company, WWE

WWE Libraries Inc.
- Type: Subsidiary
- Industry: Professional wrestling Sports entertainment Tape library archiving
- Founded: 2001
- Headquarters: Stamford, Connecticut, U.S.
- Area served: Worldwide
- Products: Home video releases (DVD, Blu-ray, VHS); Online streaming services Television channel subscriptions
- Owner: TKO Group Holdings (WME Group)
- Parent: WWE
- Subsidiaries: American Wrestling Association; Evolve; Extreme Championship Wrestling; Georgia Championship Wrestling; World Championship Wrestling; Others

WWE Libraries Inc., branded as the WWE Legacy Department, is an American media company that consists of the largest collection of professional wrestling videos and copyrights in the world. The Legacy Department is a subsidiary of WWE, the professional wrestling subsidiary of TKO Group Holdings. It comprises not only past and current works by WWE (formerly the Capitol Wrestling Corporation, World Wide Wrestling Federation, World Wrestling Federation, and World Wrestling Entertainment) but also the works of now defunct professional wrestling promotions dating back to the 1930s. As of 2014, the library stands at 150,000 hours of content including weekly television shows, pay-per-views, and recorded house shows. The collection represents a very significant portion of the visual history of modern professional wrestling in the United States and Canada. WWE has made their classic holdings available through numerous home video releases, the Vintage television program, and on the WWE Network and WWE Classics on Demand services.

== Classic WWE holdings ==
The Legacy Department's library includes all past and present WWE tapes dating back to the 1950s, including the footage from previous forms of the company. The footage saved from WWE's time as the Capitol Wrestling Corporation is among the rare surviving footage of broadcasts from the DuMont Television Network, as most of their footage was destroyed in the mid-1970s.

Although not wrestling content, the library's holdings include footage from various documentaries, reality shows, and fictional works produced for home video, the WWE Network and other broadcasters, and any motion pictures produced by WWE Studios. The library also maintains footage from WWE's non-wrestling sister companies, the World Bodybuilding Federation and XFL.

== Non-WWE purchases ==
For years, WWE has engaged in a campaign of purchasing libraries of defunct wrestling promotions. The first significant purchase took place in 2001 when the company bought the complete historical archives of their former competitor World Championship Wrestling. The purchase of Extreme Championship Wrestling's intellectual proprieties and video library during its bankruptcy proceedings in 2003 gave WWE control over the majority of all national professional wrestling footage available at the time.

On August 13, 2020, WWE announced that shows from the libraries of active independent wrestling promotions Evolve, Westside Xtreme Wrestling, Progress Wrestling, and Insane Championship Wrestling would begin airing on the WWE Network. As part of the agreement, all the respective promotions would continue to own their footage and remain separate entities from WWE. However, later in 2020, WWE purchased Evolve and Dragon Gate USA, its defunct sister promotion, after which Evolve ceased operations until it was revived as a WWE developmental brand in 2025.

The dates listed below for purchased organizations and libraries represent the duration of footage that WWE owns and may not necessarily represent the entire extent of the promotion's existence.

- American Wrestling Association (Note: The American Wrestling Association was formerly known as the Minneapolis Boxing & Wrestling Club.) (1933–1991, shared with ESPN)
- Georgia Championship Wrestling (1944–1984) (Note: WWE owns Georgia Championship Wrestling's video footage from 1944–1984. All post-1984 footage is owned by its respective owners.)
- Extreme Championship Wrestling (Note: Extreme Championship Wrestling was formerly known as Eastern Championship Wrestling.) (1992–2001)
- Lucha Libre AAA Worldwide (Note: Lucha Libre AAA Worldwide was formerly known as Asistencia, Asesoría y Administración de Espectáculos and AAA.) (1992–present, shared with Televisa)
- Memphis Championship Wrestling (2000–2001)
- Ohio Valley Wrestling (1999–2008) (Note: WWE owns Ohio Valley Wrestling's video footage from 1999–2008, the time when it served as WWE's developmental territory. All footage prior to 1999 and after 2008 remains under the ownership of Ohio Valley Wrestling itself.)
- Deep South Wrestling (2005–2007) (Note: WWE owns Deep South Wrestling's video footage from 2005–2007, the time when it served as WWE's developmental territory. All footage prior to 2005 and after 2007 remain under the ownership of their respective owners.)
- Florida Championship Wrestling (2007–2012)
- Heartland Wrestling Association (2001–2002) (Note: WWE owns the Heartland Wrestling Association's video footage from 2001–2002, the time when it served as WWE's developmental territory. All footage prior to 2001 and after 2002 remain under the ownership of their respective owners.)
- Smoky Mountain Wrestling (1992–1995)
- Stampede Wrestling (Note: Stampede Wrestling was formerly known as Klondike Wrestling, Big Time Wrestling, and Wildcat Wrestling.) (1948–2008) (Note: While WWE owns Stampede Wrestling's video library, Bret Hart owns the rights to the footage of his matches in Stampede.)
- Global Wrestling Federation (Note: Select footage from the United States Wrestling Association was included in WWE's purchase of the Global Wrestling Federation's video library. WWE, however, does not own the entire United States Wrestling Association video library, which is owned by its respective owners.) (1991–1994, shared with ESPN)
- World Championship Wrestling (1988–2001)
  - Jim Crockett Promotions (Note: Jim Crockett Promotions was formerly known as Eastern States Championship Wrestling and Mid-Atlantic Championship Wrestling. Footage of the Jim Crockett Promotions-produced Ric Flair's Last Match in July 2022 is owned by Conrad Thompson.) (1931–1988), which by the end of its existence included:
    - Central States Wrestling (1948–1986) (Note: WWE owns all footage of Central States Wrestling and its predecessor Midwest Wrestling Association from 1948 until 1986. All post 1986 footage of Central States Wrestling and its successor promotion World Wrestling Alliance are owned by their respective owners.)
    - Championship Wrestling from Florida (1949–1987) (Note: While Championship Wrestling from Florida was bought by Jim Crockett Promotions, the video library was not part of the purchase. WWE later bought the video library from the private owner.)
    - Championship Wrestling from Georgia (1984–1985)
    - St. Louis Wrestling Club (1959–1985)
    - Universal Wrestling Federation (Note: The Universal Wrestling Federation was previously known as NWA Tri-State and Mid-South Wrestling.) (1950s–1987) (Note: While the Universal Wrestling Federation was bought by Jim Crockett Promotions, the video library was not part of the purchase. WWE later bought the video library from the private owner.)
- World Class Championship Wrestling (1966–1988) (Note: WWE owns the footage of World Class Championship Wrestling, including the footage of its predecessor NWA Big Time Wrestling and its successor World Class Wrestling Association, until 1988. Angelo and Mario Savoldi, the former owners of International World Class Championship Wrestling, own all post-1988 footage of World Class Championship Wrestling and its successor promotions.)
- Maple Leaf Wrestling (Note: Maple Leaf Wrestling was formerly known as the Queensbury Athletic Club.) (1930–1984) (Note: WWE owns the footage of Maple Leaf Wrestling until 1984. All post-1984 footage of Maple Leaf Wrestling and its successor Maple Leaf Pro Wrestling is owned by its respective owners.)
- Ultimate Pro Wrestling (1999–2007)
- World Wrestling Council (Note: The World Wrestling Council was previously known as Capitol Sports Promotions.) (1973–2018) (Note: WWE owns the video footage of the World Wrestling Council and its predecessor from 1973–2018. All post-2018 footage remains under the ownership of the World Wrestling Council itself.)
- Evolve (2010–2020)
- Dragon Gate USA (Note: Select footage from Full Impact Pro was included in WWE's purchase of the Dragon Gate USA and Evolve video library. WWE, however, does not own the entire Full Impact Pro video library, which is owned by its respective owners.) (2009–2015) (Note: WWE owns the footage of Dragon Gate USA until 2015. Footage of the Dragon Gate USA-produced The Rebirth and The Gate of Revolution from April 2025 and subsequent Dragon Gate USA events remain under the ownership of Dragongate Japan Pro-Wrestling.)
- International Championship Wrestling (1978–1984)

== Relationship with the National Wrestling Alliance ==
Throughout its history, WWE has had a long relationship with the National Wrestling Alliance (NWA). For many decades, from its founding in 1948 until the mid-1980s, the NWA acted as a governing body of America's many regional wrestling promotions, and membership in the NWA allowed for the shared use of big-name stars for local wrestling events. WWE (as the CWC) was a member of the NWA between the 1950s and 1963, and again (as the WWWF/WWF) between 1971 and 1983. In 1998, WWE (as the WWF) hosted NWA matches on its programming.

Jim Crockett Promotions (JCP) was an NWA member for its entire post-1948 existence and by the end of the promotion's run was widely regarded as the NWA itself, due to its purchases and control of the largest regional NWA promotions. This was exemplified by the presence of all major NWA titles in World Championship Wrestling (WCW) when JCP morphed into WCW in 1988. WCW's relationship with the NWA continued until 1993, when the promotion pulled out of the NWA.

As a result of WWE's former membership in the NWA, through its ownership of WCW and its predecessor, and through its ownership of Extreme Championship Wrestling (which was an NWA member until it suddenly severed ties in 1994) and other smaller regional promotions, WWE owns a vast amount of NWA footage, making up the majority of significant NWA matches from the 1970s, 1980s, and early 1990s. While WWE owns the majority of the video libraries of the NWA's previous notable members, WWE does not own the NWA itself, which is currently owned by Billy Corgan's Lightning One, Inc. company. As such, the WWE Legacy Department is not allowed to use the NWA name or logo to promote their video libraries.

== Condition of the video libraries ==
Although professional wrestling has been on television throughout the medium's existence, not all broadcasts were recorded, nor necessarily saved, and most promotions did not have a regular television presence until the 1970s. Most broadcasts were taped over, so very little footage exists from pre-1970s promotions. The historical availability of individual, non-televised matches is also incomplete, as likely only the most significant bouts were recorded for posterity, and can be lost to time.

Several factors have adversely affected the quality of some surviving tapes. Upon taking control of the World Championship Wrestling library, it was noted that the tapes were unlabeled and not categorized. The condition of some WCW tapes is such that WWE could not air them on WWE Classics on Demand, or on the WWE Network.

=== Editing ===
WWE owns the unedited master tapes for all content in the library. However, due to a trademark dispute over the "WWF" initials brought on by the World Wide Fund for Nature (WWF), from May 2002 until June 2012, they were not allowed to use the WWF "scratch" logo. As a result, any instances of someone saying "WWF" (though not World Wrestling Federation) were edited and shots of the "scratch" logo were either removed or blurred on re-airings or video releases released during that time frame, except for the United Kingdom exclusive WWE Tagged Classics DVD line. In late July 2012, WWE reached a settlement with the WWF which once again allows them to use the "WWF" initials and scratch logo on archive footage. Unedited footage first appeared on Raw 1000 and since then has appeared in full-length matches posted to the WWE website and home video releases. In exchange, WWE is no longer permitted to use the WWF initials or logo in any new, original footage, with any old logos for retro-themed programming now using the original WWF logo, but modified without the F.

Music rights issues are also reasons for occasional editing by WWE of its library when airing or releasing videos. While most wrestlers' entrance themes are done in-house (notably by composer Jim Johnston), those whose music is not owned by WWE are often dubbed over with cheaper alternatives rather than providing the original audio, to save WWE paying licensing fees to the writers/performers of the original songs. Videos heavily affected in particular by these cost-cutting decisions are those featuring footage from Extreme Championship Wrestling (ECW), which was famous for using recordings by mainstream music acts such as Metallica, AC/DC, and Dr. Dre for their wrestlers' entrances, although AC/DC and Metallica have provided music for WWE pay-per-view events as well. Exceptions to non-Johnston composed themes that WWE leaves in its archives are either songs that are in the public domain, such as the "Dawn" section of Also sprach Zarathustra used by Ric Flair and Pomp and Circumstance, which was used by Gorgeous George and later Randy Savage; or songs that the WWE acquired from its purchase of WCW. Additionally, wrestlers who worked for WWE but whose entrance music in other promotions may be owned by an outside company have had their songs in those promotions replaced by their WWE counterparts, such as Chris Jericho's World Championship Wrestling (WCW) theme being replaced by his WWE theme.

Due to a 1991 lawsuit, matches featuring Jesse Ventura on commentary were dubbed over for subsequent home video releases. However, matches featuring Ventura commentating are shown with unaltered audio on the WWE Network.

Since 2007, WWE has edited footage featuring Chris Benoit from repeat broadcasts, due to Benoit's murder-suicide. WWE has released some footage of Benoit from its library as well as WCW and ECW in the years since, but all of these have been group shots not focused on Benoit (most notably the 2004 Royal Rumble). Benoit's wife Nancy Benoit, who performed in a manager role in WCW under the ring name Woman, was also initially removed, but footage of her was later re-added. All archive footage of Chris Benoit has been available uncut on the WWE Network since its launch in 2014. Benoit's name is also never mentioned in the chapters selection, merely stating (insert opponent's name here) in singles action. Event posters that include Benoit, like Backlash 2004 have also been changed.

When WWE Network programming began being moved to Peacock in the United States in 2021, WWE and NBCUniversal (NCBU) began editing controversial content from WWE's past in order to meet NBCU's standards and practices; this also applied to the standalone WWE Network feed that remained overseas.

== See also ==
- History of WWE
- WWE Home Video
