= List of Hensuki characters =

The main cast of Hensuki. Clockwise from the center: Keiki Kiryū, Sayuki Tokihara, Mao Nanjō, Ayano Fujimoto, Koharu Ōtori, Mizuha Kiryū, and Yuika Koga.

The following article is a list of characters from the light novel, manga and anime series Hensuki.

== Main characters ==
=== Keiki Kiryū ===
Keiki Kiryū (桐生 慧輝, Kiryū Keiki)
Voiced by: Kōhei Amasaki (Drama CD), Hiro Shimono (TV anime) (Japanese); Clifford Chapin (English)
Keiki is a second-year high school student, assistant librarian and member of the calligraphy club. After cleaning up the club room he found a love letter left for him along with a pair of panties, and is now trying to track down the "Cinderella" who left these items for him.
Unfortunately for Keiki, he is harassed non-stop by the titular pervert girls; each wanting him to enable their kink, despite his flat refusal.
He is comedically oblivious to the fact Mizuha isn't his biological sister; she's only a few months younger than him. Though this was a blunder on his parents' part.

=== Sayuki Tokihara ===
Sayuki Tokihara (朱鷺原 紗雪, Tokihara Sayuki)
Voiced by: Ayaka Imamura (Drama CD), Ayana Taketatsu (TV anime) (Japanese); Mallorie Rodak (English)
Sayuki is a third-year student and president of the calligraphy club. She is a hardcore masochist who longs to be Keiki's "pet". She repeatedly uses hidden cameras to gain material with which to blackmail him into satisfying her fetish. She's known about Yuika's fetish from the first time they met and immediately became fierce rivals, constantly fighting for his attention. She is called "Witch" by Yuika.
Funnily enough, even though both aren't gay, Yuika and Sayuki end up satisfying each other's fetish in their fights; allowing Keiki to slip away from their insanity.

=== Yuika Koga ===
Yuika Koga (古賀 唯花, Koga Yuika)
Voiced by: Ari Ozawa (Drama CD), Rina Hidaka (TV anime) (Japanese); Madeleine Morris (English)
Yuika is a first-year student and assistant librarian with Keiki. She is one-quarter Caucasian, has blonde hair and blue eyes, and is initially shy and stand-offish, but warms up to Keiki's persistent attempts to get to know her. She's secretly a sadist who wishes to make Keiki her slave. She found out about Sayuki's fetish the first time they met and has been fighting to "protect" Keiki from the "Witch's" clutches.

=== Mao Nanjō ===
Mao Nanjō (南條 真緒, Nanjō Mao)
Voiced by: Satsumi Matsuda (Drama CD), Iori Nomizu (TV anime) (Japanese); Kristen McGuire (English)
Keiki's classmate and dear friend. She frequently hangs out with him and Shoma. She's secretly a fujoshi who constantly fantasizes about Keiki and Shoma in homoerotic situations, which she writes and illustrates in a published series. She begs Keiki to become an actual couple with Shoma to help fuel her fantasies and aid her in her work; even though it's just selfish delusion.

=== Mizuha Kiryū ===
Mizuha Kiryū (桐生 瑞葉, Kiryū Mizuha)
Voiced by: Yūki Kuwahara (Drama CD), Kaede Hondo (TV anime) (Japanese); Emily Neves (English)
Keiki's younger sister, who is very close to her brother and frequently "flirts" with him as Keiki puts it, ranging from pampering him and seeking to have him pamper her to sneaking into bed with him claiming suspicion he'd finally awaken as a siscon. It is later revealed that she is the "Cinderella" who left the love letter and her panties for Keiki, and that she was adopted after the death of her parents and thus non-blood related. In fifth grade, she once forgot to bring panties to change into after swim class and had to spend the entire day that way, which she found liberating. Afterwards, Mizuha developed an exhibitionist tendency, often going to school without panties and secretly taking strip tease selfies in order to experience this feeling of liberation. This habit is also the reason why her panties were left behind with her love letter.

=== Shōma Akiyama ===
Shōma Akiyama (秋山 翔馬, Akiyama Shōma)
Voiced by: Atsushi Tamaru (Drama CD), Keisuke Koumoto (TV anime) (Japanese); Jordan Dash Cruz (English)
Keiki's best friend. Though popular he's a confirmed lolicon. He regularly acts as a confidant for Keiki, helping him to figure out who the "Cinderella" may have been.

== Supporting characters ==
=== Koharu Ōtori ===
Koharu Ōtori (鳳 小春, Ōtori Koharu)
Voiced by: Ayaka Ōhashi (Japanese); Kate Bristol (English)
Koharu is a third-year from the Astronomy club. She's a stalker who engages in constant voyeurism. She is extremely tiny, resembling a small child. She's in love with Keiki's lolicon friend Shoma, but worries that despite her "loli" appearance he'd still refuse to date her on account of her being older than him. She thus uses secretly-taken photos to try and blackmail Keiki into helping her.

=== Ayano Fujimoto ===
Ayano Fujimoto (藤本 彩乃, Fujimoto Ayano)
Voiced by: Anzu Haruno (Japanese); Emi Lo (English)
Ayano is a second-year student, and vice-president of the student council. She engages in olfactophilia, and though she does sniff around the boy's locker room, she became especially attracted to Keiki's smell and frequently ask for his underwear.

=== Shiho Takasaki ===
Shiho Takasaki (鷹崎 志帆, Takasaki Shiho)
Shiho is a third-year student, and the president of the student council. Since Keiki frequently helped the student councils, they became acquainted. She enjoys playing video games. When the Calligraphy club misused club funding, she used her power to make Keiki a temporary student council member as one of the condition to forgive the club's debt. She expressed interest in Keiki specific due to his popularity with girls, as she has a strong netorare fetish, and gets excited for seeing the love of her life being stolen (or poached in the case of Keiki).

=== Airi Nagase ===
Airi Nagase (長瀬 愛梨, Nagase Airi)
Airi is a first-year student and the treasurer of the student council. Because of a traumatic experience in her past, which turned in fear, Airi is very cold towards men. She is said to be a tsundere because of her difference in treatment between men and women. It is revealed later that she likes and writes yuri novels, which often make Keiki wonder if she is homosexual.

=== Rin Mitani ===
Rin Mitani (三谷 凛, Mitani Rin)
Rin, nicknamed Rintaro (凛太郎, Rintarō), is a first-year student and the secretary of the student council. Although Rin usually looks like a boy, he cross-dresses as a girl when working with the student council.

=== Megumi Onizuka ===
Megumi Onizuka (鬼塚 恵, Onizuka Megumi)
Megumi is a second-year student and candidate for the next president of the student council. After losing the election to Ayano, Megumi becomes vice-president instead.

== Other characters ==
=== Professor Okita ===
Professor Okita (沖田先生, Okita-sensei)
Voiced by: Suzuko Mimori (Japanese); Cassie Ewulu (English)
Okita is a teacher at Momosawa High School and the calligraphy club advisor. It is implied throughout the series that Okita's in a secret relationship with one of her students.

=== Yūhi Akiyama ===
Yūhi Akiyama (秋山 優妃, Akiyama Yūhi)
Yūhi is Shōma's older sister, as well as Asahi's twin sister.

=== Asahi Akiyama ===
Asahi Akiyama (秋山 あさひ, Akiyama Asahi)
Asahi is Shōma's older sister, as well as Yūhi's twin sister.

=== Naoya Inui ===
Naoya Inui (乾 直也, Inui Naoya)
Naoya is a third-year student and childhood friend of Megumi, who later becomes her boyfriend.

=== Mifuyu Tokihara ===
Mifuyu Tokihara (朱鷺原 美冬, Tokihara Mifuyu)
Mifuyu is the mother of Sayuki Tokihara. She is not only aware of Sayuki's masochist fetish, but also seems to be just as pervert as she is, having the habit of peeking under girls' skirts and picking up their panties to collect.
