= Mia Regina =

Japanese idol group

- Origin: Tokyo, Japan
- Genres: J-pop; anime song
- Years active: 2016–2023
- Labels: Lantis
- Past members: Waka Kirishima; Fūri Uebana; Risuko Sasakama
- Website: miaregina.jp

Mia Regina (stylized as Mia REGINA) was a Japanese idol group from Tokyo signed to Lantis and affiliated with Dear Stage. Consisting of Waka Kirishima, Fūri Uebana, and Risuko Sasakama, the group began its activities in 2016, and has released 10 singles and three albums as of 2022. Its music has been featured in anime series such as Hensuki, Appare-Ranman!, and The Aquatope on White Sand.

== History ==
The group began its activities in 2016. Its members include Waka Kirishima, Fūri Uebana, and Risuko Sasakama, all of whom were also members of the Star Anis idol group associated with the anime series Aikatsu!. Their first single "Eternal Explorer" (ETERNALエクスプローラー) was released on August 24, 2016; the title track was used as the ending theme to the anime series Momokuri. Their next single "Chōmusubi Amulet" (蝶結びアミュレット) was released on October 26, 2016, with the title song being used as the opening theme to the anime series Matoi the Sacred Slayer.

The group released the single "My Sweet Maiden/Welcome To Our Diabolic Paradise" on April 26, 2017; the title tracks were used as the opening and ending themes respectively to the anime series Seven Mortal Sins. This was followed by the release of the single "Dear Teardrop" on February 28, 2018; the title song was used as the ending theme to the anime series Citrus.

They released the single "Mubyō no Hana" (無謬の花) on August 21, 2019; the title song was used as the ending theme to the anime series Hensuki. In 2021 they released the single "Tsukiumi no Yurigo" (月海の揺り籠); the title track was used as the first ending theme to the anime series The Aquatope on White Sand. They disbanded on July 16, 2023 after their solo concert held.

== Discography ==
=== Albums ===
List of albums with selected details, chart positions, and sales
Title	Details	Peak chart positions	Sales
Title	Details	JPN	Sales
That's a Fact!	Released: December 7, 2016; Label: Lantis; Formats: Digital download	188	—
Re! Re! Re!	Released: May 29, 2019; Label: Lantis; Formats: Digital download	243	—
Miauseum: Curation	Released: September 16, 2020; Label: Lantis; Formats: Digital download	125	—
"—" denotes releases that did not chart or were not released in that region.

=== Singles ===
List of singles with selected chart positions, year released, and album name
Title	Year	Peak chart positions	Sales	Album
Title	Year	JPN	Sales	Album
"Eternal Explorer"	2016	116	—	That's a Fact!
"Chōmusubi Amulet"	2016	85	—	That's a Fact!
"My Sweet Maiden/Welcome To Our Diabolic Paradise"	2017	111	—	Miauseum: Curation
"Dear Teardrop"	2018	93	—	Miauseum: Curation
"Junsei Erotic"	2018	152	—	Miauseum: Curation
"Mubyō no Hana"	2019	129	—	Miauseum: Curation
"Tsukiumi no Yurigo"	2020	101	—	Miauseum: Curation
"I got it!"	2021	78	—	Miauseum: Curation
"Fever Dreamer"	2021	50	—	TBD
"—" denotes releases that did not chart or were not released in that region.
