= Arcana Project =

Japanese female music group

- Genre: J-pop
- Years active: 2019–present
- Label: Lantis
- Members: Usa Sakurano; Shion Aida; Hikaru Amano; Yuka Shidomi; Sakura Yoshino
- Past members: Mai Sasaki; Aozora Sorano; Hana Hanamiya
- Website: www.arcana-project.com

Arcana Project (stylized as ARCANA PROJECT) is a Japanese vocal group. It is co-produced by Dearstage, inc. and Lantis. The group's motif is based on tarot cards, with each member assigned to a tarot card instead of color like other groups. Some of their songs are derived from tarot cards as well and most of all officially assigned to certain theme color.

== History ==
2020/Jan: Pre-debut live "0th Oracle".

2020/Mar: Pre-debut 0th single "Ace of Wands" released.

2020/May: 1st single "Campanella Hibiku Sora de" (カンパネラ響く空で) released. It is the opening theme for TV anime Monster Girl Doctor.

2020/Oct: 2nd single "Yume de Sekai o Kaeru nara" (夢で世界を変えるなら) released. It is the ending theme for TV anime Redo of Healer.

2021/Feb: Official fun club is established.

2021/Jul: 3rd single "Tayutae, Nanairo" (たゆたえ、七色) released. It is the opening theme for TV anime The Aquatope on White Sand (1st season).

2021/Oct: 4th single "Tomedonai Shiosai ni Boku-tachi wa Nani o Utau darō ka" (とめどない潮騒に僕たちは何を歌うだろうか) released. It is the opening theme for TV anime The Aquatope on White Sand (2nd season).

2022/Mar: Official cover song "Spring Storm"(春色ストーム) is published on YouTube. The song appears at the comic "Girl, plz make me concentrate on the class!?" (推しが隣で授業に集中できない！).

2022/May: Digital single "Revolutional Dawn" (革命的レイメイ) released.

2022/Aug: first appearance at Animelo Summer Live.

2022/Aug: First album "Genesis" released.

2023/: 5th single "Koi Goromo" (恋衣) released. It is the opening theme of TV anime "Malevolent Spirits: Mononogatari".

2023/: 6th single "Eureka" (ユリイカ) released. It is the ending theme of "SYNDUALITY Noir"

== Members ==
- Usa Sakurano (桜野 羽咲, Sakurano Usa) - The Empress
- Shion Aida (相田 詩音, Aida Shion) - Judgement
- Hana Hanamiya (花宮 ハナ, Hanamiya Hana) - The Magician
- Hikari Amano (天野 ひかる, Amano Hikaru) - The Star
- Yuka Shidomi (蔀 祐佳, Shidomi Yūka) - The Lovers (joined in April 29, 2025)
- Sakura Yoshino (吉乃 櫻, Yoshino Sakura) - The Fool (joined in April 29, 2025)

=== Past member ===
- Mai Sasaki (佐々木 麻衣, Sasaki Mai) - The World (graduated in March 2021)
- Aozora Sorano (空野 青空, Sorano Aozora) - Wheel of Fortune (also a member of Dempagumi.inc, graduated in June 2024 due to contract termination with Dearstage)

== Discography ==
=== Studio albums ===
| Title | Album details | Peak chart positions |
| Title | Album details | Oricon |
|---|---|---|
| Genesis (創世記) | Released: August 24, 2022; Label: Lantis; Formats: CD, digital download | 42 |

=== Singles ===
| Title | Year | Peak chart positions | Album |
| Title | Year | Oricon | Album |
|---|---|---|---|
| "Ace of Wands" | 2020 | — | Non-album single |
| "Campanella Hibiku Sora de" (カンパネラ響く空で) | 2020 | 28 | Genesis |
| "Yume de Sekai o Kaeru nara" (夢で世界を変えるなら) | 2021 | 32 | Genesis |
| "Tayutae, Nanairo" (たゆたえ、七色) | 2021 | 26 | Genesis |
| "Tomedonai Shiosai ni Boku-tachi wa Nani o Utau darō ka" (とめどない潮騒に僕たちは何を歌うだろうか) | 2021 | 22 | Genesis |
| "Revolutional Dawn" (革命的レイメイ) | 2022 | — | Non-album singles |
| "Koigoromo" (恋衣) | 2023 | 16 | Non-album singles |
| "Eureka" (ユリイカ) | 2023 | 19 | Non-album singles |
| "Aire" (アイレ) | 2024 | — | Non-album singles |
