= Malevolent Spirits: Mononogatari =

Japanese manga series

- First tankōbon volume cover

もののがたり (Mononogatari)
- Genre: Action, supernatural
- Manga
- Written by: Onigunsou
- Published by: Shueisha
- English publisher: NA: Seven Seas Entertainment
- Magazine: Miracle Jump (April 15, 2014 – December 15, 2015); Ultra Jump (January 19, 2016 – June 19, 2023)
- Original run: April 15, 2014 – June 19, 2023
- Volumes: 16
- Anime television series
- Directed by: Ryuichi Kimura
- Written by: Keiichirō Ōchi
- Music by: John Kanda; XELIK
- Studio: BN Pictures
- Licensed by: Crunchyroll
- Original network: Tokyo MX, BS11
- Original run: January 10, 2023 – September 19, 2023
- Episodes: 24
- icon

Malevolent Spirits: Mononogatari (Japanese: もののがたり, Hepburn: Mononogatari) is a Japanese manga series written and illustrated by Onigunsou. It was first serialized in Shueisha's seinen manga magazine Miracle Jump from April 2014 to December 2015, and it was later transferred to Ultra Jump where it continued from January 2016 to June 2023. An anime television series adaptation by BN Pictures was broadcast from January to March 2023. A second season aired from July to September 2023.

== Plot ==
Hyōma Kunato harbors a deep resentment toward spirits known as tsukumogami since they killed several of his family members, so he is sent to live with Botan Nagatsuki to help him see another side of them. Although both belong to a clan dedicated to using their divine powers to send spirits back to their world, their experiences with these vessels of otherworldly beings are very different. Hyōma had loved ones taken from him, while Botan was saved by tsukumogami.

== Characters ==
Hyōma Kunato (岐 兵馬, Kunato Hyōma)
Voiced by: Takeo Ōtsuka
The heir to the Kunato house of Saenome based in Tokyo. A pessimistic young man whose siblings were murdered by a tsukumogami, his attitude out in the field has resulted his grandfather sending him to live with the residents of the Nagatsuki house, in the hopes that he will learn to "love" tsukumogami again.
Botan Nagatsuki (長月 ぼたん, Nagatsuki Botan)
Voiced by: Yūki Takada
A young college student who lives with several benevolent tsukumogami in the Nagatsuki house. She is possessed by a marebito that is the target of most if not all Saenome factions, making her a highly valuable figure in the community. As such, she is protected by a neutrality law that prevents others from attacking her.
Nagi (薙)
Voiced by: Chikahiro Kobayashi
One of the several benevolent tsukumogami living in the Nagatsuki house.
Yu (結, Yū)
Voiced by: Reina Ueda
One of the several benevolent tsukumogami living in the Nagatsuki house.
Kagami (鏡)
Voiced by: Aimi Tanaka
One of the several benevolent tsukumogami living in the Nagatsuki house.
Suzuri (硯)
Voiced by: Yoshiki Nakajima
One of the six benevolent tsukumogami living in the Nagatsuki house.
Haori (羽織)
Voiced by: Miyuki Sawashiro
One of the several benevolent tsukumogami living in the Nagatsuki mansion. She serves as Zohei's primary contact for Hyoma's stay at Nagatsuki house.
Tsubaki Kadomori (門守 椿, Kadomori Tsubaki)
Voiced by: Saori Ōnishi
Taiju's only daughter. For unknown reasons, she is searching for the same tsukumogami that killed Hyoma's siblings.
Taiju Kadomori (門守 大樹, Kadomori Taiju)
Voiced by: Nobuaki Kanemitsu
The head of Kadomori House based in Kyoto. Although he offers Hyoma a chance to cooperate with him, his refusal to eliminate Botan and her tsukumogami results in him becoming his enemy. After witnessing Hyoma's abilities up close, he decides to proceed with his allowance for Hyoma to operate in Kyoto.
Shota Kadomori (門守 松太, Kadomori Shōta)
Voiced by: Shohei Tabuchi
Taiju's eldest son.
Umekichi Kadomori (門守 梅吉, Kadomori Umekichi)
Voiced by: Shinya Takahashi
Taiju's second son.
Kai (挂)
Voiced by: Taiten Kusunoki
Itsuki (斎)
Voiced by: Azusa Tadokoro
Karakasa no Tsukumogami (唐傘の付喪神)
Voiced by: Yoko Hikasa
Tsuzumi (鼓)
Voiced by: Kōhei Fukuhara
Tsumabiki (爪弾)
Voiced by: Mika Doi
Fukie (吹枝)
Voiced by: Yusuke Shirai
Tenjitsu
Voiced by: Hidenori Takahashi
Kushige
Voiced by: Akio Otsuka

== Media ==
=== Manga ===
Written and illustrated by Onigunsou, Malevolent Spirits: Mononogatari was first serialized in Shueisha's seinen manga magazine Miracle Jump from April 15, 2014, until the magazine's last issue, released on December 15, 2015. The series was transferred to Ultra Jump, where it continued from January 19, 2016, to June 19, 2023. Shueisha has collected its chapters into individual tankōbon volumes. The first volume was released on March 19, 2015. The sixteen and final volume was released on August 18, 2023.

The manga is licensed in North America by Seven Seas Entertainment.

==== Volumes ====
No.	Original release date	Original ISBN	English release date	English ISBN
1	March 19, 2015	978-4-08-890107-7	January 10, 2023	978-1-68579-670-9
2	April 17, 2015	978-4-08-890163-3	April 11, 2023	978-1-68579-680-8
3	December 18, 2015	978-4-08-890326-2	July 11, 2023	978-1-68579-681-5
4	May 19, 2016	978-4-08-890447-4	October 3, 2023	978-1-68579-929-8
5	December 19, 2016	978-4-08-890555-6	January 2, 2024	978-1-68579-955-7
6	June 19, 2017	978-4-08-890555-6	April 2, 2024	979-8-88843-315-7
7	January 19, 2018	978-4-08-890846-5	July 2, 2024	979-8-88843-655-4
8	June 19, 2018	978-4-08-891052-9	October 1, 2024	979-8-89160-190-1
9	January 18, 2019	978-4-08-891218-9	January 7, 2025	979-8-89160-191-8
10	September 19, 2019	978-4-08-891354-4	April 15, 2025	979-8-89160-919-8
11	May 19, 2020	978-4-08-891512-8	July 8, 2025	979-8-89373-001-2
12	January 19, 2021	978-4-08-891821-1	October 14, 2025	979-8-89373-676-2
13	November 19, 2021	978-4-08-892114-3	January 13, 2026	979-8-89373-677-9
14	May 18, 2022	978-4-08-892280-5	April 14, 2026	979-8-89373-678-6
15	January 19, 2023	978-4-08-892579-0	July 14, 2026	979-8-89373-679-3
16	August 18, 2023	978-4-08-892766-4	October 13, 2026	979-8-89561-380-1

=== Anime ===
In November 2021, it was announced that the series would receive an anime television series adaptation. It is produced by Bandai Namco Pictures and directed by Ryuichi Kimura, with scripts written by Keiichirō Ōchi, character designs handled by Shiori Fujisawa, and music composed by John Kanda and XELIK. The first season aired from January 10 to March 28, 2023, on Tokyo MX, BS11 and other networks. Arcana Project performed the opening theme song "Koigoromo" (恋衣), while True performed the ending theme song "Rebind". Crunchyroll streamed the series. The second season aired from July 4 to September 19, 2023. Megatera Zero performed the second season's opening theme song "Dare ga Tame" (誰が為), while Azusa Tadokoro performed the ending theme song "Private Room" (プライベート・ルーム, Puraibēto Rūmu).
