= Seaside Communications =

Canadian telecommunications company

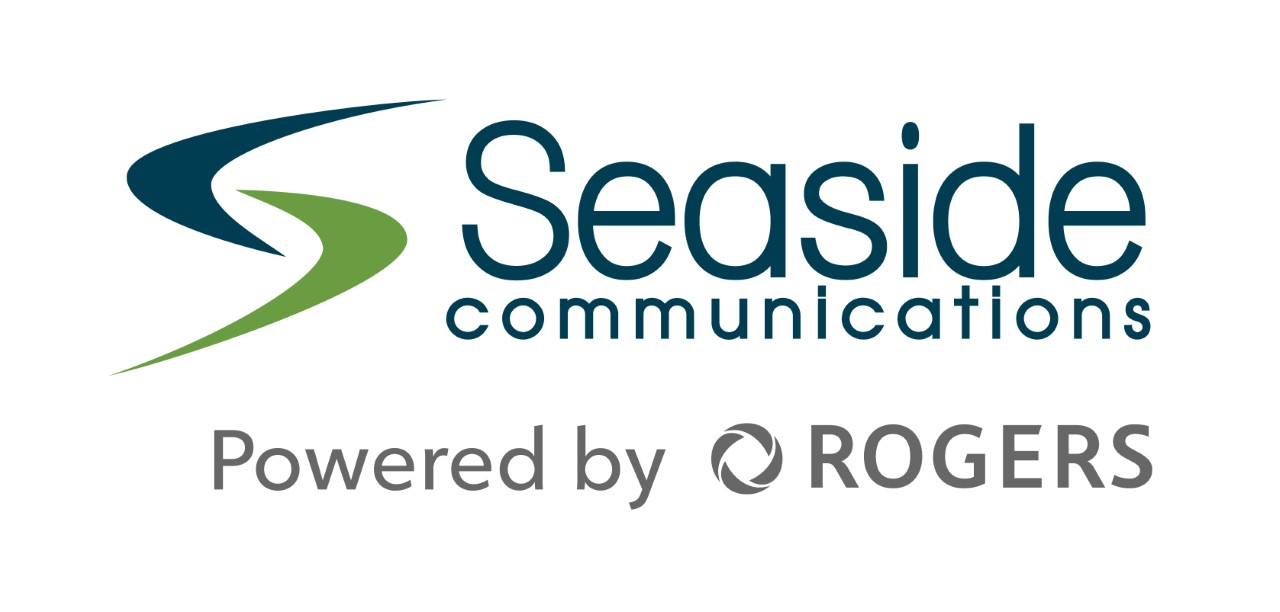
- Formerly: Seaside Cable TV (1975-2001)
- Type: Private
- Industry: Telecommunications
- Founded: 1975 (as Seaside Cable TV. Ltd.)
- Headquarters: Sydney, Nova Scotia, Canada
- Key people: Dean Abbass, Business Manager; Shane Ferguson, Network Manager; John MacNeil, Cable Infrastructure; Barbara Hayes, Advertising
- Products: Digital television; Cable high speed internet; Telephone
- Number of employees: 100 (2015)
- Parent: Rogers Communications
- Website: www.seaside.ns.ca

Seaside Communications is a Canadian cable television and telecommunications company. In 1975, Seaside was established in Sydney, Nova Scotia, when it was issued a cable licence from the CRTC. On August 23, 2021, Rogers Communications purchased Seaside Communications for an undisclosed amount.

== Products ==
Digital, high-definition television and analog television, high-speed internet, home phone.

== Service areas ==
Glace Bay, Nova Scotia, New Waterford, Nova Scotia, Reserve Mines, Louisbourg, Baddeck, Nova Scotia, St. Peter's, Nova Scotia, and surrounding communities such as Albert Bridge, Hornes Road, Hillside, Hills Road, Marion Bridge, Carabin's Trailer Park, Main-à-Dieu, Neal Cove, Bateston, Catalone and Catalone Road. Seaside signed a partnership agreement on July 6, 2020, with Eskasoni Communications to provide fibre optic service in Eskasoni First Nation.

== Company history ==
- 1975 Seaside Cable TV Ltd.
- 1984 Seaside Cable TV (1984) Ltd. (Ownership Change) 1988 Seaside expands to the communities of Albert Bridge, Hornes Road, Hillside, Hills Road, Marion Bridge, Carabin's Trailer Park, Main-à-Dieu, Neal Cove, Bateston, Catalone and Catalone Road.
- 1991 Seaside acquires River Bourgeois Cablevision Limited.
- 1992 Seaside acquires Baddeck Cable T.V. Company Ltd.
- 1992 Seaside acquires St. Peter's Cablevision Limited.
- 2000 Seaside Communications Inc. (Name Change)
- 2006 Seaside adds Video on demand (VOD) services to its lineup.
- 2020 Seaside partners with Eskasoni Communications to provide service in the community.
- 2021 Rogers Communications acquires Seaside.
