= List of Hensuki episodes =

Hensuki
- Promotional poster for the anime
- No. of episodes: 12

Release
- Original network: AT-X, Tokyo MX, MBS, BS11
- Original release: July 8 – September 23, 2019

The anime television series Hensuki is based on the light novel series of the same name written by Tomo Hanama and illustrated by sune. The adaptation was announced on February 20, 2019. The series was animated by Geek Toys and directed by Itsuki Imazaki, with Kenichi Yamashita handling series composition, and Yōsuke Itō designing the characters. Youichi Sakai composed the series' music. Seven was credited for animation production assistance. Ayaka Ōhashi performed the series' opening theme song "Daisuki", (Note: ダイスキ。) which was also used as the ending theme for the twelfth episode. Mia Regina performed the series' ending theme song "Mubyū no Hana". (Note: 無謬の花) Regina also performed the theme song "Nagareboshi", (Note: 流れ星) which was inserted into the seventh episode. "Sutera", (Note: ステラ) which is performed by TRUE, was used as the ending theme for the seventh episode.

The series aired from July 8 to September 23, 2019, on AT-X, Tokyo MX, MBS, and BS11. The series ran for 12 episodes. The series is licensed in North America by Funimation, in Australia and New Zealand by Madman Entertainment, and in Southeast Asia and South Asia by Muse Communication. A short anime spin-off titled Hensuki▽ ran after episodes of the main anime on AT-X. The shorts were directed and written by Itsuki Imazaki.

== Episode list ==
No.	Title	Original release date
1	"Cinderella Dropped Her Panties!?"; Transliteration: "Pantsu o otoshita shinderera!?" (Japanese: パンツを落としたシンデレラ！？)	July 8, 2019
Yuika Koga, Mao Nanjō and Keiki Kiryū's sister, Mizuha Kiryū went to the Calligraphy Club room to help Keiki Kiryū and Sayuki Tokihara to clean up because the room is filled with thrown-away papers from Sayuki's preparation for the calligraphy competition. The girls left the room after the cleanup. When Keiki returns to the classroom after he throws away the wastewater from the cleaning, he saw a nameless love letter that addresses to Keiki and a panty. He consults his best friend Shōma Akiyama on this matter and concluded that the one who wrote could be either one of the girls who helped in the cleanup except for Mizuha. He started his investigation with Sayuki and decided to hang out with her. Rather than unravelling the mystery of the love letter, he found out that Sayuki is actually a masochist and wants him to make her his pet.
2	"Indecisive Prince!?"; Transliteration: "Yūjū fudan na ōji-sama!?" (Japanese: 優柔不断な王子様！？)	July 15, 2019
With the investigation on Sayuki fails to identify the sender of the love letter, he decided to investigate Yuika and decided to hang out with her after a brief discussion with his best friend. Again, just like the previous investigation on Sayuki, there is no conclusion on the identity of the sender but instead finding out Yuika is a sadist and wants him to be her slave.
3	"Cinderella is Shy!?"; Transliteration: "Hazukashigari ya no shinderera!?" (Japanese: 恥ずかしがりやのシンデレラ！？)	July 22, 2019
The two failed investigations have left Keiki with the weird love pursuit of Yuika and Sayuki. Both of them tried all sorts of way to get Keiki, including Yuika's tactics of tricking him in an empty classroom to tie him up. Mao saved the tied up Keiki from Yuika's hand when Yuika and Sayuki are both arguing with each other on who should have him. Mao then proceeds to express her dislike of Keiki being around with the two girls after loosening him.
4	"Cinderella Can't Come Out!?"; Transliteration: "Sunao ni narenai shinderera!?" (Japanese: 素直になれないシンデレラ！？)	July 29, 2019
After the incident where Keiki was tied up, Sayuki and Yuika decided to lay down their pursuit of Keiki temporarily. Keiki tries to make up with Mao after that incident, even went out to the arcade centre with her and his best friend. After Keiki's last-ditch effect to make up with her, Mao reveals that she is a BL fan and wanted him to date his best friend Shōma. She reveals that she in love with Keiki in her monologue. With Mao's revelation, all of the sender's identity candidates are all ruled out. Keiki then received a photo of him touching Sayuki's breast and a letter in his shoebox.
5	"Operation: Koharu is a First-Year Student"; Transliteration: ""Koharu-chan wa ichi nenseidayo☆" dai sakusen" (Japanese: 『小春ちゃんは一年生だよ☆』大作戦)	August 5, 2019
Keiki went and meet the blackmailer in the astronomy clubroom after reading the blackmail. He found out that the blackmailer is a petite girl named Koharu Ōtori who wears a hoody. Koharu wanted him to help her to get close to his best friend as she is in love with him. He then, a little unwillingly, went and try to make the relationship between Shōma and Koharu happen. It went smoothly. Later, after a discussion with Koharu about the investigation on the identity of the love letter sender, he decided to go the building block where the clubrooms are situated. And then, he saves a girl who will become the candidate for the sender's identity from falling off the stairs who then plants her head into him while blushing.
6	"Cinderella Came Falling Down!?"; Transliteration: "Ochitekita shinderera!?" (Japanese: 落ちてきたシンデレラ！？)	August 12, 2019
During his investigation on the sender's identity, he meet the girl that he saved the day before, Ayano Fujimoto. She plants her face into him after having a short conversation with him. Yuika once again engages in a love pursuit for Keiki. While he and Sayuki volunteer in cleaning up the riverside, just like Yuika, Sayuki once again engages in a love pursuit for Keiki. After gotten away from Sayuki's weird pursuit, Keiki picks up Ayano who fell into the river and lent her his sports jacket. Ayano invites him to the student council room as a sign of gratitude and tries to make him fall asleep to get his underwear. Keiki woke up in a shock and heard Ayano's confession that she is olfactophilia who love boy's sweet smell and that she is attracted to his smell.
7	"Operation: Koharu is a First-Year Student - Conclusion"; Transliteration: ""Koharu-chan wa ichi nenseidayo☆" dai sakusen kanketsu hen" (Japanese: 『小春ちゃんは一年生だよ☆』大作戦 完結篇)	August 19, 2019
In order to further Koharu's relation with Shōma, Keiki recommended a double date with him, Sayuki, Koharu and Shōma in the bowling alley. With that, Koharu decided to confess her love to Shōma and admitting that she is a third-year student. Shōma rejected her confession, leaving Koharu broken-hearted. Later, Shōma went to the astronomy club room to apologize to Koharu for the way he rejected her. He decided to be her friend first before dating each other. Shōma found out and was shocked that she is a stalker that took a lot of his pictures by turning on the clubroom's light and saw that his pictures are all over the clubroom.
8	"The Prince Lost His Panties!?"; Transliteration: "Pantsu o nakushita ōji sama!?" (Japanese: パンツをなくした王子様！？)	August 26, 2019
During the weekend, Sayuki and Yuika went to visit Keiki in his house on separate occasions. They asked him to "love" them in weird ways, which creates a misunderstanding with his sister. Mao then calls him and chat with him for a moment. Later, he founds out that the panty that he received together with the love letter had disappeared. After a discussion on the matter regarding the sender's identity and the disappearance of the panty with Koharu and Shōma, Keiki decided to become Sayuki's master and bring her on a date to get his answer once and for all.
9	"Operation: Keiki is a Master Now!!"; Transliteration: ""Toshi kagayaku n wa go shujin samadayo★" dai sakusen!" (Japanese: 『慧輝くんはご主人様だよ★』大作戦！)	September 2, 2019
Keiki went on a date with Sayuki in the amusement park while trying to identify whether she is the sender by trying to get know what panty she is wearing. He fails to do so throughout the date and decided to order Sayuki to show her panty. Shockingly, he found out Sayuki is not wearing any and later, found out Sayuki had stolen his underwear when he tries to get to confess to being the thief of the panty. He then tries to found out on whether Yuika is the thief but is instead caught red-handed while trying to snoop on her panty closet. With that, Keiki is forced to become her slave.
10	"The Prince Became a Slave!?"; Transliteration: "Dorei ni natta ōji sama!?" (Japanese: 奴隷になった王子様！？)	September 9, 2019
With Keiki becoming Yuika's slave, Yuika asks him to do a lot of things like a servant does. Yuika reveals her past regarding her grandmother and recalls briefly Keiki's approach on her. Keiki then found out that she stole his underwear, just like Sayuki. With that, Keiki freed from being Yuika's slave. Mao later approaches him to chat with him and draw a picture for her BL manga. Keiki met Ayano on the way to the astronomy club room. Ayano plants her face unto Keiki to smell him. She then proceeds to give him a ticket for five-person to the public swimming pool because she didn't want to go there. Keiki went to the club room and have a revelation on the identity of the sender after helping to pick up Koharu's photo.
11	"Cinderella Took Off Her Swimwear?!"; Transliteration: "Mizugi o nuida shinderera!?" (Japanese: 水着を脱いだシンデレラ！？)	September 16, 2019
Keiki treats his girls on a swimming party using the stub that he earned on the previous episode. The girls, particularly Sayuki and Yuika, compete to gain Keiki's attention though he wants to please everyone. He ended up to his younger sister, Mizuha, alone in the indoor pool and suffers a cramp. She remembers how Keiki carried her when they're young to which Keiki seemingly forgets and notices Mizuha's growth. Meanwhile, Koharu conducts a contest where participants must deliver a convincing confession to the person they admire. As the girls compete and take advantage to convey their feelings to Keiki indirectly, the latter evaluates their confessions and continues to deduce who is the "Cinderella" among them. Mizuha wins the contest by gaining much applause from the audience. Afterwards, Keiki flips Mizuha's skirt to see her panties which finally confirms his theory. Mizuha admits that she is the one who left the love letter and her panty on the Calligraphy Club room, hid in the locker room and quickly sprinted out to evade Keiki. She also confessed that she is in love with Keiki because of his kindness, caring and understanding personality. Keiki downplays Mizuha's confession as they cannot be in a relationship as they're siblings but she corrects him by recalling their birth dates. Mizuha also tells Keiki that they have the same age, only five months apart. With this, Mizuha concludes that they're not siblings at all.
12	"Are You Willing to Fall in Love with a Pervert, as Long as She's a Cutie?"; Transliteration: "Kawaikereba hentai demo suki ni natte kuremasuka?" (Japanese: 可愛ければ××でも〇〇になってくれますか？)	September 23, 2019
Mizuha continues her romantic advances to Keiki, to which the latter reiterates that they're siblings. He becomes irritated that he decided to left the house, ignores Mizuha's messages and wanders off the streets and recollects how Mizuha arrived in the Kiryu household. He asks to stay overnight with Shoma and Koharu but to no avail. Rain falls and Keiki suddenly gets wet, acquiring fever upon arriving at their home. Mizuha tends Keiki on his fever while Sayuki and Yuika pay him a visit. Later that night, his fever gradually dies down and decides to go to the bathroom, only seeing a naked Mizuha. He asks Mizuha why she fell in love with him, and the latter remembers Keiki's endearing remark upon her arrival at the household years ago, as well as how Keiki treats her totally as a sibling. Keiki and Mizuha finally come to their terms to endear each other as siblings. In the conclusion of the series, they continue their respective lives as family yet Mizuha slowly and continuously flirts to Keiki which in fact she asks him to become her boyfriend even for a day. Keiki obliges her request and during their date, Keiki contemplates that he is surrounded by girls with weird fetishes in life. Much to his surprise, he discovers Mizuha is an exhibitionist as seeing her pictures wearing only underwear or being half-naked. Mizuha tells Keiki that she will only do that to him if they're lovers, but Keiki bluntly declines.

== See also ==
- List of Hensuki volumes
