= Date A Live Fragment: Date A Bullet =

Japanese light novel series

- Cover of Date A Live Fragment: Date A Bullet volume 1 as published by Fujimi Shobo, featuring the "White Queen" and Kurumi Tokisaki

デート・ア・ライブ フラグメント デート・ア・バレット (Dēto A Raibu Furagumento Dēto A Baretto)
- Light novel
- Written by: Yuichiro Higashide; Kōshi Tachibana
- Illustrated by: NOCO
- Published by: Fujimi Shobo
- Imprint: Fujimi Fantasia Bunko
- Original run: March 18, 2017 – present
- Volumes: 8
- Anime film

Date A Bullet: Dead or Bullet
- Directed by: Jun Nakagawa
- Written by: Yuichiro Higashide
- Music by: Go Sakabe
- Studio: Geek Toys
- Licensed by: Crunchyroll LLC
- Released: August 14, 2020
- Runtime: 24 minutes
- Anime film

Date A Bullet: Nightmare or Queen
- Directed by: Jun Nakagawa
- Written by: Yuichiro Higashide
- Music by: Go Sakabe
- Studio: Geek Toys
- Licensed by: Crunchyroll LLC
- Released: November 13, 2020
- Runtime: 29 minutes
- Other
- Date A Live; Date A Live: Mayuri Judgement

Date A Live Fragment: Date A Bullet (Japanese: デート・ア・ライブ フラグメント デート・ア・バレット, Hepburn: Dēto A Raibu Furagumento Dēto A Baretto) is a Japanese spin-off light novel series of the Date A Live series written by Kōshi Tachibana. The series is written by Yuichiro Higashide under Kōshi Tachibana's supervision and illustrated by NOCO. A two-part anime film adaptation by Geek Toys was announced, with the first part Dead or Bullet premiering on August 14, 2020, and the second part Nightmare or Queen premiering on November 13, 2020.

== Plot ==
Hibiki Higoromo, better known as Empty, is an amnesiac young girl. She wakes up in the Neighboring World, where she encounters Kurumi Tokisaki. In order to kill the mysterious girl, Kurumi leads Empty to a school. When arriving at the school, a number of girls, known as Quasi-Spirits, gather together. Now, a new battle begins.

== Characters ==
Kurumi Tokisaki (時崎 狂三, Tokisaki Kurumi)
Voiced by: Asami Sanada
A clone of Kurumi Tokisaki that ended up in the Neighboring World after her death. She is known as Empty (エンプティ, Enputi) when her identity was stolen by Hibiki Higoromo.
White Queen (白の女王(クイーン), Kuīn)
Voiced by: Saori Ōnishi
The Dominion of the Third Region: Binah. She is also known as White Kurumi. It is revealed that her dominant personality is Kurumi's childhood friend, Sawa Yamauchi (山打紗和, Yamauchi Sawa).
Hibiki Higoromo (緋衣(ひごろも) 響(ひびき), Higoromo Hibiki)
Voiced by: Kaede Hondo
A mysterious person who approaches Kurumi.
Tsuan (蒼(ツァン), Tsuan)
Voiced by: Mariya Ise
A Quasi-Spirit who is infamous for being a veteran fighter who has killed 100 people with a single blow.
Panie Ibusuki (指(いぶ)宿(すき)パニエ, Ibusuki Panie)
Voiced by: Rina Hidaka
A Quasi-Spirit who was the Dominion of the Tenth Region: Malkuth. Her real name is Doll Master (人形遣(ドールマスター), Dōru Masutā).
Yui Sagakure (佐(さ)賀(が)繰(くれ)唯(ゆい), Sagakure Yui)
Voiced by: Asami Seto
A seventh type Quasi-Spirit.
Isami Hijikata (土方イサミ, Hijikata Isami)
Voiced by: Natsumi Fujiwara
A first type Quasi-Spirit.

== Media ==
=== Light novels ===
Date A Live Fragment: Date A Bullet began serialization as a light novel on March 18, 2017, under Fujimi Shobo's Fujimi Fantasia Bunko. The series is written by Yuichiro Higashide and illustrated by NOCO, with Kōshi Tachibana as the supervisor. To date, eight volumes have been released in Japan.

No.	Japanese release date	Japanese ISBN
1	March 18, 2017	978-4-0407-2239-9
2	August 19, 2017	978-4-0407-2240-5
3	April 20, 2018	978-4-0407-2239-9
4	August 18, 2018	978-4-0407-2872-8
5	March 20, 2019	978-4-0407-3105-6
6	March 19, 2020	978-4-0407-3372-2
7	November 20, 2020	978-4-0407-3779-9
8	January 20, 2022	978-4-04-074363-9

=== Anime film ===
The anime project was first revealed on September 17, 2019. On September 23, 2019, an anime adaptation of the spin-off series was announced, later revealed to be a theatrical film. On May 18, 2020, it was announced that the series will be a prequel to the novels, and the title of the series is confirmed as Dead or Bullet. It is animated by Geek Toys and directed by Jun Nakagawa, with Yuichiro Higashide writing the script, and Naoto Nakamura designing the characters. It was revealed that the adaptation will be a two-part film series. The first film, Date A Bullet: Dead or Bullet, premiered on August 14, 2020, followed by the second film, Date A Bullet: Nightmare or Queen, which premiered on November 13, 2020. Funimation licensed the first film.

No.	Title	Original release date
1	"Date A Bullet: Dead or Bullet"; Transliteration: "Dēto A Baretto Deddo oa Baretto" (Japanese: デート・ア・バレット デッド・オア・バレット)	August 14, 2020
In a flash forward, Kurumi Tokisaki confronts White Queen, who plans to destroy the Neighboring World, and fights her. In the present, Kurumi, the clone who was killed by the original in "Kurumi Star Festival / Encore", falls into another world and is woken up by a cat. An announcer says it is time for the death game to begin. Yui Sagakure attacks the confused Kurumi, but is driven off. Kurumi rescues Hibiki Higoromo and demands answers, so she explains that they are in the Neighboring World, a place where Spirits go when they die, but Spirits are all but extinct there and there are only Quasi-Spirits. This is a battle royale to the death for the right to earn a wish. The contestants are Kurumi, Hibiki, Tsuan aka Biscuit Smasher, Yui Sagakure, Isami Hijikata, Ayame Takeshita (who had already been killed), Panie Ibusuki aka Doll Master, and White Queen. Hibiki proposes an alliance until they eliminate the others, saying her wish is to revive her friend, and Kurumi agrees. Tsuan attacks and knocks Kurumi into a building. Panie appears and proposes an alliance, but Kurumi refuses to betray Hibiki. Angered, Panie attacks, but after asserting her wish is to reunite with her love, Shido Itsuka, Kurumi is able to access her time manipulating Angel, Zafkiel. Panie panics and runs away, then Tsuan, Yui, and Isami appear to challenge Kurumi. White Queen confronts Panie and thanks her for helping Kurumi reach her full potential before killing her.
2	"Date A Bullet: Nightmare or Queen"; Transliteration: "Dēto A Baretto Naitomea oa Kuīn" (Japanese: デート・ア・バレット ナイトメア・オア・クイーン)	November 13, 2020
A flashback has a young Kurumi discuss getting boyfriends with her friend Sawa Yamauchi. Kurumi, Tsuan, Yui, and Isami fight, with Isami wanting to avenge Ayame's death at the hands of Panie. Hibiki reunites with Kurumi and they escape. Tsuan kills Isami, but Yui proposes an alliance to kill White Queen after learning the wish is a lie and that White Queen plans to destroy the Neighboring World. Hibiki says this place used to be inhabited, but multiple death games whittled the population to just them. They meet the cat from earlier, who gives Kurumi a note that reads, "Help Me". After using her powers to see the note's past, she deduces Hibiki is White Queen in disguise and she turned the real Hibiki into the cat. White Queen reveals herself and attacks, but Tsuan and Yui attack her, allowing Kurumi and the cat to escape. White Queen quickly kills Tsuan and Yui, then challenges Kurumi to a fight. As they fight, White Queen reveals she is actually Sawa, who had fused with another Kurumi clone. She wanted revenge on Kurumi for killing her and arranged the death games because she hated everyone and to absorb strength from the fallen. She changes her mind and wants to be friends again, but Kurumi says arranging the death games is unforgivable. Kurumi mortally wounds her and they reconcile before she dies. With her death, the cat turns back into Hibiki. Kurumi vows to escape the Neighboring World and reunite with Shido, and Hibiki offers to be her companion.
