= Geek Pictures =

Japanese media corporation

Geek Pictures, Inc.
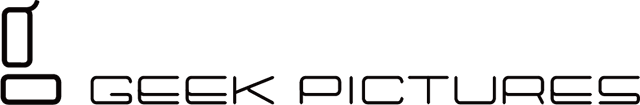
- Native name: 株式会社ギークピクチュアズ
- Romanized name: Kabushiki-gaisha Gīku Pikuchuazu
- Company type: Kabushiki gaisha
- Industry: Mass media, entertainment
- Founded: February 5, 2007; 19 years ago
- Headquarters: Kita-Aoyama, Minato, Tokyo, Japan
- Key people: Tamotsu Osano (president)
- Total equity: ¥60,000,000
- Number of employees: 150 (as of 2017)
- Divisions: Geek Harajuku; Geek Ginza; Geek Akasaka; Geek Creative Studio; Geek Design
- Subsidiaries: see below
- Website: geekpictures.co.jp

Geek Pictures, Inc. (Japanese: 株式会社ギークピクチュアズ, Hepburn: Kabushiki-gaisha Gīku Pikuchuazu) is a Japanese mass media corporation headquartered in Shibuya, Tokyo. The company manufactures and distributes various types of products, including movies, music videos, and television commercials, using new technologies such as augmented reality, virtual reality, 3D computer graphics, and panoramic photography.

== Establishment ==
Founded in 2007, the company operates as film and television producers. It has opened several subsidiary studios throughout the years and firmed business alliance with Japanese media corporation Toei Company since 2019.

== Subsidiaries ==
Studio	Location	Foundation date	Person in charge
Geek Pictures Shanghai	Xuhui, Shanghai, China	February 2011	Tamotsu Osano
Geek Pictures Singapore	Shenton Way, Singapore	November 2013	John Yamamoto
Geek Pictures Bangkok	Bangkapi, Bangkok, Thailand	February 18, 2017	Jamie Popham
Geek Sight	Shibuya, Tokyo, Japan	December 2008	Tamotsu Osano
Geek Lab	Shibuya, Tokyo, Japan	May 9, 2017	Tamotsu Osano
Geek Toys	Nakano, Tokyo, Japan	October 2017	Tamotsu Osano
Red Geek Pictures	Shibuya, Tokyo, Japan	August 20, 2019	Shouta Yamamoto
Geek Pictures India	Delhi, India	October 22, 2019	Arjun Aggarwal
