= Headhunted to Another World =

Japanese manga series

- Headhunted to Another World: From Salaryman to Big Four!
- First tankōbon volume cover, featuring Dennosuke Uchimura (top left) and Ulmandra (bottom right)

サラリーマンが異世界に行ったら四天王になった話 (Sararīman ga Isekai ni Ittara Shitennō ni Natta Hanashi)
- Genre: Isekai
- Manga
- Written by: Benigashira
- Illustrated by: Muramitsu
- Published by: Overlap
- English publisher: NA: Seven Seas Entertainment
- Imprint: Gardo Comics
- Magazine: Comic Gardo
- Original run: December 27, 2019 – present
- Volumes: 13
- Anime television series
- Directed by: Michio Fukuda; Seung-Deok Kim (assistant)
- Written by: Hiroko Fukuda
- Music by: Takafumi Wada
- Studio: Geek Toys; CompTown (Note: Animation production assistance (アニメーション制作協力) for all episodes provided by Jumondou.)
- Licensed by: Crunchyroll (streaming); SA/SEA: Medialink
- Original network: Tokyo MX, BS11, AT-X
- Original run: January 6, 2025 – March 24, 2025
- Episodes: 12

Headhunted to Another World: From Salaryman to Big Four! (Japanese: サラリーマンが異世界に行ったら四天王になった話, Hepburn: Sararīman ga Isekai ni Ittara Shitennō ni Natta Hanashi) is a Japanese manga series written by Benigashira and illustrated by Muramitsu. It began serialization on Overlap's Comic Gardo manga website in December 2019. An anime television series adaptation produced by Geek Toys and CompTown aired from January to March 2025.

== Characters ==
=== The Demon King's Court ===
Dennosuke Uchimura (ウチムラデンノスケ, Uchimura Dennosuke)
Voiced by: Yūki Ono (Japanese); Joshua Waters (English)
A Japanese salaryman who is hardworking and dedicated to his tasks, but was constantly overlooked by his superiors despite his achievements in the field. Overrun by a careless motorist, he is abruptly summoned into another world where a Demon King has decided to appoint him as one of his Four Elite Generals ("Four Heavenly Kings" (四天王, Shitennō) in Japanese) to raise an army and conquer the world. As an "Overseas Manager", the Demon King has assigned Uchimura to a rank representing the element of water.
Despite his lingering low self-esteem, Uchimura has a knack for analyzing a given situation and determine the best way of negotiating the resulting hazards; and as a completely nonmagical person, he is immune to attacks which affect mana-endowed beings, which most of the other world's inhabitants are. In recognition for his services, the Demon King later promotes Uchimura to the rank of Supreme Tennō of the Demon Army.
Ulmandra (ウルマンダー, Urumandā)
Voiced by: Konomi Kohara (Japanese); Taylor Murphy (English)
A red-haired demon woman with a very short temper, and one of the Demon King's Four Elite Generals who bears the title Inferno Assailant, representing the element of fire. She is a princess from the Empire of Kuryū, but fled to the Demon King's nation, of whom her father Mandra was a staunch ally, after Mandra's servant Buzzan pushed his lord from the throne and usurped the nation's rulership for himself. She is a powerful melée combatant, and can use her innate magic to generate fire and cover her arms with dragon armor and sharp claws. She is at first unimpressed with Uchimura, considering him too weak to join the Elite Generals' ranks. But upon seeing his skill and patience in negotiating vital alliances for the Demon King (a sector in which she has constantly failed due to her impatience), she forms a crush on him, though he is completely oblivious.
Demon King (魔王, Maō)
Voiced by: Akio Otsuka (Japanese); John Burgmeier (English)
Uchimara's new employer in a fantasy world, who was impressed by his work record and organization skills, and has therefore decided to make him one of his Generals to forge alliances with neighboring humanoid tribes and raise a Demon Army to conquer the world.
Sylphid (シルフィード, Shirufīdo) / Belinda (ベリンダ, Berinda)
Voiced by: Takanori Hoshino（costumed identity） / Yui Ishikawa ("Belinda") (Japanese); William Ofoegbu (costumed identity), Hollis Beck (Belinda form) (English)
A well-endowed, spectacle-wearing elven woman, Sylphid is one of the Four Elite Generals bearing the title Mage of Storms, associated with the element of air, and the Demon King's magic specialist. She is a former member of the Lordpent merchant family, who left her clan after getting disgusted by their greed and corruption. In public, she habitually keeps herself hidden under a bulky leather outfit and an oversized, six-eyed hood, even from her fellow Generals, in an attempt to remain anonymous whenever she wants to laze around. When forced into an appearance, she passes herself off as her own personal assistant, Belinda. After Uchimura uncovers her ruse, he learns the basics of magic from her by the Demon King's order.
Genome (ゲーノーム, Gēnōmu)
Voiced by: Nene Hieda (Japanese); Monica Rial (English)
A female cat demihuman, one of the Four Elite Generals and bearer of the titulation Earth Defender, as an association with the element of earth. She was born in the Sylvanian Empire, a northern, permanently frozen realm. She usually keeps most of her features hidden beneath a winter coat, a scarf covering her mouth, and her bangs, leaving only one eye visible. Uchimura wins her respect and affection after he uses his talents to restructure the Demon Army's organization and logistics to repel a wyvern incursion meant to feed their master, one of the other world's Calamities.
Orle (オルル, Oruru)
Voiced by: Chitose Morinaga (Japanese); Kara Edwards (English)
A female ogre and Ogre's daughter. More empathic than her father, and aware of the dilapidated state of her tribe, she wants to prevent a failure of her father's succession and the resulting civil war. After Uchimura has Orle negotiate with the ogre tribe's declining allies to join the Demon King instead, and thus making Ogre realize that he needs to change his policies, she later joins Uchimura, on whom she has formed a crush, as his personal aide and a representative of her people in the Demon Army.
Neia (ネイア)
Voiced by: Ayami Tsukui (Japanese); Jalitza Delgado (English)
A pre-adolescent elf girl and a low-ranking member of the Lordpent Clan. When Uchimura and Sylphid decide to investigate the corruption within the Trading Guild perpetrated by Sylphid's half-brother Viper, the latter sends Neia to Uchimura as a mole to prevent Uchimura from finding crucial evidence, using her family as his hostages and brutal physical abuse to enforce her cooperation. However, Uchimura realizes her situation, and after liberating her, Neia helps exposing Viper, getting him expelled from the Guild's leadership and arrested. In the aftermath, she is adopted into Uchimura's team as a trainee under Orle's tutelage. During her forced servitude under Viper, she acquired the ability to read people, making her able to discern their hidden intentions.
Uroar
A kobold and the leader of the Demon Army's demihuman divisions, a veteran archer, and Lilim's rival. While accompanying Uchimura to Kuryū to save Ulmandra, and he and Lilim end up fighting a Calamity, he confesses that he is actually in love with her, and the two become a couple.
Lilim
A succubus and the leader of the Demon Army's demon divisions, and Uroar's rival. Also known as the Onslaught Princess. While haughty to most people, she deeply respects Ulmandra. She later forms a relationship with Uroar.

=== Merchants ===
Butagarian (ブタガリアン)
Voiced by: Hidenobu Kiuchi (Japanese); Adam Rowe (English)
A wealthy pig demihuman merchant and commercial strategist who is well connected in the other world. While some call him The Prophet (預言者, Yogen-sha) for his success, his practices of making trade in war-ravaged nations have also earned him the sinister byname Merchant of Death (死の商人, Shi no Shōnin); but he is also revealed to be a caring family man with a large number of adopted war orphans. After Uchimura opens a trade agreement with the Land of Gold for Rosemarin Stones, Butagarian has his children steal them from the Demon King's domain to sell them to the Rampage King without incurring the expenses for their manufacture. Uchimura sets a trap for him using dummy stones, but he persuades Rampage King to spare the merchant because he is the only known supplier for a very rare mineral the Land of Gold needs for its mining operations; a deed which earns him Butagarian's respect and cooperation.
Danni (ダニー, Danī)
One of Butagarian's adopted children, a blackhaired female elf wearing a patch over her right eye. She helps Uchimura when he travels to the empire of Kuryū to save Ulmandra from captivity.
Viper Lordpent (ヴァイパー・ロードペント, Vaipā Rōdopento)
Voiced by: Kengo Kawanishi (Japanese); Alejandro Saab (English)
Sylphid's sadistic, greedy and cunning half-brother, who is half nāga. He becomes a major obstacle after Uchimura's promotion to Supreme Tenno of the Demon Army drives him into improving its provisioning, only to find that the Trading Guild, which Viper took over, is stockpiling food supplies to sell them on the black market at his own prices. Uchimura, however, outwits him by supplying the public markets with an alternative food source, thus forcing the merchants dealing with Viper out of their expected revenues. This, in addition to Uchimura's revelation of his brutal abuse of his aide Neia, and Neia's father sabotaging Viper's supply line in return for his daughter's safety, drives them into electing a new head for the Guild, and Viper is arrested for his underhanded dealings. However, soon after he is slain in his cell by Vahn during his mission to kidnap his sister Ulmandra for Buzzan after Viper's shady business practices incurred the usurper emperor's displeasure.

=== Kingdoms and Demihuman Tribes ===
Vahn
The first prince of Kuryū, Mandra's son and Ulmandra's brother. A supremely skilled martial artist, he reluctantly became Buzzan's right hand after the usurper took his mother hostage. He later kidnaps his sister from the Demon King nation under Buzzan's command, but manipulates Uchimura into coming to his aid for his plan to free his family and depose Buzzan. Expecting to die in his attempt, he is saved by Uchimura, and after Buzzan's defeat assumes the throne.
Mandra
The elderly former emperor of Kuryū, a firm friend and ally of the Demon King, and Ulmandra and Vahn's father. He was poisoned by Buzzan, one of his servants, and forced into exile in the capital's slums, while Vahn became Buzzan's right hand and Ulmandra fled to the nation of the Demon King.
Yue
Ulmandra and Vahn's mother and Mandra's wife. A still youthful and rather tumultuous person, she was placed under house arrest by Buzzan and takes a very familial liking to Uchimura after her liberation.
Buzzan
The usurper emperor of Kuryū. A greedy, twisted and sadistic despot who lives solely for his own pleasure, he does not care about the nation and its people. He has the special ability to perceive and control sound, thus making him keenly aware of everything going on around him. He has Ulmandra kidnapped and intends to wed her in order to take revenge on the privileged Kuryū nobles, especially the imperial family. During the ceremony, he is attacked by Uchimura and Vahn. After Uchimura survives a dive into a mana-destroying poison which does not affect him due to his innate nonmagical nature, and which was used by Buzzan as his favorite method of execution, Buzzan, foolishly believing that they have switched the poison with a fake, shatters the vessel containing it, thus dousing himself with the substance and depowering himself in the process. After Vahn ascends to the throne, Buzzan is banished for his crimes.
Rampage King (ランページ王, Ranpēji-ō)
Voiced by: Mitsuki Saiga (Japanese); Van Barr Jr. (English)
The ruler of the Land of Gold, a wealthy nation neighboring the Demon King's domain whose main revenue lies in its rich gold mines. Despite his youth and generosity, he is infamous for his extremely volatile temper, which makes the death penalty his standard verdict for anyone who angers him. Uchimura is sent to Rampage's court by the Demon King to open commerce between the two nations and successfully concludes a trade agreement for magic-imbued Rosemarin Stones to defend his realm from incursions by violent magical beasts.
Talius (タリウス, Tariusu)
Voiced by: Takaya Kuroda (Japanese); Reagan Murdock (English)
The chief of the minotaur tribes. At first ready to enter an alliance with the Demon King, his willingness began to fall apart when the quarters offered to him did not meet his requirements and his inability to communicate his desires resulted in a misunderstanding. However, after Uchimura realized and corrected the problem, the negotiations were successfully concluded.
Ogre (オグレ, Ogure)
Voiced by: Tetsuo Komura (Japanese); Alex Hom (English)
The chief of the ogre tribes, whose bravery and strength, in addition to the might of his army, makes him a serious competitor to the Demon King. However, his stubborn refusal to maintain important alliances and his declining health – and refusal to step down – were driving the ogre tribes and their allies into ruin. Uchimura exploits this by recruiting the other humanoid tribes for the Demon Army, causing Ogre to set his pride aside and thus agree to join the Demon King as well.
The Holy King
The emperor of Starfrost, a neutral but militant nation, and a former companion of the Demon King. His nation has been studying the Calamities to predict their risings and devise ways of combatting them after these creatures begin appearing at an alarming frequency following Uchimura's arrival. After Uchimura and Umlmandra help in destroying one of the Calamities which attacked Kuryū, the Holy King personally approaches them to form an alliance with the Demon Kingdom against these monsters.
Kuc Kwatrokhis
The Holy King's female bodyguard and chief negotiator. Though very clumsy and shy (and as such, unsuited for a negotiator role), she is a strong fighter with her poleaxe.
Madd Meimalon
A male demihuman citizen of the realm of Sylvania, and the military minister of its western part, Autavia.
Klōs
A young happy-to-go cat demihuman, and a selfproclaimed wandering helper of the needy from the eastern part of Sylvania, called Old Sylvania. He and Geim rescue Uchimura from an avalanche shortly after the latter's troupe's arrival in Sylvania to forge an alliance against the rising Calamities.
Geim
A cat demihuman woman and Klōs' companion. While dour, she is more perceptive about her region's economic imbalance than Klōs.
Glara
A mouse demihuman and Klōs' love interest. She and her younger sister Gliri run an inn and general store in the mining town of Azack in Old Sylvania. When their store runs into financial difficulties due to the population's sagging interest in its commodity merchandise, Uchimura helps revitalizing their commerce.

=== Others ===
Calamities (災害, Saigai)
The collective term for a number of gargantuan monsters lying dormant in various isolated spots in the other world. When one awakens and goes on a rampage, its appearance constitutes a national crisis. Only very powerful individuals, like the Demon King, can fight such a monster toe to toe without the help of special weaponry. Their numbers include:
- Georgios, in the form of a giant toad with stony skin;
- Hydor, a giant nine-headed sea hydra;
- Prometheus, the lord of the wyverns who attacked the Demon Kingdom and was destroyed by the Demon King;
- Anemos, a Cthulhu-esque creature who attacked the realm of Kuryū
Izakaya Propietor (居酒屋の大将, Izakaya no Taisho)
Voiced by: Naoya Nosaka
An anime-only character, this elderly man is the owner of a small fish restaurant named Izakaya in Japan, which appears to be Uchimura's favorite hangout for relaxation before his transition to the Demon King's world. Once in the service of his new employer, Uchimura likes to think back to this place when contemplating a difficult problem, and at the end of each anime episode the owner is seen dispensing bits of his personal wisdom.

== Media ==
=== Manga ===
Written by Benigashira and illustrated by Muramitsu, Headhunted to Another World: From Salaryman to Big Four! began serialization on Overlap's Comic Gardo manga website on December 27, 2019. Its chapters have been collected into thirteen tankōbon volumes as of July 2026. The series is licensed in English by Seven Seas Entertainment.

No.	Original release date	Original ISBN	North American release date	North American ISBN
1	June 25, 2020	978-4-86554-686-6	October 5, 2021	978-1-64827-602-6
1. "Headhunting 101: Snatch up Potential Hires Right After They're Teleported to Their New World!"; 2. "The Right Mentality for Starting a New Job in a New World"; 3. "How Did He Capture the Heart of That Minotaur?"; 4. "Why Losing Your Temper Means Losing the Client"; 5. "Getting It Through the Head Honcho's Thick Skull"; 6. "What to Do When You're Attacked By a Giant Wild Boar?"; 7. "Magical Bear Recipes Made Easy! The Perfect Lunch for a Busy Day"; 8. "Two Worlds, Two Entirely Different Cultures"; 9. "Starting Off By Settling Goals"; Bonus: "Back to School! The "Big Four" Salary Academy!"
2	December 25, 2020	978-4-86554-813-6	December 14, 2021	978-1-64827-630-9
10. "For Your Next Talk"; 11. "Keeping Track of the Magic Budget"; 12. "Live for Your Own Self-Interest"; 13. "Project Manager Job Interests"; 14. "Emergency! Emergency!"; 15. "Putting the Pieces in Order"; 16. "Less Is More"; 17. "What It Takes to be a Top-Level Merchant"; 18. "Compassion"; 19. "The Bigger Picture"; Bonus: "Multi-Dimension Bathing Culture"
3	June 25, 2021	978-4-86554-948-5	May 24, 2022	978-1-63858-187-1
20. "Make a Lasting Impression"; 21. "Getting a Bead on the Situation"; 22. "Working Out the Kinks"; 23. "Sword and Shield"; 24. "The Calm Before the Storm"; 25. "Turning Point"; 26. "Can I Sleep On It?"; 27. "A Battle Without a Hero"; 28. "All-Out War"; 29. "Hope and Despair"; Bonus: "Behind the Scenes!"
4	January 25, 2022	978-4-8240-0096-5	January 17, 2023	978-1-63858-713-2
30. "The Climax of the Calamity War"; 31. "Living Without Goals"; 32. "Finding a Purpose in Life"; 33. "The Great Negotiator"; 34. "Sibling Rivalry"; 35. "A Young Slave"; 36. "The Demon Army's Blade"; 37. "Trump Cards and Double Crossing"; 38. "A Slave's Venom"; 39. "On the Conservative Side"; Bonus: "Ulmandra's Secret"
5	June 25, 2022	978-4-8240-0220-4	September 19, 2023	978-1-68579-552-8
40. "The After-Party"; 41. "Obstacles and Trump Cards"; 42. "Sore Loser"; 43. "Cleanup and Preparations"; 44. "Nothing's Ever Easy"; 45. "The Mark of Strength"; 46. "A Negotiation at Its Core"; 47. "Departing with the Kingdom's Finest"; 48. "The Danger of the River Dragon"; Bonus: "A Secretary's Attire"
6	December 25, 2022	978-4-8240-0370-6	May 21, 2024	979-8-88843-471-0
49. "Kuryuu"; 50. "Naked Negotiations"; 51. "An Encounter"; 52. "Those Who Have Fallen"; 53. "New Information"; 54. "The Emperor's Punishment"; 55. "Bought Out for a Meeting"; 56. "The Taken and the Takers"; 57. "Arrogance Is Bliss"; 58. "Wedding Crashers"
7	July 25, 2023	978-4-8240-0568-7	November 26, 2024	979-8-89160-180-2
59. "The Second Blade"; 60. "Two Sides of One Coin"; 61. "The Emperor Has No Clothes"; 62. "The Blazing Emperor"; 63. "A Single Bolt of Lightning"; 64. "Broadband"; 65. "An Armor of Wreckage"; 66. "The Iron Hammer of Justice"; 67. "Explosive Problem-Solving"; 68. "Spear Toss of Hope"
8	January 25, 2024	978-4-8240-0721-6	April 22, 2025	979-8-89160-927-3
69. "Recovery and Cleansing"; 70. "Goodbyes and a New Threat"; 71. "Forewarning of a Calamity"; 72. "The Neutral Nation and Its Holy King"; 73. "A Snow-White Hellscape"; 74. "On the Border Back Home"; 75. "A Youth and a Close Call"; 76. "New Players, New Challenges"; 77. "Inventory and Gifts"; Intermission: "The Cleansing Ceremony (Ulmandra's Perspective)"
9	July 25, 2024	978-4-8240-0900-5	October 28, 2025	979-8-89373-629-8
78. "Family and Strategy"; 79. "East and West"; 80. "The Ice Queen"; 81. "Inspiration and Escape"; 82. "Added Value and Inviolability"; 83. "Hidden Things"; 84. "Secrets of West and East"; 85. "The King and the Boy"; 86. "The Resurrected Fallen Angel"
10	December 25, 2024	978-4-8240-1040-7	March 31, 2026	979-8-89561-573-7
87. "Icy Predation"; 88. "The Royal System"; 89. "Overdrive"; 90. "The King of Sylvania"; 91. "The Battle King"; 92. "The Queen's Memories"; 93. "Rex and Legion"; 94. "Victory and Reconciliation"; Side story: "Everyone's Respective Battles"
11	July 25, 2025	978-4-8240-1276-0	August 18, 2026	979-8-89765-912-8
95. "The Singing Ceremony"; 96. "Friendship and Farewell"; 97. "An Audience with Three Kings"; 98. "The Past Revealed"; 99. "Crossroads and an Incident"; 100. "Contaminated Waters"; 101. "Solutions Are Born from Experience"; 102. "Operation: Red Water Purification"; 103. "I Love You Demon Overlord-sama"
12	January 25, 2026	978-4-8240-1504-4	February 23, 2027	979-8-89863-935-8
13	July 20, 2026	978-4-8240-1756-7	—	—

=== Anime ===
An anime television series adaptation was announced during the fourth livestream for the "10th Anniversary Memorial Overlap Bunko All-Star Assemble Special" event on July 21, 2024. It is produced by Geek Toys and CompTown, and directed by Michio Fukuda, with Hiroko Fukuda handling series composition, Seung-Deok Kim serving as assistant director, Ayumi Nishibata designing the characters, and Takafumi Wada composing the music. The series aired from January 6 to March 24, 2025, on Tokyo MX and BS11. The opening theme song is "Isekai Kyōsōkyoku" (異世界協奏曲; Alternate World Concerto), performed by Kentarō Seino, while the ending theme song is "Tsuyo Girlfriend" (ツヨガールフレンド; Strong Girlfriend), performed by Otonari. Crunchyroll streams the series. Medialink licensed the series in South, Southeast Asia and Oceania (except Australia and New Zealand) for streaming on Ani-One Asia's YouTube channel.

==== Episodes ====
No.	Title	Directed by	Written by	Storyboarded by	Original release date
1	"Tips on How to Pass the Entrance Exam in Another World"; Transliteration: "Isekai Nyūsha Shiken ni Ukaru Kotsu" (Japanese: 異世界入社試験に受かるコツ)	Kim Seung-deok	Hiroko Fukuda	Michio Fukuda	January 6, 2025 (Note: Episode 1 is released on ABEMA, dAnime Store, Crunchyroll and Ani-One Asia 5 days before the televised airing.)
Uchimura is a regular office worker who did his best to find a job at a company and worked hard, but was constantly overlooked by his superiors. His managers even decided to transfer him overseas to a dead-end branch of the company where he didn't have a full staff, enough equipment to complete tasks, or even speak the local language. Despite all that, Uchimura worked hard, and soon the branch started to increase productivity. Just when his superiors decided to shunt him off to another dead-end branch, Uchimura is abruptly summoned by the Demon King of another world to work as one of his four generals. As his first task to prove that a human can be a part of the Demon King's army, Uchimura is tasked with negotiating with the leader of the Minotaurs, Lord Tarius, whose past negotiations with Big Four member Ulmandra had failed. Uchimura realizes that Tarius and Ulmandra were just miscommunicating with each other, and after a night of talking and learning some basic Minotaur culture, Uchimura is able to finalize the negotiations and have the Minotaurs join the Demon King's forces. The Demon King then presents Uchimura with a bracelet that signifies his acceptance as a member of the Big Four.
2	"The Art of Negotiation in Captivating a Stubborn Tribal Chief"; Transliteration: "Ishiatamana Zokuchō o Toriko ni suru Kōshō-Jutsu" (Japanese: 石頭な族長を虜にする交渉術)	Kiyoto Nakajima	Kan'ichi Katō	Tomoe Makino	January 13, 2025 (Note: From Episode 2 onwards, episodes are released on ABEMA, dAnime Store, Crunchyroll and Ani-One Asia a week before their televised airings.)
Still getting used to the new world he's been summoned to, Uchimura is sent by the Demon King to negotiate a merger with the Ogre tribes. Upon arriving to their meeting with the Ogre leader, Ohgrey, negotiations are put at a standstill when Ohgrey insults the Demon King in front of Ulmandra, but Uchimura is able to keep the peace and gain time to strategize. While deciding what to do next, Ohgrey's daughter Orl approaches them with a request to dethrone her father in order to help her people. She reveals that while the Ogres appear to have standing equal to the Demon King's forces, they are in fact destitute. Orl believes joining the demon army is the only way to save them, but her father refuses to do so, even though he himself is gravely ill and suffering. After returning to the Demon King's castle and a night of thinking, Uchimura comes up with a plan; he and Orl negotiate with the tribes that trade with the Ogre tribes and have them join the demon army in advance. With Orl confronting her father about their tribe's situation, Uchimura proposes that the Ogre's make an alliance with the demon army instead of merging, so that Ohgrey can keep his pride and the demon army still gains the Ogre soldiers. After few days, the alliance is secured, and Orl is sent to the Demon King's castle as an emissary and becomes Uchimura's official aide, much to Ulmandra's fury.
3	"Now I Understand! Elite General Communication"; Transliteration: "Kore de Wakatta! Shiten'nō Komyunikēshon" (Japanese: これでわかった！ 四天王コミュニケーション)	Yu Chenfeng & Luo Shuantian	Toshiaki Satō & CompTown	Hiroyuki Shimazu	January 20, 2025
Although pleased with his new job, Uchimura finds out that the Demon Army is still lacking in vital sectors, including provisions. While Ulmandra takes him to a foraging trip and brings down a giant boar, her preparation of its meat proves inadequate, and so Uchimura has to resort to his bachelor cooking techniques to make it palatable. He also gets to learn more about the differences between demons and demi-humans, but he accidentally offends Ulmandra over her light outfit. The resulting tantrum and a talk with the Demon Lord make him realize how much he still has to learn about this world's people. In the meantime, Ulmandra laments to Orl about Uchimara apparently not paying any romantic attention to her, and eventually both end up apologizing for not properly understanding each other. For his successful efforts in increasing his army, the Demon Lord awards Uchimura with a magic stone. Uchimura refuses to claim credit for just himself and offers the magic stone to Ulmandra, thereby unknowingly (and much to her flusterment) making a proposal to her.
4	"Breakthroughs Happen Even With Magic!"; Transliteration: "Mahō ni mo Bureikusurū o!" (Japanese: 魔法にも技術革新(ブレイクスルー)を！)	Lee Dong-ik	Shōgo Yasukawa	Jin Tamamura	January 27, 2025
The Demon King assigns Uchimura with studying the differences between demons and demi-humans, particularly on the topic of magic use, more closely, and taks him with consulting his fellow General Sylphid. The door to Sylphid's office is answered by her assistant Belinda, but Uchimura quickly figures out that she is Sylphid in disguise. She explains that she has been working on refined magical items using magical stones imbued with multiple spells, but these are too expensive to mass-produce. Uchimura therefore hits upon the idea of loading the stones with only one single spell, thus making them more cost-effective. After dragging Uchimura into an overnight shift, Sylphid synthesises such a stone, which she calls Rosemarines, just when a horde of flightless birds invades the Demon King's lands. Sylphid has Uchimura test the new stones on the birds, but they burn out quickly when used for high-power attacks. Consequently, Uchimura instead uses them to erect monster-repelling barriers, which use negligible power, with much more success. Sylphid also opens up a bit to Uchimura about herself, thereby improving their relationship.
5	"The Best Way to Enjoy a Stroll Through the Marketplace in Another World"; Transliteration: "Isekaiichi Tanoshī Ichiba no Arukikata" (Japanese: 異世界一楽しい市場の歩き方)	Masahiko Watanabe	Kan'ichi Katō	Michio Fukuda	February 3, 2025
On Rūya Day, a holiday, Uchimura visits the public market in the Demon King's capital to probe the local economy and devise ways to improve it, much to the chagrin of Ulmandra (who was hoping for a date). He notices that the prices for food have been vastly inflated and determines that the wholesaler distributing the farmers' produce to the sellers must be driving the prices up for their own profit. Then two desperate bakers approach him about helping them sell a traditional confectionery named chimozu, whose popularity has been declining over time, imperiling their business. Using the holiday's background story and adapting the chimozu to a new customer base, Uchimura revitalizes the bakers' sales. During his probing, he has also learned of an unscrupulous merchant named Butagarian and a wealthy neighboring nation called the Land of Gold, and suggests to the Demon King to expand commerce by opening a trade agreement with that nation. The Demon King agrees by offering the Rosemarin Stones for trade, since it's gifted personnel who keep advancements alive, not the already-made advancements themselves.
6	"The Art of Managing People"; Transliteration: "Hito o Ugokasu Kanri-Jutsu" (Japanese: 人を動かす管理術)	Kim Myung-geun	Toshiaki Satō	Kōichi Ōhata	February 10, 2025
Uchimura travels to the Land of Gold and receives an audience with the Rampage King. After getting a first-hand impression of the King's touchy temper, Uchimura offers him the Rosemarin Stones for trade, and upon using it to ward of the King's pet giant crocodile, the King accepts. However, he gives the Demon Kingdom one week to deliver them at nearly impossible quotas. To meet these demands, Uchimura pushes his organisation skills to the limit, only to learn later that the Rampage King has suddenly cancelled his order because he's getting the same stones at a vastly reduced price from local merchant Butagarian. This affects trade revenues and morale in the Demon Kingdom, plunging him into a guilt ride about his supposed failure. After a rebuke by the Demon King for giving up so soon, he is "invited" by Ulmandra to a dinner date, only to have the intended romantic mood spoiled by Orle. Nevertheless, their confidence in him restores Uchimura's spirit, and he resolves to investigate and resolve the matter.
7	"Conditions to Become a First-Class Merchant"; Transliteration: "Ichiryū no Shonin no Jōken" (Japanese: 一流の商人の条件)	Lee Dong-ik	Toshiaki Satō	Kōichi Ōhata	February 17, 2025
After some analysis, Uchimura figures out that the Rosemarin Stones sold to the Land of Gold by another party have been stolen from the Demon Kingdom villages who originally received them to protect their crops. Staking out an as yet unaffected settlement, he catches the thieves in the act, but lets them get away, for he has set another trap for their client by planting dummy stones. When Bugatarian next visits the Rampage King, he is arrested and tried for his subterfuge, with Uchimura as a material witness. The Rampage King sentences Butagarian to death, but Uchimura pleads clemency, pointing out that Butagarian is a well-connected merchant who is able to procure rare supplies from nations who otherwise forbid trade with their neighbors, including the Land of Gold. The Rampage King pardons Butagarian, and Uchimura reveals that he's also learned that the merchant has a large family of adopted children, war orphans he has taken in, and grants him permission to trade Rosemarin Stones legally. Ashamed and grateful, Bugatarian in turn discloses to Uchimura that something sinister is stirring in the Demon Kingdom's trading guild.
8	"Bring Down the Scalpel of Justice to the Corrupt Organization!"; Transliteration: "Fuhai Soshiki ni Seigi no Mesu o!" (Japanese: 腐敗組織に正義のメスを！)	Xie Liheng & Luo Shuantian	Shōgo Yasukawa	Hiroshi Hōri	February 24, 2025
With the prices for vital goods still rising to unaffordable levels, Uchimura decides to meet with Viper Lordpent, master of the trading guild, to probe the situation. Sylphid accompanies him, and as they meet with Viper, Uchimura is surprised to learn that they are siblings, with Viper being half naga due to the elves' racial difficulties in procreating among their own kind. Sylphid discloses that her relatives are utterly corrupt and greedy, which is the reason she severed ties with her clan. As they consider their next step, they are approached by a young elf girl named Neia, who claims that she was Lordpent's slave and ran away to seek help from Uchimura. She reveals that Viper has been spreading false rumors to drive up prices and stockpiling grain to sell it in small amounts for maximum profit. Acting on this information, Uchimura calls for an emergency audit at the guild, but finds no evidence for Viper's underhanded practices. It is later revealed that Neia was planted with Uchimura as a mole in order to mislead him, with her parents held hostage by Viper to ensure her cooperation. As Uchimura ponders what to do, Ulmandra returns from a mission of her own regarding a mass incursion of wyverns, which sparks an idea in him.
9	"The Sins and Punishments of an Evil Merchant"; Transliteration: "Akutoku Shōnin no Tsumi to Batsu" (Japanese: 悪徳商人の罪と罰)	Kim Myung-geun	Shōgo Yasukawa	Takuya Satō	March 3, 2025
Uchiumura discloses to the other Four Generals how he wants to use smoked wyvern meat to solve the food shortage problem, but Sylphid stops him from telling more. When Neia tries to find more hints, Sylphid catches her in the act, forcing Neia to escape and report back to Viper. To outmaneuver Uchimura, Viper plans to ship the grain the guild has hoarded to the Demon Kingdom's markets; but back at the Demon King's castle, Uchimura tells Sylphid that he knows Neia is a spy for Viper under duress and begins to implement a change to his plans. The next morning, Viper is startled to learn that the Demon Army has started handing out grain rations. Sylphid confronts her half-brother, explaining that the Demon Army has obtained the grain with the help of Uchimura's newly forged contacts in return for the wyvern meat, thus destroying Viper's hopes for profit; and after Uchimura and Neia have revealed Viper's ruthlessness to the other merchants, Viper is deposed as guild master and arrested. Uchimura adopts Neia into his team, after having made a deal with her father in return for him delaying Viper's grain shipment. But right after these happy news, a huge swarm of wyverns are invading the Demon Kingdom.
10	"Sword and Shield"; Transliteration: "Sōdo Ando Shīrudo" (Japanese: 剣と盾(ソード&シールド))	Lee Ki-sub	Kan'ichi Katō	Kōichi Ōhata	March 10, 2025
Uchimura, his assistants and Ulmandra travel to the Demon Fort, a border fortress currently in the path of the invading wyverns. Uchimura quickly notices that there are tensions between the fractions the Demon Army is composed of: The magic-using demons and the nonmagical demihumans. After analyzing the situation, Uchimura disbands the mixed units composed of members of both fractions to increase their overall efficiency in combat, enabling them to repel the wyvern incursions more easily. He also improves the Army's logistics, but discerns that the attacks on the fortress are too coordinated. Right then, news reach him that the wyverns have suddenly started attacking two other border fortresses. Ulmandra tries to beat them back, but is severely injured in the attempt.
11	"A Battle Without Heroes"; Transliteration: "Eiyū no Inai Tatakai" (Japanese: 英雄のいない戦い)	Chen Fengyu & Xie Liheng	Hiroko Fukuda	Ryōji Fujiwara	March 17, 2025
In his worry over the wyvern attacks, and his aides out in the field to supervise the defense, Uchimura nearly works himself to exhaustion until a rebuke by the Demon King makes him realize his folly. With his head cleared by a night's sleep, he determines that the wyverns are primarily attacking to snatch women, especially demons, and devises a plan to use them as bait. Under this strategy, the next wyvern raid is successfully thwarted; but then it is revealed that the monsters were merely food gatherers for another, gargantuan monster called a Calamity. But just as the Calamity rises and attacks, the Demon King arrives and kills the creature, ending the wyvern incursions.
12	"How to Find Your Way of Life"; Transliteration: "Jinsei no Mi Mitsuke Kata" (Japanese: 人生の見つけ方)	Mamoru Enomoto	Hiroko Fukuda	Tomoe Makino	March 24, 2025
After the Calamity is vanquished, the Demon King rewards his loyal Generals. In a subsequent private meeting, the Demon King announces that he intends to make Uchimura his successor for ruling the kingdom he is striving to create. Uchimura reacts with utter horror, thinking himself unfit for such a role because he is still restrained by the trauma inflicted on his self-esteem in his previous life on Earth. After being given time to think it over, Uchimura decides to return to his old life as a simple salaryman; but as he looks back to what he has achieved, and hears from the other Generals how much he has inspired them, he changes his mind and stays to face this new responsibility and its challenges.

== Reception ==
By July 2025, the series had over 600,000 copies in circulation.
