= Apparently, Disillusioned Adventurers Will Save the World =

Japanese light novel series

- First light novel volume cover

人間不信の冒険者たちが世界を救うようです (Ningen Fushin no Bōkensha-tachi ga Sekai o Sukuu Yō Desu)
- Genre: Fantasy
- Novel series
- Written by: Shinta Fuji
- Published by: Shōsetsuka ni Narō
- Original run: January 2019 – present
- Light novel
- Written by: Shinta Fuji
- Illustrated by: Susumu Kuroi
- Published by: Media Factory
- English publisher: NA: Yen Press
- Imprint: MF Books
- Original run: September 25, 2019 – November 25, 2023
- Volumes: 6
- Manga
- Written by: Shinta Fuji
- Illustrated by: Masaki Kawakami
- Published by: Kadokawa Shoten
- English publisher: NA: Yen Press
- Magazine: ComicWalker
- Original run: October 25, 2019 – January 23, 2023
- Volumes: 6
- Anime television series

Ningen Fushin: Adventurers Who Don't Believe in Humanity Will Save the World
- Directed by: Itsuki Imazaki
- Written by: Itsuki Imazaki
- Music by: Ryo Takahashi
- Studio: Geek Toys (Note: Animation production assistance (アニメーション制作協力) for all episodes provided by Seven.)
- Licensed by: Crunchyroll (streaming); SA/SEA: Muse Communication
- Original network: Tokyo MX, BS11, KBS Kyoto, SUN
- English network: US: Crunchyroll Channel
- Original run: January 10, 2023 – March 28, 2023
- Episodes: 12
- icon

Apparently, Disillusioned Adventurers Will Save the World (人間不信の冒険者たちが世界を救うようです, Ningen Fushin no Bōkensha-tachi ga Sekai o Sukuu Yō Desu; lit. 'Adventurers Who Lost Faith in People Will Apparently Save the World') is a Japanese light novel series written by Shinta Fuji and illustrated by Susumu Kuroi. It began serialization online in January 2019 on the user-generated novel publishing website Shōsetsuka ni Narō. It was later acquired by Media Factory, who have published six volumes from September 2019 to November 2023 under their MF Books imprint. A manga adaptation with art by Masaki Kawakami was serialized online via Kadokawa Shoten's ComicWalker website from October 2019 to January 2023. It was collected in six tankōbon volumes. An anime television series adaptation produced by Geek Toys aired from January to March 2023.

== Synopsis ==
Veteran adventurer Nick works his hardest to progress his party to full rank as his ultimate dream. He is, however, unceremoniously expelled from the party due to disapproval, phony romance, and embezzlement. The directionless Nick spends his funds on merchandise and becomes an idol otaku to make ends meet. As luck would have it, three depressed individuals sat down at his table together drinking as a means of coping, when they all divulged their utter stories. Each of the four has one common thread: betrayal. Nick, mage Tiana, cleric Zem, and half-dragon Curran agree to form an unbreakable team to save humanity from corruption.

== Characters ==
Nick (ニック, Nikku)
Voiced by: Yūsuke Kobayashi (Japanese); Kieran Flitton (English)
The party's leader and thief. He was expelled from his former party after an argument over his teammates' embezzling of funds, after which his scammer girlfriend dumped him, and he wasted all his money on idols. However, upon meeting Tiana, Curran, and Zem and bonding over their shared betrayals, he proposes that they form a new party to fund their spendthrift lifestyles, all while working to overcome their issues; in his case, his tendency to talk down to others.
Tiana (ティアーナ, Tiāna)
Voiced by: Sayumi Watabe (Japanese); Christina Kelly (English)
A former noblewoman and the party's magic caster. She was an exceptional student at a prestigious academy until her spiteful fiancé ended their engagement, and she was subsequently stripped of her status after being falsely accused of bribery. After losing all of her money in gambling, she took up a life of adventuring, but her fierce appearance made it difficult to join a party until she met Nick, Curran, and Zem.
Curran (カラン, Karan)
Voiced by: Sayaka Kikuchi (Japanese); Brittney Karbowski (English)
A dragonkin and the party's warrior. She was robbed and left for dead in a dungeon by her former party, causing her to have severe trust issues. Miraculously surviving, she is determined to recover a one-of-a-kind heirloom that her ex-teammates stole from her and joins Nick, Tiana, and Zem for this purpose, whilst working to overcome her primary vice: her lack of education. Aside from being a glutton, she is the only party member without a bad spending habit, convincing her new teammates to entrust her with storing their shared funds.
Zem (ゼム, Zemu)
Voiced by: Shun'ichi Toki (Japanese); Landon McDonald (English)
A former priest and the party's healer. He lived as an aspiring worshiper of God until he rejected an underage girl's romance. She then falsely accused him of assaulting her out of revenge, which led to his revocation and banishment from the Church. After this, he spent all of his money on alcohol to drink away his sorrows, resulting in him becoming an addict. A kindhearted innkeeper later took him in and suggested he become an adventurer, which he did, where he met Nick, Curran, and Tiana.
Kizuna (キズナ)
Voiced by: Mikako Komatsu (Japanese); Philip Weber (English)
The Holy Sword of Bonds. It has the power to fuse two trusted entities into a stronger single figure. It takes on the form of a young man who becomes a companion of The Survivors.
Agate (アゲート, Agēto)
Voiced by: Kaori Ishihara (Japanese); Kelsey Maher (English)
A singing idol who Nick befriended and sees her as a role model. He collects merchandise based on her idol group for his hobby.

== Media ==
=== Light novels ===
The series written by Shinta Fuji began serialization in the user-generated novel publishing site Shōsetsuka ni Narō in January 2019. It was later acquired by Media Factory, who publishing it with illustrations by Susumu Kuroi under their MF Books imprint. The series released six volumes from September 25, 2019, to November 25, 2023.

At Sakura-Con 2022, Yen Press announced that they licensed the series for English publication.

No.	Original release date	Original ISBN	English release date	English ISBN
1	September 25, 2019	978-4-04-064062-4	October 18, 2022	978-1-9753-4998-1
2	March 25, 2020	978-4-04-064536-0	February 21, 2023	978-1-9753-5186-1
3	August 25, 2021	978-4-04-680696-3	June 20, 2023	978-1-9753-5188-5
4	December 23, 2022	978-4-04-682020-4	April 16, 2024	978-1-9753-7689-5
5	March 24, 2023	978-4-04-682320-5	September 17, 2024	978-1-9753-9122-5
6	November 25, 2023	978-4-04-683072-2	April 8, 2025	979-8-8554-0851-5

=== Manga ===
A manga adaptation with art by Masaki Kawakami was serialized on Kadokawa Shoten's ComicWalker website from October 25, 2019, to January 23, 2023.

At Anime Expo 2022, Yen Press announced that they licensed the manga for English publication.

No.	Original release date	Original ISBN	English release date	English ISBN
1	March 23, 2020	978-4-04-064478-3	January 17, 2023	978-1-9753-5192-2
2	August 21, 2020	978-4-04-064826-2	June 20, 2023	978-1-9753-5194-6
3	January 22, 2021	978-4-04-680099-2	September 19, 2023	978-1-9753-5196-0
4	September 21, 2021	978-4-04-680639-0	January 23, 2024	978-1-9753-5199-1
5	April 22, 2022	978-4-04-681232-2	May 21, 2024	978-1-9753-6741-1
6	January 23, 2023	978-4-04-682065-5	August 20, 2024	978-1-9753-9012-9

=== Anime ===
An anime adaptation was announced at the MF Books 8th Anniversary livestream event on August 15, 2021. It was later revealed to be a television series produced by Frontier Works, animated by Geek Toys in cooperation with Seven, and written and directed by Itsuki Imazaki, who also storyboarded all the episodes. Hiroo Nagao handled the character designs and served as chief animation director, and Ryo Takahashi composed the music. The series aired from January 10 to March 28, 2023, on Tokyo MX and other networks. The opening theme song is "Glorious World" by Shun'ichi Toki, while the ending theme song is "Never Fear" by Mao Abe. Crunchyroll streamed the series under the title, Ningen Fushin: Adventurers Who Don't Believe in Humanity Will Save the World, and is streaming it along with an English dub. Muse Communication also licensed the series in Asia-Pacific and streamed it on Muse Asia YouTube channel.

No.	Title	Directed by	Written by	Original release date (Note: Episodes are released on select platforms a week before their air dates on television.)
1	"Disillusioned Adventurers"; Transliteration: "Ningen Fushin no Bōkensha-tachi" (Japanese: 人間不信の冒険者たち)	Ryūichi Baba	Makoto Takada, Itsuki Imazaki	January 10, 2023
In Labyrinth City, adventurer Nick is abruptly kicked from his team by his mentor, Argus, followed by his girlfriend, Claudine, dumping him. Disillusioned, Nick develops an otaku lifestyle around teen idol Agate. To fund this lifestyle, Nick returns to adventuring, but requires a new team. By chance at an inn, he shares a table with sorceress Tiana, ex-priest Zem, and Dragon-girl Curran, all of them disillusioned over something. Tiana is a magical prodigy jilted by her jealous fiancé, causing her to become a gambling addict and fail to become an adventurer because her glaring eyes scare away potential teammates. Zem used to be a Healer Priest until he rejected the advances of a young village girl. Angered, she accused him of rape, leading to his expulsion from the priesthood. He decided to become an adventurer, but, freed from his vow of chastity, has become a drunken womaniser. Curran merely explains that someone she trusted stole something from her. The four drink together over their shared inability to trust people. Nick realizes that they will remain disillusioned unless they do something about it and suggests that they form a team together.
2	"The Ultimate Party Is Formed? Survivors!"; Transliteration: "Saikyō Pāti Kessei? Sabaibāzu!" (Japanese: 最強パーティ結成？サバイバーズ！)	Hisanori Kobayashi	Atsushi Oka, Itsuki Imazaki	January 17, 2023
At the guild, Nick learns that Curran is famous for being the sole survivor of a team that attempted a C rank Labyrinth, where the other members died. Nick decides to name their new team the Survivors. As each team member has trust issues they set up rules that make it impossible to access team wages unless all four agree. As a new team, they start at the G-rank and must defeat two G-rank labyrinths to be promoted. Tiana accidentally shoots a spell at Curran, damaging their already fragile trust and causing resentment. They reach the dungeon boss, a giant Slime, which Tiana recklessly kills alone, covering everyone in slime and increasing Curran's resentment. As a teambuilding exercise, Nick asks everyone to reveal their strengths and weaknesses; Tiana apologizes to Curran by revealing that she is weak against fire and close combat, at which Curran excels, restoring some trust. In the next dungeon, they face an intelligent, magic resistant ogre and Curran is able to trust Tiana to protect her while she kills the ogre. Everyone begins to feel closer, until Nick accidentally causes Curran to drop and smash an important charm from her bag.
3	"Curran's Secret"; Transliteration: "Karan no Himitsu" (Japanese: カランの秘密)	Han Younghoon	Ryōsuke Kobayashi, Itsuki Imazaki	January 24, 2023
In the past, Curran served the human who she believed would become the hero, Kalios. Curran was swindled by a merchant, but Kalios exposed the crime and forced him to give Curran the necklace, which she treasured. Kalios eventually betrayed her and stole her Dragon King Gem, a jewel sacred to the Dragon-kin that she was tasked to keep safe for her whole life. After failing to track Kalios, she gave up until she encountered Fifth, an adventurer so strong that he had permission to enter labyrinths alone. He was also a notorious food enthusiast and even though they only spoke once, he inspired Curran, causing her to return to adventuring. In the present, Nick attempts to buy a new necklace to apologize, but Agate, a friend of Nick's from before her idol career, suggests that he simply continue to be Curran's friend. Curran, who truly is not upset about the necklace, is just happy that her life is better than before. The four party members realize that they are becoming popular at the guild and celebrate. The guild abruptly hires them to explore a dungeon rumored to contain the Holy Sword of Bonds.
4	"The Labyrinth of Bonds"; Transliteration: "Kizuna no Meikyū" (Japanese: 絆の迷宮)	Kim Eunbyeong	Makoto Takada, Itsuki Imazaki	January 31, 2023
They enter the Labyrinth of Bonds and locate the sword, which possesses intelligence and explains that he can only be wielded by people with strong bonds of friendship. Sword is disappointed that they plan to sell him. Removing Sword activates a golem made of liquid Nano machines that cannot be damaged. Nick manages to activate Sword's blade, yet Sword is confused that Nick's friendship bonds aren't strong enough to activate him fully. Nick falls to a lower floor and Curran rescues him. Curran explains to Nick that she kept the necklace to remind her of Kalios, but it kept her stuck in the past so Nick breaking it helped her move on. Their reconciliation fully activates Sword, fusing them into one body. With their combined power, the golem is destroyed. They give Sword to the guild for the bounty, only to reveal that it was a weaker copy from a nearby storeroom and Sword, now calling himself Bond, has joined their team as an androgynous young man. Bond is disappointed that their team's bylaws prevent them from interfering with each other's hobbies, so they always split up to celebrate on payday. Tiana invites Bond to accompany her since he doesn't have his own hobby yet.
5	"A Meeting with the Iron Tigers."; Transliteration: "Tekkotai, Aimamieru." (Japanese: 鉄虎隊、相まみえる。)	Ryūichi Baba	Ryōsuke Kobayashi, Itsuki Imazaki	February 7, 2023
The Survivors all dream of the lives they had before. In particular, Tiana dreams of her academy instructor, whose career she accidentally ruined through her own ambition, and Nick dreams of his ex, Claudine. Their dreams turn out to be unintentionally caused by Kizuna's telepathy. While monster hunting, Kizuna reveals that he contains the sword skills of all of his past wielders. While at a restaurant with Curran and Kizuna, Nick spots Claudine, a known con artist, trying to take a young man's money using the same con that she once used on Nick. Claudine leaves after Nick exposes her. Claudine later provokes a fight between Nick and her party leader Leon, the leader of the Iron Tigers. However, in private, Leon reveals to Nick that he will soon dump Claudine as she has made him rich, but her cons draw too much attention. He also congratulates Nick on forming the Survivors party, as he assumes that Nick is conning them for their money. Nick beats him up for even suggesting that he would betray his first real friends. The Guild Leader breaks them up as a street brawl is beneath career adventurers. Instead, Leon challenges Nick to the traditional Mathematics Bare Knuckle Battle.
6	"Mathematics Bare Knuckle"; Transliteration: "Sansū Beanakkuru" (Japanese: 算数ベアナックル)	Akio Hosoya	Atsushi Oka, Itsuki Imazaki	February 14, 2023
It is explained that Bare Knuckle Mathematics involves ten rounds of brawling. Nick and Leon fight while Curran and Claudine solve maths questions to end each round. Whoever gets the most questions correct earns their fighter a free punch to their opponent. Curran panics as she is bad at math. Zem learns that the Iron Tigers plan to cheat by using their party member, Beg. During round one and two, Curran loses to Claudine, so Nick is punched twice. The other Survivors cannot locate Beg anywhere. Curran loses the third round, so Nick is punched again. The survivors suspect that Beg is waiting for the later rounds. To force him to appear, Tiana suggests that they answer all of the questions in one go, even though if Curran loses, Nick would be punched seven times. Guildmaster Vilma agrees, so Claudine uses telepathy crystals to get the correct answers from Beg. Beg is caught by the Survivors, who also expose Claudine's telepathy crystal. The Iron Tigers are arrested and Claudine cries, revealing that she never wanted to be a criminal and hates what she has become. Curran is happy that she learned math because she can now identify bargains on restaurant menus.
7	"Gambling Lesson"; Transliteration: "Tobaku Shinan" (Japanese: 賭博指南)	Ryūichi Baba	Makoto Takada, Itsuki Imazaki	February 21, 2023
Leon is interrogated about a treasure that he looted from a labyrinth years ago, the Sword of Ruinous Evolution. Elsewhere Tiana, Nick, and Kizuna enjoy themselves at a casino, which is attacked by Leon looking for Nick, having used the sword to escape and evolve into a monster. Leon, whose sense of smell can now detect lies, threatens Tiana for Nick's location. Tiana is amused by Leon's assumption that she and Nick are friends. Leon's nose tells him that Tiana has no faith that Nick will save her, so he decides to just kill her. However, Nick does save her with Kizuna in his Sword of Bond form, surprising Tiana. Evolution evolves Leon further and takes control of his body, rampaging wildly while Leon begs him to stop. Tiana and Nick prove their real friendship by using Bond's full power to fuse into one body. Leon, despite his hate of humans, refuses to believe that he is truly an evil person and allows Tiana/Nick to coat him in the casino's anti-magic playing cards, returning him to normal. Evolution is sealed away and Leon returns to prison, content that he is not evil at heart, especially when Nick reveals that he avoided killing anyone even with Evolution controlling him.
8	"The Beautiful Paladin"; Transliteration: "Uruwashi no Paradin-sama" (Japanese: 麗しのパラディンさま)	Kim Eunbyeong	Ryōsuke Kobayashi, Itsuki Imazaki	February 28, 2023
Agate meets Nick and is impressed at how far he has come, but Nick is worried about her as she has recently cancelled all of her concerts and public appearances. Agate narrates that her real name is Bell Haggins and she was once a singer at her boyfriend, Donny's, failing bar until a music producer discovered her talent and made her an idol. She fell in love with the lifestyle, but began to feel unsatisfied with Donny, especially when he began borrowing her idol wages for gambling, claiming that it was to save the bar. Then one day, at a casino, she saw Tianna easily win all of Donny's money before helping Nick defeat the evolved Leon, causing Agate to idolize Tianna as her Paladin. Back in the present, Agate breaks up with Donny and begins hosting concerts again, crediting her return to her Paladin, who Nick realizes was himself and Tianna using Kizuna's power. Agate meets with Nick again, confident that they will both keep moving forward.
9	"The Legend of the Labyrinth City - Stepping Man?!"; Transliteration: "Meikyū Toshi Densetsu Suteppingu Man!?" (Japanese: 迷宮都市伝説 ステッピングマン！？)	Han Younghoon	Atsushi Oka, Itsuki Imazaki	March 7, 2023
Thanks to the adventurer/amateur journalist, Olivia Taylor, Kizuna becomes obsessed with Stepping Man, a monster that can leap over rooftops and kidnaps children. Later Zem, Kizuna, and Nick stop Stepping Man from kidnapping a girl named Reina. With proof that Stepping Man is actually a human using invisibility magic, the Survivors decide to catch him. They confirm that Stepping Man has a bounty for his capture, but the Mercenary Guild insists that they capture a smaller bounty first, Hale Hardy, a suspected murderer. The mercenary Ash, angry at adventurers taking mercenary work, enters a wager with Tiana on the success of them capturing Hale. They track Hale to the slums, where Zem, as a healer, is disturbed by the living conditions of many people who are sick, drug addicted, and dying. After capturing Hale, the Survivors are confronted by Dr Nalgava, another ex-priest who has been treating Hale for Yellow Demon Sickness. When asked about Stepping Man, Hale reveals that he has seen Olivia in the slums talking to children. The Survivors cannot ignore Olivia's suspicious behaviour and confront her about being Stepping Man. Olivia flees by jumping into the air straight through the buildings roof, just like Stepping Man.
10	"Labyrinth Dragnet"; Transliteration: "Meikyū Sōsamō" (Japanese: 迷宮捜査網)	Ryūichi Baba	Makoto Takada, Itsuki Imazaki	March 14, 2023
Reina's mother, retired adventurer Ada the Sommelier, is grateful that the Survivors saved her. Reina asks to become Zem's disciple, but he refuses, revealing that his past experience gave him a phobia of young girls. Ada decides to train the Survivors against Stepping Man's skills; Light Body for flight and Heavy Body for strength. After encountering Stepping Man again, Nick also doubts that it is Olivia. Suspecting that Stepping Man is using a magic artifact, Nick asks for Leon's advice and learns that the most likely artifact is an Illusion King Gem. Its illusions are easily broken by confronting the user by name, meaning that Olivia is definitely not Stepping Man. Olivia later attacks them, believing that Nick is Stepping Man. After determining that neither of them are Stepping Man, Olivia admits that Stepping Man was her adventurer title before she became a reporter, meaning Stepping Man is using her title and skills to frame her. Examining a dead girl, one of Stepping Man's victims, they find an Illusion Gem fragment designed to obscure her identity. With the fragment removed, she is revealed as Martha, a blacksmith's daughter who was receiving treatment for Yellow Demon Sickness. Zem believes that he knows who Stepping Man is.
11	"Survivors VS Stepping Man"; Transliteration: "Sabaibāzu Bāsasu Suteppingu Man" (Japanese: サバイバーズVSステッピングマン)	Kim Eunbyeong	Ryōsuke Kobayashi, Itsuki Imazaki	March 21, 2023
The Survivors confront Stepping Man and break his illusions with his name, Dr. Nalgava. His obsession with curing Yellow Demon Sickness began when his own daughter died of it. The sickness is usually sexually transmitted, so after she died, Nalgava went mad with the rumours of how his daughter became infected. By experimenting on kidnapped children, Nalgava has proven that it can also be transmitted from contact with infected blood. Zem confronts him with the pain that he caused his victims' parents, but Nalgava is unrepentant. An armoured warrior named White-Mask suddenly tries to kill Nalgava and the Survivors to keep the truth hidden. Curran and Tiana are hurt, so Olivia distracts White-Mask, identifying his armour as a similar relic to Kizuna. Nick and Zem combine using Kizuna's Bond ability and manage to stab White-Mask in the face. Amused that they actually hurt him, White-Mask spares their lives and disappears. Injured by falling rubble and also infected with Yellow Demon Sickness, Nalgava opts to die when the building collapses. Since White-Mask uses a relic and undoubtedly has a powerful master controlling him, Olivia reveals to the Survivors that she is also a weapon relic like Kizuna, the Anti-Demon-God Sword of War.
12	"Adventurers Can't Save the World Yet!"; Transliteration: "Bōkensha wa Mada Sekai o Sukuenai" (Japanese: 冒険者はまだ世界を救えない)	Itsuki Imazaki	Atsushi Oka, Itsuki Imazaki	March 28, 2023
After defeating Stepping Man, the Survivors all enter a state of depression. Nick remembers meeting Argus, who saved him from the bandit that murdered his parents. Zem takes over Nalgava's clinic in the slums. Tianna returns to gambling, but no longer enjoys it. When the Survivors meet, there is uncertainty over what to do next. Curran begins brooding over Kalios and wonders if she should forget about him and move on. Olivia uncovers evidence that the Dark Demon God will soon return, with White-Mask somehow involved. She is also investigating the black market that sold Nalgava the Illusion King Gem. Curran takes an interest in the market as it may be where Kalios sold her Dragon King Gem. The Survivors promise if she ever wants to find her Gem, they will help. Suddenly inspired, the Survivors decide to uncover the conspiracy, expose White-Mask, and stop the Dark Demon God's return. Curran gains an admirer, a Cat-girl who she earlier saved from the same swindling merchant who Kalios once saved her from. Kizuna and Olivia, both immortal artifacts who will long outlive the Survivors, agree that the Survivors have potential to defeat the Dark Demon God, but still have a long way to go.

== See also ==
- There's a Demon Lord on the Floor, another manga series illustrated by Masaki Kawakami
