= List of Date A Live episodes =

Cover of the first DVD/Blu-ray volume of Date A Live as released by Kadokawa Shoten on June 28, 2013.

Date A Live is an anime series adapted from the light novels of the same title written by Kōshi Tachibana and illustrated by Tsunako. The first season was produced by Anime International Company and directed by Keitaro Motonaga, covering volumes 1 to 4 of the light novel. It was broadcast on Tokyo MX from April 6 to June 22, 2013. The second season was produced by Production IMS, which ran from April 12 to June 14, 2014, covering volumes 5 to 7 of the light novel. The third season was produced by J.C.Staff, which ran from January 11 to March 29, 2019, covering volumes 8 to 12 of the light novel. The fourth season produced by Geek Toys was set to premiere in October 2021, but was delayed to 2022 for "various reasons", which ran from April 8 to June 24, 2022, covering volumes 13 to 16 of the light novel. A fifth season, also produced by Geek Toys, ran from April 10 to June 26, 2024, covering volumes 17 to 19 of the light novel.

The series has been licensed by Funimation for streaming and home video release in North America and by Madman Entertainment in Australia. Following Sony's acquisition of Crunchyroll, the series was moved from Funimation to Crunchyroll.

== Series overview ==
Season	Episodes	Originally released	
Season	Episodes	First released	Last released
1	12	April 6, 2013	June 22, 2013
2	10	April 12, 2014	June 14, 2014
3	12	January 11, 2019	March 29, 2019
4	12	April 8, 2022	June 24, 2022
5	12	April 10, 2024	June 26, 2024

== Episodes ==
=== Season 1 (2013) ===
No. overall	No. in season	Title (Note: All English titles are taken from Funimation.)	Ending theme	Original release date	Ref.
1	1	"April 10"; Transliteration: "Shigatsu Tōka" (Japanese: 四月十日)	"Hatsukoi Winding Road"	April 6, 2013	
2	2	"Close Re-encounter"; Transliteration: "Sai-sekkin Sōgū" (Japanese: 再接近遭遇)	"Save The World"	April 13, 2013	
3	3	"Sword That Splits the Sky"; Transliteration: "Sora Wakatsu Tsurugi" (Japanese: 空分かつ剣(つるぎ))	"Save My Heart"	April 20, 2013	
4	4	"Unhappy Rain"; Transliteration: "Fukigen na Ame" (Japanese: 不機嫌な雨)	"Save The World"	April 27, 2013	
5	5	"The Freezing Ground"; Transliteration: "Itetsuku Daichi" (Japanese: 凍て付く大地)	"Strawberry Rain"	May 4, 2013	
6	6	"Hot Springs of Love"; Transliteration: "Koisuru Onsen" (Japanese: 恋する温泉)	"Save The World"	May 11, 2013	
7	7	"The Visitors"; Transliteration: "Raihōsha-tachi" (Japanese: 来訪者達)	"Save My Heart"	May 18, 2013	
8	8	"Triple Frenzy"; Transliteration: "Sanjū Kyōsō Kyoku" (Japanese: 三重狂騒曲)	"Save The World"	May 25, 2013	
9	9	"Raging Nightmare"; Transliteration: "Kyōran no Akumu" (Japanese: 狂乱の悪夢)	"Save My Heart"	June 1, 2013	
10	10	"Spirit Of Fire (Ifrit)"; Transliteration: "Honō no Seirei (Ifurīto)" (Japanese: 炎の精霊(イフリート))	"Save The World"	June 8, 2013	
11	11	"Countdown"; Transliteration: "Kauntodaun" (Japanese: カウントダウン)	"Save My Heart"	June 15, 2013	
12	12	"Things You Can't Give Up"; Transliteration: "Yuzurenai Mono" (Japanese: 譲れないもの)	"Save The World"	June 22, 2013	

=== Season 2 (2014) ===
No. overall	No. in season	Title	Original release date	Ref.
13	1	"Daily Life"; Transliteration: "Deirī Raifu" (Japanese: デイリー・ライフ)	April 12, 2014	
14	2	"Children of the Storm"; Transliteration: "Gufū no miko" (Japanese: 颶風の御子)	April 19, 2014	
15	3	"Two Wishes"; Transliteration: "Futatsu no negai" (Japanese: ふたつの願い)	April 26, 2014	
16	4	"Manifestation"; Transliteration: "Kengen" (Japanese: 顕現)	May 3, 2014	
17	5	"Diva"; Transliteration: "Dīva" (Japanese: ディーヴァ)	May 10, 2014	
18	6	"Girls Music"; Transliteration: "Gāruzu Myūjikku" (Japanese: ガールズ・ミュージック)	May 17, 2014	
19	7	"The Army-Destroying Songstress (Gabriel)"; Transliteration: "Hagun Utahime (Gaburieru)" (Japanese: 破軍歌姫(ガブリエル))	May 24, 2014	
20	8	"The Promise to Keep"; Transliteration: "Hatasubeki Yakusoku" (Japanese: 果たすべき約束)	May 31, 2014	
21	9	"The Truth About Miku"; Transliteration: "Miku no Shinjitsu" (Japanese: 美九の真実)	June 7, 2014	
22	10	"Inversion"; Transliteration: "Hanten" (Japanese: 反転)	June 14, 2014	

=== Season 3 (2019) ===
No. overall	No. in season	Title	Original release date	Ref.
23	1	"The Seventh Spirit"; Transliteration: "Nana ban-me no Seirei" (Japanese: 七番目の精霊)	January 11, 2019	
24	2	"Can You Find Me?"; Transliteration: "Watashi o mitsukerareru?" (Japanese: 私を見つけられる?)	January 18, 2019	
25	3	"You're Natsumi"; Transliteration: "Natsumi wa omae da" (Japanese: 七罪はおまえだ)	January 25, 2019	
26	4	"Transformation"; Transliteration: "Henshin" (Japanese: 変身)	February 1, 2019	
27	5	"Despair Comes Crashing Down"; Transliteration: "Zetubō ga ochitekuru" (Japanese: 絶望が落ちてくる)	February 8, 2019	
28	6	"Crossroads"; Transliteration: "Wakatareta michi" (Japanese: 分かたれた道)	February 15, 2019	
29	7	"The Power Given"; Transliteration: "Motarasareta chikara" (Japanese: もたらされた力)	February 22, 2019	
30	8	"Demon King of Descending Darkness"; Transliteration: "Yami furu yoru no maō" (Japanese: 闇降る夜の魔王)	March 1, 2019	
31	9	"Tengu City, Five Years Ago"; Transliteration: "Gonenmae, Tengū-shi" (Japanese: 五年前、天宮市)	March 8, 2019	
32	10	"Another World, Another Girl"; Transliteration: "Mōhitotsu no sekai, mōhitori no kanojo" (Japanese: もうひとつの世界、もうひとりの彼女)	March 15, 2019	
33	11	"Angel of the Starry Night"; Transliteration: "Hoshi furu yoru no Tenshi" (Japanese: 星降る夜の天使)	March 22, 2019	
34	12	"Make Shido Itsuka Swoon"; Transliteration: "Itsuka Shidō o kōryaku seyo" (Japanese: 五河士道を攻略せよ)	March 29, 2019	

=== Season 4 (2022) ===
No. overall	No. in season	Title (Note: All English titles are taken from Crunchyroll.)	Directed by (Note: Information is taken from the ending credits of each episode.)	Written by	Storyboarded by	Original release date	Ref.
35	1	"Don't Panic. This is a Spirit Trap"; Transliteration: "Awateru na. Kore wa Seirei no Wana da" (Japanese: あわてるな。これは精霊の罠だ)	Norihiko Nagahama	Fumihiko Shimo	Ikuo Morimoto	April 8, 2022	
36	2	"So Be It! 2D It Is!"; Transliteration: "Yoroshii, Naraba Nijigen da" (Japanese: よろしい、ならば二次元だ)	Yukio Kuroda	Fumihiko Shimo	Kenichi Yatagai	April 15, 2022	
37	3	"What's Yours Is Mine"; Transliteration: "Kimi no Mono wa Watashi no Mono" (Japanese: 君のものは私のもの)	Seung Deok Kim; Taiki Nishimura	Fumihiko Shimo	Ikuo Morimoto	April 22, 2022	
38	4	"Space Spirit"; Transliteration: "Sora no Seirei" (Japanese: 宙(そら)の精霊)	Kōichirō Kuroda; Ryūta Imaizumi	Fumihiko Shimo	Kōji Hōri	April 29, 2022	
39	5	"Fairy Tale"; Transliteration: "Fearī Teiru" (Japanese: フェアリー・テイル)	Masahiko Watanabe	Fumihiko Shimo	Ikuo Morimoto	May 6, 2022	
40	6	"An Opened Heart"; Transliteration: "Hirakareta Kokoro" (Japanese: 開かれた心)	Shunji Yoshida	Fumihiko Shimo	Tetsuhito Saitō	May 13, 2022	
41	7	"Locked Memories"; Transliteration: "Tojirareta Kioku" (Japanese: 閉じられた記憶)	Taiki Nishimura; Jirō Arimoto	Fumihiko Shimo	Kenichi Yatagai	May 20, 2022	
42	8	"Key and Sword"; Transliteration: "Kagi to Ken" (Japanese: 鍵と剣)	Jirō Arimoto	Fumihiko Shimo	Ippei Ichii	May 27, 2022	
43	9	"Nightmare's Seduction"; Transliteration: "Muma no Yūwaku" (Japanese: 夢魔の誘惑)	Yukio Kuroda	Fumihiko Shimo	Takashi Sano	June 3, 2022	
44	10	"Girl Time"; Transliteration: "Otome no Jikan" (Japanese: 乙女の時間)	Masahiko Watanabe	Fumihiko Shimo	Ken'ichi Imaizumi	June 10, 2022	
45	11	"Past Sins"; Transliteration: "Kajitsu no Zaigō" (Japanese: 過日の罪業)	Yūsuke Onoda	Fumihiko Shimo	Hiroyuki Kōbe	June 17, 2022	
46	12	"Cycle of Salvation"; Transliteration: "Kyūsai no Rinne" (Japanese: 救済の輪廻)	Shōgo Hanagami	Fumihiko Shimo	Ikuo Morimoto	June 24, 2022	

=== Season 5 (2024) ===
No. overall	No. in season	Title	Directed by	Written by	Storyboarded by	Original release date	Ref.
47	1	"Beginnings of War"; Transliteration: "Kaisen no Noroshi" (Japanese: 開戦の狼煙)	Jirō Arimoto	Fumihiko Shimo	Yasuto Nishikata	April 10, 2024	
48	2	"Final Respite"; Transliteration: "Saigo no Kyūsoku" (Japanese: 最後の休息)	Masahiko Watanabe	Fumihiko Shimo	Hiroshi Matsuzono	April 17, 2024	
49	3	"The Spirit's Resurrection"; Transliteration: "Seirei no Fukkatsu" (Japanese: 精霊の復活)	Jun Nakagawa	Fumihiko Shimo	Takashi Sano	April 24, 2024	
50	4	"The Spirit of Origin"; Transliteration: "Shigen no Seirei" (Japanese: 始原の精霊)	Shōgo Hanagami	Fumihiko Shimo	Ikuo Morimoto	May 1, 2024	
51	5	"Mother Mio"; Transliteration: "Hahanaru Mio" (Japanese: 母なる零)	Jirō Arimoto	Fumihiko Shimo	Ippei Ichii	May 8, 2024	
52	6	"The Three Magi"; Transliteration: "San'nin no Majutsu-shi" (Japanese: 三人の魔術師)	Shōgo Hanagami	Fumihiko Shimo	Kōichi Chigira, Kōji Iwai	May 15, 2024	
53	7	"The World Tree Sheds Leaves"; Transliteration: "Seikaiju wa Rakuyō shi" (Japanese: 世界樹は落葉し)	Norihiko Nagahama	Fumihiko Shimo	Kōji Iwai	May 22, 2024	
54	8	"The One Who Pulled the Trigger"; Transliteration: "Hikigane ni Yubi o Kaketa no wa" (Japanese: 引き金に指を掛けたのは)	Jirō Arimoto	Fumihiko Shimo	Yasuto Nishikata	May 29, 2024	
55	9	"A "Second" Date"; Transliteration: "“Futatabime” no Dēto" (Japanese: 『二度目』のデート)	Masahiko Watanabe	Fumihiko Shimo	Tetsuhito Saitō	June 5, 2024	
56	10	"A Battlefield That Should Be Impossible"; Transliteration: "Arienai Hazu no Senjō" (Japanese: あり得ないはずの戦場)	Shōgo Hanagami	Fumihiko Shimo	Hiroshi Matsuzono	June 12, 2024	
57	11	"A Fleeting Paradise"; Transliteration: "Kari Hajime no Rakuen" (Japanese: 仮初めの楽園)	Jun Nakagawa	Fumihiko Shimo	Takashi Sano	June 19, 2024	
58	12	"And Her Choice Is"; Transliteration: "Soshite Kanojo ga Erabu no wa" (Japanese: そして彼女が選ぶのは)	Jirō Arimoto	Fumihiko Shimo	Yasuto Nishikata, Jun Nakagawa	June 26, 2024	

== OVAs ==
No.	Title	Original release date	Ref.
1	"DATE TO DATE"	December 6, 2013	
While Tohka experiments with the new cellphone she got from Kotori, Origami approaches Shido and demands a date with him. Unable to refuse, Shido is assisted by the Fraxinus crew to ensure that their date becomes a total failure. All his attempts to ditch her are futile. Meanwhile, while shopping for dinner, Tohka calls Shido at his phone which is his earphone connection and believing his words of rejection are to her, she falls into despair and her powers go haywire. Shido runs after her to clear the misunderstanding and accidentally left his cellphone on, leading Origami to believe she'll be with him forever, making her happy at the end of her date. Sometime later, Shido has a date in the arcade with Tohka and when he asks to take a picture with her, she refuses and enters the photo cabin by herself instead. She gives him a picture of hers that she claims is for his eyes only. Back at the school, the other students accidentally see the picture, which turns out to be a photo of a naked Tohka. The only photo she ever took was during a medical examination and believed Shido wanted a similar one, much to his chagrin.
2	"Kurumi Star Festival / Encore"; Transliteration: "Kurumi Sutā Fesuteibaru" (Japanese: 狂三スターフェステイバル)	December 9, 2014	
Set on the 7th of July, the day of the Tanabata Festival. As Shido is waiting to cross the street, he sees Kurumi on the other side. After crossing, he is surprised by Kurumi who then asks him on a date all of a sudden. Shido thinks of rejecting her invitation but is curious about her acting out of character, adding on with her fake crying, he eventually agrees to do so. After looking at many delicious foods being sold at the festival, Kurumi brings Shido to the Planetarium. At first, Shido doesn't intend to bother about it but it seems that his point of view on Kurumi begins to change; he thinks that she is really acting like a normal girl but still feels doubtful because he hasn't figured out her true intentions. While watching a presentation in the Planetarium, they have a conversation about the Legend of Orihime and Hikoboshi. Kurumi then tells Shido that she wants to write a tanzaku, believing her written wish will be granted. The truth is, Shido's real purpose of going out was to go shopping and prepare for dinner, but doesn't have the opportunity to get away from Kurumi as he finds himself unable to leave her side. As they are walking, Kurumi sees an advertisement for a free wedding and told him that she wants to have good memories with him and vice versa. Although reluctant at first, Shido understands and tells her that they have to ask first and if they won't be allowed, she has to forget about it. Kurumi coerces the attendant by claiming she was terminally ill allowing herself and Shido to participate. They are given a photo as a memento and then move on. As the evening arrives, Kurumi and Shido both write their tanzaku and then go to find a place to hang them. Shido is then shocked as the real Kurumi arrives, having been hunting down the version of herself that Shido had been spending the day with, who is the Kurumi he had swayed on top of the school last month that had survived Kurumi's attempt to kill her. After pulling the other self into her shadow, Kurumi leaves just as Kotori, Tohka and Yoshino arrive. Shido reads the tanzaku and runs to a rooftop to hang it at the highest point on the tree as it is believed that doing so makes the wish more likely to come true. Tohka catches him when he falls and they all return home. The tanzaku is then shown to say "I wish to spend another day with you." At home, Shido prepares dinner for the girls while the photo of him and Kurumi sits on his desk.
