= List of Hensuki volumes =

Hensuki, short for Hensuki: Are You Willing to Fall in Love with a Pervert, as Long as She's a Cutie? is a Japanese romantic comedy light novel series written by Tomo Hanama, and illustrated by sune. The series follows Keiki Kiryū, a high school student who seeks the identity of the sender of an unnamed love letter attached to an underwear, which consequently leads him to discover the special hidden peculiarities of the girls in his life. Media Factory published fourteen volumes of the series under their MF Bunko J imprint from January 25, 2017, to January 25, 2022.

A manga series adaptation illustrated by CHuN was serialized in Fujimi Shobo's Monthly Dragon Age magazine from November 9, 2017, to December 9, 2020. Six tankōbon volumes have been released. A spin-off manga titled Hensuki: Are You Willing to Fall in Love with a Pervert, as Long as She's a Cutie? Abnormal Harem was illustrated by kanbe and Hanamoto. Hakusensha published its first and only volume on April 24, 2020, under their Young Animal Comics imprint.

== Volume list ==
=== Light novel ===
No.	Release date	ISBN
1	January 25, 2017	978-4-04-069008-7
Prologue; Chapter 1: "Cinderella Dropped Her Panties" (シンデレラはパンツを落ちていきました, Shinderera wa Pantsu wo Ochite-ikimashita); Chapter 2: "My Senior Can't Be This Abnormal" (俺の先輩がこんなにアブノーマルなわけがない, Ore no Senpai ga Konna ni Abunōmaru na Wake ga nai); Chapter 3: "Since When Was I Under the Illusion That This Would Be a Normal Love Comedy?" (いつからこれが普通ラブコメだと錯覚していた？, Itsu kara kore ga Futsū Rabukome dato Sakkaku-shiteita); Chapter 4: "My Senior and Junior Are Fighting Way Too Much" (俺の先輩と後輩が修羅場すぎる, Ore no Senpai to Kōhai ga Shuraba-sugiru); Chapter 5: "A Cruel Truth's Thesis" (残酷な真実のテーゼ, Zankoku na Shinjitsu no Tēze); Epilogue
2	May 25, 2017	978-4-04-069279-1
Prologue; Chapter 1: "Is the Order a Bunny Girl?" (ご注文はバニーガールですか？, Gochūmon wa Banīgāru desuka?); Chapter 2: "My Hentai Love-Comedy Is Wrong as I Expected" (やはり俺の変態ラブコメはまちがっている, Yahari Ore no Hentai Rabukome wa machigatte-iru); Chapter 3: "Love, Stalkers and Other Delusions" (ストーカーでも恋がしたい！, Sutōkā demo Koi ga Shitai!); Chapter 4: "A Little Sister’s All You Need" (妹さえいればいいよね, Imouto sae Ireba ii yone); Chapter 5: "I Am a Master" (吾輩はご主人様である, Wagahai wa Goshujin-sama de aru); Epilogue
3	September 25, 2017	978-4-04-069457-3
Prologue; Chapter 1: "No Panties No Life" (ノーパンツ・ノーライフ, Nōpantsu Nōraifu); Chapter 2: "Yuika-Sama Wants to Be the Only One" (ゆいか様は尽くされたい, Yuika-sama wa Tsukusaretai); Chapter 3: "This Love is Being Turned into BL Manga" (その恋はＢＬ漫画化されていく, Sono koi wa BL Mangaka-sareteiku); Chapter 4: "Is the Order a Cat-Eared Maid?" (ご注文は猫耳メイドですか？, Gochuumon wa Nekomimi Meido desuka?); Chapter 5: "A Blessing to These Wonderful Swimsuits! (この素晴らしい水着回に祝福を！, Kono Subarashii Mizugikai ni Shukufuku wo!); Epilogue
4	January 25, 2018	978-4-04-069672-0
Prologue; Chapter 1: "And Like That, the Older Brother Decided To Run Away" (こうして兄は家出をすることにした, Koushite Ani wa Iede wo suru koto ni shita); Chapter 2: "He’s My Brother but It Doesn’t Matter if There’s Love, Right?" (兄さんだけど愛さえあれば関係ないよねっ, Ani-san dakedo Ai sae Areba Kankei nai yone~); Chapter 3: "The Surprise Attack Comes After the Fireworks" (不意打ちは花火のあとで, Fui-uchi wa Hanabi no ato de); Chapter 4: "Ayano-san Won’t Give Up" (あやのさん＠あきらめない, Ayano-san @ Akiramenai); Chapter 5: "A Certain Calligraphy Club’s Seaside Training Camp" (とある書道部の臨海合宿, Toaru Shodō-bu no Rinkai Gasshuku); Epilogue
5	March 25, 2018	978-4-04-069915-8
Prologue; Chapter 1: "I Still Don’t Know the Size of the Breasts I Saw That Day" (その日に見た胸の大きさはまだわかりません, Sonohi ni Mita Mune no Ōki-sa wa Mada Wakarimasen); Chapter 2: "Starting the Training Life From Zero" (ゼロからトレーニングライフを始める, Zero Kara Torēninguraifu o Hajimeru); Chapter 3: "The Event Book of the Legal Loli Senpai" (リーガルロリ先輩のイベントブック, Rīgarurori Senpai no Ibento Bukku); Chapter 4: "The Cat, the Panties, and the Sports Festival" (猫、パンティー、そしてスポーツフェスティバル, Neko, Pantī, Soshite Supōtsufesutibaru); Chapter 5: "How to Create an Interesting Shoujo Manga" (面白い少女マンガの作り方, Omoshiroi Shōjo Manga no Tsukurikata); Epilogue
6	October 25, 2018	978-4-04-065236-8
Prologue; Chapter 1: "This Calligraphy Club Has a Problem" (この書道クラブに問題があります, Kono Shodōkurabu ni Mondai ga Arimasu); Chapter 2: "That’s Why She Can't Part-Time Work" (だから彼女はアルバイトができないのです, Dakara Kanojo wa Arubaito ga Dekinai Nodesu); Chapter 3: "The Working Female Molester and Loving Pervert" (働く女性痴漢と愛情のある変態, Hatarakujosei Chikan to Aijō no aru Hentai); Chapter 4: "Teasing Master Mitani-san" (からかい上手の三谷さん, Karakai Jōzu no Mitani-san); Chapter 5: "This Passing World is Full of Perverts" (この通過する世界は変態でいっぱいです, Kono Tsūka Suru Sekai wa Hentai de Ippaidesu); Epilogue
7	February 25, 2019	978-4-04-065528-4
Prologue; Chapter 1: "A Sleepover Comes Sudden" (突然の寝坊, Totsuzen no Nebō); Chapter 2: "It’s the Culture Festival, Everyone!" (みなさん、文化祭です！, Minasan, Bunkamatsuridesu!); Chapter 3: "It’s the Culture Festival, You Perverts!" (それは文化祭です、あなたは変態です！, Sore wa Bunkamatsuridesu, Anata wa Hentaidesu!); Chapter 4: "Even So, I Won’t Do It" (それでも、私はそれをしません, Soredemo, Watashi wa Sore o Shimasen); Chapter 5: "For Airi, the Unknown Men’s World" (アイリにとって、未知の男性の世界, Airi ni Totte, Michi no Dansei no Sekai); Epilogue
8	July 25, 2019	978-4-04-065855-1; ISBN 978-4-04-065856-8 (SP)
Prologue; Chapter 1: "I’d Like To Borrow a Boyfriend" (彼氏を借りたい, Kareshi o Karitai); Chapter 2: "One of Them is the Perpetrator!" (それらの1つは加害者です！, Sorera no 1tsu wa Kagai-shadesu!); Chapter 3: "There is Always But One Truth" (常に1つの真実があります, Tsuneni 1tsu no Shinjitsu ga Arimasu); Chapter 4: "Excuse Me, But My Younger Boyfriend is Totally Interested in Real Grade School Girls" (すみませんが、私の若い彼氏は本当の小学生の女の子に完全に興味があります, Sumimasen ga, Watashi no Wakai Kareshi wa Hontō no Shōgakusei no On'nanoko ni Kanzen ni Kyōmigārimasu); Chapter 5: "That’s Why We Can't Love" (だから私たちは愛せない, Dakara Watashitachi wa Aisenai); Epilogue
9	December 25, 2019	978-4-04-064185-0
Prologue; Chapter 1: "Curry. After That, Panties." (カレー。 その後、パンティー。, Karē. Sonogo, Pantī.); Chapter 2: "Why Are You Here, Panties?!" (なんでここにいるんだ、パンティー？！, Nande Koko ni Irunda, Pantī?!); Chapter 3: "Why Are You Here, Heroine?!" (なんでここにいるんだ、ヒロイン？, Nande Koko ni Irunda, Hiroin?!); Chapter 4: "You are the Student Council Vice President, and I am Your Butler" (あなたは生徒会の副会長であり、私はあなたの執事です, Anata wa Seito-kai no fuku Kaichōdeari, Watashi wa Anata no Shitsujidesu); Chapter 5: "Love, Elections and a Broken Heart" (愛、選挙、失恋, Ai, Senkyo, Shitsuren); Epilogue
10	April 25, 2020	978-4-04-064586-5
Prologue; Chapter 1: "Is It Wrong to Want the Heroine’s Skirt?" (ヒロインのスカートが欲しいのは間違っていますか？, Hiroin no Sukāto ga Hoshī no wa Machigatte Imasu ka?); Chapter 2: "Scream Your Fetish at the Center of the World" (世界の中心であなたのフェチを叫ぶ, Sekai no Chūshin de Anata no Fechi o Sakebu); Chapter 3: "Not Knowing the Circumstances, the Classmate Approaches Relentlessly Still" (状況を知らず、同級生はまだ執拗に迫る, Jōkyō o Shirazu, Dōkyūsei wa Mada Shitsuyō ni Semaru); Chapter 4: "She’s Not a Pervert, But Apparently a Normal Heroine…" (彼女は変態ではありませんが、どうやら普通のヒロイン…, Kanojo wa Hentaide wa Arimasenga, Dōyara Futsū no Hiroin…); Chapter 5: "Yuika-chan Wants to Go On a Date!" (ゆいかちゃんはデートしたい！, Yuika-chan wa Dēto Shitai!); Epilogue
11	September 25, 2020	978-4-04-064943-6
Prologue; Chapter 1: "Handing a Girl a BL Book is a Simple Job" (女の子にBL本を渡すのは簡単な仕事です, On'nanoko ni BL hon o Watasu no wa Kantan'na Shigotodesu); Chapter 2: "The Kotatsu-Loving Tokihara-san" (こたつすきじ時原さん, Kotatsu-suki-ji Tokihara-san); Chapter 3: "Do You Like a Big Butt or a Small Butt?" (あなたは大きなお尻と小さなお尻のどちらが好きですか？, Anata wa Ōkina o Shiri to Chīsana o Shiri no Dochira ga Sukidesu ka?); Chapter 4: "The First Pervert" (最初の変態, Saisho no Hentai); Chapter 5: "A Certain Calligraphy Club’s Snowy Mountain Trip" (ある書道クラブの雪山旅行, Aru Shodōkurabu no Yukiyama Ryokō); Epilogue
12	January 25, 2021	978-4-04-680161-6
Prologue; Chapter 1: Yuika’s Revenge (ユイカの復讐, Yuika no Fukushū); Chapter 2: The Love in My Heart (私の心の中の愛, Watashi no Kokoronouchi no Ai); Chapter 3: How to Save the Heroine From Her Slump (ヒロインをスランプから救う方法, Hiroin o Suranpu Kara Sukuu Hōhō); Chapter 4: The Story of Wanting to Win Over a High School Boy During Valentine’s (バレンタインデーに高校生に勝ちたいという話, Barentaindē ni Kōkōsei ni Kachitai to Iu Hanashi); Chapter 5: The Perverts Fell in Love so They Went on a Double Date (変態は恋に落ちたので、彼らは二重のデートに行きました, Hentai wa Koi ni Ochitanode, Karera wa Nijū no Dēto ni Ikimashita); Epilogue
13	June 25, 2021	978-4-04-680511-9
14	January 25, 2022	978-4-04-681097-7

=== Manga ===
Hensuki: Are You Willing to Fall in Love with a Pervert, as Long as She's a Cutie?

No.	Release date	ISBN
1	May 25, 2018	978-4-04-072707-3
2	November 9, 2018	978-4-04-072949-7
3	July 25, 2019	978-4-04-073258-9
4	October 9, 2019	978-4-04-073362-3
5	April 25, 2020	978-4-04-073612-9
6	February 9, 2021	978-4-04-073983-0

Hensuki: Are You Willing to Fall in Love with a Pervert, as Long as She's a Cutie? Abnormal Harem

No.	Release date	ISBN
1	April 24, 2020	978-4-59-216159-2

== See also ==
- List of Hensuki episodes
