= There's a Demon Lord on the Floor =

Japanese manga series

- The cover of the first volume

フロアに魔王がいます (Furoa ni maō ga imasu)
- Genre: Comedy, supernatural
- Manga
- Written by: Hato
- Illustrated by: Masaki Kawakami
- Published by: Media Factory
- English publisher: NA: Seven Seas Entertainment
- Magazine: Monthly Comic Alive
- Original run: October 27, 2014 – July 23, 2019 (on hiatus)
- Volumes: 8

There's a Demon Lord on the Floor (Japanese: フロアに魔王がいます, Hepburn: Furoa ni maō ga imasu) is a Japanese manga series written by Hato and illustrated by Masaki Kawakami. It has been serialized in Media Factory's Monthly Comic Alive magazine since December 2014. The series is licensed and published in North America by Seven Seas Entertainment.

== Characters ==
Kouichi Iruma (入間光一, Iruma Kōichi)
Amon Patricia (アモン・パトリシア, Amon Patorishia)
Mutsu Igarashi (五十嵐むつ, Igarashi Mutsu)
Nonko (ノンコ)
Kisaragi (キサラギ)
Salut (サリュ, Saryu)

== Media ==
=== Manga ===
The original manga is serialized in Media Factory's Monthly Comic Alive magazine. The first chapter was published in the magazine's December 2014 issue. Kadokawa released the first tankōbon volume on September 19, 2015. Seven Seas Entertainment have licensed and released the volumes in English starting from February 2017.

No.	Original release date	Original ISBN	English release date	English ISBN
1	September 19, 2015	978-4040678078	February 28, 2017	978-1-626924-63-5
1. "There's a Demon Lord on the Floor"; 2. "There's a Suit of Armor on the Floor"; 3. "There's a Shy Girl on the Floor"; 4. "There's a Cat Lover on the Floor"; 5. "There's a Demon Lord at the Fest"; 6. "There's a Shrine Maiden on the Floor"
2	October 23, 2015	978-4040678252	May 9, 2017	978-1-626924-80-2
7. "There's a Kabe-Don on the Floor"; 8. "There's a Mushroom on the Floor"; 9. "There's a Birthday Boy on the Floor"; 10. "There's a Heat Wave on the Floor"; 11. "There's a Tomcat on the Floor"; 12. "There's a Spirit on the Floor"
3	March 23, 2016	978-4040682181	August 1, 2017	978-1-626925-21-2
13. "There's a Halloween Party on the Floor"; 14. "There's a Demon Sword on the Floor"; 15. "There's a Santa Claus on the Floor"; 16. "There's a Mochi on the Floor"; 17. "There's a Chocolate on the Floor"; 18. "There's a Camera on the Floor"
4	October 22, 2016	978-4040685632	November 28, 2017	978-1-626925-84-7
19. "There's a Ghost Server on the Floor"; 20. "There's an Album on the Floor"; 21. "There's a Dragon on the Floor"; 22. "There's a Pay-to-Win Game on the Floor"; 23. "There's a Giant Squid in the Sea"; 24. "There's a Diet on the Floor"
5	March 23, 2017	978-4040691213	March 27, 2018	978-1-626927-07-0
25. "There's a Love Fortune on the Floor"; 26. "There's a *bleep* on the Floor"; 27. "There's a Hero on the Floor"; 28. "There's a Hero (L) on the Floor"; 29. "There's a Scout on the Floor"; 30. "There's a Demon Lord and a Hero on the Floor"
6	February 23, 2018	978-4040697222	October 23, 2018	978-1-626928-30-5
31. "There's Exploitation on the Floor"; 32. "There's Photography on the Floor"; 33. "Prepare to Die on the Floor"; 34. "There's a Cavalry Battle at the Beach"; 35. "So This Is What You Eat"; 36. "There's a Bridal Crash Course on the Floor"; 37. "There's a Queen on the Floor"; 38. "There's a Fight on the Floor"; 39. "There's a Workout on the Floor"
7	September 21, 2018	978-4040651286	September 10, 2019	978-1-642756-94-4
40. "There's a Manual on the Floor"; 41. "There's a Doll on the Floor"; 42. "There's a Really Big Floor"; 43. "There's a Flame on the Floor"; 44. "There's a Typhoon beyond the Floor"
8	July 23, 2019	978-4040658018	October 13, 2020	978-1-645055-27-3
45. "There's a Pool Goddess on the Floor"; 46. "There's a Klutz on the Floor"; 47. "There's an Irresistible Force on the Floor"; 48. "There's a Doppelgänger on the Floor"; 49. "There's a Health Inspector on the Floor"; 50. "There's a Festival at the School"

== See also ==
- Apparently, Disillusioned Adventurers Will Save the World—A light novel series whose manga adaptation is illustrated by Masaki Kawakami.
