= Geek Toys =

Japanese animation studio

Geek Toys, Inc.
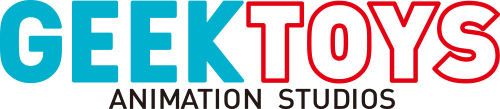
- Native name: 株式会社ギークトイズ
- Romanized name: Kabushiki-gaisha Gīku Toizu
- Company type: Kabushiki gaisha
- Industry: Japanese animation
- Founded: October 2017; 8 years ago
- Defunct: July 1, 2023; 2 years ago
- Fate: Merged with Geek Pictures
- Headquarters: 3-35-13 Yayoimachi, Nakano, Tokyo, Japan
- Number of locations: 2
- Key people: Tamotsu Kosano (president)
- Total equity: ¥ 10,000,000
- Number of employees: 35
- Parent: Geek Pictures, Inc.
- Website: geektoys.co.jp

Geek Toys, Inc. (Japanese: 株式会社ギークトイズ, Hepburn: Kabushiki-gaisha Gīku Toizu) was a Japanese animation studio based in Nakano, Tokyo.

== Establishment ==
The studio was founded in South Kōenji, Tokyo in October 2017 by Tamotsu Kosano, serving a subsidiary of Japanese mass media corporation Geek Pictures, before moving to Nakano, Tokyo in February 2020.

On July 3, 2023, Geek Toys announced that it had merged with its parent company, Geek Pictures on July 1 that same year, with Geek Pictures remaining as the surviving company, whilst also inheriting Geek Toys' business, rights and obligations.

=== Former representative staff ===
- Junichi Takagi (2017–2023, board member)

== Works ==
=== Television series ===
Title	Director(s)	First run start date	First run end date	Eps	Note(s)	Ref(s)
RErideD: Derrida, who leaps through time	Takuya Satō	October 3, 2018	December 19, 2018	12	Original work.	
Hensuki	Itsuki Imazaki	July 8, 2019	September 23, 2019	12	Adaptation of the light novel series by Tomo Hanama.	
Plunderer	Hiroyuki Kanbe	January 8, 2020	June 24, 2020	24	Adaptation of the manga series by Suu Minazuki.	
Fantasia Sango - Realm of Legends	Shunsuke Machitani	January 11, 2022	March 29, 2022	12	Adaptation of the Fantasia Sango video game series by UserJoy Technology.	
Date A Live IV	Jun Nakagawa	April 8, 2022	June 24, 2022	12	Sequel to Date A Live III. Fourth season of Date A Live.	
Ningen Fushin: Adventurers Who Don't Believe in Humanity Will Save the World	Itsuki Imazaki	January 10, 2023	March 28, 2023	12	Adaptation of the light novel series by Shinta Fuji.	
Dead Mount Death Play	Manabu Ono; Yoshihiro Satsuma	April 11, 2023	December 26, 2023	24	Adaptation of the manga series by Ryohgo Narita.	
Liar, Liar	Satoru Ono; Naoki Matsuura	July 8, 2023	September 23, 2023	12	Adaptation of the light novel series by Haruki Kuō.	
Migi & Dali	Mankyū	October 2, 2023	December 25, 2023	13	Adaptation of the manga series by Nami Sano. Co-animated with CompTown.	
Date A Live V	Jun Nakagawa	April 10, 2024	June 26, 2024	12	Sequel to Date A Live IV. Fifth season of Date A Live.	
Headhunted to Another World: From Salaryman to Big Four!	Michio Fukuda	January 6, 2025	March 24, 2025	12	Adaptation of the manga series by Benigashira and Muramitsu. Co-animated with CompTown.	

=== Films ===
Title	Director(s)	Release Date	Note(s)	Ref(s)
Date A Bullet: Dead or Bullet	Jun Nakagawa	August 14, 2020	Adaptation of the light novel series by Yuichiro Higashide and Kōshi Tachibana. Spin-off of Date A Live.	
Date A Bullet: Nightmare or Queen	Jun Nakagawa	November 13, 2020	Sequel to Date A Bullet: Dead or Bullet.	
