= Seichi junrei =

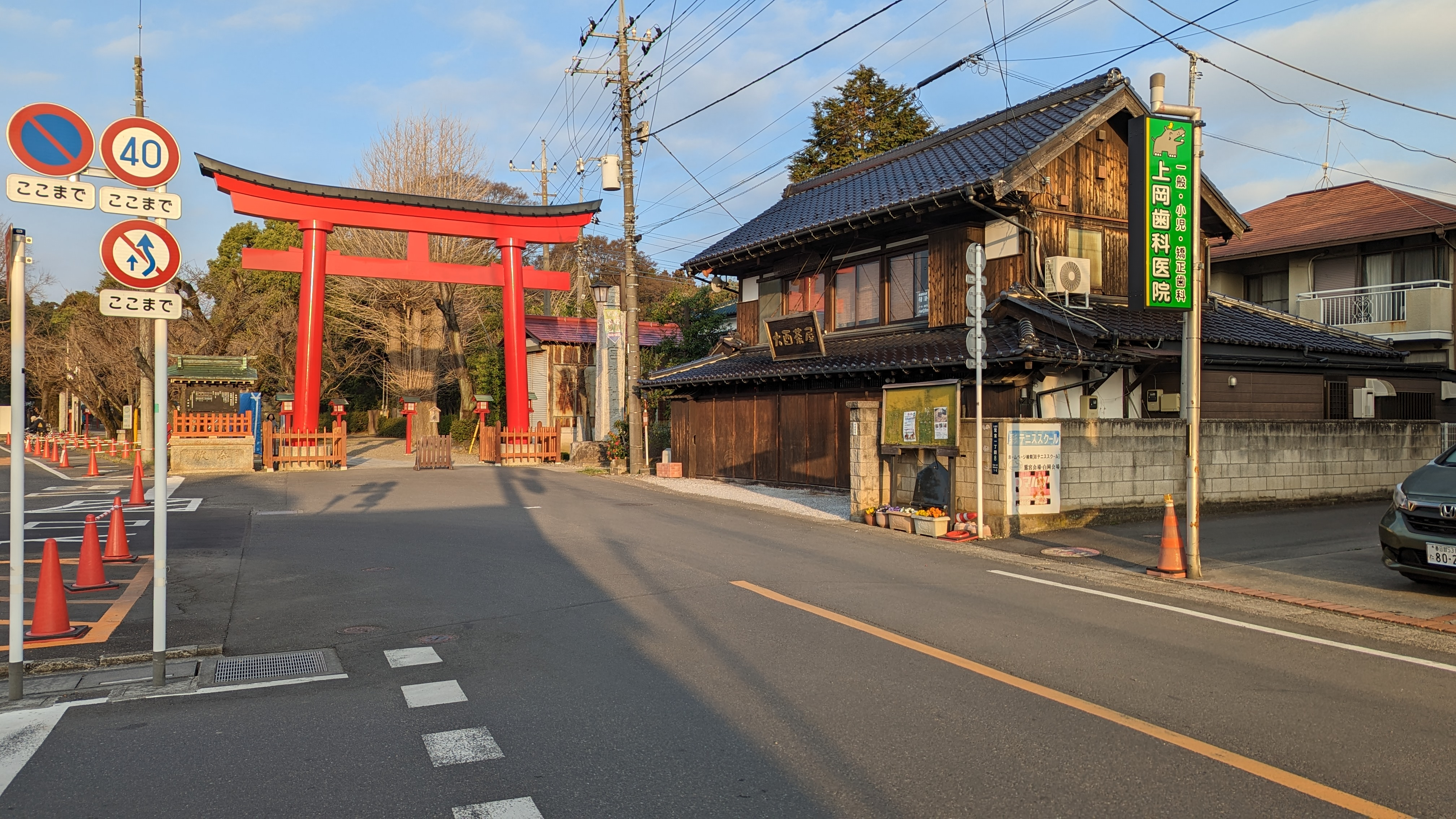
The discovery of the main gate of Washinomiya Shrine, which was reproduced in the opening of Lucky Star from roughly this camera angle, was a key moment in the early days of seichi junrei blogging.

Seichi junrei (聖地巡礼, lit. 'pilgrimage to sacred places') is a Japanese buzzword and internet slang term describing a form of pop-culture tourism or film tourism where fans of anime subculture-related media make visits to real-world locations featured as settings, backgrounds, or general inspiration for their favorite series. The "Seichi" prefix is often included in order to make a distinction between this secular fan behavior and religiously-significant Japanese Buddhist Junrei (巡礼).

Locations for secular seichi can encompass the aforementioned backgrounds and settings, inspiration for the name of a character, or a place that happens to share a name with a character or series. Locations that have strong memories for all kinds of fans, such as sports stadiums, have also sometimes been figuratively called seichi. The act of touring these sites like a pilgrim came to be called junrei, with intended contrast to historic junrei.

Tourism to locations featured in manga, dramas, games, and anime is also often called Contents tourism. Seichi Junrei-sha is the term used to describe enthusiasts who engage with the practice. Additional terms such as rokechi-meguri (ロケ地巡り, lit. 'location tour') and butai tanbou (舞台探訪, lit. 'stage exporation') are closely tied or synonymous to seichi junrei. Butai tanbou usually describes the more specific practice of superimposing fan photography to the camera angles featured in the related content.

Japan's Cabinet Office also noted that animation and manga works originating from and set in Japan have gained many fans outside of Japan as "Cool Japan" content. Using the language of seichi junrei – along with anime tourism and contents tourism – Japan's central government, local chambers of commerce, business associations, and private interest groups have promoted the practice as a measure to increase the number of tourists visiting Japan, to attract visitors from seichi to the surrounding conventional regional tourist resources, and to stimulate local consumption spending.

== Places ==
Religious holy sites are often intentionally distinguished from their surroundings by special design choices and decorations, whereas the "sacred sites" that are the subject of these fan "pilgrimages" remain unchanged from before they were made "sacred", with the added value of some sort of narrative that makes them "sacred" to fans.

Shooting Locations from Japanese TV dramas and movies are usually easily identified by fans because of the nature of live-action filming, and film commissions sometimes publicize locations, so their seichi are easily "confirmed". On the other hand, in the case of manga and anime, there are fewer examples of locations being publicly announced, and seichi are usually first "confirmed" during or after release based on the subjective opinions of fans who have conducted on-site or digital Google Street View surveying trips. The degree of "reproduction" between the actual location and the depiction in illustrated mediums depends on the art style and intended sense of place of the work. There are also works in which the creator clearly states the name of the actual place where the work is set via dialogue, images and illustrations, official commentary books, websites, etc., or in which local authorities makes a visible appeal as a destination through posters, billboards, events, standees, stamp rallies, collaborations, and more.

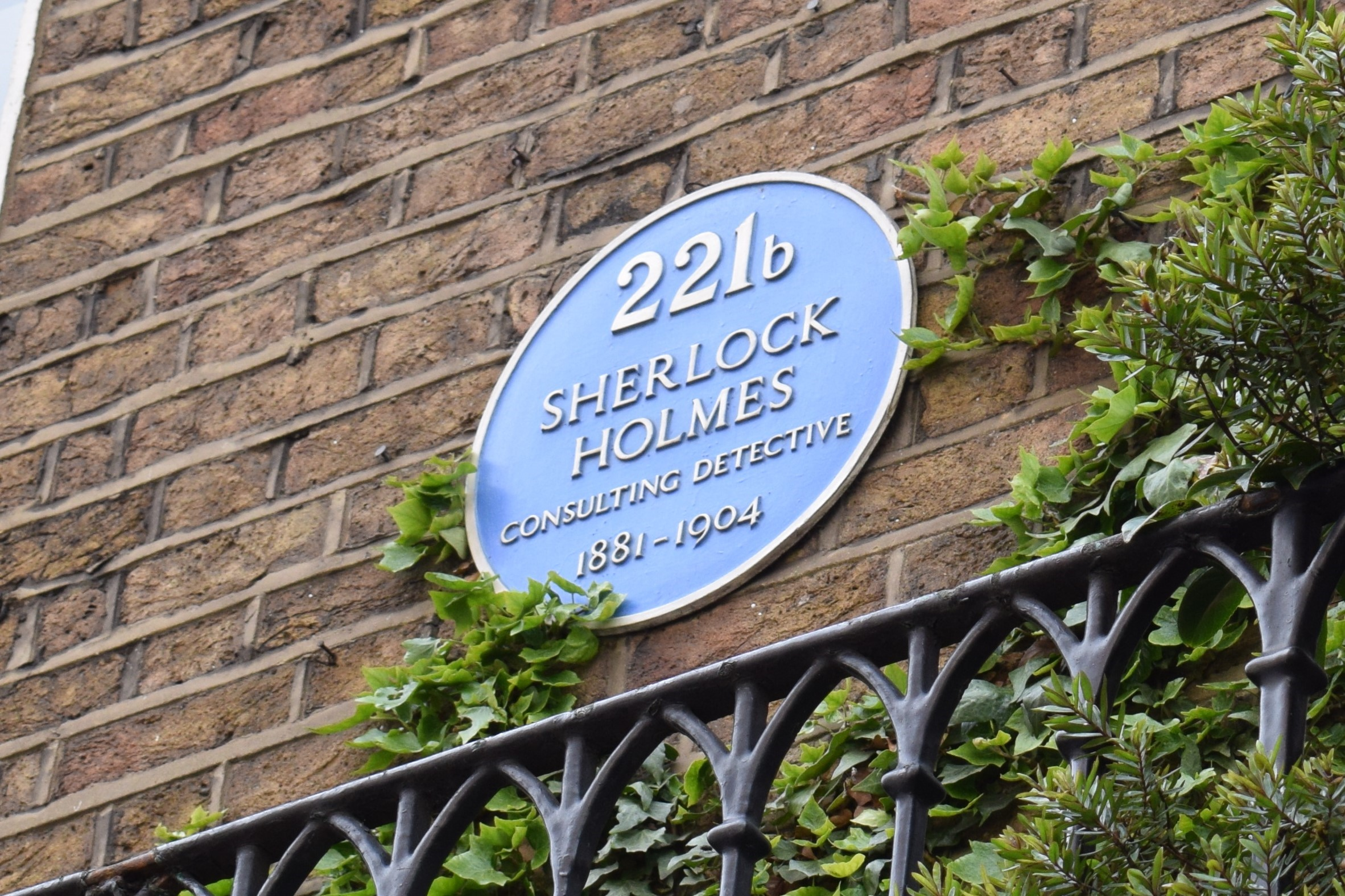
A blue plaque commemorating Sherlock Holmes' fictional residence at 221B Baker Street.

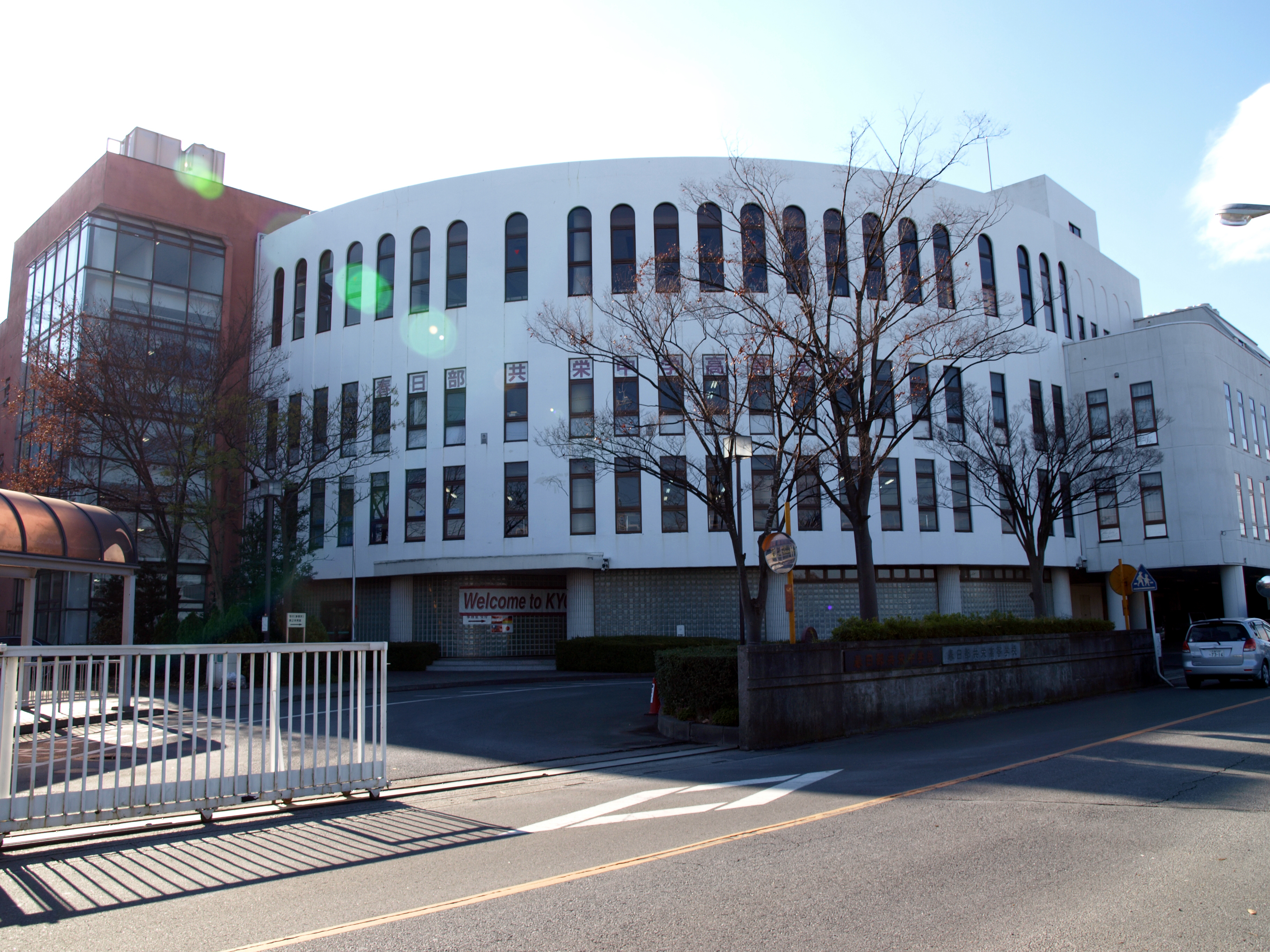
Kasukabekyoei High School was used as the model school for Lucky Star, but it is not particularly visually distinct, making it a "sacred place" only for fans of the series.

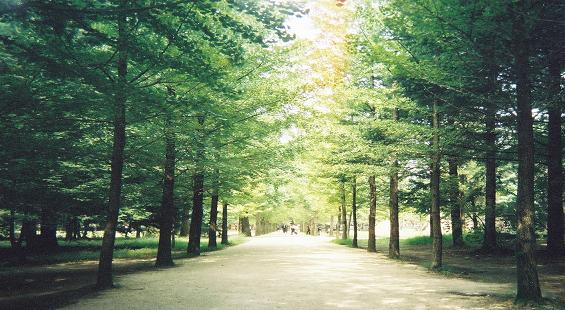
The metasequoia trees in Namiseom are a "sacred site" for fans of Winter Sonata and are a site of seichi junrei. After the broadcast of Winter Sonata, the area around the trees was improved to accommodate the uptick of visitors.

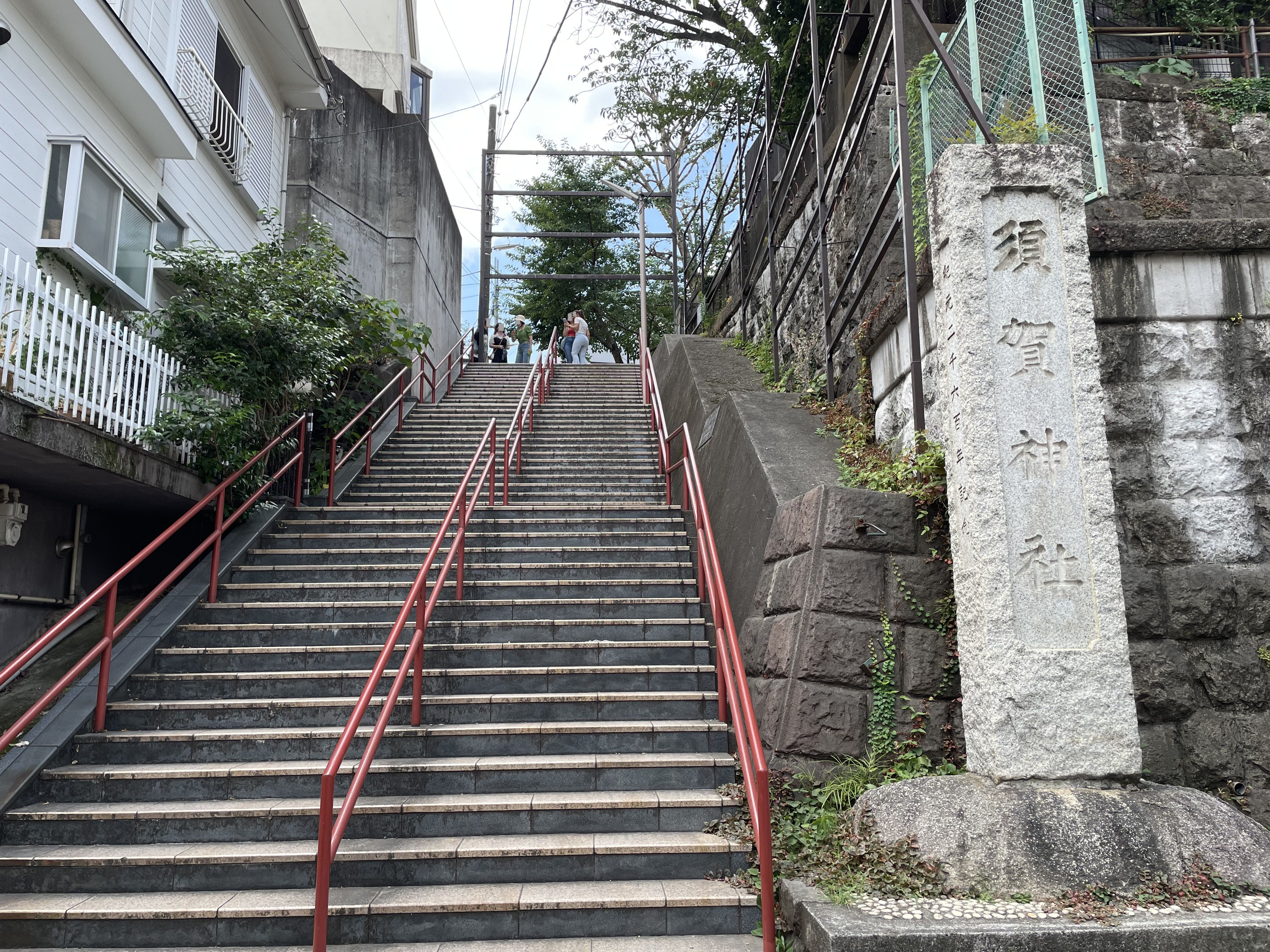
The red staircase at Suga Shrine as featured in Your Name, subjected to a high amount of tourism following the film's release.

== History ==
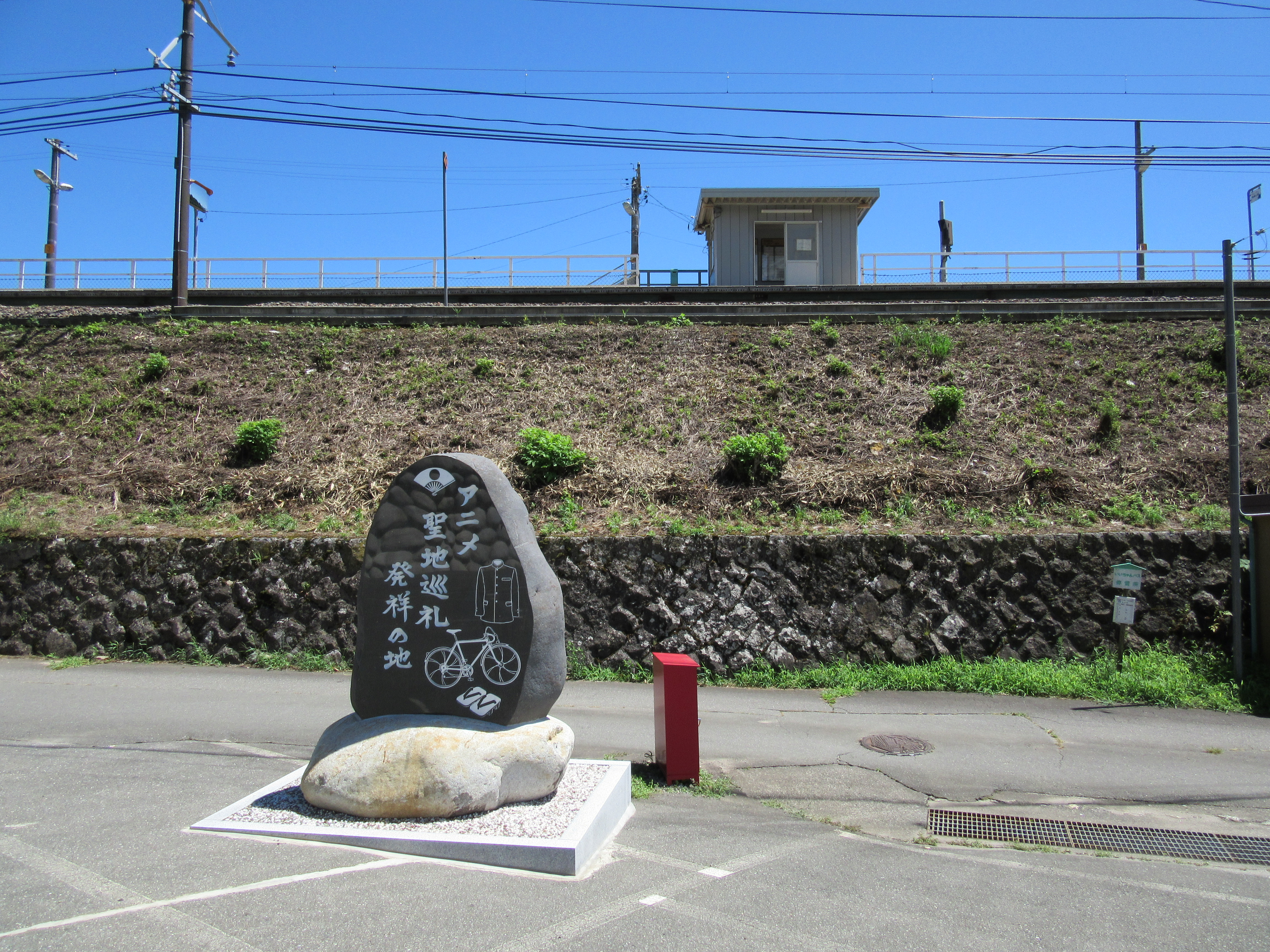
Tagiri Station and the birthplace monument of anime pilgrimage

This kind of fan behavior was not limited to anime and manga, but visiting the settings of various literary works and movies had been seen many times before then in the scope of pop-culture tourism, film tourism, and literary tourism. Writings on contents tourism also tie seichi junrei to a longer and broader history of Japanese media tourism.

221B Baker Street, where fictional literary detective Sherlock Holmes is said to live, has a blue plaque despite his fictional invention, and Meiringen, at the foot of Reichenbach Falls, where The Final Problem takes place, has become a tourist spot visited by Sherlock fans from around the world, with a road sign showing directions in the novel and an active museum.

The first anime location tourism began in or before 1974 with Heidi, Girl of the Alps's depiction of the Swiss Alps, especially Maienfeld, Switzerland. Many other series belonging to NHK's World Masterpiece Theater time slot also inspired outbound overseas tourism, such as Dog of Flanders and Anne of Green Gables. Ashita no Joe and Rumiko Takahashi's Urusei Yatsura and Maison Ikkoku are other early domestically Japanese examples.

The 1991 OVA of Kyūkyoku Chōjin R is an early example of a work that did not hide the names of locations and other specific places and instead incorporated them into the narrative in a metafictional way, resulting in the creation of destinations by fans. The Tenchi Muyo! series is often regarded as an early representative example of linking fictional locations to the places from which they were named, appealing to the audience as seichi and inducing tourism demand. On the other hand, in the case where the media does not directly encourage fans to find and visit the locations, the Sailor Moon series can be cited as the origin of this type of activity. An early example of a TV anime triggering seichi junrei since then is Please Teacher! (2002) but it was 2007 Lucky Star's depiction of Washinomiya Shrine that fronted the boom in internet-powered discussion and practice of seichi junrei, especially near the end of the 2000s.

While location hunting of the places where the original story took place has been done before for anime adaptations, it was The Melancholy of Haruhi Suzumiya that led to increased fervor for seichi junrei, and Nishinomiya Kita High School in Hyogo Prefecture, where the light novel author Tanigawa Nagaru was born, became the most famous destination of this pilgrimage.

The anime that followed Lucky Star and inspired seichi junrei proper often adopted a technique of preparing photographs of actual landscapes and buildings on location scouting trips and tracing them to create anime background art, or adjusting the levels of an image, tracing, and adding screentones in image manipulation software for the backgrounds of manga panels, as seen in Inio Asano's notable background style. Several visual novels of the 2000s and 2010s also used real-world images passed through photo filters for background art, or were illustrations based on real-world photographs.

On March 7, 2012, NHK General TV's news program Close-Up Gendai aired a special feature on seichi junrei titled "Dramatic Changes in the Anime Industry: The Mystery of Seichi Junrei". In addition, "seichi junrei" was selected as one of the buzzwords in the 2016 U-Can Shingo Ryukogo Taisho announced on December 1, 2016. The movie Kimi no na wa. released in August 2016 was released to great box office success and critical acclaim beyond the Otaku subculture, and many people made a trip to Hida, Gifu Prefecture where the film's rural locations were set and the red staircase at Suga Shrine.

In 2016, KADOKAWA, JTB, Japan Airlines, and other businesses relevant to anime, manga, and tourism formed the Anime Tourism Association. On August 26, 2017, the association published "88 Japanese Anime Holy Places to Visit" (2018 edition), which has been published annually since. The number 88 refers to the number of temples on Shikoku Junrei, and the number of places selected is now greater than 88.

In 2018, a "Birthplace Seichi Junrei" monument was erected by volunteers near Tagiri Station, associated with the OVA version of Kyūkyoku Chōjin R and unveiled on July 28.

In 2019, Japan's first Anime Tourism Summit was held in Kitakyushu by the Anime Tourism Association.

== Essays ==
Artist and critic Yohei Kurose describes the method of using real-life scenery for anime production: "When this method is used, the scenery of real space is directly inserted into the fictional space of the animation, creating a discrepancy, but such awkwardness is what gives reality to the work." Kurose uses the concept of "formulae of emotions" proposed by art historian Aby Warburg.

The literary critic Ryota Fukushima notes that a place can be turned into a seichi site simply by adding a story to the original place, and argues that seichi junrei is a form of pseudo-historical imagination that gives some imaginary origin of pseudo-history to the real "present" of authentic history.

Critic Yuichi Murakami argued that seichi exist "between reality and ficiton", and that they become "landscapes" when projected onto ficiton, and junrei when projected onto reality. In this way, the concept of seichi junrei, which was originally associated with place, can be generalized to a wider range of practices and objects. For example, the case of fans replicating the choreography featured in the ending theme of The Melancholy of Haruhi Suzumia, or the case of K-On! triggering some fans to purchase guitars featured in the series.

Tourism and religion scholar Ryōske Okamoto relates Lucky Star's Washinomiya Shrine and AnoHana's Chichibu Shrine to the power spots of Japanese new spirtuality.

== Regional Impact ==
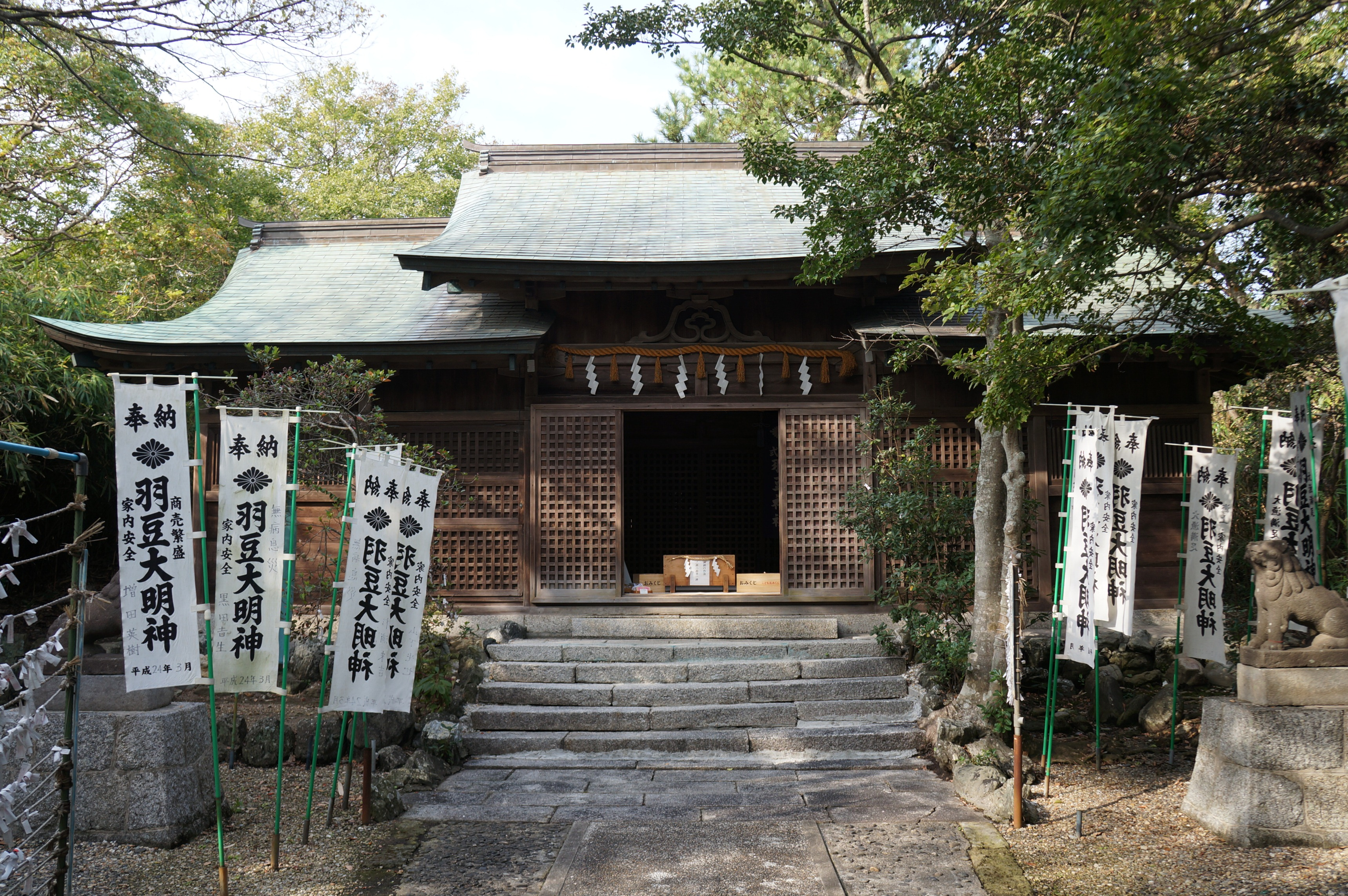
Hazu Shrine, where many SKE48 fans dedicate ema, and a monument to SKE48's song "Hazumisaki'' located in Hazumisaki Park. In 2012, when the song ranked first in a popularity poll, the number of visits from fans increased, and in 2013 the local tourism association erected a monument to promote the song.

=== Merits ===
When a famous work is set in a place or the author's hometown, it becomes a valuable tourist resource, as many people visit to experience the thoughts and feelings of the characters.

Stratford-upon-Avon, William Shakespeare's hometown, was a commercial town, but after David Garrick held a commemorative festival in 1769, it became a tourist town attracting 2.5 million visitors annually. In recent years, Stratford-upon-Avon has become a theater town, with the Royal Shakespeare Theatre being built in the city.

When the Sherlock Holmes series was translated around the world, 221B Baker Street and Reichenbach Falls became tourist attractions, and souvenir shops gathered around the area.

In Japan, since the postwar period, local governments, tourism associations, chambers of commerce, and film commissions have actively cooperated in the production of films as part of their efforts towards community building and revitalization, and there are increasing frequencies of cases where they market and promote the fact that a certain film was shot in their region. Local restaurants and stores might display posters featuring the media, or maps of filming locations and other related points of interest, and notebooks are often set up to allow visitors to leave mementos, comments, or fan illustrations. According to a 2016 report by Juroku Research Institute, tourists visiting Gifu to engage in anime tourism for A Silent Voice, Your Name, and Rudolf the Black Cat were estimated at a combined 1.3 million people, and were estimated to have contributed 25.3 billion yen to Gifu's economy. Some of the Yamanashi campsites featured in Yuru Camp reported a triple increase in visitors.

The city of Sakaiminato, Tottori Prefecture is the birthplace of GeGeGe no Kitarō mangaka Shigeru Mizuki. The city developed a region called "Kitaro Road" lined with statues of Mizuki's yōkai illustrations and successfully promoted itself as "Kitaro's Hometown". Later, Himi, Toyama Prefecture, the birthplace of Fujiko Fujio, promoted itself around the theme of Ninja Hattori-kun and developed a statue-lined road in addition to a themed train, following Sakaiminato's successful formula.

In recent years, there have also been examples where the purpose is to promote the area where the work is set as a permanent living place in addition to tourism promotion. In Kasukabe, Saitama, the Nohara family, the main cast of Crayon Shin-chan, have been given a special resident certificate (特別住民票) to support child rearing and education.

With the success of Densha Otoko in 2005, otaku culture, or the "moe industry", began to permeate into the general public, and the economic effects of anime made for enthusiasts began to be reported on in the press. Although the total number of people moved by these series is smaller than more general-audience dramas and films, they are characterized with a high turnover rate in sales of related goods, and in some cases, they have revitalized local shopping districts. Unlike with dramas or films, there is no need to get intellectual property clearance to use the likeness of actors, and advertising can be produced at a lower cost. The case of Lucky Star and Washinomiya in particular drew much attention from academic and economic perspectives as a successful example of using otaku-oriented media to revitalize. The number of hatsumōde visitors to Washinomiya increased from 90,000 in 2006 to 470,000 in 2008. Lucky Star fans contribute to annual festivals at Washinomiya and parade a mikoshi portable shrine showcasing amateur illustrations of Lucky Star characters.

In 2009, a life-size RX-78-02 Gundam was installed in Odaiba, and within two weeks of its opening to the public, the number of visitors exceeded 1 million. Meanwhile, a giant statue of the robot form Tetsujin 28-go was built in Nagata-ku, Kobe City, in honor of Mitsuteru Yokoyama, a cartoonist from the city.

In some cases, local governments take the initiative in sponsoring manga and light novel contests to introduce new works set in their hometowns to the world. The movie Ganbatte Ikimasshoi, for example, for which devoted fans made a pilgrimage to Matsuyama, Ehime, is based on a coming-of-age novel that won the "Botchan Literature Award" sponsored by Matsuyama.

In addition to the economic benefits, it also has the effect of broadening human ties, such as creating attachment from the fans of content to the area and deepening exchanges among local businesses through tie-up projects. Hokkaido University associate professor Takayoshi Yamamura authored a triangular model arguing a nearly mutual relationship between fans, producers, and local authorities.

=== Concerns ===
While the above advantages are significant, there are many cases where the work itself may end up disappearing from relevance if it does not gain momentum.

Many of the places targeted for pilgrimages are facilities or buildings where no visual distinction can be seen, and in some cases, general residences, schools, and other facilities are included in the neighborhood, which may cause anxiety to local residents who are unaware of the situation, thereby disturbing and inconveniencing their daily lives. Unlike live-action, anime (especially risqué "late-night" broadcasts) are not filmed on location with the participation of on-screen actors, and are sometimes not advertised by local stations, governments, or chambers of commerce.

Most TV anime have a broadcast period of roughly three months to one year, and seichi junrei is usually most popular during and after airing. If the popularity of a TV program - anime or otherwise - is a short-lived "boom and bust", the "boom" may pass by the time the local community is ready to accept a sudden increase in the number of pilgrims (tourists), leaving the destination area with only confusion and burdens. As a countermeasure, the producers of the Yuru Camp anime and Yamanashi Prefecture established a cooperative relationship immediately after the decision was made to make an animated series, and the Yamanashi Tourism Organization prepared a special website to introduce the sacred sites as soon as the series began airing.

Pilgrims sometimes act in bizarre ways that are suspicious in the eyes of local residents unfamiliar with the work and the extenuating circumstances. Some more extreme fans might violate the unwritten rules of meiwaku (迷惑) or commit outright illegal acts such as trespassing to access seichi in secluded and private spaces. As an example, some fans broke into the grounds of a high school in Nishinomiya, Hyogo, which is said to be the model school in the Haruhi Suzumiya series, and painted graffiti on the grounds of the school. Similar problems occurred on the grounds of the Numazu, Shizuoka school modeled in Love Live! Sunshine!! in addition to vandalism of manhole covers. Free! graffiti was found at Arasuna Shrine in Iwami, Tottori, which was featured in the anime with its name intact. For these reasons, the producers of some works have called for self-restraint or halting of seichi junrei. Problems of tourists committing crimes and violating etiquette certainly are not exclusive to seichi junrei-sha, and negative impacts extend to conventional tourism as well.

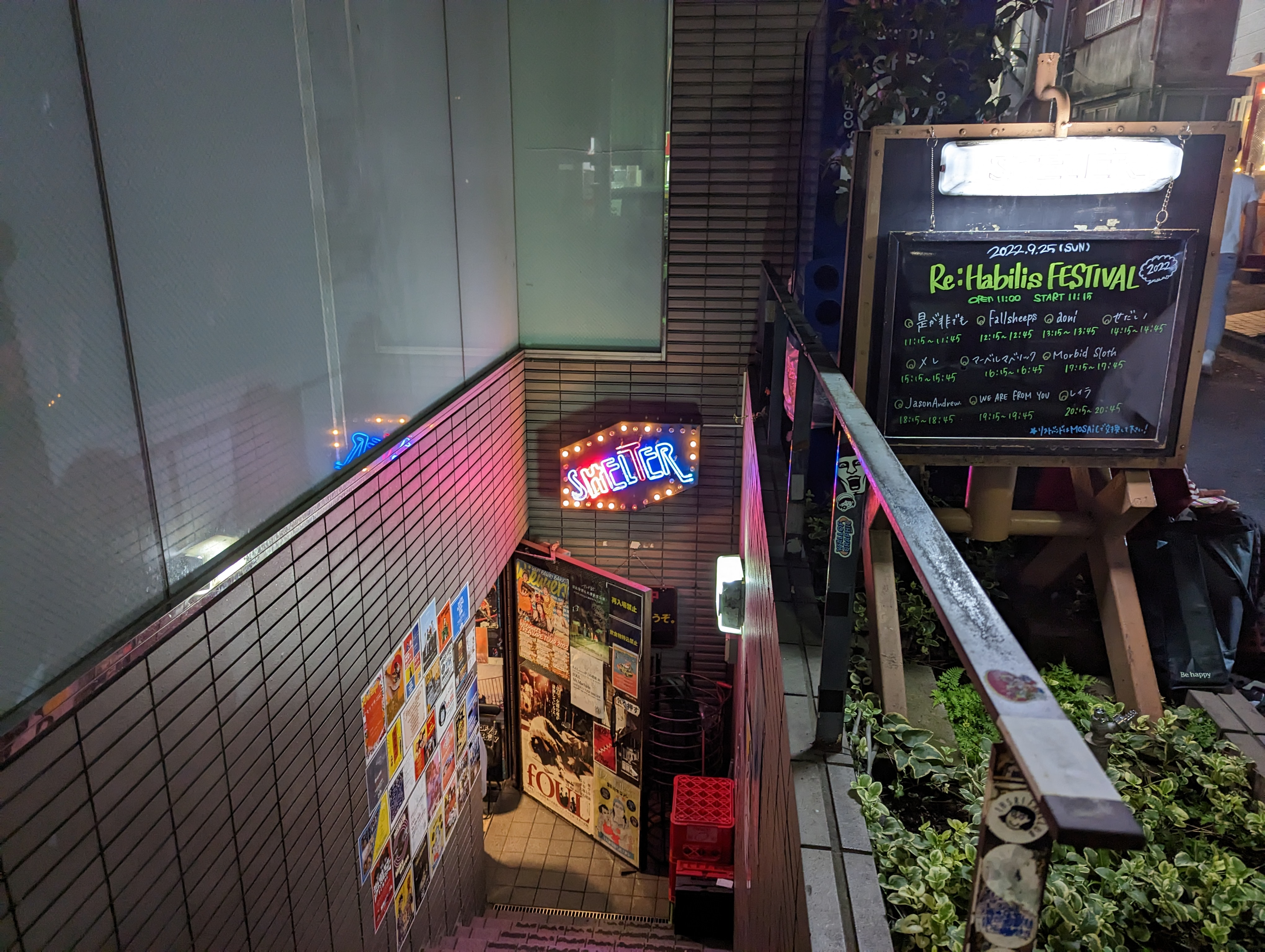
The Shelter live house featured in Bocchi the Rock!. Fans frequently trespassed to take photos at the base of this staircase.

While businesses can benefit from seichijunrei-sha, sometimes they are seen as a nuisance, especially those who trespass, loiter, or intend to conduct seichi junrei while trying not to interact with the business in conventional means (making purchases, using services). Shelter, the live house venue featured in Bocchi the Rock!, witnessed fans of the series attending concerts without paying for tickets or otherwise trespassing on the property of the venue and its neighbors. A post was made to encourage proper behavior on the anime's official website. Persona 5 developers Atlus made a post on their website regarding fan behavior causing inconveniences, particularly when visiting a particular laundromat in Sangenjaya "for purposes other than using its services".

A city or neighborhood might be featured in types of media that residents do not want to be associated with, as in the case of the Higurashi When They Cry murder mystery visual novel series and anime, reportedly deemed by some residents of Shirakawa Village as excessively violent or obscene, in addition to concerns over seichi junrei-sha committing meiwaku. Shirakawa created an official manga to serve as a manners guide for Higurashi fans and conventional tourists. Similar distaste for association has been noted near infamous AV shooting locations such as the Hanazono Room.

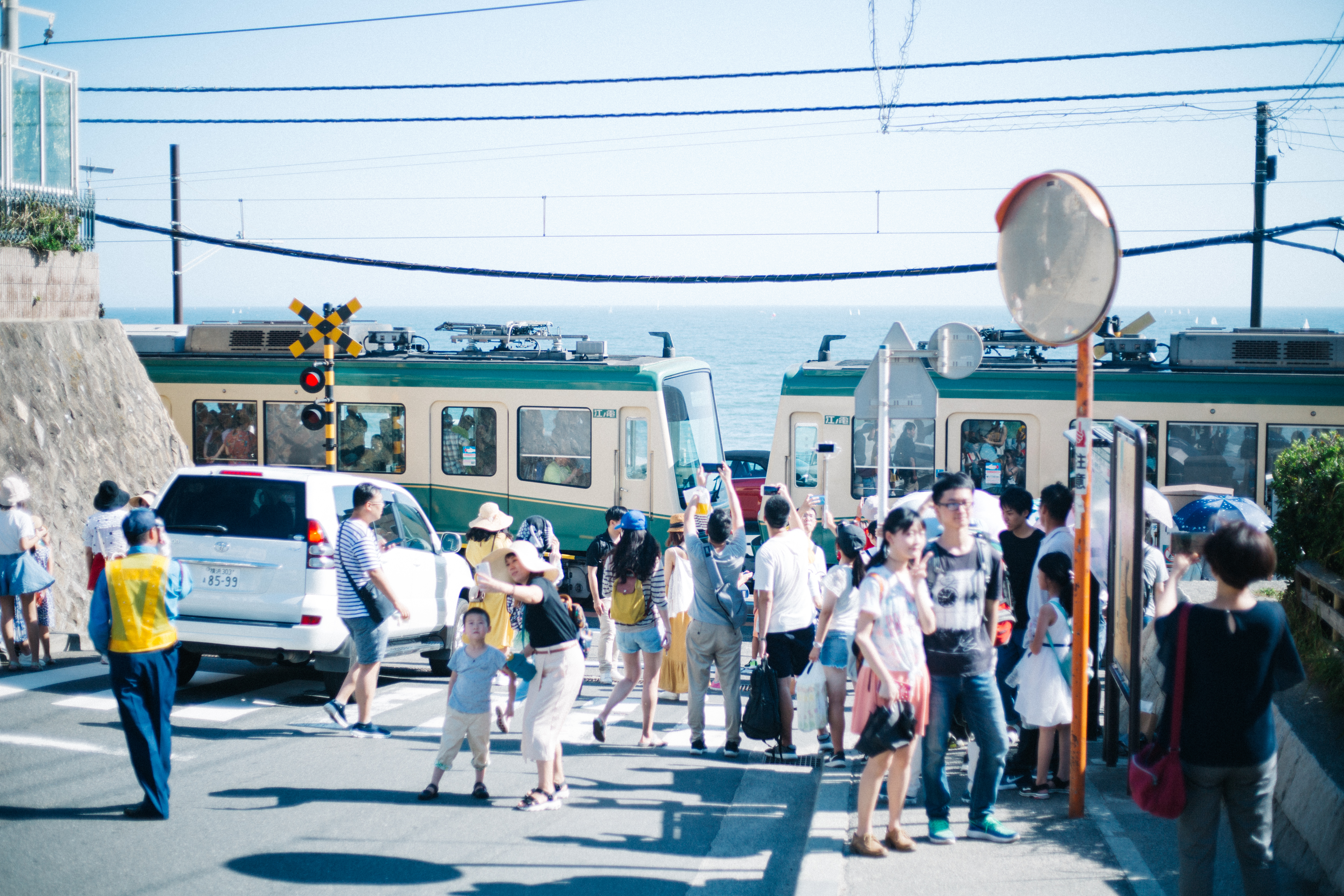
Slam Dunk fans blocking car traffic at a rail crossing near Enoshima

Seichi junrei to otherwise incredibly popular tourist locations and a few particularly popular seichi can contribute to overtourism. After the closing of COVID-era tourism restrictions and the release of The First Slam Dunk, the volume of overseas and domestic Slam Dunk fans visiting a certain rail crossing on the Enoshima Electric Railway in Kamakura and taking pictures exceeded what the area could feasibly withstand. Tourists often resorted to entering the road and completely blocking car traffic. Security guards hired by Kamakura's city government were assigned to monitor the crossing during peak times, and the Kamakura Police Station received upwards of 100 police reports regarding the crossing in 2023. The situation was reported on heavily by Japanese press, which related it to other hotspots of post-Covid overtourism, such as Kyoto.

Local businesses and stores in seichi spots sometimes create and sell unauthorized goods without considering copyright restrictions, because they are hot sellers. Such a case was seen in Oarai, Ibaraki, where Bandai Namco Filmworks' Girls und Panzer was set. In response, GuP producer Kiyoshi Sugiyama strengthened relations with the local community by first turning a blind eye and then later signing official contracts. After hearing cases where the government was involved in top-down collaborations with local communities from the start and the result was failure, Sugiyama did not have much faith in the power of using anime for local revitalization. Despite his misgivings, the relationship between fans of Girls und Panzer and Oarai is now considered a success story for seichi junrei.

The collaboration between Bandai Namco Filmworks, also the producers of Lagrange: The Flower of Rin-ne and Kamogawa, Chiba is considered by some to be one such case of failure. The name Kamogawa, landmarks of the city, and its meibutsu (culturally significant regional goods) appeared frequently in the anime, but fans were critical of the fact that the attempt for a tie-in felt like blatant product placement. In truth, the city did not incite or sponsor the creation the anime with the intention of revitalizing Kamogawa, and the Rin-ne no Lagrange Kamogawa Promotion Committee claims that they learned of the anime's production after the fact.

== Related works ==
- Books (In addition to the books listed below, there are many cases in which guides are produced as doujinshi and distributed at doujinshi sales events like Comiket.)
  - Toshimichi, Kakizaki (2005). 聖地巡礼 アニメ・マンガ12ヶ所めぐり (in Japanese). Kill Time Communications. ISBN 9784860321437.
  - 聖地巡礼Navi (in Japanese). Asuka Shinsha Inc. 2010. ISBN 9784870319950.
  - Yūsaku Igarashi (2013). 花屋敷澄花の聖地巡礼 (in Japanese). KADOKAWA ASCII Media Works, Dengeki Bunko. ISBN 9784048917452. A light novel about seichi junrei.
  - Shiori, Nishio (2018). Shoujo Junrei (in Japanese). Cygames Comics, Kodansha. ISBN 9784065147788. A shoujo ai manga about a young woman who moves to Tokyo to seichi junrei to locations related to a fictional manga series that 'saved her life' and connect with its mangaka, not knowing she is secretly in the room next to her new apartment.
- Looking for Magical Doremi - An animated film released in 2020 released to commemorate the 20th anniversary of Ojamajo Doremi, where the original story itself is a play within a play, and the main focus is on visiting the area that became the motif of the original.
- アニメ聖地旅 - a program broadcast on NHK in 2022.
- Smartphone Apps
  - Butai-meguri (舞台めぐり) was a Japan-only Android and iOS app developed by Sony Music Solutions Inc. for facilitating official butai tanbou and seichi junrei with support for maps, geofencing, and AR photography. It went defunct in 2023.
- In addition, there are many cases of fan blogs and other officially publicized information.

== Events ==
- Anime & Manga Festival in Saitama (also known as "Anitama Festival"): an event held in Saitama since 2013.
- Anime Tourism Summit, held by the Anime Tourism Association
- Stamp rallies, collaboration cafes, and museum exhibitions related to particular anime and manga

== Destinations ==
Because there are always fans of any anime and manga work, large or small, seichi jurnei is conducted by fans of all kinds of works. While the planned collaborative revitalization behavior is mostly domestic to Japan, fans may choose to visit international destinations such as featured seichi brought about by research and scouting trips in Europe and North America.

- The Studio Ghibli filmography
  - My Neighbor Totoro - Hachikokuyama Green, Matsugo, Tokorazawa, Saitama
  - Grave of the Fireflies - around Sannomiya, Chuo ward, Kobe, Hyogo
  - Only Yesterday - Takase district, Yamagata
  - Ocean Waves - Kochi City, Nerima Ward, Kichijoji, Musashino
  - Pom Poko - around Tama Hills, Tokyo
  - Whisper of the Heart - Irohazaka Slope, around Tama, Tokyo
  - Spirited Away - Dōgo Onsen
  - The Cat Returns - Yokohama
  - From Up on Poppy Hill - Port of Yokohama, Yamate Archives Museum, Yamashita Park, Hikawa Maru
- Mamoru Hosoda's filmography
  - The Girl who Lept Through Time (2006) - Downtown Tokyo (Shinjuku)
  - Summer Wars - Ueda, Nagano
  - Wolf Children - Nakaniikawa District, Kamiichi, Tateyama, Kunitaichi
  - Belle - Agawa District and Ino in Kōchi
- Makoto Shinkai's filmography
  - The Place Promised in Our Early Days - Hokkaido, Tsugaru region of Aomori
  - The Garden of Words - Shinjuku Gyo-en
  - Your Name (2016) - Hida, Gifu, red stairs at Suga Shrine, The National Art Center, Tokyo, NTT Docomo Yoyogi Building
  - Weathering with You - Yoyogi, Shibuya, Kōzu-shima
  - Suzume - Miyazaki, Kumamoto, Ōita, Ehime, Okayama, Hyōgo, Tokyo, Miyagi, Iwate
- To Every You I've Loved Before and To Me, the One Who Loved You - Ōita (city)
- Kenji Kamiyama's filmography
  - Eden of the East - Toyosu, Tokyo, Yokohama, Kyoto, Washington, DC, New York City
  - Napping Princess - Kurashiki, Okayama
- Kyoto Animation productions
  - Lucky Star - Kuki, Saitama (formerly Washimiya) Washinomiya Shrine
  - Clannad - Aomori, Kyoto, Tokyo
  - K-On! - Inukami, Shiga, Toyosato, Shiga, London, England
  - Hibike! Euphonium - Uji
  - Tamako Market and Tamako Love Story - Usagiyama Shotengai, Kyoto
  - Kyoukai no Kanata - Nara
  - Miss Kobayashi's Dragon Maid - Koshigaya, Saitama, New York City
  - Violet Evergarden - Nuremberg, Cochem Castle
- The Melancholy of Haruhi Suzumiya - Nishinomiya Kita HS, Nishinomiya, Hyogo
- So Ra No Wo To - Cuenca, Spain
- Neon Genesis Evangelion and the reboot film trilogy - Hakone, Kanagawa, Ube, Yamaguchi, Toei Kyoto Studio Park, Fuji-Q Highland Amusement Park
- Gundam franchise - Odaiba, Port of Yokohama, Shizuoka City, Edmonton, Alberta, Canada, Dublin, Ireland, Sydney, Australia, Davao City, Philippines
- Higurashi When They Cry - Shirakawa, Gifu, Historic Shirakawa-go
- Durarara!! - Ikebukuro, Sunshine City
- Super Cub - Hokuto, Yamanashi
- Insomniacs After School - Nanao, Ishikawa, Kanazawa, Osaka
- Summer Time Rendering - Tomogashima, Setonaikai National Park, Kada, Wakayama
- Bocchi the Rock! - Shimokitazawa, Enoshima, Kanazawa-Hakkei
- Girls und Panzer - Ōarai, Ibaraki

== See also ==
- Anime Tourism Association
- Otaku
- Community building
- Revitalization
- Shikoku Pilgrimage
- Junrei
- Washinomiya Shrine
- Film Tourism
- Pop-culture Tourism
- Contents Tourism
- Travel
