= Contents tourism =

Tourist activities involving settings of fictional works

Contents tourism (コンテンツツーリズム, kontentsu tsūrizumu) is a term used in Japanese media and tourism studies to describe tourism involving places which are the setting of works of literature, films, television dramas, manga, anime, and video games.

The vocabulary of contents tourism often changes to fit the variety of content, such as film tourism, anime tourism, and literary tourism. Seichi Junrei (聖地巡礼, lit. 'pilgrimage to sacred places') often appears in discussions of anime tourism, which is often used to describes visits to locations that inspired anime or other otaku-oriented media and, by its word choice, compares visiting these sites to making pilgrimages to sites of religious importance.

The first use of the term 'contents tourism' was in a 2005 report published by the joint efforts of the Ministry of Land, Infrastructure, Transport and Tourism, the Ministry of Economy, Trade, and Industry, and the Agency for Cultural Affairs titled Survey Report on Regional Development through the Production and Use of Video and Other Content (映像等コンテンツの制作・活用による地域振興のあり方に関する調査報告書).

== History in Japan ==
=== Early history ===
The specific origins of contents tourism are unclear, but can be traced back with some stretching of the analogy to the existence of utamakura in waka poetry. Even after the middle ages, stories and travel continued to be linked through various media, especially travelogues. The meisho ("famous places") in the Tale of Genji, Tale of the Heike, the works of Bashō, and Ogura Hyakunin Isshu are sometimes associated with the idea of literary contents tourism by scholars. Recently, meibutsu ("famous things") have often become branded as cross-promotional items to appeal to modern contents tourists. Many anime have featured meibutsu in the narrative, such as Golden Kamuy, Yakunara Mug Cup Mo, and Oishinbo. Series such as Sengoku Basara, Hakuouki, and Chihayafuru have caused a wave of new appreciation by young people for particular cultural artifacts and pre-existing heritage sites, sometimes by tapping into the reki-jo audience and creating appealing ikemen character designs for historic figures.

=== Postwar ===
The popularity of films and television after World War II led to a practice of tourism to locations where films and television dramas such as NHK's Taiga drama and asadora were shot, which became a major form of Japanese tourism in the 20th century. This practice included tourism to the sites of on-location shoots, like Onomichi after it appeared in Tokyo Story and film sets like Toei Kyoto Studio Park. In 2000, the first Japanese film commission was established in Osaka. Since then, many municipal governments in Japan have been courting producers of films, television dramas, and television commercials to select their regions as filming locations.

=== Internet Age ===
Since the mid-2000s, Seichi Junrei, a phrase invented in the Japanese blogosphere which draws a comparison between anime tourism and pilgrimages to holy sites, has become more popular. Within contents tourism, discussion of seichi junrei has become an increasingly popular touchstone for mass media. After it gained popularity as a niche grassroots hobby among Japanese bloggers, local governments and chambers of commerce sought out deals with animation producers for scouting trips, collaborations, and licensing to facilitate an official embracing of seichi junrei as a means to drive local tourism and revitalization. It was during this phase, alongside the birth of Cool Japan, that 'contents tourism' emerged as a useful term to contextualize seichi junrei, relating it to other forms of Japanese media tourism past and present. Anime tourism was even further legitimized and brought into the mainstream with the 2016 arrival of the Anime Tourism Association, a supergroup with members belonging to Japan's tourism industry and contents production companies which releases a list of 88 "Anime Spots" every year.

Revitalization and tourism driven by Japanese idol culture and the concept of the regional idol, circularly depicted in anime media such as Love Live! and Zombie Land Saga, which in turn triggered seichi junrei, is in some ways related to contents tourism. The popularity of the Akihabara stage shows of AKB48 was one of the drivers for the increase in popularity of Akihabara as a tourist destination.

== Journals and publications ==
Works related to contents tourism have frequently been published in Japan Forum.

The International Journal of Contents Tourism (IJCT), affiliated with Hokkaido University professors Takayoshi Yamamura and Philip Seaton, is an English-language scholarly journal focused on the discussion of contents tourism and seichi junrei. Yamamura and Seaton's book Contents Tourism in Japan contributed to the popularization of the buzzword.

== See also ==
- Film tourism
- Pop-culture tourism
- Seichi Junrei
