= Tobidashi Bōya =

Japanese road safety mascot

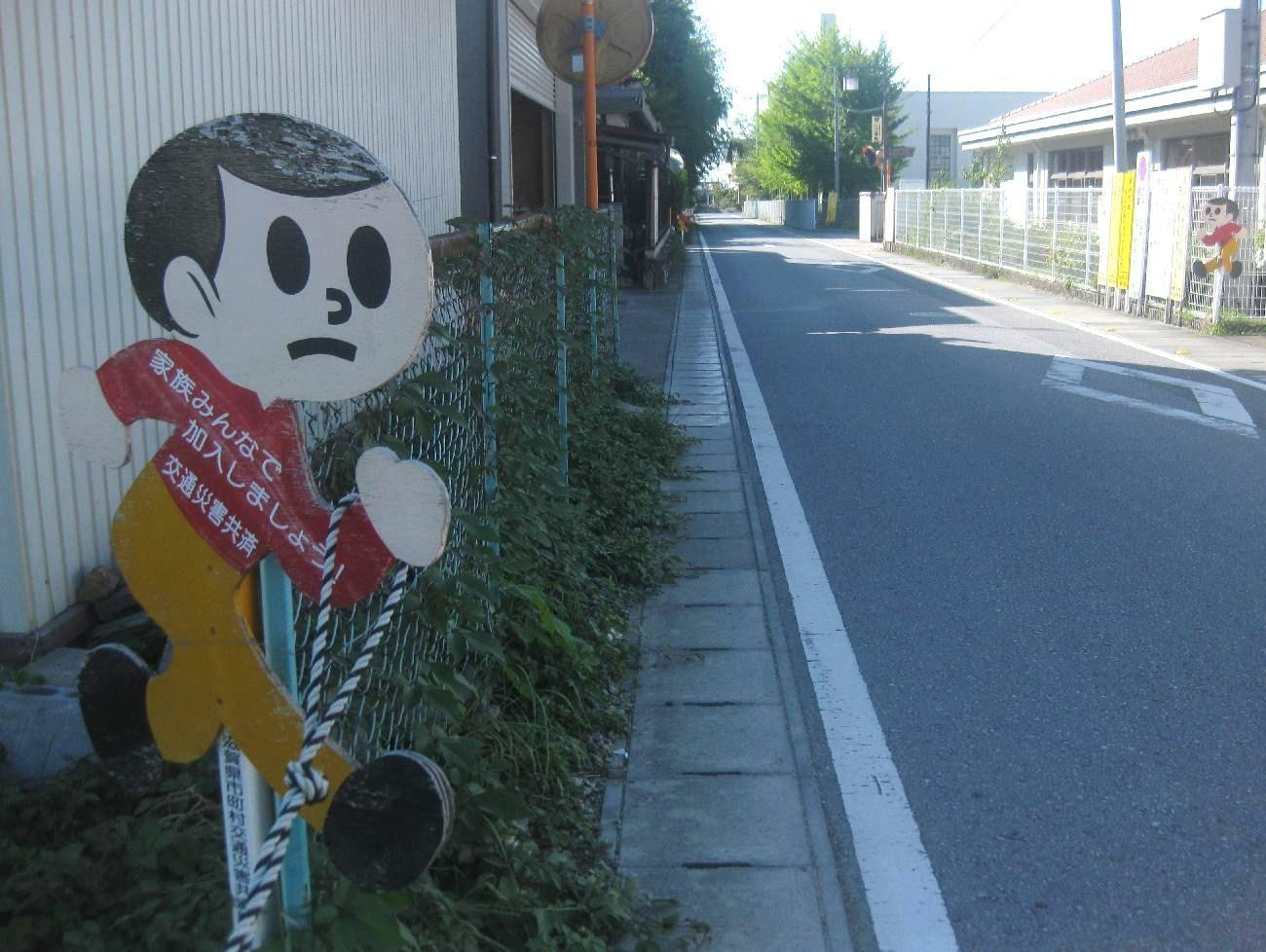
This design was dubbed "Version 0" by Miura Jun.

Tobidashi Bōya (飛び出し坊や, lit. 'Running Boy') is a traffic safety awareness mascot that appears on some flat signs in Japan near school zones to encourage drivers to slow down and remind children to watch for cars. Sometimes warning flags are included.

The sign, produced by Yasuhei Hisada for the city council of Yokaichi, Shiga Prefecture, was first called Tobita Tobidashi (飛出とび太, lit. 'Jumping-out Tobita'). Since there is no official name for this character, it has been called many different names in Japanese and in localized stories, including but not limited to Tobita-kun (とび太くん), Running Boy, and Tobidashi-Tobita (飛び出しとび太). The name Tobidashi Bōya was popularized by illustrator Miura Jun, but recently he has suggested that Tobidasanai-Bōya (飛び出さない坊や, lit. 'Boy who Doesn't Jump Out') might be more fitting.

== History ==
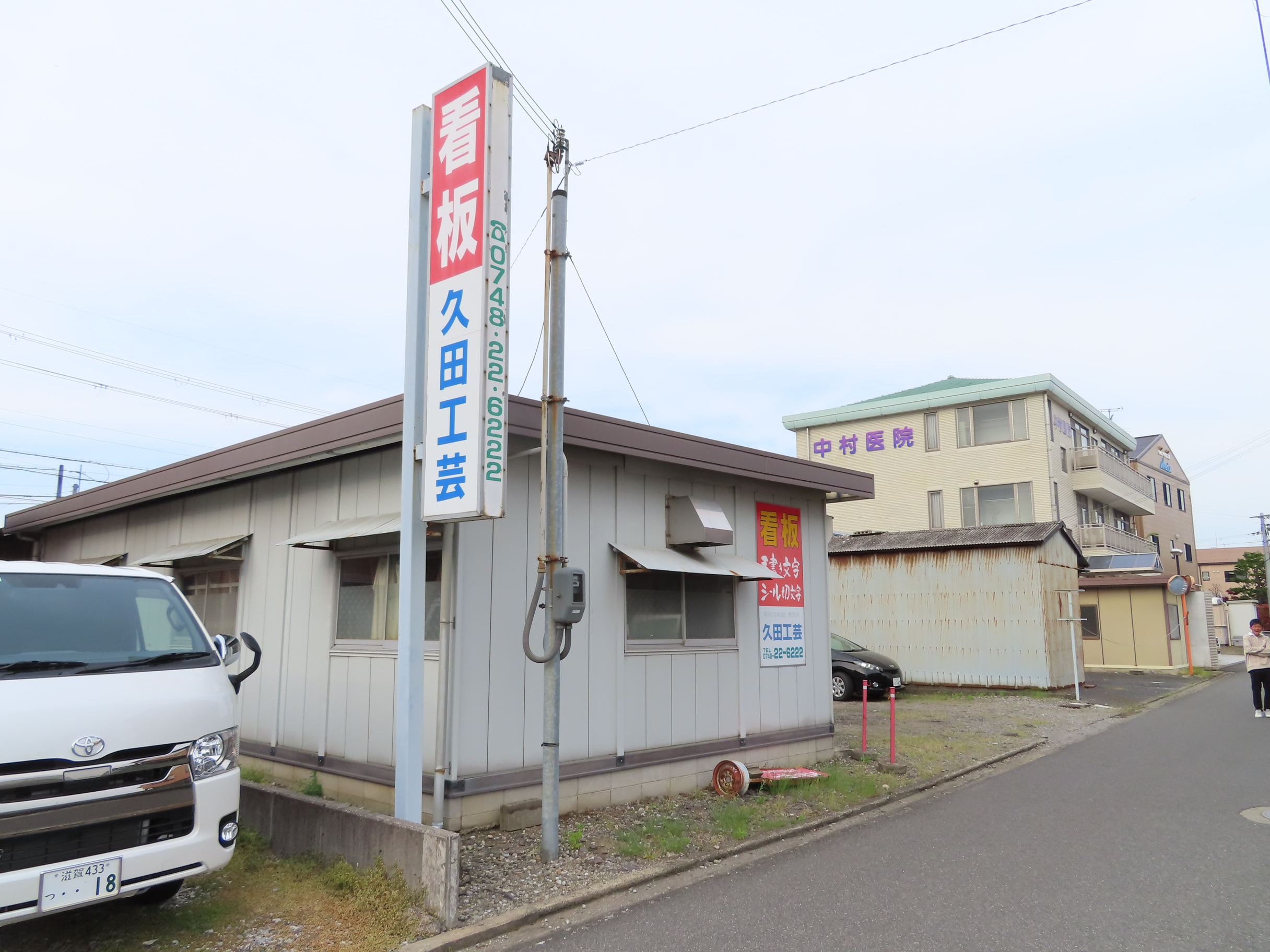
Hisada Crafts, Yokaichi, Shiga Prefecture

During the 50's and 60's, the so-called "Traffic Wars" began in Japan, during which signboards warning drivers about the risk of children jumping out into the street were plastered all across Japan, some featuring cartoonish illustrations. Early designs usually featured smaller drawings on rectangular signs and tended to use a similar yellow-red-black color palettes while not being exact copies.

Later signs would have larger illustrations be cut to the outline of the child. This new style of sign was kicked off when the Yokaichi City Social Welfare Council (currently the Higashiōmi City Social Welfare Council) requested the creation of signs warning children of the dangers of running out into the road. Their request was carried out in June 1973 by local sign maker Yasuei Hisada, becoming what Miura Jun would later call Version 0 (0系) due to all the signs it would later inspire. Consumer products based on Version 0 were produced and sold in Shiga as the popularity of the mascot increased and was adopted to the role of yuru-chara.

The installation and production of Tobidashi-bōya is mainly handled by local PTAs and neighborhood associations (chōnaikai). If the signs are installed on public land, they require a road occupancy permit from the road administrator, but since the purpose is traffic safety awareness, guerilla installations without permits are still sometimes tolerated. However, depending on where and how they are installed, Tobidashi-bōya can obstruct traffic, and are therefore deemed less acceptable in urban environments. In September 2003, a driver in Kobe, Hyōgo Prefecture crashed into a Tobidashi-bōya, and the elementary school PTA which installed the sign was made to pay damages.

In Ōmihachiman, Shiga Prefecture, some Tobidashi-bōya installed by junior high school students were stolen in November 2019.

== Designs ==
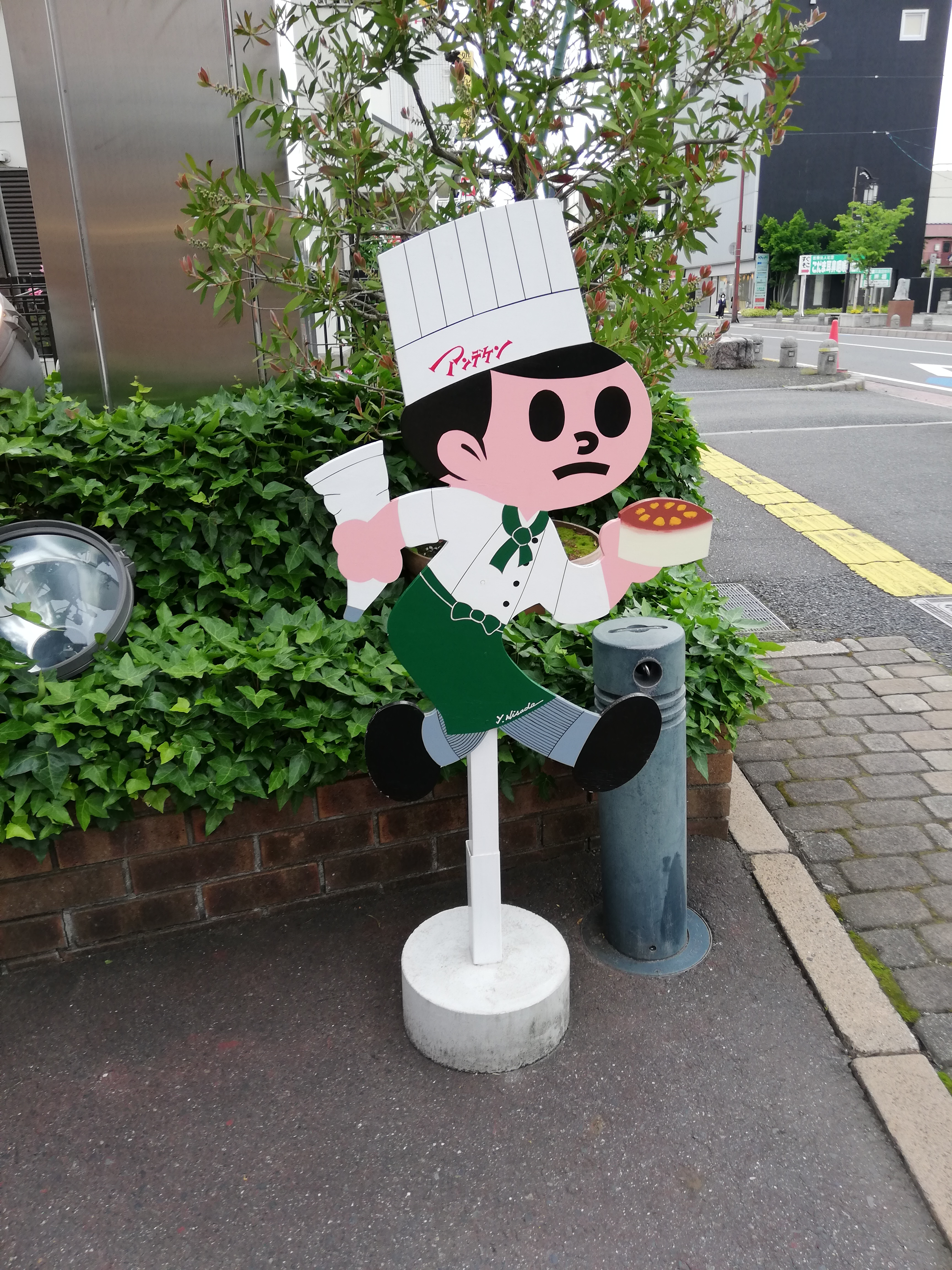
A Tobidashi-bōya in a certain bakery's uniform.

There are many eye-catching designs for Tobidashi-bōya. It is common to see both handmade designs and ready-made versions sold at home improvement centers. Design elements vary by era and region, and handmade signs in particular often have small design differences. Sometimes the likeness of popular manga and anime characters are morphed to fit Version 0's art style on unofficial handmade signs. As could be gathered from monikers like Bōya (坊や) and Kozo (小僧), most of the designs feature boys, but some depict girls and the elderly. There are some advocates pushing to use the regional differences in Tobidashi-boya as a means to promote tourism and local revitalization in addition to traffic safety. As an example of the revitalization angle, Toyosato-machi, Shiga Prefecture is the home of the former Toyosato Municipal Elementary School, which was the model for the school in the TV anime K-On! (Produced by Kyoto Animation). Tobidashi were installed near the school featuring the likenesses of each of the characters, which gave some attention to Toyosato on social media. There were also signs made depicting Konata Izumi from Lucky☆Star and the Vocaloid Hatsune Miku. Following this example, Tobidashi started to be associated with contents tourism.

Some Tobidashi-bōya variations are based on real people, certain tourist activities, celebrities, sport jerseys, or employee uniforms.

== See also ==
- jp:Ojigibito
- jp:Miyakojima Mamoru-kun
