= Mount Iwafune =

Mountain in Tochigi, Japan

Coordinates: 36°19′53″N 139°39′18″E

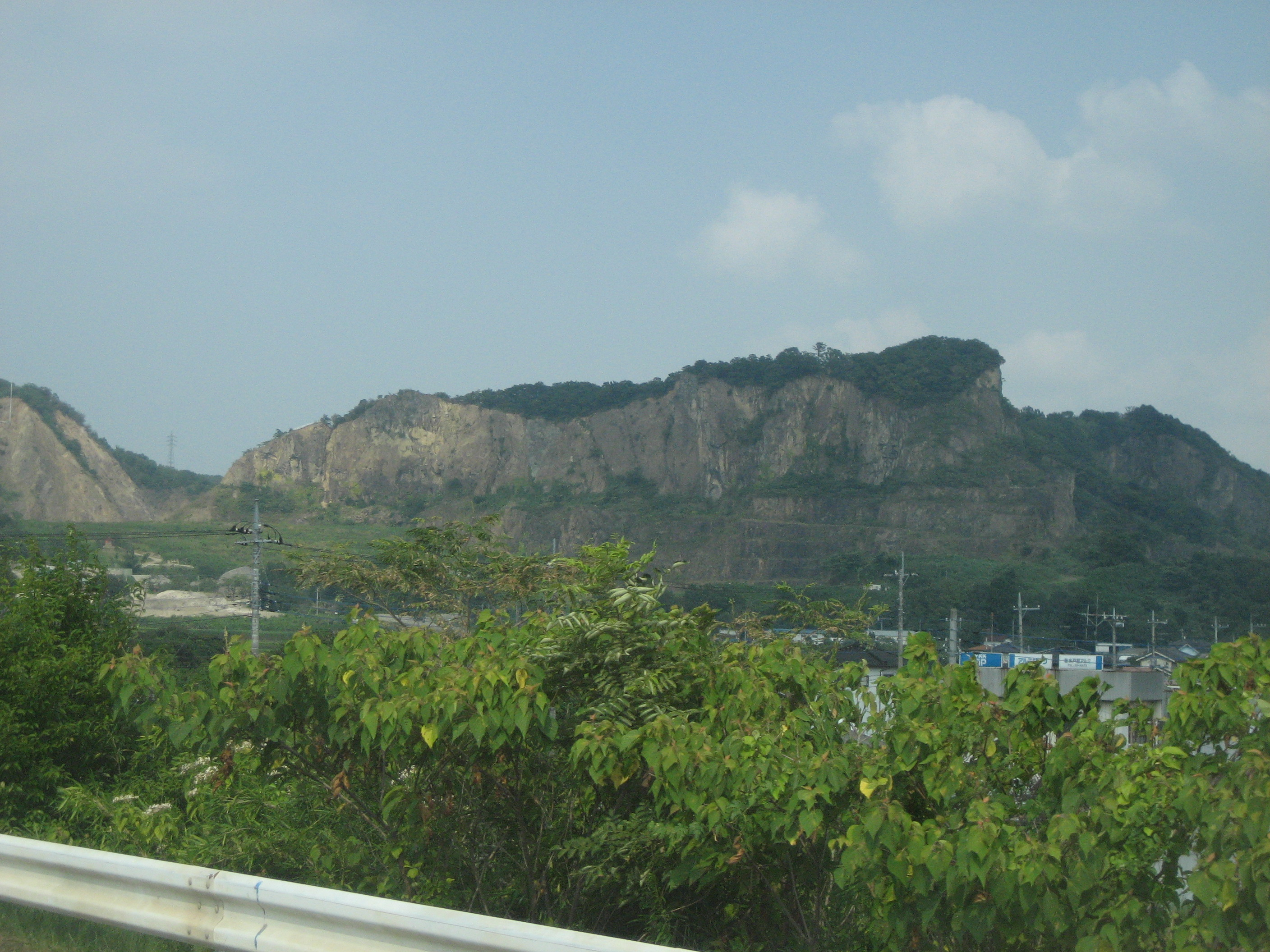
Before partial collapse (August 2008)

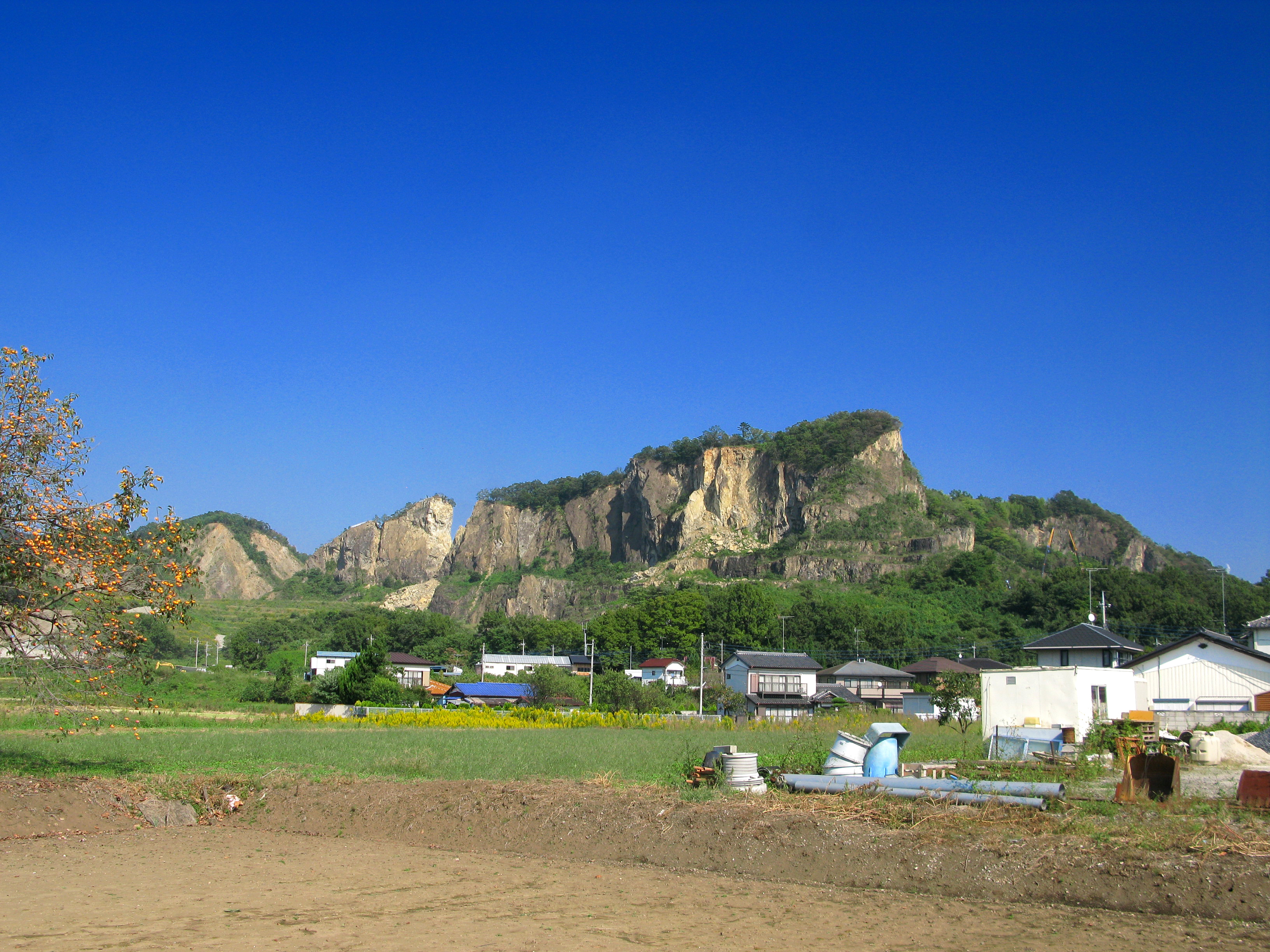
After partial collapse (October 2011)

Mount Iwafune (岩船山, Iwafunesan, Iwafuneyama) is a mountain located in Tochigi City, Tochigi Prefecture (formerly Iwafune Town), in Northern Kanto, with an elevation of 172.7 meters. It is the southernmost peak of the Ashio Mountains. The origin of the characters used in the name—"boat" (舟) for the stone quarried here and the former town name, and "ship" (船) for the mountain name—is unclear. The surrounding area is designated as a nature conservation area (designated on July 19, 1977), where the name is written as "岩舟山" (Iwafuneyama).

It has been a major sacred site, with Kōshō-ji Temple attracting the faith of people in the Eastern provinces. The mountain has a peculiar shape with steep cliffs, which has gradually changed due to quarrying of Iwafune stone since the Edo period. Since the late 1970s, the abandoned quarry site has been used for location shooting, including special effects scenes with explosions, taking advantage of its mystical landscape.

During the Great East Japan Earthquake in March 2011, the western peak collapsed in a V-shape, and another part of the mountainside crumbled from a height of about 140 meters (no casualties or damage to houses).

At the southeastern foot of the mountain is the site where Emperor Meiji once held an outdoor tea ceremony (nodate), and the surrounding area has been developed as Kabutoyama Park.

== Production of Iwafune stone ==
The mountain was quarried from the Edo period to the Shōwa period for foundation materials such as retaining stones (kenchi-ishi) and cut stones. Classified as a type of tuff (andesitic breccia tuff), it is also called "Southern Barbarian Stone." During the Edo period, it was transported via the Watarase River boat routes for use in castle, shrine, and temple construction across the Kantō region. In the Meiji era, the Iwafune Human-Powered Railway was established in 1900 for transport, followed by the Ministry of Home Affairs' light railway in 1916, which was also used for river improvement projects. The Ryōmō Line's Iwafune Station and Tobu Railway's Seiwa Station were also used for transportation. Initially, stones were lowered using sledges (shura), but due to safety concerns, horse-drawn carts gradually replaced them.

After World War II, transportation shifted to dump trucks, with up to 200 trucks operating daily. The blasting for quarrying and its warning sirens echoed through the town. At its peak around 1955, about 40 stone shops lined the area, but the industry declined in the 1960s with the rise of concrete. As of 2022, quarrying has ceased. Near the foot of the mountain at Iwafune Station, the Iwafune Stone Museum displays materials related to the stone. The museum building was constructed in 1931.

== Post-quarrying land use ==
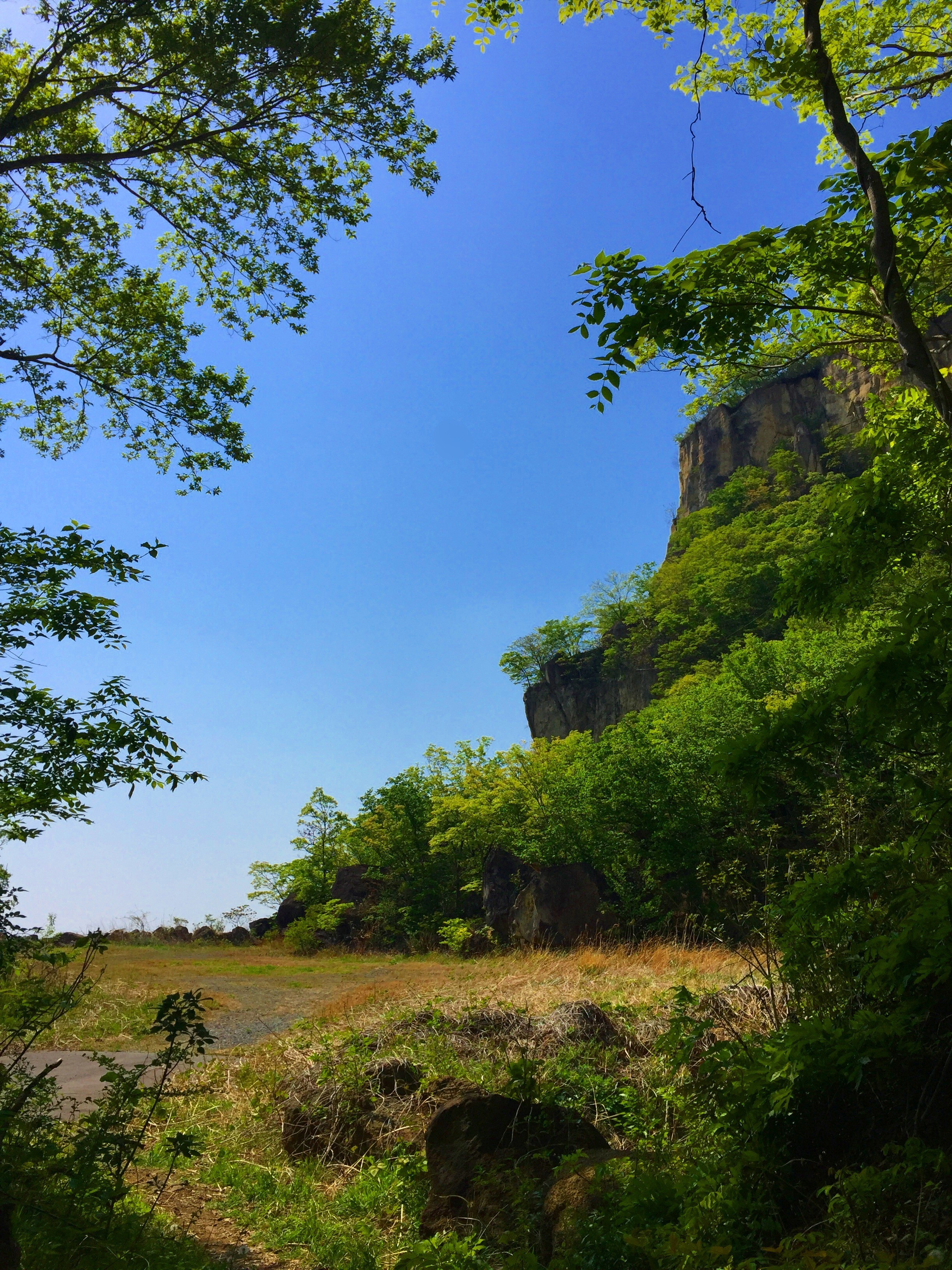
Abandoned quarry on Mount Iwafune

The abandoned quarry site on Mount Iwafune is one of the few remaining vast areas in the Greater Tokyo Area where explosive scenes using gunpowder can be filmed. It is frequently used as a filming location for period dramas, hero action scenes, and other special effects-heavy movies and TV dramas.

It is particularly well known as a filming site for the Super Sentai Series and, along with the anime film 5 Centimeters per Second by Makoto Shinkai (which features Iwafune as a setting), has become a "pilgrimage site" for fans of these works. Since 2000, the local NPO Iwafune Cliff Stage has hosted the outdoor concert Iwafune Cliff Stage almost annually as part of regional revitalization efforts. The name "Iwafune Cliff Stage" has also become a nickname for the quarry site itself.

The quarry's steep terrain is also used for music video shoots, cosplay photoshoots, and filming car crash scenes. Several spots are suitable for filming, with the Tatamioka Forestry Cooperative managing one location where the fee is ¥54,000 per day (as of 2018). When explosions are involved, notices are circulated to nearby residents as a courtesy.

Some couples even request explosion-backdrop wedding photos.

In May 2022, the "Iwafune Rope Jump" opened, allowing jumps from a 33-meter cliff.
