= Washinomiya Shrine =

Shinto shrine in Japan

Washinomiya Shrine 鷲宮神社
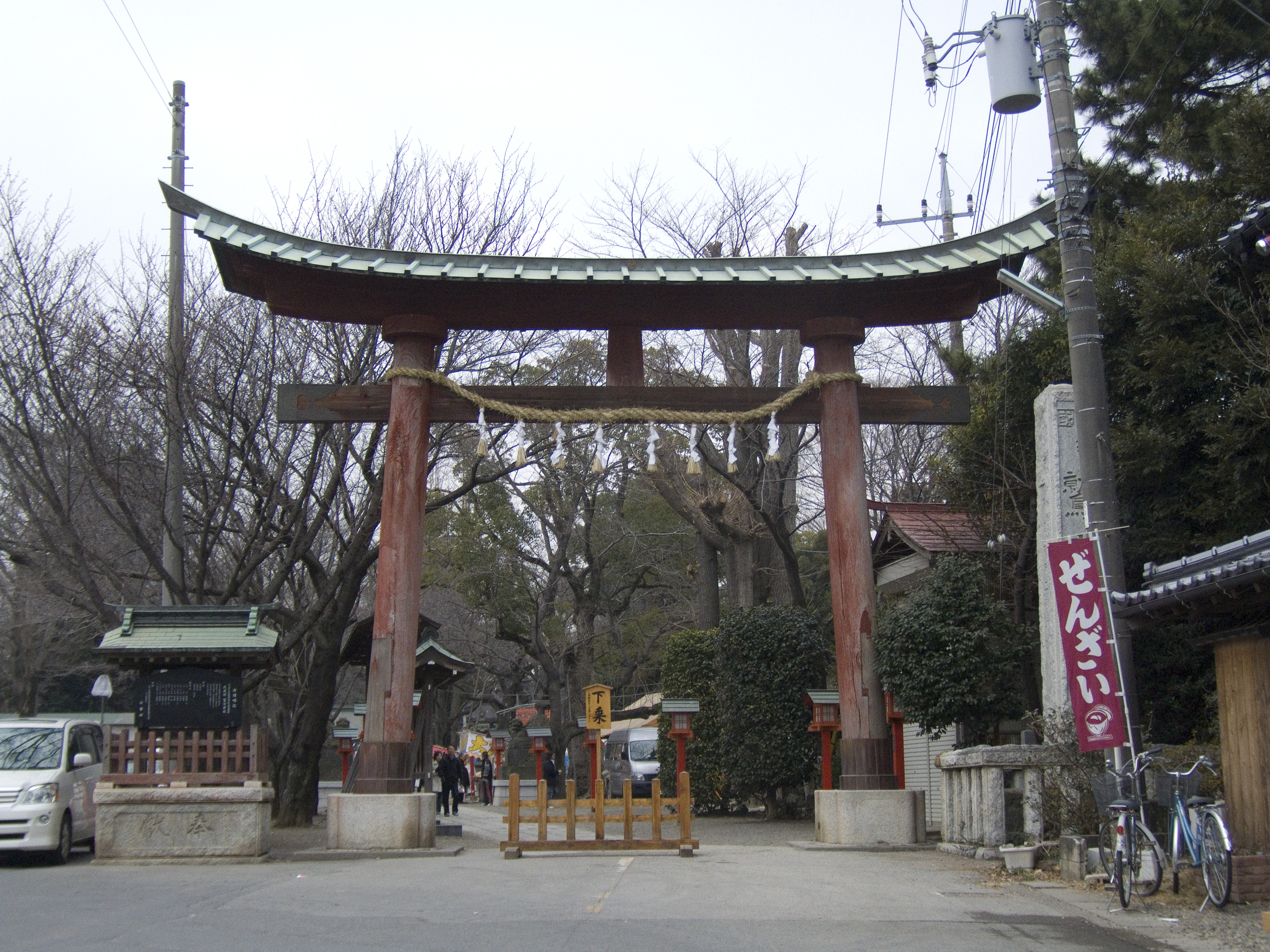
- Torii of the Washinomiya Shrine

- Location within Japan

Religion
- Affiliation: Shinto
- Deity: Takehiratorinomikoto

Location
- Location: Kuki, Saitama
- Interactive map of Washinomiya Shrine 鷲宮神社
- Coordinates: 36°5′59.7″N 139°39′17.7″E

Washinomiya Shrine (鷲宮神社, Washinomiya-jinja) is one of the oldest Shintō shrines in the Kantō region, located in Kuki, Saitama (formerly Washimiya), Japan.

== History ==
The oldest record of the shrine was found in the Azuma Kagami, the official historical record for the Kamakura Shogunate. It had the patronage of the Imperial family, and even Shōgun Tokugawa Ieyasu. Various folk-culture and performing art events, including the Saibara-Kagura Festival are held here. Its traditional dance handed down through generations has been designated as a national intangible folk-culture asset. Washinomiya's Hajisai festival involves a local parade and the carrying of a mikoshi. The shrine also houses several ancient relics.

During the New Year season, the shrine receives no fewer than 100,000 visitors.

The torii gate of the shrine collapsed in 2018 and was later replaced.

== Connections to Lucky Star ==
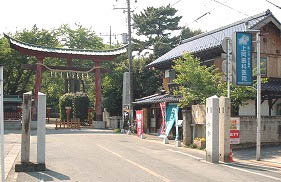
This shot is redrawn in the opening animation of the anime Lucky Star.

In its July 2007 issue, the magazine Newtype ran an article on the various locales featuring in the popular anime and manga Lucky Star, and provided directions on how to reach these places from the otaku hotspot Akihabara, including the Washinomiya Shrine which had its torii shown in the opening sequence and featured the Hiiragi sisters working as miko in the anime.

Shortly afterwards, massive otaku "pilgrimages" to the shrine became the most widely reported consequence of the feature's publication. It became a place teeming with photographers trying to replicate scenes from the anime, cosplayers wandering around, and prayer plaques ridden with anime drawings and strange prayers like "Konata is my wife".

The head of the shrine raised concerns that the visitors were worshipping "deities" other than the shrine's own. The locals were divided on the situation, with some suggesting that it was good for the shrine to have so many worshippers, and some being concerned about the town's security. The visiting otakus, although considered unusual, were generally described as being well-mannered. Eventually, many local residents embraced the otaku, with some profiting from the new traffic and influx of people. This social phenomenon was subsequently satirized in the twenty-first episode of the anime.

On December 2, 2007, Kagami Yoshimizu and 4 cast members of Lucky Star held a brunch and "official" visit of the shrine. A highlight of the visit was a guided tour by the voice actors of the "Hiiragi sisters" (Emiri Kato and Kaori Fukuhara) leading the other two VA's and fans around the real shrine.

In September 2008, Lucky Star fans were encouraged to participate in the local Hajisai festival, and with help from locals, produced and paraded a mikoshi themed around Lucky Star. Every year since, some Lucky Star fans travel to Kuki to help carry the Lucky Star mikoshi and help with the traditional mikoshi. It is a symbiotic relationship. Both mikoshi were also featured in the 2010 Shanghai Expo. Since 2018, the Lucky Star mikoshi now appears in the Yasaka summer festival every July.
