= Ema (Shinto) =

Wood plaque deposited in a Japanese temple to ask for a wish

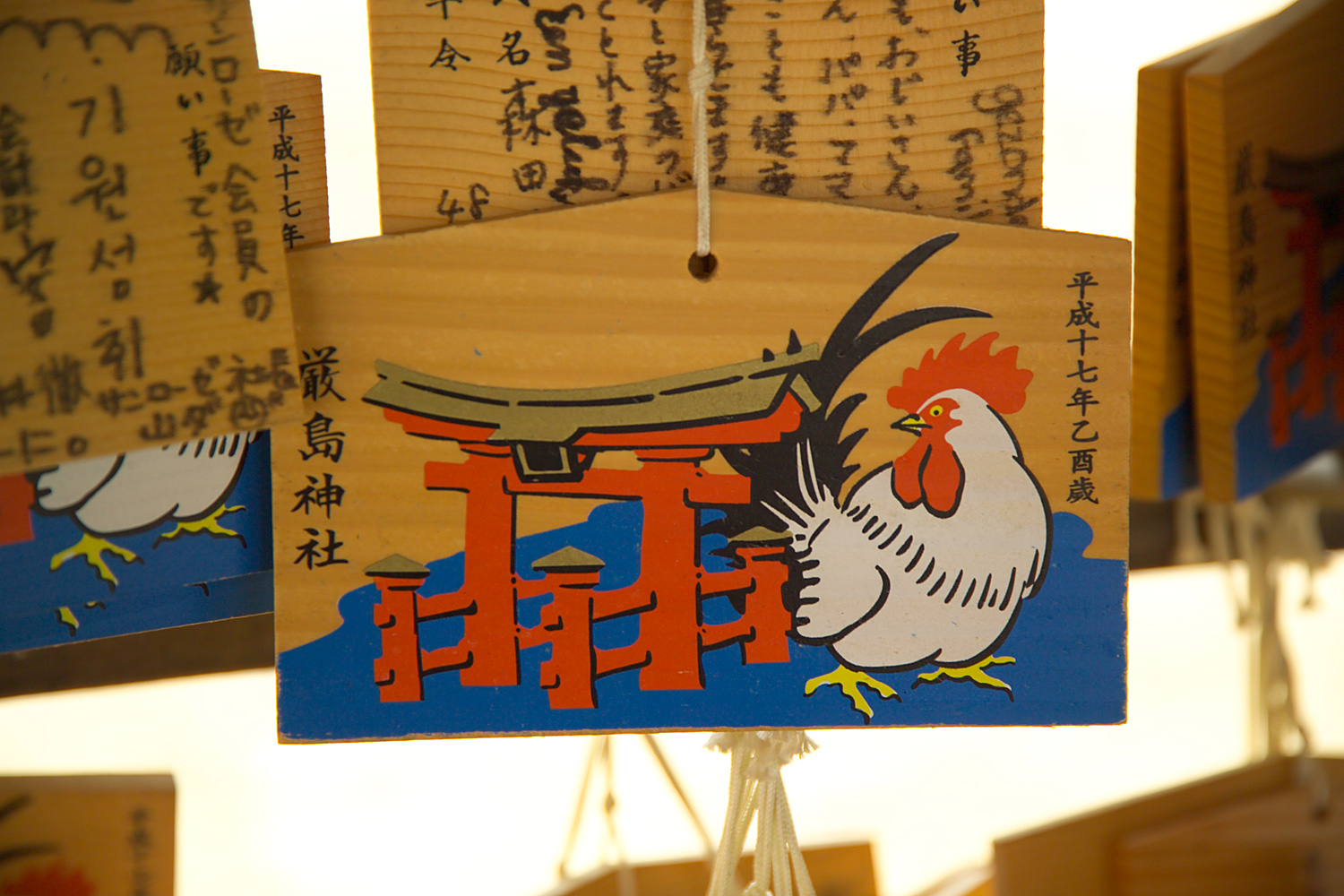
Ema at Itsukushima Shrine

Ema (絵馬, lit. 'picture-horse') are small wooden plaques, common to Japan, in which Shinto and Buddhist worshippers write prayers or wishes. Ema are left hanging up at the shrine, where the kami (spirits or gods) are believed to receive them. This is particularly evident at shrines such as at the Ikoma Shrine, where ema more often than usual indicate great despair or tragedy in one's life and show a heavy dependence on divine intervention. However, ema have been hung up for many other purposes, such as advertisements for certain Kabuki groups at shrines such as Naritasan Shinshôji in the Chiba prefecture. Typically 15 cm (5.9 in) wide and 9 cm (3.5 in) tall, they often carry images or are shaped like animals, or symbols from the zodiac, Shinto, or the particular shrine or temple. In ancient times, people would donate horses to the shrines for good favor; over time this was transferred to a wooden plaque with a picture of a horse, and later still to the various wooden plaques sold today for the same purpose. Once inscribed with a wish, ema are hung at the shrine until they are ritually burned at special events, symbolic of the liberation of the wish from the writer. Ema can be hung up either for one's personal benefit, or the benefit of another. There is no specified format for creating ema. Typically, one side has the wishes inscribed in text, and the other is left for imagery should it be desired.

== History ==
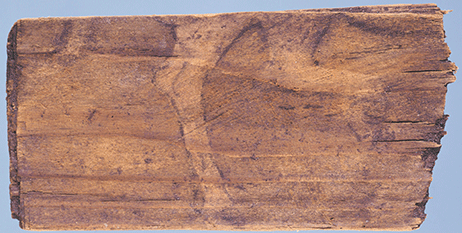
The oldest ema ever found in Japan, in Osaka

In some early Shinto and folk traditions of Japan, horses were seen as carrying messages from the kami, and were usually used to transmit requests during droughts or famines. Horses were extremely expensive, and figures made of clay or wood have been found dating to the Nara period. A living horse (shinme), offered in fulfillment of a vow, was considered an expression of gratitude to the kami; when offering a live horse was not possible, a wooden statue or painted wooden plaque could serve instead as a substitute effigy (katashiro) of a horse, believed to represent a primitive form of the ema itself. The earliest text record of a substitution is from the Honcho Bunsui from 1013, in which an offering of three paper horses is made at the Kitano Tenjin shrine. During the Kamakura period, the practice entered into Buddhist practice, as evidenced in painted scrolls of ema at Buddhist temples.

The depictions of objects aside from horses can be traced to either the Muromachi or Tokugawa periods, beginning with larger sized ema (named ōema, literally 'large ema') but also representing new forms, such as ships. Artists of this period, such as Hokusai, began to create ema in distinct styles, and creating the objects became a professionalized craft.

Today, they are mostly produced at or by the shrine or temple in which they are found. Some shrines have faced criticism for profiting from the sale of ema. In 1979, two shrines dedicated to education sold ema for examination success, transforming the funds into a scholarship in 1980 after public outcry.

Following a rise in popularity of pop-culture tourism in Japan, or more specifically Seichi Junrei (聖地巡礼, lit. 'pilgrimage to sacred places'), several otaku started a practice of hanging ita-ema (痛絵馬, lit. 'painful ema') (same first kanji as in itasha) featuring drawings of characters from popular manga and video game series. Oftentimes these are placed at shrines closely tied to a particular series either by set location or an official collaboration. Another hotspot for ita-ema is Kanda Shrine, due both to its proximity to Akihabara and its relationship with the Love Live! franchise. Some series rights-holders and collaborating shrines began selling branded ita-ema as official merchandise.

== Symbols ==
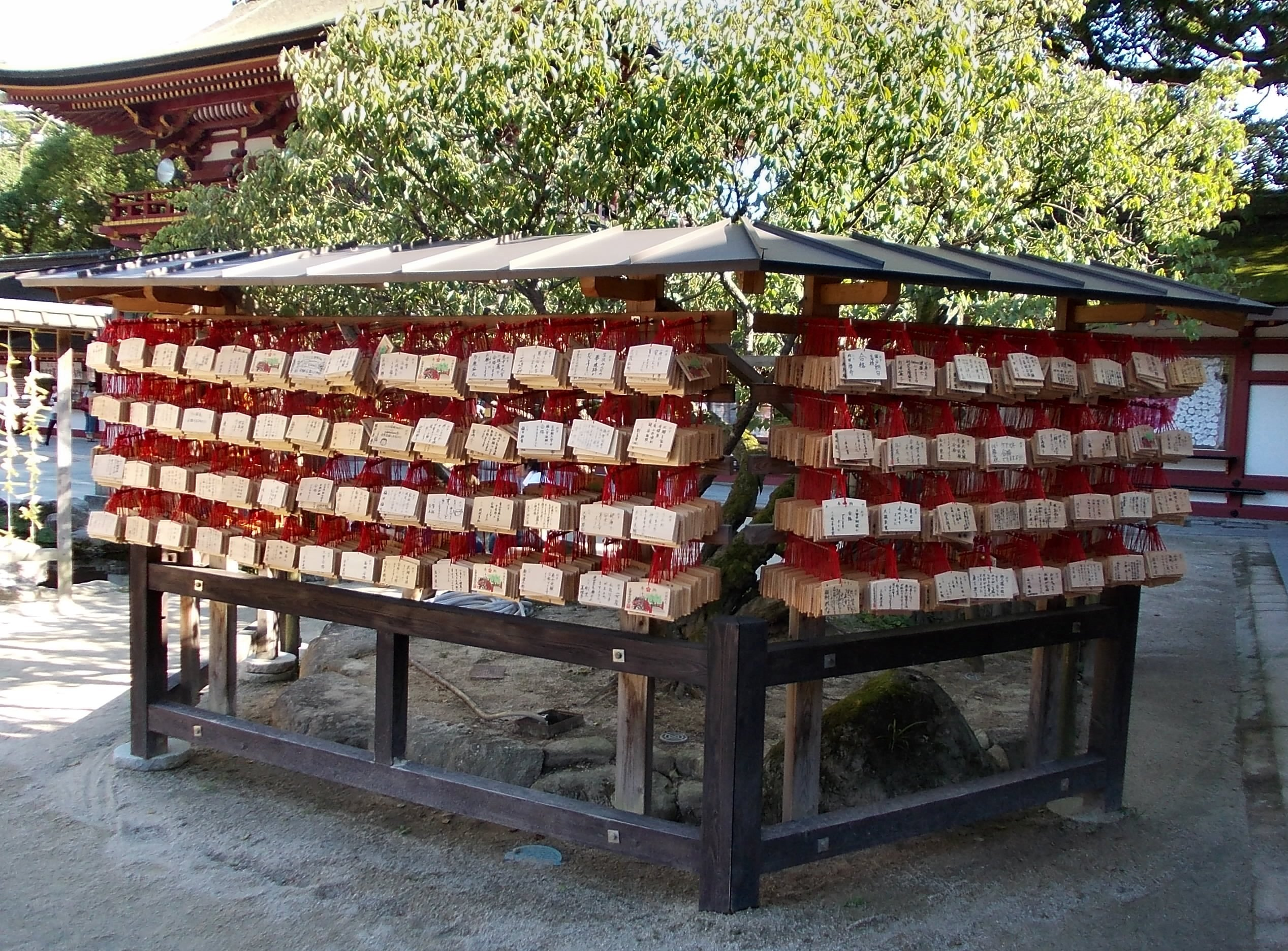
Ema on display at Dazaifu Tenmangu shrine in Fukuoka Prefecture

Historically, groups of farmers or small merchants could organize to hire a local artisan to create an ema to be donated to a shrine for a specific purpose, such as a good harvest. Archeological records suggest this could have been used to send political signals, as in the case of a Fukuoka Prefecture shrine that saw an increase in commissioned portraits depicting peaceful relations with Korea amidst tensions between the nations during the late 19th century.

Ema can represent deities, such as Kannon and Jizō, but also more specific iconography depending on their intended purpose. These include depictions of a phallus or breasts for fertility prayers, or an octopus representing the desire to be cured of warts. Another example are sandals depicted on plaques for foot remedies. Another form of ema wish is for "tie-cutting"; whereas a man and woman standing beside a palm tree is interpreted as a wish for a long relationship, another plaque depicts nettles between the couple, wishing for divorce. Common symbolism also includes nettles placed beside an object one wishes to sever ties with. During wartime, ema depicting the same man, one in military uniform and one in civilian clothing, suggested a desire for a soldier to sever from his civilian life. For some, the same image may have been used to express a wish to avoid military service altogether.

Another form of ema found particularly in the northeastern region of Japan, such as the Yamagata Prefecture, is the mukasari (ムカサリ) ema. Mukasari means "marriage" in the Yamagata dialect. This form of ema is typically in a larger format than other kinds and symbolizes marriage, typically after one of the parties has died. For example, there is one hanging in the Wakamatsu Kannon temple in Tendō City where a mother depicted her two sons who died in World War II with their brides in ceremonial dress.

The use of text has gradually replaced the overt use of symbolism in contemporary ema. The rise of literacy has encouraged guests to write their own messages, which has dramatically decreased the use of distinct ema as a way to transmit a specific wish.

== Function ==
As a ritual, the ema is a means to communicate wishes to both priests and the kami. The public nature of the ema, which are displayed at shrines before their ritual burning, also serves a social function for communicating to the community that an individual has made the wish. Burning the wishes helps to "symbolically liberate" the spirit of the wish into the world. In some cases, however, wishes are taken from the shrine to be hung at home, though still ritually burned in special ceremonies.

== See also ==
- Glossary of Shinto, for an explanation of terms concerning Japanese Shinto, Shinto art, and Shinto shrine architecture.
- Sangaku
