= Anime Tourism Association =

Japanese travel industry association

The Anime Tourism Association (アニメツーリズム協会, Anime tsūrizumu kyōkai), or ATA, is a general incorporated association (jp:一般社団法人) founded September 16, 2016, by Kadokawa alongside key members of Japan's travel industry and anime industry for the furthering of tourism motivated by anime and manga. The ATA operates out of Fujimi, Chiyoda, Tokyo, Japan. Its current president is famed mecha anime designer Shoji Kawamori, who succeeded Gundam creator Yoshiyuki Tomino on October 8, 2024.

The Anime Tourism Association is a public-private partnership that delivers information to overseas and domestic fans of Cool Japan content regarding relevant anime seichi (アニメ聖地, anime sacred places) in order to encourage and facilitate contents tourism.

== 88 Japanese Anime Spots ==
The Anime Tourism Association also intends to popularize and canonize certain anime-related destinations by selecting some for an annual list called the 88 Japanese Anime Spots (訪れてみたい日本のアニメ聖地88, Otozurete-mitai nihon no anime seichi 88). The first list was released in August 2017 as the 2018 Edition. Since anime tourism to actual locations featured as settings is often referred to as seichi junrei (聖地巡礼, lit. 'pilgrimage to sacred sites'), the number 88 was chosen in reference to the 88 stations of the Buddhist monk Kūkai's historic Shikoku Pilgrimage. The spots on the list are numbered from 1 to 88, and each spot is described and promoted on the Anime Tourism Association website.

Plaques and stamps are installed at the locations featured among the 88 Spots, marking them as "Animation Spots" and communicating their relation to the larger project.

- Stop "0" – Narita Airport Anime Tourism Association Information Center
- Stop 1 – Tokorozawa Sakura Town (formerly the KADOKAWA Fujimi Building)
- Stop 88 – Tokyo Metropolitan Government Building

=== Selection Criteria ===
The annual 88 spots are determined based on the results of a poll of domestic and international anime fans, internal consultations with series rights holders, local authorities, and other parties conducted by the association's Chief Secretary, and a judgement made by the board of directors based on the poll results. Candidates for the list are either actual sites assumed to have a certain level of recognition among fans as a setting or model, or official sites such as event centers and manga museums. In 2020, the poll received 80,000 responses, but in 2022, it only received 40,000 responses, which the Association attributed to the COVID-19 epidemic.

=== Selection Controversy ===
In 2017, the reveal of the first ever 88 Spots list for 2018 was met with some controversy over which series were included and excluded, and particularly concerns that some series that fans had voted for in the poll were not considered. These gaps in the list mostly applied to popular works from particular studios like Kyoto Animation, Studio Ghibli, and P.A. Works. Some fans, like seichi junrei blogger Micahel Vito, claimed that the ATA, an organization founded, funded, and staffed in large part by Kadokawa, seemed to have given preferential treatment to Kadokawa-related properties. Then-chairperson Tsuguhiko Kadokawa claimed these gaps in the final list were the result of issues obtaining clearance for inclusion from relevant Intellectual Property rights-holders, and that changes were made to avoid similar issues going forward.

== Organization ==
- President Shoji Kawamori
- Chairperson Kazuko Ishikawa (Association of Japanese Animations President)
- Vice Chairperson Shinichiro Inoue（KADOKAWA Executive Fellow）
- Managing Director & Chief Secretary Norimichi Suzuki
- Director Mastoshi Komori (Tokio Marine Nichido Senior Managing Director)
- Director Goro Kido（JTB Executive Officer）
- Director Shinichiro Shimizu (Japan Airlines Representative Director and Executive Vice President)
- Director Makoto Tanabe (Narita International Airport Representative Director and President)
- Director Shigetaka Murase (WILLER, Inc. CEO)
- Director Kisuke Murayama (Yamatogokoro Inc. Representative Director)
- Director and Executive Producer Yoshimasa Mori
- Auditor Keiichi Uezumi (Representative, Bizadvisors Inc. Tax Accountant Office)

== Mascot ==
The Anime Tourism Association unveiled an official chibi mascot called Junrei-chan, created in association with Hill Climb Studio, on October 29, 2018, during the announcement of the 2019 Japanese Anime 88-Spots. Junrei-chan is depicted wearing a pleated white dress, a chicken kigurumi hat, and sometimes holding a flag bearing the company logo like a tour guide. Junrei-chan appears on certain physical promotional materials at the Narita and Tokorozaka Sakura Town information centers, on the cover of the ATA's annual white paper, and as the ATA's Twitter profile picture. It has also acted as a tour guide in a VR experience designed in partnership with the ATA, Alpha Code Inc., Hyouka, and Hida Takayama for the 2020 Kyoto International Manga Anime Fair. The character is voiced by Yūko Ōno.

== Anime Tourism Summit ==
The Anime Tourism Summit is an event hosted by the Anime Tourism Association to examine the potential of contents tourism to increase overseas tourism to Japan. Local authorities actively working to attract tourists through anime featuring their jurisdiction, and representatives and creatives behind animation production companies take the stage to discuss the current status and issues of anime tourism, future prospects, and cooperation between content producers and municipalities.

It was held for the first time on December 1, 2019, in Kitakyushu, which has been certified by the ATA as an anime spot.

== Unique Experience Japan ==
In 2019, the Anime Tourism Association started a collaboration with the private tour company Otomo to offer guided anime spot tours, starting October 1, 2019. The tour options included trips to places relating to The Melancholy of Haruhi Suzumiya in Nishinomiya, Hyōgo Prefecture, and Hyouka in Takayama, Gifu Prefecture. Otomo, inc. announced the beginning of bankruptcy proceedings on June 16, 2020.
