= Association of Film Commissioners International =

Film commission

- Trade name: AFCI
- Formerly: Association of Film Commissioners
- Company type: Film Commission
- Founded: 1975; United States
- Headquarters: Los Angeles
- Number of locations: International
- Area served: Worldwide
- Website: afci.org

Association of Film Commissioners International (AFCI) is worldwide network of more than 360 commissions from 40 countries on every continent except Antarctica. The AFCI represents trained, experienced and professional Film Commissioners and their offices and staff, sets standards and provides professional education, offers training and business services in the field of Film Commissioning, and provides regular marketing and network opportunities in Hollywood and around the world for Film Commissions.

== History ==
The Association of Film Commissioners (AFC) was founded in 1975 to serve the growing needs of on-location film and television production. Originally, the AFC was formed by a small group of film commissioners who wanted to share information and learn from one another's experiences. The AFC incorporated in Washington, D.C. in 1983. Following an increase in international membership, in 1988, the organisation changed their name to the Association of Film Commissioners International. Since then, the AFCI has expanded into a worldwide network of more than 360 commissions from 40 countries on every continent except Antarctica.

== Members ==
Members of the AFCI are Film Commissions from around the world. A film commission is a purpose-built organization or department set up by an interested city, county, state / province or federal government with the specific mandate of promoting and developing filming activity within the jurisdiction. The primary goal of any film commission is to attract film and video production to an area in order to accrue locally realized benefits from hiring local crews and talent, renting local equipment, using hotel rooms, rental cars, catering services, or any number of goods and services supplied on location. In other words, Film Offices attract Film & TV productions to their locations, and then ensure that the location capitalizes on that production activity.

Member Film Commissions have typically been established by cities, counties, states / provinces or federal governments, and are generally operated and funded by various agencies of government, such as the governor's office, the mayor's office, chambers of commerce, convention and visitors’ bureaus, tourism offices and business and economic development departments.

== Member Snap Shot ==
AFCI Region:

61.7%: US

14.1%: Europe

10.9%: Asia/Oceana

9.4%: Canada

3.9%: Africa/Latin America

Years in Existence:

25.8%: 1–5 years

20.3%: 6–10 years

14.8%: 11–15 years

16.4%: 16–20 years

7.0%: 21–25 years

15.6%: over 25 years

Jurisdiction:

42.2%: County/Region

26.6%: State/Province

25.0%: City

6.3%: Country

Type of Structure:

57.8%: Government

42.2%: non-profit Corp.

Agency within:

45.8%: Economic Dev.

18.1%: Tourism

11.1%: Arts/Culture

8.3%: Other

8.3%: Elected Official

5.6%: Stand Alone

2.8%: Community Dev.

How Governed:

38.6%: Gov. Official/Office

37.0%: Board of Directors

11.8%: Commission

6.3%: Advisory Board

3.9%: Other

2.4%: Volunteer

Funding Sources:

56.3%: City/Council Gov’t

31.3%: State/Provincial Government

14.1%: Chamber of Commerce/CVB

13.3%: Hotel/Motel Tax

12.5%: Fundraising

12.5%: Corp. Sponsors

9.4%: Private Funds

9.4%: Membership Fees

Operating Budget:

37.5%: up to $50K US

37.5%: $50 – $150K US

9.4%: $150 – $250K US

4.7%: $250 – $400K US

10.9%: $400K+ US

Yrs. Director Held Position:

66.4%: 1–5 years

13.3%: 6–10 years

9.4%: 11–15 years

7.0%: 16–20 years

3.9%: 20+ years

Full-time Employees:

16.4%: 0

53.1%: 1-2

21.1%: 3-5

7.0%: 6-9

2.3%: 10+

Prior Experience of Director:

43.8%: Entertainment Ind.

21.1%: Film Commission

20.3%: Government

19.5%: Tourism

16.4%: Other

14.8%: Business/Admin.

11.7%: Journalism

Additional Offices?

90.6%: No

9.4%: Yes

== Criteria for AFCI Membership ==
In order to be considered "qualified", Film Commissions must meet the following standards.

- Be endorsed and supported as the film commission for a defined geographic area, by the respective national, state, provincial or local government.
- Provide core services without fee.
- Avoid conflicts of interest between the official duties and services of the film commission office and the private financial interests of the film commissioner and film commission employees.
- Provide full film liaison and location services, and location scouting upon request.
- Provide service and support from the initial contact to the close of production, including on-call problem solving.
- Act as liaison between the Industry and all levels and units of government.
- Complete an AFCI training program within eighteen (18) months of the approval of interim membership for new Member film offices.

== AFCI Locations Show ==
In 1985, the AFCI partnered with the American Film Marketing Association to host Location Expo, the first on-location trade show for film and television production. Film Commissions from around the world gathered to promote their locations and services to American producers. The first Location Expo attracted 60 film commissioners and some 1,200 people from the film industry to a Los Angeles exhibition site. During the next four years, the Expo's space demands increased so that by 1990 the show had to be held at a site different from the AFM conference. Attendance tripled. Then in 1991, Expo relocated with the AFM to Santa Monica. The annual trade show, now an AFCI-sponsored event and known as the AFCI Global Finance and Locations Show, soon became too large to be held in conjunction with AFM, moved its event to early spring, and welcomes over 200+ film commissions and commercial affiliates exhibiting their services to more than 3,000 delegates.

The AFCI has been a sponsor of the Location Managers Guild Awards since their inaugural event in 2014, which is currently scheduled to coincide with the AFCI Location Show to take advantage of the number of film commissioners and international location professionals attending the show. A representative of the AFCI has typically been the presenter for the award for best film commission.

== Cineposium ==
Cineposium is an educational and networking event for film commissions first held in Cincinnati in 1976. A program of educational seminars, it is designed to teach film commissioners about the management and processes of the film commission business. Cineposium '88, held in Toronto, Canada, was the first one to be held outside the United States. The event rotates among its active members, with recent locations including Jecheon (2013), New York (2014), Barcelona (2015), Atlanta (2016) and Los Angeles (2017). The 2025 Cineposium, held during the 50th anniversary of the AFCI was, like the first Cineposium, held in Cincinnati.

The AFCI also participates in a number of other film festivals and markets, sponsoring panels and events at the American Film Market, Berlinale, Busan Film Festival, Festival de Cannes, and Sundance Film Festival.

== AFCI Training ==
AFCI offers multiple levels of training to members and non-members. From the entry level Film Commission Fundamentals online class to Master Classes and the Certified Film Commissioner program, AFCI members are the best trained in the world. AFCI also provides a variety of networking opportunities so members can market their local jurisdictions, educate themselves and their staff on cutting-edge production trends that impact filming on location.
