= Grjótagjá =

Cave filled with geothermally heated water in Iceland

Coordinates: 65°37′48.8″N 16°52′46.35″W

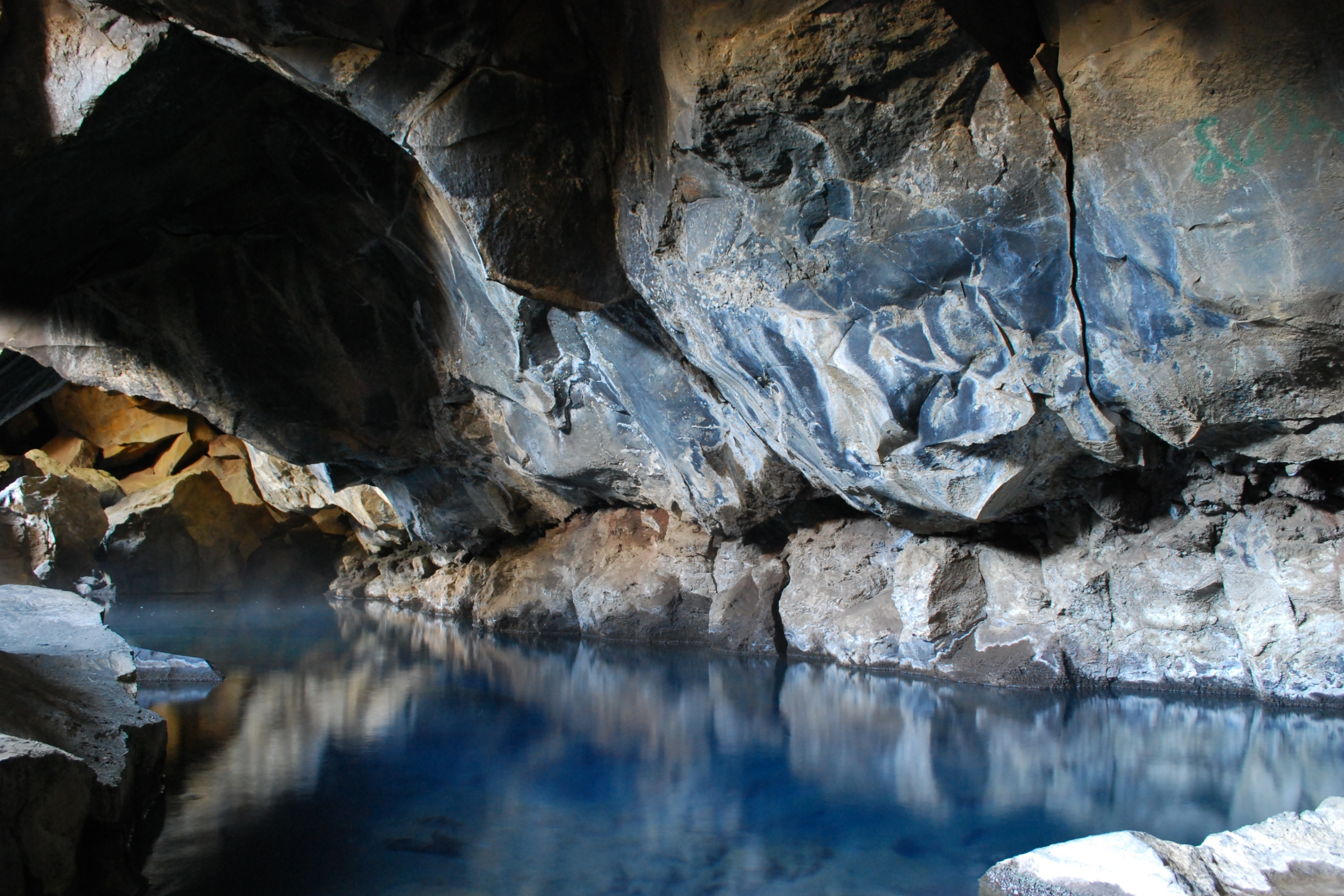
Grjótagjá cave in summer 2009

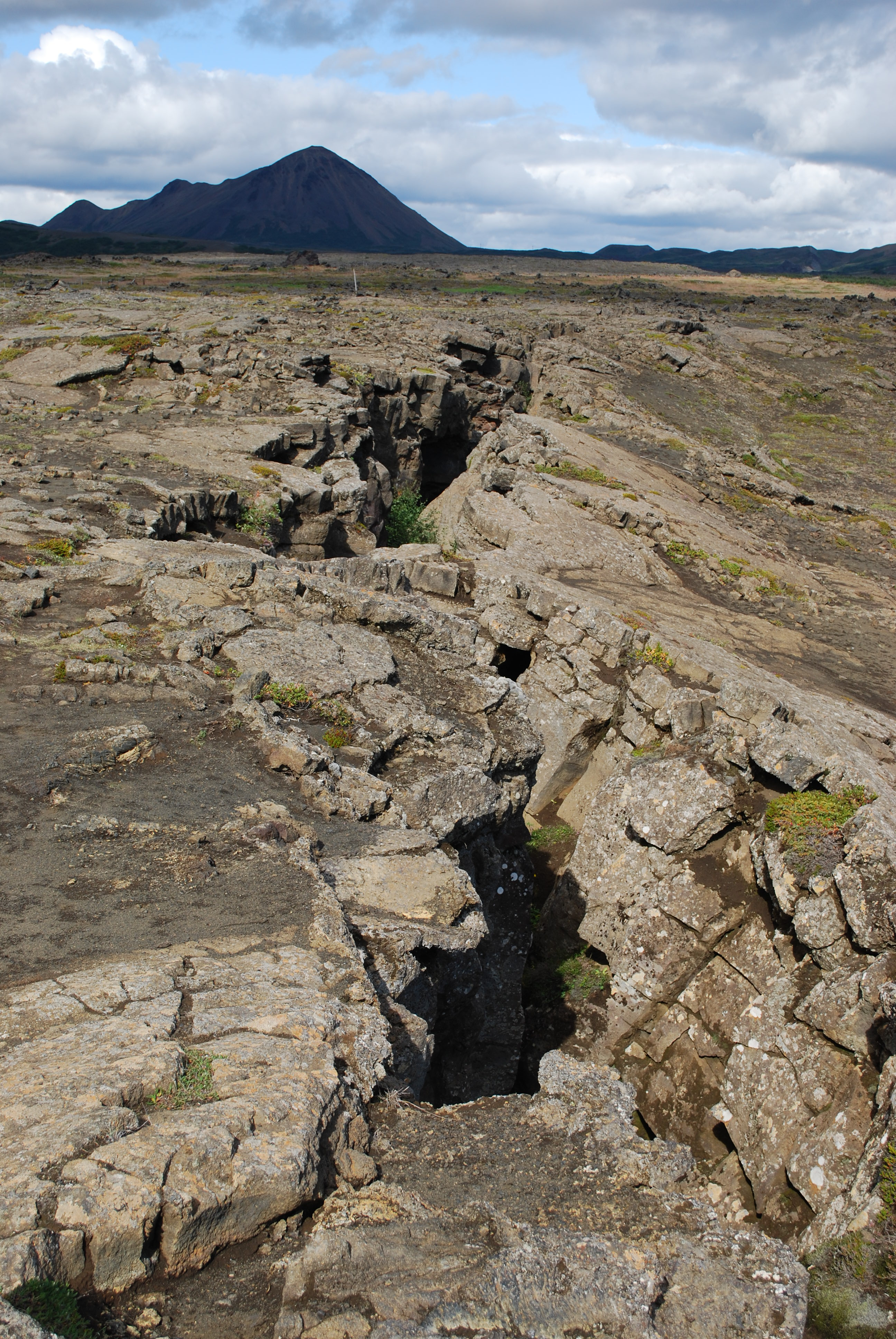
Landscape above Grjótagjá cave

Grjótagjá (Icelandic pronunciation: [ˈkrjouːtaˌcauː]) is a small lava cave near lake Mývatn in Iceland. It has a thermal spring inside.

In early 18th century the outlaw Jón Markússon lived there and used the cave for bathing. Until the 1970s Grjótagjá was a popular bathing site. But during the eruptions from 1975 to 1984 the temperature of the water rose to more than 50 °C (122 °F), though the temperature is slowly decreasing and has fallen below 50 °C again. The nearby lava cave of Stóragjá is being used as an alternative bathing site.

Grjótagjá was used as a location for filming the fifth episode of the third season of Game of Thrones, called "Kissed by Fire".
