= Pop-culture tourism =

Travel to locations featured in popular media

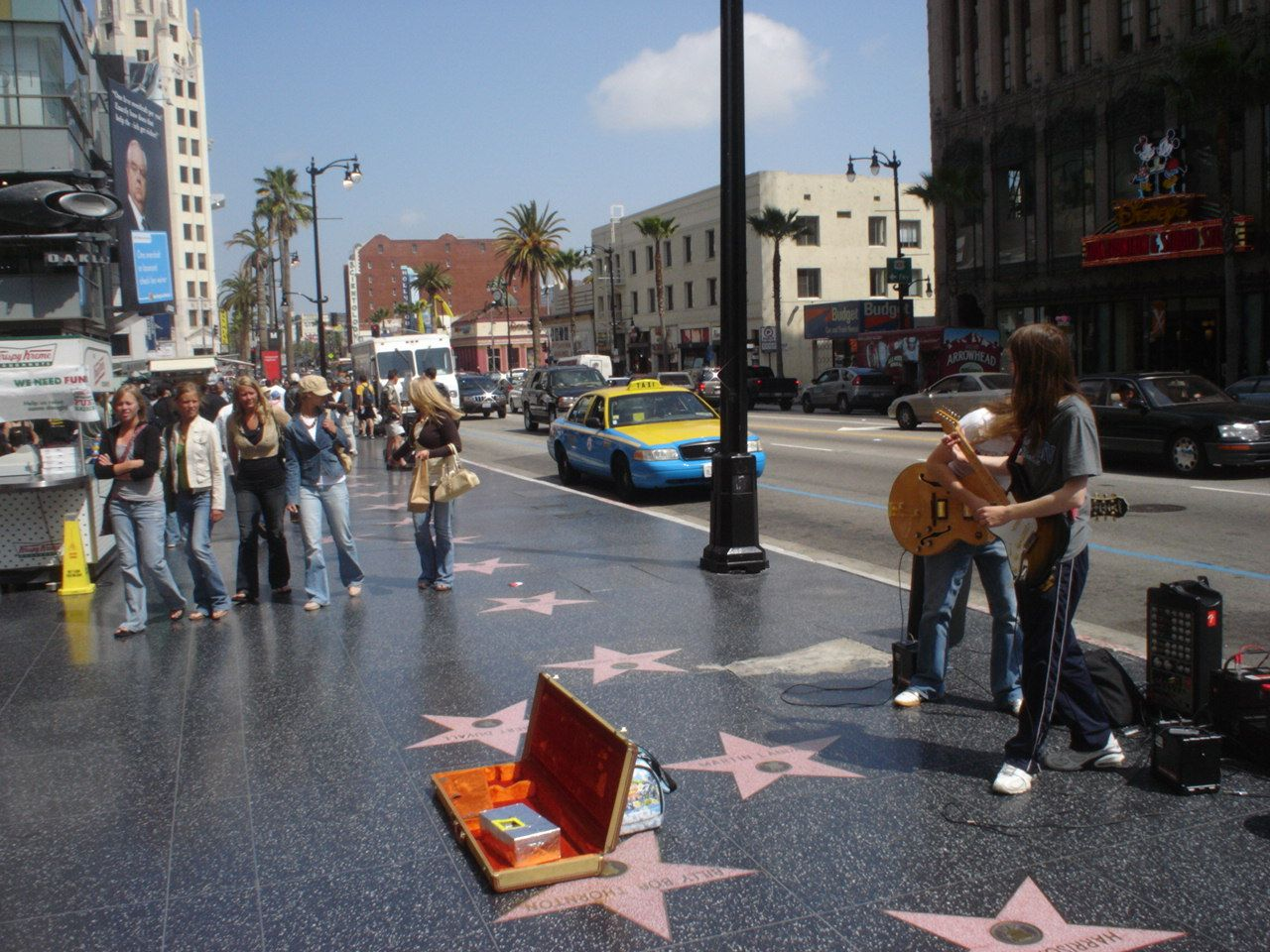
The Hollywood Walk of Fame, a popular culture attraction, with nearly 10 million visitors annually by 2010 estimation.

Pop-culture tourism is the act of traveling to locations featured in popular literature, film, music, or any other form of media. Also referred to as a "Location Vacation".

Pop-culture tourism is in some respects akin to pilgrimage, with its modern equivalents of places of pilgrimage, such as Elvis Presley's Graceland and the grave of Jim Morrison in Père Lachaise Cemetery.

== Locations ==
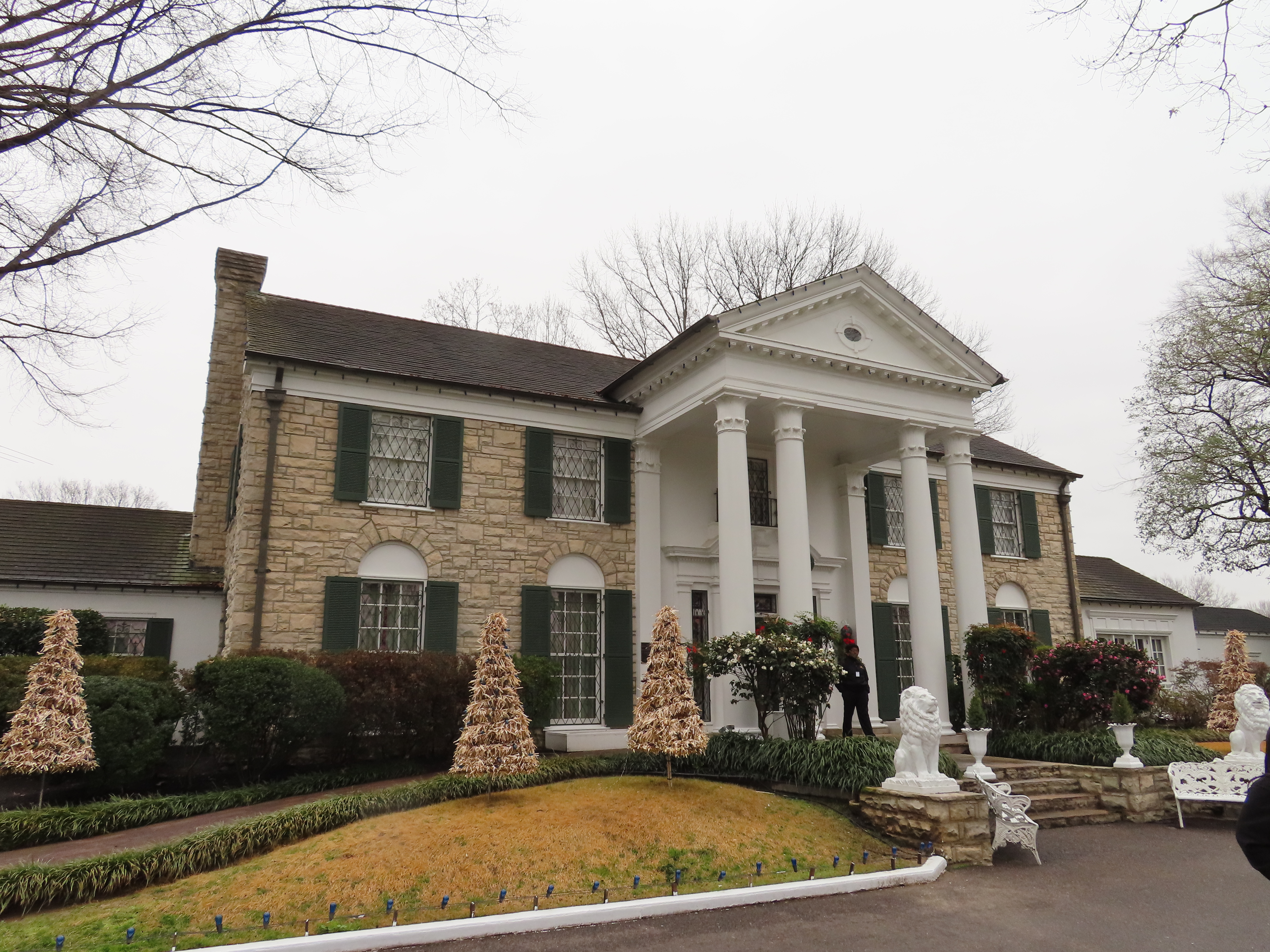
Elvis Presley's Graceland, second-most visited museum/house in the United States, it is also listed by NRHP and NHL—the first in music history

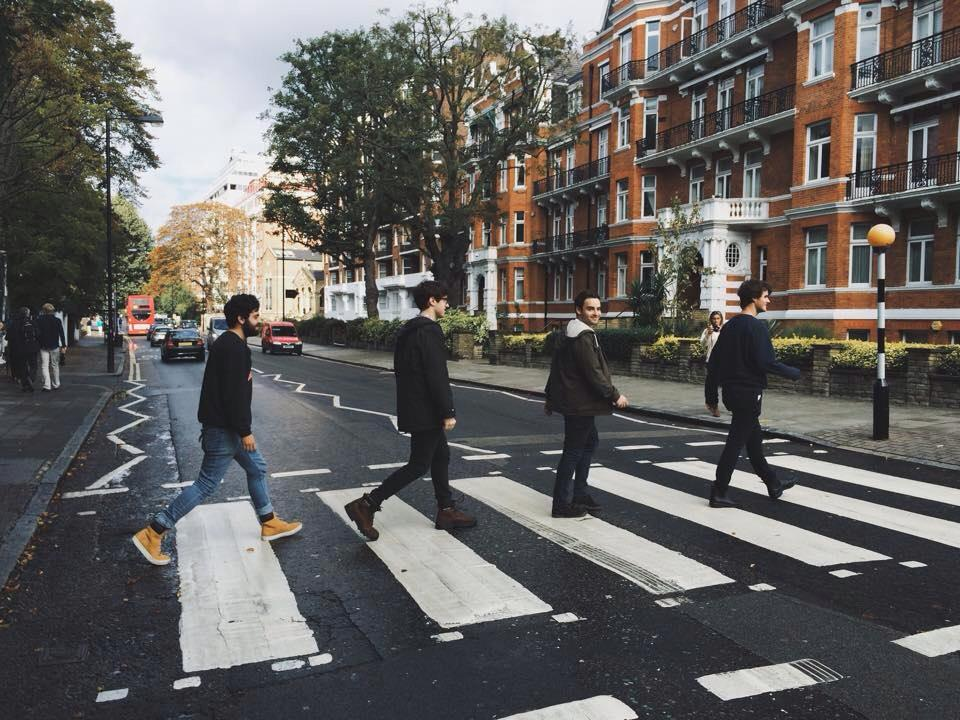
Abbey Road zebra crossing, famous for featuring on the cover of the Beatles' album of the same name—one of the most imitated photos in the world.

Popular destinations have included:

- Petra, Jordan, where visits went from the thousands to the millions after the climactic scene of the 1989 film Indiana Jones and the Last Crusade was filmed in Al Khazneh.
- Stratford-upon-Avon, Warwickshire, England, birthplace of William Shakespeare (1564–1616), receives about 4.9 million visitors a year from all over the world.
- Wimpstone, Warwickshire, England, where the original series of the BBC children's program Teletubbies was shot (1997–2001)
- Enoshima (Shōnan) and Kamakura district, originally a local tourist spot near Tokyo. Many Japanese anime and manga series, such as Ping Pong (1996), Squid Girl (2007–2016), Tsuritama (2012), Tari Tari (2012), and one-off episodes in other series, took place there. Due to appearance in the opening theme of the 1990s anime series Slam Dunk, an ordinary level crossing of the Enoshima Electric Railway, near Kamakurakōkōmae Station, became a popular attraction for tourists, notably from China and Taiwan.
- Civita di Bagnoregio, Italy, reported inspiration for the titular location of Castle in the Sky
- Matamata, New Zealand, is the location of The Shire and Hobbiton in Peter Jackson's Lord of the Rings movie trilogy
- Dubrovnik, Croatia, is the location of King's Landing in the Game of Thrones TV series
- The former home of Beatrix Potter, popular children's author, is now a museum open to tourists in Near and Far Sawrey, England
- The Hunger Games film series was filmed in multiple locations in North Carolina, including the Henry River Mill Village, which housed the Mellark family bakery and the Everdeens’ shanty, and the DuPont State Recreational Forest, where some scenes from the arena were filmed.
- Forks, Washington, the setting of Stephenie Meyer's Twilight series.
- The crosswalk outside Abbey Road Studios in London is a popular destination for fans of the Beatles, who were photographed using the crossing for the cover of their 1969 album Abbey Road.

== See also ==
- Film tourism, a specific form of pop-culture tourism
- Seichi Junrei, pop-culture tourism for Otaku-related media
- Grand Tour
- Film commission, non-profit, public organizations that attract motion media production crews to shoot on location in their respective localities.
- Overtourism
