= Film tourism =

Tourism connected with film appearances

Film tourism, sometimes called film-induced tourism, set-jetting, or location-vacation, is a specialized or niche form of tourism in which visitors explore locations and destinations connected with films and television series, tour production studios, or visit media-related theme parks.

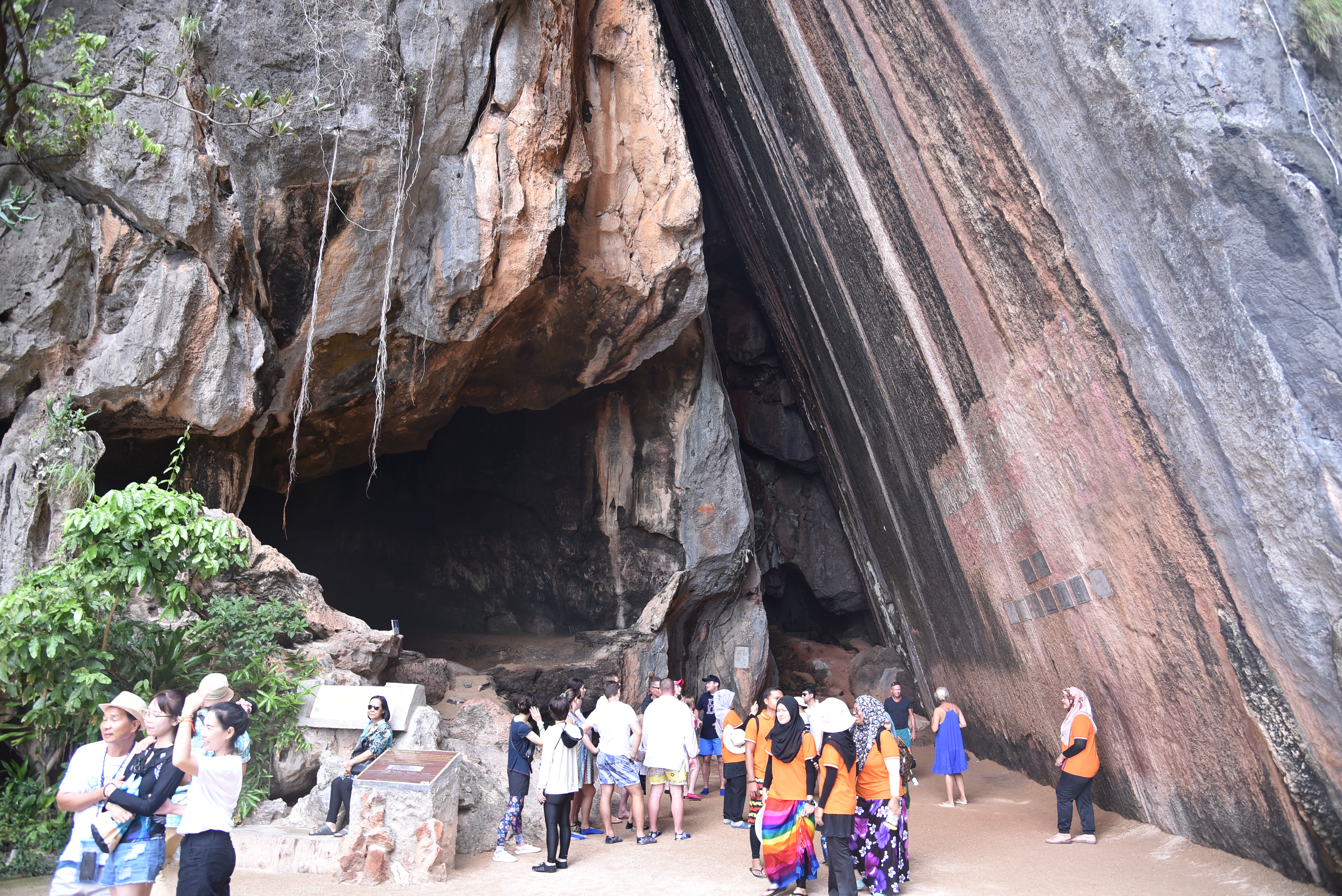
Tourists on a "James Bond tour" of Khao Phing Kan island in Thailand, visiting a filming location of the 1974 film The Man with the Golden Gun

The term set-jetting, referring to the trend of traveling to destinations that were filming locations, was the headline of a 2007 New York Post article on the subject by Gretchen Kelly. It has become one of the biggest trends in travel.

Examples include touring London in a high-speed boat as in the James Bond films, or visiting the stately homes that are seen in the Jane Austen adaptations. The term is a play on jet-setting, a form of luxury travel in upper-class society.

== Overview ==
Film-induced tourism is one of the fastest-growing sectors in tourism currently. It emerged as a prominent form of tourism in the 1990s. Before its emergence as a unique driver of the tourism industry, there were brief mentions of the phenomenon of film tourism by academics and anecdotal mentions.

In 1996, the British Tourism Association became the first tourism agency to capitalize on film tourism by publishing a map of Great Britain with movie locations marked on it.

This increasing popularity of film tourism is due to the rise of international travel, the rapid growth of the entertainment industry, and cult-like celebrity status.

For destinations, films provide long-term tourism revenue. The appearance of a particular area in a film or television can have a huge effect on the number of visitors of an already existing place and create a new kind of tourism to the area and generate a boost for the local economy. On average, a film can increase tourism and revenue by almost 31%.

In New Zealand, fans of The Lord of The Rings movie series visit New Zealand, where most of the movie scenes were shot. The movies increased the annual tourist influx to New Zealand from US$1.7 billion in 2000 to US$2.4 billion in 2004, a 40 percent surge.

In Britain, the Alnwick Castle, where the scenes for the movie Harry Potter were shot, had experienced a 120% increase in visitor numbers which brought an estimated £9 million worth tourist revenue to the area. One of the most prominent examples of film-induced demand is London King's Cross railway station, which was made famous for featuring a fictional section known as platform 9 3/4 in the Harry Potter movie series, first appearing in Harry Potter and the Philosopher's Stone. This fictional location was made into a real attraction in order to entice tourists to visit the train station, and a Harry Potter souvenir shop was constructed to capitalise on the increased interest in the series and the station.

Several regression analyses suggest a high correlation between destinations taking a proactive approach in order to encourage producers/studios to film at their location, and the tourism success in the area after the release of the movie. This is consistent with induced demand theory. When the supply increases, in the form of media exposure to areas that were not regarded as tourist hotspots, the number of visitors increases, even though the majority of these new visitors would not have necessarily visited these areas previously. This is exemplified by a Travelsat Competitive Index study that indicated that in 2017 alone, approximately 80 million tourists made the decision to travel to a destination based primarily on its feature in a television series or film. This figure has doubled since 2015.

An analysis of the use of Geospatial technologies in set jetting was proposed by Thierry Joliveau in The Cartographic Journal. Corporations, convention and tourism boards followed the trend that year, creating their own set-jetting travel maps, like the Elizabeth: The Golden Age movie map published by VisitBritain.

In June 2018, Maya Beach, made famous by Danny Boyle's 2000 film The Beach, was closed indefinitely to allow it to recover from the ecological damage of mass tourism, having received up to 200 boats and 5,000 tourists daily. It has since reopened with restrictions: visitors may wade knee-deep in the water but are not allowed to swim. These measures aim to protect the marine life and eco-system.

== Locations ==
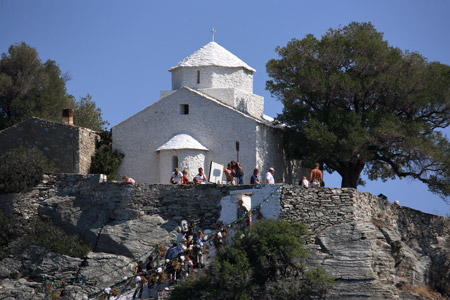
Agios Ioannis chapel, wedding scene from the filming of Mamma Mia! on Skopelos

Notable movie and television series filming locations that have become popular tourist destinations because of that include:

Movie/ TV series	Location	City or country
The Lord of the Rings		New Zealand
Braveheart	Wallace Monument	Scotland
The Fault in Our Stars (film)	a wooden bench on the Leidsegracht	The Netherlands
Harry Potter	Alnwick Castle, others	UK
Pride and Prejudice	Lyme Park	England
The Beach		Thailand
Sex and the City		New York, United States
Game of Thrones		Northern Ireland, Iceland, Dubrovnik
Game of Thrones	Dimmuborgir; Mývatn; Grjótagjá; Reynisfjara	Iceland
The Hangover		Las Vegas, United States
Downton Abbey	Bampton	UK
Broadchurch	West Bay	UK
Lost in Translation		Tokyo, Japan
Mamma Mia!	Skopelos	Greece
Indiana Jones and the Last Crusade	Petra	Jordan
The Sound of Music		Salzburg, Austria
The Talented Mr. Ripley	Ischia	Italy
Monty Python and the Holy Grail	Doune Castle	Scotland
Star Wars Episode IV: A New Hope	Hotel Sidi Driss	Tunisia
The Dark Knight Rises	Mehrangarh Fort	Jodhpur, India
The Godfather		Sicily, Italy
Joker	Joker Stairs	New York City
Zorba the Greek	Crete	Greece
Captain Corelli's Mandolin	Cephalonia	Greece
Never on Sunday	Piraeus	Greece

== See also ==
- Literary tourism
- Pop-culture tourism
