= Revitalization movement =

In 1956, Anthony F. C. Wallace published a paper called "Revitalization Movements" to describe how cultures change themselves. A revitalization movement is a "deliberate, organized, conscious effort by members of a society to construct a more satisfying culture" (p. 265), and Wallace describes at length the processes by which a revitalization movement takes place.

== Overview ==
Wallace's model 1956 describes the process of a revitalization movement. It is derived from studies of a Native American religious movement, The Code of Handsome Lake, which may have led to the formation of the Longhouse Religion.

- I. Period of generally satisfactory adaptation to a group's social and natural environment.
- II. Period of increased individual stress. While the group as a whole is able to survive through its accustomed cultural behavior, changes in the social or natural environment frustrate efforts of many people to obtain normal satisfactions of their needs.
- III. Period of cultural distortion. Changes in the group's social or natural environment drastically reduce the capacity of accustomed cultural behavior to satisfy most persons' physical and emotional needs.
- IV. Period of revitalization: (1) reformulation of the cultural pattern; (2) its communication; (3) organization of a reformulated cultural pattern; (4) adaptation of the reformulated pattern to better meet the needs and preferences of the group; (5) cultural transformation; (6) routinization, when the adapted reformulated cultural pattern becomes the standard cultural behavior for the group.
- V. New period of generally satisfactory adaptation to the group's changed social and/or natural environment.

Wallace derived his theory from studies of so-called primitive peoples (preliterate and homogeneous), with particular attention to the Iroquois revitalization movement led by Seneca religious leader and prophet Handsome Lake (1735-1815). Wallace believed that his revitalization model applies to movements as broad and complex as the rise of Christianity, Islam, Buddhism, or Wesleyan Methodism.

Revitalization is a part of social movements.

Scholars such as Vittorio Lanternari (1963), Peter Worsley (1968) and Duane Champagne (1988, 2005) have developed and adapted Wallace's insights.

== See also ==
- Ghost Dance, a famous Native American revitalization movement
- Great Awakenings, a series of Christian revitalization movements in the USA
- Christian revivalism
- Language revitalization
