= Film commission =

Government commission to promote filmmaking

Film commissions are quasi-governmental, non-profit, public organizations that attract motion media production crews (including movies, television, and commercials) to shoot on location in their respective localities, and offer support so that productions can accomplish their work smoothly.

== Introduction ==
Over 1000 such organizations are active in over 100 countries around the world, mostly in the United States, Europe and Asia. Many of them are organized by local government bodies together with not-for-profit organisations and the like, and serve as the administrative window concerned with attracting and supporting the productions that come to their locality, not only from other parts of their own countries, but from abroad, as well. The Association of Film Commissioners International or AFCI is based in Los Angeles. The mission of the AFCI is to be essential to the advancement and promotion of excellence in the global production of media on location, in an ethical and professional manner, and to this end the organization sets standards and provides professional education, training and business services in the field of Film Commissioning.

The European Film Commissions Network or EUFCN www.eufcn.com is based in Bruxelles. The Asian Film Commissions Network or AFCNet www.afcnet.org gathers now film commissions on the Asian continent.

A major industry event and trade show is the Locations Trade Show which is organised by the AFCI. In 2011 the Locations Show was produced in association with the Producers' Guild of America's Produced By Conference.

Film commissions believe that by attracting productions to their area they can provide direct economic benefit through rental of hotel rooms, locations, vehicles, etc., and indirect economic benefit via the increased exposure of appearing in films and television.

== History ==
"The first Commission was formed in the United States during the late 1940s. This was in response to the need for film companies to have a local government liaison who could coordinate local services such as police, state troopers and highway patrols, road and highway departments, fire departments, park rangers and all of the other essential municipal and government services for shooting a production on location. As more production companies began to look beyond the limits of a regular production center for realistic and varied locations, more cities and states began to see the need for production coordination liaison. The first government-sanctioned Film Commission was formed in Colorado in 1969, where Karol Smith became the first official film commissioner. "

== Economics ==
Film commissions can benefit both the production company and the area they decide to shoot at. The production company can potentially save money by shooting out of state and hiring cheaper below-the-line labor, shooting on location as opposed to building a set in a studio, etc. The economy at the location they shoot at can benefit via profits from hotel rooms, food, gas stations, and any other amenities that the above-the-line labor will use throughout the duration of the filming.

However, shooting out of Hollywood does affect those who still work in Hollywood. Below-the-line workers based in Hollywood have a smaller job market because production continues to move out of state.

== Examples ==
- Tadhana (1978) - an adult animated historical satire film commissioned by the Marcos' government under regime with Imee Marcos.
