= XXXIX Corps =

XXXIX Corps or 39th Corps may refer to:

== Germany ==
- XXXIX Reserve Corps, German Empire
- XXXIX Panzer Corps, Wehrmacht

== Russia and Soviet Union ==
- 39th Army Corps (Russian Empire)
- 39th Guards Airborne Corps, Soviet Union

== United Kingdom ==
- 39th Lanarkshire Rifle Volunteer Corps
- 39th (Liverpool Welsh) Lancashire Rifle Volunteer Corps
- 39th (Finsbury) Middlesex Rifle Volunteer Corps
- 39th (Bingley) Yorkshire West Riding Rifle Volunteer Corps

== See also ==
- List of military corps by number
- 39th Army (disambiguation)
- 39th Battalion (disambiguation)
- 39th Brigade (disambiguation)
- 39th Division (disambiguation)
- 39th Regiment (disambiguation)
- 39th Squadron (disambiguation)
- 39th (disambiguation)
