= 39th =

39th is the ordinal form of the number 39. 39th or Thirty-ninth may also refer to:

- A fraction, 1/39, equal to one of 39 equal parts

== Geography ==
- 39th meridian east, a line of longitude
- 39th meridian west, a line of longitude
- 39th parallel north, a circle of latitude
- 39th parallel south, a circle of latitude
- 39th Avenue (disambiguation)
- 39th Street (disambiguation)

== Military ==
- 39th Army (disambiguation)
- 39th Battalion (disambiguation)
- 39th Brigade (disambiguation)
- 39th Division (disambiguation)
- 39th Regiment (disambiguation)
- 39th Squadron (disambiguation)

== Other ==
- Thirty-ninth Amendment (disambiguation)
- 39th century
- 39th century BC

== See also ==
- 39 (disambiguation)
