= 39th Cavalry =

39th Cavalry may refer to:

- 39th Regiment Central India Horse, British India
- 39th (Berkshire) Company, Imperial Yeomanry

== See also ==
- 39th Division (disambiguation)
- 39th Brigade (disambiguation)
- 39th Regiment (disambiguation)
- 39th (disambiguation)
