= 39th Infantry =

39th Infantry may refer to:

- 39th Infantry Division (disambiguation)
- 39th Infantry Brigade (disambiguation)
- 39th Infantry Regiment (disambiguation)
- 39th Infantry Battalion (disambiguation)

== See also ==
- 39th (disambiguation)
