= List of Lucky Star albums =

This article lists the albums attributed to the series Lucky Star.

== Video game theme and character songs ==
=== Lucky Star Vocal Mini Album ===
"Lucky Star" vocal mini album

EP by Ryō Hirohashi, Mai Nakahara, Ami Koshimizu, Ai Shimizu, Miyu Matsuki, and Satsuki Yukino
- Released: December 22, 2005
- Genre: Video game soundtrack
- Length: 29:55
- Label: Frontier Works

"Lucky Star" vocal mini album (『らき☆すた』vocal mini album, Raki☆Suta vocal mini album) is a video game soundtrack for the video game Lucky Star Moe Drill based on the manga Lucky Star. It was first released on December 22, 2005 in Japan.

==== Track listing ====
(All Composition/Arrangement: Shin'ichi Sakurai / Lyrics: Kiyomi Kumano)

1. "Lucky Lucky Baby" (らき☆らき☆べいべー, Raki☆Raki☆Beibē) - 4:16
  - Performed by Ryō Hirohashi, Mai Nakahara, Ami Koshimizu
2. "Otome Gokoro" (オトメ☆ゴコロ; lit. Maiden☆Heart) - 3:20
  - Performed by Ai Shimizu, Miyu Matsuki, Satsuki Yukino
3. "Lucky Lucky Baby" (danceable version) (らき☆らき☆べいべー, Raki☆Raki☆Beibē) - 3:59
4. "Otome Gokoro" (world mix version) (オトメ☆ゴコロ; lit. Maiden☆Heart) - 3:22
5. "Lucky Lucky Baby" (original karaoke) (らき☆らき☆べいべー, Raki☆Raki☆Beibē) - 4:16
6. "Otome Gokoro" (original karaoke) (オトメ☆ゴコロ; lit. Maiden☆Heart) - 3:20
7. "Lucky Lucky Baby" (danceable version original karaoke) (らき☆らき☆べいべー, Raki☆Raki☆Beibē) - 3:59
8. "Otome Gokoro" (world mix version original karaoke) (オトメ☆ゴコロ; lit. Maiden☆Heart) - 3:22

=== Shin Lucky Star Moe Drill ~Tabidachi~: Gomen ne Maxi CD ===
==== KAD-002-B1 ====
""Shin Lucky☆Star Moe Drill ~Tabidachi~" Hatsubai Enki Tsuika Tokuten "Gomen ne MAXI CD" 1"

Single by Ryō Hirohashi, Mai Nakahara, Ami Koshimizu, Mamiko Noto, and Yukari Tamura
- A-side: "Lucky Lucky Everybody"
- B-side: "Lucky Suki Yeah!"
- Released: May 24, 2007
- Genre: Video game soundtrack
- Label: Kadokawa Entertainment

"Shin Lucky☆Star Moe Drill ~Tabidachi~" Hatsubai Enki Tsuika Tokuten "Gomen ne Maxi CD" 1 (『真・らき☆すた萌えドリル 〜旅立ち〜』 発売延期追加特典 ごめんねマキシCD 1) is a video game soundtrack for the video game Shin Lucky Star Moe Drill Tabidachi based on the manga Lucky Star. It was first released on May 24, 2007 with the game package in Japan. Konata Izumi has a solo version of "Lucky Lucky Everybody" on this CD.

===== Track listing =====
(All Composition/Arrangement: Shin'ichi Sakurai / Lyrics: Kiyomi Kumano)

1. "Lucky Lucky Everybody" (らきらき☆EVERYBODY, Raki Raki☆EVERYBODY)
  - Performed by Ryō Hirohashi, Mai Nakahara, Ami Koshimizu
2. "Lucky Suki Yeah!" (らっきー☆すっきーYeah！, Rakkī☆Sukkī Yeah!)
  - Performed by Mamiko Noto, Yukari Tamura
3. "Lucky Lucky Everybody" (Konata Izumi Ver.) (らきらき☆EVERYBODY (泉こなたVer.), Raki Raki☆EVERYBODY)
  - Performed by Ryō Hirohashi

==== KAD-002-B2 ====
""Shin Lucky☆Star Moe Drill ~Tabidachi~" Hatsubai Enki Tsuika Tokuten "Gomen ne MAXI CD" 2"

Single by Ryō Hirohashi, Mai Nakahara, Ami Koshimizu, Mamiko Noto, and Yukari Tamura
- A-side: "Lucky Lucky Everybody"
- B-side: "Lucky Suki Yeah!"
- Released: May 24, 2007
- Genre: Video game soundtrack
- Label: Kadokawa Entertainment

"Shin Lucky☆Star Moe Drill ~Tabidachi~" Hatsubai Enki Tsuika Tokuten "Gomen ne Maxi CD" 2 (『真・らき☆すた萌えドリル 〜旅立ち〜』 発売延期追加特典 ごめんねマキシCD 2) is a video game soundtrack for the video game Shin Lucky Star Moe Drill Tabidachi based on the manga Lucky Star. It was first released on May 24, 2007 with the game package in Japan. Kagami Hiiragi has a solo version of "Lucky Lucky Everybody" on this CD.

===== Track listing =====
1. "Lucky Lucky Everybody" (らきらき☆EVERYBODY, Raki Raki☆EVERYBODY)
2. "Lucky Suki Yeah!" (らっきー☆すっきーYeah！, Rakkī☆Sukkī Yeah!)
3. "Lucky Lucky Everybody" (Kagami Hiiragi Ver.) (らきらき☆EVERYBODY (柊かがみVer.), Raki Raki☆EVERYBODY)
  - Performed by Ami Koshimizu

==== KAD-002-B3 ====
""Shin Lucky☆Star Moe Drill ~Tabidachi~" Hatsubai Enki Tsuika Tokuten "Gomen ne MAXI CD" 3"

Single by Ryō Hirohashi, Mai Nakahara, Ami Koshimizu, Mamiko Noto, and Yukari Tamura
- A-side: "Lucky Lucky Everybody"
- B-side: "Lucky Suki Yeah!"
- Released: May 24, 2007
- Genre: Video game soundtrack
- Label: Kadokawa Entertainment

"Shin Lucky☆Star Moe Drill ~Tabidachi~" Hatsubai Enki Tsuika Tokuten "Gomen ne Maxi CD" 3 (『真・らき☆すた萌えドリル 〜旅立ち〜』 発売延期追加特典 ごめんねマキシCD 3) is a video game soundtrack for the video game Shin Lucky Star Moe Drill Tabidachi based on the manga Lucky Star. It was first released on May 24, 2007 with the game package in Japan. Hinata Miyakawa has a solo version of "Lucky Suki Yeah!" on this CD.

===== Track listing =====
1. "Lucky Lucky Everybody" (らきらき☆EVERYBODY, Raki Raki☆EVERYBODY)
2. "Lucky Suki Yeah!" (らっきー☆すっきーYeah！, Rakkī☆Sukkī Yeah!)
3. "Lucky Suki Yeah!" (Hinata Miyakawa Ver.) (らっきー☆すっきーYeah！ (宮河ひなたVer.), Rakkī☆Sukkī Yeah!)
  - Performed by Mamiko Noto

=== Hamatte Sabotte Oh My God! ===
"PS2 "Lucky Star: Ryōō Gakuen Ōtōsai" Opening/Ending Theme: Hamatte Sabotte Oh My God!"

Single by Aya Hirano, Emiri Katō, Kaori Fukuhara, and Aya Endō
- A-side: "Hamatte Sabotte Oh My God!"
- B-side: "Nantettatte Densetsu"
- Released: March 3, 2008
- Genre: Video game soundtrack
- Length: 17:29
- Label: Lantis

PS2 "Lucky Star: Ryōō Gakuen Ōtōsai" Opening/Ending Theme: Hamatte Sabotte Oh My God! (PS2『らき☆すた ～陵桜学園 桜藤祭～』OP/EDテーマ ハマってサボっておーまいがっ！) is a single containing the opening and ending themes for the PlayStation 2 visual novel adaptation of Lucky Star, Lucky Star: Ryōō Gakuen Ōtōsai.

==== Track listing ====
1. "Hamatte Sabotte Oh My God!" (ハマってサボっておーまいがっ!; lit. Addicted, Lazily, Oh My God!) - 4:27
  - Composition/Arrangement: Satoru Kōsaki
  - Lyrics: Aki Hata
2. "Nantettatte Densetsu" (なんてったって☆伝説) - 4:12
  - Composition/Arrangement: nishi-ken
  - Lyrics: Aki Hata
3. "Hamatte Sabotte Oh My God!" (off vocal) (ハマってサボっておーまいがっ!; lit. Addicted, Lazily, Oh My God!) - 4:27
4. "Nantettatte Densetsu" (off vocal) (なんてったって☆伝説) - 4:12

=== Na.Ri.A.Ga.Ri ===
"PSP "Lucky Star: Net Idol Meister" Opening/Ending Theme: Na.Ri.A.Ga.Ri"

Single by Aya Hirano, Emiri Katō, Kaori Fukuhara, and Aya Endō
- A-side: "Na.Ri.A.Ga.Ri"
- B-side: "Nande Dattakke Idol?"
- Released: January 27, 2010
- Genre: Video game soundtrack
- Length: 15:23
- Label: Lantis

PSP "Lucky Star: Net Idol Meister" Opening/Ending Theme: Na.Ri.A.Ga.Ri (PSP『らき☆すた ネットアイドル・マイスター』OP/EDテーマ な・り・あ・が・り☆) is a single containing the opening and ending themes for the PlayStation Portable SLG adaptation of Lucky Star, Lucky Star: Net Idol Meister.

==== Track listing ====
(All Composition/Arrangement: Ken'ichi Maeyamada / Lyrics: Aki Hata)

1. "Na.Ri.A.Ga.Ri" (な・り・あ・が・り☆; lit. U.p.s.t.a.r.t☆) - 4:18
2. "Nande Dattakke Idol?" (なんでだったっけアイドル?) - 3:24
3. "Na.Ri.A.Ga.Ri" (off vocal) (な・り・あ・が・り☆; lit. U.p.s.t.a.r.t☆) - 4:18
4. "Nande Dattakke Idol?" (off vocal) (なんでだったっけアイドル?) - 3:24

== Anime theme and character songs ==
=== Motteke! Sailor Fuku ===
"TV Anime "Lucky Star" Opening Theme: Motteke! Sailor Fuku"

Single by Aya Hirano, Emiri Katō, Kaori Fukuhara, and Aya Endō
- A-side: "Motteke! Sailor Fuku"
- B-side: "Kaeshite! Knee Socks"
- Released: May 23, 2007
- Genre: J-pop
- Length: 16:48
- Label: Lantis

TV Anime "Lucky Star" Opening Theme: Motteke! Sailor Fuku (TVアニメ『らき☆すた』OPテーマ もってけ！セーラーふく, Motteke! Sērāfuku; Take It! Sailor Uniform) is a single by Aya Hirano, Emiri Katō, Kaori Fukuhara, and Aya Endō which was used as the opening theme to the anime Lucky Star. It was released on May 23, 2007 by Lantis. Upon its release, the single reached the number two spot on the weekly Oricon charts. The opening video of the anime contains this song and a choreographed dance routine. It too gained popularity via the Internet, being frequently the subject of parody and some fans considered it to be the next "Hare Hare Yukai"; both sequences were animated by the same studio – Kyoto Animation. In 2007, "Motteke! Sailor Fuku" won the Radio Kansai Award, a subset of the Animation Kobe Theme Song Award. The song was used in the Japanese Wii video game Taiko no Tatsujin.

==== Track listing ====
1. "Take It! Sailor Uniform" (もってけ！セーラーふく, Motteke! Sērāfuku) – 4:18
  - Composition/Arrangement: Satoru Kōsaki
  - Lyrics: Aki Hata
2. "Return Them! Knee Socks" (かえして！ニーソックス, Kaeshite! Nīsokkusu) – 4:06
  - Composition/Arrangement: nishi-ken
  - Lyrics: Aki Hata
3. "Take It! Sailor Uniform" (off vocal) (もってけ！セーラーふく, Motteke! Sērāfuku) – 4:18
4. "Return Them! Knee Socks" (off vocal) (かえして！ニーソックス, Kaeshite! Nīsokkusu) – 4:06

=== Lucky Star Ending Theme Collection ===
TV Anime "Lucky Star" Ending Theme Collection: One Day Karaoke Box

Studio album by Aya Hirano, Emiri Katō, Kaori Fukuhara, and Aya Endō
- Released: July 11, 2007
- Genre: Anime soundtrack (Drama)
- Length: 70:16
- Label: Lantis

TV Anime "Lucky Star" Ending Theme Collection: One Day Karaoke Box (TVアニメ『らき☆すた』エンディングテーマ集 〜ある日のカラオケボックス〜, TV Anime Raki☆Suta Endingu Tēma Shū: Aruhi no Karaoke Bokkusu) is an album containing the first twelve ending themes of the anime Lucky Star by Aya Hirano, Emiri Katō, Kaori Fukuhara, and Aya Endō. The album was released on July 11, 2007 by Lantis. The first twelve tracks are the versions played in the anime, and the last thirteen are the full-length versions; the only track that did not have a TV-size version on this album was "Go! Godman".

==== Track listing ====
1. "Episode 1: Space Ironman Kyodain" (第一話 宇宙鉄人キョーダイン, Daichiwa Uchū Tetsujin Kyōdain) - 1:30
2. "Episode 2: It's a Victory! Akumaizer 3" (第二話 勝利だ！アクマイザー3, Dainiwa Shōri da! Akumaizā 3) - 1:30
3. "Episode 3: That's Love, Right?" (第三話 それが、愛でしょう, Daisanwa Sore ga, Ai deshō) - 1:30
4. "Episode 4: Sailor Suit and Machine Gun" (第四話 セーラー服と機関銃, Daiyonwa Sailor Fuku to Kikanjū) - 1:30
5. "Episode 5: Cha-La Head-Cha-La" (第五話 CHA-LA HEAD-CHA-LA, Daigowa Chara Hetchara) - 1:30
6. "Episode 6: Valentine Kiss" (第六話 バレンタイン・キッス, Dairokuwa Barentain Kissu) - 1:30
7. "Episode 7: Earthly Stars" (第七話 地上の星, Dainanawa Chijō no Hoshi) - 1:30
8. "Episode 8: Monkey Magic" (第八話 MONKEY MAGIC, Daihachiwa Monkī Majikku) - 1:30
9. "Episode 9: Embraced by the Wintry Wind" (第九話 木枯しに抱かれて, Daikyūwa Kogarashi Ni Dakarete) - 1:30
10. "Episode 10: I'm Proud" (第十話 I'm proud, Daijūwa Aimu Puraudo) - 1:30
11. "Episode 11: Doraemon's Song" (第十一話 ドラえもんのうた, Daijūichiwa Doraemon no Uta) - 1:30
12. "Episode 12: Don't Lose" (第十二話 負けないで, Daijūniwa Makenaide) - 1:30
13. "Space Ironman Kyodain" (宇宙鉄人キョーダイン, Uchū Tetsujin Kyōdain) - 2:55
  - Performed by Aya Hirano
  - Composition/Arrangement: Shunsuke Kikuchi
  - Lyrics: Shōtarō Ishinomori
14. "It's a Victory! Akumaizer 3" (勝利だ！アクマイザー3, Shōri da! Akumaizā 3) - 3:10
  - Performed by Aya Hirano
  - Composition/Arrangement: Michiaki Watanabe
  - Lyrics: Shōtarō Ishinomori
15. "That's Love, Right?" (それが、愛でしょう, Sore ga, Ai deshō) - 5:11
  - Performed by Aya Hirano
  - Composition/Arrangement: Sin
  - Lyrics: Mikuni Shimokawa
16. "Sailor Suit and Machine Gun" (セーラー服と機関銃, Sailor Fuku to Kikanjū) - 4:28
  - Performed by Emiri Katō
  - Composition: Takao Kisugi
  - Arrangement: Masaru Hoshi
  - Lyrics: Etsuko Kisugi
17. "Cha-La Head-Cha-La" (CHA-LA HEAD-CHA-LA, Chara Hetchara) - 3:17
  - Performed by Aya Hirano
  - Composition: Chiho Kiyooka
  - Arrangement: Kenji Yamamoto
  - Lyrics: Yukinojō Mori
18. "Valentine Kiss" (バレンタイン・キッス, Barentain Kissu) - 3:32
  - Performed by Kaori Fukuhara
  - Composition: Hiroaki Sei
  - Arrangement: Jun Satō
  - Lyrics: Yasushi Akimoto
19. "Earthly Stars" (地上の星, Chijō no Hoshi) - 5:09
  - Performed by Aya Endō
  - Composition/Lyrics: Miyuki Nakajima
  - Arrangement: Ichizō Seo
20. "Monkey Magic" (MONKEY MAGIC, Monkī Majikku) - 4:46
  - Performed by Aya Hirano
  - Composition: Yukihide Takekawa
  - Arrangement: Mickie Yoshino
  - Lyrics: Yōko Narahashi
21. "Embraced by the Wintry Wind" (木枯しに抱かれて, Kogarashi Ni Dakarete) - 3:40
  - Performed by Aya Hirano
  - Composition/Lyrics: Toshihiko Takamizawa
  - Arrangement: Akira Inoue
22. "I'm Proud" (I'm Proud, Aimu Puraudo) - 5:32
  - Performed by Emiri Katō
  - Composition/Arrangement/Lyrics: Tetsuya Komuro
23. "Doraemon's Song" (ドラえもんのうた, Doraemon no Uta) - 2:59
  - Performed by Aya Hirano, Emiri Katō, Kaori Fukuhara, Aya Endō
  - Composition/Arrangement: Shunsuke Kikuchi
  - Lyrics: Kakumi Kusube
  - Complement lyrics: Susumu Baba
24. "Go! Godman" (行け！ゴッドマン, Ike! Goddoman) - 2:53
  - Performed by Aya Hirano
  - Composition: Takeo Yamashita
  - Arrangement: Masakazu Hirose
  - Lyrics: Kōnosuke Fuji
25. "Don't Lose" (負けないで, Makenaide) - 3:44
  - Performed by Aya Hirano, Emiri Katō, Kaori Fukuhara, Aya Endō
  - Composition: Tetsurō Oda
  - Arrangement: Takeshi Hayama
  - Lyrics: Izumi Sakai

=== Aimai Net Darling ===
"Radio "Lucky Channel" Opening Theme: Aimai Net Darling"

Single by Hiromi Konno, and Minoru Shiraishi
- A-side: "Aimai Net Darling"
- B-side: "Connect Love Mission"
- Released: July 25, 2007
- Recorded: 19:33
- Label: Lantis

Radio "Lucky Channel" Opening Theme: Aimai Net Darling (ラジオ『らっきー☆ちゃんねる』OPテーマ 曖昧ネットだーりん, Rajio Rakkī☆Channeru Ōpuningu Tēma Aimai Netto Dārin) is a maxi single containing songs sung by Hiromi Konno, and Minoru Shiraishi of the Lucky Channel segment at the end of each episode of Lucky Star. The single was released on July 25, 2007 by Lantis.

==== Track listing ====
(All Composition/Arrangement: Satoru Kōsaki / Lyrics: Aki Hata)

1. "Vague Net Darling" (曖昧ネットだーりん, Aimai Netto Dārin) - 4:14
2. "Connect Love Mission" (こねらぶ☆みっしょん, Konerabu Misshon) - 5:31
3. "Vague Net Darling" (off vocal) (曖昧ネットだーりん, Aimai Netto Dārin) - 4:14
4. "Connect Love Mission" (off vocal) (こねらぶ☆みっしょん, Konerabu Misshon) - 5:31

=== Motteke! Sailor Fuku Re-mix 001 ===
"TV Anime "Lucky Star" Opening Theme: Motteke! Sailor Fuku Re-mix 001 -7 Burning Remixers-"

Single by Aya Hirano, Emiri Katō, Kaori Fukuhara, and Aya Endō
- A-side: "Motteke! Sailor Fuku" [Chōshi Koite Gyokusai Mix]
- Released: August 8, 2007
- Length: 34:53
- Label: Lantis

TV Anime "Lucky Star" Opening Theme: Motteke! Sailor Fuku Re-mix 001 -7 Burning Remixers- (TVアニメ『らき☆すた』OPテーマ もってけ!セーラーふくRe-Mix001〜7 burning Remixers〜, Motteke! Sērā Fuku Rimikkusu 001 -7 Burning Remixers-) is a remix album of Motteke! Sailor Fuku, the single album containing the opening theme of the anime series Lucky Star. The remix single was released on August 8, 2007 by Lantis. This album was ranked number three the week of August 12, 2007 after selling 30,000 units.

==== Track listing ====
(All Composition: Satoru Kōsaki / Lyrics: Aki Hata)

1. "Motteke! Sailor Fuku" [Chōshi Koite Gyokusai Mix] (もってけ！セーラーふく【調子こいて玉砕ミックス】, Motteke! Sērā Fuku [Chōshi Koite Gyokusai Mikkusu]) - 4:15
  - Remixed by eicheph (Hideyuki Fukasawa)
2. "Motteke! Sailor Fuku" [Metabo Taisaku Mix] (もってけ！セーラーふく【メタボ対策Mix】, Motteke! Sērā Fuku [Metabo Taisaku Mix]) - 3:40
  - Remixed by Raito
3. "Motteke! Sailor Fuku" [Nako no Hito on the floor mix] (もってけ！セーラーふく【中の人on the floor mix】, Motteke! Sērā Fuku [Naka no Hito on the floor mix]) - 5:27
  - Remixed by bassjack (Hideyuki Fukasawa)
4. "Motteke! Sailor Fuku" [-Undakada~Kyō no Yabō-] (もってけ！セーラーふく【-うんだかだ〜教の野望-】, Motteke! Sērā Fuku [-Undakada~Kyō no Yabō-]) - 6:14
  - Remixed by Susumu Kayamori@Mosaic.wav
5. "Motteke! Sailor Fuku" [Glucosa Mix] (もってけ！セーラーふく【グルコサミっくす】, Motteke! Sērā Fuku [Gurukosa Mikkusu]) - 3:28
  - Remixed by Nanashi san (Hideyuki Fukasawa)
6. "Motteke! Sailor Fuku" [Matsuri Mix!] (もってけ！セーラーふく【祭みっくす！】, Motteke! Sērā Fuku [Matsuri Mikkusu!]) - 6:14
  - Remixed by Masaya Koike@4-Ever
7. "Motteke! Sailor Fuku" [Seishun orz Mix] (もってけ！セーラーふく【青春orzミックス】, Motteke! Sērā Fuku [Seishun orz Mikkusu]) - 6:15
  - Remixed by eicheph (Hideyuki Fukasawa)

=== Cosutte! Oh My Honey ===
"TV Anime "Lucky Star" The CD of Konata and Patty made and sold in cosplay cafe: Cosutte! Oh My Honey"

Single by Aya Hirano and Nozomi Sasaki
- A-side: "Cosutte! Oh My Honey"
- B-side: "Yuuchou Sentai Dara Ranger"
- Released: August 29, 2007
- Length: 16:39
- Label: Lantis

TV Anime "Lucky Star" The CD of Konata and Patty made and sold in cosplay cafe: Cosutte! Oh My Honey (TVアニメ『らき☆すた』こなたとパティが作った、コスプレ喫茶で売っているCD コスって!オーマイハニー, TV Anime Raki☆Suta Konata to Patī ga Tsukutta, Kospure Kissa de Utteiru CD: Kosutte! Ō Mai Hanī) is a maxi single released for the anime series Lucky Star on August 29, 2007 by Lantis. The single is a duet album with the two artists Aya Hirano who plays Konata Izumi, and Nozomi Sasaki who plays Patricia Martin. An image of the cover art was viewable in episode sixteen of the anime series.

==== Track listing ====
(All Composition/Arrangement: Satoru Kōsaki / Lyrics: Aki Hata)

1. "Cosutte! Oh My Honey" (コスって！オーマイハニー, Kosutte! Ō Mai Hanī; lit. Cos' It! Oh My Honey) - 4:40
2. "Yuuchou Sentai Dara Ranger" (悠長戦隊ダラレンジャー, Yūchō Sentai Dararenjā; lit. Easygoing Task Force Punranger) - 3:37
3. "Cosutte! Oh My Honey" (karaoke) (コスって！オーマイハニー, Kosutte! Ō Mai Hanī; lit. Cos' It! Oh My Honey) - 4:40
4. "Yuuchou Sentai Dara Ranger" (karaoke) (悠長戦隊ダラレンジャー, Yūchō Sentai Dararenjā; lit. Easygoing Task Force Punranger) - 3:37

=== Misoji Misaki ===
"TV Anime "Lucky Star" Insert Song: Misoji Misaki"

Single by Hiromi Konno
- A-side: "Misoji Misaki"
- B-side: "Yume Musubi no Ame"
- Released: August 29, 2007
- Length: 17:14
- Label: Lantis

TV Anime "Lucky Star" Insert Song: Misoji Misaki (TVアニメ『らき☆すた』挿入歌 三十路岬; lit. The Cape of Age Thirty) is a maxi single by Hiromi Konno who plays Akira Kogami from the anime series Lucky Star. The single was released on August 29, 2007 by Lantis. "Misoji Misaki" was the ending theme for the sixteenth episode of Lucky Star.

==== Track listing ====
(All Composition/Arrangement: Satoru Kōsaki / Lyrics: Aki Hata)

1. "The Cape of Age Thirty" (三十路岬, Misoji Misaki) - 4:16
2. "Dream-Ending Rain" (夢結びの雨, Yume Musubi no Ame) - 4:16
3. "The Cape of Age Thirty" (original karaoke) (三十路岬, Misoji Misaki) - 4:16
4. "Dream-Ending Rain" (original karaoke) (夢結びの雨, Yume Musubi no Ame) - 4:16

=== Character song singles ===
The following character song albums are sung by the voice actors of both the main cast as well as the supporting cast of characters. There are thirteen character albums in all.

The first four albums released include songs by Aya Hirano as Konata Izumi, Emiri Katō as Kagami Hiiragi, Kaori Fukuhara as Tsukasa Hiiragi, and Aya Endō as Miyuki Takara; these four albums were released on September 5, 2007. The next four released include songs by Shizuka Hasegawa as Yutaka Kobayakawa, Minori Chihara as Minami Iwasaki, Kaori Shimizu as Hiyori Tamura, and Nozomi Sasaki as Patricia Martin; these four albums were released on September 26, 2007. The ninth album was a duet with Kaoru Mizuhara as Misao Kusakabe, and Mai Aizawa as Ayano Minegishi which was released on October 24, 2007. The tenth was a trio between Aya Hirano, Shizuka Hasegawa, and Minori Chihara as Konata, Yutaka, and Minami respectively which was released on October 24, 2007. The eleventh album was another duet between Hirokazu Hiramatsu as Sōjirō Izumi, and Sumi Shimamoto as Kanata Izumi which was released on November 21, 2007. The twelfth album was a duet with Saori Nishihara as Yui Narumi, and Konomi Maeda as Nanako Kuroi which was also released on November 21, 2007. The last album is a solo featuring Kaoru Mizuhara as Misao and was released on March 26, 2008.

==== Konata Izumi ====
"TV Anime "Lucky Star" Character Song featuring Konata Vol. 001"

Single by Aya Hirano
- A-side: "Dondake Fanfare"
- B-side: "D Drive/Love"
- Released: September 5, 2007
- Length: 18:55
- Label: Lantis

TV Anime "Lucky Star" Character Song featuring Konata Izumi Vol. 001 (TVアニメ『らき☆すた』キャラクターソング Vol.001 泉こなた（平野 綾）, TV Anime Raki Suta Kyarakutā Songu Vol. 001 Izumi Konata) is the first volume of the character song albums and was released on September 5, 2007. The term 'dondake' in the song title "Dondake Fanfare" is a term in Osaka dialect which is used to express surprise at a large amount of something (generally positively) that was popularized through many comedians and J-Pop artists, and thus would equate in English as, "What the?!"

===== Track listing =====
1. "Dondake Fanfare" (どんだけファンファーレ, Dondake Fanfāre) – 4:08
  - Composition: Yukari Hashimoto
  - Arrangement: nishi-ken
  - Lyrics: Aki Hata
2. "D Drive/Love" (Dドライヴ/ラヴ, Dī Doraivu/Ravu) – 4:54
  - Composition/Arrangement: nishi-ken
  - Lyrics: Aki Hata
3. "Loading_Konata_Speaking" – 0:51
  - Track maker: r-midwest
4. "Dondake Fanfare" (off vocal) (どんだけファンファーレ, Dondake Fanfāre) – 4:08
5. "D Drive/Love" (off vocal) (Dドライヴ/ラヴ, Dī Doraivu/Ravu) – 4:54

==== Kagami Hiiragi ====
"TV Anime "Lucky Star" Character Song featuring Kagami Hiiragi Vol. 002"

Single by Emiri Katō
- A-side: "Kenka Yohō no Jikan dayo"
- B-side: "100%? Nai Nai Nai"
- Released: September 5, 2007
- Length: 16:16
- Label: Lantis

TV Anime "Lucky Star" Character Song featuring Kagami Hiiragi Vol. 002 (TVアニメ『らき☆すた』キャラクターソング Vol.002 柊かがみ（加藤英美里）, TV Anime Raki Suta Kyarakutā Songu Vol. 002 Hiiragi Kagami) is the second volume of the character song albums and was released on September 5, 2007. The song peaked at number 9 on Oricon's charts.

===== Track listing =====
1. "It's Time to Predict the Fight" (ケンカ予報の時間だよ, Kenka Yohō no Jikan dayo) – 3:43
  - Composition: Keiji Ayahara
  - Arrangement: nishi-ken
  - Lyrics: Aki Hata
2. "100%? No, No, No" (100%?ナイナイナイ, Hyaku Pāsento? Nai Nai Nai) – 3:53
  - Composition: Tomokazu Tashiro
  - Arrangement: Yukari Hashimoto
  - Lyrics: Aki Hata
3. "I'm sorry by kagami" – 1:04
  - Track maker: r-midwest
4. "It's Time to Predict the Fight" (off vocal) (ケンカ予報の時間だよ, Kenka Yohō no Jikan dayo) – 3:43
5. "100%? No, No, No" (off vocal) (100%？ナイナイナイ, Hyaku Pāsento? Nai Nai Nai) – 3:53

==== Tsukasa Hiiragi ====
"TV Anime "Lucky Star" Character Song featuring Tsukasa Hiiragi Vol. 003"

Single by Kaori Fukuhara
- A-side: "Ne-Ni-Ge de Reset!"
- B-side: "Sister Wars"
- Released: September 5, 2007
- Length: 18:19
- Label: Lantis

TV Anime "Lucky Star" Character Song featuring Tsukasa Hiiragi Vol. 003 (TVアニメ『らき☆すた』キャラクターソング Vol.003 柊つかさ, TV Anime Raki Suta Kyarakutā Songu Vol. 003 Hiiragi Tsukasa) is the third volume of the character song albums and was released on September 5, 2007.

===== Track listing =====
1. "Escape by Sleep and Reset!" (寝・逃・げでリセット！, Ne-Ni-Ge de Risetto!) – 4:33
  - Composition: Isao
  - Arrangement: nishi-ken
  - Lyrics: Aki Hata
2. "Sister Wars" (しすたー・うぉーず, Shisutā Wōzu) – 4:09
  - Composition: Shinji Tamura
  - Arrangement: Hideyuki Fukazawa
  - Lyrics: Aki Hata
3. "yume-tsukasa-night-loopin'" – 0:55
  - Track maker: Raito
4. "Escape by Sleep and Reset!" (off vocal) (寝・逃・げでリセット！, Ne-Ni-Ge de Risetto!) – 4:33
5. "Sister Wars" (off vocal) (しすたー・うぉーず, Shisutā Wōzu) – 4:09

==== Miyuki Takara ====
"Lucky Star Character Song featuring Miyuki Vol. 004"

Single by Aya Endō
- A-side: "Moe Yōsotte Nandesuka?"
- B-side: "Tabun Kanari Futsū no Kyūjitsu"
- Released: September 5, 2007
- Length: 18:13
- Label: Lantis

TV Anime "Lucky Star" Character Song featuring Miyuki Takara Vol. 004 (TVアニメ『らき☆すた』キャラクターソング Vol.004 高良みゆき, TV Anime Raki Suta Kyarakutā Songu Vol. 004 Takara Miyuki) is the fourth volume of the character song albums and was released on September 5, 2007.

===== Track listing =====
1. "What Are 'Moe Aspects'?" (萌え要素ってなんですか？, Moe Yōsotte Nandesuka?) – 4:49
  - Composition: Katsumi Tomono
  - Lyrics: Aki Hata
  - Arrangement: Satoru Kōsaki
2. "It is Probably a Very Ordinary Holiday" (たぶんかなり普通の休日, Tabun Kanari Futsū no Kyūjitsu) – 3:48
  - Composition/Arrangement: Tomoki Kikuya
  - Lyrics: Aki Hata
3. "Rhyme of miyuki continued" – 0:59
  - Track maker: Raito
4. "What Are 'Moe Aspects'?" (off vocal) (萌え要素ってなんですか？, Moe Yōsotte Nandesuka?) – 4:49
5. "It is Probably a Very Ordinary Holiday" (off vocal) (たぶんかなり普通の休日, Tabun Kanari Futsū no Kyūjitsu) – 3:48

==== Yutaka Kobayakawa ====
"TV Anime "Lucky Star" Character Song featuring Yutaka Kobayakawa Vol. 005"

Single by Shizuka Hasegawa
- A-side: "Minimum Tempo"
- B-side: "Tatoeba Pink to Blue demo"
- Released: September 26, 2007
- Length: 18:36
- Label: Lantis

TV Anime "Lucky Star" Character Song featuring Yutaka Kobayakawa Vol. 005 (TVアニメ『らき☆すた』キャラクターソング Vol.005 小早川ゆたか, TV Anime Raki Suta Kyarakutā Songu Vol. 005 Kobayakawa Yutaka) is the fifth volume of the character song albums and was released on September 26, 2007.

===== Track listing =====
1. "Minimum Tempo" (みにまむテンポ, Minimamu Tenpo) – 4:24
  - Lyrics: Aki Hata
  - Composition/Arrangement: Tomoki Kikuya
2. "But, For Example, Pink and Blue" (たとえばピンクとブルーでも, Tatoeba Pinku to Burū demo) – 4:12
  - Composition: Isao
  - Lyrics: Aki Hata
  - Arrangement: tetsu-yeah
3. "i-Free Tempo U-taka apartmentronik" – 1:24
  - Track maker: r-midwest
4. "Minimum Tempo" (off vocal) (みにまむテンポ, Minimamu Tenpo) – 4:24
5. "But, For Example, Pink and Blue" (off vocal) (たとえばピンクとブルーでも, Tatoeba Pinku to Burū demo) – 4:12

==== Minami Iwasaki ====
"TV Anime "Lucky Star" Character Song featuring Minami Iwasaki Vol. 006"

Single by Minori Chihara
- A-side: "Mokutto Yasumi Jikan"
- B-side: "Tōmei Ribbon"
- Released: September 26, 2007
- Length: 19:33
- Label: Lantis

TV Anime "Lucky Star" Character Song featuring Minami Iwasaki Vol. 006 (TVアニメ『らき☆すた』キャラクターソング Vol.006 岩崎みなみ, TV Anime Raki Suta Kyarakutā Songu Vol. 006 Iwasaki Minami) is the sixth volume of the character song albums and was released on September 26, 2007.

===== Track listing =====
1. "Silent Break Time" (黙っと休み時間, Mokutto Yasumi Jikan) – 4:41
  - Composition: Keiji Ayahara
  - Arrangement: Akio Kondō
  - Lyrics: Aki Hata
2. "Transparent Ribbon" (透明リボン, Tōmei Ribon) – 4:30
  - Composition: rino
  - Arrangement: Nijine (Akito Matsuda)
  - Lyrics: Aki Hata
3. "mokutt minami growing" – 1:11
  - Track maker: r-midwest
4. "Silent Break Time" (off vocal) (黙っと休み時間, Mokutto Yasumi Jikan) – 4:41
5. "Transparent Ribbon" (off vocal) (透明リボン, Tōmei Ribon) – 4:30

==== Hiyori Tamura ====
"TV Anime "Lucky Star" Character Song featuring Hiyori Tamura Vol. 007"

Single by Kaori Shimizu
- A-side: "Mo, Mōsō Machine."
- B-side: "Default Joshikōsei Nyan"
- Released: September 26, 2007
- Length: 17:07
- Label: Lantis

TV Anime "Lucky Star" Character Song featuring Hiyori Tamura Vol. 007 (TVアニメ『らき☆すた』キャラクターソング Vol.007 田村ひより, TV Anime Raki Suta Kyarakutā Songu Vol. 007 Tamura Hiyori) is the seventh volume of the character song albums and was released on September 26, 2007.

===== Track listing =====
1. "De, Delusion Machine." (も、妄想マシーン。, Mo, Mōsō Mashīn.) – 3:57
  - Composition: Tomokazu Tashiro
  - Arrangement: Takahiro Andō
  - Lyrics: Aki Hata
2. "Default Female High School Student Meow" (デフォルト女子高生にゃん, Deforuto Joshikōsei Nyan) – 3:48
  - Composition/Arrangement: Yamato Itō
  - Lyrics: Aki Hata
3. "he_yo_reason&mechanique" – 1:36
  - Track maker: A-bee
4. "De, Delusion Machine." (off vocal) (も、妄想マシーン。, Mo, Mōsō Mashīn.) – 3:57
5. "Default Female High School Student Meow" (off vocal) (デフォルト女子高生にゃん, Deforuto Joshikōsei Nyan) – 3:48

==== Patricia Martin ====
"TV Anime "Lucky Star" Character Song featuring Patricia Martin Vol. 008"

Single by Nozomi Sasaki
- A-side: "Cosplay no Kokoroe"
- B-side: "Saidai Seichi Carnival"
- Released: September 26, 2007
- Length: 19:39
- Label: Lantis

TV Anime "Lucky Star" Character Song featuring Patricia Martin Vol. 008 (TVアニメ『らき☆すた』キャラクターソング Vol.008 パトリシア・マーティン, TV Anime Raki Suta Kyarakutā Songu Vol. 008 Patricia Martin) is the eighth volume of the character song albums and was released on September 26, 2007.

===== Track listing =====
1. "Cosplay Knowledge" (こすぷれノこころえ, Kosupure no Kokoroe) – 4:24
  - Composition: Kōsuke Kanai
  - Arrangement: Masaya Koike
  - Lyrics: Aki Hata
2. "The Greatest Holy Ground Carnival" (最大聖地カーニバル, Saidai Seichi Kānibaru) – 4:47
  - Composition/Arrangement: Satoru Kōsaki
  - Lyrics: Aki Hata
3. "pa pa pa pa patti" – 1:17
  - Track maker: Raito
4. "Cosplay Knowledge" (off vocal) (こすぷれノこころえ, Kosupure no Kokoroe) – 4:24
5. "The Greatest Holy Ground Carnival" (off vocal) (最大聖地カーニバル, Saidai Seichi Kānibaru) – 4:47

==== Misao Kusakabe and Ayano Minegishi ====
"TV Anime "Lucky Star" Character Song Vol. 009 Haikei Combination"

Single by Kaoru Mizuhara and Mai Aizawa
- A-side: "Haikei Houdai Yariho-dai?"
- B-side: "Lu' wa Lucky Star no 'Lu"
- Released: October 31, 2007
- Length: 19:07
- Label: Lantis

TV Anime "Lucky Star" Character Song Vol. 009 Haikei Combination (TVアニメ『らき☆すた』 キャラクターソング Vol.009 背景コンビ, TV Anime Raki Suta Kyarakutā Songu Vol. 009 Haikei Konbi) is the ninth volume of the character song albums and was released on October 31, 2007.

===== Track listing =====
1. "'Lu' is the 'Lu' in Lucky Star" ("ラ"はらき☆すたの"ラ", 'Lu' wa Lucky Star no 'Lu') – 4:45
  - Composition/Arrangement: nishi-ken
  - Lyrics: Aki Hata
2. "Is Being the Spearhead of Always Being in the Background Okay?" (背景放題やりほーだい？, Haikei Houdai Yariho-dai?) – 4:16
  - Composition/Arrangement: nishi-ken
  - Lyrics: Aki Hata
3. "aYa miSa post modern & ambients"— 1:48
  - Track maker: A-bee
4. "'Lu' is the 'Lu' in Lucky Star" (off vocal) ("ラ"はらき☆すたの"ラ", 'Lu' wa Lucky Star no 'Lu') – 4:45
5. "Is Being the Spearhead of Always Being in the Background Okay?" (off vocal) (背景放題やりほーだい？, Haikei Houdai Yariho-dai?) – 4:16

==== Konata, Yutaka, and Minami ====
"Lucky Star Character Song Vol. 010 Mune Pettan Girls"

Single by Aya Hirano, Shizuka Hasegawa, and Minori Chihara
- A-side: "Minna de 5ji Pittan"
- B-side: "Lolita Teikoku Bisho-jo Taitei"
- Released: October 31, 2007
- Label: Lantis

TV Anime "Lucky Star" Character Song Vol. 010 Mune Pettan Girls (TVアニメ『らき☆すた』 キャラクターソング Vol.010 胸ぺったんガールズ, TV Anime Raki Suta Kyarakutā Songu Vol. 001 Mune Pettan Gāruzu) is the tenth volume of the character song albums and was released on October 31, 2007. The CD's title loosely means Flat-Chested Girls, and the title of the song "Minna de 5ji Pittan", is a play on the game Mojipittan.

===== Track listing =====
1. "Everybody 5ji Pittan" (みんなで5じぴったん, Minna de 5ji Pittan) – 4:48
  - Lyrics: Aki Hata
  - Composition/Arrangement: Satoru Kōsaki
2. "The Pretty-Girl Empress of the Lolita Empire" (ロリィタ帝国ビショージョ大帝, Lolita Teikoku Bisho-jo Taitei) – 3:59
  - Lyrics: Aki Hata
  - Composition/Arrangement: Satoru Kōsaki
3. "kona-yta-mina-tangs be Altered Scale"— 1:59
  - Track maker: r-midwest
4. "Everybody 5ji Pittan" (off vocal) (みんなで5じぴったん, Minna de 5ji Pittan) – 4:48
5. "The Pretty-Girl Empress of the Lolita Empire" (off vocal) (ロリィタ帝国ビショージョ大帝, Lolita Teikoku Bisho-jo Taitei) – 3:59

==== Sōjirō and Kanata Izumi ====
"TV Anime "Lucky Star" Character Song featuring Sōjirō and Kanata Izumi Vol. 011"

Single by Hirokazu Hiramatsu and Sumi Shimamoto
- A-side: "Shiawase Negau Kanata Kara"
- B-side: Onna wa Yome to Musume Dake; Sekai ga Kiete mo Aishiteru
- Released: November 21, 2007
- Length: 28:18
- Label: Lantis

TV Anime "Lucky Star" Character Song featuring Sōjirō and Kanata Izumi Vol. 011 (TVアニメ『らき☆すた』キャラクターソング Vol.011 泉かなた & 泉そうじろう, TV Anime Raki Suta Kyarakutā Songu Vol. 011 Izumi Kanata & Sōjirō Izumi)) is the eleventh volume of the character song albums and was released on November 21, 2007. "I Wish for Happiness from the Yonder" was featured in episode twenty-two of the anime as an instrumental score, during Kanata's introduction as a ghost.

===== Track listing =====
1. "I Wish for Happiness from the Yonder" (幸せ願う彼方から, Shiawase Negau Kanata Kara) – 5:36
  - Performed by Sumi Shimamoto
  - Composition/Arrangement: Satoru Kōsaki
  - Lyrics: Aki Hata
2. "My Women are Only My Bride and My Daughter" (女はヨメとムスメだけ, Onna wa Yome to Musume Dake) – 4:21
  - Performed by Hirokazu Hiramatsu
  - Composition/Arrangement: Kōsuke Kanai
  - Lyrics: Aki Hata
3. "I Love You Even if the World Vanishes" (世界が消えても愛してる, Sekai ga Kiete mo Aishiteru) – 4:14
  - Performed by Sumi Shimamoto and Hirokazu Hiramatsu
  - Composition: rino
  - Arrangement: Tomoki Kikuya
  - Lyrics: Aki Hata
4. "I Wish for Happiness from the Yonder" (off vocal) (幸せ願う彼方から, Shiawase Negau Kanata Kara) – 5:36
5. "My Women are Only My Bride and My Daughter" (off vocal) (女はヨメとムスメだけ, Onna wa Yome to Musume Dake) – 4:21
6. "I Love You Even if the World Vanishes" (off vocal) (世界が消えても愛してる, Sekai ga Kiete mo Aishiteru) – 4:11

==== Yui Narumi and Nanako Kuroi ====
"TV Anime "Lucky Star" Character Song featuring Yui Narumi and Nanako Kuroi Vol. 012"

Single by Saori Nishihara and Konomi Maeda
- A-side: "Kekkon Nantesa Pa-Pa-Yā"
- B-side: "Tekireiki na Lady"
- Released: November 21, 2007
- Length: 19:50
- Label: Lantis

TV Anime "Lucky Star" Character Song featuring Yui Narumi and Nanako Kuroi Vol. 012 (TVアニメ『らき☆すた』キャラクターソング Vol.012 黒井ななこ&成実ゆい, TV Anime Raki Suta Kyarakutā Songu Vol. 012 Kuroi Nanako & Narumi Yui) is the twelfth volume of the character songs albums and was released on November 21, 2007.

===== Track listing =====
1. "What They Call "Marriage", Pa-Pa-Yā" (結婚なんてさパッパヤー, Kekkon Nantesa Pa-Pa-Yā) – 3:54
  - Composition/Arrangement: Kōsuke Kanai
  - Lyrics: Aki Hata
2. "Marrying Age Lady" (適齢期なレイディ, Tekireiki na Lady) – 4:00
  - Composition/Arrangement/Lyrics: Yamato Itō
3. "yui's_Hundred_Days_Nana's_Bells" – 1:10
  - Track maker: r-midwest
4. "What They Call "Marriage", Pa-Pa-Yā" (off vocal) (結婚なんてさパッパヤー, Kekkon Nantesa Pa-Pa-Yā) – 3:54
5. "Marrying Age Lady" (off vocal) (適齢期なレイディ, Tekireiki na Lady) – 3:57

==== Misao Kusakabe ====
"TV Anime "Lucky Star" Character Song featuring Misao Kusakabe Vol. 013"

Single by Kaoru Mizuhara
- A-side: "Sugeen Datte Va!"
- B-side: "Dayo na 3-byō Tama ni wa 5-byō"
- Released: March 26, 2008
- Length: 17:38
- Label: Lantis

TV Anime "Lucky Star" Character Song featuring Misao Kusakabe Vol. 013 (TVアニメ『らき☆すた』キャラクターソング Vol.013 日下部みさお, TV Anime Raki Suta Kyarakutā Songu Vol. 013 Kusakabe Misao)) is the thirteenth volume of the character song albums and was released on March 26, 2008.

===== Track listing =====
1. "Sublime Va, Dude!" (すげえんだって・ヴァ!, Sugeen Datte Va!) – 3:25
  - Composition: Keiji Ayahara
  - Arrangement: Dai Murai
  - Lyrics: Aki Hata
2. "Dayo na 3-byō Tama ni wa 5-byō" (だよな3秒たまには5秒) – 4:06
  - Composition: Keiji Ayahara
  - Arrangement: Akio Kondō
  - Lyrics: Aki Hata
3. "micro Krafty datteValator/AD++" – 2:39
  - Track maker: Yasushi.K
4. "Sublime Va, Dude!" (off-vocal) (すげえんだって・ヴァ!, Sugeen Datte Va!) – 3:24
5. "Dayo na 3-byō Tama ni wa 5-byō" (off-vocal) (だよな3秒たまには5秒) – 4:03

=== Shiraishi Minoru no Otoko no Lullaby ===
TV Anime "Lucky Star" Latter Half Ending Theme Collection: Shiraishi Minoru no Otoko no Lullaby

Compilation album by Minoru Shiraishi
- Released: October 10, 2007
- Genre: Anime soundtrack
- Length: 43:29
- Label: Lantis

TV Anime "Lucky Star" Latter Half Ending Theme Collection: Shiraishi Minoru no Otoko no Lullaby (TVアニメ『らき☆すた』後半エンディングテーマ集 白石みのるの男のララバイ, TV Anime Raki☆Suta Kōhan Endingu Tēma Shū: Shiraishi Minoru no Otoko no Rarabai; lit. Minoru Shiraishi's Manly Lullaby) is an album for the anime series Lucky Star released on October 10, 2007 by Lantis and contains the ending themes from episode thirteen onwards that were sung by Minoru Shiraishi.

==== Track listing ====
1. "Ore no Wasuremono" (俺の忘れ物) - 1:30
  - Composition/Lyrics: Minoru Shiraishi
2. "Hare Hare Yukai" (ハレ晴レユカイ) - 1:30
  - Composition: Tomokazu Tashiro
  - Lyrics: Aki Hata
3. "Koi no Minoru Densetsu" (恋のミノル伝説) - 1:10
  - Composition: Satoru Kōsaki
  - Lyrics: Minoru Shiraishi
4. "Motteke! Sailor Fuku" (Aimai Sunshine ver.) (もってけ!セーラーふく（曖昧サンシャインver.）) - 1:20
  - Composition:Satoru Kōsaki
  - Lyrics: Minoru Shiraishi
5. "Kaorin no Theme" (かおりんのテーマ) - 1:30
  - Composition/Lyrics: Minoru Shiraishi
6. "Otoko no Ikizama" (男の生き様) - 1:30
  - Composition/Lyrics: Minoru Shiraishi
7. "Omuko Rumba" (お婿ルンバ) - 1:30
  - Composition/Lyrics: Minoru Shiraishi
8. "Shikaidā no Uta" (シカイダーの唄) - 1:30
  - Composition/Lyrics: Minoru Shiraishi
9. "Shiraishi Medley" (白石メドレー) - 1:30
10. "Mikuru Henshin! Soshite Sentō!" (ミクル変身!そして戦闘!) - 1:30
  - Composition: Satoru Kōsaki
11. "Ai wa Boomerang" (愛はブーメラン) - 1:30
  - Composition: Ryō Matsuda
  - Lyrics: Yoshiko Miura
12. "Ore no Wasuremono -Kanzenban-" (俺の忘れ物 -完全版-) - 5:05
  - Composition/Lyrics: Minoru Shiraishi
  - Arrangement: Satoru Kōsaki
13. "Shikaidā no Uta -Kanzenban-" (シカイダーの唄 -完全版-) - 4:19
  - Composition/Lyrics: Minoru Shiraishi
  - Arrangement: Satoru Kōsaki
14. "Kaorin no Theme -Kanzenban-" (かおりんのテーマ -完全版-) - 5:27
  - Composition/Lyrics: Minoru Shiraishi
  - Arrangement: Satoru Kōsaki
15. "Koi no Minoru Densetsu -Kanzenban-" (恋のミノル伝説 -完全版-) - 5:25
  - Composition: Satoru Kōsaki
  - Arrangement: Masaki Suzuki
  - Lyrics: Minoru Shiraishi
16. "Waga Itoshi no Santa Monica -Studio Rokuon Ban-" (我が愛しのサンタモニカ -スタジオ録音版-) - 1:31
  - Composition/Lyrics: Minoru Shiraishi
17. "Koi Shitatte Iijanai -Studio Rokuon Ban-" (恋したっていいじゃない -スタジオ録音版-) - 1:29
  - Composition/Lyrics: Minoru Shiraishi
18. "Omuko Rumba -Studio Rokuon Ban-" (お婿ルンバ -スタジオ録音版-) - 1:22
  - Composition/Lyrics: Minoru Shiraishi
19. "Otoko no Ikizama -Studio Rokuon Ban-" (男の生き様 -スタジオ録音版-) - 1:26
  - Composition/Lyrics: Minoru Shiraishi
20. "Shiraishi Minoru ~Oku San Series~" (白石みのる 〜奥さんシリーズ〜) - 0:28

=== Lucky Star Re-Mix002 ===
"TV Anime "Lucky Star" Opening Theme: Lucky Star Re-Mix002 ~"Lucky Star no Kiwami, Ahh" (Shiteyanyo)~"

Single by JAM Project, Ryosuke Nakanishi, Technoboys Pulcraft Green-Fund, A-bee, Aya Hirano, Emiri Katō, Kaori Fukuhara, Aya Endō, Hiromi Konno, Minoru Shiraishi and Satoru Kōsaki
- A-side: "JAM ga Mottetta! Sailor Fuku"
- Released: December 26, 2007
- Length: 41:52
- Label: Lantis

TV Anime "Lucky Star" Opening Theme: Lucky Star Re-Mix002 ~"Lucky Star no Kiwami, Ahh" (Shiteyanyo)~ (TVアニメ『らき☆すた』OPテーマ らき☆すたRe-Mix002〜『ラキスタノキワミ、アッー』【してやんよ】〜, Raki Suta Rimikkusu Zero Zero Tsū ~"Raki Suta no Kiwami, Ā" (Shiteyan'yo)~) is the second remix album for the anime series Lucky Star released on December 26, 2007, by Lantis. In addition to various remixes of the opening theme Motteke! Sailor Fuku (including one version sung by the group JAM Project), the album also features a compilation track featuring songs from an assortment of both the BGM & Radio Bangumi soundtracks and the character song albums.

==== Track listing ====
1. "JAM ga Mottetta! Sailor Fuku" (JAMがもってった！セーラーふく) - 4:16
  - Performed by JAM Project
  - Composition/Arrangement: Satoru Kōsaki
  - Lyrics: Aki Hata
2. "Motteke! Sailor Fuku EX.Motte[k]remix" (もってけ！セーラーふく EX.Motte[k]remix) - 4:57
  - Remixed by Technoboys Pulcraft Green-Fund
  - Composition: Satoru Kōsaki
  - Lyrics: Aki Hata
3. "Motteke! Knee Socks" (もってけ！ニーソックス) - 5:41
  - Remixed by A-bee
  - Composition: Satoru Kōsaki
  - Lyrics: Aki Hata
4. "Motteke! Sailor Fuku Electro Otome Chikku mix" (もってけ！セーラーふく Electro 乙女ちっく mix) - 5:51
  - Remixed by Ryosuke Nakanishi a.k.a. r-midwest
  - Composition: Satoru Kōsaki
  - Lyrics: Aki Hata
5. "Motteke! Sailor Fuku Bak-Bak-Bakoon! Mix" (もってけ！セーラーふく Bak-Bak-Bakoon!! mix) - 5:21
  - Remixed by Ryosuke Nakanishi a.k.a. r-midwest
  - Composition: Satoru Kōsaki
  - Lyrics: Aki Hata
6. "Musical Suite: Lucky Star Movie" (組曲「らき☆すた動画」, Kumikyoku "Raki Suta Dōga") - 15:31
  - Performed by Everyone of Lucky Star (らき☆すたのみんな, Raki Suta no Minna)
  - Composition: Satoru Kōsaki, nishi-ken, Minoru Shiraishi, Keiji Ayahara, Katsumi Tomono, Tomoki Kikuya, Tomokazu Tashiro and Kōsuke Kanai
  - Arrangement: Satoru Kōsaki
  - Lyrics: Aki Hata (, Satoru Kōsaki and Minoru Shiraishi)

=== BPM200 Rock'N'Roll Show ===
milktub 15th ANNIVERSARY BEST ALBUM BPM200 ROCK'N'ROLL SHOW is greatest hit album of milktub. Characters of Lucky Star are a guest participating in the jacket and the first song "Danshi Murimuri Daikaizō" (男子ムリムリ大改造), performed by Aya Hirano, Emiri Katō, Kaori Fukuhara and Aya Endō, lyrics by Aki Hata, composition by milktub and arrangement by ms-jacky.

=== Ai o Torimodose!! ===
""Lucky Star OVA" Theme Song: Ai o Torimodose!!"

Single by Uchōten (Hiromi Konno and Minoru Shiraishi)
- A-side: "Ai o Torimodose!!"
- B-side: "Yuria... Towa ni"
- Released: October 8, 2008
- Length: 21:32
- Label: Lantis

"Lucky Star OVA" Theme Song: Ai o Torimodose!! (『らき☆すたOVA』テーマソング 愛をとりもどせ!!, Raki☆Suta OVA Tēma Songu: Ai o Torimodose!!) is a single by Uchōten (Hiromi Konno and Minoru Shiraishi) which was used as the ending theme to the anime Lucky Star OVA. It's a cover of Fist of the North Star.

==== Track listing ====
1. "Ai o Torimodose!!" (愛をとりもどせ!!)
  - Lyrics: Kimiharu Namakura
  - Composition: Michio Yamashita
  - Arrangement: Satoru Kōsaki
2. "Yuria... Towa ni" (ユリア…永遠に)
  - Lyrics: Hidetoshi Nomoto and Masayuki Tanaka
  - Composition: Hiromi Imakiire
  - Arrangement: Nijine (Akito Matsuda)
3. "Vague Net Darling" -Uchōten MIX- (曖昧ネットだーりん 〜有頂天MIX, Aimai Netto Dārin 〜Uchōten MIX〜) - 4:14
  - Remix By A-bee
  - Composition: Satoru Kōsaki
  - Lyrics: Aki Hata
4. "Ai o Torimodose!!" (off vocal) (愛をとりもどせ!!)
5. "Yuria... Towa ni" (off vocal) (ユリア…永遠に)

=== Lucky Star Music Fair ===
TV Anime "Lucky Star": Lucky Star Music Fair

Studio album by Aya Hirano, Emiri Katō, Kaori Fukuhara, Aya Endō, Satoru Kōsaki, Hiromi Konno, Minoru Shiraishi, Tomokazu Seki and Nozomi Sasaki
- Released: October 22, 2008
- Genre: Anime soundtrack
- Length: 47:48
- Label: Lantis

TV Anime "Lucky Star": Lucky Star Music Fair (TVアニメ『らき☆すた』 らき☆すた ミュージックフェア) is a compilation album for the anime series Lucky Star released on October 22, 2008 by Lantis, containing a variety of remixes and original songs featured from the anime.

==== Track listing ====
1. "Uchōten ga Tomara nai" (有頂天がとまらない) - 4:44
  - Performed by Uchōten (Hiromi Konno and Minoru Shiraishi)
  - Lyrics: Aki Hata
  - Composition/Arrangement: Satoru Kōsaki
2. "Uchōten in da House ~Say That Hip Hop S**t!~ " (有頂天in da House 〜Say That Hip Hop S**t!〜) - 5:22
  - Performed by Uchōten (Hiromi Konno and Minoru Shiraishi)
  - Composition/Arrangement: Yasushi.K
3. "Gravity" - 4:19
  - Performed by m.o.e.v
  - Composition/Arrangement/Lyrics: Satoru Kōsaki
4. "Motteke! Sailor Fuku ~Hassha Melody~" (もってけ!セーラーふく 〜発車メロディ〜) - 0:15
  - Composition: Satoru Kōsaki
  - Arrangement: hush-a-bye baby
5. "Misoji Zaka" (三十路坂) - 4:51
  - Performed by Hiromi Konno
  - Lyrics: Aki Hata
  - Composition/Arrangement: Satoru Kōsaki
6. "Lucky Star Mush! ~DustFunk Lozik~" (らき☆すたMush! 〜DustFunk☆Lozik〜) - 5:06
  - Lyrics: Aki Hata
  - Composition: Satoru Kōsaki, Isao, Kōsuke Kanai, Yamato Itō and nishi-ken
7. "Ai daze, Tenchou!" (愛だぜ、店長!) - 4:13
  - Performed by Tomokazu Seki
  - Lyrics: Aki Hata
  - Composition/Arrangement: Satoru Kōsaki
8. "pa pa pa pa patti strike back ~Mata wa Patty wa Ika ni Shite, Shinpai Suru no o Yame Ikary~" (pa pa pa pa patti strike back〜またはパティは如何にして、心配するのを止め以下ry〜) - 4:05
  - Performed by Nozomi Sasaki
  - Composition/Arrangement: Raito
9. "Emirin no Theme" (えみりんのテーマ) - 4:40
  - Performed by Minoru Shiraishi (Minoru Shiraishi)
  - Composition/Lyrics: Minoru Shiraishi
  - Arrangement: Satoru Kōsaki
10. "Kaorin no Theme ~Hassha Melody~" (かおりんのテーマ 〜発車メロディー〜) - 0:26
  - Composition: Minoru Shiraishi
  - Arrangement: hush-a-bye baby
11. "Hebi to Kaeru" (蛇と蛙) - 4:39
  - Performed by Minoru Shiraishi
  - Composition/Lyrics: Minoru Shiraishi
  - Arrangement: Satoru Kōsaki
12. "Minna to Issho" (みんなと一緒) - 4:28
  - Performed by Minoru Shiraishi
  - Composition/Lyrics: Minoru Shiraishi
  - Arrangement: Tatsuya Kikuchi (marble)

=== Lucky Racer/Real Star ===
"Lucky☆Racer/Real Star☆"

Single by Sayaka Sasaki

from the album sympathetic world
- A-side: Lucky☆Racer; Real Star☆
- Released: June 23, 2010
- Length: 15:31
- Label: Lantis

Lucky☆Racer/Real Star☆ is a single by Sayaka Sasaki which was used as the opening and ending theme to the Variety show Lucky Racer.

==== Track listing ====
1. "Lucky☆Racer" - 4:15
  - Composition: Tatsh (Tatsuya Shimizu)
  - Arrangement: Kyō Takada
  - Lyrics: Sayaka Sasaki
2. "Real Star☆" - 3:32
  - Composition: Shunryū
  - Arrangement: Katsuyuki Harada
  - Lyrics: Sayaka Sasaki
3. "Lucky☆Racer" (off vocal) - 4:15
4. "Real Star☆" (off vocal) - 3:32

=== MAKEGUMI ===
"MAKEGUMI"

Single by Maina Shimagata and Koto Kawasaki
- A-side: "MAKEGUMI"
- B-side: "Hoshi ni Negai o"
- Released: June 19, 2013
- Length: 16:22
- Label: Lantis

MAKEGUMI is a single by Maina Shimagata and Koto Kawasaki which was used as the ending theme to the web anime Miyakawa-ke no Kūfuku.

==== Track listing ====
(All Composition/Arrangement/Lyrics: Ken'ichi Maeyamada)

1. "MAKEGUMI" - 3:53
2. "Hoshi ni Negai o" (☆に願いを; lit. Wish upon a Star) - 4:19
3. "MAKEGUMI" (off vocal) - 3:53
4. "Hoshi ni Negai o" (off vocal) (☆に願いを; lit. Wish upon a Star) - 4:17

=== KACHIGUMI ===
"KACHIGUMI"

Single by Aya Hirano and Emiri Katō
- A-side: "KACHIGUMI"
- Released: July 31, 2013
- Label: Lantis

KACHIGUMI is a single by Aya Hirano and Emiri Katō which was used as the opening theme to the web anime Miyakawa-ke no Kūfuku.

== Anime soundtracks ==
=== BGM & Radio Bangumi "Lucky Channel" soundtracks ===
==== Volume 1 ====
TV Anime "Lucky Star" BGM & Radio Bangumi "Lucky Channel" no Digest o ShŪroku Shita Special CD 1

Soundtrack album by Satoru Kōsaki, Hiromi Konno and Minoru Shiraishi
- Released: June 22, 2007
- Genre: Anime soundtrack (Radio)
- Label: Kadokawa Entertainment

TV Anime "Lucky Star" BGM & Radio Bangumi "Lucky Channel" no Digest o ShŪroku Shita Special CD 1 (BGM&ラジオ番組「らっきー☆ちゃんねる」のダイジェストを収録したスペシャルCD1) is the first such album containing background music tracks and radio segments from the anime version of Lucky Star, which was released on June 22, 2007 with the first DVD. The first five tracks are BGM tracks from the anime, all composition are Satoru Kōsaki, and the last six are from radio segments from Radio Program "Lucky Channel" with Hiromi Konno as Akira Kogami and Minoru Shiraishi as himself.

===== Track listing =====
1. "Fun Fun Fun dayo, Lucky Star" (フンフンフン♪だよ、らき☆すた)
2. "Ran Ran Ran dayo, Lucky Star" (ランランラン♪だよ、らき☆すた)
3. "Unchiku dayo, Lucky Star" (うんちくだよ、らき☆すた)
4. "Konata no Theme, Futsū Version" (こなたのテーマ、普通バージョン)
5. "Kōken Battle, Satoru Ganbatta" (鋼拳バトル、暁がんばった)
6. "Anime Dai 1 Kai Hōsōbun no Atoni..." (アニメ第1回放送分のあとに…)
7. "Producer Kara no Shirei Sono 1" (プロデューサーからの指令 その1)
8. "Iiwake no Tensai" (言い訳の天才)
9. "Anime Dai 2 Kai Hōsōbun no Atoni..." (アニメ第2回放送分のあとに…)
10. "Producer Kara no Shirei Sono 2" (プロデューサーからの指令 その2)
11. "Moshimo de Lucky Channel" (もしもでらっきー☆ちゃんねる)

==== Volume 2 ====
TV Anime "Lucky Star" BGM & Radio Bangumi "Lucky Channel" no Digest o ShŪroku Shita Special CD 2

Soundtrack album by Satoru Kōsaki, Hiromi Konno and Minoru Shiraishi
- Released: July 27, 2007
- Genre: Anime soundtrack (Radio)
- Label: Kadokawa Entertainment

TV Anime "Lucky Star" BGM & Radio Bangumi "Lucky Channel" no Digest o ShŪroku Shita Special CD 2 (BGM&ラジオ番組「らっきー☆ちゃんねる」のダイジェストを収録したスペシャルCD2) is the second such album containing background music tracks and radio segments from the anime version of Lucky Star, which was released on July 27, 2007 with the second DVD. The first six tracks are BGM tracks from the anime, all composition are Satoru Kōsaki, and the last six are from radio segments from Radio Program "Lucky Channel" with Hiromi Konno as Akira Kogami and Minoru Shiraishi as himself.

===== Track listing =====
1. "Lucky Channel no Theme" (らっきー☆ちゃんねるのテーマ)
2. "Jikai Yokoku dayo, Lucky Star" (次回予告だよ、らき☆すた)
3. "Marsh & Mallow" (マッシー&マーロー)
4. "Yukai da ne, Lucky Star" (愉快だね、らき☆すた)
5. "Ga-cen de Catch da ne, Lucky Star" (ゲーセンでキャッチだね、らき☆すた)
6. "Haisha o Nerae!, Satoru Funbatta" (歯医者をねらえ!、暁ふんばった)
7. "Anime Dai 3 Kai Hōsōbun no Atoni..." (アニメ第3回放送分のあとに…)
8. "Producer Kara no Shirei Sono 3" (プロデューサーからの指令 その3)
9. "Iiwake no Tensai" (言い訳の天才)
10. "Anime Dai 4 Kai Hōsōbun no Atoni..." (アニメ第4回放送分のあとに…)
11. "Producer Kara no Shirei Sono 4" (プロデューサーからの指令 その4)
12. "Idol no Tatemae to Honne ~ Ending" (アイドルのタテマエとホンネ〜エンディング)

==== Volume 3 ====
TV Anime "Lucky Star" BGM & Radio Bangumi "Lucky Channel" no Digest o ShŪroku Shita Special CD 3

Soundtrack album by Satoru Kōsaki, m.o.e.v, Hiromi Konno and Minoru Shiraishi
- Released: August 24, 2007
- Genre: Anime soundtrack (Radio)
- Label: Kadokawa Entertainment

TV Anime "Lucky Star" BGM & Radio Bangumi "Lucky Channel" no Digest o ShŪroku Shita Special CD 3 (BGM&ラジオ番組「らっきー☆ちゃんねる」のダイジェストを収録したスペシャルCD3) is the third such album containing background music tracks and radio segments from the anime version of Lucky Star, which was released on August 24, 2007 with the third DVD. The first seven tracks are BGM tracks from the anime, all composition are Satoru Kōsaki, and the last six are from radio segments from Radio Program "Lucky Channel" with Hiromi Konno as Akira Kogami and Minoru Shiraishi as himself.

===== Track listing =====
1. "Gravity"
  - Performed by m.o.e.v
  - Composition/Arrangement/Lyrics: Satoru Kōsaki
2. "Drive dayo, Lucky Star" (ドライブだよ、らき☆すた)
3. "Umi desu nā, Umi desu nē" (海ですなぁ、海ですねぇ)
4. "Nangoku Kaze desu ga, Nani ka" (南国風ですが、何か)
5. "Kaidan no Kyōfu" (怪談の恐怖)
6. "Gyaaaaaaaaa" (ぎゃああああああああ)
7. "Kore de Enya, Satoru no Kunō" (これでエンヤ、暁の苦悩)
8. "Anime Dai 5 Kai Hōsōbun no Atoni..." (アニメ第5回放送分のあとに…)
9. "Producer Kara no Shirei Sono 5" (プロデューサーからの指令その5)
10. "Iiwake no Tensai" (言い訳の天才)
11. "Anime Dai 6 Kiai Hōsōbun no Atoni..." (アニメ第6回放送分のあとに…)
12. "Producer Kara no Shirei Sono 6" (プロデューサーからの指令その6)
13. "Moshimo de Lucky Channel" (もしもdeらっきー☆ちゃんねる)

==== Volume 4 ====
TV Anime "Lucky Star" BGM & Radio Bangumi "Lucky Channel" no Digest o ShŪroku Shita Special CD 4

Soundtrack album by Satoru Kōsaki, Hiromi Konno and Minoru Shiraishi
- Released: September 28, 2007
- Genre: Anime soundtrack (Radio)
- Label: Kadokawa Entertainment

TV Anime "Lucky Star" BGM & Radio Bangumi "Lucky Channel" no Digest o ShŪroku Shita Special CD 4 (BGM&ラジオ番組「らっきー☆ちゃんねる」のダイジェストを収録したスペシャルCD4) is the fourth such album containing background music tracks and radio segments from the anime version of Lucky Star, which was released on September 28, 2007 with the fourth DVD. The first five tracks are BGM tracks from the anime, all composition are Satoru Kōsaki with the exception of what is noted, and the last six are from radio segments from Radio Program "Lucky Channel" with Hiromi Konno as Akira Kogami and Minoru Shiraishi as himself.

===== Track listing =====
1. "Tattatakatā dayo, Lucky Star" (タッタタカターだよ、らき☆すた)
2. "Karoyaka dayo, Lucky Star" (軽やかだよ、らき☆すた)
3. "Tanoshiku Genki no Yoi Kyoku o Satoru Sensei ga Tsukuri Mashita" (楽しく元気の良い曲を暁先生が作りました)
4. "Konata no Theme, Chūkintō Version" (こなたのテーマ、中近東バージョン)
5. "Taiikusai desu yo" (体育祭ですよ)
6. "Tsukasa no Heppoko Hurdle Kyōsō" (つかさのヘッポコハードル競争)
7. "Tsukasa no Recorder Ensō" (つかさのリコーダー演奏)
  - Tracks Suite: Joy to the World, Twinkle Twinkle Little Star
  - Arrangement: Satoru Kōsaki
8. "Kagami no Recorder Ensō" (かがみのリコーダー演奏)
  - Tracks Suite: Twinkle Twinkle Little Star
  - Arrangement: Satoru Kōsaki
9. "Anime Dai 7 Kai Hōsōbun no Ato ni..." (アニメ第7回放送分のあとに…)
10. "Producer Kara no Shimei Sono 7" (プロデューサーからの指令その7)
11. "Point Kasan Luckies" (ポイント加算らっきーず)
12. "Anime Dai 8 Kai Hōsōbun no Ato ni..." (アニメ第8回放送分のあとに…)
13. "Producer Kara no Shimei Sono 8" (プロデューサーからの指令その8)
14. "Moshimo De Lucky Channel ~ Ending" (もしもdeらっきー☆ちゃんねる〜エンディング)

==== Volume 5 ====
TV Anime "Lucky Star" BGM & Radio Bangumi "Lucky Channel" no Digest o ShŪroku Shita Special CD 5

Soundtrack album by Satoru Kōsaki, Hiromi Konno and Minoru Shiraishi
- Released: October 26, 2007
- Genre: Anime soundtrack (Radio)
- Label: Kadokawa Entertainment

TV Anime "Lucky Star" BGM & Radio Bangumi "Lucky Channel" no Digest o ShŪroku Shita Special CD 5 (BGM&ラジオ番組「らっきー☆ちゃんねる」のダイジェストを収録したスペシャルCD5) is the fifth such album containing background music tracks and radio segments from the anime version of Lucky Star, which was released on October 26, 2007 with the fifth DVD. The first five tracks are BGM tracks from the anime, all composition are Satoru Kōsaki with the exception of what is noted, and the last six are from radio segments from Radio Program "Lucky Channel" with Hiromi Konno as Akira Kogami and Minoru Shiraishi as himself.

===== Track listing =====
1. "Bunguster" (バンガスター)
2. "Fun Fun Guitar dayo, Lucky Star" (フンフンギターだよ、らき☆すた)
3. "Skip Skip dayo, Lucky Star" (スキップスキップだよ、らき☆すた)
4. "Konata no Theme, Okinawa Version" (こなたのテーマ、沖縄バージョン)
5. "Mariya Sama ga Miteru Kamo Shirenai" (マリヤ様がみてるかもしれない)
6. "Filna Fatansy" (ファイルナファタンジー)
7. "Hare Hare Yukai (Konata no Chaku Mero)" (ハレ晴レユカイ（こなたの着メロ）)
  - Composition: Tomokazu Tashiro
  - Arrangement: Satoru Kōsaki
8. "Pachelbel no Canon (Tsukasa no Chaku Mero)" (パッヘルベルのカノン（つかさの着メロ）)
  - Composition: Johann Pachelbel
  - Arrangement: Satoru Kōsaki
9. "Anime Dai 9 Kai Hōsōbun no Ato ni..." (アニメ第9回放送分のあとに…)
10. "Producer Kara no Shimei Sono 9" (プロデューサーからの指令その9)
11. "Point Kasan Luckies" (ポイント加算らっきーず)
12. "Anime Dai 10 Kai Hōsōbun no Ato ni..." (アニメ第10回放送分のあとに…)
13. "Producer Kara no Shimei Sono 10" (プロデューサーからの指令その10)
14. "Moshimo De Lucky Channel ~ Ending" (もしもdeらっきー☆ちゃんねる〜エンディング)

==== Volume 6 ====
TV Anime "Lucky Star" BGM & Radio Bangumi "Lucky Channel" no Digest o ShŪroku Shita Special CD 6

Soundtrack album by Satoru Kōsaki, Hiromi Konno and Minoru Shiraishi
- Released: November 22, 2007
- Genre: Anime soundtrack (Radio)
- Label: Kadokawa Entertainment

TV Anime "Lucky Star" BGM & Radio Bangumi "Lucky Channel" no Digest o ShŪroku Shita Special CD 6 (BGM&ラジオ番組「らっきー☆ちゃんねる」のダイジェストを収録したスペシャルCD6) is the sixth such album containing background music tracks and radio segments from the anime version of Lucky Star, which was released on November 22, 2007 with the sixth DVD. The first six tracks are BGM tracks from the anime, all composition are Satoru Kōsaki, and the last six are from radio segments from Radio Program "Lucky Channel" with Hiromi Konno as Akira Kogami and Minoru Shiraishi as himself.

===== Track listing =====
1. "Bubbu Bubbu Bū dane, Lucky Star" (ぶっぶぶっぶぶーだね、らき☆すた)
2. "Setsunaki Jikan" (切なき時間)
3. "1974"
4. "Keisai, Sore wa Kandō" (掲載、それは感動)
5. "Senjō no Ariake" (戦場の有明)
6. "Oshōgatsu dayo, Lucky Star" (お正月だよ、らき☆すた)
7. "Anime Dai 11 Kai Hōsōbun no Atoni" (アニメ第11回放送分のあとに…)
8. "Producer Kara no Shirei Sono 11" (プロデューサーからの指令その11)
9. "Shiraishi, Akira Sama ni Omiyage o Katte Kuru" (白石、あきら様におみやげを買ってくる)
10. "Anime Dai 12 Kai Houshou Bun no Ato ni" (アニメ第12回放送分のあとに…)
11. "Producer Kara no Shirei Sono 12" (プロデューサーからの指令その12)
12. "Otayori Goshōkai ~ Ending" (お便りご紹介〜エンディング)

==== Volume 7 ====
TV Anime "Lucky Star" BGM & Radio Bangumi "Lucky Channel" no Digest o ShŪroku Shita Special CD 7

Soundtrack album by Satoru Kōsaki, Hiromi Konno and Minoru Shiraishi
- Released: December 21, 2007
- Genre: Anime soundtrack (Radio)
- Label: Kadokawa Entertainment

TV Anime "Lucky Star" BGM & Radio Bangumi "Lucky Channel" no Digest o ShŪroku Shita Special CD 7 (BGM&ラジオ番組「らっきー☆ちゃんねる」のダイジェストを収録したスペシャルCD7) is the seventh such album containing background music tracks and radio segments from the anime version of Lucky Star, which was released on December 21, 2007 with the seventh DVD. The first six tracks are BGM tracks from the anime, all composition are Satoru Kōsaki, and the last six are from radio segments from Radio Program "Lucky Channel" with Hiromi Konno as Akira Kogami and Minoru Shiraishi as himself.

===== Track listing =====
1. "Yutaka no Theme" (ゆたかのテーマ)
2. "Zutto Satoru no Turn" (ずっと暁のターン)
3. "Kagami Kyun" (かがみキュン)
4. "Saigo no Kotae de Yoi Desuka?" (最後の答えで良いですか?)
5. "Beer no CM ppoi Kyoku o Tsukuttemita" (ビールのCMっぽい曲を作ってみた)
6. "L-Gamui" (エルガムイ)
7. "Lucky Star Figure Ka Keikaku Saishin Jouhō" (らき☆すたフィギュア化計画最新情報)
8. "Producer Kara no Shimei Sono 13" (プロデューサーからの指令その13)
9. "Otayori Goshōkai ~ Point Kasan Luckies" (お便りご紹介〜ポイント加算らっきーず)
10. "Anime Dai 14 Kai Hōsōbun no ato ni..." (アニメ第14回放送分のあとに…)
11. "Producer Kara no Shimei Sono 14" (プロデューサーからの指令その14)
12. "Moshimo de Lucky Channel ~ Ending" (もしもdeらっきー☆ちゃんねる〜エンディング)

==== Volume 8 ====
TV Anime "Lucky Star" BGM & Radio Bangumi "Lucky Channel" no Digest o ShŪroku Shita Special CD 8

Soundtrack album by Satoru Kōsaki, Hiromi Konno and Minoru Shiraishi
- Released: January 25, 2008
- Genre: Anime soundtrack (Radio)
- Label: Kadokawa Entertainment

TV Anime "Lucky Star" BGM & Radio Bangumi "Lucky Channel" no Digest o ShŪroku Shita Special CD 8 (BGM&ラジオ番組「らっきー☆ちゃんねる」のダイジェストを収録したスペシャルCD8) is the eighth such album containing background music tracks and radio segments from the anime version of Lucky Star, which was released with the eighth DVD. The first seven tracks are BGM tracks from the anime, all composition are Satoru Kōsaki, and the last six are from radio segments from Radio Program "Lucky Channel" with Hiromi Konno as Akira Kogami and Minoru Shiraishi as himself.

===== Track listing =====
1. "Minami no Theme" (みなみのテーマ)
2. "Hiyori no Mōsō" (ひよりの妄想)
3. "1 Nen Sei wa Fresh da nē" (1年生はフレッシュだねぇ)
4. "Sawayaka na Yūjō" (爽やかな友情)
5. "Kagami Dake Chigau Class ni Nachatta..." (かがみだけ違うクラスになっちゃった…)
6. "Sōjirō Henshin!" (そうじろう変身!)
7. "Hontō ni Kowai Katei no Igaku" (本当に怖い家庭の医学)
8. "Doppelganger? Jishū, Akira Sama no Live?" (ドッペルゲンガー?次週、あきら様のライブ?)
9. "Natsuyasumi ni Tsuite Yuruyuru to Talk" (夏休みについてゆるゆるとトーク)
10. "Point Kasan Luckies" (ポイント加算らっきーず)
11. "Anime Dai 16 Kai Hōsōbun no Ato ni..." (アニメ第16回放送分のあとに…)
12. "Shiraishi Kun no Ending ga Dai Kōhyō!?" (白石君のエンディングが大好評!?)
13. "Moshi mo de Lucky Channel ~ Ending" (もしもdeらっきー☆ちゃんねる〜エンディング)

==== Volume 9 ====
TV Anime "Lucky Star" BGM & Radio Bangumi "Lucky Channel" no Digest o ShŪroku Shita Special CD 9

Soundtrack album by Satoru Kōsaki, Hiromi Konno, Minoru Shiraishi and Tomokazu Seki
- Released: February 22, 2008
- Genre: Anime soundtrack (Radio)
- Label: Kadokawa Entertainment

TV Anime "Lucky Star" BGM & Radio Bangumi "Lucky Channel" no Digest o ShŪroku Shita Special CD 9 (BGM&ラジオ番組「らっきー☆ちゃんねる」のダイジェストを収録したスペシャルCD9) is the ninth such album containing background music tracks and radio segments from the anime version of Lucky Star, which was released with the ninth DVD. The first eight tracks are BGM tracks from the anime, all composition are Satoru Kōsaki, and the last six are from radio segments from Radio Program "Lucky Channel" with Hiromi Konno as Akira Kogami and Minoru Shiraishi as himself.

===== Track listing =====
1. "Patty no Theme" (パティのテーマ)
2. "Heiwa da na, Lucky Star" (平和だな、らき☆すた)
3. "Iraira Kagamin" (イライラかがみん)
4. "Hiiragi 4 Shimai" (柊四姉妹)
5. "24 Jikan" (24時間)
6. "Leotard 3 Shimai Bijin Dorobō" (レオタード3姉妹美人泥棒)
7. "Kōfun Track" (興奮トラック)
8. "Full Metal Panique" (フルメタパニーク)
9. "Shiraishi Kun no ending, dō na no?" (白石くんのエンディング、どうなの?)
10. "Anizawa Meito, Studio ni Rannyū! ~ Producer Kara no Toikake Sono 1" (兄沢命斗、スタジオに乱入!〜プロデューサーからの問いかけ その1)
11. "Anime Tenchō to tomo ni, Point Kasan Luckies" (アニメ店長とともに、ポイント加算らっきーず)
12. "Anime Dai 18 Kai Hōsōbun no Ato ni... Te iu ka Atsukurushii Yo." (アニメ第18回放送分のあとに…ていうか暑苦しいよ。)
13. "Shiraishi Kun no ending ga Daikōhyō!?" (白石くんのエンディングが大好評!?)
14. "Moshimo de Lucky Channel ~ Ending" (もしもdeらっきー☆ちゃんねる〜エンディング)

===== Cast (Radio) =====
- Akira Kogami - Hiromi Konno
- Minoru Shiraishi - Minoru Shiraishi
- Meito Anizawa - Tomokazu Seki

==== Volume 10 ====
TV Anime "Lucky Star" BGM & Radio Bangumi "Lucky Channel" no Digest o ShŪroku Shita Special CD 10

Soundtrack album by Satoru Kōsaki, Hiromi Konno, Minoru Shiraishi and Daisuke Ono
- Released: March 21, 2008
- Genre: Anime soundtrack (Radio)
- Label: Kadokawa Entertainment

TV Anime "Lucky Star" BGM & Radio Bangumi "Lucky Channel" no Digest o ShŪroku Shita Special CD 10 (BGM&ラジオ番組「らっきー☆ちゃんねる」のダイジェストを収録したスペシャルCD10) is the tenth album containing background music tracks and radio segments from the anime version of Lucky Star, which was released with the tenth DVD. The first nine tracks are BGM tracks from the anime, all composition are Satoru Kōsaki, and the last six are from radio segments from Radio Program "Lucky Channel" with Hiromi Konno as Akira Kogami and Minoru Shiraishi as himself.

===== Track listing =====
1. "Girlge ~Asa no Fūkei~" (ギャルゲ〜朝の風景〜)
2. "Girlge ~Lunch Tabeyo~" (ギャルゲ〜ランチ食べよ〜)
3. "Girlge ~Isshoni Kaerō~" (ギャルゲ〜一緒に帰ろう〜)
4. "Girlge ~Shukudai Yannasai!~" (ギャルゲ〜宿題やんなさい！〜)
5. "Girlge ~Betsu ni Anta no Shinpai Nanka Shitenaindakara ne~" (ギャルゲ〜別にあんたの心配なんてしてないんだからね〜)
6. "Girlge ~Suki ni Shite ii yo~" (ギャルゲ〜好きにしていいよ〜)
7. "Futsū no Nomimono ni wa Kyōmi Arimasen! Ijō!" (普通の飲み物には興味ありません!以上!)
8. "1 Nen Sei wa Fresh da nē" (1年生はフレッシュだねぇ)
9. "Itsumo no Kanji" (いつもの感じ)
10. "Are Shiraishi, Fuji no Jukai ni Ittanja?" (あれ?白石富士の樹海に行ったんじゃ?)
11. "Ichioku yen no Osatsu no Katachi no [Noshiika] no Omiyage ~ Futsuota" (一億円のお札の形の「のしいか」のおみやげ?〜ふつおた)
12. "Noshiika Tabenagara, Point Kasan Luckies" (のしいか食べながら、ポイント加算らっきーず)
13. "Anime Dai 20 Kai Hōsōbun no Ato ni... Ono Daisuke San Tōjō!" (アニメ第20回放送分のあとに…小野大輔さん登場!)
14. "Shin Assistant Ono San to Tanoshii Talk!" (新アシスタント小野さんと楽しいトーク!)
15. "Shiraishi no Chūkei? Moshimo de Lucky Channel ~ Ending" (白石の中継?もしもdeらっきー☆ちゃんねる〜エンディング)

===== Cast (Radio) =====
- Akira Kogami - Hiromi Konno
- Minoru Shiraishi - Minoru Shiraishi
- Daisuke Ono - Daisuke Ono

==== Volume 11 ====
TV Anime "Lucky Star" BGM & Radio Bangumi "Lucky Channel" no Digest o ShŪroku Shita Special CD 11

Soundtrack album by Satoru Kōsaki, Hiromi Konno, Minoru Shiraishi, Daisuke Ono, Sigeru Saitō, Keisuke Sugawara, Emiri Katō and Kaori Fukuhara
- Released: April 25, 2008
- Genre: Anime soundtrack (Radio)
- Label: Kadokawa Entertainment

TV Anime "Lucky Star" BGM & Radio Bangumi "Lucky Channel" no Digest o ShŪroku Shita Special CD 11 (BGM&ラジオ番組「らっきー☆ちゃんねる」のダイジェストを収録したスペシャルCD11) is the eleventh album containing background music tracks and radio segments from the anime version of Lucky Star, which was released with the eleventh DVD. The first six tracks are BGM tracks from the anime, all composition are Satoru Kōsaki, and the last six are from radio segments from Radio Program "Lucky Channel" with Hiromi Konno as Akira Kogami and Minoru Shiraishi as himself.

===== Track listing =====
1. "Sentimental Shūgaku Ryokō ~Chotto Hayai~" (センチメンタル修学旅行〜ちょっと速い〜)
2. "Sentimental Shūgaku Ryokō ~Chotto Osoi~" (センチメンタル修学旅行〜ちょっと遅い〜)
3. "Sentimental Shūgaku Ryokō ~Narappoi~" (センチメンタル修学旅行〜奈良っぽい〜)
4. "Kagami no Hatsukoi" (かがみの初恋)
5. "Ginga Shiraishi" (銀河白石)
6. "Kanata no Theme" (かなたのテーマ)
7. "Konkai mo Ono San to Futari de Hōsō... To omottara?" (今回も小野さんと二人で放送…と思ったら?)
8. "Jukai Kara Kaettekita Shiraishi Kun o Mushi Shinagara Ono San to Talk" (樹海から帰ってきた白石くんを無視しながら小野さんとトーク。)
9. "Shiraishi Kun o Mushi Shinagara [Point Kasan Luckies]." (白石くんを無視しながら「ポイント加算らっきーず」。)
10. "Akira Sama mo Shiraishi Kun mo Shissō! Sā, Dō naru!?" (あきら様も白石くんも失踪! さあ、どうなる!?)
11. "Hiiragi Shimai no Yuruyuru Talk Sono 1" (柊姉妹のゆるゆるトーク その1)
12. "Hiiragi Shimai no Yuruyuru Talk Sono 2" (柊姉妹のゆるゆるトーク その2)

===== Cast (Radio) =====
- Akira Kogami - Hiromi Konno
- Minoru Shiraishi - Minoru Shiraishi
- Daisuke Ono - Daisuke Ono
- Sigeru Saitō (Director)
- Keisuke Sugawara (Assistant Producer)
- Kagami Hiiragi - Emiri Katō
- Tsukasa Hiiragi - Kaori Fukuhara

==== Volume 12 ====
TV Anime "Lucky Star" BGM & Radio Bangumi "Lucky Channel" no Digest o ShŪroku Shita Special CD 12

Soundtrack album by Satoru Kōsaki, Hiromi Konno, Minoru Shiraishi, Kaoru Mizuhara, Emiri Katō, Kaori Fukuhara, Yasuhiro Takemoto and Cherry
- Released: May 23, 2008
- Genre: Anime soundtrack (Radio)
- Label: Kadokawa Entertainment

TV Anime "Lucky Star" BGM & Radio Bangumi "Lucky Channel" no Digest o ShŪroku Shita Special CD 12 (BGM&ラジオ番組「らっきー☆ちゃんねる」のダイジェストを収録したスペシャルCD12) is the twelfth such album containing background music tracks and radio segments from the anime version of Lucky Star, which was released on May 23, 2008 with the twelfth DVD. The first eleven tracks are BGM tracks from the anime, all composition are Satoru Kōsaki, and the last seven are from radio segments from Radio Program "Lucky Channel" with Hiromi Konno as Akira Kogami and Minoru Shiraishi as himself.

===== Track listing =====
1. "Kyou no Oinu Sama" (今日のお犬様)
2. "Bunkasai wa Junbi ga Ichiban Tanoshii" (文化祭は準備が一番楽しい)
3. "Zutto Bunkasai no Junbi o Shiteitai" (ずっと文化祭の準備をしていたい)
4. "Raidge Racer" (ライジレーサー)
5. "Bakudan Kun Land" (爆弾くんランド)
6. "Satoru to Kyozou" (サトルと巨像)
7. "SoulCabulir" (ソウルキャバリエ)
8. "ACE BATTLE"
9. "Moso Huso" (モソハソ)
10. "Gyouken 5" (暁拳5)
11. "Atarashii Kaze" (新しい風)
12. "Tsui ni Shiraishi ga Main Navigator ni! Assistant wa?" (ついに白石がメインナビゲーターに!アシスタントは?)
13. ""Guest" to Shite Kogami Akira Tōjō!" (「ゲスト」として小神あきら登場!)
14. "Akira Sama ga "Misoji Misaki" ni Tsuite Kataru!" (あきら様が「三十路岬」について語る!)
15. ""Lucky Star - Saishūkai" ga Owatte..." (「らき☆すた・最終回」が終わって…)
16. "Saigo no Yuruyuru Talk" (最後のゆるゆるトーク)
17. "Moshimo de Lucky Channel FINAL" (もしもdeらっきー☆ちゃんねる・ファイナル)
18. "Lucky Channel Saishūkai Special - Yattoko Kōkai Rokuon 24fun - Ai wa Minoru o Sukuu!?" (らっきー☆ちゃんねる最終回スペシャル・やっとこ公開録音24分・愛はみのるを救う!?)

===== Cast (Radio) =====
- Akira Kogami - Hiromi Konno
- Minoru Shiraishi - Minoru Shiraishi
- Misao Kusakabe - Kaoru Mizuhara
- Kagami Hiiragi - Emiri Katō
- Tsukasa Hiiragi - Kaori Fukuhara
- Yasuhiro Takemoto
- Cherry (Kagami Yoshimizu's family dog)

=== Lucky Star OVA BGM soundtrack ===
"Lucky Star OVA (Original na Visual to Animation)" Shokai Seisan Bun Tokuten: Kono OVA no Tame ni Tokubetsu ni Atarashiku Rokuon Shita BGM Shū

Soundtrack album by Satoru Kōsaki and Kaori Fukuhara
- Released: September 26, 2008
- Genre: Anime soundtrack
- Label: Kadokawa Entertainment

"Lucky Star OVA (Original na Visual to Animation)" Shokai Seisan Bun Tokuten: Kono OVA no Tame ni Tokubetsu ni Atarashiku Rokuon Shita BGM Shū (『らき☆すたOVA（オリジナルなビジュアルとアニメーション）』 初回生産分特典 このOVAのために特別に新しく録音したBGM集) is the album containing background music tracks from the Lucky Star OVA, which was released on September 26, 2008 with the Lucky Star OVA DVD. All composition are Satoru Kōsaki with the exception of what is noted.

==== Track listing ====
1. "Cherry Chan" (チェリーちゃん)
2. "Yasuragi Cherry Chan" (安らぎチェリーちゃん)
3. "Truaka ~Field~" (トルアーカ 〜フィールド〜)
4. "Truaka ~Town~" (トルアーカ 〜街〜)
5. "Truaka ~Tower~" (トルアーカ 〜塔〜)
6. "Truaka ~Battle~" (トルアーカ 〜戦闘〜)
7. "Truaka ~Anime Tenchō~" (トルアーカ 〜アニメ店長〜)
8. "Tenka Ippin Butōkai" (天下一品武闘会)
9. "Nekketsu Volley" (熱血バレー)
10. "Tsukasa Ganbaru" (つかさ頑張る)
11. "Tsukasa no Akogare" (つかさの憧れ)
12. "Attack No. 1 no Theme" (アタックNo.1のテーマ)
  - Performed by Kaori Fukuhara
  - Lyrics: Tokyo Movie Planning Department
  - Composition: Takeo Watanabe
  - Arrangement: Satoru Kōsaki
13. "Kimyō na Dreamer" (奇妙なドリーマー)

== Drama CD ==
=== Drama CD Lucky Star ===
Drama CD Lucky Star

Studio album by eleven voice actresses
- Released: August 24, 2005
- Genre: Drama
- Label: Frontier Works

Drama CD Lucky Star (ドラマCD らき☆すた, Dorama CD Raki☆Suta) is a drama CD based on the manga Lucky Star which was first released on August 24, 2005 in Japan.

==== Track listing ====
1. "Natsu da, Comic Fes da, "Lucky Star" da!" (夏だ,コミフェだ,「らき☆すた」だっ!)
2. "Natsuyasumi no Sugosikata, Sono Kōsatu" (夏休みの過ごし方,その考察)
3. "Typhoon ni Tsuite, Bunkasai ni Tsuite" (台風について,文化祭について)
4. "Bunkasai ni wa Cosplay wo, Sore Igai demo Cosplay wo" (文化祭にはコスプレを,それ以外でもコスプレを)
5. "Fuyu no Comic Fes ni wa Shin Chara ga Yoku Niau" (冬のコミフェには新キャラがよく似合う)
6. "Shinnen ni Negai o, Miko San ni Negai o" (新年に願いを,巫女さんに願いを)
7. "Nyūgaku Shiken no Saki ni wa, Haru no Shin Bangumi (Anime)" (入学試験の先には,春の新番組(アニメ))
8. "Haru: Aratana Deai, Aratana Seikatsu" (春・新たな出会い,新たな生活)
9. "Tomodachi no Yasashisa, Kazoku no Kibishisa" (友達の優しさ,家族の厳しさ)
10. "Nakayosi, Shimai, Nomi Tomodachi" (仲良し・姉妹・呑み友達)
11. "Omake de Machi ni Detemiyou!" (オマケで街に出てみよう!)"
12. "(Cast comments)" (（キャストコメント）)

==== Cast ====
- Konata Izumi - Ryō Hirohashi
- Tsukasa Hiiragi - Mai Nakahara
- Kagami Hiiragi - Ami Koshimizu
- Miyuki Takara - Erina Nakayama
- Nanako Kuroi - Masumi Asano
- Yui Narumi - Chiwa Saito
- Yutaka Kobayakawa - Ai Shimizu
- Minami Iwasaki - Miyu Matsuki
- Patricia Martin - Satsuki Yukino
- Station staff - Motoyuki Kawahara
- Event staff - Katsuya Miyamoto

=== Lucky Star Moe Drill: Shudaika Iri Drama CD ===
"Lucky Star Moe Drill" DX Pack Fūnyū Tokuten: Shudaika Iri Drama CD

Studio album by nine voice actresses
- Released: December 1, 2005
- Genre: Drama
- Label: Kadokawa Entertainment

"Lucky Star Moe Drill" DX Pack Fūnyū Tokuten: Shudaika Iri Drama CD (らき☆すた 萌えドリル DXパック封入特典 主題歌入りドラマCD) is a drama CD based on the video game Lucky Star Moe Drill which was first released on December 1, 2005 with the game package in Japan.

==== Cast ====
- Konata Izumi - Ryō Hirohashi
- Tsukasa Hiiragi - Mai Nakahara
- Kagami Hiiragi - Ami Koshimizu
- Miyuki Takara - Erina Nakayama
- Yutaka Kobayakawa - Ai Shimizu
- Minami Iwasaki - Miyu Matsuki
- Patricia Martin - Satsuki Yukino
- Hinata Miyakawa - Mamiko Noto
- Hikage Miyakawa - Yukari Tamura

=== Shin Lucky☆Star Moe Drill ~Tabidachi~: Original Drama CD ===
"Shin Lucky☆Star Moe Drill ~Tabidachi~" DX Pack Fūnyū Tokuten: Original Drama CD

Studio album by ten voice actresses
- Released: May 24, 2007
- Genre: Drama
- Label: Kadokawa Entertainment

"Shin Lucky☆Star Moe Drill ~Tabidachi~" DX Pack Fūnyū Tokuten: Original Drama CD (真・らき☆すた 萌えドリル 〜旅立ち〜 DXパック封入特典 オリジナルドラマCD) is a drama CD based on the video game Shin Lucky☆Star Moe Drill ~Tabidachi~ which was first released on May 24, 2007 with the game package in Japan.

==== Cast ====
- Konata Izumi - Ryō Hirohashi
- Kagami Hiiragi - Ami Koshimizu
- Miyuki Takara - Erina Nakayama
- Misao Kusakabe - Mikako Takahashi
- Ayano Minegishi - Yūko Gotō
- Yutaka Kobayakawa - Ai Shimizu
- Minami Iwasaki - Miyu Matsuki
- Hiyori Tamura - Ryōko Shintani
- Hikaru Sakuraba - Yuki Matsuoka
- Akira Kogami - Ai Nonaka

=== Lucky Star Drama CD (Drama ga Complete na Disk) ===
TV Anime "Lucky Star" Drama CD (Drama ga Complete na Disk)

Studio album by twenty four voice actresses
- Released: August 27, 2008
- Genre: Drama
- Label: Lantis

TV Anime "Lucky Star" Drama CD (Drama ga Complete na Disk) (TVアニメ『らき☆すた』ドラマCD（ドラマがコンプリートなディスク）, Dorama CD Raki☆Suta) is a drama CD based on the TV anime Lucky Star which was first released on August 27, 2008 in Japan.

==== Cast ====
- Konata Izumi - Aya Hirano
- Kagami Hiiragi - Emiri Katō
- Tsukasa Hiiragi - Kaori Fukuhara
- Miyuki Takara - Aya Endō
- Yutaka Kobayakawa - Shizuka Hasegawa
- Minami Iwasaki - Minori Chihara
- Hiyori Tamura - Kaori Shimizu
- Patricia Martin - Nozomi Sasaki
- Misao Kusakabe - Kaoru Mizuhara
- Ayano Minegishi - Mai Aizawa
- Yui Narumi - Saori Nishihara
- Sōjirō Izumi - Hirokazu Hiramatsu
- Tadao Hiiragi - Tōru Furusawa
- Miki Hiiragi - Kikuko Inoue
- Inori Hiiragi - Nozomi Masu
- Matsuri Hiiragi - Satomi Akesaka
- Hikage Miyakawa - Yui Kano
- Hinata Miyakawa - Sachiko Takaguchi
- Hikaru Sakuraba - Miki Inoue
- Akira Kogami - Hiromi Konno
- Minoru Shiraishi - Minoru Shiraishi
- Other - Fumihiko Tachiki, Kujira

=== Lucky Star: Ryōō Gakuen Ōtōsai Portable: Situation Voice CD ===
"Lucky Star: Ryōō Gakuen Ōtōsai Portable" DX Pack Yoyaku Tokuten: Situation Voice CD

Studio album by Aya Hirano, Emiri Katō, Kaori Fukuhara, and Aya Endō
- Released: December 23, 2010
- Genre: Drama
- Length: 5:15
- Label: Kadokawa Entertainment

"Lucky Star: Ryōō Gakuen Ōtōsai Portable" DX Pack Yoyaku Tokuten: Situation Voice CD (らき☆すた 〜陵桜学園 桜藤祭〜 Portable DXパック予約特典 シチュエーションボイスCD) is a drama CD based on the video game Lucky Star: Ryōō Gakuen Ōtōsai Portable which was first released on December 23, 2010 with the game package in Japan.

==== Track listing ====
1. "Prologue" (プロローグ)
2. "Sono 1 Moshi Lucky Star ga Battle Mono Dattara" (その1 もしらき☆すたがバトル物だったら)
3. "Sono 2 Minasan no Mizugi Sugata o Misete Kudasai" (その2 みなさんの水着姿を見せて下さい)
4. "Sono 3 Moshi Minasan ga Sukina Hito ni Propose Suru to Shitara" (その3 もし皆さんが好きな人にプロポーズするとしたら)

==== Cast ====
- Konata Izumi - Aya Hirano
- Kagami Hiiragi - Emiri Katō
- Tsukasa Hiiragi - Kaori Fukuhara
- Miyuki Takara - Aya Endō

=== Miyakawa Hinata no Ichinichi ===
Drama CD "Miyakawa-ke no Kūfuku" ~Miyakawa Hinata no Ichinichi~

Studio album by eight voice actresses
- Released: June 10, 2013
- Genre: Drama
- Label: Kadokawa Entertainment

Drama CD "Miyakawa-ke no Kūfuku" ~Miyakawa Hinata no Ichinichi~ (ドラマCD 宮河家の空腹〜宮河ひなたの一日〜) is a drama CD based on the web anime Miyakawa-ke no Kūfuku which was first released on June 10, 2013 with the "Comptiq" July 2013 issue in Japan.

==== Cast ====
- Hinata Miyakawa - Maina Shimagata
- Hikage Miyakawa - Koto Kawasaki
- Meito Anizawa - Tomokazu Seki
- Clerk Sugita - Tomokazu Sugita
- Clerk Ono - Daisuke Ono
- Salesman - Hiro Shimono
- Male customers - Fumihiko Tachiki
- Female customers - Kujira

== Radio CD ==
=== Lucky Channel Yattoke! Kōkai Rokuon ===
Lucky Channel Yattoke! Kōkai Rokuon (らっきー☆ちゃんねる やっとけ!公開録音) is a public recording of radio program Lucky Channel in Wonder Festival 2007 [Summer] on August 12, 2007.

==== Cast ====
- Akira Kogami - Hiromi Konno
- Minoru Shiraishi - Minoru Shiraishi
- Kagami Hiiragi - Emiri Katō
- Tsukasa Hiiragi - Kaori Fukuhara

==== Comptiq Hen CD ====
Lucky Channel Yattoke! Kōkai Rokuon: Comptiq Hen CD

Live album by Hiromi Konno, Minoru Shiraishi, Emiri Katō and Kaori Fukuhara
- Released: June 10, 2007
- Genre: Radio
- Length: 25:08
- Label: Kadokawa Entertainment

Lucky Channel Yattoke! Kōkai Rokuon: Comptiq Hen CD (らっきー☆ちゃんねる やっとけ!公開録音 コンプティーク編CD) is a public recording CD of radio program Lucky Channel which was first released on June 10, 2007 with the "Comptiq" July 2007 issue in Japan.

==== Comp Ace Hen CD ====
Lucky Channel Yattoke! Kōkai Rokuon: Comp Ace Hen CD

Live album by Hiromi Konno, Minoru Shiraishi, Emiri Katō and Kaori Fukuhara
- Released: October 26, 2007
- Genre: Radio
- Length: 21:07
- Label: Kadokawa Entertainment

Lucky Channel Yattoke! Kōkai Rokuon: Comp Ace Hen CD (らっきー☆ちゃんねる やっとけ!公開録音 コンプエース編CD) is a public recording CD of radio program Lucky Channel which was first released on October 26, 2007 with the "Comp Ace" December 2007 issue in Japan.

==== Comp Heroine's Hen CD ====
Lucky Channel Yattoke! Kōkai Rokuon: Comp Heroine's Hen CD

Live album by Hiromi Konno, Minoru Shiraishi, Emiri Katō and Kaori Fukuhara
- Released: November 26, 2007
- Genre: Radio
- Length: 25:35
- Label: Kadokawa Entertainment

Lucky Channel Yattoke! Kōkai Rokuon: Comp Heroine's Hen CD (らっきー☆ちゃんねる やっとけ!公開録音 コンプヒロインズ編CD) is a public recording CD of radio program Lucky Channel which was first released on November 26, 2007 with the "Comp H's" vol.7 in Japan.

=== Lucky Channel New Tokyo Circuit Special ===
TV Anime "Lucky Star" Radio CD: Lucky Channel New Tokyo Circuit Special

Live album by Hiromi Konno, Minoru Shiraishi, Kaoru Mizuhara, Mai Aizawa, Hirokazu Hiramatsu and Kagami Yoshimizu
- Released: May 25, 2011
- Genre: Radio
- Label: Lantis

TV Anime "Lucky Star" Radio CD: Lucky Channel New Tokyo Circuit Special (TVアニメ『らき☆すた』ラジオCD らっきー☆ちゃんねる 新東京サーキットスペシャル) is a Radio CD based on the radio program Lucky Channel which was first released on May 25, 2011 in Japan. At the variety show Lucky Racer R 2nd SP, joint simultaneous recording of "Lucky Channel" and "Lucky Racer" is performed, the talk part is recorded.

==== Track listing ====
1. "Akira to Minoru no Opening Talk" (あきらとみのるのオープニングトーク)
2. "Lucky Star Gensakusha, Yoshimizu Kagami Sensei Tōjō" (らき☆すた原作者、美水かがみ先生登場!)
3. "Haikei Combi Fukkatsu! Soshite Izumi Sōjirō Sansen!" (背景コンビ復活!そして泉そうじろう参戦!)
4. "Haikei Combi to Sōjirō no Kaiwa" (背景コンビとそうじろうの会話)
5. "Gudaguda na 5 nin" (グダグダな5人)
6. "Minna de Ending Talk" (みんなでエンディングトーク)

==== Cast ====
- Akira Kogami - Hiromi Konno
- Minoru Shiraishi - Minoru Shiraishi
- Misao Kusakabe - Kaoru Mizuhara
- Ayano Minegishi - Mai Aizawa
- Sōjirō Izumi - Hirokazu Hiramatsu
- Kagami Yoshimizu
