= 39th Army =

39th Army may refer to:

- 39th Army (People's Republic of China)
- 39th Army (Soviet Union)
- Thirty-Ninth Army (Japan)

== See also ==
- List of armies by number
- 39th Division (disambiguation)
- 39th Brigade (disambiguation)
- 39th Regiment (disambiguation)
- 39th Squadron (disambiguation)
- 39th (disambiguation)
