= Division 39 =

Division 39 may refer to:

- 39th Division (disambiguation), several military units
- Room 39, an alleged slush fund operated by the North Korean government
- Division 39, a "state-sponsored mafia" in the video game Mercenaries: Playground of Destruction
