= 39 =

39 may refer to:

- 39 (number), the natural number following 38 and preceding 40
- one of the years:
  - 39 BC
  - AD 39
  - 1939
  - 2039
- 39 (album), a 2000 studio album by Mikuni Shimokawa
- 39 (read as “mi-ku”), often used to refer to Hatsune Miku
- "'39", a 1975 song by Queen
- "Thirty Nine", a song by Karma to Burn from the album Almost Heathen, 2001
- Thirty-Nine, a 2022 South Korean television series
- 39 Laetitia, a main-belt asteroid
- The international calling code for Italy and Vatican City

== See also ==
- 39th (disambiguation)
