= List of Full Metal Panic! media =

This is a listing of the Full Metal Panic! light novel books, as well as the anime productions and manga based upon it.

== Soundtracks ==
=== Full Metal Panic! ===
==== Opening and ending theme ====
Performed by Mikuni Shimokawa, collected on the single album, tomorrow / 枯れない花 published by Pony Canyon.

ASIN:B00005V1M7

	Japanese title	Transliteration
Opening	tomorrow	Tomorrow
Closing	枯れない花	Karenai Hana

==== Full Metal Panic OST 1 ====
Full Metal Panic! Original Sound Track Album

Soundtrack album by Toshihiko Sahashi
- Released: 17 April 2002
- Genre: Anime soundtrack
- Length: 42:08
- Label: Pony Canyon

Composed by Toshihiko Sahashi. JAN:4988013324008.

#	English Title	Japanese Title		Time
#	English Title	Kanji	Romaji	Time
1.	"Tomorrow"	tomorrow（オープニング・テーマ）		3:38
2.	"Before the Storm"	嵐の前	Arashi no Mae	2:25
3.	"Subtitle"	サブタイトル		0:09
4.	"Whisperings"	ささやき	Sasayaki	1:05
5.	"Check List"	チェック・リスト		1:43
6.	"Fighting M9"	戦うM9	Tatakau M9	1:25
7.	"Conspiracy"	コンスピラシー		2:12
8.	"Nine Dragons"	九つの龍	Kokonotsu no Ryu	2:01
9.	"No Mercy"	ノー・マーシー		1:56
10.	"Black Operation"	ブラック・オペレーション		2:20
11.	"Eye Catch"	アイキャッチ		0:07
12.	"Plan 1056"	プラン1056		2:19
13.	"Trio at the Dinner Table"	トリオの食卓	Torio no Shokutaku	1:25
14.	"Our School"	我らがまなびや	Warera ga Manabiya	1:18
15.	"Scolding and Excuses"	叱責と弁解	Shisseki to Benkai	1:07
16.	"Cool Running"	クール・ランニング		2:07
17.	"Kaname's Kitchen"	かなめのキッチン	Kaname no Kitchen	1:55
18.	"Kaname's Pajamas"	かなめのパジャマ	Kaname no Pajama	2:08
19.	"A Peaceful Night"	かくも平和な夜	Kaku mo Heiwa na Yoru	1:44
20.	"A Compounding Problem"	こじれる問題	Kojireru Mondai	0:52
21.	"Walking the Kitten"	仔猫の散歩	Koneko no Sanpo	1:18
22.	"Goro Kadokawa and the Suppin Girls"	角川五郎とすっぴんガールズです	Kadokawa Gorō to Suppin Girls Desu	1:06
23.	"Gung-ho Guy?"	特攻野郎？	Tokkō Yarō?	1:16
24.	"Neverwilting Flower"	枯れない花（エンディング・テーマ）	Karenai Hana	4:31

==== Full Metal Panic OST 2 ====
Full Metal Panic Original Sound Track Album 2

Soundtrack album by Toshihiko Sahashi
- Released: 19 June 2002
- Genre: Anime soundtrack
- Length: 48:36
- Label: Pony Canyon

Composed by Toshihiko Sahashi. JAN:4988013358409.

#	English Title	Japanese Title		Time
#	English Title	Kanji	Romaji	Time
1.	"The Man Who Came In from the Cold"	寒い国からきた男	Samui Kuni kara Kita Otoko	2:27
2.	"Scoundrels"	ならず者部隊	Narazumono Butai	1:28
3.	"Under the Surface"	水面下の状景	Suimenka no Jōkei	1:04
4.	"A Picture"	写真	Shashin	1:05
5.	"The Overture of a Reckless Run"	直立不動は暴走の序曲	Chokuritsu Fudō wa Bousō Jokyoku	0:59
6.	"Attending School"	通学任務	Tsūgaku Ninmu	1:23
7.	"Safehouse"	夕日のセーフハウス	Yūhi no Safehouse	1:20
8.	"Let's Go Home Together..."	一緒に帰ろうよ...	Issho ni Kaerōyo...	2:28
9.	"The Captain Is 16 Years Old!"	艦長は16歳	Kanchō wa 16 Sai	1:27
10.	"Tuatha de Danaan"	トゥアハー・デ・ダナン		2:00
11.	"Executive Orders"	任務遂行指令	Ninmu Suikō Shirei	1:46
12	"Lady Chapel"	レディ・チャペル		1:28
13.	"Passing Each Other"	すれ違う心	Surechigau Kokoro	1:32
14.	"Sad Little Bird"	悲しい小鳥	Kanashii Kotori	2:03
15.	Warmth	ぬくもり	Nukumori	2:06
16.	The Empire of Darkness	暗やみの帝国	Kurayami no Teikoku	1:54
17.	"Monster Film"	怪獣映画	Kaijū Eiga	1:32
18.	"Creeping"	クリーピング		1:33
19.	"The Savage Beast Presses"	猛獣がせまる	Mōjū ga Semaru	1:31
20.	"Run Silent, Run Deep...."	深く，静かに・・・・	Fukaku, Shizuka ni....	2:01
21.	"Pursuit"	迫撃	Hakugeki	1:45
22.	"Counterattack"	反撃開始	Hangeki Kaishi	1:41
23.	"Fire at Will"	FIRE AT WILL		1:35
24.	"Direct Action"	ダイレクト・アクション		1:09
25.	"Hit & Run"	高速離脱	Kōsoku Ridatsu	2:14
26.	"Hate Is Exceeded"	憎しみを越えて	Nikushimi wo Koete	1:45
27.	"The End of the Fight"	戦い終えて	Tatakai Oete	1:40
28.	"Epilogue"	エピローグ		1:32
29.	"Take Me Out Mariana Trench"	Take me out Mariana trench		1:49
30.	"Eye Catch"	アイキャッチ		0:20

=== Full Metal Panic? Fumoffu ===
==== Opening and ending theme ====
Performed by Mikuni Shimokawa, collected on the single album, それが、愛でしょう/君に吹く風 published by Pony Canyon.

ASIN: B0000A8UZQ

	Japanese Title	Transliteration
Opening	それが、愛でしょう	Sore ga, Ai deshō
Closing	君に吹く風	Kimi ni Fuku Kaze

==== Full Metal Panic? Fumoffu OST ====
Full Metal Panic? Fumoffu Original Sound Track Album

Soundtrack album by Toshihiko Sahashi
- Released: 17 December 2003
- Genre: Anime soundtrack
- Length: 63:10
- Label: Pony Canyon

Composed by Toshihiko Sahashi. フルメタル・パニック?ふもっふサウンドトラックアルバム by Pony Canyon Records. ASIN: B0000DJWDG

#	English Title	Japanese Title		Time
#	English Title	Kanji	Romaji	Time
1.	"Isn't That Love?"	それが、愛でしょう	Sore ga, Ai deshō	5:14
2.	"Going to School, and Following"	登校と尾行と	Tōkō to Bikō to	2:17
3.	"Explosions Like the Breeze"	爆風はそよ風のように	Bakufū wa Soyokaze no Yō ni	1:51
4.	"Leaving Memories Behind"	想い出を残して	Omoide wo Nokoshite	2:45
5.	"Conspiracy of the Student Council"	生徒会の陰謀	Seitokai no Inbō	2:09
6.	"Intrusion into the Campus"	校内潜入	Kōnai Sennyu	1:42
7.	"Club Shutdown at Stake"	廃部を賭けて	Haibu wo Kakete	1:53
8.	"Fear Within the School"	校内の恐怖	Kōnai no Kyōfu	1:58
9.	"Preparations for Battle"	戦闘準備	Sentō Junbi	1:36
10.	"Enemies That Lurk in Town"	街角に潜む敵	Machikado ni Hisomu Teki	1:35
11.	"Combat Operations"	作戦行動	Sakusen Kōdō	1:41
12.	"Class Outside"	校外学習	Kagai Jugyo	1:28
13.	"Honor and Properness"	仁義の花道	Jingi no Hanamichi	1:32
14.	"Fumo Fumo Parade"	ふもふもパレード		0:57
15.	"Mascot Suits Attack"	きぐるみ出撃	Kigurumi Shutsugeki	2:08
16.	"Subtitle"	サブタイトル		0:12
17.	"Eye Catch"	アイキャッチ		0:13
18.	"Trap"	トラップ		1:49
19.	"Training, Training"	特訓、特訓	Tokkun, Tokkun	1:46
20.	"New Weapon System"	新型兵器	Shingata Heiki	1:44
21.	"Town Painted Red in the Sunset"	黄昏に赤く染まる町内	Tasogare ni Akaku Somaru Chōnai	2:13
22.	"Charge!"	とつにゅー	Totsunyū	1:04
23	"Paradise GOGO"	PARADISE GOGO		1:24
24.	"Grueling Club Activities"	過酷な部活	Kakoku na Bukatsu	1:41
25.	"The Tragic Class Leader"	悲劇のクラス委員	Higeki no Kurasu-iin	1:39
26.	"The Fight Is Endless"	果し合いは果てしなく	Hateshiai wa Hateshinaku	3:11
27.	"Deadheat"	でっどひーと		1:37
28.	"Ghost Stories of the School???"	学校のかいだん？？？	Gakkō no Kaidan???	1:50
29.	"The Battlefield Is the Classroom"	戦場は学び舎	Senjō wa Manabiya	1:29
30.	"Just the Two of Us..."	ふたりで・・・	Futari de...	1:32
31.	"Awkward Thoughts"	不器用な想い	Bikiyō na Omoi	2:08
32.	"Even So, with Him"	それでも、あいつと	Soredemo, Aitsu to	1:56
33.	"The Wind That Blows to You"	君に吹く風	Kimi ni Fuku Kaze	4:40

=== Full Metal Panic! The Second Raid ===
==== Opening and ending theme ====
Performed by Mikuni Shimokawa, collected on the single album, 南風 / もう一度君に会いたい published by Pony Canyon.

ASIN:B000A0H4RC

	Japanese Title	Transliteration
Opening	南風	Minami Kaze
Closing	もう一度君に会いたい	Mō Ichido Kimi ni Aitai

==== Full Metal Panic TSR OST ====
Full Metal Panic! The Second Raid Original Sound Track Album

Soundtrack album by Toshihiko Sahashi
- Released: 18 August 2005
- Genre: Anime soundtrack
- Length: 44:39
- Label: Pony Canyon
- Producer: Takashi Watanabe

#	English Title	Japanese Title		Time
#	English Title	Kanji	Romaji	Time
1.	"Southerly Wind"	南風 shibuya edit	Minami Kaze shibuya edit	2:39
2.	"Shadowy Dealings"	暗躍	Anyaku	1:53
3.	"Sprint"	疾走	Shissō	2:30
4.	"Course Change"	回顧	Kaiko	2:37
5.	"Peace"	平穏	Heion	1:59
6.	"Friendship and Love"	友愛	Yūai	1:49
7.	"Troubled Mind"	苦悩	Kunō	1:38
8.	"Worries"	懸念	Kennen	2:10
9.	"Tension"	切迫	Seppaku	2:32
10.	"Fate"	宿命	Shukumei	1:38
11.	"Invasion"	侵攻	Shinkō	2:12
12.	"Conflict"	対峙	Taiji	2:15
13.	"Command"	指令	Shirei	2:40
14.	"Strike"	出撃	Shutsugeki	2:22
15.	"CQC"	格闘	Kakutō	2:13
16.	"Run"	疾駆	Shikku	2:35
17.	"Counter Strike"	反撃	Hangeki	2:44
18.	"Victory"	勝利	Shōri	4:10
19.	"I Want to See You Again"	もう一度君に会いたい ebisu edit	Mō Ichido Kimi ni Aitai ebisu edit	2:04

== Non-Japanese releases ==
- Europe: ADV Films UK released the series on DVD in Europe in at least two versions, one of them being Scandinavian.
  Klub Publishing released the first two series on DVD in Hungary.

== Toys ==
=== Human figures ===
The series has many figures of the various characters. Atelier Sai has produced a blind-box set based on Fumoffu's female characters-a set with guns, and a set from the hot spring. 1/6 and 1/8 scale figures of Tessa and Kaname are available, some of which have removable clothing.

=== Arm Slaves ===
The series has various action figures of the Arm Slaves. Alter and Aoshima produced 1/48 and 1/35 scale figures of Kurz and Mao's Gernsbacks, the Arbalest and an RK-92 Savage. Kaiyodo introduced the Arbalest and Laevatein into their Revoltech line in 2007 and 2008. In August 2011, Revoltech re-released the Laevatein in a much bigger package which includes the XL-3 flight pack as well. Bandai took it a step further in 2009 by including the Arm Slaves as part of the company's Robot Damashii (Robot Spirits) line-up, starting with the Arbalest in September 2009. Since then, the firm produced replicas of Kurz and Mao's Gernsbacks, the Falke, desert and urban versions of the Savage AS, the standard and Combat variations of Sousuke's Bonta-kun, the ARX-8 Laevatein, the Codarl, a recolored Arbalest with Lambda Driver flame-effect parts, and Leonard Testarossa's Belial. The XL-2 Emergency jetpack, the mass-produced Combat Bonta-kun (a gray-skinned soldier version that appeared in the Fumoffu episode Fancy without Honor or Humanity), a blue-and-white Savage that appeared in the novel Burning One-Man Force, the XL-3 flight pack, Gates and Gauron's Venom, the mass-produced Codarl, their weapon set, and a flight pack designed for the Arbalest Lambda Driver are limited-edition online exclusives, with a sniper version of the Zy-99m Shadow slated for March 2014. Hobby Japan offered the Hiroshi Squadron Gernsback (desert versions featured in the first season's Wind Blows at Home storyarc) as a mail-order exclusive in its issues from March to April 2010. Dengeki Hobby followed suit with a weapon set and a recolored Arbalest that appeared in the first-season episode Venom's Fire (which also had the weapons set bundled in).

For Full Metal Panic! Another, Robot Spirits figures have been produced of the AS-1 Blaze Raven, Fumiko Sanjo's Rk-02 Sceptre, and a DOMS special Zy-99m Shadow (online exclusive). A red version of the Blaze Raven is bundled with the fifth novel volume and a heavy weapons version of the Rk-02 belonging to Sanjo's brother Akira were released in 2013.
