= Minoru Shiraishi =

Japanese voice actor

- 白石 稔
- Born: October 18, 1978 (age 47); Ehime Prefecture, Japan
- Education: Waseda University
- Occupations: Actor; voice actor; singer; songwriter; radio personality
- Years active: 2002–present
- Agent: GadgetLink
- Notable work: Lucky Star as himself, Nichijou as Sakamoto

Minoru Shiraishi (白石 稔, Shiraishi Minoru; born October 18, 1978 in Ehime Prefecture) is a Japanese actor, voice actor, singer, songwriter, and radio personality who was formerly affiliated with I'm Enterprise and Pro-Fit. He is the only "live-action" character (as he played "himself" in Lucky☆Star) in the Newtype Anime magazine to be featured in the Monthly Top-10 Most-Popular Male Character charts. He played himself in Episode 6 of Kiddy Girl-and as a voice actor in a voice actor cafe. Other roles include Taniguchi in the Haruhi Suzumiya series, and Itsuki Takeuchi in the Initial D reboot feature films in 2014.

Minoru married on August 9, 2011, but has chosen to keep his wife's identity anonymous.

On December 29, 2015, Minoru revealed that he has facial paralysis, making him unable to move the right side of his face. He is currently taking medication and undergoing treatment.

== Filmography ==
=== Anime ===
- D.N.Angel (2003), Takeshi Saehara
- Fafner of the Azure (2004), Kenji Kondou
- Bobobo-bo Bo-bobo (2005), Super Rabbit, Chikuwan
- Mahou Sensei Negima (2005), Seruhiko-sensei
- The Melancholy of Haruhi Suzumiya (2006), Taniguchi
- The Skull Man (2007), Police Officer
- Lucky ☆ Star (2007), Himself
- Ga-rei -Zero- (2008), Kazuki Sakuraba, Kensuke Nimura
- The Melancholy of Haruhi-chan Suzumiya/Nyorōn Churuya-san (2009), (Taniguchi/Kimidori-san)
- Kiddy Girl-and (2009), Minu-san, cafeteria owner
- Saki (2009), Ichita Uchiki
- Seitokai Yakuindomo (2010), Kenji
- Steins;Gate (2011), 4 °C (Shid)
- Nichijou (2011), Sakamoto
- Maken-ki! (2011), Tanaka
- Future Diary (2011), Ōji Kōsaka
- Photo Kano (2013), Itta Nakagawa
- My Teen Romantic Comedy SNAFU (2013), Ōoka
- My Neighbor Seki (2014), Akiyoshi Uzawa
- Buddy Complex (2014), Saburota Ogisaka
- New Initial D: Legend 1 - Awakening (2014), Itsuki Takeuchi
- Doraemon (2015), Sugoroko Dice (Ep.436)
- My First Girlfriend Is a Gal (2017), Minoru Kobayakawa
- Cutie Honey Universe (2018), Alphonne
- The Price of Smiles (2019), Blake Boyer
- Ultraman (2019), Shiraishi
- Arifureta: From Commonplace to World's Strongest (2019), Daisuke Hiyama
- Magatsu Wahrheit -Zuerst- (2020), Jade
- Skeleton Knight in Another World (2022), Cetrion
- The Fruit of Evolution 2 (2023), Agnos Passion
- Zenryoku Usagi (2023), Shift Head
- Orb: On the Movements of the Earth (2024), Gras
- Summer Pockets (2025), Kobato Naruse
- Liar Game (2026), Yuichi Nishida

=== Video games ===
- Moe Cure Net (2005), Male characters
- Super Robot Wars UX (2013), Kenji Kondou
- Granblue Fantasy (2015), Lowain
- MeiQ: Labyrinth of Death (2015), Ganz
- Crash Team Racing Nitro-Fueled (2019), Pinstripe Potoroo
