= 39th Avenue =

39th Avenue may refer to:

- 39 Avenue station (Calgary), a CTrain station in Calgary, Alberta
- 39th Avenue station (BMT Astoria Line), a New York City Subway station in New York, New York

== See also ==
- 39th Street (disambiguation)
