= 39th Street =

39th Street may refer to:

- 39th Street (Chicago), Illinois
- 39th Street (Kansas City), Missouri
- 39th Street (Manhattan), New York City
- 39th Street (Sacramento RT), Sacramento, California

== See also ==
- 39th Avenue (disambiguation)
