= 39th Battalion =

39th Battalion may refer to:

- 39th Battalion (Australia), a unit of the Australian Army
- 39th (Personnel Support) Battalion, a unit of the Australian Army
- 39th Signal Battalion (United States), a unit of the United States Army located in Belgium

== See also ==
- 39th Division (disambiguation)
- 39th Brigade (disambiguation)
- 39th Regiment (disambiguation)
- 39th Squadron (disambiguation)
