= Mikuni Shimokawa =

Japanese pop singer and songwriter (born 1980)

Mikuni Shimokawa 下川 みくに
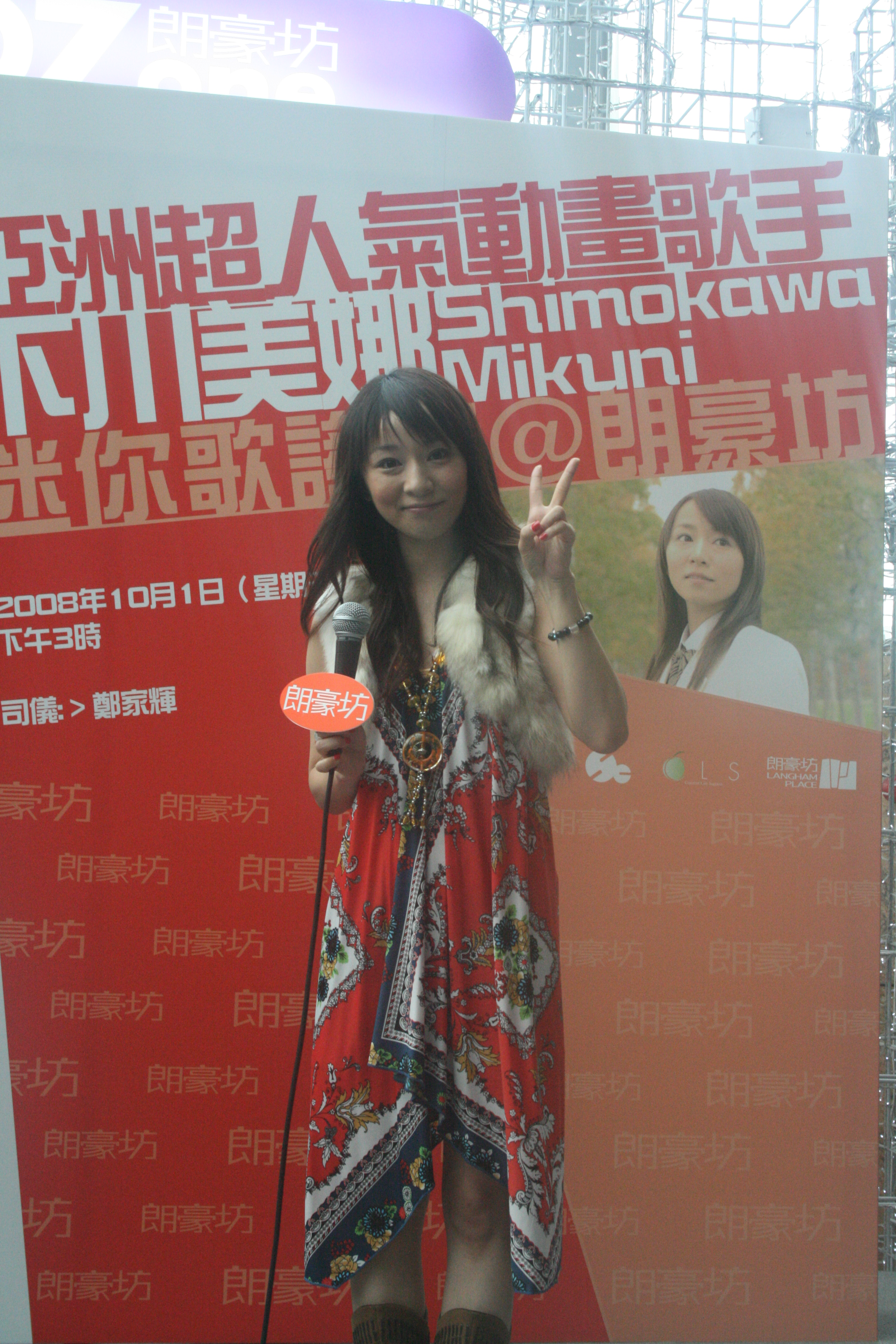
- Mikuni Shimokawa

Background information
- Born: 19 March 1980 (age 46); Shinhidaka, Hokkaido, Japan
- Genres: J-pop; pop rock
- Occupations: Singer; songwriter
- Years active: 1999–present
- Label: Pony Canyon
- Website: https://ameblo.jp/shimokawa-mikuni/

Mikuni Shimokawa (下川 みくに, Shimokawa Mikuni; born 19 March 1980) is a Japanese pop singer and songwriter. She is best known for her songs used for anime theme music, particularly the opening and ending themes of the Full Metal Panic! series. In addition to her vocal talents, Shimokawa can also play the piano. She is a former member of the girl group Checkicco.

== Personal life ==
Mikuni is currently married to voice actor Tsuyoshi Koyama. The two were wed on Valentine's Day 2012.

== Discography ==
=== Studio albums ===
#	Title	Number of tracks	Release date
1st	39	12	19 March 2000
2nd	392 ~mikuni shimokawa BEST SELECTION~	12	19 September 2002
3rd	KIMI NO UTA "Your song"	13	24 November 2004
4th	Sayonara mo Ienakatta Natsu	11	4 July 2007
5th/3rd Best Album	Heavenly - 10th Anniversary Album	14	18 March 2009
6th	Kokoro Oto.	7	4 July 2018

=== Compilation albums ===
#	Title	Number of tracks	Release date
1st cover album	Review: Mikuni Shimokawa Seishun Anison Cover Album	11	17 December 2003
Best album	Mikuni Shimokawa Singles & Movies	25 (18 + 7 Videos)	18 May 2005
2nd cover album	Remember	14	15 March 2006
2nd Best Album	Reprise: Shimokawa Mikuni Best	2 x 11	19 December 2007
1st Self Cover Album	9 -Que!!	13	19 March 2008
4th Best Album	Tsubasa: Very Best of Mikuni Shimokawa	18	5 August 2009
3rd cover album	Replay! Shimokawa Mikuni Seishun Anison Cover III	12	21 July 2010
5th Best Album	Platinum Best Shimokawa Mikuni: Seishun Anison Cover Album	9+12	19 July 2017

=== Singles ===
#	Information
1st	Believer: Tabidachi No Uta: Released: 28 April 1999; 1. Believer: Tabidachi No Uta (Believer～旅立ちの歌～); 2. Adrenaline (アドレナリン)
2nd	If: Moshi Mo Negai Ga Kanau Nara: Released: 28 July 1999; 1. If: Moshi Mo Negai Ga Kanau Nara (If～もしも願いが叶うなら～); 2. Shiawase No Passport (幸せのパスポート) (translation: Passport to Happiness)
3rd	2000Express: Released: 20 October 1999; 1. 2000Express; 2. Tabun Alright (たぶんオーライ)
4th	Surrender: Released: 17 February 2000; 1. Surrender; 2. Tokimeki Rush De Ikimashou (トキメキ・ラッシュで行きましょう)
5th	Naked: Released: 7 June 2000; 1. Naked; 2. Long Good Bye
6th	Alone: Released: 6 December 2000; 1. Alone; Anime television series Gensomaden Saiyuki 2nd ending theme 2. Kimi No Inai Machi (君のいない街)
7th	Tomorrow/Karenai Hana: Released: 20 February 2002; 1. Tomorrow; Anime television series Full Metal Panic! opening theme 2. Karenai Hana (枯れない花) (translation: Undying Flower); Anime television series Full Metal Panic! ending theme 3. Kimi No Yume (キミノユメ) (translation: Your Dream)
8th	True/Tatta Hitotsu No: Released: 21 August 2002; 1. True; Anime television series Dragon Drive opening theme 2. Tatta Hitotsu No (たった、ひとつの) (translation: The One and Only); Anime television series Dragon Drive ending theme 3. Kimi to Futari (キミと二人) (translation: The Two of Us)
9th	All the Way: Released: 18 June 2003; 1. all the way; Anime television series Kino's Journey opening theme 2. Again; 3. Popcorn (single version); Anime television series Hunter × Hunter ending theme
10th	Sore Ga Ai Deshou/Kimi Ni Fuku Kaze: Released: 3 September 2003; 1. Sore Ga Ai Deshō (それが、愛でしょう, I Guess That's Love); Anime television series Full Metal Panic? Fumoffu opening theme 2. Kimi Ni Fuku Kaze (君に吹く風, The Wind Blows to You); Anime television series Full Metal Panic? Fumoffu ending theme 3. Are Kara (あれから)
11th	Kanashimi Ni Makenaide/Kohaku: Released: 27 October 2004; 1. Kanashimi Ni Makenaide (悲しみに負けないで); Anime television series Grenadier - The Senshi of Smiles ending theme 2. Kohaku; Anime television series Grenadier – The Senshi of Smiles opening theme 3. True Love (Toorigakari Hikigatari Version, 通りがかり弾き語りバージョン)
12th	Minami Kaze/Mou Ichido Kimi ni Aitai: Released: 18 August 2005; 1. Minamikaze (南風, Southern Wind); Anime television series Full Metal Panic!: The Second Raid opening theme 2. Mou Ichido Kimi Ni Aitai (もう一度君に会いたい, I Want to See You Again); Anime television series Full Metal Panic!: The Second Raid ending theme 3. Ano Hi Ni Kaeritai (あの日に帰りたい, I Want to Go Back to the Olden Days)
13th	Bird: Released: 14 March 2007; 1. Bird; Kino's Journey 2nd movie theme song 2. Tegami (手紙); 3. Kimi No Negai (キミの願い); 4. Bird: Instrumental
14th	Ijanai!?: Released: 3 December 2008; 1. Ijanai!? (イ～じゃナイ!?); Blue Dragon 1st ending theme song 2. Chain; 3. Happy Birthday; 4. Ijanai!? (Instrumental)
15th	Tsubomi: Released: 18 February 2009; 1. Tsubomi (蕾~tsubomi~); Blue Dragon 2nd ending theme song 2. Yume Miru Kimi e (ユメミルキミヘ); 3. Tomorrow: Shanghai Live Recording (Tomorrow-上海ライブ録音-); 4. Mou Ichido Kimi Ni Aitai: Shanghai Live Recording (もう一度君に会いたい-上海ライブ録音-)
16th	Kimi Ga Iru Kara: Released: 21 July 2010; 1. Kimi Ga Iru Kara (君がいるから); Fairy Tail 4th ending theme song 2. Aitakute (会いたくて); 3. Kimi Ga Iru Kara -Instrumental- (君がいるから-Instrumental-)
