= 39 Squadron =

39 Squadron or 39th Squadron may refer to:

- No. 39 Squadron RAF, a unit of the United Kingdom Royal Air Force
- 39th Airlift Squadron (United States), a unit of the United States Air Force
- 39th Information Operations Squadron (United States), a unit of the United States Air Force
- Marine Aviation Logistics Squadron 39, a unit of the United States Marine Corps

== See also ==
- 39th Division (disambiguation)
- 39th Brigade (disambiguation)
- 39th Regiment (disambiguation)
- 39th Battalion (disambiguation)
