= 39th Regiment =

39th Regiment may refer to:

== Infantry regiments ==
- 2/39 Evzone Regiment, Greece
- The Garhwal Rifles (39th Garhwal Rifles), a unit of both the British Indian Army, and the present Indian Army
- 39th (Dorsetshire) Regiment of Foot, a unit of the British Army
- 39th Infantry Regiment (France), a unit of the French Army
- 39th Infantry Regiment (United States), a unit of the United States Army
- 39th Infantry Regiment (War of 1812), a unit of the United States Army

== Cavalry regiments ==
- Central India Horse (21st King George V's Own Horse) (39th Regiment Central India Horse), a unit of the British Indian Army

== Engineering regiments ==
- 39 Engineer Regiment (United Kingdom), a unit of the British Army's Royal Engineers

== Artillery regiments ==
- 39th Regiment Royal Artillery, a unit of the United Kingdom Army

== American Civil War units ==
- 39th Illinois Volunteer Infantry Regiment, a unit of the Union (Northern) Army
- 39th Iowa Volunteer Infantry Regiment, a unit of the Union (Northern) Army
- 39th New Jersey Volunteer Infantry, a unit of the Union (Northern) Army
- 39th New York Volunteer Infantry Regiment, a unit of the Union (Northern) Army
- 39th Wisconsin Volunteer Infantry Regiment, a unit of the Union (Northern) Army
- 39th United States Infantry, a unit of the Union (Northern) Army

== See also ==
- 39th Division (disambiguation)
- 39th Brigade (disambiguation)
- 39th Battalion (disambiguation)
- 39th Squadron (disambiguation)
