= 39th Division =

39th Division or 39th Infantry Division may refer to:

== Infantry divisions ==
- 39th Division (German Empire), Imperial German Army
- 39th Bavarian Reserve Division, Bavarian and Imperial German Armies
- 39th Infantry Division (Wehrmacht), German Army during World War II
- 39th Infantry Division (India), British Army of India
- 39th Division (Imperial Japanese Army)
- 39th Infantry Division (Poland), Polish Army
- 39th Infantry Division (Russian Empire)
- 39th Guards Mechanized Division, Soviet Union
- 39th Guards Motor Rifle Division, Soviet Army, earlier the 39th Guards Rifle Division
- 39th Mechanized Division (Soviet Union)
- 39th Rifle Division, Soviet Army
- 39th Mechanized Infantry Division, Turkey
- 39th Division (United Kingdom)
- 39th Infantry Division (United States), United States Army
- 39th Division (Yugoslav Partisans)

== Armoured divisions ==
- 39th Guards Tank Division, Soviet Union
- 39th Tank Division (Soviet Union), Soviet Army, part of the 18th Army (Soviet Union)
- 39th Armored Division (United States), phantom unit during WWII

== Artillery divisions ==
- 39th Guards Rocket Division, Soviet Union

== Aviation divisions ==
- 39th Air Division, United States Air Force
- 39th Aviation Division, Yugoslav Air Force

== Politics and government ==
- Room 39, also called "Division 39", a slush fund allegedly operated by the North Korean government

== See also ==
- Division 39 (disambiguation)
- List of military divisions by number
- 39th Army (disambiguation)
- 39th Brigade (disambiguation)
- 39th Regiment (disambiguation)
- 39th Battalion (disambiguation)
- 39th Squadron (disambiguation)
