= 39th Brigade =

39th Brigade or 39th Infantry Brigade may refer to:

== British India ==
- 39th Indian Infantry Brigade

== Canada ==
- 39 Canadian Brigade Group, a formation of the Canadian Army

== Iraq ==
- 39th Harakat al-Abdal Brigade

== Russia ==
- 39th Separate Guards Motor Rifle Brigade

== Spain ==
- 39th Mixed Brigade, a unit of the Spanish Republican Army

== Ukraine ==
- 39th Marine Brigade (Ukraine)
- 39th Separate Air Assault Brigade
- 39th Tactical Aviation Brigade (Ukraine)

== United Kingdom ==
- 39th Anti-Aircraft Brigade (United Kingdom)
- 39th Infantry Brigade (United Kingdom)
- 39th Brigade Royal Field Artillery
- 39th Divisional Trench Mortar Brigade

== United States ==
- 39th Infantry Brigade Combat Team, a unit of the United States Army

== See also ==
- 39th Division (disambiguation)
- 39th Regiment (disambiguation)
- 39th Battalion (disambiguation)
- 39th Squadron (disambiguation)
