= Nadeshiko =

Nadeshiko may refer to:

- Dianthus superbus subsp. longicalycinus, a flowering plant native to Japan
  - A feminine given name in Japan, after the flower
- Yamato nadeshiko, a Japanese term used to praise the idealized Japanese woman
- Nadeshiko Japan, the Japan women's national football team

== Fictional characters ==
- Nadeshiko Kinomoto, late mother of the title character in the manga and anime series Cardcaptor Sakura
- Nadeshiko Fujisaki, a character in the manga and anime series Shugo Chara!
- Nadeshiko, a character in the Japanese light novel and anime Inukami!
- Nadeshiko Kagamihara (各務原 なでしこ), a character in the manga series Laid-Back Camp
- Nadeshiko Yamato from the manga Kimi no koto ga Dai Dai Dai Dai Daisuki na 100-nin no Kanojo
- Yamato Nadeshiko (大和ナデシコ) the wrestling partner of Rainbow Mika

== See also ==
- Yamato Nadeshiko (song), a 2006 single by Riyu Kosaka
- Martian Successor Nadesico, a 1996 anime
- The Wallflower (manga) (Japanese title: Yamato Nadeshiko Shichi Henge), a manga series
