= Aya Endō =

Japanese voice actress and narrator

- 遠藤 綾
- Born: February 17, 1980 (age 46); Yamagata Prefecture, Japan
- Status: Active
- Occupations: Voice actress; narrator
- Years active: 2001–present
- Agent: Intention
- Notable work: Boruto: Naruto Next Generations as Sumire Kakei; Jujutsu Kaisen as Shoko Ieiri; Genshin Impact as Yelan; Hunter x Hunter as Komugi; Lucky Star as Miyuki Takara; Macross Frontier as Sheryl Nome; So, I Can't Play H! as Lisara Restal; Yo-kai Watch as Fumika Kodama; Accel World as Fuuko Kurasaki; Sekirei as Matsu; Mr. Osomatsu as Totoko; Path to Nowhere as Dreya; Zenless Zone Zero as Astra Yao; Honkai: Star Rail as Aglaea; Reverse: 1999 as Urd
- Height: 160 cm (5 ft 3 in)

Aya Endō (遠藤 綾, Endō Aya; born February 17, 1980) is a Japanese voice actress and narrator from Yamagata Prefecture who is affiliated with Intention. After Yūko Mizutani's death, she took over many of her roles. Her hobby is swimming.

== Career ==
After graduating from high school, Endō moved to Tokyo to become a voice actress. She enrolled in the Performing Arts Center, the training school led by Nachi Nozawa, and graduated after repeating a year. She said that the reason she decided to go to the training school was because her parents knew Nozawa and thought he would be a safe option. When she was in the training school, she was not good at theater, and according to Nozawa, she once said that she hated theater. She wanted to do plays, but did not want to act in love scenes, and she was not allowed to graduate as a result, so Nozawa decided to make plays without love scenes. In addition, since she originally wanted to be a voice actor, the principal's words about being an actor before being a voice actor weighed heavily on those around him, and when the class and the school were asked who wanted to be a voice actor, Endō was the only one who raised her hand.

Her first regular TV anime role was as Kasumi Horiguchi in Oku-sama wa Joshi Kōsei in 2005, and since gaining recognition as Miyuki Takara in Lucky Star in 2007, she has played Sheryl Nome in Macross Frontier and Angelique in Neo Angelique in 2008. In the internet radio program Plume Monogatari, she formed the voice acting unit "Plume" with Manabi Mizuno and Shiho Kawaragi, but it is currently inactive.

Endō won the theme song award (Radio Kansai Award) at the 12th Animation Kobe for Motteke! Sailor Fuku, the opening theme song for the TV animation Lucky Star, and in 2008, she won the Best Singing award at the 2nd Seiyu Awards together with Aya Hirano, Emiri Katō and Kaori Fukuhara. In 2009, she won the Best Supporting Actress award at the 3rd Seiyu Awards.

On August 8, 2013, Endō reported her marriage on her blog.

Following the closure of Office PAC on March 31, 2025, Endō become affiliated with Intention, a voice acting agency founded by voice actor Kenichi Suzumura.

== Filmography ==
=== Anime ===
List of voice performances in anime
Year	Title	Role	Notes	Source
2003	The Galaxy Railways	Morgana		
2004	Saiyuki Reload Gunlock	Rin		
2004	Hamtaro	Asa-chan		
2004	Monster	Inge, Coretta		
2004	Love Love?	Schoolgirl		
2004–05	Girls Bravo	Various characters		
2004	Gakuen Alice	Child		
2005	Emma - A Victorian Romance	Mary	Also Second Act 2007	
2005	Oku-sama wa Joshi Kōsei	Kasumi Horiguchi		
2006	Fushigiboshi no Futago Hime Gyu!	Trowa		
2006	Kiba	Guraujio, Sagiri		
2006	Inukami!	Imari		
2006	Zegapain	Misaki Sogoru		
2006	Tokko	Yukino Shiraishi		
2006	Onegai My Melody: KuruKuru Shuffle!	Ayane Ueno		
2006	La Corda d'Oro	Ayano Takashina 高階礼乃	season 1	
2006	Mamotte! Lollipop	Sun Sherard		
2006	Kujibiki Unbalance	R3S		
2007	Claymore	Claymore		
2007	Engage Planet Kiss Dum	Noa Rukina, others		
2007	Shinkyoku Sokai Polyphonica	Christa phono Yorukandia クリスタ・フォノ・ヨルカンディア	also Crimson S	
2007	Lucky Star	Miyuki Takara	Also OVA in 2008	
2007	Mokke	Yū 優		
2007	Mobile Suit Gundam 00	Kinue Crossroad		
2007	Shugo Chara!	Eriko Otomo		
2007	Maple Story	Nina		
2007	Genshiken Pt.2	Yuko Nakajima		
2007	Ghost Hound	Ogi Namie 小木ナミエ		
2008	My-Otome 0: S.ifr series	Lena Sayers	OVA	
2008	Macross Frontier	Sheryl Nome		
2008	Blassreiter	Mei-Fong Liu		
2008	Blue Dragon	Linda		
2008	Neo Angelique Abyss series	Angelique		
2008	Sekirei	Matsu	Also Pure Engagement 2010	
2008	Kemeko Deluxe!	Vanilla M. Repairs		
2009	Corpse Princess: Kuro	Flesh Backbone		
2009	The Girl Who Leapt Through Space	Itsuki Kannagi		
2009	Genji Monogatari Sennenki	Narrator, Murasaki no Ue		
2009	Basquash!	Spanky		
2009	Hanasakeru Seishōnen	Kajika Louisa Kugami Burnsworth		
2009	Sōten Kōro	ChoYoshimizuumi 丁美湖		
2009	Needless	Cruz Schild		
2009	Kanamemo	Yuuki Minami		
2009	Tokyo Magnitude 8.0	Risa		
2009	A Certain Scientific Railgun	Tsuzuri Tessō		
2009	Aoi Bungaku	Mizuki		
2010	Sound of the Sky	Filicia Heideman		
2010	Katanagatari	Biyorigō		
2010	Ikki Tousen: Xtreme Xecutor	Bachou Mouki		
2010	Major	Sakikawa	6th TV series	
2010	Lilpri	Kumi Ochiai 落合久美		
2010	Night Raid 1931	Ailing 愛玲		
2010	The Legend of the Legendary Heroes	Mother of Quill クイールの母		
2010	Model Suit Gunpla Builders Beginning G	Diane Lee	OVA	
2010	Battle Spirits: Brave	Heido Kenzo 兵堂剣蔵		
2010	Panty & Stocking with Garterbelt	Queen Babyi	Ep. 3	
2010	A Certain Magical Index II	Orsola Aquinas		
2011	Dream Eater Merry	"Garden" Engi Threepiece		
2011	Tiger & Bunny	Three sisters second daughter Lily 三姉妹次女リリー		
2011	Hanasaku Iroha	Hiroko Suehiro 末広広子		
2011	Heaven's Memo Pad	Sayuri Kuroda 黒田小百合	TV. Narumi and teacher of Ayaka.	
2011	The Mystic Archives of Dantalian	Mabel Nash メイベル・ナッシュ		
2011	Digimon Fusion	Totsuka 戸塚	season 3	
2011–12	Kimi to Boku series	Hanayo Sakura 佐倉花代		
2011	Chihayafuru	Chitose Ayase	Also season 2 in 2013	
2011	Mobile Suit Gundam AGE	Emily Asuno		
2011	Guilty Crown	Arisa Kuhouin		
2012	Queen's Blade Rebellion	Annalotte Kreutz		
2012	Shirokuma Cafe	Sasako		
2012	Accel World	Sky Raker / Fuuko Kurasaki (倉崎 楓子? Kurasaki Fūko)		
2012	Kids on the Slope	Yurika Fukahori		
2012	Utakoi	Ono no Komachi		
2012	Upotte!!	Ms. Mire		
2012	So, I Can't Play H!	Lisara Restall		
2012	From the New World	Saki Watanabe (Narrator, 36 years old)		
2012	K	Claudia Weissman		
2012	Ixion Saga DT	Emilia エミリア		
2012	JoJo's Bizarre Adventure	Poco's sister		
2012	Busou Shinki	Raptias		
2013	Karneval	Tsukumo		
2013	Photo Kano	Momoko Otani		
2013–present	Date A Live	Reine Murasame		
2013	Leviathan The Last Defense	Lizardman リザードマン		
2013	A Certain Scientific Railgun S	Tsuzuri Tessō		
2013	Day Break Illusion	Etia Visconti		
2013	Hyperdimension Neptunia: The Animation	Tsuigu ツイーグ		
2013	A Town Where You Live	Kiyomi Asakura		
2013	Aikatsu!	Tiara Yumesaki	season 2	
2013	Nagi-Asu: A Lull in the Sea	Miori Shiodome		
2013–14	Hunter × Hunter	Komugi	2011 TV Series	
2014	Nobunaga the Fool	Niccolò Machiavelli ニッコロ・マキャベリ		
2014	Yo-Kai Watch	Fumika "Fumi-chan" Kodama		
2014	Dragonar Academy	Veronica Lautreamont		
2014	Garo: The Animation	Jiruba		
2014	Celestial Method	Yuzuki's mother		
2014	Gundam Build Fighters Try	Mirai Kamiki		
2014	Girl Friend Beta	Tsukishiro Yoko 月白陽子		
2015	Minna Atsumare! Falcom Gakuen SC	Elie エリィ		
2015	Yurikuma Arashi	Reia Tsubaki		
2015	Fafner in the Azure: Exodus	Jeremy Lee Marcy		
2015	Gourmet Girl Graffiti	Woman lecturer 女講師		
2015	Magical Girl Lyrical Nanoha ViVid	Vikutoria Dahl Grun ヴィクトーリア・ダールグリュン		
2015	Rokka: Braves of the Six Flowers	Shetora シェトラ		
2015	Fate/kaleid liner Prisma Illya 2wei Herz	Child-Gil 子ギル	Ep. 8-10	
2015	Mr. Osomatsu	Totoko		
2015	Seraph of the End	Mahiru Hiiragi		
2016	Haven't You Heard? I'm Sakamoto	Yuka ユカ		
2016	Kabaneri of the Iron Fortress	Flashing fire 滅火		
2016	Rin-ne	Kain's mother	season 2	
2016	Fate/kaleid liner Prisma Illya 3rei!	Child-Gil 子ギル	Eps. 2–11	
2016	The Ancient Magus' Bride: Those Awaiting a Star	Silky (Silver)	OVA	
2016	Classicaloid	Tchaikovsky		
2016	The Kubikiri Cycle	Maki	OVA	
2017	Boruto: Naruto Next Generations	Sumire Kakei		
2017	18if	Yuko Sakurabe		
2017–23	The Ancient Magus' Bride	Silky (Silver)	Also season 2	
2018	Violet Evergarden	Cattleya Baudelaire		
2018	Legend of the Galactic Heroes: Die Neue These	Frederica Greenhill		
2018	Goblin Slayer	Sword Maiden		
2018	Fairy Tail	Anna Heartfilia		
2018	Skull-face Bookseller Honda-san	Koomote		
2019	Revisions	Yumiko Yazawa		
2019	Fruits Basket	Kisa's Mother		
2019	Star Twinkle PreCure	Tenjou, Scorpio Star Princess		
2019	YU-NO: A Girl Who Chants Love at the Bound of this World	Keiko Arima		
2019	Ahiru no Sora	Yuka Kurumatani		
2019	Fate/Grand Order - Absolute Demonic Front: Babylonia	Quetzalcoatl		
2020	Yo-kai Watch Jam - Yo-kai Academy Y: Close Encounters of the N Kind	Sandayu Koma		
2020	ID: Invaded	Ayako Narihisago		
2020	Great Pretender	Emma Thierry		
2020–present	Jujutsu Kaisen	Shoko Ieiri		
2021	True Cooking Master Boy	Mira		
2021	Cestvs: The Roman Fighter	Aggrippina		
2021	Night Head 2041	Miki Tachibana		
2021	Love Live! Superstar!!	Hana Hazuki		
2021	The Ancient Magus' Bride: The Boy From the West and the Knight of the Mountain Haze	Silky (Silver)	OVA	
2021	The Irregular at Magic High School: Reminiscence Arc	Honami Sakurai		
2022	Vermeil in Gold	Fatema		
2023	Good Night World	May / Sayaka Arima	ONA	
2025	Your Forma	Totoki		
2025	Hell Teacher: Jigoku Sensei Nube	Ritsuko Takahashi		
2025	Plus-Sized Misadventures in Love!	Yumeko Kōda		
2026	Roll Over and Die	Maria Afenjuns		
2026	Magical Sisters LuluttoLilly	Matsuri Hinoura		
2026	Please Excuse My Younger Brothers	Saho Narita		
2026	The Ogre's Bride	Sakurako Kiyama		
2026	Fool Night	Saeko Kanaeno	ONA	

=== Film ===
List of voice performances in feature film
Year	Title	Role	Notes	Source
2007	Inukami! The Movie	Imaru		
2009	Macross Frontier: Itsuwari no Utahime	Sheryl Nome		
2010	Fafner in the Azure: Heaven and Earth	Jeremy Lee Marcy		
2011	Macross Frontier: Sayonara no Tsubasa	Sheryl Nome		
2011	Hayate the Combat Butler! Heaven Is a Place on Earth	Suzune Ayasaki		
2012	Fairy Tail the Movie: Phoenix Priestess	Eclair		
2014	Yo-kai Watch: The Movie	Fumika Kodama		
2015	Date A Live Movie: Mayuri Judgement	Reine Murasame		
2015	Yo-kai Watch: Enma Daiō to Itsutsu no Monogatari da Nyan!	Komasan		
2017	Doraemon the Movie 2017: Great Adventure in the Antarctic Kachi Kochi	Mofusuke		
2019	Mr. Osomatsu: The Movie	Totoko		
2019	Yo-kai Watch Jam the Movie: Yo-Kai Academy Y - Can a Cat be a Hero?	Sandayu Koma		
2020	Goblin Slayer: Goblin's Crown	Sword Maiden		
2020	Doraemon: Nobita's New Dinosaur	Kyu		
2021	Jujutsu Kaisen 0	Shoko Ieiri		
2022	Mr. Osomatsu: Hipipo-Zoku to Kagayaku Kajitsu	Totoko		
2022	Drifting Home	Ferris Wheel Spirit		
2023	Rakudai Majo: Fūka to Yami no Majo	Patty		

=== Video games ===
List of voice performances in video games
Year	Title	Role	Notes	Source
2004	Harukanaru Toki no Naka de 3	Antoku 安徳天皇	PlayStation 2, PlayStation Portable	
2006	Everybody's Tennis	Hypomesus pretiosus japonicus チカ	PlayStation 2	
2008	Lucky Star: Ryōō Gakuen Ōtōsai	Miyuki Takara	PlayStation 2, PlayStation Portable	
2008	Rosario + Vampire: Tanabata's Miss Yokai Academy	Kotori Yunagi	Nintendo DS	
2009	Kemeko Deluxe!	Vanilla	Nintendo DS	
2009	Canvas 3: Pale Pastel	Nanami Chigusa	PlayStation 2, cast change from PC version	
2009	Macross Ultimate Frontier	Sheryl Nome	PlayStation Portable	
2009	Rune Factory 3	Pia	Nintendo DS	
2009	Sekirei: Gifts from the Future	Matsu	PlayStation 2	
2009	Luminous Arc 3	Aulmorde, Franc	Nintendo DS	
2010	Princess Lover!	Charlotte Hazelrink	PlayStation 2	
2010	Ar Tonelico Qoga	Akane, Beni Yorutsuki	PlayStation 3	
2010	End of Eternity	Reanbell	Xbox 360, PlayStation 3	
2010	Zangeki no Reginleiv	Freya	Wii	
2010	Busou Shinki Battle Masters	Raputiasu ラプティアス	PlayStation Portable	
2010	Last Ranker	Roza ロザ	PlayStation Portable	
2010	Another Century's Episode: R	Sheryl Nome	PlayStation 3	
2010	Koumajou Densetsu II: Stranger's Requiem	Yukari Yakumo	Windows	
2010	Final Fantasy XIV	Yda	Windows	
2010	The Legend of Heroes: Trails from Zero	Elie MacDowell エリィ・マクダエル	PlayStation Portable, Windows	
2010	Agarest Senki 2	Victoria	PlayStation 3, Windows	
2011	Valkyria Chronicles III	Riela Marceris	PlayStation Portable	
2011	Macross Triangle Frontier	Sheryl Nome	PlayStation Portable	
2011	The Legend of Heroes: Trails to Azure	Elie MacDowell エリィ・マクダエル	PlayStation Portable, Windows	
2011	Terror of the Stratus	Hawk 乃巣 Misogi 鷹乃巣禊	PlayStation Portable	
2012	Photo Kano	Momoko Ōtani	PlayStation Portable	
2012	Mugen Souls	Chou (neat) / Chou (de M) シュシュ（清楚） / シュシュ（ドM）	PlayStation 3, Windows	
2012	Conception: Ore no Kodomo o Undekure!	Arie	PlayStation Portable, PlayStation 4, Windows	
2012	Accel World: Awakening of the Silver Wings	Kurasaki Kaedeko 倉崎楓子	PlayStation 3, PlayStation Portable	
2012	Project X Zone	Riela Marceris, Reanbell	Nintendo 3DS	
2012	Time and Eternity	Makimona マキモナ	PlayStation 3	
2012	The Legend of Heroes: Trails from Zero Evolution	Elie MacDowell エリィ・マクダエル	PlayStation Vita, PlayStation 4, Nintendo Switch, Windows	
2012	Girl Friend Beta	Tsukishiro Yoko 月白陽子	iOS, Android	
2012	Tales of Xillia 2	Origin	PlayStation 3	
2013	Accel World: The Peak of Acceleration	Kurasaki Kaedeko 倉崎楓子	PlayStation 3, PlayStation Portable	
2013	Ebikore Photo Kano Kiss	Momoko Ōtani	PlayStation Vita	
2013	Summon Night 5	Alka アルカ	PlayStation Portable	
2013	Date A Live Rinne Utopia	Reine Murasame	PlayStation 3	
2013	Super Robot Wars Operation Extend	Sheryl Nome	PlayStation Portable	
2013	Final Fantasy XIV: A Realm Reborn	Yda	PlayStation 3, Windows, PlayStation 4, MacOS, PlayStation 5	
2013	Exstetra	Serene セレネー	Nintendo 3DS, PlayStation Vita	
2014	Kantai Collection	Z1	PC	
2014	The Legend of Heroes: Trails to Azure Evolution	Elie MacDowell エリィ・マクダエル	PlayStation Vita, PlayStation 4, Nintendo Switch, Windows	
2014	Fate/hollow ataraxia	Child-Gil	Windows, PlayStation Vita	
2015	Psycho-Pass: Mandatory Happiness	Chikaiyu Nadeshiko 誓湯撫子	Xbox One, PlayStation 4, PlayStation Vita, Windows	
2015	Final Fantasy XIV: Heavensward	Yda / Lyse	Windows, MacOS, PlayStation 3, PlayStation 4	
2015	Xuccess Heaven	Green Academy student	iOS, Android	
2015	Date A Live Twin Edition: Rio Reincarnation	Reine Murasame	PlayStation Vita	
2015	Project X Zone 2: Brave New World	Reanbell	Nintendo 3DS	
2015	Bloodborne: The Old Hunters	Woman doctor Yosefuka 女医ヨセフカ	PlayStation 4	
2016	Street Fighter V	Karin Kanzuki	PlayStation 4, Windows, Arcade	
2016	Fate/Grand Order	Child-Gil, Quetzalcoatl	iOS, Android	
2016	Summon Night 6	Alka アルカ	PlayStation 4, PlayStation Vita	
2016	Star Ocean: Integrity and Faithlessness	Fiore Burnelli	PlayStation 4, PlayStation 3	
2016	Toukiden 2	Tsubaki	PlayStation 3, PlayStation 4, PlayStation Vita, Windows	
2017	Warriors All-Stars	Sayo, Yomi	PlayStation 4, PlayStation Vita, Windows	
2017	Fire Emblem Heroes	Clair	iOS, Android	
2017	Accel World vs. Sword Art Online: Millennium Twilight	Fuuko Kurasaki/Sky Raker	PlayStation 4, PlayStation Vita, Windows	
2017	Fire Emblem Echoes: Shadows of Valentia	Clair	Nintendo 3DS	
2017	Final Fantasy XIV: Stormblood	Lyse	Windows, MacOS, PlayStation 4	
2017	Senko no Ronde 2	Sakurako Sanjo	PlayStation 4, Windows	
2017	Xenoblade Chronicles 2	Ten'i, Kiku	Nintendo Switch	
2018	The Legend of Heroes: Trails of Cold Steel IV	Elie MacDowell エリィ・マクダエル	PlayStation 4, Nintendo Switch, Windows	
2018	Dragalia Lost	Brunhilda / Mym	iOS, Android	
2019	The Seven Deadly Sins: Grand Cross	Valenti	iOS, Android	
2019	Azure Lane Crosswave	Suruga	PlayStation 4, Windows, Nintendo Switch	
2020	Mega Man X DiVE	Iris	iOS, Android	
2021	Bravely Default 2	Martha Lancer	Nintendo Switch, Windows	
2021	Alchemy Stars	Uriah, Victoria	iOS, Android	
2022	Genshin Impact	Yelan	iOS, Android, Windows, PlayStation 4, PlayStation 5, Nintendo Switch	
2023	Fire Emblem Engage	Alear (Female) リュール	Nintendo Switch	
2023	Punishing: Gray Raven	Han Ying	Android, iOS	
2023	RED: Pride of Eden	Elaine	Android, iOS	
2023	Path to Nowhere	Dreya	Android, iOS	
2023	Arknights	Virtuosa	Windows, Android, iOS	
2024	Persona 3 Reload	Chihiro Fushimi 伏見千尋	Xbox, PlayStation, PC	
2024	Teppen	Iris	Android, iOS	
2024	Zenless Zone Zero	Astra Yao	Windows, Android, iOS, PlayStation 5	
2024	Girls' Frontline 2: Exilium	Nemesis	Windows, Android, iOS	
2025	Honkai: Star Rail	Aglaea	Windows, Android, iOS	
2025	Persona 5: The Phantom X	Kumi Katayama	Windows, Android, iOS	

=== Drama CD ===
List of voice performances in drama CD
Year	Title	Role	Notes	Source
2008	Lucky ☆ Star	Miyuki Takara		
2008–09	Macross F Nyan Dra	Sheryl Nome		
2009	Sora wo Kakeru Shoujo Drama	Itsuki Kannagi		
2011	A Certain Magical Index	Orsola Aquinas		

=== Dubbing roles ===
List of voice performances in overseas dubbing
Year	Title	Role	Notes	Source
2007	Breaking and Entering	Beatrice "Bea" Ullmann ビー（ベアトリス）		
2011	The Three Musketeers	Constance Bonacieux コンスタンス		
2013	Planes	Aka pittokā 赤ピットカー		
2014	The Thundermans	Nora Thunderman ノーラ・サンダーマン		
2016	Once Upon a Time	Anna アナ		
2016	Purple Noon	Marge マルジュ・デュヴァル		
2016	Enthiran	Sana サナ		
2016	The Fundamentals of Caring	Dot ドット		
2016	The Finest Hours	Miriam Pentinen Webber ミリアム		
2016	An American Girl Story – Maryellen 1955: Extraordinary Christmas	Maryellen Larkin メリーエレン・ラーキン		
2017	C.B. Strike	Robin Ellacott ロビン・エラコット		
2018	Isle of Dogs	Nutmeg ナツメグ		
2018	100 Days My Prince	Kim So-hye キム・ソヘ		
2018	Fantastic Beasts: The Crimes of Grindelwald	Queenie Goldstein クイニ―・ゴールドスタイン		
2019	Shazam!	Darla Dudley フェイス・ハーマン / ミーガン・グッド		
2021	Night of the Living Dead	Barbra バーバラ		
2022	Fantastic Beasts: The Secrets of Dumbledore	Queenie Goldstein クイニ―・ゴールドスタイン		
2023	Shazam! Fury of the Gods	Darla Dudley フェイス・ハーマン / ミーガン・グッド		

==== Animation ====
- The Fairly OddParents - Veronica
- Ice Age - Peaches
- My Little Pony: Friendship is Magic - Silver Spoon
