= List of Date A Live characters =

The Date A Live light novel and anime series features a diverse cast of characters created by Kōshi Tachibana and designed by Tsunako.

== Main characters ==
=== Shido Itsuka ===
五河 士道 (Itsuka Shidō)
Voiced by: Nobunaga Shimazaki, Saeko Zōgō (Shiori), Yukiko Aruga (childhood) (Japanese); Jessie James Grelle, Ryan Elizabeth Reynolds (Shiori), Mikaela Krantz (childhood) (English)
The protagonist of Date A Live. Shido is a kindhearted young man who possesses a strange power that allows him to seal the powers of a Spirit in his body with a kiss; however, the seal will only work if the Spirit holds enough trust or affection toward him to allow it. This ability allows him to seal and contain 99% of a Spirit's power. After sealing a Spirit's powers, there will be an invisible link connecting him and the Spirit, through which a portion of the sealed power will flow back to the Spirit if said Spirit's mental state becomes unstable, and back to Shido once the Spirit's mental state stabilizes. In volume 5, he discovers he can access the powers of the Spirits, including Tohka's Sandalphon, other than Kotori's healing flames that he has sealed. While Shido normally maintains a close bond with each of the Spirits he saves throughout the course of the series due to promises he has made, he is most often shown to be particularly closest to Tohka and Origami.
After sealing the power of multiple Spirits, Shido's own power goes unstable in Volume 12, changing his personality and turning him into a threat. To restore Shido's normal self, Kotori and the other Spirits must come together to kiss him, so as to calm down his unbalanced sealed power, which will cause a disaster worse than what had happened 30 years ago. While having a completely different personality, Shido is conceited, displaying a dark demeanor and tends to 'impress' familiar people, by showcasing the powers of the Spirits he had sealed (In this case, the power belonging to Yoshino, Miku, Natsumi and Origami). Near the end of volume 12, during his date with Yoshino, DEM interfered and tried to capture Shido, but he destroyed the team of 20 Bandersnatch easily using a powerful spirit flash. Later, Shido's sealed powers went completely berserk during his date with Tohka due to the Second Spirit's noise calling out for him. Fortunately, Shido was saved by Phantom, who then weakened Shido's spirit barrier, so the Spirits can successfully break through to kiss him.
Assumed to have been abandoned by his birth mother, Shido lives with his foster sister Kotori. He has blue hair and brown eyes, and is in his second year in Raizen High School, class 2–4. He was in despair for a time after being abandoned and subsequently adopted, which made him sensitive to similar feelings from others and wanting to bring them out of it, fueling his desire to save the Spirits. He meets his real sister Mana Takamiya later in volume 3. In volume 7, Westcott briefly addresses him as Takamiya before switching back to Itsuka.
Volume 17 reveals more details about his origin: born Shinji Takamiya, he actually lived around the time the first spatial quake hit and met the First Spirit, a nameless entity in the form of a girl, whom he called Mio. Over time, Shinji taught her about the world and life and the two fell in love with each other; until Wescott attempted to capture Mio and killed Shinji in the process. In an attempt to bring him back to life, Mio absorbed Shinji's corpse into her body and re-created him as a human/Spirit hybrid, explaining Shido's ability to seal and manifest Spirit powers. As it turns out, Mio has been distributing Sephira crystals among humans to perfect and refine their powers so that, in time, Shido can obtain them and become a being of unlimited magical power like herself so they can be together for all eternity.

=== Tohka Yatogami ===
夜刀神 十香 (Yatogami Tōka)
Voiced by: Marina Inoue (Japanese); Michelle Rojas (English)
Tohka is the first Spirit saved by Shido. She transfers into his class at the end of the first volume. Shido named her after the day of their first meeting, April 10th (though one kanji is different, the tenth day of a month is pronounced as Tohka). Reine later added the Yatogami surname for her. She has long dark purple hair and purple eyes. She is ignorant of the ways of the world, but nevertheless has a normal sense of embarrassment. As Shido was the first person to ever show kindness and acceptance towards her, Tohka develops strong feelings for him, which she is initially shown to be unable to understand when she gets jealous after seeing Shido accidentally kiss Yoshino. However, upon learning that Yoshino is a Spirit like herself, she decides to support Shido in his cause to save other Spirits such as Kurumi. She not only participates in battles at times, but even provides comfort and emotional support for Shido whenever he finds himself faced with a dilemma. As of volume 12, Tohka comes to fully realize that she is in love with Shido.
Tohka gets captured once by DEM Industries at the end of volume 6. Then in volume 7 upon seeing Shido ambushed and about to be killed by Ellen, she is filled with such despair that she underwent a transformation called Inversion, becoming noticeably far more hostile, and attacking everyone in sight, including Shido. Fortunately, Shido manages to bring Tohka back to her senses by kissing her. Westcott calls her Inverse state the Demon King, adding that this transformed state is the actual form of Spirits like her in the bordering dimension that they come from before manifesting in this world.
Her Angel is Sandalphon, which takes the form of a broadsword, usually with a throne that doubles as the scabbard, although at times it seems as though she can do just as much damage with or without it, using her hands to project dark energy spheres or bolts in order to slice through inanimate objects with ease. Her Astral Dress, Adonai Melek, consists of a purple ballgown. At full power she shatters the throne (volume 1) and combines the pieces with the sword turning the blade into Halvanhelev (the Last Sword) lengthening the blade several meters long, dramatically increasing her powers and can be charged to unleash an ultimate blow. Fortunately, the one time she used Halvanhelev Shido was able to stop and seal her before the unstable energy was unleashed. When she falls into utter despair, her Angel changes to Nahemah, the Qliphoth counterpart of Sandalphon and her Astral Dress becomes darker in color and more revealing. Her AST and Ratatoskr codename is <Princess>.

- Tenka Yatogami (夜刀神天香, Yatogami Tenka)

Voiced by: Marina Inoue (Japanese); Michelle Rojas (English)
The original personality of Tohka Yatogami, who was born from the crystal of Sephira Malchut. Also known as Inversion or Dark Current. Shadow awakens and captures Tohka's body if Tohka is exposed to the strongest influence of negative emotions.

=== Kotori Itsuka ===
五河 琴里 (Itsuka Kotori)
Voiced by: Ayana Taketatsu (Japanese); Bryn Apprill (English)
Kotori is Shido's foster sister and the commander of Ratatoskr. Her parents are also employees of Ratatoskr. Originally she was a human but gained the power of a Spirit five years ago, at the same time she was saved by Shido. There is no record of how Kotori obtained her Spirit powers; does not know why her and Shido's memories seem vague or missing from that crucial point. When her Spirit powers overwhelm her, she retains almost no memories of any events that transpire during that time. She temporarily takes back her powers from Shido to save him from Kurumi with her power being sealed by Shido once more later on. The reason another sealing was needed was because Kotori took all 100% of her power back breaking the Spirit Link between them that would cause her powers to return to Shido when she calmed down. At the second sealing, she and Shido both regain their lost memories of the first sealing: an entity called <Phantom> granted her Spirit powers when she was left alone at home and crying (with which she destroyed everything around her and nearly killed Shido), told her to kiss Shido if she wanted him to live (which was how Kotori knew about the method to seal a Spirit's powers, and also the ability to heal from serious injuries that Shido got from her), and afterwards stripped them of their memories of its existence, as well as the entire incident. This memory also disproves Origami's belief that Kotori was the one who killed her parents. Kotori is the first/third Spirit saved by Shido.
She has long red hair, often in twin tails, and her eyes are red. She is almost always shown with a Chupa Chups lollipop in her mouth. She displays two very different characters, bordering on split personality. When she wears white ribbons in her hair, she is completely relaxed and peaceful and shows an immature, spoiled character that's always clinging to her brother. When on Ratatoskr's mothership, Fraxinus, or dealing with major situations, she switches to black ribbons taking on an arrogant, superior attitude to everyone including Shido, but nevertheless still cares deeply for him as shown on many occasions. This difference in character is revealed in volume 4 to be due to Shido giving Kotori black ribbons as a present for her ninth birthday after sealing her powers, and telling her to be strong as long as she wears them. However she is extremely weak to horror-related things, and reacts strongly to them regardless of character.
Her Angel is Camael, a halberd with a flame edge that is capable of changing shape to cannon that extends to her right elbow. The cannon takes some time to charge up and absorb Kotori's flames and has a devastating attack that blew a hole clean through Zaphkiel and almost killed Kurumi. Kotori with her powers has the ability to recover from severe injuries, which Shido is able to use unconsciously while her powers are sealed inside him. It's represented by healing flames coming out of the wounds. Her Astral Dress, Elohim Gibor (meaning "Almighty God" in Hebrew), is a kimono which mainly consists of the colors pink and cream. In her Spirit form she also has horns growing on her head, with her black ribbons tied on them. Her irises are also a slightly brighter tint of pink in this state. Her AST codename is <Efreet>.

=== Origami Tobiichi ===
鳶一 折紙 (Tobiichi Origami)
Voiced by: Misuzu Togashi (Japanese); Michelle Lee (English)
Origami is a highly intelligent classmate of Shido who is athletic, "beautiful", and the most famous person in Shido's school. She is often described as doll-like in appearance with short white hair and blue-grey eyes. She somehow knew Shido from a time he had comforted her in a distress state that he just doesn't recall at all. She is the only human "girlfriend" of Shido, and out of all the other girls who like him, she is the most aggressive in her pursuit of him showing no bounds in her attempts to learn more about him, get closer to him, or even on trying to get more intimate with him. Her hatred of Spirits stems from a Spirit who killed her parents five years prior when it blasted her parents after they managed to escape their burning home. Due to this, she joined the AST, in which she holds the rank of Master Sergeant, in an attempt to find the Spirit supposedly responsible for the fire <Efreet> and kill her. She managed to utilize the Ace CR-Unit <White Licorice>, when reluctantly believing Shido who tells her that while Kotori, who turns out to be Efreet, unintentionally started the fire, she did not kill Origami's parents and that there were several Spirits involved.
This singular aim of revenge has enough drive within her to overcome her calm, calculating, and composed personality for her to go to the extent of disregarding orders and hysteria, getting her into trouble on more than one occasion. Notably, she was about to be discharged from the AST in volume 5 until Westcott intervened, after which her punishment was reduced to two months of not being allowed to use Realizers. At the end of volume 9, Origami left the AST to join DEM as a wizard, only for a short time.
In volume 10, a corrupted Origami lured Shido into a trap and later attempted to kill the Spirits with him out of the way, but was eventually defeated by Tohka. Origami just then heard the noise of Phantom and is granted with the power of a Spirit. Unfazed, she persuaded Kurumi to send her to the past in an attempt to fend off Phantom who at the time she thought was the Spirit who caused her parents' deaths, five years prior. However, Origami was proven wrong just moments after she fended Phantom away, and the truth hit her very hard. Recognizing the extensive damage caused by Origami's light beams and remembering the silhouette of an angel, she realized who killed her parents—Origami herself. Upon returning from the past in an emotionless despair state, Origami started attacking the hospital, the Fraxinus and the surroundings where Shido and the other Spirits are at. Shido bent on reverting Origami to her normal self, now that she is beyond recovery. Requesting Kurumi's help, she and Shido trip to the past and comforted a young Origami who is in despair on losing her parents. At that moment, Shido and Kurumi realized that their actions have indirectly influence Origami's behavior in the future. During a second trip, he manages to save Origami's parents from her future self's attack, drastically altering Origami's future.
Here in the new timeline, Origami has long hair and a different personality as compared to her previous timeline self. The irony of fate is her parents still died due to a car accident. She also was an ex-AST member, but this time her reason for joining and leaving were different. Despite the time changed, Origami actually still manifests her Spirit power with all her previous timeline memories. Origami was invited by Shido to a date but turns into <Devil> upon seeing Efreet's flames healing Shido's wound. With the help of the other Spirits, Shido managed to reach the inverse Origami who was fighting over the control of her body with her previous timeline self. Origami finally succeeded in gaining control over her body and broke free. Shido then took this chance to kiss Origami and sealed her power. At the end of the volume, Shido told Origami that he'll be depending on her (as part of the Spirit team) for any future incidents and she accepted with a smile. Since the beginning Origami only saw Shido as reliance on her emotions, but after he saves her she sincerely comes to love him and dreams of having a family with Shido. She becomes the eighth Spirit saved by Shido.
Her angel is Metatron which is a large crown that floats around her head, which can call out larger pieces of floating golden pillars that seem to resemble to a larger crown that surrounds her. Her powers are mainly the control of light energy. In her inverse form, her Astral Dress, Ehyeh, turns dark and becomes more revealing. Kotori called the inversed Origami a 'worst spirit' comparable to Kurumi. Her codename is <Angel>.

== Spirits ==
Spirits are extraterrestrial beings whose arrival is usually preceded by a spatial quake. These spatial quakes are usually involuntary, but they can also cause spatial quakes voluntarily. Each Spirit has a numerical kanji in their name. They also each possess an Astral Dress as well as an Angel, which are respectively named after the Divine Names of the Sephiroth of the Kabbalistic Tree of life corresponding to the numerical kanji in their names, and the archangels governing the corresponding Sephirot. Each Spirit has a unique ability, and each displays different levels of knowledge about Earth. When a Spirit inverses so does the angel who gets replaced by a demon of the corresponding Qliphoth, e.g. Tohka's angel Sandalphon of her Malkuth Sephira is replaced by the demon Nahemah associated with the corresponding Qimranut Qliphah, and Tobichi's angel Metatron of Kether Sephira by Satan of the Bacikal Qliphah. It is later revealed that the source of a Spirit's power is a gem known as a Sephira Crystal. When a human is exposed to a crystal, they receive whatever power the crystal stores inside.

=== Mio Takamiya ===
崇宮澪 (Takamiya Mio)
Voiced by: Aya Endō (Japanese); Barrett Nash (English)
Mio is the "First Spirit" born when the <Spirit Formula> gathers all of the world's mana in a single location by the work of Isaac Westcott, Elliot Woodman, and Ellen Mathers, thirty years prior. However, her birth involuntarily caused the first spatial quake, destroying a huge part of Eurasia. Mio had the mentality of an infant and continuously fluctuated between reality and another dimension that was created as a result of her birth. Because of this, a smaller spatial quake would happen every time she appeared in the world, ravaging the world a few months after her birth. Her codename is <Deus>.
One day, she was approached by a boy named Shinji Takamiya, who gave the naked girl his jacket and decided to bring her home with him. Mio received her name at their first meeting on, the 30th. Shinji also gave her key insight into the concept of love. While living with Shinji and Mana, Mio quickly gained self-awareness of the real world by reading books, following the radio, and watching television and cassettes. One time, Shinji took Mio around town, and the ocean caught her attention. Mio was so overjoyed that she cried. However, DEM uncovered Mio's location, forcing her to flee with Shinji. While running, Woodman appeared before them, but he allowed them to pass after asking Mio if she was happy being with Shinji. Despite this, Westcott revealed that he had abducted Mana but was willing to trade her for Mio. Denying him, Westcott shot Shinji in the chest using a gun. This caused Mio to finally realize how much Shinji meant to her and escape. Her personality and demeanor change from very melancholic to extremely goal-driven, including a willingness to sacrifice countless humans to achieve her wish.
Mio absorbed Shinji's corpse into her and recreates him by nurturing "Shido" in her womb before giving birth to him—becoming his new mother. She planned to entrust him with her power so that he could become her eternal lover. Since the body of a normal human is too frail to accept all her power at once, Mio only gave Shido the power to take in the Spirit's power. Then, she divided her powers, planting them like seeds into young girls for Shido to gradually take their powers one by one. However, humans were not compatible with the Qlipha Crystals she created, causing them to turn into monsters and go berserk. Therefore, Mio decided to reverse their properties, turning them into Sephira Crystals to make them more compatible, starting with Nia Honjou. Around this time, Mio successfully gave birth to Shido and left him to be adopted by the Itsuka family who were acquaintances with Mana.
At some point, one of the berserk Spirits attacked a young Kurumi Tokisaki, though Mio managed to save her, still willing to trick Kurumi into becoming a Spirit under the premise of being an ally of justice who was saving the world from Spirits. One day, however, Kurumi invited Mio over to her friend Sawa Yamauchi's place. This caused Mio to be caught in the act of removing the Qlipha Crystal from the body of the Efreet Spirit, who was revealed to be none other than Sawa. This revelation caused Kurumi to start transforming into her Inverse Form. However, much to Mio's surprise, Kurumi stopped her transformation by using her Fourth Bullet to reverse time and return to a moment before she started feeling overwhelmed by despair. Mio sincerely apologizes and states that she has no ill will towards Kurumi, but she cannot stop until she has entrusted her power to those chosen among humanity.

=== Yoshino Himekawa ===
氷芽川 四糸乃 (Himekawa Yoshino)
Voiced by: Iori Nomizu (Japanese); Tia Ballard (English)
The second Spirit saved by Shido. She has the appearance of a young girl around Kotori's age, with long blue hair and matching eyes. She has a very shy personality, depending on her rabbit puppet in her left hand, Yoshinon, most of the time for communication. She is a very docile Spirit, and does not attack the AST when they attack her, not even summoning her Angel, reasoning that if she does not like being hurt, they would also not like it. However when she loses [Yoshinon] she will be at a loss, and when attacked will summon her Angel, but only to defend herself. Shido meets her seemingly to be a lost child in the rain. After several encounters, Shido made the decision to protect Yoshino for her incredible kindness, and aid her to speak precisely for herself other than rely on Yoshinon.
Her Angel is Zadkiel, a giant rabbit puppet that she summons and controls with her right hand. It is capable of breathing out freezing air that freezes the AST members along with their territory. Other than her Angel, she is also capable of manipulating the three states of water, but is usually seen manipulating ice, however there is a tiny amount of Spirit Energy in each drop of the rain that appears whenever she manifests herself in this world. Her Astral Dress, El, consists of a green rabbit suit and a white petticoat. Her AST codename is <Hermit>.

- Yoshinon (よしのん, Yoshinon)

A split personality that was born out of Yoshino's wish to not be alone and not have her powers hurt others. It is Yoshino's ideal self, as well as her friend. Unlike Yoshino, it speaks out with confidence and is prone to offending others. It acts as Yoshino's pillar of support, allowing her to keep calm enough to not attack others. It usually does the speaking for Yoshino, appearing to speak through ventriloquism by her doing, but their thoughts are independent of each other, and she has no control over what it says. Yoshinon's personality only comes out while Yoshino is wearing the puppet and both personalities consider the puppet to be Yoshinon. Yoshino is always the human shaped spirit Yoshino, Yoshinon is always the puppet so there are never any cases where Yoshinon takes over Yoshino's body, other than the arm holding the puppet, and Yoshino never becomes the puppet.

=== Kurumi Tokisaki ===
時崎 狂三 (Tokisaki Kurumi)
Voiced by: Asami Sanada (Japanese); Alexis Tipton (English)
The most dangerous Spirit that appears in the series. Kurumi transfers into Shido's class in volume 3 and even announces that she is a Spirit. She is attracted to Shido from the very start, gaining the envy of Tohka and Origami. However, Kurumi reveals to Shido that she transferred to Raizen High School in order to eat him, or specifically the power that he has within him, to gain a large amount of life. Her left eye is an inorganic golden clock face, representing her remaining time (essentially measuring how much life she has left). Although she is prone to killing people without a second thought, there is a twisted justice to her actions, and she cares a bit about animals. She has so far only killed humans who are delinquents, and has a history with Mana, as Mana has been repeatedly killing Kurumi, but fails due to the fact that Kurumi keeps reappearing through the use of her clones. After a failed attempt to dissuade Kurumi on a triple date, a battle occurred on the school's rooftop and Kurumi retreats from Kotori's overwhelming power, after which Kurumi no longer attends the school. In the volume's epilogue Kurumi is seen regaining her time using her shadow powers to absorb the life of people within a building just enough to knock them out for a bit, but without killing them to "avoid attracting attention". She seems to have taken a genuine liking to Shido as she appears in several side stories forcing him to do something with her for fun, but without trying to "eat" or kill him.
She reappears to help Shido rescue Tohka who has been captured by DEM Industries and roaming on the streets alone due to Miku's intervention. It is revealed that Kurumi had been looking for and had failed to find the "Second Spirit", who was captured by DEM and held somewhere, and was the only one who knew the location and identity of the "First Spirit", the one that caused the spatial quake 30 years ago. In the middle of volume 10, Kurumi helped Origami return to the past on her request, and then sent Shido back 5 years meeting Kurumi's past-self on her behalf for resolve Origami, as her current berserk state, is unstoppable. In volume 12, Kurumi tried to retrieve the Second Spirit from a DEM plane carrying the spirit, but destroyed by Shido's spirit power earlier on and found out that she had escaped. After Origami's appearance in the new timeline and the conflict with Mukuro is resolved, Kurumi resurfaces before who has also retained memories of the original world; Shido, Tohka, and Origami are stunned to see Kurumi has returned to school. Kurumi stipulates a challenge between Shido and her; whoever makes the other fall in love first will be able allowed to accomplish his or her goal. Throughout most of the series, Kurumi strongly refused to have her powers sealed by Shido for the sake of her goal. After she comes to fully realize that she is in love with him, however, she later willingly has them sealed in Volume 19 so as to give Shido the power he needed to deal with Mio, the First Spirit.
Her Angel is Zaphkiel, which takes the form of a massive clock face with a musket and a flintlock pistol taking the place of the minute and hour hands of the clock, and which allows her to control time. She is able to summon her past selves to fight or take her place as they are essentially Kurumi herself. This not only allows her to cheat death by summoning herself from before her death, but also makes it more difficult for Shido to reach her; such as when Shido was able to persuade a clone on top of the school but was interrupted when she killed that version of herself for showing weakness, circumventing any emotional persuasions the same way as physical injuries. From within her shadow they can reach out their arms and grab people to hold them or to drag them into the shadow which somehow ends up with the person seeming to have exploded when the area is shown later. While in her Astral Dress, she wears her black hair in twin tails, with the hair on her left side longer than her right. While not in her Astral Dress, her hair is tied up slightly differently, with both sides being of the same length except for the fringe covering her left eye, showing only her red right eye. Her AST codename is <Nightmare>.

=== Yamai ===
八舞 (Yamai)
Together, they are the fourth/fifth Spirit saved by Shido. Similar in age to Shido, Kaguya and Yuzuru are identical twins, even being described as "clones" since they both split from the same Yamai Spirit, with the reason for the split as well as the original Yamai's personality both being unknown. Although they are two different, independent individuals, strictly speaking they are still one Spirit, Yamai. They both have long orange hair and mercury colored eyes. They are well known to people who know about Spirits as well as the general population due to causing a major atmospheric change when they duel while having a significant amount of witnesses. However the spatial quakes they cause have few to no casualties due to them manifesting high up in the sky. Their constant duels stem from both of them arguing about who is the real Yamai. Both of them have dueled in various fashions, with 25 wins apiece and 49 draws after 99 matches. Upon seeing Shido they agreed their 100th and final match to be who can seduce him first.
However deep down they each wanted the other to live, resulting in the both of them asking Shido to choose the other. When they learned of each other's true thoughts, they got angry enough at each other for not wanting to live, to fight again, this time to see who would run out of energy first. The real winner is revealed to be decided by who loses the winner disappears, or "survival of the weakest." However Shido managed to stop them and give them the option of both living on as Yamai, as well as him sealing both their powers together. They both realized that what they really wanted, was for both to live on together. Being grateful to him for giving them that option, they kiss him together, which seals their powers. They join Shido's school, transferring to class 2–3, the class beside Shido's.
Their Angel is Raphael, whose true form is a bow and arrow weapon, El Kanaph, which has a high penetration capability, and is formed by combining their weapons. They both possess the power to control air currents. Their Astral Dresses, Elohim Tzabaoth, are visually masochistic, being covered in a dark colored coat with various parts of their bodies being covered by straps, Kaguya's being purple and Yuzuru's being blue. Both also have locks which possess torn off chains protruding from them, Kaguya's being on her neck, right hand, and right leg, and Yuzuru's being on her neck, left hand, and left leg. Their Ratatoskr codename is <Berserk>.

- Kaguya Yamai (八舞 耶倶矢, Yamai Kaguya)

Voiced by: Maaya Uchida (Japanese); Brittney Karbowski (English)
Her personality is outgoing and very highly spoken of herself to the point that she doesn't always think statements through. The resulting effects from her outspokenness can make her seem childish or immature. She has her long orange colored hair braided up. Her main weapon is El Re'em, a lance.

- Yuzuru Yamai (八舞 夕弦, Yamai Yuzuru)

Voiced by: Sarah Emi Bridcutt (Japanese); Megan Shipman (English)
Personality-wise, she speaks in a distinctive manner in an almost robotic structure with her intent of the statement stated beforehand in a one word sentence. She is reserved however she will not hesitate to point out the flaws within Kaguya's arguments. She looks identical to Kaguya, albeit being slightly more well-endowed than her twin. Other differences include her hair being braided into three portions and her expression appears listless. Her main weapon is El Nahash, a chain.

=== Miku Izayoi ===
誘宵 美九 (Izayoi Miku)
Voiced by: Minori Chihara (Japanese); Jad Saxton (English)
The sixth Spirit saved by Shido. Miku first appears in volume 6 of the series and season 2 of the anime. She is introduced as a student of Rindōji Girls' Academy who resents humankind, especially men. She also works as a very famous and popular idol singer. She has violet hair and eyes, and she is always seen with a yellow flower-shaped hair clip in her hair. Shido's initial approach with Miku ended badly, so he cross-dresses as a girl called Shiori to get close to Miku until she finds "Shiori" is unaffected by her angel Solo and really becomes curious to have "her". Shido finds Miku annoying for not understanding fairness and people's well-being. After Miku challenged Shiori to a performance bet at Tengu Square and lost, Miku still refuses Shiori's general friendship only to get greatly shocked from discovering Shido's true gender and causes all eyewitnesses to fall under her voice control (except Tohka) to forcefully see if men like Shido can truly care about others than oneself.
At the age of 15, Miku begun her career as an idol singer using the stage name Tsukino Yoimachi (宵待 月乃, Yoimachi Tsukino). However, when she refuses to sleep with a TV producer to resolve her album, rumors about scandals began to spread and eventually, her agent and male fans abandon her. She attempts to reconnect with her fans by singing, but suffers psychogenic aphonia on stage and loses her voice. This leads her to contemplate suicide until Phantom approaches her and gives her current Spirit powers. Eventually, after Shido rescues Tohka and proves his vow to become Miku's fan no matter what the risk, she deliberately initiates the kiss to allow him to seal her powers and begins to sing again for everyone. She loves Shido to the point of professing that he is her 'darling' around others.
Her Angel is Gabriel, which takes the form of an organ complete with speakers, through which she can transmit and strongly amplify her voice, and by extension her sound-based powers, of which she has demonstrated three so far: March, which enhances the listeners' physical strength, Rondo, which generates sound pressure in the form of a wall and is her primary form of defense and attack, and Solo, which brainwashes her listeners to cause them to be devoted to her, but can be blocked out by a pair of earplugs. A devoted follower will refer to Miku as Onee-sama (formal Japanese for big sister) and think or do things they normally wouldn't do, even if unasked, to help her out no matter how insane the action, such as what Kotori and crew were about to do as punishment to all the people, especially Shido, who had hurt Miku before being interrupted. Her Astral Dress, Shaddai El Chai, adds a yellow crescent moon to the hair clip, as well as a number of white flowers in her hair. The Astral Dress itself consists of a mainly yellow dress with some blue parts as well as white frills. Her Ratatoskr codename is <Diva>.

=== Natsumi Kyouno ===
鏡野 七罪 (Kyōno Natsumi)
Voiced by: Ayumi Mano (Japanese); Katelyn Barr (English)
The seventh Spirit is Natsumi who first appears in Volume 8 saved by Shido. Her initial appearance is a healthy young adult, but her true form is a sickly little girl. In both of these forms, she has emerald colored hair and eyes. She acts hostile towards Shido after believing that he saw her true form (which he did not actually see). As the beginning of her revenge, she disguises as Shido in his school to try and ruin his life, but she was found out by the real Shido, as well as Tohka and Origami who saw through her disguise by the smallest details. She later threatens Shido in which he has to find out who she was disguising as in one of the twelve photos of missing people he knows. After Shido finds out who she was disguising as, Haniel, for some reason, has its mirror break which releases the people who were already captured. Natsumi, who was in a nervous state, had also reverted into her true form in front of Shido and his friends who were captured. Most likely this was because Shido 'won' the game which shattered Haniel's mirror breaking all the spells it was maintaining, such as the one imprisoning the others and the other one making Natsumi look like a voluptuous young adult. As Natsumi felt embarrassed from having her true form seen, she transforms back into her adult form and alters Shido and the others into children, and flies away on Haniel.
In Volume 9, her hiding place was later found by the Fraxinus and Natsumi escaped to an inhabited mountain side. There, she was attacked by Ellen and got heavily injured. Shido and the other Spirits rescued Natsumi then transported to the Fraxinus. Kotori and the others affected by Natsumi's magic were turned back to normal as well as her transformation ability was released when she lost consciousness. Natsumi was later brought to an underground facility in the city owned by Ratatoskr where Shido attempted to seal her powers with the help of Kotori and the others present. However, his plan failed when Natsumi escaped from the underground facility after having too much negative thought about the great treatment Shido & the others gave her. Natsumi later assisted Shido and the five Spirits to stop three artificial satellites sent by DEM from destroying Tenguu City which they succeeded in doing so. Natsumi then initiates the kiss with Shido to allow her powers to be sealed, upon being satisfied by Shido's response on a question and request to confirm how important she is to him.
Her Angel is Haniel, which takes the form of a broomstick. Its ability can transform the target into any form Natsumi wants. This can be people, objects, whatever she desires. The angel has a gem on the tip that can turn into a mirror which can entrap anyone inside. Her power can also be used on Haniel itself to mimic another Spirit's Angel and its abilities, but to a lesser degree. For example, she used it against DEM's third satellite by mimicking Tohka's Sandalphon, to create an attack wave of her own. Her codename is <Witch>.

=== Nia Honjou ===
本条 二亜 (Honjō Nia)
Voiced by: Hitomi Nabatame (Japanese), Mallorie Rodak (English)
The "Second Spirit", and Nia is also the ninth Spirit first mentioned in volume 7. She has the appearance of a girl in her late teens with grey hair and blue eyes, she is confirmed to be at least 45 having been one of the first humans to be transformed into a Spirit after the event 30 years ago. Before being captured by DEM, she was a highly successful manga artist, under the pseudo-name Sōji Honjō, the author of one of Shido's favorite manga, "Silver Bullet" (which having been written long ago made him assume Sōji was her father before she corrected him). Due to the abilities of her angel, she doesn't trust people, and only loves "2-D" since the characters are always as they are perceived without hiding anything about their persons or their history, which made her an obsessive otaku as a result. She refers to Shido as "Boy" in a teasing sort of older sister figure way, as well as other nicknames for the other Spirits as well.
After having been accidentally freed by Inverse Shido in Volume 12, Nia returned to her usual lifestyle, but was found collapsed outside her apartment by Shido as he walked home carrying groceries, having fainted from hunger. After feeding and helping her shop for manga, Shido attempted to seal her by cosplaying as a character from one of her favorite series, only to slip up with the character's actions and personality whilst trying to seal her, which caused her to hate him. An attempt by Ratatoskr to make her fall for a game character identical to Shido backfired when Nia discovered that the company who made the game was related to Ratatoskr, then she was challenged by Kotori and the other Spirits in a competition to see who could sell the most manga at a convention, which she accepted. Despite the efforts of the Spirits, even making some calls to friends, and even Miku's fans to try and out sell, Nia's manga won the competition, only for her to agree to read it regardless. When Nia discovered that the manga itself was a retelling of Shido's attempts to save the Spirits as told from their perspective (after having confirmed that this all happened and that they were happy he did), she relented. However, before she could be sealed, DEM unblocked her memories of all the torture she went through the past five years, which caused her psyche to collapse and begin to turn Inverse. After Artemisia removed her Qlipha Crystal from her and was absorbed by Westcott, Shido kisses Nia to seal her remaining powers before the removal process inducted on her could kill her. After going having her condition stabilized, she revealed that there are no "pure" Spirits, and that all Spirits present were once human like she was.
Her Angel, Ratziel, takes the form of a tome (more specifically a bible) and holds the ability to uncover facts, both general knowledge and also the person life histories of given people. An additional power of Ratziel is the ability to write a small insert into the future to cause an event to happen regardless, in fact what Nia writes in the book will become reality. As she did by drawing a sketch of Shido falling on top of Tohka during their visit to the shrine on New Year's Day in Volume 14. Having lost her Qlipha crystal and subsequently <Beelzebub> by Westcott, Nia can search for information, but that said information is no longer perceivable, and the use of her second ability is also limited. Her codename is <Sister>.

=== Mukuro Hoshimiya ===
星宮 六喰 (Hoshimiya Mukuro)
Voiced by: Akari Kageyama (Japanese); Kristen McGuire (English)
The tenth spirit to appear and is the 9th to be saved by Shido, who first appeared in Volume 14. She has golden colored hair and amber eyes, and has an archaic way of speaking, even referring to herself in third person as "Muku" (むく). Due to the solitude she was feeling in space, she sealed her own "heart" in order to cope in the vast emptiness, which made her only think logically, but with an icy cold, robot-like, demeanor. After having her emotions unsealed with a copy of her Angel via Haniel, Mukuro regained her true personality, which in contrast to her sealed one, is very emotional. Mukuro approaches the Fraxinus and Westcott's <Beelzebub> for invading her territory in emptiness of the cosmos. She takes things like love very seriously, forbidding Shido from being with the other Spirits and even going as far as to seal away their memories of him. Despite sealing the memories of all Shido's allies, the action inadvertently awakened Inverse Tohka and Origami's previous self, which both trio compete on a nonchalant date with Shido.
Mukuro was a lonely child who grew up without a family. One day, a couple adopted her along with an older sister, and would live in the warmth that she wanted. The older sister complements her hair while styling it, and they often went stargazing together. However, Mukuro is hurt when her sister had changed from always praising her golden hair and tells her to cut it now while a friend of her sister commented it. Feeling that her family will not adore her as they used to, she gains a newfound power given from Phantom, Mukuro locked the memories of every acquaintance of her family so that they would love only her, but backfires, as her family angrily rebuked her in return, terrified at how she suddenly obtained an unfathomable power. Unable to bear the rejection of a once blissing family, she then sealed her own memories and heart before departing for space. She also deeply loves her long hair and became furious when Inverse Tohka cut it. A fight arises on Tengu Tower's observation deck. Distressed of Mukuro's pure unadulterated love, Shido uses Haniel to forge a duplicate of Michael to unlock her emotions otherwise talking to her is useless. Shido figures out her past and empathized with their childhood abandonment. Afterwards, Mukuro releases the locked memories while referring Shido as her family, and permits that he be the only one she is willing to allow in cutting her hair.
Her Angel is Michael, which takes the form of a large key, which has the ability to lock or unlock abilities or procedures on a large number of different, such as turning off controls of spacecraft, opening and closing wormholes, forcing gravitational pull on meteors and even sealing her own emotions. It has a third ability called release, which releases her and other Spirit's full spiritual power. Her codename is <Zodiac>.

=== Reine Murasame ===
村雨 令音 (Murasame Reine) <Phantom> (ファントム, Fantomu)
Voiced by: Aya Endō (Japanese); Barrett Nash (English) (Seasons 1–3 Season 4 Episode 2 – Present) Emily Ernst (Season 4 Episode 1)
Reine is the analyst onboard the Fraxinus, she is a non-certified medic who can perform simple first aid tasks. On the second day of the semester, she transfers into Shido's school as his assistant homeroom teacher. She is soft spoken, often speaking in a nonchalant manner who seems to have a physically weak stature and always seems to be tired. She even says that she has not slept for 30 years.
It is revealed in Volume 16 that she is the enigmatic entity known as Phantom and Mio's doppelganger. A mysterious entity is who gave humans their Spirit powers. It's heavily implied that Reine is assisting Mio to offer females the Sephira Crystals. This was done by offering them a gem that dissolved into their hands infusing them with the power of a Spirit. Whenever meeting someone Reine always conceals her identity by turning her appearance and voice into 'noise' so while people know she's there and can 'hear' her voice in their minds, nobody can discern or remember what Phantom looked or sounded like (even on camera) so her whole identity, including gender, is hidden. Reine is also the one who told Kurumi about where the "Second Spirit" to show on Earth may be held in along with the information that Shido holds the powers equivalent to three Spirits within him. She stated Origami was the best girl to turn into a Spirit and is surprised that she is rebelling against her.

=== Irregular Spirits ===
These spirits do not appear in the Light Novel and are not part of the series' main canon, only featured in games and films based on it.

==== Rinne Sonogami ====
園神 凜祢 (Sonogami Rinne)
Voiced by: Kana Hanazawa
A character exclusive to the game Date A Live: Rinne Utopia. She's Shido's childhood friend. Her code name is Ruler. Rinne and her family live right beside Shido's house. Their parents have known each other for a long time and because of this, Rinne and Shido naturally grew close together ever since they were children. She often visits the Itsuka residence to wake Shido up in the morning and do house chores for him. She seems to be very close to Kotori and the other spirits as they often have a meal together.
But the truth is, Rinne (or Ruler) was never Shido's childhood friend, nor was she human. She was born as a result of a large amount of spirit energy suddenly forming a consciousness of its own. One day, Shido's massive amount of stress caused by his dangerous life made the powers of the sealed Spirits return to their owners, and on the school's rooftop, Tohka's power went berserk and accidentally killed him. At this moment, Rinne activated the <Eden> in order to save him. Her <Eden> engulfed the entire Tengu City and she slipped into Shido's life as his childhood friend. Her objective was to continue this <Eden> forever and hoped that Shido would never discover the truth and have a happy life with his chosen partner.
Because she can't control <Eden>. In desperation, she concluded that this was the result of her mind turning unstable over time, and so she chose to date Shido to stabilize her mind once again. But, not only it ends in failure, it also caused Shido to start developing feelings for her. As a last resort, she decided to give up pursuing a happy ending in this loop and tried to forcefully reset Eden by killing Shido once again. However, she was stopped by the Spirits and Origami. Eden's memory manipulation was dissolved and Shido destroyed <Eden>'s vital points and guardians with the help of Tohka and the others. Shido faced the <Ruler> who revealed herself to be Rinne and once again tried to kill Shido. She uses <Paradise Lost> to disarm the other Spirits and Origami, but only Shido is able to resist the effects due to his strong will. Finally accepting her defeat, Rinne asked Shido to seal her by kissing her. Rinne kissed him and her power was sealed, putting an end to <Eden> and her utopia, but because Rinne doesn't possess a physical vessel, the loss of her power means the very end of her existence. She tearfully says goodbye to Shido after confessing her love to him. After this, Shido and the others lose all of their memories regarding Rinne and <Eden>.
After the credits, in an unknown space, Rinne is shown talking with herself until Phantom appears before her. Phantom thanks her for her hard work and suggests that she should get a good sleep. Afterwards, Rinne disappears completely. On the "If" scenario unlocked after the ending, Rinne is shown transferring to Shido's school. Shido miraculously remembers Rinne and welcomes her back, to which she replies with "I'm back, Shido.", ending the game with the words "To be continued" rather than "Fin". She is later seen again in the new <Eden> in Rio Reincarnation and In Volume 11, when Shido meets Phantom, she assumes Rinne's form to talk with him in order to hide her real form from him.

==== Maria Arusu ====
或守 鞠亜 (Arusu Maria)
Voiced by: Suzuko Mimori (Japanese); Sarah Roach (English)
A character exclusive to the game Date A Live: Ars Install. She's an Irregular Spirit, as well as the on-board AI of Fraxinus. Her only purpose is to learn the definition of love.
In reality, Maria is the onboard AI of the Ratatoskr airship <Fraxinus>. Specifically, she was providing the dialogue choices when Shido was trying to communicate with Spirits in the past. When Marina, the artificial Spirit created by DEM Industries, broke into <Fraxinus> main computer, the AI trapped Marina together with herself in the virtual reality world with strong protection. To understand and deal with the unknown enemy she's facing, the AI collects traced information about the enemy and takes on Marina's appearance to prevent the former from hacking into the computer systems of <Fraxinus>.
The AI is also locked out of her memories since she's also trapped inside the game. As a result, the AI can't remember anything, except for her purpose. That's why she wants to know about "love" since she's originally an AI created to support Shido in love situations with the Spirits. Throughout the game, Maria observes Shido's interaction with the Spirits and starts to grasp the meaning of "love slowly". She requests a date with Shido just like the other Spirits and seems to develop a liking for him as well. Unknown to her, Marina has used this as an opening and successfully hacks into the main system of <Fraxinus>, charges the main cannon, and prepares to shoot at Tengu City. Shido and the others then head towards the 'Mother Room' where Marina is. Marina makes multiple copies of herself so that the Spirits will fight against them while Shido and Maria go to the Mother Room. In the Mother Room, Marina pretends to befriend Maria and then takes the last 10% of her authority. Marina is then able to transform into her Spirit form. She keeps attacking while Shido uses the Spirits' powers to protect Maria. Maria then prays for power to help Shido and somehow Maria can transform into her Spirit form as well, also getting back some of the authority. Shido then defeats Marina with Maria's help.
When Marina's Astral Dress suddenly goes wild, it causes a problem on the outside as <Fraxinus> is now losing flight power and slowly falling toward Tenguu city. Maria then goes on ahead as she is the only one who can enter the ball. Moments later, the other Spirits arrive and they destroy the ball together. Shido then rushes towards where Maria and Marina are. In the meantime, Maria and Marina share each other's memories and "understand each other."
When Shido arrives, both Maria and Marina wish for Shido to kill them so that <Fraxinus> can fully restart, preventing it from falling towards Tenguu city and killing many people. After much resistance, Shido finally uses <Sandalphon> to break Marina's crystal and thus she dies. He kisses Maria and she disappears as well, after saying she finally understands what "love" is and that she loves Shido. In the True Ending, it is revealed that Marina sent Maria's mail message to Shido's phone (which Maria thought would be unreachable), and even installed Maria onto his phone, preventing her from disappearing completely. In Volume 14, one of the features of the newly repaired Fraxinus EX is that the ship's AI can now speak and interact with its operators using a girl's voice. The A.I. is code-named "MARIA". In volume 19, she pilots Nia's version of Nibelcoles which is made in the image of Maria.

==== Marina Arusu ====
或守 鞠奈 (Arusu Marina)
Voiced by: Suzuko Mimori
A character exclusive to the game Date A Live: Ars Install. She's an Irregular Spirit created by DEM to take control over Fraxinus and the main antagonist of the game.

==== Rio Sonogami ====
園神 凜緒 (Sonogami Rio)
Voiced by: Ayane Sakura
A character exclusive to the game Date A Live: Rio Reincarnation. She's a mysterious young Spirit who is the daughter of Shido and Rinne.

==== Mayuri ====
万由里 (Mayuri)
Voiced by: Sora Amamiya
A character exclusive to the feature film Date A Live: Mayuri Judgement, Mayuri is a Spirit born from energy unconsciously emitted by Tohka, Yoshino, Kotori, Kaguya, Yuzuru, and Miku due to their jealousy over Shido, which gathers into a massive sphere of energy that only Shido himself, and for some reason Kurumi were able to detect. Once knowing the source of the energy, Kotori decides that Shido must have an individual date with each of the girls in order to get them satisfied enough for the sphere to disappear. During the dates, Shido has a few glimpses of Mayuri watching over him, but after she finally makes contact with him, the sphere reveals itself as Mayuri's angel, which traps her. Shido and his friends join forces to defeat the angel and rescue Mayuri, but when she finally kisses him, sealing her powers, Mayuri disappears without a trace, as she lacks a physical body, much to Shido and the others' sadness.
Her Angel is Kerubiel, first manifesting itself as a massive sphere of energy, later converting itself as a massive cage that restrains Mayuri, and ultimately into a lance that fires a massive blast of energy, strong enough to handle the attacks of Shido's six Spirits at once, as it was created from their residual energy combined. It could only be damaged by Tohka after the other spirits shared their energy with her to give her more power. It was only stopped with its energy source cut after Mayuri sealed herself by kissing Shido, even knowing that it would bring an end to her existence as well.

==== Ren ====
蓮 (Ren)
Voiced by: Rie Takahashi
A character exclusive to the game Date A Live: Ren Dystopia.
Born 30 years ago from Phantom hatred but sealed right away by Phantom. She holds a grudge against Phantom for what Phantom did to her, and that's why she makes a wish to her angel Samael to kill Shido or so what she believed until now.

== Ratatoskr ==
Ratatoskr (ラタトスク機関, Ratatosuku Kikan) is an organization created for the purpose of resolving the issues of Spirits and the spatial quakes through peaceful means. Commanded by Kotori Itsuka, it was created for her brother as he has the means to peacefully seal a Spirit's powers. Ratatoskr's command center is located upon their airship known as the Fraxinus, located 15,000 meters (49,000 ft) above Tengu City. The headquarters for Ratatoskr is at an undisclosed location which houses the records for Ratatoskr as well as being the location for high-ranking members of Ratatoskr and the Rounds to operate from.

=== Kyōhei Kannazuki ===
神無月 恭平 (Kannazuki Kyōhei)
Voiced by: Takehito Koyasu (Japanese); J. Michael Tatum (English)
Kyōhei is the vice-commander of Ratatoskr crewing the Fraxinus, a ship located 15,000 meters above Tengu City. He shows masochistic qualities when receiving any type of physical punishment from Kotori. He displays psychological foresight in his defense of the Fraxinus which appears to be an ability known by Kotori to the point that she is dismissive of a physical attack upon the Fraxinus because of his presence. He is also the former captain of the AST, when Ryōko had just joined. Kyōhei kept the AST in line with unusual punishments whenever they stepped out of line; first timers had to cosplay for a day, second timers had to step on him on top of having to cosplay, whatever happened to third timers was so bad that Ryōko went pale thinking about it and refused to say a word about it. However Kyōhei was well-respected due to his skills with the Realizers. He left the AST to "find a suitable master to serve", and joined Ratatoskr, but left a wish to be reinstated in case he wanted to return. While he does have bizarre fetishes, his ability and brain is so great that he is able to do the job of a Command Realizer (which has the combined stress of 7 Realizers which would burn out most wizards,) but command the crew of the Fraxinus in battle, and manipulate the Yggdfolium onto an enemy ship to act as a mine doing all three simultaneously. Although he still pales in comparison to Ellen's abilities considering how well she fought, especially considering the enormous power and stress of the special CR-unit, Goetia, she skillfully flew.

=== Kyoji Kawagoe ===
川越 恭次 (Kyōji Kawagoe), "Bad Marriage"
Voiced by: Gō Inoue (Japanese); Christopher Sabat (English)
Married and divorced five times, Kyoji has been given the title "Master of Love". One of several male assistants to Shido by giving a vote on the appropriate course of action Shido should take when acting.

=== Masaomi Mikimoto ===
幹本 雅臣 (Mikimoto Masaomi), "Boss"
Voiced by: Kentarō Tone (Japanese); Bradley Campbell (English)
Masaomi is an incubus during the nighttime. One of several male assistants to Shido onboard the Fraxinus. His introductory phrase, Mahal kita is Filipino for I love you.

=== Hinako Shiizaki ===
椎崎 雛子 (Shiizaki Hinako), "The Nail Knocker"
Voiced by: Satomi Akesaka (Japanese); Maeghan Albach (English)
Described as "bringing pain to every rival of her love" and "the woman who lives at 2am", Hinako is introduced with a voodoo doll. One of several female assistants to Shido onboard the Fraxinus.

=== Munechika Nakatsugawa ===
中津川 宗近 (Nakatsugawa Munechika), "The Dimension Breaker"
Voiced by: Gorgeous (Japanese); Matt Thurston (English)
Munechika is a man with a hundred wives. One of several male assistants to Shido onboard the Fraxinus.

=== Kozue Minowa ===
箕輪 梢 (Minowa Kozue), "Deep Love"
Voiced by: Tomoko Usami (Japanese); Sara Ragsdale (English)
Kozue is a woman whose sincere and earnest devotion was feared by the government. One of several female assistants to Shido onboard the Fraxinus.

=== Elliott Baldwin Woodman ===
エリオット・ボールドウィン・ウッドマン (Eriotto Bōrudowin Uddoman)
Voiced by: Jōji Nakata (Japanese); Ed Blaylock (Season 2), John Swasey (Season 3–4) (English)
Elliott is an elderly man of higher than 50 years of age who is Ratatoskr's Machinery's founder as well as Kotori's benefactor. He is described as good natured and is the chairman of the Rounds. He seems blind since as all of the books within his library are written in Braille, yet after meeting Tohka in person he said "She really looked happy" rather than she sounded or she seemed happy. He receives respect from Kotori to the point that she wears her military uniform properly without her signature Chupa Chups lollipops. Seemingly, Elliott possesses authority over Kotori to the point in that being suggestive of appropriate action to take should the worse case happen after Shido manifested an Angel, Kotori replied that she would kill Shido. His secretary is Karen Nora Mathers, Ellen Mathers' (aka Adeptus 1 of DEM) younger sister.
In the past, Woodman founded DEM together with Westcott and Ellen. They summoned the First Spirit in the world, and unintentionally caused the first spatial quake to occur. However, Woodman claims that he adores Mio at first sight; realizing Westcott's disillusion goal causing Woodman to abandon DEM and formed Ratatoskr. At first, he was unwilling to resort to using Shido's power to seal the Spirits' mana inside his body for his goals, believing nothing good will come out of storing all that power in a single person. Yet, he was unsuccessful and theorized that a Sephira Crystal can only be extracted if all currently known Spirits have their mana stored into a single individual. Eventually, he was forced to use him as there was no other solution found.

== AST (Anti-Spirit Team) ==
The Anti-Spirit Team is a special unit within the Japan Ground Self-Defense Force that is designed to suppress and kill the threat posed by Spirits. They utilize Combat Realizer units (CR Units) layered on top of combat wiring suits to enhance normal human capabilities while providing offensive and defensive combat capabilities. The CR Units are based upon equipment that utilizes technology recovered by humans after the original spatial quake that have been described as "magic through science". The CR Units of the AST have an operating area otherwise known as the operator's "personal territory" that can be expanded or contracted at the will of the operator, thus leading to a decrease or an increase in the territory's effective capability. In this personal territory, the impossible can occur thus leading to the description of "magic through science".

=== Ryōko Kusakabe ===
日下部 燎子 (Kusakabe Ryōko)
Voiced by: Ao Takahashi (Japanese); Caitlin Glass (English)
Ryōko is of the Japan Ground Self Defense Force's Anti-Spirit Team who leads the young girls of the AST while being 27 herself.

=== Mana Takamiya ===
崇宮 真那 (Takamiya Mana)
Voiced by: Misato (Japanese); Felecia Angelle (English)
A temporary Second Lieutenant of the AST, Mana works for the DEM Industries based out of England as a Wizard. Revealed to be the biological sister of Shido, she is unable to remember her time with Shido but possesses just a picture which was her only proof that she had a brother. As with Shido, she has blue hair and brown eyes, with her blue hair tied in a ponytail. She reunites with her brother who is shocked to meet her while she forms a rivalry with Kotori. Due to the procedure she underwent to strengthen her fighting power, she has less than 10 years to live, but was kept from knowing this truth about her body. After being defeated by Kurumi, Mana is hospitalized but is taken away by Ratatoskr in volume 5 whereupon she learns of this truth and defects to the organization in volume 6.
Truth is Mana and her brother Shido Itsuka, named Shinji Takamiya, and lived around 30 years ago. Mana was just an ordinary middle-school student living with Shinji, until one day, he brought over a half-naked girl, whom he named Mio, immediately surprising her. Soon Mio began staying with them as a relative of the family, and Mana taught her how to integrate herself with society. However, at some point, DEM abducted Mana. In DEM's captivity, it is theorized that they used complete experiments on Mana, granting her talented skills as a <Wizard> at the cost of halting her physical aging. Her memories were concealed for her incorporated into their organization.

=== Mikie Okamine ===
岡峰 美紀恵 (Okamine Mikie)
Voiced by: Kanami Satō (Japanese); Sarah Wiedenheft (English)
Holding the rank of Private, Mikie is described as having brown eyes and hair, with her hair tied in pigtails. She is in Origami's and Shido's year but she skipped a grade, making her one year younger. Her age being close to Origami's leads her to have a strange attraction to Origami. Her dedication to Origami is shown by the fact that she was willing to resign from the AST when she thought Origami was going to have a disciplinary discharge.
She is also the protagonist of Date AST Like along with Origami.

=== Mildred F. Fujimura ===
ミルドレッド・F・藤村 (Mirudoreddo Efu Fujimura)
Voiced by: Saki Ogasawara (Japanese); Kristin Sutton (English)
Holding the rank of Sergeant First Class, Mildred is described as a girl with blue eyes and blonde hair who wears glasses. She often goes by the nickname "Mily". Her age is close to Origami's thus leading her to have a strange attraction to Origami. She is a mechanic who occasionally gets delusional about others for her own personal fantasy.

== DEM Industries ==
One of the largest corporations in the world, it is based out of Britain having originated out of a defense industry and it is the only known industry that is able to manufacture Realizer Units. The Realizer units equipped by the world's military, police forces, and especially the AST are all made by DEM Industries. They are economic rivals with Asgard Electronics, the company that supports Ratatoskr, with operatives who are able to utilize CR Units with experience exceeding that of special forces groups from different countries. The "DEM" within their name stands for Deus Ex Machina. They're marginally inferior to Ratatoskr in the development of aspects related to Realizer units due to advancing in various fields and oppose their policy of protecting and sheltering the Spirits, as according to them the only way to deal with the Spirits is by destroying them. As long as their goals are realized, killing hundreds of people in the process is an acceptable loss and not worth losing sleep over.

=== Sir Isaac Ray Pelham Westcott ===
サー・アイザック・レイ・ペラム・ウェストコット (Aizakku Rei Peramu Wesutokotto)
Voiced by: Ryōtarō Okiayu (Japanese); Alex Organ (Season 2) (English) Christopher Wehkamp (Seasons 3–Present)

The main antagonist of Date A Live, who is the founder and managing director of Deus Ex Machina Industries (DEM), the world's largest military megacorporation. Though physically appearing to be a man in his early thirties, Westcott possesses knowledge far beyond that of any ordinary human, displaying intimate awareness of Tohka Yatogami's Inverse state, the true origins of the Spirits, and even Shido Itsuka's forgotten past. Revered almost as a deity within DEM, every elite Wizard addresses him with the honorific "-sama", demonstrating absolute loyalty and a willingness to commit any atrocity at his command.

Beneath the façade of a refined and charismatic businessman lies a man almost entirely devoid of empathy or conventional morality. Westcott treats torture, genocide, and mass casualties with the same detached indifference one would discuss routine business, showing no remorse regardless of whether the victims are civilians, loyal subordinates, or lifelong companions. He calmly devised methods to psychologically break Tohka through prolonged torture, welcomed the destruction caused by her Inversion as a successful experiment, and viewed the deaths of his own soldiers and the loss of DEM's assets as inconsequential so long as they advanced his objectives. Despite his composed demeanor and gentlemanly manners, nearly everyone who encounters him remarks upon the overwhelming sense of dread surrounding him, describing his presence as suffocating, inhuman, and profoundly unsettling.

Westcott was born into a secluded community of magi alongside his childhood friends Elliot Baldwin Woodman, Karen Nora Mathers, and Ellen Mira Mathers. Their peaceful lives came to a brutal end when human extremists, fearing the existence of magic, massacred the village and exterminated nearly its entire population. While the tragedy filled the other survivors with grief and a desire to protect others, it awakened something far darker within Westcott, becoming the catalyst for the ambitions that would shape the rest of his life. Determined to surpass the limitations of both humanity and magic, he and his companions devoted themselves to researching sorcery, eventually laying the foundations for the creation of Spirits—beings born from the world's mana whose power they believed could reshape reality itself.

Following the massacre, Westcott was adopted by a wealthy British aristocratic family. Years later, after his adoptive parents died under "suspicious" circumstances, he inherited their immense fortune, using it as the financial foundation to establish DEM Industries. Although he initially claimed to seek a utopia where magi could live free from persecution, this ideal gradually gave way to a far more horrifying ambition: to remake reality into a world consumed by endless suffering, despair, and conflict, where he alone could indulge in the greatest pleasure he had ever known—the agony of others.

=== Ellen Mira Mathers ===
エレン・ミラ・メイザース (Eren Mira Meizāsu)
Voiced by: Shizuka Itō (Japanese); Trina Nishimura (English)
Known as the world's strongest Wizard who works under Westcott as his secretary. She had previously worked for the AST at his request. She has vowed to never lose to any opponent, even agreeing that she may go so far as to commit the atrocity of destroying the world in the process. She is also Karen Nora Mathers' older sister. Whether Ellen's fanatical devotion to Westcott is sincere or imprinted on her is unknown, but was willing to cut off the hands of DEM board members who had voted against him. Also wants to kill Woodman for what she considers his betrayal. Like Westcott, she does not care about the lives of others (except for Westcott himself) except for how they can show some use in furthering his objectives. This is shown when she hopes Paddington and the Arbatel were completely destroyed when she loses contact with them rather than considering if she should go help.

=== Russell ===
Voiced by: Seiya Yamanaka (Japanese); Barry Yandell (English)
The Chairman of the DEM Board of Directors, Russell was known to support Westcott so much that he is implied to have been brainwashed. When Murdoch voted to remove Westcott as Managing Director, Russell agreed to allow the vote under Westcott's orders. After Russell counted "Zero Hands" and watched the directors get their arms cut off by Ellen, he silently exited the room without any further questioning.

=== James A. Paddington ===
ジェームズ・A・パディントン (Jēmuzu A. Padinton)
Voiced by: Toshiharu Nakanishi (Japanese); R. Bruce Elliott (English)
Second executive head for Colonel, he is the captain of the DEM Industries' 500 meter airship Arbatel. He is a middle-aged man with a beard. Has an arrogant personality and more concerned with saving his career when things went south rather than his crew's lives or maintaining secrecy. He was also show to be extremely hot-headed, impatient, and reckless, as seen when he got angry over Kannazuki predicting his attacks. While held in captivity after the Island incident by Ratatoskr, Westcott terminated him after using him to communicate with Woodman.

=== Jessica Bailey ===
ジェシカ·ベイリー (Jeshika Beirī)
Voiced by: Yūko Kaida (Japanese); Jennifer Green (English)
Long red haired woman and is the third strongest DEM wizard. Like the other DEM wizards she's concerned with receiving Westcott's favor and completing his orders first, and personal morals a distant second. Jessica was the leader of the DEM wizards sent to the AST after the island incident to "help out" with the authority to act on their own in order to accomplish Westcott's mission of finding and capturing Shido and Tohka at the first opportunity shown. Arrogantly considers herself and the other DEM wizards helping the AST as elites helping out immature amateurs only until they complete their own secret mission. She also is extremely jealous of Ellen and Mana being more powerful and therefore closer to Westcott. After losing to Mana in their first battle Jessica somehow got her powers severely charged up allowing her to use the <Red Licorice>, a combat version of the <White Licorice> test type for their second battle. However, this would burn her out in hours and not years overwhelming her mentality causing her to go berserk. So in her attempts to kill Mana during their second battle Jessica was completely ignoring any damage she dealt to her own comrades and the surrounding area. When Jessica was approaching her limit Mana dealt her a terminal blow, killing her. Her last words were wondering if Westcott would finally notice her.

=== Roger Murdoch ===
ロジャー・マードック (Rojā Mādokku)
Voiced by: Ryūichi Hirose (Japanese); Phil Parsons (English)
A wealthy, unambitious member DEM's board of directors, Murdoch was known to be younger than the other members on the board. He quickly came to realize that his whole purpose in the company was to cover up any illegal activities Westcott would commit, and completely lamented it. After Westcott started a large scale battle in Tengu City which caused tremendous amounts of property damage and killed countless wizard DEM has borrowed from the AST, Murdoch had enough and petitioned a vote to remove Westcott as the Managing Director of the company. Though more than half the other members agreed with him, the vote was called off when Ellen chopped off their hands. After losing his arm, Murdoch's hatred turned murderous, and he even went as far to try and nuke Tengu city (Where Westcott had returned too), in order to get revenge. Despite this, his terrorist attack was repelled by Shido and Rataskor.

=== Simpson ===
Voiced by: Naoki Bandō (Japanese); Brian Mathis (English)
A DEM board member who, like Murdoch, also opposed Westcott due to his lack of care for his own company. Simpson voted to have Westcott removed from the company and lost his arm in the attempt. While Simpson initially dismissed Murdoch's idea of getting payback (As he though going against Westcott again would only cause more trouble), he eventually agreed to help Murdoch, despite being horrified with Murdoch's plan to kill everyone in Tengu City.

=== Artemisia Bell Ashcroft ===
アルテミシア・ベル・アシュクロフト (Arutemishia Beru Ashukurofuto)
Voiced by: Eriko Matsui (Japanese); Lindsay Seidel (English)
Artemisia is one of the top five Wizards in the entire world. She is first mentioned in the 5th volume of Date A Live, where the discussion about Origami's superb ability can be compared to or greater than Mana Takamiya or Artemisia if Origami underwent enhancement surgery. As of the present, she is in a comatose state after DEM had extracted her memories to use as a core program for a new series of CR wiring suits which are named after her: the Ashcroft series. At the end of the final volume, Artemisia was able to recover when the memories from the <Ashcroft> series were transferred back into her.

=== Andrew Kersee Dunstan Francis Barbillori ===
A proud member of Isaac Westcott's elite wizard unit, Andrew was tasked by Ellen with overseeing DEM's Japanese base's defensing during the battle in Tengu City. He would later be killed by Shido and Miku after attempting to stop them from reaching Tohka.

== Raizen High School ==
Raizen High School (来禅高校, Raizen Kōkō) is a high school located in Tenguu City within the Kantou region where Shido and other major characters attend. Having been built on the disaster area that affected Japan from the spatial quake thirty years ago, the school is installed with an underground bunker for whenever there is a spatial quake in the area.

=== Hiroto Tonomachi ===
Hiroto Tonomachi (殿町 宏人, Tonomachi Hiroto)
Voiced by: Anri Katsu (Japanese); Nick Haley (seasons 1–2) (English)
Shido's classmate. In the anime, he has a 2D girlfriend who is actually a character from "Fall in Love: My Little Seed" (恋して マイ・リトル・シード, Koishite Mai Ritoru Siido), Date A Live's in-universe visual novel.

=== Tamae Okamine ===
Tamae Okamine (岡峰 珠恵, Okamine Tamae)
Voiced by: Kaori Sadohara (Japanese); Anastasia Muñoz (English)
Homeroom teacher for Shido's class, she is called Tama-chan by her students. As she is 29 years old and still single, she is very anxious to get married.

=== The Trio ===
Ai Yamabuki (山吹 亜衣, Yamabuki Ai), Mai Hazakura (葉桜 麻衣, Hazakura Mai), & Mii Fujibakama (藤袴 美衣, Fujibakama Mii)
Voiced by: Risako Murai, Kayoko Tsumita, & Midori Tsukimiya (Japanese); Jamie Marchi, Leah Clark, & Monica Rial (English)
Shido's classmates. They always seen together and are friends with Tohka, supporting her in her efforts to become Shido's girlfriend, while reprimanding him upon seeing him with other girls. Their given name is a pun for I, My, and Me.
