= MapleStory (TV series) =

Japanese anime television series

- Cover of the first volume of the DVD release, featuring Al and Kino

メイプルストーリー (Meipuru Sutōrī)
- Genre: Adventure; Fantasy
- Anime television series
- Directed by: Takaaki Ishiyama
- Written by: Toshiki Inoue
- Music by: Satoshi Togawa
- Studio: Madhouse
- Original network: TXN (TV Tokyo)
- Original run: October 7, 2007 – March 30, 2008
- Episodes: 26

MapleStory (Japanese: メイプルストーリー, Hepburn: Meipuru Sutōrī) is a Japanese anime television series. Based on the South Korean video game MapleStory, it was produced by Madhouse and directed by Takaaki Ishiyama. It aired on TV Tokyo from October 2007 to March 2008 for 25 episodes, with a 26th episode being released on DVD.

== Synopsis ==
Ten years ago, the World Tree that protected peace and order of the world was being targeted by an evil organization called the Black Wings. The human race led five other races: the powerful warriors, the intelligent magicians, the agile archers, sly thieves and soon after pirates in a fight against the Black Wings. In the end, the World Tree activated self-destruction to protect itself. However, the other races thought it was the human race that destroyed the World Tree. When the World Tree was destroyed most of the races had nothing left, so a number of them went to Maple Island, thinking the ones who stayed would die. They escaped Victoria and lived on Maple Island where living was getting harder and harder. Since then, a never-ending war between the different races began.

Ten years later, Al is determined to revive the World Tree. Al and his companions begin their journey to seek the seeds of the World Tree. At the same time, the Black Wings reappear to get the seed first to rule the entire world.

== Characters ==
Al
Voiced by: Houko Kuwashima
He is the son of the warrior Grande. He dresses up like a monster because humans are considered enemies to other races, but his true identity was finally revealed to everyone at the end of fourth episode. He likes doing random training and is mainly seen carrying a heavy stone behind him. He is known for his never give-up spirit and always-trying attitude and is quite stubborn at times. He is very determined and will do what is best for his family and friends, even going soforth to help his enemies. Nina and Anji consider Al "gullible", as both of them lied to him or tricked him with ease. His main weapon of choice seems to be the wooden sword that he carries on his back, but later arms himself with Grande's Hero's Gladius, a blade that holds a hidden power of light and purification that only Grande and Al can channel. Occasionally, he will try to ask either Barrow or Gallus to accept him as a student, but is unable to defeat their disciple, or at least the master himself. Nonetheless, both Barrow and Gallus see Al as an "interesting" character.
Kino
Voiced by: Yūko Minaguchi
Based on the in-game monster Orange Mushroom and has a fondness for Al. He loves to collect shiny stones, but the stones were once mistaken for a World Tree Seed and was thus chased by the Warriors of Seron Perion and the Archers of Seron Henesys. He collects those stones to make a present for his mother. He has a cousin, Kiki, a Blue Mushroom who lives on Victoria Island.
Barrow
Voiced by: Hidenobu Kiuchi
He is the leader of Seron Henesys (Archers) on Maple Island. He fought alongside Al's father, Grande. His character slightly resembles the in-game monsters Meerkat and Lycanthrope. Barrow is equipped with a Maple Soul Searcher. His students mainly include Drumming Bunnies, Fairies, and Turkeys.
Gallus
Voiced by: Taiten Kusunoki
The leader of the Seron Perion (Warriors) on Maple Island. His character is based on by the in-game monster Muscle Stone. Gallus is equipped with a Maple Dragon Axe, but often prefers to fight with his fists. His students mainly include Yellow King Goblins, Wooden Masks, and Rocky Masks.
Nina
Voiced by: Aya Endō
The strongest magician in the magician village Seron Ellinia. She is also the village chief, but somewhat conceited. In the third episode, she becomes the second monster to discover Al's identity as a human (the first being Pūdō, her Ribbon Pig pet). Nina seems to be reluctant when she meets him but grows to accept him as a friend and to enjoy his company. In the fifth episode, when Anji ran back into Seron Kerning after lying and tricking Al, she stopped him and said that she is the only one who could pull pranks on Al. Also then, Pūdō said that a female's jealousy is strong. At the end of the episode she was behind a rock and Pūdō said that she should just admit that she cannot stand to have her only friend (Al) taken away from someone else and she kicked him, saying that he is not her friend. Her weapon of choice seems to be a maple wand.
Pūdō
Voiced by: Rica Matsumoto
Nina's pet based on the in-game monster Ribbon Pig. Often bumps into Al while trying to run away from Nina. Pūdō was able to sniffle out Al's true identity as a human, therefore making him the first monster to know Al's secret.
Anji
Voiced by: Takeshi Kusao
The leader of the Seron Kerning (Thieves) on Maple Island based on the in-game monster Wild Kargo. He somehow has a connection with Al's father, Grande, as he brought back his Hero's Gladius to Al's mother during the ten years. Anji is considered sly and cunning.
Ariba
Voiced by: Daisuke Namikawa
He is a member of the Zakums and works for Krone. His character is based on the in-game monster Samiho. Ariba is persistent, constantly chasing Al and his friends assuming they have a World Tree Seed, or at least causing them trouble for the sake of the Zakums.
Krone
Voiced by: Nana Mizuki
Ariba works for him. Not much is known about her up to this point. She is constantly trying to find items, including snails, to keep her face soft and moist. She also becomes very angry when she learns that someone is on a date and she is not. Her character is based on the monster Lucinda.

== Production ==
The anime is based on the South Korean video game MapleStory. It is produced by Madhouse and directed by Takaaki Ishiyama, with Toshiki Inoue writing the scripts, Yoshinori Kanemori designing the characters, and Satoshi Togawa composing the music. The anime's opening theme is "Scratch on the Heart" performed by Younha, while the ending theme is "Kokoro no Kagayaki" (心の輝き; lit. 'Radiance of the Heart') performed by Fumiko Orikasa.

=== Release ===
The anime aired 25 episodes on TV Tokyo and its affiliate stations between October 7, 2007, and March 30, 2008. Its episodes were later released into nine DVD volumes. A 26th episode that was not aired on television was included with the ninth volume.

In South Korea, the anime was aired on SBS TV from April to June 2008. In Singapore, it was aired on Hello! Japan in Japanese with English subtitles in 2014.

=== Episodes ===
No.	Title	Original release date
1	"Al and His Wonderful Companions" "Al to Suteki na Nakamatachi!" (アルとすてきな仲間たち!)	October 7, 2007
2	"Al and Nina" "Aru to Niina" (アルとニーナ)	October 14, 2007
3	"Friendship Is a Good Thing" "Tomodachitte Ī Mon Daze" (友達っていいもんだぜ)	October 21, 2007
4	"Al's True Colors!" "Aru no Shōtai!" (アルの正体!)	October 28, 2007
5	"We're All Friends!" "Minna Nakama Daze!" (みんな仲間だぜ!)	November 4, 2007
6	"Stolen Heart" "Musumareta Hāto" (盗まれたハート)	November 11, 2007
7	"Mom's a Big Thief" "Kaa-san wa oo Dorobō" (母さんは大どろぼう)	November 18, 2007
8	"Clash! Gallus VS Barrow VS Super Al" "Gekitotsu! Garusu VS Baroo VS Chōjin Aru" (激突!ガルスVSバローVS超人アル)	November 25, 2007
9	"Rain, Rain, Damp and Sticky Pandemonium" "Ame Ame Jime Jime Daikonran" (雨あめジメジメ大混乱)	December 2, 2007
It is continuously raining and mildew grows everywhere, but the rain is actually caused by a rain machine created by Ariba, by Krone's orders. Everyone blames each other for the mildew's origin, so Al must save the day.
10	"We're Off!" "Tabidachi!" (旅立ち!)	December 9, 2007
Al saves a girl named Maron, who has barely escaped from Victoria island. She claims that Zakteman and Zakums are attacking Victoria island searching for the World Tree's seeds. Al gathers Barrow, Gallus and Anji in hopes of going to Victoria island to save it and revive the World Tree using the seeds. They suddenly learn that Al is Grande's son and refuse to go to Victoria island, as they do not trust Al, since he is a human. Even Nina refuses. Al decides to go alone and his mother gives him Grande's sword. On the other hand, Maron asks Barrow, Gallus and Anji to lend their power to Al and believe in him and mysteriously disappears.
11	"Gill Appears!" "Giru Arawaru!" (ギル現る!)	December 16, 2007
Al and the gang are slowly approaching Victoria island by ship, when they are suddenly attacked by a human. They make a hurried landing, but Anji and Nina split up right away, and Barrow and Gallus are fighting on who the leader is. Al gets separated when a little monster asks for his help to save a friend. He meets the human from earlier there, who calls himself Gill the Monster Slayer. He asks the little monster about the World Tree seeds, to which the little monster says that he saw a Yeti. Gills asks the little monster to take him to the Yeti, but not finding it, tried to kill the little monsters. Al tries to save them, but gets trapped by Gill's move and is finally saved by Yeti. Barrow, Gallus and Nina arrive to help him and find that the Yeti has already rescued and healed him. Gill finds them and refuses to join the gang when Al invites him. They finally figure out that the Yeti has already planted the seed, but it turns out to be a completely different plant. Finally, we see the little monsters calling the gang as the Legendary Heroes.
12	"Spluna and Alo-Alo" "Supiruna to Aroaro" (スピルナとアロアロ)	December 23, 2007
The gang is split up again and Al, Nina and Pūdō end up at a ghost village, where they meet Spluna, a fortune teller. She has already misled Barrow, Gallus and Anji. But she tells them that their group is not good since Al is still inexperienced. She tells them they need a calm and composed leader and also that they will meet a noble man on a unique horse; they later meet Alo-Alo. Meanwhile, Barrow, Gallus and Anji are out, and Barrow tells them that the old woman was probably a Zakum and she and her son Alo-Alo and also the horse are not to be trusted. As if to prove this, Nina and Al find that it has escaped that night to deliver a letter to Spluna and some Zakums. In the morning, the horse returns and they move ahead and come across Kiki, and Pūdō claims that the horse has been there. Alo-Alo escapes with the horse, and following him leads to Spluna and the Zakums, who capture them and send them to a maze, which no one has been able to get out of except Alo-Alo, who rescues them on the condition that they allow him to be their companion.
13	"Looking for Alo-Alo" "Aroaro o Sagase" (アロアロを探せ)	January 6, 2008
After a fight with Nina, who is not able to accept Alo-Alo as her companion, Alo-Alo runs away with Al and splits up with Nina. Alo-Alo tells Al that he was also saved by Grande in the past in a nearby village. Al wants to go to the village and takes Alo-Alo's horse, leaving him. Nina goes in search of Al, and finding Alo-Alo, forces him to tell the truth and later finds Al in a nearby village. She finds out that Alo-Alo lied to Al so that he would go on a journey with him. When they are coming back, they meet Spluna, who asks them to help her find Alo-Alo within three days, so that their punishment for leaving Zakum is reduced. While Nina and Al initially refuse, Al is unable to leave her alone. They finally find out where Alo-Alo and persuade him to return to the Zakums.
14	"Light of the Sword Again!" "Hikari no Seiken Futatabi!" (光の聖剣再び!)	January 13, 2008
Nina and Al reunite with Barrow, Gallus and Anji, but Anji leaves again and the rest depart to Barrow's village, Henesys. On the way, they save a monster from the village, called Sero who is attacked by Gill. When they all arrive at the village, they see that it was attacked by the Zakums who were searching for the World Tree's seed. They also meet a bard called Jonah, who can heal the soul by playing his harp and Nina seems to know him. They halt at Sero's house, when they hear that monsters are getting attacked and their energy is getting stolen. That night, Barrow finds Jonah acting suspiciously and that there is a monster who was attacked and energy stolen from. The village is attacked again, this time it is Gill, who blames Jonah for stealing the energy from all the monsters. Jonah confesses that he did this to return peace to the world. The shows a ring which sucks energy from the monsters and which has told Jonah that it can save the world. Jonah runs away after sucking energy from Barrow and Sero, but what comes out of the ring is a monster called Triple Pteras. The monster confesses that it tricked Jonah. When no one is able to defeat the monster, and it also breaks Al's sword, everyone asks Al to bear Grande's sword. Al finally defeats the monster using Grande's sword. They finally head out to Nina's village, Ellinia.
15	"Auction of the World Tree's Seed!" "Seikai Kino Tane no Ōkushon" (世界樹の種のオークション)	January 20, 2008
Nina refuses to go to Ellinia. Al, Barrow and Gallus go there to find Ariba attacking the village. They meet Zuka, who is also protecting the village. He has the World Tree seed, but he is actually auctioning the seed. Everyone tries their best to get something to use at the auction to get the World Tree seed, even Anji returns. As Nina still refuses to go to the village, Anji says Zuka must be her ex-boyfriend. In the auction, Ariba has the highest bid, but Al offers his and his companions' help to protect the village when Zakums attack. Ariba tries to steal the World Tree seed, and takes Zuka hostage, but Nina saves him. Ariba retaliates by burning a tree and Nina returns again to help. Anji asks Zuka to give them the World Tree seed, but he refuses saying he cannot give it to Nina's friends.
16	"Nina's Homeland" "Niina no Furusato" (ニーナのふるさと)	January 27, 2008
Even when everyone asks her, Nina refuses to tell them the truth. Al still goes after Nina to find out the truth and Nina tells him that when Nina left Ellinia, she left Zuka behind saying he will be a bother to her. Shocked by those words, Zuka shouts that Nina should never return. Al and the rest come up with a plan so that Zuka and Nina meet, but they fight again when they meet. When everyone asks him, Zuka says that he is angry with her since Nina refused to help and left when the village was under attack from the Zakums. Then he overhears the other monsters apologizing to Nina and questions them. They tell him that Nina had actually fought till the end while they had fled. Meanwhile, Krone decides to attack the village. Nina and Zuka together defend the village. Nina gives her wand to Zuka, who has been holding it all this time and he gives her the Wold Tree seed. As everyone plants the seed, Maron appears and tells them that the seed is fake, and she believes that they can find the real one.
17	"The Strongest Warrior (Part 1)" "Saikyō no Senshi (Zenhen)" (最強の戦士(前編))	February 3, 2008
Nina sends an update letter to Al's mom. They are heading to Gallus's hometown, Perion. They save a monster called Ion from Zakums, who tells them that one of Zakteman's generals attacked them, took over the village and is forcing everyone to carve Zakteman's face at the village entrance. Gallus defeats all the Zakums in his anger but when he challenges the general, Gallus is shocked since the general is Godfried. Godfried who was his superior and supposed successor to Chief Kahn of the Perion village, but he left the village since he was not chosen. Godfried tells him that there cannot be a world without war and that the strong will always rule the weal. When they fight, Godfried uses Stance, to block all the enemy moves and Rush to attack Gallus. Al blocks Godfried as he tries to save Gallus, but he is also thrown away. Gill saves him and everyone escapes with the help of Ion and Anji. Although Gill fights more, he also escapes when even his Dragon slasher does not work. Al and the group go searching for Kahn to get an idea as to how to defeat Godfried. He tells Gallus to go to the temple in the Ancient City ruins and get the holy weapon from the Legend of Gigal to increase his power, but this is a test for Gallus, to see if he wants only power too, just like Godfried.
18	"The Strongest Warrior (Part 2)" "Saikyō no Senshi (Kōhen)" (最強の戦士(後編))	February 10, 2008
At the ruin's entrance, when Godfried attacks them, Nina and Barrow stay back for defense, and Anji, Pūdō and Al go together with Gallus to find the weapon. Godfried uses Power Guard to defend against Nina's attacks. Gill joins the fray. Gallus and the party reach the weapon, but there are stone statues guarding the weapon and he is unable to take it. Anji steals it while Gallus is fighting the guards and another statue comes alive. As Gallus takes the weapon, the stone lion tells Gallus that he can take the Dragon Platon but his friend's lives will be taken. Gallus drops the weapon, saying he has learnt the true meaning of fighting now. The stone lion tells him that he now deserves the weapon and transforms into the weapon in Gallus's hands. Gallus returns and tells Gill that he will fight Godfried. They go to the Pirion arena to fight. Even though he shows tremendous power, he is hurt when he throws away the weapon to save his friends. As everyone thanks him, Gallus finds true power and retrievs the Legendary Weapon again to defeat Godfried. Anji leaves saying he has to train more. Gallus leaves the weapon with Ion to protect the village. Kahn tells the group to head toward Anji's village, since he feels that the World Tree's seed might be that way.
19	"The Proud Thief, Anji!" "Hokori Takaki Hōzoku Anji!" (誇り高き盗賊アンジ!)	February 17, 2008
As they head to Kerning City, hometown of Thieves, Pūdō tells them that it has been overtaken by Zakums, who are searching for the World Tree's seed. Al finds a way through the sewers and Pūdō leads them in the city center. They fall into a trap laid out by Zakums but find out it was actually Anji who laid out the trap. Al manages to get them out and they escape. The others do not trust Anji, but all still refutes saying Anji was the one who returned Grande's sword 10 years ago. Anji again surrounds them and steals their weapons. Gallus and Barrow get caught by the robot again, Al surrenders and everyone gets jailed. As Al sleeps, Grande appears in his dream and tells him to believe in his friends till the end. When Al wakes up, Anji tells them they are going to disappear. But when they are about to be killed Anji saves them and returns their weapons. Anji tells them that this is the best time to attack the city, and they again return. While coming through the sewer, Grande appears in front of Anji and tells him to protect Al. Once in the city, Anji tells them that its time they knew the truth about how Grande fought.
20	"The Truth of Ten Years Ago" "Jūnen Mae no Shinjitsu!" (10年前の真実!)	February 24, 2008
Anji tells him about the past: as everyone is fighting the Zakums, Anji tells them to surrender, since everyone knows that Zakteman is stronger than all. They also find out that all the weapons are gone. As everyone still continues to fight, seeing Zakeman approaching, Grande goes towards him. Anji was the one who stole the weapons and brought Zakteman to the World Tree and betrayed his friends, trusting Zakteman to not harm his friends. As Zakteman tries to hurt him, Grande arrives to save him, and tells him that it is important to trust, but also to know whom to trust. As Grande blocks Zakteman's attack, his sword, which is made from the World tree, shines brilliantly, just as the World Tree explodes to protect itself. When Anji regains consciousness, the World Tree is gone, and Grande is gone. He finds Grande's sword and returns it hoping that a great warrior would appear some day. Coming to the present, they see the Golem destroying the city. Anji is confused, since the Golem used to be the protector of the forest. Since the Golem is not affected by any of their attacks, Al suggests that they take away the bad memories from the Golem and return it to be the protector of the forest. They also receive help from Gill, who was listening to Anji's story and they are able to save the Golem.
21	"Letter from My Father" "Tōsan Karano Tegami" (父さんからの手紙)	March 2, 2008
The gang reach the forest where they can see the remains of the World Tree. They decide to go there. Nina flies ahead, but the rest have to go through a tricky swamp. Barrow, Gallus and Anji get stuck in quicksand and Al goes in search of Nina to get help. Ariba and the Zakums arrive and attack them. Meanwhile, Nina and Pūdō are lost, but they are found by some Junior Yetis who take them to the Yeti. Al gets struck by a tree and drowns, and starts dreaming of when he was a baby, when his mom and dad clothed him and when Zaktuman attacked and Grande blocked the attack and fell. He also sees the Yeti save him and Grande tells him that he is fine and Al should wait for him. Yeti also saves him. Al returns with Nina to his friends to save them from the swamp and from Ariba with help from Yeti and his friends. Yeti then shows them the path out of the swamp, and gives Al his father's handkerchief that he saw in his dream.
22	"Al and Gill, An Exchange of Swords" "Giru to Aru, Futarino Tsurugi" (ギルとアル、ふたりの剣)	March 9, 2008
The gang is still lost in the forest, even after getting out of the swamp. Al gets separated from the rest of the gang when he saves a monster. He meets Gill, who is following another monster, named Lupin, to know where Yeti are. Al tells Gill he knows where the Yeti are, and that if he trusts him, Al should give him his sword. When Al exchanges swords while asking Gill not to hurt anyone with it, he takes the sword and disappears. Meanwhile, Anji tells the gang that he saw Grande in city and Gallus tells them its possible that Grande is alive. As Al searches for Gill, he is reunited with the rest of the gang. They see that Gill's sword is heavily used and say that he must be well trained. As they begin to say that Gill is not to be trusted, Al tells them about the dream from the time with the Yeti, hearing which, everyone begins searching for Gill. Meanwhile, Gill is attacked by the Ariba who turns Zakums and the nice monsters from before into undefeatable zombies by using a symbol on them. Al and the gang arrive to help him. Gill then tells them that his village was attacked similarly when he was a kid and he decided then that he will make the monsters pay. Al tries to stop him as he fights with Grande's sword, telling him that the monsters are being controlled, but Gill is unable to use the power of the sword. Al takes the sword from him and destroys the symbols controlling the monsters. As Ariba runs away with the Zakums, Gill is also nowhere to be seen. Al and the gang then see the World Tree seeds glowing. The forest's monsters tell them that the seeds are moving towards the World Tree and while the weak seeds would not make it, only one seed will become the World Tree.
23	"World Tree Seed" "Sekaiju no Tane" (世界樹の種)	March 16, 2008
The group nears Sleepy Wood and see that the seeds are returning. They start collecting the seeds when they hear from Pūdō that the Zakums are coming with Krone, Ariba, Godfried and Alo-Alo. The Zakums see that when they try to collect the seeds, they die, but Al and his friends are able to collect them without any problems. They attack Al and friends to take the seeds from them. Meanwhile, Al is sad that the seeds are dying and Maron appears; she tells him that long ago all the monsters were fighting one another due to greed and the Great One dropped the seed of the World Tree so that it can bring peace to the world. That is why when bad people touch it, the seed's powers are gone and they die, but when good people touch it, they thrive. She tells him that the seeds are returning to Sleepy Wood since Al and his friends have come there wishing for peace. She asks him to save the seeds in the same way. The Zakums capture the others and demand the seeds from Al and Alo-Alo asks him to collect all the seeds. Meanwhile, Gill is destroying the seeds since he does not want monsters to get them. He meets Al and tries to grab the seeds but they all die in his hands. Al returns and frees his friends, and when they fight the Zakums, the bag begins to glow with a tremendous light and all the seeds combine into one big seed. Gill arrives and when he takes the seed, the power of the seed goes through him and his Dragon Slasher attack which throws. Gill takes the seed and goes away. Grande appears and tells him that Gill is having a change of heart and asks Al to come to the World Tree.
24	"This Is Real Strength!" "Hontō no Tsuyosa!" (本当の強さ!)	March 23, 2008
Al and his friends get nearer and nearer to the World Tree. Meanwhile, Zakteman is angry that the World Tree seed is still not in his hands. When Krone asks him, he tells her that once he gets the seed, he will plunge the world into eternal darkness and chaos. Krone has second thoughts about being in darkness. On Maron's warning, Al and friends reach Gill just in time, as he is trying to destroy the seeds. Maron and Grande tell Al that Gill is actually good inside. Gill tells them that he feels that the World Tree brings war. Although Al agrees, he says that its not what the World Tree wants. Mother Earth and the World Tree both want peace. Suddenly, Alo-Alo comes out and sprays some kind of poison, which Nina blocks, and runs away with the World Tree seed. Nina's eyes are affected, and while everyone follows Alo-Alo, Gill and Maron stay back with Nina. When Godfried tries taking the World Tree seed from Alo-Alo, he is turned to stone by Zakteman, who says that Godfried is a traitor and that he does not need anyone anymore. He takes the seed and disappears. Gallus, Barrow and Anji follow him and run ahead. They ask Al to follow quickly, saying they will wait under the World Tree. Alo-Alo gives his horse to Al so he can move quickly. The Yetis all arrive and heal Nina. She sees a sleeping Grande, who tells her that he can project only his thoughts since he is not fully healed. He asks Nina that they should all project their thoughts together and fight and that he will meet Al under the World Tree. Everyone arrives at the World Tree and as they all fight Zakteman, they are joined by Krone, Ariba and Gill. Zektaman fills the World Tree seed with his anger and tries to turn it into Dark World Tree. Grande blocks his attack and he and Al get inside the World Tree seed.
25	"Under the World Tree" "Sekaiju no Shita De" (世界樹の下で)	March 30, 2008
Maron tells them that Al and Grande are inside the World Tree seed only because they want to be there. She is disappearing since she is a fairy born from the loving energy of the World Tree, and now that the World Tree is full of dark, she is fading. Everyone realizes that Al is trying to read Zakteman's mind. Al feels that Zakteman's mind is full pain and hatred, and he says that Zakteman does not need to feel all that. The darkness starts becoming bigger. Even Maple island is turning dark. Alo-Alo runs away from the thunder emitting from the World Tree and retrieves the stone-turned Godfried to the World Tree. Maron disappears saying everyone should open their pure thoughts and save the World Tree seed. Inside the World Tree seed, Al hears everyone's voices calling him and declares that he wants to save Zakteman. He comes out and fights Zakteman, but just when he is about to win, he stops his attack and asks Zakteman to stop fighting and talk. Zakteman attacks Al and he drops down. Everyone ignites lights for Al, all the Yetis add their power, Nina ties the handkerchief on Al's arm. All of these help revive Al. Even as Zakteman says he will attack him, everyone says that they will be his friends and join their feelings together for the World Tree. Finally the World Tree completely revives and Zakteman dissolves and changes into a person named Maron (but she looks completely different), arrives and revives Godfried and even returns Grande.
26	"Appreciation" "Chīsana Gokai to, Ōkina Kansha" (小さな誤解と、大きな感謝)	Unaired
Everything is peaceful. Al trains with Grande. The little monsters find out that Harp likes Gigan, because she is acting strangely. Nina tells this to Sora and she finds out that Nina is actually older than Sora. As Gallus joins everyone for dinner, they still discuss about Harp and Gigan (Barrow is not there since he is all depressed). After taking advice from Anji and Battol the children decide to go to Gigan to find out what he thinks. Barrow spies on Harp as she goes to Gigan to give him the cookies she baked. They get interrupted one after the other by Gallus and the children. Harp tells them she has liked Gigan since he saved her from Zakums long time ago. Barrow also thanks Gigan for helping her, even when there were tribal differences. At this point, the Zakums attack to get the cookies from Harp. Even though they are initially driven off by Gallus and Gigan, Al and Nina finally retrieve the cookies. As Harp gives the cookies to Gigan, Yeti helps in sharing the cookies with everyone, thus sharing happiness also.
