= List of Inukami! characters =

This is a list of characters from the light novel, manga, and anime series Inukami!.

== Main characters ==
Yoko (ようこ, Yōko)
Voiced by: Yui Horie
Yoko is the titular heroine of the series. She has two main abilities. The first is jaen (邪炎; "evil flame"), where she shoots a coiling strand of fire out of her fingertips. There is also dai-jaen (大邪炎; "great evil flame"), which is just a larger, more powerful variation. The second ability is shukichi, an ability which allows her to teleport objects. Although she is generally fearless in the face of evil spirits, she is terrified of normal dogs. Later on in the series, it is revealed that Yoko is not an inukami at all, but rather a kitsune (which would explain her fear of dogs; foxes and dogs are natural enemies) and the daughter of the legendary Dai Yoko (Great Fox Spirit). During an escape from Hake, she met the child Keita, who was with her for three days and shared his chocolate cake with her, which became one of her favorite things. Due to this incident, she wanted to become Keita's inukami to make a contract with him and made sure this would happen by scaring away the other inukami candidates Keita in fact did have. The manga version of Yoko is very child-like, much more mischievous, and has been hinted to be a nine tailed kitsune.
Keita Kawahira (川平 啓太, Kawahira Keita)
Voiced by: Jun Fukuyama
Keita is the main protagonist of the series. He was considered a failure by his family due to his attitude towards their ancient duty to vanquish evil, treating it like a part time job, and his initial inability to find an inukami to bond with. Even though Yoko becomes his inukami and is fully interested in him, he has a bad habit of flirting with other girls; it is later revealed that Keita is mortified by the thought that, if he should develop a relationship with Yoko, he might become tamed by a woman and is not ready to settle down yet, in the anime this is replaced by the thought of Yoko having a litter of puppies rather than a human baby. He is frequently punished for his transgressions by Yoko, to whom he had to promise that he would be loyal to her, that he would be hers and that he would be her toy, to do with whatever she wanted, before she would contract with him. He wears a dog's collar as a symbol of this pact — an item he originally intended as his 'vow gift' to Yoko. In the anime series, Yoko has frequently landed him in jail by teleporting him into a public place without his clothes, causing him to be mistaken for a streaker and arrested for indecent exposure. Due to this, he has been named Ra-ō (Naked King) by the city's perverts (male and female alike). When he is naked, his groin is replaced by a child's drawing of an elephant.

Keita possesses considerable athletic skills, can make frog-shaped talismans up to around the size of his fist from rubber which he can use to make ranged attacks, and is a practitioner of xingyiquan. Despite his flaws, Keita has considerable redeeming qualities; he is determined, usually fearless, and loyal to his friends and to people under his protection. Keita's grandmother is the head of the Kawahira family. She has contracted a male inukami named Hake. In the manga, Keita is a chain smoker and is much more serious than his anime counterpart. He also appears to care for Yoko a great deal, but has problems taking her seriously because of her impulsive and mischievous behavior.
Shirō Karina (仮名 史郎, Karina Shirō)
Karina is a police official who frequently calls on Keita and Yoko for help with cases that have a spirit, monster or magical event at its core. He has stated that he is collecting the "devil's toys" created by an ancient wizard named Sekidōsai. He has more than once gotten Keita off the hook when the latter is once again arrested for indecent exposure after angering Yoko. Karina wields an enchanted weapon he calls Angel Blade in combat. One of its signature attacks is the Holy Crush. It is later revealed that Sekidōsai is his ancestor; the two men look very much alike, except for their different hair colors. Their characters are very different as well; whereas Karina is a morally upstanding person, Sekidōsai is a pervert. However, it is later hinted at that, subconsciously, Karina may be a pervert, although definitely not to the same extent as his ancestor. He is frequently shown in a variety of fetishes, some granted by misinterpreted wishes and others the products of his subconscious desires.
Tomekichi (留吉)
Tomekichi is 'the traveling cat', a two-tailed nekomata (a feline spirit-being capable of walking upright and speech, said to grow to about the size of a dog) who is traveling around to search for a statue of Buddha. The kindly feline is doing so in honor of a priest who once took care of it and Tomekichi's ancestor cat which he loved and treated well, the priest ended up losing the statue of Budda before he died. Even though his main duty is to search for the statue, he is also seen taking various jobs, such as being a referee for a medium's tournament. Tomekichi apparently holds considerable esteem among his own people; on one occasion, he leads several other felines in the performing of a barrier spell-chant, which was cast in his name.
Hake (はけ)
Hake is the Inukami of the head of the family who gives out most of the missions for the other members of the Kawahira family. He made a contract with the head of the family when she was near Keita's age on a Non-contract day (coincidentally her birthday fifty years before the start of the series), which he claims was because he was bored with his eternal, uneventful life. The contract item he was given are the decorative beads he wears.
Kaoru Kawahira (川平 薫, Kawahira Kaoru)
Voiced by: Yuki Kaida
Kaoru is Keita's cousin. Contrary to Keita, Kaoru has a pack of ten Inukami and he is generally well-thought of, being more restrained and respectable of demeanor, although he is no less kind at heart. All Kaoru's inukami care deeply for him and he seems to return the sentiment, although his connection with Nadeshiko is strongest of all and is probably romantic in nature. Like Keita, Kaoru is quite athletic and a powerful magic-user; his signature move is to command the wind to deliver destructive blasts with the medium of an orchestra conductor's baton. In the anime only, it is later revealed that Kaoru is under a curse that planted him in a fake body, one that is close to dying. He shared this secret only with Nadeshiko, whom he revealed that he loved. He was raised by an evil magician that feeds off of the despair emitted by the people around him. Kaoru therefore had everything taken from him by the magician. He later sacrifices himself to save Nadeshiko, and it is then that he confesses his love.
Hakusan Meikun
Hakusan is a large green frog who after breaking a rule in heaven became a fallen wizard. Keita made a contract with him due to his kindness and freed him from his sentence he was serving above earth in a cloud invisible to humans. In return Hakusan gave Keita the magical ability to make frogs explode on impact.

== Kaoru's pack ==
Nadeshiko (なでしこ)
Voiced by: Kaori Nazuka
Nadeshiko is an Inukami from the same area as Yoko, who has contracted with Keita's cousin, Kaoru. In sharp contrast to all other Inukami, she initially appears to be pacifistic and to regret the vanquishing of spirits and monsters. Her attitude and unwillingness to join in fights lead to her being temporarily expelled by her pack. Hake sends Nadeshiko to work with Keita as an example to Yoko, who has commented that Nadeshiko is the only one of Kaoru's pack of Inukami with any merit, but resents having her near her contractor, especially since Keita is clearly attracted to Nadeshiko. When the pack challenges Yoko so Nadeshiko might stay with Keita for good, they lose spectacularly and Nadeshiko ends up saving them, showing she has considerable courage and regaining the pack's appreciation by placing herself between Yoko and the pack alpha, Sendan. She constantly wears maid attire, and it is worth noting that Nadeshiko sees Keita's positive qualities from the start and may once have considered contracting with him. She and Kaoru seem to share a special bond that causes some jealousy from her pack-mates at times. Her item, like all the other girls, is a ring, but it is placed on the ring finger of her left hand. This may have been done to hint at how Nadeshiko and Kaoru feel about each other. Nadeshiko's senses are apparently keener than those of the other Inukami and Yoko has said that Nadeshiko has an ability the rest of her pack lacks.
In the anime, it is later revealed that Nadeshiko is a brutally powerful warrior if roused, the master of a power she calls 'the Hammer of Destruction', which smashes everything in its path. At the beginning of the series, Nadeshiko had 'given up her power to Heaven', due to an incident when she had lost herself in the frenzy of battle and nearly destroyed a human village. For a time, she refused to fight anyone or take a master - until she met Kaoru. Only when Kaoru is killed by Jasei does Nadeshiko reclaim the Hammer, which is powerful enough to overwhelm even Jasei.
Tomohane (ともはね)
Voiced by: Shizuka Hasegawa
Tomohane is the youngest of the pack of Inukami that has contracted with Kaoru. She has the special ability to track the path of otherworldly entities and apparently has some skill with chemistry. As the youngest and weakest member of her pack, Tomohane fears that she will hold her allies back and so she tries very hard to keep up with the rest of the Inukami. After an adventure involving Keita and a minor spirit-creature - a mujina - which she later adopted as a pet and named Maron, Tomohane was the second of Kaoru's Inukami to recognize Keita's good side.
Sendan (せんだん)
Voiced by: Yuki Matsuoka
Sendan is the leader of Kaoru's pack of Inukami. She seems strict and demanding, but appears so because she seems to have the wellbeing of her contractor and master at heart at all times. Only perfect service is good enough for 'Kaoru-sama'. Sendan is the younger sister of Hake, the male Inukami that serves the head of the Kawahira family. Like her older brother, she always carries around a fan.
Igusa (いぐさ)
Voiced by: Yoko Honda
Igusa is another member of the pack that serves Kaoru. She has green hair, which she wears in two braids and she wears spectacles. Igusa secretly writes shōnen manga under the pseudonym 'Ruriko Saffron' and is extremely shy, causing her to be nervous when around Keita when he's in a perverted mood or when she perceives him to be thus. Despite her fear of perversion in men, she appears to be a closet fan of shōnen-ai situations herself - a fact she apparently hides from her fellow pack members.
Tayune (たゆね)
Voiced by: Rika Morinaga
Tayune is the sporty-looking, short-haired member of the pack that serves Kaoru. Tayune is a physical person, quick to beat Keita when she feels he is being perverted towards her, quite loud and prideful. Oddly, she is apparently also deathly afraid of ghost stories and scary things. In combat, she sometimes wields a short staff as a blunt weapon. She is often teased by her fellow Inukami for being scared, and for supposedly getting romantically attached to Keita. Tayune is brutally powerful in combat, possibly second only to Nadeshiko when the latter is fully empowered among Kaoru's inukami.
Gokyōya (ごきょうや)
A gray-haired Inukami who near-constantly wears a white lab coat and may be the oldest of Kaoru's Inukami. Gokyōya is studying seriously to become a doctor at some point and is close friends with two other of Kaoru's Inukami, Furano and Tensō. Before she became Kaoru's inukami, she was linked by contract to Keita's father, Sōta; she still has warm feelings for him, which she has in part transferred to Keita. Gokyōya may be the oldest of Kaoru's inukami, as she displays greater maturity than many of her pack members.
Imari (いまり) & Sayoka (さよか)
Voiced by: Aya Endō & Ryōko Shintani
Twin sister Inukami, both contracted to Kaoru. They wear identical dresses, blue with white in the front. Their hair is a light purple tied into one ponytail, Imari's on the right of her head, Sayoka's on the left, held by a giant bead. The twins are usually in perfect agreement, the only time they are seen fighting each other is when they are gunning for the No. 1 rank in Kaoru's pack, or when under the influence of a love philter. They are almost never seen apart and finish each other's sentences often. The hobby of the twins is growing weird vegetables and plants and testing out their effects, mainly on Keita. In combat, they typically team up on enemies, attacking from opposing sides and sometimes taking items from their target as they strike. Although they are accepted members of Kaoru's pack, their pack-mates consider the twins sly and somewhat unscrupulous and untrustworthy. During the conflict over ranking within the pack, none of the other inukami involved wanted to accept any position beneath the twins, since they feared they would be forced to do all the twins' chores or suffer other troublesome situations.
Furano (フラノ)
An Inukami in Kaoru's pack who wears miko attire and has short yellow hair. She has a limited ability to predict the future, though this seems to be a random chance. Furano is one of the least bashful and shy of the inukami in service to Kaoru, as she showed willingness to strip for Keita so that she could obtain the No. 1 ranking in Kaoru's household. She responded positively to Karina having his hand on her breast and is also of age, as she confirmed when she said that she could "Perform a little extra fan service" since she was "An 18+ character". She is closest to Gokyōya and Tensō among her fellow inukami.
Tensō (てんそう)
An Inukami in Kaoru's pack. She wears overalls and has long brown hair that falls down to cover her eyes. Tensou rarely talks, instead opting to draw on her sketch pad a picture of what the person just described. The drawings are done fast and with much detail and accuracy. When Tensō does speak, it is in a low, quiet voice, normally only supplementing what others say. She is perhaps the most reclusive of the Inukami, but is close friends with Gokyōya and Furano.

== Citizens of the Darkness ==
A group whose name was conceived by Naoki Kawarazaki. Basically, it consists of every person who is 'outside society' in some manner, usually because of some sexual or personal habit which is generally considered undesirable. They consist of such people as peeping toms, otaku, flashers and lingerie thieves. They consider Keita to be one of them, to his immense chagrin. Despite their personal quirks, the Citizens of the Darkness come to the aid of the 'Citizens of the Light' (just about anyone who isn't one of them) several times against Sekidōsai and Jasei. As Kawarazaki has said, without the world of light, there can be no world of darkness.

Naoki Kawarazaki (河原崎 直己, Kawarazaki Naoki)
Naoki Kawarazaki is Keita's senpai at school and a dedicated otaku. He pursues Yoko as he wants to use her as a model for a dōjinshi character, but unfortunately makes the mistake of complimenting her tail for its plumpness and comparing it to a tanuki's. Apparently, Inukami admire thin tails. He is a cosplay maniac, who enjoys seeing both men and women of any age dressed in "moe" female clothing. Kawarazaki is the first to name and organize the citizens of the darkness in the battle against Sekidōsai. He sometimes comes off as a pervert or psycho, (such as when he chases Tomohane around the entire city to use her as a model), but his intentions are always good, earning him respect from Keita and Yoko.
Boss
A large, muscular man who terms himself a "lingerie artist," but is simply called an underwear thief by most other people. He is quite knowledgeable on various brands and manufacturers of underwear and has received special training so he can remain unobserved while he goes about his 'life's path'. The Boss has on several occasions annoyed Kaoru's inukami by (attempting to) steal their lingerie, but he has also been instrumental in the battle to destroy the robot Xanthippe. Whenever he is seen, the Boss wears trousers, boots and lingerie; generally a pair of panties on his head and a bra on his chest. He apparently forms a team with the Peeping Doctor and the Chief Clerk.
Peeping Doctor
A man dressed in a top hat and dinner suit, who apparently has developed his skills at hiding into the ability to become invisible. While most of the time he uses this power for peeping on women, Kaoru's inukami among them, he also uses it to help Keita during battles against Sekidōsai. He has considerable skill in the art of invisibility, as he can sneak past most of Kaoru's inukami, and was able to get close enough to Sekidōsai to steal his book, dodge his attacks and escape. The Peeping Doctor claims that he never returns to any place where he has been spotted and affects gentlemanly airs despite his unpleasant hobby. He apparently forms a team with Boss and the Chief Clerk.
Chief Clerk
The third member of the team further consisting of the Boss and the Peeping Doctor, the Chief Clerk is a man who usually wears a three-piece suit and much resembles a bespectacled salaryman. The main physical difference between him and any other salaryman is that he constantly goes about tied up in bondage ropes. Another glaring difference is that most businessmen do not, generally speaking, go about begging to be punished; the Chief Clerk is a fervent masochist who constantly begs people to scold and/or punish him and managed to anger Yoko greatly by asking her to break him to her will. In combat, the Chief Clerk's masochistic tendencies sometimes come in use, as even Jasei's skeletal troops seemed to be taken aback by his aggressive solicitation of punishment.

== Main antagonists ==
Boryoku no Umi (Sea of Violence)
Voiced by: Ken Narita
Boryoku no Umi is a Shinigami, a member of a race of powerful 'death gods/spirits' which, in the inukami setting, behave in a manner often hinting of insanity. A shinigami can do just about anything and will do anything - on a twisted whim. They delight in sowing death and destruction, with Boryoku no Umi being no exception. Boryoku no Umi first appears as the nemesis of the Shindō family, whose last member's guardian contracts Keita and Yoko to protect her. During his battle with Keita, he reveals that he has often granted the wishes of humans for the same price; by contract, he is allowed to murder the family members as they reach adulthood, one by one, until the whole family is dead. In the case of the Shindō family, Boryoku no Umi delighted in fighting any protectors they contracted with their own favored style of combat - and winning, killing all those who would not surrender. In addition to wearing a black shinigami robe, which deflects most ranged attacks, Boryoku no Umi is skilled in a vast array of martial arts and possesses powers of evil magic. Some of his favorite tricks are to awaken a person's deepest fears to paralyze them, or to evoke madness and terror by uttering a deafening shriek. In the end, it turns out a shinigami is not a match for an angered kitsune.
Dai Yoko (大妖狐, Dai Yōko)
Voiced by: Nobutoshi Canna
Dai Yoko is, in the words of inukami Hake, "A great monster that manipulates the dark side, petrifies his opponents, specializes in fire based spells" - namely the Jaen and Dai Jaen techniques also used by Yoko, only much more powerful - "shakes the universe with a single leap and can do anything with his breath. He is strong and arrogant. When he feels irritated, he will destroy a whole mountain." Dai Yoko is an elder kitsune who was sealed under a large stone by the founding patriarch of the Kawahira family and is also the father of Yoko, who he usually addresses as 'my dear daughter' or 'cute Yoko'. While all the things Hake said about him are true and do not even mention his ability to turn back time within a certain area, Dai Yoko is also a doting father. He is apparently incapable of being angry with his daughter, although she twice aided in sealing him to prevent him from doing damage. A bit of an embarrassing parent, Dai Yoko revealed he has been keeping a picture diary of every moment in his daughter's life, no matter how private. While he is initially dead-set against his daughter being together with Keita, he comes to change his mind, mainly because he is tricked into believing their relationship had already caused Yoko to become pregnant. In past times, Dai Yoko apparently defeated the evil wizard Sekidōsai in single combat. The reason he came up against the Kawahira family is that he wanted to conquer their mountain so his daughter would have a place to nap.
Sekidōsai (赤道斎)
Voiced by: Norio Wakamoto
Sekidōsai is a wizard of terrible power, who has managed to live well over 400 years. Of late, he has been forced to go into hiding inside a painting he made when he lost his powers, but he has already made plans to revive himself. Sekidōsai is the ancestor of Shirou Karina, who bears a striking resemblance to him. The main external difference is that Sekidōsai has a different hairstyle and white-blond hair. The characters of the two men are diametrically opposed; where Karina is a defender of justice and an agent of the law, Sekidōsai's main desire is to create a world without restrictions, where all can live according to their very darkest desires. In addition, Sekidōsai is a voluntary exhibitionist.
During his long life, Sekidōsai created several powerful items:
1. The book which caused the rising of the 'demon' in the first episode of Inukami, which can apparently also reflect attacks made against its bearer.
2. The mechanical rooster Socrates, which can change the clothing of people within a certain range to match the strongest desires of a person in its vicinity.
3. A robot oddly named Xanthippe, whose main weapon is a drill, set in its groin.
4. The Daisakkai, which appears to be a kind of magical computer that initially serves to govern the world inside Sekidōsai's painting refuge. Later, it manages Sekidōsai's stolen energies. Daisakkai's ultimate purpose is to use the energies it receives to grant any single wish.
Jasei
Jasei is a wizard who claims to have 'mastered the art of magic'. His human body was destroyed during a magical experiment, but he lives on in a state reminiscent of lichdom, with a large gem in what would have been his abdomen apparently sustaining his existence on Earth. Jasei powers his unnatural existence by feeding on despair. He is powerful and cunning, willing to concoct schemes which may take years to come to fruition, in order to reap the greatest possible amount of despair for his personal enjoyment. One example of this was his raising and tutoring Kaoru Kawahira to be a good and kind person, after having placed the boy's soul in a counterfeit body, all with the eventual goal of revealing the depth of his own evil, sadism and treachery so Kaoru's heart and spirit would be broken. Jasei is an even more powerful wizard than Sekidōsai, as he proved capable of hoodwinking the latter without his even noticing, and after harnessing Dai Yoko, and Sekidōsai's powers wields enough of it to overwhelm most of the Inukami and Yoko combined.
