= Path to Nowhere =

Chinese-made video game

- Developer: Aisno Games
- Publishers: CHN: MBCC; WW: AISNO
- Engine: Unity3D
- Platforms: Android, iOS
- Release: WW: October 27, 2022
- Genre: Strategic role-playing
- Mode: Single-player

Path to Nowhere (Chinese: 无期迷途; pinyin: wúqīmìtú; Japanese: 無期迷途; Korean: 무기미도) is a tower defense role-playing game with gacha game elements developed and published by Chinese developers Aisno Games. The game officially went live on August 11, 2022 in Mainland China, shortly followed by a worldwide release on October 27, 2022 on both Apple Store and Google Play.

Set in the fictional megalopolis of DisCity, the player character assumes the role of the Chief of the Minos Bureau of Crisis Control (MBCC), tasked with resolving crises of varying severity brought on by Mania, a mutation that erodes an individual's consciousness until they turn into monsters. The MBCC is composed primarily of Sinners, individuals possessing powerful abilities who retain their consciousness in spite of Mania contamination. As the story progresses, the player encounters several Sinners, treading the line between duty and justice while navigating a post-apocalyptic world.

Path to Nowhere makes several references to Dante Alighieri's Divine Comedy. For example, the primary setting of the game is DisCity, corresponding to the City of Dis that lies beyond the River Styx in the Inferno. The organization the player character is affiliated with is the MBCC, echoing the name of the guardian of the Second Circle within the Inferno, Minos. Additionally, Sinners are classified according to alignment in in-game archives. These alignments include Limbo, Anger, Heresy, Greed, Violence, Love, Sloth, Fraud and Treachery, closely resembling the Nine Circles of Hell.

== Gameplay ==
The "Sinners" are a group of mutated and dangerous convicts. They have lost their minds, but gained extraordinary abilities.

=== Combat ===
Certain Sinners possess ultimates capable of breaking enemy cores. These cores are indicated by the orange dots below each locked-on enemy's red healthbar.

Characteristic of the tower defense subgenre, users play within a battlefield grid during combat stages, where up to six Sinners can be deployed and moved around by the player to achieve a given objective. Most combat stages have a specified move limit, time limit, and Sanity (SAN). When SAN reaches 0 during battle, a player must restart the stage. There are also several tactical elements at play, including the strategic use of a Sinner's unique powerful attack (an ultimate) to defeat enemies in battle. Each Sinner can be further categorized by damage type, class (tendency), and ability to break "cores," a defining trait of certain powerful enemies. Enemies with intact cores take reduced damage, but enemies with broken cores are rendered immobile and take increased damage. Additionally, players can make use of Potestas (player-exclusive skills) in battle.

=== Eternal Nightmare ===
Initially a time-limited event introduced on July 18, 2023, the rogue-like gamemode offered players more varied combat gameplay, allowing players to experience unique paths depending on combat encounters, random events and their choice in buffs and debuffs.

== Plot ==
=== Prologue ===
The player wakes up from a consciousness repair module, broken by an intruder. She takes a sample of the player's blood, morphing into their form. The player is later saved by Adjutant Nightingale, who reveals herself as the player's secretary, and the player is the Chief of the MBCC, where they "shackle" dangerous Sinners and keeps them from damaging DisCity. The intruder's invasion sets all the Sinners free, except two - Hella, and Hecate. They both are shackled by the Chief after Hecate teaches them to control their powers. They then take out waves of prisoners and mutant beasts until they reach the intruder. The application of the shackles reveals the intruder's true form, and she promises to wait at the end of their journey with all the answers they seek, and leaves.

=== Chapter 1: SALVA Chaos A ===
The Chief officially accepts their position, and was given their first mission - to find the intruder in Syndicate, who was codenamed Suspect R. Nightingale explains that Syndicate was the economic center of DisCity until a few years ago when excessive contamination destroyed its economy, and Syndicate was completely conquered by gangsters. The Chief leads their team into Syndicate, and was immediately attacked by an unknown Sinner, but was saved by support from the Public Security Bureau - a gangster named Ted, who wishes to destroy a powerful Syndicate gang named Legion. He then explains about SALVA - a medical organization that conducts illegal experiments on mutated monsters (Corruptors) and neuromodulation surgeries, and is currently protecting a Sinner with the power to control Mania itself, calling it the inheritance. After brutally interrogating a SALVA doctor and an altercation with Ted's subordinates, Ted then launches an attack on SALVA. His own men begin to mutate, but he pays no heed to it. The gates of SALVA then open, and the doctors unleash a neurotoxin on the team. However, Ted escapes and the team is taken by SALVA. The head of SALVA - Iron, realizes that Mania is completely suppressed in both of the Sinners and the Chief, claiming that they might be the key to control Mania. They later find the Sinner who attacked them, laying silently on a bed in SALVA.

=== Chapter 2: SALVA Chaos B ===
Waking up in the hospital, the Chief finds themselves against SALVA's head, Doctor Iron, who is interested in their ability to control Mania completely. The Chief realizes that SALVA's goal is to eliminate Mania, and they had it wrong the whole time. Iron explains the condition of the Sinner that attacked her, revealing that she has crossed the Mania limits of a human long ago, yet she persists to live; Iron also reveals that she is being controlled by someone through a Mania capsule embedded in her heart. Iron realizes the reason SALVA is being attacked is due to the Sinner that came to SALVA earlier. Ted launches a second attack on SALVA and gets Chief out, but they realize that Ted intended to use them from the beginning, and the Sinner that attacked them is Ted's subordinate. They immediately rush back into SALVA, from where Ted launches a Mania attack, killing most of the patients in its basement. They reach the basement after fighting many Corruptors, but find that Suspect R has escaped. The Sinner under Ted finally breaks his control, but she mutates nonetheless, and dies in the head nurse - Anne's arms. The Chief witnesses Corruptors trapped by SALVA, and Iron performing neuromodulation on patients to completely eliminate Mania inside them - confirming that the rumors are indeed true. Before they could do anything, the Legion arrives, forcing the MBCC team to escape, trailed by an assassin hired by the Legion.

=== Chapter 3: Unclaimed Crypt A ===
Trailed by the assassin, the MBCC team barely manage to escape with the help of a driver they found in Syndicate. Hella later reveals that she knows the assassin. The escapees were cornered by Zoya, the Legion's commander, who ambushes them. Waking up in a convoy, Zoya interrogates the Chief about the shackles, and later forces the Chief to brand her with the shackles. She also reveals that the Sinner the Chief is searching for is her subordinate. They then proceed into a hidden crypt, which most possibly holds the inheritance. The Legion's second-in-command Earl, uses his own Sinner power to place a bomb in the Chief's head while they were unconscious so they can neither escape nor threaten Zoya. The MBCC team and Legion together wipe out waves of gangsters, destroying many gangs in the process but the remnants get ahold of the Chief. Zoya seemingly realizes the Chief's intentions, and allows them to escape. Hella and Hecate trace them using the shackles and save them from the gangsters. Successfully escaping from the Legion, the Sinners decide to leave, but the Chief tells them to proceed toward the inheritance. Before going deeper, they find a well-concealed lab with the name PARMA written on the Mania crystals present. The inheritance's effect leads them to mutate and take the shape of the assassin. After defeating her, they finally head to the depths.

== Reception ==
Pocket Gamer gave the game a score of 4.5/5, writing: "Path to Nowhere is a compelling tower defence RPG with stunning visuals that make collecting characters an absolute thrill."
