= Peggy O'Neal (voice actress) =

American voice actress

- Years active: 1990–present

Peggy O'Neal is an American voice actress.

== Career ==
O'Neal began acting in three episodes of seaQuest DSV, and went on to do ADR on Dawson's Creek, Dark Skies, Walker, Texas Ranger. Through acting classes taught by Susan Blu, O'Neal got in contact with Paul Di Franco, a casting agent for Saban Entertainment. O'Neal's roles at Saban Entertainment included Shinzo character Yakumo Tatsuro.

In addition to voice acting, O'Neal works as a part-time teacher for acting classes at Moorpark College.

== Filmography ==
=== Anime ===
List of voice performances in anime
Year	Title	Role	Notes	Source
2000	Flint the Time Detective	Additional Voices		
2000	Shinzo	Yakumo Tatsuro		
2000	Digimon Adventure 02	Jun Motomiya, Mrs. Inoue		
2001	Digimon Tamers	Suzie Wong, Tally		
2002	Digimon Frontier	Ranamon / Calmaramon, Kid Kokuwamon (Ep. 5), Burgermon, Poyomon		
2008	Lucky Star	Ayano Minegishi, Miki Hiiragi		

=== Film ===
List of voice performances in feature films
Year	Title	Role	Notes	Source
2000	Digimon: The Movie	Botamon		

List of voice performances in direct-to-video and television films
Year	Title	Role	Notes	Source
2005	Digimon: Battle of Adventurers	Suzie Wong		
2005	Digimon: Runaway Locomon	Susie Wong, Tally		
2024	Digimon Adventure	Botamon, Additional Voices		
2024	Digimon Adventure: Our War Game!	Female Neighbor 2A, Additional Voices		

=== Video games ===
List of voice performances in video games
Year	Title	Role	Notes	Source
2004	Seven Samurai 20XX	Sallah		
2019	Catherine: Full Body	Lindsay Uspenski, Martha Uspenski		

=== Other dubbing ===
List of voice performances in other shows
Year	Title	Role	Notes	Source
2002	Power Rangers Wild Force	Wedding Dress Org		
