= Maesetsu! =

Japanese anime series

- Maesetsu! key visual

まえせつ！
- Light novel

Maesetsu! no Maesetsu
- Written by: Tōko Machida
- Illustrated by: Kagami Yoshimizu
- Published by: Kadokawa Shoten
- Magazine: Comptiq
- Original run: January 10, 2020 – November 10, 2020
- Volumes: 1
- Manga
- Illustrated by: Hato Kannazuki
- Published by: Media Factory
- Magazine: Monthly Comic Alive
- Original run: July 27, 2020 – May 27, 2021
- Volumes: 2
- Anime television series
- Directed by: Yuu Nobuta
- Written by: Touko Machida; Shōta Gotō; Joe Itou
- Music by: Satoru Kōsaki; Oliver Good; Keita Inoue
- Studio: Studio Gokumi; AXsiZ
- Licensed by: Crunchyroll
- Original network: AT-X, Tokyo MX, BS NTV, MBS
- Original run: October 11, 2020 – December 27, 2020
- Episodes: 12

Maesetsu!: Opening Act (まえせつ！) is an original Japanese anime television series co-animated by Studio Gokumi and AXsiZ. The series aired from October to December 2020, while a manga adaptation by Hato Kannazuki was serialized from July 2020 to May 2021 in Monthly Comic Alive.

== Characters ==
=== Owarai geinin ===
Tokonatsu (とこなつ)

Fubuki Kitakaze (北風 ふぶき, Kitakaze Fubuki)
Voiced by: Aguri Ōnishi (Japanese); Jackie Lastra (English)
Mafuyu Kogarashi (凩 まふゆ, Kogarashi Mafuyu)
Voiced by: Naomi Ōzora (Japanese); Madeline Dorroh (English)

RDeco (R凸, Āru Deko)

Rin Araya (新谷 りん, Araya Rin)
Voiced by: Hiromi Igarashi (Japanese); Remi Joseph (English)
Nayuta Asōgi (朝生祇 なゆた, Asōgi Nayuta)
Voiced by: Sakura Nakamura (Japanese); Xanthe Huynh (English)

Tundra / Money&Kane (つんどら / マネー&カネー, Tsundora / Manē ando Kanē)

Manatsu Kogarashi (凩 まなつ, Kogarashi Manatsu)
Voiced by: Yūki Takada (Japanese); Courtney Shaw (English)
Kanae Kanari (金成 かなえ, Kanari Kanae)
Voiced by: Nozomi Furuki (Japanese); Courtney Chu (English)

JK Cool (JKクール, Jeikē Kūru)

Eru Kusaba (草葉 える, Kubasa Eru)
Voiced by: Asuka Aida (Japanese); Alyson Leigh Rosenfeld (English)
Arashi Waraino (藁猪野 あらし, Waraino Arashi)
Voiced by: Ayaka Shimizu (Japanese); Jorjeana Marie (English)

Freak! (ふりいくっ!, Furiiku!)

Junki Tomita (富田 純基, Tomita Junki)
Voiced by: Himself (Japanese); Adin Rudd (English)
Ubu no Hatsuna (うぶのハツナ)
Voiced by: Herself (Japanese); Amber Li (English)

BAN BAN BAN

Masatake Yamamoto (山本 正剛, Yamamoto Masatake)
Voiced by: Himself (Japanese); Marc Thompson (English)
Hiromi Sameshima (鮫島 一六三, Sameshita Hiromi)
Voiced by: Himself (Japanese); Billy Bob Thompson (English)

NON STYLE (Non Sutairu)

Yūsuke Inoue (謎のお客さん / NON STYLE 井上 / 井上 裕介, Nazo no Okyakusan / Non Style Inoue / Inoue Yūsuke)
Voiced by: Himself (Japanese); Doug Stone (English)
Akira Ishida (石田 明, Ishida Akira)
Voiced by: Himself (Japanese); Mike McFarland (English)

Spike (スパイク, Supaiku)

Shiho Matsuura (松浦 志穂, Matsuura Shiho)
Voiced by: Herself (Japanese); Rebeka Thomas (English)
Haruna Ogawa (小川 暖奈, Ogawa Haruna)
Voiced by: Herself (Japanese); Larissa Gallagher (English)

Yoshimoto New Comedy (吉本新喜劇, Yoshimoto Shinkigeki)

Keiko Matsuura (松浦 景子, Matsuura Keiko)
Voiced by: Herself (Japanese); Erica Schroeder (English)

TEEUP (ティーアップ, Tīappu)

Masaru Maeda (前田 勝, Maeda Masaru)
Voiced by: Himself (Japanese); Mike Pollock (English)
Hiroshi Hasegawa (長谷川 宏, Hasegawa Hiroshi)
Voiced by: Himself (Japanese); Mike McFarland (English)

Woman Rush Hour (ウーマンラッシュアワー, Ūman Rasshu Awā)

Daisuke Muramoto (村本 大輔, Muramoto Daisuke)
Voiced by: Himself (Japanese); Matt Giroveanu (English)
Paradise Nakagawa (中川 パラダイス, Nakagawa Paradaisu)
Voiced by: Himself (Japanese); Gary Mack (English)

=== Other characters ===
Hajime Nakama (中間 はじめ, Nakama Hajime)
Voiced by: Risako Murai (Japanese); Heather Gonzalez (English)
Manager (男爵邸 店長, Danshakutei Tenchō)
Voiced by: Seirou Ogino
Carlos Ali (男爵邸 カーロス・アリ, Danshakutei Kārosu Ari)
Voiced by: Kentarō Tone (Japanese); Luis Bermudez (English)
Aunt Keiko (男爵邸 けいこおばちゃん, Danshakutei Keiko Obachan)
Voiced by: Rei Shimoda
Haruna Funakoshi (船越 はるな, Funakoshi Haruna)
Voiced by: Shizuku Hoshinoya (Japanese); Madigan Kacmar (English)
Shiho Siina (椎名 しほ, Sīna Shiho)
Voiced by: Yūko Mori (Japanese); Triya Leong (English)
Ms. Hirano (平野 先生, Hirano Sensei)
Voiced by: Aya Hirano (Japanese); Wendee Lee (English)
JK Cool Manager Yamada (JKクール マネージャー 山田, Jeikē kūru manējā Yamada)
Voiced by: Hirokazu Hiramatsu (Japanese); Mike McFarland (English)

== Media ==
=== Light novel ===
A light novel written by Touko Machida and illustrated by Kagami Yoshimizu was released on December 10, 2020, entitled Opening Act of Maesetsu! (まえせつ!のまえせつ, Maesetsu! no Maesetsu) by Kadokawa Shoten.

No.	Release date	ISBN
-	December 10, 2020	978-4-04-111005-8

=== Manga ===
A manga adaptation illustrated by Hato Kannazuki launched in Media Factory's Monthly Comic Alive on July 27, 2020, and it ended on May 27, 2021. Two tankōbon volumes were released between November 21, 2020, and June 23, 2021.

No.	Release date	ISBN
1	November 21, 2020	978-4-04-064890-3
2	June 23, 2021	978-4-04-680470-9

=== Anime ===
On July 10, 2019, Kadokawa announced that an original anime television series involving scriptwriter Shōta Gotō and Kagami Yoshimizu, the author of Lucky Star, was in production. The series is animated by Studio Gokumi and AXsiZ, with Yuu Nobuta as director. Touko Machida, Shōta Gotō and Joe Itou are writing the scripts, Katsuzo Hirata is designing the characters, and Satoru Kōsaki, Oliver Good and Keita Inoue are composing the series' music. The series was originally scheduled to premiere in July 2020, but was delayed to October 2020 due to the COVID-19 pandemic. The series aired from October 11 to December 27, 2020. Act 0 of the series premiered on October 4, 2020. Funimation acquired the series and is streaming it on its website in North America and the British Isles, and on AnimeLab in Australia and New Zealand. The series ran for 12 episodes.

No.	Title (Note: English translated titles are taken from Funimation.)	Directed by	Written by	Original release date
1	"Comedy!"; Transliteration: "Owarai!" (Japanese: おわらい！)	Hiroyuki Ōshima	Tōko Machida	October 11, 2020
2	"Thrills!"; Transliteration: "Kaikan!" (Japanese: かいかん！)	Kōhei Hatano	Tōko Machida	October 18, 2020
3	"Goals!"; Transliteration: "Mokuhyō!" (Japanese: もくひょう！)	Hodaka Kuramoto	Gōto Aogiri	October 25, 2020
4	"Business!"; Transliteration: "Eigyō!" (Japanese: えいぎょう！)	Naoki Murata	Tōko Machida	November 1, 2020
5	"Comeback!"; Transliteration: "Bankai!" (Japanese: ばんかい！)	Hirokazu Yamada	Tōko Machida	November 8, 2020
6	"Twogether!"; Transliteration: "Futari de!" (Japanese: ふたりで！)	Akira Katō	Gōto Aogiri	November 15, 2020
7	"Osaka!"; Transliteration: "Ōsaka!" (Japanese: おおさか！)	Hiroyuki Ōshima	Atsushi Itō	November 22, 2020
8	"Excitement!"; Transliteration: "Shigeki!" (Japanese: しげき！)	Yoshihide Kuriyama	Tōko Machida	November 29, 2020
9	"Partners!"; Transliteration: "Aikata!" (Japanese: あいかた！)	Shunji Yoshida	Tōko Machida	December 6, 2020
10	"Prayers!"; Transliteration: "Gankake!" (Japanese: がんかけ！)	Tatsuya Sasaki	Gōto Aogiri	December 13, 2020
11	"Showdown!"; Transliteration: "Kessen!" (Japanese: けっせん！)	Hodaka Kuramoto	Tōko Machida	December 20, 2020
12	"Opening Act!"; Transliteration: "Maesetsu!" (Japanese: まえせつ！)	Tatsuya Fujinaka; Yū Nobuta	Tōko Machida	December 27, 2020
