= List of Lucky Star characters =

This is a list of characters from the Japanese manga, video game, and anime series Lucky Star.

== Main characters ==
Schoolgirls from the anime (from left to right): Ayano, Patricia, Tsukasa, Yutaka, Konata, Kagami, Minami, Miyuki, Hiyori, and Misao.

=== Konata Izumi ===
Konata Izumi (泉 こなた, Izumi Konata)
Voiced by: Ryō Hirohashi (old drama CD, NDS video game), Aya Hirano (anime, PS2 and PSP video game, new drama CD, Miyakawa-ke no Kūfuku anime and drama CD), Wendee Lee (English)
Konata is the leader of the Lucky Star crew, and the main protagonist of the series. She is the shortest of the main characters. Nicknamed "Kona-chan" (こなちゃん), she is an eccentric but friendly and outgoing tomboy, with a mischievous yet good-natured sense of humor. She is smart, but does not apply herself to studying, thus her grades are a bit variable. However, she is an expert at pulling "all-nighters". In contrast to her studying habits, she loves playing video games. This can be seen in the OVA for the series, it is revealed that the MMORPG she plays with Nanako Kuroi is "Tower of Druaga: Recovery of Babylim". In addition, she is a boyish otaku who loves manga and anime, which is also due to her father, Sōjirō Izumi's, influence along with the games, and likes to collect all sorts of paraphernalia relating to her favorite series. Her father buys adult games for himself, so she is able to play and enjoy them. In the anime, Konata constantly makes references to popular games, anime, and manga.
In order to fund her interests, Konata had a part-time job at a cosplay café in Akihabara. She often plays late into the night, hence why she tends to fall asleep in class, which makes her a frequent victim to her homeroom teacher, Nanako Kuroi. Konata rarely eats a "normal" Japanese lunch, as she frequently eats only a chocolate cornet.
Her physique is smaller than average when compared to her peers, which she claims has not changed since she was in the sixth grade. She is ambidextrous, in contrast to the mostly left-handed main cast. She has very long, blue hair which comes down to her calves with a large ahoge, sleepy eyes, a catlike smile and a beauty mark under her left eye, just like her father. Her mother, Kanata Izumi, died when she was an infant, and she has lived alone with her father since. In her third year of high school, however, her cousin, Yutaka Kobayakawa, came to live at her house, giving a total of three people in the Izumi residence. Although Konata spends most of her time playing games in her room, she has a darker skin tone, like her father's.
Both of her voice actresses for the animated version, Aya Hirano for the Japanese version and Wendee Lee for the English version, are in fact the same people who voiced Haruhi Suzumiya in The Melancholy of Haruhi Suzumiya anime; other voice actors from the same series make guest appearances during the course of Lucky Star. Konata placed seventh in 2channel's SaiMoe 2007 contest, came in second place in the category of "Best Female Character" in the thirtieth Anime Grand Prix, and ranked third in Newtype's "Top 10 Female Characters of 2007" poll. Additionally, Konata placed first in a poll for flat-chested girls on the Anime One website.

=== Kagami Hiiragi ===
Kagami Hiiragi (柊 かがみ, Hiiragi Kagami)
Voiced by: Ami Koshimizu (old drama CD, Nintendo DS video game), Emiri Katō (anime, radio, PS2 and PSP video game, new drama CD, Miyakawa-ke no Kūfuku anime and drama CD), Kari Wahlgren (English)
Kagami is the older fraternal twin sister of Tsukasa Hiiragi. In school, her grades are excellent, as she studies very hard, and she was elected class president in her first year. She is in a different class than Konata Izumi and Tsukasa, but she frequently comes to their class during lunch time to eat with Tsukasa. Additionally, Kagami chose the humanities stream in her second year, so that she could be with her friends, but she was the only one separated into a different classroom; the same occurred in her third year. Kagami, occasionally referred to as "Kagamin" (かがみん) by Konata, is very boyish, a bit egotistical, and not as good a cook as Tsukasa. Konata loves to irritate her, and their arguments act as one of the main factors of comic relief throughout the series. Kagami is usually annoyed by Konata's constant references to her otaku interests, but usually has an idea of what she is saying.
Kagami's physique is average, but she is flat chested like her twin and Konata. Though Kagami is a tough tomboy, she has a very girly side. She is usually concerned about her weight, counting every kilogram she gains or loses. Kagami likes to eat sweet food and she is often seen eating sweet food at night, such as chocolate Pocky sticks. Despite her concern about her weight, she has no willpower controlling her eating habit, being the tomboy she is, resulting in an "eat now, fret later" attitude. She has long, purple hair with a ribbon tied into bunches, and unlike Tsukasa, has sharp tsurime eyes. Kagami is the quintessential "tsundere"; she on one side can be the straight and intolerant type however, she is prone to become shy and lonely at times. Kagami is constantly attempting to hide the fact that she has a deep sense of attachment to her friends, especially Konata. She also seems to take a twisted delight in mocking Konata's smaller-than-average physique, her lack of motivation and her tendency to be a troublemaker, which usually results in Konata becoming very defensive. In spite of all this, she really does care about Konata, and is almost always willing to go places or do favors for her.
Similarly to Konata, Kagami is a tomboy who likes video games, but plays a different genre than Konata: scrolling shooters. She loves to read light novels, but is lonely, as no one around her has the same interests as her (though she is implied to have a knack for anime, since a stuffed Bonta-kun doll from Full Metal Panic! can be seen in her room). Both Kagami and Tsukasa are left-handed. Kagami shares the name of her creator, Kagami Yoshimizu, and according to the creator, Kagami was his pen name in his school days, and had her personality thought out long ago. Kagami became the 2008 Anime Saimoe Tournament's champion with her sister Tsukasa being runner-up.

=== Tsukasa Hiiragi ===
Tsukasa Hiiragi (柊 つかさ, Hiiragi Tsukasa)
Voiced by: Mai Nakahara (old drama CD, NDS video game), Kaori Fukuhara (anime, radio, PS2 and PSP video game, new drama CD, Miyakawa-ke no Kūfuku anime and drama CD), Michelle Ruff (English)
Tsukasa is the younger fraternal twin sister of Kagami Hiiragi and lives in a six-member family household as the youngest member. She is in the same class as Konata Izumi and excels in cooking. Kagami often uses the term "birds of a feather" to describe the similarities between Tsukasa and Konata, mostly their bad habits. Both often depend on Kagami for help on her homework, but their reasons are different: Tsukasa easily forgets her assignments, while Konata is just too lazy or preoccupied with her hobbies to do them herself. Unlike some of the other characters in the series, Tsukasa is not humorous and has not shown any particular interests in video games and anime, but she does like the Sgt. Frog series.
Tsukasa's physique is completely petite, unlike her sister. She is still average, being slightly taller than Konata. Like her twin and Konata, she is one of the flattest chested characters in the series. She has short, purple hair with a ribbon like a head band in it. Her tareme eyes are droopy and she is portrayed as a stereotypical klutz. Tsukasa is very shy, dreamy, gentle, girly, innocent, sensitive, and goodnatured as opposed to her rough twin. But Tsukasa is not a bright girl who gets decent grades without her twin's help. She once received a mobile phone for her birthday, but did not have much luck with it, as the phone was taken away by using it in class and later mistakenly ruined by putting it in the laundry, along with her skirt. Once, she left instant yakisoba alone after pouring hot water in it, only to come back later, discovering there was no water left to drain.
Tsukasa can be a pushover due to her complete nonconfrontational nature. Her naivety, shyness, and kindness gets taken advantage of at times. Konata tends to prank her easily because of this and in addition, Tsukasa is easily embarrassed, blushing a lot. She always stays in her comfort zone as a pure and timid girl.
Unlike most of the cast of Lucky Star, Tsukasa is a heavy sleeper, and cannot wake up at a set time, even when someone is present to rouse her. Like her sister, Tsukasa is left-handed.
She can be mistaken for cosplaying as Akari Kamigishi from To Heart when she wears her autumn school uniform, which is pointed out twice in the anime: once, when Konata gave her the actual uniform used in the To Heart anime for her birthday (while giving Kagami the "Brigade Chief" armband usually worn by Haruhi Suzumiya), and the second, when two people stopped her at Akihabara to take her picture, much to her embarrassment.

=== Miyuki Takara ===
Miyuki Takara (高良 みゆき, Takara Miyuki)
Voiced by: Erina Nakayama (old drama CD, NDS video game), Aya Endō (anime, PS2 and PSP video game, new drama CD, Miyakawa-ke no Kūfuku drama CD), Karen Strassman (English)
Miyuki is a young lady from a wealthy family who is beautiful, smart, and well-mannered. She always uses extremely polite Japanese, even when talking with her closest friends. She was the class president for her grade level in her first year, at the same time that she became good friends with Kagami. Now Miyuki is in the same class as Konata and Tsukasa, and is nicknamed "Yuki-chan" (ゆきちゃん) by Tsukasa. Miyuki's classmates often rely on her for help with their studies, and she is often shown giving impromptu but highly detailed, encyclopedic definitions or explanations on diverse and obscure matters, prompting Konata to once call her "Miwiki". She is shown being one of the top three best students in her grade for the semester.
She is described as a stereotypically friendly meganekko, or glasses-wearing girl and is the tallest of the girls. She is scared of contacts, and of putting them in her eyes, thus why she wears glasses. Her vision is less than 0.1 (20/200), though it had been good until elementary school, when she began reading books in the dark after her mother dozed off while reading to her in bed. She likes to read books, but does not read light novels. Miyuki loves to sleep, and she always goes to bed fairly early. She hates visits to the dentist, but frequently has to go to fix a loose crown or because of tooth decay. Due to her embodying such a large number of moe archetypes, Miyuki is frequently joked about by Konata due to her curvaceous figure. She is seen less often than the other three main characters.

== Supporting characters ==
=== Classmates ===
==== Main characters' classmates ====
Misao Kusakabe (日下部 みさお, Kusakabe Misao)
Voiced by: Mikako Takahashi (NDS video game and extra drama CD), Kaoru Mizuhara (anime, radio, PS2 and PSP video game, new drama CD, Miyakawa-ke no Kūfuku drama CD), Lara Jill Miller (English)
Misao is a childhood friend of Ayano since middle school, along with Kagami, her classmate. She is the stereotypical 'tomboy' of the group in contrast to her girly girl friend Ayano. Misao is a boyish girl who tends to be quite lazy, simple-minded and an outdoor type of person. She is in the track and field club, hates studying, and harbors a love for video games, despite not being particularly talented at them. She has tanned skin, brown hair, slightly slanted eyes, and a small fang in the side of her mouth.
Misao does not seem to be skilled at playing video games, yet plays them for purely for fun; she notes on having borrowed many games from various people. In fact, her concept of "play for fun" is so strong that she does not mind losing to Kagami, instead marveling at how well her friend plays and making a loud, congratulatory spectacle. This leaves Kagami with a sense of guilt and bewilderment. At one point, Kagami compared Ayano and Misao to Tsukasa and Konata respectively, even though Kagami herself is like Konata and Misao. Misao dislikes Konata for "stealing" Kagami away from her group, and often rants about Kagami leaving her group for Konata whom she knew for only one to two years. She calls Konata by the name "Chibikko" (ちびっ子) which is literally used as an equivalent for "midget" and can be literally translated to "shortie", and she is nicknamed "Misakichi" (みさきち) by Konata in the manga.
Ayano Minegishi (峰岸 あやの, Minegishi Ayano)
Voiced by: Yūko Gotō (NDS video game and extra drama CD), Mai Aizawa (anime, PS2 and PSP video game, new drama CD, Miyakawa-ke no Kūfuku drama CD), Peggy O'Neal (English)
Ayano is Kagami Hiiragi's classmate and has been in the same class with Kagami for the past five years, since middle school; she is a childhood friend of Misao. She is the stereotypical 'Yamato nadeshiko' of the group. She is very girly, friendly, gentle, passive and likes to take care of people, hence she is portrayed as Misao's caretaker. However, according to Misao, when Ayano does get angry, she is much more intimidating. Ayano holds back her long orange hair with a headband, but since her front hair is pulled back, she is looked at as having a large forehead. Also, she can make excellent cookies. She is the only Lucky Star girl who has a boyfriend (her boyfriend is actually Misao's older brother, according to volume 7). At one point, Kagami compared Ayano and Misao to Tsukasa and Konata respectively, both Konata and Misao being outgoing tomboys whilst Tsukasa and Ayano are shy girly girls. Though Kagami herself is similar to Konata and Misao, as she is very boyish, out there, and likes masculine hobbies. She worries much with Tsukasa.
Minoru Shiraishi (白石 みのる, Shiraishi Minoru)

==== Kō's classmates ====
Kō Yasaka (八坂 こう, Yasaka Kō)
Voiced by: Rika Morinaga (PS2 and PSP video game)
Kō is the president of the Animation Research Club, and is also the treasurer of the Student Council. She is called "Kō-chan-senpai" (こーちゃん先輩) by her juniors, including Hiyori, who is a member of the Animation Research Club, and is called "Yasako" (やさこ) by Tamaki. She is studying at Ryōō High School in class 2-F and is the only second year among the Lucky Star girls at the time of her appearance (the rest being either first- or third-year students). She enjoys playing anime-themed fighting games, and also likes to check on new and trendy things, never failing to miss one. She has played fighting games with Konata before, and does not notice that Konata is her senior. She has tanned skin, likes dōjinshi, manga, observing people, chatting, and gambling. In Lucky Star: Ryōō Gakuen Ōtōsai, she is a good friend of Yamato Nagamori.
Yamato Nagamori (永森 やまと, Nagamori Yamato)
Voiced by: Shion Hirota (PS2 and PSP video game)
Yamato is the central character of Lucky Star: Ryōō Gakuen Ōtōsai, the PlayStation 2 game of Lucky Star. A mysterious transfer student who transfer along with the protagonist in the game, her former school is Saint Fiorina All-Girls High School, and was in class 2-3 before she transferred to 3-B, the same class as Konata. She acts emotionless, spoiled and mysterious, giving her a typical tsuntsun personality. She was Kō's close friend when she was still a junior-high student. In the game, Yamato had a fatal collision with a star-shaped survey spaceship which crashed because of a mysterious event at Ryōō school festival. To prevent the accident from happening, the alien resurrects and fuses with Yamato who transfers to Ryōō High on a mission to reverse time several days before the festival to track down the accident's cause, and after telling the game's protagonist the reason behind the time loop and time reversals, Yamato hopes for the protagonist's trial-and-error déjà-vu to find ways to erase possible events in the school festival that would lead to the accident. After the puzzle is solved, Yamato reveals herself as an alien which leaves Yamato's body and erases everyone's memory about the whole incident and Yamato returns to Saint Fiorina All-Girls High School. In the manga, Yamato retains some alien powers such as ESP and projecting thought, though she's clueless why she can. Her hobby is karaoke and cycling. She likes soft adzuki bean jelly, Yukimi Daifuku, and summer. She dislikes shellfish, and winter.
Tamaki Yamanobe (山辺 たまき, Yamanobe Tamaki)
Tamaki is a girl in Kō's class and the Animation Research Club, introduced in volume seven of the manga. She is called "Yamasan" (山さん) by Kō and Miku.
Miku Busujima (毒島 みく, Busujima Miku)
Miku is a girl in Kō's class and the Animation Research Club, and is also class president, introduced in volume seven of the manga. She is called "Bussan" (毒さん) by Kō and Tamaki.

==== Yutaka's classmates ====
Yutaka Kobayakawa (小早川 ゆたか, Kobayakawa Yutaka)
Voiced by: Ai Shimizu (old drama CD, NDS video game), Shizuka Hasegawa (anime, PS2 and PSP video game, new drama CD, Miyakawa-ke no Kūfuku drama CD), Hynden Walch (English)
Yutaka is Konata's cousin and Yui's younger sister. She first appeared in episode fourteen in the anime when she was admitted into Ryōō High School and moves to live with Konata to help with the commute. She has been known to be quite sickly which has impacted her school life, but she remains cheerful nonetheless. She befriends Minami Iwasaki, Hiyori Tamura and Patricia Martin at school.
Minami Iwasaki (岩崎 みなみ, Iwasaki Minami)
Voiced by: Miyu Matsuki (old drama CD, NDS video game), Minori Chihara (anime, PS2 and PSP video game, new drama CD, Miyakawa-ke no Kūfuku drama CD), Michelle Ruff (English)
Minami comes from a wealthy family, and she lives across the street from Miyuki Takara. She owns a very large white dog and has a parasol in her yard. Her hobbies include reading books, playing the piano, and playing with her dog, Cherry. She is the stereotypical 'kuudere', a very silent girl (usually speaking in as few words as possible) who does not show much emotion, Minami is often mistaken for being cold, but she is very kind at heart. However, many jokes arise when her seemingly "perfectly sleek" appearance is contradicted, such as when Miyuki's mother notices Minami teaching Cherry how to stand on her hind legs by mimicking the position herself; Minami often blushes heavily and stares at the floor in response to such teasing. Like Konata, Minami has a flat chest as well, but she is ashamed of it. She was admitted to Ryōō Gakuen High School, along with Yutaka Kobayakawa, whom she met during the admissions exam; afterward, she helped Yutaka go to the nurse's office when she became sick. Once there, she gave Yutaka her handkerchief, which started their friendship. She and Yutaka are in the same class, and Minami is the class health officer. She's the 'mysterious' and 'emotionless' one out of the group according to her friends. Similar to Konata, in both the Japanese and English dubs of the anime she has the same voice actress as Yuki Nagato of The Melancholy of Haruhi Suzumiya; like Minami, Yuki is also a 'mysterious' and 'emotionless' character, although for different reasons.
Minami has short, mint-green hair and her eyes are slightly slanted upward, giving them a 'sharp' appearance similar to that of Kagami's. She is very slender and quite tall for her age. Due to her short hair and lean body structure, Minami has a tendency to look more androgynous than the other Lucky Star characters (a reason that Hiyori Tamura often pairs her and Yutaka as yuri models). She gets along with Miyuki, since they have similar tastes and are from the same neighborhood; Minami has often been compared to being Miyuki's "little sister" due to Minami's clingy attraction to her neighbor from when they were younger.
Hiyori Tamura (田村 ひより, Tamura Hiyori)
Voiced by: Ryōko Shintani (NDS video game and extra drama CD), Kaori Shimizu (anime, PS2 and PSP video game, new drama CD, Miyakawa-ke no Kūfuku drama CD), Philece Sampler (English)
Hiyori is an amateur dōjin artist, who is also the first-year classmate of Yutaka Kobayakawa and Minami Iwasaki. Additionally, she is an otaku who creates her own dōjinshi; her genres are broad, stretching from boys love to yuri. Hiyori is always searching for a good plot to use in her dōjinshi, and tends to imagine Yutaka and Minami in romantic moments, only to grow embarrassed over the idea and break into an emotional outburst, which leaves Yutaka and Minami clueless. Even if she has a moment of enlightenment, she fails to jot down notes about it, which causes her to forget what her great idea was about. Called "Hiyorin" (ひよりん) by Konata and Kō (also Konata called "Hiyo-hiyo" (ひよひよ) and Kō called "Hiyori"), she tends to be a kind person, but has unfortunate luck. Hiyori has a friendly personality, but is prone to becoming bashful, leading to simple mistakes during a decisive moment. Throughout the series it is implied that Hiyori has a hard time with animals. This is often portrayed by her interactions with Minami's dog, Cherry. For example, in the OVA, Cherry beats Hiyori with his paws and frightens her. Hiyori has long black hair, a wide forehead, and is a meganekko. She is a member of the Animation Research Club, and is Kō's junior.
Patricia Martin (パトリシア・マーティン, Patorishia Mātin)
Voiced by: Satsuki Yukino (old drama CD, NDS video game), Nozomi Sasaki (anime, PS2 and PSP video game, new drama CD, Miyakawa-ke no Kūfuku drama CD), Patricia Ja Lee (English)
Patricia, nicknamed "Patty" (パティ, Patti), is a first-year transfer student from the United States. She is in the same class as Yutaka Kobayakawa and Minami Iwasaki. Patricia is the happiest of the cast. She loves anime and manga and has learned all her Japanese through them, leading to her having a very unusual Japanese vocabulary. She tends to make quite a few generalizations of Japan and Japanese culture based on otaku culture, even more so than her senior, Konata Izumi. She claims to enjoy a wide range of Japanese music, however the only artists she listens to are those who have performed anime theme songs, and only those songs alone. She is extremely bubbly, energetic, and lively. Aside from Miyuki Takara, she has the second biggest chest size, and she is second tallest to Miyuki. Patricia works with Konata at the same cosplay café.
Izumi Wakase (若瀬 いずみ, Wakase Izumi)
Izumi is a girl in Hiyori's, Patricia's, Yutaka's, and Minami's class, introduced in volume seven of the manga. Like Patricia, she is also an otaku, but tries to hide it as she is an upper-class girl who is also class president. However, she runs into Hiyori on one of her shopping trips, who discovers her secret. She is good at home economics, but is bad at art. She likes "cute" things and sweets, as well as coffee and milk.

=== Teachers ===
Nanako Kuroi (黒井 ななこ, Kuroi Nanako)
Voiced by: Masumi Asano (old drama CD, NDS video game), Konomi Maeda (anime, PS2 and PSP video game, new drama CD, Miyakawa-ke no Kūfuku drama CD), Kate Higgins (English)
Nanako Kuroi is the homeroom teacher for Konata Izumi's class and her primary subject is world history. She is more like a friend than their teacher, as she has a relaxed personality. She frequently borrows and exchanges video games with Konata, and they both play the same online role-playing game. It is mentioned on multiple occasions that Konata is a tanker while Kuroi is a wizard who only does AOE skills. She is also online regularly, even on Christmas and New Year's Day. A running gag within the series is whenever Konata and Nanako are both online together, Nanako tells Konata to stop slacking off, but then continues to slack, herself.
Nanako has green eyes, and very long, blonde hair, which she ties at the back of her neck and her usual attire consists of purple pants, a white dress shirt, and a red tie, she also wears a purple pantsuit occasionally. Nanako is also ambidextrous and is a huge baseball fan, her favorite team being the Chiba Lotte Marines. Also, Nanako speaks in a fake Kansai accent. Nanako is single, often too busy playing video games. She is completely oblivious to Yui Narumi's marital status and converses sympathetically with Yui about single life.
Nanako frequently experiences realistic and humorously tragic computer troubles such as winding herself up for an online game only to be stopped by emergency maintenance on the gaming server or writing a very long online blog only to lose it to a brief Internet interruption during submission. Such incidents usually end with her going to bed and sniffing sadly in a pitiful fashion.
Hikaru Sakuraba (桜庭 ひかる, Sakuraba Hikaru)
Voiced by: Yuki Matsuoka (NDS video game and extra drama CD), Miki Inoue (anime, PS2 and PSP video game, new drama CD, Miyakawa-ke no Kūfuku drama CD), Dorothy Elias-Fahn (English)
Hikaru Sakuraba is the biology teacher at Ryōō High School, and is the homeroom teacher of Kagami's class 3-C. She is also the captain of the Lucky Star informational ad section, which was renamed "Lucky Paradise" (らっきー☆ぱらだいす) and "Super Lucky Channel" (超らっきー☆ちゃんねる, Chō Lucky Channel). She is feared by Akira, but Akira later calls Hikaru a betrayer. She likes CalorieMate and sleeping, dislikes vegetables, and people who quickly misunderstand things. She is Fuyuki's good friend, who works as a school nurse. She appears briefly in episode twenty-four of the anime, making sure that Akira and Minoru will do things right, who are in bad terms after the event of episode twenty-one of "Lucky Channel".
Fuyuki Amahara (天原 ふゆき, Amahara Fuyuki)
Voiced by: Kumi Sakuma (PS2 and PSP video game)
Fuyuki Amahara is the school nurse of Ryōō High School, and the advisor of the Tea Ceremony club. She first appeared in the omake part of volume four of the manga, but later appears regularly starting from volume five. Hikaru is her childhood friend and her guardian. She has a high popularity with the male students. Her hobbies are jogging and reading. She likes black tea, antique art, the occult and horror, but dislikes riding on boats and cannot swim. She, Yamato Nagamori and Kō Yasaka are the only characters who never made appearances in the anime, though the nurse's office is frequently referenced.

=== Families ===
==== Izumi family ====
Sōjirō Izumi (泉 そうじろう, Izumi Sōjirō)
Voiced by: Hirokazu Hiramatsu (anime, PS2 and PSP video game, new drama CD, Miyakawa-ke no Kūfuku drama CD), Tony Oliver (English)
Sōjirō is Konata Izumi's father, an author who works at home. He always wears loose, traditional Japanese clothing as his work clothes. He loves watching anime and playing video games, which influenced his daughter's interests. Sōjirō is "also a lolicon". This appreciation for neoteny may be one factor that caused him to fall in love with Kanata, whom he eventually married. He describes that he likes girls as some men do, but that he also appreciates younger ones. This means that this attraction is equal or possibly secondary, meaning he does not have a preference for them, so despite being a 'lolicon' (person with a lolita complex) he is not a pedophile. Throughout the show news reports and conversations indicate that young girls in the area are being approached by a strange man, and a running joke in the show involves hints that Sōjirō is in fact the one doing it. The best example of this is the opening, part of which involves Sōjirō spying on two schoolgirls from behind a lamppost.
Sōjirō is very thin, and has unshaven facial hair, he has a mole under his left eye which his daughter inherited and has thick eyebrows. Additionally, he is allergic to pollen and when he decided to wear goggles and masks as protection from it, Konata sighed that, "Now you look weirder as well". She also frequently reminds him, "Please don't do anything as to be taken away by the cops". Also, he often forgets to lock the door when he is using the toilet, which leaves Yutaka in tremendous shock.
Sōjirō holds a deep love for his wife, Kanata Izumi, who died many years before. When Konata asks why Kanata chose to be with Sōjirō (largely as a joke at his erotic personality's expense), Sōjirō points out that he and his wife simply looked past outwards appearances: Kanata loved Sōjirō despite his otaku tendencies, and Sōjirō obviously did not mind that Kanata had an unusual physique and did not share his hobbies. He also says that one of the few things in life he was and still is absolutely confident in is that no one in the world loved Kanata more than he did.
Kanata Izumi (泉 かなた, Izumi Kanata)
Voiced by: Sumi Shimamoto (anime, PS2 and PSP video game), Rebecca Olkowski (English)
Kanata was Konata Izumi's mother, who was also very short and bore a striking resemblance to Konata (minus Konata's ahoge, the catlike smile and the beauty mark under her left eye). She is described by Konata and Sōjirō Izumi as having a personality straight out of a bishōjo game. She died when Konata was an infant of unspecified causes and her only appearances in the manga are through a single photograph and through Sōjirō's memory. Since she was Sōjirō's childhood friend, Konata has wondered if that was one of the main reasons why her mother married Sōjirō. In the animated version and in the omake for volume six of the manga, Kanata returns to the Izumi residence as a spirit, and walks in on a conversation both Konata and Sōjirō were having about her. She is touched by Sōjirō's kind words that he was the only one who truly loved her as much as he did (she later realized that she too, loved him deeply), and even took a picture with him and Konata together. However, when Sōjirō and Konata look at the photo image in the camera, they are spooked at what appears to be a shadow standing behind them. Konata wants to delete the image, while Sōjirō wants to burn it, thinking that the family will end up cursed if they let it be, but Kanata pleads with them not to delete the picture to no avail, as no one can see or hear her.
Yui Narumi (成実 ゆい, Narumi Yui)
Voiced by: Chiwa Saito (old drama CD, NDS video game), Saori Nishihara (anime, PS2 and PSP video game, new drama CD), Julie Ann Taylor (English)
Yui is Konata Izumi's cousin and Yutaka Kobayakawa's older sister. She is a very easy going female police officer for the Saitama Prefectural Police Department who acts before thinking. She is a bit of a klutz and is a meganekko. However, she has a tendency to exhibit road rage when she is behind the wheel (but, incidentally, shows incredible skill, as a street racer, much in the same vein of Initial D's Takumi Fujiwara). Yui has a well-rounded face, a large forehead, a catlike smile similar to Konata's and straight, short hair. She isn't into fashion that much, and after getting married, Yui left behind her maiden name, Kobayakawa. However, her husband is out of town most of the time during the series, so she frequently visits Konata's house, mainly as a distraction, seeking to play her video games and read her manga. Usually, Yui will come over to Konata's home very late at night while drunk. A running gag in the series is that Nanako Kuroi is oblivious to the fact that Yui is married. She drives a blue Subaru Vivio RX-R in the anime.
Kiyotaka Narumi (成実 きよたか, Narumi Kiyotaka)
Voiced by: Nobuyuki Kobushi (anime), Lex Lang (English)
Kiyotaka is Yui Narumi's husband and Konata Izumi's cousin, by family. He is currently away and his only appearances throughout the series was through a phone conversation with his wife.

==== Hiiragi family ====
Hiiragi family members (from left to right): Kagami, Matsuri, Tadao, Inori, Tsukasa, and Miki.

Tadao Hiiragi (柊 ただお, Hiiragi Tadao)
Voiced by: Tōru Furusawa (anime, new drama CD), Richard Epcar (English)
Tadao is the father of the Hiiragi family and has short black hair. He works as a Shinto kannushi of the Takanomiya Shrine (based on the Washinomiya Shrine). As a parent, he often makes sure that his daughters are doing their school work, and checks on their progress. He is the only one in the Hiiragi family who is male and also right-handed.
Miki Hiiragi (柊 みき, Hiiragi Miki)
Voiced by: Kikuko Inoue (anime, new drama CD), Peggy O'Neal (English)
Miki has long blue violet hair and is the mother of the Hiiragi family. She is able to maintain a trim, young-and-beautiful appearance, despite having given birth to four daughters.
Inori Hiiragi (柊 いのり, Hiiragi Inori)
Voiced by: Nozomi Masu (anime, new drama CD), Bridget Hoffman (English)
Inori has short dark plum-purple hair and is the eldest sister of the Hiiragi sisters. She is a miko at the Takanomiya Shrine.
Matsuri Hiiragi (柊 まつり, Hiiragi Matsuri)
Voiced by: Satomi Akesaka (anime, new drama CD), Dorothy Elias-Fahn (English)
Matsuri has short light brown hair and is the second eldest sister of the Hiiragi sisters, after Inori Hiiragi. She is a college student and a miko at the Takanomiya Shrine. She tends to be less dependable than Inori when helping their younger sisters with school work.

==== Takara family ====
Yukari Takara (高良 ゆかり, Takara Yukari)
Voiced by: Mami Kosuge (anime, PS2 and PSP video game, new drama CD), Bridget Hoffman (English)
Yukari is Miyuki Takara's mother, who tends to be very well-mannered, but can be a bit of a klutz. She is warm and friendly, once talking with a telemarketer for over an hour, and has a mischievous sense of humor. Yukari's hair is short and unlike her daughter, she does not wear eyeglasses. She doesn't like to do household chores, which explains why she isn't very skilled with household items. On one occasion, she thought that a colored candle was a popsicle. Yukari is often mistaken for Miyuki's "big sister", rather than her mother, due to her youthfully cuddly appearance, which, combined with her adorably cheerful personality and endearing clumsiness, has resulted in her being regarded as moe, a trait not common for women in anime in their thirties.

==== Iwasaki family ====
Honoka Iwasaki (岩崎 ほのか, Iwasaki Honoka)
Voiced by: Junko Iwao (anime, PSP video game), Dorothy Elias-Fahn (English)
Honoka is Minami Iwasaki's mother and Yukari Takara's friend.
Cherry (チェリー, Cherī)
Voiced by: Kujira (anime, PSP video game), Derek Stephen Prince (English)
Cherry is Minami Iwasaki family's dog. Her name originates from Kagami Yoshimizu's family dog's name.

== Characters introduced in other Lucky Star media ==
=== Lucky Channel ===
Akira Kogami (小神 あきら, Kogami Akira)
Voiced by: Ai Nonaka (NDS video game and extra drama CD), Hiromi Konno (radio, anime, PS2 and PSP video game, new drama CD, Miyakawa-ke no Kūfuku anime and drama CD), Stephanie Sheh (English)
Akira is a fourteen-year-old junior high school student, who is also the captain of the Lucky Star informational ad section called "Lucky Channel" (らっきー☆ちゃんねる) in the Comptiq magazine. Akira has short salmon pink hair and has an ahoge towards the right side of her head, and has golden yellow eyes. Her arms are so short that the sleeves of her winter school uniform easily cover her hands. Akira tends to be very energetic, and her chief form of greeting is "Hiya, Luckies!", and frequently ends each episode with "Bye-ni!". Ni (二), as in the Japanese number two, and can be written as "Bye^{2}", resulting in a shorter and cuter form of Bye-Bye. The cute persona, however, is a facade; in reality, whenever she is annoyed or feels that her career or popularity is threatened (usually both by her assistant, Minoru Shiraishi), Akira's bright persona is instantaneously shed to reveal a deep voiced, violent, chain-smoking, selfish, cynic of a burnt out entertainer on the brink of becoming a has-been. However, her talents are undeniable; she has been in the entertainment business since the age of three. She can be quite cruel towards Minoru, both physically and emotionally. She has been known to throw all sorts of objects (such as her overflowing ashtray) into his face, particularly whenever he mentions that a girl in the Lucky Star cast is cute. Akira's disturbing and menacing persona may be a tongue in cheek and satirical look at the insecurities of Japanese idols, whose popularity is constantly threatened by the "next cutest thing on the block".
She is the main character of the manga Akira no Ōkoku (Akira's Kingdom), which is still being serialized in magazine Comp Ace published by Kadokawa Shoten. She is called "Kiratchi" (きらっち) by Rinko.
Hikaru Sakuraba (桜庭 ひかる, Sakuraba Hikaru)
Minoru Shiraishi (白石 みのる, Shiraishi Minoru)
Voiced by: Minoru Shiraishi (radio, anime, PS2 and PSP video game, new drama CD), Sam Riegel (English)
Minoru appears in the "Lucky Channel" segment at the end of each Lucky Star episode, but is also a minor recurring character, as a member of Konata Izumi's class. He is the animated version of his voice actor, Minoru Shiraishi, although it is likely that the animated version is only around eighteen years old, due to him being in class 3-B. In the karaoke end credits theme sequence after episode two of the anime, it was revealed that Minoru has a part-time position, working at the karaoke bar Konata and her friends sing at. In the "Lucky Channel" segment, Minoru is Akira Kogami's assistant, who repeatedly gets yelled at (and physically abused) by Akira, if he does or says something not to her liking. Usually, just when he attains enough confidence to speak out and enjoy himself, Akira stops in his tracks, usually insulting him for "being full of himself." Minoru was nicknamed "Sebastian" by Konata one day, because of his likeness to a butler. Since then, the Lucky Star cast and Akira herself has called him this. After a trip to the forests around Mount Fuji to get spring water for Akira, Minoru comes back a dirty and torn-up mess, and was more than likely mauled by a bear during his quest, judging from the claw-marks on his back. Akira dubbed the water as too warm, spat it on the camera lens and then threw the rest in his face. This, after her cocktail of constant physical and mental abuse (not to mention being mauled by a bear for nothing), was the straw that broke the camel's back, causing Minoru to go berserk and destroy the set for "Lucky Channel". During their confrontation in episode twenty-one of the anime, it seems that he has lost his fear of Akira, yelling right back at her and thwarting her desire to perform. In the final episode, with the stage wrecked, they do their last show, only to have yet another argument—she starts singing her song, but he, claiming this is merely a microphone check, cuts her off after only a few seconds. He appears briefly in Lucky Star: Ryōō Gakuen Ōtōsai, the PlayStation 2 game of Lucky Star in a secret scene, where he is shown to trying to find the spring water in Mount Fuji before being mauled.
Nyandarō-kun (にゃんだろうくん, Nyandarō-kun)
Voiced by: Norio Wakamoto (Miyakawa-ke no Kūfuku drama CD)
Nyandarō is a cat puppet, and Akira's partner of the Lucky Star informational ad section called "Super Lucky Channel" (超らっきー☆ちゃんねる, Chō Lucky Channel) late term and "Tera Lucky Channel" (兆らっきー☆ちゃんねる, Tera Lucky Channel) in the Comptiq magazine.
Chihiro Ōgami (大神ちひろ, Ōgami Chihiro)
Chihiro is a nine-year-old primary school student, and Akira's partner of the Lucky Star informational ad section called "Super Lucky Channel Branch School" (超らっきー☆ちゃんねる分校, Chō Lucky Channel Bunkō) late term and "Lucky Studium" (らき☆スタっ!? Lucky☆Studium, Raki Suta!? Lucky Studium) in the Comp Ace magazine.

=== Akira no Ōkoku ===
Akira Kogami (小神 あきら, Kogami Akira)
Madoka Ōhara (大原 まどか, Ōhara Madoka)
Madoka is a girl in Akira's class. She is called "Māchin" (まーちん) by Rinko. She is a tall girl, has short hair, and is shy girl.
Akuru Nakatani (中谷 あくる, Nakatani Akuru)
Akuru is a girl in Akira's class. She is called "Kurucchi" (くるっち) by Rinko and "At-chan" (あっちゃん) by Madoka. She is very cool, and has long black hair.
Rinko Otonashi (音無 りんこ, Otonashi Rinko)
Rinko is a girl in Akira's class. She is called "Rin-chan" (りんちゃん) by Madoka. She is a short girl and is a cheerful troublemaker.

=== Miyakawa-ke no Kūfuku ===
Hinata Miyakawa (宮河 ひなた, Miyakawa Hinata)
Voiced by: Mamiko Noto (NDS video game and extra drama CD), Yukiko Takaguchi (anime, PS2 and PSP video game, new drama CD), Maina Shimagata (Miyakawa-ke no Kūfuku), Kate Higgins (English)
Hinata is a young girl with long salmon pink hair, which she ties just a bit to the left of her forehead with a rabbit clip; she has pink droopy eyes and is a meganekko. She makes a living through a job at a local dōjin shop. However, she remains poor, as all her money is spent on manga and dōjinshi.
Hikage Miyakawa (宮河 ひかげ, Miyakawa Hikage)
Voiced by: Yukari Tamura (NDS video game and extra drama CD), Yui Kano (anime, PS2 and PSP video game, new drama CD), Koto Kawasaki (Miyakawa-ke no Kūfuku), Rebecca Forstadt (English)
Hikage is the younger sister of Hinata Miyakawa and is in the fourth grade; she is the youngest character in Lucky Star. She attends the Sakura-en Public Elementary School, and is in class 4-1. She is not an otaku like her older sister, and as such carries the typical tsundere personality. Hikage lives in poverty because of her older sister and wants to grow up so she can get a job on her own; ironically, though, her dream is to eat meat. It is also because of her poverty caused by her sister that she starts to have distaste over otaku. Hikage likes to play gachapon, shopping, and travelling. Hikage's appearance in the game has her with long light-purple hair; her hairstyle is distinctive, as she thinly braids her hair to the right, and uses that as a ribbon to tie her remaining hair. Her eyes are light blue and are slanted upward. Her appearance is a little different in the anime and manga, as she has short, blue hair instead of long, purple hair.
She is called "Wappī" (わっぴー) by Erika.
Yukina Utsumi (内海 ゆきな, Utsumi Yukina)
Voiced by: Madoka Sowa (Miyakawa-ke no Kūfuku)
Yukina is a girl in Hikage's class. She is called "Ūnya" (うーにゃ) by Erika. She is a very shy girl, and has short hair.
Erika Koike (小池 えりか, Koike Erika)
Voiced by: Kanae Iwasaki (Miyakawa-ke no Kūfuku)
Erika is a girl in Hikage's class. She is called "Eririn" (えりりん) by Hikage and "Eri-chan" (えりちゃん) by Yukina. She wears her hair tied into a ponytail. She is interested in romance.
Daisuke Mizushima (水島 だいすけ, Mizushima Daisuke)
Voiced by: Karin Oda (Miyakawa-ke no Kūfuku)
Daisuke is a boy in Hikage's class. He is called "Dai-chan" (だいちゃん) by Yukina. He has a tsundere personality.
Kazuhiko Ōsawa (大沢 かずひこ, Ōsawa Kazuhiko)
Voiced by: Yoshitsugu Matsuoka (Miyakawa-ke no Kūfuku)
Kazuhiko Osawa is the homeroom teacher for Hikage's class. He is a gentle teacher with glasses, but he does not have to rely on his glasses too often.
Marina Koizumi (小泉 まりな, Koizumi Marina)
Voiced by: Natsumi Yamada (Miyakawa-ke no Kūfuku)
Marina Koizumi is a teacher of Hikage's school. She is Kazuhiko Osawa's colleague. She has long hair and an elusive personality.
