= Emiri Katō =

Japanese voice actress and singer

- 加藤 英美里
- Born: November 26, 1983 (age 42); Fussa, Tokyo, Japan
- Occupations: Voice actress; singer
- Years active: 2004–present
- Agent: Stardust Promotion
- Height: 155 cm (5 ft 1 in)
- Musical career
- Genre: Anime song
- Instrument: Vocals
- Labels: Pony Canyon; Lantis
- Formerly of: Kato Fuku

Emiri Katō (加藤 英美里, Katō Emiri; born November 26, 1983) is a Japanese voice actress and singer. At the 2nd Seiyu Awards, she won Best New Actress with her roles in Powerpuff Girls Z as Momoko Akatsutsumi/Hyper Blossom, Lucky Star as Kagami Hiiragi and Pretty Rhythm: Rainbow Live as Naru Ayase. She also shared a Best Singing Award with the rest of the Lucky Star girls for the theme song "Motteke! Sailor Fuku". At the 6th Seiyu Awards, Katō won Best Supporting Actress with roles such as Kyubey in Puella Magi Madoka Magica, Kiko Kayanuma in Darker than Black, and Mey-Rin in Black Butler. Katō and fellow voice actress Kaori Fukuhara were in a music duo called Kato*Fuku, which sang theme songs for When Supernatural Battles Became Commonplace. Kato*Fuku released three albums from 2012 to 2015, and disbanded in 2016. Katō left 81 Produce in February 2022, and has since transferred to Stardust Promotion.

== Filmography ==
=== Anime ===
List of voice performance work in anime
Year	Title	Role	Notes	Source
2004	Hamtaro	Cactus Brothers		
2004–09	Kyō Kara Maō! series	Doria		
2005–06	Ah! My Goddess series	Woman, girl		
2005	MÄR	Children		
2005	Eureka Seven	Ageha C		
2005	Noein	Schoolgirl		
2006	Fushigiboshi no Futago Hime Gyu!	Chiffon		
2006	Aria the Natural	Pair undine		
2006–08	Taste it! Mimika	Rewinded buffalo		
2006	Makai Senki Disgaea	Archer		
2006	xxxHOLiC	Various characters		
2006	Kirarin Revolution	Kai Kazama		
2006	Sasami: Magical Girls Club series	Sonoko Umetsu		
2006	Tsubasa Chronicle	Woman	Season 2	
2006–07	Demashita! Powerpuff Girls Z	Momoko Akatsutsumi/Hyper Blossom		
2006	Tona-Gura!	Schoolgirl		
2006	Pumpkin Scissors	Maid		
2006	Sumomomo Momomo	Kouji Inuzuka (young)		
2007	Deltora Quest	Girl		
2007	Tokyo Majin series	Kumagayama Yuko, Chibi Longlyn		
2007	GeGeGe no Kitaro	Sachiko	series 5	
2007–09	Hayate the Combat Butler series	Aika Kasumi		
2007	Idolmaster Xenoglossia	Buddha soup		
2007–09	Darker than Black series	Kiko Kayanuma		
2007	Lucky Star	Kagami Hiiragi	Also OVAs and specials	
2007	Treasure Gaust	Bud glue		
2007	Mushi-Uta	Snail スネイル		
2007	Myself; Yourself	Schoolgirl		
2007	Shugo Chara!	Friend		
2008	H2O: Footprints in the Sand	Yukiji Yakumo		
2008	Dazzle	Children		
2008	Ikki	My chan		
2008	Rin -daughters of Mnemosyne -	Teruki Maeno		
2008	Kamen no Maid Guy	Eiko Izumi		
2008	Zettai Karen Children	Kazura		
2008	Soul Eater	Blair		
2008	Telepathy Shōjo Ran	Ran Isozaki		
2008	Scarecrowman	Girl		
2008	Akaneiro ni Somaru Saka	Karen Ayanokouji		
2008–10	Black Butler series	Mey-Rin		
2008	Shugo Chara!! Doki—	Ninagawa Hitomi		
2008	Skip Beat!	Beach		
2009	Slap-up Party: Arad Senki	Mintai		
2009–11	Metal Fight Beyblade series	Kenta Yumiya		
2009	Needless	Disk		
2009–24	Monogatari series	Mayoi Hachikuji		
2009	Princess Lover!	Seika Houjouin		
2009	Yumeiro Patissiere	Natsuki Aragaki		
2009	Whispered Words	Kiyori Torioi		
2010–11	Baka and Test series	Hideyoshi Kinoshita, Yūko Kinoshita		
2010	Ōkami Kakushi	Isuzu Tsumuhana		
2010	Angel Beats!	Shiori Sekine		
2010	Seitokai Yakuindomo	Kaede Igarashi		
2010	Bakuman.	Amy		
2010	Star Driver: Kagayaki no Takuto	Ruri Makina		
2010	And Yet the Town Moves	Eri Isazaki		
2011	Puella Magi Madoka Magica	Kyubey		
2011	Dragon Crisis!	Saphi		
2011	Robocar Poli	Beny, Stacy, cici		
2011	Poco Potteito	Meina		
2011	Happy Kappy	Kappy		
2011	Denpa Onna to Seishun Otoko	Ryūko Mifune		
2011	Maria†Holic: Alive	Miki Miyamae		
2011	Sket Dance	Usagi, Yoshihiko		
2011	It was truly there! Medical media	Eri Nitta, Director of Science Division, Poverty God, Turtle		
2011	Double-J	Arima Sayo		
2011–15	Yuruyuri series	Sakurako Ohmuro		
2011	Ben-To	Ayame Shaga		
2011	Un-Go	Kumi Tsunemi		
2011	Tayo The Little Bus	Carry, Rubby		
2012	Medaka Box series	Hansode Shiranui		
2012	Sankarea	Maid Akino		
2012	Tsuritama	Koko		
2012	The Ambition of Oda Nobuna	Nobukatsu Oda (Nobu Tsuda)		
2012	Busou Shinki	Clara		
2013	Senyū series	Hime-chan, Sun		
2013	Haganai NEXT	Kate Takayama		
2013–14	Pretty Rhythm: Rainbow Live	Naru Ayase		
2013	Hayate the Combat Butler: Cuties	Kasumi Ai Uta		
2013	Yuyushiki	Okano's younger brother		
2013–16	Fate/kaleid liner Prisma Illya series	Tatsuko Gakumazawa		
2013–15	Tamagotchi! series	Miraitchi	Starting from Miracle Friends	
2013–21	Log Horizon series	Akatsuki		
2013	Voice Torm 7	Voice Five (Gomono Yu)		
2013	Pokémon Mewtwo: Prologue to Awakening	Anna	TV special	
2014	Seitokai Yakuindomo*	Kaede Igarashi		
2014	D-Frag!	Noe Kazama		
2014	Hamatora	Hajime		
2014	No-Rin	Wakana		
2014	Wake Up, Girls!	Mai Kondō		
2014	Sgt. Frog	Tomosu Hinohara		
2014	Pretty Rhythm: All-Star Selection	Naru Ayase		
2014	The World Is Still Beautiful	Riesa		
2014	Re: Hamatora	Hajime		
2014	Momo Kyun Sword	Totetsu		
2014	Black Butler: Book of Circus	Mey-Rin	Also Book of Murder OVA	
2014	The Seven Deadly Sins	Luigi		
2014	When Supernatural Battles Became Commonplace	Madoka Kuki	Ending theme song with Kaori Fukuhara	
2014	Nari Hiro www なりヒロwww	DP (Stray cat)		
2014	Girl Friend Beta	Rinno Suzuka		
2014	Tayo the Little Bus	Dongwoo		
2015–present	Overlord series	Aura Bella Fiore		
2015	School-Live!	Taromaru		
2015	Seraph of the End	Yayoi Endo		
2016	Schwarzesmarken	Pham Thi Lan		
2016	Hundred	Chris Steinbert		
2016	Kamiwaza Wanda	Terara		
2016	Active Raid	Yuria	Phase 2	
2016	Eyedrops	Vitamin B12		
2016	Kaiju Girls	Zetton		
2016	Tayo the Little Bus	Peanut		
2017–21	Miss Kobayashi's Dragon Maid	Riko Saikawa		
2017–19	Granblue Fantasy The Animation series	Sierokarte		
2017	Rin-ne	Kuroboshi III	Season 3	
2017	Fate/Apocrypha	Roche Frain Yggdmillennia		
2017	Battle Girl High School	Michelle Watagi		
2017	Duel Masters (2017)	Rekuta Kadoko	Replacing Yuka Imai, who retired from the industry	
2018–21	Kiratto Pri Chan	Naru Shiawase, Naru Ayase	Second and third seasons and Also (ep 118)	
2018–present	BanG Dream!	Himari Uehara	Second and third seasons and Girls Band Party! Pico spin-off	
2019	Isekai Quartet	Aura Bella Fiore		
2020–21	Magia Record: Puella Magi Madoka Magica Side Story	Kyubey, Little Kyubey, Uwasa-san		
2020	Kakushigoto	Nadila		
2021	Duel Masters King!	Rekuta Kadoko		
2022	Girls' Frontline	ST AR-15		
2022	Spy × Family	Becky Blackbell		
2022	Hanabi-chan Is Often Late	Kojiro		
2022	Delicious Party Pretty Cure	Hanna Tatemoto/Tatemotte		
2025	Medalist	Hitomi Takamine		
2026	Champignon Witch	Minos		
2026–27	Star Detective Precure!	Pochitan		
2026	Gals Can't Be Kind to Otaku!?	Hibiki Ijichi		
2026	Magic Knight Rayearth	Presea		
2026	Magic Repo Man	Empee		

=== Film ===
List of voice performance work in film
Year	Title	Role	Notes	Source
2011	Detective Conan: Quarter of Silence	Kaori Chigusa		
2012	Puka Puka Juju	Micah	Anime Mirai short film	
2012	Moe Can Change!	Tomoe Kiyatake	OVA based on the mobile game	
2012	Puella Magi Madoka Magica: The Movie	Kyubey	2-part theatrical release	
2013	Puella Magi Madoka Magica: The Story of the Rebellion	Kyubey		
2014	Pretty Rhythm All-Star Selection: Prism Show☆Best Ten	Naru Ayase		
2015	PriPara the Movie: Everyone, Assemble! Prism ☆ Tours	Naru Ayase		
2015	Wake Up, Girls! Beyond the Bottom	Mai Kondō		
2015	Madoka Magica concept movie	Kyubey	concept movie for Shaft's 40th anniversary	
2017	Black Butler: Book of the Atlantic	Mey-Rin		
2017	Seitokai Yakuindomo: The Movie	Kaede Igarashi		
2019	BanG Dream! Film Live	Himari Uehara		
2021	BanG Dream! Film Live 2nd Stage	Himari Uehara		
2025	Miss Kobayashi's Dragon Maid: A Lonely Dragon Wants to Be Loved	Riko Saikawa		
2026	Star Detective Precure! The Movie: The Mysterious Garden and a Secret Pair	Pochitan		

=== Video games ===
List of voice performance work in video games
Year	Title	Role	Notes	Source
2004	Atelier Iris: Eternal Mana	Nymph	PS2	
2008–10	Lucky Star games	Kagami Hiiragi	PS2	
2008	Final Approach 2: 1st Priority	Kazuari Kataoka	PS2, also Portable (PSP) in 2009	
2008	Luminous Arc 2	Althea	NDS	
2008–09	Akaneiro ni Somaru Saka	Karen Ayanokouji	PS2, PSP	
2008–09	Elsword	Laby	PC	
2009	Shining Force Feather	Pipin	DS	
2009–10	11eyes CrossOver	Mio Kouno	Xbox 360	
2009	Arc Rise Fantasia	Adele Neva Linna	Wii	
2009	Ōkami Kakushi	Isuzu Tsumuhana	PSP	
2009	Rune Factory 3	Raven	DS	
2009	Tokimeki Memorial 4	Itsuki Maeda	PSP	
2010	Tatsunoko vs. Capcom: Ultimate All-Stars	Yatterman-2	Wii	
2010	No Fate! Only the Power of Will	Takayama Mabel	PSP	
2010–16	Quiz Magic Academy series	Maya	Arcade, Starting with Quiz Magic Academy 7	
2010	Chaos;Head Love Chu Chu!	Erin-fray Orgel	Xbox 360, Love Chu Chu original character, Also PSP in 2011 and Dual in 2014	
2010	Ikki Tousen XROSS IMPACT	Ato	PSP	
2011	Harem Ace 2	Amaretti	Pachislot	
2011	Tsukumonogatari	Kutabe	PSP	
2011	El Shaddai: Ascension of the Metatron	Nanna	PS3, Xbox 360	
2011	Gloria Union	Pinger	PSP	
2011	CR Sengoku Otome 2	Otomo Soulin	Pachinko game, voice actors differ from anime series	
2011	Sakahari Portable	Kira Rin	PSP, Also 2016 version	
2012	Puella Magi Madoka Magica Portable	Kyubey	PSP	
2012	Mugen Souls	Shampuru	PS3	
2012	Little King's Story	Amaville	Other	
2012	Conception: Ore no Kodomo o Undekure!	Mahiru Konatsuki	PSP	
2012	Rune Factory 4	Raven	DS	
2012	Bakemonogatari Portable	Mayoi Hachikuji	PSP	
2012	Girl Friend Beta	Rinno Suzuka	Other	
2012	Baka to Test to Shokanju Portable	Hideyoshi Kinoshita, Yuko Kinoshita	PSP	
2013	Love ☆ Toray – Bitter ~	Miki Sanjo	Xbox 360	
2013	Princess Arthur	Elaine	PSP	
2013	Miyakawa-ke no Kuufuku	Kagami Hiiragi	Lucky Star spin-off	
2013	God Eater 2	Nana Kazuki	PSP, PS Vita	
2013	Puella Magi Madoka Magica: The Battle Pentagram	Kyubey	PS Vita	
2014	Granblue Fantasy	Abby, Sierokarte, Halluel, Malluel	Mobile / Browser / PC	
2014	Hamatora: Look at Smoking World	Hajime	DS	
2014	Oreshika: Tainted Bloodlines	Tazuru Hime	Other	
2014	Lord of Magna: Maiden Heaven	Salina	DS	
2014	Dance of the battlefield	Collet	Other	
2015	Battle Girl High School	Michelle Watagi	Mobile	
2015	Return to PoPoLoCRoIS: A STORY OF SEASONS Fairytale	Claudia	DS	
2015	Angel Beats! 1st beat	Shiori Sekine	PC	
2015	Moero Crystal	Montmo	Other	
2015	7th Dragon III Code: VFD	Character voice	DS	
2015	Project X Zone 2	Nana Kazuki	N3DS	
2015	Owari no Seraph: Unmei no Hajimari	Yayoi Endo	PS Vita	
2016	Koyomimonogatari	Mayoi Hachikuji	Other	
2016	Overwatch	Tracer	PC	
2016	Ace Attorney 6	Bokuto Tsuani	DS	
2016	Sengoku Otome: Battle Legend	Otomo Soulin	Other	
2016	Girls' Frontline	ST AR-15, M37, Type 59	Mobile, PC	
2017	Dissidia Final Fantasy: Opera Omnia	Lilisette	Mobile	
2017	BanG Dream: Girls Band Party!	Himari Uehara	Other	
2017	Magia Record	Kyubey, Little Kyubey, Uwasa-san, Mayoi Hachikuji	Other	
2018	Revue Starlight -Re LIVE-	Tsukasa Ebisu	Mobile	
2018	Bombergirl	Urushi	Arcade, PC	
2019	Da Capo 4	Sorane Ōmi	PC	
2022	Blue Archive	Kaede Isami	Mobile	
2023	Honkai: Star Rail	Bailu	Mobile, PC, PS4, PS5	
2024	Puyo Puyo Quest	Kyubey	Mobile	

=== Tokusatsu ===
List of voice performance work in tokusatsu
Year	Title	Role	Notes	Source
2012	Kaizoku Sentai Gokaiger vs. Space Sheriff Gavan: The Movie	Sneak Brother Sister	Movie	

=== Dubbing ===
- My Little Pony: Friendship is Magic (2013), Fluttershy
- Barbie and the Magic of Pegasus (2005), Rose
- Pinky Dinky Doo (2006), Pinky
- My Little Pony: Equestria Girls (2015), Fluttershy
- My Little Pony: Equestria Girls – Rainbow Rocks (2015), Fluttershy
- My Little Pony: Equestria Girls – Friendship Games (2016), Fluttershy
- My Little Pony: Equestria Girls – Legend of Everfree (2017), Fluttershy
- My Little Pony: Equestria Girls (2017 television specials) (2017), Fluttershy
- My Little Pony: Equestria Girls (Digital Series) (2017), Fluttershy
- My Little Pony: The Movie (2018), Fluttershy
- Lego Monkie Kid (2021), MK
- Mechamato (2022), Mara

=== Live action ===
List of acting performances in film and television
Year	Title	Role	Notes	Source
2011	Ad Lib Anime Kenkyūsho	Chief Research No. 001	live-action show where she and Kaori Fukuhara ad-lib voice parts that are later made into an anime	

== Discography ==
=== Albums ===
List of albums, with selected chart positions
Title	Album information	Oricon
Title	Album information	Peak position
vivid	Released: 17 December 2008; Label: Pony Canyon; Catalog No.: PCCA-02814	87
One girl	Released: 2 September 2009; Label: Pony Canyon; Catalog No.: PCCA-02993	132
Jump!	Released: 6 October 2010; Label: Pony Canyon; Catalog No.: PCCA-03272	92
My Favorite Songs	Released: 11 January 2012; Label: Pony Canyon; Catalog No.: PCCA-03506	51

=== Singles ===
List of singles, with selected chart positions
Title	Album information	Oricon
Title	Album information	Peak position
"Egao no Katachi / fuwafuwa" (笑顔のかたち/ふわふわ)	Released: 3 February 2010; Label: Pony Canyon; Catalog No.: PCCA-03092	85
"update"	Released: 19 August 2009; Label: Pony Canyon; Catalog No.: PCCA-70253	100

=== Character albums ===
List of character albums, with selected chart positions
Title	Album information	Oricon
Title	Album information	Peak position
Lucky Star Character Song Vol. 2: Kagami Hiiragi (Emiri Kato); Kagami Hiiragi (Emiri Kato) from the Lucky Star series	Released: 5 September 2007; Label: Lantis; Catalog No.: LACM-4405	9
TV anime "Akaneiro ni Somaru Saka" Ending Theme Character Song Series: Karen Ayanokouji (Emiri Kato); Karen Ayanokouji (Emiri Kato) from the Akaneiro ni Somaru Saka series	Released: 26 November 2008; Label: Catalog No.: LACM-4545	123
Washi to Bokura to Renaijutsu; Hideyoshi Kinoshita (Emiri Kato) from Baka to Test to Shōkanjū	Released: 26 October 2011; Label: Catalog No.: LACA-15146	264
Washi to Song to Engekidamashii; Hideyoshi Kinoshita (Emiri Kato) from Baka to Test to Shōkanjū	Released: 26 May 2010; Label: Catalog No.: LACM-4725	47
Yuru Yuri no uta shirīzu ♪ 05 kirai janai mon (uta: Ōmuro Sakurako/ CV: Katō emiri); YuruYuri song series 05: kirai janai mon Sakurako Ohmuro (Emiri Kato) from YuruYuri	Released: 21 September 2011; Label: Catalog No.: PCCG-70125	27
Yuru Yuri ♪♪ mi ~yu ~ji kku 07 `kira ippai × suki-ippai' Sakurako Ohmuro (Emiri Kato) from YuruYuri ♪♪	Released: 19 September 2012; Label: Catalog No.: PCCG-70147	17
Yuru Yuri uta ♪ soro! 07 `Sakurako ☆ in torode ~yu ̄ su'/ Ōmuro Sakurako (CV. Katō emiri); Sakurako Ohmuro (Emiri Kato) from YuruYuri	Released: 16 December 2015; Label: Catalog No.: PCCG-70285	55

=== Drama CD and audio recordings ===
List of voice performance work in audio recordings
Year	Title	Role	Notes	Source
2006	Venus Versus Virus	Kyoko 京子		
2008	Lucky Star Drama CD (Drama Complete Disk)	Kagami Hiiragi		
2009	Ebiten: Kōritsu Ebisugawa Kōkō Tenmonbu	Izumiko Todayama		
2009	Akaneiro ni Somaru Saka Original Drama	Karen Ayanokōji		
2010	Akarui San-Shimai Project		Web radio program	
2011	Hime Koi Drama CD	Nadeshiko		
2012	Shurabara! しゅらばら!	Hoshikawa Hayatama 星川早少女		
2012	No-Rin	Wakana 若旦那		
2015	Over Lord	Aura Bella Fiore		

=== with Kato*Fuku ===
==== Kato*Fuku albums ====
List of Kato*Fuku albums, with selected chart positions
Title	Album information	Oricon
Title	Album information	Peak position
Ya (^-^) (やぁ(^-^)/)	Released: 26 December 2012; Label: Dive II Entertainment; Catalog No.: AVCA-49956/B	85
with	Released: 29 January 2014; Label: Dive II Entertainment; Catalog No.: AVCA-74121/B	59
Wonder Tale; Wonder Tale～スマイルとハピネスと不思議な本～ "Wonder Tale – Smile and Happiness and Magical Book"	Released: 25 November 2015; Label: Dive II Entertainment; Catalog No.: EYCA-10650	148

==== Kato*Fuku singles ====
List of Kato*Fuku singles, with selected chart positions
Title	Album information	Oricon
Title	Album information	Peak position
"Wonderfuler"	Released: 8 February 2012; Label: Dive II Entertainment; Catalog No.: AVCA-49116/B	103
"Appare! Shunkan sekkyoku-zai" あっぱれ!瞬間積極剤	Released: 8 February 2012; Label: Dive II Entertainment; Catalog No.: AVCA-49117/B	98
"You Gotta Love Me!"	Released: 19 November 2014; Label: Dive II Entertainment; Catalog No.: EYCA-10075/B	47
