= Wendee Lee =

American voice actress (active 1981–present)

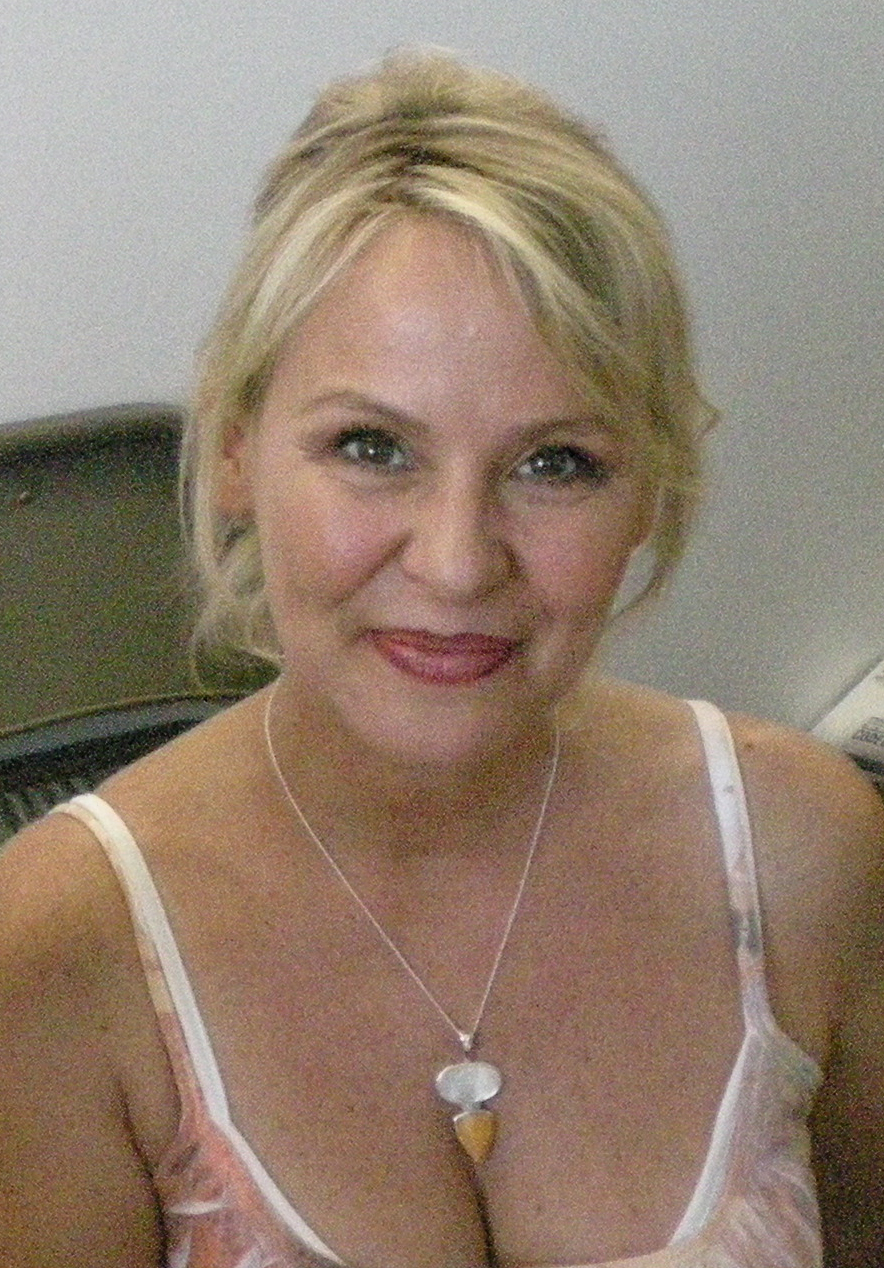
- Wendee Lee in 2008
- Other names: Wendee Swan; Wendee Day; Elyse Floyd
- Occupations: Voice actress; director; writer
- Years active: 1981–present

Wendee Lee is an American voice actress, writer, and director.

== Early life ==
Lee studied dance and theater and later became a full-time dancer in her teens. According to her interview on the Magic Knight Rayearth DVDs, she started doing voices at school and got in trouble for it.

== Career ==
Lee's first anime voice role was in Harmony Gold production Robotech in the 1980s, where she voiced Vanessa Leeds, one of the operators aboard the SDF-1 Macross. She also worked with Streamline on several anime productions including Dragon Ball. She would continue dance and work part-time as a make-up artist, choreographer, and dance instruction.

Lee's major voice roles in anime include Kei in the Pioneer dub of Akira, Faye Valentine on Cowboy Bebop, Myōjin Yahiko in Rurouni Kenshin, Takeru "T.K." Takaishi on Digimon Adventure, Haruhi Suzumiya on The Melancholy of Haruhi Suzumiya and Konata Izumi on Lucky Star. She has also worked as an ADR director on Bleach, Love Hina and Outlaw Star and a casting director on The Night B4 Christmas. In 2014–2015, she voiced Queen Serenity in the Viz Media re-dub of the classic Sailor Moon series and the new Sailor Moon Crystal series.

In 2023, Lee was embroiled in controversy after a decision by Viz Media and Studiopolis to not move forward with Anairis Quiñones as Yoruichi Shihōin, with the role in Bleach being reprised by Lee.

== In popular culture ==
Professional wrestler AJ Mendez adopted the latter part of her ring name in honor of Lee.

== Filmography ==
=== Anime ===
List of English dubbing performances in anime
Year	Series	Role	Crew role, notes	Source
1981	The Swiss Family Robinson: Flone of the Mysterious Island	Anna		CA
1985	Robotech	Vanessa Leeds	Macross Saga	Press
1988	Little Women	Sallie Gardiner, Patty		CA
1989	Dragon Ball	Bulma	As Wendee Swan	CA
1990	Zillion	Amy		CA
1991	Zillion: Burning Night	Amy		CA
1992	Nadia: The Secret of Blue Water	Nadia	Streamline dub	
1992	Fight! Iczer One	Iczer One	As Wendee Swan	CA
1993	Doomed Megalopolis	Yukiko Tatsumiya		CA
1994	Moldiver	Agent Elizabeth	As Wendee Day; OVA	CA
1994	Dirty Pair OVAs	Yuri	Streamline Pictures dub "Flight 005 Conspiracy", "Project Eden", "Affair of Nolandia", short	
1995	Phantom Quest Corp	Ayaka Kisaragi	As Wendee Day; OVA	CA
1995	El-Hazard	Various characters	OVA	CA
1997	Super Pig	Penny Round	ADR voice director and script writer	
1998	Fushigi Yûgi	Yui Hongo		CA
1998	Battle Athletes	Tomoe Mido	OVA	CA
1999	Tenchi in Tokyo	Kiyone		CA
1999	Cowboy Bebop	Faye Valentine		Press
1999–2003	Digimon: Digital Monsters	T.K. Takaishi, Mako, Jaarin Wong, Swanmon others	ADR voice director and script writer on Digimon Adventure	Press
2000	Brigadoon: Marin to Melan	Marin Asagi, Lolo, others		CA
2001	Outlaw Star	Twilight Suzuka, others	ADR voice director	CA
2001	Rurouni Kenshin	Myōjin Yahiko, Komagata Yumi	as Elyse Floyd	CA
2001	Magic Knight Rayearth	Umi Ryuuzaki, Princess Emeraude	Also Rayearth 2	CA
2001	Mobile Suit Gundam 0080: War in the Pocket	Chris		
2001–02	Mon Colle Knights	Batch, Ms. Loon, Lovestar		
2001–03	The Big O	Angel, others		CA
2002	Adventures of Mini-Goddess	Urd		
2002	Love Hina	Kaolla Su, Tama-chan	Also Specials "Love Hina Again", "Christmas Special", "Spring Special"; ADR voice director and script writer	
2002	Kurogane Communication	Trigger, Angela, Lillith	ADR voice director and script writer	CA
2002	Shinzo	Queen Rusephine, others	Also script writer	
2002	Samurai Girl: Real Bout High School	Ryoko Mitsurugi		
2002	Ys	Sarah Toba		
2003	Wild Arms: Twilight Venom	Loretta Oratorio	ADR voice director and script writer	
2003	Ai Yori Aoshi	Tina Foster, others		
2003	.hack//Sign	BlackRose		
2003	Chobits	Takako Shimizu		
2003	Great Teacher Onizuka	Azusa Fuyutsuki, others		
2003	Ys II: Castle in the Heavens	Maria Messe, Tarf Hadal		
2003	Omishi Magical Theater: Risky Safety	Lani, Moe's Mother	Also voice ADR director and script writer	
2003	Mao-chan	Yuriko Ozora	ADR voice director and script writer	
2004	Marmalade Boy	Rumi Koishikawa, Chigusa, others		
2004	Stellvia of the Universe	Chiaki Katase	ADR voice director and script writer	
2004	Witch Hunter Robin	Miho Karasuma		
2004–14	Ikki Tousen series	Goei	Series Battle Vixens, Great Guardians, Xtreme Xecutor	
2005	Scrapped Princess	Senes Giat, Diana		
2005	Planetes	Fee Carmichael		
2005	Grenadier	Rushuna Tendo	ADR director and ADR writer	
2005	Tenchi Muyo! Ryo-Ohki	Little Girl Kagato, Kiyone Masaki	OVA3	CA
2005	DearS	Mitsuka Yoshimine		
2005–09	Naruto	Moegi, Neji Hyuga (young), Tsubaki, others	Also related specials and movies	
2006	Boys Be...	Jyunna Morio	Ep. 11	
2006–07	Haré+Guu	Weda		
2006–14	Bleach	Yoruichi Shihōin, Tatsuki Arisawa, Ururu Tsumugiya, others	ADR voice director	
2007	The Melancholy of Haruhi Suzumiya	Haruhi Suzumiya		
2007	MÄR	Dorothy		
2008	Lucky Star	Konata Izumi, Haruhi Suzumiya (cameo)		
2009–17	Naruto: Shippuden	Moegi, Yugito Nii, Yugao Uzuki, others		
2012	Persona 4: The Animation	Sayoko Uehara		
2012–present	Blue Exorcist	Shura Kirigakure, Rin Okumura (child), Supermarket Manager (Ep. 1)		
2013	Nura: Rise of the Yokai Clan: Demon Capital	Saori Maki, Natto-Kozo, Keijoro		
2013	Fate/Zero	Natalia Kaminski		
2014	Blood Lad	Neyn		
2014–15	Knights of Sidonia	Captain Kobayashi		
2014–15	Doraemon	Sue's Mom, others	ADR voice director	
2014–15	Sailor Moon	Queen Serenity, DD Girls	Viz Media dub	
2015	JoJo's Bizarre Adventure	Lisa Lisa		
2015	Mobile Suit Gundam: The Origin	Kycilla Zabi		
2015	The Disappearance of Nagato Yuki-chan	Haruhi Suzumiya		
2015	Hyperdimension Neptunia: The Animation	Blanc	First role recorded at Funimation/OkraTron 5000	
2015	BlazBlue: Alter Memory	Takamagahara		
2015	A Lull in the Sea	Akira Shiodome, Tsumugu's mother	ADR voice director	
2015–16	Durarara!!×2	Kasane Kujiragi		
2015–17	Sailor Moon Crystal	Queen Serenity	Viz Media dub	
2016	Your Lie in April	Saki Arima		
2016	March Comes In like a Lion	Misaki, Young Rei Kiriyama	Also director	
2016–18	Mobile Suit Gundam: Iron-Blooded Orphans	Amida Arca		
2017	Dragon Ball Super	Bulma	Bang Zoom! dub for Toonami Asia	
2017	Berserk	Luca	2016 series	
2018	Beyblade Burst Turbo	Koji Konda		
2019	One-Punch Man	Do-S		
2019–23	Boruto: Naruto Next Generations	Moegi		Tweet
2021	Cells at Work! Code Black		ADR director	
2021	Adachi and Shimamura	Adachi's Mom		
2021	Vivy: Fluorite Eye's Song	Archive	ADR director	
2021	Kageki Shojo!!	Aika Shion		
2021	Maesetsu! Opening Act	Ms. Hirano		
2021	Yashahime: Princess Half-Demon	Joka	Viz Media dub	
2022	Bastard!! Heavy Metal, Dark Fantasy	Arshes Nei, Baba (season 1)		
2022	Bleach: Thousand-Year Blood War	Tatsuki Arisawa, Menoly Mallia, and Yoruichi Shihōin		

=== Animation ===
List of voice performances in animation
Year	Series	Role	Notes	Source
1989–90	Wisdom of the Gnomes	Bruna		
1999–present	Family Guy	Various		
2004–05	Megas XLR	Kiva Andru, others		
2009	Superman: Red Son	Wonder Woman	Motion comic	
2015	Ever After High	Lizzie Hearts	Netflix series Ep. Spring Unsprung	
2015	Popples	Sunny		
2021	High Guardian Spice	Angie		
2021	Heaven Official's Blessing	Ling Wen	Chinese donghua English dub	

=== Feature films ===
List of English dubbing performances in feature films
Year	Title	Role	Notes	Source
1990	Kiki's Delivery Service	Senior Witch, others	Streamline dub	CA
1993	Ninja Scroll	Kagero		
1999	Perfect Blue	Rumi		
2000	Digimon: The Movie	Young TK, Little Girl 1, Party Girl 1, Kokomon		CA
2001	Akira	Kei	Pioneer/Animaze dub	
2001	Vampire Hunter D: Bloodlust	Charlotte Elbourne		
2001	Sakura Wars: The Movie	Sakura Shinguji		CA
2002	Cowboy Bebop: The Movie	Faye Valentine		
2009	Twice as Dead	Alice		
2011	The Disappearance of Haruhi Suzumiya	Haruhi Suzumiya		
2013	Blue Exorcist: The Movie	Shura Kirigakure, Rin Okumura (Young)	Limited theatrical release	
2015	The Laws of the Universe Part 0		Voice Director; Limited theatrical release	
2016	Kingsglaive: Final Fantasy XV	Sylva Via Fleuret	Limited theatrical release	
2018	Cinderella and the Secret Prince	Witch		
2020	NiNoKuni	Evermore Knight	Also English dubbing director	
2021	Case Closed: The Fist of Blue Sapphire	Conan Edogawa		
2021	Violet Evergarden: The Movie	Clara Magnolia		
2021	Sailor Moon Eternal Part 2	Queen Serenity		
2021	Stand by Me Doraemon 2	Nurse	Also English dubbing director	
2022	Belle	Nakai		

=== Direct-to-video and television films ===
List of English dubbing performances in direct-to-video and television animated films
Year	Title	Role	Notes	Source
1985	Codename: Robotech	Vanessa Leeds	Pilot episode for the Robotech series	
1986	Robotech: The Untold Story	Stacy Embrey		
1992	Silent Möbius	Nami Yamigumo	Streamline dub	CA
1998	Tenchi Muyo! Daughter of Darkness	Kiyone		
1999	Tenchi Forever! The Movie	Kiyone		
2003	Cardcaptor Sakura The Movie 2: The Sealed Card	Kero (small form), Sonomi Daidouji		
2004	Kangaroo Jack: G'Day U.S.A.!	Limo Girl		
2005	Digimon: Island of Lost Digimon	Bearmon		
2006	Arthur's Missing Pal	Prunella, Mary Moo Cow		
2008	Bleach: Memories of Nobody	Benin, Jinta Hanakari	Also voice director	
2009	Bleach: The DiamondDust Rebellion	Ururu Tsumugiya, Yoruichi Shihouin	Also voice director	
2011	The Disappearance of Haruhi Suzumiya	Haruhi Suzumiya		
2011	Bleach: Fade to Black	Yoruichi Shihouin		
2012	Little Big Panda	Mrs. Cheng		
2012	Lego Friends	Aunt Sophie	New Girl in Town	
2012	Resident Evil: Damnation	Svetlana Belikova		
2012	Bleach: The Hell Verse	Tatsuki Arisawa		
2012	The Snow Queen	Shopkeeper, Flower Lady; Daughter, Lapp Woman, Irma		
2015	Expelled from Paradise	Angela Balzac		
2015	Monster High: Boo York, Boo York	Nefera de Nile		
2015	The Nutcracker Sweet	Mother, Princess Marmalade, Mice		
2016	The Adventures of Panda Warrior	Bobby Bunny, Princess Angelica	Also English voice director and ADR script writer	
2017	Air Bound	Theresa	Also English voice director and ADR script writer	
2022	The Seven Deadly Sins: Grudge of Edinburgh Part 1	Mage		
2024	Digimon Adventure	T.K. Takaishi (Young)		
2024	Digimon Adventure: Our War Game!	T.K. Takaishi (Young), Noriko (Party Girl 1), Girl 2A		
2024	Digimon Adventure 02: Digimon Hurricane Touchdown!! / Transcendent Evolution! The Golden Digimentals	Kokomon, T.K. Takaishi (Young)		

=== Live-action ===
List of voice performances in live-action television and film
Year	Title	Role	Notes	Source
1993–95	Mighty Morphin Power Rangers	Scorpina (voice)	As Wendee Swan	
1998	Power Rangers in Space	Alpha 6		
1998	Run Lola Run	Lola		
1999	Power Rangers Lost Galaxy	Alpha 6		
2004	Alive!	Yurika Saegusa		

=== Video games ===
List of English dubbing performances in video games
Year	Title	Role	Notes	Source
1999	Heroes of Might and Magic III	Queen Catherine of Erathia		
2000	Gundam Side Story 0079: Rise from the Ashes	Anita Julianne		
2000	Vampire Hunter D	Charlotte Elbourne, Little Carmila		
2001	Fear Effect 2: Retro Helix	Hana		
2001	The Bouncer	Leann Caldwell		
2001	Phase Paradox	Additional voices		
2002	Digimon Rumble Arena	Young TK		
2002	Alpine Racer 3	Ling Yufen		
2002	Neverwinter Nights	Aribeth de Tylmarande		
2002	Soulcalibur II	Chai Xianghua		
2003	.hack//Infection	BlackRose		
2003	.hack//Mutation	BlackRose		
2003	.hack//Outbreak	BlackRose		
2004	.hack//Quarantine	BlackRose		
2005	Wild Arms 4	Raquel Applegate		
2005	Tales of Legendia		Director	
2006	Dirge of Cerberus: Final Fantasy VII	Incidental characters		
2006	Xenosaga Episode III: Also sprach Zarathustra	Nigredo	Also voice over director and script writer	
2006	Tales of the Abyss		Voice director	
2006	.hack//G.U. vol.1//Rebirth	Zelkova		
2006	Wild Arms 5	Rebecca Streisand		
2007	Rogue Galaxy	Queen Freidias, Mother Rune	Also voice director	
2007	.hack//G.U. vol.2//Reminisce	Zelkova		
2007	.hack//G.U. vol.3//Redemption	Zelkova, miscellaneous voices		
2008	Tales of Symphonia: Dawn of the New World		Director	
2008	World of Warcraft	Alexstrasza		
2009	Klonoa	Karal, Moon Queen		
2009	MagnaCarta 2	Melissa Tiss		
2011	Dead or Alive: Dimensions	Ayane		
2012	Tales of Graces f	Young Richard		
2012	Ninja Gaiden 3	Sanji		
2013	Hyperdimension Neptunia Victory	Blanc/White Heart	Uncredited (Note: This title does not list English voice actor credits)	
2013	Fire Emblem Awakening	Avatars		
2013	Naruto Shippuden: Ultimate Ninja Storm 3	Yugito Ni'i		
2013	Killer Is Dead	Alice, Koharu		
2013	Rune Factory 4	Ventuswill	Also Special	
2013	Phoenix Wright: Ace Attorney – Dual Destinies	Athena Cykes		
2014	Danganronpa 2: Goodbye Despair	Akane Owari		
2014	Hyperdimension Neptunia: Producing Perfection	Blanc / White Heart	Uncredited	
2014	Hyperdimension Neptunia Re;Birth1	Blanc / White Heart	Uncredited	
2015	Hyperdimension Neptunia Re;Birth2 Sisters Generation	Blanc / White Heart	Uncredited	
2015	Xenoblade Chronicles X	Additional voices		
2016	Phoenix Wright: Ace Attorney − Spirit of Justice	Athena Cykes	Also voice director	
2017	Danganronpa V3: Killing Harmony	Miu Iruma	Also voice director	
2017	Nier: Automata	Additional voices	Also voice director	
2017	Fire Emblem Heroes	Veronica, Lyn, Sophia, Maria		
2017	.hack//G.U. Last Recode	Zelkova		
2018	Detective Pikachu	Dorothy Fisher, Louise Mulligan		
2018	Dragalia Lost	Veronica		
2019	Devil May Cry 5	Trish, Eva		
2019	Daemon X Machina	Drake		
2019	Shenmue III	Ye Xiuyu, Chen YuQing, Additional Cast		
2020	Final Fantasy VII Remake	Additional Voices		
2021	Nier Replicant ver.1.22474487139...	Gepetto, Hook	Also voice director	
2022	Skullgirls	Black Dhalia, Sekhmet		
2023	Fire Emblem Engage	Lyn, Veronica		
2023	Trinity Trigger	Additional voices		
2023	Detective Pikachu Returns	Additional voices		
2024	Persona 3 Reload	Ms. Terauchi		
2024	Puyo Puyo Puzzle Pop	Accord, Draco Centauros		
2024	Sand Land	Additional voices		
2026	Mega Man Star Force Legacy Collection	Sonia Strumm		
2027	Danganronpa 2×2	Akane Owari		

=== Documentaries ===
List of appearances in documentaries
Year	Series	Role	Notes	Source
2008	Adventures in Voice Acting	Herself		

== Bibliography ==
- Mendez Brooks, AJ (April 4, 2017). Crazy Is My Superpower: How I Triumphed by Breaking Bones, Breaking Hearts, and Breaking the Rules. Crown Archetype. ISBN 978-0451496669.
