= Kyoei Gakuen Junior College =

Coordinates: 35°59′47.4″N 139°43′22.2″E

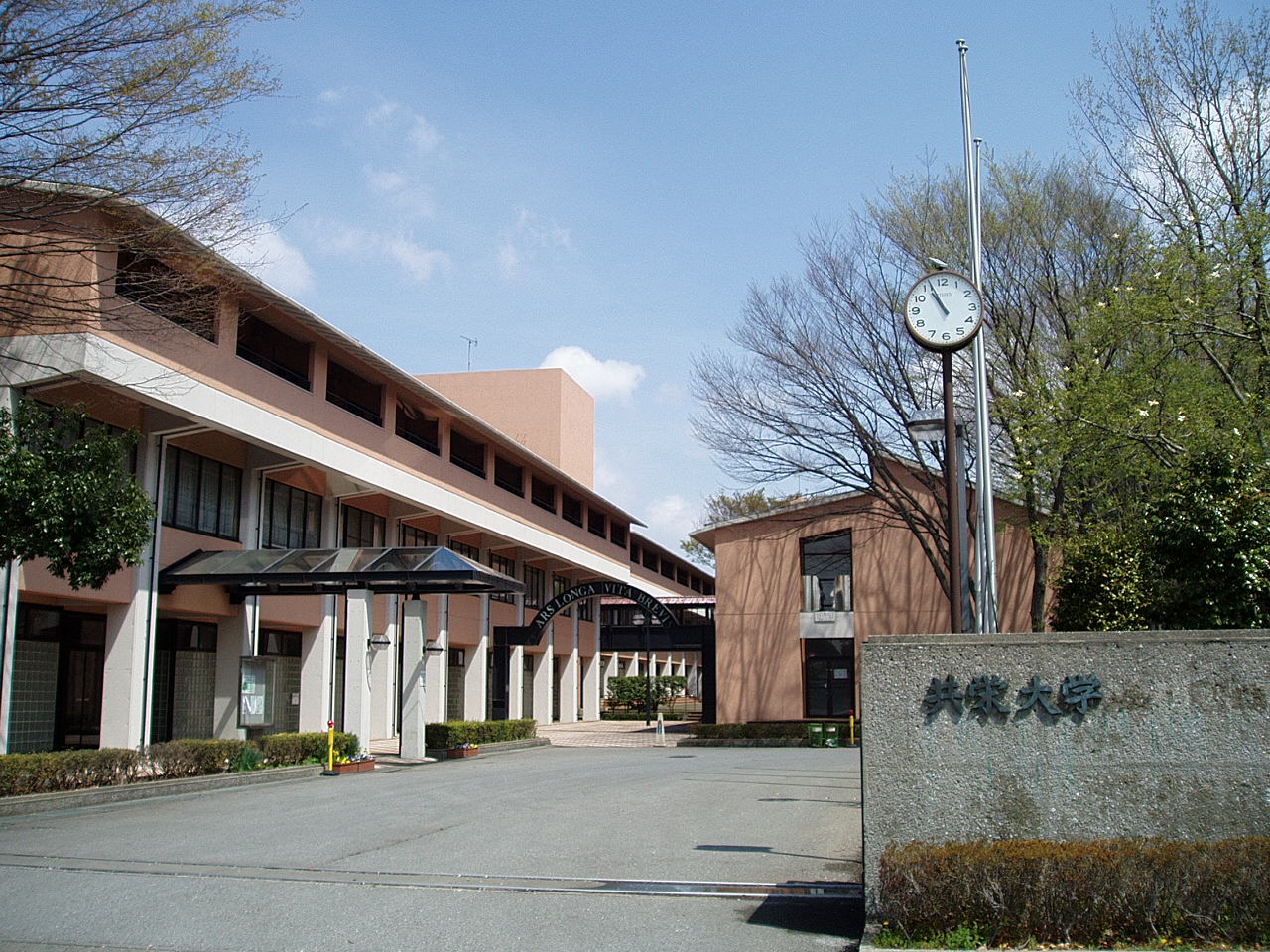
Main building (now the Faculty of Education, Kyoei University)

Kyoei Gakuen Junior College (共栄学園短期大学, Kyoei Gakuen Tanki Daigaku) is a private junior college in Kasukabe, Saitama, Japan, established in 1984.

== Academic department ==
- Academic department of Social Welfare
