= Kyoei University =

University in Saitama Prefecture, Japan

Coordinates: 35.9964°N 139.7235°E

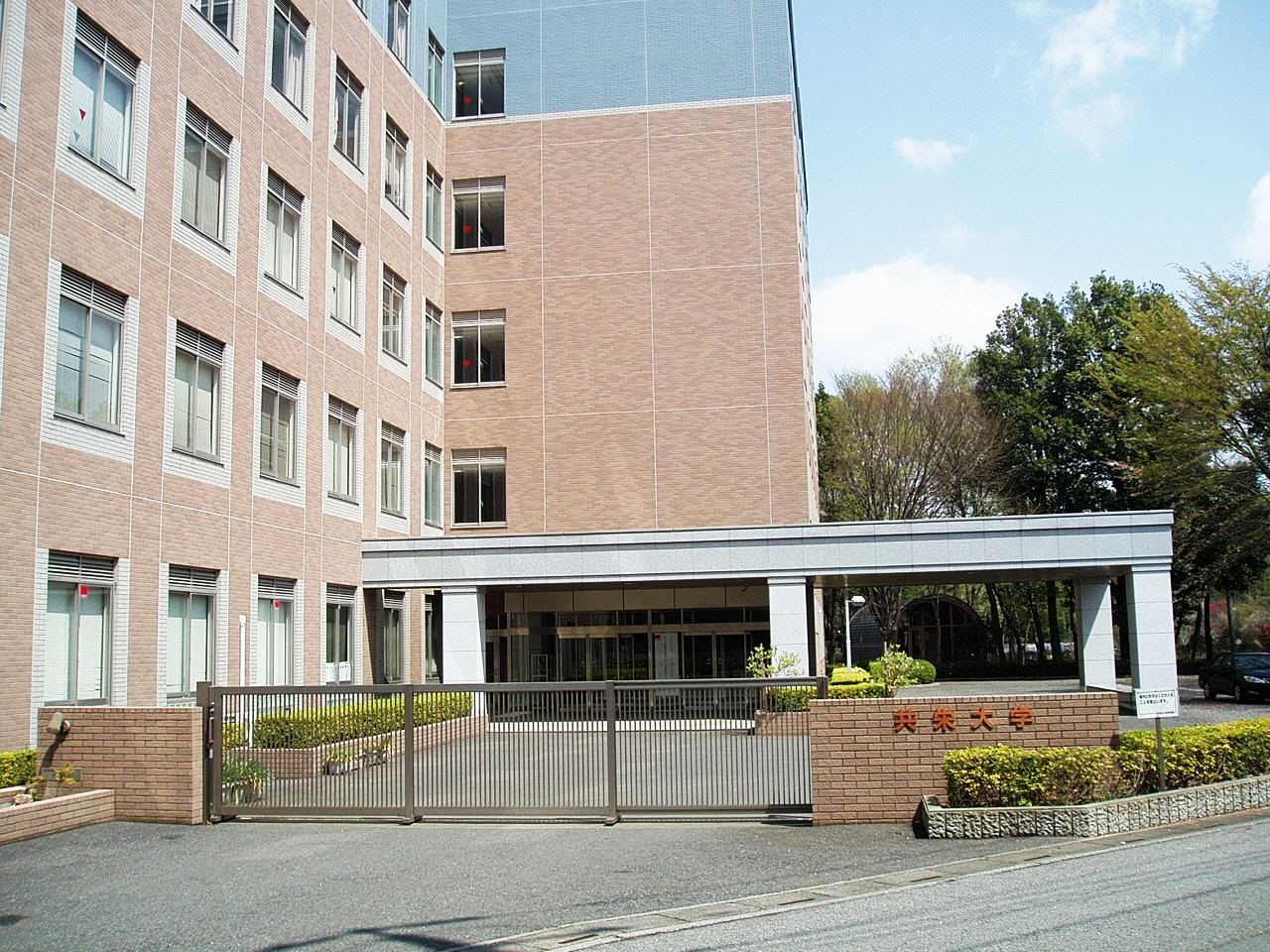
Main gate

Kyoei University (共栄大学, Kyōei daigaku) is a private university in Kasukabe, Saitama, Japan, established in 2001. The predecessor of the school was founded in 1933. The school also has attached junior college, high school, etc.

== Notable alumni ==
- Kagami Yoshimizu, manga artist
