= Kagami Yoshimizu =

Japanese manga artist

- Born: 美水 かがみ; October 7, 1977 (age 49); Satte, Saitama, Japan
- Notable work: Lucky Star

Kagami Yoshimizu (美水 かがみ, Yoshimizu Kagami; born 1977) is a Japanese manga artist from Satte, Saitama, Japan. He is best known as the creator of Lucky Star, which began serialization in Kadokawa Shoten's Comptiq magazine in December 2003. He is also credited for creating Comptiq's mascot character Comp-chan (コンプちゃん, Konpu-chan).

Yoshimizu also works under the pen name Tsukasa Suina (水奈 つかさ, Suina Tsukasa).

== Biography ==
Yoshimizu was born on 1977 in Satte, Saitama, Japan. He attended Kasukabe Kyōei High School, a private academy in the city of Kasukabe, where he graduated as part of the 14th graduating class.

From the time he was in junior high school, Yoshimizu enjoyed drawing, and in high school he began drawing manga featuring his classmates. While a member of the animation club in high school, he began seriously drawing manga and doing illustration work. After graduating from high school, he began attending a technical school and working as a graphic artist and working toward becoming a manga artist.

=== Manga art ===
Around that time, Yoshimizu met Gō Katō, who later became an editor—and then editor-in-chief—at Comptiq. Katō appears in the Lucky Star manga series as the rabbit "Editor K". After that, Yoshimizu got commission work to do spot illustrations and stories in anthology comic releases, in addition to doing original manga stories to fill out empty spots in the magazine when manga series completed.

One of the original series he created was Lucky Star, which became popular and was subsequently picked up as a regular series. The series had been on hiatus since 2014. On September 2, 2022, it was announced that Lucky Star would make a return. It began again on November 18, 2022, in the Mitaina! magazine. As of 2023, it runs in Comptiq.

== Works ==
=== Original illustration ===
- Warawanai Erika (笑わないエリカ) (Penguin Works, Windows 95/98, as Tsukasa Suina)
- Cake x 3! Ichigo Ichie (ケーキ×3! 〜苺いちえ〜) (Frau)
- Lucky Star: Ryōō Gakuen Ōtōsai (Kadokawa Shoten, PlayStation 2, original design, general supervision, main character paste-up images)

=== Manga ===
- Boku to, Bokura no Natsu (僕と、僕らの夏) (in Bessatsu Comic Comp, not yet collected in tankōbon format)
- Lucky Star (in Comptiq, Kadokawa Shoten)
  - Two series-within-a-series have also been published:
    - Akira's Kingdom (あきらの王国, Akira no Ōkoku) (in Comp Ace)
    - Miyakawa Family Hunger (宮河家の空腹, Miyakawa-ke no Kūfuku) (in Comptiq)
- Shuffle! (Comic A la Carte, one volume, yonkoma comic anthology)
- Akapro!!!: Cheerful Three Sisters Project (あか☆ぷろ!!!〜明るい三姉妹プロジェクト〜, Akapuro Akarui Sanshimai Purojekuto) (Character design, illustration and commercial four-panel comic strip, etc...)
- Wolf Children Spin-off four-panel comic strip (おおかみこどもの雨と雪スピンオフ4コマ, Ōkami Kodomo no Ame to Yuki Supinofu Yonkoma) (in Comptiq)

=== Novel illustration ===
- Revenge!! San Beruneto Gakuen Kitan (REVENGE!!〜サン・ベルネット学園綺譚〜) (as Tsukasa Suina, written by Izumi Morino, March 2003, ISBN 978-4-931495-11-1)
- Lucky Star: Lucky Star Murder Case (らき☆すた らき☆すた殺人事件, Raki Suta: Raki Suta Satsujin Jiken) (written by Tōka Takei, August 2007, ISBN 978-4-04-471203-7)
- Lucky Star: Lucky Star Online (らき☆すた らき☆すたオンライン, Raki Suta: Raki Suta Onrain) (written by Tōka Takei, March 2008, ISBN 978-4-04-471204-4)
- Lucky Star: Super Fairy Tale Battle (らき☆すた スーパー童話大戦, Raki Suta: Sūpā Dōwa Taisen) (written by Tōka Takei, October 2008, ISBN 978-4-04-471205-1)
- Lucky Star: Leisurely Days (らき☆すた ゆるゆるでぃず, Raki Suta: Yuruyuru Deizu) (written by Touko Machida, April 2009, ISBN 978-4-04-474201-0)
- Hayate the Combat Butler! SS Super Anthology Battle!! (ハヤテのごとく!SS 超アンソロジー大作戦!!, Hayate no Gotoku! Esu Esu Sūpā Ansorojī Daisakusen) (created by Kenjiro Hata, with illustrations by Toshihiko Tsukiji, Shōtarō Mizuki, Teru Arai, and Takafumi Nanatsuki, August 2009, ISBN 978-4-09-451156-7)
- Words for Young People (若き人々への言葉, Wakaki Hitobito no Kotoba) (cover illustration, by Friedrich Nietzsche, Kadokawa Shoten, 2011)
- Lucky Star: To Konata Glance (らき☆すた ひとめこなたに, Raki Suta: Hitome Konata ni) (written by Heisei Izu and Kei Tanaka, February 2012, ISBN 978-4-04-100042-7)

=== Anime ===
- Maesetsu! (Original character design)
