= Lucky Star (manga) =

Japanese four-panel manga and anime series

- Volume 1 tankōbon cover, featuring Konata Izumi (left), Tsukasa Hiiragi (top right), and Kagami Hiiragi (bottom right) playing on a PlayStation 2

らき☆すた (Raki☆Suta)
- Genre: Comedy, slice of life
- Manga
- Written by: Kagami Yoshimizu
- Published by: Kadokawa Shoten
- English publisher: Viz Media
- Magazine: Comptiq; Shōnen Ace; From Gamers; Ace Momogumi; Comp Ace; Dragon Magazine; Mobile Newtype; Comp H's; Saitama Shimbun; 4-Koma Nano Ace
- Original run: December 10, 2003 – present
- Volumes: 10
- Anime television series
- Directed by: Yutaka Yamamoto (1–4); Yasuhiro Takemoto (5–24)
- Written by: Touko Machida
- Music by: Satoru Kōsaki
- Studio: Kyoto Animation
- Licensed by: Crunchyroll (worldwide streaming, including North America); Anime Limited (UK); Madman Entertainment (Australia)
- Original network: CTC, TVS, RKK, tvk, KBS, TVQ, BSN, TVh, HOME, SUN, TBC, Tokyo MX, TVA, mit, SUT, KSB
- Original run: April 8, 2007 – September 16, 2007
- Episodes: 24
- Light novel
- Written by: Tōka Takei
- Illustrated by: Kagami Yoshimizu
- Published by: Kadokawa Shoten
- Imprint: Kadokawa Sneaker Bunko
- Original run: September 1, 2007 – October 1, 2008
- Volumes: 3
- Original video animation

Lucky Star: Original na Visual to Animation
- Directed by: Yasuhiro Takemoto
- Studio: Kyoto Animation
- Licensed by: Crunchyroll
- Released: September 26, 2008
- Runtime: 42 minutes
- Episodes: 1
- Original net animation

Miyakawa-ke no Kūfuku
- Directed by: Yutaka Yamamoto
- Written by: Tōko Machida
- Studio: Ordet, Encourage Films
- Released: April 29, 2013 – July 1, 2013
- Runtime: 5 minutes
- Episodes: 10
- Other manga
- Lucky Star Pocket Travelers; Miyakawa-ke no Kūfuku; Boo Boo Kagaboo; Miyakawa-ke ga Mampuku!?; Konata 30
- Other light novels
- Shin Lucky Star Moe Drill: Tabidachi: DX Pack Yoyaku Kōnyū Tokuten; Lucky Star: Yuruyuru Days; Lucky Star: Hitome Konata ni; Miyakawa-ke no Kūfuku
- Video games
- Lucky Star Moe Drill; Shin Lucky Star Moe Drill: Tabidachi; Lucky Star: Ryōō Gakuen Ōtōsai; Lucky Star: Net Idol Meister

Lucky Star (Japanese: らき☆すた, Hepburn: Raki Suta) is a Japanese four-panel comic strip manga series by Kagami Yoshimizu. It has been serialized in Kadokawa Shoten's Comptiq magazine since December 2003. Cameo strips were published in other magazines such as Shōnen Ace and others. Lucky Star is a slice of life manga focusing on the daily lives of four girls, and has little overarching plot.

An audio drama CD based on the series was released in August 2005, and the series spawned four video games released between 2005 and 2009. A 24-episode anime adaptation produced by Kyoto Animation aired between April 8 and September 16, 2007. The anime was licensed in North America by Kadokawa Pictures and distributed by Bandai Entertainment; six DVDs have been released between May 2008 and March 2009. An original video animation (OVA) episode was released on September 26, 2008 accompanied by a drama CD. Bandai Entertainment released the OVA in an English-sub only version on August 4, 2009. Viz Media acquired the rights to publish the manga digitally in 2014.

A spin-off manga, Miyakawa-ke no Kūfuku, began serialization in January 2008 in Kadokawa Shoten's Comp H's magazine. An anime adaptation by Ordet and Encourage Films began airing on Ustream in April 2013.

== Synopsis ==
The main characters of Lucky Star as they appear in the anime adaptation: (from left to right) Tsukasa Hiiragi, Konata Izumi, Kagami Hiiragi, and Miyuki Takara.

Lucky Star's story mainly portrays the lives of four girls attending a Japanese high school. The setting is mainly based on the city of Kuki in Saitama Prefecture. The main character is Konata Izumi, a lazy girl who constantly shirks her schoolwork and instead uses most of her time to watch anime, play video games, and read manga. Although she is lazy, she has also proven to be very intelligent and athletic.

The serialization began with the four main characters in their first year of high school: Konata Izumi, Kagami Hiiragi, Tsukasa Hiiragi, and Miyuki Takara. As the story progresses, they move on to their second and third years. However, the anime starts the story with them beginning their second year, and the other high school girls that are seen in the opening are only introduced halfway through the series. The storyline usually includes numerous references to popular past and present manga, anime, and tokusatsu series.

The spin-off manga, Miyakawa-ke no Kūfuku, focuses on the daily lives of two sisters, Hinata and Hikage Miyakawa, who live an impoverished life due to Hinata's wasteful habits.

== Media ==
=== Manga ===
The four-panel comic strip manga version of Lucky Star started serialization in Kadokawa Shoten's magazine Comptiq's January 2004 issue sold on December 10, 2003. The first tankōbon volume of the manga was published on January 8, 2005, and as of October 26, 2013, ten volumes have been released. Besides Comptiq, the manga was also featured in other Kadokawa magazines including Shōnen Ace, Newtype, Comp Ace, Dragon Magazine, Mobile Newtype and Kadokawa Hotline for various lengths of time. The manga went on a lengthy hiatus beginning in 2014, later returning to regular serialization in Kadokawa's Mitaina! magazine on November 10, 2022. The manga was licensed by Bandai Entertainment for release in English in North America, and the first volume was released in June 2009, though only the first eight volumes were produced. Following Bandai Entertainment's closure, the manga has been licensed by Viz Media.

A spin-off manga titled Lucky Star Pocket Travelers (らき☆すた ポケットとらべら〜ず, Raki☆Suta Poketto Toraberāzu), which has the four main characters waking up one morning to discover they have shrunken to doll size, was serialized in Comp Ace between the January and August 2008 issues. A single volume of Pocket Travelers was released on October 10, 2008.

Another spin-off manga, based on the Lucky Star Moe Drill video games and titled Miyakawa-ke no Kūfuku (宮河家の空腹, The Miyakawa Family's Hunger), began serialization in the January 2008 issue of Kadokawa Shoten's Comp H's magazine. The magazine transferred to Comp Ace with the June 2009 issue, and has also been featured in Comptiq. The first volume of Miyakawa-ke no Kūfuku was released on June 26, 2012.

An official parody manga titled Boo Boo Kagaboo (ぶーぶーかがぶー, Bū Bū Kagabū) by manga artist Eretto was serialized in Comp Ace between the July 2008 and December 2009 issues. A single volume of Boo Boo Kagaboo was released on March 18, 2010.

Another spin-off manga, based on the Miyakawa-ke no Kūfuku manga and titled Miyakawa-ke ga Mampuku!? (宮河家が満腹!?) by manga artist Tsubomi Hanabana and cuisine supervisor Etsuko Ichise was serialized in Comp Ace between the November 2013 and May 2014 issues. A single volume of Miyakawa-ke ga Mampuku!? was released on July 10, 2014.

In November 2022, shortly after returning from its 8-year hiatus, a new spin-off tentatively titled Konata 30 (こなた 30) was announced. It is to be set 15 years after the original series.

=== Anime ===
The Lucky Star anime, produced by Kyoto Animation, aired between April 8, 2007, and September 16, 2007, containing twenty-four episodes. After the first four episodes, series director Yutaka Yamamoto was fired from his position and was subsequently replaced by Yasuhiro Takemoto. The reason given was that: "Our company has determined that the director of Lucky Star—Yutaka Yamamoto—has not reached the standard of director yet, therefore we have changed the director."

Near the end of every episode, there is an additional segment called Lucky Channel (らっきー☆ちゃんねる) co-hosted by Akira Kogami and her assistant Minoru Shiraishi. The humor of this segment takes on a decidedly darker, mean-spirited, more cynical and mature tone than the main show, disguised as an infomercial that skims over characters who appear in the anime, but mainly deals with the progressively abusive and violent work-relationship between Akira and Minoru. Akira is a typical "cute excitable girl" character while going through her script, but instantly changes to a bored, perpetually annoyed character the moment her segment is officially done and sometimes before then too. The anime also features small cameos of voice actors besides Shiraishi that also have worked with Kyoto Animation which include Yuko Goto, Minori Chihara, Tomokazu Sugita, Daisuke Ono, and Aya Hirano, all of whom voice themselves.

Kadokawa Pictures USA and Bandai Entertainment announced that they licensed the Lucky Star anime with a teaser trailer as a special feature on the volume 4 DVD of The Melancholy of Haruhi Suzumiya. The first four English DVD volumes were released by Bandai Entertainment in 2008 on May 6, July 1, September 2, and November 18. The fifth and sixth volumes were released in 2009 on January 6 and March 17. However, the sixth volume's limited edition release has been canceled due to low sales of the other volumes' limited editions. Bandai released a six-disc DVD box set on April 6, 2010, as a complete collection under their Anime Legends line. As much as possible, the English cast was paired with the same characters as those of the Japanese voice actors from past shows, in order to translate the anime references clearly. For example, Wendee Lee voiced the lead roles for both Haruhi Suzumiya and Lucky Star, in reference to their original voice actor, Aya Hirano. At AmeCon 2010, European anime distributor Beez Entertainment announced that they have the distributions rights to both TV series and OVA, and will be released in two half season sets. Following the 2012 closure of Bandai Entertainment, Funimation Entertainment (now known as Crunchyroll) announced at Otakon 2014 that they have licensed the anime television series, which they released on Blu-ray and DVD on July 12, 2016.

A pre-announcement was made in Kadokawa Shoten's Comptiq magazine that an original video animation project would be produced for Lucky Star. The June 2008 issue of Comptiq reported that the OVA was due out in summer 2008. However, it was delayed and instead was released on September 26, 2008. The OVA features six separate stories revolving around the cast, some of which border on the bizarre; one of which is an MMORPG environment being played by Konata, Kagami, Tsukasa, and Nanako Kuroi, and another in which Kagami has a 'suggestive' dream about Konata. The Lucky Channel segment is performed in live-action rather than being animated. The ending theme to the OVA, "Ai o Torimodose!!" (愛をとりもどせ!!; lit. 'Recover Love!!'), is sung by Uchōten, which is composed of the singers Hiromi Konno and Minoru Shiraishi. The song was originally the opening theme to Fist of the North Star. The North American release of the OVA was later licensed by Bandai Entertainment, and was released in a subbed-only DVD on August 4, 2009. As with the TV series, the OVA has also been re-licensed to Funimation.

An anime adaptation of Miyakawa-ke no Kūfuku, produced by Ordet and Encourage Films, streamed on Ustream from April 29 to July 1, 2013. The opening theme is "Kachigumi" by Konata Izumi (Hirano) and Kagami Hiiragi (Emiri Katō), and the ending theme is "Makegumi" by Hinata and Hikage Miyakawa (Maina Shimagata and Koto Kawasaki). "The Cape of Age Thirty" (三十路岬, Misoji Misaki) by Hiromi Konno was used as an insert song in episode one.

=== Books ===
There have been five light novels based on the series published by Kadokawa Shoten under their Kadokawa Sneaker Bunko label. The three novels are written by Tōka Takei and feature illustrations by Lucky Star's original author Kagami Yoshimizu. The first light novel, Lucky Star: Lucky Star Murder Case (らき☆すた: らき☆すた殺人事件, Raki☆Suta Raki☆Suta Satsujin Jiken), was published on September 1, 2007. The second light novel, Lucky Star: Lucky Star Online (らき☆すた らき☆すたオンライン), was published on March 1, 2008, and the third, Lucky Star Super Dōwa Taisen (らき☆すた スーパー童話大戦), was published on October 1, 2008. The fourth light novel is written by Touko Machida and feature illustrations by Yukiko Horiguchi, Lucky Star: Yuruyuru Days (らき☆すた ゆるゆるでぃず), was published on April 1, 2009. The fifth light novel is written by Heisei Izu and Kei Tanaka, and feature illustrations by Kagami Yoshimizu, Lucky Star: Hitome Konata ni (らき☆すた ひとめこなたに), was published on February 1, 2012. A spin-off light novel, based on the Miyakawa-ke no Kūfuku anime, is written by Touko Machida and features illustrations by Harapeko and Tsubomi Hanabana; it was published on February 1, 2014. An original novel written by Osamu Kudō was also offered as a pre-order bonus for Shin Lucky Star Moe Drill: Tabidachi: DX Pack.

In 2010, a theoretical chemistry book was published by Chukei Publishing titled Impressive Learning Chemistry (Theoretical Chemistry) With Lucky Star (『らき☆すた』と学ぶ 化学[理論編]が面白いほどわかる本), written by Takashi Matsubara and feature illustrations by Kagami Yoshimizu. In 2013, an organic chemistry book was published by Chukei Publishing titled Impressive Learning Chemistry (Organic Chemistry) With Lucky Star (『らき☆すた』と学ぶ 化学[有機編]が面白いほどわかる本), written by Takashi Matsubara and feature illustrations by Kagami Yoshimizu, with characters such as Konata, Tsukasa and other girls. In 2013, an inorganic chemistry book was published by Kadokawa Chukei Publishing titled Impressive Learning Chemistry (Inorganic Chemistry) With Lucky Star (『らき☆すた』と学ぶ 化学［無機編］が面白いほどわかる本); it was written by Masashi Inutsuka and features illustrations by Kagami Yoshimizu and Sayoi.

=== Video games ===
A video game, titled Lucky Star Moe Drill (らき☆すた 萌えドリル, Raki☆Suta Moe Doriru), was released on December 1, 2005, on the Nintendo DS. A limited edition game with many extras was sold called the "DX Pack" along with the regular version. A sequel, with the title of Shin Lucky Star Moe Drill: Tabidachi (真・らき☆すた 萌えドリル 〜旅立ち〜, Shin Raki☆Suta Moe Doriru ~Tabidachi~) was released on May 24, 2007. The first game tests the player on various subjects and memorizations. The player's main objective is beating other characters in quizzes. There is also a "Drama Mode" where the game plays a mini-adventure game as the player makes their way to Akihabara, with math quizzes and mini games (about five in all). In an August 2007 survey by Dengeki G's Magazine, Shin Lucky Star Moe Drill: Tabidachi was voted the 17th most interesting bishōjo game by readers, tying with Ever 17: The Out of Infinity.

There are two different types of one-person games: "Hitasura Drill" and "Drama Mode". The player can also link the game with another person. When this occurs, the player can use the character that is built up in Drama Mode as a selectable character. Additionally, if the player wants to use a special battle skill against his or her opponent while in link mode, the player must shout out the name of the skill into the microphone. In Drama Mode, the player partners with one of the characters, and tries to increase her parameters and have her learn new battle skills. There are five different types of "drills". One of the quizzes called "Ondoku" requires the player to shout out the answer into the microphone. Several mascot characters of large anime and dōjin shops (like Broccoli's Di Gi Charat, Animate's Anime Tencho and Toranoana's Miko) make cameo appearances.

Kadokawa Shoten produced a visual novel game for the PlayStation 2 entitled Lucky Star: Ryōō Gakuen Ōtōsai (らき☆すた 〜陵桜学園 桜藤祭〜) which was released in Japan on January 24, 2008. A portable version was released on December 23, 2010, for the PlayStation Portable (PSP). Kadokawa Shoten also produced an SLG game for the PSP titled Lucky Star: Net Idol Meister (らき☆すた ネットアイドル・マイスター), released in Japan on December 24, 2009.

=== Audio CDs ===
The Lucky Star drama CD, aptly entitled Drama CD Lucky Star, was released on August 24, 2005, by Frontier Works. The video game soundtrack entitled Lucky Star vocal mini album was released on December 22, 2005. The anime opening theme single Motteke! Sailor Fuku was released on May 23, 2007. An album containing the first twelve ending themes entitled Lucky Star Ending Theme Collection was released on July 11, 2007, by Lantis. A maxi single with the name Aimai Net Darling (曖昧ネットだーりん, Aimai Netto Daarin) containing two songs sung by Hiromi Konno as Akira Kogami, and Minoru Shiraishi as himself in the anime version was released on July 25, 2007. A remix single of Motteke! Sailor Fuku was released on August 8, 2007, by Lantis. Two more albums were released on August 29, 2007: Misoji Misaki by Hiromi Konno as Akira Kogami, and Cosplay It! Oh My Honey, by Aya Hirano as Konata, and Nozomi Sasaki as Patricia. An album called Shiraishi Minoru no Otoko no Rarabai contains the ending themes sung by Minoru Shiraishi from episode thirteen onwards and was released on October 10, 2007.

Four character song CDs were released on September 5, 2007, sung by the voice actresses Aya Hirano as Konata, Emiri Katō as Kagami, Kaori Fukuhara as Tsukasa, and Aya Endo as Miyuki. Four more character CDs followed on September 26, 2007, sung by the voice actresses Shizuka Hasegawa as Yutaka, Minori Chihara as Minami, Kaori Shimizu as Hiyori, and Nozomi Sasaki as Patricia. Another two character CDs followed on October 24, 2007: one as a duet between the voice actresses Kaoru Mizuhara as Misao Kusakabe, and Mai Aizawa as Ayano Minegishi, and the other as a trio between Aya Hirano, Shizuka Hasegawa, and Minori Chihara as Konata, Yutaka, and Minami respectively. Another two character CDs, both duets, followed on November 21, 2007: the first between Hirokazu Hiramatsu as Sōjirō Izumi, and Sumi Shimamoto as Kanata Izumi, and the other with Saori Nishihara as Yui Narumi, and Konomi Maeda as Nanako Kuroi. A thirteenth character CD, again sung by Kaoru Mizuhara as Misao Kusakabe, was released on March 26, 2008.

An album entitled Lucky Star BGM & Radio Bangumi "Lucky Channel" no Digest o Shūroku Shita Special CD 1 was released with the first anime DVD on June 22, 2007. The album contained background music tracks featured in the anime, by Haruhi Suzumiya composer Satoru Kōsaki, along with original audio dramas featuring Hiromi Konno as Akira Kogami, and Minoru Shiraishi, as himself. Another similar album with more background music tracks and audio dramas was released with the second anime DVD on July 27. The third volume in this series was released with the third anime DVD on August 24. The fourth volume followed with the fourth DVD on September 28, the fifth volume was released on October 26 while the sixth and seventh volumes were released on November 27 and December 21, 2007, respectively.

=== Live concert and musical ===
A live concert was held on March 29, 2009, at the Budokan called Lucky Star in Budokan: Anata no Tame dakara (らき☆すた in 武道館 〜あなたのためだから〜) spanning 4 hours, 40 minutes. The concert featured the various cast members from the anime, and was hosted by Hiromi Konno (the voice of Akira Kogami) and Minoru Shiraishi. A DVD of the concert was released on December 25, 2009, and included a 24-page booklet with 2 DVDs.

A musical was held between September 20–30, 2012 at the Tokyo Dome City Attractions "Theatre G-Rosso" called Lucky Star ≈ On Stage (らき☆すた≒おん☆すて, Raki☆Suta≈On☆Sute).

Cast

- Konata Izumi (泉こなた) - Ran Sakai
- Tsukasa Hiiragi (柊つかさ) - Mana Ogawa
- Kagami Hiiragi (柊かがみ) - Yurino Sakurai
- Miyuki Takara (高良みゆき) - Wakana Hagiwara
- Yutaka Kobayakawa (小早川ゆたか) - Ayumi Mizukoshi
- Minami Iwasaki (岩崎みなみ) - Makoto Koichi
- Misao Kusakabe (日下部みさお) - Yurika Sannomiya
- Ayano Minegishi (峰岸あやの) - Mayu Yoshioka
- Nanako Kuroi (黒井ななこ) - Ryō Koarai
- Sōjirō Izumi (泉そうじろう) - Katsuyuki Miyake
- Nagisa Nagatoro (長瀞なぎさ) - Motoko Nakane
- Aoi Higashimatsuyama (東松山あおい) - Mao Higuchi
- Chinami Koshigaya (越谷ちなみ) - Chika Kumagai
- Blaster Kino (ブラスター木野, Burasutā Kino) - Ryōsuke Tsuruta
- Speedy Kawai (飛ばしや川井, Tobashiya Kawai) - Kensuke Fukuyama
- Angel Ozaki (エンジェル尾崎, Enjeru Ozaki) - Shin Ginoza
- Aizaki the Razor (カミソリ相崎, Kamisori Aizaki) - Shō Takano
- Akira Kogami (小神あきら) - Mizuho Nagashima
- MC Masanori Mori (MC森雅紀) - Masanori Mori

== Reception ==
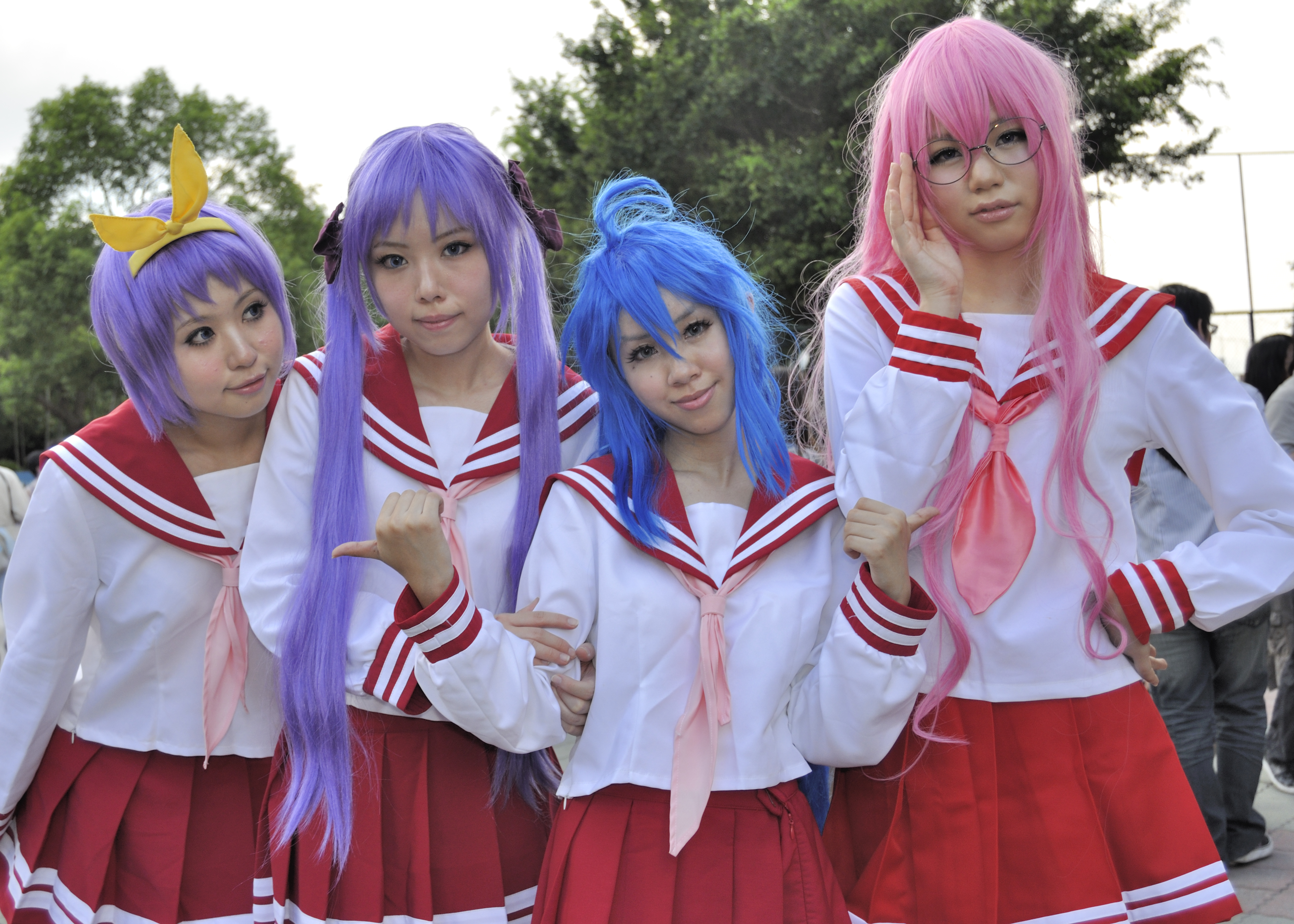
Cosplayers of Tsukasa, Kagami, Konata & Miyuki

Before Lucky Star was made into an anime, Kagami Yoshimizu, the author of the original manga, was interviewed by Newtype USA in the June 2005 issue where he stated, "I don't really think my production process is anything special." However, he has the opinion that "...my personality is very well suited to doing four-panel comic strips, and I really enjoy creating this one." As if to predict the future, Yoshimizu also was quoted to say, "...but one day, I wouldn't mind seeing these characters moving around on screen." In the same interview, Newtype USA reported that the first volume of the manga sold out so quickly that Kadokawa Shoten had to do a rush reprint. As of April 2008, the first five volumes of the Lucky Star manga have collectively sold over 1.8 million copies.

Lucky Star became an immediate hit in Japan, receiving a broad following in the anime fandom. Explaining this phenomenon, the analyst John Oppliger of AnimeNation, for example, suggested that a major factor in the series' success is its similarity to an earlier work by Kyoto Animation—The Melancholy of Haruhi Suzumiya (the show itself makes numerous references to the same series). However, he also admitted that Lucky Star is quite different from its "predecessor" and that the second major factor is its "unique" composition that "panders to the tastes of otaku, but does so with good humor and sly wit", thus, making it "the ultimate in fan service", a "witty, self-indulgent, guilty pleasure".

The Special First Edition version of the first DVD volume was released on June 22, 2007, and contained the first two episodes to the anime. The first DVD sold quickly in Japan, and it has been reported that "Amazon Japan has already sold out its entire supply of the DVD." Furthermore, "the majority of the stores [in Akihabara] with special displays for Lucky Star have run out." Anime News Network has noted that the anime is "extremely otaku-centric".

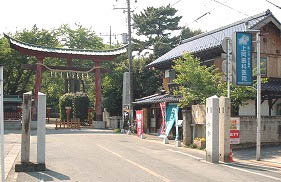
The opening animation of the anime featured this shot of the Washinomiya Shrine.

The popularity of Lucky Star also brought many of its fans to the real life settings of the anime, beginning in April 2007. The August issue of the Newtype magazine ran a feature on the various locales which the anime is based on, including Konata's home in Satte, Saitama, Kagami and Tsukasa's home in Washimiya, Saitama, and the school in Kasukabe, Saitama. The magazine also included directions on how to reach these places from the otaku hotspot Akihabara, which resulted in massive "pilgrimages" to these areas.

The most widely reported consequence of this is in the Washinomiya Shrine of Washimiya, where the Hiiragi sisters work as miko in the anime. Various Japanese news media reported that the shrine became a place teeming with photographers trying to replicate scenes from the anime, cosplayers wandering around, and ema prayer plaques ridden with anime drawings and strange prayers like "Konata is my wife". The ema were mentioned in episode 21 of the anime.

The locals were initially divided on the situation, with some suggesting that it is good for the shrine to have so many worshippers, and some being concerned about the town's security. Despite the negative reaction by some of the locals, the Washinomiya Shrine hosted a Lucky Star event in December 2007, featuring special guests including Yoshimizu and the voice actors Hiromi Konno, Emiri Katō, Kaori Fukuhara, and Minoru Shiraishi. The event attracted 3500 fans. Subsequently, the Hiiragi family have been registered as official residents of Washimiya because of the anime's wild popularity. Other fictional characters who share this honor in Saitama are Astro Boy of Niza and Crayon Shin-chan's family of Kasukabe. As of July 30, 2008, sales of Lucky Star food and goods brought the town of Washimiya ¥42,000,000 (about US$390,000) in income, described by The Wall Street Journal as a source of relief to the local economy reeling from Japan's economic slump in the 1990s.

== Notes and references ==
Footnotes

General

- Maeda, Hisashi; et al. (May 2007). "Lucky Star". Newtype USA. Vol. 6, no. 5. A.D. Vision. p. 67. ISSN 1541-4817.

Specific
