= List of Haruhi Suzumiya video games =

The Haruhi Suzumiya video games have been published by Namco Bandai Games, Banpresto, Kadokawa Shoten, and Sega. The games revolve around Haruhi Suzumiya, a high school girl who is obsessed with the supernatural. To find the supernatural, she forms the SOS Brigade to investigate mysterious happenings with four other members: Kyon, Yuki Nagato, Mikuru Asahina, and Itsuki Koizumi. Games have been released on the PlayStation 2, PlayStation 3, Wii, PlayStation Portable, and Nintendo DS, as well as mobile devices. The series features several genres including adventure games, visual novels, and a music video game. The series debuted in Japan on December 27, 2007, with Suzumiya Haruhi no Yakusoku. The series contains eight released games, the latest of which being Suzumiya Haruhi-chan no Mahjong released in July 2011.

== Video games ==
Game	Details
Suzumiya Haruhi no Yakusoku Original release date(s): JP: December 27, 2007	Release years by system: 2007—PlayStation Portable
Suzumiya Haruhi no Yakusoku Original release date(s): JP: December 27, 2007	Notes: Published and developed by Namco Bandai Games; Also known as The Promise of Haruhi Suzumiya; An Adventure/visual novel game
Suzumiya Haruhi no Tomadoi Original release date(s): JP: January 31, 2008	Release years by system: 2008—PlayStation 2
Suzumiya Haruhi no Tomadoi Original release date(s): JP: January 31, 2008	Notes: Published and developed by Banpresto; Also known as The Perplexity of Haruhi Suzumiya; An Adventure/visual novel game
Suzumiya Haruhi no Gekidō Original release date(s): JP: January 22, 2009	Release years by system: 2009—Wii
Suzumiya Haruhi no Gekidō Original release date(s): JP: January 22, 2009	Notes: Published and developed by Kadokawa Shoten; Also known as The Excitement of Haruhi Suzumiya; Exercise, Music
Suzumiya Haruhi no Heiretsu Original release date(s): JP: March 26, 2009	Release years by system: 2009—Wii
Suzumiya Haruhi no Heiretsu Original release date(s): JP: March 26, 2009	Notes: Developed by Cavia and published by Sega; Also known as The Parallel of Haruhi Suzumiya; An interactive adventure game with 3D environments and characters
Suzumiya Haruhi no Chokuretsu Original release date(s): JP: May 28, 2009	Release years by system: 2009—Nintendo DS
Suzumiya Haruhi no Chokuretsu Original release date(s): JP: May 28, 2009	Notes: Developed by Cavia and published by Sega; Also known as The Series of Haruhi Suzumiya; An adventure/visual novel game
Day of Sagittarius III Original release date(s): WW: February 2010	Release years by system: 2010—iOS (iPhone, iPod Touch, iPad)
Day of Sagittarius III Original release date(s): WW: February 2010	Notes: Published by Kadokawa Shoten; Based on the game featured in the fifth light novel, The Rampage of Haruhi Suzumiya; Currently the only Haruhi Suzumiya game to be officially released in English.; No longer available following the removal of 32-bit apps from the App Store.
Suzumiya Haruhi no Tsuisō Original release date(s): JP: May 12, 2011	Release years by system: 2011—PlayStation 3, PlayStation Portable
Suzumiya Haruhi no Tsuisō Original release date(s): JP: May 12, 2011	Notes: Published and developed by Namco Bandai Games; Original story set after The Disappearance of Haruhi Suzumiya; Also known as The Reminiscence of Haruhi Suzumiya; A "wandering adventure" game
Suzumiya Haruhi no Danketsu Original release date(s): JP: June 15, 2011	Release years by system: 2011—GREE platform (Feature phones)
Suzumiya Haruhi no Danketsu Original release date(s): JP: June 15, 2011	Notes: Social game released as part of GREE, Inc. and Kadokawa's business partnership; Released on GREE's Feature Phone social game platform; Also known as The Unity of Haruhi Suzumiya
Suzumiya Haruhi-chan no Mahjong Original release date(s): JP: July 7, 2011	Release years by system: 2011—PlayStation Portable
Suzumiya Haruhi-chan no Mahjong Original release date(s): JP: July 7, 2011	Notes: Published and developed by Kadokawa Games; A Mahjong video game based on the spin-off manga by Puyo, The Melancholy of Suzumiya Haruhi-chan.; Also known as The Mahjong of Haruhi-chan Suzumiya
Suzumiya Haruhi no Tensei Original release date(s): JP: June 28, 2012	Release years by system: 2012—GREE platform (Feature phones & smartphones)
Suzumiya Haruhi no Tensei Original release date(s): JP: June 28, 2012	Notes: Social game released as part of GREE, inc. and Kadokawa's business partnership; An online Card battle game with social elements; Released on GREE's Feature Phone social game platform; Also made available on GREE's app distribution service for their smartphone devices; Also known as The Reincarnation of Haruhi Suzumiya
