= The Disappearance of Nagato Yuki-chan =

Japanese manga and anime series

- English cover of the first manga volume

長門有希ちゃんの消失 (Nagato Yuki-chan no Shōshitsu)
- Genre: Romantic comedy
- Manga
- Written by: Puyo
- Published by: Kadokawa Shoten
- English publisher: NA: Yen Press
- Magazine: Young Ace
- Original run: July 4, 2009 – August 4, 2016
- Volumes: 10
- Anime television series
- Directed by: Jun'ichi Wada
- Written by: Touko Machida
- Music by: Tatsuya Kato
- Studio: Satelight
- Licensed by: Crunchyroll (Note: Formerly known as Funimation.); AUS: Madman Entertainment
- Original network: Tokyo MX, AT-X, BS11, CTC, tvk, TVS, SUN, TVQ, SBC, GBS, MTV
- Original run: April 3, 2015 – July 17, 2015
- Episodes: 16 + OVA

The Disappearance of Nagato Yuki-chan (長門有希ちゃんの消失, Nagato Yuki-chan no Shōshitsu) is a Japanese manga series written and illustrated by Puyo. The series is a spinoff of Nagaru Tanigawa's Haruhi Suzumiya light novel series, and is based on the alternate universe originally featured in the series' fourth volume and feature film, The Disappearance of Haruhi Suzumiya. The series was serialized in Kadokawa Shoten's Young Ace magazine from July 2009 to August 2016 and is licensed by Yen Press. A 16-episode anime television series adaptation by Satelight aired between April and July 2015, with an original video animation episode released in October 2015.

== Synopsis ==
The setting is based on the alternate universe depicted in The Disappearance of Haruhi Suzumiya, in which Haruhi Suzumiya never formed the SOS Brigade, though there are a number of differences in both characterizations and continuity, such as Yuki Nagato being in the same class as Kyon and Ryoko Asakura. In this world, Yuki Nagato is not a stoic alien but rather a shy and tentative girl who is a member of North High's literature club alongside Ryoko Asakura, her best friend, and Kyon, whom she has a crush on. The series follows Yuki and her companions as she develops feelings for Kyon and tries to gather the courage to confess her love to him.

== Publication ==
The original manga by Puyo was serialized in Kadokawa Shoten's Young Ace magazine from July 4, 2009, to August 4, 2016. Kadokawa Shoten published ten tankōbon volumes from February 4, 2010, to February 4, 2017. The series is licensed in North America by Yen Press, who began releasing the series from July 24, 2012.

== Media ==
=== Anime ===
On December 18, 2013, which refers to a pivotal date depicted in The Disappearance of Haruhi Suzumiya, the official website for the Haruhi Suzumiya series "vanished" and was replaced by a fake error page containing a hidden link revealing that an anime adaptation of The Disappearance of Nagato Yuki-chan was in production. A year later, on December 18, 2014, the site revealed the staff and cast for the series. Unlike its predecessor, the series has been produced by Satelight rather than Kyoto Animation who produced the previous Haruhi anime with direction by Jun'ichi Wada, series composition by Touko Machida, and character design by Ikuko Ito. Additionally, the cast of The Melancholy of Haruhi Suzumiya anime series reprise their roles as the main cast. The 16-episode series aired in Japan from April 3 to July 17, 2015, and depicts events from the first five volumes of the manga. An original video animation was bundled with the manga's ninth volume on October 26, 2015.

The series has been licensed for streaming in North America by Funimation (now known as Crunchyroll), who simulcasted the subtitled version as it aired. A broadcast dub version, featuring the same cast as Bang Zoom! Entertainment's dub of the previous Haruhi series, began streaming from May 29, 2015. The opening theme is "Fure Fure Mirai" (フレ降レミライ, Pouring Future) by Kitakō Bungei-bu Joshikai (Minori Chihara, Natsuko Kuwatani, Yūko Gotō, Yuki Matsuoka, and Aya Hirano), and the ending theme is "Arigatō, Daisuki" (ありがとう、だいすき, Thank You, I Love You) by Chihara. An acoustic version of "Arigatō, Daisuki" is used for episode 13.

==== Episode list ====
| No. | Title | Original release date |
|---|---|---|
| 1 | "Precious Place" "Taisetsu na Basho" (大切な場所) | April 3, 2015 |
Yuki Nagato is a shy girl who spends her time in North High School's Literature Club along with Ryoko Asakura, her best friend, and Kyon, whom she has a crush on. As Christmas approaches, Yuki is determined to have a party in her clubroom to celebrate the others' joining and keeping the club going. Whilst shopping for turkey for the party, the trio run into Mikuru Asahina and Tsuruya. Tsuruya puts Yuki in a contest against Mikuru for one of her own turkeys, which just ends up being between Ryoko and Tsuruya, since Yuki and Mikuru both give mediocre performances in every event. As Asakura gets permission to use the clubroom for a party, Yuki recalls the time when Kyon helped her get a library card.
| 2 | "Joy to the World" "Morobito Kozorite" (もろびとこぞりて) | April 10, 2015 |
As the Christmas party gets underway, Yuki recalls when the Literature Club was in danger of being shut down due to a lack of members. Yuki encountered a mysterious girl from Kouyouen Academy who dragged her into writing an alien message to Santa in the playground. Finding confidence in the girl's positive attitude, Yuki was able to ask Ryoko and Kyon to join the club. Back at the party, Yuki tries to work up the courage to confess to Kyon but is interrupted by Asakura. The next day, Yuki and Kyon are surprised when the mysterious girl from Kouyouen Academy suddenly lands in front of them, unconscious.
| 3 | "Haruhi Suzumiya!!" "Suzumiya Haruhi!!" (涼宮ハルヒ!!) | April 17, 2015 |
Yuki and Kyon help out the girl, Haruhi Suzumiya, who says she spent the night attempting to capture Santa. She expresses her dream to meet aliens, time travelers, and espers. Yuki reminds Haruhi of their earlier encounter and thanks her for inspiring her to keep the club going. Haruhi refuses her thanks, saying Yuki should take all the credit for her own actions. At the start of the New Year, Haruhi shows up at the Literature Club with her classmate Itsuki Koizumi and takes over the club, declaring herself the "executive president", filling the clubroom with her costumes and other props, and making Itsuki and Kyon help her to forcibly recruit Mikuru Asahina as a member.
| 4 | "Be My Valentine" | April 24, 2015 |
Yuki plans to confess to Kyon on Valentine's Day, so the female Literature Club members make plans to arrive late to the club meeting so that Yuki can meet Kyon alone. On the day before Valentine's Day, Ryoko helps Yuki make Valentine chocolates while Haruhi takes Kyon to a cafe and to a river to try to catch water imps. They bond over Haruhi's interest in the supernatural, and their bickering becomes increasingly playful. The next day, Yuki enters the clubroom as planned, but stops short when she sees Kyon happily accepting a bar of chocolate from Haruhi.
| 5 | "Her Melancholy" "Kanojo no Yūutsu" (彼女の憂鬱) | May 1, 2015 |
Yuki flees from the clubroom. Ryoko accuses Haruhi of deliberately sabotaging their plan for Yuki. Haruhi says she has misunderstood, and gives Koizumi a chocolate bar identical to the one she gave to Kyon - implying that her gift was a courtesy chocolate, not a love chocolate. Kyon is crestfallen, but Ryoko is unconvinced. Ryoko and Haruhi find Yuki, who states she still intends to give Kyon her chocolates and only ran away so Haruhi could give hers in private. Yuki gives her chocolate to Kyon in the courtyard. Kyon misinterprets the gift as more courtesy chocolate, so Yuki then attempts to confess her love, but is interrupted by Tsuruya. Haruhi recalls encountering Kyon three years ago. On White Day, Kyon gets Yuki and Haruhi identical gifts. Yuki is grateful while Ryoko is infuriated, since Yuki should have got a larger gift in return for her homemade love chocolate than Haruhi got for her store-bought courtesy chocolate.
| 6 | "Over the Obento" | May 8, 2015 |
The group are surprised to hear that Haruhi and Itsuki gained permission to go on school grounds long ago. Tsuruya explains the source of the misunderstandings concerning Kyon and Mikuru: The two of them met when they bumped into each other in the hall, and Kyon accidentally touched Mikuru's hand. As Ryoko helps Kyon study, Haruhi tests her with a question from Kouyouen, which utterly stumps Ryoko, so she turns the challenge over to Yuki. Yuki solves it in a manner that she can't explain coherently. Yuki and Kyon share Kyon's lunch together, and Ryoko catches Kyon feeding Yuki at her request. Haruhi announces they'll be going to a training camp.
| 7 | "Wish" "Negaigoto" (ねがいごと) | May 15, 2015 |
Haruhi decides that the Literature Club will have their training camp at a hot springs, which she justifies to the faculty as a journey in self-growth. So they can relax and enjoy the trip, she writes everyone's travel journal in advance. Ryoko tells Haruhi about Kyon feeding Yuki, and says that in light of this she fears the trip will enable a sexual encounter to occur between Kyon and Yuki. On the day of the trip, they draw straws to determine who sits next to whom on the train, only to find that all seven seats are in close proximity to each other. The group goes sightseeing, including a visit to the local temple. Haruhi exposes herself to vast amounts of incense smoke in order to increase her physical strength, and Yuki makes a wish that she will stay friends with the entire group forever.
| 8 | "The Plotting of Haruhi Suzumiya" "Suzumiya Haruhi no Hakarigoto" (涼宮ハルヒの謀) | May 22, 2015 |
The group arrive at the hotel. They bathe in a "matchmaking bath" with a small curtain, have a ping-pong tournament, do karaoke, eat dinner, and drink tea. Yuki and Kyon take another bath and spot each other through the matchmaking curtain.
| 9 | "Give Me Your Hand..." "Sono Te o..." (その手を…) | May 29, 2015 |
Haruhi rouses the other Literature Club members for a late-night game of old maid. Afterwards they go to a nearby observatory for stargazing. Ryoko admits that she fears losing her relationship with Yuki as Yuki gets closer to Kyon, but Haruhi ridicules her concerns. Kyon and Yuki hold hands as they leave the summit. After returning home from the trip, Yuki is caught off-guard by an oncoming car.
| 10 | "Someday in the Rain" "Samudei in za Rein" (サムデイ イン ザ レイン) | June 5, 2015 |
Following her near-miss with the car, Yuki starts to act strangely. She refuses to be taken to the hospital for examination and says that the collision was her fault, even though she was walking in a crosswalk. She becomes minimally responsive, and no longer plays video games, instead taking up an intense interest in reading. Kyon assesses these changes as Yuki being in a morose mood due to the protective lecture she got from Ryoko after the car accident. That night, Ryoko flatly asks Yuki "Who are you?"
| 11 | "The Disappearance of Nagato Yuki-chan I" "Nagato Yuki-chan no Shōshitsu I" (長門有希ちゃんの消失I) | June 12, 2015 |
Yuki says that while she retains all her memories, ever since the car accident she has felt no emotional connection to those memories and no identification with her previous personality. Ryoko finally persuades Yuki to go to a hospital for an examination. The doctor finds no brain damage, but says her described symptoms indicate a form of dysmnesia resulting from the car accident. Yuki says she does not want to be treated as being unwell. Ryoko respects her wishes and persuades the doctor that a hospital stay is not needed, but confides to Kyon that she wishes Yuki would go back to being her old self. Noticing her new interest in reading, Kyon takes Yuki to a library.
| 12 | "The Disappearance of Nagato Yuki-chan II" "Nagato Yuki-chan no Shōshitsu II" (長門有希ちゃんの消失II) | June 19, 2015 |
As Yuki becomes entranced by the library, she remembers that this is where she first met Kyon, who helped her get a library card. She starts developing feelings towards Kyon, leading her to suspect that the consciousness of the old Yuki is waking up inside her. Seeing more of the old Yuki's memories in her dreams, Yuki begins to worry that she'll disappear completely once the other Yuki awakens.
| 13 | "The Disappearance of Nagato Yuki-chan III" "Nagato Yuki-chan no Shōshitsu III" (長門有希ちゃんの消失III) | June 26, 2015 |
Following exams, Nagato asks Kyon and Ryoko to take her to a used book fair. Ryoko leads Yuki to realise that she has fallen in love with Kyon. Ryoko believes that though her old self has been merging back into her new self, the new Yuki's feelings for Kyon are independent from the old Yuki's feelings for him. Sensing the next time she falls asleep will be her last, Yuki spends the morning with Ryoko, keeping her disappearance a secret from her. She finishes reading the book she borrowed from the library. Kyon calls to remind her to return the book. Yuki confesses to Kyon about her feelings for him and her imminent disappearance. She falls asleep by the time Kyon reaches her. The original Yuki wakes up in her place, with no memory of anything since the car accident.
| 14 | "Her Confusion" "Kanojo no Tomadoi" (彼女の戸惑い) | July 3, 2015 |
As Yuki returns to her normal life, Ryoko is simultaneously happy and sad upon the safe return of one friend and the departure of another. Kyon begins avoiding Yuki. Haruhi makes plans to celebrate Tanabata, having Kyon and Itsuki find a bamboo branch for the occasion. As everyone writes their wishes, Haruhi confronts Kyon over why he's avoiding Yuki, deducing that the other Yuki confessed love to him. Kyon says it shouldn't matter because Yuki doesn't remember it. Seeing a parallel to how Kyon does not remember helping her write a message to space during Tanabata four years ago, Haruhi tells Kyon that even if she does not remember it, it doesn't change the fact that it is important to him.
| 15 | "His Uncertainty" "Kare no Mayoi" (彼の迷い) | July 10, 2015 |
With the arrival of summer break, the Literature Club, along with Kyon's little sister, go on a trip to the beach, staying at Tsuruya's beach house. The next day, the group head for the mountains to hunt for cicadas and have a test of courage. Asahina is nervous about the test, saying she did it before and Tsuruya set up something to scare her, which Tsuruya denies. Hearing Asahina scream, Kyon and Nagato run to the end of the test and witness Asahina passing out while pointing to a group of fireflies, which she took for will-o'-the-wisps. Kyon and Nagato continue to hold hands in the presence of the others.
| 16 | "Fireworks" "Hanabi" (花火) | July 17, 2015 |
While Kyon struggles to find a way past the awkwardness between him and Nagato, Haruhi launches the Literature Club into a packed schedule of summer vacation activities. The club participates in the summer festival, with Mikuru staring at a blender and the rest playing parlor games. When the fireworks began, Kyon drags Yuki to an inconspicuous place and tells the other Yuki how he feels about her, breaking the awkwardness between them. He realizes a moment later that Nagato couldn't hear his confession over the fireworks. Ryoko asks Kyon if he has finished his homework, a few days before school resumes.
| OVA | "I Cannot Let Summer Break End" "Owarenai Natsuyasumi" (終われない夏休み) | October 26, 2015 |
The Literature Club goes to a swimming pool, where they participate in a race to win some exotic fruits. Haruhi leads the group on a wide array of summer activities, leaving Kyon with no opportunity to do his summer homework. With only two days of summer break left, Kyon admits he has yet to start on his homework, and it emerges that Haruhi is the only one in the group to have done her homework. They have a study session at Kyon's house, where Asakura dresses up in stereotypical teacher attire to keep them motivated, but Kyon keeps making excuses to play games instead. The next morning Kyon is the only one with his homework unfinished, so he goes to Yuki's apartment to copy hers.
