= List of The Melancholy of Haruhi Suzumiya episodes =

The Melancholy of Haruhi Suzumiya Japanese DVD volume 1 cover

The Melancholy of Haruhi Suzumiya is an anime television series produced by Kyoto Animation and directed by Tatsuya Ishihara, based on the Haruhi Suzumiya series of light novels written by Nagaru Tanigawa and illustrated by Noizi Ito. The series follows a high school boy known only as Kyon who encounters Haruhi Suzumiya, an erratic girl who is unaware that she possesses unconscious abilities that can alter the very universe, as he gets dragged into joining her school club, which also consists of an alien, a time traveler, and an esper.

The first season, consisting of 14 episodes, aired in Japan between April 2 and July 2, 2006, presented in a nonlinear order in its original broadcast. The second season, consisting of 14 new episodes, was aired in chronological order between re-airings of the first season's episodes, with all 28 episodes aired between April 3 and October 9, 2009. The series was released in North America by Bandai Entertainment, and was relicensed by Funimation.

For the first season's episodes, the opening theme is "Bōken Desho Desho?" (冒険でしょでしょ？, It's an Adventure, Right? Right?) by Aya Hirano, and the ending theme is "Hare Hare Yukai" (ハレ晴レユカイ, Sunny Sunny Delight) by Haruhi Suzumiya (Hirano), Yuki Nagato (Minori Chihara), and Mikuru Asahina (Yuko Goto). For the episode titled "The Adventures of Mikuru Asahina Episode 00", the opening theme is "Koi no Mikuru Densetsu" (恋のミクル伝説, The Mikuru Legend of Love) by Asahina (Goto). For the second season's episodes, the opening theme is "Super Driver" by Hirano, and the ending theme is "Tomare!" (止マレ!, Stop!) by Suzumiya (Hirano), Nagato (Chihara) and Asahina (Goto). The television series was followed by an animated film, The Disappearance of Haruhi Suzumiya, released on February 6, 2010.

== Episode list ==
=== Season 1 ===
In the original 2006 broadcast of the first season, which aired in Japan between April 2 and July 2, 2006, the episodes were aired in a nonlinear order, with the six episodes making up the first novel's storyline intermixed with episodes based on chapters from various points in the light novels. In the next episode previews, two different numbers for the following episode are given: one number from Haruhi, who numbers the episodes according to where they fit chronologically in the plot, and one number from Kyon, who numbers the episodes in the order in which they aired. The sole exception is episode twelve, which is both the twelfth episode aired and the twelfth episode chronologically, a fact Kyon mentions in the preview. For the DVD releases, "The Adventures of Mikuru Asahina Episode 00" is used as the first episode, but otherwise the episodes follow the chronological order. The next episode previews are narrated by Yuki. In the 2009 re-airing, the series was aired in full chronological order, with episodes from the second season mixed in with the first season's episodes based on their chronology. In this airing, the first season's episodes were taken from the DVD editions, featuring visual edits and dialogue changes not featured in the original broadcast.

Note: A = TV broadcast order ("Kyon order"), B = Season one chronological order ("Haruhi order"), C = Season 1 DVD episode order, D = 2009 broadcast order (chronological for both seasons).

A	B	Title	Directed by	Written by	Original release date	2009 re-airing date	C	D
1	11	"The Adventures of Mikuru Asahina Episode 00"; Transliteration: "Asahina Mikuru no Bōken Episode 00" (Japanese: 朝比奈ミクルの冒険 Episode00)	Yutaka Yamamoto	Yutaka Yamamoto	April 2, 2006	September 18, 2009	1	25
The SOS Brigade previews their movie of questionable quality, directed by Haruhi Suzumiya with narration by Kyon. In the movie, Mikuru Asahina stars as a time-travelling waitress from the future who must engage in fights with Yuki Nagato, who is playing as an alien-magician. Mikuru has sworn to protect a young man, played by Itsuki Koizumi, but a love-triangle ensues with both Mikuru and Yuki striving for Itsuki's affections.
2	1	"The Melancholy of Haruhi Suzumiya Part One"; Transliteration: "Suzumiya Haruhi no Yūutsu I" (Japanese: 涼宮ハルヒの憂鬱I)	Tatsuya Ishihara	Tatsuya Ishihara	April 9, 2006	April 3, 2009	2	1
Enrolling in high school, Kyon is interested in his classmate Haruhi Suzumiya, who introduces herself by saying she wants to meet time-travelers, aliens, and espers. Kyon becomes the first person to solicit a normal conversation from Haruhi and inadvertently gives her the idea of forming her own club, which she names the SOS Brigade. Haruhi recruits Kyon and the timid Mikuru Asahina. Yuki Nagato, the sole member of the Literature Club, remains when the SOS Brigade occupies her clubroom for their use.
3	2	"The Melancholy of Haruhi Suzumiya Part Two"; Transliteration: "Suzumiya Haruhi no Yūutsu II" (Japanese: 涼宮ハルヒの憂鬱II)	Noriyuki Kitanohara	Yutaka Yamamoto	April 16, 2006	April 10, 2009	3	2
Wanting to improve her clubroom, Haruhi uses Mikuru to extort the Computer Research Society president and obtain a computer for the clubroom. Haruhi and Mikuru dress up in bunny costumes and hand out fliers promoting the SOS Brigade, but are stopped by the school authorities. Yuki invites Kyon to her apartment, where she reveals that she and Haruhi are not ordinary human beings.
4	7	"The Boredom of Haruhi Suzumiya"; Transliteration: "Suzumiya Haruhi no Taikutsu" (Japanese: 涼宮ハルヒの退屈)	Shinobu Okamoto	Katsuhiko Muramoto	April 23, 2006	May 15, 2009	8	7
In an effort to alleviate her boredom, Haruhi enters the SOS Brigade into a baseball tournament. Tsuruya, Taniguchi, Kunikida, and Kyon's sister are recruited to fill out the team. However, the team is hopelessly inept, and if they lose, Haruhi might destroy the world. To remedy the situation, Yuki uses her powers to alter the course of the game. After the SOS Brigade team achieves victory, Kyon, feeling guilty over knocking the opposing team out of the tournament, and having no desire to continue a baseball career, persuades Haruhi to forfeit the game.
5	3	"The Melancholy of Haruhi Suzumiya Part Three"; Transliteration: "Suzumiya Haruhi no Yūutsu III" (Japanese: 涼宮ハルヒの憂鬱III)	Kazuya Sakamoto	Yutaka Yamamoto	April 30, 2006	April 17, 2009	4	3
Yuki states she is an alien, explains the Data Integration Thought Entity, and reveals that Haruhi has unconscious powers that could destroy and recreate the world on a whim. Haruhi recruits a transfer student named Itsuki Koizumi to the SOS Brigade. On a day off from school, the group splits up to search the city for mysteries, and Mikuru tells Kyon she is a time-traveler assigned to observe Haruhi. Kyon confronts Itsuki, who admits to being an esper working for a secret Agency to manage Haruhi's power usage. He confirms Yuki and Mikuru's statements that Haruhi recreated the universe three years ago.
6	9	"Remote Island Syndrome (Part One)"; Transliteration: "Kotō Shōkōgun (Zenpen)" (Japanese: 孤島症候群(前編))	Shinobu Yoshioka	Katsuhiko Muramoto	May 7, 2006	June 5, 2009	10	10
A distant relative of Itsuki, Keiichi Tamaru, invites the SOS Brigade, along with Kyon's sister, to stay at his newly built island villa. Haruhi is excited at how the villa is a natural setting for a closed circle mystery and makes the rest of the SOS Brigade nervous by speculating on murders that could happen during the trip. On their first day there, they enjoy the facilities and play on the beach. On the second day, they are kept inside by a storm and play in the games room. The next morning, Keiichi's brother Yutaka Tamaru goes missing, and the SOS Brigade members find Keiichi seemingly dead in his room, in apparent fulfillment of Haruhi's wish for a closed circle mystery.
7	8	"Mystérique Sign"; Transliteration: "Misuterikku Sain" (Japanese: ミステリックサイン)	Taichi Ishidate	Atsushi Itō	May 14, 2006	May 29, 2009	9	9
Haruhi has Kyon add a logo of her design to the SOS Brigade website. A student named Emiri Kimidori asks the SOS Brigade to find her boyfriend, the Computer Research Society president, who has gone missing. When they fail to immediately find him at his apartment, Haruhi grows bored of the case and leaves. The others discover that he is trapped inside a data entity in a "sealed reality", also known as a "closed space". Yuki and Itsuki defeat the data entity and rescue the president. They realize that the logo Haruhi designed was the catalyst for the entity. The president states that he has no girlfriend, leading Kyon to suspect Yuki engineered the case to stave off Haruhi's boredom.
8	10	"Remote Island Syndrome (Part Two)"; Transliteration: "Kotō Shōkōgun (Kōhen)" (Japanese: 孤島症候群(後編))	Tomoe Aratani	Fumihiko Shimo	May 21, 2006	June 12, 2009	11	11
Kyon and Haruhi head outside to confirm Yuutaka took the boat, making him an obvious suspect in Keiichi's murder, and Haruhi spies a shadowy figure. Haruhi comes to a startling conclusion about the murder, but refrains from sharing it. Itsuki tells Kyon that she has probably concluded that the SOS Brigade accidentally killed Keiichi when they broke into his room. However, further deductions lead Haruhi to discover that the "murder" was a hoax that Itsuki and Keiichi came up with to entertain the guests. Itsuki confides to Kyon their purpose was to prevent Haruhi from using her power to cause a real murder, but Kyon asserts that it is against Haruhi's nature to wish for someone to die.
9	14	"Someday in the Rain"; Transliteration: "Samudei in za Rein" (Japanese: サムデイ イン ザ レイン)	Noriyuki Kitanohara	Nagaru Tanigawa	May 28, 2006	October 9, 2009	14	28
With winter setting in, Haruhi orders Kyon to pick up a heater. With him gone, she takes pictures of Mikuru in various costumes for the movie's DVD cover, Itsuki helps, and Yuki is left alone to read. When Kyon returns, he finds only Yuki in the club room and falls asleep waiting for the others. He is woken by Haruhi (the only other student who hasn't gone home) putting her cardigan on him to keep him warm. Haruhi is mortified at being caught, but Kyon notices he was already covered with another cardigan, likely Yuki's. Haruhi is in a good mood as she and Kyon share an umbrella on the walk home through the rain.
10	4	"The Melancholy of Haruhi Suzumiya Part Four"; Transliteration: "Suzumiya Haruhi no Yūutsu IV" (Japanese: 涼宮ハルヒの憂鬱IV)	Taichi Ishidate	Tatsuya Ishihara	June 4, 2006	April 24, 2009	5	4
Kyon finds a mysterious letter in his locker directing him to come to the classroom, where Ryoko Asakura, the class president, confronts him. Also an alien, Ryoko attempts to kill Kyon in order to provoke a reaction from Haruhi. She is stopped by Yuki, who nullifies Ryoko's data, which is reported as her transferring out of school. The sudden transfer arouses Haruhi's interest. Kyon meets Mikuru's older self, who has traveled from the future to tell him that Snow White is the clue essential to his future.
11	13	"The Day of Sagittarius"; Transliteration: "Iteza no Hi" (Japanese: 射手座の日)	Yasuhiro Takemoto	Shoji Gatoh	June 11, 2006	October 2, 2009	13	27
The Computer Research Society challenge the SOS Brigade to a computer game they created for the cultural festival, The Day of Sagittarius III. The stakes are the computer Haruhi extorted from them earlier in the year or computers for all the SOS Brigade members if they win. During the contest, Yuki finds out the Computer Research Society cheated by disabling the fog of war on their side and hacks the code to restore it, resulting in the SOS Brigade's victory. Awed by Yuki's hacking skills, the Computer Research Society invites her to spend time with them.
12	12	"Live Alive"; Transliteration: "Raibu Araibu" (Japanese: ライブアライブ)	Yutaka Yamamoto	Yutaka Yamamoto	June 18, 2006	September 25, 2009	12	26
On the day of the school's cultural festival, Yuki does fortune-telling, and Itsuki stars in a play, Mikuru and Tsuruya run a yakisoba café, and Kyon, recovering from his all-nighter working on the SOS Brigade's film, wanders sleepily among the exhibits. Haruhi and Yuki fill in for a rock band on vocals and guitar when two of the members have last-minute medical situations. The performance is a smashing success, and the band thanks Haruhi effusively. Afterward, Haruhi is restless. Kyon thinks that Haruhi is rethinking her life due to the new experience of being appreciated by others, but it turns out she just wants to start up her own rock band.
13	5	"The Melancholy of Haruhi Suzumiya Part Five"; Transliteration: "Suzumiya Haruhi no Yūutsu V" (Japanese: 涼宮ハルヒの憂鬱V)	Noriyuki Kitanohara	Fumihiko Shimo	June 25, 2006	May 1, 2009	6	5
Kyon is dragged into helping Haruhi investigate Ryoko's strange transfer. During the search, Haruhi tells Kyon about her childhood and how she became obsessed with paranormal phenomena in an effort to overcome her feelings of insignificance. Itsuki later tells Kyon about the theory of the anthropic principle correlating with Haruhi, believing Kyon is the reason Haruhi was able to wish extraterrestrial beings to exist. He brings Kyon into a sealed reality, where he and his fellow espers destroy a giant blue entity subconsciously created by Haruhi.
14	6	"The Melancholy of Haruhi Suzumiya Part Six"; Transliteration: "Suzumiya Haruhi no Yūutsu VI" (Japanese: 涼宮ハルヒの憂鬱VI)	Tatsuya Ishihara	Fumihiko Shimo	July 2, 2006	May 8, 2009	7	6
One night, Haruhi's power is activated, trapping her and Kyon in a sealed reality at their school. While Haruhi investigates, Kyon is greeted by Itsuki, who tells him that Haruhi is creating a new world, retaining only Kyon from the old one. Yuki contacts Kyon via computer and gives the hint of Sleeping Beauty as a means to stop Haruhi. As a giant, celestial being appears and begins to destroy the school and surrounding area, Kyon kisses Haruhi, returning them both to the old world. Kyon believes the whole experience to have been a dream, but the next day at school sees Haruhi wearing her hair in a ponytail, in accordance with a wish he expressed in the sealed reality.

=== Season 2 ===
The second season was aired in Japan as part of a re-airing of the whole series, with the new episodes mixed in with the first season's episodes based on their chronology. The re-airing aired between April 3 and October 9, 2009, with the second season episodes appearing between May 22 and September 11, 2009. In DVD releases, the new episodes are collectively referred to as the second season. The English-dubbed version of the second season episodes of the anime was aired on Animax Asia and its subsidiaries from April 6, 2011.

Note: D = 2009 broadcast order (chronological for both seasons), E = Season 2 DVD episode order

D	Title	Directed by	Written by	Original release date	English air date	E
8	"Bamboo Leaf Rhapsody"; Transliteration: "Sasa no Ha Rapusodi" (Japanese: 笹の葉ラプソディ)	Yasuhiro Takemoto	Fumihiko Shimo	May 22, 2009	April 6, 2011	1
On Tanabata, Mikuru takes Kyon three years into the past. There she is put to sleep by her future self, who tells Kyon to help out a certain someone. Kyon sees a young Haruhi sneaking into her middle school and helps her draw strange symbols on the athletics grounds, keeping his identity secret. Haruhi questions him about strange beings; he says they might exist because he knows someone like her at his school. After Haruhi leaves, Kyon wakes Mikuru, who has had her time travel device taken. The two visit Yuki, who helps them return by having them sleep in a time stasis field in her apartment. Kyon wonders if he was the one who inspired Haruhi to attend his high school and search for strange beings.
12	"Endless Eight I"; Transliteration: "Endoresu Eito I" (Japanese: エンドレスエイト I)	Mitsuyoshi Yoneda	Shoji Gatoh	June 19, 2009	April 13, 2011	2
Haruhi summons the SOS Brigade to make the most of summer vacation with a whirlwind tour of summer activities. They play at a swimming pool, attend Bon Festival, shoot off fireworks, hunt for bugs, work a part-time job, stargaze, play at a batting range, watch a fireworks display, compete in a fishing tournament, explore a cemetery, see a blockbuster, go to the beach, go bowling, and sing karaoke. Having gone through her entire list, Haruhi still seems unsatisfied but gives them the last day of August off. Though Kyon tries to do his neglected summer homework, he gives in to distraction and goes to bed without finishing it.
13	"Endless Eight II"; Transliteration: "Endoresu Eito II" (Japanese: エンドレスエイト II)	Tomoe Aratani	Yasuhiro Takemoto	June 26, 2009	April 13, 2011	3
Haruhi takes the SOS Brigade on a whirlwind tour of summer activities almost identical to the previous episode. Kyon is wracked by déjà vu, and when Mikuru finds she can't return to the future, Itsuki figures out that Haruhi has put the last two weeks of August into an infinite loop. Yuki reports that the loop has repeated 15,498 times, though with variations on individual events. At their meeting in a restaurant on August 30, Kyon realizes the truth in Itsuki's theory that Haruhi is repeating summer vacation because there is one more thing she hopes to do. He fails to think of anything he can do to satisfy her and resigns to the loop continuing.
14	"Endless Eight III"; Transliteration: "Endoresu Eito III" (Japanese: エンドレスエイト III)	Yoshiji Kigami	Yasuhiro Takemoto	July 3, 2009	April 20, 2011	4
The same events in the previous episode once again unfold with slight variations. In this 15,499th loop, Kyon and the others once again fail to discover how to escape the endless summer.
15	"Endless Eight IV"; Transliteration: "Endoresu Eito IV" (Japanese: エンドレスエイト IV)	Noriko Takao	Yasuhiro Takemoto	July 10, 2009	April 20, 2011	5
The time loop continues for the 15,513th time. Kyon mentally senses an even greater familiarity with events and places from previous cycles.
16	"Endless Eight V"; Transliteration: "Endoresu Eito V" (Japanese: エンドレスエイト V)	Tatsuya Ishihara	Yasuhiro Takemoto	July 17, 2009	April 27, 2011	6
The time loop continues for the 15,521st time, with slight variations.
17	"Endless Eight VI"; Transliteration: "Endoresu Eito VI" (Japanese: エンドレスエイト VI)	Noriyuki Kitanohara	Yasuhiro Takemoto	July 24, 2009	April 27, 2011	7
The time loop continues for the 15,524th time.
18	"Endless Eight VII"; Transliteration: "Endoresu Eito VII" (Japanese: エンドレスエイト VII)	Taichi Ishidate	Yasuhiro Takemoto	July 31, 2009	May 4, 2011	8
The time loop continues for the 15,527th time. The scene where Kyon answers Haruhi's call, the scene in which Kyon notices Yuki at the pool, and the scene where Haruhi says she left the last day of summer open just in case all loop twice.
19	"Endless Eight VIII"; Transliteration: "Endoresu Eito VIII" (Japanese: エンドレスエイト VIII)	Mitsuyoshi Yoneda	Katsuhiko Muramoto	August 7, 2009	May 4, 2011	9
The loop continues for the 15,532nd time, but as Haruhi leaves on August 30, Kyon beckons the SOS Brigade to finish their summer homework together. Haruhi berates him for giving the group orders, but decides to come even though she already finished her homework in July. With Haruhi satisfied that she made the most of her summer, Kyon finally wakes up on September 1 to embrace a new school term. Itsuki hypothesizes that because of Haruhi's superior intellect, she had never shared school work with friends before.
20	"The Sigh of Haruhi Suzumiya Part One"; Transliteration: "Suzumiya Haruhi no Tameiki I" (Japanese: 涼宮ハルヒの溜息I)	Naoko Yamada	Nagaru Tanigawa	August 14, 2009	May 11, 2011	10
Upon the start of a new term, North High School is preparing for the annual school cultural festival. Displeased with the class decision on a questionnaire and with a film she saw the previous night, Haruhi commits the club to an independent film with Mikuru and Itsuki as the protagonists, Yuki as the villain, and Kyon doing menial jobs such as cameraman and gofer. Haruhi negotiates with shop owners for free equipment, obtaining an expensive camcorder and two airsoft guns.
21	"The Sigh of Haruhi Suzumiya Part Two"; Transliteration: "Suzumiya Haruhi no Tameiki II" (Japanese: 涼宮ハルヒの溜息II)	Noriko Takao	Katsuhiko Muramoto	August 21, 2009	May 11, 2011	11
Preparation for the SOS Brigade's short film continues, with the main characters' roles eerily matching their actual nature. On the first day of filming, the club shoots two commercials advertising their sponsors before filming several scenes in a park, at which point Kyon learns that Haruhi doesn't have a written script and is planning on ironing out the plot in the editing phase.
22	"The Sigh of Haruhi Suzumiya Part Three"; Transliteration: "Suzumiya Haruhi no Tameiki III" (Japanese: 涼宮ハルヒの溜息III)	Tatsuya Ishihara	Atsushi Itō	August 28, 2009	May 18, 2011	12
Haruhi insists on a tight filming schedule, including working on Saturday and Sunday. Displeased with the battle sequence, she conjures the idea of Mikuru shooting laser beams from the blue contact lens on her left eye. During the filming of the scene, Mikuru actually fires deadly beams. Yuki protects Kyon and tackles Mikuru to remove the contact lens and hide it from Haruhi, who adapts the film's plot to account for Mikuru's not having the contact lens in every scene. Recognizing that Haruhi's wish for a laser beam caused the incident, Yuki injects nanomachines to counter the effect on Mikuru. Haruhi adds Tsuruya, Taniguchi, and Kunikida as extras in the film.
23	"The Sigh of Haruhi Suzumiya Part Four"; Transliteration: "Suzumiya Haruhi no Tameiki IV" (Japanese: 涼宮ハルヒの溜息IV)	Noriyuki Kitanohara	Yasuhiro Takemoto	September 4, 2009	May 18, 2011	13
As the SOS Brigade continues filming, Haruhi has Mikuru thrown in a polluted lake by the extras. Tsuruya offers her place as a filming location, where Haruhi dresses Mikuru in a revealing nightgown and spikes her drink with alcohol to help her "act better" in a romance scene with Itsuki. Furious at Haruhi's treatment of Mikuru, Kyon demands she stop and argues with her; when she insists on having her way, Kyon tries to hit her, only to be stopped by Itsuki. Haruhi becomes depressed by her falling out with Kyon. After becoming irritated by Taniguchi's rude comments about the film, Kyon tells Haruhi he is newly resolved to finish the film, which reinvigorates her. As filming resumes, her powers start causing cherry blossoms to bloom out of season.
24	"The Sigh of Haruhi Suzumiya Part Five"; Transliteration: "Suzumiya Haruhi no Tameiki V" (Japanese: 涼宮ハルヒの溜息V)	Taichi Ishidate	Tatsuya Ishihara	September 11, 2009	May 25, 2011	14
Deciding Yuki needs a familiar for her role, Haruhi picks up a stray male calico cat, naming it Shamisen. When Haruhi leaves, Shamisen starts talking as a result of Haruhi's power. Itsuki suggests reminding Haruhi that her movie is fictional before reality incurs further damage. Mikuru and Yuki share their independent views about Haruhi. Kyon convinces Haruhi to add a disclaimer over the credits saying it is a work of fiction. After the filming, Kyon and Haruhi remain in the club room overnight to do the editing. They both fall asleep, but awake the next day to find the movie has been completed. In a flashback to May, Kyon tells Haruhi the truth about the other club members, but she does not believe him.
