= The Disappearance of Haruhi Suzumiya =

- Theatrical release poster
- Directed by: Tatsuya Ishihara (Chief); Yasuhiro Takemoto
- Screenplay by: Fumihiko Shimo
- Based on: The Disappearance of Haruhi Suzumiya by Nagaru Tanigawa
- Produced by: Atsushi Itō; Hideaki Hatta
- Starring: Aya Hirano; Tomokazu Sugita; Minori Chihara; Yūko Gotō; Daisuke Ono; Natsuko Kuwatani; Yuki Matsuoka; Minoru Shiraishi; Megumi Matsumoto; Sayaka Aoki
- Cinematography: Ryūta Nakagami
- Edited by: Kengo Shigemura
- Music by: Satoru Kōsaki; Kakeru Ishihama; Keigo Hoashi; Ryūichi Takada; Erik Satie
- Production company: Kyoto Animation
- Distributed by: Kadokawa Shoten; KlockWorx
- Release date: February 6, 2010
- Running time: 162 minutes
- Country: Japan
- Language: Japanese
- Box office: ¥830 million (Japan)

The Disappearance of Haruhi Suzumiya (涼宮ハルヒの消失, Suzumiya Haruhi no Shōshitsu) is a 2010 Japanese animated science fiction mystery drama film based on the fourth Haruhi Suzumiya light novel of the same name written by Nagaru Tanigawa. It was produced by Kyoto Animation, written by Fumihiko Shimo and directed by Tatsuya Ishihara and Yasuhiro Takemoto. It was released in Japanese theaters on February 6, 2010, and on DVD and Blu-ray Disc on December 18, 2010.

The film has been licensed by Bandai Entertainment in North America and Manga Entertainment in the UK. With a length of 162 minutes, the film was the second-longest animated film at the time of its release (only surpassed by Final Yamato, with its 70mm print release being only one minute longer).

== Plot ==
Following on from the events of The Melancholy of Haruhi Suzumiya television series, the story takes place in December. The SOS Brigade, led by Haruhi Suzumiya, makes plans to have a nabe party for Christmas. However, on the morning of December 18, Kyon arrives at school and finds that the nature of his reality has changed; Haruhi and Itsuki Koizumi are missing, Ryoko Asakura has mysteriously returned, Mikuru Asahina does not recognize him and Yuki Nagato is an ordinary human. Only Kyon is aware that everything is different, and no one else remembers Haruhi or the SOS Brigade.

Searching the SOS Brigade clubroom, Kyon finds a bookmark left by Yuki before everything was changed, telling him to gather "keys" to run a program. Not knowing what the message means, he accepts a dinner invitation from the new Yuki, who reveals a fondness for him because, in this reality, he once helped her get a library card. Asakura prepares dinner for them, and warns Kyon to be mindful of Yuki's feelings.

On December 20, Kyon learns from Taniguchi that Haruhi still exists, and simply went to a different high school; Taniguchi knows of her because they went to the same middle school. By revealing his identity to her as 'John Smith', an alias he used when he traveled back in time to assist a young Haruhi, Kyon convinces Haruhi of his story. Excited by the concept of the SOS Brigade, Haruhi assembles the club's members and brings them to the club room. These prove to be the required "keys" for Yuki's program.

Kyon activates the program, which sends him back in time to the Tanabata of three years ago. The adult Mikuru meets with him and takes him to the past Yuki, who says that in the early hours of December 18 Yuki stole Haruhi's powers from her and used them to alter the world such that no paranormal beings or powers exist. She attributes her actions to an accumulation of errors, which Kyon interprets as weariness from having to monitor Haruhi's behavior and protect Kyon. (Note: Why Kyon's memories were unaffected by the change remains open to speculation or interpretation.) Yuki gives Kyon an uninstall program which needs to be shot at her right after the change. Traveling to December 18, they find Yuki. Kyon reflects on his choice to undo the change, reaching the epiphany that he enjoys being with Haruhi Suzumiya and the SOS Brigade and thinks the world is more interesting and fun with paranormal beings in it. He tries to install the program into Yuki but is stabbed by Ryoko, who Yuki altered to be her personal bodyguard and perceives Kyon as a threat to Yuki.

He is rescued by future counterparts of Yuki, Mikuru and himself, and wakes up on December 21 in a hospital. The world is back to normal, but Kyon has been in a coma since falling down the stairs on December 18. Yuki mentions to Kyon that the Data Integration Thought Entity is considering decommissioning her, since continued accumulation of errors is inevitable and will likely lead to further destructive behavior. Kyon tells her to let them know that if they ever try such a thing, he can tell Haruhi about him being John Smith and have her alter reality so aliens would cease to exist. As December 24 comes, Kyon postpones going back in time to save himself from Asakura and joins in on the Christmas party.

== Voice cast ==
Character	Japanese	English
Haruhi Suzumiya	Aya Hirano	Wendee Lee
Kyon	Tomokazu Sugita	Crispin Freeman
Yuki Nagato	Minori Chihara	Michelle Ruff
Mikuru Asahina	Yūko Gotō	Stephanie Sheh
Itsuki Koizumi	Daisuke Ono	Johnny Yong Bosch
Ryoko Asakura	Natsuko Kuwatani	Bridget Hoffman
Tsuruya	Yuki Matsuoka	Kari Wahlgren
Taniguchi	Minoru Shiraishi	Sam Riegel
Kunikida	Megumi Matsumoto	Brianne Siddall
Kyon's little sister	Sayaka Aoki	Kari Wahlgren

== Production ==
The Disappearance of Haruhi Suzumiya, the fourth volume in The Melancholy of Haruhi Suzumiya light novel series, was first planned to be adapted as part of the second season of the anime show. The studio, Kyoto Animation, started production of the new season in June 2007. The production team decided not to worry about the runtime of Disappearance until the script was finished and the storyboards were at an advanced stage, in order to give ample time to all the necessary scenes; they ended up with seven manuscripts for a provisional total of seven episodes. At an unknown point in time, the plans changed to adapt The Disappearance of Haruhi Suzumiya as a film instead. This led to the film being 162 minutes long, the second-longest animated film at the time. Director Tatsuya Ishihara expressed that he wished the film had been a bit longer to adapt even more scenes from the novel, but ultimately was satisfied with the number of scenes they were able to leave in.

Directors Tatsuya Ishihara and Yasuhiro Takemoto decided to employ little camera movement to emphasize the atmosphere of the scenes and Kyon's loneliness. Noriko Takao joined the directors in drawing the storyboards at her own request. Both directors expressed that it was helpful to have a woman's point of view during the creation process, which was particularly different in regard to the character Yuki Nagato. The storyboards ended up divided into six parts, A-F, with Ishihara and Takemoto splitting the beginning and end, and Takao doing the C and D parts. They discussed the dialogue extensively to make it sound as true to the characters as possible.

Ishihara, Takemoto and Takao said that they spent the most time discussing the depiction of the characters Ryoko Asakura and Itsuki Koizumi. They considered these characters, in the narrative of the film, as people who "hadn't been chosen." In particular, Takemoto asked Koizumi's voice actor, Daisuke Ono, to express the sadness of a sad clown. Takao was the main responsible for illustrating the "people not chosen" aspect in the storyboards. Contrarily, they wanted Haruhi Suzumiya's few scenes to create a "sparkling" feeling.

The studio employed techniques like 3DCG and photography to increase the level of detail in the layouts when the camera panned out far enough that doing it with traditional drawing methods from scratch would be too difficult.

Each of the A-F parts of the film had a different animation director that would check the work, which would then go to the director, then to chief animation director Futoshi Nishiya, and lastly to super chief animation director Shoko Ikeda. Nishiya put the most care into addressing the posing, gestures, and facial expressions, while Ikeda's role was to ensure the characters matched their design. For a better result, Ikeda gathered the animation directors at the beginning of the film's production to explain the details of each character design, what to bring out, and what to avoid. She also gave advice on how to avoid an excessive level of realistic detail to allow for more flexibility in the characters' expressions and body postures during the dramatic scenes. Nishiya found it the toughest to work on Kyon due to the wide range of emotions he goes through in the film, whereas Ikeda found it more difficult to work on Nagato Yuki due to the unusually high number of gestures for the character and the delicacy in her emotions.

To better convey the emotional development of the protagonist Kyon throughout the film, instead of recording the voice acting for the scenes where all characters are together first, which is the usual method, The Disappearance of Haruhi Suzumiya was recorded in the order the story develops. Sound director Youta Tsuruoka was highly pleased with the result, praising Kyon's voice actor Tomokazu Sugita for his performance. As for himself, Tsuruoka said that it was a challenge to pack the entire length of the film with the right sounds.

The writer of the novel series, Nagaru Tanigawa, gave feedback during the scriptwriting process. Tanigawa also conceived the epilogue exclusive to the film and wrote the lyrics of the ending song. Producer Atsushi Itō suggested that the ending song be a cappella.

== Release ==
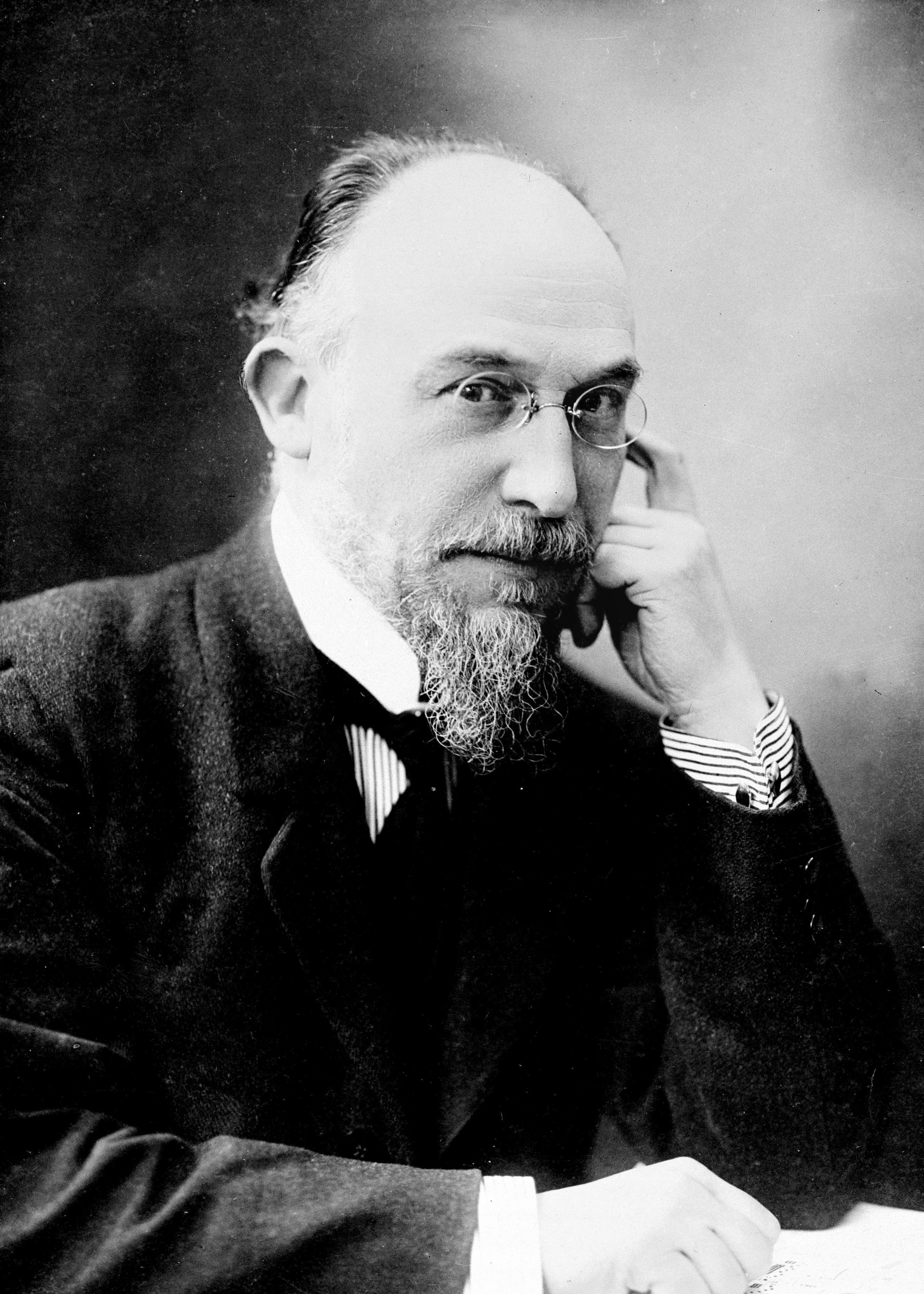
Several compositions from Erik Satie are used in the film.

On December 18, 2007, the official website of The Melancholy of Haruhi Suzumiya anime series, haruhi.tv, was replaced by a fake 404 error with five form input fields, a reference to the pivotal date in The Disappearance of Haruhi Suzumiya, the fourth volume in the light novel series. The story of The Disappearance of Haruhi Suzumiya did not appear in the 2009 re-airing of the anime series The Melancholy of Haruhi Suzumiya, which included previously un-aired episodes adapted from the second, third and fifth novels. However, at the close of the 2009 season on October 8, 2009, a 30-second teaser trailer showing Yuki Nagato was aired, revealing that The Disappearance of Haruhi Suzumiya would actually be a film, set for a February 6, 2010, release. A one-minute promotional video was released in December 2009. The film was released on BD/DVD, in regular and limited editions on December 18, 2010, in Japan.

The film was licensed for North America distribution by Bandai Entertainment. English-subtitled screenings began running in San Francisco's Viz Theater from May 21, 2010, and were followed by a screening at the Laemmle's Sunset theater in Hollywood on June 24, 2010 and a theatrical run in Hawaii in June 2010 through Consolidated Theatres and Artisan Gateway as part of their Spotlight Asia Films program. An English-language version has been co-produced by Bang Zoom! Entertainment and was released on DVD and Blu-ray Disc in North America on September 20, 2011. Manga Entertainment released it in the UK on DVD on November 7, 2011, though a planned 2012 Blu-ray release had been cancelled. Madman Entertainment released the film on DVD and Blu-ray in Australia and New Zealand on November 16, 2011. The film had its European premiere on October 17, 2010, at the Scotland Loves Anime event in Edinburgh. Animax Asia has aired the film.

=== Music ===
The film's theme song is "Yasashii Bōkyaku" (優しい忘却; "Tender Oblivion") by Minori Chihara, the single of which was released on February 24, 2010. The opening theme is "Bōken Desho Desho?" by Aya Hirano. The film's original soundtrack was released on January 27, 2010. The soundtrack also contains music from French composer Erik Satie, including Gymnopédies, Gnossiennes and his composition "Je te veux", which were used in the film. The soundtrack is performed by the Eminence Symphony Orchestra and was produced by Satoru Kōsaki.

Original soundtrack disc 1
No.	Title	Music	Length
1.	"Itsumo no Fūkei kara Hajimaru Monogatari" (いつもの風景から始まる物語 The Story Begins With the Usual Scenery)	Satoru Kōsaki	3:51
2.	"SOS-dan Christmas Party" (SOS団クリスマスパーティ SOS Brigade Christmas Party)	Satoru Kōsaki	2:24
3.	"Dotabata Time" (ドタバタ・タイム Noisy Time)	Satoru Kōsaki	1:03
4.	"Nichijō no Saki ni Machiukeru Mono" (日常の先に待ち受けるもの Everyday Things That Lie Ahead)	Keigo Hoashi	0:51
5.	"Asakura Ryōko to Iu Josei" (朝倉涼子という女性 The Woman Named Ryoko Asakura)	Ryūichi Takada	2:59
6.	"Fuan kara Kyōfu e" (不安から恐怖へ From Anxiety to Fear)	Ryūichi Takada	1:44
7.	"Uragirareta Kitai" (裏切られた期待 Betrayed Expectations)	Keigo Hoashi	2:48
8.	"Kodoku Sekai no Hirogari" (孤独世界の広がり Lonely World's Spread)	Keigo Hoashi	3:14
9.	"Kankyō Henka no Zehi" (環境変化の是非 Pros and Cons of Environmental Changes)	Satoru Kōsaki	2:56
10.	"Suzumiya Haruhi no Tegakari" (涼宮ハルヒの手がかり The Trail of Haruhi Suzumiya)	Kakeru Ishihama	1:27
11.	"Hayaru Kokoro to Mae ni Denai Ashi" (はやる心と前に出ない足 Impatient Spirit and Immovable Feet)	Satoru Kōsaki	1:14
12.	"Tsunagatta Kioku" (つながった記憶 Memories Tied Together)	Satoru Kōsaki	2:33
13.	"SOS-dan Futatabi" (SOS団再び SOS Brigade Once Again)	Satoru Kōsaki	1:56
14.	"Ready?"	Ryūichi Takada	4:13
15.	"Ano Hi no Kioku o Oikakete" (あの日の記憶を追いかけて Chasing the Memory of That Day)	Satoru Kōsaki	1:27
16.	"Michibiku Josei no Kataru Kotoba" (導く女性の語る言葉 Having Words With the Female Guide)	Keigo Hoashi	2:26
17.	"Mirai e no Ashiato" (未来への足跡 Footprints From the Future)	Keigo Hoashi	1:53
18.	"Gymnopédie No. 2" (ジムノペディ 第2番 Jimunopedi Dai Ni-ban)	Erik Satie	2:55
19.	"Nagato Yuki no Kokoro ni Aru Mono" (長門有希の心にあるもの In the Heart of Yuki Nagato)	Keigo Hoashi	2:88
20.	"Jikoishiki no Kakunin" (自己意識の確認 Awakening Self-Consciousness)	Keigo Hoashi	2:44
21.	"Rekishi no Tenkanten" (歴史の転換点 Converging Point of History)	Ryūichi Takada	3:18
22.	"Futatabi Deaeta Dan'intachi" (再び出逢えた団員たち Meeting Brigade Members Once Again)	Satoru Kōsaki	5:01
23.	"Itsumo no Fūkei de Owaru Monogatari" (いつもの風景で終わる物語 The Story Ends With the Usual Scenery)	Satoru Kōsaki	3:16

Original soundtrack disc 2
No.	Title	Music	Length
1.	"Gymnopédie No. 1" (ジムノペディ 第1番 Jimunopedi Dai Ichi-ban)	Erik Satie	3:17
2.	"Gymnopédie No. 2" (ジムノペディ 第2番 Jimunopedi Dai Ni-ban)	Erik Satie	2:50
3.	"Gymnopédie No. 3" (ジムノペディ 第3番 Jimunopedi Dai San-ban)	Erik Satie	2:27
4.	"Gnossienne No. 1" (グノシエンヌ 第1番 Gunoshiennu Dai Ichi-ban)	Erik Satie	3:24
5.	"Gnossienne No. 2" (グノシエンヌ 第2番 Gunoshiennu Dai Ni-ban)	Erik Satie	2:17
6.	"Gnossienne No. 3" (グノシエンヌ 第3番 Gunoshiennu Dai San-ban)	Erik Satie	2:56
7.	"Je te veux" (ジュ・トゥ・ヴー I Want You)	Erik Satie	5:15

== Related media ==
A spin-off manga written and illustrated by Puyo titled The Disappearance of Nagato Yuki-chan (長門有希ちゃんの消失, Nagato Yuki-chan no Shōshitsu) was serialized in Kadokawa Shoten's Young Ace between July 2009 and August 2016. An anime adaptation by Satelight aired between April and July 2015. A visual novel video game titled The Reminiscence of Haruhi Suzumiya (涼宮ハルヒの追想, Suzumiya Haruhi no Tsuisō) was released on May 12, 2011, by Bandai Namco Games for the PlayStation 3 and PlayStation Portable. The game's story takes place shortly after the events of the film.

== Reception ==
With the film's release on February 6, 2010, on 24 screens in Japan, it placed in the top 10 for Japanese box office sales in its first weekend, and earned an estimated 200 million yen in its first week. The film won the Best Theatrical Film award at the 2010 Animation Kobe Awards. The BD version sold over 77,000 copies in its first week, topping the Oricon charts, while placing fourth in the DVD charts with 19,667 copies sold. Minori Chihara won the Best Singing Award at the fifth annual Seiyu Awards held in 2011 in Tokyo for her performance of the "Yasashii Bōkyaku" ending theme song.

In Thailand, the film was forced by the nationwide floods to be screened only at the Lido Theatre, Siam Square, Bangkok, and only for one day, November 6, 2011. However, it is reported that the tickets were immediately sold out on the first day of booking. After the showing, Rose Media & Entertainment, the Thai Haruhi Suzumiya franchisee, also held an auction of the Haruhi goods, including limited BDs and DVDs, and donated all the earnings to the flood relief efforts.
