= Yuki Matsuoka =

Japanese actress, voice actress and narrator (born 1970)

- 松岡 由貴
- Born: September 13, 1970 (age 55); Higashisumiyoshi-ku, Osaka, Japan
- Education: Otemae Women's University
- Occupations: Actress; voice actress; narrator
- Years active: 1979–present
- Agent: Production Baobab
- Height: 156 cm (5 ft 1 in)

Yuki Matsuoka (松岡 由貴, Matsuoka Yuki; born September 13, 1970) is a Japanese actress, voice actress and narrator. She graduated from Otemae Women's University in Nishinomiya. She is affiliated with Production Baobab. Her notable roles include Ayumu "Osaka" Kasuga in Azumanga Daioh, Orihime Inoue in Bleach, Aiko Senoo in Ojamajo Doremi. Tsuruya in The Melancholy of Haruhi Suzumiya, and Alisa Bosconovitch in Tekken.

== Filmography ==
=== Main current roles ===
Year	Title	Roles	Series
1999–2002	Ojamajo Doremi	Aiko Senoo	TV & Movie Series
2001–2002	Azumanga Daioh	Ayumu "Osaka" Kasuga	TV & Movie
2004–2012, 2022–present	Bleach / Bleach: Thousand-Year Blood War	Orihime Inoue	TV, Movies, OVA & Video games
2005–2011, 2017	Negima! (2005–2011), UQ Holder! (2017)	Evangeline A.K. McDowell/Yukihime	Negima (TV Series & Movie), UQ Holder! (TV & OVA)
2006, 2009	The Melancholy of Haruhi Suzumiya	Tsuruya	2006 & 2009 (Renewal)
2008–present	Tekken	Alisa Bosconovitch	Video Game Series (Main/Spin-off), Movie & Street Fighter X Tekken/Project X Zone/Tekken Revolution

=== Anime series ===
Year	Title	Roles	Series
1997	Yume no Crayon Oukoku	Shakatick	
1999–2000	Ojamajo Doremi	Aiko Senoo	
2000–2001	Ojamajo Doremi #	Aiko Senoo	
2001–2002	Mo~tto! Ojamajo Doremi	Aiko Senoo	
2001	Cosmic Baton Girl Comet-san	Nene Toukichi	
2001	Haré+Guu	Mary	
2002	Ojamajo Doremi Dokka~n!	Aiko Senoo	
2002	Magical Shopping Arcade Abenobashi	Arumi Asahina	
2002	Azumanga Daioh	Ayumu "Osaka" Kasuga	
2002	Hamtaro	Hitomi	
2002–2003	Petite Princess Yucie	Glenda	
2002–2003	GetBackers	Otowa Madoka	
2003	.hack//Legend of the Twilight	Mireille	
2003	Stellvia of the Universe	Arisa Glennorth, Mia Glennorth (Arisa's sister)	
2003	Mermaid Melody Pichi Pichi Pitch	Eriru	
2003	Scrapped Princess	Seness Lulu Giat	
2003	Da Capo (visual novel)	Mako Mizukoshi	
2003	Maburaho	Kuriko Kazetsubaki	
2004	Elfen Lied	Nana	
2004	Futari wa Pretty Cure	young Sanae Yukishiro	
2004	Saiyuki Gunlock	Shudou/Junhua	
2004	Magical Girl Lyrical Nanoha	Amy Limiette	
2004–2012	Bleach	Orihime Inoue, Ichigo Kurosaki (young)	
2004	Grenadier - The Senshi of Smiles	Mikan Kurenai	
2004	Girls Bravo	Lisa Fukuyama	
2005	Negima!	Evangeline A.K. McDowell	
2005	Glass Mask	Yuki Egawa	
2005	Best Student Council	Rein Tsunomoto	
2005	Trinity Blood	Seth Nightroad	
2005	Da Capo Second Season	Mako Mizukoshi	
2005	Magical Girl Lyrical Nanoha A's	Amy Limiette	
2005	Hell Girl	Chie Tanuma	
2005	Girls Bravo second season	Lisa Fukuyama	
2006	Hanbun no Tsuki ga Noboru Sora	Female reporter, Miyuki Mizutani	
2006	The Melancholy of Haruhi Suzumiya	Tsuruya	
2006	Otogi-Jūshi Akazukin	Lily	
2006	Chocotto Sister	Marumo Tamami	
2006	Fushigiboshi no Futagohime Gyu!	Female Student	
2006–2007	Negima!?	Evangeline A.K. McDowell	
2006	Bakumatsu Kikansetsu Irohanihoheto	Kobako	
2006	Inukami!	Sandan	
2006	Nanatsuiro Drops	Yuuki Nona	
2007	Kyoshiro to Towa no Sora	Setsuna	
2007	Lovely Complex	Mayu Kanzaki	
2007	Nagasarete Airantō	Sakuya	
2008	Shigofumi	Kanaka	
2008	Amatsuki	Shinshu	
2009	Princess Lover!	Yuu Fujikura	
2009	The Melancholy of Haruhi Suzumiya	Tsuruya	TV 2009 renewal
2009	Ikkitousen: Great Guardians	Saji Genpou	
2009	Tegami Bachi	Nero	
2009	Detective Conan	Haruna Tabuse	Ep. 554–555
2010	Omamori Himari	Kuesu Jinguuji	
2010	Ikkitousen: Xtreme Xecutor	Saji Genpou	
2010	Amagami SS	Kanae Itō	
2011	Is This a Zombie?	Delusion Eucliwood #7	
2011	Mirai Nikki	Hinata Hino	
2012	Kuromajo-san ga Toru!!	Mai Ichiro	
2012	Tantei Opera Milky Holmes: Act 2	Coron	
2014	The World is Still Beautiful	Luna	
2015	The Disappearance of Nagato Yuki-chan	Tsuruya	
2017	UQ Holder!	Yukihime/Evangeline A.K. McDowell	
2022	Bleach: Thousand-Year Blood War	Orihime Inoue	

=== Original video animation ===
Year	Title	Roles	Note
2002	Love Hina Again	Kuro	
2002–2003	Jungle wa Itsumo Hare Nochi Guu Deluxe	Mary	
2003–2004	True Love Story	Kamiya Nayu	
2003–2004	Kingdom of Chaos - Born to Kill	Mara	
2004	Ojmajo Doremi Na-i-sho	Aiko Senoo	
2004	Bleach - Memories in the Rain	Orihime Inoue	
2004	Top wo Nerae 2!	Serpentine Twin	
2005	Elfen Lied	Nana	
2006	Mahou Sensei Negima! Haru	Evangeline A.K. McDowell	Spring
2006	Mahou Sensei Negima! Natsu	Evangeline A.K. McDowell	Summer
2008–2009	Mahou Sensei Negima! Ala Alba	Evangeline A.K. McDowell	The White Wing

=== Film ===
Year	Title	Roles	Note
2000	Ojamajo Doremi #: The Movie	Aiko Senoo	
2001	Motto! Ojamajo Doremi: Secret of the Frog Stone	Aiko Senoo	
2001	Azumanga Daioh: The Very Short Movie	Ayumu "Osaka" Kasuga	
2004	Appleseed	Hitomi	
2006	Bleach: Memories of Nobody	Orihime Inoue	
2007	Bleach: The Diamond Dust Rebellion	Orihime Inoue	
2010	The Disappearance of Haruhi Suzumiya	Tsuruya	
2010	Bleach: Hell Verse	Orihime Inoue	
2011	Tekken: Blood Vengeance	Alisa Bosconovitch	
2020	Looking for Magical Doremi	Aiko Senoo	

=== Video games ===
Year	Title	Roles	Consoles	Note
2000	Never 7: The End of Infinity	Kurumi Morino, Haruka Higuchi		
2002	Azumanga Donjara Daioh	Ayumu "Osaka" Kasuga		
2003	D.C.P.S. ～Da Capo Plus Situation～	Mako Mizukoshi		
2004	Ojamajo Adventure: Naisho no Mahou	Aiko Senoo		
2004	Stellvia of the Universe	Arisa Glennorth		
2005	Summon Night EX Thesis Yoake no Tsubasa	Piars		
2005	Musashi: Samurai Legend	Maki		
2005	D.C.F.S. ～Da Capo Four Seasons～	Mako Mizukoshi		
2005	Gokujō Seitokai	Rein Tsunomoto	PlayStation 2	
2006	Summon Night 4	Lisher		
2006	Bleach: Hanatareshi Yabou	Orihime Inoue		
2007	Tales of Innocence	Hermana Larmo	Nintendo DS (2007), PlayStation Vita (2012)	
2007	Princess Maker 5	Imagawa Emili		
2008	Ikkitousen: Eloquent Fist	Saji Genpou		
2008	Infinite Undiscovery	Komachi		
2008	Suikoden Tierkreis	Mona		
2009	Corpse Seed 2	Chika Kurosaki		
2009	Arcana Heart 3	Scharlachrot	Arcade (2009), PlayStation 3 (2011)	
2010	Corpse Seed 2: Burning Gluttony	Chika Kurosaki		
2010	Ikkitousen: Xross Impact	Saji Genpou		
2010	Dragon Ball Heroes	Avatar: Saiyan (female), Hero-type	Jp 2010, Update 2016	
2012	Corpse Seed 3	Chika Kurosaki		
2013	Puppeteer	Pikarina		
2014	Corpse Seed 3: Heartclub Extreme	Chika Kurosaki		
2014	Granblue Fantasy	Fenrir, Evangeline A.K. McDowell		
2014	Senran Kagura 2: Deep Crimson	Kagura		
2015	Senran Kagura: Estival Versus	Kagura		
2017	Corpse Seed 4			
2018	Corpse Seed 4: Endless Brawl	Chika Kurosaki		
2019	Pachi-Slot Tekken 4	Alisa Bosconovitch	Pachislot	
2019	Puyo Puyo Quest	Aiko Senoo	Voiced as part of an event celebrating the 20th anniversary of the Ojamajo Doremi anime	
2020	Kandagawa Jet Girls	Kamui Kurenai		
2020	Azur Lane	KMS Odin		
2020	World's End Club	Mowchan	Apple (2020), Switch (2021)	

=== Drama CDs ===
Year	Title	Roles	Note
2006	Hayate X Blade	Yuho Shizuma	
2009	Rakka Ryūsui	Haruka Kusaba	
	Danshi Meiro	Youko Oonuki	
	Dear	Chiruha	
	Te wo Nobaseba Haruka na Umi	Mayuuki Hayashida	
	Tsurezure	Kanoko Kurimoto	
	YuYu Hakusho Drama CD Two Shots	Maya Kitajima	
