= List of Haruhi Suzumiya light novels =

The cover of the first volume of the Haruhi Suzumiya light novel series released by Kadokawa Shoten

The Haruhi Suzumiya series of Japanese light novels is written by Nagaru Tanigawa with accompanying illustrations drawn by Noizi Ito. The series centers on the eponymous high school girl Haruhi Suzumiya, her strange antics, and her friends in a club she forms called the SOS Brigade.

The first novel volume was published on June 6, 2003, by Kadokawa Shoten, and as of November 2024, 13 volumes have been published. The first pressing of the tenth and eleventh volumes was a record-breaking 513,000 copies.

Little, Brown Books for Young Readers licensed the light novels for distribution in English, with the first novel being released in May 2009, along with excerpts from the manga adaptation. The novels in English are available in hardback and paperback editions, the hardback featuring the original manga-style Japanese cover art and the paperback featuring a different design.

The novels have also been licensed for release in Taiwan, Hong Kong and mainland China by Kadokawa Media, in South Korea by Daewon C.I., in Spain and Argentina by Editorial Ivrea, in Italy by Edizioni BD, in Thailand by Bongkoch Publishing, and in Vietnam by IPM. The tenth and the eleventh volumes were released consecutively in Japan, mainland China, Taiwan, Hong Kong, and South Korea in an "unprecedented worldwide release" with the other licensed countries releasing later.

== Volume list ==
No.	Title	Original release date	English release date
1	The Melancholy of Haruhi Suzumiya; Suzumiya Haruhi no Yūutsu (涼宮ハルヒの憂鬱)	June 6, 2003; 978-4-04-429201-0	May 7, 2009; 978-0-316-03901-7 (hardback), 978-0-316-03902-4 (paperback)
Prologue: 1. Chapter 1; 2. Chapter 2; 3. Chapter 3; 4. Chapter 4; 5. Chapter 5; 6. Chapter 6; 7. Chapter 7; Epilogue
Kyon is an ordinary first-year high school student who has given up his fantasies of espers, time travelers, and aliens as he left middle school. However, sitting behind him is the beautiful, intelligent, and eccentric girl Haruhi Suzumiya, who in her class introduction blatantly states her singular desire to meet aliens, time travelers, or espers. Interested, Kyon starts trying to make small talk with her before class, eventually leading to normal conversations with Haruhi. After making a comment about Haruhi's displeasure with the available school clubs, he finds himself dragged into membership of the newly formed Save the World by Overloading it with Fun Haruhi Suzumiya Brigade (Japanese: 世界を大いに盛り上げるための涼宮ハルヒの団 Sekai o Ōini Moriageru Tame no Suzumiya Haruhi no Dan), or SOS Brigade (Japanese: SOS団 Esu Ō Esu dan). Haruhi claims the Literature Club's room and its sole member, the silent bibliophile Yuki Nagato as property of the SOS Brigade and "voluntary arrests" the timid but cute Mikuru Asahina and the polite, smiling Itsuki Koizumi as club members. Kyon finds that each of these supposedly "helpless victims" are actually agents of fantastic organizations who have been sent to monitor Haruhi, who has superhuman abilities to manipulate the universe. Haruhi's unawareness of her powers means that she unconsciously creates a new universe—one more to her liking—and attempts to switch over whenever she becomes bored or otherwise dissatisfied with reality. To prevent this, the members of Haruhi's club spend their time trying to keep their god-like leader entertained, hold her powers in check, and maintain the illusion of a normal life.
2	The Sigh of Haruhi Suzumiya; Suzumiya Haruhi no Tameiki (涼宮ハルヒの溜息)	September 30, 2003; 978-4-04-429202-7	October 1, 2009; 978-0-316-03881-2 (hardback), 978-0-316-03879-9 (paperback)
Prologue: 1. Chapter 1; 2. Chapter 2; 3. Chapter 3; 4. Chapter 4; 5. Chapter 5; Epilogue
The story follows the SOS Brigade's first movie making project, starring Mikuru Asahina as a combat waitress from the future who has sworn to protect the esper Koizumi from the alien witch Nagato. In the movie, a love-triangle ensues with Asahina and Nagato striving for Koizumi's affections. The movie is Haruhi's idea for the upcoming cultural festival. However, she begins to confuse the movie with the real world, and the real world begins to become more like her movie. The pigeons in front of the shrine turn white, then into passenger pigeons, cherry trees blossom in autumn, Asahina begins to shoot lasers out of her eyes, and the cat Shamisen begins to talk. When Kyon makes up with Haruhi after a bitter argument over her mistreatment of Asahina, the resulting boost to her mood causes the alterations to reality to become more extreme. Kyon eventually convinces Haruhi to add a disclaimer at the end that the movie is a work of fiction. Overnight, the movie apparently edits itself, and is shown. With the disclaimer, the world reverts to normal.
3	The Boredom of Haruhi Suzumiya; Suzumiya Haruhi no Taikutsu (涼宮ハルヒの退屈)	December 27, 2003; 978-4-04-429203-4	July 1, 2010; 978-0-316-03886-7 (hardback), 978-0-316-03887-4 (paperback)
Prologue: 1. "The Boredom of Haruhi Suzumiya" (涼宮ハルヒの退屈, Suzumiya Haruhi no Taikutsu); 2. "Bamboo Leaf Rhapsody" (笹の葉ラプソディ, Sasa no Ha Rapusodi); 3. "Mysterique Sign" (ミステリックサイン, Misuterikku Sain); 4. "Remote Island Syndrome" (孤島症候群, Kotō Shōkōgun)
While published as the third volume in the series, this light novel collects short stories originally serialized in The Sneaker which chronologically take place between The Melancholy of Haruhi Suzumiya and The Sigh of Haruhi Suzumiya. In the first story, the SOS Brigade enters a baseball tournament. However, the team is hopelessly inept, and if they lose, Haruhi might destroy the world. To remedy the situation, Yuki uses her powers to alter the course of the game. In the second story, Haruhi, during the SOS Brigade meeting on July 7, tells everyone to write down wishes for the Tanabata festival. After the meeting concludes, Mikuru takes Kyon back in time, to the same day three years ago. He finds a young Haruhi sneaking into her junior high school, and is forced to assist her, though he conceals his identity by using the pseudonym "John Smith". After helping her draw strange symbols on the school athletics grounds, Haruhi questions him on the existence of strange beings, and Kyon suggests that they might exist because he knows someone like her at his school. After Haruhi leaves, Kyon wakes up Mikuru, only to find that her time traveling device has been taken. They go to see Yuki, who helps them return to their proper time. Kyon wonders if he was the one who inspired Haruhi to attend his high school and start searching for strange beings. In the third story, the SOS Brigade are hired by Emiri Kimidori to investigate the disappearance of the Computer Research Society president. In the absence of Haruhi, the members of the Brigade enter a sealed reality in his apartment. Therein lives a data entity, whose appearance is of a giant cave cricket – somehow created by the president once he looked at the logo drawn by Haruhi for the SOS Brigade website. Nagato and Koizumi defeat the monster, thereby recovering the president. In the fourth story, Keiichi Tamaru, said to be a rich relative of Koizumi's, invites the SOS Brigade to stay at his island villa. Haruhi keeps talking about how the island, as an isolated location, is the perfect spot for a murder mystery, raising concerns that her powers will cause a murder to occur. They enjoy the facilities and play outside on the beach. On the second morning there Keiichi is found dead with a knife in his chest, and Haruhi attempts to solve the mystery. The clues point to Kyon and Koizumi having accidentally caused Keiichi's death, but Kyon figures out that Koizumi and Keiichi faked the murder to keep Haruhi too busy with a fake mystery to create a real one.
4	The Disappearance of Haruhi Suzumiya; Suzumiya Haruhi no Shōshitsu (涼宮ハルヒの消失)	July 31, 2004; 978-4-04-429204-1	November 2, 2010; 978-0-316-03890-4 (hardback), 978-0-316-03889-8 (paperback)
Prologue: 1. Chapter 1; 2. Chapter 2; 3. Chapter 3; 4. Chapter 4; 5. Chapter 5; 6. Chapter 6; Epilogue
On December 17, everything is normal—the SOS Brigade plans to have a nabe party for Christmas. On December 18, Kyon arrives at school to find Haruhi Suzumiya is missing, and Ryoko Asakura occupies her desk. Kyon is the only one who notices anything different. Nagato is an ordinary human, Mikuru does not recognize him, and Koizumi's entire class no longer exists. The only clues are a bookmark left by the alien version of Nagato, and Taniguchi, who alone among Kyon's classmates still knows who Haruhi Suzumiya is. Haruhi re-assembles the SOS Brigade, which sends Kyon on a quest back in time.
5	The Rampage of Haruhi Suzumiya; Suzumiya Haruhi no Bōsō (涼宮ハルヒの暴走)	September 30, 2004; 978-4-04-429205-8	June 7, 2011; 978-0-316-03882-9 (hardback), 978-0-316-03884-3 (paperback)
1. "Endless Eight" (エンドレスエイト, Endoresu Eito); 2. "The Day of Sagittarius" (射手座の日, Iteza no Hi); 3. "Snowy Mountain Syndrome" (雪山症候群, Yukiyama Shōkōgun)
In the first story, set between The Boredom of Haruhi Suzumiya and The Sigh of Haruhi Suzumiya, the SOS Brigade are enjoying the last two weeks of summer vacation. Asahina's inability to return to the future leads them to the discovery that this time period has been repeated 15,498 times in an infinite time loop; once the vacation ends, Haruhi invariably feels there is something more she wants to do, and the two weeks restart. Kyon struggles to come up with an activity to satisfy Haruhi before the loop can repeat yet again. In the second story, set between The Sigh of Haruhi Suzumiya and The Disappearance of Haruhi Suzumiya, the Computer Research Society challenges the SOS Brigade to a computer game tournament, hoping to reclaim the computer Haruhi extorted from the Computer Research Society earlier in the year. The game, entitled The Day of Sagittarius III, is a real-time strategy game involving spaceship fleets. Nagato finds out that the Computer Research Society is cheating and reprograms the game in the middle of the match, thus winning the tournament, the admiration of the Computer Research Society, and Kyon's realization that she enjoys working with computers. In the third story, set after The Disappearance of Haruhi Suzumiya, while skiing during winter vacation, the SOS Brigade are trapped by a mysterious blizzard, and take refuge in a deserted mansion. Nagato is cut off from the Integrated Data Entity and becomes ill, and Koizumi says an enemy of the SOS Brigade is behind this. They have hallucinations and use them as clues to solve a math problem carved on the door, which Koizumi believes is the only way to get out. Once they emerge, Koizumi tells Haruhi that the whole experience was a mirage; she accepts this far-fetched explanation rather than face the reality of their having gone through a paranormal adventure.
6	The Wavering of Haruhi Suzumiya; Suzumiya Haruhi no Dōyō (涼宮ハルヒの動揺)	March 31, 2005; 978-4-04-429206-5	November 7, 2011; 978-0-316-03891-1 (hardback), 978-0-316-03892-8 (paperback)
1. "Live Alive" (ライブアライブ, Raibu Araibu); 2. "The Adventures of Mikuru Asahina Episode 00" (朝比奈ミクルの冒険 Episode 00, Asahina Mikuru no Bōken Episode 00); 3. "Love at First Sight" (ヒトメボレLOVER, Hitomebore LOVER); 4. "Where Did the Cat Go?" (猫はどこに行った？, Neko wa Doko ni Itta?); 5. "The Melancholy of Mikuru Asahina" (朝比奈みくるの憂鬱, Asahina Mikuru no Yūutsu)
In the first story, Kyon visits the cultural festival's events. These include a fried noodle stall run by Mikuru and Tsuruya and a live performance by Haruhi and Nagato, who are standing in for the ailing vocalist/guitarist of a rock band so that the other members can have a chance to perform their music before they graduate. The discovery that Haruhi is capable of selflessly helping others, and even enjoys it, makes Kyon see Haruhi in a new light. The second story tells the story within a story of the movie created in The Sigh of Haruhi Suzumiya. In the third story, set between The Disppearance of Haruhi Suzumiya and "Snowy Mountain Syndrome", an old friend of Kyon's has fallen in love with Nagato, and asks for Kyon's help in pursuing a relationship with her. Nagato realizes that Kyon's friend has a rare ability which allows him to perceive the manifestation of the Data Overmind within her, and that he mistook this transcendental experience for love. She removes his ability to interact with the Data Overmind, leading him to retract his offer of love. In the fourth story, during their winter vacation, Koizumi keeps his promise to give the SOS Brigade a murder mystery scenario. This time everyone knows the event is staged, to avoid upsetting Haruhi as he did in "Remote Island Syndrome". In the fifth story, Mikuru asks Kyon to accompany her to buy tea leaves. He assumes the outing is a date, but it turns out to be a mission from the future to save the life of a boy who is crucial to the development of time travel.
7	The Intrigues of Haruhi Suzumiya; Suzumiya Haruhi no Inbō (涼宮ハルヒの陰謀)	August 31, 2005; 978-4-04-429207-2	June 19, 2012; 978-0-316-03895-9 (hardback), 978-0-316-03896-6 (paperback)
Prologue: 1. Chapter 1; 2. Chapter 2; 3. Chapter 3; 4. Chapter 4; 5. Chapter 5; 6. Chapter 6; 7. Chapter 7; Epilogue
After closing the time loop from The Disappearance of Haruhi Suzumiya, Kyon believes he is starting the new year with a blank slate and perhaps free of the confusions of time travel. However, Mikuru appears in the SOS Brigade's broom closet, saying she was sent back in time from eight days in the future by Kyon himself. This is further complicated by messages with obscure instructions from the Adult Mikuru, as well as the appearances of a rival time traveller and a rival esper. Meanwhile, Haruhi is strangely perturbed, giving Kyon an unexpectedly easy time when he excuses himself from SOS Brigade meetings to help Mikuru with her missions.
8	The Indignation of Haruhi Suzumiya; Suzumiya Haruhi no Fungai (涼宮ハルヒの憤慨)	May 1, 2006; 978-4-04-429208-9	November 20, 2012; 978-0-316-03900-0 (hardback), 978-0-316-03899-7 (paperback)
1. "Editor in Chief, Full Speed Ahead!" (編集長★一直線！, Henshūchō ★ Itchokusen!); 2. "Wandering Shadow" (ワンダリング・シャドウ, Wandaringu Shadō)
In the first story, the newly elected student council president points out that the SOS Brigade has no official existence, and threatens to terminate the club unless they demonstrate some legitimate activity as the Literature Club. The president is secretly employed by Koizumi's agency to give Haruhi a rival to occupy her. To end the threat, the SOS Brigade must publish a collection of literature, with Haruhi as editor-in-chief. Haruhi assigns Kyon to write a romance story, anticipating that his lack of imagination will force him to draw on his own experiences for the story and thus tell her about his romantic history. In the second story, a classmate, Sakanaka, employs the SOS Brigade to find out why a stretch of park pathway is having a strange effect on the neighborhood dogs.
9	The Dissociation of Haruhi Suzumiya; Suzumiya Haruhi no Bunretsu (涼宮ハルヒの分裂)	April 1, 2007; 978-4-04-429209-6	June 18, 2013; 978-0-316-03893-5 (hardback), 978-0-316-03894-2 (paperback)
Prologue: 1. Chapter 1; 2. Chapter 2; 3. Chapter 3
On the last day of vacation, Kyon meets an old friend from his days in cram school, Sasaki. Haruhi is confused by the arrival of this previously unmentioned figure from Kyon's past, and Kyon is alarmed when he finds out Sasaki is now associating with the time traveller and esper who kidnapped Asahina in The Intrigues of Haruhi Suzumiya, as well as an inscrutable alien not associated with the Data Overmind. As the second year of high school begins, the SOS Brigade attempts to recruit new members and gets an unexpected mass of applicants. When Kyon receives a call in the bath, the story is split into two parallel timelines referred to as α and β, with subtle changes that snowball into wildly deviant plots.
10	The Surprise of Haruhi Suzumiya (First Half); Suzumiya Haruhi no Kyōgaku (Zen) (涼宮ハルヒの驚愕 (前))	May 25, 2011 (limited ed.); June 15, 2011 (regular ed.); 978-4-04-429210-2 (limited ed.); 978-4-04-429211-9 (regular ed.)	November 19, 2013; 978-0-316-03898-0 (hardback), 978-0-316-03897-3 (paperback)
4. Chapter 4; 5. Chapter 5; 6. Chapter 6
This is a continuation of the previous novel The Dissociation of Haruhi Suzumiya. The first chapter ("Chapter 4") was originally published in the June 2010 issue of The Sneaker. The story depicts the events that occur in the separate timelines. In timeline α, Kyon goes through dealing with the SOS Brigade Entrance Trials and a suspicious first-year student, who passes all the trials to become the newest member of the SOS Brigade. In the β timeline, Yuki Nagato falls ill and the SOS Brigade take care of her while Kyon has several meetings with Sasaki and her group, who are behind Nagato's illness.
11	The Surprise of Haruhi Suzumiya (Second Half); Suzumiya Haruhi no Kyōgaku (Go) (涼宮ハルヒの驚愕 (後))	May 25, 2011 (limited ed.); June 15, 2011 (regular ed.); 978-4-04-429210-2 (limited ed.); 978-4-04-429212-6 (regular ed.)	November 19, 2013; 978-0-316-03898-0 (hardback), 978-0-316-03897-3 (paperback)
7. Chapter 7; 8. Chapter 8; 9. Chapter 9; 10. Final Chapter; Epilogue
This is a continuation of the previous novel The Surprise of Haruhi Suzumiya (First Half). In timeline β, Kyon, Sasaki, and her group head to North High as it was said to be a predetermined event by the time-traveller Fujiwara. Kyon walks into the gate only to notice that he is trapped in Sasaki's closed space. They arrive at the Literature Club room where in timeline α, another Kyon is meeting Yasumi. Kyon fuses into a single being and goes through all his memories from the different timelines. Fujiwara orders the mysterious alien Kōyou to kill Haruhi so that her power can be transferred to Sasaki, allowing him to recover his lost sister. Haruhi's closed space comes into conflict with Sasaki's, allowing Koizumi to enter the space, bringing Adult Asahina with him. They battle Sasaki's group while Kyon attempts to save Haruhi. The English release combines both into a single volume.
12	The Intuition of Haruhi Suzumiya; Suzumiya Haruhi no Chokkan (涼宮ハルヒの直観)	November 25, 2020; 978-4-04-110792-8	November 25, 2020 (ebook); June 22, 2021 (physical); 978-1-9753-2255-7 (hardback), 978-1-9753-2256-4 (paperback)
1. "Random Numbers" (あてずっぽナンバーズ, Atezu ppo nanbāzu); 2. "Seven Wonders Overtime" (七不思議オーバータイム, Nanafushigi ōbātaimu); 3. "Tsuruya's Challenge" (鶴屋さんの挑戦, Tsuruya san no chōsen)
The first story, a follow-up to "Where Did the Cat Go?", recounts the SOS Brigade's first shrine visit of the year. During the trip Haruhi's sandal strap breaks, and Kyon carries her out of the crowded shrine on his back. At Haruhi's proposal, they rent hakama for the two boys to go with the girls' kimono. In the second story, Haruhi becomes interested in a "seven wonders of North High", so the rest of the SOS Brigade brainstorm seven relatively innocuous "wonders" to avert Haruhi's coming up with her own seven wonders – and, using her powers, manifesting them. In the third story, Tsuruya, after going away on a family vacation, sends the SOS Brigade a series of three mystery challenges, each of them involving some form of narrative trick which they must unravel. The challenges also tell them more about Tsuruya and her friendship with T, a member of the mystery club.
13	The Theater of Haruhi Suzumiya; Suzumiya Haruhi no Gekijō (涼宮ハルヒの劇場)	November 29, 2024; 978-4-04-115439-7	November 29, 2024 (ebook); July 8, 2025 (physical); 979-8-8554-1690-9 (hardback), 979-8-8554-1689-3 (paperback)
1. ACT 1 – Fantasy; 2. ACT 2 – Galaxy; 3. ACT 3 – World Tour; 4. FINAL ACT – Escape
