= Haruhi Suzumiya (character) =

Fictional character from The Melancholy of Haruhi Suzumiya

- Haruhi Suzumiya character
- Haruhi Suzumiya as she appears in The Disappearance of Haruhi Suzumiya
- First appearance: The Melancholy of Haruhi Suzumiya (2003)
- Created by: Nagaru Tanigawa
- Portrayed by: Patricia Ja Lee, Cristina Vee (ASOS Brigade)
- Voiced by: Aya Hirano (Japanese); Wendee Lee (English)

In-universe information
- Title: Brigade Leader (SOS Brigade Rank)
- Nationality: Japanese

Haruhi Suzumiya (Japanese: 涼宮 ハルヒ, Hepburn: Suzumiya Haruhi) is a fictional character introduced as the title character and heroine of the Japanese media franchise Haruhi Suzumiya, created by Nagaru Tanigawa. Haruhi first appears in the novel volumes which began in 2003, and later appears in the anime television series adaptation by Kyoto Animation, and the animated film The Disappearance of Haruhi Suzumiya. She also appears in related media in the franchise including the manga adaptation, two original net animation series, and video games. Aya Hirano voices Haruhi in Japanese in all her animated appearances and Wendee Lee voices her in the English dub. She is also portrayed by Patricia Ja Lee and Cristina Vee in the live action series ASOS Brigade.

Haruhi is depicted as an eccentric and headstrong schoolgirl, who has a great disdain for anything that she views as normal or mundane, and is only interested in supernatural beings or mysterious occurrences. Her displeasure with the school's "normal" after-school clubs leads Haruhi to gather up several students (Kyon, Yuki Nagato, Mikuru Asahina, and Itsuki Koizumi) and found her own: the SOS Brigade, making them participate in activities whether they like it or not. Haruhi also, unknown to her, possesses unconscious god-like abilities to change, destroy, and reshape reality to her desires. The activities of the club and its members become increasingly involved with incidents caused by her abilities.

In an interview, series creator Tanigawa stated that the idea for the character came during a sleepless night at the beginning of the 21st century. Despite the franchise being named after her, it is told from the perspective of Kyon. Haruhi is considered by some to have tsundere character traits in her treatment of Kyon, but is perceived by others as too energetic to be a true tsundere. She has appeared in surveys to decide the most popular anime characters in Japan, and in 2009 was included in IGN's ranking of the greatest anime characters of all time.

== Characterization ==
=== Appearance ===
Haruhi has a pale skin tone, big brown eyes, and brown hair. In the beginning of the series she had long hair reaching to her waist and would change her hairstyle every day. After having a conversation with Kyon concerning her hair she decided to cut it just above her shoulders. Haruhi is always seen wearing an orange-yellow ribbon in her hair. In The Disappearance of Haruhi Suzumiya she is seen with longer, uncut hair. She usually appears in her school uniform along with an arm band that reads "brigade leader", although she is occasionally seen in more casual clothes. She sometimes swaps out the arm band for one proclaiming short-term but similarly elevated titles, like "Ultra Director" while she was making a movie with the SOS Brigade.

=== Personality ===
Haruhi is a very intelligent, athletic, and competitive person who enjoys being the center of attention. She is naturally talented at nearly everything that she sets out to do, and accepts any challenge that catches her interest without hesitation, regardless of difficulty or time constraint. She gets bored easily and has a limited attention span, often changing her plans radically and without prior notice to any others involved. Despite her intelligence, her brashness leads to her making impulsive decisions, which contributes to much of the conflict in the series. She repeatedly demonstrates a lack of awareness or consideration for others, often blatantly violating social norms in service of her desires, or sometimes simply for lack of care. She puts up a front of coldness and indifference to anything that she considers normal and uninteresting, though this mask slips occasionally when she is around Kyon.

Haruhi is a blunt and bossy person, consistently expecting others to either obey or submit to her, setting absurd, highly specific, and often unreasonable standards for the completion of any task she sets them to. Though rude and disdainful towards Kyon, she often accepts and follows his reasoning even when it conflicts with her desires, such as forfeiting the baseball tournament in "The Boredom of Haruhi Suzumiya" and refraining from using embarrassing photos of Mikuru to promote the SOS Brigade in "The Melancholy of Haruhi Suzumiya".

Although Haruhi would like supernatural phenomena to exist and many of her conscious efforts are devoted to discovering them, she maintains a normal skepticism in the supernatural. For example, although Haruhi attempts to contact aliens during the Tanabata holiday three years before the events of the series, she dismisses Kyon when he posits that the other members of the SOS Brigade (Yuki, Mikuru, and Itsuki) are supernatural creatures, stating that it is "too convenient" to be true.

Despite her selfish and callous attitude at the start of the series, she later becomes more sympathetic to others and displays a strong sense of responsibility towards the SOS Brigade members, such as when she gets up early on school days to care for Yuki when she is sick in The Surprise of Haruhi Suzumiya. Kyon increasingly turns to her as a confidant, even discussing the supernatural problems faced by the SOS Brigade in "Snowy Mountain Syndrome" and The Surprise under the veil of "family problems" and "study problems" respectively.

Though Haruhi shows little interest in romance throughout the series, she has prior to the story's events been in short relationships with multiple boys, all of whom she dumped as uninteresting. She is implied to be in love with Kyon, but is resistant to her feelings for him becoming known. When he catches her putting her cardigan on him to keep him warm in "Someday in the Rain", she is mortified, and in The Intrigues of Haruhi Suzumiya, after preparing for him an elaborate treasure hunt with Valentine's chocolates made by the three SOS Brigade girls, she warns him not to tell anyone about it since it would "start rumors".

=== Voice actors ===
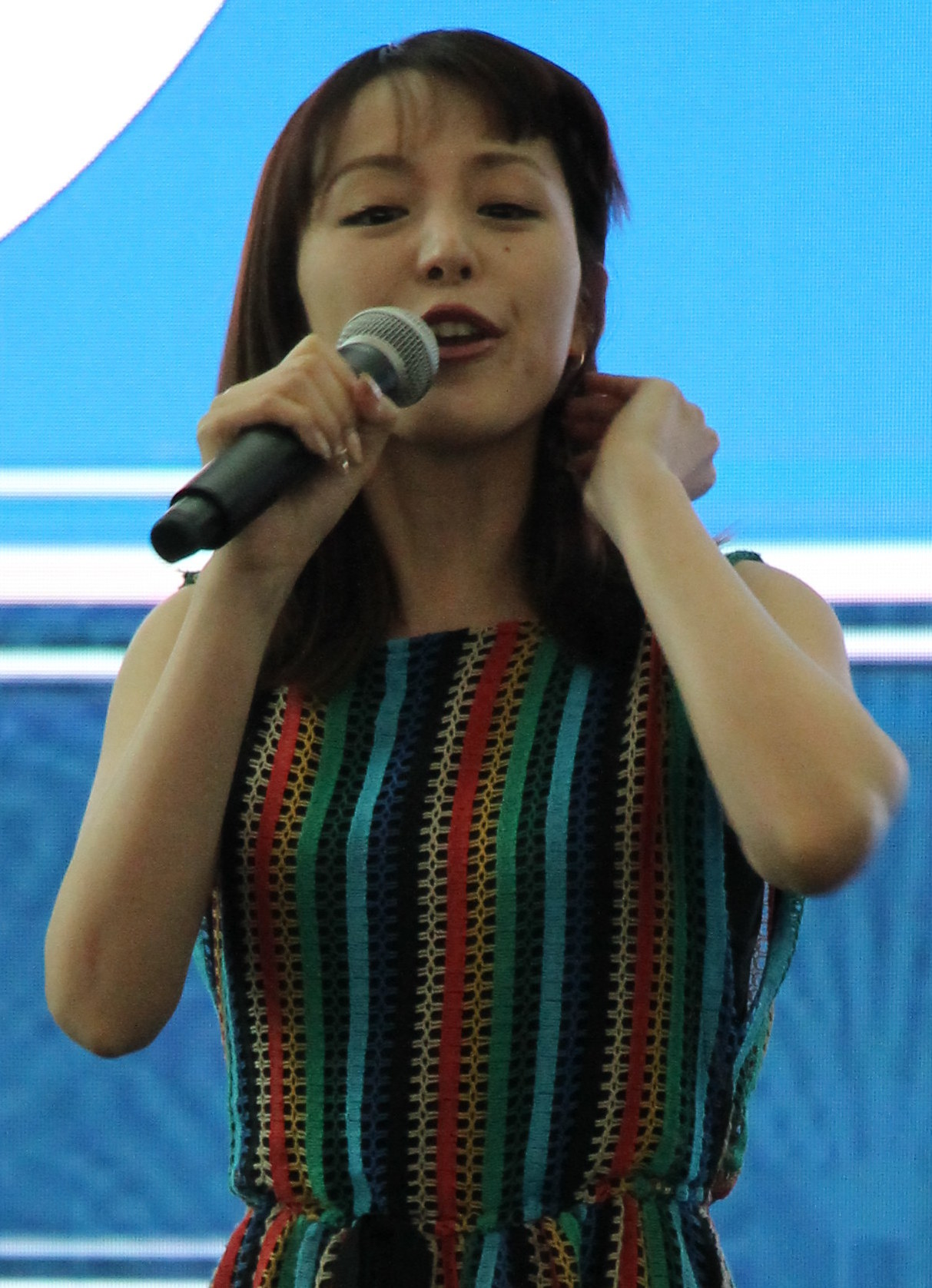
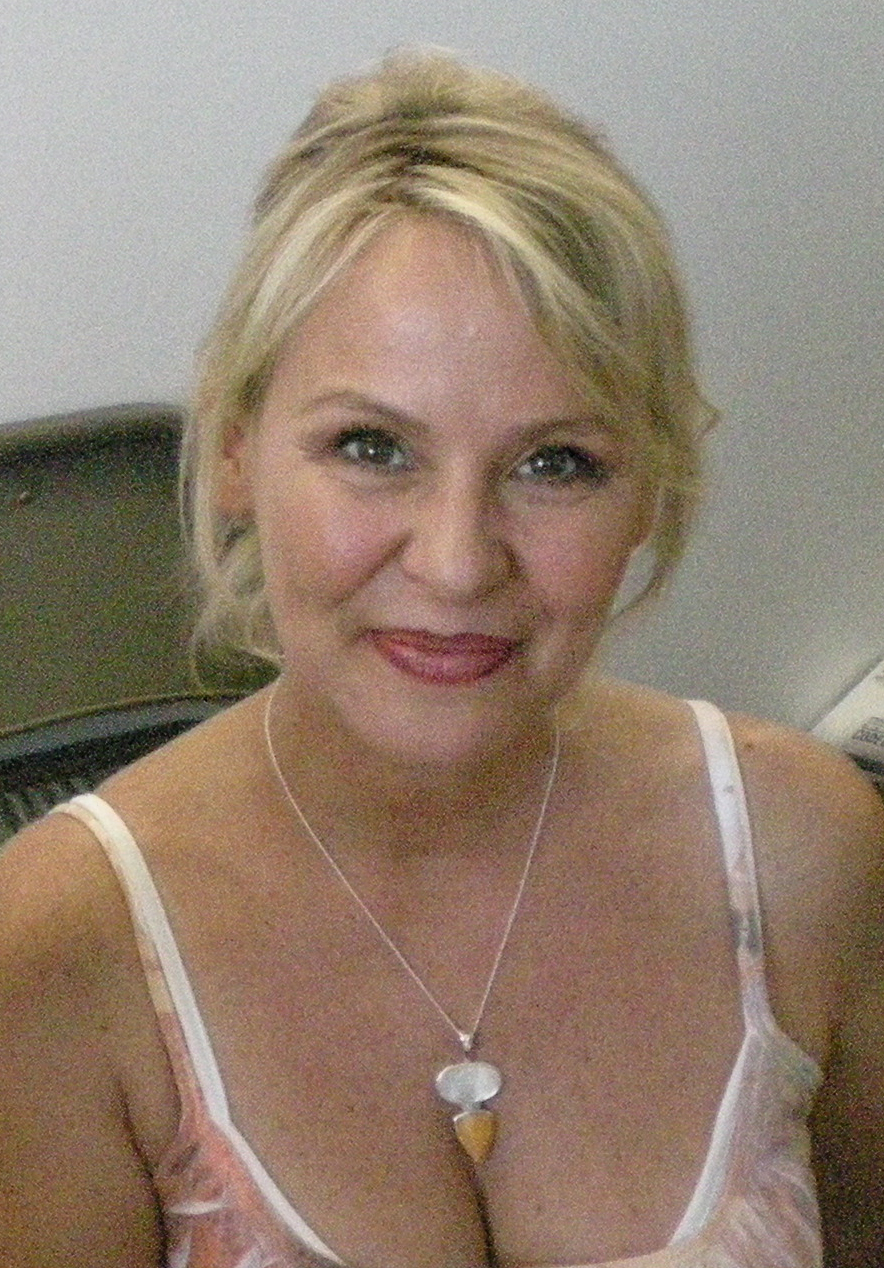
Aya Hirano (left) provided the voice for Haruhi in the sub, while Wendee Lee (right) provided the voice for the character in the English dub.

Aya Hirano voices Haruhi's character in all her appearances in the anime series, the 2010 film The Disappearance of Haruhi Suzumiya, and the later spin-off series and video games. Haruhi is voiced by Wendee Lee in the English dubs of the aforementioned media within the franchise.

American actress Patricia Ja Lee portrayed Haruhi in the first series of ASOS Brigade, a series of live-action promotional videos launched by Bandai Entertainment on December 22, 2006, to announce the R1 license of The Melancholy of Haruhi Suzumiya. She was replaced for the second series of promotional videos by Cristina Vee.

== Appearances ==
=== The Melancholy of Haruhi Suzumiya ===
While little is revealed about Haruhi's origins or her family, she cites a revelatory incident in her childhood when she attended a baseball game with her family. Before the event, Haruhi tended to think of herself and her life as being special and interesting, but the sheer number of people packed into the stadium (and her later calculations that this only represented a small fraction of the population of Japan) caused her to come to the conclusion that the events of her life likely fit into the normal, everyday occurrences and habits of Japanese citizens and humans in general.

Her belief that there had to be at least one person in the world who lived a truly interesting and unique life, and her desire to be that person, led her to begin a search for the extraordinary. Throughout middle school she gained a reputation as an eccentric, for incidents including painting hieroglyphs on the school grounds, moving all of the school's desks out into the hallways, and going out with and then dumping every boy who asked her out. Haruhi attracted the most attention by drawing a huge graffiti mural on the field at school of the night of Tanabata, which was reported in the newspaper. It is later revealed that Kyon was the one who drew the mural under Haruhi's orders after he and Mikuru traveled back in time. Using the alias "John Smith", Kyon implied that there were strange things out there and that there might be interesting people at North High, which inspired Haruhi to attend the school.

Haruhi's entrance into high school is marked by her meeting her fellow student and series protagonist, Kyon, the first person to seriously engage her in conversation related to her interests. He inspires Haruhi to, in despair over the lack of interesting school clubs, create her own: the Save the World by Overloading It with Fun Haruhi Suzumiya Brigade (in the English translation of the anime, "Spreading Excitement All Over the World with Haruhi Suzumiya Brigade") (世界を大いに盛り上げるための涼宮ハルヒの団, Sekai o Ōi ni Moriageru Tame no Suzumiya Haruhi no Dan) or the SOS Brigade.

=== The Disappearance of Haruhi Suzumiya ===
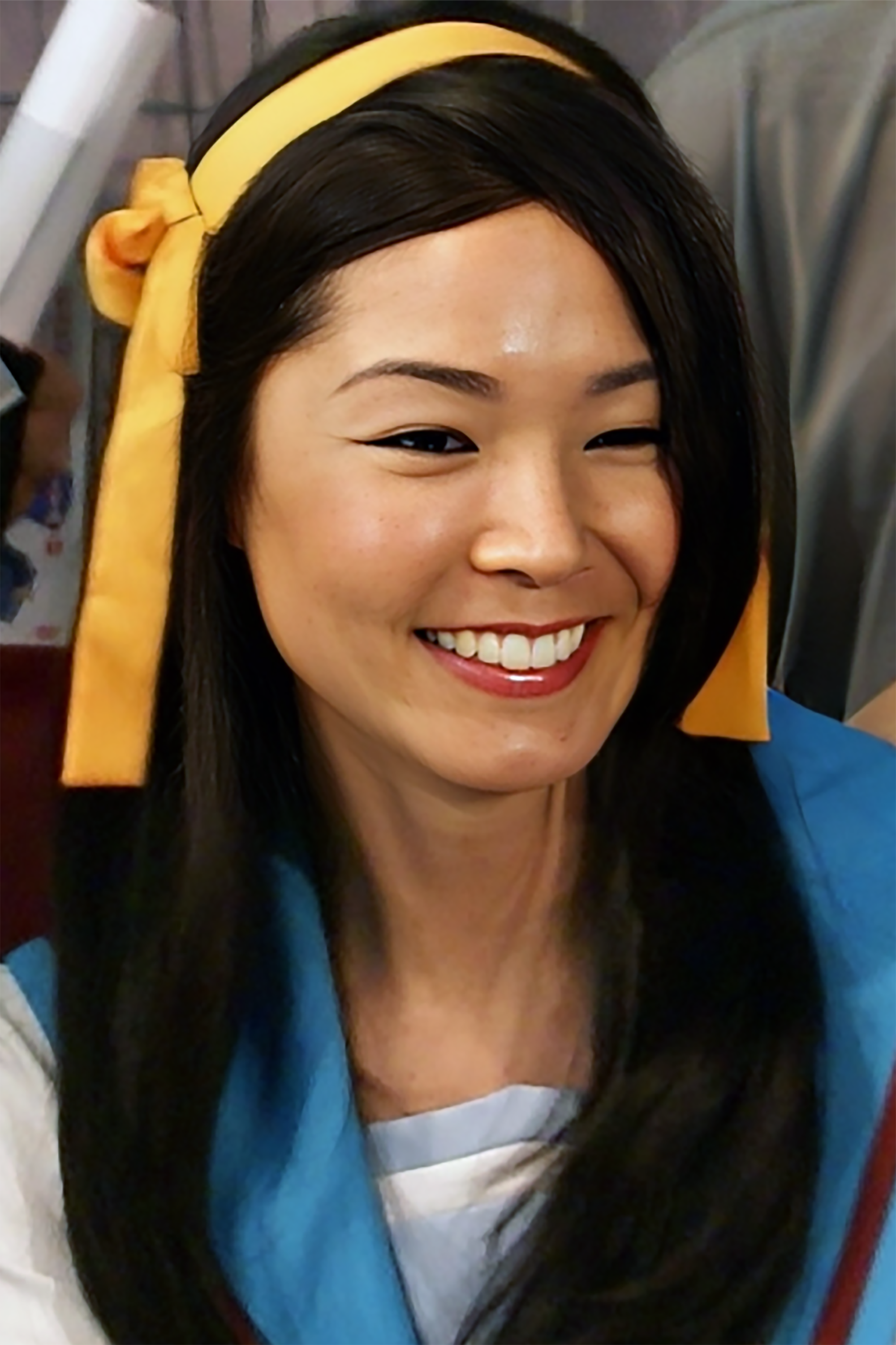
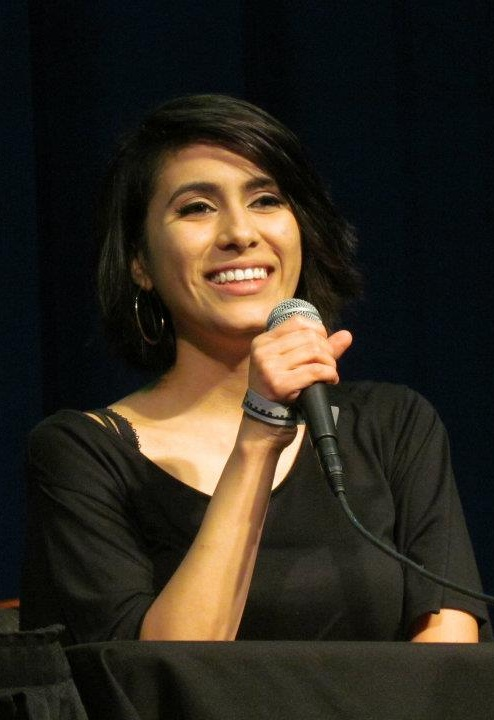
Patricia Ja Lee (left) and Cristina Vee (right) portrayed Haruhi in the live action series ASOS Brigade.

Haruhi appears prominently in the film alongside her alternate reality counterpart, who has no powers to alter reality and is a normal high school girl who attends Kouyouen Academy with Itsuki Koizumi. However, after Kyon informed her about an incident involving painting hieroglyphs on the school grounds and revealed himself to be "John Smith", the alternate reality version of Haruhi helped him restore the former world. When the former world is restored, the main reality Haruhi does Christmas-themed activities in the SOS Brigade.

=== The Disappearance of Nagato Yuki-chan ===
Haruhi is an important character in the spin-off series. She retains her goal of finding aliens, time travelers and espers, as well as her energetic and eccentric character. However, she is much more open about her feelings for Kyon; she takes him out on a date in "Be My Valentine", and in "Her Melancholy", when asked if she is in love with Kyon, she gives a neutral answer.

=== In other media ===
Haruhi makes a brief cameo in the 20th episode of the anime Lucky Star. During the episode, she appears in a soda brand commercial. Both Hirano and Lee reprise their roles.

== Cultural impact ==
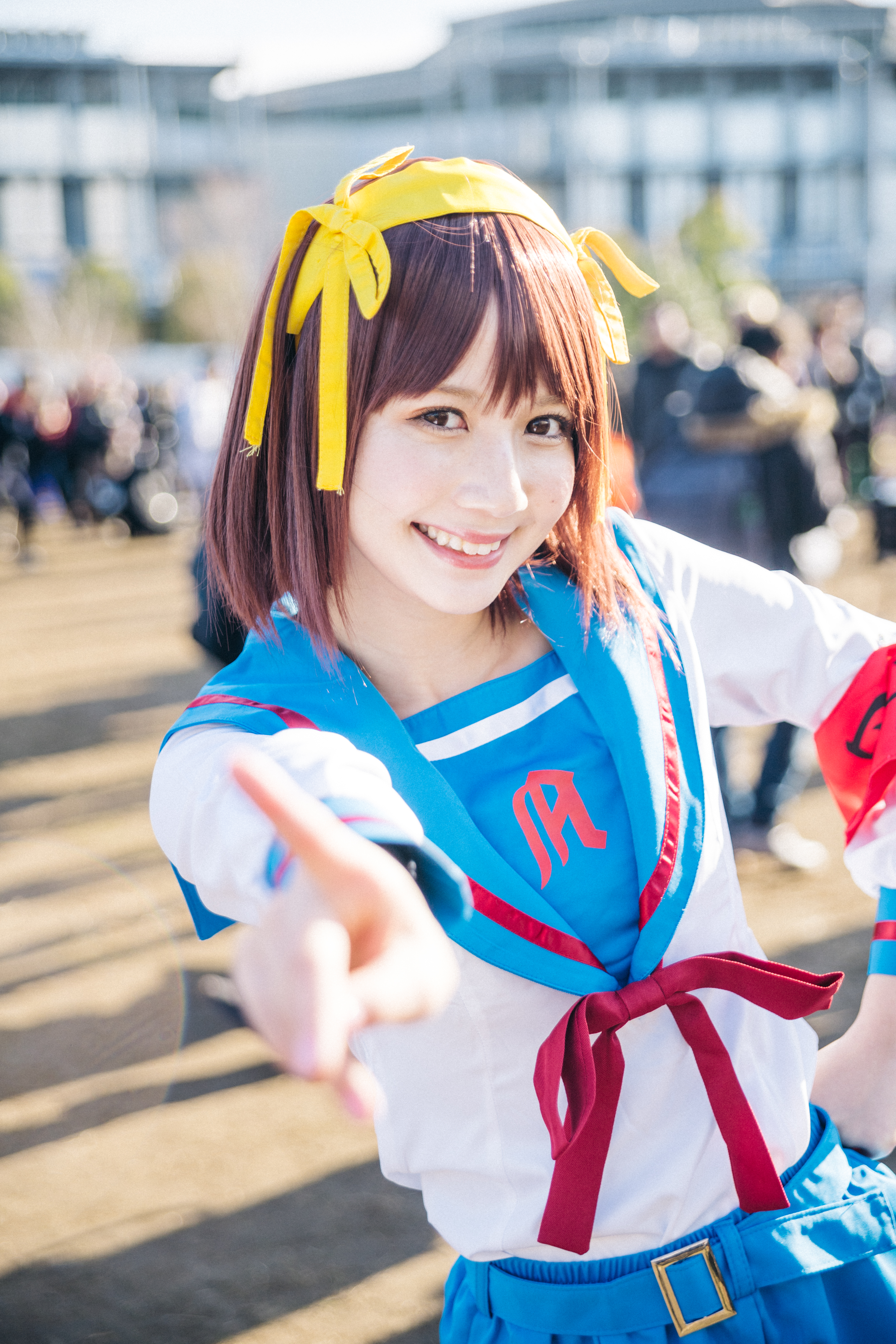
A cosplayer of Haruhi in 2019

=== Popularity ===
Haruhi is often ranked as one of the most popular female anime characters. She is frequently cosplayed at anime conventions. At Anime Expo 2008, Haruhi was awarded the Society for the Promotion of Japanese Animation (SPJA) award for Best Female Character. In 2009, IGN ranked her as the nineteenth greatest anime character of all time.

Haruhi fans have light-heartedly referred to themselves as followers of "Haruhiism" (also spelled "Haruhi-ism"), referencing the God-like status of Haruhi that Koizumi mentions in the original The Melancholy of Haruhi Suzumiya light novel. Haruhiism is a mock religion, based on Koizumi's suggestion that an undefined phenomenon which happened three years prior to the start of the series was Haruhi destroying the universe and then creating the current universe according to her own design. Haruhi fans have jokingly claimed that Haruhi is the creator and destroyer of everything. The term is also used in the title of the 2009 art book Haruhi-ism: Noizi Ito Artworks.

=== Critical reception ===
Although Felicity Hughes of The Japan Times describes Haruhi as having tsundere character traits in her treatment of Kyon, she notes that the opinion is controversial as fans consider her "too energetic to be truly tsundere". Her outlook has been compared to Fox Mulder's from the X-Files, as both characters "want to believe." Unlike Mulder, Finnegan describes Haruhi as an "immature, self-centered tsundere with violent mood swings."

In a 2020 ranking on Crunchyroll of the most popular characters from the Haruhi franchise, Haruhi herself was ranked second behind Yuki Nagato, and received 114,690 points.

== See also ==
- List of Haruhi Suzumiya characters
