= List of Haruhi Suzumiya characters =

The major characters of the series (from left to right): Back row: Kimidori, Ryoko, Tsuruya, Kyon, and Itsuki. Front row: Mikuru, Haruhi, Kyon's sister, and Yuki.

This is a list of the characters featured in the Haruhi Suzumiya franchise, written by Nagaru Tanigawa and illustrated by Noizi Ito, which contains a multitude of other secondary, and minor characters who are introduced throughout the course of the series. The main characters in the series are the five members of the SOS Brigade, including the titular Haruhi Suzumiya.

== SOS Brigade members ==
The SOS Brigade is an unofficial club at North High School, founded by Haruhi Suzumiya to investigate mysterious events.

=== Kyon ===
Kyon
- Haruhi Suzumiya character
- First appearance: The Melancholy of Haruhi Suzumiya (2003)
- Voiced by: Tomokazu Sugita (Japanese); Crispin Freeman (English)

In-universe information
- Alias: John Smith
- Nationality: Japanese

Kyon (キョン) is the protagonist of the series. Kyon's real name is never given, and everyone calls him by his nickname, given to him by his aunt.
Kyon is a student at North High with a laid-back and sarcastic attitude. He's drawn to Haruhi's unusual approach to life and begins talking to her daily before class. Kyon is often annoyed by Haruhi's demands, but in The Sigh of Haruhi Suzumiya, he comes to the realization that he always goes along with them without hesitation, meaning that he enjoys the activities Haruhi orchestrates more than the dullness of ordinary life; he likens himself to a boy who complains about the lunches his mother prepares for him even though he won't make his own.
Yuki, Mikuru, and Itsuki reveal what they are to Kyon, saying they believe him to be a key figure because he is the only normal human Haruhi chose to interact with and because he has led to her behavior becoming more unsettled than in recent years. Kyon meets a middle-school-age Haruhi while time-traveling, introducing himself to her as "John Smith", and was the one who painted the hieroglyph in the field. Later in the series he more openly expresses his fondness for Haruhi in his narrative (though not in conversation), expressing a profound enthusiasm for seeing her happy. He becomes uncomfortable when he meets with other girls on a one-on-one basis and goes to great lengths to prevent Haruhi from finding out about these encounters.
In an interview, Nagaru Tanigawa admitted that Kyon was to be an esper in his original conception, but while writing The Melancholy of Haruhi Suzumiya, Kyon was instead changed into an ordinary student. He is the main character of the spin-off series The Disappearance of Nagato Yuki-chan. In The Surprise of Haruhi Suzumiya, Kyon time leaps and briefly meets a college-age Haruhi with another version of himself on campus, where the two appear to be close.

=== Haruhi Suzumiya ===
Haruhi Suzumiya
- Haruhi Suzumiya character
- First appearance: The Melancholy of Haruhi Suzumiya (2003)
- Portrayed by: Patricia Ja Lee, Cristina Vee (ASOS Brigade)
- Voiced by: Aya Hirano (Japanese); Wendee Lee (English)

In-universe information
- Nationality: Japanese

Haruhi Suzumiya (涼宮 ハルヒ, Suzumiya Haruhi) is the title character, the heroine, and leader of the SOS Brigade, whose energetic and eccentric character proves to be the driving force for the series. She has a mind for adventure which often leads her subordinates to be swept into her plans. Haruhi's goal is to find aliens, time travelers and espers. While smart, beautiful, and energetic, Haruhi was eyed as an oddball ever since middle school: She set all the desks from her classroom out into the hallway, painted stars on the roofs, and even drew a huge hieroglyph on the school field (though this was later shown to be Kyon). Haruhi cannot stand boredom so she comes up with activities for the SOS Brigade, making them participate whether they like it or not. In the sixth grade, Haruhi felt she was no longer special after going to a baseball game and realizing she was one in a sea of people. After that she set out to make her life interesting and unique. What Haruhi does not know is that she has the power to change the world as she pleases. By subconsciously using it, she gathers Mikuru Asahina, Itsuki Koizumi, and Yuki Nagato into one place: the SOS Brigade. The story is indirect in saying how much Yuki, Mikuru and Itsuki know about each other.
She is an important character in the spin-off series The Disappearance of Nagato Yuki-chan. She retains her character from The Disappearance of Haruhi Suzumiya, in which she has no powers to alter reality and is a normal high school girl who attends Kouyouen Academy with Itsuki Koizumi. She retains her goal of finding aliens, time travelers and espers, as well as her energetic and eccentric character. However, she is much more open about her feelings for Kyon; she takes him out on a date in "Be My Valentine", and in "Her Melancholy", when asked if she is in love with Kyon, she gives a neutral answer.
In an interview, Tanigawa stated that the idea for the character came during a sleepless night at the beginning of the 21st century. Haruhi is considered to have tsundere character traits but is perceived by some as "too energetic" to be a true tsundere. In 2009, IGN ranked her nineteenth on their list of top 25 anime characters.

=== Yuki Nagato ===
Yuki Nagato
- Haruhi Suzumiya character
- First appearance: The Melancholy of Haruhi Suzumiya (2003)
- Voiced by: Minori Chihara (Japanese); Michelle Ruff (English)

In-universe information
- Nationality: Japanese

Yuki Nagato (長門 有希, Nagato Yuki) is a bibliophile humanoid interface that was created by the god-like figure called the Data Integration Thought Entity. Yuki's responsibilities involve monitoring Haruhi and the investigation of an unexplained "explosion of data" three years before the present story. She can manipulate her surrounding environment, or "data" as quoted by her. Yuki is usually very terse but can speak at length when it has to do with her mission or a problem that has arisen. While she always seems engrossed in her reading, she comments that she is only relatively interested in them. Yuki gives hints and aid to Kyon. Due to her extraterrestrial nature, she almost never displays involuntary emotional responses or tics, but there are times when she shows interest in things, such as programming computer games and playing them, as well as reading.
In The Disappearance of Haruhi Suzumiya novel and film, the unpleasant emotions developed throughout the series, caused by the people around her, make her wish for a normal world, and she betrays the Data Integration Thought Entity and the SOS Brigade to make her wish reality. After the situation is resolved, the Data Integration Thought Entity contemplates withdrawing Yuki from Earth due to the danger her instability poses; this is an ongoing subplot for the remainder of the series.
She is also the heroine of the spin-off series The Disappearance of Nagato Yuki-chan. In this series, Nagato is a drastically altered version of her character from The Disappearance of Haruhi Suzumiya: she is not a bibliophile (in "Someday in the Rain" Kyon goes so far as to say she has never shown the least interest in books), and instead plays portable video games obsessively, even neglecting sleep to do so. She has a crush on Kyon (her classmate in this universe) and idolizes Haruhi Suzumiya, admiring her confidence and sense of personal pride. In "Give Me Your Hand..." she has an accident, a near-hit with a car that possesses her with a different personality, the quiet and stoic character shown in The Melancholy of Haruhi Suzumiya. With her inevitable disappearance drawing near, she confesses to Kyon before she disappears with the other Yuki taking her place.

=== Mikuru Asahina ===
Mikuru Asahina
- Haruhi Suzumiya character
- First appearance: The Melancholy of Haruhi Suzumiya (2003)
- Voiced by: Yūko Gotō (Japanese); Stephanie Sheh (English)

In-universe information
- Nationality: Japanese

Mikuru Asahina (朝比奈 みくる, Asahina Mikuru) is a time traveler from the distant future who is assigned to investigate the reason behind the inability to travel to any point more than three years before the present story. Mikuru is a soft-spoken girl, the lowest in her Time Travelers' Committee. At the beginning of the series, she is kidnapped by Haruhi and regularly used as sex appeal. She often tries to explain what is going on but is heavily censored by an undisclosed future technology which makes her say "classified information" in place of anything she is not authorized to speak about to people of the past. Haruhi loves dressing up Mikuru in (usually embarrassing) outfits, claiming that she is the "mascot" of the SOS Brigade.
Kyon appears to have a crush on her. Haruhi is jealous of her and Kyon's relationship at first, but later in the series is increasingly unconcerned with their interactions. Despite this, Mikuru remains terrified of her. In the anime and novels Mikuru discourages Kyon from acting upon any feelings that he may have for her, explaining that he is Haruhi's "chosen person." In The Boredom of Haruhi Suzumiya light novel she implies that if he is nice to her, bad things will continue to befall her. She is also a supporting character in the spin-off series The Disappearance of Nagato Yuki-chan, in which she is not a time traveler but retains her character from The Disappearance of Haruhi Suzumiya.

=== Itsuki Koizumi ===
Itsuki Koizumi
- Haruhi Suzumiya character
- First appearance: The Melancholy of Haruhi Suzumiya (2003)
- Voiced by: Daisuke Ono (Japanese); Johnny Yong Bosch (English)

In-universe information
- Nationality: Japanese

Itsuki Koizumi (古泉 一樹, Koizumi Itsuki) is an esper who, like the other members of "The Agency," suddenly acquired the power to explore "Closed Space" and combat the Celestials that Haruhi Suzumiya creates when she is stressed three years before the present story. He is fairly carefree and always smiling. Kyon is annoyed by his habit of putting his face close to that of the person he is talking to, his arguing contradictory theories for rhetorical purposes, and his half-joking insinuations of a romance between Kyon and Haruhi, and often threatens to hit him. He openly expresses fondness for the other SOS Brigade members, Kyon and Haruhi in particular, but explains to Kyon that Mikuru, or anyone, could be putting up a fake personality and deceiving everyone.
Unlike Mikuru, Itsuki believes that aliens, time travelers, and espers would not normally exist, and were created three years ago when Haruhi wished for them to exist. He is also a supporting character in the spin-off series The Disappearance of Nagato Yuki-chan in which he is not an esper, but a normal high school boy who attends Kouyouen Academy with Haruhi Suzumiya. He retains the same character he had in The Disappearance of Haruhi Suzumiya where he is in love with Haruhi.

=== Yasumi Watahashi ===
Yasumi Watahashi (渡橋 泰水, Watahashi Yasumi) is a student who briefly joins the Brigade in the tenth novel, claiming to be a first-year student at North High. She is instead a literal deus ex machina, created by Haruhi to block Sasaki's interactions with Kyon. When the crisis is resolved, she disappears from existence with Haruhi believing she was a middle school student who sneaked into the brigade. When written out in katakana, her name forms an anagram for 'I am Suzumiya' ("Watahashi wa Suzumiya").

== Other North High students ==
Ryoko Asakura (朝倉 涼子, Asakura Ryōko)
Voiced by: Natsuko Kuwatani (Japanese); Bridget Hoffman (English)
Ryoko is Yuki's backup and, as such, is another "humanoid interface." Like Yuki, she finds it difficult to empathize with humans. Unlike Yuki, she possesses exceptional social skills, and successfully passes herself off as a compassionate and hard-working high school girl. Her enormous popularity made her the unanimous choice for class president of Kyon's homeroom. She is unable to befriend Haruhi in order to better observe her, so when she notices Kyon successfully interacting with Haruhi, she encourages him to "open her up to the class". She later tries to kill Kyon with a combat knife in the hopes of catalyzing an observable reaction from Haruhi. Yuki stops her and removes her from the school, using the cover story that Ryoko moved to Canada. Ryoko returns in the light novel The Surprise of Haruhi Suzumiya, fulfilling her role as Yuki's backup when Yuki is disabled by the Heavenly Canopy Domain. However, the Data Integration Thought Entity still regards her as a risk due to her attempt to kill Kyon, and she is given limited authority to act.
An alternate version of Ryoko appears in The Disappearance of Haruhi Suzumiya. In this story Yuki alters reality to make herself a normal human, and remakes Ryoko into a protector for her. She is destroyed by another Yuki that came from a few months later in order to restore reality to its former state.
In the spin-off miniseries The Melancholy of Haruhi-chan Suzumiya, she appears as a chibi form dubbed 'Achakura' as the result of a failed reincarnation, and moves in with Yuki after she saves Achakura from a cat. She is subject to pranks from Yuki, such as being transported around in a baby carrier or dressed up like a Hinamatsuri doll. In Nyorōn Churuya-san, her appearance is similar to Tsuruya/Churuya and she has a crush on Kyon. She is one of the main characters in the spin-off manga, The Disappearance of Nagato Yuki-chan. In Yuki-chan, she has none of her psychopathic tendencies, and instead serves as a neighbour and sisterly/motherly figure for Nagato - doing things like waking her up and making her dinner. In this reality, she actually does move to Canada to study.
Tsuruya (鶴屋)
Voiced by: Yuki Matsuoka (Japanese); Kari Wahlgren (English)
Tsuruya is the hyperactive friend of Mikuru (from the current time plane) recognizable by her loud voice, calf-length hair, and prominent upper canine. Her canine gives her an idiosyncratic speech pattern, causing her to misspeak by leaving out syllables. Her speech pattern is often accompanied with a lisp and her catch phrases "megas" and "nyoro". She has a cheerful and friendly disposition. She is prone to long fits of unrestrained and intense laughter at things she considers even the slightest bit humorous. She is the heiress of the wealthy and venerable Tsuruya family, which purportedly collaborates with Itsuki's Agency.
Though not a member of the SOS Brigade, Tsuruya is used as an extra body for some of their activities, playing a minor role in "The Adventures of Mikuru Asahina Episode 00" and serving on their baseball team in "The Boredom of Haruhi Suzumiya". She appears sparingly in the anime, but takes on more prominent roles in some of the novels not adapted into anime. In these she confides to Kyon that she is vaguely aware of the SOS Brigade's supernatural nature, but prefers to be involved with them only peripherally. Tsuruya takes care of Mikuru when the latter has a double presence in the 'present' and is the caretaker of a mysterious artifact discovered on her family's grounds, both at Kyon's request.
In the altered reality of The Disappearance of Haruhi Suzumiya, and retaining the character for the spin-off manga The Disappearance of Nagato Yuki-chan, Tsuruya's role is that of Mikuru Asahina's best friend. She is extremely protective of her, but still maintains her cheerful disposition. She is the star of the official gag manga, Nyorōn Churuya-san, featuring a super deformed Tsuruya with a smoked cheese obsession, which later became an anime mini-series. She makes appearances in The Melancholy of Haruhi-chan Suzumiya where she apparently has a rivalry with Sonou Mori.
Taniguchi (谷口)
Voiced by: Minoru Shiraishi (Japanese); Sam Riegel (English)
Taniguchi is a classmate and friend of Kyon. Taniguchi went to the same junior high school as Haruhi while Kunikida went to the same junior high school as Kyon. Like Tsuruya and Kyon's sister, they act as fill-in members for the SOS Brigade when needed. Both of them play small parts in The Adventures of Mikuru Asahina Episode 00. They are friends and are almost always seen together.
Taniguchi is comically lecherous; he gave a 'score' of attractiveness to each first-year girl based upon his tastes and preferences. He remembers the full names of everyone receiving an 'A' rank, with Ryoko receiving an A++ and Nagato receiving an A−. As for Mikuru, her mere presence elicits an altered state of adoration for Taniguchi and Kunikida. He was Kyon's original source of information on Haruhi before he started conversing with her. He inadvertently lets slip that he is the person who dated Haruhi for the shortest time, five minutes, while she was in junior high. Kyon and Taniguchi share a typical teenage male friendship, openly deriding and being cruel to each other, with any animosity forgotten by the next time they meet.
In The Melancholy of Haruhi-chan Suzumiya he usually gets the short end of the stick in the episodes that he appears in. This includes being on a scavenger hunt for so long that the game was over when he came back and becoming an "oni" when in fact all that Haruhi assigned for him was to sit still in "icy isolation".
Kunikida (国木田)
Voiced by: Megumi Matsumoto (Japanese); Brianne Siddall (English)
Kunikida is a friend and classmate of Kyon. Kunikida is much quieter than Taniguchi with the latter doing most of the talking when the two are around. Kunikida plays a minor role and does not contribute much dialogue. Since he and Kyon went to the same junior high school, he is more familiar with him. He is smarter than his friends Taniguchi and Kyon, at one time explaining a difficult concept to Taniguchi. Kunikida is included in certain SOS Brigade activities when there is a shortage of people, such as the baseball game and the movie The Adventures of Mikuru Asahina.
The Computer Research Society President (コンピュータ研究会部長, Konpyūta Kenkyūkai Buchō)
Voiced by: Nobuyuki Kobushi (Japanese); Dave Wittenberg (English)
He is the president of the Computer Research Society (or Computer Society), which shares a room adjacent to the SOS Brigade. The President is never given a name other than "Computer Society President" or variations upon that term (all that is known of his name is the first syllable: "ya"). He and his club are blackmailed into giving away their best computer and wiring the Brigade's clubroom for an internet connection. He later challenges the SOS Brigade to a rigged contest using the Computer Research Society's own basic science-fiction strategy game, The Day of Sagittarius III, betting four of his club's laptops in an attempt to reclaim the originally pilfered computer. Yuki counters the Research Society's cheating by reprogramming the code in-match, and the SOS Brigade wins. The President is impressed enough to ask Yuki to participate in his club's activities, which she agrees to.
In "Mystérique Sign", he is trapped in an alternate spatial frame that was unknowingly triggered by Haruhi. He was, in turn, freed by the other members of the SOS Brigade.
Emiri Kimidori (喜緑 江美里, Kimidori Emiri)
Voiced by: Yuri Shiratori (Japanese); Hynden Walch (English)
A soft-spoken, well-groomed second-year student with long, light green hair, Emiri first appears in "Mystérique Sign" seeking counsel from the SOS Brigade. Although she claims to be the girlfriend of the Computer Research Society President, Kyon later discovers that this is not the case, and that Emiri is a humanoid interface like Yuki and Ryoko. Emiri later becomes the secretary to the president of the Student Council. By this time, it is implied that she is Yuki's superior, or at the very least her minder, as a consequence of Yuki's world-altering actions. Emiri works part-time (against the rules of the School Council) as a waitress in the cafe frequented by the SOS Brigade.
Student Council Chairman (生徒会長, Seitokaichō)
A student hired by the Agency to play the part of the archetypal nemesis to Haruhi, as yet another attempt to relieve her boredom. He attacks the Brigade, on the grounds that it is not a legitimate club, using the school rules. When acting as Haruhi's nemesis, he wears glasses and acts cold and polite. When Haruhi is not present, he is easygoing and brash, removes his glasses, and sometimes smokes cigarettes. He has noted that he is growing accustomed to his role and that he enjoys wielding power. His name remains unknown.

=== ENOZ ===
ENOZ is an all-girl student band featured in "Live a Live" and its anime adaptation "Live Alive", though the band is not named in "Live a Live". The name derives from the last names of the members: Enomoto, Nakanishi, Okajima, and Zaizen. During the high school festival Enomoto (lead singer and guitarist) has tonsillitis and Nakanishi (guitar) suffers a sprained wrist, so Haruhi and Yuki fill in for the missing members. In "Live a Live", the band consists of only three members; the singer/guitarist was split into two characters for "Live Alive".

In "Live a Live" the impromptu band performs a full set, while in "Live Alive" they only perform two songs, "God Knows" and "Lost My Music", with Haruhi explaining that she and Yuki didn't have time to learn any more. The episode trims both songs down as inserts. "God Knows" has all of the song save for about half of the guitar solos during the beginning and end, and the entire second stanza and chorus. "Lost My Music" barely finishes the first stanza and chorus, leaving the second and third out.

"God knows" and "Lost My Music" were included in the soundtrack EP Suzumiya Haruhi no Tsumeawase (涼宮ハルヒの詰合 ~TVアニメ「涼宮ハルヒの憂鬱」劇中歌集シングル~). The sole vocals for ENOZ are sung by Japanese pop singer and voice actress Aya Hirano, who voices the main character of the series, Haruhi Suzumiya. In addition, Hirano sings the main opening and ending themes for the series. (See a listing of Haruhi Suzumiya albums.) Susumu Nishikawa (西川 進) plays the guitar, Takeshi Taneda (種子田 健) the bass, and Yutaka Odawara (小田原 豊) the drums. In the English version, the songs are performed by Wendee Lee, Haruhi's voice actress.

ENOZ is a homage to the real life all-girl J-pop band Zone. Its name is simply "Zone" spelled backwards.

The members of ENOZ are:

Miyuki Enomoto (榎本 美夕紀, Enomoto Miyuki)
Voiced by: Mai Kadowaki (Japanese); Michelle Ruff (English)
Is the lead singer and guitarist in the band (the Italia Mondial II Woody Deluxe Woodtop used by Haruhi is hers).
Takako Nakanishi (中西 貴子, Nakanishi Takako)
Voiced by: Ryoko Nagata (Japanese); Megan Hollingshead (English)
Plays guitar in the band (the White Limited Edition 1966 Gibson SG used by Yuki is hers).
Mizuki Okajima (岡島 瑞樹, Okajima Mizuki)
Voiced by: Mina Hiroe (Japanese); Patricia Ja Lee (English)
Plays drums in the band, shown to be a Pearl Drum set in the anime.
Mai Zaizen (財前 舞, Zaizen Mai)
Voiced by: Sara Nakayama (Japanese); Kari Wahlgren (English)
Plays bass in the band (is shown using a green Fender Precision Bass).

== Agency ==
The Agency is an organization of espers who believe that Haruhi had converted them into espers in the year 0. Among the members of the Agency are:

Keiichi Tamaru (多丸 圭一, Tamaru Keiichi)
Voiced by: Kazuhiko Inoue (Japanese); Dave Wittenberg (English)
Supposedly a distant relative of Itsuki Koizumi's. He is a wealthy middle-age man who has a private villa on a small isolated isle. He played a part in the murder mysteries, as well as the other three agency members, that were meant to alleviate Haruhi's boredom.
Yutaka Tamaru (多丸 裕, Tamaru Yutaka)
Voiced by: Toshiyuki Morikawa (Japanese); Vic Mignogna (English)
Keiichi Tamaru's purported younger brother. Koizumi suggested that Keiichi and Yutaka merely pretend to be brothers.
Sonou Mori (森 園生, Mori Sonou)
Voiced by: Akane Omae (Japanese); Hynden Walch (English)
She leads negotiations with Mikuru Asahina's captors in The Intrigues of Haruhi Suzumiya, suggesting that she has a higher ranking position in the Agency. She appeared as a maid in the murder mysteries. In The Melancholy of Haruhi-chan Suzumiya, Mori has an estranged relationship with Tsuruya as she constantly receives an uneasy feeling when Mori is around. They engage in a battle scene when attending a mall exhibition. The reason for their hatred is unknown. However, it seems they can put aside their differences for a while as shown in the light novels, when they laugh when they couldn't resist punching the fruit instead of picking it. Mori appears regularly in The Melancholy of Haruhi-chan Suzumiya parody manga, often as a pawn or victim of Koizumi's or Suzumiya's games and plots, sometimes forced to act or dress in a manner offending her sensibilities.
In the Disappearance of Nagato Yuki-chan, Mori is a gym teacher at North High - retaining the role she occasionally plays on Haruhi-chan.
Arakawa (新川)
Voiced by: Akio Ōtsuka (Japanese); Michael Forest (English)
His first name remains unknown. He appeared as a multi-talented butler in the murder mysteries. He also plays the part of Itsuki's taxi driver on numerous occasions.

== Sasaki's group ==
Fujiwara (藤原, Fujiwara)
His real name is unknown. In The Dissociation of Haruhi Suzumiya, he identifies himself as Fujiwara, a blatantly false name, since it references an ancient Japanese family. He is a time traveler, but his group "does not wish for the existence of time travelers, or for the possibility of time travel." Kyon notes that he seems to assume a sneering manner and cartoonishly villainous behavior in order to make people dislike him.
In The Intrigues of Haruhi Suzumiya, he has a tense conversation with Kyon and Mikuru, holding an important item. He returns the item to them, explaining that it was a pre-determined event and that the object in question was "an important artifact for the future." He attempts to kidnap Mikuru later in the book. He returns in The Dissociation of Haruhi Suzumiya, allied with Kuyoh Suoh and Kyoko Tachibana in an effort to transfer Haruhi's power to Sasaki. In The Surprise of Haruhi Suzumiya it is revealed that he is Mikuru's brother, and that his goal is to restore the original timeline in which Mikuru exists.
Kuyoh Suoh (周防 九曜, Suō Kuyō)
A humanoid interface created by the 'Canopy Dominion' rather than the Data Overmind that spawned Yuki Nagato and Emiri Kimidori. Kuyoh has extremely long hair and remains mainly unnoticed by human beings, most likely due to a form of data manipulation. Her purpose on Earth remains unclear, although her patrons have an interest in Haruhi. They are generally hostile to humanoid interfaces from Yuki's side. Kyon considers her to be much cruder than Nagato; she has difficulty with communicating, her words often nonsensical, and her sense of individuality is very weak. In an attempt to get closer to Haruhi, she dated Taniguchi for two months before realizing that she had mistaken him for Kyon.
When she fights Asakura Ryoko and Kimidori Emiri, they note that she does not require any requests or permission to alter data, as there was no data leaving or entering the space. The assumption for this is the Canopy Dominion does not have a consciousness, leaving a mystery behind why they have an interface on Earth.
Kyōko Tachibana (橘 京子, Tachibana Kyōko)
A member of an organization of espers, similar to Itsuki Koizumi's. Both groups realized their powers at the same time, but where Koizumi's group recognized Haruhi as the source of their abilities, Kyōko's group was certain that Kyon's school friend Sasaki was the source of theirs. The powers wielded by the organizations are slightly different; Kyōko can only enter closed spaces which were created by Sasaki, and Koizumi in turn can only enter closed spaces created by Haruhi. Kyōko's group believes that the powers wielded by Haruhi rightfully belong to Sasaki and should be transferred to her. To this end they have tried to enlist the aid of Kyon, Kuyoh Suoh's patrons, and the time traveling faction represented by Fujiwara. Kyōko's group and the Agency are in conflict, especially since the former participated in an attempt to kidnap Mikuru.
She claims that transferring the power from Haruhi to Sasaki would be in the world's best interest since Sasaki, as reflected by her inert closed spaces, has no impulse to use her power to change the world. Kyōko is friendly and idealistic, and maintains a friendship with Sasaki even after the attempt to transfer power to her is thwarted.
Sasaki (佐々木)
A friend of Kyon's from middle school. Like Haruhi, her subconscious creates closed spaces, and she has the capacity to wield Haruhi's world-changing power, though she does not actually possess it. She first appears in The Dissociation of Haruhi Suzumiya. She introduces herself as a "close friend" of Kyon's, evoking feelings of confusion in Haruhi, since Kyon never mentioned Sasaki to her. Many of Kyon's middle school friends, including Kunikida and Nakagawa, developed the mistaken impression that Kyon and Sasaki were boyfriend and girlfriend, when they had simply become good friends due to attending the same cram and middle schools. Sasaki later tells Kyon that she is more comfortable being with him than other boys precisely because he never tried to turn their relationship in a romantic direction. Sasaki is prone to odd philosophical musings and atypical behavior. For instance, she uses the male 'boku' for 'I' when speaking with boys.
Sasaki is intelligent and eccentric. She is somewhat dismissive of emotion, considering it an inhibition to human development. However, she said that she was unable to keep from smiling around Kyon and there was a personal matter between them that she could not bring herself to talk with him about. Though she is friendly with her three supernatural companions, particularly Kyoko, she does not share their wish for her to take on Haruhi's power, not wanting the responsibility.
Sky Canopy Dominion/Macrospatial Quantum Cosmic Existence (天蓋領域, Tengai Ryōiki)
An alien race, most likely data-based like the Data Overmind, that was behind the events of "Snowy Mountain Syndrome". The race is so different from the Data Entity that the two have been completely incapable of communicating with each other, although they have been aware of each other for eons. Yuki Nagato considers the appearance of a Canopy Dominion-created interface capable of linguistic communication great progress, despite the hostilities between the two, who seem roughly equal in power. Yuki's illnesses in "Snowy Mountain Syndrome" and The Surprise of Haruhi Suzumiya were later revealed to have been caused by unsuccessful attempts by the Sky Canopy Dominion to communicate with her.

== Other characters ==
Kyon's Little Sister (キョンの妹, Kyon no Imōto)
Voiced by: Sayaka Aoki (Japanese); Kari Wahlgren (English)
Not much is revealed about Kyon's fifth-grade sister; not even her real name is given. Other characters simply refer to the ten-year-old as 'Kyon's (Younger) Sister' or Little Sis (妹ちゃん, Imōto-chan). She has relatively few speaking lines in the anime, though she appears in The Adventures of Mikuru Asahina: Episode 00, episode six, and fourteen, fulfilling the duties of an irrepressible younger sister. She has an even smaller role in the original novels than in the anime. Usually, her presence is made apparent when Kyon is at home.
She is carefree, happy and playful and is the force behind the use of the nickname "Kyon"; after she heard their aunt call her older brother such, she started using the nickname as well in front of his school friends. From there, the name spread and stuck. She seems to get along well with all of the SOS Brigade, especially with Mikuru and Tsuruya, sharing a sister-like relationship with them. In the manga Kyon sees a similarity between his sister and Haruhi, especially when they are playing detectives.
Okabe (岡部)
Voiced by: Eiji Yanagisawa (Japanese); Michael McConnohie (English)
The homeroom teacher of Kyon and Haruhi's class. He is in charge of the handball club at the school. First name remains unknown.
Miyoko "Miyokichi" Yoshimura (吉村 美代子（ミヨキチ）, Yoshimura Miyoko)
A girl whom Kyon wrote about when forced to come up with a romantic story for a Literary club assignment. Although Kyon appeared to have had a romantic date with her, the truth was she was a classmate and friend of his sister. She had asked Kyon to accompany her to see a horror movie that required a guardian over the age of twelve.
Nakagawa (中河)
A friend of Kyon's from middle school. He believed he fell in love with Nagato at first sight. So extreme was this effect that he dedicated himself fully to his studies in the hopes of someday becoming a worthy suitor to Nagato, whom he regarded as a "goddess." In reality, he only saw the Data Overmind, with Nagato as an interface, and was overwhelmed by the wealth of knowledge it possessed. His ability to see the Entity is later removed by Nagato. Kyon suspects that he might have been an esper like Koizumi.
Yoshimi Sakanaka (阪中 佳実, Sakanaka Yoshimi)
Voiced by: Mai Aizawa
The SOS Brigade's second client, who believed that the strange behavior exhibited by her dog Rousseau was the result of spiritual activity. After receiving a flier from Haruhi's ill-fated plan to advertise while wearing bunny girl costumes during the beginning of the school year, Sakanaka followed the flier's advice and presented the brigade with her problem. Her problems were complicated when the SOS Brigade failed to find anything and her dog mysteriously became ill. Nagato was able to identify elementary silicon-based data lifeforms as the cause of the illness. With the help of Kyon and Koizumi, Nagato transferred the lifeforms to Shamisen to preserve the data lifeforms without causing the dogs to suffer. Sakanaka, with several other witnesses of Nagato's efforts, believes that her dog was cured using an obscure folk remedy Nagato had once read about.
Shamisen (シャミセン)
Voiced by: Kenichi Ogata (Japanese); Steve Kramer (English) (Season 1), Michael McConnohie (Season 2)
A stray calico cat selected by Haruhi to play the role of Yuki's familiar for their film The Adventures of Mikuru Asahina, Shamisen is unusual in the sense that he is a male calico cat. During filming, Haruhi's reality-altering powers temporarily give Shamisen the ability to speak. He is adopted by Kyon after the completion of the movie and is given the nickname "Shami" by his sister. (The word shamisen refers to a three-stringed Japanese musical instrument with a rectangular body traditionally covered with skin from a cat or a dog.)
Shamisen #2 (シャミセン2号, Shamisen Ni-gō)
A cat who's nicknamed Shami Two (Shami-nii), although she is female. Itsuki Koizumi found her for a special SOS Brigade-related detective game, where Shami-nii served as a decoy and stand-in for the real Shamisen. After the game, she apparently becomes Koizumi's pet.
Kimidori (キミドリ)
Voiced by: Minoru Shiraishi (Japanese); Sam Riegel (English)
Introduced in the spin-off The Melancholy of Haruhi-chan Suzumiya, Kimidori is a "dog" that was made by Yuki using balloons Kyon had given her, which she then used her unique abilities on to create into a walking, talking creature, although the creation process was horrifying. Whilst it initially appears as a cute, friendly creature, Kimidori turns out to be another way of pulling pranks on Achakura when she's at home. He speaks in a rather distinguished voice and even requests to be called 'Kimidori-san'. His name comes from the color of the yellow-green balloon from which he is formed, as well as a reference to the main series' Emiri Kimidori.
