= Riot Girl =

Studio album by Aya Hirano
- Released: (Japan) 16 July 2008
- Recorded: 2006–2008
- Genre: J-pop; techno-pop; pop punk
- Length: 62:32
- Label: Lantis
- Producer: Yuka Sakurai

Aya Hirano chronology
| Riot Girl (2008) | Speed Star (2009) |

Riot Girl is the debut studio album by Japanese singer/voice actress Aya Hirano.

== Release ==
The album was released on 16 July 2008. It contains songs from her entire non-character song discography up until her 2008 single, "Unnamed World." It contains 7 all-new songs and the A-side songs from her first 7 singles (with the exception being the B-side of Unnamed World instead of the A-side).

== Sales ==
The album made its debut on the Oricon charts at number 6, selling approximately 23,000 units in its first week of sales.

== Track listing ==
| No. | Title | Lyrics | Music | Arrangement | Length |
|---|---|---|---|---|---|
| 1. | "LOVE★GUN" | Aya Hirano | Katsuhiko Kurosu | nishi-ken, Katsuhiko Kurosu | 3:50 |
| 2. | "Hero" | Aya Hirano | nishi-ken | nishi-ken | 4:23 |
| 3. | "MonStAR" | meg rock | Katsuhiko Kurosu | nishi-ken | 4:23 |
| 4. | "Ashita no Prism (明日のプリズム)" | Saori Kodama | Hiroyuki Maezawa | Daisuke Kato | 4:00 |
| 5. | "Breakthrough (Album Ver.)" | Ikuko Ebata | TARAWO | Katsuhiko Kurosu | 3:23 |
| 6. | "Bōken Desho Desho? (冒険でしょでしょ？)" (The Melancholy of Haruhi Suzumiya opening theme) | Aki Hata | Akiko Tomita | Takahiro Endo | 4:19 |
| 7. | "Aimai Scream (曖昧スクリーム)" | meg rock | Katsuhiko Kurosu | nishi-ken | 4:40 |
| 8. | "Yorokobi no Uta (ヨロコビの歌)" | Saori Kodama | Katsuhiko Kurosu | Katsuhiko Kurosu | 4:41 |
| 9. | "Maybe I can't good-bye." | Aya Hirano | Katsuhiko Kurosu | Katsuhiko Kurosu | 4:05 |
| 10. | "Neophilia" | Aya Hirano, Aki Hata | Shinya Saito | Shinya Saito (Guitar by Yutaka Ishii, Bass by Katsuhiko Kurosu) | 4:14 |
| 11. | "Harmonia Vita" (Sigma Harmonics theme song) | Aki Hata | Shinya Saito | Shinya Saito | 5:20 |
| 12. | "For you" | Aya Hirano | Katsuhiko Kurosu | Katsuhiko Kurosu | 4:30 |
| 13. | "Hōshi no Kakera (星のカケラ)" | Aya Hirano | Shinya Saito | Shinya Saito, Kaoru Okubo | 5:57 |
| 14. | "RIOT GIRL" | Aya Hirano | nishi-ken | nishi-ken | 4:51 |

=== Re-release Bonus Tracks ===
| No. | Title | Lyrics | Music | Arrangement | Length |
|---|---|---|---|---|---|
| 15. | "Breakthrough" | Ikuko Ebata | TARAWO | Masaki Suzuki | 3:33 |
| 16. | "Breakthrough" (DJ Laxxell's Single Remix) | Ikuko Ebata | TARAWO | Masaki Suzuki (remixed by DJ Laxxell) | 5:19 |
| 17. | "Bōken Desho Desho? (冒険でしょでしょ？)" (Cascada Remix Radio Edit) | Aki Hata | Akiko Tomita | Takahiro Endo (remix and additional production by Cascada) | 3:57 |
