= List of Haruhi Suzumiya albums =

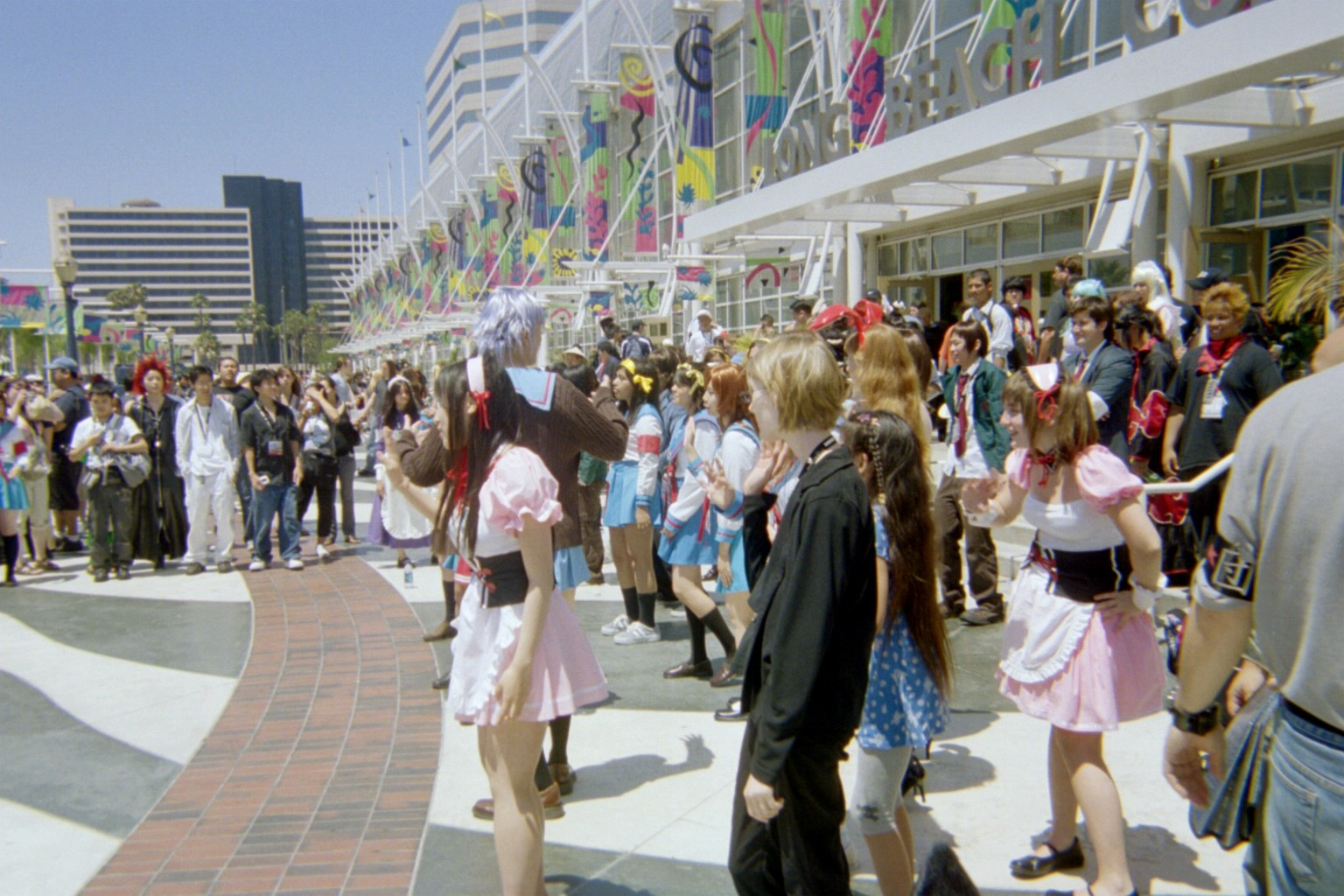
Fans performing the "Hare Hare Yukai" dance at Anime Expo 2007

This is a list of albums attributed to the anime adaptation The Melancholy of Haruhi Suzumiya based on the Haruhi Suzumiya light novel series. There have been three soundtrack singles released for the anime containing the opening, ending, and insert songs featured in the anime series. Three radio drama CDs were released, along with a single which contained the theme songs to the radio dramas. A drama CD was also produced and the final track on the CD contained an original music track. There are nine additional character song albums sung by the voice actors for not only the five main characters in the series, but four other minor characters were also given mini albums.

== Soundtracks ==
=== Bōken Desho Desho? ===
"Bōken Desho Desho?"

Single by Aya Hirano
- Released: April 26, 2006
- Genre: J-pop; akishibu-kei
- Length: 16:10
- Songwriter: unknown

Aya Hirano singles chronology
"Breakthrough"	"Bōken Desho Desho?"	"Suzumiya Haruhi no Tsumeawase"

"Bōken Desho Desho?" (冒険でしょでしょ？, Bōken Desho Desho?; lit. 'It's an adventure, right? Right?') is the opening theme to the Japanese anime The Melancholy of Haruhi Suzumiya, as well as the movie, The Disappearance of Haruhi Suzumiya. It ranked #10 in CD sales on amazon.co.jp when the single was released.

- Oricon Weekly Rank Peak: #10
- Weeks in Chart: 28 weeks
- Sales: 63,371
- 2006 End of Year Chart Rank: #141

==== Track listing ====
1. "Bōken Desho Desho?" (冒険でしょでしょ？) – 4:18
  - Vocals: Haruhi Suzumiya (Aya Hirano)
  - Lyrics: Aki Hata
  - Music: Akiko Tomita
  - Arrangement: Junpei Fujita
2. "Kaze Yomi Ribbon" (風読みリボン, lit.The Ribbon For Reading Wind ) – 3:47
3. "Bōken Desho Desho?" (off vocal) (冒険でしょでしょ？ (off vocal)) – 4:18
4. "Kaze Yomi Ribbon" (off vocal) (風読みリボン (off vocal)) – 3:47

=== Hare Hare Yukai ===
"Hare Hare Yukai"

Single by Aya Hirano, Minori Chihara and Yuko Goto
- Released: May 10, 2006
- Genre: Anime soundtrack, J-pop
- Length: 14:00
- Label: Lantis
- Songwriter: unknown

Aya Hirano, Minori Chihara and Yuko Goto singles chronology
"Hare Hare Yukai"	"Saikyo Pare Parade"

"Hare Hare Yukai" (ハレ晴レユカイ, lit. Sunny Sunny Happiness) is the ending theme to the Japanese anime series The Melancholy of Haruhi Suzumiya. The song is performed in Japanese by Aya Hirano, Minori Chihara and Yuko Goto, the respective voices of the characters Haruhi Suzumiya, Yuki Nagato and Mikuru Asahina from the series.

Due to massive support from fans of the series, the CD maxi single, which also featured the song Welcome UNKNOWN plus karaoke versions of both tracks, reached #5 on the Oricon singles charts, and was the 18th best selling CD single in Japan on May 10, the day it was released. It was also sold out on many online retailers and was amazon.co.jp's #1 selling CD. Hare Hare Yukai won the Radio Kansai Award in 2006, a subset of the Animation Kobe Theme Song Award.

==== Track listing ====
1. "Hare Hare Yukai" (ハレ晴レユカイ) – 3:37
  - Vocals: Haruhi Suzumiya (Aya Hirano), Yuki Nagato )Minori Chihara) and Mikuru Asahina (Yuko Goto)
  - Lyrics: Aki Hata
  - Music: Tomokazu Toshiro
  - Arrangement: Takahiro Ando
2. "Welcome UNKNOWN" (うぇるかむUNKNOWN) – 3:23
3. "Hare Hare Yukai" (off vocal) (ハレ晴レユカイ (off vocal)) – 3:37
4. "Welcome UNKNOWN" (off vocal) (うぇるかむUNKNOWN (off vocal)) – 3:23

=== Suzumiya Haruhi no Tsumeawase ===
Suzumiya Haruhi no Tsumeawase

Soundtrack album by Aya Hirano & Yuko Goto
- Released: June 21, 2006
- Genre: J-pop
- Length: 12:17
- Label: Lantis

Aya Hirano & Yuko Goto chronology
Hare Hare Yukai	Suzumiya Haruhi no Tsumeawase	Haruhi Suzumiya character single

Suzumiya Haruhi no Tsumeawase (涼宮ハルヒの詰合 ～TVアニメ「涼宮ハルヒの憂鬱」劇中歌集シングル～, Suzumiya Haruhi no Tsumeawase: TV Anime "Suzumiya Haruhi no Yūutsu" Geki Chū Kashū Shinguru; lit. The Assortment of Haruhi Suzumiya: Collection of Songs in an Anime "The Melancholy of Haruhi Suzumiya") was first released in Japan on June 21, 2006. In the actual performance, Susumu Nishikawa played the guitar, Takeshi Taneda played the bass guitar, and Yutaka Odawara played drums. Animators traced their performance by rotoscoping, and drew the performance scene in animation.

- Oricon Weekly Rank Peak: #5 (Ties as highest charting release of the Haruhi Suzumiya franchise.)
- Weeks in Chart: 133 weeks (Longest charting release of the Haruhi Suzumiya franchise.)
- Sales: 136,000+ (highest selling)
- 2006 End of Year Chart Rank: #106

==== Track listing ====
1. "God knows…" – 4:39
  - Vocals: Haruhi Suzumiya (Aya Hirano)
  - Music: Satoru Kousaki
  - Arrangement: Satoru Kousaki
  - Lyrics: Aki Hata
2. "Lost my music" – 4:17
  - Vocals: Haruhi Suzumiya (Aya Hirano)
  - Music: Satoru Kousaki
  - Arrangement: Satoru Kousaki
  - Lyrics: Aki Hata
3. "Koi no Mikuru Densetsu" (恋のミクル伝説, The Mikuru Legend of Love) – 3:21
  - Vocals: Mikuru Asahina (Yuko Goto)
  - Music: Satoru Kousaki
  - Arrangement: Satoru Kousaki
  - Lyrics: Yutaka Yamamoto

=== Saikyō Pare Parade ===
"Saikyō Pare Parade"

Single by Aya Hirano, Minori Chihara, and Yuko Goto
- Released: November 22, 2006
- Genre: Single
- Length: 17:46
- Label: Lantis
- Songwriter: unknown

Aya Hirano, Minori Chihara, and Yuko Goto singles chronology
"Hare Hare Yukai"	"Saikyō Pare Parade"

"Saikyō Pare Parade" (最強パレパレード, Saikyō Pare Parēdo) is the second single by Aya Hirano, Minori Chihara and Yuko Goto, the first being Hare Hare Yukai. The songs "Saikyō Pare Parade" and "Unmeiteki Jiken no Kōfuku" were the opening and ending themes respectively for the Haruhi Suzumiya radio dramas. The single was released on November 22, 2006, by Lantis. A cover version and music video was produced by Momoiro Clover in 2009.

- Oricon Weekly Rank Peak: #9
- Weeks in Chart: 10 weeks

==== Track listing ====
1. "Saikyō Pare Parēdo" (最強パレパレード, The Strongest Para Parade) – 4:20
2. "Unmeiteki Jiken no Kōfuku" (運命的事件の幸福, The Bliss of a Fateful Event) – 4:33
3. "Saikyō Pare Parēdo" (off vocal) (最強パレパレード) – 4:20
4. "Unmeiteki Jiken no Kōfuku" (off vocal) (運命的事件の幸福) – 4:33

== Suzumiya Haruhi no Gensō ==
Suzumiya Haruhi no Gensō

Soundtrack album by Tokyo Philharmonic Orchestra
- Released: June 24, 2009
- Genre: Anime soundtrack
- Length: 78:48

Suzumiya Haruhi no Gensō (涼宮ハルヒの弦奏) was a concert held in Tokyo on April 29, 2009, with music by the Tokyo Philharmonic Orchestra and Philip Chu as conductor. The event featured songs and background music from the anime arranged with a classical twist. A CD of the concert was released on June 24, 2009, and a DVD on February 26, 2010.

=== Track listing ===
1. "Koi no Mikuru Densetsu" (恋のミクル伝説)
2. "Itsumo no Fūkei Gekiretsu de Kareinaru Hibi" (いつもの風景~激烈で華麗なる日々)
3. "Saikyō Pare Parade" (最強パレパレード)
4. "Higeki no Heroine: Hi Nichijō e no Sasoi Beach Vacation" (悲劇のヒロイン~非日常への誘い~ビーチバカンス)
5. "Kōchō Kōchō Mikuru no Kokoro Chiisakute mo Suteki na Shiawase Oi Oi Comical Hustle" (好調好調~みくるのこころ~小さくても素敵な幸せ~おいおい~コミカルハッスル)
6. "Bōken Desho Desho?" (冒険でしょでしょ?)
7. "Kōkyō Kyoku Dai 7 Ban C Chōchō Sakuhin 60 "Leningrad" Dai Ichi Gakushō Yori" (交響曲第7番ハ長調作品60「レニングラード」第一楽章より)
8. "Sunao na Kimochi Aru Ame no Hi Haruhi no Omoi" (素直な気持ち~ある雨の日~ハルヒの想い)
9. "The Mysterious Asakura Ryōko no Shinjitsu Fuyu no Ashioto" (ザ・ミステリアス~朝倉涼子の真実~冬の足音)
10. "Lost my music"
11. "SOS Dan Shidō! Nanika ga Okashii" (SOS団始動!~何かがおかしい)
12. "Yuki, Muon, Madobe Nite." (雪、無音、窓辺にて。)
13. "Nodoka na Shōtengai Yuki Tōjō Pinchppoi! Mikuru Henshin! Soshite Sentō! Daidanen" (のどかな商店街~ユキ登場~ピンチっぽい!~ミクル変身!そして戦闘!~大団円)
14. "Hare Hare Yukai" (ハレ晴レユカイ)
15. "God knows..."

== Audio dramas ==
=== Radio dramas ===
==== Volume 1 ====
SOS Dan Radio Shibu Bangai Hen CD Vol.1

Studio album (Radio drama) by Aya Hirano, Minori Chihara and Yuko Goto
- Released: July 5, 2006
- Genre: Radio drama
- Length: 51:50
- Label: Lantis

SOS Dan Radio Shibu Bangai Hen CD Vol.1 (SOS団ラジオ支部 番外編CD Vol.1) is the first volume radio drama CD released July 5, 2006.

- Oricon Weekly Rank Peak: #19
- Weeks in Chart: 4 weeks

===== Track listing =====
1. "Opening" (オープニング) – 2:55
2. "Haruhi Teki Zadan Kai" (ハルヒ的座談会) – 7:53
3. "Burari Fushigi Tansaku Tai Special" (ぶらり不思議探索隊スペシャル) – 7:12
4. "Hirano Aya no Omotenashi" (平野綾のおもてなし) – 2:08
5. "Original Jingle o Tsukurou" (オリジナルジングルを作ろう) – 7:02
6. "Goto Yuko no Omotenashi" (後藤邑子のおもてなし) – 3:19
7. "Suzumiya Haruhi no Taikutsu Shinogi Special" (涼宮ハルヒの退屈しのぎスペシャル) – 11:03
8. "Chihara Minori no Omotenashi" (茅原実里のおもてなし) – 2:16
9. "Asahina Mikuru no Dai Yogen" (朝比奈みくるの大予言) – 5:44
10. "Ending" (エンディング) – 2:18

==== Volume 2 ====
SOS Dan Radio Shibu Bangai Hen CD Vol.2

Studio album (Radio drama) by Aya Hirano, Minori Chihara and Yuko Goto
- Released: September 21, 2006
- Genre: Radio drama
- Length: 57:16
- Label: Lantis

SOS Dan Radio Shibu Bangai Hen CD Vol.2 (SOS団ラジオ支部 番外編CD Vol.2) is the second volume radio drama CD which was released on September 21, 2006.

- Oricon Weekly Rank Peak: #27
- Weeks in Chart: 4 weeks

===== Track listing =====
1. "Opening" (オープニング) – 4:18
2. "Haruhi Teki Zadankai ~TV Anime "Suzumiya Haruhi no Yuuutsu" o Furikaette~" (ハルヒ的座談会～TVアニメ「涼宮ハルヒの憂鬱」を振り返って～) – 7:30
3. "Original Jingle o Tsukurou II" (オリジナルジングルを作ろう II) – 6:05
4. "Burari Fushigi Tansaku Tai Tokubetsu Hen Enii ni Kike" (ぶらり不思議探索隊特別編・エニーに聞け！) – 23:47
5. "Suzumiya Haruhi no Taikutsu Shinogi Special" (涼宮ハルヒの退屈しのぎスペシャル) – 5:58
6. "Asahina Mikuru no Dai Yogen II" (朝比奈みくるの大予言 II) – 5:44
7. "Ending" (エンディング) – 3:54

==== Volume 3 ====
SOS Dan Radio Shibu Bangai Hen CD Vol.3

Studio album (Radio drama) by Aya Hirano, Minori Chihara, Yuko Goto and Yuki Matsuoka
- Released: December 21, 2006
- Genre: Radio drama
- Length: 71:45
- Label: Lantis

SOS Dan Radio Shibu Bangai Hen CD Vol.3 (SOS団ラジオ支部 番外編CD Vol.3) is the third volume radio drama CD in the series which was released on December 21, 2006.

- Oricon Weekly Rank Peak: #70 (Worst charting release of the whole Haruhi Suzumiya franchise.)
- Weeks in Chart: 3 weeks

===== Track listing =====
1. "Opening" (オープニング) – 6:55
2. "Radio Zadankai "Suzumiya haruhi no Yuuutsu SOS Dan Radio Shibu" o Furikaeru" (ラジオ座談会「涼宮ハルヒの憂鬱SOS団ラジオ支部」を振り返る) – 9:02
3. "Original Jingle o Tsukurou 3" (オリジナルジングルを作ろう 3) – 9:59
4. "Fukkatsu Burari Fushigi Tansaku Tai!" (復活 ぶらり不思議探索隊!) – 8:16
5. "Fukkatsu Yuki ni Kike! Sono 1" (復活 有希に聞け! その1) – 3:29
6. "Asahina Mikuru no Dai Yogen 3" (朝比奈みくるの大予言 3) – 5:20
7. "Tsuruya-san no Megassa Otsukare! Soudan Corner Shucchou Han 1" (鶴屋さんのめがっさおつかれ!相談コーナー 出張版1) – 4:28
8. "Fukkatsu Minority Report!!!" (復活 マイノリティレポート!!!) – 6:02
9. "Fukkatsu Yuki ni Kike! Sono 2" (復活 有希に聞け! その2) – 5:49
10. "Taikutsu Shinogi Special" (退屈しのぎスペシャル) – 4:51
11. "Tsuruya-san no Megasse Otsukare! Soudan Corner Shucchou Han 2" (鶴屋さんのめがっさおつかれ!相談コーナー 出張版2) – 3:54
12. "Ending" (エンディング) – 3:40

=== Drama CD ===
"Sound Around" The Melancholy of Haruhi Suzumiya: Drama CD

Studio album audio drama by eight voice actors from the anime
- Released: January 24, 2007
- Genre: Drama
- Length: 68:17
- Producer: Lantis

Sound Around (サウンドアラウンド, Saundo Araundo) is the title of the drama CD adapted from the Japanese anime series The Melancholy of Haruhi Suzumiya. It was released on January 24, 2007, published by Lantis. The last song on this CD, "First Good-Bye" is the drama CD's theme song sung by Aya Hirano.

- Oricon Weekly Rank Peak: #11
- Weeks in Chart: 5 weeks

==== Track listing ====
1. "Prologue ~Suzumiya Haruhi no Aisatsu~" (プロローグ～涼宮ハルヒのあいさつ～Purorōgu ~Suzumiya Haruhi no Aisatsu~) – 1:36
2. "After Live Alive" (アフター・ライブアライブ, Afutā Raibu Araibu) – 8:12
3. "Sunday At Heavy Metal SOS Brigade" (サンデー・アット・ヘヴィメタSOS団, Sandē atto Hevimeta SOS Dan) – 8:34
4. "The Audition" (ジ・オーディション, Ji Ōdishon) – 6:16
5. "Haruhi Hensōkyoku" (ハルヒ変奏曲) – 11:10
6. "Hi Busshitsu Kakusansei Shindou Kata Kanchi Onpa" (非物質拡散性振動型感知音波) – 7:39
7. "VS Sound Worm" (Meimei, Ore) (VSサウンドウォーム(命名、俺), VS Saundo Wōmu (Meimei, ore)) – 5:50
8. "Chaos of Voice" (ボイスのカオス, Boisu no Kaosu) – 7:50
9. "Epilogue ~Omatsuri Sawagi wa Mada Mada Kore Kara~" (エピローグ～お祭り騒ぎはまだまだこれから～, Epirōgu ~Omatsuri Sawagi Wa Mada Mada Kore Kara~) – 6:34
10. "First Good-Bye" – 4:36

==== Voice actors ====
- Aya Hirano as Haruhi Suzumiya (all) and all the main characters (track 8)
- Minori Chihara as Yuki Nagato
- Yuko Goto as Mikuru Asahina
- Tomokazu Sugita as Kyon
- Daisuke Ono as Itsuki Koizumi
- Yuki Matsuoka as Tsuruya
- Minoru Shiraishi as Taniguchi
- Sayaka Aoki as Kyon's Sister

== Character song singles ==
Nine music singles for The Melancholy of Haruhi Suzumiya have been released featuring songs sung by the voice actors of the characters in the anime. These include: the three main female and two main male characters in the series along with four other supporting female characters. The first three released included songs by Aya Hirano as Haruhi Suzumiya, Minori Chihara as Yuki Nagato and Yuko Goto as Mikuru Asahina. Moreover, two additional character CDs were released on December 6, 2006, sung by Yuki Matsuoka as Tsuruya and Natsuko Kuwatani as Ryoko Asakura. Two more character CDs were released on January 24, 2007, sung by Sayaka Aoki as Kyon's Sister and Yuri Shiratori as Emiri Kimidori. Finally, the CDs for Itsuki Koizumi and Kyon were released on February 21, 2007.

Each of the nine albums feature the ending theme song "Hare Hare Yukai". Other than the three main female character's versions which are solo cover versions of the original, there are some alterations. For Tsuruya's version as well as Ryoko's version, the lyrics were changed to fit the character; Tsuruya's version contains her catchphrase "nyoro", while Ryoko reverses the optimistic lyrics to convey futility and destruction. However, while Tsuruya's and Ryoko's versions have the same arrangements as the original version, the last four released have their arrangements changed along with the lyrics. Kyon's Sister's version is very upbeat; Emiri's version is very fact-based; Itsuki's version talks about his ESP; and Kyon reflects about his now-disturbed life in his version.
