= Speed Star (album) =

Studio album by Aya Hirano
- Released: November 18, 2009
- Recorded: 2008–2009
- Genre: J-pop
- Length: 49:50
- Label: Lantis

Aya Hirano chronology
| Riot Girl (2008) | Speed Star (2009) |

Speed Star is the second studio album by Japanese singer/voice actress Aya Hirano, released by Lantis on November 18, 2009. On September 1, 2009, the album was announced to be released, on her official website.

== Album ==
The album includes her three singles "Unnamed World", "Set Me Free/Sing A Song!" and "Super Driver", but does not include her collaboration single with Tsunku, "Namida Namida Namida". The single from the album, "Super Driver" was used as the opening theme of the 2009 anime adaptation of Suzumiya Haruhi series.

The first-press limited edition came with a DVD which included the music video of its title tune "Speed Star".

== Reception ==
The album sold over 20,000 copies in its initial week, debuting at No. 4 on the Oricon weekly album charts.

== Track listing ==
1. Stereotype (Inst.)
2. Super Driver
3. Sing A Song!
4. Oh! My Darlin'
5. Kiss Me
6. Mizutamari (水たまり)
7. Ano Hana no Yo ni (あの花のように)
8. Aishite (アイシテ!)
9. VOXX
10. Set Me Free
11. Lock-On
12. Speed Star
13. Unnamed World
