= Hisaki =

Hisaki may refer to:

- Hisaki (satellite), a Japanese space telescope
- A geographical feature in Kagoshima Prefecture, Japan

== People with the given name ==
- Hisaki Kato (加藤 久輝, born 1982), Japanese mixed martial artist and kickboxer
- Hisaki Matsuura (松浦 寿輝, born 1954), a Japanese poet
