= 1st Seiyu Awards =

2007 Japanese voice acting awards

- Awarded for: Voice acting in Japan
- Date: March 7, 2007
- Location: Akiba 3D Theater; Akihabara, Tokyo
- Country: Japan

Highlights
- Best Lead Actor: Jun Fukuyama
- Best Lead Actress: Romi Park
- Website: www.seiyuawards.jp

The 1st Seiyu Awards ceremony was held on March 3, 2007, at the Akiba 3D Theater in Akihabara, Tokyo. General voting categories had 10 nominations each for Best Lead (actor/actress), Best Supporting (actor/actress), Rookie (actor/actress), Singing, and Personality. Special Achievement, Achievement, and Synergy Awards were selected by the event without nominations. The period of general voting lasted from October 21, 2006, to January 10, 2007.

Winners are listed below.

| Winners | Agency | Characters | Anime |
|---|---|---|---|
Best Actor in leading role
| Jun Fukuyama | Production Baobab | Lelouch Lamperouge | Code Geass - Lelouch of the Rebellion |
Best Actress in leading role
| Romi Park | Theatrical group En | Nana Osaki | NANA |
Best Actors in supporting roles
| Akira Ishida | Mausu Promotion | Athrun Zala | Mobile Suit Gundam Seed Destiny |
| Kōki Miyata | 81 Produce | Kazumi Yoshinaga | Yoshinaga-san Chi no Gargoyle |
Best Actresses in supporting roles
| Ami Koshimizu | Gekidan Wakakusa | Kallen Stadtfeld | Code Geass - Lelouch of the Rebellion |
| Yuko Goto | Production Baobab | Mikuru Asahina | The Melancholy of Haruhi Suzumiya |
Best Rookie actors
| Tetsuya Kakihara | 81 Produce | Mikoto Yutaka | Princess Princess |
| Masakazu Morita | Aoni Production | Ichigo Kurosaki | Bleach |
Best Rookie actresses
| Yui Kano | Aoni Production | Momoko Kuzuryu | Sumomomo Momomo |
| Aya Hirano | Space Craft | Haruhi Suzumiya | The Melancholy of Haruhi Suzumiya |
Best Personality
| Winner | Agency | Radio Programs | Broadcasting Station |
| Masumi Asano | Arts Vision | A&G Super Radio Show - Anispa! | JOQR |
Best Musical Performance
| Winners | Record Label | Song | Anime |
| Nana Mizuki | King Records | Justice to Believe, opening theme | Wild Arms V |
Special Achievement Award
| Winners | Agency | | |
| Kei Tomiyama | Production Baobab (final career) | | |
Achievement Award
| Toru Ohira | Ohira Production | | |
| Masako Ikeda | Haikyō | | |
| Noriko Ohara | Production Baobab | | |
| Mariko Mukai | 81 Produce | | |
Synergy Award
| Pokémon | | | |

== The First Seiyu Awards Nominees ==
Best Actor in leading role
| Nominees | Characters | Anime | Winners |
| Rikiya Koyama | Hakuoro | Utawarerumono | |
| Takahiro Sakurai | Haseo | .hack//Roots | |
| Tomokazu Sugita | Kyon | The Melancholy of Haruhi Suzumiya | |
| Tomokazu Seki | Kenichi Shirahama | History's Strongest Disciple Kenichi | |
| Jun Fukuyama | Lelouch Lamperouge | Code Geass - Lelouch of the Rebellion | Won |
| Soichiro Hoshi | Keiichi Maebara | Higurashi no Naku Koro ni | |
| Shinichiro Miki | Ryuusei Date | Super Robot Wars Original Generation: Divine Wars | |
| Mamoru Miyano | Light Yagami | Death Note | |
| Masakazu Morita | Ichigo Kurosaki | Bleach | |
| Hiroyuki Yoshino | Zedd | KIBA | |
Best Actress in leading role
| Ayako Kawasumi | Saber | Fate/stay night | |
| Rie Kugimiya | Louise Françoise le Blanc de la Vallière | Zero no Tsukaima | |
| Houko Kuwashima | Kou Shuurei | Saiunkoku Monogatari | |
| Maaya Sakamoto | Haruhi Fujioka | Ouran High School Host Club | |
| Rie Tanaka | Hiroko Matsukata | Hataraki Man | |
| Yukari Tamura | Akazukin | Otogi-Jushi Akazukin | |
| Mamiko Noto | Masane Amaha | Witchblade | |
| Romi Park | Nana Osaki | NANA | Won |
| Aya Hirano | Haruhi Suzumiya | The Melancholy of Haruhi Suzumiya | |
| Yui Horie | Youko | Inukami! | |
Best Actors in supporting roles
| Akira Ishida | Athrun Zala | Mobile Suit Gundam Seed Destiny | Won |
| Ryōtarō Okiayu | Byakuya Kuchiki | Bleach: Memories of Nobody | |
| Katsuyuki Konishi | Shinobu Ousaki | La Corda D'Oro ~primo passo~ | |
| Takahiro Sakurai | Suzaku Kururugi | Code Geass - Lelouch of the Rebellion | |
| Tomokazu Sugita | Takumi Mayama | Honey and Clover II | |
| Kenichi Suzumura | Hikaru Hitachīn | Ouran High School Host Club | |
| Junichi Suwabe | Archer | Fate/stay night | |
| Soichiro Hoshi | Kira Yamato | Mobile Suit Gundam Seed Destiny Final Plus - The Chosen Future | |
| Kouki Miyata | Kazumi Yoshinaga | Yoshinaga-san Chi no Gargoyle | Won |
| Norio Wakamoto | Gargoyle | Yoshinaga-san Chi no Gargoyle | |
Best Actresses in supporting roles
| Rie Kugimiya | Kagura | Gin Tama | |
| Ami Koshimizu | Kallen Stadtfeld | Code Geass - Lelouch of the Rebellion | Won |
| Yuko Goto | Mikuru Asahina | The Melancholy of Haruhi Suzumiya | Won |
| Miyuki Sawashiro | Aruru | Utawarerumono | |
| Rie Tanaka | Lacus Clyne | Mobile Suit Gundam Seed Destiny Final Plus - The Chosen Future | |
| Yukari Tamura | Rika Furude | Higurashi no Naku Koro ni | |
| Megumi Toyoguchi | Hikari | Pokémon Diamond & Pearl | |
| Mamiko Noto | Yakumo Tsukamoto | School Rumble | |
| Aya Hirano | Misa Amane | Death Note | |
| Yuki Matsuoka | Orihime Inoue | Bleach | |
Best Rookie Actors
| Miyu Irino | Syaoran Li | Tsubasa Chronicle | |
| Daisuke Ono | Itsuki Koizumi | The Melancholy of Haruhi Suzumiya | |
| Tetsuya Kakihara | Mikoto Yutaka | Princess Princess | Won |
| Tomokazu Sugita | Kyon | The Melancholy of Haruhi Suzumiya | |
| Tatsuhisa Suzuki | Dick Arkain | Gaiking The Legend of Daikū Maryū | |
| Takuma Terashima | Wataru Harue | Princess Princess | |
| Wataru Hatano | Shinsan | Honey and Clover II | |
| Jun Fukuyama | Lelouch Lamperouge | Code Geass - Lelouch of the Rebellion | |
| Mamoru Miyano | Light Yagami | Death Note | |
| Masakazu Morita | Ichigo Kurosaki | Bleach | Won |
Best Rookie Actresses
| Yui Kano | Momoko Kuzuryu | Sumomomo Momomo | Won |
| Eri Kitamura | Saya Otonashi | Blood+ | |
| Ami Koshimizu | Tenma Tsukamoto | School Rumble | |
| Yu Kobayashi | Setsuna Sakurazaki | Negima!? | |
| Momoko Saito | Solty Revant | SoltyRei | |
| Kanako Sakai | Aka Onda | REC | |
| Minori Chihara | Yuki Nagato | The Melancholy of Haruhi Suzumiya | |
| Aya Hirano | Haruhi Suzumiya | The Melancholy of Haruhi Suzumiya | Won |
| Yui Makino | Misaki Nakahara | Welcome to the NHK! | |
| Ui Miyazaki | Iroha Miyamoto | Sumomomo Momomo | |
Best Music Performance
| Nominees | Songs | Anime | |
| Maaya Sakamoto | Kazemachi Jet, ending theme | Tsubasa Chronicle | |
| Tatsuhisa Suzuki | Heated Heart, opening theme | Kimi to Study | |
| Junichi Suwabe | Jet Drive, image song | Prince of Tennis | |
| Naozumi Takahashi | Ashita no Kioku, opening theme | Black Blood Brothers | |
| Kishō Taniyama | Infinite Love, opening theme | Koi suru Tenshi Angelique: Kokoro no Mezameru Toki | |
| Yukari Tamura | Ever-Never-Land, opening theme | Otogi-Jushi Akazukin | |
| Aya Hirano | Bouken Desho Desho?, opening theme | The Melancholy of Haruhi Suzumiya | |
| The SOS Brigade: Aya Hirano, Minori Chihara, Yuko Goto | Hare Hare Yukai, ending theme | The Melancholy of Haruhi Suzumiya | |
| Yui Horie | Hikari, opening theme | Inukami! | |
| Nana Mizuki | Justice to Believe, opening theme | Wild Arms V | Won |
Best Radio Personality
| Nominees | Radio Programs | Broadcasting Station | |
| Masumi Asano | A&G Super Radio Show - Anispa! | JOQR | Won |
| Rikiya Koyama | Utawarerumono Radio | Internet radio | |
| Takahiro Sakurai | Comchat Countdown | JOQR | |
| Kenichi Suzumura | Mitsuo Iwata & Kenichi Suzumura Sweet Ignition | OBC | |
| Yukari Tamura | Tamura Yukari no Itazura Kuro Usagi | JOQR | |
| Megumi Hayashibara | Hayashibara Megumi no Heartful Station | Radio Kansai | |
| Yui Horie | Horie Yui no Tenshi no Tamago | JOQR | |
| Nana Mizuki | Mizuki Nana no Smile Gang | JOQR | |
| Kouki Miyata | Tokyo Anime Center Radio | JOQR | |
| Ryōka Yuzuki | Utawarerumono Radio | Internet radio | |
