= Hare Hare Yukai =

Theme song from The Melancholy of Haruhi Suzumiya

Single by Haruhi Suzumiya (CV: Aya Hirano), Yuki Nagato (CV: Minori Chihara), and Mikuru Asahina (CV: Yuko Goto) (Note: "CV" is an abbreviation for "character voice.")
- A-side: "Hare Hare Yukai"
- B-side: "Welcome Unknown"
- Released: May 10, 2006
- Studio: Studio Magic Garden
- Genre: Anime song
- Label: Lantis
- Songwriters: Aki Hata; Tomokazu Tashiro
- Producer: Takahiro Ando

Haruhi Suzumiya (CV: Aya Hirano), Yuki Nagato (CV: Minori Chihara), and Mikuru Asahina (CV: Yuko Goto) singles chronology
"Hare Hare Yukai" (2006)	"Saikyō Pare Parade" (2006)

Music video
- "Hare Hare Yukai" on YouTube

"Hare Hare Yukai" (ハレ晴レユカイ; lit. "Sunny Sunny Delight") is the ending theme song to the 2006 anime adaptation of The Melancholy of Haruhi Suzumiya (the first book in the Haruhi Suzumiya light novel series by Nagaru Tanigawa and several other short stories). The song is performed by the characters of the series: Haruhi Suzumiya (voiced by Aya Hirano), Yuki Nagato (voiced by Minori Chihara), and Mikuru Asahina (voiced by Yuko Goto). It was released as a physical single of the same title on May 10, 2006 by Lantis with the B-side "Welcome Unknown", the ending theme song to the radio show The Melancholy of Haruhi Suzumiya: SOS Brigade Radio Division that was also performed by the same actresses. "Hare Hare Yukai" has also appeared as a song in The Melancholy of Haruhi Suzumiya Character Song CD series, of which each character has their own solo version of the song, performed by their respective voice actor in the series.

"Hare Hare Yukai" generated public interest for the dance sequence in the ending animation, which was produced by Kyoto Animation and directed by Yutaka Yamamoto. Known colloquially as the "Haruhi dance", many people replicated the choreography, and it was credited for starting the cover dance video genre on video-sharing websites, particularly Nico Nico Douga and YouTube. The popularity of the song also led to growing interest in the Japanese voice acting industry, a phenomenon known as the "voice actor boom." The single was certified Gold by the Recording Industry Association of Japan.

== Background and release ==
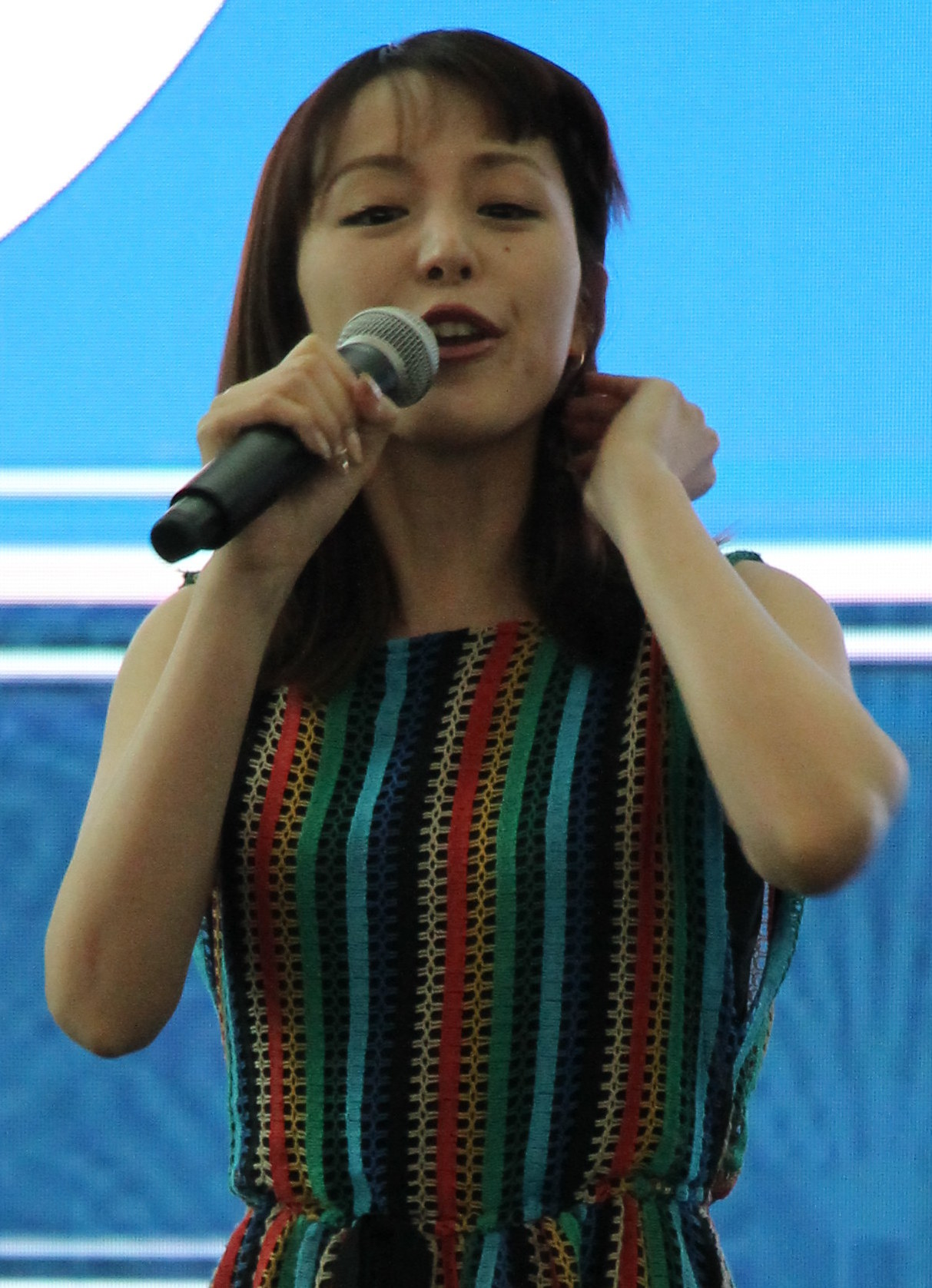
Aya Hirano (pictured in 2019), the voice actress of Haruhi Suzumiya, was one of the performers of the song.

"Hare Hare Yukai" is the ending theme song from the 2006 anime series The Melancholy of Haruhi Suzumiya (the animated adaptation of the first book and several short stories in the Haruhi Suzumiya series by Nagaru Tanigawa). It is composed by Tomokazu Tashiro and arranged by Takahiro Ando. The lyrics were written by Aki Hata. The vocals are performed by voice actresses Aya Hirano, Minori Chihara, and Yuko Goto, who portray the characters Haruhi Suzumiya, Yuki Nagato, and Mikuru Asahina respectively. "Hare Hare Yukai" was released as a physical single of the same title on May 10, 2006 by Lantis. The B-side of the single, "Welcome Unknown", also performed by the same actresses, was used as the ending theme song to The Melancholy of Haruhi Suzumiya: SOS Brigade Radio Division, a promotional radio show for The Melancholy of Haruhi Suzumiya.

During the broadcast of The Melancholy of Haruhi Suzumiya, Lantis released The Melancholy of Haruhi Suzumiya Character Song CD, a series of character song CDs, for each major character of the series: Haruhi Suzumiya, Yuki Nagato, Mikuru Asahina, Tsuruya (voiced by Yuki Matsuoka), Ryoko Asakura (voiced by Natsuko Kuwatani), Kyon's sister (voiced by Sayaka Aoki), Emiri Kimidori (voiced by Yuri Shiratori), Itsuki Koizumi (voiced by Daisuke Ono), and Kyon (voiced by Tomokazu Sugita). Each character CD included a solo version of "Hare Hare Yukai", some with different lyrics and arrangements.

== Video ==
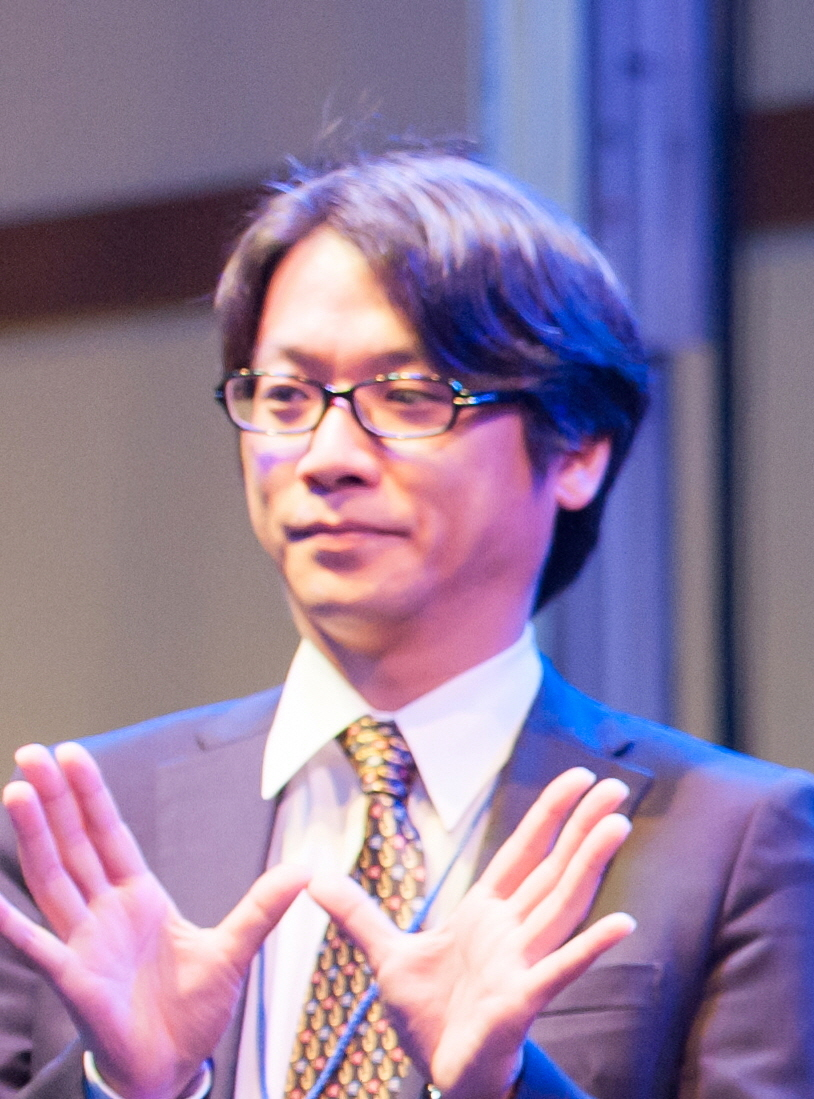
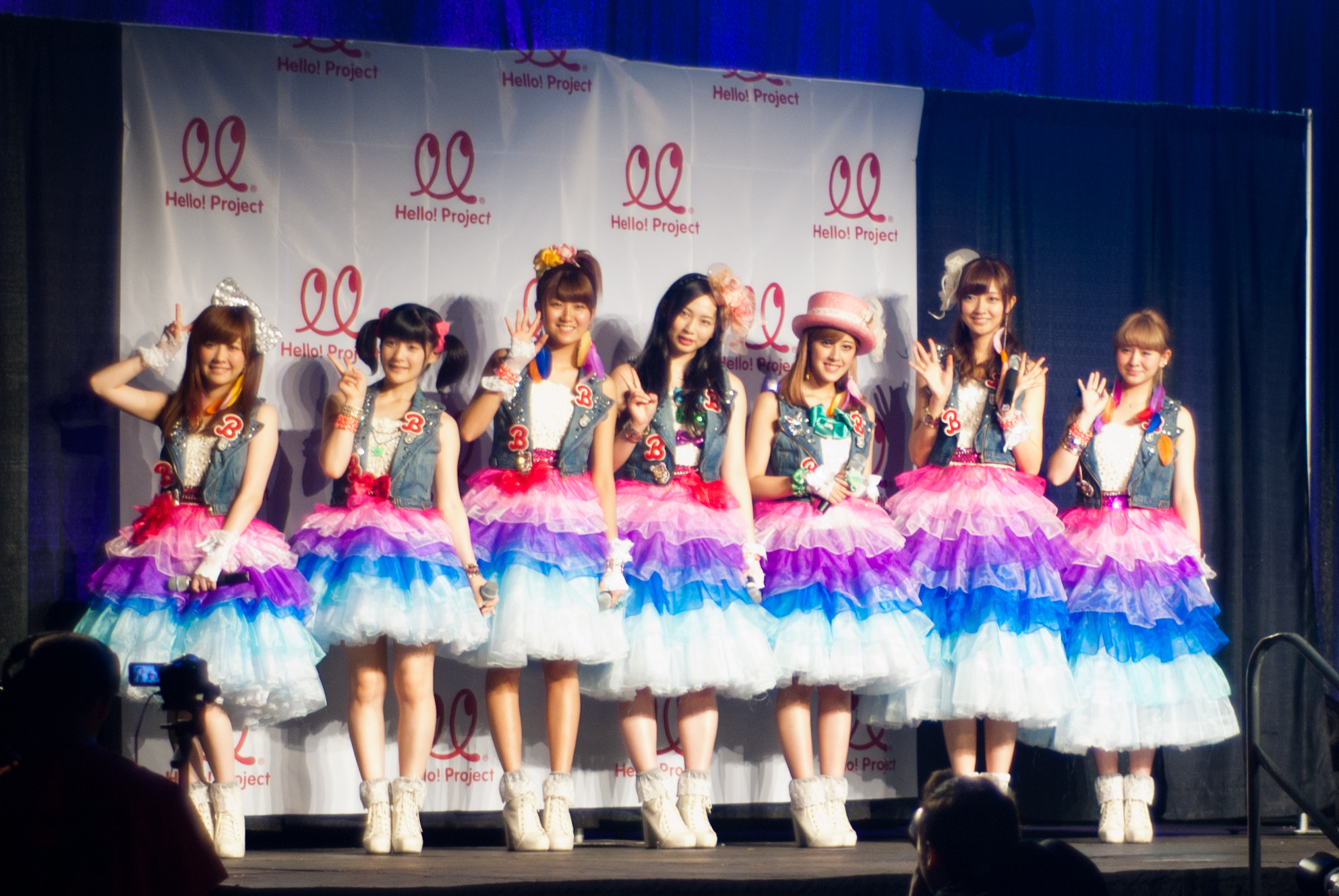
Yutaka Yamamoto (left, pictured in 2014) directed the animation to "Hare Hare Yukai", which featured choreography inspired by Berryz Kobo (right, pictured in 2012).

The ending animation of The Melancholy of Haruhi Suzumiya, created by Kyoto Animation, featured the main characters dancing, of which the choreography became colloquially known as the "Haruhi dance." The ending animation was directed and storyboarded by Yutaka Yamamoto. Yamamoto stated that he was inspired by the ending theme song "Fun Fun & Shout" from the 2002 OVA series Haré+Guu Deluxe, which also featured a dance sequence in its animation. Anthropologist Ryotaro Mihara observed that several parts of the choreography featured in the dance took inspiration from dance routines from the Japanese girl group Berryz Kobo. Shoko Ikeda, who worked on the ending animation, stated that she had no dance experience and that she saw a "glimpse of hell" as soon as the word "dance" was mentioned. She said that the only challenge she faced was having to watch idol music videos for reference.

On September 16, 2006, Kyoto Animation announced on their website that due to popular demand, they would release Yamamoto's storyboard of the full choreography on their website later in the month. Aya Hirano, Minori Chihara, and Yuko Goto, the voice actresses of Haruhi, Yuki, and Mikuru, revealed the choreography to the full version of "Hare Hare Yukai" to the public when they performed the song at the 2006 Animelo Summer Live. A fully animated choreography video featuring the TV size version of "Hare Hare Yukai" was included as a bonus extra on vol. 7 of the DVD home release of The Melancholy of Haruhi Suzumiya, which went on sale on January 26, 2007.

== Reception ==
The physical single of "Hare Hare Yukai" was sold out at stores in Akihabara, Japan on the first day of release, with Oricon reporting 34,881 copies sold on its first week. By July 2006, it sold over 100,000 copies and earned a Gold certification from the Recording Industry Association of Japan. In the same year, "Hare Hare Yukai" won the Theme Song Award at the 11th Animation Kobe Awards. At Anime Expo 2008, the Society for the Promotion of Japanese Animation awarded "Hare Hare Yukai" with Best Original Song. In 2019, "Hare Hare Yukai" won the Audience Choice Award at the Heisei Anisong Grand Prix for the decade of 2000 to 2009.

== Live performances ==
Hirano, Chihara, and Goto first performed "Hare Hare Yukai" at the 2006 Animelo Summer Live. On March 18, 2007, they performed the song again with Tomokazu Sugita (the voice actor of Kyon) and Daisuke Ono (the voice actor of Itsuki Koizumi) at The Extravagance of Haruhi Suzumiya, a live concert event for the cast of The Melancholy of Haruhi Suzumiya.

On August 25, 2017, Hirano, Chihara, and Goto appeared at the 2017 Animelo Summer Live as surprise guests to perform "Hare Hare Yukai" for the first time in 11 years. On December 13, 2017, Hirano performed "Hare Hare Yukai" with Sayaka Yamamoto from NMB48 and Sayuri Matsumura from Nogizaka46 for the 2017 FNS Music Festival Part 2. In 2018, Hirano, Chihara, and Goto performed "Hare Hare Yukai" at the MBS Anime Festival.

On June 23, 2019, Hirano, Chihara, Goto, Sugita, and Ono appeared at Lantis Festival 2019, a concert event celebrating the 20th anniversary of Lantis, under the name SOS Brigade. On November 12, 2023, Hirano, Chihara, Goto, Sugita, and Ono performed "Hare Hare Yukai" on day 2 of the Kyoto Animation Festival.

== Cultural impact ==
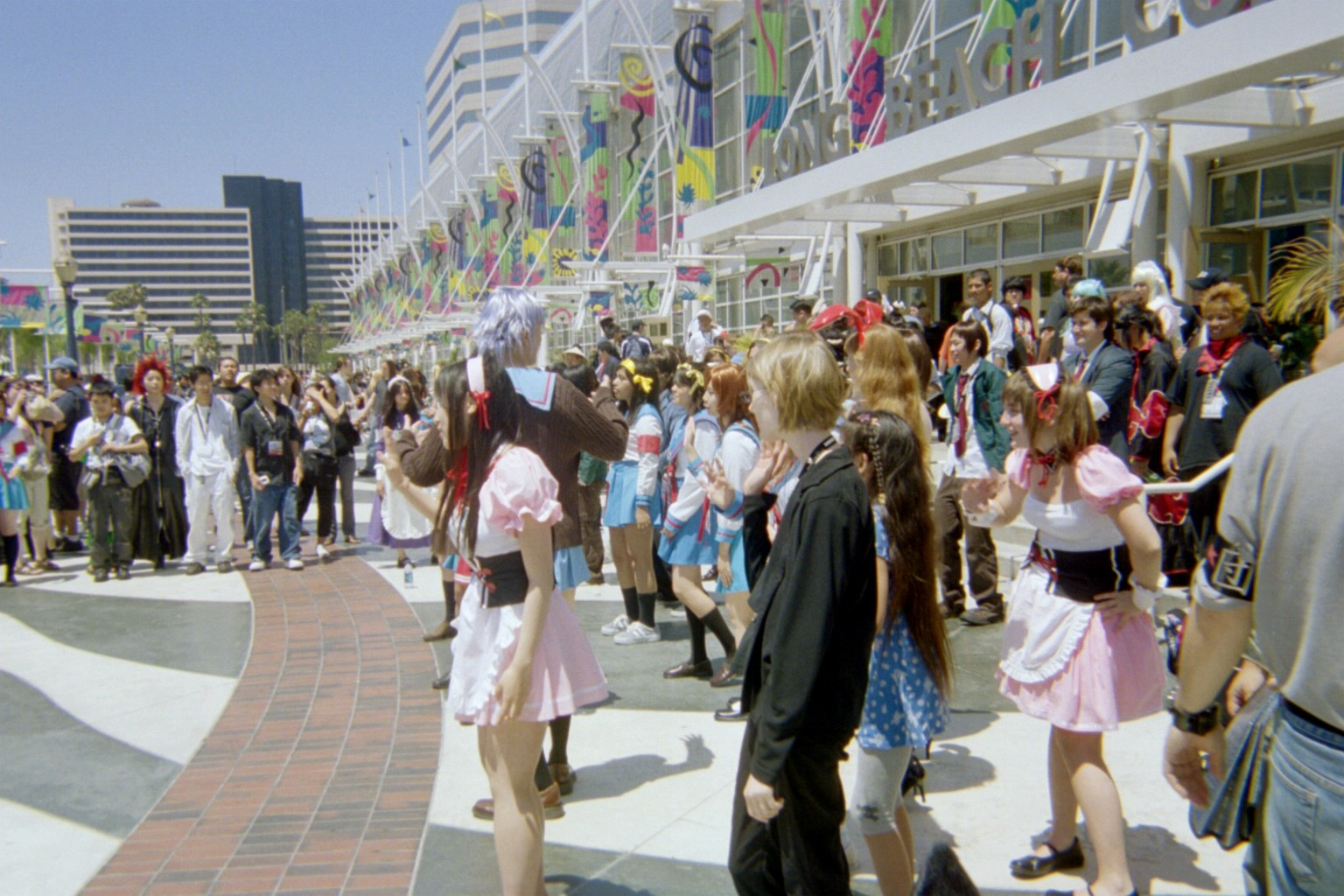
Fans performing the "Hare Hare Yukai" dance at Anime Expo 2007

Public interest and popularity of "Hare Hare Yukai" surrounded the dance choreography in the ending animation, which was replicated by fans. Fans notably campaigned in Akihabara, Japan, to get "Hare Hare Yukai" to top the Oricon Weekly Singles Chart. "Hare Hare Yukai" was credited for creating the cover dance video genre (known as "I tried dancing" (踊ってみた, odottemita)) and culture on video-sharing websites after many people recreated the dance choreography on Nico Nico Douga as early as March 2007. This later spread to YouTube and other video-sharing websites. "Hare Hare Yukai", along with Nana Mizuki's 2005 song "Eternal Blaze", was also credited for inspiring the "voice actor boom" in the mid-2000s, where the release of the songs led to more public interest in the Japanese voice acting industry. During a live event for Karaoke Sentai Seiyūger, a radio program featuring voice actors, voice actress Yu Serizawa named "Hare Hare Yukai" as one of the anime songs that "changed her life" and made her interested in pursuing voice acting. In 2007, a flash mob performed "Hare Hare Yukai" in Akihabara; however, it was stopped short by the police.

On April 24, 2020, Hirano posted a video of herself dancing and teaching the choreography of "Hare Hare Yukai" on her social media accounts to motivate others during the height of the COVID-19 pandemic, sparking the hashtag "#HareHareYukaiAtHomeWithAllYourMight" (#お家で全力ハレ晴レユカイ). This created a trend of cover dances of "Hare Hare Yukai" posted to the hashtag, participants of which included Tomokazu Sugita and Minoru Shiraishi (the voice actor of Taniguchi). This led "Hare Hare Yukai" to chart at no. 6 on the Billboard Japan Hot Animation in the same week.

"Hare Hare Yukai" has been featured in games such as Taiko no Tatsujin 9, Groove Coaster, Chunithm, Sound Voltex: Vivid Wave, and D4DJ Groovy Mix. "Hare Hare Yukai" has also been referenced in 2007 anime adaptation of Lucky Star, of which was also produced by Kyoto Animation and starred Hirano. The opening theme song and animation, "Motteke! Sailor Fuku", was created and marketed in a similar way to "Hare Hare Yukai" to match its success.

=== Cover versions ===
In 2012, the pop rock band Customize performed a cover of "Hare Hare Yukai" for their indies debut single. In 2018, a cover version of "Hare Hare Yukai" performed by Hello, Happy World! with Ran from Afterglow (voiced by Ayane Sakura) and Aya from Pastel Palettes (voiced by Ami Maeshima) was made playable on BanG Dream! Girls Band Party!. In 2021, a cover version of "Hare Hare Yukai" performed by Riamu Yumemi (voiced by Seena Hoshiki), Yukimi Sajo (voiced by Mina Nakazawa), and Nana Abe (voiced by Marie Miyake) was made playable on The Idolmaster Cinderella Girls: Starlight Stage. The song was used as the fourth ending theme for the 2024 anime series Alya Sometimes Hides Her Feelings in Russian covered by Sumire Uesaka.

== Track listing ==
No.	Title	Lyrics	Music	Arrangement	Length
1.	"Hare Hare Yukai (ハレ晴レユカイ)"	Aki Hata	Tomokazu Tashiro	Takahiro Ando	3:38
2.	"Welcome Unknown (うぇるかむUNKNOWN)"	Aki Hata	Morihiro Suzuki	Akio Kondo	3:24
3.	"Hare Hare Yukai (ハレ晴レユカイ)" (Instrumental)	—	Tomokazu Tashiro	Takahiro Ando	3:38
4.	"Welcome Unknown (うぇるかむUNKNOWN)" (Instrumental)	—	Morihiro Suzuki	Akio Kondo	3:24

== Chart performance ==
Chart	Peak position
Billboard Japan Hot Animation	6
Oricon Weekly Singles Chart	5
