= Nijū Mensō no Musume =

Television series

- Cover of the first volume of Nijū Mensō no Musume, as published by Media Factory

二十面相の娘
- Manga
- Written by: Shinji Ohara
- Published by: Media Factory
- Magazine: Comic Flapper
- Original run: 2003 – 2007
- Volumes: 8
- Manga

Nijū Mensō no Musume Utsushiyo no Yoru
- Written by: Shinji Ohara
- Published by: Media Factory
- Magazine: Comic Flapper
- Original run: October 5, 2007 – September 5, 2008
- Volumes: 2
- Anime television series

CHIKO, Heiress of the Phantom Thief
- Directed by: Nobuo Tomisawa
- Produced by: Kōji Yamamoto; Yūki Mori; Yoshihiro Iwasaki; Kyōtarō Kimura; Noritomo Yoneuchi; Osamu Taniguchi
- Written by: Michihiro Tsuchiya
- Music by: Kazunori Miyake
- Studio: Bones; Telecom Animation Film
- Original network: Fuji TV, KTV, THK
- Original run: April 12, 2008 – September 27, 2008
- Episodes: 22

Nijū Mensō no Musume (Japanese: 二十面相の娘; lit. "The Girl of Twenty Faces") is a Japanese manga series written and illustrated by manga author Shinji Ohara. The manga was serialized in the seinen manga magazine Comic Flapper between 2003 and 2007, but continued serialization in the same magazine with the title Nijū Mensō no Musume Utsushiyo no Yoru since October 5, 2007. An anime adaptation aired in Japan from April 12, 2008, to September 27, 2008, and was co-produced by Bones and Telecom Animation Film.

The characters in this series have been used with permission from surviving members of the family of Edogawa Rampo, the Japanese detective fiction author who had originally created the fictional characters of Kaijin Nijū Mensō and Kogoro Akechi.

The series is set in the Shōwa period, starting around 1953 in the anime.

== Story ==
Chizuko Mikamo is a young girl living with her aunt and uncle after her parents died. She behaves coldly toward them, despite their efforts to make her happy, because she knows that they are trying to slowly poison her so that they can take her inheritance for themselves. Because of her intelligence and knowledge gained from reading detective novels, she works to avoid eating the food her aunt prepares, but it is impossible to avoid all together and she still takes in enough to cause her to collapse. Her butler is revealed to actually be the world-famous thief Twenty Faces, who was there to steal Chizuko's rightful inheritance, a family heirloom gem known as the Anastasia Ruby. When he realizes just what Chizuko's been going through, however, he asks her if she wants to come with him and his band on their travels around the world. She agrees and Twenty Faces takes her back with him to join his gang, who affectionately shorten her name to Chiko. Two years pass and Chiko is now a strong thief, having learned the tricks of the trade from Twenty Faces and the members of his band. Now, with Twenty Faces and the rest of the band as her family, she has found a home at last.

After living with the band for two years, Chiko becomes a skilled thief and thinks of Twenty Faces as her father. But a sudden train accident caused by Tiger, Twenty Faces' strongest enemy, kills most of the band and seems to have killed Twenty Faces himself. By chance a detective who works for her aunt finds her and, after being "rescued" two years after Twenty Faces "kidnapped" her, Chiko is forced to return to her aunt's house, where she becomes depressed and refuses to talk because of the shock of Twenty Faces' death. But when a mysterious detective appears and she learns that there is a possibility that he may still be alive somewhere, Chiko becomes more lively and works, with the help of a few new friends, to find him by following the clues that he seems to have left behind, beginning with something that is rightfully hers and had been left in his care: the Anastasia Ruby. Now, Chiko must dodge her aunt's attempts to murder her and unravel the mysteries Twenty Faces left for her to solve, or so it seems. There are many steps in her long journey, some of which awaken painful memories and others that lead her to discover more about the past of the man behind Twenty Faces and herself.

== Characters ==
=== Main characters ===
Chizuko Mikamo (美甘千津子, Mikamo Chizuko) aka Chiko (チコ)

Voiced by: Aya Hirano
First introduced as the 11-year-old heiress to the Anastasia Ruby, Chiko lived with her aunt and uncle after her parents died. However, she acted coldly towards her relatives because she knew they were slowly poisoning her in order to inherit her parents' fortune. Luckily, she was saved by Nijū-Mensō, who gave her the choice to leave with him, when he had coincidentally been there to steal the Anastasia Ruby. She admires Nijū-Mensō a great deal, and he becomes a very important role model for her. Chiko learns many tricks from everyone on the team, and has the making to become a great thief. One of her aliases is Lilly, the high rope walker. At the age of thirteen, Chiko appears to be the last survivor of the Phantom Thief team aside from the young knife thrower, Ken. The assumption comes into question when the detective Akechi visits Chiko's house and presents the Anastasia Ruby to Chiko, which Nijū-Mensō had last held in safe keeping. After hearing that Nijū-Mensō may still be alive, Chiko vows to find him by becoming a detective herself. Her affection toward Nijū-Mensō led her to call him "Oji-san" (lit. uncle) rather than Boss like the rest of the gang.

Twenty Faces (二十面相, Nijū-Mensō)

Voiced by: Yuya Uchida
A mysterious man that is the main face behind the famous thief known as Nijū-Mensō. He is the chief of the team and the mastermind behind everything. Not much is known about his past, but it can be inferred that he was somehow deeply affected by the Great War; he mentions having lost all hope in the world during that period and a knowledge that there are still evildoers at large despite the war being over. Thus, he is greatly against killing, and makes sure that his team does not kill anyone unless there is no other option. Though he is a thief, he appears to have a high moral code and a very kind and understanding nature. He teaches Chiko and the rest of his team that the most important abilities one must have in life are to be able to listen, observe one's surroundings, and to be able to think for one's self. Most of the team calls him Boss, but Chiko prefers to refer to him as Oji-san, lit. Uncle. Before the train incident, he seemed to be indirectly training Chiko to be his heir, since she is one of the most clever, eager, and willing members of the team. This way, she would be able to continue where he left off in the case of his death. He appeared to have disappeared the night of the train incident when the car he was on exploded, but returned later when Chiko was in terrible danger, disguised at first as Akechi. He disappears again soon after, saying that he had recently discovered that the Great War was still ongoing beneath the surface. It is revealed that during the Great War, he had been a researcher whose work could revolutionize warfare with his discovery of how to induce the fourth state of water. However, when he realized how dangerous his discovery would be, he destroyed the laboratory before abandoning his colleagues, who would pursue him to learn the information that he never disclosed, and made it his life's mission to try to stop another great war from happening.

=== Supporting characters ===
Shunka Koito (小糸春華, Koito Shunka)

Voiced by: Rina Satou
Shunka is the granddaughter of the founder of Chiko's school. She uses this to her advantage amongst her peers, so her initial reaction to Chiko's cleverness is hostility. She changes her tune, however, after finding out how much "fun" it is to be around Chiko and her Nijū-Mensō-related adventures. Her goal is to have as much fun as possible until she turns 16 and is of age for her arranged marriage. She often doesn't seem to care about how much trouble she causes, so long as she has fun. This means she has a habit of adding oil to the fire in dangerous situations because it would be more entertaining that way. In the eleventh episode of the anime it is revealed that Shunka had a twin sister who drowned at age 5. Because she was unable to do anything to help, Shunka blames herself for her sister's death.

Tome (トメ)

Voiced by: Satomi Arai
Chiko's new maid, after the first turned out to be Nijū-Mensō, and as of late her caretaker. She cares very deeply for Chiko, and did her best to revive her spirits after she came back refusing to speak or eat after the train explosion. Thanks to Tome's constant attempts to be accommodating, Chiko is able to avoid eating her aunt's poisoned meals. At first, Chiko was dispirited and ignored Tome's attempts to cheer her up, but after meeting Akechi she livened up and accepted Tome's hospitality. When Tome learns that Chiko's aunt has been poisoning Chiko's meals, Tome manages to successfully blackmail and deceive Chiko's aunt into allowing them to live in their own separate home. Tome is devoted to Chiko and determined to protect Chiko as best she can until Chiko can assume her rightful fortune.

Ken (ケン)

Voiced by: Masaya Matsukaze
A teenager who is an expert in knife throwing. During his stay with Nijū-Mensō, his role during a job was usually more in the execution stage than the planning or preparation stage. He was the one who originally shortened "Chizuko" to "Chiko", a nickname which Chiko quickly picked up on. Chiko calls him Ken-nii-chan (lit. older brother Ken) as he appeared to be the youngest member of the band save Chiko, and the two were very close. He was the one who taught her to throw knives. He lost the vision in his left eye after being attacked by Tiger. After the train incident he went off on his own after waiting several days for Nijū-Mensō to come back for him. Although he was once cheerful, he appears to harbor bitter feelings toward Nijū-Mensō for abandoning him and toward Chiko for having companions who alleviated the loss of Nijū-Mensō. Later, however, it is revealed that he still has a soft spot for Chiko and helps her and the passengers on a crashing airship escape, soon after Nijū-Mensō disappeared a second time.

Detective Akine (空根太作, Akine-tasaku)

Voiced by: Masanori Takeda
A detective hired by Chizuko's aunt and uncle to look for her when she is taken by Nijū-Mensō, chosen specifically because Chiko's aunt knew that he would be too incompetent to find Chiko. He travels around on the money they give him and makes up reports that he is getting closer to finding her, though is aware that Chiko's aunt does not care if Chiko is found or not. By chance, he is on the train Nijū-Mensō's group is travelling on during Tiger's attack and survives to find a catatonic Chiko. He returns her to her aunt and continues to take money from them from the publicity of Chiko's return. The White Haired Devil uses him to corner Chiko by forcing him to recall his deepest regret – after the war, he lost his younger sister Chieko and never found her again, remaining haunted by the memory. Nijū-Mensō frees him from the Devil's control and Akine helps rescue Tome and Shunka, who were captured by the Devil. When Chiko's aunt tries to frame him for a failed murder attempt on Chiko, Akine chooses to leave her service and protect Chiko, whom he has come to see as a reflection of his lost younger sister.

Akechi (明智)

Voiced by: Kenji Hamada
A detective who shows interest as well as familiarity with Nijū-Mensō's mode of operation and history. He first approaches Chiko when she is returned to her aunt after several years with Nijū-Mensō and suggests that Nijū-Mensō is alive. After Akechi returns the Anastasia Ruby, previously held by Nijū-Mensō for safekeeping, to Chiko, she accepts Akechi's challenge to see which of the two will find Nijū-Mensō first and he recognizes Chiko as a detective by taking up the endeavour. Nijū-Mensō briefly impersonates Akechi to save Chiko from the White Haired Devil, though the real Akechi appears to afterward to chase after Nijū-Mensō when Chiko is taken by the Devil. As a detective, he is known and respected by the city police and is able to gather information on Nijū-Mensō, which he shares with Chiko. He is the first to suspect Nijū-Mensō's prior history as scientist attempting to create the "fourth state of water" will have dangerous consequences on Tokyo, but upon finding Nijū-Mensō, Akechi allows him to leave and complete his mission and not arrest Nijū-Mensō for the time being.

Nozomi Kayama (香山望, Kayama Nozomi)

Voiced by: Miyuki Sawashiro
A rogue scientist from a pharmaceutical company who used military research originally conducted by Nijū Mensō to create super soldiers akin to "Human Tanks". She and her partner, Takashi Tsuya, experimented on themselves and enhanced their bodies, but when they found they could not reach the intended results of the research, they sought to find a cure by approaching Chiko, believing that the legacy Nijū Mensō left to her would be the research they needed. Dr. Tsuya dies when his body loses control from the experiments while Dr. Kayama escapes, leaving Chiko a warning that she will be approached by many people seeking the legacy of Nijū Mensō. Dr. Kayama continues to search for a cure for her condition, eventually saving Ken from Kakihara's agents, recognizing that they are more advanced products of research by Seiji Tamiya to create human tanks, and works with Ken to defeat them.

Sayuri (サユリ)

Voiced by: Miyuki Kawashou
A classmate of Chiko from school.

Mika (ミカ)

Voiced by: Yuki Kodaira
A classmate of Chiko from school.

=== Nijū Mensō's Thieves ===
Skipper (船長, Senchou)

Voiced by: Kōtarō Nakamura
One of the most trusted and senior members of Nijū Mensō's group, referred to as "Skipper". He is initially reluctant to allow her to participate in their activities because he feels that she is still a child and should be leading a more normal life. As a result, he dislikes how the other thieves train Chiko to fight and live like a thief, but comes to accept her and her abilities when she asks to take part in a mission when Ken cannot. He dies during Tiger's attack on the train after the gang steals the Clock of the Magi while defending Chiko from one of Tiger's men. During the war, Skipper was a sergeant-major in the army, but as a colleague of Nijū Mensō, he escaped with Nijū Mensō when the latter destroyed the laboratory where he worked and became a fugitive.

Hans (ハンス)

Voiced by: Susumu Chiba
A member of Nijū Mensō's group, a young man who readily accepts Chiko as one of their own. A native of Germany, he teaches and practices speaking German with Chiko. Because of his somewhat effemininate features, he is asked to impersonate a woman when the group poses as a travelling circus. He is killed during Tiger's attack on the train. Hans originally joined Nijū Mensō and Skipper when they were stealing from a casino some time after Japan's surrender.

Muta (ムタ)

Voiced by: Kenta Miyake
A member of Nijū Mensō's group, an older man who appears to disapprove of Chiko joining Nijū Mensō's group because she is still a child and a possible liability. However, Chiko's sincerity, resourcefulness, and ability to adapt and learn the life of the thieves eventually gains his open acceptance of her. Muta teaches her to fight, reminding her not to let her guard down in a fight, take advantage of openings (particularly of weaknesses, such as striking a man's groin), and to use an opponent's weight and strength to throw them rather than her own. He is severely wounded during Tiger's attack on the train, but manages to survive the initial attack and escape with Ken and Skipper. However, he sacrifices himself to save Chiko from being shot.

=== Antagonists ===
Yoshie Mikamo (美甘淑恵, Mikamo Yoshie)

Voiced by: Yumi Touma
Chizuko's aunt is actually the wife of Shoji Mikamo, the younger brother of Chiko's father, so she and Chiko are not related by blood. She is responsible for slowly poisoning Chiko with food containing lead in order to take control of Chiko's fortune. While her husband initially supported her plan, she poisons him while Chiko is with Nijū Mensō's group and he dies of lead poisoning. When Chiko returns, she continues to try to eliminate her niece in various ways, though Chiko always manages to elude her. When Tome learns the truth behind her actions, Tome successfully blackmails her into giving Tome full guardianship of Chiko and a mansion for them to live in. Chiko's aunt gives up trying to kill her niece after Akine threatens to reveal the truth to the media following a failed assassination attempt on Chiko; when she asks if Chiko still hates her, Akine replies only that Chiko likely pities her aunt. Yoshie is aided by a lawyer named Kurosaki in her attempt to take Chiko's fortune.

Shoji Mikamo (美甘正次, Mikamo Shoji)

Voiced by: Toshimitsu Oda
Chizuko's uncle, the younger brother of Chiko's father. He and his wife put on the pretense of caring for Chiko in place of her deceased parents, but are actually after Chiko's fortune instead. He goes along with his wife's plan to slowly poison his niece and is worried about the consequences of Chiko leaving with Nijū Mensō. However, he realizes too late that his wife intends to take the entire Mikamo fortune for herself and he dies of lead poisoning.

Tiger (虎, Tora)

Voiced by: Rintaro Nishi
A violent thief who considers himself a superior rival to Nijū Mensō and attacks him after Nijū Mensō rescues Chiko from her family. He is armed with a set of sharp claws. Tiger is motivated by greed and destruction, and eventually plans a successfully attack on Nijū Mensō's group when they are celebrating the theft of the Clock of the Magi on a train. Tiger's group kills off the entire gang of thieves, leaving only Chiko and Ken as survivors. While Tiger is eventually defeated and left to die by Nijū Mensō, Tiger decides to trigger an explosion that destroys the train along with himself in order to kill Nijū Mensō.

Seiji Tamiya (田宮清次, Tamiya Seiji) aka White Haired Devil (白髪の魔人)

Voiced by: Atsuko Tanaka
A mysterious white haired woman who possesses one of a pair of pendants containing a rare jewel that glows even in darkness and whose body is made entirely of artificial parts. She approaches Chiko with the intent to drag her into despair and feels that Chiko will never understand what it means to be close to Nijū Mensō. She hypnotises Shunka, Tome, and Akine to turn against and kill Chiko; failing that, she kidnaps Tome and uses her as bait to lure and fight Chiko. Eventually, it is revealed that she was Nijū Mensō's lover when they were scientists working on revolutionary research before the war. Her specialty was creating cybernetics and enhancements for the body and is devastated when Nijū Mensō destroys the lab without explanation, especially after she uses herself as a subject of her research. She continued to seek out Nijū Mensō and destroy those close to him, but when he accepts her again, her body expires, her will to live expended after finally finding Nijū Mensō again.

Kohei Kakihara (柿島耕平, Kakihara Kohei)

Voiced by: Hochu Otsuka
A research professor who was Nijū Mensō's supervisor in Nijū Mensō's days as a scientist. Though he warns Chiko against trusting Nijū Mensō, he is actually obsessed with obtaining Nijū Mensō's legacy as a researcher and reaching the "fourth state of water". He does not care for the consequences and believes that the dangerous power of the fourth state of water will change the world, no matter how destructive it is. He also used Seiji Tamiya's research to create enhanced cybernetic bodies for himself and others, eventually changing his body in the image of Nijū Mensō. Kakihara was the original Nijū Mensō, but Nijū Mensō's thefts began occurring at the same time and the name became attached to the young scientist while Kakihara was forgotten. He is without morals and seeks only to complete the research Nijū Mensō conducted before the war, believing the research was selfishly kept from him, and had killed many people over the years to obtain it.

Kurosaki (黒崎)

Voiced by: Tokuyoshi Kawashima
Yoshie's lawyer who works undercover as an agent to help the latter steal Chiko's fortune.

== Episodes ==
Nijū Mensō no Musume contains 22 episodes. The episodes are directed by Nobuo Tomizawa and composed by Rikei Tsuchiya.

== Theme songs ==
Opening theme

1. "Kasumi [Mist]" (霞)
  - Performance: 369 miroku
  - Lyrics: 369, Ryoji
  - Composition: 369, tasuku
  - Arrangement: tasuku

Ending theme

1. "Unnamed World"
  - Performance: Aya Hirano
  - Lyrics: Aki Hata
  - composition: Katsuhiko Kurosu
  - Arrangement: nishi-ken
