= Kawa no Hikari =

2007 Japanese novel

- First edition novel cover, released July 2007

川の光
- Genre: Adventure
- Novel
- Written by: Hisaki Matsuura
- Illustrated by: Kazuko Shimazu
- Published by: Chuokoron-Shinsha
- Published: July 25, 2007
- Anime television film
- Directed by: Tetsuo Hirakawa
- Music by: Kurihara Masami
- Studio: Gallop
- Original network: NHK General TV
- Released: June 20, 2009
- Runtime: 75 minutes

Kawa no Hikari (川の光; lit. 'Light of the River') is a 2007 Japanese children's adventure novel written by Hisaki Matsuura and featuring illustrations by Kazuko Shimazu. It was originally serialized in the newspaper Yomiuri Shimbun between July 25, 2006, and April 23, 2007, before being released in bound format by publisher Chuokoron-Shinsha exactly one year after its periodical debut. The book was later adapted into an animated TV special by Studio Gallop, which aired on NHK General TV on June 20, 2009, as part of the network's "Save the Future" lineup, along with other environmentally-conscious programming.

The story takes place in modern Japan, and centers on a group of three rats, a father and two young sons, who must find their way back to their river home after being displaced by human construction workers.

== Synopsis ==
A family of three rats, brothers Tata and Chichi, and their father, referred to only as "Dad", live in a tree trunk beside a river just outside Tokyo, just as their ancestors had for generations. However, sudden construction work by humans causes their home to be blocked off, forcing them to search for a new place to live upstream. Time becomes a factor as winter is fast approaching, leading the trio to venture in and around the dangerous city, encountering allies and enemies of all shapes and sizes.

== Characters ==
The story primarily focuses on a family of three black rats:

- Tata (タータ, Tāta): The older and more level-headed of the two brothers. He is voiced by Fumiko Orikasa in the television film.
- Chichi (チッチ, Chitchi): The younger and more energetic of the two brothers. Unlike his sibling and father, he has white fur instead of brown, a potential liability for a prey species, which he must learn to deal with and accept. He is voiced by Tomoko Kaneda in the television film.
- Dad (お父さん, Otōsan): Father of the two boys whose wife died shortly after Chichi was born. Highly protective and knowledgeable, he leads the group through both wilderness and urban sprawl. He is voiced by Kōichi Yamadera in the television film.

Other characters include characters of various species:

- Tammy (タミー, Tamī): A playful female Golden Retriever who lives with her masters near the same riverbank as the rats, and rescues Chichi after he gets caught in a river current on a water bottle. She is voiced by Aya Hirano in the television film.
- Glen (グレン, Guren): A kind-hearted male brown rat who lives alone in a city library. He helps Dad and his children escape a gang of his territorial kin, who he no longer wants any part of. He is voiced by Akio Ōtsuka in the television film.
- Blue (ブルー, Burū): A female Russian Blue cat who "only eats fish" and lives in a quiet house with an old woman. She helps nurse the rats back to health after they nearly drown in a sewer pipe, and helps Chichi take pride in his different fur color. She is voiced by Atsuko Tanaka in the television special.
- Sparrow family (スズメ一家, Suzume-ikka): A family of Eurasian tree sparrows the rats encounter in a park. They consist of a father (voiced by Nobuo Harada), mother (voiced by Norika Fujiwara) and a young son (voiced by Akiko Suzuki) who has trouble learning to fly.
- Mole family (モグラ一家, Mogura-ikka): A family of moles who live in the same park as the sparrows. They include an unnamed mother and her children Mora (モラ), Mori (モリ), Moru (モル), More (モレ), and Moro (モロ). The moles were not featured in the animated adaptation.
- Brown rats (ドブネズミ, Dobunezumi): A gang of brown rats led by Boss Nezumi (ボスネズミ), who is said to be about the size of a rabbit with dark fur. They include Drum (ドラム, Doramu), Ganz (ガンツ, Gantsu), and Sara (サラ), and were not featured in the animated adaptation.

== Animated adaptation ==
In March 2009, voice actress Aya Hirano revealed on her blog that she would be voicing the character Tammy in an animated adaptation of the 2007 novel. The special was directed by Tetsuo Hirakawa, and features animation by Studio Gallop, as well as the theme song "I'm Here With You" written and performed by Yusa Mimori. On June 20, the film was aired for the first time on NHK General TV as part of their "Save the Future" lineup, part of their Chikyū ECO 2009 ("Earth Ecology 2009") campaign to promote environmental awareness. It was re-broadcast on NHK on December 20, 2009, and released on region 2 DVD in Japan on June 25, 2010.

== Reception ==
The Kawa no Hikari TV special was awarded first place for "Best Animated Feature" from both children's and adult's juries at the 27th annual Chicago International Children's Film Festival in 2010. It would also be named one of four Grand Prix Best of Festival winners, and receive a first-place "Golden Camera Award" in the field of animation from the US International Film & Video Festival, also in 2010. That same year, the special would receive a Silver Award for Best Foreign Animation at the 16th annual Shanghai Television Festival, as well as a Children Earth Vision Award from the Earth Vision Tokyo Environmental Film Festival.

== Sequels ==
To date, two follow-up novels have been released by original author Hisaki Matsuura. The first, Kawa no Hikari Gaiden (川の光 外伝, The River's Light Gaiden), is a side-story released on June 25, 2012, and tells the tale of a group of animals gathering in the forest at night. A direct sequel to the original, Kawa no Hikari 2: Tammy wo Sukue! (川の光2 タミーを救え！, The River's Light 2: Rescue Tammy!), released February 25, 2014, follows the further adventures of Tata and Chichi as they venture into the city to rescue their canine friend Tammy from kidnappers.
