= Aya Hirano =

Japanese voice actress and singer (born 1987)

- 平野 綾
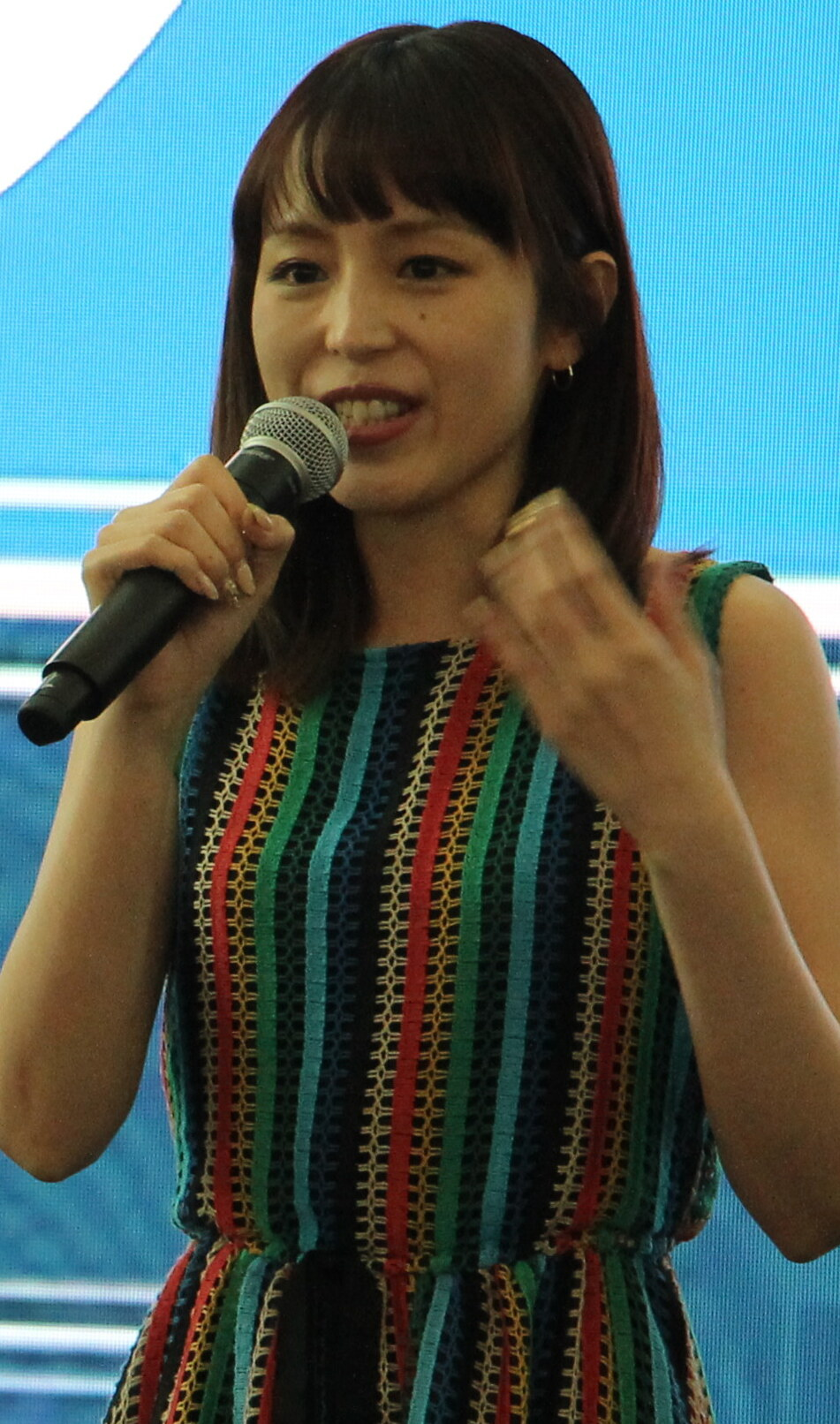
- Hirano at FanimeCon 2019
- Born: October 8, 1987 (age 39); Nagoya, Aichi Prefecture, Japan
- Occupations: Actress; singer
- Years active: 1998–present
- Notable work: The Melancholy of Haruhi Suzumiya as Haruhi Suzumiya; Death Note as Misa Amane; Lucky Star as Konata Izumi; Fairy Tail as Lucy Heartfilia
- Spouse: Masashi Taniguchi (m. 2024; div. 2025)
- Musical career
- Genres: J-pop; anime song
- Years active: 2006–present
- Labels: Lantis; Universal Music
- Website: ayahirano.jp

Aya Hirano (平野 綾, Hirano Aya; born October 8, 1987) is a Japanese actress and singer. Beginning in the entertainment industry as a child actor in television commercials, she appeared in her first voice acting role in the anime television series Angel Tales (2001).

In 2006, Hirano became known for her role as the title character in the Haruhi Suzumiya franchise, winning the Voice Acting Award at the 2007 Tokyo Anime Awards, the Best Newcomer Award at the 1st Seiyu Awards in 2007, and the Best Lead Actress award at the 2nd Seiyu Awards in 2008. She also provided the voice of Misa Amane in Death Note, Konata Izumi in Lucky Star, and Lucy Heartfilia in Fairy Tail. In 2010, Hirano began transitioning her acting career to television and stage plays, starring in Konna no Idol Janain!? (2012) and Muse no Kagami (2012).

In the late 2000s and early 2010s, Hirano was regarded as an idol voice actor and is notable for being a voice actor who was able to cross over to mainstream entertainment. Along with voice acting, Hirano currently releases music through Universal Sigma. She released her first single "Breakthrough" in 2006, and she released her first album Riot Girl in 2008.

== Early life ==
Hirano was born in Nagoya on October 8, 1987. From the ages of two until three Hirano lived in New York City, United States due to her father's job, and she became interested in acting after watching the 1990 Broadway production of Peter Pan.

== Career ==
=== Acting career ===
In 1998, Hirano joined the Tokyo Child Theatrical Group division of the Space Craft Group company. After starting her acting career, Hirano began to appear in commercials and received her first role as a voice actress at 14 years old in the 2001 anime series Angel Tales. In 2002, when she was 15, she voiced co-lead character Lumiere in Kiddy Grade.

After graduating from high school, Hirano began seriously pursuing her voice acting and solo singing career. Her big break came in 2006, when she was cast as the voice of Haruhi Suzumiya, the title character and heroine of the anime series The Melancholy of Haruhi Suzumiya. The series' public success boosted her popularity and career in Japan. Hirano soon became one of the first voice actors who crossed over into mainstream media, as well as one of the first well-known idol voice actors. This success was followed by her voicing Reira Serizawa in Nana and Misa Amane in Death Note. At the first Seiyu Awards, she won "Best Newcomer (female)", for her role as Haruhi Suzumiya; the same role also won her a nomination as "Best Main Character (female)". At the same awards, she was also nominated for "Best Supporting Character (female)", and earned two nominations for "Best Single" (one of which was for a solo, "Bōken Desho Desho?"; the other was a group nomination for the single "Hare Hare Yukai"). She also won in the Voice Acting category at the 2007 Tokyo Anime Awards for her role as the lead character in The Melancholy of Haruhi Suzumiya.

Hirano performed at the Animelo Summer Live concerts between 2006 and 2008, as well as the Suzumiya Haruhi no Gekisō concert on March 18, 2007. She was a guest at Anime Expo 2007, along with other cast members from The Melancholy of Haruhi Suzumiya, Minori Chihara and Yūko Gotō. In 2007, she continued to enjoy great success in her career, landing the role of Konata Izumi in the anime version of Lucky Star. In 2008, at the second Seiyu Awards, she won for Best Lead Actress, and also for Best Singing along with cast members of Lucky Star for the series' opening theme "Motteke! Sailor Fuku".

In April 2011, Hirano announced that she had been prohibited from taking on new voice acting roles since the previous year. She still continued voicing characters for anime that received additional seasons or extended runs. Citing a need for a new agency that was more ideal for her career wishes, she announced on August 12, 2011, that she had left Space Craft Entertainment. On August 21, Hirano moved to the voice acting agency Grick. Days later, on August 27, she posted a message on her Twitter account, confirming that she had resumed new voice acting roles in anime.

=== Music career ===
Hirano's music career began as part of the band SpringS, which was active from 2002 to 2003. She then released two character image songs in 2005: "Kimi Kara Onegai My Saint" (キミからお願い★my saint), which was used as an ending theme to the original video animation Itsudatte My Santa!, and "Futari no Imi" (二人の意味), which was an image song for her character Mamori Anezaki in the anime series Eyeshield 21.

Hirano's first solo single under the record label Lantis was "Breakthrough", which was released on March 8, 2006; the title track was used as the opening theme of the visual novel Finalist. Her next single was "Bōken Desho Desho?" (冒険でしょでしょ?, It's an Adventure, Right Right?), which was released on April 26, 2006; the title track is used as the opening theme of The Melancholy of Haruhi Suzumiya. The CD sold out in Japan the very day it was released. This was followed by the release of an image song single for her character Haruhi Suzumiya on July 5, 2006, which contained the songs "Parallel Days" (パラレル Days) and "SOS nara Daijōbu" (SOS ならだいじょーぶ). Her third single "Ashita no Prism" (明日のプリズム) was released on September 6, 2006.

Hirano released her fourth single "Love Gun" on October 10, 2007. This was followed by her fifth single "Neophilia" which was released on November 7, 2007, and her sixth single "MonStAR" which was released on December 5, 2007.

Hirano released her seventh single "Unnamed World" on April 23, 2008; the title track was used as the ending theme to the anime series Nijū Mensō no Musume. This was followed by the release of her first solo album Riot Girl on July 16, 2008. She then released the song "Namida" (涙 NAMIDA ナミダ) on October 8, 2008, which was used as the ending theme to the anime series Hyakko.

Hirano released her eighth single "Set me free / Sing a song!" on April 29, 2009. She then released her ninth single "Super Driver" on July 22, 2009; the title track is used as the opening theme of the second season of The Melancholy of Haruhi Suzumiya. Her second album Speed Star (スピード☆スター) was released on November 18, 2009. Her tenth single "Hysteric Barbie" was released on June 23, 2010. To promote the single, she created a Twitter account which was originally intended to be only used for one day; however, she would continue to use the account after the promotion had ended.

In May 2011, Hirano released a compilation album titled Aya Museum. Later that month, she announced via Twitter that she was no longer performing music for Lantis and had discontinued her music career until further notice. On August 2, 2011, Japanese magazine Bubka confirmed that she was dismissed by Lantis due to her sleeping with several band members. She then returned to music in 2012 and was signed to the record label Universal Sigma. Her first release on the label was the mini album Fragments on May 23, 2012. This was followed by the song "Zutto Kitto" (ずっと きっと) which was released on August 15, 2012; the title track is used as the ending theme to the anime film Fairy Tail the Movie: Phoenix Priestess.

In 2013, Hirano released two singles: "TOxxxIC" which was released on February 20, and "Promise" which was released on October 9; "Promise" was used as an insert song in the documentary film Kitakitsune Monogatari: Ashita e. She released her fourth album Vivid on February 19, 2014.

In 2018, Hirano performed the song "Pride", which was used as a character song to the mobile game Granblue Fantasy.

On April 24, 2020, Hirano posted a video of herself dancing and teaching the choreography of "Hare Hare Yukai" on her social media accounts to motivate others during the height of the COVID-19 pandemic, sparking the hashtag "#HareHareYukaiAtHomeWithAllYourMight" (#お家で全力ハレ晴レユカイ). This created a trend of cover dances of "Hare Hare Yukai" posted to the hashtag, participants of which included Tomokazu Sugita (the voice actor of Kyon) and Minoru Shiraishi (the voice actor of Taniguchi). This led "Hare Hare Yukai" to chart at no. 6 on the Billboard Japan Hot Animation in the same week.

On May 10, 2025, she released "Evolutions", a single under the Lantis label.

== Personal life ==
In November 2010, Hirano posted a message on her Twitter account that she has had a pituitary gland tumor since junior high school. While not malignant, the tumor exerts pressure on certain motor functions, resulting in temporary memory loss, loss of vision and slurring of speech. She decided against elective surgery because the surgery would alter her nasal cavity and permanently modify her voice. In 2016, after a stint in the musical The Mystery of Edwin Drood in Tokyo, Hirano spent four months studying English and voice in New York.

On January 3, 2024, she announced her marriage to actor Masashi Taniguchi. On September 11 of the same year, Bungeishunjū published a report of an alleged domestic violence against Hirano. She responded to the report on social media that same day, that she and Taniguchi had separated and were currently in negotiations for a mutually-agreed divorce. The couple officially divorced on August 5, 2025.

== Public image ==
Once The Melancholy of Haruhi Suzumiya broadcast in 2006, Hirano received widespread media attention and popularity, which led her to be known as a "super idol" in the voice acting industry. In 2007, she was ranked No. 36 in Daitan Map's Top 50 Voice Actors. She also notably became a voice actor who was able to cross over to mainstream media, where she began appearing on variety shows since 2010. In 2011, Hirano was the 5th best-selling voice actress, making ¥120 million in total sales.

Beginning in 2010, Hirano drew criticism from her anime otaku fanbase when she openly discussed her dating and sex life on the variety show Goût Temps Nouveau, as well as the implication that she was abandoning voice acting in favor of a career in mainstream entertainment. In early 2011, an anonymous post on 2channel alleged from an acquaintance of a Lantis employee that Hirano had been dropped from the music label due to "excessively aggressive courting", in that she had sexual relations with three members from her back-up band. In August 2011, Japanese magazine Bubka published photos of the affair. The incidents caused several fans to destroy her merchandise, create petitions to remove her from her role in Kizumonogatari, and send death threats. Hirano stopped posting on Twitter beginning on May 18, 2013, allowing her team to use her account as an information channel. In December 2022, Hirano stated on Twitter that she still receives death threats whenever she does voice acting work for anime and cites it as a reason why she has largely stepped away from anime voice acting.

== Filmography ==
=== Anime ===
List of voice performances in anime
| Year | Title | Role | Notes | Source |
|---|---|---|---|---|
| 2001–03 | Angel Tales series | Saru no Momo | Debut role | |
| 2002 | Kiddy Grade | Lumière | | |
| 2003 | Beyblade G-Revolution | Ming-Ming | | |
| 2004 | Battle B-Daman | Charat | | |
| 2005 | Battle B-Daman: Fire Spirits | Pheles | | |
| 2005 | Eyeshield 21 | Mamori Anezaki | | |
| 2005 | Canvas 2: Niji Iro no Sketch | Sumire Misaki | | |
| 2005 | Itsudatte My Santa! | Mai | OVA | |
| 2006 | School Rumble series | Yoko Sasakura | starting in Second Semester (season 2) | |
| 2006 | Renkin 3-kyū Magical? Pokān | Pachira | | |
| 2006 | The Melancholy of Haruhi Suzumiya | Haruhi Suzumiya | | |
| 2006 | Nana | Reira Serizawa | | |
| 2006–07 | Himawari! series | Shikimi | | |
| 2006 | Galaxy Angel-Rune | Kahlua/Tequila Marjoram | | |
| 2006 | Death Note | Misa Amane | | |
| 2006 | Buso Renkin | Mahiro Muto | | |
| 2006 | Sumomomo Momomo | Sanae Nakajima | | |
| 2007 | Gakuen Utopia Manabi Straight! | Mei Etoh | | |
| 2007–08 | Lucky Star series | Konata Izumi, Haruhi Suzumiya (cameo), Herself (cameo) | | |
| 2007 | Hello Kitty: Apple Forest and the Parallel Town | Emily | | |
| 2007 | Mokke | Reiko Nagasawa | | |
| 2007 | Dragonaut: The Resonance | Garnet MacLaine | | |
| 2007–present | Soreike! Anpanman | Tanpopochan, Kokinchan | guest roles | |
| 2008 | Moegaku★5 | Megami-sama | | |
| 2008 | Fist of the North Star: The Legend of Toki | Sara | OVA | |
| 2008 | Lupin III: Green Vs. Red | Yukiko | OVA | |
| 2008 | Macross Frontier | Mina Roshan, Nene Rora | | |
| 2008 | Zettai Karen Children series | Kaoru Akashi | | |
| 2008 | Nijū Mensō no Musume | Chizuko "Chiko" Mokamo | | |
| 2008 | Hyakko | Ayumi Nonomura | | |
| 2008 | Akaneiro ni Somaru Saka | Minato Nagase | | |
| 2008 | Linebarrels of Iron | Miu Kujō | | |
| 2008 | Kemeko Deluxe! | Nakamura-chan | | |
| 2009 | White Album series | Yuki Morikawa | | |
| 2009–11 | Maria Holic series | Shizu Shidō | | |
| 2009–10 | Queen's Blade series | Nanael | | |
| 2009–15 | Jewelpet series | Garnet, Komachi Saotome (Sunshine), Midori Akagi / Smart Green (Kira Deko) | | |
| 2009 | Dragon Ball Kai | Dende | | |
| 2009 | Kawa no Hikari | Tammy | TV special | |
| 2009 | Fight Ippatsu! Jūden-chan!! | Rona Elmo | | |
| 2009 | To | Arina | OVA | |
| 2009–11 | Kimi ni Todoke | Ume "Kurumi" Kurumizawa | | |
| 2009–present | Fairy Tail | Lucy Heartfilia | In Fairy Tail: 100 Years Quest from 2024 | |
| 2009 | Kiddy Girl-and | Lumiere | | |
| 2010–11 | The Qwaser of Stigmata series | Katja | | |
| 2010 | Lupin III: The Last Job | Asuka Kagurazaka | | |
| 2010 | Black Butler II | Hannah Annafellows | | |
| 2010–11 | Nura: Rise of the Yokai Clan series | Kana Ienaga | | |
| 2011 | Nichijou | Shogi King tile, Angel from Helvetica Standard, Narration | Episode 9 | |
| 2011 | Hunter × Hunter | Menchi | | |
| 2012–13 | Recorder and Randsell series | Sayo Takahashi | | |
| 2011–18 | Gintama | Imai Nobume | | |
| 2012 | Girls und Panzer | Alisa | | |
| 2013–15 | Gatchaman Crowds series | Paiman | | |
| 2014 | Witch Craft Works | Weekend | | |
| 2014–15 | Dragon Ball Z Kai (Majin Buu saga) | Dende | | |
| 2014–15 | Parasyte | Migi | | |
| 2015–2018 | Dragon Ball Super | Dende | | |
| 2015 | Ultimate Otaku Teacher | Toune Yamato | | |
| 2015 | The Disappearance of Nagato Yuki-chan | Haruhi Suzumiya | | |
| 2020 | Maesetsu! | Hirano Sensei | | |
| 2022 | Pop Team Epic | Popuko | Ep. 1 Part A | |
| 2022 | Akiba Maid War | Okachimachi | Ep. 10 onward | |
| 2024 | One Piece | Vegapunk Lilith | | |
| 2025 | Detectives These Days Are Crazy! | Hana Kazamaki | | |

=== Live-action television series ===
| Year | Title | Role | Notes | Source |
|---|---|---|---|---|
| 2012 | Muse no Kagami | | | |
| 2021 | Koeharu! | Iwao | | |
| 2023 | Born to Be on Air! | Madoka Chishiro | | |
| 2025 | The Laughing Salesman | | Episode 11 | |

=== Drama CDs ===
List of voice performances in drama CD
| Year | Title | Role | Notes | Source |
|---|---|---|---|---|
| 2002 | Kiddy Grade Sound Layer | Lumière | | |
| 2006 | Buso Renkin | Mahiro Muto | | |
| 2006 | Hanbun no Tsuki ga Noboru Sora | Sayoko Natsume | | |
| 2007 | The Melancholy of Haruhi Suzumiya: Sound Around | Haruhi Suzumiya | | |
| 2007 | Tetsudou Musume ja:鉄道むすめ | Minami Kurihashi 栗橋みなみ | | |
| 2008 | Be with You | Mio Aio | | |
| 2008 | Maria Holic | Kanako Miyamae | | |
| 2008 | Lucky Star | Konata Izumi | | |
| 2009 | Psychic Detective Yakumo | Haruka Ozawa 小沢晴香 | | |
| 2008 | B. Ichi | Lin Kinpar | | resume |
| 2009 | Akane-iro ni Somaru Saka | Minato Nagase | | |
| 2009 | Kiss of Rose Princess | Anís Yamamoto | | resume |
| | Macross Frontier | Miina Roshan, Nene Nora | | |
| | White Album | Yuki Morikawa | | |
| | Nura: Rise of the Yokai Clan | Kana Ienaga | | |

=== Film ===
List of voice performances in film
| Year | Title | Role | Source |
|---|---|---|---|
| 2008 | Bleach: Fade to Black | Sister | |
| 2009 | Pyu to Fuku! Jaguar: Ima, Fuki ni Yukimasu | Hamyi | |
| 2009 | The Asylum Session ja:アジール・セッション | Hiyoko | |
| 2009 | Duel Masters: Lunatic God Saga | Runa Kamizuki | |
| 2009 | Macross Frontier: Itsuwari no Utahime | Mena Roshan | |
| 2010 | The Disappearance of Haruhi Suzumiya | Haruhi Suzumiya | |
| 2010 | Book Girl | Miu Asakura | |
| 2011 | Macross Frontier: Sayonara no Tsubasa | Mena Roshan | |
| 2012 | Let's Go! Anpanman: Rhythm and Play – Anpanman and the Strange Parasol | Kokin-chan | |
| 2012 | Jewelpet the Movie: Sweets Dance Princess | Garnet | |
| 2012 | Fairy Tail the Movie: Phoenix Priestess | Lucy Heartfilia | |
| 2013 | Hunter x Hunter: Phantom Rouge | Retz | |
| 2013 | Dragon Ball Z: Battle of Gods | Dende | |
| 2013 | Let's Go! Anpanman: Mischievous Ghost and Cuddling Together | Kokin-chan | |
| 2014 | Let's Go! Anpanman: Kokin-Chan Became a Mom and Play with Fun | Kokin-chan | |
| 2015 | Let's Go! Anpanman Mija and the Magic Lamp | Kokin-chan | |
| 2015 | Girls und Panzer der Film | Alisa | |
| 2016 | Let's Go! Anpanman: toy star of Nanda and Lunda | Kokin-chan | |
| 2017 | Fairy Tail: Dragon Cry | Lucy Heartfilia | |
| 2017 | Let's Go! Anpanman: Bulbul's Big Treasure Hunt Adventure | Kokin-chan | |
| 2022 | Jewelpet Attack Travel! | Garnet | |
| 2022 | Dragon Ball Super: Super Hero | Dende | |
| 2025 | The Rose of Versailles | Marie Antoinette | |
| 2025 | Let's Go! Anpanman: Chapon's Hero! | Kokin-chan | |

=== Theatre ===
List of performances on theatrical stage
| Year | Title | Role | Source |
|---|---|---|---|
| 2012–2018 | Love Letters | Melissa | |
| 2013–2015 | Les Misérables | Éponine | |
| 2014 | W. Shakespeare Human | Juliet | |
| 2014–2017 | Lady Bess | Lady Bess (Elizabeth I of England) | |
| 2014–2018 | Mozart! | Constanze | |
| 2015 | Spamalot | Lady of The Lake | |
| 2016 | The Mystery of Edwin Drood | Rosa Bud | |
| 2016 | Murder Ballad | Sarah | |
| 2018–2021 | Bullets Over Broadway | Olive Neal | |
| 2018–2019 | Rebecca | I | |
| 2019 | Rockabilly Jack | Samantha Rossi | |
| 2020 | Sunset Boulevard | Betty Schaefer | |
| 2021 | Anything Goes | Erma | |
| 2022 | Joseph and the Amazing Technicolor Dreamcoat | The Narrator | |
| 2023 | Chainsaw Man | Makima | |
| 2024 | In This Corner of the World | Rin Shiraki | |
| 2024–2026 | 9 to 5 | Doralee Rhodes | |

=== Dubbing roles ===
Hirano has had dubbing roles in localized versions of a number of foreign television series and films.

List of dubbing performances
| Title | Role | Notes | Source |
|---|---|---|---|
| Listen to My Heart | Bong Woo-ri | Hwang Jung-eum | |
| Cao Cao | Diaochan | Han Xue | |
| City Hunter | Kim Na-na | Park Min-young | |
| CSI: Crime Scene Investigation | Haley Jones | Taylor Swift, Season 9 | |
| Dragonball Evolution | Bulma | Emmy Rossum | |
| Encanto | Isabela Madrigal | Diane Guerrero; Animation | |
| Giant | Lee Mi-joo | Hwang Jung-eum | |
| The Mermaid | Shan | Lin Yun | |
| Renaissance | Ilona Tasuiev | Romola Garai | |
| Shazam! | Mary | Grace Fulton / Michelle Borth | |
| Shazam! Fury of the Gods | Mary | Grace Fulton | |
| The Thieves | Yenicall | Jun Ji-hyun | |
| Zathura | Lisa | Kristen Stewart; 2008 NTV edition | |

=== Video games ===
List of voice performances in video games
| Year | Title | Role | Source |
|---|---|---|---|
| 2006 | Canvas 2: Niji Iro no Sketch | Sumire Misaki | |
| 2006 | Finalist | Honoka Serizawa | |
| 2006 | Eyeshield 21 Max Devil Power! | Mamori Anezaki | |
| 2006 | Galaxy Angel games | Kahlua/Tequila Marjoram | |
| 2006–07 | Nana games | Reira Serizawa | |
| 2007 | Luminous Arc | Lucia | |
| 2007 | Gakuen Utopia Manabi Straight! Kira Kira Happy Festa! | Mei Etoh | |
| 2007–08 | Eternal Sonata games | Polka | |
| 2007 | Sumomomo Momomo: The Strongest Bride on Earth | Sanae Nakajima | |
| 2007 | Buso Renkin Welcome Papillon to Park | Mahiro Muto | |
| 2007 | Final Fantasy Fables: Chocobo's Dungeon | Shirma Magnolie | |
| 2007–11 | Haruhi Suzumiya games | Haruhi Suzumiya | |
| 2008–10 | Lucky Star games | Konata Izumi | |
| 2008 | Final Approach 2: 1st Priority | Kanon Keiju | |
| 2008–09 | Katekyo Hitman Reborn! games | Rizona | |
| 2008–09 | Akaneiro ni Somaru Saka games | Minato Nagase | |
| 2008 | Sigma Harmonics | Neon Tsukiyomi | |
| 2008 | Memories Off 6: T-wave | Chisa Hakosaki | |
| 2008 | Zettai Karen Children DS: Dai-4 no Children | Kaoru Akashi | |
| 2008 | Final Fantasy Fables: Chocobo Tales | Shiroma | |
| 2009 | Arc Rise Fantasia | Ruche | |
| 2009 | Magna Carta 2 | Rzephilda "Zephie" Berlinette | |
| 2009 | Assassin's Creed 2 | Cristina Vespucci | |
| 2009–11 | Queen's Blade: Spiral Chaos | Nanael, Katja | |
| 2010 | Yakuza 4 | Hana | |
| 2010 | White Album | Yuki Morikawa | |
| 2010 | Assassin's Creed Brotherhood | Cristina Vespucci | |
| 2011 | Tales of the World: Radiant Mythology 3 | Kanonno Grassvalley | |
| 2011 | Dissidia 012 Final Fantasy | Prishe | |
| 2011 | Yakuza: Dead Souls | Hana | |
| 2011 | Final Fantasy Type-0 | Carla Ayatsugi | |
| 2012 | Nendoroid Generation | Haruhi Suzumiya | |
| 2012 | Aquapazza | Yuki Morikawa | |
| 2014 | Ryū ga Gotoku Ishin! | Ikumatsu 幾松 | |
| 2014 | Granblue Fantasy | Beatrix, Alexiel, Prishe | |
| 2014 | Final Fantasy Agito | Carla Ayatsugi | |
| 2014 | Girls und Panzer: Senshadō, Kiwamemasu | Alisa | |
| 2014 | Danganronpa Another Episode: Ultra Despair Girls | Monaca Towa | |
| 2015 | Final Fantasy Type-0 HD | Carla Ayatsugi | |
| 2017 | Xenoblade Chronicles 2 | Boreas | |
| 2019 | Dragalia Lost | Botan | |
| 2019 | Catherine: Full Body | Rin | |
| 2021 | Re:Zero − Starting Life in Another World: The Prophecy of the Throne | Sakura Element | |
| 2021 | Arknights | Flametail | |
| 2023 | Octopath Traveler II | Ochette | |
| 2023 | Fate/Samurai Remnant | Dorothea Coyett | |
| 2026 | Genshin Impact | Vesna | |

== Discography ==
=== Studio albums ===
List of studio albums, with selected chart positions
| Title | Album information | Oricon peak position |
|---|---|---|
| Riot Girl | Released: July 16, 2008; Label: Lantis; Catalog No.: LACA-5793 | 6 |
| Speed Star | Released: November 18, 2009; Label: Lantis; Catalog No.: LACA-35795 | 4 |
| Fragments | Released: May 23, 2012; Label: Universal Music; Catalog No.: UMCK-9487 | 12 |
| Vivid | Released: February 19, 2014; Label: Universal Music; Catalog No.: UMCK-9658 | 31 |

=== Compilation albums ===
List of compilation albums, with selected chart positions
| Title | Album information | Oricon peak position |
|---|---|---|
| Aya Museum | Released: May 25, 2011; Label: Lantis; Catalog No.: LACA-35115 | 5 |

=== Singles ===
List of singles, with selected chart positions
| Year | Title | Oricon peak position | Album |
|---|---|---|---|
| 2006 | "Breakthrough" | 79 | Riot Girl |
| 2006 | "Bōken Desho Desho?" | 10 | Riot Girl |
| 2006 | "Ashita no Prism" | 13 | Riot Girl |
| 2007 | "Love Gun" | 6 | Riot Girl |
| 2007 | "Neophilia" | 17 | Riot Girl |
| 2007 | "MonStAR" | 11 | Riot Girl |
| 2008 | "Unnamed World" | 20 | Speed Star |
| 2009 | "Set me free / Sing a song!" | 13 | Speed Star |
| 2010 | "Hysteric Barbie" | 9 | |
| 2013 | "TOxxxIC" | 24 | Vivid |
| 2013 | "Promise" | 36 | Vivid |
| 2025 | "Evolutions" | — | |

=== Character albums and singles ===
List of character albums and singles with selected chart positions
| Year | Title | Oricon peak position | Album |
|---|---|---|---|
| 2005 | Itsudatte My Santa! Character Song Vol. 1 Mai (Aya Hirano) | – | |
| 2006 | The Melancholy of Haruhi Suzumiya Character Song Vol.1 Haruhi Suzumiya; Haruhi Suzumiya (Aya Hirano) | 11 | |
| 2006 | Galaxy Angel Character Single Vol.4 Kahlua (Tequila) Marjoram; Kahlua (Tequila) Marjoram (Aya Hirano) | 108 | |
| 2007 | Tetsudo Musume Character Song Vol.1 Minami Kurihara; Minami Kurihara (Aya Hirano) | 85 | |
| 2007 | Lucky ☆ Star Character Song Vol.001 featuring Konata; Izumi Konata (Aya Hirano) | 8 | |
| 2008 | Zettai Karen Children Character CD 1st Session; Kaoru Akashi starring Aya Hirano | 68 | |
| 2008 | Memories Off 6 Personal Collection 2 Chisa Hakosaki (Aya Hirano) | 160 | |
| 2008 | "Namida Namida Namida" (涙 NAMIDA ナミダ) | 17 | |
| 2008 | "Mezame nai Wish"; Minato Nagase (Aya Hirano); Akane Iro ni Somaru Saka ending theme | 79 | |
| 2009 | The Melancholy of Haruhi Suzumiya New Character Song Vol.1 Haruhi Suzumiya; Haruhi Suzumiya (Aya Hirano) | 16 | |
| 2009 | White Album Character Song 1 Morikawa Yuki; Yuki Morikawa (Aya Hirano) | 23 | |
| 2009 | "Super Driver" | 3 | Speed Star |
| 2009 | Queen's Blade Character Song + Short Drama: Nanael; Nanael (Aya Hirano) | 167 | |
| 2009 | "EleC☆TriCk"; Rona (Aya Hirano) | 122 | |
| 2010 | "Koiiro Sora"; Yuki Morikawa (Aya Hirano) | 38 | |
| 2012 | "Zutto Kitto"; Lucy (Aya Hirano) | 146 | |
| 2015 | Nagato Yuki-chan no Shoushitsu Character Song Case 5 Haruhi Suzumiya (Aya Hirano) | 97 | |
| 2018 | Pride ～Granblue Fantasy～ Beatrix (Aya Hirano) | | |

=== Video albums ===
List of video albums, with selected chart positions
| Title | Video information | Oricon peak position |
|---|---|---|
| Animelo Summer Live 2007: Generation-A | Release date: November 28, 2007; Label: Lantis; Catalog No.: LABM-7015 | |
| Aya Hirano 1st Live 2008 Riot Tour Live | Release date: February 25, 2009; Label: Lantis; Catalog No.: LABM-7039 | |
| Aya Hirano Music Clip Collection Vol. 1 | Release date: September 9, 2009; Label: Lantis; Catalog No.: LABM-7055 | |
| Aya Hirano 2nd Live Tour 2009 "Speed Star Tours" Live DVD | Release date: June 23, 2010; Label: Lantis; Catalog No.: LABM-7067 | |
| Aya Hirano Fragments Live Tour 2012 Live DVD | Release date: November 28, 2012; Label: Universal Music; Catalog No.: UMBK-1191 | |

== Awards ==
| Year | Ceremony | Category | Nominee | Result | Source |
|---|---|---|---|---|---|
| 2007 | Seiyu Awards | Best Actress in leading role | Haruhi Suzumiya (The Melancholy of Haruhi Suzumiya) | Nominated | |
| 2007 | Seiyu Awards | Best Actresses in supporting roles | Amane Misa («Death Note») | Nominated | |
| 2007 | Seiyu Awards | Best Music Performance | «Bōken Desho Desho?» (The Melancholy of Haruhi Suzumiya) | Nominated | |
| 2007 | Seiyu Awards | Best Music Performance | «Hare Hare Yukai» (together with Yūko Gotō and Minori Chihara in The Melancholy of Haruhi Suzumiya) | Nominated | |
| 2007 | Seiyu Awards | Best Rookie Actresses | Haruhi Suzumiya (The Melancholy of Haruhi Suzumiya) | Won | |
| 2007 | Tokyo Anime Award | Best Voice Actor | Haruhi Suzumiya (The Melancholy of Haruhi Suzumiya) | Won | |
| 2008 | Seiyu Awards | Best Rookie Actresses | Haruhi Suzumiya (The Melancholy of Haruhi Suzumiya) | Won | |
| 2008 | Seiyu Awards | Best Music Performance | «Motteke! Sailor Fuku» (Lucky Star) | Won | |
