= Namida Namida Namida =

Single by Aya Hirano
- Released: October 8, 2008
- Genre: J-pop
- Label: Lantis
- Songwriter(s): Tsunku
- Producer(s): Tsunku

Aya Hirano singles chronology
"Unnamed World" (2008)	"Namida Namida Namida" (2008)

"Namida Namida Namida" (涙 NAMIDA ナミダ; Namida NAMIDA Namida) is a CD single by Japanese singer and voice actress Aya Hirano. It was released on October 8, 2008, and produced by Lantis. The song is used as the ending theme song for the anime Hyakko.

== Track listing ==
1. "Namida Namida Namida" (涙 NAMIDA ナミダ; Namida NAMIDA Namida)
  - Vocals: Aya Hirano
  - Lyrics: Tsunku
  - Arranger: Hirata Shiyōitirō
2. "WIN"
  - Vocals: Aya Hirano
  - Lyrics: Tsunku
  - Arranger: Daichi Hideyuki Suzuki
3. "Namida Namida Namida" (off vocal) (涙 NAMIDA ナミダ; Namida NAMIDA Namida (off vocal))
4. "WIN" (off vocal)
