= Hisaki Matsuura =

Japanese writer

Hisaki Matsuura (松浦 寿輝, Matsuura Hisaki; born March 18, 1954) is a Japanese professor, poet, and novelist.

== Life ==
Matsuura was born in Tokyo. In 1981 he obtained his Ph.D. in French literature from the University of Paris III: Sorbonne Nouvelle, and 1982 became an assistant professor in the French Department at the University of Tokyo where he is now a professor of culture and representation. He was supported by a 1997–98 Japan Foundation Fellowship at Harvard University.

== Awards ==
Matsuura has received a number of awards for his literary work, including a 2000 Akutagawa Prize for Hana kutashi (A Spoiling Rain), and the 2004 Yomiuri Prize for Hantō (The Peninsula). His serialized novel Kawa no Hikari (River's Light) has been adapted into an anime television special.

== Works in English translation ==
Novel

- Triangle (original title: Tomoe), trans. David Karashima (Dalkey Archive Press, 2014)

== Selected academic works ==
- "A Comparative Study on Images of 'Modernity'", The Japan Foundation Newsletter XXVI/No. 1, pages 7–8.
- Electronic Realism, translated by Indra Levy.
- The Memory of the Extra-Filmic: Preservation and Access to Materials for the Future of Film Studies
