= MonStar =

"MonStAR"

Single by Aya Hirano
- Released: December 5, 2007
- Genre: J-pop
- Label: Lantis

Aya Hirano singles chronology
"Neophilia" (2007)	"MonStAR" (2007)	"Unnamed World" (2008)

"MonStAR" is a CD single by Japanese singer and voice actress Aya Hirano. It was released on December 5, 2007 and was produced by Lantis. This is Aya Hirano's sixth maxi single and her third and last release from her three-month consecutive single release campaign.

== Track listing ==
1. "MonStAR"
  - Vocals: Aya Hirano
  - Lyrics: meg rock
  - Composer: Katsuhiko Kurosu
  - Arranger: nishi-ken
2. "Love Song"
3. "MonStAR" (off vocal)
4. "Love Song" (off vocal)
