= Neophilia (song) =

Single by Aya Hirano
- Released: November 7, 2007
- Genre: J-pop
- Label: Lantis

Aya Hirano singles chronology
"Love ★ Gun" (2007)	"Neophilia" (2007)	"MonStAR" (2007)

"Neophilia" is a CD single by Japanese singer and voice actress Aya Hirano. It was released on November 7, 2007 and was produced by Lantis. This is Aya Hirano's fifth maxi single and her second release from her three-month consecutive single release campaign.

== Track listing ==
1. "Neophilia" -4:02
  - Vocals: Aya Hirano
  - Lyrics: Shinya Saitou
  - Guitar: Yutaka Ishii
  - Bass: Katsuhiko Kurosu
2. "Forget me nots..." -4:05
  - Vocals: Aya Hirano
  - Lyrics: Katsuhiko Kurosu
  - Guitar: Daisuke Katou
  - Bass: Katsuhiko Kurosu
3. "Neophilia" (off vocal) -4:12
4. "Forget me nots..." (off vocal) -4:02
