= Cover dance =

Recreation of a dance choreography

Cover dance (also known as dance cover) is the act of replicating a dance choreography, particularly from Japanese idol or Korean idol music acts. As a genre on video-sharing services, the cover dance genre first emerged in March 2007 on Niconico. It has since then spread to YouTube and TikTok, in which dancers reenact the choreography of a song or music video or perform an original choreography for an existing song.

== History ==
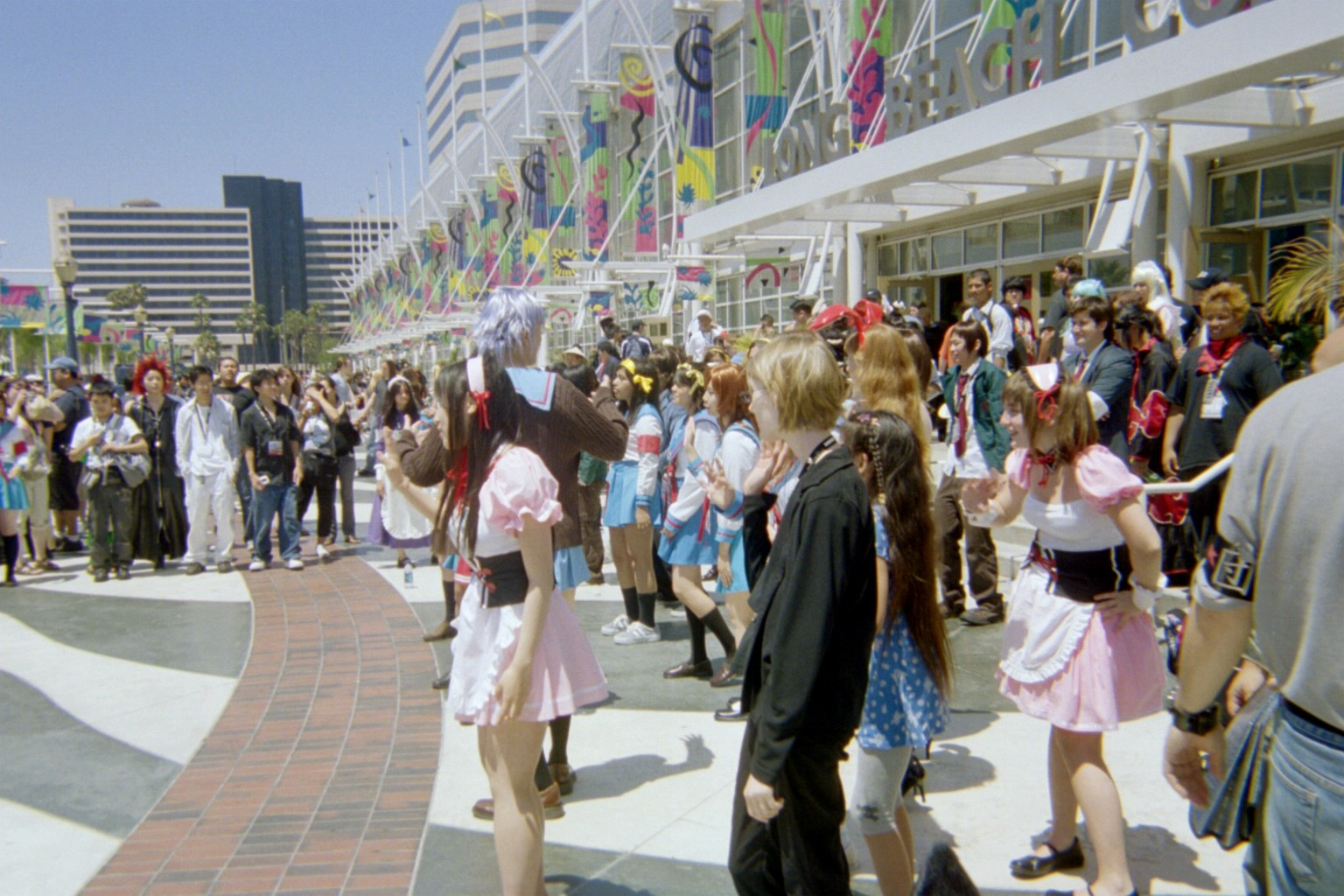
Fans performing the "Hare Hare Yukai" dance at Anime Expo 2007.

Cover dances first gained popularity online in Japan in March 2007, with many people posting videos of themselves performing the choreography for "Hare Hare Yukai" (colloquially referred to as the "Haruhi dance"), the ending theme song to the 2006 anime adaptation of The Melancholy of Haruhi Suzumiya. This later grew to include cover dances of Berryz Kobo and other Japanese idol singers and groups. Cover dance videos created through MikuMikuDance were also associated with the category. It became established as a genre known as odottemita (踊ってみた; lit. "I tried dancing") on video-sharing websites, named after the search keyword on the video-sharing website Niconico. People who performed cover dances were known as odorite (踊り手). Notable odorite who later became idols themselves include Kozue Aikawa from Danceroid and Dempagumi.inc, Beckii Cruel, and Keekihime.

== Impact ==
Cover dance videos on YouTube get tens of thousands of views, with groups like Chocomint HK becoming viral sensations.

A worldwide phenomenon, Paris has become a hub for recording these videos, and has a K-pop dance academy.

The K-POP Cover Dance Festival has been held annually since 2011. The competition takes place worldwide with the final round in Seoul.

== See also ==
- Dance crazes
