= Unnamed World =

Single by Aya Hirano

from the album Speed Star
- Released: April 23, 2008
- Genre: J-pop
- Label: Lantis
- Songwriter: Katsuhiko Kurosu

Aya Hirano singles chronology
"MonStAR" (2007)	"Unnamed World" (2008)	"Namida Namida Namida" (2008)

"Unnamed World" is a CD single by Japanese singer and voice actress Aya Hirano. It was released on April 23, 2008, and was produced by Lantis. The song "Unnamed World" is the ending theme song for the anime Nijū Mensō no Musume.

== Track listing ==
1. "Unnamed World"
  - Vocals: Aya Hirano
  - Composer: Katsuhiko Kurosu
  - Arranger: nishi-ken
2. "Maybe I Can't Good-bye"
3. "Unnamed World" (off vocal)
4. "Maybe I Can't Good-bye" (off vocal)
