= Breakthrough (Aya Hirano song) =

Single by Aya Hirano
- Released: March 8, 2006
- Genre: Video game soundtrack
- Length: 16:22
- Label: Lantis

Aya Hirano singles chronology
"Breakthrough"	"Bouken Desho Desho?"

"Breakthrough" is the debut single by Japanese singer and voice actress Aya Hirano. It was first released in Japan on March 8, 2006 by the record label Lantis. "Breakthrough" and "Ichiban Boshi" were the opening and ending themes of the Japanese PlayStation 2 visual novel Finalist, respectively.

== Track listing ==
1. "Breakthrough"
2. "Ichiban Boshi" (一番星, lit. First Star)
3. "Breakthrough" (off vocal)
4. "Ichiban Boshi" (off vocal) (一番星, lit. First Star)
