= Aki Hata =

Aki Hata 畑 亜貴
- Born: August 13, 1966 (age 60); Tokyo, Japan
- Genres: J-pop, Anison, video game
- Occupations: Musician, singer, lyricist, composer
- Years active: 1996-present
- Label: Lantis
- Website: metroforte.com

Aki Hata (畑 亜貴, Hata Aki; born August 13, 1966) is a Japanese musician, singer, lyricist and composer. She is noted for having penned and composed songs for various anime and video games, including popular titles like Zettai Shōnen, Azumanga Daioh, Haibane Renmei, Suzumiya Haruhi no Yūutsu, Rocket Knight Adventures, Lucky Star, the media franchise Love Live!, and for various singers and voice actresses. She was a composer for Konami and Treasure.

Aki Hata also sings herself. She is a member of the band Tsukihiko, providing the vocals and keyboard.

In 2015, she formed the production team "Q-MHz" with Tomokazu Tashiro, Katsuhiko Kurosu, and Tomoya Tabuchi (UNISON SQUARE GARDEN). At the Heisei Anison Grand Prize announced in 2019, seven of her own songs were selected, including three songs for the Lyricist Award.

== Discography ==
=== Solo works ===
==== Albums ====
- 1999-02-20: Kan'okejima
- 1999-02-20: Sekai Nante Owarinasai
- 2006-12-22: Roman Tsukira no Musumetachi ~BEST SONGS~
- 2007-12-21: Reizoku Kaibi no Musumetachi ~BEST SONGS II~
- 2014-19-03: Aisuru hito yo shinjitsu wa chikawazu ni iyou

==== Singles ====
- 2000-24-05: Bitsuu no rakuen
- 2000-23-08: Yokan no tenshi wo dakishimete
- 2010-13-10: Bannou ni tagiru ikasama
- 2010-22-12: Dangai no unuboreya
- 2011-21-12: Haikin seija waga machi o susuman
- 2016-05-25: Kobore Sekai Oware

=== Tsukihiko works ===
- 2005-09-20: Gen wa Jubaku no Yubi de Naru
- 2005-09-20: Tōhi Oukoku no Metsubō
- 2006-06-23: Tōhi Oukoku no Densetsu
