= Pretty Maid Café =

- Directed by: Akiyoshi Sugiura
- Release date: 2006
- Country: Japan
- Language: Japanese

Pretty Maid Café (恋するメイドカフェ, Koisuru Maid Cafe) is a romantic comedy Japanese film with thriller elements directed by Akiyoshi Sugiura and released in 2006 by VAP. It is part of the Akihabara Trilogy of films revolving around the Akihabara cosplay and otaku subcultures, especially maid cafés. It was distributed in the United States by Asia Pulp Cinema.

== Plot ==
A shy law student falls in love with a maid café worker and tries to win her heart with the help of his friend who is a NEET otaku and idol pop fan, while a mysterious stalker follows their steps.

== Cast ==
- Jun Takatsuki
- Taketora Morita
- Taichi Hirabayashi
