= Cat Girl Kiki =

- Directed by: Akiyoshi Sugiura
- Release date: 2006
- Country: Japan
- Language: Japanese

Cat Girl Kiki (猫耳少女キキ, Nekomimi Shōjo Kiki) is a 2006 Japanese fantasy comedy drama film directed by Akiyoshi Sugiura and starring Yui Kano. It is part of the Akihabara Trilogy of films released by VAP revolving around the Akihabara cosplay and otaku subcultures. It was distributed in the United States by Asia Pulp Cinema.

== Plot ==
Yoshirou Takagi, a recluse young adult (hikikomori), adopts a stray cat, Kiki, which magically turns into a catgirl (a human girl with feline characteristics) who attempts to help him deal with his solitude.

As Yoshirou teaches Kiki how to behave more like a human, he also makes her wear a maid cosplay and a Japanese school uniform.

== Credited cast ==
- Yui Kano as Kiki
- Teruaki Uotani as Yoshirou Takagi
- Minami Aoyama as Yuka Sanada
- Katsuya Kobayashi as Shingo Noda
- Youko Teramura
- Ao Shimizu
- Wakako Kurahashi
- Hideyuki Inoue
