= List of Call of the Night episodes =

Key visual for the series

Call of the Night is an anime television series based on the manga series of the same name by Kotoyama. In November 2021, an official website opened to announce an anime adaptation produced by Liden Films. It was directed by Tomoyuki Itamura, with Tetsuya Miyanishi serving as chief director for the first season, Michiko Yokote writing the series' scripts, Haruka Sagawa designing the characters and serving as chief animation director, and Yoshiaki Dewa composing the music. The first season aired from July 8 to September 30, 2022, on Fuji TV's Noitamina programming block. (Note: Fuji TV listed the series premiere as airing on July 7 at 24:55, which is effectively July 8 at 12:55 a.m. JST.) The opening theme song is "Daten" (堕天; lit. 'Fallen Angel'), while the ending theme song is "Yofukashi no Uta" (よふかしのうた; lit. 'Call of the Night'), both performed by Creepy Nuts.

At the Fuji TV Anime Lineup Press Conference 2024 event in March 2024, a second season was announced, which aired from July 4 to September 19, 2025, on the same programming block on Fuji TV and its affiliates. The opening theme song is "Mirage", while the ending theme song is "Nemure" (眠れ; lit. 'Sleep'), both also performed by Creepy Nuts.

Sentai Filmworks licensed the series for streaming on Hidive in North America, Europe, Oceania, and selected Latin American and Asian territories, which at their Otakon panel in July 2022, announced that the series would also receive an English dub, which premiered on September 8 of the same year. Sentai Filmworks also licensed the second season for streaming on Hidive, with the English dub premiering on September 3 of the same year.

== Series overview ==
Season	Episodes	Originally released	
Season	Episodes	First released	Last released
1	13	July 8, 2022	September 30, 2022
2	12	July 4, 2025	September 19, 2025

== Episodes ==
=== Season 1 (2022) ===
No. overall	No. in season	Title	Directed by (Note: Production staff information is taken from the ending credits of each episode.)	Storyboarded by	Original release date
1	1	"Night Flight"; Transliteration: "Naito Furaito" (Japanese: ナイトフライト)	Satoshi Takafuji	Tetsuya Miyanishi	July 8, 2022
After rejecting a classmate's love confession, 14-year-old Ko Yamori becomes disillusioned and restless, leading to insomnia and nightly walks through the city. One night, he encounters a mysterious and alluring girl named Nazuna, who diagnoses his insomnia as stemming from dissatisfaction with life. Inviting him to her apartment to help him sleep, she surprises him by insisting they share a bed. An anxious Ko pretends to be asleep only for Nazuna to reveal herself as a vampire and drink his blood, declaring it unusually delicious. Shocked, Ko confronts her, but Nazuna explains that he will not turn into a vampire unless he falls in love with one before being bitten. Embarrassed by the admission, she drinks a beer to cover her flustered state. Though initially relieved, Yamori becomes fascinated by the thrill of his new nocturnal encounters. Believing he has finally found meaning in the night, he boldly declares his intent to fall in love with Nazuna so he can become a vampire. Amused and intrigued, Nazuna agrees to spend more nights together in exchange for his blood, leaving open the possibility of his transformation if genuine love ever blossoms between them.
2	2	"Do You Do LINE?"; Transliteration: "Teka Rain Yatteru?" (Japanese: てかラインやってる?)	Jutarō Sekino	Jutarō Sekino	July 15, 2022
Nazuna once again flusters Ko by casually comparing her act of drinking blood to having sex. Despite the awkwardness, Yamori reaffirms his desire to become a vampire. Turning the tables, he embarrasses Nazuna by offering his blood freely. The next night, Ko feels jealous when he learns Nazuna drinks blood from random strangers. Wanting to feel more connected, he suggests exchanging contact information only to find out she does not own a phone. She takes him to her apartment and reveals her outdated brick phone, which amuses him. As she prepares for bed, she invites the nervous Ko to join her again. Initially hesitant to let her drink his blood, he ultimately consents when she shyly admits she had actually been looking for him that night. The following evening, Yamori gives her a wrist receiver to stay in touch, while he keeps the matching transmitter. He uses it to tell her from afar that their dynamic feels like that of a couple, embarrassing her. On his school rooftop, he affectionately calls her "Nazuna-chan" and formally asks her to be his friend. Later, his wrist receiver activates and another girl wearing the matching device appears beside him.
3	3	"A Lot Came Out"; Transliteration: "Ippai Detane" (Japanese: いっぱい出たね)	Shōgo Ono & Takashi Yasui	Takashi Yasui	July 22, 2022
Akira Asai tells Ko she waited for him to reach out but is still glad to see him. This prompts Ko to recall how Akira first befriended him. The next day, Nazuna teasingly accuses Ko of meeting another girl, and his awkward reaction confirms her suspicion. Later, Ko meets Akira, but Nazuna soon appears and playfully mocks them. To prove their relationship is purely physical, Nazuna drinks Ko's blood right in front of Akira. At a café, Ko confesses to Akira that he lets Nazuna drink his blood because of his dissatisfaction with school. Akira sympathizes and invites him to return to school with her. After Nazuna introduces herself formally, she and Ko leave. When Ko asks if she is upset, Nazuna walks off without answering. Later, Ko trips and injures his mouth, prompting him to call Nazuna and apologize for seeing Akira in secret. Nazuna suddenly appears and admits she feared he would stop spending time with her if he returned to school. Ko confesses he could not tell Akira the real reason he left school, which is his dream to become a vampire. Relieved, Nazuna drinks from the cut on his lip and then leaps away, leaving Ko stunned and speechless.
4	4	"Isn't This a Tight Squeeze?"; Transliteration: "Semakunai?" (Japanese: せまくない？)	Nobuhiro Mutō	Yūichi Itō & Tetsuya Miyanishi	July 29, 2022
While he ponders about what happened, and after witnessing a couple kissing, Ko assumes that he has already fallen in love with Nazuna. Nazuna finds Yamori and he eagerly lets her drink his blood, but after he does not transform, Nazuna explains that he is confusing love with lust. After they both reveal it was their first kiss, Nazuna believes kissing is something friends do. The next night, Ko invites Akira to hang out at Nazuna's apartment. There, they play Street Fighter Zero 3, as Nazuna offers kisses to whoever can beat her. Akira discovers of Nazuna and Ko's kiss, and tries to dissuade him from falling in love with a vampire. Nazuna explains that Ko does not like her yet. After they play a dating sim titled Doki Doki Sewing Club!!, they lie down to sleep, despite Akira feeling weird with them all sleeping in one bed. After Nazuna explains their mutually beneficial relationship to Akira, Ko tells her of how he will become a vampire if he falls in love with Nazuna. After Nazuna falls asleep, Akira tells Ko that they can still be friends even if he becomes a vampire, also saying she will not give up in trying to make him return to school.
5	5	"Well, That's a Problem"; Transliteration: "Sorya Komatta Yatsu desu ne" (Japanese: そりゃ困ったやつですね)	Keisuke Ōnishi	Keisuke Ōnishi	August 5, 2022
Nazuna visits a bathhouse and instructs the clerk to notify her if her wrist receiver beeps. When it does, she rushes out wearing only a long jacket to meet Ko. After Ko takes a bath, he begins feeling flustered by Nazuna's appearance, which she playfully teases him about. She then drinks his blood, and they decide to rest, unknowingly entering a love hotel. Inside, Nazuna explains that the taste of a person's blood reflects their thoughts and emotions, and she teases Yamori specifically because it enhances the flavor. Afterward, Ko becomes jealous when Nazuna recognizes someone she previously drank blood from, but she assures him that he is currently the only one she is interested in. They head back to Nazuna's apartment, where she reveals that she runs a massage parlor out of her home. She offers Ko a free massage, focusing on pressure points to help him relax before attempting to drink his blood again. Just as things intensify, a client unexpectedly arrives. Ko is forced to greet the customer himself, while Nazuna hides in her room playing games. Afterward, she thanks him and promises a kiss as a reward for covering for her, leaving Ko both thrilled and overwhelmed.
6	6	"Might as Well Have Fun"; Transliteration: "Tanoshī Hōgai yo" (Japanese: 楽しい方がいいよ)	Satoshi Takafuji	Satoshi Takafuji	August 12, 2022
Kiyosumi Shirakawa recalls the first night she took Nazuna's massage services. In the present, Ko undertakes her massage. After learning his age, Kiyosumi asks for his motivations, and he explains he got fed up with school and just wants to enjoy nights. Kiyosumi realizes how she is genuinely unhappy at her work and breaks down crying. A worried Ko refuses to let her answer a call from her boss, and to make her experience a thrill, has Nazuna throw her from the window, saving her just in time. Ko apologizes for the scare and tells Kiyosumi his and Nazuna's secret. He takes her to walk down the middle of the street, from which she gets a sense of freedom. She thanks Ko for alleviating some of her stress and encourages him to achieve his goal. However, Ko tells her he will turn her into a vampire as well, delighting Kiyosumi and embarrassing Nazuna. Sometime later, Ko and Nazuna attend a night pool resort, where Ko pulls Nazuna away from two guys hitting on her. Sensing his jealousy, Nazuna flies him to another pool where they enjoy themselves and she drinks his blood.
7	7	"Reproduce"; Transliteration: "Kozukuri" (Japanese: 眷属作(こづく)り)	Jutarō Sekino	Jutarō Sekino	August 19, 2022
After running into Kiyosumi, Ko is approached by a flirtatious blonde. After she tells him she is bored with her recent life, Ko tries to console her by saying they are the same. She jumps and embraces him, ready to suck his blood. However, Nazuna saves him just in time, as she explains she would just drink all of his blood and kill him. However, another vampire captures Ko and takes him atop a building, where three other vampires await. They introduce themselves as Niko Hirata, Midori Kohakobe, Hatsuka Suzushiro and Kabura Honda, as Niko tells him to choose amongst them, saying his choice will make him fall in love and convert him. However, Ko rejects all their advances in favor of Nazuna. Meanwhile, Seri Kikyo, the blonde vampire, tells Nazuna to stop playing with Ko if she does not intend to mate with him, but she says she actually wants to, stunning her. Ko keeps spurning the vampires, finally yelling that it will be Nazuna who conquers him just as she arrives. Seeing her newfound interest to leave descendants, the girls accept Ko, who declares he will fall in love with Nazuna.
8	8	"All of Us"; Transliteration: "Doitsumo Koitsumo" (Japanese: どいつもこいつも)	Michita Shiraishi	Junichi Sakata & Tetsuya Miyanishi	August 26, 2022
The vampires reveal to Ko that after being bitten, a human has exactly one year to fall in love and be bitten again to become a vampire. If not, they risk death. Nazuna dismisses the concern and fulfills her earlier promise by kissing Ko. Ko shares the revelation with Akira, who warns him that the vampires might kill him if he fails to turn. That night, Akira encounters a drunk Mahiru Seki, an old friend, who drunkenly gushes about a mysterious woman he sees at night. Later, Ko meets with Seri and asks what it feels like to fall in love. Seri suggests he take Nazuna on a proper date to figure out his feelings. Ko convinces Nazuna to go by unplugging her video game. During the outing, Nazuna realizes Seri influenced him and leaves in frustration. Depressed, Ko sulks at home until Nazuna finds his date itinerary. Moved, she takes him flying through the sky and drinks his blood mid-air. Days later, Ko chats with Mahiru and Akira at a park, unknowingly inspiring Mahiru with his comments about his bond with Nazuna. Later, Nazuna and Ko hold hands to stay close as Mahiru walks by with his mysterious girlfriend.
9	9	"No Fair"; Transliteration: "Zurui" (Japanese: ずるい)	Shōgo Ono	Tomoyuki Itamura & Takashi Yasui	September 2, 2022
Ko runs into Kikyō but Nazuna stops her and exclaims that Seri herself condemned friendships between humans and vampires. Later, Ko finds Seri again, so they go to a karaoke bar where Seri explains how harsh people can be, to which Ko agrees. Just then, one of Seri's admirers begins knocking at the door. Ko opposes her killing him, but she explains that her antics are not wrong if his death does not affect himself. She attacks, but Ko gets in her way and escapes with him. Ko deduces Akihito Akiyama likes Seri and he recalls how they met after she found him drunk. Seri arrives and she tries to kill Akiyama and Ko, but Nazuna stops her. Akiyama reveals they used to be friends but he accidentally fell in love with her, which collided with her hatred for romance. Seri confirms this and agrees to never see Akiyama again. However, she breaks down crying, exclaiming she had fun being his friend and wants to continue. Akiyama offers to become her progeny, to which Seri agrees and converts him. They all go to the karaoke to celebrate, with Nazuna exclaiming she and Ko can take their time.
10	10	"Enlarge the Peeping-Tom Photos"; Transliteration: "Totogazō o Kakudai Shite Miru" (Japanese: 盗撮画像を拡大して見る)	Jutarō Sekino, Yuki Komada, Yasushi Tomoda, Ōri Yasukawa, Minami Honma & Tetsuya Miyanishi (Note: Credited as Episode Generalization (演出統括, Enshutsu Tōkatsu))	Tetsuya Miyanishi	September 9, 2022
Midori needs to find someone to work a shift at the vampire-themed maid café where she works who will not upstage her and ends up convincing Nazuna to do the job while she is out on another stroll with Ko. Ko decides to stay at the café as a customer and is served by another waitress named Arisa, who tells him about her own love of maid cafés. As Midori plans to post photos for the café's social media, she notices several creepshots of Arisa uploaded to the same folder, and asks Ko to help her find the culprit. Ko and Nazuna spend time surveying the scene, trying to figure out how the voyeur could achieve the angles featured in the photos. Suddenly, Ko has an epiphany and sets up a sting with Midori later that night, catching the real culprit in the act who turns out to be Arisa herself. Arisa admits to taking risqué photos of herself out of a narcissistic desire for recognition after losing the top maid spot to Midori. Arisa plans to quit the café but Midori forgives her, saying that all the café maids are working there out of some desire for recognition themselves.
11	11	"Do You Know What a Vampire Is?"; Transliteration: "Kyūketsuki tte Shitterukai?" (Japanese: 吸血鬼って知ってるかい?)	Jutarō Sekino, Satoshi Takafuji, Yū Agata & Tetsuya Miyanishi (Note: Credited under the pseudonym Setsumu Dōkawa (堂川セツム))	Satoshi Takafuji	September 16, 2022
Nazuna uses her extra income from the café to upgrade her apartment and asks Ko to help find new clients for her sleeping service. During scouting, Ko approaches a tired-looking woman smoking on a bridge. She takes him to a café where he tries to pitch Nazuna's service. The woman jokingly threatens to report Nazuna for violating child labor laws and reveals she is a private detective named Anko Uguisu. When she questions Ko about Akiyama, he lies, claiming not to know him, and Uguisu lets him go. She pays for his coffee and leaves him with change, which he spends on beer for Nazuna. Unbeknownst to him, Uguisu begins tailing him. Later, Ko meets Mahiru and Akira to explore their school's "seven mysteries". Most turn out false, but in a supposedly haunted classroom they encounter a vampire who attacks Akira and tries to drink her blood. Ko manages to fend him off and the kids flee, but the vampire chases them. Uguisu appears and exposes the hallway to sunlight, incinerating him. When Ko asks why she did not let him die peacefully, Uguisu coldly scolds him, calling him naïve about vampires and the dangers they pose.
12	12	"My Mom's Out Tonight"; Transliteration: "Kyōuchi Oya Inainda" (Japanese: 今日ウチ親いないんだ)	Keisuke Ōnishi	Keisuke Ōnishi	September 23, 2022
Shaken by the incident of the previous night, Ko reconsiders becoming a vampire. Nazuna, noticing Ko's discomfort, assures him that the starved vampire at the school was not a typical case. Ko speaks to Mahiru about the previous night, and is asked why he wishes to become a vampire and advised to consider if it is a good idea. Visiting Ko's apartment, Nazuna tells him that she has been a vampire for a long time, and that it is not as exciting as it may seem. Unsure what to do, Ko meets with Uguisu. Uguisu says she is opposed to Ko becoming a vampire, as she believes that vampires are a threat to humanity, and presents him with an ultimatum: if he promises to abandon wanting to be a vampire, she will protect him and tell him how to kill them. When Ko refuses, Uguisu calls the police and reports Ko for breaking curfew. Ko flees the area before the police arrive, and hides at a playground, where he is found by Hatsuka.
13	13	"Call of the Night"; Transliteration: "Yofukashi no Uta" (Japanese: よふかしのうた)	Shōgo Ono	Tomoyuki Itamura	September 30, 2022
Hatsuka brings Ko to his apartment and asks for a towel while showering. When Ko enters the bathroom, he discovers Hatsuka is male, which stuns him. Meanwhile, Nazuna worries Ko no longer wants to become a vampire and asks Niko and the others to let him live. Niko is enraged that Nazuna wants to break their deal and violently smashes the table, threatening to kill Ko herself. Back at Hatsuka's, Ko reflects on his frightening experience with Uguisu and the vampire she killed. Sensing Ko's fear, Hatsuka offers to turn him into a vampire himself, believing it is the quickest way to protect both him and Nazuna. While Ko feels a mild attraction for Hatsuka, he declines the offer. A determined Ko then rushes to the rooftop where he first met the vampire group. Niko dissuades him from searching for Nazuna, claiming she is gone and will not speak to him again. Ko angrily tells her off and runs away to find Nazuna. He discovers her at the vending machine where they first met. There, Nazuna quietly vows to become a vampire worthy of his love and kisses him.

=== Season 2 (2025) ===
No. overall	No. in season	Title	Directed by	Storyboarded by	Original release date
14	1	"That Time's Not for Us."; Transliteration: "Sore wa Bokura no Jikan Janai" (Japanese: それは僕らの時間じゃない)	Nao Miyoshi	Tomoyuki Itamura	July 4, 2025
15	2	"I've Been Looking for You."; Transliteration: "Aitakatta yo" (Japanese: 会いたかったよ)	Nobuhiro Mutō	Tomoyuki Itamura	July 11, 2025
16	3	"There Aren't Any Ghosts in a Haunted House."; Transliteration: "Obake Yashiki ni wa Obakeinai" (Japanese: おばけ屋敷にはおばけいない)	Shinobu Yoshioka	Shinobu Yoshioka	July 18, 2025
17	4	"Do You Want to Be Able to Run?"; Transliteration: "Hashireru yō ni Naritai Kai?" (Japanese: 走れるようになりたいかい？)	Keisuke Ōnishi	Migmi & Tomoyuki Itamura	July 25, 2025
18	5	"The Few Years I Spent with You..."; Transliteration: "Anata to Sugoshita Sūnenkan" (Japanese: あなたと過ごした数年間)	Nobuhiro Mutō	Tomoyuki Itamura	August 1, 2025
19	6	"I'm Not Asking About the Quality."; Transliteration: "Kuoritī o Kīterunja nē yo" (Japanese: クオリティーを聞いてるんじゃねぇよ)	Nao Miyoshi	Nao Miyoshi	August 8, 2025
20	7	"You're Too Stupid for That."; Transliteration: "Nanakusa-san Bakada kara" (Japanese: 七草さん馬鹿だから)	Misato Takada & Nao Miyoshi	Namako Umino	August 15, 2025
21	8	"You're the First, Senpai."; Transliteration: "Senpai ga Hajimetessu yo" (Japanese: 先輩が初めてっすよ)	Nao Miyoshi	Rei Nakahara & Tomoyuki Itamura	August 22, 2025
22	9	"Yamori-kun, What Do You Want to Do?"; Transliteration: "Yamori-kun, Kimi wa dō Shitai?" (Japanese: 夜守くん、君はどうしたい？)	Keisuke Ōnishi	Keisuke Ōnishi	August 29, 2025
23	10	"I Wanted It to Be You."; Transliteration: "Semete Omae ni" (Japanese: せめてお前に)	Nobuhiro Mutō	Masao Suzuki & Tomoyuki Itamura	September 5, 2025
24	11	"Mwah..."; Transliteration: "Nchiyu" (Japanese: んちゅ)	Nao Miyoshi	Namako Umino	September 12, 2025
25	12	"Call of the Night"; Transliteration: "Yofukashi no Uta" (Japanese: よふかしのうた)	Nao Miyoshi	Namako Umino & Tomoyuki Itamura	September 19, 2025

== Home media release ==
=== Japanese ===
Aniplex (Japan – Region 2/A)
Vol.	Episodes	Cover character	Release date	Ref.
Season 1
1	1–6	Nazuna Nanakusa	October 26, 2022	
2	7–13	Ko Yamori	January 25, 2023	
Season 2
1	1–6	Anko Uguisu	October 29, 2025	
2	7–12	Nazuna Nanakusa	January 28, 2026	

=== English ===
Sentai Filmworks (North America – Region 1/A)
Season	Episodes	Release date	Ref.
1	1–13	September 5, 2023	
