= Mosaic.wav =

Japanese pop band

MOSAIC.WAV
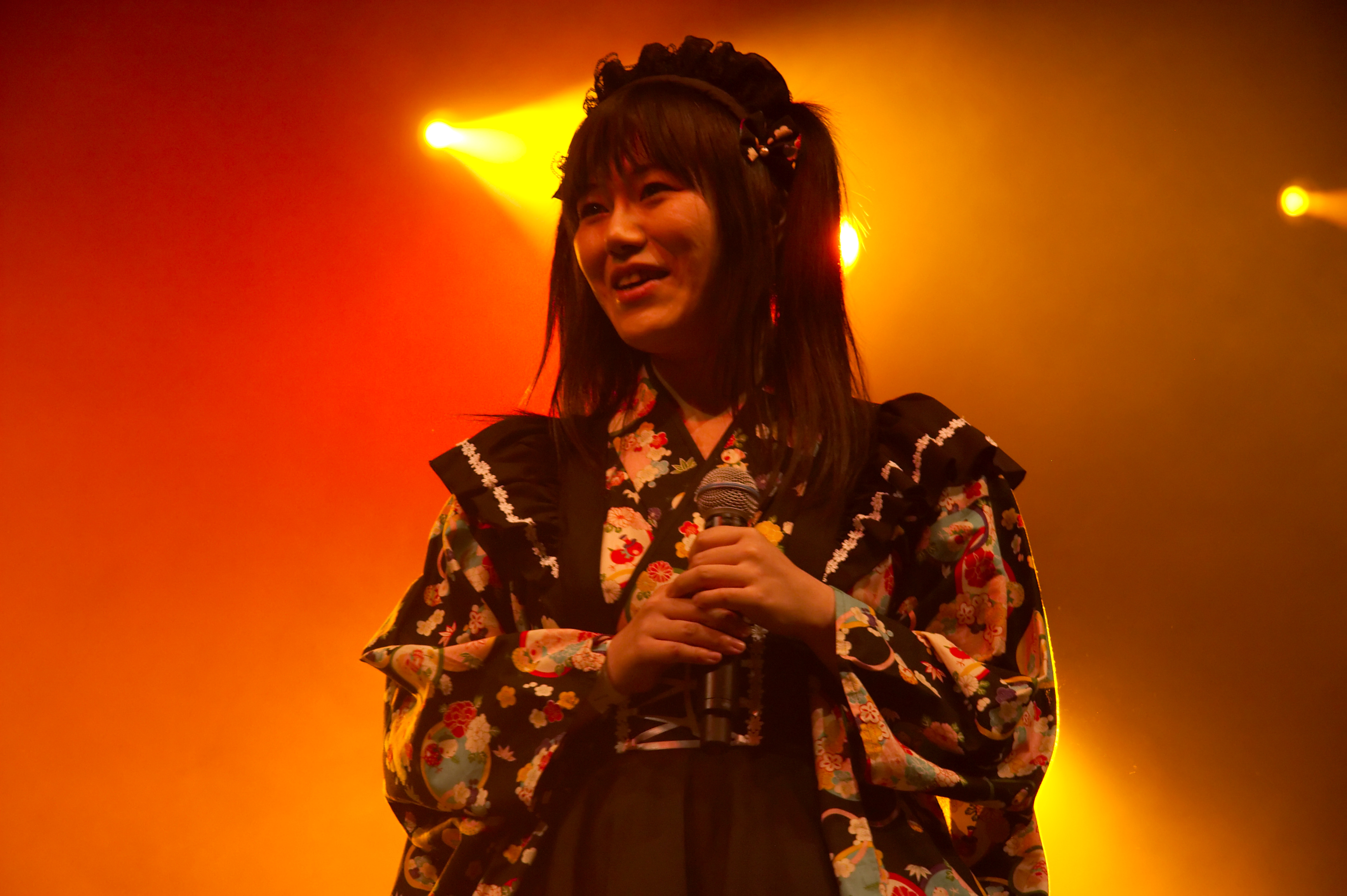
- Mosaic.wav at Japan Expo 2009.

Background information
- Origin: Akihabara, Tokyo, Japan
- Genres: J-pop, denpa, anison
- Years active: 2004-present
- Members: MI-KO; Susumu Kayamori; Masaya Koike
- Website: mosaicwav.com

Mosaic.wav (モザイクウェブ, Mozaiku Webu) (stylized MOSAIC.WAV) is a Japanese moe-pop band from Akihabara that’s widely known for doing theme songs to eroge based visual novels; they eventually began to produce their own original work starting from 2004. During an interview with JaME, Kayamori stated their name was chosen in connection to church windows, and that they believe that the name really represents colour and different passions. The second half of the band's name refers to the digital sound file format WAV. Their songs have also been used as opening songs for Sumomomo Momomo and Kyouran Kazoku Nikki. The band is fronted by vocalist MI-KO with Susumu Kayamori on keyboard and Masaya Koike on guitar.

== Career ==
Mosaic.wav has originally formed in 2004 after composing several eroge fused theme songs. The group refers to their musical style as "Akiba-Pop", in reference to Akihabara, which is closely associated with otaku culture.

In 2015, MOSAIC.WAV has composed the soundtrack for the anime adaptation of the novel series School-Live!.

== Discography ==
Most of this content was taken from the Video Game Music Database (VGMDb).

=== Singles ===
- Magical Hacker☆Kurukuru Risk (Magical Hacker☆くるくるリスク) (May 14, 2004)
- Kimi wa Nan Terabyte? (キミは何テラバイト?) (October 28, 2005)
- Megane de ne! (めがねでねっ！) (September 8, 2006)
- Kyun Kyun Panic (キュン・キュン・パニック) (August 23, 2006) (Mamotte! Lollipop ED Theme)
- Saikyou○×Keikaku (最強○×計画) (October 25, 2006) (Sumomomo, Momomo OP1 Theme)
- Girigiri Kagaku Shoujo Falsie (ギリギリ科学少女ふぉるしぃ) (December 29, 2006)
- Setsujou! Hyakka Ryouran (切情！佰火繚乱) (January 24, 2007) (Sumomomo, Momomo OP2 Theme)
- Katamichi Catchball (片道きゃっちぼーる) (July 25, 2007) (Potemayo OP Theme)
- Denou Kassen×Uju no Jin! (電脳合戦×うじゅの陣！) (October 20, 2007)
- Last Battle! Akibattler "μ" (ラストバトル！アキバトラー"μ") (February 1, 2008)
- Chousai Kenbo Sengen (超妻賢母宣言) (Kyouran Kazoku Nikki OP Theme) (April 23, 2008)
- SPAM Mailing Girl (迷惑メーリングGIRL) (August 15, 2008)
- Kodomosaic・Yamimosaic (こどもざいく・やみもざいく) (December 27, 2008)
- Otoko no Musume no Tobira (おとこの娘のトビラ) (December 29, 2009)
- Zen Sekai Teki Touchpanel (全世界的タッチパネル) (August 13, 2009)
- Nou・Nai・Sai・Sei ～ecphoric dance～ (脳・内・再・醒 ～ecphoric dance～) (September 15, 2010)
- H na Kuni no Kyouiku Jijou (Hな国の教育事情) (August 12, 2011)

=== Albums ===
- We Love "AKIBA-POP"!! (October 29, 2004)
- SPACE AKIBA-POP (January 20, 2006)
- Future-Fiction:AKIBA-POP!! (August 31, 2007)
- Amusement Pack (March 26, 2008)
- Superluminal Ж AKIBA-POP (April 15, 2009)
- Heartsnative (October 21, 2009)
- Ginyuu Planet ☆ AKIBA-POP (吟遊Planet☆AKIBA-POP) (March 3, 2011)
- AKIBA-POP√RECOLLECTION (November 23, 2011)
- Minna Miku Miku ni Shite Ageru ♪ ~Heartsnative2~ (みんなみくみくにしてあげる♪~Heartsnative2~) (November 7, 2012)
- Astronomical Φ AKIBA-POP!! (December 11, 2013)
- Transistor no Doukedan ~Heartsnative3~ (トランジスタの道化団～Heartsnative3～) (December 11, 2013)
- MOSAIC.lassic ~Futari no Happy☆Island~ (MOSAIC.lassic~ふたりのはっぴー☆あいらんど~) (January 30, 2015)
- Miracleluminal Mosaic.Live!! MOSAIC.WAV 15th Anniv. (October 18, 2018)
- MiracleluminalΣAKIBA-POP (October 18, 2018)
- AKIBA-POP И SCRIPTER ~MOSAIC.WAV GAME SONG COLLECTION~ (December 23, 2020)
- Quiet MOSAIC.LIVE ~Keep on the AKIBA-POP~ (2Discs) (October 31, 2021)
- Gacha Gacha Cute ・ Figu@Hensoukyoku [Variation] ~Figu@15th Anniv.~ (ガチャガチャきゅ〜と・ふぃぎゅ@変奏曲[ヴァリエーション]〜Figu@15th Anniv.〜 ) (January 28, 2022)
