= Legend of the Doll =

- Directed by: Toshiro Goto
- Release date: 2006
- Country: Japan
- Language: Japanese

Legend of the Doll (聖・美少女フィギュア伝, Sei Bishōjo Figyua Den) is a fantasy comedy drama Japanese film directed by Toshiro Goto and released in 2006 by VAP. It is part of the Akihabara Trilogy of films revolving around the Akihabara cosplay and otaku subcultures. It was distributed in the United States by Asia Pulp Cinema.

== Plot ==
Ryōta, a collector of model figures, receives a box with doll parts from a mysterious shop in Akihabara. After assembling and customizing them, the figurine magically turns into real, android-like, woman named Airu. After learning how to speak more naturally, Airu finds a picture of Ryōta's ex-girlfriend Yuria and tries to understand what happened in their past.

== Cast ==
- Hideo Tsubota, as Ryōta
- Yuria Hidaka, as Airu
- Noriko Kijima, as Yuria
