= Akihabara Trilogy =

Japanese film series

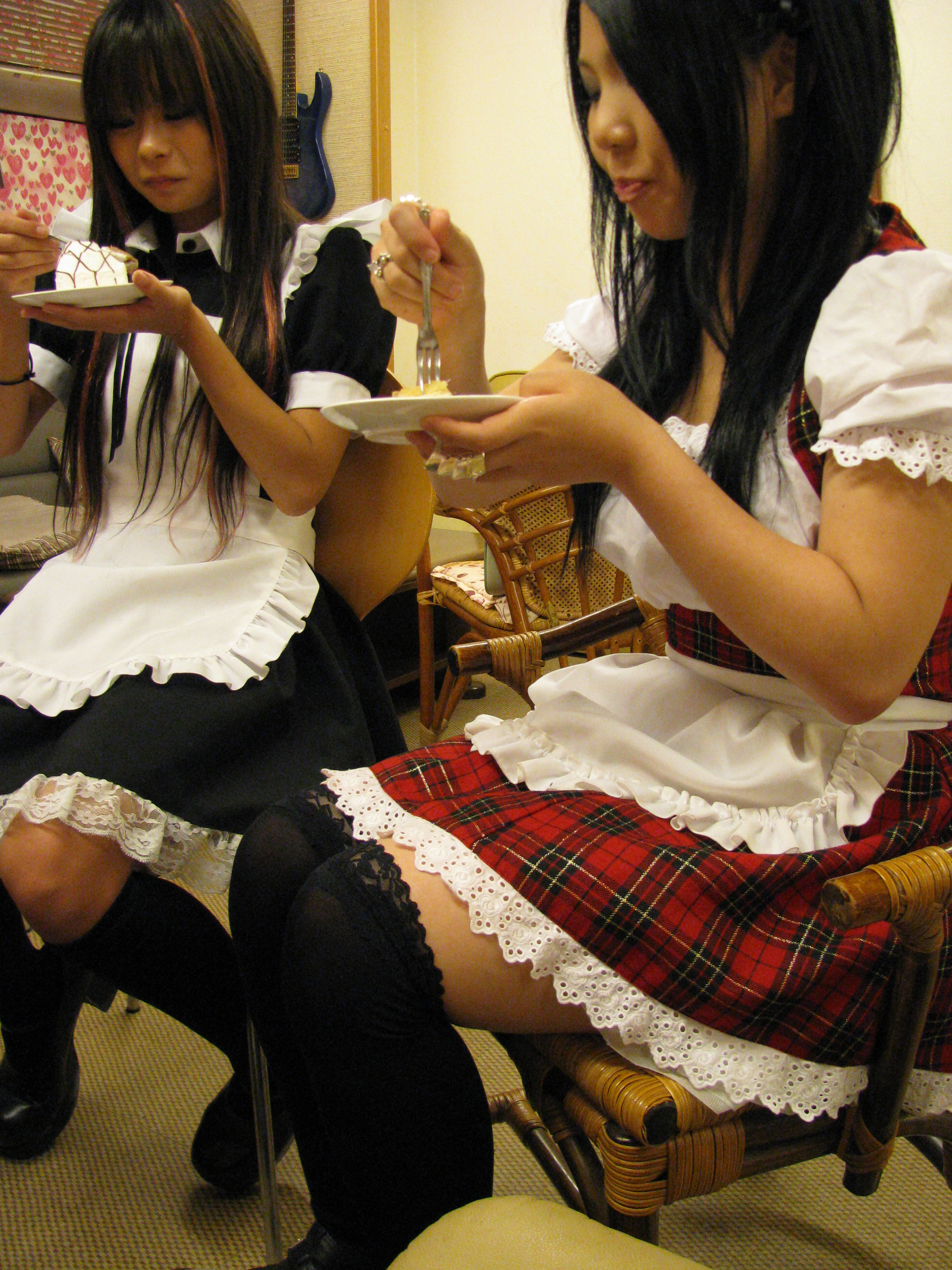
Real-life shops like the pictured maid café inspired the films.

The Akihabara Trilogy (萌えキュン＠MOVIE, Moekyun@Movie) is a series of films set in Akihabara, Tokyo, Japan. The plots of the films revolve around the cosplay and otaku subcultures associated to the location, with themes such as maid cafés and collectible action figures.

The series was produced by VAP, and the distributor Asia Pulp Cinema released the trilogy on DVDs in the United States.

== Movies in the trilogy ==
Original title	Romanization	English title	Director
猫耳少女キキ	Nekomimi Shōjo Kiki	Cat Girl Kiki (2006)	Akiyoshi Sugiura
聖・美少女フィギュア伝	Sei Bishōjo Figyua Den	Legend of the Doll (2006)	Toshiro Goto
恋するメイドカフェ	Koisuru Maid Cafe	Pretty Maid Café (2006)	Akiyoshi Sugiura
