= Maidcore =

Music genre

- Native name: Мейдкор
- Etymology: maid + -core
- Other names: Maid rock
- Stylistic origins: Post-rock; shoegaze; breakcore; chiptune
- Cultural origins: c. 2013 —: Internet culture; Anime and manga fandom; Otaku subculture
- Typical instruments: Electric guitar; Music sampling

Regional scenes
- Runet

Itai the Maid - Solace
An example of maidcore, from the first track of Itai the Maid's 2022 album III

Maidcore (Russian: Мейдкор, Japanese: メイドコア), also known as maid rock, is an underground, Internet-based fusion-microgenre and online music community aesthetically defined by the artists' idiosyncratic musical personas: French maid-styled bishōjo original characters, some of them originating from Futaba Channel in the early 2000s, typically carrying the identifying title 'the Maid'. Popularized on the Runet website VK.com, the music genre and subculture are influenced by the otaku subculture, anime and manga fandom and internet culture. Stylistically, maidcore is an eclectic blend of post-rock, shoegaze, breakcore, and chiptune, featuring music sampling.

== History and etymology ==
The Nijiura maids (Japanese: 虹裏メイド) are original characters created c. 2001 by anonymous users on the Japanese imageboard Futaba Channel (colloquially 2chan), from the eponymous 'Nijiura' (虹裏, lit. 'back of the rainbow') board. The maids are bishōjo characters in French maid outfits, inspired by the maid cafe scene from Japan. There were initially 15 maid characters, each with a particular theme or moe anthropomorphism.

The maidcore community stems from a 2chan-derivative Russian imageboard 'omichan'. In 2004, the nascent community adopted the Nijiura maids as image macros for trolling. The Nijiura maids increasingly became community mascots of their own, and the cast expanded with new original characters. The foundational artist of the scene is held to be Yakui the Maid, who released their first music under the moniker of one of the Nijiura maids in 2013 on Vkontakte. Other artists in the online music community followed the format, claiming or inventing a 'maidsona' as a musical persona, along with the emblematic title of 'the Maid'. Yakui later claimed that they used the Nijiura maid persona for their first 2013 on a whim, utilizing a pre-existing account.

Yakui the Maid and Russian artist Ozoi the Maid coined the name 'maidcore' in a 2014 EP, Regressive Maidcore, from the Internet slang '-core' suffix. A later landmark collaboration between the two was the 2016 EP Wonderland, which incorporated scream vocals.

== Description ==
Album art for the 2026 EP No Hostages by Nunjy the Maid, featuring Touhou Project character Sakuya Izayoi

Maidcore music is an eclectic fusion genre. The most common element is metal-influenced guitar paired with fast beats typical of breakcore, and samples of chiptune. Other genre influences including shoegaze, witch house, and anime song. Yakui the Maid identified Russian thall artist Nemertines as being a frequent comparison to their work.

Many maidcore artists are solo bedroom producers that largely produce instrumental work using digital audio workstations. Lyrical works tend to feature female vocals or Vocaloid software to maintain the 'maidsona' artist persona.

Many maidcore projects have a depressive, wistful audiovisual tone, informed by life in Russia under Vladimir Putin, the "doomer" mentality, and the otaku subculture. Nijiura maids are frequently depicted coping by smoking and using drugs, coupled with psychedelic art motifs.

== See also ==
- Band-Maid
- Internet aesthetic
- Kawaii metal
- Menhera
- Nintendocore
- Outsider art
- Sovietwave
- Vaporwave
- Omsk bird
