= Sumomomo, Momomo =

Japanese manga series

- Sumomomo, Momomo: The Strongest Bride on Earth
- Cover of the 11th tankōbon volume

すもももももも〜地上最強のヨメ〜 (Sumomomo Momomo Chijō Saikyō no Yome)
- Genre: Martial arts; Romantic comedy
- Manga
- Written by: Shinobu Ohtaka
- Published by: Square Enix
- English publisher: US: Yen Press
- Magazine: Gangan YG (2004); Young Gangan (2004–2009)
- English magazine: US: Yen Plus
- Original run: January 30, 2004 – February 6, 2009
- Volumes: 12
- Anime television series
- Directed by: Nobuaki Nakanishi
- Written by: Toshiki Inoue
- Studio: Studio Hibari
- Original network: TV Asahi
- Original run: October 6, 2006 – March 16, 2007
- Episodes: 22 + 2 OVAs
- icon

Sumomomo, Momomo: The Strongest Bride on Earth (Japanese: すもももももも〜地上最強のヨメ〜, Hepburn: Sumomomo Momomo Chijō Saikyō no Yome) is a Japanese manga series written and illustrated by Shinobu Ohtaka. It was serialized in Square Enix's seinen manga magazine Young Gangan (first named Gangan YG) from January 2004 to February 2009, with its chapters collected in 12 tankōbon volumes. The manga was licensed for English release in North America by Yen Press. The story centers on Momoko Kuzuryū, a young and strong martial artist girl who wants to marry and bear a child with a boy that she believes to be a strong fighter.

A 22-episode anime television series adaptation by Studio Hibari was broadcast on TV Asahi from October 2006 to March 2007, with two additional original video animation (OVA) episodes released in August 2007.

== Plot ==
Kōshi Inuzuka is a normal high school student aspiring to become a prosecutor after graduating. One day, a strange girl named Momoko Kuzuryū approaches him, revealing that they are betrothed and expected to produce a strong child together, although Kōshi does not accept this odd notion. Apparently the betrothal resulted from Kōshi's and Momoko's fathers having arranged the marriage. After Kōshi and Momoko's initial meeting, Kōshi realizes that Momoko is not just a normal — albeit strange — girl, as she has been trained by her father in a special form of martial arts known only to twelve families in all of Japan. Each of these twelve families correlates with one of the twelve animals of the Chinese zodiac. Momoko's family is associated with the Dragon, while Kōshi's family is associated with the Dog. The Dragon family is the head of the six families of the west, whereas the Dog family is the head of the six families of the east.

Before long, it is revealed to Kōshi and Momoko that five of the six western families are out on a plot to assassinate Kōshi to prevent him from marrying Momoko, which would cement the twelve families together by bonds of blood. This assassination would be the start of a martial artist war, which would be the seventh such war of the twelve zodiac Masters of Japan. Kōshi must now fight for his life as Momoko protects him, hoping he will return her affection.

== Characters ==
Main characters (from left to right): Tenka, Sanae, Kōshi, Momoko, Iroha, and Hanzō

Kōshi Inuzuka (犬塚 孝士, Inuzuka Kōshi)
Voiced by: Hiroki Takahashi
Kōshi is a studious but physically frail seventeen-year-old high school student, the son of Unken Inuzuka, a martial arts master from one of Japan's twelve zodiac families, associated with the Dog of the Chinese zodiac. Despite his lineage, he rejects martial arts due to childhood trauma involving bullies, which left him prone to freezing when confronted with violence. Aspiring to become a prosecutor, he immerses himself in legal studies, often citing laws to deter aggressors. Initially reluctant to engage with Momoko or the martial arts conflict around him, he gradually overcomes his fears and grows closer to her.
Momoko Kuzuryū (九頭竜 もも子, Kuzuryū Momoko)
Voiced by: Yui Kano
Momoko is a highly skilled but eccentric and energetic young martial artist, specializing in a unique fighting style exclusive to Japan's twelve zodiac Masters, with her lineage tied to the Dragon. She believes marrying Kōshi will produce a powerful heir, as her family's techniques are harder to master as a woman. Initially, their dynamic resembles that of a dog and its master, with Momoko relentlessly pursuing his approval. Despite her usual barefootedness, she wears shoes Kōshi gives her, though she discards them in combat. Fiercely devoted, she protects him from assassins with exceptional skill and unwavering determination, willing to sacrifice herself for his sake.
Iroha Miyamoto (巳屋本 いろは, Miyamoto Iroha)
Voiced by: Ui Miyazaki
Iroha, a fifteen-year-old from the zodiac Master family linked to the Snake, seeks to restore her family's former notoriety as the most feared of the twelve lineages. Her father's leniency weakened their once-powerful yakuza group, the Miyamoto family, leaving only her and her subordinate Hanzō to pursue its revival. Initially targeting Kōshi for assassination, she is thwarted by Momoko. However, after Momoko commends her strength and questions her path, Iroha abandons vengeance, develops feelings for Kōshi, and befriends Momoko. She later supports Momoko's relationship with Kōshi while seeking a new future for her family.
Sanae Nakajima (中慈馬 早苗, Nakajima Sanae)
Voiced by: Aya Hirano
Sanae is a high school student and class representative, secretly operating as Tenchū Senshi Uma Kamen ("Divine Punishment Warrior Horse Mask"), a superheroine tasked with protecting Kōshi. As a descendant of the Horse zodiac Masters, she wields a power-enhancing outfit that grows stronger with less coverage—maximizing its effect when wearing only the boots, ideal for her family's kick-based combat style. Though she harbors unrequited feelings for Kōshi, she suppresses them, believing her duty is to guard him discreetly while supporting his bond with Momoko. Despite her inner conflict, she remains a loyal friend, often tending to Momoko's injuries and accepting her role as "a flower in the shadow".
Hanzō (半蔵)
Voiced by: Chihiro Suzuki
Hanzō, a seventeen-year-old loyal follower of Iroha, assists in her mission to eliminate Kōshi out of unwavering devotion after she once saved his life. As the sole remaining member of her family's formerly powerful yakuza organization, he deeply admires Iroha and strives to better himself through her example. Their relationship mirrors that of a Dog and its master, though Iroha openly regards him as a brother and rejects any romantic possibility, despite Hanzō's apparent feelings for her. His loyalty remains steadfast regardless of her dismissal of his affections.
Tenka Koganei (虎金井 天下, Koganei Tenka)
Voiced by: Takeshi Kusao
Tenka, a member of the Tiger zodiac Master family, initially attempts to assassinate Kōshi while displaying feline-like traits including aquaphobia and a fondness for round objects. He carries a soccer ball named "Becky" (ベッキー, Bekkī) that appears to converse with him, though observers attribute this to ventriloquism. Having developed childhood feelings for Momoko after defeating her in training, he mistakenly believed they would marry when reunited, while she anticipated a deadly rematch. Ultimately abandoning his mission, Tenka warns Momoko about impending attacks from his relatives and allies with her and Kōshi. By the story's conclusion, he maintains friendly relations with the group.
Unken Inuzuka (犬塚 雲軒, Inuzuka Unken)
Voiced by: Tesshō Genda
Unken, Kōshi's father and head of the Dog zodiac Master family, is a martial arts master who struggles to convince his son to follow his path. Despite their differences, he maintains a friendly rivalry with Sendayū. Though now distinct in appearance, an old school photo reveals he once resembled Kōshi closely—a fact that unsettles his son. Unken remains determined to pass on his legacy, even as Kōshi resists martial arts training.
Sendayū Kuzuryū (九頭竜 千太夫, Kuzuryū Sendayū)
Voiced by: Katsuhisa Hōki
Sendayū, Momoko's father and a martial arts master, instructs his daughter to marry the strongest warrior and produce a powerful heir, as their family's techniques cannot be fully mastered by women. This directive motivates Momoko's pursuit of Kōshi, despite his initial reluctance toward martial arts.
Katsuyuki Saigō (西郷 勝行, Saigō Katsuyuki)
Voiced by: Taketoshi Kawano
Saigō is a hulking, intimidating student at Kōshi's school who leads a group of delinquents. Despite his rough exterior—communicating mostly through grunts while wearing sunglasses—he secretly enjoys caring for kittens and reading romance novels. When he first encounters Alice Uzuki, he fearlessly defends her from assassins and later shields Kōshi from her weapon. Smitten with Alice, he enlists Momoko and others to help pursue a relationship with her. His actions reveal a gentle nature beneath his fearsome appearance.
Inaho Kameda (亀田 稲穂, Kameda Inaho)
Voiced by: Kikuko Inoue
Inaho, representing the turtle-associated Kameda family, seeks to supplant the Nakajima family as protectors of the Inuzuka lineage. Though disliking legal studies, she becomes a teacher to approach Kōshi romantically. As "Kame Kamen" (Turtle Mask), she wears a revealing armored costume resembling a turtle shell. After failing to seduce Kōshi, she attempts to kidnap him but ultimately abandons her scheme when confronted by Sanae's resolve. Despite developing genuine affection for Kōshi, her advances are rejected due to the unethical teacher-student dynamic. The Kameda family's turtle motif makes them unique among the zodiac lineages. She is an anime-exclusive character.
Alice Uzuki (卯月 アリス, Uzuki Arisu)
Voiced by: Mi-ko
Alice, from the Rabbit-aligned Uzuki clan, is a skilled assassin who rebels to pursue music. Recognizable by her combat hairstyle resembling rabbit ears, she befriends Saigō but faces blackmail when her clan demands she kill Kōshi or see Saigō executed. Though nearly successful, Saigō intervenes, convincing her through Momoko that her talents belong to music, not violence. With help from the group, Alice escapes her clan's influence and departs for France to study music professionally. She is an anime-exclusive character.

== Media ==
=== Manga ===
Written and illustrated by Shinobu Ohtaka, Sumomomo, Momomo started in the inaugural issue of Square Enix's seinen manga magazine Gangan YG on January 30, 2004; the magazine was later rebranded as Young Gangan on December 3 of the same year. The series finished on February 6, 2009. Square Enix collected its chapters in twelve tankōbon volumes, released from May 5, 2005, to February 25, 2009.

The manga has been licensed by Yen Press for distribution in English in North America. The manga was initially serialized in Yen Press' Yen Plus anthology magazine, the first issue of which went on sale on July 29, 2008. The twelve collected volumes were released from May 12, 2009, to May 29, 2012.

==== Volumes ====
No.	Original release date	Original ISBN	English release date	English ISBN
1	May 5, 2005	978-475751-444-7	May 12, 2009	978-075953-004-1
2	August 25, 2005	978-475751-509-3	October 27, 2009	978-075953-045-4
3	October 25, 2005	978-475751-554-3	March 23, 2010	978-075953-089-8
4	April 25, 2006	978-475751-673-1	June 15, 2010	978-075953-114-7
5	April 25, 2006	978-475751-779-0	August 17, 2010	978-031607-314-1
6	December 25, 2006	978-475751-834-6	November 30, 2010	978-031607-317-2
7	March 24, 2007	978-475751-940-4	February 22, 2011	978-031607-318-9
8	August 25, 2007	978-475752-085-1	May 31, 2011	978-031607-319-6
9	December 25, 2007	978-475752-183-4	August 16, 2011	978-031607-320-2
10	June 25, 2008	978-475752-314-2	November 22, 2011	978-031607-321-9
11	September 25, 2008	978-475752-384-5	March 6, 2012	978-031620-469-9
12	February 25, 2009	978-475752-496-5	May 29, 2012	978-031620-470-5

=== Anime ===
A twenty-two episode anime television series adaptation, animated by Studio Hibari and directed by Nobuaki Nakanishi, was broadcast on TV Asahi from October 6, 2006, to March 16, 2007. Two additional original video animation (OVA) episodes were released with the ninth DVD set of the series on August 24, 2007. The two opening theme songs, "Saikyō○×Keikaku" (最強○×計画) (episodes 1–12) and "Setsujō! Hyakka Ryōran" (切情! 佰火繚乱) (episodes 13–24), were performed by Mosaic.wav. The first ending theme song is "No Rock No Life" (episodes 1–12) by Honey Bee; the second ending theme song is "Mōsō Break" (妄想ブレイク, Mōsō Bureiku) (episodes 13–14, 16–22) by Yozora Orihime & AiAi; the ending theme song for episode 15 is "Good Luck" by Mi-ko.

==== Episodes ====
No.	Title	Original release date
1	"The Strongest Fiancé on Earth"; Transliteration: "Chijō Saikyō no Iinazuke" (Japanese: 地上最強の許婚)	October 6, 2006
Momoko, a strange girl skilled in the martial arts, locates Kōshi Inuzuka and wants to marry him in order to produce a strong child.
2	"Natural Exploding Girl"; Transliteration: "Tennen Bakunetsu Shōjo" (Japanese: 天然爆熱少女)	October 13, 2006
Momoko joins Kōshi's class, much to his surprise. The gym leader, jealous of Kōshi's popularity with a lot of the female students, challenges Momoko to athletic contests with Kōshi's credit in the class on the line.
3	"Caught in the Zoo"; Transliteration: "Dōbutsuen de Tsukamaete" (Japanese: 動物園でつかまえて)	October 20, 2006
Kōshi and Momoko go to the zoo together, though before long, animals escape their cages and a massive polar bear attacks them. All of this is a plot by Iroha to kill Kōshi.
4	"The Immoral Assassination Plot"; Transliteration: "Jingi Naki Ansatsu Keikaku" (Japanese: 仁義なき暗殺計画)	October 27, 2006
Iroha tries repeatedly to assassinate Kōshi, but upon developing a crush on him, she is unable to go through with it.
5	"Clash! Momoko VS Iroha"; Transliteration: "Gekitotsu! Momoko VS Iroha" (Japanese: 激突! もも子VSいろは)	November 3, 2006
Iroha tries once again to kill Kōshi but gets caught up in the moment when Kōshi and Momoko are showing her around the park. Eventually, Hanzō has to step in to try to complete the mission.
6	"The Tiger Assassin, Appears!"; Transliteration: "Tora no Shikaku, Arawaru!" (Japanese: 虎の刺客、現る!)	November 10, 2006
Tenka Koganei of the Tiger family comes to assassinate Kōshi, but ends up in a fight to the death for Momoko's affection.
7	"The Invisible Link"; Transliteration: "Mienai Kizuna" (Japanese: 見えない絆)	November 17, 2006
After learning about the meaning between their marriage from his father, Kōshi starts to act nicer towards Momoko though soon worries about being manipulated and distances himself from her. Eventually, Kōshi realizes how much he has hurt her and tries to rectify for his actions.
8	"The Underclassman Who Calls Upon Storms"; Transliteration: "Arashi o Yobu Kōhai" (Japanese: 嵐を呼ぶ後輩)	November 24, 2006
Iroha and Hanzō join Kōshi's school and instantly Iroha notices how friendly he and Sanae are to each other. Iroha proceeds to help Momoko convey her feelings more strongly to Kōshi.
9	"The Heroine of Tragic Love"; Transliteration: "Hiren no Hīrō Onna" (Japanese: 悲恋のヒーロー女)	December 1, 2006
Sanae, as a member of the Horse family of the zodiac Masters, is bound to protect Kōshi from danger without revealing herself to anyone. She is constantly battling the feelings she has for him.
10	"Sanae's Fiancé Appears"; Transliteration: "Sanae no Iinazuke Arawaru" (Japanese: 早苗の許嫁現る)	December 8, 2006
Sanae's fiancé tries to prove to her through various strength tests to show her that he is worthy of becoming her husband. Meanwhile, Sanae is having enough trouble just keeping her martial arts background a secret from Kōshi.
11	"Heaven's Punishment Warrior Horse Mask, Arrives"; Transliteration: "Tenchū Senshi Uma Kamen, Sanjō" (Japanese: 天誅戦士ウマ仮面、参上)	December 15, 2006
When Hikaru, Sanae's supposed fiancé, comes looking for a duel with Kōshi at school, Sanae must endure intense embarrassment in order to save him.
12	"The Day of a Cold, Hanzō's Situation"; Transliteration: "Kaze no Hi, Hanzō no Baai" (Japanese: 風邪の日、半蔵の場合)	December 22, 2006
Both Kōshi and Hanzō come down with a cold, though Hanzō is almost completely ignored by Iroha in favor of Kōshi. Hanzō gets very jealous of Kōshi and starts tormenting him by impersonating him and others in order to harm Kōshi.
13	"Confrontation of Rivals! The Horse and the Tortoise"; Transliteration: "Raibaru Taiketsu! Uma to Kame" (Japanese: ライバル対決! ウマとカメ)	January 12, 2007
A new female teacher has been hired at Kōshi's school who is very well-endowed and knowledgeable about the law. Before long, Sanae begins to suspect her of being an assassin and attempts to confirm her suspicions.
14	"The Love Chaos in the Haunted House"; Transliteration: "Obakeyashiki no Koi Sōdō" (Japanese: お化け屋敷の恋騒動)	January 19, 2007
A girl, thought to be dead due to an accident at the school's cultural festival decades previous, has resurfaced. It is rumored that she died before she got a chance to confess her love to Kōshi's father. Kōshi hence agrees to date the girl so that she can peacefully rest in heaven.
15	"Saigō's Love"; Transliteration: "Saigō no Koi" (Japanese: 西郷の恋)	January 26, 2007
Saigō meets the girl of his dreams after he thought he protected her from thugs. The girl is actually a martial artist coming from a tribe known for training assassins. The girl is given a choice: Kill Kōshi, or Saigō will be killed.
16	"How to Destroy a Fatigue Period"; Transliteration: "Kentaiki no Kowashikata" (Japanese: 倦怠期の壊し方)	February 2, 2007
Momoko gets some advice from a television program about how to make Kōshi notice her more, but her initial attempts fail. Iroha and Hanzō try to help out as well, but with not much success. At the end of the episode, Momoko and Kōshi find a disheveled Tenka.
17	"Fierce Fight! The Tiger Brothers"; Transliteration: "Gekitō! Tora no Kyōdai" (Japanese: 激闘! 虎の兄弟)	February 9, 2007
Tenka is taken back to Kōshi's house where he is given nourishment. He informs Kōshi and Momoko that his siblings are coming to kill Kōshi. Tenka's younger brother arrives to try to assassinate Kōshi, and Tenka attempts to stop him.
18	"A Welcome Party with Yaminabe!?"; Transliteration: "Yaminabe de Kangeikai!?" (Japanese: ヤミ鍋で歓迎会!?)	February 16, 2007
Kōshi's house has burned down and he must now move into the same apartment building as Iroha and Hanzō; Tenka lives there too. As a welcoming party, the landlady hosts a special welcoming party involving nabemono.
19	"The Housekeeper Came!"; Transliteration: "Kaseifu ga Kita!" (Japanese: 家政婦が来た!)	February 23, 2007
A woman claiming to have been fired from being employed as a maid arrives at the apartment building. where Kōshi is currently staying. She initially comes off as a kind and helpful person but soon reveals to Momoko that she is an assassin who has come to kill Kōshi. Momoko tries to plead her case to the others, but no one will believe her.
20	"Together with Fate..."; Transliteration: "Unmei o Tomo ni..." (Japanese: 運命を共に…)	March 2, 2007
Kōshi was made to swallow a ball of poison from the Tenga clan and was told that in a week he will die unless he is given an antidote. Momoko willingly swallows the same poison so that if Kōshi dies, she does as well. Momoko and the other martial artists on their side train for a week, and Kōshi tries to learn a technique of his own, but fails. Kōshi and the others then go to the Tenga clan's main house and must fight several battles to gain the antidote.
21	"Respective Thoughts..."; Transliteration: "Sorezore no Omoi..." (Japanese: それぞれの思い…)	March 9, 2007
With the first battle won, Iroha and Hanzō face up against Tenten in the second match. After a little while, Tenten starts to tease Iroha by revealing to Kōshi and Momoko that Iroha is in love with Kōshi. This in effect makes her enraged to the point where she cannot battle properly and is defeated. Hanzō tries to turn things around which gives Iroha the last bit of strength she needed to give one last powerful attack, though Tenten easily countered it leaving Momoko to intercept Tenten's last attack before it hit Iroha. It turns out Tenten is in love with Hanzō, though does not reveal this. Instead, she gives up her portion of the antidote and walks off. This leaves Kōshi and Momoko to go on ahead to the final battle.
22	"To the Usual Days"; Transliteration: "Itsumo no Hibi e" (Japanese: いつもの日々へ)	March 16, 2007
With Kōshi and Momoko poisoned, they have to still battle Tenga Koganei in order to get the antidote, but the sun is close to setting, which means death for Kōshi and Momoko. Upon entering battle, Momoko finds that Tenga is much more powerful than she expected and before long the battle is all but over. When Momoko cannot fight any longer, Tenga gives the antidote to Kōshi, though there is only enough for one person. Right before the sun sets, Kōshi gives Momoko the antidote, and after she awakens to find Kōshi dead, unleashes her ultimate fury on Tenga, and wins the battle. Afterwards, it is found that Kōshi was miraculously healed due to a martial arts technique his mother had performed on him when he was young. Everyone goes back to living their "normal" lives.
23	"Hot Spring Battle (OVA DVD)"; Transliteration: "Onsen Dokusen Rabu Gassen" (Japanese: 温泉 独占 ラブ合戦)	August 24, 2007
There is a Monopoly Love Battle in a Hot Spring.
24	"Kidnapped Koushi! (OVA DVD)"; Transliteration: "Sarawareta Kōshi!" (Japanese: さらわれた孝士!)	August 24, 2007
Koushi is kidnapped.
