= Yui Kano =

Japanese voice actress (born 1983)

Yui Kano (鹿野優以, Kano Yui; born December 22, 1983) is a Japanese voice actress from Sumida, Tokyo, Japan. She currently works for Aoni Production. She also starred in the live-action film Cat Girl Kiki.

== Anime cast in ==
- Ayakashi ~ Japanese Classic Horror as Wominaheshi (Tenshu Monogatari)
- Chrome Shelled Regios as Dalshena Che Matelna
- Claymore as Carla
- D.C.S.S. ~Da Capo Second Season~ as Female Student
- Gintama as Eromes
- Glass Mask as Official (ep 23)
- Gosick as Cecile Lafitte
- Himawari! as Momota
- Kamisama Kazoku as Female student (ep 1); Nurse (ep 6)
- Lucky Star as Hikage Miyakawa
- Nabari no Ou as Kazuho Amatatsu
- One Piece as Ban Dedessinée, Ishilly, Chao, Lady Tree, Charlotte Marnier, Charlotte Custard and Charlotte Fuyumeg
- Peach Girl as female student A (ep 21)
- Queen's Blade as Irma
- Rune Factory Frontier as Rosetta
- Sumomomo Momomo as Momoko Kuzuryu
- Transformers: Kiss Players as Shāoshāo Lǐ
- Valkyria Chronicles as Edy Nelson; Anisette Nelson; Ramsey Clement
- Wagaya no Oinari-sama as Sakura Misaki
- Yume Tsukai as Megumi Hamachi (ep 4)

== Video Games cast in ==
- Deardrops as Kaguya Riho
