= French maid =

Stock character and costume

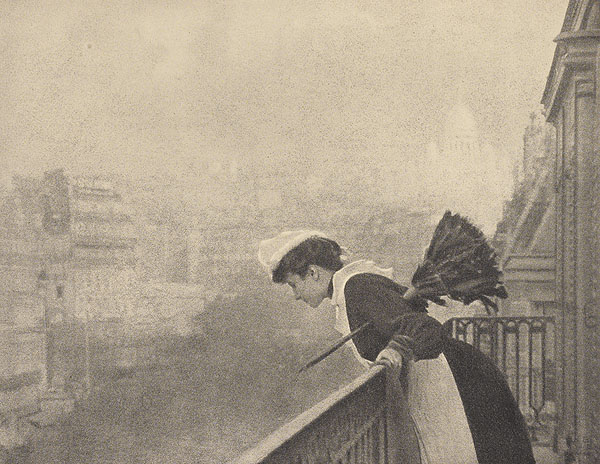
1906 photo of a housemaid in Montmartre, Paris, by Constant Puyo

French maid is a term first applied in the Victorian and early 20th-century periods to a lady's maid of French nationality. A lady's maid was a senior servant who reported directly to the lady of the house, and accompanied her mistress on travel. She helped her mistress with her appearance, including make-up, hairdressing, clothing, jewellery, and shoes, and sometimes served as confidante. A French maid was considered likely to be more expert in fashion, and was also able to apply her knowledge of the French language when travelling in Europe.

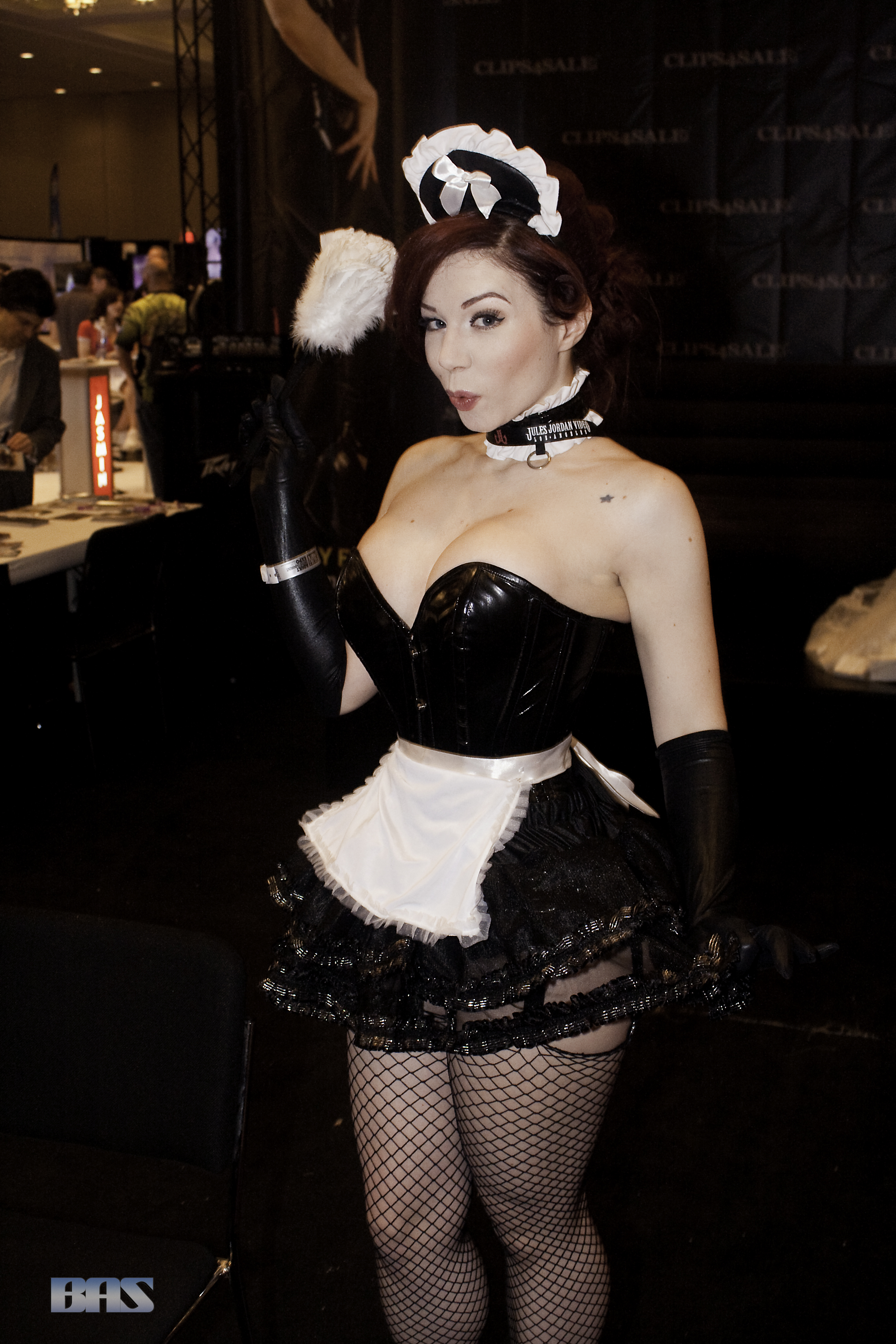
Two common interpretations of the maid outfit: erotic (left) and moe (right).

Erotic fantasies revolving around young French women later led to the appearance of French maids as desirable and stereotypical soubrette characters in burlesque dramas and bedroom farces. This stock character was a flirtatious, cheeky, and saucy figure.

The term French maid is often applied to an eroticised and strongly modified style of servant's dress that evolved from typical housemaid's black-and-white afternoon uniforms of 19th-century France, despite a housemaid being junior to a lady's maid. Some styles are conservative while others are revealing. The French maid costume is often used in cosplay, sexual roleplaying, and uniform fetishism. Depending on design details, some forms can be classified as lingerie.

In the anime and manga fandom, and especially among otaku, maid outfits are considered to be moe. In the 21st century, restaurants known as "maid cafés" have been opened in Japan and other countries to appeal to the aforementioned moe aesthetic.

== Costume ==
Though not strict to historically accurate uniforms, the French maid outfit has an easily recognizable pattern and black-and white theme that remains the template for other forms of the costume.

The typical French maid costume includes:

- A black dress with white trim, with a full skirt at or above knee length
- White half-apron, usually with ruffle or lace
- A ruffled or lace headpiece or a bonnet
- Tights or stockings
- High heels, usually black
- A feather duster
- White or black lace garter

Optional accessories depend on design and context:

- Choker necklace
- Other cleaning equipment

== In popular media ==
- The Cigarette Girls in Ninotchka (1939)
- Madeline in Please Turn Over (1959)
- The French Maid in The Ladies Man (1961)
- Babbette in Scavenger Hunt (1979)
- Yvette Carte-Blanche, Maria Recamier, and Mimi Labonq in 'Allo 'Allo! (1982–1992)
- Yvette in Clue (1985)
- The Featherduster in Beauty and the Beast (1991) and Babette in its musical Beauty and the Beast (1994)
- Louise in 8 Women (2002)

== See also ==
- Band-Maid
- Cosplay restaurant
- Maid café
- Maidcore
