= Akiyoshi Sugiura =

Japanese film director

Akiyoshi Sugiura (杉浦 昭嘉, Sugiura Akiyoshi) is a Japanese film director. He was the movie-maker of two films featured in the Akihabara Trilogy.

== Filmography ==
- Pretty Maid Café
- Cat Girl Kiki
