= Kyōran Kazoku Nikki =

Japanese light novel series

- Cover of the first Kyōran Kazoku Nikki light novel

狂乱家族日記 (The Diary of a Crazed Family)
- Genre: Romantic comedy, science fiction
- Light novel
- Written by: Akira
- Illustrated by: x6suke
- Published by: Enterbrain
- Imprint: Famitsu Bunko
- Original run: June 1, 2005 – July 30, 2011
- Volumes: 24
- Manga
- Written by: Eshika
- Illustrated by: Shogo
- Published by: Enterbrain
- Magazine: FB Online
- Original run: 2007 – 2010
- Volumes: 4
- Anime television series
- Directed by: Yasuhiro Kuroda
- Produced by: Tetsurō Satomi; Takayuki Nagatani; Tatsuya Ono; Kenta Suzuki; Yūichi Matsunaga; Kensuke Kido
- Written by: Mamiko Ikeda
- Music by: Tomoki Kikuya
- Studio: Nomad
- Original network: AT-X, TVQ, tvk, CTC, TSS, THK, TVS, TVO
- Original run: April 12, 2008 – October 4, 2008
- Episodes: 26

Kyōran Kazoku Nikki (狂乱家族日記, The Diary of a Crazed Family) is a light novel series by Akira (日日日), with illustrations by x6suke. A 26-episode anime adaptation was broadcast in 2008.

== Plot summary ==
A thousand years ago, Enka (閻禍), the god of destruction, died saying that its "child" would destroy the world. In order to prevent this, the Great Japanese Empire Paranormal Phenomena Bureau of Measures begins "Operation Cozy Family" (なごやか家族作戦, Nagoyaka Kazoku Sakusen) (code name: "code-Olympus"). The family is composed of Ōka Midarezaki, an official of the Bureau, and Kyōka Midarezaki, a self-proclaimed goddess, as parents; the children, human and otherwise, are the candidates – all potentially the prophesied "Child of Enka". The goal of the operation is to discern which child the prophecy applies to, as well as to teach him or her about the love of family in hopes of convincing him or her to not destroy the world. The story focuses on the mishaps and adventures that the ad hoc family experiences together.

== Characters ==
=== Midarezaki family ===
Kyōka Midarezaki (乱崎 凶華, Midarezaki Kyōka)

Voiced by: Ayumi Fujimura

The Midarezaki family "mother". She is 20 years old, however, she has an appearance of a young girl with cat ears and a tail. Her real name is 'Kyoukya Eaeriaea (キョウキァ=エアエリアエア)', and she used to be worshiped by the people of an underground kingdom named 'Shangri-la', however, she ran away because she felt something was missing from her life. She is from a race of demons that uses other people's bodies as theirs, and that she used to be their queen before deciding to abandon her people and live as a human with gorgeous black hair, deep green eyes, and as tall as Ōka. However, because her secret cannot be discovered, her memories as a demon were erased. Her name as the demon queen was 'Vanessa'. Due to her past of being worshiped, she has a very arrogant and destructive nature, but despite her personality, she actually cares about her family and is trying to do her best as Ōka's wife and loves him dearly, getting very jealous when she found out Ōka went out with another woman and tries to have a husband and wife relationship (sadly she gets all her ideas from manga and soap operas, leading to embarrassing situations for Ōka). At the end she is last seen heading back to Shangri-la to find out who she was, leaving many of her mini-dolls with her family for company. She has an ability named 'Keitai Denwa (携帯電話; lit. cell phone), which allows her to manipulate a person's mind or to control a set of mini-dolls that help her when necessary (in the fifth episode of the anime, she also uses this ability to communicate telepathically with Yūka). She is also a very bad cook (where in episode 15 after making an anniversary cake there was bullet holes, voodoo dolls and knives into the wall), where her meals frighten everyone in the family (giving an ominous glow to the food or bringing it to life) and has a strange habit of naming certain people around her with weird names, stating that they should be proud of a name given to them by a god. Ironically, even though she is the mother of the family, she is also the shortest member as well (except when Gekka is in her jellyfish form).

Ōka Midarezaki (乱崎 凰火, Midarezaki Ōka)

Voiced by: Takayuki Kondo

The main protagonist and the father, who is forced to participate in Cozy Family Operation. Though sensible and collected, he is often teased and mocked by Kyōka. He lost his parents at the age of three, and has no memory before then. He is also the head of the operations department of 'Supernatural Phenomenon Treatment Bureau' (超常現象対策局, Chōjyō Genjō Taisakukyoku). He clearly stated to Kyōka that he is unable to love someone, yet he does treasure the family and likes her (which made her blush). But later in the series, Ōka develops feelings for Kyōka, and realizes what love is really like.

Ginka Midarezaki (乱崎 銀夏, Midarezaki Ginka)

Voiced by: Yoshinori Fujita

The eldest son, aged 23, he enjoys dressing as a female and often speaks in a feminine manner. He also works at local okama bar "Virgo" under the name of "Silver Fox" (ぎんぎつね, Ginkitsune). He was originally a member of a yakuza clan named Kizakura, but ran away when a girl he loved was killed by his family. His original name is Ginichi Kizakura (黄桜 銀一, Kizakura Gin'ichi). He once met Chika in person a long time ago, and made a promise with her which eventually leads her to join the Midarezaki family. After all the "training" Chika has put him through, he has seemed to have developed a liking for pain. He is last seen on a date with Chika, but it is unknown if she finally made him "manly" again.

Yūka Midarezaki (乱崎 優歌, Midarezaki Yūka)

Voiced by: Kana Hanazawa

The nine-year-old eldest daughter (the second daughter after the end of the first book); comes from 'Demon's Family' (鬼の一家, Oni no Ikka) Himemiya, she was continuously abused by her family according to their tradition called "Solitary Doll", especially by her biological sister. The point of Solitary Doll is to beat and abuse the weakest (usually the youngest) member of the family to relieve stress. Despite her past, she has a very calm and gentle personality. Originally named Reiko Himemiya (姫宮 零子, Himemiya Reiko), she now lives her life as an elementary school girl and is friends with a fellow student. This friend, Yamamoto, tries to bribe her with pudding (hinting that it might be her favorite food) to help him with his test. She also has a strong attachment to her father Ōka as she likes it when he compliments her on how cute she looks, with sometimes the first question she asks being, "Do you think Father will think I'm cute in it?". Related to this dependency, she is the one most anxious about Ōka leaving the family – from joining in odd family schemes to drinking all the water in the house to dehydrate an alien who showed romantic interest in Ōka. At the end of the anime she is seen taking her friend Yamaguchi to her house.

Teika Midarezaki (乱崎 帝架, Midarezaki Teika)

Voiced by: Hiroki Yasumoto

The seven-year-old second son of the family, he is a lion, and known as the last link with the "Brown Emperor", able to talk to any animal and even give them orders. He talks in an archaic manner, and he is very proud of himself as a lion. He is also very fond of Yūka who is commonly found riding or cuddling herself on top of him. He usually refers to his siblings as Honorable Sister or Honorable Brother. Since he is described as coming from the savannah on the edge of the Empire, the Greater Japanese Empire in the series appears to dominate most of the planet's Eastern hemisphere. His old friend Madara has a crush on him, but he remained unaware of this for some time because he was too dense to realize that "he" was a "she".

Hyōka Midarezaki (乱崎 雹霞, Midarezaki Hyōka)

Voiced by: Ryō Hirohashi

Three-year-old youngest son is a biological weapon made from the flesh of Enka that bears the name of "The Black Thirteenth" (黒の十三番, Kuro no Jyūsanban). Three years before, he destroyed the laboratory where he was made and ran away, and now suppresses his past memories. According to his creator, he was once also referred to as "Robes". In a speech to Yūka, he tells her that every member of the Midarezaki family is between "heaven and hell", unable to tread in either. He enjoys watching television and seems to be the only one that can eat Kyōka's cooking (probably due to the fact he doesn't have a stomach or taste buds). His brother is dubbed as Dekamelon by Kyōka, almost a green version of Hyōka with a running gag that something happens right before he can say his real name. Hyōka has feelings for Takanashi Kiriko, which are later revealed to be mutual but she doesn't want their relationship to start till after she has "found" herself. It is also revealed that he was friends with Takanashi Yuiko, and accidentally killed her, unaware that she was in one of his shooting targets (deliberately placed there by Dr. Gebok to test his reaction to her death). It is very likely that this incident caused him to destroy the laboratory and is the memory he had suppressed until hearing of her through Kiriko.

Gekka Midarezaki (乱崎 月香, Midarezaki Gekka)

Voiced by: Rina Satō

The 'youngest daughter' of the Midarezaki family. She is a jellyfish, however, she is able to do things that are unusual for a normal jellyfish such as writing letters, changing her body's color according to her feelings or shooting lightning as an attack. The sub-director of Supernatural Phenomenon Treatment Bureau's operation department went fishing, caught her and DNA-tested her for fun, and it turned out that a mere jellyfish actually has Enka's DNA, so she became a member of 'Cozy Family Operation'. Her real name is 'Warave' (ワラビー) and her exact age is unknown (although she mentions having lived for over 1,000 years in the third episode of the anime). She has various other forms which she takes from time to time, such as the giant Kraken who is summoned by speaking her name. Occasionally a dark-haired female with crescent-shaped insignia, dressed in a manner of Heian period, appears in the book, and it is believed by some family members that she is Gekka. This form of her was introduced in the sixth episode of the anime, where she scolds her family for leaving her behind before sending them all home from a deserted island. The family have no recollection of this occurring due to Gekka have wiped their memory. It is later discovered that she is actually the god of the planet Ocean, which, as its name suggests, is an entire planet covered in water. She created a water-like species from her own body because she was the only living being on that planet. She left the planet when Gouyokuou came to her planet wishing for her hand in marriage. At first she turned him down but after he came again she told him she would give him an answer in a thousand years. In the end after stopping Water from destroying her family, she explains that when Gouyokuou first came to her she was scared as he was the first species she met that wasn't made from her and told him she would answer him in 1000 years as a way to run away. However, before she sends Gouyokuou off into space, she agrees that she will marry him.

Chika Midarezaki (乱崎 千花, Midarezaki Chika)

Voiced by: Haruka Tomatsu

The 'eldest daughter' of the Midarezaki family. Formerly known as Senko Himemiya (姫宮 千子, Himemiya Senko), she is Yūka's biological sister and is the last to join the Midarezaki family. She was the former Solitary Doll before Yūka was born. After Yūka became the next Solitary Doll, she tortured her in various ways and even bribed her classmates to bully her. However, she remembered the promise with Ginichi Kizakura, now Ginka Midarezaki, and regrets her wrongdoings. She actually doesn't have Enka's DNA, but she becomes a member of 'Cozy Family Operation' by Kyōka's ability. Now she is constantly found by Ginka's side, whom she has had a crush on since childhood. She is frequently trying to make him manly again via failed attempts to seduce him, and trying to make him act more manly, whether he wants to or not. She calls Kyōka Neko-san. At the moment she lives like a normal high school girl and is the head student (not of her own free will as she beat up, in self-defense, the current head), but even though she tries to avoid her "responsibilities" she cares very dearly for her friends and orchestrates a raid on a yakuza compound to save her friend. She is well endowed and the female cast seem to be jealous (especially Kyōka as she has the body of a child and can't get Ōka's attention). In the end she is last seen on a date with Ginka, but it is unknown if she finally made him manly again.

=== Others ===
Shiruku Kirisaki (aka Grim Reaper III) (霧岬 知紅 (死神 三番), Kirisaki Shiruku (Shinigami Sanban))

Voiced by: Rika Morinaga

An operative of the Supernatural Phenomenon Treatment Bureau along with Ōka, she works as a monster slayer and is the adopted daughter of the Vice head of the bureau. Her real name is Shiruku Kirisaki, gaining the title of Grim Reaper III (but referred to as Grim Reaper for short) after slaying 1000 monsters; wearing a skull mask as proof. It's shown that her face has a large burn around her right eye due to a monster hunting that went bad. She seems to have feelings for Ōka with their similar quality towards their inability to love someone, getting into a fight and nearly killing Kyōka. She first met Ōka after she was brought to the Supernatural Phenomenon Treatment Bureau when a supernatural phenomenon wiped out her village, leaving her as the only survivor. She nearly killed Ōka without mercy if it wasn't for his fast reflexes but soon joined up with a pink haired Grim Reaper (Grim Reaper II). She fights with a katana and talks cheerfully, especially when it's about slaying monsters and makes the sound kuhuhu when giggling. She also seems to go after anyone if by misunderstanding (like when she and her father were naked after turning back into humans and she chased him shouting "hentai"). In the end it seems that she and her father were fired, as they are both looking through garbage cans for food.

Akeru Nishikura (西倉 明, Nishikura Akeru)

Voiced by: Eri Kitamura

A young person whose gender is never disclosed in the light novels, but gets addressed as a male in the anime. He is better known by the name Pierre, which he has been dubbed by Kyōka. First seen in episode 5, he runs a 5-star hotel in the middle of an uninhabited island. Ōka was easily able to tell that the hotel was created by the Bureau and Pierre is actually an agent, as Pierre confirmed that he is from the 2nd Research Department and accepted this mission since he believed that he was only slowing the research team down with his presence. He thanks Kyoka for the chance of actually being useful (and thankful for the nickname, so far being the only character that has enjoyed the name given to them by Kyōka). He also occasionally cooks delicious meals and takes one of the monkeys from the island as his bodyguard. He has a habit of getting easily nervous and trips over nothing.

Dr. Gebok (ドクター·ゲボック, Doctor Gebokku)

Voiced by: Shinji Kawada

A recurring villain. He was one of the original scientists that worked on Black Thirteen, but he was killed when Hyōka destroyed the lab and made his escape. Dr. Gebok came back to life with the help of technology. His new body is mainly wires, a drill for a right hand, clamp on the left and a helmet. He is currently trying to get Black Thirteen back to his side so he could further study him. While Black Thirteen was still under study, Dr. Gebok tricked Hyōka into accidentally killing his only friend, who turned out to be the older sister to Kiriko. This is most likely what led Hyōka to destroy the lab. After losing his valuable research subject, Dr. Gebok created a drug that turns humans into animals, and repeatedly launched attacks on the Cozy Family with the hope that they will give Hyōka back to him. In the end it appears that he has all but given up on trying to attack the family and now is a regular visitor to Virgo.

Gen'ichirō Hanayama (花山 厳一郎, Hanayama Gen'ichirō)

Voiced by: Atsushi Ono

Vice-head of the Supernatural Phenomenon Treatment Bureau and Measures. He seems to be one of the most level headed of all the characters in this show and comes to warn the Cozy Family of Hiratsuka Raichou return. Grim Reaper (III) refers to him as Papa, but since it was informed earlier that her family is dead she looks up to him as her father, but isn't above slugging him if he ticks her off or is embarrassed. In the end it seems that he and his daughter were fired, as they are both looking through garbage cans for food.

Spider the Ninja (≪蜘蛛≫, Kumo)

Voiced by: Takeshi Ohara

A ninja that makes his appearance in episode 14 that works for Hiratsuka Raichou, more or less as her personal servant, in the Bureau. Not much is known about him except he talks in a hyper tone, has six swords on his back in the form of spider legs with a spider-like abdomen for his webs, and wears an eye guard with eight dots on them. He likes to tease Raichou by stating she will get fat for how much she eats. In reality, he is actually Wakarazunomiya Million's direct subordinate and is serving Raichou to watch over her work. He now seems to enjoy drawing faces on Raichou's stomach as he jumps at the chance to do so from Million's orders.

Raichō Hiratsuka (平塚 雷蝶, Hiratsuka Raichō)

Voiced by: Yuko Goto

The Head of the Supernatural Phenomenon Treatment Bureau as well as known by being its greatest traitor, the Bureau's biggest mistake, and by Ōka as "The Empire's Terrorist". She is the young butterfly girl (codenamed: Electric Butterfly) that cameos in almost every episode as a background character up until episode 13. At the moment it is unknown to what she has done but Ōka states that "even the death sentence wasn't enough". She usually acts and talks innocently but is very cryptic and seems as everything she does has an ulterior motive; even frightening Chika with her presence alone. She will appear at random and give some kind of test to the Cozy Family, but if they refuse she has gone as far as threatening Kyōka that she would fire Ōka and remove him from Operation Cozy Family if they don't accept the mission. A running gag is most of the time she is about to eat some special sweet right before something happens that ruins it and is rarely seen without eating some kind of candy (where even with every time the scene moved away and back to here she is eating something different). She is named after the feminist writer Raicho Hiratsuka. She was able to get to this position thanks to Million, but she shows no respect for her as Million makes her do belly dances for her amusement.

Wakarazunomiya Million (姫宮百万子 / 不解宮ミリオン)

Voiced by: Hitomi Nabatame

She owns the company Wakarazunomiya, and used its great influence and financial power to secure Raichō Hiratsuka's position as the Head of the Bureau. She is also from the Himemiya family and is Chika and Yūka's older sister. It was revealed that the Himemiya family was integrated into the Wakarazunomiya family after Kyoka's and the family's assault on the mansion. Ignoring the Himemiya family tradition, Million never took out her frustrations on her younger sister. However, this only terrified Chika, who believed that Million was only trying to lower her guard in order to do something terrible to her later. Chika became so paranoid that she tried to train a monster she found in the woods to kill her sister. So far, her face has never seen, but she wears a very large dress with long curled golden hair. At the moment, Million appears to be the real power behind the Bureau, but it was never explained what she is up to. She stays in touch with Raichō and shows a great deal of interest in Operation Cozy family, most likely due to Yūka and Chika's inclusion in the family.

Gouyokuou (強欲王, Gouyokuou)

Voiced by: Tomokazu Seki

An alien from an unknown planet who calls himself the "King of Greed" who fell in love with Gekka 1000 years ago. He came to her planet where she originally turned him down but then told him that she will give him an answer in 1000 years and left her planet in his care. He is the alien the Cozy Family is sent out to deal with, as the alien eggs that rained down on the planet was a way for him to acquire nourishment. He appears weak, trying his best to understand the earthling customs, but he is extremely powerful as if one of the pins protruding from his back are removed he can destroy several blocks by accident; however, if they are all removed he can easily destroy a planet. At the moment he is waiting on earth for Gekka to return with her answer. In the end he states that he will continue to wait for her but is happy to hear that Gekka will marry him.

Oasis (オアシス, Oashisu)

Voiced by: Nana Mizuki

She is a young female alien with long braided blue hair which has a large eyeball at the end from the planet Ocean (which looks very similar to Jupiter) that had come to Earth to figure out the meaning of the word "love". Through bad information from Raichō the family mistakes this alien to be the "weak looking but very powerful alien" and do their best to try to teach her the meaning of love so she would leave. However, through a mixture of confusion and coincidence it appears she is having an affair with Ōka (sneaking into his bathtub, kissing him at night (which was actually in her mind a life-threatening situation to make him wake up as she was sucking out his juices). Even though her body looks like that of a normal human she has no skin and is made up entirely of water (because of this she gets dehydrated quite often) and can even morph her appearance into weapons. It is stated by Ōka that she reminds him a lot of Kyōka. Although, she figures out what love is as she truly falls in love with Ōka, she is last seen with Gouyokuou when Gekka sends them far off into space.

Kyupi Do (Kyupi Dou)

Voiced by: Sayuri Yahagi

A servant to Kyōka back when she was ruling the underground empire Shangri-La. Even now she is still fiercely loyal to her, referring to Kyōka as Bakka Kyōkya which means My Master Kyōkya (some of the characters mistaken it as Baka Kyōka, meaning stupid Kyōka) and has a habit of jumping to Kyōka to hug her to be replied with being punched, which without hesitation immediately repeats the action once again. She has very dark skin, wears a loin-cloth, a mask over her mouth, markings all over her body and wields a large dagger. She wishes for Kyōka to return to Shangri-La but after she says no Kyupi tries to kill Ōka as she believes he is keeping her away from them. However, Kyōka later explains that even though she was being worshiped like a god she felt no warmth, telling Kyupi that she wasn't forced into Operation Cozy Family and joined it because "even a god needs love too."

Rindō Katsura (桂 林道, Katsura Rindō)

Voiced by: Satoshi Hino

A normal university student living a normal life, with no particular problems but nothing particularly fulfilling either. He does not live with his parents and has to support himself. He always feels inferior to others. He used to be Ginka's neighbor before he moved in with the Midarezaki family. In actuality, he is not a legitimate student of the university he goes to. He faked his way into the school, but he is such a hard worker that nobody (even the staff) cares. One night he found a stray cat in the rain outside his apartment and he took her in. The cat turned into a catgirl the next morning. The cat's name is Milcatopy, and she is a yōkai. She was chased by soldiers from the secret city where yōkai live in isolation, and had escaped to find money and get medicine for her mother. This happened before the Operation Cozy Family was established and around that time that Kyōka lived like a stray cat. While they were chased by the soldiers Rindō tripped over a weary looking Kyōka who asked for food. Rindō gave her a canned sardine and as a thanks for the food Kyōka chased the soldiers away for them. Thanks to Ginka's efforts and begging his boss, Rindō and Milcatopy ended up working and living in the bar where Ginka worked. After all of this, Rindou gave Milcatopy the gift he promised her in the form of a kiss. They are seen as a couple in later episodes, still working at Virgo.

Vitamin C
Vitamin C is a character that plays a central role in episode 20. He is a monster whom Chika discovered in a house when she was younger, and whom she attempted to use to murder her older sister, Wakarazunomiya Million, for being too nice to her and making her nervous. In actuality, the monster Chika saw was a scared escaped convict (as a child who had no perception of how people are, she literally saw the convict as a monster and perceived him physically as such despite the man was a human being). Her plan did not work as the man was too frightened to murder another person and ran away. Vitamin C appears in the city throughout the episode, causing no end of havoc until Chika confronts him, violently beating him to death in the street out of sheer frustration. Her perception of Vitamin C as a monster faded away shortly after. The escaped convict she called Vitamin C in the past turned out to be a reformed man whom she met with at the end of the episode.

== Music ==
There are 9 different theme music with 1 opening theme and 8 other ending themes. The 8 different ending themes are sung by each of the 8 main characters. The order of ending scenes/songs broadcast differs in each TV station. The song will be played is randomly selected on its internet radio show each week.

=== Opening theme ===
- "Chōsai Kenbo Sengen" (超妻賢母宣言) by MOSAIC.WAV

=== Ending themes ===
| Title | Kana | Sung by | Character |
|---|---|---|---|
| "Appare Henka ja." | あっぱれ変化じゃ。 | Rina Satō | Gekka |
| "Boku wa Kōshin Saremashita" | ボクハ更新サレマシタ | Ryō Hirohashi | Hyōka |
| "Codename wa Lady-X" | コードネイムはLady-X | Yoshinori Fujita | Ginka |
| "Hen na Kami-sama Shitteru yo" | ヘンな神さま知ってるよ | Kana Hanazawa | Yūka |
| "Kyōran Senki ~Nichijō no Kami-sama~" | 狂乱戦記 〜日常ノ神サマ〜 | Ayumi Fujimura | Kyōka |
| "Sekai de Ichiban Yabai Koi" | 世界で一番ヤバイ恋 | Haruka Tomatsu | Chika |
| "THE PITFALLS" | | Takayuki Kondo | Ōka |
| "Wagahai wa Shugojū de Aru, ka?" | 我輩は守護獣である、か? | Hiroki Yasumoto | Teika |

== Books ==
=== Main novels ===
1. Kyōran Kazoku Nikki Ichi Satsume (ISBN 4757722907)
2. Kyōran Kazoku Nikki Ni Satsume (ISBN 475772358X)
3. Kyōran Kazoku Nikki San Satsume (ISBN 4757724330)
4. Kyōran Kazoku Nikki Shi Satsume (ISBN 4757726201)
5. Kyōran Kazoku Nikki Go Satsume (ISBN 4757728271)
6. Kyōran Kazoku Nikki Roku Satsume (ISBN 4757728689)
7. Kyōran Kazoku Nikki Shichi Satsume (ISBN 978-4-7577-3420-3)
8. Kyōran Kazoku Nikki Hachi Satsume (ISBN 978-4-7577-3633-7)
9. Kyōran Kazoku Nikki Kyū Satsume (ISBN 4757741324)
10. Kyōran Kazoku Nikki Jū Satsume (ISBN 4757743319)
11. Kyōran Kazoku Nikki Jūichi Satsume (ISBN 4757745176)
12. Kyōran Kazoku Nikki Jūni Satsume (ISBN 4047261408)
13. Kyōran Kazoku Nikki Jūsan Satsume (ISBN 4047263982)
14. Kyōran Kazoku Nikki Jūshi Satsume (ISBN 978-4-04-726818-0)
15. Kyōran Kazoku Nikki Jūgo Satsume (ISBN 978-4-04-727131-9)

=== Extra novels ===
1. Kyōran Kazoku Nikki Bangai Sono Ichi (ISBN 4757730322)
2. Kyōran Kazoku Nikki Bangai Sono Ni (ISBN 4757738544)
3. Kyōran Kazoku Nikki Bangai Sono San (ISBN 4757741723)
4. Kyōran Kazoku Nikki Bangai Sono Yon (ISBN 4757747055)
5. Kyōran Kazoku Nikki Bangai Sono Go (ISBN 475774983X)
6. Kyōran Kazoku Nikki Bangai Sono Roku (ISBN 404726315X)
7. Kyōran Kazoku Nikki Bangai Sono Nana (ISBN 978-4-04-726651-3)
8. Kyōran Kazoku Nikki Bangai Sono Hachi (ISBN 978-4-04-727032-9)
9. Kyōran Kazoku Nikki Bangai Sono Kyū (ISBN 978-4-04-727395-5)
