= Maid café =

Subcategory of cosplay restaurants

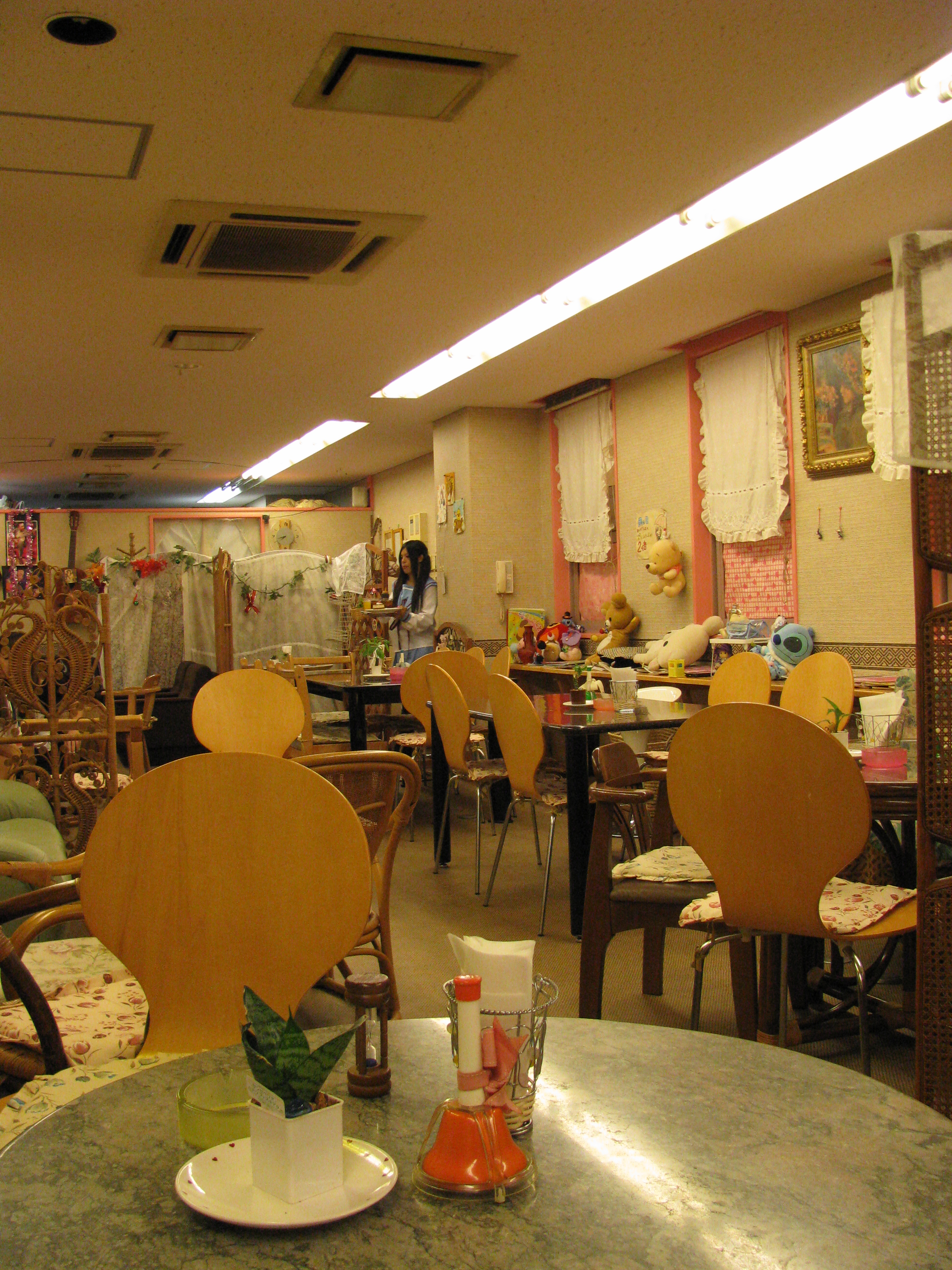
Interior of a maid café in Osaka, Japan

Maid cafés (Japanese: メイド喫茶 or メイドカフェ, Hepburn: meido kissa or meido kafe) are a subcategory of cosplay restaurants found predominantly in Japan and Taiwan. In these cafés, waitresses, dressed in maid costumes, act as servants and treat customers as masters (and mistresses), as if they were in a private home, rather than as café patrons. The first permanent maid café, Cure Maid Café, was established in Akihabara, Tokyo, Japan, in March 2001, and they have since become popular across the country. Increased competition drove the cafés to employ more diversified themes, gimmicks, and even unusual tactics to attract customers. They have also expanded overseas to several countries, including the United States.

Maid doing a ritual hand clap to put out a candle in an Akihabara maid café, 2020

== History ==
In 1979, Anna Miller's, a "proto-maid cafe", introduced their waitress uniforms to Japan. These consisted of a white blouse; an orange or pink miniskirted jumper-style dress, with the "waistline" cut beneath the breasts, in the manner of a bodice; a matching apron; and a heart-shaped name tag. The outfit most likely helped to establish the maid café phenomenon when the video game series Variable Geo (1993) and the manga series Welcome to Pia Carrot (1996) used waitress outfits seemingly modeled after the Anna Miller's uniforms. In a MegaTokyo web comic published in 2000, one of the main female characters works as a waitress at an Anna Miller's in Tokyo.

Maid cafés were traditionally associated with Akihabara (秋葉原), a district in Tokyo famous for its extensive electronics and anime- and manga-related stores. Commonly a place for otaku to visit, Akihabara contains several themed cafes, including maid cafes. However, with the increasing media attention on these cafes, they have developed into tourist attractions as well, and less of an otaku hotspot. Because of this, peak wait times can be about two hours. These establishments also tap into a new trend in Japan that deals with alternate forms of intimacy. Historically, following Japan's economic crash during the 1990s, the ideas surrounding intimacy changed to become more individualistic. Because of this, some people who struggle to form interpersonal relationships with others turn to other forms of intimacy to fulfill the missing intimacy in their lives. Therefore, maid cafes provide a place for people to do so, especially for those who are interested in manga and anime because these cafes tend to mimic these works. Though maid cafes can have suggestive connotations, these establishments do not provide any sexual services.

== Comparison to other establishments ==
Though maid cafés do not provide sexual services, the gender relations contribute to the popularity and enjoyable experience for patrons. Scholars such as Patrick Galbraith and Anne Allison conclude that maid cafés provide a very different experience compared to things such as hostess clubs. These places focus more on the workplace and satisfying men due to their hard work, whereas maid cafés operate in quite different ways. For example, visiting maid cafés is often not seen as shameful, whereas chronic visits to a hostess bar are viewed quite differently in Japan. In fact, many maid cafés rely on regular customers to provide stable business. Instead, maid cafés focus on providing an escape from the home and work spheres. Furthermore, according to anthropologists such as Anne Allison, a maid café lacks the same sexual and caretaker undertones that hostess bars do. Maids encapsulate a more pure form that provides an alternate world to patrons. Customers tend not to stray from appropriate topics in an attempt to preserve the space created through role-play with the maid.

== Employees ==
These maids are almost always younger women, ranging from around 18 years old to their mid-twenties. These women make roughly around the Japanese minimum wage and tend to live with their families. The maids themselves tend to be interested in anime and other aspects of otaku culture, which also allows them to create further connections with their patrons. However, these jobs tend not to be careers for these women, but rather stopgaps before acquiring permanent employment elsewhere. Contrary to popular belief, the maids themselves tend to enjoy their work because they can express themselves and explore the café's alternate character universe alongside the patrons. However, issues remain regarding patron conduct outside the workplace. Although strict rules are established to prevent disorderly conduct at these cafés, some customers violate these rules and attempt to make contact outside the workplace, causing maids to experience discomfort. Preserving a particular image/identity is also vital to upholding the fantasy component of these establishments. In addition to the strict rules for patrons, the maids adopt different names for work and are not allowed to smoke or drink. Their personal relationships with men are also affected, as they cannot spend time with other Akihabara men. Doing so allows the maids to uphold a specific identity for their patrons and potential customers. When their careers as maids come to a close, whether due to age or by choice, some can opt to work for the corporate agencies behind these cafés. For example, one prominent maid from a home cafe opted to work in advertising after entering the dating scene, thereby altering her identity as a maid.

== Costume and appearance ==
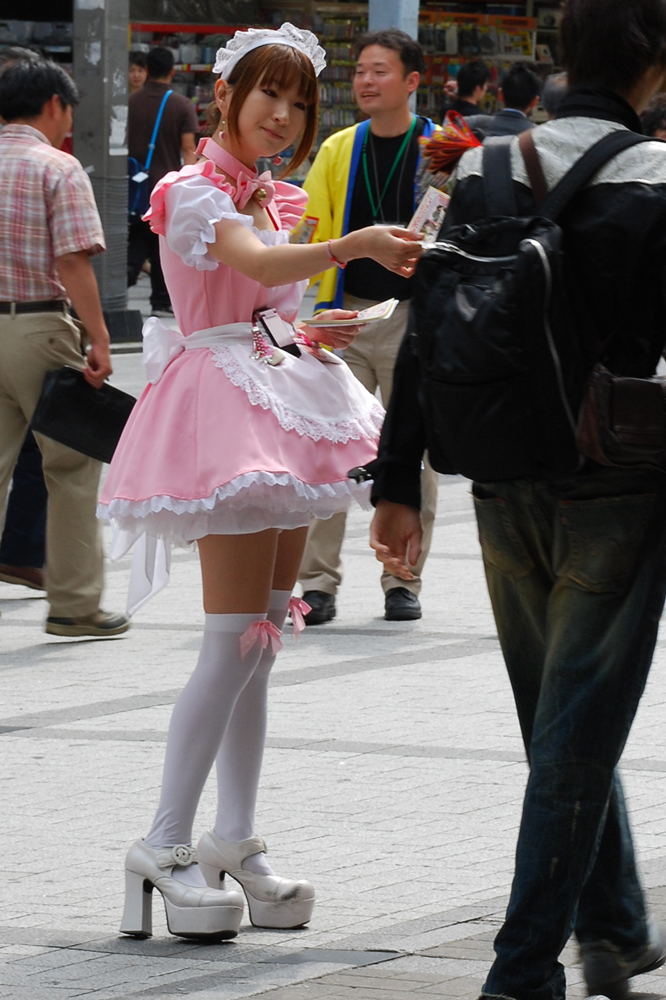
A maid distributing flyers in Akihabara

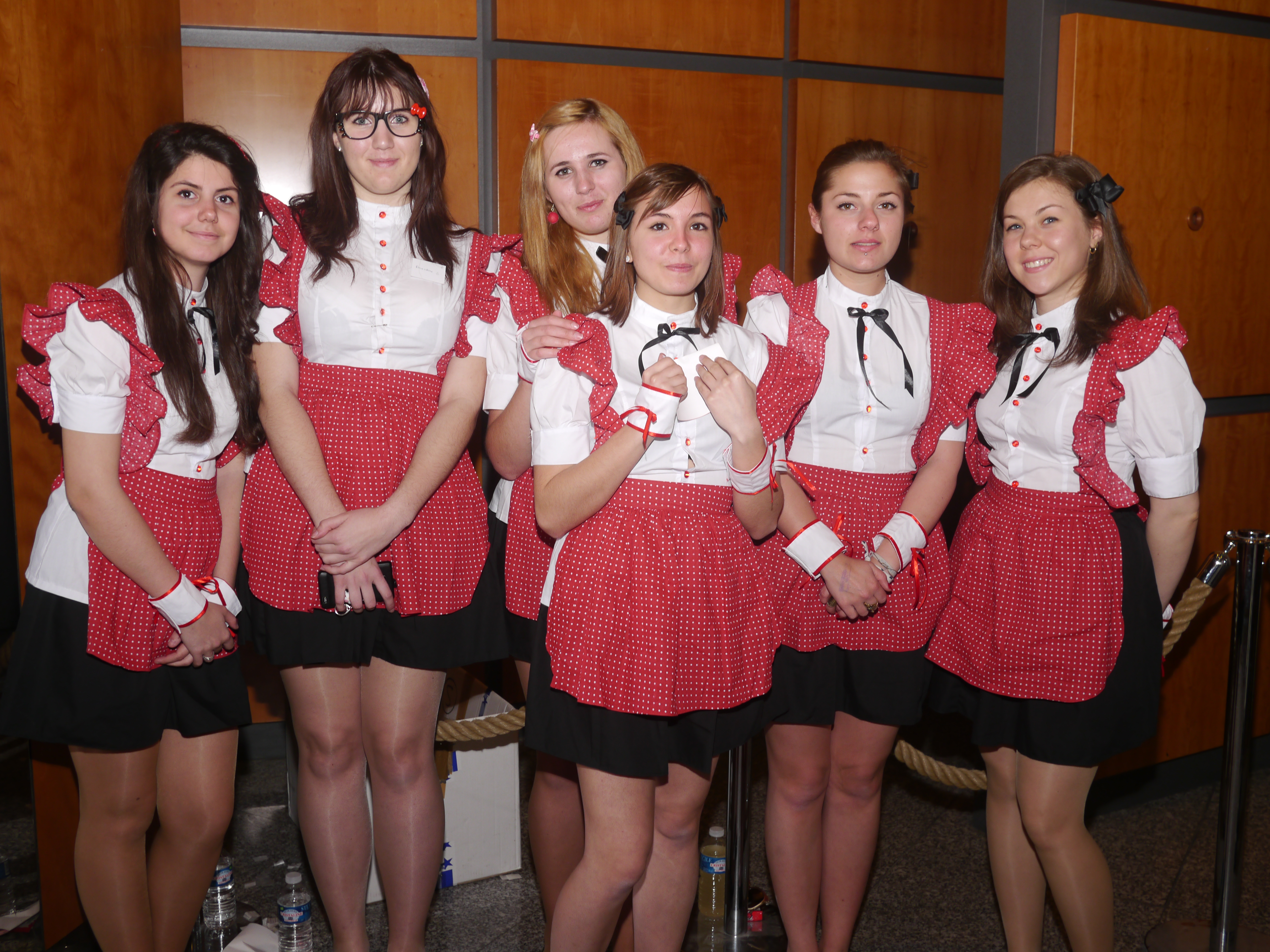
Waitresses at a maid café in Toulon, France

The maid costume varies from café to café, but most are based upon the costume of French maids, often composed of a dress, a petticoat, a pinafore, a matching hair accessory (such as a frill or a bow), and stockings. Often, employees will also cosplay as anime characters. Sometimes, employees wear animal ears with their outfits to add more appeal. Most commonly, manga-style costumes are worn.

Waitresses in maid cafés are often chosen for their appearance; most are young, attractive, and innocent-looking women. Applicants are sometimes tested to determine whether they can sufficiently portray the character they will be cosplaying as. To maintain the cosplay fantasy, some employees may be contractually obligated not to reveal personal information to patrons, to slip out of character, or to allow patrons to see them out of costume.

These maids are traditionally female, while men perform operational tasks such as cooking. However, some maid cafés also have cross-dressing males as maids. Crossdressing maid cafés have attracted a lot of attention and have become very popular.

== Clientele ==
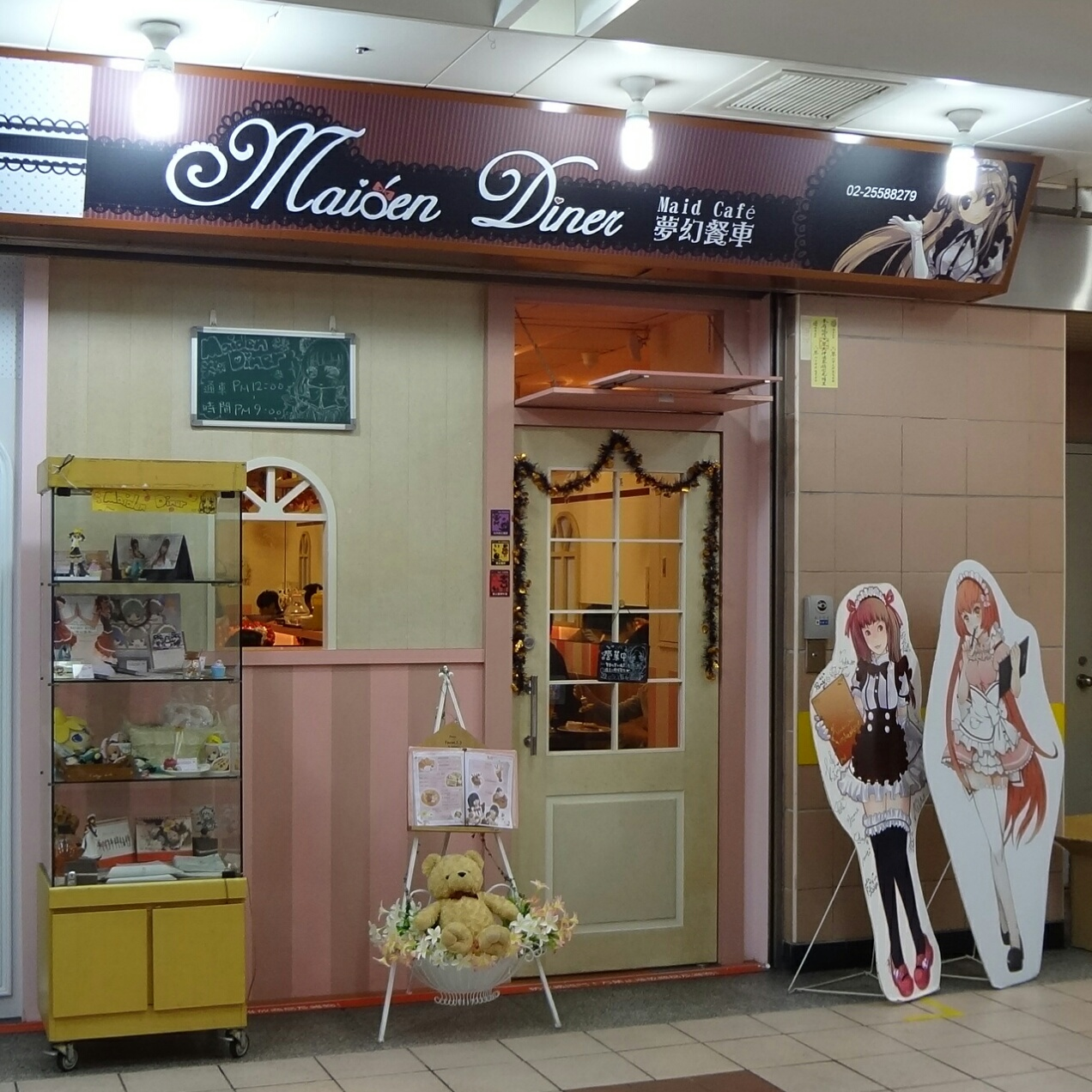
Entrance of a maid café in Taipei

Maid cafés were originally designed primarily to cater to the fantasies of male otaku – fans of anime, manga, and video games. They have been likened to the otaku equivalent of hostess bars. The image of the maid has been popularized and fetishized in many manga and anime series, as well as in gal games. Important to the otaku attraction to maid cafés is the Japanese concept of moe. People who have moe fetishes (especially a specific subcategory known as maid moe) are therefore attracted to an establishment in which they can interact with real-life manifestations (both physically and in demeanor) of the fictional maid characters that they have fetishized. Cafés may also employ a tsundere theme - another character trope which is a subset of the moe phenomenon and refers to a character who is initially cold or hostile before revealing feelings of warmth or affection.

Around the early 2000s, maid cafés became more common and popular in Japan as otaku culture became increasingly mainstream. As a result, there has been a diversification of themes and services at the restaurants, but they are ultimately still predominantly colored by anime and video games. Today, the maid café phenomenon attracts more than just male otaku, but also couples, tourists, and women.

Other types of cafés consist of:

- Victorian style, based on the Victorian era of the U.K.
- "Modern-traditional", where maids wear a mixture of kimono and maid outfits.
- Neko Café: Neko (ネコ, 猫) means cat in Japanese, and maids will wear cat tails and cat ears.

== Menu ==
Most maid cafés offer menus similar to those of more typical cafés. Customers can order coffee, other beverages, and a wide variety of entrées and desserts. However, in maid cafés, waitresses will often decorate a customer's order with cute designs at their table. Syrup can be used to decorate desserts, and Omurice (オムライス, Omu-raisu), a popular entrée combining omelets and rice, is typically decorated using ketchup. This service adds to the image of the waitress as an innocent but pampering maid. These prices are typically raised to compensate for the service provided by these maids.

In the making of these decorative desserts and entrées, maids will often also begin to say chants, making both the experience and food that their customers are about to receive seem more "magical" [sic].

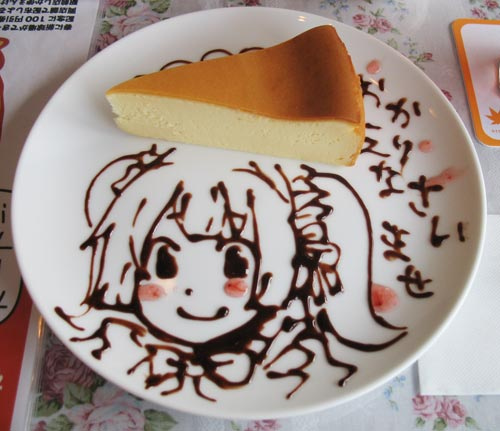
Example of cheesecake served at a maid café

== Rituals, etiquette, and additional services ==
Many rituals and additional services are offered at many maid cafés. Maids greet customers with "Welcome home, Master (Mistress/My lady)!" (お帰りなさいませ、ご主人様 (お嬢様)！, Okaerinasaimase, goshujinsama (ojousama)!) and offer them wipe towels and menus. Maids will also kneel by the table to stir cream and sugar into a customer's coffee, and some cafés even offer spoon-feeding services to customers. Customers can also sometimes play rock-paper-scissors, card games, board games, and video games with maids as well as prepare arts and crafts and sing karaoke.

Many maid cafés have a small stage where the maids perform and take pictures with customers.

Customers are also expected to follow basic rules when they are at a maid café. In 2014, a Tokyo maid café published a list of 10 rules for customers. For example, customers should not touch a maid's body, ask for a maid's personal contact information, or otherwise invade her personal privacy (by stalking). One common rule in a maid café is that photographs of maids or the café interior are forbidden. However, customers may have the option to pay an extra fee to have their photograph taken with a maid, who may hand-decorate it. Some maid cafés implement an hourly charge. Patrons are further reminded of these rules when entering, as posters are often on the wall listing rules for that particular establishment.

== See also ==
- Akihabara Trilogy (film series inspired by maid cafés)
- Band-Maid (a female Japanese rock band with a maid café theme)
- Butler café
- Cigarette girl
- Maid Sama!
- Maidcore
