= Akihabara =

Shopping area in Chiyoda, Tokyo, Japan

Akihabara 秋葉原
- Urban area
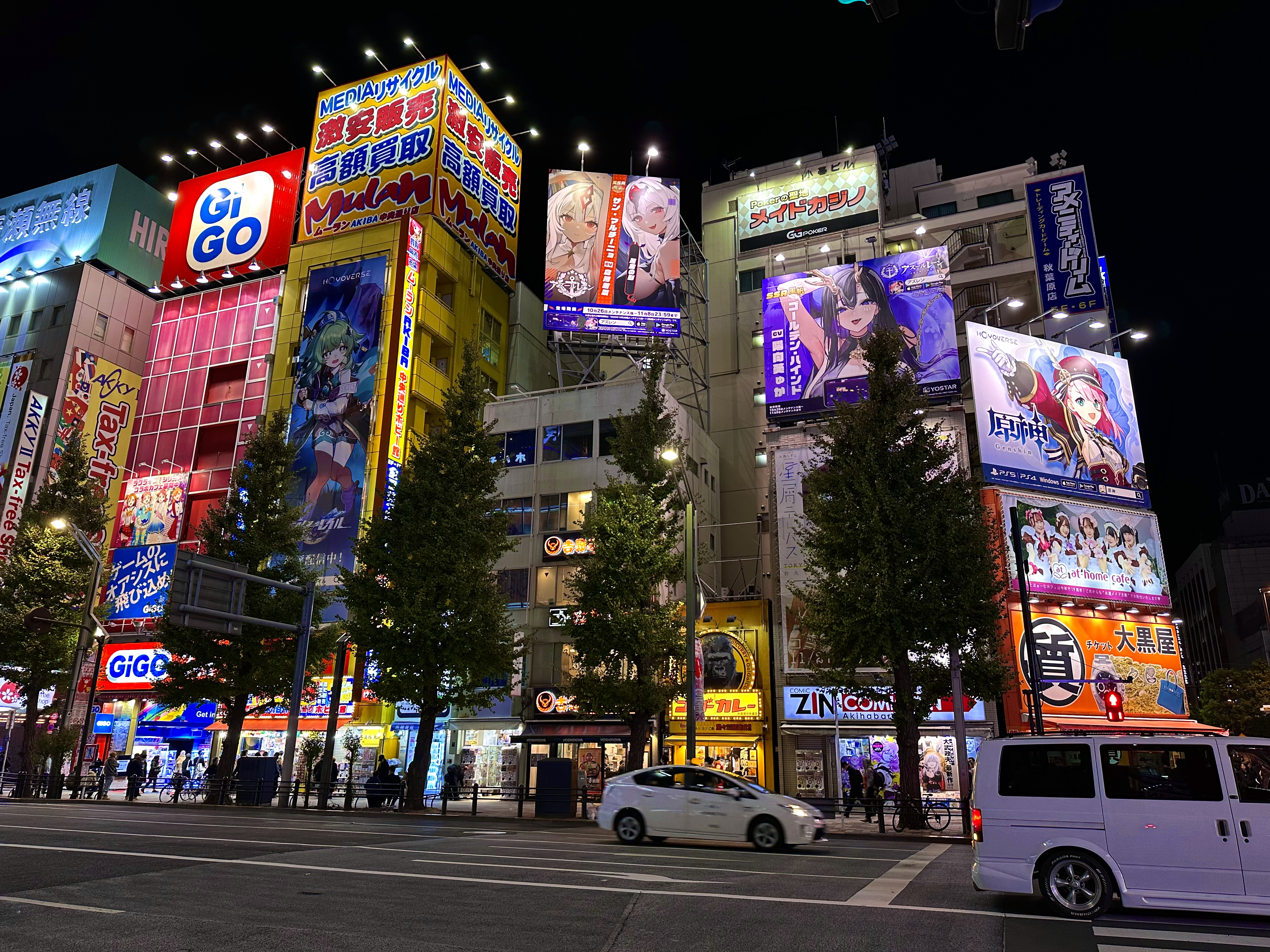
- Akihabara in 2023
- Nicknames: Akihabara Electric Town, The Otaku Capital of the World, Anime City
- Location within Special wards of Tokyo Location within Japan
- Coordinates: 35°41′54″N 139°46′23″E
- Country: Japan
- City: Tokyo
- Ward: Chiyoda, Taitō

Akihabara (Japanese: 秋葉原) is a neighborhood in the Chiyoda ward of Tokyo, Japan, generally considered to be the area surrounding Akihabara Station (nicknamed Akihabara Electric Town). This area is part of the Sotokanda (外神田) and Kanda-Sakumachō districts of Chiyoda. There is an administrative district called Akihabara (part of Taitō ward), located north of Akihabara Electric Town surrounding Akihabara Neribei Park.

The name Akihabara is a shortening of Akibagahara (秋葉ヶ原), which comes from Akiba (秋葉), named after a fire-controlling deity of a firefighting shrine built after the area was destroyed by a fire in 1869. Akihabara gained the nickname Akihabara Electric Town (秋葉原電気街, Akihabara Denki Gai) shortly after World War II for being a major shopping center for household electronic goods and the post-war black market.

Akihabara is considered by many to be the center of Japanese otaku culture, and is a major shopping district for video games, anime, manga, electronics and computer-related goods. Icons from popular anime and manga are displayed prominently on the shops in the area, and numerous maid cafés and large arcades are found throughout the district.

== Geography ==
The main area of Akihabara is located on a street just west of Akihabara Station. There is an administrative district called Akihabara north of Akihabara Electric Town surrounding Akihabara Neribei Park. This district is part of Taitō ward.

== History ==
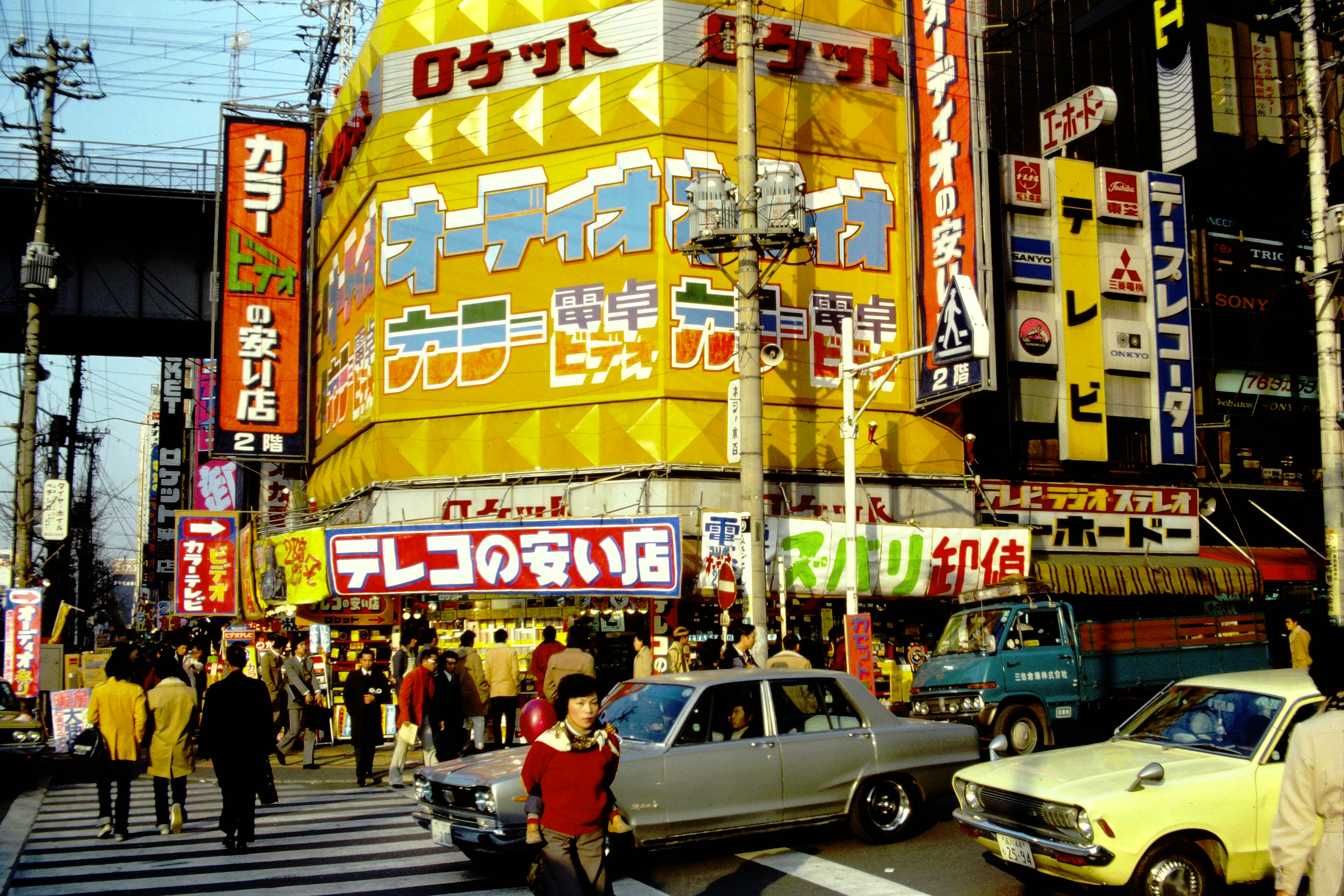
Akihabara in 1976

Akihabara was once near a city gate of Edo and served as a passage between the city and northwestern Japan. This made the region a home to many craftsmen and tradesmen, as well as some low-class samurai. One of Tokyo's frequent fires destroyed the area in 1869, and the people decided to replace the buildings of the area with a shrine called Chinkasha (now known as Akiba Shrine 秋葉神社 Akiba Jinja, lit. 'fire extinguisher shrine'), in an attempt to prevent the spread of future fires. The locals nicknamed the shrine Akiba after the deity that could control fire, and the area around it became known as Akibagahara, later Akihabara. After Akihabara Station was built in 1888, the shrine was moved to the Taitō ward, where it resides today.

Since its opening in 1890, Akihabara Station became a major freight transit point, which allowed a vegetable and fruit market to spring up. In the 1920s, the station saw a large volume of passengers after opening for public transport. After World War II, the black market thrived in the absence of a strong government. This disconnection of Akihabara from government authority allowed the district to grow as a market city. In the 1950s, this climate turned Akihabara into a market region specializing in electronic household appliances, such as washing machines, refrigerators, television sets, and stereos, earning Akihabara the nickname "Electric Town".

As household electronics began to lose their futuristic appeal in the 1980s, the shops of Akihabara shifted their focus to home computers, at a time when they were only used by specialists and hobbyists. This brought in a new type of consumer, computer nerds or otaku. The market in Akihabara latched onto their new customer base that was focused on anime, manga, and video games. The connection between Akihabara and otaku has grown to the point that the region is a center for otaku culture.

On June 8, 2008, a man drove a truck into crowds at the crossing of Kanda Myōjin-dōri and Chūō-dōri streets in Akihabara, killing three people and injuring two. He then stabbed at least twelve people using a dagger, killing four and injuring eight. After the attack the 35-year practice of closing Chūō-dōri avenue to vehicular traffic on Sundays and holiday afternoons was discontinued.

As part of the Tokyo revitalization 2030 plan the government has announced it plans to turn Akihabara into a center for AI research and luxury shopping brand experiences to try to distance the neighborhood from its Anime reputation.

== Otaku culture ==
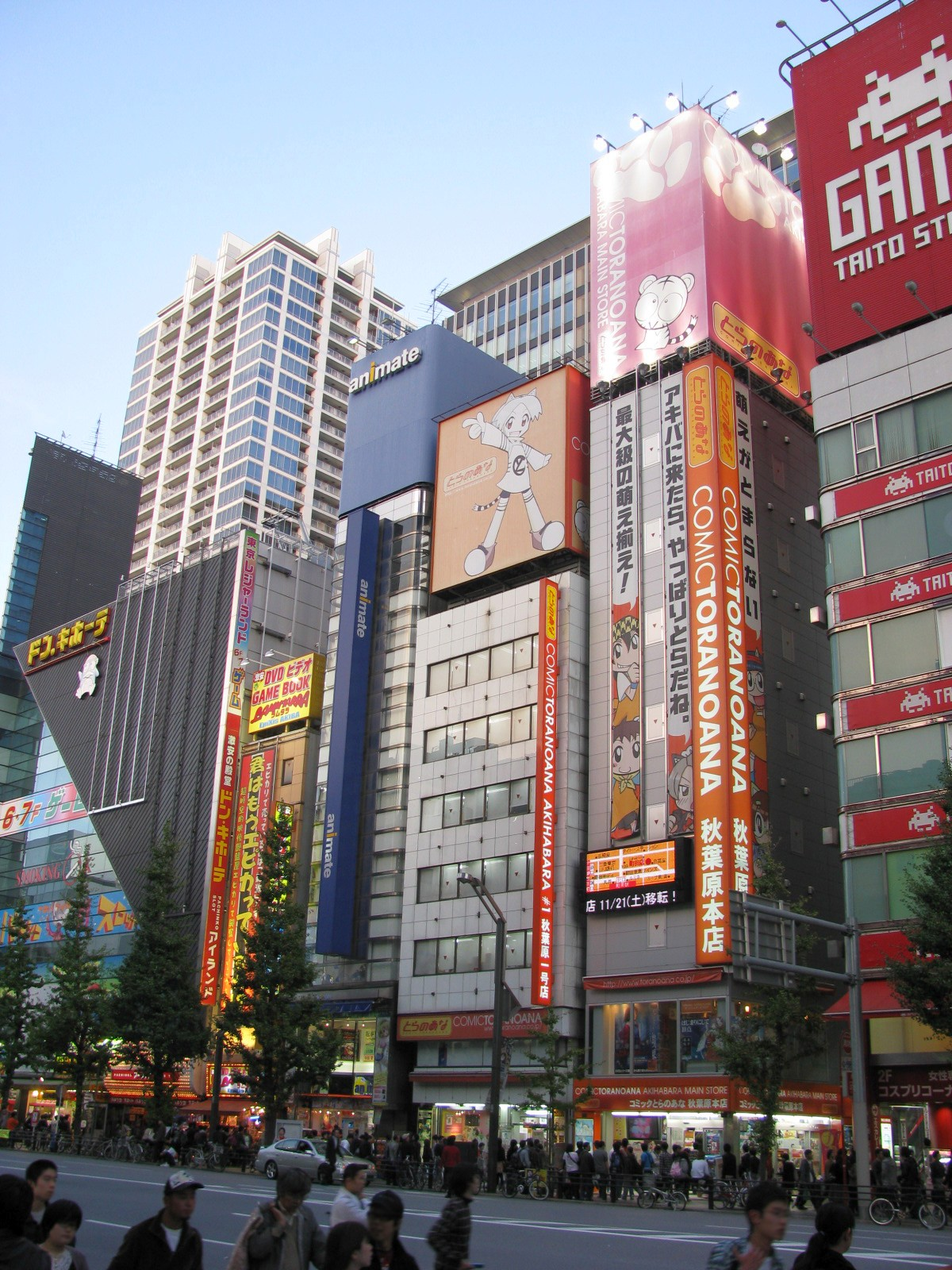
Animate and Comic Toranoana stores

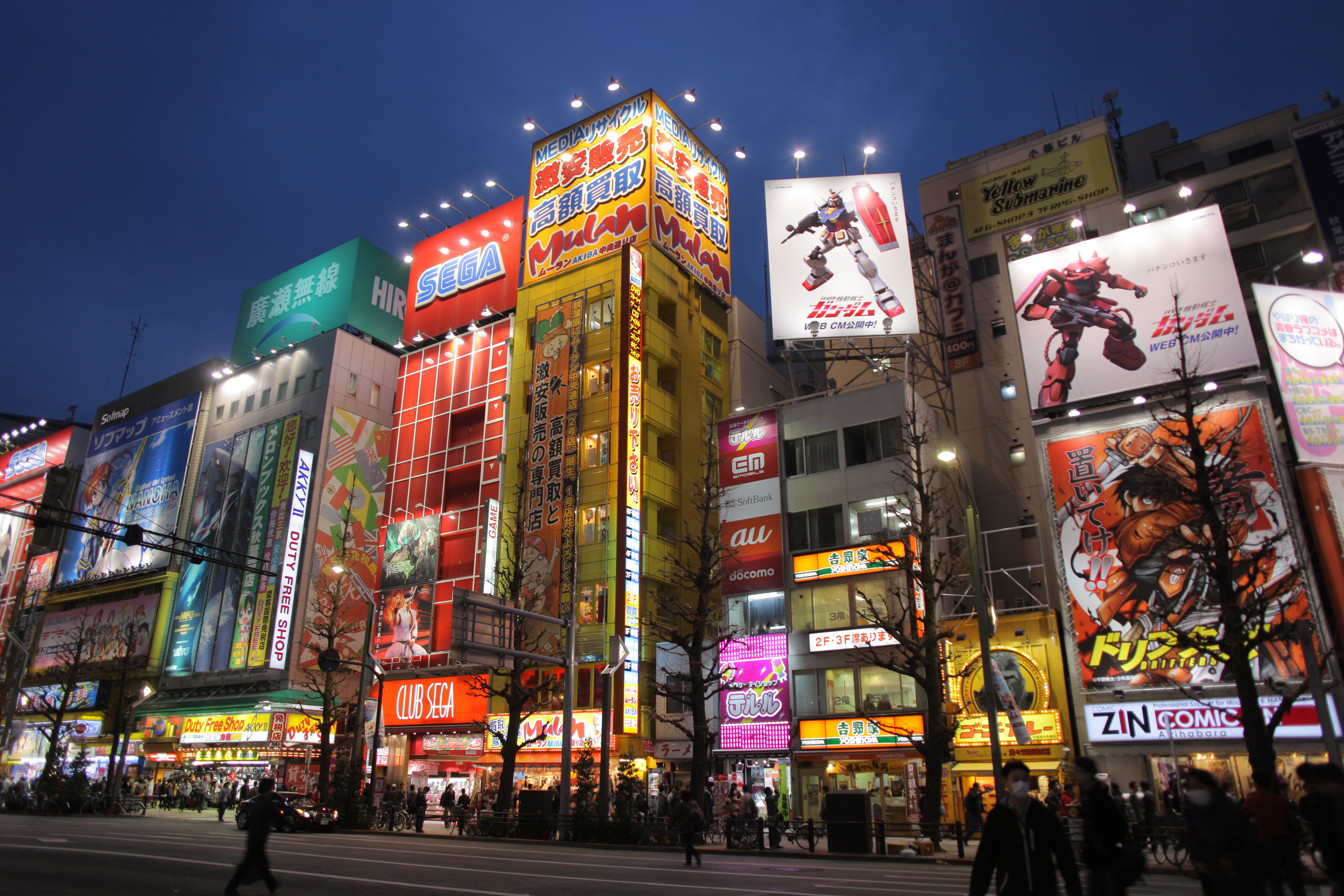
Club Sega

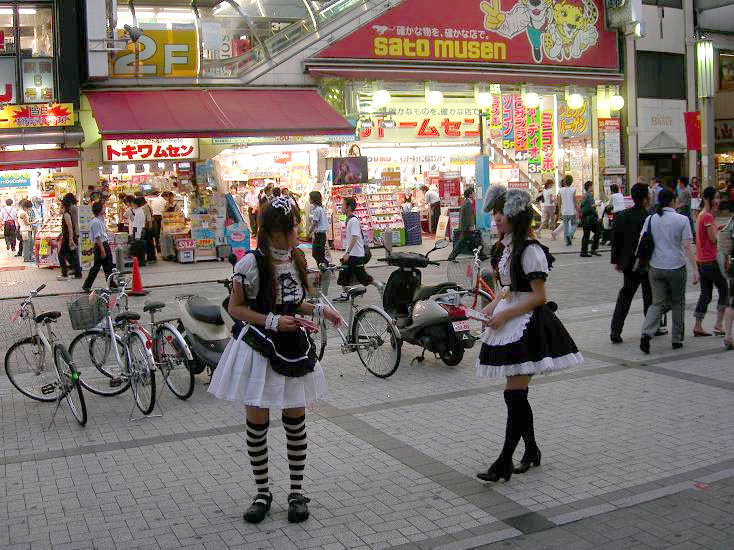
"Maids" promoting maid cafés near Akihabara Station

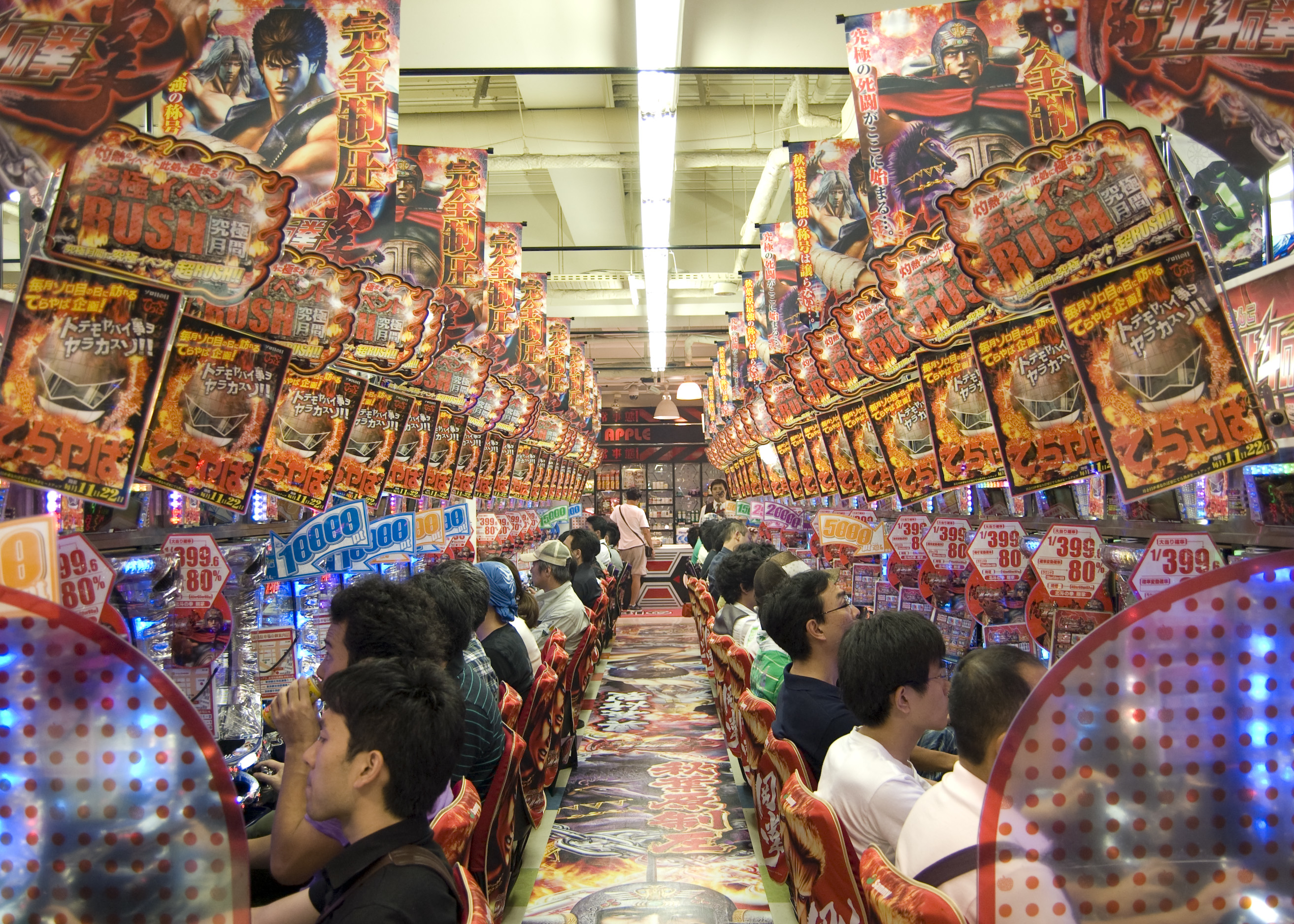
Pachinko parlor

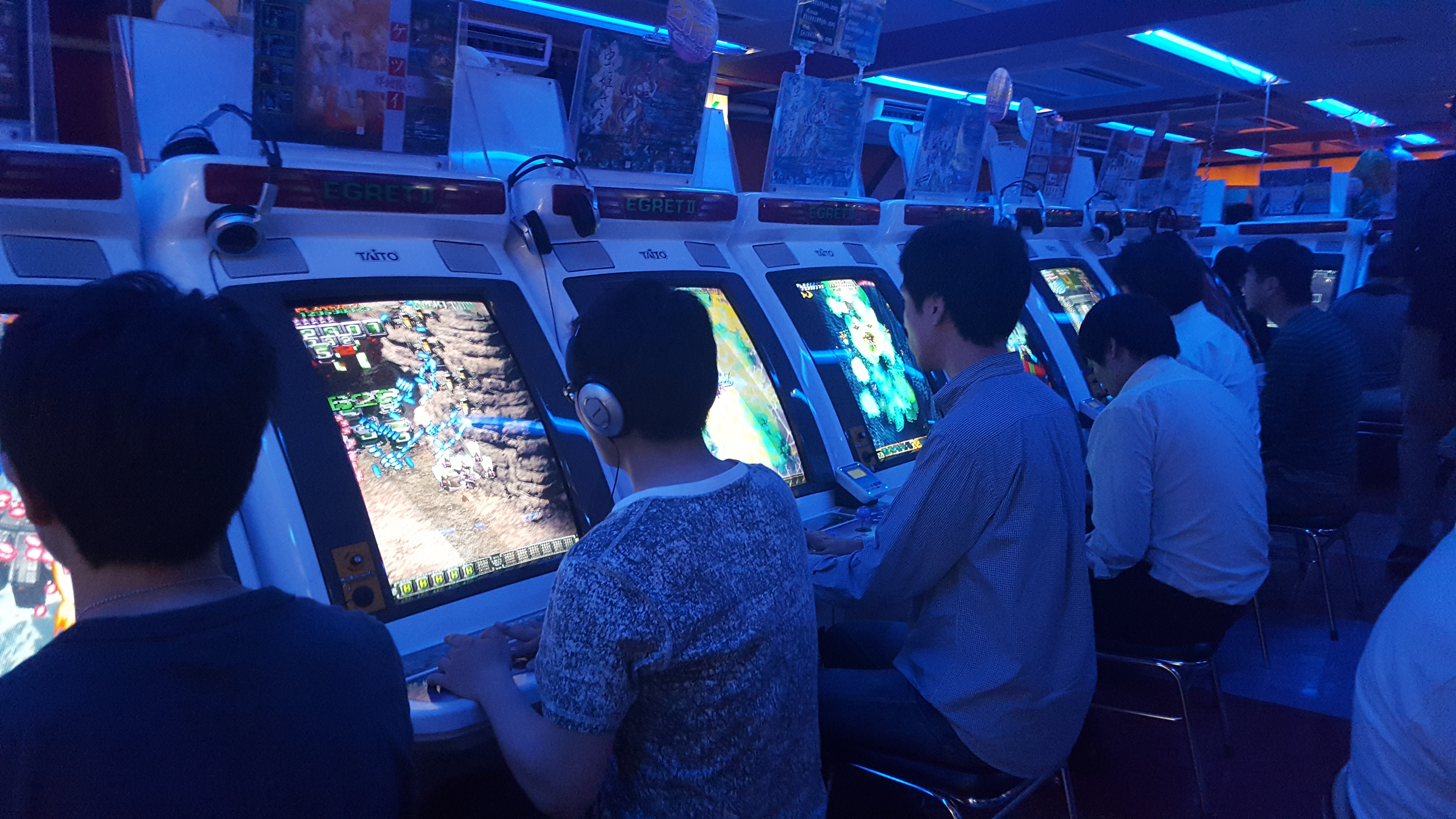
Arcade with candy cabinets

The streets of Akihabara are covered with anime and manga icons, and cosplayers line the sidewalks handing out advertisements, especially for maid cafés. Release events, special events, and conventions are common in Akihabara. Architects design the stores of Akihabara to be opaque and closed, to reflect the desire of many otaku to live in their anime worlds rather than display their interests.

Akihabara's role as a free market has allowed a large amount of amateur work to find an audience. Doujinshi (amateur or fanmade manga) has been growing in Akihabara since the 1970s.

== Transport ==
Akihabara is accessible by train, bus and car.

Akihabara Station

- Keihin-Tohoku Line (JK-28)
- Yamanote Line (JY-03)
- Chūō-Sōbu Line (JB-19)
- Hibiya Line (H-16)
- Tsukuba Express (TX01)

Iwamotocho Station

- Toei Shinjuku Line (S-08)

Suehirocho Station

- Ginza Line (G-14)

== See also ==
- Akiba-kei
- Akihabara Trilogy
- Akihabara massacre
- Kanda Shrine, Shinto shrine near Akihabara
- Nipponbashi, in Osaka
- Ōsu, in Nagoya
- Tourism in Japan
