= Beckii Cruel =

English YouTuber (born 1995)

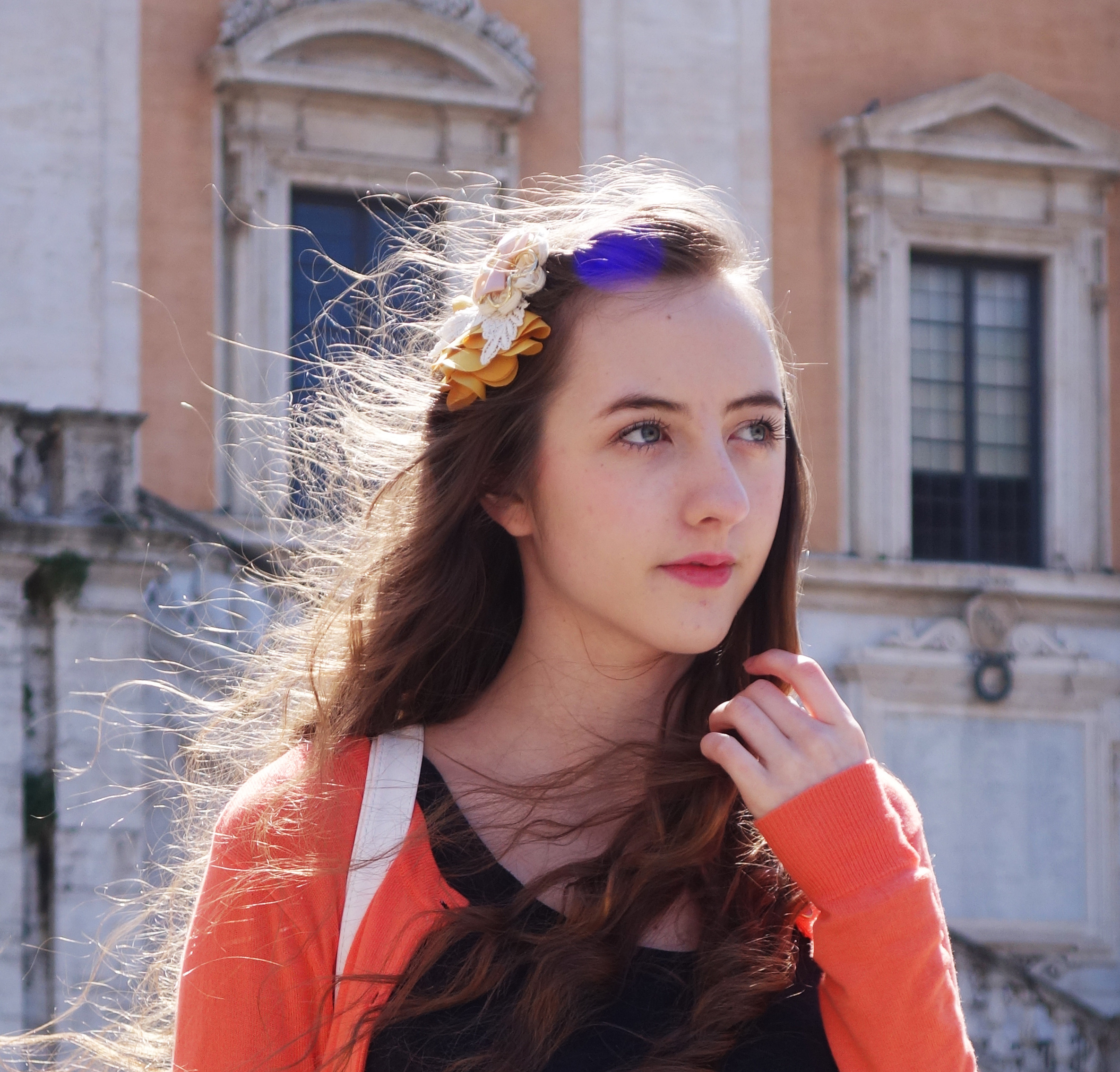
- Beckii Cruel in Rome, April 2015

Background information
- Also known as: Beckii; xBextahx
- Born: Rebecca Anne Flint; 5 June 1995 (age 31); Blackpool, Lancashire, England
- Origin: Ramsey, Isle of Man
- Genres: Pop; J-pop
- Occupations: YouTuber; marketing entrepreneur
- Instrument: Vocals
- Years active: 2007–present
- Label: Tokuma Japan Communications
- Formerly of: Cruel Angels
- Website: saintrebecca.com

YouTube information
- Channel: Beckii
- Years active: 2007–present
- Genres: Cover dance; beauty; vlog
- Subscribers: 108 thousand
- Views: 3.9 million
- Last updated: 21 May 2026

Rebecca Anne Flint (born 5 June 1995), also known professionally as Beckii Cruel (ベッキー・クルーエル, Bekkī Kurūeru), is a British YouTuber, marketing entrepreneur, and former singer.

Flint became known for her cover dance videos on YouTube, of which her channel has reached 20 million upload views and over 100,000 subscribers. In 2009, Flint's cover dance of "Danjo" went viral in Japan, and, by 2010, she was the 17th most subscribed user in the country. This led to a brief idol career in Japan, where Flint made her music debut through the No, Ballad Matsuri and No, Upper Matsuri compilation albums. She released her debut solo single, "Just Wanna Have Some Fun", in 2010, and was a member of the international girl group Cruel Angels, with whom she released the single "Tsubasa o Kudasai".

After 2011, Flint transitioned her video content to fashion and also launched her own fashion label, Bcky Couture. In December 2016, Flint began focusing on online marketing and co-founded Pepper Studio, an influencer marketing agency in London, in March 2019.

== Early life ==
Flint was born in Blackpool, England, the daughter of a police inspector and a former dance instructor. She also has an older brother named Ryan. She moved with her family at the age of 2 to Ramsey on the Isle of Man, where she attended Ramsey Grammar School. She became interested in anime and manga at the age of 11, when she first started reading Fruits Basket.

== Career ==
=== 2009–2010: Early YouTube career and Japanese debut ===
On 22 July 2007, Flint created a YouTube channel under the name "xBextahx", from a nickname she had when she was younger. The first video she uploaded was a cover dance of "Hare Hare Yukai". On 15 April 2009, she uploaded a video of herself dancing to "Danjo", a song by Taro that was turned into an Internet meme in Japan. Her video was uploaded to Nico Nico Douga, where it went viral, and she started receiving offers to perform in Japan.

In August 2009, she signed onto the talent agency Life Is So Cruel. Life Is So Cruel suggested Flint to use a stage name to distinguish herself from Japanese television personality Becky, and Flint declined to use her last name. A Japanese producer suggested the stage name "Beckii Cruel" for her, through a combination of one of her nicknames and Life Is So Cruel. Another stage name suggested for her was Beckii Angel, as the agency was in process of creating the girl group Cruel Angels, but Flint decided the stage name Beckii Cruel sounded "cool". After flying to Japan, she performed as a dancer in the finale of Animelo Summer Live 2009. Later, she performed with Taro at the Akihabara Entertainment Festival.

Flint would travel to Japan during school holidays, and she would live stream every Saturday on Nico Nico Douga. Initially, she was brought onto Life Is So Cruel to dance at events, but the management planned on having her pursue a music career. Although Flint had experience in dancing, having taken ballet since she was 4 years old, she underwent vocal training and sought advice from David Holland, an agent who also worked with Samantha Barks.

Flint appeared in an online campaign for Lotte Fit's in November 2009. On 4 November 2009, Flint made her music debut with the release of the two compilation albums No, Ballad Matsuri (の、バラード祭, No, Barādo Matsuri) and No, Upper Matsuri (の、アッパー祭, No, Appā Matsuri), as part of the No, Matsuri (の、祭り) CD series that featured other singers from the Japanese Nico Nico Douga community. No, Ballad Matsuri included the song "Tōi Sora Kumo o Kuguri" (遠い空 雲をくぐり) and No, Upper Matsuri included the song "Danjo"; both songs were duets with Taro, and Flint herself contributed English lyrics to "Tōi Sora Kumo o Kuguri." On 9 December, she released her first idol DVD, This is Beckii Cruel!. It debuted at number 8 on Japan's DVD charts.

By 2010, Flint became the 17th most subscribed user on YouTube in Japan. On 6 January 2010, she made her first appearance on Japanese television on the variety show Jinrui Akiramekaketeita Yume. On 31 January 2010, Flint released a digital single, "Just Wanna Have Some Fun", with "Tokyo Love" as its b-side. In March 2010, Flint made her runway modeling debut when she made a guest appearance at the 10th Tokyo Girls Collection. On 29 April 2010, Flint released her first photo book, All About Beckii. Flint also danced and modeled for promotional events and campaigns for the Japanese theatrical releases of Pretty Cure All Stars DX2: Light of Hope - Protect the Rainbow Jewel! and Wild Child.

On 12 August 2010, BBC Three premiered a documentary about Flint, Beckii: Schoolgirl Superstar at 14. In November, Flint collaborated with Eigo-mimi to produce English conversation learning materials published by ASCII Media Works. Two books, English Listening with Beckii Cruel: Conversations with Friends and English Listening with Beckii Cruel: Conversations at Work, were released with DVDs on 24 December. The DVD for Conversations with Friends included a full-length music video of "Just Wanna Have Some Fun", while the DVD for Conversations at Work included a full-length music video of "Tokyo Love." On 25 December, Flint presented a 15-minute short programme on "Tinsel Takeover", a radio segment on BBC Radio 1.

==== Cruel Angels ====
In October 2009, Flint was announced as a member of Cruel Angels, an international girl group formed by Life Is So Cruel. At the time of the announcement, Cruel Angels consisted of Flint, 18-year-old college student Sarah Cruel from Lyons, and 16-year-old Gemma Cruel from Portsmouth. Flint released a cover of "Tsubasa o Kudasai" (翼をください) with the Cruel Angels as featured artists through the label Tokuma Japan Communications on 10 February 2010. In September 2010, Flint confirmed on Formspring that she withdrew from Cruel Angels and Cruel Angels Project, citing a disagreement with her management in being promoted as a member of Cruel Angels instead of a soloist.

=== 2011–2013: Independent music career ===
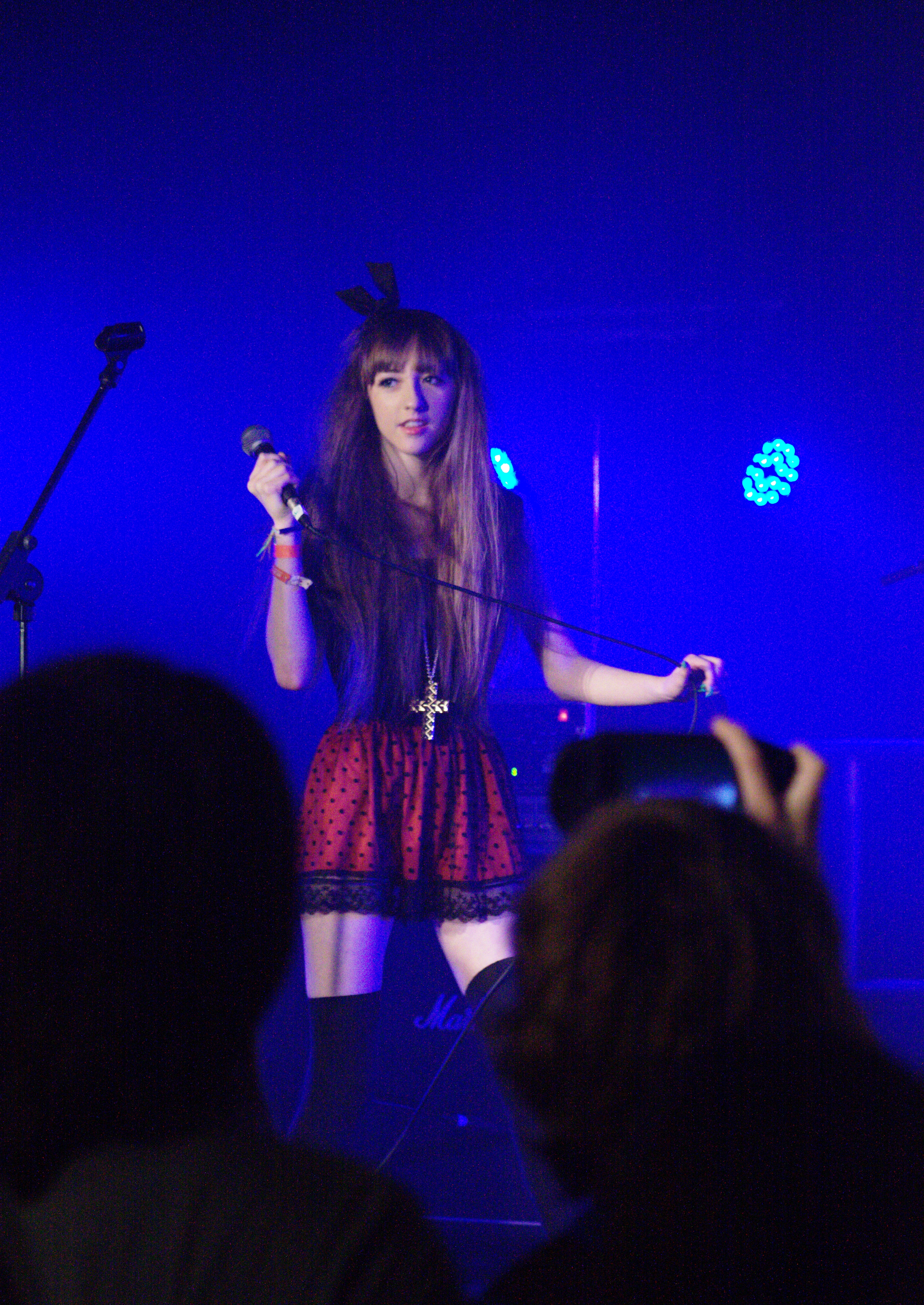
Flint performing at the Brighton Japan Festival and Matsuri in 2012

In 2011, Flint's parents pulled her out of her contract with Life Is So Cruel. She announced her departure from the agency on August 6, 2011 through a Nico Nico Douga live stream. Some of the reasons that she cited for her retirement from the idol industry included unfair contracts and because she had no interest in relocating to Japan.

On 24 October 2011, Flint released "You Can't Kiss Me", her first single in the United Kingdom, on digital platforms, which she also performed at MCM Expo on 29–30 October of the same year. It was produced by Tom Nichols and charted at no. 8 on the Music Week Dance Charts. In 2012, Flint performed at Hyper Japan and Brighton Japan Festival and Matsuri.

In May 2012, Flint and her friend Camille Cora produced their own idol group, Oishii! Ichigo, which consisted of international YouTubers making song-and-dance covers of J-pop songs. In the same month, Flint and Cora also produced the idol group Oishii! Mini Cherries, grouping them as the musical collective Oishii! Project. Flint created the group's outfits, and Oishii! Ichigo released their first EP, Gametime, in December 2012.

On 28 April 2013, Flint was featured on Area 11's single "Shi No Barado." On 15 August 2013, Flint released "Future Fantasy", her first Japanese song in 3 years. In addition, she filmed and posted a self-made documentary titled Beckii Cruel: Independent Idol on her YouTube channel detailing her experience working on the song.

=== 2014–2016: Later YouTube content, focus on fashion, and Bcky Couture ===
Flint's later video content transitioned into fashion and beauty, as well as vlogging. She said she had been inspired to focus on both Japanese and Western fashion trends based on her experience being styled for photo shoots during her idol career in Japan, particularly being in a Liz Lisa shop. On 14 April 2014, Flint launched the clothing line Bcky Couture, with clothes handmade by herself. Since 2014, she has made appearances at Summer in the City. On 28 September 2014, she made a guest appearance at Moshi Moshi Nippon Festival 2014 as a model.

On 17 May 2015, Flint collaborated with artist Jeremy Boydell to release the clothing line "Bcky × SlimGiltSoul". She appeared as a guest at Bandai Namco's panel at the 2015 Tokyo Game Show. In May 2016, Flint became a kawaii reporter for the television program NHK World Kawaii International on NHK World. In the same month, she said through an interview with BuzzFeed Japan that she was no longer active in Japan, nor is she producing content in Japanese, due to her lack of fluency in the language. She confirmed in an interview with Dazed that she was no longer performing as a singer due to anxiety.

=== 2016–present: Pepper Studio and other business ventures ===
After moving to London, in December 2016, Flint became the creator community manager for the marketing company Social Circle and also appeared at Summer in the City as a representative. In December 2017, she gave evidence to the House of Lords Select Committee on Communications for their inquiry into the advertising industry.

Flint acted as a judge for the Social Media Marketing Awards in 2018 and 2019, as well as for the Influencer Marketing Awards in 2021. In March 2019, Flint co-founded Pepper Studio, an influencer marketing agency in London. Representing Pepper Studio, Flint has spoken to the media and at events about influencer marketing, including The Drum, Moneybox Live, The Today Programme, and The World Tonight. She has spoken at events including Social Day and Digital Woman.

In 2021, Flint was a recipient of Forbes 30 Under 30 Europe: Media & Marketing and appeared on the "How to earn a living on social media" episode of The Media Show on BBC News and BBC Radio 4.

== Public image ==
In Japan, Flint became an example of a net idol and was given the media nickname "impossibly cute" (かわいいにもほどがある). Flint cites one of her dance inspirations as Kozue Aikawa. From a young age, she was also inspired by Japanese fashion trends from magazines such as Popteen and Seventeen. She took lessons in Japanese, but has not attained fluency. Manga artist Hideo Nishimoto also included a cameo appearance of Flint in his manga series Mou, Shimasen Kara .

== Discography ==
=== Singles ===
==== As lead artist ====
Year	Title	Peak chart positions		Album
Year	Title	JP	UK	Album
2010	"Just Wanna Have Some Fun"	—	—	Non-album single
2010	"Tsubasa o Kudasai" (翼をください) (Beckii Cruel feat. Cruel Angels)	84	—	Non-album single
2011	"You Can't Kiss Me"	—	—	Non-album single
2013	"Future Fantasy"	—	—	Non-album single
"—" denotes single that did not chart or was not released.

==== As featured artist ====
Year	Title	Peak chart positions			Album
Year	Title	UK	UK Indie	UK Breakers	Album
2013	"Shi No Barado" (Area 11 feat. Beckii Cruel)	115	12	1	All the Lights in the Sky
"—" denotes single that did not chart or was not released.

== Videography ==
=== Solo DVDs ===
List of solo DVDs, with selected chart positions, sales figures and certifications
Title	Year	Details	Peak chart positions	Sales
Title	Year	Details	JPN	Sales
This is Beckii Cruel	2010	Released: 9 December 2009; Label: Tokuma Japan Communications; Formats: DVD	54	—
"—" denotes releases that did not chart or were not released in that region.

=== Television ===
Year	Title	Role	Network	Notes
2009	Beckii Cruel: Schoolgirl Superstar at 14	Herself	BBC Three	Documentary
2016	NHK World Kawaii International	Herself	NHK World	Kawaii leader

== Publications ==
=== Photobooks ===
Year	Title	Publisher	ISBN
2010	Beckii Cruel Photo Book: All About Beckii (ベッキー・クルーエルPHOTO BOOK「まるごとベッキー」)	Wani Books	ISBN 978-4-84-704262-1

=== Textbooks ===
Year	Title	Publisher	ISBN
2010	English Listening with Beckii Cruel: Conversations with Friends (ベッキー・クルーエルde英語耳 友だちとの会話編)	ASCII Media Works	ISBN 978-4-04-870092-4
2010	English Listening with Beckii Cruel: Conversations at Work (ベッキー・クルーエルde英語耳 仕事での会話編』)	ASCII Media Works	ISBN 978-4-04-870093-1
