= Modern synthesis (disambiguation) =

Modern synthesis is a group of theories in evolutionary biology.

Modern synthesis may also refer to:

- Modern synthesis (20th century), a combination of Darwin's theory of evolution with natural selection and Mendel's findings on heredity
- Modern Synthesis, a 2016 album by English rock band Area 11

== See also ==
- Synthesis (disambiguation)
