= Misha Janette =

American fashion journalist

- Born: December 1, 1983 (age 42); Spokane, Washington, U.S.
- Education: Bunka Fashion College in Tokyo in 2007
- Occupation: Fashion designer
- Known for: edgy, avant-garde fashion
- Label: Plumb (wigs)
- Website: Tokyo Fashion Diaries

Misha Janette (born December 1, 1983) is an American fashion journalist, fashion director and fashion blogger, based in Tokyo. She is best known for her unique personal style, that has made her a fashion personality in Japan.

== Early life and education ==
She was born Michelle Janette Fleming in Spokane, Washington.

Janette graduated from Bunka Fashion College in Tokyo in 2007. "I was apprehensive about going to New York because it actually seemed so ... stereotypical. If I was going to be working from the dirt on up anyway, I decided I might as well start somewhere really left-field and make it interesting."

== Career ==
She started her career as a fashion journalist after graduation, working for The Japan Times as lead fashion writer. She has also contributed to Kyodo News, Numéro Tokyo, Vogue Girl Japan, The Guardian, The Sydney Morning Herald, Wallpaper, CNN Travel, and covers Tokyo Fashion Week for style.com.

Her blog was chosen in 2011 as one of Tokyo's top-ten fashion blogs by Vogue Japan and she was awarded with a window display at Isetan department store.

She is known for her highly particular taste in edgy, avant-garde fashion. This has led to her working as a stylist for celebrities including actress and musician Nicki Minaj, actress Rinko Kikuchi, and philosopher Shimoda Kageki. She has hosted the television show Kawaii International on the NHK World network from the show's premiere in 2012, through its series finale in 2021. In 2012, she owns and designs a wig brand called Plumb.

In 2012, she was chosen as one of the "power people" from Tokyo for Seibu Shibuya department store campaign, along with Patricia Field. Shot by celebrity photographer Leslie Kee. In the same year, Janette collaborated with Coach on a custom "legacy" bag as a fashion influencer and auctioned for charity. She was the only blogger flown from Japan to attend the 12-13 AW Milan Fashion Week as a guest of Gucci with a trip to its factory in Florence. She was invited as a top global blogger to the Prada Tokyo show with Rumi Neely, Bryanboy, Susie Bubble, and Dane Pernet. The photo report was featured on Prada.com (2012).

In 2013, she was chosen as the Japan representative blogger for the Furla #CandyCool project, with a documentary and custom bag that was to be released in February 2014 during Milan Fashion Week. In the same year, Janette was flown to the Elle Bangkok Fashion Week 2013 as a power influencer from Japan.

Since 2013, she has written a monthly column, "Life in the 2.5 Dimension" in the Japanese fashion magazine Soen. She is also asked to DJ at fashion events and clubs, such as the Opening Ceremony third-anniversary event in Tokyo. She has collaborated with Furla on the #candycool project, making a bag and documentary video.

Janette started a blog Tokyo Fashion Diaries, in 2011 following the Great Hanshin earthquake; the blog is written in English, Japanese, and Chinese. It is a platform for her artistic fashion photo shoots she styles as a fashion director, and as a journalist, she follows both Japanese and Western fashion with a leaning towards avant-garde runways and independent designers.

At the beginning, I was thinking about creating a blog to introduce Japanese fashion to people outside Japan. But the information on young designers that I write about in my blog are often not covered by Japanese magazines, and I wanted Japanese people to know about them too, so I decided to make my blog bilingual. She has since risen to become one of the most prominent fashion bloggers in Japan.

== See also ==
- List of people from Spokane, Washington
