= KYX =

- Formerly: KYX World
- Company type: Private company
- Industry: E-commerce
- Founded: June 2021; 4 years ago
- Founders: Brian Mupo, Steve Dorfman
- Headquarters: Los Angeles, CA, United States
- Services: Sneaker sale and rental
- Total assets: $16 million (2022)
- Number of employees: 11-50 (2022)
- Website: kyxsneakers.com

KYX, previously known as KYX World, is an American e-commerce platform known for facilitating the rental and purchase of aftermarket and limited-release sneakers to end consumers.

KYX was co-founded by entrepreneurs Brian Mupo and Steve Dorfman who launched the company in June 2021. The for-profit LLC is headquartered in Los Angeles, California. In January 2023, the company decided to end the offering of their subscription rental service, announcing so by publishing on their website's homepage.

== History ==
Conversations regarding the generation of a sneaker rental service began between the co-founders Brian Mupo and Steve Dorfman in June 2020. Mupo stated that the duo's goal in creating the service was to " take an industry that's traditionally exclusive and make it an inclusive community" through providing non-committal access to authentic and hype-garnering footwear. KYX was the inaugural online sneaker subscription service, with competitors such as Teneez, LSWOP, Onrotate, and Loan My Sole following in the market with similar business models. The founders saw it important to provide an alternative to consumers unable to afford the purchasing prices on secondary sneaker marketplaces.

Limited-release Nike sneakers on display at a resale store. KYX specialized in renting out popular, after-market models like the ones seen above.

Within KYX's first 9 months of operation, the company experienced month-over-month double-digit growth in subscriber count. KYX has generated $4.8 million in external funding over three seed rounds; at its height in February 2022, the company was estimated to be worth over $16 million by venture capital firm and KYX investor SeventySix Capital. KYX also asserts several sports-adjacent public figures as investors, such as Chicago Bulls power forward DeMar DeRozan and former NFL wide receiver Emmanuel Sanders.

At the height of their operations, the company had over 400 product offerings available for rental and purchase, with a subscriber base that was 75% male and 25% female.

In March 2022, KYX unveiled an extensive brand refresh including updates to the company's technical and communicative strategies. In addition to changing the service's name (formerly known as KYX World), a sleek, more gender-neutral design was adapted in hopes to "appeal to a wider audience outside of traditional 'sneakerheads'". The company also implemented new website features, including a real-time sneaker shipment tracker and KYX Tokens, a proprietary web-based currency intended to be used to purchase sneakers on their platform.

Despite the company's $16 million valuation by the Wall Street Journal in 2022 and the execution of successful marketing campaigns utilizing several major influencers in the sneaker industry, KYX announced in January 2023 via their website their decision to end their subscription sneaker rental service, as stated by the sneaker-oriented news and media company Sole Retriever Despite this announcement, KYX's social media presence remains (on Instagram, Facebook, and LinkedIn platforms), with the most recent content being posted on January 3, 2023. This has led to speculation regarding an eventual return of the service by satisfied customers or a potential pivot in the business' primary operations.

== Notes on the After-Market Sneaker Industry ==
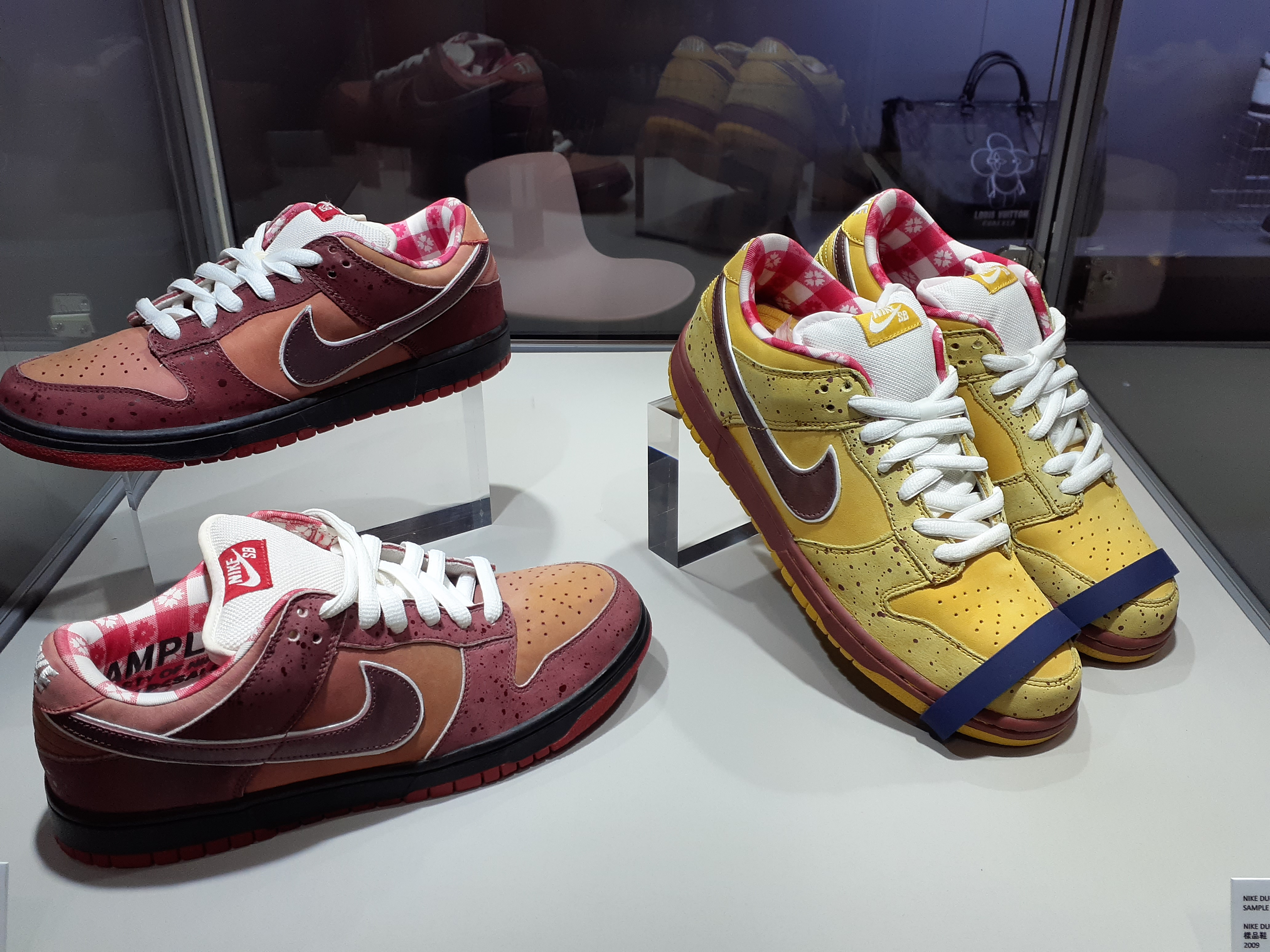
Two sample pairs of Nike Dunk SB Low sneakers auctioned off through Cult Canvas, a selective online auction hosted by international broker Sotheby's. The rare nature of these pairs caused both lots to sell for over USD $40,000 combined.

Statista finds the global sneaker industry to be valued at $72.2 billion as of 2022, and projects its revenue to reach 106.6 billion by 2027. The market is projected to experience a 5.34% compound annual growth rate (CAGR) between 2023 and 2027. Growth in the sneaker industry can be attributed to the ascendance of athleisure and sports lifestyle brands, representing the increasing consumer demand for more comfortable, cutting edge footwear and continental-wide disposable income.

Sociologist Yuniya Kawamura describes the rise of sneakers as cultural assets by three signifiers: the emergence of hip hop, commodification through celebrity endorsement, and the digital age's allowance of digital marketing and reselling. Digital connectivity has resulted in increasing consumer-to-consumer (C2C) exchanges made possible by secondary online marketplaces, such as StockX, GOAT, and FlightClub.

== Business Model ==
Modeling their offering after the subscription fashion service Rent the Runway, KYX provided consumers with multiple tiers of membership, each with a different monthly fee and correlatingly-limited access to sneakers of particular valuations.

The base subscription tier (last priced at $49) allowed the rental of one pair of sneakers at a time with up to a $300 current value on the resale market. The second level of subscription, most-recently costing users $129, allowed rental of two pairs concurrently with a total resale market valuation of $650. This level also allowed for unlimited swaps throughout the month. The ultimate tier (last priced at $599/monthly) allowed for consecutive rental of four sneakers with unlimited swaps within the monthly billing cycle and unlimited access to the service's sneaker offerings. Tiers also differed on their allowed access to brand-new pairs, with lower levels limited to "lightly-worn" pairs. Throughout the lifecycle of KYX's operation, tiers have been defined differently based on their internal sneaker library and external consumer demand. At the end of their rental period, members had the option to purchase the sneakers they've rented at a discounted rate (last noted as 15% off of KYX's established resell value).

KYX acquired inventory by purchasing from secondary marketplaces throughout operation, with Mupo expressing the company's desire to eventually forge direct partnerships with footwear manufacturers for inventory acquisition in a 2022 interview with the Wall Street Journal. When inventory is returned, the company followed a rigorous, 10-step cleaning process in partnership with cleaning service provider and cleaning product retailer Reshoevn8r. To current knowledge, the company has not commented on their intentions with inventory that was no longer in rentable condition.
