= Bunka Gakuen University =

Private university in Shinjuku, Tokyo, Japan

Coordinates: 35°41′07″N 139°41′40″E

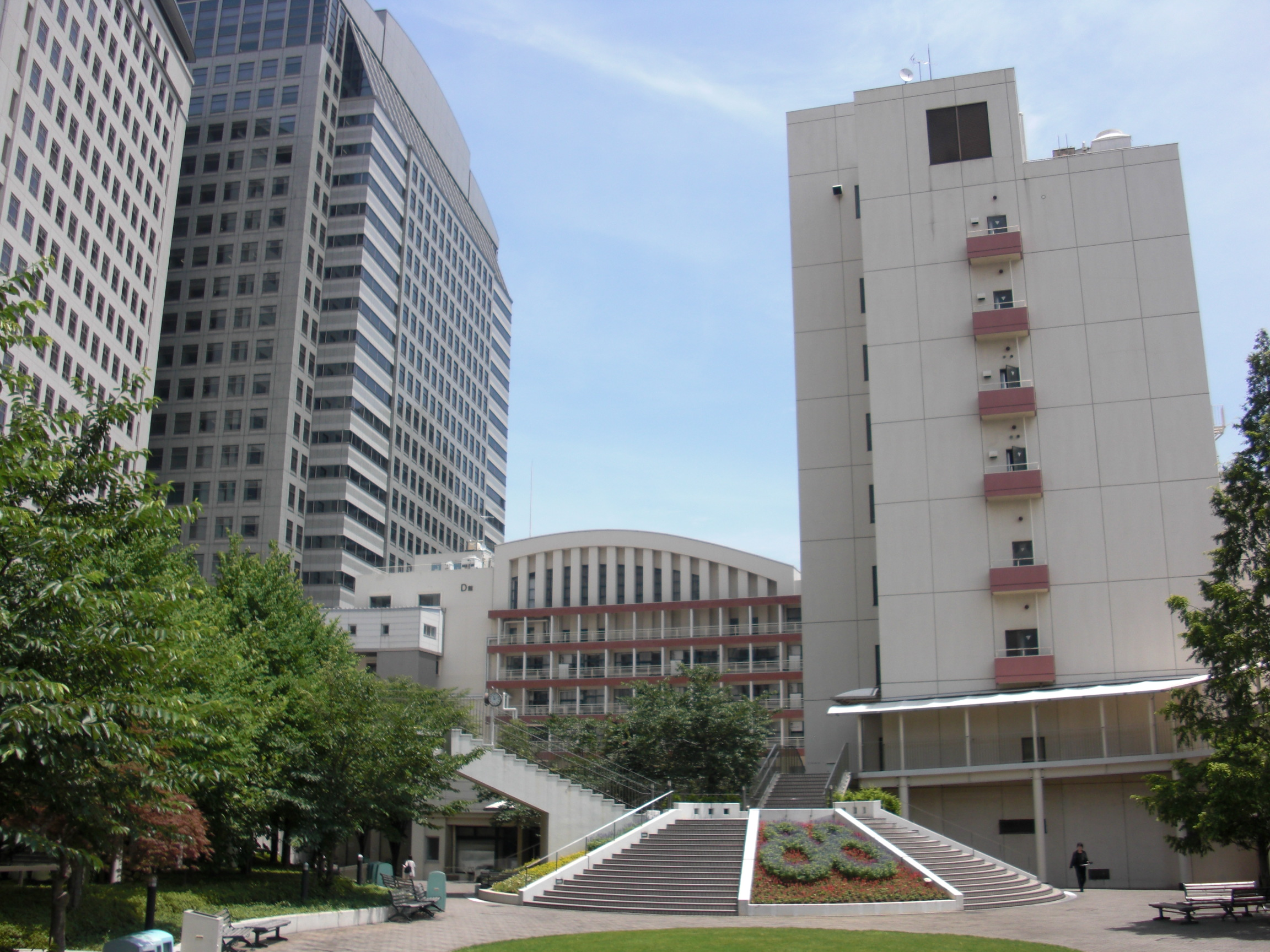
- New Metropolitan Tokyo Campus
- Type: Private
- Established: 1919
- Founder: Bunka Gakuen School Corporation
- Location: 3 Chome-22-1 Yoyogi, Shibuya City, Tokyo 151-8523, Japan, Shibuya, Tokyo, Japan

Bunka Gakuen University (文化学園大学, Bunka gakuen daigaku) is a private university in Shinjuku, Tokyo, Japan. The predecessor of the school, a women's vocational school, was founded 1923. In 1952 it was chartered as a junior women's college. In 1964 it became a four-year college and it was named Bunka Women's University (文化女子大学, Bunka joshi daigaku). In 2011 it changed its name "Bunka Gakuen University".

== History ==
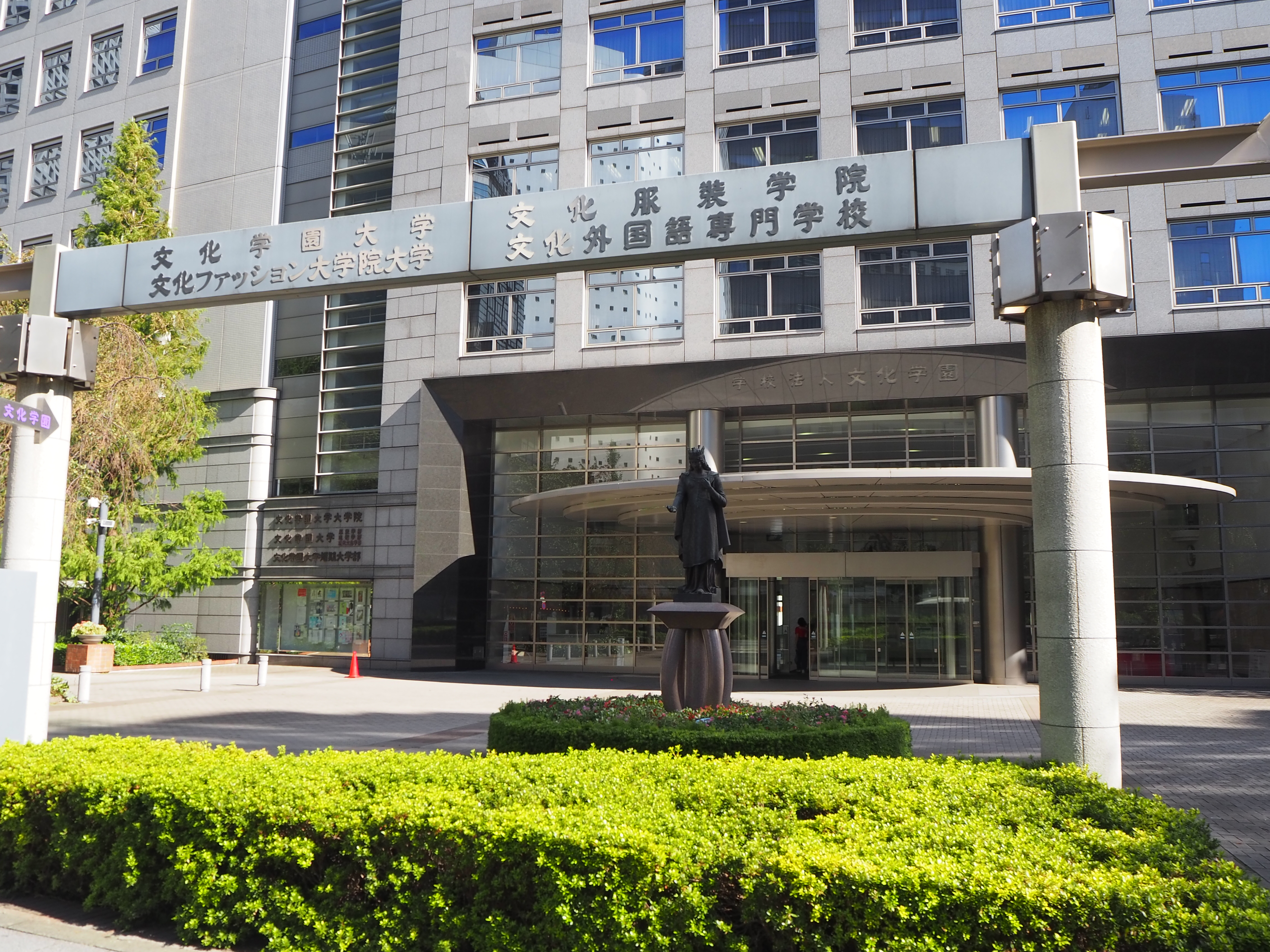
The shared entrance to both the university and the Bunka Fashion College

Bunka Gakuen University is a part of a large conglomerate of institutions including the Bunka Fashion College within the same campus in Shinjuku, Tokyo. In 2012 Bunka Gakuen University and Bunka Fashion College opened a Masters level course in Fashion Studies aimed at foreign students. This course is called the Global Fashion Concentration and is taught completely in English.

== Main campus ==
The university's main campus is in the western part of Tokyo's Shinjuku neighborhood. The main building is 21 stories tall, and includes facilities such as a library, costume museum, and a resource center. The main campus is about an 8-minute walk from JR Shinjuku Station and about a 3-minute walk from the #6 exit of the Toei Shinjuku subway station.

The campus is shared with 4 colleges and universities from Bunka Gakuen. The other 3 institutions are Bunka Fashion College, Bunka Fashion Graduate University, and Bunka Institute of Language.

== Affiliated Primary and Secondary Schools ==
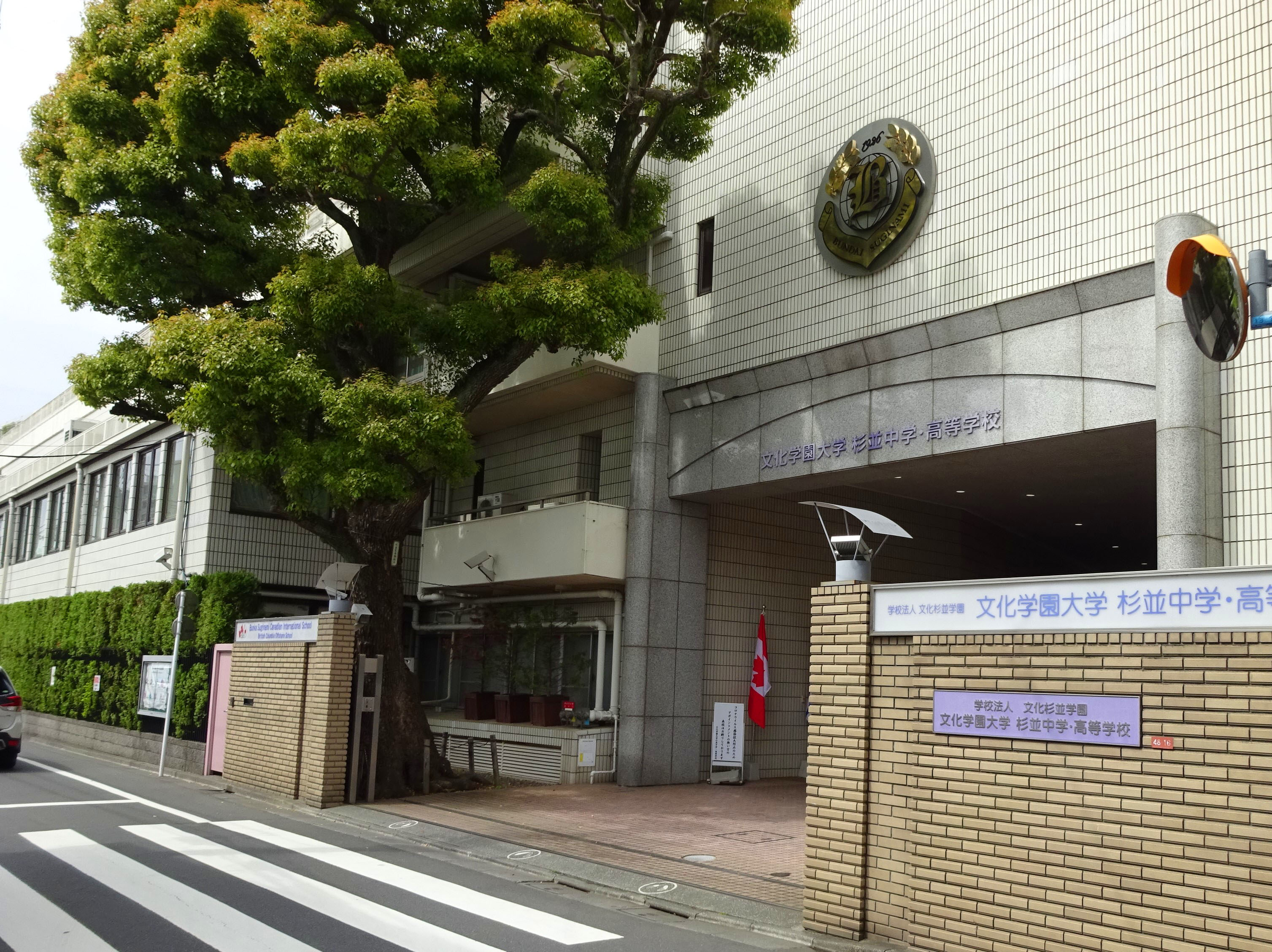
The entrance to Bunka Suginami Canadian International School and Bunka Gakuen Junior and Senior High Schools

- Bunka Gakuen University Suginami Junior and Senior High School (Was renamed from Bunka Women's University Suginami Junior and Senior High School in 2011)
- Bunka Suginami Canadian International School (BSCIS) (This British Columbia Offshore School was established in 2015 and runs a double diploma program with the afformentioned private school in Suginami, Tokyo)
- Bunka Gakuen Nagano Junior and Senior High School (The name of the school was changed from Bunka Women's University Nagano High School to Bunka Gakuen Nagano High School in 2011, and the junior high school opened on April 1, 2014)
- Bunka Gakuen Nagano Senmon Gakko
- Bunka Gakuen University Violet Kindergarten
- Bunka Gakuen University Kindergarten
