= Yuniya Kawamura =

Fashion author

Yuniya (Yuni) Kawamura is a fashion sociologist and professor in the Department of Social Sciences at the Fashion Institute of Technology (FIT) at the New York State University. Her research focuses on the sociology of fashion and the relationship between fashion systems and cultural production. Kawamura is known for her work on the concept of “fashion-ology” and for her studies of Japanese fashion subcultures and their global circulation.

== Education ==
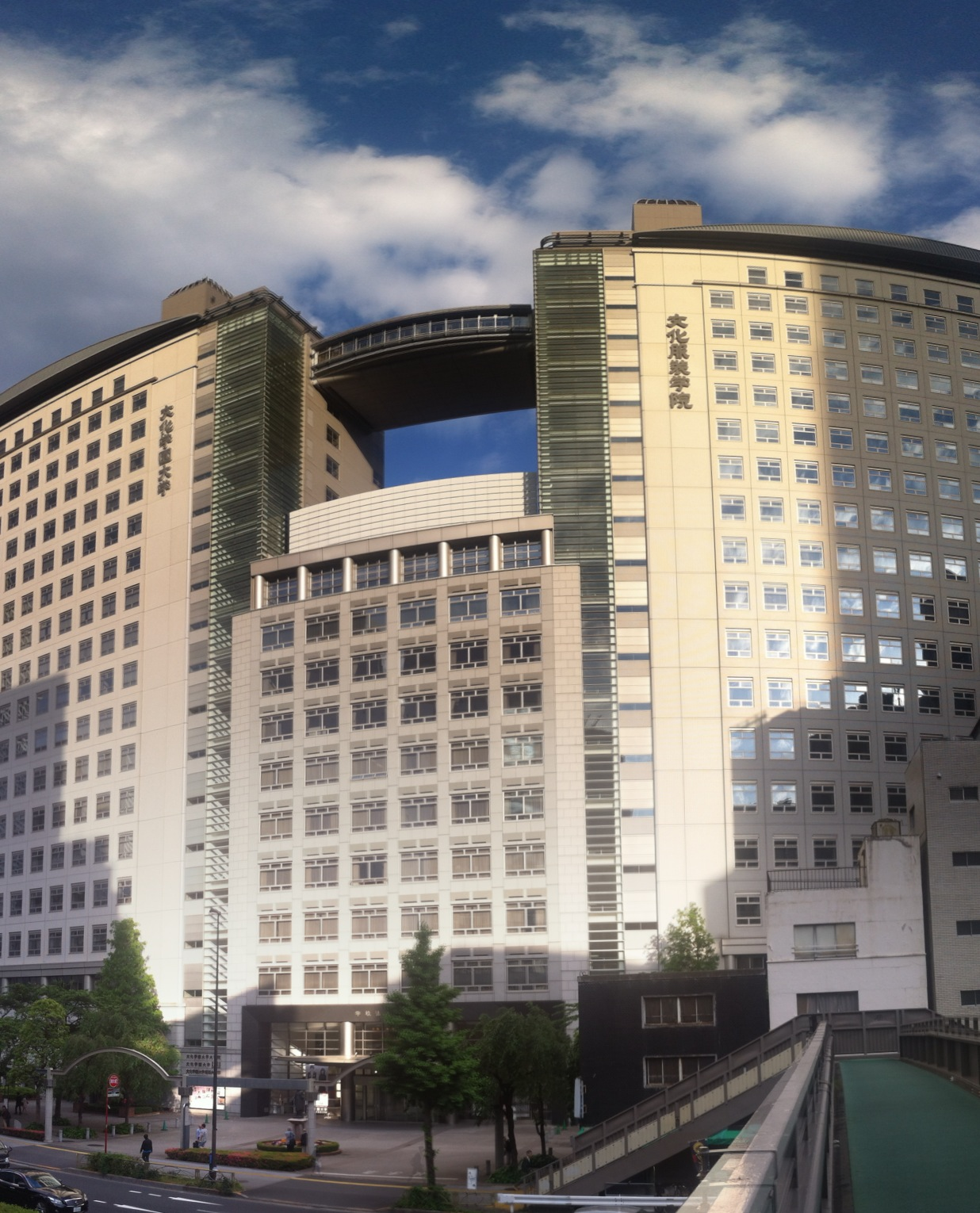
Bunka Fashion College

Yuniya Kawamura received early training in fashion design. She studied at the Bunka Fashion College in Tokyo and later undertook professional fashion design training at Kingston University and the Fashion Institute of Technology (FIT) in New York.

Kawamura later pursued academic studies in sociology. She received a bachelor's degree from Sophia University in Japan and subsequently obtained both a master's degree and a PhD in sociology from Columbia University. Her doctoral research later formed the basis of her book Fashion-ology, which examines fashion from a sociological perspective.

== Academic work and theory ==
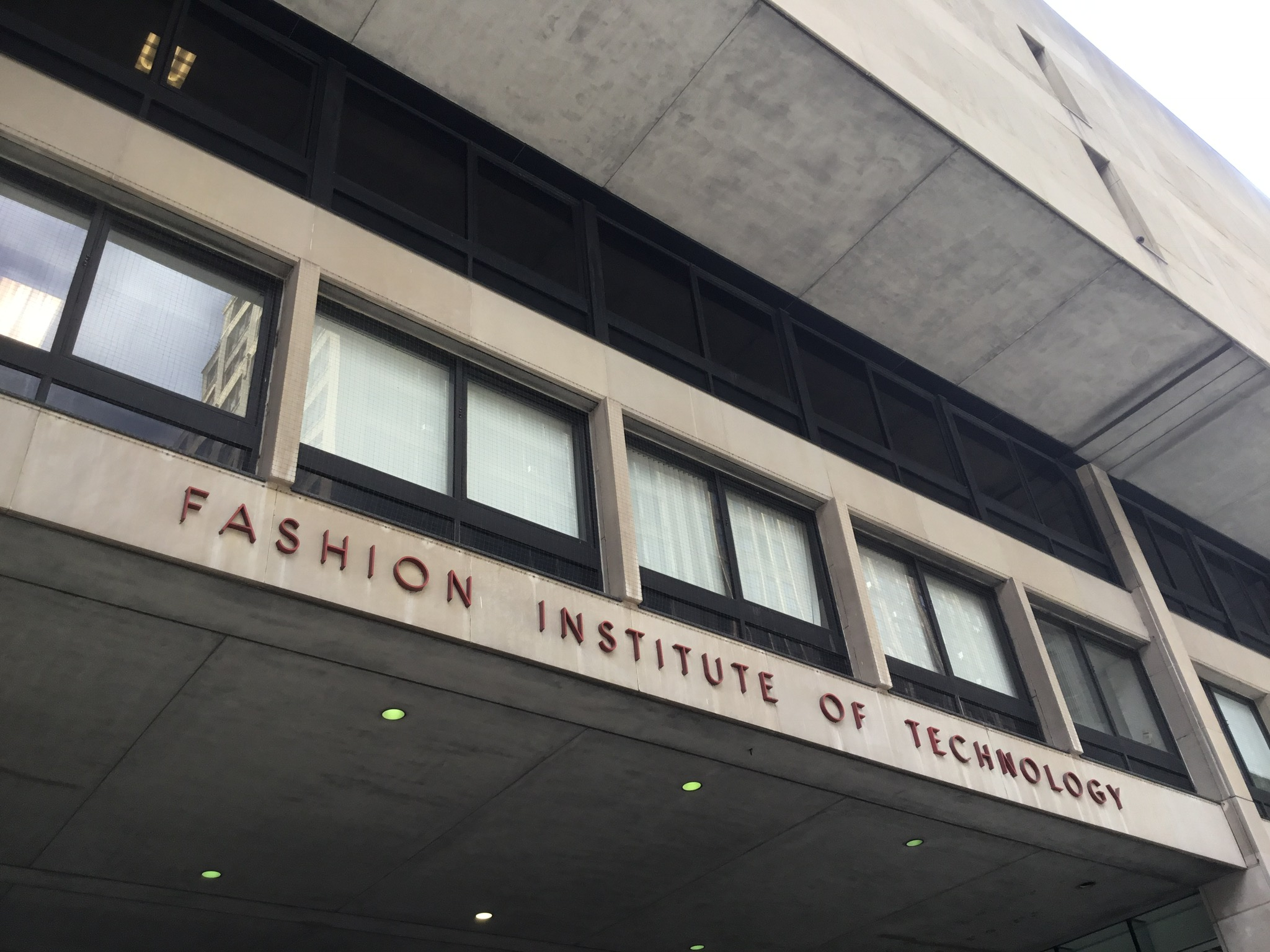
Fashion Institute of Technology

One of Yuniya Kawamura’s major scholarly contributions is the concept of “fashion-ology,” which approaches fashion as an institutionalised social system. In her work, Kawamura distinguishes between clothing and fashion, arguing that clothing refers to garments themselves, while fashion refers to a social process through which certain styles become recognised and circulated within a fashion system.

Her book Fashion-ology: An Introduction to Fashion Studies develops this framework and examines fashion from a sociological perspective. The book has been translated into several languages, including Italian, Swedish, Russian, Chinese, Turkish, and Korean, and has been published in multiple editions, with a third edition released in 2023 that expands the discussion of fashion in the digital era.

== Research on Japanese fashion and subcultures ==
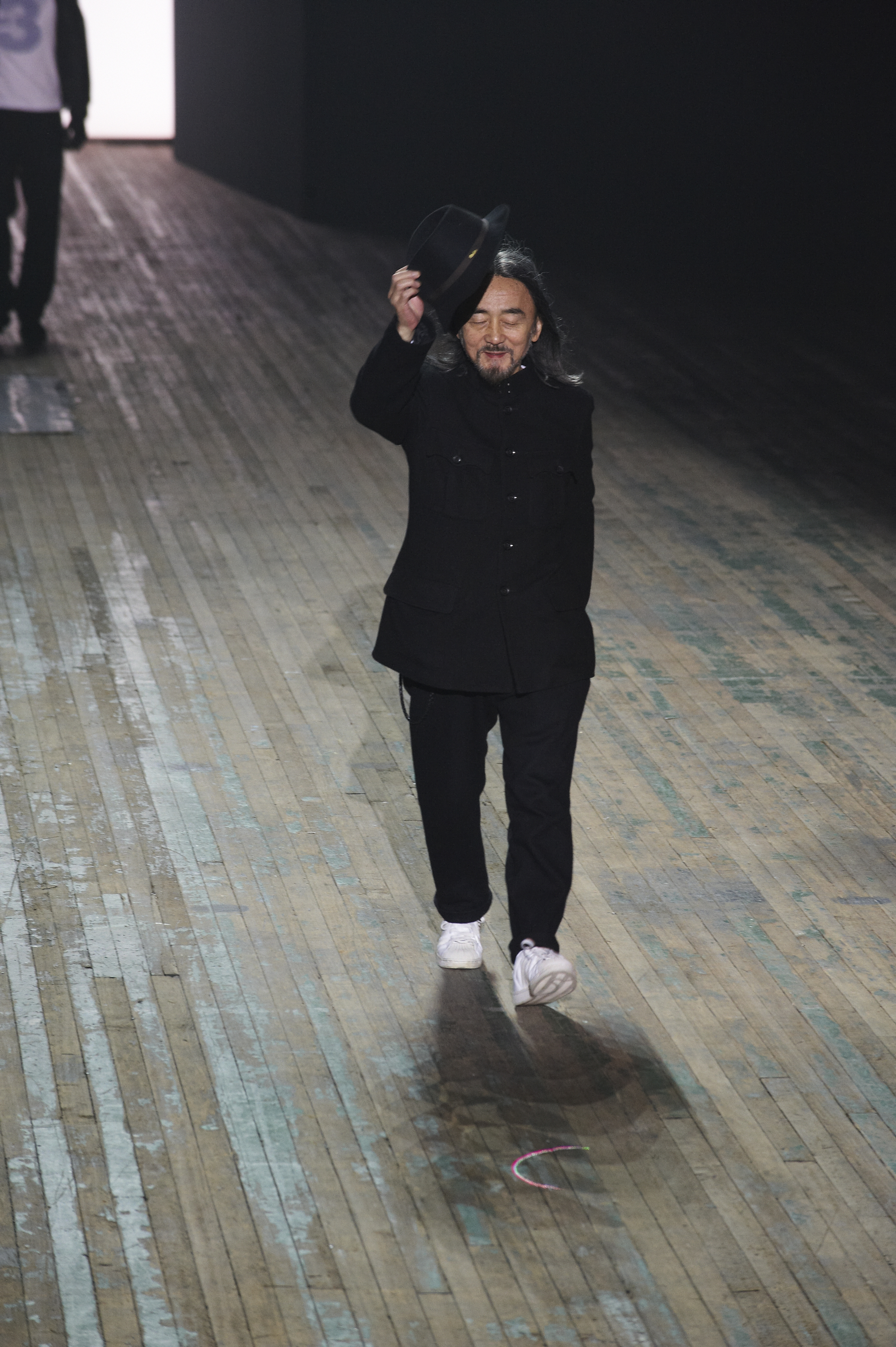
Yohji Yamamoto

Yuniya Kawamura has conducted extensive research on the interaction between Japanese fashion and global cultural systems. Her work frequently examines how Japanese fashion and youth subcultures have influenced fashion discourse in Europe and North America.

In The Japanese Revolution in Paris Fashion (2004), Kawamura analyses how Japanese designers such as Kenzo Takada, Issey Miyake, Yohji Yamamoto, and Rei Kawakubo challenged and reshaped the conventions of the Paris fashion system.

Kawamura has also written extensively on Japanese youth subcultures and street fashion. Her book Fashioning Japanese Subcultures (2012; revised edition 2025) examines styles such as Lolita fashion and Harajuku “Decora”, analysing their social meanings and international reception. She has also written about the growing popularity of Harajuku fashion and Lolita fashion in the United States.

== Other research topics ==
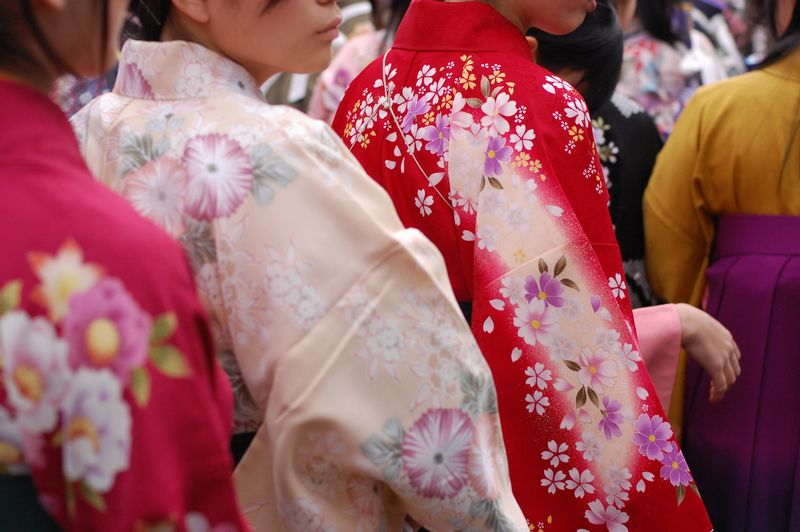
kimono

Kawamura’s research also addresses a range of topics in the sociology of fashion.

She co-authored Cultural Appropriation in Fashion and Entertainment (2022), which examines issues of cultural borrowing and power dynamics in creative industries. Her work has also explored differing perspectives on the use of Japanese cultural symbols such as the kimono in Western artistic contexts.

In Sneakers: Fashion, Gender, and Subculture (2016), Kawamura analyses the cultural history of sneaker culture, tracing its development from urban youth culture in the Bronx to its global commercialisation.

She has also examined the reinterpretation of traditional Japanese crafts in contemporary fashion, including research on sashiko embroidery and its transformation from a symbol of rural poverty into a valued aesthetic practice in modern fashion.

== Awards and recognition ==
Kawamura received the International Fashion Science Award from the International Foundation of Fashion Science (IFSA) in 2026 in recognition of her contributions to the study of fashion.

She has also received the State University of New York Chancellor’s Award for Excellence in Teaching (2006–2007) and the Fashion Institute of Technology Faculty Excellence Award (2018–2019).

== Bibliography ==
- Fashion-ology: An Introduction to Fashion Studies (2005)
- Fashioning Japanese Subcultures (2012)
- The Japanese Revolution in Paris Fashion (2003)
- Cultural Appropriation in Fashion and Entertainment (2022)
- Sneakers: Fashion, Gender, and Subculture (2016)
- Sebastian Masuda (2025)
