= Asami Kiyokawa =

Japanese embroidery artist

Asami Kiyokawa (Japanese: 清川 あさみ) is an embroidery artist from Japan who creates colorful designs over photographs using a needle and thread. She has collaborated with a wide variety of celebrities in Japan including rock star Miyavi, musical group AKB48, poet Shuntaro Tanikawa and footballer Atsuto Uchida. In 2012 her exhibition in Omotesando Hills attracted a crowd of 55,000 people.

== Background ==
Kiyokawa was born in Awaji Island, Hyogo, Japan in 1980. She moved to Tokyo in the late 1990s and was soon scouted by a modeling agency. Kiyokawa modeled while studying at Bunka Fashion College.

== Career ==
Kiyokawa received the Best Debutant Award in 2004. The following year she designed the cover for Kaela Kimura's CD Real Life, Real Heart.

She worked with a number of female celebrities such as Aya Ueto, Masami Nagasawa and Meisa Kuroki in the series "Bijo Saishu" - a collection of books celebrating the beauty of the female form. In addition to her collaborations with celebrities, she worked with brands including Swarovski, Cartier, UNIQLO, Lexus and Gap Inc. Recently she has been involved in projects with Lux and Starbucks.

In 2012 she picked up an award as one of Vogue Japan's "Women of the Year". A year later she published her first male collection. Known simply as Danshi, she collaborated with stars like Atsuto Ichida, Exile's Takahiro and singer Nobuaki Kaneko.

In 2014 she completed her first exhibition abroad. She went to Milan, Italy where she exhibited a merry-go-round as well as work from her new book Himitsu. She has recently presented TV talk shows.

== Publications ==
- Bijo Saishu - Female Beauty Collection (2006- )
- Caico (2008)
- AKB48 X Bijo Saishu - Beauty Collection of AKB48 (2010)
- Danshi - Men's Collection (2013)
- Himitsu - Secret (2014)

=== Picture books ===
- Shiawase no Ouji - Happy Prince (2006)
- Ningyo Hime - The Little Mermaid (2007)
- Ginga Tetsudou no Yoru - Night on the Milky Way Railway (2009)
- Mou Hitostu No Basho - Another Place (2011)
- Kami sama wa iru? Inai ka? Is there a God or not? (2012)
- Gusukobudori no denki - Biography of Gusukobudori (2012)
- Kodomo Heya no Alice - Alice in the Nursery (2013)
