= Area 11 (band) =

English rock band

- Area 11 logo

Background information
- Origin: Nottingham, England
- Genres: Alternative rock, progressive metal, glam rock, pop-punk, electronicore
- Years active: 2010–2023 (2025 officially)
- Labels: Cooking Vinyl, Smihilism Records, Breaking the Boredom
- Members: Tom Clarke (Sparkles*); Alex Parvis (Parv); Jonathan Kogan (Kogie); Leo Taylor
- Past members: Luke Owens; Tim Yearsley
- Website: http://www.area11.band/

Area 11 were an English rock band from Nottingham, England. The band consisted of four members: Thomas "Sparkles*" Clarke, Alex Parvis, Jonathan Kogan and Leo Taylor. To date, they have released a number of singles and EPs, and three studio albums.

The band's sound is heavy with minimal synthesizers and electronic effects that they call modern rock, however in their earlier records, Area 11's sound commonly blended heavy metal guitar riffs with a wider more prominent range of synthesizers and electronic effects, which they sometimes referred to as gaijin rock. Meaning "foreigner rock" in Japanese, this is a title that also relates to the band's musical origins when their style was notably influenced by anime and J-rock.

== Biography ==
Area 11 consisted of Tom Clarke, Alex Parvis, Jonathan Kogan, and Leo Taylor. They formed on 8 October 2010 in Nottingham during what was described by band frontman Sparkles* as a "disastrous jam session". Founding members Sparkles*, Luke, and Alex then discovered their shared love of anime whilst watching Code Geass episode 22 "Blood Stained Euphy", from which they wrote their first song, "Euphemia."

The name "Area 11" is a reference to the anime Code Geass, as Japan is referred to as Area 11 in the series, with its citizens referred to as Elevens, a name which has come to collectively describe Area 11 fans. In fact, some of Area 11's songs are based on various anime, including Code Geass, Death Note, Tengen Toppa Gurren Lagann, Naruto, Elfen Lied, Bakuman, Fullmetal Alchemist due to the band's strong fondness of the genre at the time of recording their earlier records. Towards the end of recording their debut album, All the Lights in the Sky, the band decided that they had done all they wanted in terms of writing songs about anime, and stopped writing songs about the animation genre, wanting to explore original new ideas and concepts.

The band has been commissioned to produce music for companies such as YouTube broadcasting group The Yogscast and Namco Bandai Games. Significantly for Namco Bandai Games, they produced "GO!! Fighting Action Power" as the credits theme for their Bravoman web-series on ShiftyLook, and later "Wonder Wars" as the theme song for the Wonder Momo anime series.

On 1 October 2024, the band announced on their Patreon page that work had begun on a new record following "a little break" - telling fans that any updates on the project would be posted to the same page. In this time, they recorded "over 20" demos intended to be included on the record, but felt that their efforts were inadequate - stating, "we pushed on, but increasingly started feeling very lost in the process" in a later post on the same Patreon page.

The band would eventually announce on 10 January 2026 that, following a meeting a couple of weeks prior, they had decided to go on an "official hiatus" - citing their lack of passion, members' involvement in other projects, and the fact that they had all moved to different cities as the main factors for their decision. In the same announcement, they stated that they were not ruling out the possibility of a reunion in the future, but expressed the members' desire to focus on personal projects, saying "we didn’t want to put out a bunch of lacklustre music we didn’t love just to continue the band".

== Musical style ==
The band's sound consists mostly of heavy guitars (including 7-stringed guitars) but also makes subtle use of synthesisers, orchestral sections and electronic effects. In contrast, many songs contain acoustic instruments such as acoustic guitars and emotional piano melodies.

In their earlier records, Area 11's sound commonly blended rock and metal styles of guitar with aspects of Japanese music including J-pop, this sound they referred to by the tongue-in-cheek name, gaijin rock as "gaijin" in Japanese means "foreigner", "a fusion of pop-punk, metal, prog, and glam fortified by a major obsession with anime, video games, and Japanese comics."

== Members ==
=== Current members ===
- Tom 'Sparkles*' Clarke – lead vocals, keyboards (2010–present)
- Alex 'Parv' Parvis – guitar, backing vocals (2010–present)
- Jonathan 'Kogie' Kogan – bass, saxophone, backing vocals (2011–present)
- Leo Taylor – drums, percussion, backing vocals (2010–present)

=== Past members ===
- Luke Owens – guitar, backing vocals (2010–2012)
- Tim Yearsley – bass (2010–2011)

== Discography ==
=== Studio albums ===
Title	Album details	Peak chart positions					
Title	Album details	UK	UK Rock	UK Indie	UK Break	US Heat	US Indie
All the Lights in the Sky	Released: 31 January 2013; Label: Smihilism Records; Format: CD, Digital download	75	10	10	2	11	42
Modern Synthesis	Released: 1 July 2016; Label: Smihilism Records (Cooking Vinyl); Format: CD, Digital download, LP	27	2	9	—	—	—
Singlarity	Released: 18 December 2020; Label: Smihilism Records; Format: CD, Digital download	—	—	—	—	—	—
"—" denotes a recording that did not chart or was not released in that territory.

=== Live albums ===
Title	Album details
Everybody Gets a Piece Tour	Released: 24 March 2019; Label: Smihilism Records; Format: Digital download

=== Extended plays ===
Title	EP details
Blackline	Released: 3 September 2011; Label: Breaking the Boredom; Format: CD, Digital download
Underline	Released: 2 November 2014; Label: Smihilism Records; Format: CD, Digital download
Let It Resonate	Released: 9 December 2016; Label: Smihilism Records; Format: CD, Digital download
Cassandra Rising	Released: 31 January 2019; Label: Smihilism Records; Format: CD, Digital download
Cover Girls	Released: 30 September 2019; Label: Smihilism Records; Format: Digital download
Not That Christmassy UK Christmas Number Ones	Released: 25 December 2019; Label: Smihilism Records; Format: Digital download
Fan Subs	Released: 25 April 2020; Label: Smihilism Records; Format: Digital download
Flannel EP	Released: 30 April 2020; Label: Smihilism Records; Format: Digital download

=== Singles ===
Title	Year	Peak chart positions			Album
Title	Year	UK	UK Indie	UK Break	Album
"Dota 2 Beta Key"	2011	—	—	—	Non-album single
"Knightmare/Frame"	2012	—	—	—	All the Lights in the Sky
"Minecraft Christmas (feat. Yogscast)"	2012	69	—	—	Non-album single
"Shi No Barado" (featuring Beckii Cruel)	2013	115	12	1	All the Lights in the Sky
"GO!! Fighting Action Power"	2013	—	—	12	Non-album single
"Heaven-Piercing Giga Drill"	2013	—	—	—	All the Lights in the Sky
"Homunculus"	2014	—	—	—	Non-album single
"Override [B]"	2015	—	—	—	Non-album single
"Versus"	2015	—	—	—	Modern Synthesis
"Watchmaker"	2016	—	—	—	Modern Synthesis
"The Contract"	2016	—	—	—	Modern Synthesis
"Processor"	2017	—	—	—	Modern Synthesis
"All Your Friends / New Magiks"	2018	—	—	—	Singlarity
"Everybody Gets a Piece"	2018	—	—	—	Singlarity
"Curtain Fall"	2018	—	—	—	Singlarity
"Tear Up"	2019	—	—	—	Singlarity
"ØCULIST"	2019	—	—	—	Singlarity
"Kaleidoscope"	2019	—	—	—	Singlarity
"Fortune Faded"	2019	—	—	—	Non-album single
"Desaturate"	2019	—	—	—	Singlarity
"4 Become 3" (Note: Released as Area 8.25)	2020	—	—	—	Non-album single
"(Break) In Case Of..."	2020	—	—	—	Singlarity
"Dancing on the Head of a Pin"	2020	—	—	—	Singlarity
"Singularity"	2020	—	—	—	Singlarity
"Plug in Baby"	2020	—	—	—	Non-album single
"Every You Every Me"	2020	—	—	—	Non-album single
"Floating World"	2020	—	—	—	Non-album single
"—" denotes a recording that did not chart or was not released in that territory.
