= Bunka Fashion College =

Vocational school in Tokyo, Japan

Coordinates: 35°41′7.2″N 139°41′40.2″E

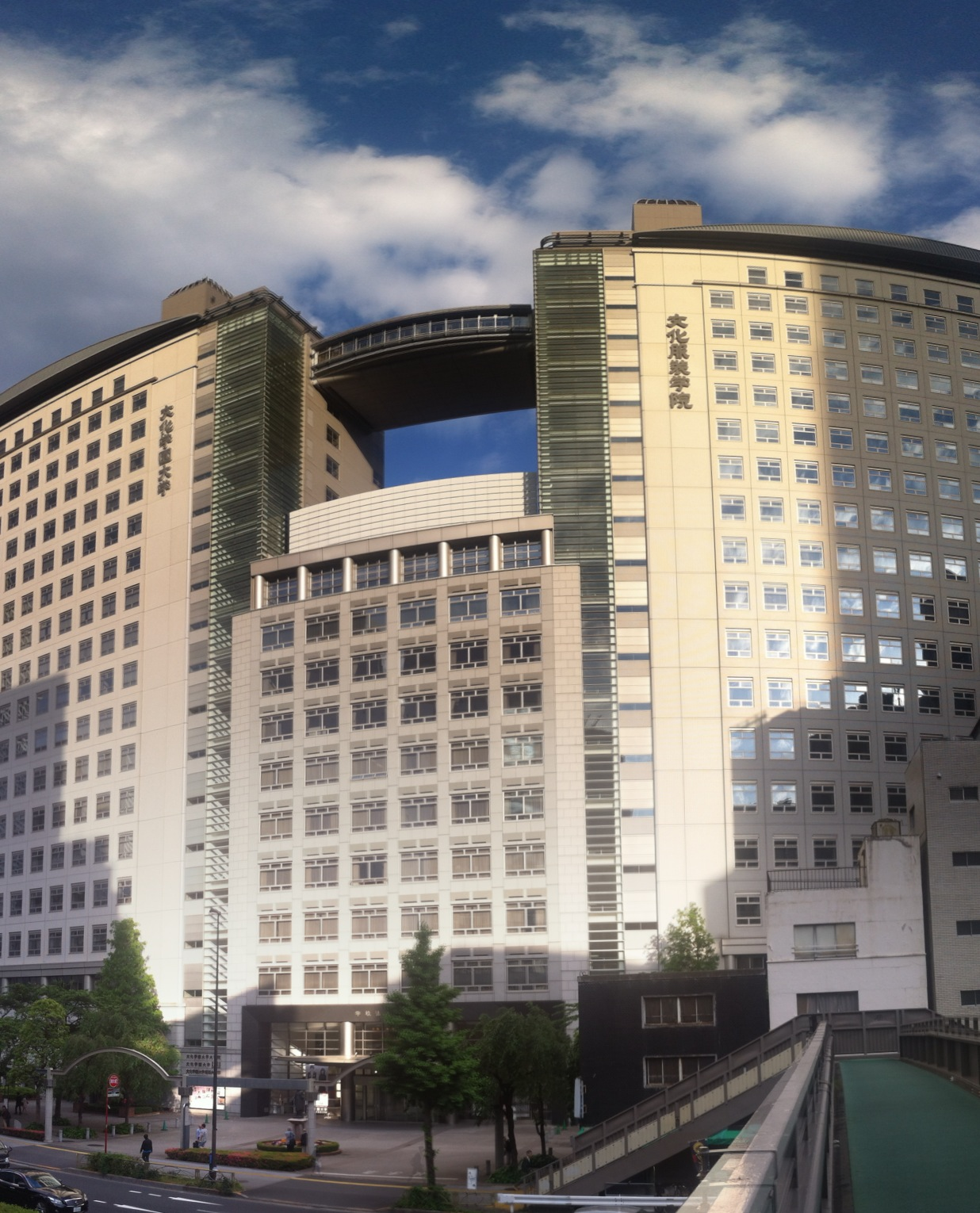
Main building of the Bunka Fashion College

Bunka Fashion College (文化服装学院, Bunka Fukusō Gakuin) is a Japanese vocational school specializing in fashion design and related disciplines. It is headquartered in Shinjuku, Tokyo, and has more than 70 branches throughout Japan.

== History ==
The college was founded in 1919 by Isaburō Namiki as a small dressmaking school for girls called Namiki Dressmaking School, at a time when European-style clothing for women was only available for affluent families. In 1936, the name of the school became Bunka Fashion College, and it began publishing So-en, Japan's first fashion magazine.

The Bunka Fashion College went through three major eras. First, it taught people and families how to make clothes. Then in the 1960s, designers from the school such as Kenzo Takada (who enrolled in 1958) and designer Yohji Yamamoto emerged in the international fashion scene and drove the rise of modern Japanese fashion. Since the 2000s, the school has aimed to develop a more global and sustainable fashion industry.

== Alumni ==
Alumni of the school include (fashion designers unless otherwise stated):

- Tsumori Chisato
- Misha Janette (blogger)
- H. Naoto
- Takeo Kikuchi
- Asami Kiyokawa (embroidery designer)
- Yoshiyuki Konishi
- Mariko Mori (artist)
- Nigo
- Naomi Nishida (actress)
- Peeco (fashion critic)
- Sebastiano Serafini (singer/songwriter)
- Tomoe Shinohara
- Kenzō Takada
- Jun Takahashi
- Junya Watanabe
- Yohji Yamamoto
- Hiromichi Ochiai
- Soshi Otsuki
- Shingo Sato

== Academics ==
Bunka has programs focusing on Fashion Design, Fashion Technology, Fashion Marketing and Distribution, Fashion Accessories and Textiles. In 2012, Bunka Gakuen University, the neighboring institute of higher education linked with the college, opened a Masters level course in Fashion Studies aimed at foreign students. This course is called the Global Fashion Concentration and is taught completely in English.

Every year, new mannequins are created that reflect the average measurements of the students of that year, in an effort to work on realistic physical figures. All students are required to study the human body shape and how human bodies move.

The Bunka school values the Satori and the Kaizen in its education. One Master program is held in English. Students must pass a Japanese language proficiency test, and part-time jobs are not allowed.

For oversea students who need to learn Japanese before enroll to the college. Bunka owns Bunka Institute of Language for them. It is in the same campus, and also belongs to the same group Bunka Gakuen.

== Main campus ==
Bunka has over 70 branches around Japan, but its main campus is in the western part of Tokyo's Shinjuku neighborhood. The main building is 21 stories tall, and includes facilities such as a library, costume museum, and a resource center. The main campus is about an 8-minute walk from JR Shinjuku Station and about a 3-minute walk from the #6 exit of the Toei Shinjuku subway station.

The campus is shared with 4 colleges and universities from Bunka Gakuen. The other 3 colleges is Bunka Fashion Graduate University, Bunka Gakuen University and Bunka Institute of Language.

== Awards ==
- #2 Best Fashion School of 2015 by Business of Fashion
- 2013: #7 in top 50 fashion schools in the world according to Fashionista
