= Tsubasa o Kudasai =

Japanese folk song by Michio Yamagami

Song by Akaitori (The Red Birds)

from the album Takeda no Komoriuta
- Language: Japanese
- A-side: "Takeda no Komoriuta (竹田の子守唄)"
- Written: 1970
- Released: February 5, 1971
- Genre: Folk rock
- Label: Liberty; Toshiba; Alfa
- Songwriter: Michio Yamagami
- Composer: Kunihiko Murai

Tsubasa o Kudasai (翼をください; lit. "Please Give Me Wings") is a popular Japanese folk song written by Michio Yamagami (山上路夫) and composed by Kunihiko Murai (村井邦彦), initially performed by the folk band Akaitori (The Red Birds).

== General ==
The song was composed for the Nemu Popular Festival '70 (合歓ポピュラーフェスティバル'70, nemu popyurâ fesutibaru '70) that took place in Shima, Mie Prefecture in 1970. The song appeared on the popular single record Takeda no Komoriuta released by the folk group Akaitori (赤い鳥) on February 5, 1971, becoming nationally known. In September 1973, Sumiko Yamagata released a reprise of the song in the album Ano hi no koto wa (あの日のことは).

Shoji Hashimoto, the editor of the publishing house Kyouiku Geijutsu-sha, decided to include the song in a choir textbook, causing it to be sung by choirs across Japan. By the second half of the 1970s, most people in Japan were familiar with the song.

Megumi Yokota once sang this song at a school competition.

The song was chosen as the official theme of the Japan national football team during the 1998 FIFA World Cup.

The song was used in the popular manga Goodnight Punpun.

The song was used to make the 2nd ending of Nichijō

A version of this song performed by Megumi Hayashibara is part of the soundtrack for the 2009 anime film Evangelion: 2.0 You Can (Not) Advance by Hideaki Anno.

== Covers ==
Many Japanese artists have released a cover version of this song:

- Babymetal
- D=Out
- Sayaka Ichii with Yūko Nakazawa
- Kazumasa Oda
- Kanon
- Houkago Tea Time
- Hideaki Tokunaga
- Megumi Hayashibara (present on the soundtrack of Evangelion: 2.0 You Can (Not) Advance)
- Ayaka Hirahara
- Saki Fukuda
- Masafumi Akikawa
- ManaKana
- Mucc
- Shūichi Murakami
- Saori Yuki
- Tanaka Yukio and Minami Maho (present on the soundtrack of BECK: Mongolian chop squad)
- Misato Watanabe
- Sakurakō Keion-bu (present on the soundtrack of K-ON!)
- Sayaka Sasaki (Second end credits of Nichijou)
- Misaki Iwasa
- Yui
- Megumi Toyoguchi (episode 7 of Danganronpa 3: The End of Hope's Peak High School Despair Arc)
- Mayumi Tanaka (as Krillin/Kuririn in Dragon Ball Z: Broly – The Legendary Super Saiyan)

This song has also been covered by several non-Japanese artists:

- Susan Boyle
- Jason Kouchak
- Hayley Westenra
- Kat McDowell
- Beckii Cruel
- Only Wednesday Music (Yandere Simulator Promo)
- CameronF305
