= All the Lights in the Sky =

Studio album by Area 11
- Released: 31 January 2013
- Recorded: August–December 2012
- Studio: Room4 Studios, (Bristol, United Kingdom)
- Genre: Alternative rock
- Length: 49:46
- Label: Smihilism Records
- Producer: Tom Clarke (Sparkles*)

Area 11 chronology
| Blackline (2011) | All the Lights in the Sky (2013) | Modern Synthesis (2016) |

First Issue

Singles from All the Lights in the Sky
- 1. "Shi No Barado (featuring Beckii Cruel)" Released: 27 April 2013; 2. "Heaven-Piercing Giga Drill" Released: 24 November 2013

All the Lights in the Sky is the debut album by the English rock band Area 11. Released on 31 January 2013, the album was originally available exclusively on digital format, however as the band grew they began to distribute limited edition physical copies of the album. All The Lights in the Sky was written and produced entirely by the band themselves and released independently. Despite the band's strictly independent status, the album was a success and spawned a number of sell-out tours across the UK. The album's name, as well as the track Heaven-Piercing Giga Drill, are a direct reference to the Japanese anime series Gurren Lagann.

== Recording ==
The band formed in 2010 in Nottingham, England. After releasing their debut EP Blackline the following year, they gained the attention of the popular YouTube broadcasting group The Yogscast, Tom Clarke (Sparkles*) and guitarist Alex Parvis, and were then contracted as audio/video producers by the group. Shortly after this the band began to record their debut album, and documented its progress in a three-part YouTube series.

The band released the album digitally on 31 January 2013. YouTube singing sensation Beckii Cruel appeared as a guest vocalist on the track "Shi No Barado", which was released as the first single from the album.

== Track listing ==
All tracks are written by Area 11 and Sparkles*, except where noted

| No. | Title | Writer(s) | Length |
|---|---|---|---|
| 1. | "System;Start" | | 1:05 |
| 2. | "Vectors" | | 3:41 |
| 3. | "Euphemia" | | 4:45 |
| 4. | "Knightmare/Frame" | | 3:25 |
| 5. | "Tokyo House Party" | | 4:22 |
| 6. | "Shi No Barado (feat. Beckii Cruel)" | | 5:18 |
| 7. | "Cassandra (pt II)" | | 3:23 |
| 8. | "The Strays" | Area 11; Jonathan Kogan | 4:28 |
| 9. | "Dream & Reality" | | 3:51 |
| 10. | "Heaven-Piercing Giga Drill" | | 4:17 |
| 11. | "Bōsōzoku Symphonic: 1: Ryōkan; 2: Senbazuru; 3: Redline; 4: All the Lights in the Sky; 5: Black Hole Giga Drill" | | 11:11: 3:30; 2:05; 1:43; 2:40; 1:13 |
| Total length: | | | 49:46 |

[COMPLETE] Edition disc 2
| No. | Title | Length |
|---|---|---|
| 1. | "System;Start (off-vocal)" | 1:05 |
| 2. | "Vectors (off-vocal)" | 3:41 |
| 3. | "Euphemia (off-vocal)" | 4:45 |
| 4. | "Knightmare/Frame (off-vocal)" | 3:25 |
| 5. | "Tokyo House Party (off-vocal)" | 4:22 |
| 6. | "Shi No Barado (feat. Beckii Cruel) (off-vocal)" | 5:18 |
| 7. | "Cassandra (pt II) (off-vocal)" | 3:23 |
| 8. | "The Strays (off-vocal)" | 4:28 |
| 9. | "Dream & Reality (off-vocal)" | 3:51 |
| 10. | "Heaven-Piercing Giga Drill (off-vocal)" | 4:17 |
| 11. | "All the Lights in the Sky (off-vocal)" | 4:32 |
| Total length: | | 43:07 |

[COMPLETE] Edition disc 3
| No. | Title | Length |
|---|---|---|
| 1. | "System;Start (commentary)" | 1:05 |
| 2. | "Vectors (commentary)" | 3:41 |
| 3. | "Euphemia (commentary)" | 4:45 |
| 4. | "Knightmare/Frame (commentary)" | 3:25 |
| 5. | "Tokyo House Party (commentary)" | 4:22 |
| 6. | "Shi No Barado (feat. Beckii Cruel) (commentary)" | 5:18 |
| 7. | "Cassandra (pt II) (commentary)" | 3:23 |
| 8. | "The Strays (commentary)" | 4:28 |
| 9. | "Dream & Reality (commentary)" | 3:51 |
| 10. | "Heaven-Piercing Giga Drill (commentary)" | 4:17 |
| 11. | "Bōsōzoku Symphonic (commentary): 1: Ryōkan; 2: Senbazuru; 3: Redline; 4: All the Lights in the Sky; 5: Black Hole Giga Drill" | 11:11: 3:30; 2:05; 1:43; 2:40; 1:13 |
| Total length: | | 49:46 |

[COMPLETE] Edition disc 4
| No. | Title | Length |
|---|---|---|
| 1. | "Black Hole Giga Drill (Extended)" | 2:04 |
| 2. | "The Legendary Sannin" | 5:10 |
| 3. | "Heaven-Piercing Giga Drill (Piano Version)" | 3:49 |
| 4. | "Knightmare/Frame" | 3:25 |
| 5. | "Tokyo House Party (Dirty Version)" | 4:23 |
| 6. | "Shi no Barado (feat. Beckii Cruel) (Japanese Version)" | 5:19 |
| 7. | "Cassandra (pt II) (Demo)" | 3:20 |
| 8. | "Stub Out The Stars (The Strays Demo)" | 4:34 |
| 9. | "Dream & Reality (Demo)" | 3:52 |
| 10. | "Heaven-Piercing Giga Drill (Single Version)" | 4:19 |
| 11. | "All The Lights in the Sky" | 4:32 |
| Total length: | | 45:44 |

Note: As a hidden track, the a reworked version of the 4th movement of Bōsōzoku Symphonic, "All the Lights in the Sky" is placed in the pregap of the first track on the CD release of the album. It can also be found on the digital disc 4 of the [COMPLETE] re-issue of the album. Additionally, an off-vocal version of this track appears on the second disc of [COMPLETE] re-issue in place of Bōsōzoku Symphonic.

== Personnel ==
=== Area 11 ===
- Sparkles* – vocals; guitar; keytar; synthesizer
- Alex Parvis – guitar; vocals
- Jonathan Kogan – bass guitar; vocals; saxophone
- Leo Taylor – percussion; vocals

=== Additional musicians ===
- Beckii Cruel – dialogue on "System;Start, vocals on "Shi no Barado"
- Luke Owens – guitar on "Euphemia"
- Martyn Littlewood – dialogue on "System;Start"
- Kaeyi Dream – dialogue on "System;Start"
- Sam Thorne – dialogue on "System;Start"

=== Production ===
- Sparkles* & Area 11 – engineering
- Phil Davies – additional engineering
- Sparkles* & Phil Davies – mixing
- Peter Van 'T Riet – mastering

=== Design ===
- Adam Davis – artwork
- Sparkles* – sleeve and booklet design

== Additional releases ==
A re-release of the album, called "All The Lights in the Sky [COMPLETE]" was available for pre-order on 19 December 2013 and released on 13 January 2014. While the purchase contained an original copy of the physical disc, the digital download consisted of 4 11-tracks discs. Discs 2 and 3 were off-vocal and commentary versions of the original album tracks, respectively, while disc 4 contained demos, extended/updated songs, and "The Legendary Sannin," a song from their previous release, Blackline and the B-side to the single "Shi No Barado."

== Commercial performance ==
Considering the band's size, the album was a commercial success, charting at number 75 on the UK Albums Chart and selling over 12,000 copies worldwide.
