= Soen (magazine) =

Japanese monthly women's fashion magazine

- Categories: Women's fashion magazine
- Frequency: Monthly
- Publisher: Bunka Publishing Bureau
- Founder: Bunka Fashion College
- Founded: 1936
- Country: Japan
- Based in: Tokyo
- Language: Japanese
- Website: Soen

Soen (装苑, Sōen) is a Japanese monthly women's magazine with a special focus on fashion. The magazine is based in Tokyo, Japan. Founded in 1936, it is the first fashion magazine in the country. It is also the oldest Japanese fashion magazine still in publication.

== History and profile ==
Soen was established by Bunka Fukusō Gakuin (meaning Bunka Fashion College in English) in 1936. The magazine is published by Bunka Publishing Bureau on a monthly basis. It has a sister publication, High Fashion. Soen targets women.

In the 1950s Soen featured articles on Paris fashion week. In addition, the magazine also covered new look style of Dior between 1948 and 1950. It awards the Soen Prize, which was formed in 1956. Some of the Japanese fashion designers won the prize include Junko Koshino, Yohji Yamamoto, Kenzo Takada, Kansai Yamamoto, Tokio Kumagai, Kensho Abe, and Yusuke Takahashi.
