= Peeco =

Japanese television personality, fashion critic, journalist, and singer

- ピーコ
- Born: Katsuaki Sugiura (杉浦 克昭); 18 January 1945; Hodogaya-ku, Yokohama, Kanagawa Prefecture, Japan
- Died: 3 September 2024 (aged 79); Kanagawa Prefecture, Japan
- Education: Yokohama Municipal Sakuragaoka High School; Bunka Fashion College
- Occupations: Tarento, fashion critic
- Years active: 1975–2021

Peeco (ピーコ, Pīko; born Katsuaki Sugiura (杉浦 克昭, Sugiura Katsuaki), 18 January 1945 - 3 September 2024) was a Japanese tarento, fashion critic, journalist, and chanson singer. His younger identical twin brother is film critic Osugi, they both came out gay during their debut and took his advantage as a tarento and commentator.

On 20 October 2024, it was announced that Peeco had died on 3 September of that year due to sepsis as a result of multiple organ failure.

== Filmography ==
=== Current appearances ===
==== TV series ====
| Title | Network | Notes |
|---|---|---|
| Osu Pee no Shinebara! | Channel Neco | |
| Kyō Doki | HBC | |
| Peeco & Hyōdō no Pīchike Pāchike | KTV | |
| BS Fuji Platinum Sunday | BS Fuji | Host |

=== Irregular appearances ===
==== TV series ====
| Title | Network |
|---|---|
| Wide Show Joshikai | TBS |
| Chichin Puipui | MBS |
| Asadesu. | KBC |

=== Former appearances ===
==== TV series ====
| Year | Title | Network | Notes |
|---|---|---|---|
| | Ohayō! Nice Day | Fuji TV | |
| | Time 3 | Fuji TV | |
| | Time Angle | Fuji TV | |
| | 3-ji ni Aimashou | TBS | |
| | Big Today | Fuji TV | |
| | 2-ji no Honto | Fuji TV | |
| | Takajin One Man | MBS | |
| | Just | TBS | |
| | F2 Smile | Fuji TV | |
| | 100% Kyaeen! | Fuji TV | |
| | Monomane Ōzakettei-sen | Fuji TV | As part of Osugi to Peeco |
| | Cchūnen! | MBS | |
| | OsuPee & LonBoo no Oki nasai yo! | Fuji TV | |
| | Tsūkai! Everyday | KTV | Tuesday appearances |
| | Rankin no Paradise | MBS | Friday appearances |
| | Noriyuki no Talk De Hokkaido | UHB | |
| | FNS Super News Anchor | KTV | Monday appearances |
| 2000 | Waratte Iitomo! | Fuji TV | Wednesday appearances; co-starring with Osugi |
| 2009 | Hikari Ota's If I Were Prime Minister... Secretary Tanaka | NTV | |
| | Waratte Iitomo Special Issue | Fuji TV | Sunday appearances |
| | Tokudane! | Fuji TV | |

==== Radio ====
| Year | Title | Network | Notes |
|---|---|---|---|
| | Yuichi Uwaizumi no Hasshin! Uwa Rajio | MBS Radio | Monthly Tuesday appearances |
| | Rokusuke Ei no Doyō Wide | TBS Radio | Monthly Saturday appearances |
| 2010 | Masahiko Ueyanagi: Gogoban! | NBS | |

==== Advertisements ====
| Title | Notes |
|---|---|
| Kōkyō Kōkoku Kikō | |
| Aderans | |
| The Eye | Only appeared in a parody of the film advert |
| Otsuka Beverage Match | |
| Ishida | |

== Bibliography ==
=== Solo ===
Title
Katame o Ushinatte Miete kita mono
Peeco Goroku

=== Co-author ===
| Year | Title | Notes |
|---|---|---|
| | Peeco Den | Interviewed by Shigesato Itoi |
| | Peeco to Sawako | Interviewed by Sawako Agawa |
| 2005 | Kenpō o Kaete Sensō ni Ikou: To iu Yononaka ni Shinai Tame no 18-ri no Hatsugen | Co-authored with Kazuyuki Izutsu, Hisashi Inoue, Rika Kayama, Kang Sang-jung, Yuichi Kimura, Tetsuko Kuroyanagi, Kaname Saruya, Masaji Shinagawa, Nameko Shinsan, Seizo Tashima, Tetsu Nakamura, Kazutoshi Hando, Yuko Matsumoto, Akihiro Miwa, Takuro Morinaga, Sayuri Yoshinaga, and Eriko Watanabe |

== Discography ==
=== LP records ===
| Year | Title | Notes |
|---|---|---|
| 1979 | The Party | As part of Osugi to Peeco |

=== Singles ===
| Year | Title |
|---|---|
| 2004 | "Ai-biki" |

=== Albums ===
| Year | Title |
|---|---|
| 2004 | Koi wa Tsuitachi no yō ni Peeco: Chanson o Utau |
