= Soshi Otsuki =

Japanese fashion designer (born 1990)

- 大月 壮士
- Born: 1990 (age 35–36); Chiba Prefecture, Japan
- Education: Bunka Fashion College
- Occupation: Fashion designer
- Years active: 2015–present
- Awards: LVMH Prize (2025)

Soshi Otsuki is a Japanese fashion designer based in Tokyo. He launched the menswear label SOSHIOTSUKI in 2015, and in September 2025 he won the LVMH Prize for Young Fashion Designers.

A graduate of Bunka Fashion College, he has won the LVMH Prize. Soshi Otsuki has collaborated with ASICS and PROLETA RE ART.

Brand development platform Tomorrow partners with Soshi Otsuki starting with the Fall/Winter 2025 season, overseeing its wholesale operations and expanding its international distribution.

== Early life and education ==
Otsuki was born in 1990 in Chiba Prefecture, the prefecture immediately east of Tokyo. His father worked in construction and his mother was a homemaker, but clothing ran through the wider family: both of his grandmothers and an uncle worked in dressmaking, knitting and design, and his mother sewed garments for him as a child. He has said that his interest in tailoring began in high school, when he started wearing a lapelled jacket as everyday clothing.

He took the menswear course at Bunka Fashion College in Tokyo and, while enrolled there, also attended the independent fashion school Coconogacco.

== Career ==
=== Label and early recognition ===
Otsuki launched SOSHIOTSUKI in 2015 and was short-listed for the 2016 LVMH Prize with only two collections behind him. He won the Tokyo New Designer Fashion Grand Prix in the professional category in 2019, and the Tokyo Fashion Award in 2024, which funded a presentation of his work at a Paris showroom. The label was incorporated as SOSHIOTSUKI Co., Ltd. in 2021.

=== 2025 LVMH Prize ===
In September 2025, Otsuki was named winner of the LVMH Prize for Young Fashion Designers at a ceremony at the Fondation Louis Vuitton in Paris, where the award was handed to him by the actress Deepika Padukone. The prize carries an endowment of €400,000 and a year of mentoring by LVMH executives. He was one of eight finalists in the twelfth edition of the competition, which drew more than 2,300 applicants. He was the third Japanese designer to receive it, almost a decade after his first short-listing. Otsuki said he intended to spend the money on the label's infrastructure, with the aim of eventually staging two runway shows a year.

=== Pitti Uomo and Paris debut ===
Otsuki was invited as guest designer of the 109th edition of Pitti Immagine Uomo, held in Florence from January 13 to 16, 2026, and also designed the outfit used in the fair's campaign for that edition. He presented his fall/winter 2026–27 collection on January 15 at the Refettorio di Santa Maria Novella, in what was his first runway show in Europe. It was also his first catwalk show of any kind; until then he had presented his collections through lookbooks.

In May 2026 the Fédération de la Haute Couture et de la Mode placed the label on the provisional calendar for the Paris spring 2027 menswear season, with a show scheduled for June 27. At his Paris Fashion Week debut he stripped the linings from his soft-shouldered jackets and paired them with pleated trousers, knee-length shorts and striped pajama sets, taking as his starting point a teenage memory of imagining a classmate's holiday in Hawaii.

=== Zara collaboration ===
In December 2025 the label released a capsule collection with the Spanish retailer Zara titled "A Sense of Togetherness", covering womenswear, menswear and childrenswear and drawing on Japanese cultural references of the 1980s and 1990s; it went on sale on December 4 online and in selected stores. Otsuki said the childrenswear was shaped by memories of clothes his mother had made for him.

== Design ==
Otsuki's collections rework the relationship between Japanese dress and Western tailoring. A recurring reference is the suit worn by Japanese office workers during the bubble economy of the 1980s, when Italian houses such as Giorgio Armani shaped menswear in Japan; Otsuki has said he is drawn to salaryman dress because a suit is accepted without question as a social garment. Details taken from traditional Japanese clothing, such as pockets that echo kimono sleeves, are built into otherwise Western garments, and he has described his design philosophy as rooted in an interest in Japanese classical performing arts including kabuki and rakugo.
