= Bunka Institute of Language =

Language school in Tokyo, Japan

Bunka Institute of Language is a language school for Japanese learning, located in Tokyo, Japan. It also offers courses for Japanese teaching and translation. The school is founded in 1980, and it is a part of Bunka Gakuen, which holds the fashion school Bunka Fashion College.

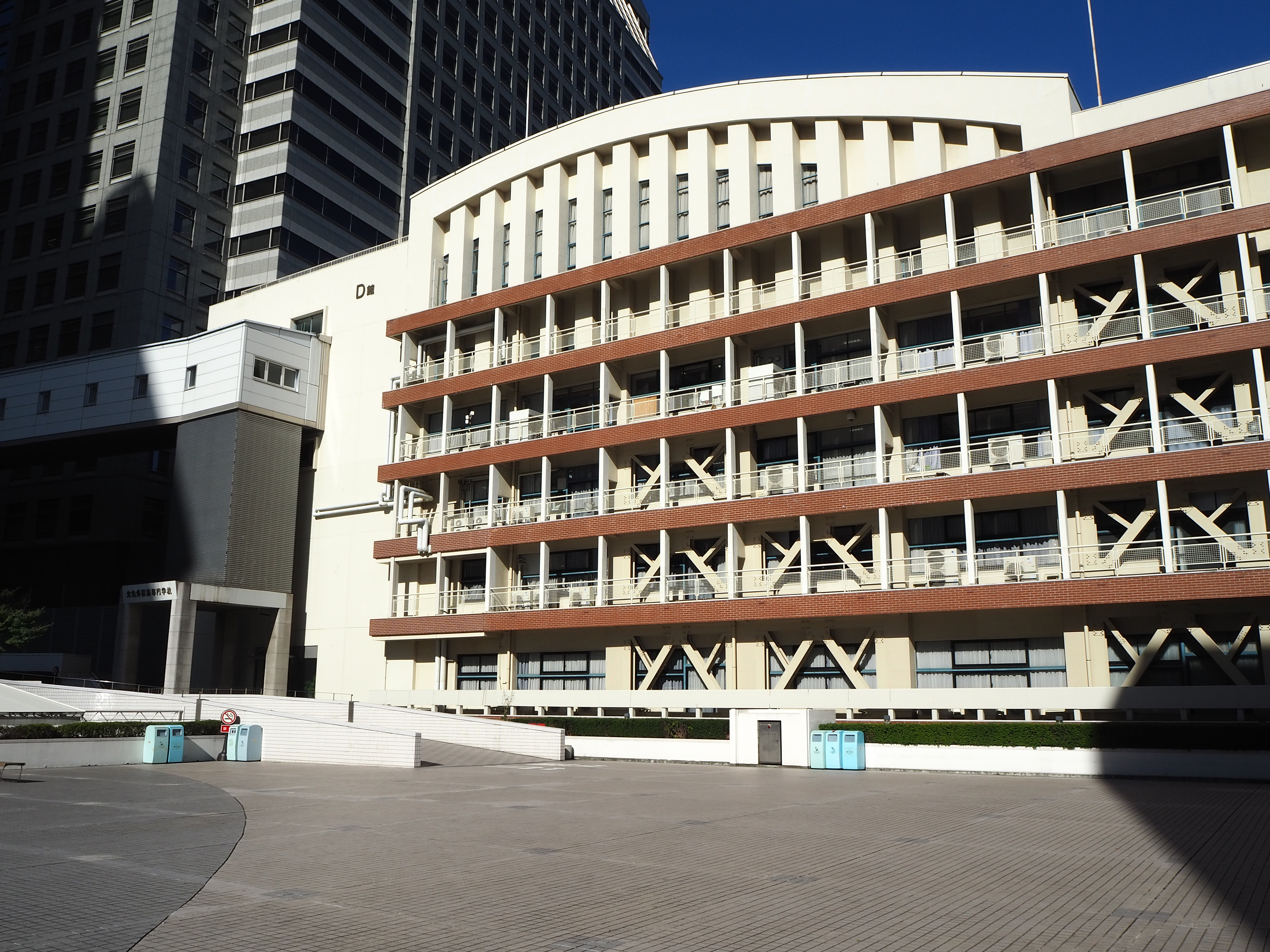
