= Modern Synthesis =

Studio album by Area 11
- Released: 1 July 2016
- Recorded: April 2015 – January 2016
- Studio: Room4 Studios, (Bristol, United Kingdom)
- Genre: Post-hardcore; heavy metal; alternative rock
- Length: 52:30
- Label: Cooking Vinyl, Smihilism Records
- Producer: Tom Clarke (Sparkles*)

Area 11 chronology
All the Lights in the Sky (2013)	Modern Synthesis (2016)	Let It Resonate (2016)

Alternate Artwork

Singles from Modern Synthesis
- 1. "Versus" Released: 13 November 2015; 2. "Watchmaker" Released: 6 May 2016; 3. "The Contract" Released: 13 June 2016; 4. "Processor" Released: 2 June 2017

Modern Synthesis is the second studio album by English rock band Area 11. It was released on 1 July 2016 and has an 11-song track list similar to their previous album All The Lights In The Sky. The album was written and partially recorded in Italy from between in the Spring of 2016 and then recorded in England throughout the rest of the year of 2015 into early 2016 between the band's tours.

The writing process for this album was more collaborative than the band's other records, with Jonathan Kogan and Sparkles* sharing much of the work, and with band members Alex Parvis and Leo Taylor contributing. This album is the band's first to be partly distributed by a non-indie label: Cooking Vinyl.

== Track list ==
No.	Title	Writer(s)	Length
0.	"Override [B]"	Sparkles*	6:04
1.	"Override [C]"	Sparkles*; Jonathan Kogan	4:32
2.	"The Contract"	Sparkles*; Jonathan Kogan	3:58
3.	"Watchmaker"	Sparkles*; Jonathan Kogan	4:09
4.	"Versus"	Sparkles*	4:13
5.	"Processor"	Sparkles*; Jonathan Kogan	6:51
6.	"Red Queen"	Jonathan Kogan; Area 11	4:53
7.	"Angel Lust"	Sparkles*	5:07
8.	"The Life of a Ghost"	Leo Taylor; Sparkles*; Jonathan Kogan	4:02
9.	"After the Flags"	Sparkles*; Jonathan Kogan	3:36
10.	"Nebula"	Sparkles*; Jonathan Kogan	4:12
11.	"Panacea and the Prelogue"	Sparkles*; Jonathan Kogan; Leo Taylor	6:57
Total length:			58:34

Note: As a hidden track, the previously released single, "Override [B]" is placed in the pregap of the first track Override [C]. This track is exclusive to the CD release of the album.

== Personnel ==
=== Area 11 ===
- Sparkles* – vocals; guitar; piano; synthesizer
- Alex Parvis – guitar; guitar; vocals
- Jonathan Kogan – bass guitar; vocals; guitar
- Leo Taylor – percussion; guitar; vocals

=== Additional musicians ===
- Connie McGuinness Griffiths – vocals on "Panacea and the Prelogue"
- Megan Paschke – vocals on "Panacea and the Prelogue"
- Owen Piper – vocals on "Panacea and the Prelogue"

=== Production ===
- Sparkles* and Leo Taylor – engineering
- Phil Davies – additional engineering
- Sparkles* and Phil Davies – mixing
- Tom Woodhead – mastering

=== Design ===
- Daniel Houlb and Adam Davis – artwork
- Sparkles* – sleeve and booklet design; photography

== Charts ==
Chart (2016)	Peak position
UK Albums (OCC)	27
