= Kawaii International =

Television series

Kawaii International was a television series that aired on NHK World from 2012 to 2021. The program focused on the global phenomenon of "kawaii" culture. It explored the various subcultures of kawaii, makeup techniques, DIY crafts, and food trends. Over the years, the show had a number of hosts including RinRin Doll and Misha Janette.
