= Yoshiyuki Konishi =

Japanese fashion designer (born 1950)

- 小西 良幸
- Born: Masanori Konishi; October 9, 1950 (age 75); Tsu, Mie Prefecture, Japan
- Other name: Don Konishi
- Occupation: Fashion designer
- Agent: Someday

Masanori Konishi (小西 正紀, Konishi Masanori) (born October 9, 1950), better known as Yoshiyuki Konishi (小西 良幸, Konishi Yoshiyuki) is a Japanese fashion designer who is represented by the talent agency Someday. He is nicknamed Don Konishi (ドン 小西). He was divorced and is now single.

== Filmography ==
=== TV series ===
Title	Role	Network	Notes
Kindaichi Shōnen no Jikenbo	Mitsuhiko Mujo	NTV	
I Stage		TV Aichi	
Oto Kakumei II		TV Aichi	
Sukkiri!!		NTV	

=== Radio series ===
Title	Network	Notes
Noriaki Kano Otoko no Yaritai-hōdai!	Radio Nippon	

=== Advertisements ===
Title	Notes
Earth Chemical "Bōchūzai Pireparaasu"	

=== Newspapers ===
Title	Newspaper	Notes
"Don Konishi no Don Torai"	Ise Shinbun	

=== Magazines ===
Title	Notes
Navi	Nigensha

=== Weekly magazines ===
Title	Notes
Shūkan Asahi "Don Konishi no Iketeru Fashion Check"	
