= Yohji Yamamoto =

Japanese fashion designer

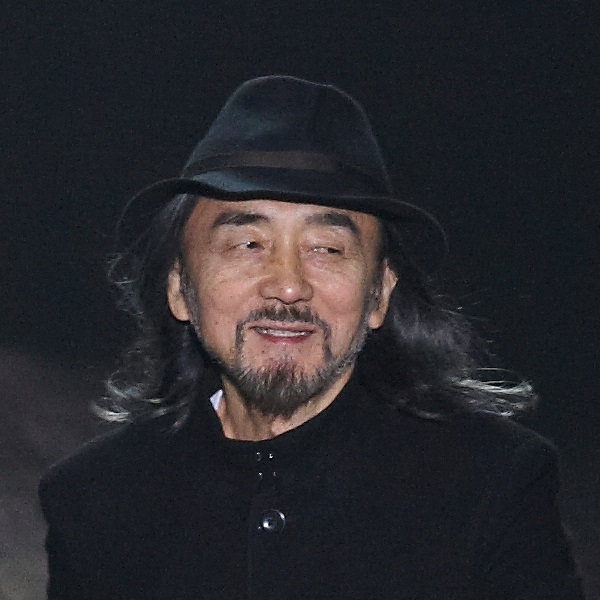
- Yamamoto, February 2010
- Born: 3 October 1943 (age 83); Tokyo, Empire of Japan
- Education: Keio University; Bunka Fashion College
- Occupation: Fashion designer
- Labels: Yohji Yamamoto; Yohji Yamamoto Pour Homme; Y's; Y-3

Yohji Yamamoto: A Kind of Woman by Matthew Donaldson, from Nowness

Yohji Yamamoto (山本 耀司, Yamamoto Yōji; born 3 October 1943) is a Japanese fashion designer based in Tokyo and Paris. He is considered a master tailor, alongside those such as Madeleine Vionnet, and is best known for his avant-garde tailoring featuring Japanese design aesthetics.

Yamamoto has won notable awards for his contributions to fashion, including the Chevalier/Officier/Commandeur of Ordre des Arts et des Lettres, Medal of Honor with Purple Ribbon, the Ordre national du Mérite, the Royal Designer for Industry and the Master of Design award by Fashion Group International.

== Early life and education ==
Yohji Yamamoto was born on 3 October 1943 in Tokyo as the eldest son of his father, Fumio Yamamoto, who ran a company that sold prepared foods to department stores in Kabukicho, and his mother, Fumi Yamamoto, who helped with accounting and administrative work. After his father was killed in the Battle of Luzon in the Philippines during the Asia-Pacific War in World War II when Yohji was two, his mother Fumi, who ran a custom-made clothing store (Fumi Clothing Store) in Kabukicho. (His maternal grandmother was also a graduate of Bunka Fashion College).

In 1966, at age 23, Yamamoto graduated from Keio University with a degree in law. He gave up a prospective legal career to assist his mother in her dressmaking business, from where he learned his tailoring skills. He further studied fashion design at Bunka Fashion College, earning his degree in 1969.

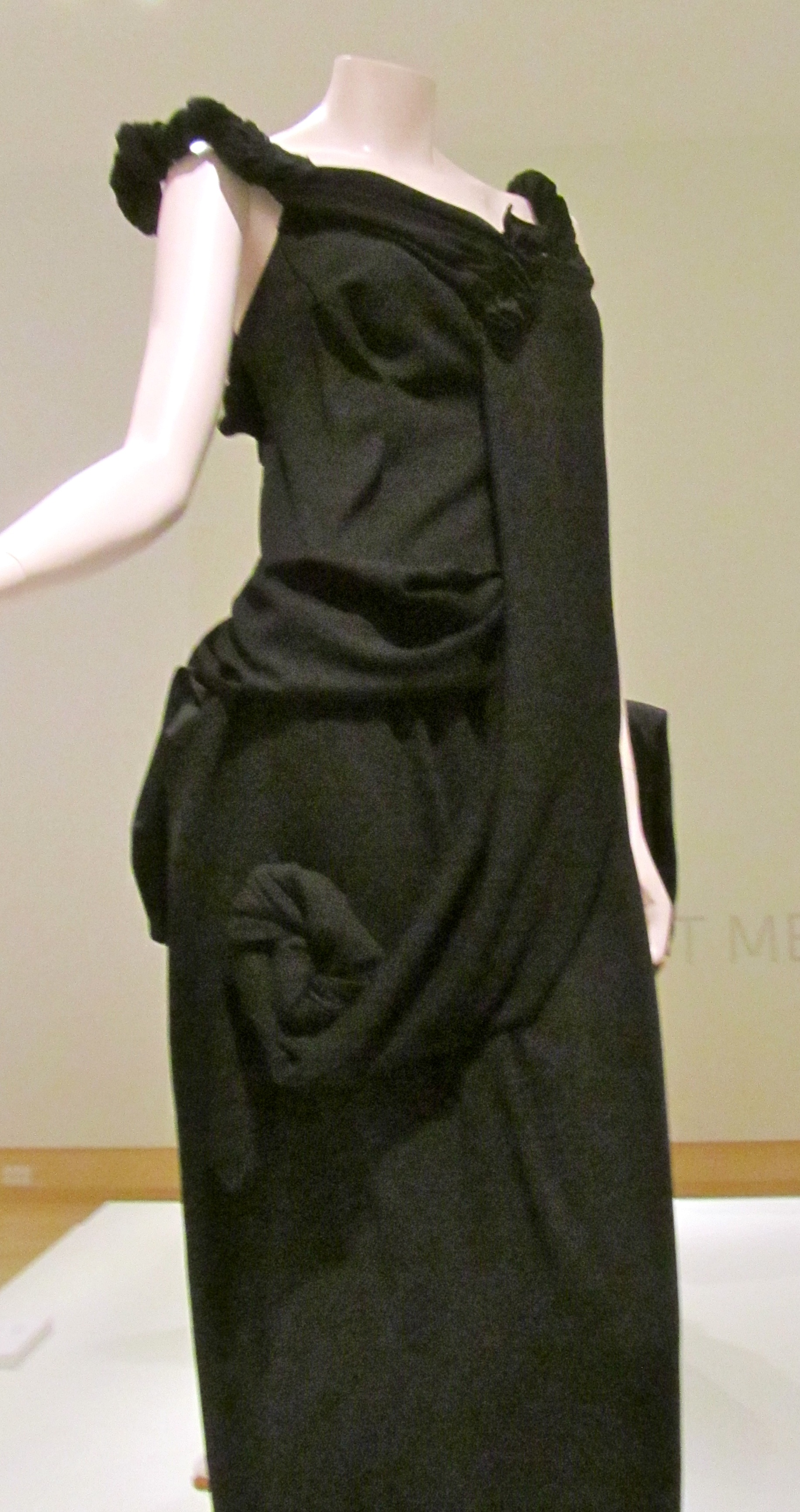
Yohji Yamamoto designed gown, 1998

== Career ==
Yamamoto had his first show in Tokyo in 1977, followed by shows in Paris (1981) and New York (1982). His first collection, under the label Y's, focused on womenswear which reflected typical men's garments, with clothes cut in uncluttered shapes with washed fabrics and dark colors. In an interview with The New York Times in 1983, Yamamoto said of his designs, "I think that my men's clothes look as good on women as my women's clothing […] When I started designing, I wanted to make men's clothes for women." More recently he has expounded: "When I started making clothes for my line Y's in 1977, all I wanted was for women to wear men's clothes. I jumped on the idea of designing coats for women. It meant something to me – the idea of a coat guarding and hiding a woman's body. I wanted to protect the woman's body from something – maybe from men's eyes or a cold wind."

His main lines, Yohji Yamamoto (women's), Yohji Yamamoto Pour Homme (men's), and Y's, are especially regarded worldwide with runway presentations at each seasonal Paris fashion week. These main lines are also available at his flagship stores in Paris, London, and New York and at high-end department stores. Other principal lines include REGULATION, Costume d'Homme, and discord, among many other diffusion lines for clothes, jewellery, and accessories.

Yamamoto is known for an avant-garde spirit in his pieces, frequently creating designs far removed from current trends. His signature oversized silhouettes often feature drapery in varying textures. Yohji's collections are predominately made in black, a colour which Yamamoto has described as "modest and arrogant at the same time. Black is lazy and easy – but mysterious. But above all black says this: "I don't bother you – don't bother me"."

Poor decisions by finance managers pushed the brand into debts of more than US$65 million in 2009, which angered Yamamoto and led to a company restructuring from 2009 to 2010. The private equity firm Integral Corp was identified as the Japanese company who will restructure the Yohji Yamamoto brand and by November 2010 the company was out of debt.

Since its Paris debut in 1981, the Yohji Yamamoto brand has continued to expand its influence through fashion. In recent times, it has adapted to changing market demands with a leap into the wider creative field with the introduction of a new project titled WILDSIDE.

== Fashion advocacy ==
In 2008, the Yohji Yamamoto Fund for Peace was established to foster development of China's fashion industry and to help heal the long-standing enmity between China and Japan. Each year, an emerging Chinese designer will be awarded with a two-year scholarship to a fashion college in Japan or Europe, and a male or female Chinese fashion model will be selected to make a runway debut during the Paris prêt-à-porter season.

Yamamoto has been quoted as saying: "they must have so many angry young people. Being a fashion designer or an artist, you have to be angry." Of the fashion show he staged in Beijing in spring 2008 to launch this initiative, Yamamoto said, "It's not political. I am going to open a store here, then Chinese people will come and shop there, and then they are happy. The real art is making people happy, but also asking questions about society."

== Brand identity ==
Yamamoto's designs recall Japanese drawing techniques.

His technique consists of wide cuts, often oversized, exotic and luxurious materials and elaborate handicrafts. The designer endeavors to make his pieces from the back and not from the front. He favors dark colors.

== Chronology ==
- 1973: Founded Y's joint stock corporation
- 1977: Tokyo collection debut
- 1981: Pret a porter collection debut in Paris. Yohji Yamamoto line started at the same time
- 1984: Yohji Yamamoto joint stock corporation founded
- 1993: Designed costumes for the Heiner Müller & Daniel Barenboim production of Richard Wagner's opera Tristan und Isolde at The Bayreuth Festival
- 1996: Designed alongside Red or Dead founders Wayne and Gerardine Hemingway MBE
- 1999: Digital actress Laura modelled clothes design by him for High Fashion magazine
- 2002: Haute couture collection presented in Paris. Relationship formed with exclusive Parisian boutiques
- 2003: Opening of the Y's line flagship store in Roppongi Hills
- 2003: Y-3 line and collection debut
- 2011: Exhibition at the Victoria and Albert Museum in London
- 2014: Designs third kits for the football club Real Madrid
- 2019: Designs the All Blacks jerseys for the 2019 Rugby World Cup
- 2022: Designed a special alternate all-black uniform set for the Yomiuri Giants that was played from September 6–8 against the Yokohama DeNA BayStars

== Awards ==
- France: Ordre des Arts et des Lettres / Chevalier, 1994
- Japan: Medals of Honor / Medal with Purple Ribbon, 2004
- Japan: Japan brand development (contributed corporation) award from METI, 2005
- France: Ordre des Arts et des Lettres / Officier, 2005
- France: Ordre des Arts et des Lettres / Commandeur, 2011
- United Kingdom: Outstanding Achievement Award at The Fashion Awards, 2026 (announced recipient)

== Filmography ==
- Notebook on Cities and Clothes (1989) by Wim Wenders
- Brother (2000) by Kitano Takeshi
- Dolls (2002) by Kitano Takeshi
- Wagner: Tristan und Isolde (2008) by Heiner Müller
- Yohji Yamamoto: This is My Dream (2011) by Theo Stanley
- Yohji Yamamoto: Dressmaker (2016) by NGO The Chau

== See also ==
- Deconstruction (fashion)
- 1980s in fashion
- 1990s in fashion
