= Shattered Angels =

Japanese manga and anime television series

- Kyoshiro to Towa no Sora manga volume 1.

京四郎と永遠の空 (Kyōshirō to Towa no Sora)
- Genre: Fantasy, mecha, romance
- Manga
- Written by: Kaishaku
- Published by: Fujimi Shobo
- Magazine: Monthly Dragon Age
- Original run: May 2006 – July 2007
- Volumes: 3
- Anime television series
- Directed by: Tetsuya Yanagisawa
- Produced by: Kouhei Kawase; Yoshikazu Beniya; Tsuneo Takechi; Ryousuke Naya; Shinobu Nakagawa
- Written by: Sumio Uetake
- Music by: Mina Kubota
- Studio: TNK
- Licensed by: NA: Funimation
- Original network: Chiba TV, TV Saitama
- Original run: January 5, 2007 – March 23, 2007
- Episodes: 12
- Light novel
- Written by: Sumio Uetake
- Illustrated by: Kaishaku
- Published by: Fujimi Shobo
- Imprint: Fujimi Fantasia Bunko
- Published: February 20, 2007

Shattered Angels (京四郎と永遠の空, Kyōshirō to Towa no Sora; lit. 'Kyoshiro and the Eternal Sky') is a Japanese manga created by Kaishaku which was first serialized in the Japanese shōnen manga magazine Monthly Dragon Age in May 2006. A 12-episode anime, adapted from the manga, aired in Japan from January 5 to March 23, 2007. The series refers to several of Kaishaku's past works: Kannazuki no Miko, Magical Nyan Nyan Taruto, UFO Ultramaiden Valkyrie and Steel Angel Kurumi.

== Plot ==
Shattered Angels revolves around Kū Shiratori, an apparently-normal high-school girl, who enjoys school life in the large city of Academia. Academia is one of the signs of recovery for humanity ten years after the greatest disaster humankind had ever seen. Kū has a recurring dream in which a prince meets her and takes her away. One day, while her schoolmates are preparing for the upcoming school festival, the prince from her dreams appears. Named Kyoshiro Ayanokoji, his request is the same as in Kū's dreams: "Let's go, together".

Most of the main characters are involved in romantic relationships, and Kū is uncertain of who is in love with whom. The Absolute Angels are superhuman, and to remain so they must draw energy from humans through their lips. The Angels materialize, controlling their mecha from without and using large, mechanized limbs. During a battle, the angels phase into and out of their angelic forms. As in Kannazuki no Miko, the names of the mecha are drawn from artifacts and figures of Japanese and European mythology.

== Characters ==
Kū Shiratori (白鳥 空, Shiratori Kū)
Voiced by: Sayuri Yahagi (Japanese); Brittney Karbowski (English)
Kū is a high school girl who feels as though she is drifting through existence and describes herself as "empty". She gives letters to a mysterious prince in her dreams, and talks to him in her thoughts. An introverted girl, she thinks she lacks good qualities and seems easily overwhelmed by situations which differ from her previous experiences and expectations. Her original name is Cielo (チェーロ, Chēro) (sky), and she is the original Absolute Angel researched by Kazuya and his grandfather. During the incident ten years before the main story, Cielo is split into four entities: Murakumo, Batraz, Claíomh Solais and Megingjord; Megingjord is also divided in two. Kū is the original body; Valteishia is her soul, which is why Kū feels that she lacks something inside. At the end of the series, her body crumbles and she is reincarnated as a younger version of herself. Before the end of the last episode, she dreams of the four Absolute Angels. After the credits of the last episode, Kyoshiro and Setsuna find her near the European Alps; when she sees Kyoshiro, she remembers her past life. Her personality and characteristics resemble Himeko Kurusugawa in Kannazuki no Miko.
Kyoshiro Ayanokoji (綾小路 京四郎, Ayanokoji Kyōshirō)
Voiced by: Katsuyuki Konishi (Japanese); Josh Grelle (English)
Kyoshiro is identified by Kū as the prince of her dreams when he transfers to her school from Jōtō Academy. Refined and a good equestrian, he plays the violin when deep in thought. The youngest of four children, Kyoshiro supports the Central Student Government and intends to destroy the Absolute Angels in accordance with what he believes were the wishes of his late brother Kazuya. After he falls in love with Kū, he re-evaluates his beliefs about the Absolute Angels and the way he has been treating Setsuna. He admits to her that he loves Kū. Setsuna eventually understands and agrees to his plans after she goes with him to find Ku and say goodbye.
Setsuna (せつな)
Voiced by: Yuki Matsuoka (Japanese); Maggie Flecknoe (English)
Setsuna (also known as "Setsuna of the Moment of Dreams") is the Absolute Angel Claíomh Solais and fights alongside Kyoshiro. She treasures a ribbon bow with bells, given to her by Kyoshiro and tied to the right side of her headdress. Rarely expressing emotion, she is beautiful and an excellent homemaker, causing Kū to call her a "princess". Setsuna acts only according to Kyoshiro's wishes, habitually asking "Would you prefer that, Kyoshiro?". Jealous of Kyoshiro and Kū's relationship, she represses her feelings to not trouble him. When Kyoshiro admits his love for Kū, however, Setsuna expresses her feelings for the first time. In special three of the anime, Setsuna began copying Kū's actions to please Kyoshiro. Later understanding Ku's feelings, she lets Kyoshiro love her. After cutting her hair, Setsuna accompanies Kyoshiro to find Kū and say goodbye. Her Absolute Angel symbol is on her right arm, the dominant arm of Claíomh Solais.
Mika Ayanokoji (綾小路 三華, Ayanokoji Mika)
Voiced by: Atsuko Tanaka (Japanese); Kaytha Coker (English)
Mika is the head of the Higashigetsu Fūma Witch Academy, dominating the female students with her aide Kaon. She is jealous and possessive when she sees Himiko providing Kaon with energy, and punishes subordinates who fail her. The third-oldest child in the Ayanokoji family, her right eye is purple and her left orange. Mika was hospitalized with an injury during the "Seven Days of Hot Snow", and she is shown with a bandage on her left eye. She wants Murakamo to love no one but herself and is jealously contemptuous of Himiko, who is much higher in Kaon's affections than she is. Mika's flashbacks to her hospitalization indicate that Kaon reminds her of a nurse who had cared for her. Others she mistreats are her older brother Kazuya (whom she hates because of the events surrounding his "death") and her younger brother Kyoshiro; she considers him "the demon's tail" and Kazuya "the demon". Mika's hatred of Kazuya originated during her early teens, when he deliberately stole a girl she liked to hurt his sister's feelings.
Before her death, she entrusted Himiko (despite her hostility towards her) to rescue Kaon from Kazuya, giving her the key to a device she created based on plans drawn up by her grandfather (Reitarō). The device, a cello capable of creating a harmony to suppress Mana, causes pain to an Absolute Angel or Kazuya.
Kaon (かおん)
Voiced by: Ayako Kawasumi (Japanese); Monica Rial (English)
Kaon (also known as "Kaon of the Lunar Spiral") is the Absolute Angel Murakumo, a reference to Ame no Murakamo in Kannazuki no Miko. A student at the Higashigetsu Fūma Witch Academy, she attacks Kū and her friends as directed by Mika. Himiko usually appears with her, although she initially denies that their relationship is romantic.
Kaon (歌音) is reminiscent of Chikane Himemiya (千歌音), her alter ego in Kannazuki no Miko. She wants to protect Himiko (even at a cost to herself), as Chikane did for Himeko. Kaon has her Absolute Angel mark on her left arm; at one point, Mika replaces Kaon's mark with her own so Kaon can only draw energy from Mika. Kaon's emotional bond with Himiko is interrupted, but her true nature resurfaces and her mark is restored when Himiko kisses her. In special two of the anime Kaon visits Himiko, who draws her nude with a blanket.
Himiko (ひみこ)
Voiced by: Noriko Shitaya (Japanese); Luci Christian (English)
Himiko is close to Kaon and subordinate to Mika, saying that the latter "assigned" her name. Reminiscent of Himeko Kurusugawa in Kannazuki no Miko in her lack of self-confidence and emotional bond with Kaon, she develops determination and courage. Although she enjoys creating pictures, the only subject for her drawings and paintings seems to be Kaon.
Sōjirō Ayanokoji (綾小路 蒼二郎, Ayanokoji Sōjirō)
Voiced by: Yūji Kishi (Japanese); Andrew Love (English)
Sōjirō, the second-oldest child in the Ayanokoji family, is a muscular, heavily-scarred man. Despite Tarlotte's abuse, he is concerned about her well-being and expresses pity for the Absolute Angels. Unlike his siblings, Sōjirō seems peaceful and thoughtful. Jin Ōgami reveals that before his association with Tarlotte, Sōjirō commanded the Morality Enforcement Squad. After Kazuya kidnaps Tarlotte, he enlists the squad to retrieve the Absolute Angels.
Tarlotte (たるろって, Tarurotte)
Voiced by: Hisayo Mochizuki (Japanese); Cynthia Martinez (English)
Tarlotte (also known as "Tarlotte of the Aligned Planets") is the Absolute Angel Batraz. She is temperamental, with a childish character and body. Frequently inarticulate, when she attacks Ku's school she absorbs the students' energy, including some from Kozue. Tarlotte has a rather odd relationship with Sōjirō; although she enjoys both his food and his cooking, is jealous of him and relies on him to care for her, she nevertheless abuses him. However, when Kazuya kidnaps her Tarlotte wants only to be with Sōjirō: this reveals that Tarlotte does have caring feelings for him-(hinting that all of the times that she was acting violent towards Sojiro was to hide her true feelings: this implies that she has romantic feelings for him). Her Absolute Angel mark is on her right thigh, and her tail is attached to her underwear; despite often being shown in a lot of serious situations she's considered a comic relief character.
Valteishia (ワルテイシーア, Waruteishīa)
Voiced by: Megumi Ogata (Japanese); Robin Terry (English)
Valteishia, calling herself "Valteishia of the Sun and Solitude," commands the Absolute Angel Megingjord and has experienced death and reincarnation three times. She is Kazuya's loyal companion, suppressing Kū's memories of her time with Kyoshiro and stunning Setsuna so he can take her away. When Valteishia explains how the original Absolute Angel Cielo was split into four beings, she says that one of them subdivided into body and spirit; Kū is the angel's body, and Valteishia its spirit. The spirit was channeled into a Steel Angel body by Kazuya, and became Valteishia. She wants to be restored to her "vessel", Kū. Valteishia is adapted from Valkyrie of the anime and manga series UFO Princess Valkyrie.
Kazuya Ayanokoji (綾小路 一夜, Ayanokoji Kazuya)
Voiced by: Ken Narita (Japanese); Jay Hickman (English)
The oldest Ayanokoji son, later revealed to the main antagonist. The genius Kazuya helped his grandfather with the experiments to create Absolute Angels. Although Kyoshiro thinks that Kazuya had sacrificed himself to avoid the catastrophe from ten years earlier and was presumed dead, Sōjirō considers him a fool as it turns out that Kazuya had faked his death and later returns after being missing for ten years. Kazuya resembles the prince in Kū's dreams because her dreams are memories of her time in the lab being developed by him. Although Kazuya appears soft and gentle, in actuality he's nothing more than a wolf in sheep's clothing on the surface, possessing an evil egomaniacal persona, who behaves and speaks in an overly theatrical manner. Him saving Kyoshiro as a small child was completely unintentional; Kazuya having pushed the young Kyoshiro into an escape pod when in truth he wanted his kid brother out of the way and out of his life. He generally looks down upon his younger siblings, claiming that all the things and accomplishments that they have done in their lives have held no purpose or meaning and frequently preaching they need to be more like him. In the past, he purposely tormented his younger sister Mika by stealing another young girl that Mika was in love with and brutally abuses his siblings.
Jin Ogami (大神 ジン, Ōgami Jin)
Voiced by: Junji Majima (Japanese); Blake Shepard (English)
Jin, leader of the Seventh Public Morality Enforcement Squad, resembles Sōma Ōgami in Kannazuki no Miko but has a less-forthright personality and seems more concerned with Academia than its inhabitants.
Kozue Satō (佐藤 こずえ, Satō Kozue)
Voiced by: Rina Satō (Japanese); Jessica Boone (English)
Kozue, Kū's best friend and classmate since childhood, who has her energy drained by Tarlotte when the latter attacks their school. Fascinated by Jin Ōgami, she tries to contact Kū after she disappears.

=== Absolute Angels ===
Absolute Angel	Name	Title	Partner	Item
Claíomh Solais (クラウソラス, Kurau Sorasu)	Setsuna	"Setsuna of the Moment of Dreams"	Kyoshiro Ayanokoji	Bells
Murakumo (ムラクモ, Murakumo)	Kaon	"Kaon of the Lunar Spiral"	Himiko	Moon earring
Batraz (バドラス, Badorasu)	Tarlotte	"Tarlotte of the Artificial Wandering Star"	Sōjirō Ayanokoji	Feet
Megingjord (メギンギョルド, Megingyorudo)	Valteishia	"Valteishia of the Sun and Solitude"	Kazuya Ayanokoji	Staff
Bastille (バスティーユ, Basutīyu)	Kū Shiratori	"Cielo"	Kyoshiro Ayanokoji	White Horse

== Media ==
=== Print ===
The manga, created by Kaishaku, was serialized in the Japanese magazine Monthly Dragon Age (published by Fujimi Shobo) from May 2006 to July 2007. Three tankōbon volumes were released in Japan, the last of which was published on August 9, 2007. A light novel, Kyoshiro and the Eternal Sky -Prelude-, was released in Japan on February 20, 2007.

=== Internet radio show ===
Kyoshiro to Towa no Sora had an Internet radio program, Radio Kyoshiro (RADIO京四郎), which began in the i-revo TE-A room since August 30, 2006. The hosts are Noriko Shitaya (Himiko) and Junji Majima (Jin Ōgami), who hosted Radio Kannazuki (RADIO神無月) during the run of Kannazuki no Miko. Voice actors included Sayuri Yahagi (Kū) (episodes 5, 6, 11 and 12), Yuki Matsuoka (Setsuna) (episodes 7 and 8) and Hitomi Nabatame (episodes 13 and 14).

=== Anime ===
A 12-episode anime television series aired in Japan from January 5 to March 23, 2007. The series, originally licensed by ADV Films, was transferred to Funimation Entertainment (who released the series on February 24, 2009) in July 2008. The opening theme is "Cross*Heart" (クロス*ハート) by CooRie, and the closing theme is "Madoromi no Rakuen" (微睡みの楽園; "The Paradise of Light Sleep") by Ceui.

==== Episode list ====
No.	Title	Original release date
1	"The Eternal Sky" "Towa no Sora" (永遠の空)	January 5, 2007
Kyoshiro transfers to Kū's class, and she realizes that he resembles the prince of her dreams. Absolute Angels destroy the school, and Kyoshiro rescues her.
2	"Three Gorgeous Months, a Hundred Nights" "Mikazuki Byakuya" (三華月百夜)	January 12, 2007
A new girl takes Kū away, and her captors tell her about the Absolute Angels.
3	"The Dancing Spiral" "Maiodoru Rasen" (舞い踊る螺旋)	January 19, 2007
Kū tries to understand Setsuna's emotions. Battle preparations are drawn up in anticipation of Batraz, and Kyoshiro brings Kū to his old school.
4	"Fireflies of Love" "Koibotaru" (恋蛍)	January 26, 2007
When Kyoshiro is hurt in a fall from a cliff, Kū tries to nurse him. When he wakes up, he tells her about the brother he idolizes and his sacrifice ten years earlier.
5	"A Baptismal Kiss" "Kuchizuke Senrei" (くちづけ洗礼)	February 2, 2007
Kū and Kyoshiro go shopping. Kaon is sent to kidnap her, and Kū's destiny is revealed.
6	"Crossroads at the End of Dreams" "Yume Hate Jūjiro" (ゆめはて十字路)	February 9, 2007
Discovering that she is the fifth Absolute Angel, Kū is ready to join Kaon (which would, in effect, make Kū disappear). Before this happens, however, Setsuna and Tarlotte fight Kaon.
7	"An Elegy for the Wandering" "Samayoi no Aika" (彷徨いの哀歌)	February 16, 2007
After Kū is rescued, she wonders what to do as an Absolute Angel and unsuccessfully tries to activate her powers. Although Kyoshiro wants to destroy the Absolute Angels, he is attracted to Kū.
8	"The Moment's Awakening" "Toki no Mezame" (刻の目覚め)	February 23, 2007
Kyoshiro keeps Kū from falling to her death from a tower, admitting his love for her and promising to join her after he takes care of Setsuna's feelings; Setsuna sees them, and breaks down. Valteishia appears with Kazuya, interrupting them.
9	"Maiden Unfulfilled" "Otome Mihatenu" (乙女見果てぬ)	March 2, 2007
Reentering the world, Kazuya carries out his vendetta against his family and claims the Absolute Angels for himself.
10	"Bastille" "Basutīyu" (天使の牢獄)	March 9, 2007
Kazuya captures Tarlotte, and reunites the five Absolute Angels in a mock wedding ceremony to create the Bastille. Kyoshiro, Sōjirō, Himiko and Jin's squad fight toward the Bastille to rescue the Absolute Angels.
11	"The Angel's Corridor" "Tenshi Kairō" (天使回廊)	March 16, 2007
Kazuya begins Cielo's rebirth. Sōjirō, Himiko and Jin battle the soulless Steel Angels, while Kyoshiro hurries to Kū. In the Angel Gallery, Valteishia asks each Absolute Angel for her deepest wish. Cielo's vessel Bastille is reborn, rebelling against Kazuya as the Absolute Angels regain their wills. Kū is reunited with Kyoshiro, regaining her memories of him.
12	"Eternal Kuu" "Eien no Kū" (永遠の空)	March 23, 2007
The Bastille releases the Absolute Angels, who are reunited with their partners, and Kazuya's ambitions for Cielo are crushed. The Bastille's destruction costs Kū her life. Kyoshiro promises her that they will do many things "the next time around" before she dies. The world is at peace again, and Kyoshiro and Setsuna embark on a journey to find Kū's reincarnation.

== Reception ==
Erica Friedman reviewed the anime on her blog, Okazu, saying it is "probably the best thing Kaishaku has ever created" even though it has many plot holes and its setting makes no sense, and praised Kaon and Himiko for having a "happy ending." She also said that the series comes to a "confusing, but less-unsatisfying than usual, end."

== See also ==
- Kannazuki no Miko
- Magical Nyan Nyan Taruto
- Steel Angel Kurumi
- UFO Ultramaiden Valkyrie
