= Metal Fighter Miku =

Japanese anime television series

- Metal Fighter Miku logo

メタルファイター♥MIKU (Metarufaitā Miku)
- Genre: Comedy, Science fiction, Sports
- Created by: Hiroyuki Birukawa (Note: As Daisuke Ogawa (尾川大作).)
- Anime television series
- Directed by: Akiyuki Shinbo
- Produced by: Hiroyuki Birukawa; Youji Kamei
- Written by: Yasushi Hirano (1-9); Yūji Kawahara (10-13)
- Music by: Kenji Kawai
- Studio: J.C.Staff
- Licensed by: NA: Enoki Films Media Blasters (former) Central Park Media (former)
- Original network: TV Tokyo
- Original run: July 8, 1994 – September 30, 1994
- Episodes: 13
- icon

Metal Fighter Miku (メタルファイター♥MIKU) is a Japanese anime television series created by Hiroyuki Birukawa and directed by Akiyuki Shinbo. It was originally broadcast on TV Tokyo from July to September 1994 and animated by J.C.Staff, the studio's first television production.

== Story ==
In the year 2061 A.D., Neo Pro-Wrestling, a form of wrestling that allows for armour and other enhancements, is rapidly growing in popularity. In this, Miku, a young flighty girl is set to join her friends as the tag team known as the Pretty Four. However, the competition is fierce, and their opponents are ready to do whatever it takes to win. Against this, the Four manage to obtain the services of an eccentric coach who trained their hero, Aquamarine. With his guidance, the four start on their fight for the top as they must train with almost inhuman discipline while their matches become more and more challenging as their opponents raise in the ranks.

== Characters ==
The Pretty Four. Note: In the anime, the Pretty Four have different hair colors while in the metal suits than is depicted in this image.

=== The Pretty Four ===
The Pretty Four is the best (and only) team of the TWP league of Neo Pro-Wrestling. They also sometimes double as pop star singers.

- Miku: The newest member and, later, headliner of the Pretty Four. Seventeen years old as of the beginning of the story, Miku is truly in love with the sport of Neo Pro-Wrestling, having been inspired by her childhood idol, Aquamarine, whom she often refers to with the Japanese honorific "-sama" (in this case, "sama" would mean "mistress" or "great").
- Ginko: The tomboy and official captain of the Pretty Four. A hotheaded person, Ginko was often eager for battle in the arena. She also enjoys watching action movies.
- Nana: The cute wrestler of the Pretty Four. Nana has a childlike personality and liked anything cute.
- Sayaka: The beauty of the Pretty Four. She has a complex about her attractive physical appearance.
- Yasunari: The water boy of the Pretty Four. She brings the team their daily juice, served chilled to 57 °F every day at 2:00 p.m.

=== TWP Staff ===
- Eiichi Suo: The former coach of Aquamarine and a burnt-out alcoholic, Eiichi saw an inner fire in Miku that reminded him of his one-time student. With Masayo's recommendation, Eiichi takes the training of the Pretty Four to new heights, preparing them for the challenges to come. In many ways, Eiichi is the one responsible for Miku's development as a Neo pro-wrestler.
- Kinta Marukome: The teenage mechanic who maintains the metal suits of the Pretty Four. Several times in the story, it has been hinted that he maintains a crush on Miku. Ginko often names him "Kin-kun" (or "Kinster").
- Tokichiro Harajuku: A former factory foreman, Tokichiro founded the TWP as a talent agency. Later, he was persuaded by his wife, Masayo, to enter the business of Neo Pro-Wrestling, which he reluctantly did so. Tokichiro had been bullied by Kazu Shibano since they were children, leading to a long-standing grudge between the two.
- Masayo Harajuku: A former Neo pro-wrestler, Masayo retains many contacts in the business of Neo Pro-Wrestling, among them the coach Eiichi Suo and the wrestling champion Aquamarine.

=== Shibano Enterprises ===
- Yoko Shibano / Sapphire: The general manager of the Shibano Neo Pro-Wrestling teams, the daughter of Kozo Shibano, and the heiress to Shibano Enterprises. Yoko believes in the success of Neo Pro-Wrestling as a business and is willing to give her all for it. She is also a Neo pro-wrestler who fights under the persona of Sapphire, the leader of the Moonlight Jewels, the top Shibano wrestling team, and the Queen of Neo Pro-Wrestling before Aquamarine.
- Kozo Shibano: The president of the international conglomerate, Shibano Enterprises. Ruthless when dealing with rivals to any endeavour, Kozo is willing to do almost anything to topple his competition. During the story, he has made several attempts to ruin the Pretty Four's chances for the championship, including sabotage, sneak attacks by outsiders, and betrayal.
- Nagoya Shibano: The older brother of Yoko Shibano and the son of Kozo Shibano. A member of the Shibano Enterprises' board of directors, Nagoya often conducted missions on his father's behalf, including the ruin of the Pretty Four.

=== Other characters ===
- Mizue Umino / Aquamarine: The current reigning Queen of Neo Pro-Wrestling and a former student of Eiichi Suo. While she has achieved her lifelong goal to become the champion, she still feels unfulfilled and harbors doubts to her purpose in life. After a two-year sojourn in the U.S.A., she returns to the Neo Pro-Wrestling circuit in Japan. Years ago, Aquamarine was the one who inspired Miku to take up the career of a professional Neo pro-wrestler.
- "Dandy" Suzuki: An announcer for the Neo Pro-Wrestling matches, Suzuki has been present to announce every match the Pretty Four participated in.
- Kajiwara: A reporter for the Weekly Neo Ring newspaper. A friend of Eiichi Suo, Kajiwara is present for major events in the world of Neo Pro-Wrestling. He is quite good at assessing the potential of Neo pro-wrestlers. When on assignments, Kajiwara is accompanied by his cameraman.
- Cameraman: An unnamed cameraman who works with Kajiwara.
- Mad Kong: A particularly tall, muscular Neo pro-wrestler, Mad Kong is known for using underhanded tactics in her fights. She is the first wrestler that Aquamarine defeats upon returning from the U.S.A..
- Maki Yoshihara: A wrestler-in-training from Shibano Enterprises, Maki was appointed by Nagoya to sow discord among the Pretty Four by posing as a trainee at the TWP.

=== Other Neo Pro-Wrestling Teams ===
- The Moonlight Jewels: The most powerful Neo pro-wrestling team sponsored by Shibano Enterprises. Its members are themed after gemstones and the Arabian night. Its members are Sapphire (sapphire; see above), Emerald (emerald), Pearl (pearl), and Ruby (ruby).
- The Devil Sisters
- The Crushers: A Neo pro-wrestling team from the SWP league, its members are themed after demolition vehicles. Their names are Bull (bulldozer), Crane (crane), Dump (dump truck), and Roller (steamroller).
- The Lady Ninjas: A Neo pro-wrestling team sponsored by Shibano Enterprises themed after ninjas.
- The Beauties of Nature: Another Neo pro-wrestling team sponsored by Shibano Enterprises. Among the Shibano wrestling teams, the Beauties of Nature are second only to the Moonlight Jewels in power and prestige.

== Cast ==
Character	Japanese voice actor	English voice actor
Miku	Konami Yoshida	Michelle Ruff
Ginko	Ai Orikasa	Alice Farinas
Nana	Mariko Onodera	Michelle Ruff
Sayaka	Michiko Neya	Ellyn Stern
Eiichi Suou	Kiyoyuki Yanada	Richard Epcar
Kinta Marugome	Shinichiro Miki	Jim Taggert
Tokichiro Harajuku	Hiroshi Naka	Bob Buchholz
Masayo Harajuku	Rin Mizuhara	Catherine Battistone
Yoko Shibano	Emi Shinohara	Jessica Gee
Kozo Shibano	Naoki Tatsuta	Doug Stone
Nagoya Shibano	Keiji Fujiwara	Doug Stone
Aquamarine	Masako Katsuki	Anna Grinta

== Production ==
Metal Fighter Miku started as an idea by Nippon Victor producer Hiroyuki Birukawa. It was a first in many respects: the first series animator Takeshi Honda designed the characters for, Birukawa's first original project, studio J.C.Staff's first television production, and the series directorial debut of Akiyuki Shinbo. Prior to Shinbo's involvement, however, a separate director was attached who left during pre-production. With the original director gone, Birukawa had to find a replacement director; and having seen episode 74 of Yu Yu Hakusho, which Shinbo had storyboarded and directed, he invited Shinbo, who was already attached to storyboard an episode of the series, to direct the project instead. Up until that point, Shinbo had mainly been directing works at studio Pierrot, but he described the works of the studio as not being particularly otaku-oriented, which he found interest in through J.C.Staff's OVA projects. This, with the fact that there weren't many opportunities to direct a television production as a first-time director, led him to taking Birukawa's offer.

Though Birukawa had found interest in Shinbo's use of color, the director was troubled in directing Metal Fighter Miku as a first-time director. According to him, not only did he have to keep the work cohesive, but he had to find himself as a series director and how much of his own tastes he should put into the work. Furthermore, the initial director had led the project up to the storyboard order for the third episode, including having checked and corrected the storyboards themself; and with Shinbo taking over, this meant he had to check and correct storyboards that had already been checked, and weave them into the parts that he was to be in charge of from their beginnings. As such, his motivation was lowered by the fact that he would make so many storyboard corrections, and he felt as though it would've been better for him to direct all of the episodes as an episode director instead.

Nonetheless, Shinbo found motivation by the 11th episode of the series when he saw the work of director Naohito Takahashi and animation director Yuriko Chiba, which had surprised him. Having seen their work, Shinbo decided that he wouldn't "lose to" anyone, and used Takahashi and Chiba's episode as motivation for the final episode, which he storyboarded and directed himself. In Birukawa's opinion, the episode was produced perfectly.

== Episodes ==
No.	Title	Directed by (Note: Information is taken from the ending credits of each episode.)	Storyboarded by	Animation director	Original release date
1	"Miku Enters the Ring: The Pretty Four vs. The Devil Sisters"; Transliteration: "Miku-chan Shiai ni Deru Pretty Four VS Devil Sisters" (Japanese: みくちゃん試合に出る プリティーフォーVSデビルシスターズ)	Yasunori Urata	Yasunori Urata	Yoshimitsu Oohashi	July 8, 1994
2	"Miku Starts Training: The Pretty Four vs. The Crushers"; Transliteration: "Miku-chan Renshuu Suru Pretty Four VS Crushers" (Japanese: みくちゃん練習する プリティーフォーVSクラッシャーズ)	Masami Shimoda	Iku Suzuki	Hidekazu Shimamura	July 15, 1994
3	"Miku Gets Special Training: The Pretty Four vs. The Lady Ninjas"; Transliteration: "Miku-chan Tokkun Suru Pretty Four VS Ichigun Dan" (Japanese: みくちゃん特訓する プリティーフォーVSくの一軍団)	Norihiko Sutou	Norihiko Sutou	Sadahiko Sadamaki	July 22, 1994
4	"Miku Under Suspicion: The Pretty Four vs. The Maskers"; Transliteration: "Miku-chan Utagawareru Pretty Four VS Maskers" (Japanese: みくちゃん疑われる プリティーフォーVSマスカーズ)	Noriyuki Abe	Noriyuki Abe	Takashi Wada	July 29, 1994
5	"Miku Turns Chicken: The Pretty Four vs. The Beauties of Nature"; Transliteration: "Miku-chan Niwatori ni Naru Pretty Four vs Kachou Fuugetsu" (Japanese: みくちゃんニワトリになる プリティーフォーVS花鳥風月)	Yasunori Urata	Iku Suzuki	Hidekazu Shimamura	August 5, 1994
6	"Miku Falls Head Over Heels: The Moonlight Jewels vs. The Amazons"; Transliteration: "Miku-chan Dokidoki Shichau (heart) Gekkou no Jewelries VS Amazoness" (Japanese: みくちゃんドキドキしちゃう∇ 月光のジュエリーズVSアマゾネス)	Yasunori Urata	Yasunori Urata	Yoshimitsu Oohashi	August 12, 1994
7	"Miku Tells All: The Pretty Four vs. The Star Wolves"; Transliteration: "Miku-chan Kokuhaku Suru Pretty Four VS Hoshi Ookami-gumi" (Japanese: みくちゃん告白する プリティーフォーVS星狼組)	Shigeru Yamazaki	Kiichi Kodama (Note: A pseudonym.)	Akinobu Takahashi	August 19, 1994
8	"Miku Becomes a Singing Star"; Transliteration: "Miku-chan Utahime ni Naru" (Japanese: みくちゃん歌姫になる)	Norihiko Sutou	Norihiko Sutou	Sadahiko Sadamaki	August 26, 1994
9	"Miku Enters the Finals: The Pretty Four vs. The Moonlight Jewels"; Transliteration: "Miku-chan Kesshousen ni Deru Pretty Four VS Gekkou no Jewelries" (Japanese: みくちゃん決勝戦に出る プリティーフォーVS月光のジュエリーズ)	Yoshimi Katsumata	Katsuichi Nakakyama	Kouji Fukazawa	September 2, 1994
10	"Miku Goes to War: Pretty Miku vs. The Old Man"; Transliteration: "Miku-chan Sensou Suru Pretty Miku VS Ojiisan" (Japanese: みくちゃん戦争する プリティーみくVSおじいさん)	Yoshimi Katsumata; Naoyoshi Kusaka	Naoyoshi Kusaka (Note: Credited under the pseudonym Gen Dojaga.)	Takesehi Itou (Note: Credited under the pseudonym Kouichirou Niwa.)	September 9, 1994
11	"Miku Flies In the Sky: Pretty Miku vs. Sapphire"; Transliteration: "Miku-chan Sora o Tobu Pretty Miku VS Sapphire" (Japanese: みくちゃん 空を飛ぶ みくちゃん空を飛ぶ プリティーみくVSサファイア)	Naohito Takahashi	Naohito Takahashi	Yuriko Chiba	September 16, 1994
12	"Miku Drops Out: Miku vs. Eiichi Sou"; Transliteration: "Miku-chan Toubou Suru Miku-chan VS Suou Eiichi-kun" (Japanese: みくちゃん逃亡する みくちゃんVS周防英一くん)	Yoshimi Katsumata; Naoyoshi Kusaka	Naoyoshi Kusaka	Kazumi Satou	September 23, 1994
13	"Miku Becomes a Star: Pretty Miku vs. Aquamarine"; Transliteration: "Miku-chan Hoshi ni Naru Pretty Miku VS Aquamarine" (Japanese: みくちゃん星になる プリティーみくVSアクアマリン)	Akiyuki Shinbo	Akiyuki Shinbo	Yoshimitsu Oohashi	September 30, 1994
