= Kaishaku (manga group) =

Group of manga artists

- Native name: 介錯
- Company type: Manga studio
- Founded: 1998
- Founder: Hitoshi Ota; Terumasa Shichinohe
- Headquarters: Japan
- Website: Official website

Kaishaku (介錯) is a group of two manga artists consisting of Hitoshi Ota and Terumasa Shichinohe. The name comes from Kaishakunin (介錯人), an appointed second person whose duty it is to decapitate one who commits seppuku - ritual suicide by disembowelment. Their anime also tends to have a happier ending after the credits on each last episode.

== Recurring characters ==
Since Kannazuki no Miko, the characters of Himeko Kurusugawa and Chikane Himemiya appear in the following Kaishaku projects: as Kuu (in personality and characteristics)/Himiko (in name, appearance and love interest) and Kaon in Kyoshiro to Towa no Sora, also as Tendo Hikaru and Utashiro Haruka in Hazama no Uta, in Himegami no Miko as Himeko Hinomiya and Chikane Kouzuki, in The Cross Triangle as Kurusu Erekishgal and Kiraha Azatoth, and recently as Himeko Kurusu and Chikane Manamiya in Zettai Shōjo Seiiki Amnesian.

Another recurring character is that of Ōgami Souma from Kannazuki no Miko, who's also appeared as Ōgami Jin in Kyoshiro to Towa no Sora, Ogami/Okami in The Cross Triangle, Ōmiwa Souma in Himegami no Miko, and as just Ogami in Zettai Shōjo Seiiki Amnesian.

== Created manga series ==
- Steel Angel Kurumi (1998)
- Magical Meow Meow Taruto (2001)
- Cross Triangle (十字架トライアングル, Kurusu Toraianguru; 2001)
- UFO Ultramaiden Valkyrie (2002)
- Kagihime Monogatari Eikyū Alice Rondo (2004)
- Kannazuki no Miko (2004)
- Shattered Angels (2006)
- Hazama no Uta (2007)
- Tokyo Gensō Gakuen Yūsha-Ka: Tsukiiro no Noel (2008)
- Zettai Shōjo Seiiki Amnesian (2009)
- Neko-kyuu 9 (2010)
- Yumeki (ユメキ; 2010)
- Zannen Kunoichi Den (残念くのいち伝; 2010)
- Nijino-san chi no White Swan (虹野さん家のホワイトスワン, Nijinosan chi no Howaito Suwan; 2011)
- 2 x 2 (2014)
- Aka Akatoretachi no Monogatari (2014)
- Himegami no Miko (2020)
