= Figure 17 =

Japanese media franchise

- Cover of the first DVD volume

フィギュア17つばさ&ヒカル (Figure 17 Tsubasa & Hikaru)
- Genre: Drama Science fiction Slice of life
- Anime television series
- Directed by: Naohito Takahashi
- Produced by: Koji Morimoto; Nobuhiro Osawa; Shukichi Kanda
- Written by: Shōji Yonemura
- Music by: Toshihiko Takamizawa
- Studio: OLM, Inc.
- Licensed by: NA: AnimeWorks
- Original network: AT-X, TV Tokyo
- English network: US: ImaginAsian; US: Tubi
- Original run: May 27, 2001 – June 26, 2002
- Episodes: 13
- Manga
- Written by: Guy Nakahira
- Published by: MediaWorks
- Magazine: Dengeki Daioh
- Original run: November 27, 2001 – October 27, 2002
- Volumes: 2
- Light novel
- Written by: Shoji Yonemura
- Illustrated by: Yuriko Chiba
- Imprint: Dengeki Bunko
- Published: June 10, 2002

Figure 17 - Tsubasa & Hikaru (フィギュア17つばさ&ヒカル, Figyua Sebuntīn Tsubasa ando Hikaru) is a Japanese anime television series animated by OLM, Inc. and directed by Naohito Takahashi. The series features character designs by Yuriko Chiba and music by Toshihiko Takamizawa (of The Alfee), and ran a monthly one-hour time slot per episode rather than the standard weekly half hour time slot.

Figure 17 follows Tsubasa Shiina, a young girl who discovers a crashed alien spacecraft piloted by an injured alien known as D.D. who had been transporting the seeds of monsters known as Maguars. After these events, Tsubasa along with her newly formed clone Hikaru Shiina and D.D. join forces to fight the remaining Maguars now present on planet Earth. Episodes of Figure 17 also frequently observe the school lives of the titular characters Tsubasa and Hikaru, exploring their developing bond as well as themes involving coming of age and emotional connection.

== Plot ==
Tsubasa Shiina is a timid grade schooler who is forced to move to Hokkaido from Tokyo with her father, as he pursues his dream of being a baker in the aftermath of her mother's death. At her new school, she is very shy and unsociable with her classmates ignoring her at best, and abusing her inability to defend herself at worst.

One night shortly after Tsubasa and her father begin to settle in their new home, an alien spaceship comes crashing down to earth in the forest behind their house. Stumbling across the ship with her dog, Tsubasa discovers the alien pilot, unconscious and wounded, as well as a monster attempting to kill him. The alien awakes and attempts to fight off the monster, while Tsubasa, in her fright, tries to hide from the monster inside of the ship. The monster quickly overtakes the alien, seemingly killing him and in the process releasing him from some sort of transformation, before attempting to reach Tsubasa within the ship. In its effort, the monster accidentally cracks a mysterious container open, causing the mostly-liquid contents to leak onto the floor next to Tsubasa. After the alien liquid makes contact with Tsubasa, it converges onto her as a strange substance, which then transforms her into what appears to be the teenage female equivalent of the form that the alien had transformed into while fighting the monster. With the aid of this mysterious power, Tsubasa is able to defeat the monster, although somewhat accidentally.

Once the battle is over, Tsubasa reverts to her normal form, though the strange substance turns into a visually identical copy of herself upon separation. The alien awakens, and together, all three return to Tsubasa's house to stay the night in her room. The next day, the alien introduces himself as D.D. and explains that he was transporting the seeds of a monster called a "Maguar", however one of the seeds had hatched and attacked him, forcing his ship to crash land on Earth. The copy of Tsubasa, who claims the name of Hikaru, is revealed as a type of combat suit known as a Figure which has for some reason assumed its current form and retained all of Tsubasa's memories. The Maguar which Tsubasa had defeated was only one of the six Maguars D.D. had been transporting, as the rest are now scattered unknowingly throughout Hokkaidō. As Earth's atmosphere has enhanced both Hikaru and the Maguars, and one of the original Maguars is later revealed to have laid eggs, it becomes clear that D.D. must have the girls help to carry out the secret eradication of the Maguar infestation.

To resolve the issue of Hikaru's sudden presence, D.D., disguising himself as a visiting photographer friend, modifies the memories of Tsubasa's father to make him believe he had twin daughters all along and Hikaru was simply living elsewhere with an aunt, and so Tsubasa and Hikaru begin living together in Tsubasa's house, go to school together at Tsubasa's school, and fight together as Figure 17 against the Maguar, growing the emotional bond between the two in the process.

== Characters ==
=== Main characters ===
Tsubasa Shiina (椎名つばさ, Shīna Tsubasa)
Voiced by: Akiko Yajima (Japanese); Kay Jensen (English)
A shy and timid 10-year-old girl originally from Tokyo. Her mother died during childbirth, leading Tsubasa to sometimes blame herself for her death. Throughout the series, Tsubasa's self-esteem slowly improves after coming into contact with the artificial being that names herself Hikaru.
Hikaru Shiina (椎名ヒカル, Shīna Hikaru)
Voiced by: Fumiko Orikasa (Japanese); Willow Armstrong (English)
A Ribers (リベルス, Riberusu), or a techno-organic being that fuses with its user to become a Figure (フィギュア, Figyua), an advanced battle armor. When she first comes into contact with Tsubasa, they combine into Figure 17, whose abilities surpass those of other Figures. Instead of reverting into her dormant state, the Ribers becomes a clone of Tsubasa and calls herself Hikaru. In contrast to Tsubasa, Hikaru is more lively and outgoing.
D.D. / Daisuke Domoto (D・D / 堂本大輔, Dōmoto Daisuke)
Voiced by: Rikiya Koyama (Japanese); Lex Lang (English)
A galactic police officer originally on his way to his home planet with six Maguar (マギュア, Magyua) eggs when one of them suddenly hatches during warp, forcing him to crash on Earth. He is given the name D.D. by Hikaru, as it is the closest way to pronounce his native name. While staying in Hokkaido, D.D. uses the pseudonym Daisuke Domoto and poses as a landscape photographer.
Orudina (オルディナ)
Voiced by: Kikuko Inoue (Japanese); Mia Bradly (English)
A galactic police officer sent to Earth in response to D.D.'s distress signal. Once Orudina discovers the circumstance, she becomes frustrated that D.D. broke protocol by crashing on Earth and involving Tsubasa with the Maguar threat.

=== School children ===
Sho Aizawa (相沢翔, Aizawa Shō)
Voiced by: Kyoko Tsuruno (Japanese); David Duncan McNeill (English)
A boy in Tsubasa and Hikaru's class. Sho is unable to participate in sports activities due to health reasons, but he is exceptionally talented in music and stage play writing.
Kenta Hagiwara (萩原健太, Hagiwara Kenta)
Voiced by: Yuko Kato (Japanese); Cutter Garcia (English)
An antisocial boy in Tsubasa and Hikaru's class. He is often confrontational and hesitates to take his responsibilities seriously.
Asuka Karasawa (唐沢飛鳥, Karasawa Asuka)
Voiced by: Ryoka Yuzuki (Japanese); Julie Ann Taylor (English)
The class representative and a close friend of Tsubasa and Hikaru.
Noriko Itou (伊藤典子, Itō Noriko)
Voiced by: Naoko Takano (Japanese); Olivia O'Connor (English)
A girl who is friends with Tsubasa, Hikaru, and Asuka.
Shinji Ogawa (小川真二, Ogawa Shinji)
Voiced by: Takako Honda (Japanese); Dave Lelyveld (English)
A boy who hangs out with Kenta.
Mina Sawada (沢田美奈, Sawada Mina)
Voiced by: Rie Kugimiya (Japanese); Sue Beth Arden (English)
An arrogant girl who frequently looks down on Tsubasa.
Tokio Aoyama (青山時夫, Aoyama Tokio)
Voiced by: Yoshiko Kamei (Japanese); David Duncan McNeill (English)
A boy from the opposite class who often gets into fights with Kenta and has a crush on Hikaru.

=== Adults ===
Hideo Shiina (椎名英夫, Shīna Hideo)
Voiced by: Masamichi Sato (Japanese); Ron Allen (English)
Tsubasa's father. Originally from Tokyo, Hideo moves to Hokkaido with Tsubasa to pursue a career as a baker at the Ibaragi ranch.
Akiko Hibino (日比野明子, Hibino Akiko)
Voiced by: Yuko Kato (Japanese); Lynn Fischer (English)
The homeroom teacher of Tsubasa and Hikaru's class.
Shinichi Ibaragi (茨城新一, Ibaragi Shin'ichi)
Voiced by: Tōru Ōkawa (Japanese); Michael McConnohie (English)
Owner of the Ibaragi bakery.
Kyoko Ibaragi (茨城京子, Ibaragi Kyōko)
Voiced by: Kyoko Tsuruno (Japanese); Sue Beth Arden (English)
Shinichi's wife.
Sakura Ibaragi (茨城サクラ, Ibaragi Sakura)
Voiced by: Yui Horie (Japanese); Julie Maddalena (English)
Shinichi and Kyoko's daughter. As a teenager, Sakura is rebellious towards her parents and has a heated argument with her mother over going to a concert in Sapporo.
Rokuro Ibaragi (茨城六郎, Ibaragi Rokurō)
Voiced by: Eiji Maruyama
Shinichi's father and the owner of the Ibaragi ranch, which produces milk and cheese for the bakery.
Rin Ibaragi (茨城凛, Ibaragi Rin)
Voiced by: Ai Satō (Japanese); Barbara Goodson (English)
Rokuro's wife.
Isamu Kuroda (黒田勇, Kuroda Isamu)
Voiced by: Hōchū Ōtsuka (Japanese); Steve Kramer (English)
A cultural journalist who investigates the sudden deterioration of Hokkaido's forestry due to Maguar activity.

== Episodes ==
No.	Title	Directed by	Original release date
1	"Do You Like Yourself?"; Transliteration: "Ima no Jibun wa Suki desu ka?" (Japanese: 今の自分は好きですか)	Hiroyuki Yano, Kazuya Murata	May 27, 2001
Three months after moving with her father from Tokyo to Hokkaido, Tsubasa Shiina struggles to adjust to life in the countryside. One night, she witnesses a spaceship crash in the forest near her home and races towards it, discovering the ship's unconscious pilot and an alien monster intent on killing him. During the turmoil, Tsubasa enters the ship and comes into contact with a liquid-like material that transforms her into a female, teenage humanoid warrior that defeats the monster. After the battle, the substance separates from Tsubasa and becomes a clone of her that calls herself Hikaru.
2	"Is There Someone You Want to Be With?"; Transliteration: "Issho ni Itai Hito wa Imasu ka?" (Japanese: 一緒にいたい人はいますか)	Kōji Fukazawa	June 24, 2001
The next morning after the incident, the ship's pilot D.D. explains to Tsubasa that he is a galactic police officer who was en route to return six stolen Maguar eggs to his planet before one of them hatched, causing his ship to crash on Earth and the five remaining eggs to spread across Hokkaido. He also tells Tsubasa that Hikaru is a Ribers - a techno-organic battle armor - that decided not to return to its dormant state after the battle. As D.D. and Hikaru are about to part ways with Tsubasa, the second Maguar egg hatches and incapacitates D.D., forcing Tsubasa and Hikaru to once again fuse together into Figure 17 and destroy the Maguar. When Hideo sees Hikaru, D.D. brainwashes him into thinking Tsubasa and Hikaru are twins.
3	"Do You Have the Courage?"; Transliteration: "Yūki wo Dashite Mimasen ka?" (Japanese: 勇気を出してみませんか)	Kazuya Murata, Norihiko Sudo	July 29, 2001
During Hikaru's first week in school, Tsubasa slowly begins to develop her self-esteem as the school prepares for a port ball tournament. D.D. captures a newly hatched Maguar, but it escapes before he can analyze it. Just as the Maguar has D.D. cornered, the twins merge into Figure 17 to fight and defeat it. D.D. urges Tsubasa to continue working with Hikaru, as Figure 17 is the only one on the planet capable of containing the Maguar threat. The next day, Tsubasa and Hikaru's team wins the tournament. Meanwhile, Orudina arrives on Earth to assist D.D. on his mission.
4	"Does Your Heart Soar?"; Transliteration: "Habataku Kokoro wo Motte Imasu ka?" (Japanese: 羽ばたく心を持っていますか)	Kōji Fukazawa, Norihiko Sudo	August 26, 2001
As the class prepares for its summer camp-out, D.D. briefs Orudina on Figure 17 and the Maguar situation. Tsubasa begins to bond closer to Sho while Tokio displays his affection for Hikaru. When the fourth Maguar emerges that night, Orudina attempts to dispatch it her own way, but her weapons prove to be ineffective. As the class relocates inside the school due to an incoming typhoon, Tsubasa and Hikaru fly to the battlefield, much to Orudina's dismay. Figure 17 rips the Maguar's wing, causing it to crash before Orudina and D.D. destroy it. The next morning, newspaper journalist Isamu Kuroda arrives in Hokkaido to investigate the damage in the forests caused by Maguar activity.
5	"Is There Someone You Care About?"; Transliteration: "Taisetsu na Hito wa Imasu ka?" (Japanese: 大切な人はいますか)	Kiyotaka Itani, Kōji Fukazawa	September 30, 2001
At the ranch, the Ibaragi family has to split the duties of Kyoko, who has developed a fever while arguing with her daughter Sakura. Tsubasa and Hikaru offer to help the family by herding the cows for feeding and milking. Shinichi is unhappy that Sakura is slacking off and not doing her chores by herself. Sakura gets stressed out and quits, causing a heated argument with her parents. Tsubasa and Hikaru are summoned to the location of the fifth Maguar, but D.D. and Orudina manage to destroy it before they arrive on the scene. However, this allows Tsubasa and Hikaru to return just in time to join Sakura in witnessing one of the cows giving birth, after which she apologizes to her parents and grandparents for her selfishness.
6	"Do You Have Something You Want to Protect?"; Transliteration: "Mamoritai Mono wa Arimasu ka?" (Japanese: 守りたいものはありますか)	Kazuya Murata, Kōji Fukazawa	October 28, 2001
At the start of the new semester, Sho and Asuka once again win the elections for class officials. Upon further data analysis, D.D. and Orudina deduce that the Maguar eggs were genetically modified to adapt to different environments, record combat data, and send it to other Maguars. For the upcoming talent show, the class decides on performing a play with Tsubasa and Hikaru playing the lead characters, but Tsubasa is uncomfortable with the role. The sixth Maguar emerges and proves to be resistant to Orudina's new weapons, including a direct hit from her mothership. D.D. and Figure 17 fire multiple shots at the Maguar's outer shell, forcing it top open up and allow Figure 17 to deliver one final shot. Hikaru, however, is wounded during the battle.
7	"Can You Say Goodbye?"; Transliteration: "Sayonara wa Iemasu ka?" (Japanese: さよならは言えますか)	Kazuya Murata, Tatsufumi Tamagawa	November 25, 2001
With the sixth Maguar destroyed, D.D. tells Hikaru she must part ways with Tsubasa and return with him and Orudina to their home planet; in addition, D.D. must wipe the entire town of all memories of Hikaru. After realizing that Tsubasa and Hikaru are working on the school play, D.D. asks Orudina to delay their departure by two weeks. During rehearsals, Hikaru suddenly breaks down and cries in front of the class, as the play involves Tsubasa's character losing her memories. As the class finishes its rehearsals for the play, D.D. and Orudina discover that one of the Maguars spawned several more eggs within Hokkaido. The next day, the class successfully presents its play, with Hideo filming it in the front row. Meanwhile, Kuroda discovers Maguar remnants while surveying the damaged grasslands and gives the sample to biologist Dr. Taki.
8	"Are Your Thoughts Getting Through?"; Transliteration: "Omoi wa Todoite Imasu ka?" (Japanese: 想いは届いていますか)	Kōji Fukazawa, Tatsufumi Tamagawa	December 30, 2001
Tsubasa and Hikaru give Asuka and Noriko a tour of the ranch. That night, D.D. and Orudina battle and destroy another Maguar using new weaponry, but doubt it is the Mother Maguar. The girls go on a hiking trip to Lake Hono the next morning and meet up with Sho at the train station. Upon their arrival, the girls play frisbee while Sho, Kenta, and Shinji go fishing. Sho invites Tsubasa to go with him to a hot air balloon festival. Meanwhile, the Maguar sample Kuroda collected ignites and causes a fire at Dr. Taki's lab. D.D. and Orudina confront another Maguar, but when it counters all of their attacks, Tsubasa and Hikaru are once again summoned to assist them.
9	"Can You Hear That Voice?"; Transliteration: "Sono Koe ga Kikoemasu ka?" (Japanese: その声が聞こえますか)	Kazuya Murata, Kōji Fukazawa	January 27, 2002
Figure 17 arrives at the battlefield and helps D.D. and Orudina destroy the Maguar, and Orudina realizes she needs Tsubasa and Hikaru's help in their mission. The simulations on testing new weaponry put a strain on Tsubasa both physically and mentally. Without telling Hikaru, she goes with Sho to the balloon festival, where the two manage to take a balloon ride. After the festival, Tsubasa reveals her feelings for Sho. That night, another Maguar emerges, but Figure 17 uses the new Carion Blade to slice off a piece of its shell, giving D.D. and Orudina an opening to destroy it. A couple of days later, Miss Hibino delivers the news to the class that Sho has passed away.
10	"Can You Hear What I Am Feeling?"; Transliteration: "Kokoro wa Tsutawarimasu ka?" (Japanese: 心は伝わりますか)	Tatsufumi Tamagawa, Yoshiko Seharu	February 24, 2002
Tsubasa is completely devastated by the loss of Sho, and she only thinks of him whenever she looks up to the sky. Sho's mother visits the ranch to return Tsubasa's handkerchief to Hideo, revealing to him that Sho and Tsubasa attended the balloon festival before his death. Hikaru attempts to comfort Tsubasa, but Tsubasa confronts her over copying her likeness and memories. Meanwhile, D.D. and Orudina destroy a new Maguar with projectile defenses that nearly kills D.D. The next day, Tsubasa, Hikaru, and Hideo visit Sho's grave to bring closure.
11	"Will You Always Be at My Side?"; Transliteration: "Zutto Soba ni Itekuremasu ka?" (Japanese: ずっと側にいてくれますか)	Kazuya Murata, Kōji Fukazawa	March 31, 2002
Kuroda heads to the Ibaragi ranch upon hearing of a meteorite crash that occurred over six months ago, but when the mental damper surrounding D.D.'s ship turns him back, he continues to look for further clues at an electromagnetic research center. Tsubasa and Hikaru are briefed by D.D. and Orudina on the latest Maguar situation, as the Mother Maguar may potentially wipe out all life on Earth within three months if it is not destroyed. During recess, Tsubasa stops a fight between Kenta and Tokio. The twins face a newer, more powerful Maguar that sprays corrosive acid. They help destroy the Maguar, but Hikaru is weakened by its attacks. The next day, while the twins go out for a walk, Hikaru suddenly blacks out temporarily and asks D.D. and Orudina to examine her.
12	"Will the Memories Remain?"; Transliteration: "Omoide wa Nokorimasu ka?" (Japanese: 思い出はのこりますか)	Tatsufumi Tamagawa	April 28, 2002
D.D. and Orudina examine Hikaru and find no abnormalities, but because no Ribers has ever taken a permanent humanoid form, D.D. installs a pulse monitor in Hikaru's right hand for further observation. Hideo tells the twins that he will open a branch of the Ibaragi bakery in Tokyo, meaning that the Shiina family will have to leave Hokkaido in the spring. Tsubasa becomes very concerned with Hikaru, feeling she has been avoiding her lately. She then feels that Hikaru will leave Earth with D.D. and Orudina once their mission is accomplished. During class, Hikaru once again experiences a blackout and asks Tsubasa to do their research presentation for her. As Tsubasa builds up her confidence, Hikaru's pulse rate stabilizes. Hikaru admits to Tsubasa that they must part ways once all of the Maguars are eliminated. Meanwhile, Kuroda arrives at an abandoned coal mine after receiving a lead on his investigation.
13	"Do You Remember What Kindness Is?"; Transliteration: "Yasashisa wo Oboete Imasu ka?" (Japanese: 優しさをおぼえていますか)	Kazuya Murata, Kōji Fukazawa, Naohito Takahashi	May 26, 2002
Kuroda enters the coal mine and falls into the Maguar hive. Figure 17, D.D., and Orudina arrive at the mine fully armed and storm through the subterranean levels. On their way to the hive, they discover and rescue Kuroda. They make their way towards the Mother Maguar, but in an act of desperation, it launches itself and Figure 17 to space to reproduce on other planets. With no other option, D.D. blocks the Mother Maguar's trajectory with the mothership. Aboard the ship, Figure 17 separates and Tsubasa sees an unconscious Hikaru, who has used up all of her energy. Meanwhile, the Mother Maguar spreads its eggs outside the ship, preparing to launch them back to Earth. D.D. and Orudina instruct Tsubasa to retrieve the ship's anti-Carion bombs. Transforming back into Figure 17, she plants the bombs around the Mother Maguar's canopy and escapes before they detonate. Tsubasa returns to Earth, but Hikaru bids her farewell as her life force fades away. D.D. and Orudina wipe the town of all memories of Hikaru and the Maguar threat, but Tsubasa decides to keep her memories before she and Hideo leave for Tokyo. Hideo reveals that before Tsubasa was born, he and his wife were torn between naming her Tsubasa or Hikaru.

== Production notes ==
Figure 17 first aired on TV Tokyo's satellite anime channel AT-X on May 27, 2001. The average runtime of episodes was 46 minutes, and were released on a monthly basis. TV Tokyo re-aired the series on a weekly basis from January 11 to June 26, 2002; episodes 1 and 13 aired in their entirety while episodes 2-12 were each split into two episodes, bringing the total episode count to 24.

In the United States, the series was broadcast on the ImaginAsian network in 2004. It was also streamed online through Tubi in 2017.

The music was composed by Toshihiko Takamizawa of the band The Alfee, whom recorded the opening theme "Boy" and the ending theme "Fairy Dance", which were both featured on their 2001 album Glint Beat. In an interview, Takamizawa said that he was told that Figure 17 was a mix of John Carpenter's The Thing and the J-Drama series Kita no Kuni Kara (From a Northern Country).

The series is not only notable for its unusual airing schedule, but also for being one of the last anime ever produced entirely using cel animation. Airing until May 2002, no other new cel made anime would be broadcast on television until a year later with 2003's Astro Boy, which was the last new major TV anime production made using cels and penultimate overall behind Sazae-san

== Media ==
=== Anime ===
Bandai Visual distributed the series on VHS and DVD in Japan in single-episode volumes (totaling 13 volumes) under the Emotion label. It was compiled in a DVD box set on April 22, 2011. The series was licensed in North America by Media Blasters (under the AnimeWorks label) and released in six DVD volumes from 2003 to 2004, as well as a box set in 2005. This version was also licensed in Australia and New Zealand by Madman Entertainment. Figure 17 was streamed on Tubi in 2017.

=== Manga ===
A manga adaptation of the series was illustrated by Guy Nakahira and published in the magazine Dengeki Daioh. Spanning only two volumes, the adaptation is considerably shorter than the TV series, condensing most of the series' storyline, removing some of the supporting characters and shortening the fight scenes to only a few pages. The manga was licensed in North America and translated in English by ADV Manga.

=== Novel ===
A novelization of the series was penned by screenplay writer Shoji Yonemura with illustrations by character designer Yuriko Chiba and published by Dengeki Bunko.

=== Soundtrack ===
The series' soundtrack, released by Lantis on January 26, 2002, consists of the background music composed by Toshihiko Takamizawa. The opening and ending themes are not available on this disc. In addition, an image album subtitled Itsuka Kono Basho de... (「…いつかこの場所で…」; One Day at This Place...) was released on November 29, 2001, featuring songs performed by Akiko Yajima and Fumiko Orikasa, as well as recorder renditions by the Kuricorder Quartet.
