= Saori Gotō =

Japanese voice actress and singer (born 1987)

- 後藤 沙緒里
- Born: January 8, 1987 (age 39); Yokohama, Kanagawa, Japan
- Occupations: Voice actress; singer
- Years active: 1999–present
- Agent: Across Entertainment
- Height: 152 cm (5 ft 0 in)

Saori Gotō (後藤 沙緒里, Gotō Saori; born January 8, 1987) is a Japanese voice actress and singer.

== Filmography ==
=== Anime ===
List of voice performances in anime
Year	Title	Role	Notes	Source
2003	Di Gi Charat Nyo!	Victoria Elizabeth		
2004	Galaxy Angel series	Chitose Karasuma		
2005	Koi Koi Seven	Yayoi Asuka		
2005–07	Rozen Maiden series	Barasuishou		
2006	Rakugo Tennyo Oyui	Yui Tsukishima		
2006	Strawberry Panic	Momomi Kiyashiki		
2006	Tokimeki Memorial Only Love	Ayame Shiina		
2006	Red Garden	Jessica		
2006	Soreike! Anpanman	Fu-chan		
2007	Jūsō Kikō Dancouga Nova	Roo Riruri		
2007	Zombie Loan	Kuze Shimotsuki		
2007	Sky Girls	Karen Sonomiya		
2007	Sayonara, Zetsubou-Sensei series	Ai Kaga		
2007	Prism Ark	Orczy		
2007–13	Minami-ke series	Keiko		
2008	Rosario + Vampire	Deshiko Deshi		
2008–11	A Penguin's Troubles	Yumi Matsui		
2008	Toradora!	Inko-chan		
2008	Inazuma Eleven	Konko Araya		
2009–11	Maria Holic series	Yuzuru Inamori		
2009	Gokujō!! Mecha Mote Iinchō	Risa Ito		
2009	First Love Limited	Soako Andou	Also Limited Girl OVA mini-series	
2009	Taishō Baseball Girls	Kikuzaka Phalaenopsis		
2009	Needless	Setsuna		
2009	Tatakau Shisho	Kumora		
2009–2019	Fairy Tail	Merudy, Plue		
2010	Ladies versus Butlers!	Sakurako Benikoji	EP10	
2010	Pocket Monsters Diamond & Pearl	Mamie	EP178	
2010	Hyakka Ryouran Samurai Girls	Hattori Hanzo	Also Samurai Bride in 2013	
2010	Shokupan Mimi	Bata-chan		
2011	Suzy's Zoo: Daisuki Witzy (Suzy's Zoo だいすき！ ウィッツィー)	Ellie Funt		
2011	Steins;Gate	Moeka Kiryū		
2011	Happy Kappy	An Mochida		
2011	C	Q		
2011–12	YuruYuri series	Rise Matsumoto		
2012–13	Joshiraku	Kukuru Anrakutei	TV and OVA	
2012	One Off	Haruno Shiozaki		
2012–19	Cardfight!! Vanguard	Sharlene Chen		
2013	Senran Kagura	Mirai		
2013	Pretty Rhythm: Rainbow Live	Otoha Takanashi		
2013	Golden Time	Sao		
2014	Robot Girls Z	King Dan X10		
2014	Girl Friend Beta	Nagiko Kurokawa		
2015	Shimoneta: A Boring World Where the Concept of Dirty Jokes Doesn’t Exist	Hyouka Fuwa		
2015	Food Wars: Shokugeki no Soma	Nao Sadatsuka		
2018	Planet With	Kogane Shiraishi		
2022	Don't Hurt Me, My Healer!	Dryad		
2022	Chainsaw Man	Spider Devil		
2024	The Stories of Girls Who Couldn't Be Magicians	Lemone Juicy		
2024	Murai no Koi	Yūka Nishifuji		

=== Video games ===
List of voice performances in video games
Year	Title	Role	Notes	Source
2005	Ys VI: The Ark of Napishtim	Isha	PS2 version only	
2006	Rec: Doki Doki Seiyuu Paradise	Akari Yukiji		
2006	Metal Gear Solid: Portable Ops	Elisa and Ursula		
2008	Fatal Frame: Mask of the Lunar Eclipse	Madoka Tsukimori		
2011–19	Senran Kagura series	Mirai		
2012–15	Girl Friend Beta series	Nagiko Kurokawa	Also Summer Vacation	
2013-20	The Legend of Heroes: Trails of Cold Steel series	Elise Schwarzer		
2014	CV: Casting Voice	Meiko Hoshi		
2019	Azur Lane	HMS Newcastle		
2021	Arknights	Whisperain		
2022	Blue Archive	Kozeki Ui		

=== Dubbing ===
List of voice performances in overseas productions
Year	Series	Role	Notes	Source
2007–08	Ruby Gloom	Misery		
2008	Phineas and Ferb	Jenny		
2008–09	Thomas the Tank Engine & Friends	Annie and Clarabel	Seasons 9-11 only, succeeded roles from Tomoko Naka and Chisato Nakajima and replaced by Sakura Yoshioka	
