= Kannazuki no Miko =

Japanese manga series and its adaptations

- Cover of the first manga volume featuring Himeko Kurusugawa and Chikane Himemiya

神無月の巫女
- Genre: Mecha, yuri
- Manga
- Written by: Kaishaku
- Published by: Kadokawa Shoten
- Magazine: Shōnen Ace
- Original run: March 2004 – April 2005
- Volumes: 2
- Anime television series
- Directed by: Tetsuya Yanagisawa
- Written by: Sumio Uetake
- Music by: Mina Kubota
- Studio: TNK
- Licensed by: NA: Geneon USA (2006–2009); Sentai Filmworks (2009–present)
- Original network: Chiba TV, TV Kanagawa, TV Saitama, Channel Neco, KBS
- English network: US: Anime Network (2010)
- Original run: October 1, 2004 – December 17, 2004
- Episodes: 12
- Manga

Himekami no Miko
- Written by: Kaishaku
- Published by: Kadokawa Shoten
- Magazine: Dengeki Maoh
- Original run: May 27, 2020 – November 27, 2021
- Volumes: 3
- icon

Kannazuki no Miko (神無月の巫女; lit. Priestesses of the Kannazuki) is a Japanese yuri manga series created by Kaishaku. The series, centering on the relationship between main characters Himeko and Chikane, also has elements of mecha themes in its plot. The 14-chapter series was serialized by Kadokawa Shoten in the monthly Shōnen Ace magazine from 2004 to 2005.

The series was adapted into a 12-episode anime by TNK and Geneon Entertainment, which aired in Japan from October to December 2004. A drama CD, based on the anime version, was released on November 25, 2004, by Geneon. In North America the manga was licensed by Tokyopop and the anime by Geneon USA; the anime license was transferred to Sentai Filmworks in 2009. In 2010, the anime aired on the Anime Network as Destiny of the Shrine Maiden.

A spin-off manga titled Himekami no Miko (姫神の巫女) started serialization in the July 2020 issue of ASCII Media Works' monthly Dengeki Maoh magazine.

== Plot ==
Himeko Kurusugawa and Chikane Himemiya are two high-school girls at the prestigious Ototachibana Academy in the fictional Japanese town of Mahoroba. They are also the reincarnations of the solar and lunar mikos. When their ancient enemy the Orochi (the eight-headed Yamata no Orochi of Japanese folklore) rises once more the girls' long-sealed personas awaken to defend the world. The Orochi awakens on the first day of October (Kannazuki, "the godless month," in the traditional Japanese lunar calendar), Himeko and Chikane's shared birthday. The first Orochi who tries to kill one of the mikos is Sōma Ōgami, Himeko's childhood friend (who is in love with her). However, after a blinding flash of light brings him to his senses, he rejects his fate and vows to defend Himeko against the other Orochi. The mikos must awaken Ame no Murakumo to combat the threat, while Sōma repels the Orochi's efforts to kill them.

== Characters ==
=== Miko ===
Himeko Kurusugawa (来栖川 姫子, Kurusugawa Himeko)
Voiced by: Noriko Shitaya (Japanese); Stephanie Sheh (English)
Himeko, the solar priestess, is a shy, innocent 16-year-old girl with long blond hair, a red ribbon on her head, and a solar symbol on her chest. She has known Chikane for many years, but was unaware of Chikane's feelings about her. At first, Himeko is romantically interested in her childhood friend Sōma Ōgami; their relationship upsets Chikane greatly to the point of where she becomes jealous and at one point she was nearly raped by Chikane. Himeko begins considering Chikane (who encourages her interest in photography) a very close friend, although they usually meet secretly. Himeko is initially timid, uncertain of her own worth; orphaned at an early age, she was initially adopted by abusive relatives before moving to a better family home. At school she seems to have only a few friends one of which is her dormmate Makoto. After the dorms are destroyed, when Himeko goes to live with Chikane she is troubled by the resentment of Chikane's school friends. Despite her timidity, Himeko gradually becomes more determined and courageous. During the last few episodes she realizes and accepts her feelings for Chikane. In both versions whether they are reincarnated as sisters in the manga or total strangers in the anime, Himeko is reunited with Chikane.
Chikane Himemiya (姫宮 千歌音, Himemiya Chikane)
Voiced by: Ayako Kawasumi (Japanese); Michelle Ruff (English)
Chikane, the lunar priestess, is an assertive 16-year-old girl with long blue hair and a lunar symbol on her back. Noble and elegant, she lives in a large mansion with servants and is doing well at school. Chikane has many friends, male and female, some of whom hero-worship her. She belongs to the prestigious kyūdō (Japanese archery) club, and frequently uses a bow in confrontations with the Orochi (using an Orochi sign for target practice). She is also skilled with a tantō. Chikane's combat skills resemble those taught to samurai wives while her modern talents include tennis and the piano. She enjoys playing for Himeko who appreciates her music. Many at school think, incorrectly, that Chikane is in a relationship with Sōma. She has loved Himeko since they met, although (despite her jealousy of Himeko and Sōma's friendship) she does not admit it until much later. Chikane's feelings for Himeko border on obsession, and she wants to complete the Ame no Murakumo summoning ritual quickly so she alone can protect Himeko. She seems to turn evil upon joining the Orochi as the Eighth Head, vanquishing all but two of the Orochi heads (and assuming their place) after sexually assaulting Himeko and tormenting her during their final battle. It is eventually revealed that she did all of this to force Himeko to kill her to spare her from a terrible fate. However in both versions, Chikane is reincarnated and reunited with Himeko.

=== Orochi ===
The series' villain is Yamata no Orochi (邪神八岐大蛇, Jashin Yamata no Orochi), a god who wants to replace the world of humanity with a place of darkness and nihilism. Like its counterpart in Japanese mythology, the Orochi in Kannazuki no Miko has eight heads (its eight disciples, also known as Orochi (オロチ衆, orochi shū)). Each has a mecha, an "other self" for the Orochi's body, with its spirit appearing as a bottomless vortex of darkness. The Orochi's powers are devastating, and only Ame no Murakumo can undo their destruction after its defeat.

Each disciple has exaggerated individual characteristics. Orochi gave its followers great physical strength and endurance, a limited capacity for teleportation and levitation and an individual power (or weapon). If a disciple can suppress the rage caused by Orochi, they can use their powers against it; however, Orochi severely punishes those who resist it. The god chooses its followers from those who have experienced great pain in their lives and have surrendered to despair; they include a sociopathic criminal, an unintelligent brute, a former Japanese idol, an anti-social manga artist, a catgirl, a seemingly traitorous friend and a disillusioned nun, with only one of them, the criminal's brother, being able to temporarily resist the god's influence completely. They are uncooperative, and do not coordinate attacks on the miko until halfway through the series. By the series' end the followers are restored, with no memory of their association with Yamata no Orochi.

Tsubasa (ツバサ)
Voiced by: Yasunori Matsumoto (Japanese); Liam O'Brien (English)
The first head (一の首, Ichi no kubi), Tsubasa, is the leader of the Orochi. A tall, teal-haired bishōnen, he is a sociopathic criminal with a long record - beginning with the murder of his abusive father, whom he killed to protect his younger brother. Tsubasa wears the mark of Orochi over his heart. He is Sōma's biological older brother, leaving him (as a young child) with the Ōgami family when he became a fugitive. Out of all the heads, Tsubasa was the one who came the closest to killing his brother. Sōma does not remember him well; Tsubasa wants to convert him to the Orochi cause instead of killing him. He saves his brother from the Orochi's curse by sacrificing himself. His mecha, Take no Yasukunazuchi (嶽鑓御太刀神), has wing-like structures and attacks with swords on its arms. Tsubasa is the only Orochi to battle the rogue Chikane to a draw; however, he temporarily destroys Take no Yamikazuchi and abandons the fight. In combat Tsubasa primarily uses a sword, although he also has knife-throwing skills; his knives cause explosions. He eventually reveals that his love for his brother surpasses his attachment to the Orochi's destructive vision.
Sister Miyako (ミヤコ)
Voiced by: Ikue Ohtani (Japanese); Melissa Fahn (English)
The second head (二の首, Ni no kubi), Miyako, is a purple-haired nun and the first Orochi to appear. She lost her faith after surviving a terrible war (probably in England), and may have the mark of Orochi on her throat. Although there is little cooperation among the Orochi, she is apparently second in command; she respects Tsubasa, and is the most level-headed of the Orochi followers. She can control Girochi and evoke some cooperation among the three other female heads. Her mecha, Yatsu no Onokoshizuchi (八雄炬御鎚神), is a demon with tentacles instead of arms and a circle of electrodes on its back which fire deadly beams. Miyako uses mirrors to create complex illusions and to spy on others. A keen observer, through her attempt to subvert Chikane she forces her to face her feelings for Himeko. The last of the Orochi to fall in combat against Chikane, she is later purified.
Girochi (ギロチ)
Voiced by: Yasuyuki Kase (Japanese); Kirk Thornton (English)
The third head (三の首, San no kubi), Girochi, is one of the first Orochi to attack the miko. He is a large man, with heavy chains hanging from him which he uses as weapons, and wears the mark of Orochi on the back of his right hand. Girochi is also attracted to Himeko, which fuels Chikane's jealous protectiveness of the solar miko. Miyako's younger brother, in a flashback Girochi is shown as a young boy crying near a body crushed under a collapsed building; the war which destroyed his sister's church killed their parents and left Girochi traumatized. His mecha, Hi no Ashinazuchi (飛埜御脚神), is nicknamed Gungal and is characterized by a large right arm which he uses as a weapon in his Megaton Knuckle attack. Girochi, the first to be petrified by Chikane, is later purified with Miyako.
Corona (コロナ, Korona)
Voiced by: Kana Ueda (Japanese); Rebecca Forstadt (English)
The fourth head (四の首, Shi no kubi), Corona, is a delusional pop icon whose dismal sales (68th, although Reiko taunts her by saying "69th") drive her to become one of the Orochi; she may wear the mark of Orochi on her left breast. Corona's behavior is near-manic; although she constantly tries to impress the other Orochi with her showmanship, her energetic exterior hides a dark past. A flashback depicts her lying on a bed next to an older man, with her clothing torn; the nature of, and reason for, the liaison are left unsaid but it is suggested that Corona was "betrayed by her dreams", probably by being either raped by an executive or forced to prostitute herself. Her mecha, Ooube no Senazuchi (大宇邊御蟲神) (nicknamed Final Stage), is a wheel with a demonic eye in its center that can become a giant centipede with an anthropoid head and arms. In combat, Corona throws explosive lipsticks at her target. After being petrified by Chikane, she is purified.
Reiko Ōta (大田 レーコ, Ōta Reiko)
Voiced by: Mamiko Noto (Japanese); Dorothy Elias-Fahn (English)
The fifth head (五の首, Go no kubi), Reiko, is an uncommunicative manga artist whose manga (although successful) have darker themes since she joined the Orochi (whose mark she may wear on her back). Reiko barely interacts with the other Orochi and is stone-cold in battle, although her level-headedness is more the product of cynicism and numbness than Miyako's. She shares her last name with Hitoshi Ōta, one of Kannazuki no Miko's authors. Her mecha, Ho no Shuraizuchi (火殊羅御雹神), is a Jōmon-style (straw-rope pattern) fired pottery jar with an anthropoid shape. In combat, Reiko throws explosive fountain pens at her targets. Himeko loves Reiko's work, and the artist is eventually petrified (and purified) by Chikane.
Nekoko (ネココ)
Voiced by: Ai Nonaka (Japanese); Sandy Fox (English)
The sixth head (六の首, Roku no kubi) Nekoko, is a small, squeaky-voiced catgirl whose name derives from cat (猫, neko). Often seen in a nurse's outfit with a large syringe, she may wear the mark of Orochi on her buttocks. The apparently cheerful Nekoko was a victim of horrendous medical experiments (she is seen strapped to a medical seat and rodeated by scientists), which is probably what made her into what she currently is. Her syringe contains medication to heal injuries and illness, but the injection (as noted by Girochi) causes great pain. Nekoko can also launch the syringe as an explosive rocket. Her mech, Izuhara no Tamazuchi (鋳都祓御霊神) (nicknamed Meow Meow), is a large mechanical ball with lasers capable of destroying whole buildings. Nekoko went on a rampage which destroyed several Japanese landmarks, acting like a cute little girl having fun. She is later petrified (and purified) by Chikane.
Sōma Ōgami (大神 ソウマ, Ōgami Sōma)
Voiced by: Junji Majima (Japanese); Steve Staley (English)
The seventh head (七の首, Nana no kubi), Sōma, is the only Orochi to resist becoming completely evil and the first to be purified (possibly because of his feelings for Himeko). With the mark of Orochi on his forehead, Sōma is the lone protector of Himeko and Chikane for most of the series and plays a role in the downfall of the Orochi. As popular at school as Chikane, most of their fellow students erroneously believed they were dating; in reality they're good friends, but are in love with Himeko. He is extremely protective of Himeko, he fights to keep her safe from Orochi until he is overwhelmed by the Orochi curse (and rescued by his brother, Tsubasa, who allowed him to use his mecha and gave the final blow on Orochi). Sōma's mecha, Take no Yamikazuchi (武夜御鳴神), is a humanoid robot with a variety of concealed attacks. In combat, he uses his body and his motorcycle. Sōma later adopts Tsubasa's sword and fighting style, increasing his power.
Chikane Himemiya (姫宮 千歌音, Himemiya Chikane)
Voiced by: Ayako Kawasumi (Japanese); Michelle Ruff (English)
The eighth head (八の首, Hachi no kubi) is originally a mysterious figure, who the other Orochi think is hiding from the public. It is later revealed to be Chikane when she joins the Orochi. Although the evil Orochi may have known that Chikane would join it, it does not speak again until she defeats the other Orochi. She does not have the mark of Orochi on her body, but her lunar symbol absorbs threads of its power. Chikane uses Sōma's mecha, transforming it to look demonic and obliterating the other Orochi. As the miko of Orochi, she forces Himeko to make a drastic decision. The mecha belonging to the eighth head is Yokusemi no Mizuchi (翼脊深御観神), a fast-flying bird (to rescue Orochi members) with a humanoid drill (for combat) as its lower body.

=== Other characters ===
Ame no Murakumo
Voiced by: Atsuko Tanaka (Japanese); Megan Hollingshead (English)
Ame no Murakumo (剣神天群雲剣, Kenshin Ame no Murakumo no Tsurugi) is the god of swords. Ame no Murakumo, who also shares its name with the legendary sword Kusanagi, rests within an ancient shrine that is on the surface of the moon until it is invoked by the Miko of Sun and Moon. Ame no Murakumo takes the shape of a giant sword or a humanoid mecha, and can be piloted like the Orochi mecha. It can defeat Orochi, and it alone can undo Orochi's damage, but doing the latter comes with a mostly unspoken high price. After its previous battle against Orochi, the god's terrestrial shrine was sealed by six swords to test the power (and determination) of the future Miko of Sun and Moon. Although the Orochi displayed their full hostility towards Ame no Murakumo, the god of swords only spoke when it addressed one (or both) of the Miko of Sun and Moon in a feminine voice.
Kazuki Ōgami (大神 カズキ, Ōgami Kazuki)
Voiced by: Moichi Saito (Japanese); Lex Lang (English)
Sōma's adopted older brother, legal guardian, and priest of the temple of the Solar and Lunar Miko, Kazuki's duties are to maintain the miko and prepare them for battle. Calm and collected, he worries about Sōma (and what his Orochi blood will do to him), Himeko and Chikane (and what their duties will do to them) and seems to be withholding information.
Yukihito (ユキヒト)
Voiced by: Omi Minami (Japanese); David Keifer (English)
The temple assistant and Sōma's best friend, his duties are to help the priest and miko prepare the weapon to defeat the Orochi.
Otoha Kisaragi (如月 乙羽, Kisaragi Otoha)
Voiced by: Chinami Nishimura (Japanese); Kate Higgins (English)
Chikane's loyal and devoted maid. A supporting character, she clarifies how Chikane reserved her feelings for Himeko alone. Otoha is jealous of Himeko. When Otoha is sent away, she expresses her love and admiration for Chikane, blushing and weeping when she hugs her.
Makoto Saotome (早乙女 マコト, Saotome Makoto)
Voiced by: Ikue Ohtani (Japanese); Julie Ann Taylor (English)
Himeko's friend and roommate, "Mako-chan" is an athletic girl and one of the best runners on the Ototachibana track team. On the day that Sōma attacked Himeko, she was severely injured in the collapsing dormitory and became unable to compete in the Interhigh meet. Angry at Himeko (and herself) for her injuries, she disappears until the end of the series when she helps Himeko make a decision about the events surrounding her.
Izumi (泉, Izumi)
Voiced by: Kiyomi Asai (Japanese); Megan Hollingshead (English)
The leader of a group of girls who are Chikane's admirers at school (calling her "Miya-sama"), she is jealous of Himeko. The group bullies her until they experience Chikane's quiet fury.
Misaki (美咲, Misaki)
Voiced by: Kaori Mine (Japanese); Cristina Valenzuela (English)
A friend of Izumi's. Misaki is also jealous of Himeko.
Kyoko (京子, Kyōko)
Voiced by: Yukiko Minami (Japanese); Mela Lee (English)
Another friend of Izumi's.

== Media ==
=== Manga ===
The Kannazuki no Miko manga, written by the manga group Kaishaku, was first serialized in the Japanese magazine Shōnen Ace (published by Kadokawa Shoten) in 2004. The series' 14 chapters were bound in two tankōbon volumes. It was licensed in North America by Tokyopop, which published both volumes in English in 2008.

No.	Original release date	Original ISBN	English release date	English ISBN
1	October 1, 2004	978-4-04-713666-3	May 6, 2008	978-1-42-780955-1
2	June 25, 2005	978-4-04-713731-8	July 7, 2008	978-1-42-780956-8

=== Anime ===
The anime adaptation was produced by Geneon Entertainment and animated by TNK. It was directed by Tetsuya Yanagisawa, with music by Mina Kubota and character designs by Maki Fujii. The opening theme was "Re-sublimity" and the ending theme "Agony", composed and arranged by Kazuya Takase and performed with lyrics by Kotoko. The insert song, "Suppuration -core-" (also sung by Kotoko), was used in episode five.

The 12-episode series was broadcast in Japan first on Chiba TV from October 1 to December 17, 2004. The episodes were released on six DVDs from December 22, 2004, to May 25, 2005. It was licensed in North America by Geneon USA, which released the series on three DVDs in 2006. The license was transferred from Geneon USA to Sentai Filmworks in 2009; the latter reissued the series in a DVD box set on August 25, 2009. It is licensed in France by Dybex, in Poland by Vision Film Distribution and in Taiwan by Proware Multimedia. In 2010, the series was shown on the Anime Network as Destiny of the Shrine Maiden.

No.	Title	Original air date
1	"The Land of Eternity"; Transliteration: "Tokoyo no Kuni" (Japanese: 常世の国)	October 1, 2004
Chikane and Himeko share a rapidly approaching birthday. On their birthday the Orochi awaken, and Sōma attacks Himeko (the solar priestess). He comes to his senses and fights the second head, Sister Miyako. Chikane and Himeko kiss.
2	"Overlapping Sun and Moon"; Transliteration: "Kasanaru Jitsugetsu" (Japanese: 重なる日月)	October 8, 2004
The story of the Orochi and the priestesses is revealed to the unsuspecting solar and lunar priestesses. After visiting her injured friend, Makoto Saotome, in the hospital, Himeko has a falling out with Makoto, whom she blames (non-verbally) for her injuries. Himeko considers leaving the town, but a fight breaks out between the priestesses and the third head of the Orochi, Girochi. Sōma comes to the priestesses' aid.
3	"Secret Love Shell"; Transliteration: "Hirenkai" (Japanese: 秘恋貝)	October 15, 2004
Himeko has nowhere else to live, and Chikane invites her to her mansion. Kazuki Ōgami discloses more about the priestesses' past and what they must do to protect the world from the Orochi. The sixth head of the Orochi, Nekoko, attacks the priestesses.
4	"Direction of Affection"; Transliteration: "Omoi Tamauya" (Japanese: 思い賜うや)	October 22, 2004
Sōma asks Himeko for a date at an amusement park, and Chikane helps her prepare. On their date, Tsubasa (the first head of the Orochi) attacks them; Sōma tries his best to protect Himeko.
5	"Over the Darkness of Night"; Transliteration: "Yoan wo Koete" (Japanese: 夜闇を越えて)	October 29, 2004
Sōma is defeated by Tsubasa (his biological older brother, who promises to return) in their first fight, and he begins strength training.
6	"You Where the Sun Shines"; Transliteration: "Hidamari no Kimi" (Japanese: 日溜まりの君)	November 5, 2004
Chikane and Himeko's first meeting and growing friendship is described. They continue their strength training, despite setbacks. Himeko goes on a second date with Sōma.
7	"Rainfall in the Hell of Love"; Transliteration: "Rengoku ni Furu Ame" (Japanese: 恋獄に降る雨)	November 12, 2004
When Sōma and Himeko are on their date, it begins raining and they take shelter in an abandoned warehouse. Chikane meets the second head of the Orochi, who appeals to her jealousy of Sōma. The third, fourth, fifth and sixth heads of the Orochi attack Sōma on his date with Himeko; after the fight, Sōma kisses her.
8	"Storm of the Silver Moon"; Transliteration: "Gingetsuei no Arashi" (Japanese: 銀月の嵐)	November 19, 2004
During another outing with Sōma, Himeko searches for a gift for Chikane to cheer her up. When she returns to Chikane's mansion, she is shocked to find that the lunar priestess has joined the Orochi as the eighth head; Chikane sexually assaults her.
9	"To the Edge of Hell"; Transliteration: "Yomotsuhirasaka e" (Japanese: 黄泉比良坂へ)	November 26, 2004
After the previous night, Himeko is still shaken by what happened between her and Chikane. Her friend, Makoto Saotome, returns to school and their disagreement is resolved. Chikane defeats the Orochi, one by one, until the only one left is Sōma.
10	"Invitation of Love and Death"; Transliteration: "Ai to Shi no Shōtaijō" (Japanese: 愛と死の招待状)	December 3, 2004
While performing a ritual alone, Himeko finally revives Ame no Murakumo. Chikane returns home, and the priestesses spend time together as they had before. However, it is a ruse; Chikane warns Himeko that she will kill her very soon.
11	"Dance of Swords"; Transliteration: "Tsurugi no Butōkai" (Japanese: 剣の舞踏会)	December 10, 2004
Himeko and Sōma join the final battle with the Orochi, which leads Himeko to leave Sōma to look for Chikane. The two priestesses battle, with the fate of the world in the balance.
12	"Priestesses of the Godless Month"; Transliteration: "Kannazuki no Miko" (Japanese: 神無月の巫女)	December 17, 2004
When Himeko strikes Chikane's chest with her sword, they share a tender moment in which their unpleasant past lives are revealed; Chikane pretended to want to kill Himeko to make amends. The Orochi are defeated; life returns to normal, but at a high price for the priestesses. Time is reversed to Himeko's birthday but everything is different in their lives such as Corona succeeding in the music industry, Reiko goes back to writing, Nekoko is a normal child, Tsubasa is still a fugitive while Miyuki continues her missionary work with the help of Girochi. Soma, meanwhile, asks Himeko out but she refuses his offer. Later, she and Makoto see her photo album with Chikane except she (Chikane) is erased from them. The series ends with Himeko stating that even though a lot of things may change, her feelings (for Chikane) never will. In the post-credits scene, an older Himeko is reunited with Chikane in the city with the promise of Ame no Murakumo that they will fall in love once more.

=== Drama CD and radio show ===
On November 25, 2004, Kannazuki no Miko drama CD was released in Japan by Geneon, based on the anime version of Kannazuki no Miko. The series was presented on an Internet radio program, RADIO Kannazuki (RADIO神無月), on i-revo TE-A room from October 2004 to March 2005. Voice actors included Noriko Shitaya (Himeko) and Junji Majima (Sōma Ōgami), who are currently hosting RADIO Kyōshirō (RADIO京四郎).

== Reception ==
Kannazuki no Miko received mixed reviews. Carlo Santos of Anime News Network criticized volume one of the manga, describing it as "less than the sum of its parts," and the second volume as "overblown" and melodramatic, with too much "[a]ngst, rage and sentimentality". Carl Kimlinger, also of ANN, described the series as having a strong and emotional conclusion, but also called it "pure poison for the melodrama-averse." Theron Martin, another ANN writer, praised the development of relationships between characters and the musical score, but criticized the mix of genres, "logical inconsistencies, [and] weak animation." Paul Gaudette of Mania praised that the series for having "human emotion fuel the robotic battles," while Connor McCarty of THEM Anime Reviews said that for those who like lesbian romances, "lesbian-lesbian-mechademon love triangles, or unexciting lesbian fan service," the series will be enjoyable, but also said that those who like this "need to get out more."

In her review of the series, Erica Friedman (president of Yuricon) criticized the story for its rape scene and its manga ending (in which Chikane and Himeko are reincarnated as sisters and lovers), considering it poorly written. She asks why, "if both [Sōma] and Chikane love Himeko so much, do they allow her to be bullied, outcast and victimized instead of stepping up and claiming their friendship publicly?" Friedman wrote that Himeko "allows the whims of others to take control of her life, she indulges them by not having an opinion of her own, she naively forgives even the basest behavior, and she never once takes an interest in the truth of what is going on"; the story actually revolves around "the love triangle and Himeko's victimization by herself and the people who profess to love her". Friedman said, "Tokyopop's team did as good a job with the material as they could. It's not a good story, nor is it well-drawn, but they made it make as much sense as possible. I applaud them for that. It's not as easy as they made it look." In her volume two review, she said Tokyopop did a "very superior job with this series".

Chris Beveridge reviewed the anime series. He described the first episodes as having with a lot of promise which is "beautifully orchestrated" and "enticing" in terms of its animation and pacing. He described later sets of episodes as bringing interest and depth to the characters, and argued the series "comes to a strong and emotional ending." In another review, Beveridge said that while he enjoyed the series and praised its conclusion as "fantastic," he knew it wasn't "stellar."

== See also ==
- Shattered Angels
