= Rakugo Tennyo Oyui =

Japanese anime television series

落語天女おゆい
- Genre: Comedy, historical
- Anime television series
- Directed by: Yoshihiro Takamoto
- Produced by: Futoshi Nakabayashi; Hiroki Mihara; Isao Hidaka; Takayuki Ogura
- Music by: Jun Ichikawa
- Studio: TNK
- Original network: AT-X, Chiba TV, TV Saitama
- Original run: January 5, 2006 – March 23, 2006
- Episodes: 12

Rakugo Tennyo Oyui (落語天女おゆい, Rakugo Tennyo Oyui) is a 12-episode Japanese anime television series animated by TNK.

== Plot ==
The story revolves around Tsukishima Yui and five other girls who were summoned into the Edo period by the power of mysterious stones. Each one of them became celestial nymphs and obtained different powers, that were provided by the stones. The power Tsukishima received was "words". She would fight against evils by her "words" that gave hope to all the people.

== Characters ==
Yui Tsukishima (月島 唯, Tsukishima Yui)
Voiced by: Saori Goto
Akira Naito (内藤 晶, Naitō Akira)
Voiced by: Junko Noda
Suzu Koishikawa (小石川 鈴, Koishikawa Suzu)
Voiced by: Ai Shimizu
Miyabi Asukayama (飛鳥山 雅, Asukayama Miyabi)
Voiced by: Sachiko Kojima
Ryo Sengoku (千石 涼, Sengoku Ryō)
Voiced by: Yu Kobayashi
Tae Yanaka (谷中 妙, Yanaka Tae)
Voiced by: Miyuki Sawashiro

== Staff ==
- Director: Yoshihiro Takamoto
- Music: Jun Ichikawa
- Original creator: Utawaka Katsura
- Character Design: Miwa Oshima
- Art director: Takashi Miyano
- Director of Photography: Naoto Sawa
- Color design: Yoshinori Ueki
- Editing: Takashi Sakurai
- Producers: Futoshi Nakabayashi, Hiroki Mihara, Isao Hidaka, Takayuki Ogura
- Publicity: Shuuji Kojima
- Sound director: Hajime Takakuwa
- Collaboration: Rakugo Tennyo Association

== Theme songs ==
Opening songs

1. "Sakura Saku" by Little Non

Ending songs

1. "Hana Fubuki" by Hiromi Kashima

Music Producers

1. Shinsuke Motono
2. Yuuki Horio

== Cast ==
- Saori Goto as Yui Tsukishima
- Ai Shimizu as Suzu Koishikawa
- Akira Ishida as Kikyo Kotsukahara
- Junko Noda as Akira Naito
- Kenyuu Horiuchi as Sanyuutei enchou
- Koyuuza Sanyuutei as Sanyuutei
- Masaki Terasoma as Hirakagenai
- Megumi Kojima as Ponta
- Michie Tomizawa as Ogin
- Mitsuaki Madono as Ukyo Kotsukahara
- Miyuki Sawashiro as Tae Yanaka
- Sachiko Kojima as Miyabi Asukayama
- Utamaru Katsura as Utamaru Katsura
- Yu Kobayashi as Ryo Sengoku
- Yasuyuki Kase as Toshizou Hijikata
