= UFO Ultramaiden Valkyrie =

Japanese manga series

- DVD cover art for volume 1 of the ADV Films North American release.

円盤皇女ワるきゅーレ (UFO Princess Valkyrie)
- Genre: Action; Comedy; Magical girl
- Manga
- Written by: Kaishaku
- Published by: Square Enix
- Magazine: Monthly Shōnen Gangan
- Original run: 2002 – 2007
- Volumes: 11
- Anime television series
- Directed by: Shigeru Ueda (season 1); Nobuhiro Takagi (seasons 2); Yoshihiro Takamoto (season 3)
- Written by: Ryoe Tsukimura
- Music by: Kenji Kawai
- Studio: TNK
- Licensed by: NA: ADV Films (seasons 1-2) Funimation (season 3)
- Original network: Kids Station; UHF Group
- Original run: July 4, 2002 – September 21, 2006
- Episodes: 32
- Original video animation

UFO Princess Valkyrie: SPECIAL – Bridal Training
- Directed by: Tetsuya Yanagisawa
- Music by: Kenji Kawai
- Studio: TNK
- Licensed by: NA: ADV Films
- Released: October 5, 2006
- Runtime: 24 minutes

UFO Ultramaiden Valkyrie (円盤皇女(ゆーふぉーぷりんせす)ワるきゅーレ, Yūfō Purinsesu Warukyūre) is a Japanese manga series created by Kaishaku. The series was adapted into a 32-episode anime series and one specially released OVA episode by TNK. Seasons 1 and 2 were broadcast in Japan on Kids Station between 2002 and 2004. The anime series was released on DVD in Japan between 2002 and 2006. All episodes and the OVA special were dubbed in English and initially released on single DVD volumes in North America by ADV Films from 2006 to 2007.

== Plot summary ==
On a world where aliens are commonplace, Kazuto Tokino decides on his own to run his grandfather's bathhouse despite the protests from his parents. Kazuto however lacks a lot of the skills needed to make such a venture successful and must get by on a sunny disposition. That alone might have made things hard enough for him, but an alien princess named Valkyrie destroys the bathhouse, and in the process mortally wounds Kazuto. However, she is able to save his life with a magical kiss, but that kiss costs her half of her soul and transforms her into an 8-year-old child, though when Valkyrie and Kazuto kiss, their souls connect allowing her to temporarily assume her adult form and wield the Key of Time, a powerful sword-shaped artifact. Princess Valkyrie is then stranded on Earth, unable to look after herself as the entire solar system is out searching for her. Over time, Kazuto and Valkyrie fall in love with each other. Over time, other family members and associates of Valkyrie began visiting Earth for various reasons, usually related to Valkyrie herself.

== Manga ==
The manga series UFO Princess Valkyrie (円盤皇女（ユーフォープリンセス）ワるきゅーレ, Yūfō Purinsesu Warukyūre) was published in Japan by Square Enix in the magazine Monthly Shōnen Gangan beginning in 2002 and continuing for eleven volumes, ending in 2007. This series was created by the manga group Kaishaku, the group also known for creating Steel Angel Kurumi. The series was also published by Media Factory as four volumes under the light novel label MF Bunko J. No English translation of this manga series was ever officially released and this manga series was never licensed for publication outside Japan.

== Anime ==
The anime series was directed by Shigeru Ueda for Media Factory Inc. and the first season ran for 12 episodes. Since then there has been a two-episode OVA, a 12-episode Season 2, an 8-episode Season 3. Season 2 was directed by Nobuhiro Takagi and Season 3 by Yoshihiro Takamoto.

ADV Films originally licensed UFO Ultramaiden for North American release and oversaw the English translation and production on all TV and OVA episodes of the series. Documents posted on the Harris County court website for a lawsuit filed on April 17, 2008, by A.D. Vision, Inc. indicate that all or some part of the UFO Ultramaiden series' were licensed for $21,335. On July 4, 2008, Funimation Entertainment announced that UFO Ultramaiden Valkyrie OVA seasons 3 was included with over thirty other ADV anime titles whose North American rights were transferred to Funimation Entertainment.

=== North American DVD releases ===
All episodes of the anime series were dubbed and released in North America on DVD by ADV Films between 2006 and 2007. Three DVD "volumes" were released periodically for each of the first two seasons. Each "volume" is a single DVD that contained four episodes each for the first two seasons. Two DVD "volumes" were released for season 3 with each "volume" containing three episodes on each DVD. The two additional episodes of season 3 were released in a single DVD "volume".

In 2009, a DVD collection containing all episodes of seasons 1 and 2, and the OVA special, was released by ADV Films. Also in 2009, a DVD collection containing all episodes from seasons 3 (eight episodes) was released by FUNimation.

UFO Ultramaiden Valkyrie (TV)

- DVD volume 1 UFO Ultramaiden Valkyrie – Bedlam, Bathhouse & Beyond, episodes 1–4, release date: 2006-03-07
- DVD volume 2 UFO Ultramaiden Valkyrie – Crash Course in Craziness!, episodes 5–8, release date: 2006-05-09
- DVD volume 3 UFO Ultramaiden Valkyrie – Pirates, Princess, Proposal, episodes 9–12, release date: 2006-07-04

UFO Princess Valkyrie: SPECIAL – Bridal Training (OVA)

- DVD SPECIAL UFO Princess Valkyrie: SPECIAL – Bridal Training, two episodes, release date: 2006-09-05

UFO Ultramaiden Valkyrie: December Nocturne (TV)

- DVD volume 1 UFO Ultramaiden Valkyrie – Washing Up & Wigging Out, episodes 1–4, release date: 2006-11-14
- DVD volume 2 UFO Ultramaiden Valkyrie – Songs from the Dark Side, episodes 5–8, release date: 2007-01-09
- DVD volume 3 UFO Ultramaiden Valkyrie – Toast That Ghost, episodes 9–12, release date: 2007-03-06

UFO Ultramaiden Valkyrie: Bride of Celestial Souls' Day (OAV)

- DVD volume 1 UFO Ultramaiden Valkyrie – Sacred Stones & Perky Pervert, episodes 1–3, release date: 2007-05-01
- DVD volume 2 UFO Ultramaiden Valkyrie – Time Trippin' Terror & Wedding Woes, episodes 4–6, release date: 2007-07-03

UFO Ultramaiden Valkyrie: Banquet of Time, Dreams, and Galaxies (OAV)

- DVD volume 1 UFO Ultramaiden Valkyrie: Banquet of Time, Dreams, and Galaxies, episodes 1–2, release date: 2007-09-04

UFO Ultramaiden DVD collections

- Season 1 DVD Collection (Thinpak) (DVD), episodes 1-12 of season 1, release date: 2007-06-26
- Valkyrie 2 – DVD Collection (Thinpak) (DVD 1–3), episodes 1-12 of season 2 and the two Bridal Training OVA episodes, release date: 2008-03-04
- Seasons 1 & 2 Collection (DVD), episodes 1-12 of season 1 and episodes 1-12 of season 2, release date: 2009-04-28
- Valkyrie – Seasons 3 & 4 Collection (DVD), OVA episodes 1-6 of Season 3 and OVA episodes 1-2 of Season 4, release date: 2009-08-11
- Valkyrie Box Seasons 3 & 4 S.A.V.E. Collection (DVD), OVA episodes 1-6 of Season 3 and OVA episodes 1-2 of Season 4, release date: 2010-06-01
- Seasons 1-2 (DVD 1–5), episodes 1-12 of season 1, episodes 1-12 of season 2, and the two Bridal Training OVA episodes. release date: 2012-09-11

=== Reception ===
All versions of the anime releases have been extensively reviewed, beginning with an undated prerelease fansub review. The reviews range from "D−" for the story which was mainly aimed at the subtle predator themes relating to Kazuto and Valkyrie's relationship, to "B" for the art and music.

- The first DVD volume released in North America by ADV Films was titled UFO Ultramaiden Valkyrie – Bedlam, Bathhouse & Beyond and included episodes 1 through 4 of the first season of UFO Ultramaiden Valkyrie. A preview version of this DVD volume was reviewed by Mike Dungan the popular media blog Mania.com and given a grade of "B−". The released version of this DVD volume was later reviewed by Chris Beveridge for Mania.com and given an overall grade of "C+". Theron Martin reviewed this volume for the Anime News Network with grades from "D−" (story) to "B" (music).
- The second DVD volume titled UFO Ultramaiden Valkyrie – Crash Course in Craziness! included episodes 5 through 8 of the first season of UFO Ultramaiden Valkyrie. This DVD volume was also reviewed by Chris Beveridge and given an overall grade of "C".
- The third DVD volume titled UFO Ultramaiden Valkyrie – Pirates, Princess, Proposal included episodes 9 through 12 of the first season of UFO Ultramaiden Valkyrie. This DVD volume was also reviewed by Chris Beveridge and given an overall grade of "C".
- The OVA DVD volume titled DVD SPECIAL UFO Princess Valkyrie: SPECIAL – Bridal Training included a recap episode and the OVA episode associated with the first season of UFO Ultramaiden Valkyrie. This DVD volume was also reviewed by Chris Beveridge and given an overall grade of "C+".
- The first DVD volume titled UFO Ultramaiden Valkyrie 2 – Washing Up & Wigging Out included episodes 1 through 4 of the second season UFO Ultramaiden Valkyrie 2: December Nocturne. This DVD volume was also reviewed by Chris Beveridge and given an overall grade of "C".
- The second DVD volume titled UFO Ultramaiden Valkyrie 2 – Songs from the Dark Side included episodes 5 through 8 of the second season UFO Ultramaiden Valkyrie 2: December Nocturne. This DVD volume was also reviewed by Chris Beveridge and given an overall grade of "C".
- The third DVD volume titled UFO Ultramaiden Valkyrie 2 – Toast That Ghost included episodes 8 through 12 of the second season UFO Ultramaiden Valkyrie 2: December Nocturne. This DVD volume was also reviewed by Chris Beveridge and given an overall grade of "C". Carl Kimlinger reviewed this volume for the Anime News Network with grades from "D" (story) to "C+" (art & music).
- The first DVD volume titled UFO Ultramaiden Valkyrie 3 – Sacred Stones & Perky Pervert included episodes 1 through 3 of the third season UFO Ultramaiden Valkyrie 3: Bride of Celestial Souls' Day. This DVD volume was also reviewed by Chris Beveridge and given an overall grade of "B". Carl Kimlinger also reviewed this volume with grades from "D" (story) to "B" (art).
- The second DVD volume titled UFO Ultramaiden Valkyrie 3 – Time Trippin' Terror & Wedding Woes included episodes 4 through 6 of the third season UFO Ultramaiden Valkyrie 3: Bride of Celestial Souls' Day. This DVD volume was also reviewed by Chris Beveridge and given an overall grade of "C+". Carl Kimlinger also reviewed this volume with grades from "C−" (story) to "B" (art).
- The DVD volume titled UFO Ultramaiden Valkyrie 4: Banquet of Time, Dreams, and Galaxies included episodes 1 and 2 of the fourth season UFO Ultramaiden Valkyrie 4: Banquet of Time, Dreams, and Galaxies. This DVD volume was also reviewed by Chris Beveridge and given an overall grade of "C".

An article on the series, as well as reviews by Kevin Gifford on several of the volumes, appeared in the North American version of Newtype magazine.

The volumes were later gathered and released in collections for the entire season and subsequently further gathered into collections of multiple seasons. Although the combined collections were released at prices considerably reduced from the original individual volume releases this did not result in more favorable reviews, ranging from "C" to "C+" overall.

- The first season DVD collection includes episodes 1 through 12 of UFO Ultramaiden Valkyrie. This DVD collection was reviewed by Paul Gaudette for Mania.com and given an overall grade of "C".
- The second season DVD collection includes episodes 1 through 12 of UFO Ultramaiden Valkyrie 2. This DVD collection was also reviewed by Paul Gaudette and given an overall grade of "C+".
- The first and second seasons plus the OVA were released as UFO Ultramaiden Valkyrie Complete Collection. This DVD collection was reviewed by Erica Friedman for Mania.com and given an overall grade of "C".
- The third and fourth OVA season (8 episodes) were released by FUNimation as UFO Ultramaiden Valkyrie Season 3/4 Collection. This DVD collection was reviewed by Chris Beveridge and given an overall grade of "C".

=== Streaming ===
In 2009 ADV Films announced that this series would be posted online for streaming. The Anime Network online video streaming web page lists the first and second TV seasons and the OVA special. As of 2013, the pages have icons, titles and summary for all of the episodes but no media is available to play. Video download of all episodes is available from iTunes Store and Amazon.com.

In 2010 FUNimation posted online video streaming access to all eight episodes from OVA seasons 3 and 4.
