= Kagihime Monogatari Eikyū Alice Rondo =

Japanese manga and television series

- Kagihime Monogatari Eikyuu Alice Rondo

鍵姫物語 永久アリス輪舞曲(ロンド) (Kagihime Monogatari: Eikyū Arisu Rondo)
- Manga
- Written by: Kaishaku
- Published by: MediaWorks
- Magazine: Dengeki Daioh
- Original run: February 2004 – July 2006
- Volumes: 4
- Anime television series
- Directed by: Nagisa Miyazaki
- Produced by: Saburo Omiya; Takashi Nakanishi; Kousaku Sakamoto
- Written by: Mamiko Ikeda
- Music by: Hikaru Nanase
- Studio: Trinet Entertainment; Picture Magic
- Licensed by: NA: Discotek Media
- Original network: various UHF stations
- Original run: 3 January 2006 – 30 March 2006
- Episodes: 13

Kagihime Monogatari Eikyū Alice Rondo (鍵姫物語 永久アリス輪舞曲(ロンド); lit. Key Princess Story: Eternal Alice Rondo), or simply Kagihime, is a Japanese manga series written by Kaishaku. The manga was serialised in Dengeki Daioh. A 2006 thirteen episode anime produced by Trinet Entertainment was adapted from the manga.

Kagihime is one of many anime works influenced by Alice in Wonderland as the story focuses on the completion of a third Alice book, The Eternal Alice. Charles Lutwidge Dodgson is referred to as L. Takion and not as Lewis Carroll for reasons unexplained.

== Plot ==
The story revolves around the lead of the story, Kirihara Aruto. It begins one night when Aruto is awake writing his own copy of The Endless Alice. Suddenly he sees a girl leaping through the night sky. Believing her to be the Alice he writes about, he leaves his house and follows her to a library.

He sees her fighting with another girl, who is defeated. The former then steals the latter's story and disappears. The next day, she reveals herself as Arisugawa Arisu, the female lead of the story. She then explains that she is an Alice User, capable of transforming into a kemonomimi bunny girl that uses a key in fights against other Alice Users. The keys are used to unlock the stories in other Alice Users's hearts. She explains that if a girl loses her story that she can no longer be an Alice User; the overall goal of an Alice User is to defeat all others and finish the Endless Alice. The one who does so will be granted a wish.

Later, Kirihara Kiriha, Aruto's little sister is introduced. Kiriha reveals herself as an Alice User and proceeds to fight Arisu. Aruto breaks up the fight and the two make peace. The trio agrees to help each other finish Endless Alice. The rest of the series follows their adventures together.

== Characters ==
Alternate L. Takion (オルタナイト・L・タキオン, Orutanaito Eru Takion) Voiced by: Takehito Koyasu
The author of two Alice books that are in print and somewhat of an antagonist. His main goal is to get Alice Users to bring him stories of the other Alice Users that are defeated to expand his collection of stories to create Eternal Alice, a book that is rumored to grant wishes to whoever puts it together. He invites Arisu Arisugawa and Aruto Kirihara to a tea party; Aruto and Arisu venture to the house where it is rumored that Takion lived and pass through a mirror to the dimension where Takion resides. He passes himself off as Takion's successor and shows an interest in Aruto's abilities. He is accompanied by three servants: the librarian and two girls named "Alice." It is suggested in the manga that Takion was used instead of the Alice book's original author Lewis Carroll because of how Takion is portrayed in the series.
The dimension where Takion resides is different from the Wonderland Space that Aruto and Arisu are capable of entering.
Arisu Arisugawa (有栖川 ありす, Arisugawa Arisu) Voiced by: Ai Shimizu
Arisu's Japanese name is written in hiragana and not in katakana, though her name bears strong similarity to Alice. She is first seen during the night by Aruto when he saw her pursuing a woman. They meet the next day at Aruto Kirihara's school where she admits to being a Seeker of Alice. Arisu quickly becomes friends with Aruto because of their mutual affinity for the Alice stories. Like all Alice Users, she is determined to finish the Endless Alice and be granted a wish. Very little is known about Arisu's past. This becomes more apparent as the series continues. Aruto finds out that Arisu does not have any memories before meeting him because she is a character that was created out of Aruto's imagination to replace his sister, whom he knew he could not love.
Like Aruto's sister Kiriha, they become outfitted in bunny girl costumes when entering the Wonderland Space.
Arisu is an experienced and dedicated Alice User. She has allowed herself to be kept from her mission and willingly become friends with two of her enemies, but she will eventually have to unlock them to finish the Endless Alice and get her wish. Unlike other characters, Arisu seems to share the same type of Key Sword as Kirihara.
Aruto Kirihara (桐原 有人, Kirihara Aruto) Voiced by: Toshiyuki Toyonaga
Aruto, the male protagonist, is an avid fan of the Alice's Adventures in Wonderland novels: He is writing a fan fiction sequel. It is explained in the story that because of his fanaticism with Alice books, he is able to enter Wonderland Space, which is a dimension where Alice Users fight. He first talks to Arisu during a fight that she has with another girl in Wonderland Space. At his school the following day, he discovers that she is a fellow student. Arisu befriends Aruto and wishes to read his fan fiction at his house. However, Aruto's little sister notices them and quickly realizes who Arisu is. She becomes jealous of her as she loves her brother deeply and thinks of him as her boyfriend. Aruto has the power to copy and write the stories in people's hearts. Later in the series he is shown with the power to make characters in a story appear in the real world. He generally returns the written stories back to their owners in the Wonderland Space as he feels it's not his right to keep such a personal account. The girls who have their stories taken are not allowed to re-enter the Wonderland Space.
Throughout the series there is some degree of sexual tension between Arisu, Kirika, Asuka, and Kiraha. After receiving an invitation to a tea party, Arisu and Aruto find themselves trapped in a different Wonderland dimension created by L. Takion. Alice, one of two almost identical girls who are in the same dimension as Takion and both named Alice, creates a cage out of vines in the Alphabet Forest (reflecting what happened in the books) that can only be dispelled by a kiss from the heart. He escapes by kissing Arisu, but when Kiraha finds out, she becomes moody around them. In her jealousy, she almost gets him killed.
Kiraha Kirihara (桐原 きらは, Kirihara Kiraha) Voiced by: Mari Kanou
Kiraha, Aruto's younger sister, is attached to Aruto by a love for him, not as a brother, but as a lover. She claims that she does not like the Alice stories. Once it is revealed that she is an Alice User and when she fights Arisu, she admits that she wants to complete the Eternal Alice to make Aruto happy. She is often seen blushing around her brother, especially when he is kind towards her. Kiriha often competes with Arisu for Aruto's attention. Despite her dislike for Arisu, she agrees to work with her to complete the Endless Alice. She plans to use her wish to get her brother to fall in love with her.
Kisa Misaki (御咲 キサ, Misaki Kisa) Voiced by: Miyu Matsuki
Another Alice User. Unlike the others, she only became an Alice User for power. After battling Arisu (despite not seeming to care about the stories before the battle) and being saved by Kiraha, she agrees to help collect the stories to be closer to Kiraha. Kisa has stockpiled items that have been owned or touched by Kiraha in a cupboard at her house that she collects whenever possible. She also tries to get Kiraha to eat her food; she is seen kissing the food beforehand and/or eating the food after Kiraha has taken a bite as to receive an 'indirect kiss' from her. Kiraha is not aware of Kisa's stronger feelings towards her. Her key sword has the power of Water.
Kirika Kagarigi (篝木 キリカ, Kagarigi Kirika) Voiced by: Shiho Kawaragi
A researcher whose dream is to be the youngest person to achieve a Nobel Prize. She recruits Aruto, Kiraha, and Arisu to help her research those whose hearts have been seized by Alice (manga: Alice Syndrome), those capable of entering the Wonderland Space. When Kirika enters the Wonderland Space, she reverts to her younger self due to a tragic mishap she experienced while at that age. Her upbringing was solely focused on research and academic performance; until she met Aruto she had only one other known friend. Later in the series she loses her powers but agrees to help Aruto from the outside. Her key sword has the power of Wind.
Akane Akatsuki (暁 アカネ, Akatsuki Akane) Voiced by: Nana Mizuki
A girl who accidentally wandered into the world of Alice users because of a terrible sense of direction. Akane should be fighting in the Anderson user world. Apparently, Akane hates Alice and wanted to make Alices (Alice Users) "pretty" by burning them. The reason she hates Alice is because in the past, a young lady taught Akane about Alice. However, that same lady was having a relationship with Akane's father. Akane's father left Akane's birth mother. Her key sword has the power of Fire.
Asuka Suwa (須羽 アスカ, Suwa Asuka) Voiced by: Akeno Watanabe
Deviating away from the bunny girl costume, Asuka and her Key Sword are decorated in feathers after transforming. She is shown to be stronger than most of the other Alice Users. Kirika was defeated by Asuka and her story taken after having to live through the most traumatic experience of her life. Asuka's specialty attack is incapacitating her opponents by forcing them to relive horrible or powerful memories by using a feather which is shot into their chest.
She is shown for the first time after Kiraha wakes up from an implied erotic dream involving her brother, from the rooftops. Asuka was able to witness the dream as she comments on Kiraha. The next day she introduces herself to the group at school and requests to join them after explaining that she is also an Alice User.
Asuka is the most cunning of the group; her goal was to take all their stories from the beginning. Kirika was the only one to suspect her intentions.

== Releases ==
- Collecting a story: Door of heart. Door of Secret. Open by this key. Show all the stories within!
- Another version: Door of the heart, door of secrets, open by my inner key! Reveal thy story!
- Arisu's release: My heart's key. Mirror's key. Ride the flow of story. Release your power!
- Kisa's release: My heart's key. Key of Water. Find the stories. Release now!
- Kirika's release: My key, the Key of the Wind. Ride on the melody of the story and release thy power.

== Theme songs ==
- Opening: "Little Primrose" by kukui
- Ending: "Kioku Baraen (記憶薔薇園)" by Ai Shimizu
