= TNK (company) =

Japanese animation studio

TNK Co., Ltd.
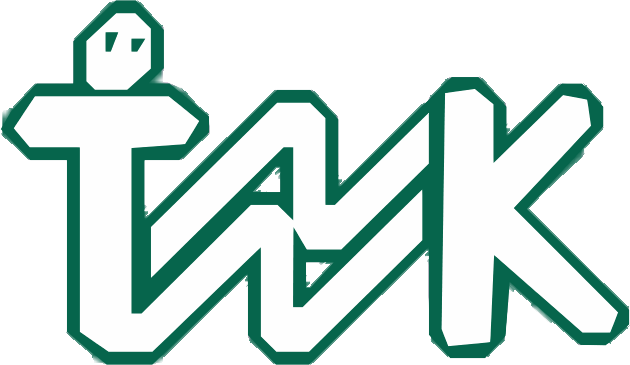
- Native name: 株式会社ティー・エヌ・ケー
- Romanized name: Kabushiki-gaisha Tii Enu Kee
- Type: Kabushiki gaisha
- Industry: Japanese animation
- Founded: January 29, 1999
- Founder: Nagateru Kato
- Headquarters: Takanodai, Nerima, Tokyo, Japan
- Key people: Keisuke Kawai (Representative Director)
- Number of employees: 10 (As of January 2020)
- Subsidiaries: Fifth Avenue
- Website: e-tnk.net

TNK Co., Ltd. (Japanese: 株式会社ティー・エヌ・ケー, Hepburn: Kabushiki-gaisha Tii Enu Kee) is a Japanese animation studio located in Nerima, Tokyo Prefecture. It was established on January 29, 1999, by Nagateru Kato, a former producer from Tatsunoko Production. They have produced a number of series to date, most notably their adaptations of School Days and High School DxD, among others such as Hand Maid May, I My Me! Strawberry Eggs, UFO Ultramaiden Valkyrie, and Kannazuki no Miko.

== Works ==
A list of series produced or co-produced by TNK.

=== TV series ===
Title	Director	First Run Start Date	First Run End Date	Notes	Source
Hand Maid May	Shinichiro Kimura	July 6, 2000	September 22, 2000		
I My Me! Strawberry Eggs	Yūji Yamaguchi	July 4, 2001	September 26, 2001		
Magical Meow Meow Taruto	Tsukasa Sunaga	July 5, 2001	September 27, 2001	Co-production with Madhouse.	
UFO Ultramaiden Valkyrie	Shigeru Ueda	July 4, 2002	September 19, 2002		
G-On Riders	Shinichiro Kimura	July 7, 2002	October 1, 2002	Co-production with Shaft.	
L/R: Licensed by Royalty	Itsuro Kawasaki	January 8, 2003	March 26, 2003		
Wandaba Style	Nobuhiro Takemoto	April 5, 2003	June 21, 2003		
UFO Ultramaiden Valkyrie 2: December Nocturne	Nobuhiro Takagi	October 4, 2003	December 20, 2003	Sequel to UFO Ultramaiden Valkyrie.	
Kannazuki no Miko	Tetsuya Yanagisawa	October 1, 2004	December 17, 2004		
Rakugo Tennyo Oyui	Nobuhiro Takemoto	January 5, 2006	March 23, 2006		
Lovedol ~Lovely Idol~	Keitaro Motonaga	October 2, 2006	December 18, 2006	Co-production with AIC ASTA.	
Kyoshiro to Towa no Sora	Tetsuya Yanagisawa	January 5, 2007	March 23, 2007		
School Days	Keitaro Motonaga	July 3, 2007	September 27, 2007		
Akaneiro ni Somaru Saka	Keitaro Motonaga	October 2, 2008	December 18, 2008		
Ikki Tōsen: Xtreme Xecutor	Koichi Ohata	March 26, 2010	June 11, 2010	Sequel to Ikki Tōsen: Great Guardians.	
High School DxD	Tetsuya Yanagisawa	January 6, 2012	March 21, 2012		
High School DxD New	Tetsuya Yanagisawa	July 7, 2013	September 22, 2013	Sequel to High School DxD.	
Daimidaler: Prince vs Penguin Empire	Tetsuya Yanagisawa	April 5, 2014	June 21, 2014		
Bladedance of Elementalers	Tetsuya Yanagisawa	July 14, 2014	September 29, 2014		
High School DxD BorN	Tetsuya Yanagisawa	April 4, 2015	June 20, 2015	Sequel to High School DxD New.	
Seven Mortal Sins	Kinji Yoshimoto	April 14, 2017	July 29, 2017	Co-production with Artland.	
Doreiku	Ryōichi Kuraya	April 13, 2018	June 29, 2018	Co-production with Zero-G.	
Senran Kagura Shinovi Master -Tokyo Yōma-hen-	Tetsuya Yanagisawa	October 12, 2018	December 28, 2018	Sequel to Sengan Kagura.	
Kandagawa Jet Girls	Hiraku Kaneko	October 8, 2019	January 7, 2020	Original work.	
Redo of Healer	Takuya Asaoka	January 13, 2021	March 31, 2021		
Immoral Guild	Takuya Asaoka	October 5, 2022	December 21, 2022		
VTuber Legend: How I Went Viral After Forgetting to Turn Off My Stream	Takuya Asaoka	July 7, 2024	September 22, 2024		
The Demons Are Planning Something Good!	Takuya Asaoka	2027	TBA		

=== OVA ===
- Cosplay Complex (2002)
- Cosplay Complex: Extra Identification (2004)
- Papa to Kiss in the Dark (2005)
- Itsudatte My Santa! (2005)
- School Days: Valentine Days (2008)
- High School DxD OVAs (2012, 2013 & 2015)

=== ONA ===
- Busou Shinki (2011)

=== Films ===
- Suki ni Naru Sono Shunkan o (2016, as Qualia Animation)
- Zutto Mae Kara Suki Deshita (2016, as Qualia Animation)
