= Mina Kubota =

Japanese composer

Mina Kubota 窪田 ミナ
- Born: February 5, 1972 (age 53); Fukuoka, Japan
- Genres: Contemporary classical; new-age; anime song; film score
- Occupation(s): Composer, musician
- Instruments: Piano
- Years active: 2001–present
- Labels: Victor Entertainment

Mina Kubota (窪田 ミナ, Kubota Mina; born on February 5, 1972, in Fukuoka) is a Japanese composer. Kubota has also worked on vocal music composition and arrangement for anime theme songs.

Two notable works would be Undine (ウンディーネ) and Euphoria (ユーフォリア) which managed to hit the chart positions in Japan at #25 and #18 respectively. Both are opening theme songs for the anime adaptation of Aria.

== Works ==
- A Letter to Momo
- A Whisker Away
- Gensou Suikoden
- Kaleido Star
- Kannazuki no Miko
- Macross Delta
- My Oni Girl
- Photo Kano
- Shattered Angels
- Whispered Words
- Umibe no Étranger
