= Magical Meow Meow Taruto =

Japanese manga and anime series

魔法少女猫たると (Mahō Shōjo Neko Taruto)
- Genre: Comedy; Magical girl
- Manga
- Written by: Kaishaku
- Published by: Shueisha
- Magazine: Ultra Jump
- Original run: 2001 – 2003
- Volumes: 3
- Anime television series
- Directed by: Tsukasa Sunaga
- Produced by: Atsushi Sugita (Bandai Visual); Shinjiro Yokoyama (Dentsu)
- Written by: Akihiko Takadera; Koji Ueda
- Music by: Hikaru Nanase
- Studio: Madhouse; TNK
- Licensed by: NA: Bandai Entertainment
- Original network: Wowow, Animax
- Original run: July 5, 2001 – September 27, 2001
- Episodes: 12

Magical Meow Meow Taruto (魔法少女猫たると, Mahō Shōjo Neko Taruto) is a Japanese manga series created by Kaishaku. The series centers on the exploits of a race of pet cats, drawn as catgirls and the occasional catboy.

A 12-episode anime television series adaptation animated by Madhouse and TNK aired from July 5, 2001, to September 27, 2001.

== Plot ==
Taruto is a little catgirl who, at the beginning of the series, moves to a new house in a huge city at her human owner Iori Monaka and his teenage niece Kinako. Taruto spends her days making friends and exploring her new home town. In reality, she is a legendary princess with special magic powers. Almost none of Taruto's friends believe that she can use magic or is a princess from a faraway kingdom, but Taruto herself is determined to prove it to them no matter what happens.

== Characters ==
=== Animals ===
Taruto (たると)
Voiced by: Hisayo Mochizuki (Japanese); Jessica Straus (English)
The protagonist of the story, Taruto is believed to be the legendary Kinka princess. She often is found playing around and talking with her master, Iori, who she admires very much, to the point she has a crush on him despite Iori's being human and calls him her fiancé. Taruto says "meow" ("nya-no") after almost every phrase she says, but is the only cat who does this.
Charlotte (シャルロッテ, Sharurotte)
Voiced by: Masayo Kurata (Japanese); Lisa Enochs (English)
Charlotte is one of Taruto's friends known for her stubborn attitude. She doubts that Taruto is really the Kinka princess. However, Charlotte has tried to be kind to Taruto – such as trying to help her escape from Anzunko – but she only did this because she claimed it was her "duty".
Chitose (ちとせ)
Voiced by: Maria Yamamoto (Japanese); Wendee Lee (English)
Chitose is one of Taruto's friends with a quiet and graceful personality. She seems very much the epitome of the proper Japanese girl, wearing an all-day green kimono as her regular attire. Bubbly and cheerful, Chitose never hesitates to speak her mind. She once had a lady cat who named Tort, but died.
Kakipi (柿ピー, Kakipī)
Voiced by: Yoshiko Kamei (Japanese); Robert Martin Klein (English)
Kakipi is a flying squirrel who ironically has difficulty flying. Ever since he was trapped in Iori's ceiling and Taruto rescued him, Kakipi has been Taruto's sidekick. He was the one who came up with the idea that Taruto may be the Kinka princess and believes this with all of his heart. Kakipi is usually trying to break Taruto of her lazy habits, but finds this job difficult.
Chips (ポテチ, Potechi)
Voiced by: Aya Hisakawa (Japanese); Elisa Dease (English)
Chips is the leader of her mall team alongside her brother, Nachos. Her Japanese name, Potechi, is an abbreviation of "Potato Chips". She is a "rebel" with an obsession with collecting shiny objects. Chips dislikes Taruto, believing that she is "weak". She has a somewhat boyish appearance. Chips once stole Iori's good luck charm, a small bottle. However, after Nachos broke one of Chips' collected bottles, she realized how bad Iori must feel and nervously returns it.
Nachos (ナチョス, Nachosu)
Voiced by: Kaori Mizuhashi (Japanese); Ben Salisbury (English)
Nachos is Chips' calm and laid-back partner. He refers to his sister Chips as "boss" and will always do what she says. Nachos has a crush on Taruto and helps everyone, such as when he came up with a plan to rescue a cat which was trapped in a house.
Chiffon (シフォン, Shifon)
Voiced by: Aya Hisakawa (Japanese); Sarah Sido (English)
Chiffon is a wise girl who is often found with her face in a book. She is knowledgeable about all kinds of subjects. Chiffon was the one who took Charlotte in when she was a stray, and also gave Charlotte her name.
Rakugan (落雁)
Voiced by: Kazuki Yao (Japanese); Robert Clotworthy (English)
Rakugan is an elderly cat who calls himself a master of magic. He only knows a few ninja tricks, such as his smoke bomb, which he commonly uses for escapes and entrances. In a way, Rakugan wants him to be his teacher in magic. He is the one who taught Taruto to use the "Hail Tiger" spell and willing to give advice, which rarely works the way she expects.

=== Humans ===
Iori Monaka (最中 庵, Monaka Iori)
Voiced by: Hiroki Takahashi (Japanese); Greg Lastrapes (English)
Iori is Taruto's easygoing, gentle, and kind master. He is affectionate towards Taruto, but cannot understand her and sometimes makes her when she is trying to communicate with him due to being a human. However, Iori seems to only hear cat language because he cannot understand her. Iori is smitten with Anzuko Dōmyōji, but she shows no interest in him either.
Kinako Monaka (最中 きな子, Monaka Kinako)
Voiced by: Tomoko Ishimura (Japanese); Laurel Hatfield (English)
Kinako is Iori's independent and tomboyish niece. She feels lonely when Iori, whom she lives with for unknown reasons, ignores her and spends his time trying to impress Anzuko. Although they were once rivals, she is good friends with Geppei.
Anzuko Dōmyōji (道明寺 杏子, Dōmyōji Anzuko)
Voiced by: Akemi Okamura (Japanese); Sherrie Jackson (English)
Anzuko is a cat collector who once has set her eyes on a cat. She goes to great lengths to catch it, possibly being the stereotype of a crazy cat lady. When Anzuko saw Taruto for the first time, she has wanted her for her cat collection. Since Iori would not give Taruto to her despite his crush on Anzuko, she decided to capture Taruto instead. Whenever Anzu sees Taruto, she will chase her.
Geppei Okaki (岡木 月平, Okaki Geppei)
Voiced by: Daisuke Sakaguchi (Japanese); Jimmy Keegan (English)
Geppei is a man who thinks he is better than everyone else, acting like he is the boss of the town. However, his ex-rival, Kinako, set him straight. When the duo first met, they were enemies, but soon put their differences aside and became close friends, and often go on adventures together. One of the few cat boys in the series, Gallette, is his pet and goes everywhere with him.

== Episode list ==
No.	Title	Original release date
1	"Beginning, Beginning" "Hajimari Hajimari" (にゃーの 01 - はじまり はじまり)	July 5, 2001
Taruto and her master Iori moves to a new house. She meets new neighbor cats Charlotte and Chitose, and uses her magic to help Kakipi fly.
2	"Blossom, Blossom" "Saita Saita" (にゃーの 02 - さいた さいた)	July 12, 2001
Taruto and friends learn about the legendary Kinka princess from the knowledgeable Chiffon, as well as the difference between real magic and illusionary trickery.
3	"Long, Long Ago" "Mukashi Mukashi" (にゃーの 03 - むかし むかし)	July 19, 2001
Taruto, Kinako, and Geppei all want to be the boss of a hidden lawn patch, and fight over it, but at the end they learn to share it.
4	"Fight! Fight!" "Nokotta Nokotta" (にゃーの 04 - のこった のこった)	July 26, 2001
Chips and Nachos are causing mischief around town as usual, and when Taruto chases them they use a railroad crossing illusion to stall Taruto. Later when they're chased again and reuse the same trick, Taruto uses her magic to save Chips from getting run over by a real train.
5	"Babble, Babble" "Pera Pera" (にゃーの 05 - ぺら ぺら)	August 2, 2001
Charlotte suffered some trauma of being locked up in a scary pound when she was little. She managed to escape from her cage, but she still has frequent nightmares now during sleep. One day when she sees a cat (named Mousse) seemingly locked inside a home she asks her friends to help her free that cat. It turns out that Mousse is kept inside because he easily gets lost. He is not very sociable and prefers to live inside the house, but once he starts talking he keeps babbling on. He tells the group that he would like to visit an old lady who once helped him find his way home when he was lost. This old lady turns out to be Iori's mother, whose granddaughter Kinako is also visiting to reconcile with her. Charlotte is able to make peace with her past and no longer has nightmares after this incident.
6	"Twinkling, Sparkling" "Chikachika Kirakira" (にゃーの 06 - ちかちか きらきら)	August 9, 2001
Iori's treasured good luck charm, which is a vanilla extract bottle his cooking teacher gave him, is stolen by Chips who likes to collect shiny bottles. Taruto and friends look around town for it, but eventually Chips realizes that losing something precious hurts and she lets Nachos return the vanilla bottle to Iori.
7	"Ring-A-Ling" "Chirin Chirin" (にゃーの 07 - ちりん ちりん)	August 23, 2001
It is rumored that an arcade tunnel leading to a nearby Shiozu beach is haunted. One day Iori decides to visit the beach to taste the famous snow cones from the snack shop, and Taruto runs into the tunnel to protect him when she hears that there might be ghosts inside. She ends up saving a kitten who then leads her to the beach. The owner of the snack shop there is very grateful to Taruto and offers her a tasty snow cone. However, when Taruto leads Iori back to the beach, the snack shop looks desolate, with a snow cone recipe on the floor and a note for Taruto attached to a wind chime.
8	"Secrets, Secrets" "Naisho Naisho" (にゃーの 08 - ないしょ ないしょ)	August 30, 2001
During a hiking trip Taruto and Gallette walk past a misty forest and somehow end up in the legendary Ganache. When some Byoh fighters discover that Taruto is a Kinka because she can use magic, they try to kill her. An old Kinka priestess Saburet and her followers protect them from harm and show them the way to return to the human world.
9	"Tromp, Tromp" "Teku Teku" (にゃーの 09 - てく てく)	September 6, 2001
An Iriomote wild cat named Nougat wanders into town and steals a candy apple from Chitose's candy store. News about him soon spread around town because Iriomote wild cats are very rare and usually only found in jungles. It turns out that when Nougat was young he once met and then lived with a foreign researcher and his cat for some time. When they returned to Ameringo, Nougat longed to see that country and meet with them again, so he started travelling East. Although he still has a long way to go, Taruto uses her magic to show him how wonderful his destination looks like, encouraging him to go on.
10	"Shudder, Shudder" "Hara Hara" (にゃーの 10 - はら はら)	September 13, 2001
The Byoh fighters have managed to find a portal to the human world, and they're after Taruto. Three mysterious mask-wearing Kinkas save her from harm. Taruto's friends now realize that those fairy tales about Ganache are actually real history, and they all chip in to help Taruto. However, the evil Byohs kidnap Kakipi and use him to force Taruto to come with them.
11	"Scary, Scary" "Doki Doki" (にゃーの 11 - どき どき)	September 20, 2001
Taruto's teacher Rakugan shows up to distract the Byohs so that Taruto and Kakipi can escape but he gets beat up by the baddies. Taruto then gets captured by Anzuko who has been grief-stricken over the recent loss of one of her pet cats. Iori sees that and convinces Anzuko that collecting cats is not the right way to fill the emptiness in her heart, what she really needs is love. On her way to the Castella Hall, Taruto gets ambushed and captured by the Byohs, while at the same time her cat friends as well as human friends all converge at the mansion for the final showdown.
12	"Happily, Happily ever after" "Medetashi Medetashi" (にゃーの 12 - めでたし めでたし)	September 27, 2001
The 3 Byoh baddies, Cyclo, Aspa, and Rutame, are finally defeated outside the Castella mansion after a fierce battle. It is then revealed that Taruto is indeed a Kinka princess, but she also has a younger twin sister Pie A La Mode, the 280th Queen of the Royal Matah Family. Because of her stronger magic ability and leadership skill, Pie was the one chosen as the Kinka queen to lead the fight against the Byohs in Ganache, therefore she could only pay occasional short visits to Taruto in the past. The Kinkas have just scored a major victory in Ganache so Pie must return there. She brings Madam Willow back with her and bids farewell to Taruto and her friends. Taruto gets to live happily ever after with Iori in the human world.
