= Yuriko Chiba =

Japanese animator (born 1967)

- 千羽 由利子
- Born: Kumamoto, Japan
- Occupations: Anime director and character designer

Yuriko Chiba (千羽 由利子, Chiba Yuriko; born March 9, 1967) is an animator and character designer. Some of her major character designs were for anime shows To Heart, Figure 17, Planetes, and Sacred Seven. In animation direction, she worked on I Dream of Mimi, Berserk, Code Geass, To Heart and Steel Angel Kurumi Zero.

== Works ==
List of works in anime
Year	Series	Crew role	Notes	Source
1997	"White Reflection" by Two-Mix	Character design, Animation director	Music video for theme song from Gundam Wing: Endless Waltz	
1997	I Dream of Mimi	Animation director	OVA	
1997	Berserk	Chief animation director		
1999	To Heart	Character design, Chief animation director		
2001	Steel Angel Kurumi Zero	Character design, Chief animation director		
2001–02	Figure 17	Character design		
2003–04	Planetes	Character design		
2006–07	Code Geass: Lelouch of the Rebellion	Main animator, Chief animation director		
2008	Code Geass: Lelouch of the Rebellion R2	Main animator, Chief animation director		
2010	Mobile Suit Gundam Unicorn	Animation director	OVA Ep. 1	
2011	Sacred Seven	Character design		
2012	Sacred Seven Special: Wings of Gingetsu	Character design		
2015	Maria the Virgin Witch	Character design	TV series	
