= Steel Angel Kurumi =

Manga

- Volume 1 DVD cover (English version)

鋼鉄天使くるみ (Kōtetsu Tenshi Kurumi)
- Genre: Action, comedy
- Manga
- Written by: Kaishaku
- Published by: Kadokawa Shoten
- English publisher: NA: ADV Manga; UK: ADV Manga
- Magazine: Monthly Ace Next; (1997–2002); Shōnen Ace; (2002–2003)
- Original run: October 3, 1997 – December 26, 2003
- Volumes: 11
- Anime television series
- Directed by: Naohito Takahashi
- Produced by: Shukichi Kanda
- Written by: Naruhisa Arakawa
- Music by: Toshihiko Sahashi
- Studio: OLM Team Wasaki
- Licensed by: AUS: Madman Entertainment; NA: ADV Films
- Original network: Wowow
- English network: NA: Anime Network
- Original run: October 5, 1999 – April 4, 2000
- Episodes: 24
- Original video animation

Steel Angel Kurumi Encore
- Directed by: Naohito Takahashi
- Produced by: Shukichi Kanda
- Written by: Naruhisa Arakawa
- Music by: Toshihiko Sahashi
- Studio: OLM Team Wasaki
- Licensed by: NA: ADV Films
- Released: January 7, 2000 – March 1, 2000
- Runtime: 15 minutes (per episode)
- Episodes: 4
- Anime television series

Steel Angel Kurumi 2
- Directed by: Naohito Takahashi
- Produced by: Kenji Kume
- Written by: Yōsuke Kuroda
- Music by: Toshihiko Sahashi
- Studio: OLM Team Wasaki
- Licensed by: AUS: Madman Entertainment; NA: ADV Films
- Original network: TV Kanagawa; Chiba TV; TV Saitama; SUN-TV
- English network: NA: Anime Network
- Original run: April 12, 2001 – June 28, 2001
- Episodes: 12
- Original video animation

Steel Angel Kurumi Zero
- Directed by: Naohito Takahashi
- Produced by: Kenji Kume
- Written by: Yōsuke Kuroda
- Music by: Toshihiko Sahashi
- Studio: OLM Team Wasaki
- Released: April 18, 2001 – June 20, 2001
- Runtime: 15 minutes per episode
- Episodes: 3
- Television drama

Steel Angel Kurumi Pure
- Directed by: Katsuya Korenaga
- Produced by: Masayoshi Ikeda
- Music by: Toshihiko Sahashi
- Original run: April 1, 2002 – September 10, 2002
- Episodes: 24
- icon

Steel Angel Kurumi (Japanese: 鋼鉄天使くるみ, Hepburn: Kōtetsu Tenshi Kurumi) is a Japanese manga series created by Kaishaku. An anime series adaptation directed by Naohito Takahashi, animated by Oriental Light and Magic, produced by Pony Canyon with character designs by Yuriko Chiba and Yūji Ikeda and music by Toshihiko Sahashi has been translated and released in North America by ADV Films. In 2008, Crunchyroll announced it had partnered with Pony Canyon to release the Steel Angel Kurumi series for streaming and download. The entire series was compiled in a Blu-ray box set by Pony Canyon on September 19, 2012.

The Kurumi series as a whole consists of the first season Steel Angel Kurumi, four OVA episodes entitled Steel Angel Kurumi Encore, a second season by the name of Steel Angel Kurumi 2, and a prequel OVA series entitled Steel Angel Kurumi 0. A live-action adaptation was made, titled Steel Angel Kurumi Pure, but has a different continuity to the anime. This series was originally aired in Japan as part of Wowow's Anime Complex.

The first anime series is set in an alternate history version of Japan during the Taishō period, while the second series takes place in the 21st century.

== Plot ==
Steel Angel Kurumi 1: Set during Japan's Taishō era, The story follows a young boy named Nakahito Kagura. He is pushed by a group of his classmates to go into a house that is rumored to belong to a mad scientist. While inside, he comes across in what seems to be a lifelike doll. At the same time, the Japanese Army carries out an attack on the house. During the attack the "doll" falls over and Nakahito accidentally kisses it, causing it to awaken. The doll turns out to be a Steel Angel called Kurumi, who is being hunted by the military for mysterious reasons.

Steel Angel Kurumi 2: Seventy-five years later, Nako Kagura is the great-granddaughter of the main protagonist from the previous series who is shown to be a high school student and an aspiring musician who also gets her chance to discover the existence of Kurumi and the Steel Angels. Unfortunately after Kurumi steals her first kiss, Nako's wealthy childhood friend Uruka Sumeragi becomes furious and upset; and does everything in her power (which including hiring her father's highly trained agents and powerful mecha-like robots) to defeat Kurumi and win back Nako's affection.

== Characters ==
=== First series ===
Nakahito Kagura (神維 仲人, Kagura Nakahito)
Voiced by: Houko Kuwashima (Japanese); Kira Vincent-Davis (English)
The primary male protagonist for the show, Nakahito unwittingly becomes the master of Steel Angel Kurumi when he accidentally awakens her with a kiss. Hesitant and unsure of himself, he teaches Kurumi as much as he can while slowly falling in love with the hyperactive girl. A mystic of the Onmyou (yin and yang) tradition, he has no observable powers. Much to his chagrin, his older brother Kamihito boasts great control of spiritual abilities. Although he has latent potential, as evidenced by his awakening of Kurumi, Nakahito's numerous attempts at honing his direct abilities end in failure. Clearly caught between manhood and boyhood, Nakahito seems unsure of how to handle the relentless attention of Kurumi and his other numerous one-sided love interests.
Kurumi (くるみ)
Voiced by: Atsuko Enomoto (Japanese); Kelli Cousins (English)
A Steel Angel built by Dr. Ayanokouji and equipped with a Mark II Heart, she is awakened by Nakahito's kiss in the first episode and immediately becomes possessive of him while simultaneously pledging her love and service to him. The main female lead and an incredibly wild individual, she is overwhelmingly manic when it comes to Nakahito, whom she calls "Master". She is very protective of her master and her sisters, she will stop at nothing to ensure their safety. She is impossibly strong and rather handily defeats all her opponents due to her Mark II Heart. Although she does her best to follow orders and help out the Kagura brothers, her clumsy and ditzy nature proves to be a significant stumbling block. She is the oldest of the Angel "sisters" and assumes a fairly typical "older sister" attitude when speaking with them. Kurumi has pink hair and wears a blue maid's outfit with red trim.
Saki (サキ)
Voiced by: Rie Tanaka (Japanese); Monica Rial (English)
Another Steel Angel built by Dr. Ayanokouji, Saki was activated by Dr. Amagi with Dr. Brandow's help, and given orders to destroy Kurumi and seize her Mark II Heart. Amagi and the General decide to use the largest of the seized Angel Hearts to give Saki as much power as possible. Saki and Kurumi fight, with the latter being defeated easily due to Nakahito's still-standing order to not fight. The victory is short-lived however, as Saki's improper activation causes her to collapse. Kurumi kisses Saki, and her Mark II Heart re-energizes Saki's Angel Heart. The action permanently activates Saki, and the master-servant relationship is reinstated, with Saki pledging her loyalty and love to Kurumi. Kurumi largely ignores this vow, but the two mutually call each other "sister" from then on. Saki is very quiet, the antithesis of Kurumi, and is quite lady-like in comparison. She is the kindest, and maybe the sweetest character in the show. She maintains wild fantasies about herself and Kurumi, but never speaks about them or properly expresses her love.
Karinka (カリンカ)
Voiced by: Masayo Kurata (Japanese); Hilary Haag (English)
The third Steel Angel built on the design by Dr. Ayanakouji, she was activated by the Academy to destroy Kurumi. She is very strong due to having two Angel Hearts installed instead of one; however, this also means she is exempted from following the orders of Dr. Walski, her creator. Karinka is infamous for kidnapping and nearly killing Saki. She is very temperamental, devious, and has occasionally shown traits of sadism. She later joins Nakahito and the group, originally to figure out Kurumi's power, but she eventually develops a crush on Nakahito. It was thanks to Nakahito that Karinka became friendly. Like her elder sisters, she does not care if Nakahito sees her naked.
Kamihito Kagura (神維 神人, Kagura Kamihito)
Voiced by: Yasunori Matsumoto (Japanese); David Matranga (English)
Nakahito's older brother. A well-trained and powerful mystic, he runs the shrine that Nakahito lives in and was originally sought to be the mystic to awaken Kurumi, but it doesn't turn out that way.
Tetsuo Ayanokouji (綾小路 鉄男, Ayanokōji Tetsuo)
Voiced by: Hirotaka Suzuoki (Japanese); Mike MacRae (English)
The scientist who built the three Steel Angels. He came to the area where Nakahito lives to find a mystic to activate Kurumi. He has connections with the mysterious Academy.
Reiko Amagi (天城 礼子, Amagi Reiko)
Voiced by: Ai Orikasa (Japanese); Shelley Calene-Black (English)
She is a scientist in her twenties who works with Dr. Ayanakouji in a military development project. She is first an antagonist of Nakahito and Kurumi, but quickly joins their side. She is in love with Dr. Ayanakouji.
The General (将軍)
Voiced by: Tamio Ōki (Japanese); John Swasey (English)
The head of the Japanese Army. He is in charge of the research projects for the military, and he has a crush on Karinka.
Dr. Walski (ワルスキー博士, Warusukī-hakase)
Voiced by: Tomomichi Nishimura (Japanese); Andy McAvin (English)
The head of the Academy, the scientist who activates Karinka and rival to Dr. Ayanakouji. He is the antagonist of the first series, although near the end of the series it is revealed his intentions are actually of just cause. His physical similarities to Brandow seem to be more than a coincidence; they may be related, but in the anime nothing of the sort is ever mentioned.
Dr. Brandow (ブランドー博士, Burandō-hakase)
Voiced by: Toshiyuki Morikawa (Japanese); Todd Waite (English)
Walski's aide who also does field work for the Academy. At first he is sent to work with Amagi to help activate Saki, who in turn is sent to destroy Kurumi, but after Saki fails, he attempts to take Kurumi himself. However, when he attempts to attack Kurumi, he misses and hits Ayanakouji, who he then captures and takes to the Academy.
Yoshino Koganei (小金井 佳乃, Koganei Yoshino) and
Koganei Voiced by: Michiko Neya (Japanese); Christine Auten (English)
One of two junior Army Intelligence officers sent by the General to watch over and covertly aid the Steel Angels, with a crush on Nakahito.
Eiko Kichijoji (吉祥寺 栄子, Kichijōji Eiko)
Kichijoji Voiced by: Tomoko Kawakami (Japanese); Emily Carter (English)
One of two junior Army Intelligence officers sent by the General to watch over and covertly aid the Steel Angels, with a crush on Dr. Amagi.
Diana (ダイアナ)
A steel angel created before Kurumi, whom had accompanied Dr. Ayanokouji.
Tsunami (ツナミ)
Voiced by: Ryoka Yuzuki (Japanese); Tiffany Grant (English)
Kaga (加賀, Kaga)
Voiced by: Chiharu Tezuka (Japanese); Kaytha Coker (English)
Kaori (カオリ, Kaori)
Voiced by: Akemi Okamura (Japanese); Shantel VanSanten (English)
Excelia (優秀（エクセリア）, Ekuseruia)
Voiced by: Omi Minami
A steel angel from the 100th year of Taisho.
Mikhail (ミハエル, Mikharu)
Voiced by: Yumi Touma (Japanese); Claudia Black, Greg Ayres (young) (English)

=== Second series ===
Nako Kagura (神維 那己, Kagura Nako)
Voiced by: Houko Kuwashima (Japanese); Luci Christian (English)
Great granddaughter of Nakahito, Nako is a bespectacled soft-spoken, shy, and clumsy 9th grade student at an all-girls school called Momonoki Academy. She lives at the old Kagura shrine with her single mother, Misaki (which proves even further that dark blue hair just runs in the family), and lives next door to her very rich neighbor and best friend, Uruka. Nako is also a very skilled cellist, and may prove to one day be famous. The day she found Kurumi was the day she gave her first kiss, and from then on was the new master of Steel Angel Kurumi. Now being the receiver of the same affection that was given to her great ancestor Nakahito, Nako is constantly chased and protected by Kurumi.
Kurumi (くるみ弐式, Kurumi Mark II)/Koutetsu Kurumi (鋼鉄くるみ, Kurumi Kotetsu)
Voiced by: Atsuko Enomoto (Japanese); Kelli Cousins (English)
A Steel Angel built by Dr. Ayanokouji and equipped with a Mark II Heart, she is reawakened by Nako's kiss in the first episode and gives the same affection to Nako that was given to her last master Nakahito.
Uruka Sumeragi (皇 うるか, Sumeragi Uruka)
Voiced by: Mie Sonozaki (Japanese); Rozie Curtis (English)
A tenth grade high school student at Momonoki Academy and the best friend of Nako until Kurumi came along. Uruka is in love with Nako, and had originally hoped to be the one to take Nako's first kiss. On the day that Kurumi appeared, she was the first witness to see the fateful kiss, to which she could not get over for an entire day. Uruka now sees Kurumi as an obstacle to Nako and will try anything to remove Kurumi, even if it means asking her father to call upon the family's private army to take her down. When they find that Saki is a Steel Angel, the family army decides to use her as a weapon against Kurumi, the "source of Uruka-chan's unhappiness." On the day that Saki was to be awakened, Uruka was there to supervise the process, but got involved in a fantasy of her own, involving Nako, and ended up kissing Saki. Saki then falls in love with her new master, and Uruka wants nothing to do with her.
Kyanwan
Voiced by: Rikako Aikawa
The first animal Steel Angel, Kyanwan is Kurumi's pet dog that has the ability to transform into a jet, which then transforms into mechanical wings for Kurumi, or also into fins for speed underwater. Part cute "magical girl" pet and useful plot device, Kyanwan generally remains by Kurumi's side unless he is with Nako's mother.
Tenkai Sumeragi (皇 天海, Sumeragi Tenkai)
Voiced by: Unshou Ishizuka (Japanese); Tommy Drake (English)
Uruka's wealthy, loving father. He owns an entire collection of mecha robots and gear that his daughter Uruka uses to destroy Kurumi.
Saki, Mark II (サキ弐式)/Koutetsu Saki (鋼鉄サキ, Saki Kotetsu)
Uruka Sumeragi's father slammed his fist on his table and his statue crumbled to pieces, revealing Saki in the statue. She was activated by a kiss of Uruka Sumeragi. She is in love with both Kurumi and Uruka.
Karinka, Mark II (カリンカ弐式)
Although not a new character, she does get a character design makeover. Losing the "flight attendant leotard" look that she had in the first series, she now has curly pigtails and pants. Again history repeats itself in her introduction, and just like last time, her awakening was not by a kiss. Having no master, she runs off of the program that Steel Angels are to protect humanity, not fall in love and become servants to them. Karinka Mark II's upgrades include built-in flight ability and increased tactical battle data. Again, history repeats when Karinka kidnaps Saki, fights Kurumi, and loses after finding that Kurumi has more strength and will to fight because of love, specifically Nako. And all over again, Karinka gets a crush on whomever Kurumi loves, and Nako becomes victim to another suitor.
Misaki Kagura (神維 美咲, Kagura Misaki)
Voiced by: Kotono Mitsuishi (Japanese); Allison Keith (English)
Nako's eccentric single mother, who allow's Kurumi to live in her household.
Yutaka Kizuki (杵築 豊, Kizuki Yutaka)
Voiced by: Susumu Chiba (Japanese); Jay Hickman (English)
Nako's music teacher.

== Media ==
=== Manga ===
The manga was being produced first. However, it is significantly different from the anime. In the manga, Nakahito discovers Kurumi in the same fashion, he was being bullied and fell into Dr. Ayanoukoji's lab.

The academy travels back in time to find the world's greatest mystic. To do that, they give each nation the ability to design its own steel angel. They then hold a Steel Fight to see who the strongest mystic is. During the Steel Fight, all steel angels are shut down because of a revolt, and a demon exits her fake steel angel body. She places a curse on Nakahito and travels into the future. The crew also goes into the future to destroy the demon and remove the curse. They live with Dr. Amagi's granddaughter.

=== Anime ===
==== Steel Angel Kurumi ====
A 24-episode anime television series was animated by Oriental Light and Magic and directed by Naohito Takahashi. The anime aired in Japan on Wowow between October 5, 1999, and April 4, 2000.

==== Steel Angel Kurumi Encore ====
Four additional OVA short stories of the Steel Angels: Saki becomes a film actress, Karinka goes on a blind date with Kamihito, Kurumi practices the art of becoming a traditional Japanese woman, and the rest of the Steel Angels engage in a contest to win Nakahito's heart.

==== Steel Angel Kurumi 2 ====
An alternate story of the Steel Angel Kurumi series set in the early 21st century. Bringing back the feeling of love polygons, the twist in this 12-episode continuation is that almost all of the characters are female, bringing a Yuri element to the story.

The story takes place back at the Kagura Shrine, in AD 200X, about 4 generations after Nakahito Kagura. One day, Nako Kagura and her best friend Uruka get lost in the shrine's basement labyrinth (formerly a bomb shelter) and run across a dog and a giant, scary, flying statue. As Nako and Uruka run away from the scary flying statue, Nako trips and is caught by the statue, which covers her in a divine light. She is then given a message by Dr. Ayanakouji through the statue, the statue then breaks apart and out falls Kurumi, right onto Nako's lips. Again, the events come full circle, and Kurumi awakens from a new master's kiss.

==== Steel Angel Kurumi Zero ====
This OVA story takes place in the distant future in which Kurumi, Saki, and Karinka all live inside of an apartment together along with their landlady Excelia. The 3 episode OVA which aired in the midst of the second series, takes place mainly inside of the apartment as Kurumi comes home to the apartment from school to notify her house mates that she has met a boy at school whom she has fallen in love with.

The story then proceeds from there as Kurumi handles her depression and loneliness after the boy she is in love with moves away from her, and then finds out that he is dying. In every episode, the feelings within Kurumi causes a glowing angel to appear before her, and later, in front of the others.

This series has a much darker story, with no comedy or action elements as evident in the other series. The color palette is very limited except for the characters who still keep their colorful, bright hair.

=== Live-action series ===
Steel Angel Kurumi Pure (鋼鉄天使くるみpure) is a 24 episode Japanese television drama produced in 2002. The story is set the 21st century where the rapid evolution of robot technology makes it possible to use them as nurses in hospitals. These new robots are then referred to as 'kangoroids'. Ayanokouji Corporation is the leading company in this area. They are developing new kangoroids for home use, which has the code name 'Steel Angel'. When the 1st prototype named Kurumi is completed, they choose one boy as its monitor. The boy is Nakahito Kagura, a nephew of the president of Ayanokouji Corporation. He is a junior high student but he has contained himself in his room after an incident and refuses to leave. He soon receives a package in the mail that contains the prototype Kurumi kangoroid. While he's embarrassed with Kurumi at first, her devotion slowly makes him accept her.

== Reception ==
In a review at Anime News Network, Zac Bertschy commented that "The storyline is mostly forgettable", however he added that "The animation is smooth and polished, moreso than other series in this vein. The music, especially the catchy opening theme song, is surprisingly well-done and pleasant to listen to."

Chris Beveridge from Mania gave Steel Angel Kurumi 2 a B and noted that "It's a sequel that, while it's not the best thing in the world, it doesn’t actively harm your thoughts on the first series."

Steel Angel Kurumi is rated 6.7/10 on IMDb based on 197 user reviews (as of July 2024).
