= List of Lucky Star episodes =

This is an episode listing for the anime adaptation of Lucky Star. The anime, containing twenty-four episodes, aired between April 8, 2007, and September 16, 2007, on Chiba TV and is produced by the animation company Kyoto Animation. The series was directed by Japanese animation director Yutaka Yamamoto for the first four episodes, but he was fired and replaced by Yasuhiro Takemoto from episode five on. An original video animation episode was produced following the series and was released on September 26, 2008. An anime adaptation of Miyakawa-ke no Kūfuku, produced by Ordet and Encourage Films, began streaming on Ustream on April 29, 2013.

The opening theme is "Take It! Sailor Uniform" (もってけ!セーラーふく, Motteke! Sērāfuku) by Konata Izumi (Aya Hirano), Kagami Hiiragi (Emiri Katō), Tsukasa Hiiragi (Kaori Fukuhara), and Miyuki Takara (Aya Endo). Lucky Star does not have one consistent ending theme, a new theme is used in each episode; most of them are of theme songs from other anime and from tokusatsu television shows. Each ending theme in episodes one through twelve is performed as a karaoke by one of the principal characters. From episode thirteen onwards, each ending theme is performed by Minoru Shiraishi (Portrayed by Minoru Shiraishi), singing and acting in live action (the exception to this being episode sixteen, which shows a music video excerpt of "Misoji Misaki" by Akira Kogami (Portrayed by Hiromi Konno)).

== Lucky Star (2007) ==
No.	Title	Ending theme	Insert song	Original release date
1	"The Girl who Dashes Off"; Transliteration: "Tsuppashiru Onna" (Japanese: つっぱしる女)	"Space Ironman Kyodain" (宇宙鉄人キョーダイン, Uchū Tetsujin Kyōdain) by Konata Izumi (Aya Hirano)	N/A	April 8, 2007
The four main characters are introduced, going about everyday life, as they attend their second year at Ryōō High School. The first discussion of chocolate cornet begins. One of Konata's friends, Kagami Hiiragi, is sick, and her friends come over to see how she is doing. In Lucky Channel, Akira Kogami and Minoru Shiraishi are introduced, with Akira questioning her cheap pay, even though she is an idol.
2	"Efforts and Results"; Transliteration: "Doryoku to Kekka" (Japanese: 努力と結果)	"Victory! Akumaizer 3" (勝利だ!アクマイザー3, Shōri da! Akumaizā 3) by Konata Izumi (Aya Hirano)	"Hare Hare Yukai" by Haruhi Suzumiya (Aya Hirano), Yuki Nagato (Minori Chihara), and Mikuru Asahina (Yuko Goto)	April 15, 2007
Throughout Golden Week, Kagami and Tsukasa have been playing together, however, Tsukasa does not know her sister has actually been waking up earlier and going to bed later, in order to study and finish homework. After the break, Konata pulls an all-nighter and manages to obtain an above-average score, despite doing no studying during the short vacation. To fund her otaku desires, Konata decides to get a part-time job, with the position greatly surprising her friends and it suits her perfectly. In Lucky Channel, Akira is upset since Minoru gets to appear in the actual show. She then goes on to help Minoru practice his lines right there on the set.
3	"Various People"; Transliteration: "Iroiro na Hitotachi" (Japanese: いろいろな人たち)	"Isn't That Love?" (それが、愛でしょう, Sore ga, Ai deshō) by Konata Izumi (Aya Hirano)	N/A	April 22, 2007
The girls discuss various facts and myths about twins, and how, according to changes in classification, Kagami and Tsukasa might be identical, instead of fraternal. Then, Konata, Tsukasa and Miyuki compare notes on marriage. Later, when Konata, Tsukasa, and Kagami are hanging out together, they each pull their hair into a ponytail to see how it would look. In Lucky Channel, Minoru re-introduces Miyuki Takara. After a short list of Miyuki's good attributes, Akira gets more than a little jealous of her attractiveness.
4	"A Question of Motivation"; Transliteration: "Yaruki no Mondai" (Japanese: やる気の問題)	"Sailor Suit and Machine Gun" (セーラー服と機関銃, Sērā Fuku to Kikanjū) by Kagami Hiiragi (Emiri Katō)	"Hare Hare Yukai" by Haruhi Suzumiya (Aya Hirano), Yuki Nagato (Minori Chihara), and Mikuru Asahina (Yuko Goto)	April 29, 2007
Summer vacation is almost here, and Konata is still staying up late playing online video games, reading manga, and watching anime, instead of studying. It is revealed that her homeroom teacher, Nanako Kuroi, plays the same game as Konata. Kagami and Tsukasa's birthday is around the corner, and Konata and Miyuki celebrate with them. Konata reveals to the sisters how she came to like manga and anime. In Lucky Channel, Akira thanks the viewers for their interest in "Akira Fashion Project". She then grumbles about men's interest in girls with long hair.
5	"The Famous Shooter"; Transliteration: "Meishashu" (Japanese: 名射手)	"Cha-La Head-Cha-La" by Konata Izumi (Aya Hirano)	N/A	May 6, 2007
Summer vacation begins, and Konata, the Hiiragi twins and Miyuki go to a summer festival, dressed in yukata. Yui Narumi, Konata's cousin, is introduced, currently on patrol at the festival. Konata and Nanako chat over an MMORPG, and later, Konata and the twins meet to do homework together. Back at her house, Konata finds a rare item drop on the game and celebrates it with her online friends. In Lucky Channel, Akira shares her insights on online games and how it was when she was younger.
6	"Fixtures of Summer"; Transliteration: "Natsu no Teiban" (Japanese: 夏の定番)	"Valentine Kiss" (バレンタイン・キッス, Barentain Kissu) by Tsukasa Hiiragi (Kaori Fukuhara) and Konata Izumi (Aya Hirano)	"Gravity" by Satoru Kōsaki & m.o.e.v	May 13, 2007
The group, plus Yui and Nanako, go to the beach for some summer fun. After Yui races down the road (in a parody of Initial D), and Nanako gets really lost, they finally make it and spend a night in a Japanese inn. After a day at the beach, and Nanako becoming too drunk to drive, they head back to the inn for a shower and to spend another night. After arriving home, the twins have to clean their bedrooms, Konata discusses cleaning tactics with Kagami, and Miyuki is told she has to go see the dentist, or her mom is bringing the dentist to their home. In Lucky Channel, Akira threatens Minoru and shows her (censored) middle finger to the viewers. Konata Izumi is re-introduced here. Akira later complains about the fans who come to her concerts and grumbles about the life of an idol.
7	"Image"; Transliteration: "Imēji" (Japanese: イメージ)	"Earthly Stars" (地上の星, Chijō no Hoshi) by Miyuki Takara (Aya Endo)	"Kuchibiru Daydream" by Aki Misato	May 20, 2007
The girls return to school after summer vacation and find that Konata is under the influence of Marimite. Tsukasa and Miyuki have a conversation about the dentist and return trips to said dentist. Konata refers to Minoru as "Sebastion" because he was acting like a butler by collecting homework for Ms. Kuroi. Konata also finds out from Tsukasa that Kagami takes liberal arts just to be in the same class with everyone else and Konata makes fun of her for it. Yui comes to visit and Konata needs help with her summer homework but she would probably have to redo it over again if she gets help from Yui. Miyuki attends school for a day without her glasses and Tsukasa gets a new cell phone, but it dies after a trip in the washing machine. Konata's dad is also trying to call her, but she has left her phone in her room. They get on the topic of what side the head would be on a cornet again and how Kagami was not pleased with the results of the diet she went on to make up for the weight she gained in the summer. Konata and the Hiiragi twins are on a bus and Kagami talks about how there has been frequent junk mail lately and Konata explains that she uses an address that is hard to guess. She uses an address called "iluvgirlswithglasses" and this creates an awkward moment for everyone on the bus. In Lucky Channel, Minoru follows up on a fan's request for a certain hairstyle involving sunflowers. Akira is sulky right from the start and continues in her bad mood, until near the end of the section.
8	"Energetic Despite Not Being Myself"; Transliteration: "Watashi ja Nakute mo Ōsei" (Japanese: 私じゃなくても旺盛)	"Monkey Magic" by Konata Izumi (Aya Hirano)	N/A	May 27, 2007
It's time for the athletic festival, and Konata's father is more than ready with his cameras. Kagami is in an eating contest, Konata is in the one-hundred meter dash, Tsukasa has to jump over hurdles, and Miyuki is in a relay race, where she brings the team from third to win the race by using her physical assets. Later, Tsukasa is trying to learn a song on the recorder, and doing horribly, until Kagami teaches her not to blow so hard into it. Later, the girls line up for lunch in the school cafeteria, having various conversations. Afterwards, Konata is at a bookstore and trying to decide which manga to buy. She ultimately selects volume five of Shuffle! only to realize that she already owns a copy of that manga to begin with. In Lucky Channel, Akira makes fun of Minoru for being just an assistant, thus unable to gather as many fans as her; she is rudely awakened when she realizes that this time around, he was the only one of the two who has fan mail. Akira represents the team in inviting viewers to vote for the character they want to be made into a live figure.
9	"That Feeling"; Transliteration: "Sonna Kankaku" (Japanese: そんな感覚)	"Kogarashi ni Dakarete" (木枯らしに抱かれて, Embraced by the Wintry Wind) by Konata Izumi (Aya Hirano)	N/A	June 3, 2007
Mid-term exams are arriving, though Konata cannot seem to get into the practice of studying, and instead, reverts to slacking off, while having fun playing games. Konata tries to ask her friends about good study habits, but in the end, she does bad on her tests. When the girls get to school, they talk about what blood type they have and what type of games they play. Tsukasa got help from her sister and this time got better scores, but Kagami's scores were still higher, despite her own scores going down somewhat. Later, Konata and the Hiiragi twins go see a movie and they also go to a cake café, but end up taking too much and must finish it all or pay extra. Miyuki needs to put in her eye drops, but she flinches too much and gets Konata to "help" her. In Lucky Channel, Minoru re-introduces Tsukasa Hiiragi, whom Akira compared to Kamigishi Akari. When Minoru admits that Tsukasa has some idol qualities, Akira hits him in the head with an ashtray. She then goes on to teach Minoru how to have his pictures taken like a true idol.
10	"Desires"; Transliteration: "Ganbō" (Japanese: 願望)	"I'm Proud" by Kagami Hiiragi (Emiri Katō)	"Pair of Mojipittan" (ふたりのもじぴったん, Futari no Mojipittan) by Nana Furuhara	June 10, 2007
Tsukasa gets a new cell phone and learns how to text message from her sister. Tsukasa loves to text message so much that she spams Kagami's cell phone with an excessive number of messages to the point of annoyance. Yui comes to visit Konata but doesn't realize that Konata is playing an age restricted game. Konata and Kagami both go to an anime shop where four stereotypical anime characters are introduced who name Konata "Legendary Girl A", thus, being the first appearance of Meito Anizawa. Later, the Hiiragi twins spend the night at Konata's house and finally get a chance to meet her father. They also discover how much Konata resembles her late mother, Kanata Izumi, while perusing a photo album. At school, Konata tries to come up with some new nicknames and after a suggestion from Kagami, starts calling her Kagami-sama, which greatly embarrasses Kagami. In Lucky Channel, Akira re-introduces Kagami Hiiragi and thinks of her as a tsundere. Minoru strongly disagrees and explains the original definition of tsundere. Akira asks Minoru for a better term to describe Kagami. Unable to come up with one, Minoru wants the home viewers to do that instead, leading him into a long and enthusiastic speech that, at the end of the shoot, he is very proud of.
11	"Various Ways to Spend Christmas Eve"; Transliteration: "Ironna Seiya no Sugoshikata" (Japanese: いろんな聖夜の過ごし方)	"Doraemon's Song" (ドラえもんのうた, Doraemon no Uta) by Tsukasa Hiiragi (Kaori Fukuhara) and Miyuki Hiiragi (Aya Endo)	N/A	June 17, 2007
The end of the year is drawing close, and that means Christmas is right around the corner. They get on the topic of how sometimes when they get sleepy on a bus, they sometimes tend to lean on the person next to them. Whenever Konata gets on her bus, she gets sleepy and falls asleep a few times on the shoulder of the person next to her. She realizes that she got off the stop before, but whenever she tries to go back to her seat, someone took it and Konata is forced to stand up. At school, Kagami is annoyed that she didn't get much studying done, but Konata is proud about how many hours she studied. Whenever Miyuki asks how many hours they studied, it turns out that both studied for four hours. Tsukasa talks with Konata and Miyuki on when they stopped believing in Santa Claus, and gets vastly different responses. Kagami notices that she goes to Tsukasa's class a little too much and Miyuki and Tsukasa talk about dentist and cavities again. Yui visits Konata and they discuss about a detective show. The girls also talk about how a Christmas cake can seem like a regular cake after the age of twenty-five. Before the winter break from school begins, Konata and her friends must go through a round of final exams, though Konata does not fare as well as she would have liked. She takes a look at Miyuki's grades and is jealous of losing, not of her grades, but her bust size. Nanako purchases a Christmas cake and Konata and Kagami visit the anime shop again. On Christmas Eve, Konata's dad is upset whenever Konata is late to coming home, but is suddenly overcome by joy whenever she brings him a present. Yui comes to visit them drunk but is excited that her husband was waiting for her at her house. Konata logs onto her online game to find her teacher already on. The next morning, the girls discuss about static electricity by touching the door handles and Konata's dad is having fun shocking himself at home. In Lucky Channel, Akira announces that she will appear in the next episode of Lucky Star.
12	"Let's Go to the Festival"; Transliteration: "O-matsuri e Ikō" (Japanese: お祭りへ行こう)	"Go! Godman" (行け!ゴッドマン, Ike! Goddoman) by Konata Izumi (Aya Hirano) "Makenaide" (負けないで) by Kagami Hiiragi (Emiri Katō)	N/A	June 24, 2007
Konata, Kagami, and Tsukasa go to Comiket 71, at the end of 2006. While Kagami can bear the massive event, Tsukasa can't take too much, being a first-timer, and is eventually unable to get what Konata asked her to pick up. Meanwhile, it appears that Akira Kogami makes an appearance, as declared in the previous episode's Lucky Channel. However, it turns out to be just a cardboard cut-out of her with a message stating that Akira cannot attend because of sudden illness. After the morning trip around Comiket, Konata meets Tsukasa and Kagami at a New Year festival and receives very bad luck in a lottery drawing. At home, Konata goes out of her way to be nice to her dad in order to receive her otoshidama. She logs into her game to wish others a happy new year only to once again encounter her teacher online. In Lucky Channel, Minoru is the one doing the intro. Akira is still present, but she is wearing a mask over her mouth. Minoru explains that Akira suddenly fell ill and therefore could not appear in episode twelve of Lucky Star.
13	"Delicious Day"; Transliteration: "Oishii Hi" (Japanese: おいしい日)	"My Forgotten Thing" (俺の忘れ物, Ore no Wasuremono) by Minoru Shiraishi (Minoru Shiraishi)	N/A	July 1, 2007
The Japanese New Year is coming up and everyone is excited. Kagami, however, is once again worrying about her weight having increased again. She spills the fact that she likes eating mochi and Konata jokes that gorging on it has caused Kagami's weight gain. Miyuki explains that eating a rice cake that is as big as a matchbox is the same as eating a whole bowl of rice. The girls discuss various traditions, foods, and myths about New Year's, and which ones they actually practice. Valentine's Day also approaches, and the girls find themselves only sharing chocolates between themselves, as they don't have any boys to give them to. The girls also talk at length about kotatsu. Later, at a cafe, Konata announces that her younger cousin, Yutaka Kobayakawa, will be coming to live with her. Konata goes to the anime shop again where the dynamic comic book characters (led by returning character Meito Anizawa) yet again try to make a sale from her but fail, ultimately because she was 3 yen short of the price of the DVD they were about to sell her. In Lucky Channel, Akira appears with the twin drills she had mentioned in episode seven. Also, Minoru has the voting results for the figurine project mentioned in episode 8, and he wants Akira to announce them. She reluctantly agrees and finds out that there will be figurines of Konata Izumi and (much to Akira's disgust) Minoru Shiraishi.
14	"Under One Roof"; Transliteration: "Hitotsu Yane no Shita" (Japanese: ひとつ屋根の下)	"Hare Hare Yukai" (ハレ晴レユカイ, Hare Hare Yukai) by Minoru Shiraishi (Portrayed by Minoru Shiraishi)	N/A	July 8, 2007
In expectation of being accepted to Ryōō High School, Yutaka moves to Konata's house. Yutaka is very nervous about the entrance exams, but a strange girl helps her calm down. They meet again at the school and find they were both accepted. Kagami complains about how annoying cram school calls can be and Miyuki explains that you can use caller ID to spot the calls. Kagami goes home and realizes that she does not have caller ID. When and Miyuki comes home, she finds her mom having a lively conversation with someone on the phone, only to find out it was a telemarketer. Konata and the Hiiragi twins are back at the anime shop and Konata is upset because there is a new item available, but she does not have enough points to get it because she bought something else the other day. Konata and the twins also go to a restaurant and discuss why restrooms are usually located near the smoking section. Konata, her dad, and Yutaka watch the news about elementary children being targeted. The Hiiragi twins come over and discuss uniforms and traditions—such as the practice of getting something from the person you like—at their old schools with Konata and Yutaka. Yui comes over and wants to party, but the girls are under age for the things she wanted to do. Later, Konata calls Kagami to sympathize with her about the pressures of being a big sister, and notes that her cousin, Yui, doesn't set a good example for her at all. In Lucky Channel, Akira complains about recording only one line for the show, and she was not even shown. She tries to get the audience to help her get a bigger part. Minoru is told by the producer to stop Akira because time is almost up, but Akira ends up yelling at Minoru.
15	"I Can't Suddenly Change"; Transliteration: "Ikinari wa Kawarenai" (Japanese: いきなりは変われない)	"The Minoru Legend of Love" (恋のミノル伝説, Koi no Minoru Densetsu) by Minoru Shiraishi (Portrayed by Minoru Shiraishi)	"God knows…" by Haruhi Suzumiya (Aya Hirano) "Love Dream of the Future Where the Sakura Bloom" (サクラサクミライコイユメ, Sakura Saku Mirai Koi Yume) by yozuca* "Myth that revives" (蘇る神話, Yomigaeru Shinwa) by Kate "Loreley" (ローレライ) by Philipp Friedrich Silcher	July 15, 2007
Konata, Kagami, Tsukasa, and Miyuki go to a live concert event, The Extravagance of Haruhi Suzumiya, which leaves Konata amazed by the Japanese voice of Haruhi and Konata, Aya Hirano's performance. When April Fool's Day comes around, Konata calls Kagami and tells her that she is done with her homework, and Kagami falls for it. Nanako later calls her and tells Konata she accidentally wrote over one of Konata's save files in one of her games, which makes Konata lie to Nanako about Miyuki, after falling for the April Fool's joke. When the new school year begins, Konata, Tsukasa, and Miyuki are put into the same class again, while Kagami is put into a separate class. Yutaka is in the same class as Minami, and is starting to become good friends with her. In Lucky Channel, Akira manages to scare Minoru by telling him that this was his final appearance before revealing that it was nothing more than an April Fool's joke. Akira then begins complaining as to how Minoru appeared as the MC at The Extravagance of Haruhi Suzumiya in the actual episode, and how she has not had a concert of her own for a while, before discovering through Minoru that the producer has actually booked a concert for her next week. Akira is ecstatic at this news.
16	"Ring"; Transliteration: "Ringu" (Japanese: リング)	"The Cape of Age Thirty" (三十路岬, Misoji Misaki) by Akira Kogami (Portrayed by Hiromi Konno)	"Hare Hare Yukai" by Haruhi Suzumiya (Aya Hirano), Yuki Nagato (Minori Chihara), and Mikuru Asahina (Yuko Goto) "The Mikuru Legend of Love" (恋のミクル伝説, Koi no Mikuru Densetsu) by Mikuru Asahina (Yuko Goto)	July 22, 2007
Konata shows off her new cell phone, which can play songs as ringtones; she reveals her ringtone to be "The Mikuru Legend of Love". At school, Miyuki talks about how she and her mother can sometimes be forgetful of things and how much time they spent together. Kagami, Tsukasa, and Miyuki are invited to the cosplay café Konata works at, but on the way they were asked to buy a comic magazine and a new Code Geass dōjinshi. Men outside of the comic store start to take pictures of Tsukasa because she looks like Akari Kamigishi from ToHeart, but Kagami intervenes and pulls Tsukasa into the store. When they arrive at the café, Konata is cosplaying as Haruhi Suzumiya from The Melancholy of Haruhi Suzumiya and there are two other employees dressed as Mikuru Asahina (Patricia Martin) and Yuki Nagato, along with a customer resembling Kyon. Konata and the two dressed as Yuki and Mikuru do the dance sequence to the song "Hare Hare Yukai", Tsukasa and Miyuki were impressed, Kagami was not for the most part, but smiled a bit after it was over. The employees speak like the characters they are cosplaying when they serve; Konata speaks like Haruhi and imitates her exact voice (being that the voice actresses of Haruhi and Konata in both the English and Japanese versions of the series are the same). In Lucky Channel, it turns out that the concert talked about in the previous episode turns out be nothing more than a karaoke performance. Akira is quite angered at this, but still sings regardless. The show ends before Akira can finish her song, but the song continues into the credits.
17	"Base of the Sun"; Transliteration: "O-tento-sama no Moto" (Japanese: お天道様のもと)	"Take It! Sailor Uniform (Vague Sunshine ver.)" (もってけ!セーラーふく (曖昧サンシャインver.), Motteke! Sērāfuku (Aimai Sanshain ver.)) by Minoru Shiraishi (Portrayed by Minoru Shiraishi)	N/A	July 29, 2007
It is Konata's birthday and she is happy to be a legal adult, because she can play adult-only games legally now. Later, Konata's family decides to have a surprise party for her, but their plans end up failing, due to Konata's co-workers also celebrating her birthday. Kagami forgets to buy groceries for dinner which angers her older sister, Matsuri. Kagami walks off in a huff to go to the store and Tsukasa comes to her aid with a shopping list. Upon returning home, they find their older sisters worried about them and Kagami cheers up when her sister shows appreciation for gathering the ingredients. In Lucky Channel, Meito Anizawa appears as a guest and proceeds to take control of the show with his overly-dramatic complaints about how nobody values the hard work taken to produce anime.
18	"To Each Her Own"; Transliteration: "Jūnintoiro" (Japanese: 十人十色)	"Kaorin's Theme" (かおりんのテーマ, Kaorin no Tēma) by Minoru Shiraishi (Portrayed by Minoru Shiraishi)	N/A	August 5, 2007
Konata has a conversation with Miyuki and finds out her eyesight is about 20/200, meaning she has very bad eyes. Miyuki reveals a myriad of things that can improve eyesight, but she has never tried any of them. Kagami continues to try to make Konata read light novels, which greatly annoys her. Later, Kagami gets on Konata's case about how she never uses her cell phone, and is only wasting money on the monthly access fee. Hiyori invites Yutaka, Minami, and Patricia to her house, and while Hiyori goes to get drinks, Patricia finds Hiyori's sketchbook, greatly embarrassing her, especially when she gets to the recent sketches of Minami and Yutaka together in a yuri pairing. In Lucky Channel, the six remaining Lucky Star girls are all introduced. Akira is appalled that with all these new girls making debuts, she hasn't managed to make an appearance in the show yet, and continues to complain as Shiraishi squeezes in a text message to his mom.
19	"There is Substance in 2-D"; Transliteration: "Niji ni Honshitsu Ari" (Japanese: 二次に本質あり)	"A Man's Way of Life" (男の生き様, Otoko no Ikizama) by Minoru Shiraishi (Portrayed by Minoru Shiraishi)	N/A	August 12, 2007
Konata and her father have a discussion on how well the Gundam franchise has done, and how the series is still very popular, despite its age. Konata's father recounts when he watched them when some of the older series first came out. At school, Nanako gets depressed, after seeing her students go to Miyuki for help, instead of herself. After finding out that Hiyori draws dōjinshi, Yutaka asks her what kind, but Hiyori keeps it vague, finding it hard to tell her the truth. While Yutaka, Minami, and Hiyori are out together, Hiyori spots two people cosplaying as Roy Mustang and Edward Elric from Fullmetal Alchemist, though only Hiyori notices this as she spans photos on her cell phone. In Lucky Channel, just to get rid of him, Akira sends Shiraishi on a wilderness trip to Mount Fuji to obtain some water coming from a stream there for her.
20	"Ways to Spend Summer"; Transliteration: "Natsu no Sugoshikata" (Japanese: 夏の過ごし方)	"Bridegroom Rumba" (お婿ルンバ, Omuko Runba) by Minoru Shiraishi (Portrayed by Minoru Shiraishi)	N/A	August 19, 2007
Kagami and Konata talk about collectible figures, the negative portrayal of Akihabara in the media and the relationships between otaku. Konata is reluctant to do any homework and is caught playing games and reading manga, instead of working several times by Yui. Konata, Miyuki, Tsukasa and Kagami get together to study during the summer and decide to go to a fireworks festival near Miyuki's house. Yutaka, Minami, Hiyori and Patricia decide to go to the same festival and discover that Minami and Miyuki live across the street from each other. In Lucky Channel Minoru has been replaced as Akira's assistant by Daisuke Ono (Daisuke Ono / Johnny Yong Bosch), and some references are made to both voice actors' appearances in Air — Ono as the crow, Sora, and Akira (Hiromi Konno / Stephanie Sheh) as the dog, Potato. They turn to live footage of Fuji Forest in order to check up on how Shiraishi is doing, but he is nowhere to be seen.
21	"Pandora's Box"; Transliteration: "Pandora no Hako" (Japanese: パンドラの箱)	"Shikaider's Song" (シカイダーの唄, Shikaidā no Uta) by Minoru Shiraishi (Portrayed by Minoru Shiraishi)	TBA	August 26, 2007
The third-years go on a trip to Kyoto. Tsukasa feeds deer, however, she eventually gets trampled by them. Kagami receives a letter from a boy asking her to come out at night; she thinks it is a love letter, thus thinks about it all day, not even saying stuff against Konata's childish jokes. However, it turns out that the boy called Kagami in order to get a doll that he was too embarrassed to buy. The next day, Konata leads the girls on a side trip to the offices of Kyoto Animation. In Lucky Channel, Minoru returns with water from Mount Fuji. Akira drinks the water, but spits it out and throws the bottle at him, because she hates how the water is warm. Minoru finally loses it, ranting about how tough his life is on the show, and ruins the studio with his anger.
22	"The Yonder Here"; Transliteration: "Koko ni Aru Kanata" (Japanese: ここにある彼方)	"My Dear Santa Monica" (我が愛しのサンタモニカ, Waga Itoshi no Santa Monica) by Minoru Shiraishi (Portrayed by Minoru Shiraishi); Rotates between ending theme songs of episodes 13, 14, 15, 17, 19, and 21.	"Pair of Mojipittan" (ふたりのもじぴったん, Futari no Mojipittan) by Yutaka (Shizuka Hasegawa)	September 2, 2007
Konata's late mother, Kanata, appears as a spirit. As she looks over her family in the room, both Konata and Sōjirō discuss what her life was like, while she was still alive. Although Sōjirō rushed Kanata into love and marriage, Sōjirō was confident that he loved Kanata the most and that she loved him back. A long flashback scene then takes place, where Kanata thinks back on all the happy times she shared with Sōjirō, and concludes that she did love him deeply as well (although she is disturbed about him exposing Konata to eroge). As Konata and Sōjirō prepare to take a picture, Kanata joins in with them, but appears as a shadow in the actual picture. Konata and Sōjirō review the picture and are highly shocked and disturbed at the shadow, and fear that they are cursed. In Lucky Channel, the camera rolls in front of an empty, still destroyed studio. The producer is rambling on about how he fired all three members of the Lucky Channel staff, and how he originally did not want the job, but took it anyway, as a source of power and popularity. In the meantime, the director is trying to tell the producer that the camera is rolling as he is saying this, and at the end of the producer's rant, he finally figures out what the director was trying to tell him.
23	"Delicate Line"; Transliteration: "Bimyō na Rain" (Japanese: 微妙なライン)	"Mikuru Change! and Fight!" (ミクル変身!そして戦闘!, Mikuru Henshin! Soshite Sentō!) by Minoru Shiraishi (Portrayed by Minoru Shiraishi)	"United Force" by Minami Kuribayashi	September 9, 2007
Konata and Yutaka get sick at the same time, but while Yutaka can only rest in bed, Konata plays video games and is mainly using her sickness as an excuse to get out of class. When Minami, Patricia, and Hiyori come to visit Yutaka, Yui reveals that Yutaka has been talking about Minami a lot, but Yui reveals nothing about Yutaka saying anything about either Patricia or Hiyori. After Miyuki hears about gum that will help prevent cavities, she tries a piece, but inadvertently causes an old cavity filling to fall out, resulting her in having to go back to dentist's office. Later, Minami is embarrassed when Miyuki recounts how Konata and her friends compliment her, and then further embarrassed when Miyuki's mother tells of a recent time when she saw Minami at the grocery store. In the ruins of the Lucky Channel set, Yūko Gotō (referred to as "Gotoza-sama") (Yūko Gotō / Megan Hollingshead) convinces Minoru and Akira to work together again, before riding off on her motorcycle.
24	"To Be Announced"; Transliteration: "Mitei" (Japanese: 未定)	"Love is Boomerang" (愛はブーメラン, Ai wa Boomerang) by Minoru Shiraishi (Portrayed by Minoru Shiraishi)	"Take It! Sailor Uniform" (もってけ!セーラーふく, Motteke! Sērāfuku) by A Konata Izumi (Aya Hirano), Kagami Hiiragi (Emiri Katō), Tsukasa Hiiragi (Kaori Fukuhara), and Miyuki Takara (Aya Endo) "The Cape of Age Thirty" (三十路岬, Misoji Misaki) by Akira (Hiromi Konno) "The Minoru Legend of Love" (恋のミノル伝説, Koi no Minoru Densetsu) by Minoru Shiraishi	September 16, 2007
Konata and her friends prepare for the school's cultural festival. Patricia decides to have the girls do a cheerleading session set to the show's theme song, which hassles the girls between preparations for their class' cultural displays and preparations for the routine. At first, Patricia has a hard time trying to convince her friends, but then she bribes Konata with a ticket to an Aya Hirano (the Japanese voice actress of Konata and Haruhi) event, where people could shake hands with her. Konata gets her friends to help out, and even though Kagami is initially against it, she becomes the most enthusiastic of the bunch to do the routine. Akira Kogami has been invited to the school as a special guest, but she and Minoru still despise each other. At the end of the day, Konata, Tsukasa, Kagami, Miyuki, Ayano, and Misao reflect on their last cultural festival. The next day, at the opening of the festival, the girls get ready emotionally for the dance, and as the curtain rises, the screen fades to white.

== Lucky Star OVA (2008) ==
No.	Title	Ending theme	Insert song	Original release date
OVA	"Original Visual Animation"; Transliteration: "Orijinaru na Bijuaru to Animēshon" (Japanese: オリジナルなビジュアルとアニメーション)	"Ai o Torimodose!!" (愛をとりもどせ!!) by Uchōten (Akira Kogami (Portrayed by Hiromi Konno) and Minoru Shiraishi (Portrayed by Minoru Shiraishi))	"Theme of Attack No. 1" (アタックNo.1のテーマ, Attack No. 1 no Theme) by Tsukasa Hiiragi (Kaori Fukuhara)	September 26, 2008
The story is split up into several chapters.: The Beginning and End of Cherry's Day (チェリーちゃんの一日のはじまりとおわり, Cherī-chan no Ichihibi no Hajimari to Owari) - Minami's pet dog, Cherry, is paid a visit by the other characters. While Minami tells her to behave, Cherry shows reluctance to participate. At the end of the day, Minami is concerned that she's not eating any food.; Online Gaming with Friends (ネットゲーにはまる人たち, Nettogē ni Hamaru Hitotachi) - Kagami and Tsukasa join Konata and Nanako in the MMORPG that she often plays in the series. Kagami is confused by all the leetspeak and Tsukasa has trouble figuring out the game mechanics.; Kagami Reluctantly goes to the Ball (ぶとうかいに渋々出かけていくかがみ, Butōkai ni Shibu deka Keteiku Kagami) - Kagami has a Cinderella-esque dream where Konata (dressed in the witch outfit Yuki Nagato sometimes wears) uses magic to take her to the ball dressed as Hatsune Miku. The ball turns out to be a mixed martial arts tournament held by Misao where the winner will become her bride. She is excited to see Kagami and offers to help her through the contest, which Kagami flatly declines, insisting that she be sent home. Konata's magic runs out before Kagami's house can be returned, so Konata makes Kagami say something embarrassing which Tsukasa hears when Kagami wakes up.; The Volleyball Battle against Big Sis! (バレーボールでお姉ちゃんと対決!, Barēbōrū de Onee-chan to Taiketsu!) - A volleyball game ensues in the high school gym in which Misao encourages Tsukasa to defeat her sister and rise out of the ranks of 'side character'.; Four People on the Perplexing Road (道に迷った4人, Michi ni Mayotta Yonnin) - Konata, Kagami, Tsukasa and Miyuki get lost in the woods whilst on a nature hike, trying to figure out where to go and how to survive. Konata provides little to no help towards the situation.; The Mysterious Occurrence at the Pet Shop (ペットショップでの不可思議な出来事, Pettoshoppu deno Fukashigi na Dekigoto) - The girls go to an odd pet shop where they find a rabid Sgt. Frog and Private Tamama and somehow wake up as various frogs.; The seventh segment, also the shortest segment of the OVA, shows the manga shop owner Meito Anizawa in the same MMORPG that the Lucky Star girls were playing, again resulting in his failed attempt to sell Konata in-game items after waiting for her for a long time while she was away from her keyboard. It ends with a live action Lucky Channel segment featuring the two voice actors for Akira Kogami and Minoru Shiraishi.

== Miyakawa-ke no Kūfuku (2013) ==
No.	Title	Ending theme	Insert song	Original release date
1	"1 Hungry: Predetermined Destiny"; Transliteration: "1 Peko: Kimerareta Unmei" (Japanese: 1ぺこ 決められた運命)	"Makegumi" (unfinished version) by Hinata (Maina Shimagata) and Hikage (Koto Kawasaki)	N/A	April 29, 2013
2	"2 Hungry: Golden Dream"; Transliteration: "2 Peko: Kin'iro no yume" (Japanese: 2ぺこ 金色の夢)	"Makegumi" (unfinished version) by Hinata (Maina Shimagata) and Hikage (Koto Kawasaki)	"The Cape of Age Thirty" (三十路岬, Misoji Misaki) by Akira (Hiromi Konno)	May 6, 2013
3	"3 Hungry: Treasures Never Them to Be Used"; Transliteration: "3 Peko: Tsukawarenu Hihō" (Japanese: 3ぺこ 使われぬ秘宝)	"Makegumi" (unfinished version) by Hinata (Maina Shimagata) and Hikage (Koto Kawasaki)	N/A	May 13, 2013
4	"4 Hungry: Unfortunately of Hikage"; Transliteration: "4 Peko: Hikage no Fuun" (Japanese: 4ぺこ ひかげの不運)	"Makegumi" (unfinished version) by Hinata (Maina Shimagata) and Hikage (Koto Kawasaki)	N/A	May 20, 2013
5	"5 Hungry: We are Poor, But We Have a Love"; Transliteration: "5 Peko: Binbō dakedo Ai ga aru" (Japanese: 5ぺこ 貧乏だけど愛がある)	"Makegumi" (unfinished version) by Hinata (Maina Shimagata) and Hikage (Koto Kawasaki)	N/A	May 27, 2013
6	"6 Hungry: Children and Adults"; Transliteration: "6 Peko: Kodomo to Otona" (Japanese: 6ぺこ こどもとおとな)	"Makegumi" (finished version) by Hinata (Maina Shimagata) and Hikage (Koto Kawasaki)	N/A	June 3, 2013
7	"7 Hungry: Because Older Sister"; Transliteration: "7 Peko: Onēchan dakara" (Japanese: 7ぺこ お姉ちゃんだから)	"Makegumi" (finished version) by Hinata (Maina Shimagata) and Hikage (Koto Kawasaki)	N/A	June 10, 2013
8	"8 Hungry: Borderline"; Transliteration: "8 Peko: Bōdarain" (Japanese: 8ぺこ ボーダーライン)	"Makegumi" (finished version) by Hinata (Maina Shimagata) and Hikage (Koto Kawasaki)	N/A	June 17, 2013
9	"9 Hungry: I Can't Leave She"; Transliteration: "9 Peko: Hottokenai yo ne" (Japanese: 9ぺこ ほっとけないよね)	"Makegumi" (finished version) by Hinata (Maina Shimagata) and Hikage (Koto Kawasaki)	N/A	June 24, 2013
10	"10 Hungry: Summer Feature"; Transliteration: "10 Peko: Natsu no Fūbutsushi" (Japanese: 10ぺこ 夏の風物詩)	"Makegumi" (finished version) by Hinata (Maina Shimagata) and Hikage (Koto Kawasaki)	N/A	July 1, 2013
