= Nagisa =

- Gender: Unisex

Origin
- Origin: Japanese
- Meaning: many different meanings depending on the kanji used.

Nagisa (なぎさ, ナギサ) is a Japanese given name used by either sex and is occasionally used as a surname.

== Written forms ==
Nagisa can be written using different kanji characters and can mean:

- 渚, "beach, strand"
- 汀, "water's edge/shore"
- 凪砂, "lull, sand"

The given name can also be written in hiragana or katakana.

== People with the name ==
- Nagisa, a Persian harpist of the 7th century
- Mayumi Nagisa (渚 まゆみ; born 1944), Japanese actress and singer
- Nagisa Aoyama (青山 なぎさ; born 1998), Japanese voice actress and singer
- Nagisa Arakaki (新垣 渚; born 1980), Japanese professional baseball player
- Nagisa Hayashi (林 なぎさ; born 1986), Japanese field hockey player
- Nagisa Ikemoto (池本 凪沙; born 2002), Japanese swimmer
- Nagisa Katahira (片平 なぎさ; born 1959), Japanese television actress
- Nagisa Nozaki (野崎 渚; born 1990), Japanese professional wrestler
- Nagisa Oshima (大島 渚; born 1932), Japanese film director
- Nagisa Sakaguchi (坂口渚沙, born 2000), Japanese actress and YouTuber. She is a member of the female idol group LarmeR, and former member of AKB48
- Nagisa Sakurauchi (櫻内 渚; born 1989), Japanese football player
- Nagisa Shibuya (渋谷 凪咲; born 1996), Japanese singer and former member idol group of NMB48

== Fictional Characters ==
- Nagisa, a character in the Dead or Alive Xtreme Venus Vacation video game
- Nagisa Aoi (渚砂), the main character in the Strawberry Panic! series
- Nagisa Furukawa (古河 渚), the main heroine in the Clannad series
- Nagisa Chiba (千葉 凪沙), a character in the Code Geass anime
- Nagisa Iwashiro (渚), a character in the Battle Arena Toshinden fighting game series
- Nagisa Akatsuki (暁 凪沙), a character in the anime series Strike the Blood
- Nagisa Sagan (目渚), a character of the manga and anime series Loveless
- Nagisa Misumi (美墨 なぎさ), a character in the anime series Futari wa Pretty Cure and its sequel, Futari wa Pretty Cure MaX Heart
- Nagisa Minase is a main character in the anime series Girlfriend Girlfriend
- Nagisa Hazuki (葉月 渚), a character of the anime series Free!
- Nagisa Kanou (加納 渚), the main heroine in the Fight! Iczer One
- Nagisa Motomiya (本宮 凪沙), one of the main characters in AKB0048
- Nagisa Kisaragi (ナギサ・キサラギ), one of the main characters in Firestorm
- Nagisa Momoe (百江 なぎさ), a character in the anime series Puella Magi Madoka Magica
- Nagisa Shiota (潮田 渚), one of the main characters in the manga series Assassination Classroom
- Nagisa Shingetsu (新月 渚), a character from Danganronpa Another Episode: Ultra Despair Girls
- Nagisa Daimonji, a character in the anime series Cardfight!! Vanguard
- Nagisa, an Eevee named and owned by Suiren/Lana in the anime series Pokémon Sun and Moon
- Nagisa Kashiwagi (柏木 渚), a character in Kaguya-sama wa Kokurasetai
- Nagisa Kirifuji (桐藤 ナギサ), a character from the role-playing game Blue Archive
- Nagisa Ran, a character from the rhythm game Ensemble Stars!

=== Surname ===
- Azuya Nagisa, a character from Clamp School Detectives
- Kaworu Nagisa (渚 カヲル), one of the main characters in Neon Genesis Evangelion franchise
- Maria Nagisa, a character who replacing Miss America II from Battle Fever J
- Ouka Nagisa, a character in the video games Super Robot Taisen: Original Generation 2 and Super Robot Wars: Original Generations, as well as the animated adaptation Super Robot Wars Original Generation: The Inspector.
- Kubo Nagisa a main character from the manga and anime series Kubo Won't Let Me Be Invisible is middle child of Saki and Akina Nagisa.

== Other uses ==
- NaGISA, an effort to catalog biodiversity of in-shore areas
