= Akiba-chan (TV series) =

Japanese anime television series

アキバちゃん
- Genre: Comedy, Slice of life
- Anime television series
- Directed by: Atsuya Okabe
- Studio: Tsuburaya Entertainment
- Original network: Kids Station
- Original run: July 25, 2008 – August 1, 2008
- Episodes: 10

Akiba-chan (Japanese: アキバちゃん) is a Japanese original television series of ten anime comedy short films that were broadcast on Kids Station in mid-2008.

== Content ==
Akiba-chan is the name of the main character, a posable figurine. Her name refers to the otaku obsession with collecting anime figurines and other merchandise (see Akiba-kei). She lives in an apartment house named Maison de Akiba. Four other girls share her easy-going, comic adventures. The anime uses a combination of computer animation (CGI) and a stop-motion technique named "figumation" (フィギュメーション). The moe character design is by Akio Watanabe (渡辺 明夫, Watanabe Akio).

== Voice cast ==
- Ai Shimizu – Akiba-chan (アキバちゃん)
- Sayori Ishizuka – Lichy-chan (リキちゃん)
- Mayuko Omimura – Otome-chan (オトメちゃん)
- Saki Fujita – Milk-chan (ミルクちゃん)
- Ryoka Yuzuki – Lilian-chan (リリアンちゃん)

== Titles in other languages ==
- Arabic: الصديقات الخمسة

== Reception ==
The series received poor critical response. CBR lists it among the worst Slice of Life animation shows, describing it as follows: "another rather stereotypical one, featuring again a cast of female characters. In Akiba-chan viewers are introduced to the titular Akiba-chan and her four fellow TV and game fans, all living in the Maison de Akiba apartments. What makes this show stand out is the fact that the whole thing is acted out entirely with dolls and CG effects. The individual episodes have self-contained stories that are cute but shallow, with minimal character development and stiff animation to round out this not-so-satisfying treat."

== Sources ==
- "Akiba-chan" (in Japanese). AllCinema.
- "Akiba-chan" (in Japanese). Kids-Station. Archived from the original on 20 November 2008.
