= CooRie =

- Born: September 19; Ehime
- Origin: Japan
- Genres: Pop
- Occupations: Singer, songwriter
- Years active: 2001–present
- Label: Lantis
- Website: CooRie Official Blog

CooRie is a self-produced Japanese music unit by singer-songwriter Rino that performs songs for anime and games. CooRie used to be a two-person unit when it debuted in 2003, with Rino doing the lyrics and vocals and Naoyuki Osada (長田直之, Osada Naoyuki) doing the music compositions and arrangements. After Osada left by the end of 2003, Rino maintained the name CooRie and composed the music by herself, although she sometimes sings under her own name, especially if the song is for adult games. CooRie's records are released under Lantis and Mellow Head (On the Run).

== Discography ==
=== Singles ===
- 大切な願い / Taisetsu na Negai (Released February 26, 2003)
1. 大切な願い / Taisetsu na Negai – anime television Nanaka 6/17 ending theme
2. 君とナキムシ / Kimi to Nakimushi
3. 大切な願い / Taisetsu na Negai (off vocal)
4. 君とナキムシ / Kimi to Nakimushi (off vocal)
- 流れ星☆ / Nagareboshi☆ (Released April 23, 2003)
1. 流れ星☆ / Nagareboshi☆ — anime television Narue no Sekai opening theme
2. ステレオ / Stereo – Radio show Narue no Sekai TV ending theme
3. 流れ星☆ / Nagareboshi☆ (off vocal)
4. ステレオ / Stereo (off vocal)
- サクラサクミライコイユメ／未来へのMelody / Sakura Saku Mirai Koi Yume/Mirai e no Melody (Released July 24, 2003)
2. 未来へのMelody / Mirai e no Melody – anime television D.C.: Da Capo 1st ending theme
4. 未来へのMelody / Mirai e no Melody (off vocal)
- あなたと言う時間 / Anata to Iu Jikan (Released March 24, 2004)
1. あなたと言う時間 / Anata to Iu Jikan – anime television Hikari to Mizu no Daphne ending theme
4. あなたと言う時間 / Anata to Iu Jikan (off vocal)
- センチメンタル / Sentimental (Released April 21, 2004)
1. センチメンタル / Sentimental – anime television Midori no Hibi opening theme
2. 戻らない日々 / Modoranai Hibi
3. センチメンタル / Sentimental (Off vocal)
4. 戻らない日々 / Modoranai Hibi (Off vocal)
- 光のシルエット / Hikari no Silhouette (Released June 8, 2005)
1. 光のシルエット / Hikari no Silhouette – anime television Zettai Shōnen opening theme
2. メロトロン / Mellotron
3. 光のシルエット / Hikari no Silhouette (off vocal)
4. メロトロン / Mellotron (off vocal)
- 暁に咲く詩 / Akatsuki ni Saku Uta (Released August 24, 2005)
1. 暁に咲く詩 / Akatsuki ni Saku Uta – anime television D.C.S.S.: Da Capo Second Season ending theme
2. かくれんぼ同盟 / Kakurenbo Doumei
3. 暁に咲く詩 / Akatsuki ni Saku Uta (Off Vocal)
4. かくれんぼ同盟 / Kakurenbo Doumei (Off Vocal)
- 風～スタートライン～ / Kaze: startline (Released December 21, 2005)
1. 風～スタートライン～ / Kaze: startline — PC game Joukyou Kaishi! opening theme
2. 月明かりセレナード / Tsukiakari Serenade — PC game Joukyou Kaishi! ending theme
3. 風～スタートライン～ / Kaze: startline (off vocal)
4. 月明かりセレナード / Tsukiakari Serenade (off vocal)
- いろは / Iroha (Released February 8, 2006)
1. いろは / Iroha — anime television Binchou-tan opening theme
2. 君にヘッドフォン / Kimi ni Headphone
3. いろは / Iroha (off vocal)
4. 君にヘッドフォン / Kimi ni Headphone (off vocal)
- クロス＊ハート / Cross*Heart (Released January 24, 2007)
1. クロス＊ハート / Cross*Heart – anime television Kyoushirou to Towa no Sora opening theme
2. 水玉 / Mizutama
3. クロス＊ハート / Cross*Heart <instrumental>
4. 水玉 / Mizutama <instrumental>
- 優しさは雨のように / Yasashisa wa Ame no you ni (Released October 24, 2007)
1. 優しさは雨のように / Yasashisa wa Ame no you ni – anime television D.C. II: Da Capo II ending theme
2. 恋想モジュレーター / Rensou Modulator
3. 優しさは雨のように / Yasashisa wa Ame no you ni (off vocal)
4. 恋想モジュレーター / Rensou Modulator (off vocal)
- 僕たちの行方 / Bokutachi no Yukue (Released April 23, 2008)
1. 僕たちの行方 / Bokutachi no Yukue – anime television D.C.II S.S. ~Da Capo II Second Season~ ending theme
2. シンプルになれ。 / Simple ni Nare.
3. 僕たちの行方 / Bokutachi no Yukue (off vocal)
4. シンプルになれ。 / Simple ni Nare. (off vocal)
- パルトネール / Partenaire (Released November 27, 2008)
1. パルトネール / Partenaire (Partner in French)
2. Thank you for the Music
3. パルトネール / Partenaire (off vocal)
4. Thank you for the Music (off vocal)
- IF：この世界で / IF: Kono Sekai de (Released April 29, 2009)
1. IF：この世界で / IF: Kono Sekai de — PS2 game D.C.I.F. ~Da Capo~ Innocent Finale opening theme
2. ALIVE
3. IF：この世界で / IF: Kono Sekai de (off vocal)
4. ALIVE (off vocal)
- 星屑のサラウンド / Hoshikuzu no Surround (Released August 26, 2009)
1. 星屑のサラウンド / Hoshikuzu no Surround — anime television Sora no Manimani ending theme
2. 闇に咲く星のように / Yami ni Saku Hoshi no You ni – anime television Sora no Manimani Ep. 4 ending song
3. 星屑のサラウンド / Hoshikuzu no Surround (OFF VOCAL)
4. 闇に咲く星のように / Yami ni Saku Hoshi no You ni (OFF VOCAL)
- 愛永久 ～Fortune favors the brave～／めぐり愛逢い / Ai Eikyuu ~Fortune favors the brave~/Meguri Ai Ai (Released January 27, 2010)
2. めぐり愛逢い / Meguri Ai Ai – Online game Ai Sp@ce theme song
4. めぐり愛逢い / Meguri Ai Ai (off vocal)
- 夢想庭園 / Musō Teien (Released July 7, 2010)
1. 夢想庭園 / Musō Teien – OVA Book Girl opening theme
2. Like A Music
3. 夢想庭園 / Musō Teien (instrumental)
4. Like A Music (instrumental)
- ダ・カーポIII ～キミにささげる あいのマホウ～ (Released April 27, 2012)
2. All is love for you
4. All is love for you （Off Vocal）
- 会いたいよ／メグル／REFLECTION (Released February 13, 2013)
2. メグル
5. メグル （Off Vocal）
- 『BON-BON』 (Released May 11, 2016) LACM-14477
1. BON-BON – anime television Tanaka-kun is Always Listless ending theme
2. Melodic Future
3. BON-BON （Off Vocal）
4. Melodic Future （Off Vocal）

=== Albums ===
- 1st album: 秋やすみ / Aki Yasumi (Released September 29, 2004) LHCA-5001
1. はじめに / Hajime ni
2. センチメンタル / Sentimental
3. 大切な願い / Taisetsu na Negai
4. あなたと言う時間 / Anata to Iu Jikan
5. 秋やすみ / Aki Yasumi
6. ステレオ / Stereo
7. 流れ星☆ / Nagareboshi☆
8. 未来へのMelody / Mirai e no Melody
9. 存在 / Sonzai – anime television D.C.: Da Capo 2nd ending theme
10. 想い出トランク / Omoide Trunk
11. 小さな手紙 / Chiisana Tegami – anime television Midori no Hibi insert song
12. えんぴつ / Enpitsu
- Self-cover album: 木漏れ日カレンダー / Komorebi Calendar (Released March 24, 2005) LHCA-5005
1. そよ風のハーモニー / Soyokaze no Harmony – anime television D.C.: Da Capo insert song
2. 空のリフレイン / Sora no Refrain – PS2 game SAKURA: setsugetsuka theme song
3. Parade — My-HiME Radio: Fuuka Gakuen Housoubu theme song
4. 記憶のゆりかご / Kioku no Yurikago — anime television D.C.: Da Capo Sakura Yoshino song
5. 幸せレシピ / Shiawase Recipe — Radio show Da Capo Hatsunejima Housoukyoku 1st opening theme
6. 小さな傘 / Chiisana Kasa — from Mai Nakahara's mini album Homework
7. Precious time – PS2 game Tentama 2wins theme song
8. 君が望む永遠 / Kimi ga Nozomu Eien – PC game Kimi ga Nozomu Eien ending theme
9. Eternal Love～眩しい季節～ / Eternal Love: mabushii kisetsu — PS2 game D.C.P.S.: Da Capo~ Plus Situation ending theme
10. Dream～The ally of～ — PC game D.C.: Da Capo ending theme
- 2nd album: トレモロ / Tremolo (Released June 21, 2006) LHCA-5040
1. 光のシルエット / Hikari no Silhouette
2. 暁に咲く詩 / Akatsuki ni Saku Uta
3. いたずらな雨 / Itazura na Ame
4. 天空の花 / Tenkuu no Hana – PS2 game Mabino x Style ending theme
5. 月明かりセレナード / Tsukiakari Serenade
6. バスタブブルーズ / Bathtub Blues
7. 記憶ラブレター / Kioku Love Letter – anime television D.C.S.S.: Da Capo Second Season' episodes 24 & 25 ending theme
8. 風～スタートライン～ / Kaze: startline
9. 心編み / Kokoroami
10. メロトロン / Mellotron
11. いろは / Iroha
12. トレモロ～夢の続き～ / Tremolo: yume no tsuzuki
- 3rd album: 旋律のフレア / Senritsu no Flare (Released January 23, 2008) LHCA-5075
1. 旋律のフレア / Senritsu no Flare
2. クロス＊ハート / Cross*Heart
3. Spring has come – PC game D.C.II: Da Capo II ending theme
4. ウソツキ / Usotsuki — anime television School Days ending theme
5. SWEETEST – PS2 game Strawberry Panic! opening theme
6. 君DK / Kimi DK
7. 探し物 / Sagashimono
8. 桜の羽根～Endless memory～ / Sakura no Hane: Endless memory — PC game D.C.II Spring Celebration grand ending theme
9. 水玉 / Mizutama
10. リトル・モア / Little More — PC game Muv-Luv (all-age version) Miki Tamase ending theme
11. 優しさは雨のように / Yasashisa wa Ame no you ni
12. 想い / Omoi
- 4th album: Imagination Market (Released October 21, 2009) LHCA-5111
1. Listen
2. Imagination Market
3. パルトネール / Partenaire
4. ALIVE
5. 僕たちの行方 / Bokutachi no Yukue
6. 雨上がりの君のもとへ / Ame Agari no Kimi no Moto e
7. キミナシノセカイ / Kimi Nashi no Sekai
8. Thank you for the Music
9. 想い出に変わるまで / Omoide ni Kawaru Made
10. 君にヘッドフォン / Kimi ni Headphone
11. IF：この世界で / IF: Kono Sekai de
12. 幸せになるために / Shiawase ni Naru Tame ni
- 5th album: Heavenly Days (Released October 20, 2010) LHCA-5121
1. ノスタルジアに愛を込めて / Nostalgia ni Ai wo Komete
2. 夢想庭園 / Musō Teien
3. 煌めきHarmonics / Kirameki Harmonics – anime television Sora no Manimani insert song
4. 闇に咲く星のように / Yami ni Saku Hoshi no Yō ni
5. 星屑のサラウンド / Hoshikuzu no Surround
6. 音速タイムマシンに乗って / Onsoku Time Machine ni Notte
7. 金色の風景 / Kin-iro no Fuukei — Bungaku Shōjo to Yumeutsutsu no Melody image song
8. 風をあつめて 〜CooRie Bossa Mix Version〜 / Kaze wo Atsumete ~CooRie Bossa Mix Version~
9. Like A Music
10. My Dearest – PC game Kotori Love Ex P theme song
11. めぐり愛逢い / Meguri Ai Ai
12. 桜風 / Sakura Kaze – PC game D.C.II Fall in Love ~Da Capo II~Fall in Love grand ending theme
13. Heavenly Days — Maria-sama ga Miteru movie theme
- Compilation album: Brillant (Released April 4, 2013) LACA-9279 ～ LACA-9280
  disc – 1
  1. 大切な願い / Taisetsu na Negai
  2. 流れ星☆ / Nagareboshi
  3. Dream～the ally of～
  4. 存在 / Sonzai
  5. 未来へのMelody / Mirai he no Melody
  6. センチメンタル / Sentimental
  7. いろは / Iroha
  8. あなたと言う時間 / Anata to Iu Jikan
  9. 旋律のフレア / Senritsu no Flare
  10. 君DK / Kimi DK
  11. ウソツキ / Usotuski
  12. Spring has come
  13. 優しさは雨のように / Yasahisa ha Ame no Youni
  14. 君が望む永遠 / Kimi ga Nozomu Eien
  disc – 2
  1. クロス＊ハート / Cross Heart
  2. 光のシルエット / Hikari no Silhouette
  3. 暁に咲く詩 / Akatsuki ni Saku Uta
  4. 僕たちの行方 / Bokutachi no Yukue
  5. 雨上がり君のもとへ / Ameagari Kimi no Moto he
  6. パルトネール / Partenaire
  7. 星屑のサラウンド / Hoshikuzu no Surround
  8. Thank you for the Music
  9. IF：この世界で / IF – Kono Sekai de
  10. 夢想庭園 / Musou Teien
  11. Heavenly Days
  12. 水性メロディ / Suisei Melody
  13. All is Love for you
  14. 秘密 / Himitsu
- Self Cover album: Melodium (Released December 18, 2013) LACA-15363
1. DreamRiser
2. Super Noisy Nova
3. いじわるな恋 / Ijiwaru na Koi
4. 残酷な願いの中で / Zankoku na Negai no Naka de
5. ナミダで咲く花 / Namida de Saku Hana
6. 宿題 / Shukudai
7. 陽だまりドライブ / Hidamari Drive
8. 心の窓辺にて / Kokoro no Madobe Nite
9. 君と愛になる / Kimi to Ai ni Naru
10. Brand-new Season
11. 透明な羽根で / Toumei no Hana de
12. PIANOTE
- Self Cover album: Melodium2 (Released December 9, 2015) LACA-15532
1. Planet Freedom
2. Sentimental Venus
3. REFLECTION
4. ひだまり笑顔 / Hida mari egao
5. ハルモニア/ Harumonia
6. Melodium
- 6th Album セツナポップに焦がされて / Setsuna Pop ni Kogasarete (Released December 20, 2017) LACA-15668
1. エクレア / Ekurea
2. セツナポップに焦がされて / Setsuna Pop ni Kogasarete
3. Rearhythm -Album ver-
4. 愛しさの雫 / Itoshisa no shizuku
5. 終わらないPrelude / Owaranai Prelude
6. HAPPY CRESCENDO
7. フラクタル / Furakutaru (Fractal)
8. 春風とクリシェ / Harukaze to kurishe
9. MISTY LOVE
10. キミとMUSIC -Album ver- / Kimi to MUSIC -Album ver-
11. VOICE SONG
12. BON-BON

=== Other ===
- 2003-12-26: Onegai Twins Image Vocal Album: Esquisse — episode 6 image song "Kiss no Meiro" (キスの迷路)
- 2006-09-21: PlayStation 2 Game Strawberry Panic! Original Sound Track — opening theme "Sweetest"
- 2006-10-25: "MUV-LUV" collection of Standard Edition songs: divergence — Muv-Luv Extra Miki Tamase ending theme "Little More" (リトル・モア)
- 2007-05-23: D.C.II Spring Celebration Vocal Mini Album: Songs from D.C.II Spring Celebration — grand ending theme "Sakura no Hane: Endless memory" (桜の羽根～Endless memory～)
- 2007-08-22: School Days Ending Theme+ — anime television ending theme "Usotsuki" (ウソツキ)
