= List of Strawberry Panic! characters =

The girls of Strawberry Panic! (left to right): Top row: Kagome, Remon, Chiyo, Chikaru Middle row: Tamao, Nagisa, Shizuma, Tsubomi Bottom row: Yaya, Kizuna, Hikari, Amane.

This page lists the characters from the manga, light novel and anime series Strawberry Panic!. The characters are divided depending on which of the three schools they attend. Originally, when the series was first created in the short stories stage, there were twelve characters—four from each school. From Miator: Nagisa, Shizuma, Chiyo, and Tamao; from Spica: Hikari, Amane, Tsubomi, and Yaya; from Lulim: Kizuna, Chikaru, Kagome, and Remon. Later, additional characters were introduced in the manga and light novel stage of the series in order to create new plotlines and conflict. Some of the new characters include: Miyuki Rokujō, Kaori Sakuragi, Shion Tōmori, Kaname Kenjō, and Momomi Kiyashiki.

== Attending Miator ==
Nagisa Aoi (蒼井 渚砂, Aoi Nagisa)
Voiced by: Mai Nakahara
Nagisa is the main protagonist who suddenly transfers to an all-girls school called St. Miator Girl's Academy. The reason she transferred is because her parents went overseas for work, leaving Nagisa behind. Nagisa ended up transferring to Miator after her aunt, who is a past graduate of St. Miator, the oldest school of Astraea Hill, recommended she attend.
She seems to have a peppy personality, which can usually cause her to get in trouble if it gets the best of her. This trait is apparently quite distinguishing, as Amane Ohtori from Spica had commented that the other Miator students remind her of "caged birds", but that Nagisa is extraordinarily different. One might theorize that she is one of few Miator students not deeply enmeshed in that school's traditions and customs and therefore more free-spirited and more likely to act according to her own impulses, rather than according to expected patterns. She certainly has a gift for energizing her surroundings and the people around her. From their first meeting on, Nagisa gradually develops a strong attraction towards Shizuma; the Etoile may very well be Nagisa's first love.
Other things about her include that Nagisa is easily frightened, making her tremble at even the slightest mention of something scary, especially ghosts. This continues the theme that she tends to be more childish than most of the rest of the students her age. She has a large appetite, especially for sweet foods. Also, she admires others for their artistic abilities. She herself has displayed an aptitude for acting and the piano, both nurtured through interaction with Shizuma. She is a fairly talented actress, being able to take over the lead role of Carmen when Chikaru is injured. Her weakness is French, for which she requires tutoring from Tamao and Shizuma.
Nagisa bears a striking resemblance to Shizuma's deceased Etoile partner, Kaori Sakuragi. The only difference are their hair colors (Kaori's is black, while Nagisa's is red) and Kaori's pale skin.
Shizuma Hanazono (花園 静馬, Hanazono Shizuma)
Voiced by: Hitomi Nabatame
The current Etoile, Shizuma is a highly respected and much beloved person to most of the other students attending the three schools. She looks very mysterious and also seems to have a number of secrets to match this visage. This makes her a difficult person to figure out or to even talk to for someone just meeting her. Most of her secrets—and personal problems—seem to be related to her prior relationship with Kaori Sakuragi.
Shizuma is very skilled on the piano and likes to play it constantly. Much of the time, she does not enjoy the dull work of the Etoile, so she often finds ways to skip on her duties, much to the annoyance of Miyuki Rokujō. However, Nagisa manages to persuade Shizuma to resume performing her duties. She is a skilled actress and has participated in Astraea's annual play twice in a row, playing Don Jose in the production of Carmen. She is also noted to excel in French.
Shizuma quickly develops a crush on Nagisa, but has also been seen showing interest in other girls. Despite initially seeing Nagisa as "just one more pretty girl" to get close with, Shizuma eventually comes to see her as different. Early in the development of her relationship with Nagisa, she is only trying to replace the hole in her heart left by her former Etoile partner and first love, Kaori, who had died the same year they had been elected the Astrea Hill Etoile. Towards the end of the anime, after a series of guilt-ridden conflicts and her own self-discovery, Shizuma realizes she is truly in love with Nagisa.
Tamao Suzumi (涼水 玉青, Suzumi Tamao)
Voiced by: Ai Shimizu
Tamao is Nagisa's roommate. She is the first person Nagisa gets to get to know at the school and Tamao even helps Nagisa by showing her around the campus by introducing her to several of the other students. After an interesting introduction, Tamao early on showed interest in Nagisa and it quickly became apparent that she has a crush on her, which eventually turned into love. It is this attraction she has that gives her a sense of determination to be around Nagisa. Unfortunately for Tamao, Nagisa herself appears to remain oblivious to the depth of Tamao's feelings, and considers her only as a best friend throughout the series. Tamao often goes overboard with regards to her obsession with Nagisa, for example, calling her "my Nagisa", scaring her just to capture her "cute" screams on tape and taking full body measurements of her under the pretense of ordering a school uniform when, in actuality, she just wants to write this "precious data" in her notebook.
Tamao has a nice, helpful personality and sometimes enjoys gossiping about other people when it comes to matters of love and attraction. Also, Nagisa and Tamao tend to be a lot alike, in that they are both usually filled with energy and share a lot of the same interests. Highly literate, she is a member of the Literature Club and loves to write poems. She writes the script for Astraea's adaption of Carmen. She is well regarded among her fellow Miator students; many of the first-years see her as a viable Etoile candidate.
Miyuki Rokujō (六条 深雪, Rokujō Miyuki)
Voiced by: Junko Noda
As the student council president of Miator, Miyuki tries her best at doing her job in keeping everything in line. She is stern, yet understanding, and quite sensitive; Shizuma describes her as a crybaby. Often, when Shizuma is neglecting her duties as the Etoile, she gets annoyed at her and scolds her about it, which makes them seem more like a mother-child pair than as classmates. The two have been rooming together since they arrived at Miator years earlier, but their "parent-child" roles were initially reversed as Shizuma comforted the young homesick Miyuki. Nevertheless, the two seem to be close friends and have considerable knowledge of and insight into each other. After the death of Kaori Sakuragi, Miyuki became Shizuma's assistant and has remained a confidante of some importance. It is implied that she has unrequited feelings for Shizuma despite having to marry a fiancé decided at birth after she graduates. When Shizuma forcefully kisses Miyuki as a "joke", she sees this as cruel perhaps because she is being made to taste what she cannot have, which makes her slap Shizuma. While she wishes for Shizuma to be happy and encourages her, she seems uncomfortable with Shizuma's relationship with Kaori and later Nagisa, albeit for different reasons.
As the student council president, she has several responsibilities to attend to. So far, she has had to intervene into a few of Nagisa's mistakes, making sure that she understands the rules of the school. When in student council meetings, she usually gets in disputes over Astraea matters with Shion Tōmori, the student council president of Spica.
Chiyo Tsukidate (月館 千代, Tsukidate Chiyo)
Voiced by: Chiwa Saitō
Chiyo is a young girl who recently arrived at Astraea Hill, where she quickly became the "room temp" (a younger student appointed to perform cleaning duty as a maid for senior students, who in return receives help with studies and, presumably, other matters from those same seniors) for Nagisa and Tamao, which incidentally is exactly what she wanted. Chiyo tends to be a very shy girl who is unable to articulate herself forcefully enough most of the time and is also rather a klutz. Additionally, she too seems to have a crush on Nagisa, who she refers to as Nagisa-onee-sama, which can also be construed as a form of admiration and idolism on her part. Also, she is a member of the Library Club and works as a librarian in Astraea's Library.
Chiyo tries to do her best most of the time, especially when around Nagisa, though things do not always go her way. So far, she has been very grateful to be employed as the room temp for Nagisa and Tamao, but especially because of her chance to be close with Nagisa.
Kaori Sakuragi (桜木 花織, Sakuragi Kaori)
Voiced by: Kotomi Iwamura
Kaori was a young girl who came to attend Miator starting off in her first year. Ever since she was young, Kaori has been physically weak due to an affliction which remains unnamed, but apparently affected her breathing and possibly her heart. It was due to being this weak since birth that she spent most of her elementary school years at home, too sick to attend. She had a placid personality, and dealt with her condition with surprisingly good grace.
Upon arrival at Miator, she was entrusted to Miyuki and Shizuma in order to look after her and make sure she had a worthwhile experience while at the school. Eventually, Kaori and Shizuma formed an intimate relationship, which is why when Shizuma entered to become the next Etoile, she chose Kaori as her partner. However, by the time they both had become Etoile, Kaori's body had deteriorated too much and before long she died, leaving Shizuma with a broken heart. Kaori apparently anticipated some of Shizuma's response and left her a letter, which Shizuma is very late to find.
Sister Mizue Hamasaka (シスター・浜坂瑞枝, Sisutā Hamasaka Mizue)
Voiced by: Kaori Yamagata
Sister Mizue is an old woman who is the main person in charge of Miator. Her main duties include handing out punishments and reprimanding students when they do something wrong. The range of punishments can vary, but they can get rather outrageous, such as dusting the entire staircase in the enormous church. She seems to be an angry woman most of the time and rarely ever smiles. This could be because she has to handle unruly students on a daily basis and is tired of all the problems that she has to deal with, or she could just have a poor disposition when it comes to people much younger than herself. She is probably one of the three Sisters in the school system that head the three respective schools, though the other two have yet to be introduced.

== Attending Spica ==
Hikari Konohana (此花 光莉, Konohana Hikari)
Voiced by: Miyu Matsuki
A rather shy and quiet girl most of the time, Hikari tends to not be very outspoken and it usually takes a lot for her to say what is really on her mind. Much like Nagisa Aoi, Hikari is also a transfer student, arriving at Spica in the second year. In that same year, she joined the St. Spica Choir (also known as the Saintly Chorus) with her best friend and roommate Yaya Nanto. Later, she starts to develop a crush on Amane Ohtori, and they begin showing intense feelings of attraction for one another.
She tends to be a physically weak girl who is fairly easy to be taken advantage of, much to her dismay. Unpleasant experiences related to her vulnerability seem to have inspired some fear of unexpected physical proximity in her. She does, however, have friends that look out for her well being. Hikari also seems to be very religious and can be seen praying within the church or at the Spica fountain with a statue depicting the Virgin Mary on the school grounds.
Amane Ohtori (鳳 天音, Ōtori Amane)
Voiced by: Yuko Kaida
Amane appears to be a very loved and respected member of the school, much like Shizuma Hanazono, although she is more of a local celebrity of Spica. She is often seen riding a white horse named Star Bright, which makes her seem more like a prince (a title which Shizuma later marks her with) from a fairy tale. Furthermore, she has a very masculine appearance, and in effect, a lot of the students at St. Spica are her fans. She tends to have a silent demeanor, which also makes her seem intimidating, making her difficult to talk with or approach. It seems that she is actually quite shy and states that she dislikes being the center of attention, causing her to decline acceptance of presents from her many fangirls (with the exception of Hikari).
She is a strong candidate to become the next Etoile, but it does not seem she wants to accept the title. This could be due to her not wanting all the attention or possibly because she just does not want to take on all the responsibility of representing the three schools. She too has a crush on Hikari, showing her affection much in the way a man does for a woman. Amane, much like Yaya, looks out for Hikari and protects her when need be.
Yaya Nanto (南都 夜々, Nanto Yaya)
Voiced by: Natsuko Kuwatani
Yaya is Hikari's roommate. She is a somewhat forceful girl who also seems to look out for Hikari, who she is in love with. She often has to force herself to smile as she helps Hikari get closer to Amane, and could only watch them from afar. So far, she has tried to become closer with Hikari, but due to Hikari's interest in Amane, Yaya is always shot down. This tends to make Yaya very depressed and reserved, causing her to avoid human contact for a time.
Yaya is good friends with Hikari though they have only known each other for about a year once the story begins. Yaya got Hikari to join the St. Spica Choir the previous year, most likely in an attempt to give her more self-esteem which she seems to be lacking in, though Hikari did show interest in singing as well. Yaya is one of the most talented members of the choir, as noted by Tsubomi Okuwaka, though, as noted by Hikari, she seems to need more dedication.
Yaya has a rebellious side, sometimes going against school rules or what is normally accepted. She tends to be very outspoken and enjoys criticizing other students she dislikes. However, when it comes to matters of love, she seems to be very shy about her feelings, substituting words with actions, sometimes with adverse results—especially when Hikari talks about her feelings for Amane in front of her. She loves to tease people. Also, she rather dislikes first year students—such as Tsubomi Okuwaka—because they are noisy and annoying; at least for a time.
Tsubomi Okuwaka (奥若 蕾, Okuwaka Tsubomi)
Voiced by: Sakura Nogawa
Tsubomi, a first year student who joins Spica at the same time as Nagisa is enrolled into Miator, tends to act mature for her age, and is often capable of cowing senior students by pure force of personality. She also seems to have a crush on Hikari, although she calls it pure admiration. Also, she often lectures Hikari and Yaya when they do something wrong in regards to their school work and responsibilities. She is a member of the St. Spica Choir along with Hikari and Yaya and it is believed that the reason she joined was because of Hikari, though Tsubomi denies this. There are some indications that Tsubomi may be in love with Yaya, later in the series. As vague as these indications are, it is uncertain whether the interest is of a purely friendly or a romantic nature. Tsubomi is sometimes embarrassed while around Hikari due to either what Hikari says or of what others say. She tends to get angry or flustered easily, giving her an outspoken and very expressive personality. In effect, she can be loud in her opinions of others. In the light novels and manga, she is the secretary for the student council of Spica.
Shion Tōmori (冬森 詩音, Tōmori Shion)
Voiced by: Hyo-sei
The student council president of Spica, Shion is a very shrewd girl and is constantly scheming something. However, despite her initial demeanor, she is moderate in personality and rather disinclined towards extreme measures and outright obstructionism. This is in contrast to her associates Kaname Kenjō and Momomi Kiyashiki. After the current Etoile graduates, she would like very much for an attendant of Spica to become the next Etoile and is constantly pushing for this to take place. Her best bet right now is to try to convince Amane Ohtori to consider the position, though Shion has had much trouble already trying to convey this to her. When in student council meetings, she argues a lot with Miyuki Rokujō, the student council president from Miator, regarding Astraea matters and how the Etoile, who is from Miator, tends not to attend such meetings. In such meetings, she is able to express the dominant side of her personality, often becoming very animated.
Kaname Kenjō (剣城 要, Kenjō Kaname)
Voiced by: Sayaka Kinoshita
Kaname is a very domineering, forceful, and devious girl who is also on the student council for Spica. She often likes to take matters into her own hands when Shion—or Kaname herself—does not get her way. Kaname apparently considers herself irresistible and has no interest in objections to the contrary. Much like Amane, her appearance and personality make her seem more masculine than feminine. She is later revealed to be jealous of Amane, who has effortlessly defeated her at everything since she first came to Spica. It is also suggested that she felt an attraction to Amane at one point, or at least that her self-comparison to Amane has become a central factor of her life.
Her main friend and ally is Momomi Kiyashiki, who is very much like Kaname in personality. In the anime, they share a sexual relationship and are in love with each other; they are the first explicitly lesbian couple depicted in the series. Together, they are the closest thing to antagonists in the story. Ironically, since Kaname is usually the instigator of their plans, she also seems to possess the strongest sense of personal honor, desiring victory through achievement, not forfeit.
Unknown to Shion, her current plot, with help from Momomi, is to help Spica gain the Etoile title. Also unknown to Shion, she apparently wishes to claim the title for herself and Momomi, which means she is scheming against Shion's favored candidate as well. Her tactics have centered around disqualifying the only other candidate, Amane, by isolating her from her only potential running mate for the position, Hikari. Her methods, which she herself has termed as "seduction", might more justifiably be called attempted rape. She also has a tendency to favor self-aggrandizement over cooperation, and will go so far as to be a deliberate obstructionist if she does not get her way.
In the light novels and manga, Kaname has a slightly different appearance, the most notable trait being her long hair. She is clearly in love with Amane and wants to become an Etoile with her.
Momomi Kiyashiki (鬼屋敷 桃実, Kiyashiki Momomi)
Voiced by: Saori Goto
Somewhat of a snob, Momomi sees Spica as being superior to the other schools of Astraea. Being on the student council for Spica, Momomi helps by giving advice to Shion or agreeing with most of what Kaname says and suggests. This makes her seem like not much of an important character, though she serves to continue the conflict between Amane and Kaname, and her unconditional support may be pivotal for Kaname's behavior. When Kaname thinks up a plan, she helps her carry out it out, but tries not to get directly involved, watching from the sidelines instead.
In Momomi's personal and sexual relationship with Kaname, she is ironically usually the most aggressive partner. Even more ironic is the fact that she is madly in love with Kaname, and constantly wants her loving attention. Eventually it is discovered that Kaname may have not loved Momomi as much as Momomi loved Kaname, due to Kaname having an intense interest in Amane since early on. Momomi ultimately discovers this which leads her to slap Kaname and leave her with a broken heart. However, Kaname is later able to leave Amane in her past and move on with her life. It is implied that Kaname and Momomi start anew.

== Attending Lulim ==
Chikaru Minamoto (源 千華留, Minamoto Chikaru)
Voiced by: Saki Nakajima
Chikaru, a free-minded, playful girl and natural leader, occupies several positions of authority in the school: She is the student council of Lulim, the President of the Transformation Club (where members cosplay various themes), the Secret Club (where members try to solve mysteries), and a variety of other clubs which she regularly creates. She has a friendly personality and enjoys helping others when they need it, which makes her an excellent candidate for the student council. Also, Chikaru tends to be very knowledgeable about the schools and their inner workings. When in Astraea student council meetings, she often lets the other two school representatives argue with each other while she sits back and observes their behavior. She is not easily perturbed and frequently helps out those who have trouble, regardless which school they attend.
Chikaru has exhibited a strong familiarity and faculty with the arts in costume design, costume creation and acting. She plays the title role in Astraea's production of Carmen, as well as designing the costumes for the show. In the manga and light novels, she has a bit of a more hidden agenda that she sees Lulim as a dark horse and sees the conflict between Spica and Miator as a means to push Lulim to prominence.
Kizuna Hyūga (日向 絆奈, Hyūga Kizuna)
Voiced by: Ai Shimizu
Kizuna seems very outgoing, hyper and a bit of a klutz. She spends a lot of time with Chikaru Minamoto and Remon Natsume, making her a part of the Transformation and Secret Clubs. She tends to be very expressive in her actions and words, not wasting any chance to introduce herself to someone new. Since Chikaru is her senpai and student council president, Kizuna enjoys following Chikaru's decisions and finds a lot of fun in doing so, whether they be club related or not. Since she is only in her second year at Lulim, she tends to be rather immature compared to others.
Additionally, she may be in an intimate relationship with Remon, though this is still uncertain. What is certain is that they sometimes share a bed (which, admittedly, is no firm indicator of physical intimacy in this series), that they are often depicted holding hands or touching, and that they have kissed at least once in front of an unimpressed Chikaru. This latter act may have been no more than her way to cheat and win a thumb wrestling match, although the fact that this act distracted Remon sufficiently might be telling in and of itself.
Remon Natsume (夏目 檸檬, Natsume Remon)
Voiced by: Ui Miyazaki
Remon is much like Kizuna in personality, though not as clumsy, she is also one of the members of the Transformation and Secret Clubs. She tends to be more serious than Kizuna, though she does not miss the chance to get excited about matters such as love and attraction. Remon and Kizuna seem to have known each other long enough to become best friends and in effect they are almost always seen together. When it comes to the two of them, Kizuna usually does most of the talking while Remon often agrees with her companion, though she will offer up an opinion when need be. As stated above, she may be in an intimate relationship with Kizuna, though this is still uncertain. However, she appeared decidedly unhappy when Kagome was sharing a room with them during summer school.
Kagome Byakudan (白檀 籠女, Byakudan Kagome)
Voiced by: Yukari Fukui
Kagome, a soft-spoken first-grader who appears rather sad and lonely, is best known for her habit of carrying around a teddy bear named Percival (パーシバル, Pāshibaru) everywhere she goes and talking to him as if he were a real person. She is passive in relations with others and often makes references through Percival, saying things such as "Percival thinks..", rather than "I think..." She eventually becomes friends with Chikaru, Kizuna and Remon after following them around for a while, and gradually becomes a member of their tight-knit group. She is apparently also fond of Nagisa Aoi from Miator, who she refers to as Nagisa-onee-sama, due to an incident between them which involved an umbrella. Kagome seems to have a high degree of hidden artistic abilities, as is shown when she is building sand castles, or acting as Romeo Montague in Romeo and Juliet. She also has a heightened level of perception of others' feelings.
