= List of Strawberry Panic! albums =

This article lists the albums attributed to the anime and visual novel adaptations of Strawberry Panic!.

== Anime OP/ED ==
=== Shōjo Meiro de Tsukamaete ===
Shōjo Meiro de Tsukamaete (少女迷路でつかまえて) is a single by Aki Misato released on April 26, 2006, in Japan by Lantis. The song "Shōjo Meiro de Tsukamaete" was the first opening theme to the anime Strawberry Panic!

==== Track listing ====
1. "Shōjo Meiro de Tsukamaete" (少女迷路でつかまえて) – 4:08
2. "before" – 4:27
3. "Shōjo Meiro de Tsukamaete" (off vocal) (少女迷路でつかまえて) – 4:08
4. "before" (off vocal) – 4:27

=== Himitsu Dolls ===
Himitsu Dolls (秘密ドールズ, Himitsu Dōruzu) is a single by Mai Nakahara and Ai Shimizu released on May 24, 2006, in Japan by Lantis. The song "Himitsu Dolls" was the first ending theme to the anime Strawberry Panic!

==== Track listing ====
1. "Himitsu Dolls" (秘密ドールズ, Himitsu Dōruzu) – 3:55
2. "Kajitsuteki Borderline" (果実的ボーダーライン) – 4:48
3. "Himitsu Dolls" (off vocal) (秘密ドールズ, Himitsu Dōruzu) – 3:55
4. "Kajitsuteki Borderline" (off vocal) (果実的ボーダーライン) – 4:48

=== Kuchibiru Daydream ===
Kuchibiru Daydream (くちびる白昼夢, Kuchibiru Hakuchūmu) is a single by Aki Misato released on August 9, 2006, in Japan by Lantis. The song "Kuchibiru Daydream" was the second opening theme to the anime Strawberry Panic!

==== Track listing ====
1. "Kuchibiru Daydream" (くちびる白昼夢, Kuchibiru Hakuchūmu) – 4:05
2. "true love?" – 3:54
3. "Kuchibiru Daydream" (off vocal) (くちびる白昼夢, Kuchibiru Hakuchūmu) – 4:05
4. "true love?" (off vocal) – 3:54

=== Ichigo Tsumi Monogatari ===
Ichigo Tsumi Monogatari (苺摘み物語) is a single by Mai Nakahara and Ai Shimizu released on August 23, 2006, in Japan by Lantis. The song "Ichigo Tsumi Monogatari" was the second ending theme to the anime Strawberry Panic!

==== Track listing ====
1. "Ichigo Tsumi Monogatari" (苺摘み物語) – 4:21
2. "Venus Panic" – 4:12
3. "Ichigo Tsumi Monogatari" (off vocal) (苺摘み物語) – 4:21
4. "Venus Panic" (off vocal) – 4:12

== Soundtracks ==
=== Anime ===
Strawberry Panic! original soundtrack

Soundtrack album by Yoshihisa Hirano
- Released: September 6, 2006
- Genre: Anime soundtrack
- Label: Lantis

The Strawberry Panic! original soundtrack is the soundtrack to the anime version of Strawberry Panic! first released by Lantis on September 6, 2006.

==== Track listing ====
1. Karei Naru Gakuen (華麗なる学園)
2. Mayoikonda Shoujo (迷い込んだ少女)
3. Uruwashiki Hito (麗しき人)
4. Hirogaru Joukei (広がる情景)
5. Yume no Mainichi (夢の毎日)
6. Koi no Joukei (恋の情景)
7. Kibou (希望)
8. Itsumo no Fuukei (いつもの風景)
9. Kibou, Soshite Tokimeki he (希望、そしてときめきへ)
10. Kanashiki Kako (悲しき過去)
11. Hiren (悲恋)
12. Hitori Setsunaku (ひとり切なく)
13. Unmei (運命)
14. Kinchou (緊張)
15. Utsukushiki Kyougaku (美しき驚愕)
16. Kokoro no Fuukei (心の風景)
17. Kyoukai (教会)
18. Fui ni Semararete... (不意に迫られて...)
19. Tanoshii Gakuen Seikatsu (楽しい学園生活)
20. Hazumu Mainichi (はずむ毎日)
21. Kanjiru Message (感じるメッセージ)
22. Maemuki ni Ikimashou (前向きにいきましょう)
23. Kandou Soshite Mirai he (感動そして未来へ)
24. Hazun da Kimochi (はずんだ気持ち)
25. Kawaii Shigusa (かわいいしぐさ)
26. Kyoufu (恐怖)
27. Shinpi no Mood ga (神秘のムードが)
28. Yokan to Gensou (予感と幻想)
29. Kaori no Theme (花織のテーマ)
30. Miator no Theme (ミアトルのテーマ)
31. Spica no Theme (スピカのテーマ)
32. Lulim no Theme (ル・リムのテーマ)
33. Kedakaki Yuri no (気高き百合の)
34. Hitotsuboshi Noborite (一つ星のぼりて)
35. Little Bird
36. Shoujo Meiro de Tsukamaete (TV size) (少女迷路でつかまえて (TV size))
37. Himitsu Dolls (TV size) (秘密ドールズ (TV size))
38. Kuchibiru Daydream (TV size) (くちびる白昼夢 (TV size))
39. Ichigo Tsumi Monogatari (TV size) (苺摘み物語 (TV size))

=== PlayStation 2 game ===
PlayStation 2 Game Strawberry Panic! Original Sound Track

Soundtrack album
- Released: September 21, 2006
- Genre: Video game soundtrack
- Label: Lantis
- Producer: MediaWorks

PlayStation 2 Game Strawberry Panic! Original Sound Track is the original soundtrack to the PlayStation 2 video game from the Strawberry Panic! series.

==== Track listing ====
1. "Shizuma's Theme" (静馬のテーマ, Shizuma no Tēma)
2. "Nagisa's Theme" (渚砂のテーマ, Nagisa no Tēma)
3. "Tamao's Theme" (玉青のテーマ, Tamao no Tēma)
4. "Chiyo's Theme" (千代,のテーマ, Chiyo no Tēma)
5. "Amane's Theme" (天音のテーマ, Amane no Tēma)
6. "Hikari's Theme" (光莉のテーマ, Hikari no Tēma)
7. "Yaya's Theme" (夜々のテーマ, Yaya no Tēma)
8. "Tsubomi's Theme" (蕾のテーマ, Tsubomi no Tēma)
9. "Kizuna's Theme" (絆奈のテーマKizuna no Tēma)
10. "Chikaru's Theme" (千華留のテーマ, Chikaru no Tēma)
11. "Remon's Theme" (檸檬のテーマ, Remon no Tēma)
12. "Kagome's Theme" (籠女のテーマ, Kagome no Tēma)
13. "St Asraea's Hill" (聖アストラエアの丘, Sei Asutoraea no Oka)
14. "Yuri Yuri scene 1" (百合百合シーンその1, Yuri Yuri Shiin Sono 1)
15. "Yuri Yuri scene 2" (百合百合シーンその2, Yuri Yuri Shiin Sono 2)
16. "Life in the Strawberry Dorms" (いちご舎の生活, Ichigo-sha no Seikatsu)
17. "Sweetest" (Off Vocal Ver)
18. "I Love Only You" (あなただけを愛します, Anata Dake o Aishimasu)
19. "Bonus" (おまけ, Omake)
20. "The Angel and the Devil Ver. 1" (天使と悪魔 Ver. 1, Tenshi to Akuma Ver. 1)
21. "The Angel and the Devil Ver. 2" (天使と悪魔 Ver. 2, Tenshi to Akuma Ver. 2)
22. "Panic☆1" (パニック☆1, Panikku ☆1)
23. "Panic☆2" (パニック☆2, Panikku ☆2)
24. "Sweetest"
  - Vocals: CooRie
25. "I'll be Close to You" (そばにいるよ, Soba ni Iruyo)
  - Vocals: Mai Nakahara

== Drama CDs ==
=== Lyric 1 ===
"Strawberry Panic" Lyric 1 "Miator volume"

Soundtrack album by 13 voice actors from the anime version
- Released: July 26, 2006
- Genre: Drama
- Label: Lantis
- Producer: MediaWorks

"Strawberry Panic" Lyric 1 "Miator volume" is the first drama CD based on the anime version of the series Strawberry Panic! and was first released on July 26, 2006.

==== Track listing ====
1. "Prologue" (プロローグ, Purorōgu)
2. "Sudden Shower" (にわか雨, Niwaka ame)
3. "Shirokunai shitagi" (白くない下着)
4. "Chiyo's feelings" (千代の想い, Chiyo no omoi)
5. "My heart aches.." (胸が･･･痛いよ･･･, Mune ga... itai yo...)
6. "Tamao and Shizuma" (玉青と静馬, Tamao to Shizuma)
7. "Misconception" (誤解, Gokai)
8. "Tamao's Confession" (玉青の告白, Tamao no kokuhaku)
9. "Shizuma on a White Horse" (白馬の静馬, Hakuba no Sizuma)
10. "Beyond the Horizon" (水平線の向こうに, Suiheisen no mukouni)
11. "Cast Comment" (キャストコメント, Kyasuto Komento)
12. "Spica Hen Yokoku" (BONUS TRACK) (スピカ編予告 (BONUS TRACK))

=== Lyric 2 ===
"Strawberry Panic" Lyric 2 "Spica volume"

Soundtrack album by 13 voice actors from the anime version
- Released: October 25, 2006
- Genre: Drama
- Label: Lantis
- Producer: MediaWorks

"Strawberry Panic" Lyric 2 "Spica volume" is the second drama CD based on the anime version of the series Strawberry Panic! and was first released on October 25, 2006.

==== Track listing ====
1. "Prologue" (プロローグ, Purorōgu)
2. "Hikari's diet" (光莉のダイエット, Hikari no daiette)
3. "Like Starbright's Body" (スターブライトの身体のように..., Sutaburaito no karada no youni...)
4. "Sorezore no Omowaku" (それぞれの思惑)
5. "Shintai Sokutei Zenjitu" (身体測定前日)
6. "Unmei no Shintai Sokutei" (運命の身体測定)
7. "Imushitu no Futari" (医務室の二人)
8. "Bathroom" (バスルーム, Basurūmu)
9. "Cast comment" (キャストコメント, Kyasuto Komento)
10. "Lulim Hen Yokoku" (BONUS TRACK) (ル・リム編予告 (BONUS TRACK))

=== Lyric 3 ===
"Strawberry Panic" Lyric 3 "Lulim volume"

Soundtrack album by 13 voice actors from the anime version
- Released: December 6, 2006
- Genre: Drama
- Label: Lantis
- Producer: MediaWorks

"Strawberry Panic" Lyric 3 "Lulim volume" is the third drama CD based on the anime version of the series Strawberry Panic! and was first released on December 6, 2006.

==== Track listing ====
1. "Prologue" (プロローグ, Purorōgu)
2. "The Maid Clothes Operation at the 'Transformation Club'" (『変身部』で、メイド服大作戦!, "Hensin-bu" de, Meidofuku Dai Sakusen)
3. "'Exploration in the Maid Clothes Club' start moving!" (『メイド探検部』、活動開始!, 'Meido Tanken-bu', Katudou Kaishi!)
4. "Etoile in the Greenhouse" (温室のエトワール様, Onshitu no Etowaru-sama)
5. "Omido no Futari" (お御堂の二人)
6. "Public Bathroom in Strawberry Dorms" (いちご舎大浴場, Ichigo-sha Daiyokujyo)
7. "Establishment of the 'Romance club'" (『恋愛部』の発足, "Renai-bu" no Hossoku)
8. "Astrea Hil in Chikaru's memory" (千華留、想い出のアストラエアの丘, Chikaru, Omoide no Asutoraea no Oka)
9. "Ashita, Aeba Wakarunokana?" (明日、会えばわかるのかな?)
10. "Reason for the Tears" (涙の訳, Namida no Wake)
11. "Ending" (エンディング, Endingu)
12. "Cast comment" (キャストコメント, Kyasuto Komento)
13. "Miator Hen Yokoku (BONUS TRACK) (ミアトル編予告 (BONUS TRACK))

=== Voice actors ===
Thirteen of the voice actors from the anime also provided their voices for their respective characters in the drama CD.

- Nagisa Aoi – Mai Nakahara
- Tamao Suzumi – Ai Shimizu
- Shizuma Hanazono – Hitomi Nabatame
- Miyuki Rokujō – Junko Noda
- Chiyo Tsukidate – Chiwa Saitō
- Hikari Konohana – Miyu Matsuki
- Amane Ōtori – Yuko Kaida
- Yaya Nanto – Natsuko Kuwatani
- Tsubomi Okuwaka – Sakura Nogawa
- Chikaru Minamoto – Saki Nakajima
- Kizuna Hyūga – Ai Shimizu
- Remon Natsume – Ui Miyazaki
- Kagome Byakudan – Yukari Fukui

== Web radio CDs ==
=== Volume 1 ===
Mai & Ai no Dengeki G's Radio Strawberry Panic! ~Oneesama to Ichigo Sōdō~ Kyun Kyun Fill

Studio album by Mai Nakahara and Ai Shimizu
- Released: March 8, 2006
- Genre: Radio drama
- Label: Lantis
- Producer: MediaWorks

The first web radio album entitled Mai & Ai no Dengeki G's Radio Strawberry Panic! ~Oneesama to Ichigo Sōdō~ Kyun Kyun Fill (麻衣&愛の電撃G'sラジオ ストロベリー・パニック!~お姉様といちごそうどう~ Kyun Kyun Fill) was released on March 8, 2006, by Lantis.

==== Track listing ====
1. "Kyun Kyun Frill" (きゅんきゅんフリル (Vocal:麻衣&愛))
2. "Kyun Kyun Frill" (きゅんきゅんフリル (Electronica Rose MIX))
3. "Kyun Kyun Frill" (きゅんきゅんフリル(instrumental))
4. "Yorinuki Ane Senryu 'Yume no tuduki to oneesama'" (よりぬき姉川柳「夢のつづきとお姉様」)
5. "Yorinuki Ane Senryu 'Yubisaki no tawamure to oneesama'" (よりぬき姉川柳「指先の戯れとお姉様」)
6. "Yorinuki Ane Senryu 'Koukan nikki to oneesama'" (よりぬき姉川柳「交換日記とお姉様」)
7. "Yorinuki Ane Senryu 'Mekakushi sarete to oneesama'" (よりぬき姉川柳「目隠しされてとお姉様」)
8. "Yorinuki Ane Senryu 'Koraeta toiki to oneesama'" (よりぬき姉川柳「怺えた吐息とお姉様」)
9. "Yorinuki Ane Senryu 'Seiya no amagami to oneesama'" (よりぬき姉川柳「聖夜の甘噛みとお姉様」)
10. "Yorinuki Ane Senryu 'Kotatsu no shita de oneesama'" (よりぬき姉川柳「炬燵の下でお姉様」)
11. "Yorinuki Ane Senryu 'Hayadumi ichigo to oneesama'" (よりぬき姉川柳「早摘み苺とお姉様」)
12. "Yorinuki Ane Senryu 'Mune ga tukaete oneesama'" (よりぬき姉川柳「胸が痞えてお姉様」)
13. "Yorinuki Ane Senryu 'Namete amaete oneesama'" (よりぬき姉川柳「舐めて甘えてお姉様」)

=== Volume 2 ===
Mai & Ai no Dengeki G's Radio Strawberry Panic! ~Oneesama to Ichigo Sōdō~ ~Shiroyuri no Ran~

Studio album by Mai Nakahara and Ai Shimizu
- Released: July 5, 2006
- Genre: Radio drama
- Label: Lantis
- Producer: MediaWorks

The second web radio album entitled Mai & Ai no Dengeki G's Radio Strawberry Panic! ~Oneesama to Ichigo Sōdō~ ~Shiroyuri no Ran~ (麻衣&愛の電撃G'sラジオ ストロベリー・パニック!~お姉様といちごそうどう~ ~白百合の乱~) was released on July 5, 2006, by Lantis.

==== Track listing ====
1. 序章 ~それはきっと白百合の誘惑にございましょう~
2. 第1章 ~夏子の奥~
3. 姉川柳 ~清き花粉はお姉さま~
4. 姉メロミックス ~桑谷夏子お姉様とともに~
5. 第2章 ~千和の奥~
6. 姉川柳 ~過ぎ行く如月、姉ごよみ~
7. 姉メロミックス ~斎藤千和お姉様とともに~
8. 第3章 ~未祐の奥~
9. 姉川柳 ~熟れて膨れてお姉さま~
10. 姉メロミックス ~松来未祐お姉様とともに~
11. 第4章 ~さくらの奥~
12. 姉川柳 ~心擽るお姉さま~
13. 姉メロミックス ~野川さくらお姉様とともに~
14. 終章 ~つわものどもが夢のあとでございます~
15. 姉川柳 ~蕾に触れてお姉さま~
16. 姉川柳 ~微香に酔ってお姉さま~
17. 姉川柳 ~バスルームは姉の香り~
18. 姉川柳 ~お姉さまのグリンピース~
19. 姉川柳 ~雨音はお姉さまの調べ~
20. 入学試験の諸注意、及び、入学式の諸注意

=== Volume 3 ===
Mai & Ai no Dengeki G's Radio Strawberry Panic! ~Oneesama to Ichigo Sōdō~ Sotsugyo ~Maichiru Sakura wa Yuri no Kaori~

Studio album by Mai Nakahara and Ai Shimizu
- Released: January 11, 2007
- Genre: Radio drama
- Label: Lantis
- Producer: MediaWorks

The third web radio album entitled Mai & Ai no Dengeki G's Radio Strawberry Panic! ~Oneesama to Ichigo Sōdō~ (麻衣&愛の電撃G'sラジオ ストロベリー・パニック!~お姉様といちごそうどう~) was released on January 11, 2007, by Lantis.

==== Track listing ====
1. 開会の辞
2. 卒業証書授与 という名の姉川柳
3. 卒業生の言葉 ~松来未祐
4. 卒業生の言葉 ~木下紗華
5. 卒業生の言葉 ~後藤沙緒里
6. 卒業生の言葉 ~中島沙樹
7. 卒業生の言葉 ~生天目仁美
8. 在校生送辞 という名の姉川柳
9. 卒業生答辞(フリートーク)
10. 卒業生退場曲(姉メロ)「ドレープ」
11. 卒業生退場曲(姉メロ)「言うに事欠いて」
12. 卒業生退場曲(姉メロ)「あふれ」
13. 卒業生退場曲(姉メロ)「焦燥」
14. 卒業生退場曲(姉メロ)「そばにいて」
15. 卒業生退場曲(姉メロ)「秘密の染み」
16. 卒業生退場曲(姉メロ)「姉と姉」
17. 卒業生退場曲(姉メロ)「振り向き様」
18. 卒業生退場曲(姉メロ)「覚悟」
19. 卒業生退場曲(姉メロ)「愛の耳鳴り」
20. 特選姉川柳「濡れて触れたら、お姉様」
21. 特選姉川柳「火照る日焼けと、お姉様」
22. 特選姉川柳「拭き取る雫と、お姉様」
23. 特選姉川柳「浴衣で愛でて、お姉様」
24. 特選姉川柳「祭囃子と、お姉様」
25. 特選姉川柳「子猫の声で、お姉様」
26. 特選姉川柳「満月の夜は、お姉様」
27. 特選姉川柳「暖められて、お姉様」
28. 特選姉川柳「至近距離です、お姉様」
29. 特選姉川柳「炬燵の中で、お姉様」
30. 合同文化祭諸注意
31. 少女迷路でつかまえて (Mellow Berry Ballad)
