= Ai Shimizu =

Japanese voice actress and professional wrestler

- 清水 愛
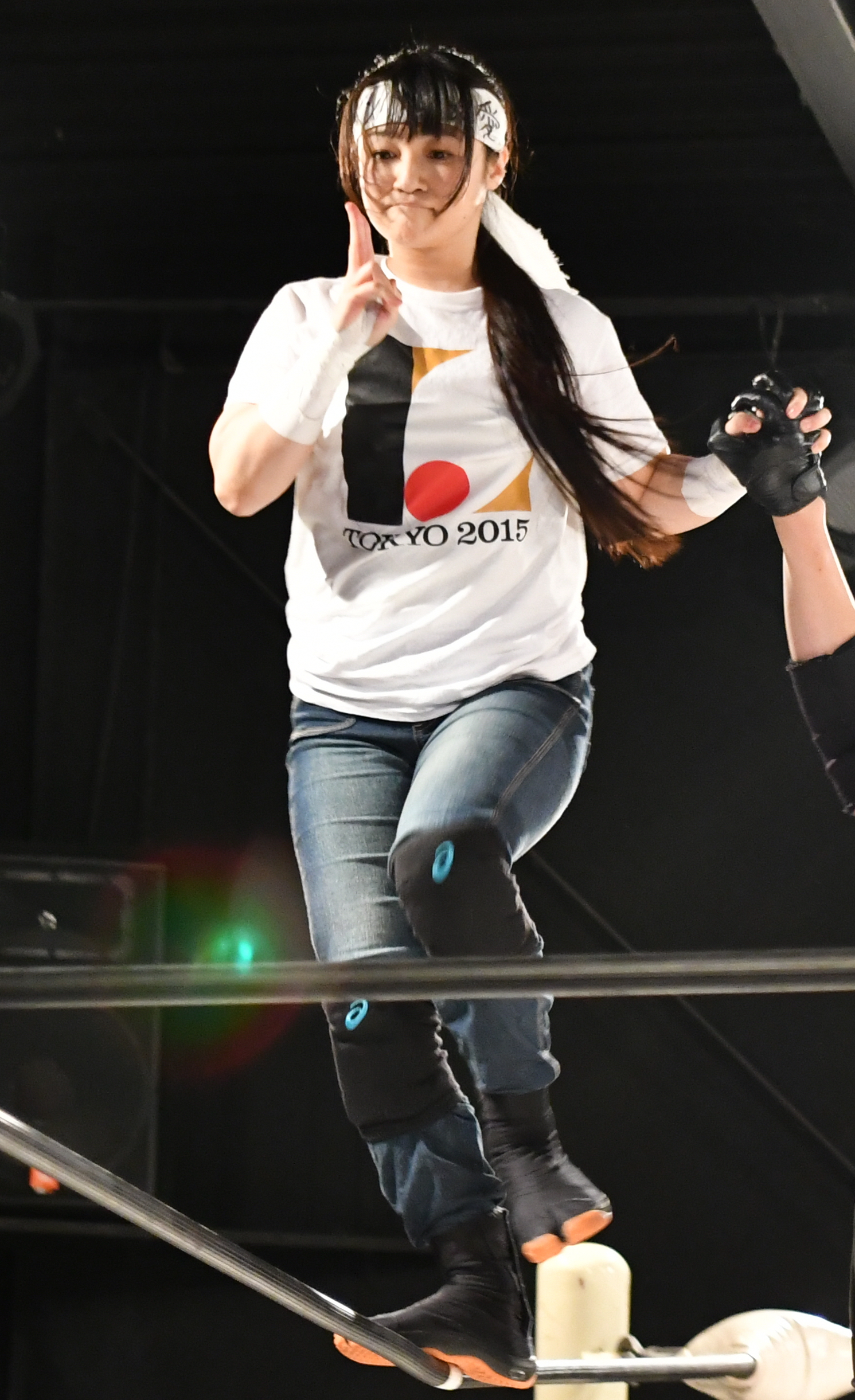
- Shimizu in June 2016
- Born: March 26, 1981 (age 45); Tokyo, Japan
- Status: Married
- Occupations: Voice actress, singer, wrestler
- Years active: 2001–present
- Spouse: Maik Inoue (m. 2016)

Ai Shimizu (清水 愛, Shimizu Ai; born March 26, 1981) is a Japanese voice actress and professional wrestler. She has a career as a singer, signed to Lantis. She has released 14 singles (including joint and character singles) and four albums. She covered Yumi Matsutoya's "Toki o Kakeru Shōjo" as the B-side of her first single "Angel Fish" in 2003. She is known to have a close relationship with Mai Nakahara, having collaborated in eight anime where most of the characters they voiced in together had close connections: DearS, Kage Kara Mamoru!, My-HiME, My-Otome, Please Twins!, Sola, Strawberry Panic! and the Lucky Star drama CD. Shimizu has worked sporadic professional wrestling matches since December 2013.

== Voice roles ==
=== Anime television series ===
==== 2001 ====
- Parappa The Rapper, Baby Miran
- Mahoromatic, Minawa Andou

==== 2002 ====
- Heat Guy J, Monica Gabriel
- Mahoromatic:Something More Beautiful, Minawa Andou
- Rizelmine, Kurumi
- Shrine of the Morning Mist, Yuzu Hieda

==== 2003 ====
- Croket!, Drop
- Mahoromatic:Summer Special, Minawa Andou
- Nurse Witch Komugi, Posokichi
- Please Twins!, Karen Onodera
- Raimuiro Senkitan, Momen Sanada, Theme Song Performance
- Wandaba Style, Kiku No. 8
- Yami to Bōshi to Hon no Tabibito, Hatsumi Azuma, Kogechibi

==== 2004 ====
- DearS, Ren
- Girls Bravo, Hakana
- Magical Girl Lyrical Nanoha, Suzuka Tsukimura
- My-HiME, Mikoto Minagi
- This Ugly Yet Beautiful World, Akari
- W Wish, Senna Tōno

==== 2005 ====
- Absolute Boy, Shione Unno
- Zettai Seigi Love Pheromone, Aimi Yoshizumi
- Fushigiboshi no Futagohime, Puppet
- He Is My Master, Mitsuki Sawatari
- Hell Girl, Ryōko Takamura
- Magical Girl Lyrical Nanoha A's, Suzuka Tsukimura
- MÄR, Snow, Koyuki
- My-Otome, Mikoto Minagi
- Oku-sama wa Mahō Shōjo: Bewitched Agnes, Sayaka Kurenai

==== 2006 ====
- D.Gray-man, Road Kamelot
- Gift: Under the Rainbow, Riko Fukamine
- High School Girls, Momoka Suzuki
- Kage Kara Mamoru!, Yamame Hattori
- Kagihime Monogatari Eikyū Alice Rondo, Arisu Arisugawa
- Mamoru-kun ni Megami no Shukufuku o!, Itsumi Yoshimura
- Rakugo Tennyo Oyui, Suzu Koishikawa
- Shinigami no Ballad, Daniel
- Strawberry Panic!, Tamao Suzumi, Kizuna Hyūga

==== 2007 ====
- Ayakashi, Pam Werne Asakura
- El Cazador de la Bruja, Ellis
- Kenkō Zenrakei Suieibu Umishō, Maki Ikuta
- Princess Resurrection, Sherwood
- Sola, Koyori Ishizuki

==== 2008 ====
- Akiba-chan, Akiba-chan
- Hatenkō Yūgi, Lalawell (ep 5–6)
- Kyōran Kazoku Nikki, Tsubaki Ryuukotsuji (ep 7)
- Zettai Karen Children, Hatsune Inugami

==== 2009 ====
- Fight Ippatsu! Jūden-chan!!, Kuran Shunt
- Mahoromatic: Tadaima Okaeri, Minawa Andou
- Saki, Hajime Kunihiro
- Seitokai no Ichizon, Elise Toudou
- Tears to Tiara, Ermin

==== 2010 ====
- Jewelpet Twinkle☆, Sango
- The Qwaser of Stigmata, Elizabeth (Lizzie)

==== 2011 ====
- Horizon in the Middle of Nowhere, Mitsuki Sanyou
- Hoshizora e Kakaru Hashi, Madoka Komoto
- Kore wa Zombie Desu ka?, Ariel/Dai-sensei
- Jewelpet Sunshine, Sango, Kaede Kikuchi
- The Qwaser of Stigmata II, Elizabeth (Lizzie)

==== 2012 ====
- Kore wa Zombie Desu ka? of the Dead, Ariel/Dai-sensei

==== 2013 ====
- High School DxD New, Serafall Leviathan
- Kami Nomi zo Shiru Sekai, Akari Kurakawa/Rimyuel

==== 2014 ====
- The Kawai Complex Guide to Manors and Hostel Behavior, Chinatsu
- The Fruit of the Grisaia, Sachi Komine

==== 2015 ====
- High School DxD BorN, Serafall Leviathan

==== 2016 ====
- Aokana: Four Rhythm Across the Blue, Minamo Shirase

=== Original video animations ===
- Cosplay Complex (2002), Athena Imai
- Generation of Chaos III ~Seal of Time~ (2003), Teefa
- Please Twins!: The Summer Never Ends (2004), Karen Onodera
- Psychic Academy (2002 ONA), Kyaru
- Raimuiro Senkitan: The South Island Dream Romantic Adventure (2004), Momen Sanada, Theme Song Performance
- Rune Factory Oceans, Sonia
- Strawberry 100% (2005), Chinami Hashimoto

=== Video games ===
- January 2005: Otome wa Boku ni Koishiteru: Futari no Elder, Yū Kashiwagi
- May 2005: Gift: prism, Riko Fukamine
- March 2008: 12Riven, Chisato Inose
- September 2009: Tears to Tiara: Kakan no Daichi, Ermin
- March 2010: Amatu Misora ni!: Kumo no Hatate ni, Miyu Kanzaki
- February 2011: Grisaia no Kajitsu, Sachi Komine
- February 2012: Hatsuyuki Sakura, Sakura Tamaki
- March 2012: Let's Fish! Hooked On, herself
- March 2012: Root Double: Before Crime * After Days, Subject N
- June 2015: Fire Emblem if, Charlotte
- March 2016: NightCry, Connie
- May 2017: Fire Emblem Heroes, Charlotte

=== Drama CDs ===
- Junk Force, Mill
- Walkure Romanze: Shōjo Kishi Monogatari, Mio Kisaki

== Singles and albums ==
=== Singles ===
- "Moete Koso Cosplay" (萌えてこそ・コスプレ) (May 22, 2002, Lantis)
- "Iku yo? Lucky Wave" (行くよ? Lucky Wave) (November 27, 2003, Lantis) with Mai Nakahara, ranked 51st in Oricon charts
- "Parade" (July 22, 2004, Lantis) with Mai Nakahara & Saeko Chiba, ranked 188th in Oricon charts
- "Kokoro no Tsurugi" (ココロの剣) (September 23, 2004, Lantis)
- "Rasen no Prologue" (螺旋のプロローグ) (November 25, 2004, Lantis) ranked 128th in Oricon charts
- "Hariyume Haikyo" (針夢廃墟) (February 24, 2005, Lantis) ranked 129th in Oricon charts
- "Kioku Baraen" (記憶薔薇園) (February 22, 2006, Lantis) ranked 64th in Oricon charts
- "Himitsu Dolls" (秘密ドールズ) (Mai 26, 2006, Lantis) ranked 42nd in Oricon charts
- "Ichigo Tsumi Monogatari" (苺摘み物語) (August 23, 2006, Lantis) ranked 43rd in Oricon charts
- "Kakusei Bisque Doll" (覚醒ビスクドール) (April 25, 2007, Lantis) ranked 107th in Oricon charts
- "Koisuru Ryokō Shōjo" (恋する旅行少女) (December 21, 2007, Lantis) ranked 136th in Oricon charts
- "Character Song Vol. 12 Aoba & Tsubasa Hiraizumi" (キャラクターソング Vol.12 平泉あおば&つばさ) (March 26, 2008, Lantis) ranked 159th in Oricon charts
- "Chimeric voice" (September 9, 2009, Lantis)
- "Tokei to Mahō no Biscuit" (時計と魔法のビスケット) (July 22, 2010, Lantis)

=== Albums ===
- Hatsuga Jōken M (発芽条件M) (April 27, 2005, Lantis) ranked 115th in Oricon charts
- Hakoiri Zakuro Hime (箱入り柘榴姫) (August 24, 2005, Lantis)
- Chronicle (December 21, 2006, Lantis) with Mai Nakahara, ranked 101st in Oricon charts
- Nuova Storia (September 10, 2008, Lantis) ranked 141st in Oricon charts

== Championships and accomplishments ==
- Ice Ribbon
  - Triangle Ribbon Championship (1 time)
