= Strawberry Panic! =

Japanese light novel, manga and anime series

- Title page of Strawberry Panic! from Dengeki G's Magazine, published by MediaWorks, showing the twelve original characters
- Genre: Romance, yuri
- Light novel
- Written by: Sakurako Kimino
- Illustrated by: Chitose Maki
- Published by: MediaWorks
- Magazine: Dengeki G's Magazine
- Original run: December 30, 2003 – July 30, 2005
- Volumes: 18 (magazine issues)
- Manga
- Written by: Sakurako Kimino
- Illustrated by: Namuchi Takumi
- Published by: MediaWorks
- English publisher: NA: Seven Seas Entertainment
- Magazine: Dengeki G's Magazine
- Original run: September 30, 2005 – February 28, 2007
- Volumes: 2
- Light novel
- Written by: Sakurako Kimino
- Illustrated by: Namuchi Takumi
- Published by: MediaWorks
- English publisher: NA: Seven Seas Entertainment
- Imprint: Dengeki Bunko
- Original run: March 10, 2006 – December 10, 2006
- Volumes: 3
- Anime television series
- Directed by: Masayuki Sakoi
- Produced by: Hajime Maruyama; Kouji Saitou; Akio Sakai; Naohiro Tafu; Kazuya Watanabe; Tsuyoshi Hamamatsu
- Written by: Tatsuhiko Urahata
- Music by: Yoshihisa Hirano
- Studio: Madhouse (Note: Production assistance (制作協力) for all episodes provided by Imagin.)
- Licensed by: NA: Media Blasters
- Original network: Chiba TV, Kids Station, TV Aichi, TV Osaka
- English network: US: Toku
- Original run: April 3, 2006 – September 25, 2006
- Episodes: 26
- Video game

Strawberry Panic! Girls' School in Fullbloom
- Developer: MediaWorks
- Publisher: MediaWorks
- Genre: Visual novel
- Platform: PlayStation 2
- Released: August 24, 2006
- icon

Strawberry Panic! is a series of Japanese illustrated short stories written by Sakurako Kimino, which focus on a group of teenage girls attending three affiliated all-girl schools on Astraea Hill. A common theme throughout the stories is the intimate lesbian relationships between the characters. The original artist was Chitose Maki, who was succeeded by Namuchi Takumi when production of the manga and light novels began.

Following Strawberry Panic!'s first run in Dengeki G's Magazine it was six months before results began to indicate that the series was a success, and that its fans were growing in number; the manga and light novels which followed were a reflection of its popularity. The series became sufficiently popular for Seven Seas Entertainment to license the manga series and light novels for English language distribution. Strawberry Panic! was one of the debut titles on the company's light novel and yuri manga production lines. An anime television series was produced in 2006 by Madhouse and is licensed by Media Blasters. A visual novel was produced in 2006 by MediaWorks for the PlayStation 2.

There is a slight difference in the title of the series between media and national affiliation. The original short stories, manga, light novels, and video game used the exclamation mark in the title; the anime excluded it. When the manga and light novel series were licensed for English language distribution, Seven Seas Entertainment did not use the exclamation mark in the title. The logo for Strawberry Panic! has changed four times. The subtitle "Girls' School in Fullbloom" was added during the short stories stage, and later appeared on the Japanese covers of the light novels, manga, and video game version, but was excluded from the anime adaptation and the English covers of the light novels and manga.

== Plot ==
Aerial view of Astraea Hill. Locations include: Strawberry Dorms (top), Lulim (left), Miator (bottom), church and library (center), and Spica (right).

=== Setting ===
The setting for Strawberry Panic! is Astraea Hill (アストラエアの丘, Asutoraea no Oka), a very large hilltop where the three affiliated schools of Miator, Spica and Lulim, are located. Each school has its own student council, which governs the matters of each respective school. Periodically the three student councils, along with the Etoiles, meet in the Astraea Joint Student Council. The Astraea Hill school system employs the Scottish system of grade numbering. Students are ranged from grades one through six, the equivalent of the three years of junior-high and high school in Japan, and seventh through twelfth grade in North America.

The hill is known as a sacred area which no men are allowed to enter. A prominent feature is a very large Catholic church in the center of the hill near a small lake; the church can be seen from a long distance away. There is a horse ranch at Spica. The students may go and study for their classes at a library on the lake's shore. Although only implied in the anime, the manga explains that the library building has another name, "The Secret Garden". It is well known on campus as a rendezvous for secret lovers.

Students living on campus occupy a dormitory referred to as the "Strawberry Dorms" (いちご舎, Ichigo Sha; lit. "Strawberry House"), although its correct name is Astraea Dormitory, named after Astraea Hill. The building is a triangular shape, allowing for the segregation of students from the three schools; each section is about the same size. It was built about 100 years before the story begins, around the same time that Miator was established, for students whose homes are far away. Each student is assigned a roommate in their year until graduation. If there is an odd number of students enrolled in a given year, one of the new students must live alone until a student in their year transfers into their school.

The building's name is based on its similarity to the cross-section of a strawberry viewed from above. When Strawberry Panic! was initially created, the three schools were arranged in a triangle, with the Strawberry Dorms in the center, and the dormitory was not a single building but three separate dormitories also arranged in a triangle around a central courtyard.

=== Story ===
The plot of Strawberry Panic! revolves around the lives of the adolescents who attend one of three affiliated all-girl schools which share a campus and dormitories. The schools are: St. Miator's Girls' Academy, St. Spica's Girls' Institute, and St. Lulim's Girls' School. There are twelve characters the story revolves around, four at each school. The story's main character is Nagisa Aoi, a young girl entering her fourth year at St. Miator after being transferred from another school. On first entering the campus grounds, she is overcome with joy by the overall appearance of the surrounding area, but her joy is soon turned to sorrow as she accidentally stumbles down a hill, causing her to be lost and disoriented. While walking around the grounds trying to work out where she is, Nagisa comes across an older student named Shizuma Hanazono, who happens to be Astraea Hill's Etoile, a very important person who acts as a representative between the different schools and has specific duties that she must fulfill. Nagisa is instantly overcome by Shizuma's beauty, and after Shizuma kisses her on the forehead, Nagisa loses consciousness and awakens in the school's infirmary. In an adjacent chair is another girl of the same age, Tamao Suzumi, who informs her that they are to be roommates in the dormitory.

In the ensuing story, Nagisa is introduced to other students from each of the three schools; some she admires, some she is intimidated by, and some are merely friends encountered while attending St. Miator. The series encompasses the relationships the characters build with each other, climaxing whenever two of the characters start dating. The central focuses of Strawberry Panic! are the lesbian relationships and friendships between the girls from the three schools and the Etoile position and competition; the anime is more relationship-heavy while the manga is more competition-heavy. The story of what happens to the other half of St. Miator's Etoile pairing is explored in the latter portion of the anime. Depending on the media type, the depiction of the relationships between the girls is variously presented, with more explicit fan service – appealing visuals of the girls in provocative situations – in the anime adaptation than in the manga or light novels. A hint of astronomical star imagery is seen throughout the series, as well as minor Catholic religious undertones including a St. Mary statue on campus and a large Catholic church in the center of Astraea Hill.

=== Main characters and schools ===
At each of the three schools, there are four main characters, who comprise the original twelve characters created for the short stories when the series began. Only those twelve appear in the subsequently adapted visual novel version. Other characters were introduced in the manga and light novel versions to create plotlines and conflict, and these additional characters are also featured in the anime adaptation.

St. Miator's Girls' Academy
St. Miator's Girls' Academy (聖ミアトル女学園, Sei Miatoru Jogakuen), the oldest of the three schools which has a history of over 100 years, is known for upholding old traditions. It was founded on a monastery and is seen as the school for "brides", reinforced by the existence of extracurricular classes including tea ceremony, flower arrangement, and Japanese dancing. It is not unusual for students to be engaged before graduation. The school uniform is a long black dress, designed in the Gothic Lolita fashion. At Miator, the class names are associated with objects from nature, such as moon (月, tsuki), flower (花, hana) and snow (雪, yuki). In the Strawberry Dorms, there is a concept called the room temp system for students from Miator. Every underclassman entering the dormitories, if they are chosen to serve the upperclassman as room temps, perform maid duties, which include cleaning the room of the students they are assigned to serve.

Nagisa Aoi is the main character of the story. She is a cheerful girl who finds pleasure in making new friends, which she finds easy to do because of her open personality and sociable attitude. The first person she meets at Miator is Shizuma Hanazono, a mysterious upperclassman and the Etoile as the story begins, which gives Miator significant influence. Nagisa at first finds that she is strangely affected when in the presence of Shizuma, who in turn is extremely interested in Nagisa in both the manga and the anime. The next girl she meets is Tamao Suzumi, who becomes her close friend and roommate. Tamao is well regarded among her fellow Miator students; among the first-years, she is seen as a viable Etoile candidate. She expresses some light and playful interest in Nagisa, but it is much less overt than Shizuma's interest and is very downplayed in the manga. The last main character from Miator is Chiyo Tsukidate, a timid first year student who is employed as the room temp for Nagisa and Tamao; in the anime, she deeply admires Nagisa.

St. Spica's Girls' Institute
St. Spica's Girls' Institute (聖スピカ女学院, Sei Supika Jogakuin) has the white colored buildings and uniforms, and was built after Miator. The school prides itself in advancing the independence of women who play a role in improving society. It is well known for its culture and the accomplishments of its sports program compared to the other two schools. Spica has what is known as the St. Spica Choir, or the "Saintly Chorus," which consists of students from Spica who perform at special events and even concerts for students at Astraea Hill. At Spica, the class names are numbers in French, such as un (one), deux (two), and trois (three). Spica and Miator compete with each other quite aggressively, which often ends in dispute when students from these two schools get together.

Hikari Konohana, a shy and quiet girl, is the main focus among the main characters who attend Spica. The next Spica character is Yaya Nanto, a rebellious girl who is Hikari's best friend and roommate in the dormitory. In the anime, she is very much enamored with Hikari, but Hikari sees her as a friend; in the manga, Yaya is not a prominent character. Both she and Hikari are members of the St. Spica Choir. Hikari meets an older girl named Amane Ohtori early on in the story who is seen much like a prince from a fairy tale by other Spica students due to often riding a white horse named Star Bright. Amane is admired by many of the students from Spica as well as students from the other two schools, although she does not enjoy the attention. In the anime, Hikari admires her deeply, and she and Amane have mutual interest in each other. The final girl from Spica is Tsubomi Okuwaka, a young first year student who acts maturely for her age and gets on Yaya's nerves. She too is in the St. Spica Choir, although Hikari was her main motivation for joining. In the anime, her interest in Hikari seems to purely be one of friendship; in the manga, she, like Yaya, is not a prominent character. Tsubomi once remarked that Yaya was more skilled than Hikari at singing in the choir.

St. Lulim's Girls' School
St. Lulim's Girls' School (聖ル・リム女学校, Sei Ru Rimu Jogakkō) (originally Le Lim) is the newest of the three schools, and has pink colored buildings and uniforms. Its uniform is modeled after a traditional Japanese school uniform style. At Lulim, the class names are the letters from the Latin alphabet: A, B, C, etc. Students at St. Lulim's are traditionally free and relaxed, and are rarely seen fighting. The students enjoy a lot of freedom in terms of activities, or the clubs they are allowed to form. In effect, there are a wide range of clubs at St. Lulim's ranging from dancing, to cooking, to anything else a group of at least three people can think up.

Of the three schools, St. Lulim has the least emphasis on romance between characters, although the Lulim characters are typically found together. The leader of their friendly group is Chikaru Minamoto, the student council president of Lulim, and a born leader. She has a friendly and supportive personality which she often uses to offer advice or simply a shoulder to cry on. The other three girls include Kizuna Hyūga, a very outgoing and excitable girl who enjoys following Chikaru's decisions, finding fun in doing so. She is very expressive in her actions and words, not wasting a chance to introduce herself to anyone new. Her close friend is Remon Natsume, who is much like Kizuna in personality, but is not as accident-prone as her. Of the pair, Kizuna is the more talkative; Remon often agrees with her companion and will offer up an opinion when need be. Lastly, there is Kagome Byakudan, the youngest of the group, who is typically accompanied by her stuffed bear Percival (パーシバル, Pāshibaru) which she often talks to as if it were alive. Although she does not talk or express her emotions much, she has a heightened perception of others' emotions and can tell when those around her are distraught or in emotional pain.

=== Etoile system ===
Etoile (エトワール, Etowāru) is a French word meaning star. The Etoile system of Astraea Hill is employed as the internal politics between the schools and governs school operations. Little is shown as to the influence the teachers and sisters have on the inter-school politics. The system is designed for two Etoiles to be instated at the same time in order to work as a team. In the anime, Shizuma Hanazono is the sole Etoile, the other Etoile having died, which is explained in the latter part of the story. The two Etoiles are seen as figureheads for Astraea Hill. Although Astraea has three schools, both Etoiles must come from the same school. They have certain specific duties, such as greeting new students arriving at Astraea Hill, participating in important school events, and serving as mediator between disputes in student council meetings of the three schools, among others. They are given a private greenhouse in which to grow flowers for use during school events.

The Etoiles are elected after going through what is known as The Etoile Election (エトワール選, Etowāru-sen), which consists of three competitions in the light novels and the manga versions. The higher scoring pairs from the first two competitions carry on to the third competition, and the pair that wins the third competition becomes the Etoile Couple. In the anime, the competition aspect of the story is toned down. Still, it facilitates the culmination of the story in the finale, and thus serves an important purpose. Once the winners have been named, a special ceremony marks the end of the election, at which the president of the student council from the school that won the election presents two necklaces for the winners to wear during their tenure as Etoiles. They are both identical except for the colors of the pendants: one is red, the other is blue. The older student receives the blue pendant and the younger of the two is given the red pendant.

== Production ==
The first short story from the reader participation project featuring Nagisa and Shizuma as the first couple

Since the first issue of ASCII Media Works' Dengeki G's Magazine was published, the editors of the magazine have hosted reader participation games whose outcome is directly influenced by the people who read the magazine. Strawberry Panic!'s origin was in the October 2003 issue of Dengeki G's Magazine where it was announced after the ending of Sakurako Kimino's previous work Sister Princess that a new reader participation project would start the following month. At that time popular Girls Love media like Maria-sama ga Miteru were largely published in outlets with a majority female audience like Shueisha's Cobalt Bunko. To start a new audience-driven project on G's which had a 90% male readership was described as "very ambitious" by the editors.

In the November 2003 issue, the first batch of characters from St. Miator were introduced (Nagisa, Shizuma, Tamao, and Chiyo) and it was revealed how readers could participate in the project. The initial system had the three main girls of Nagisa, Hikari, and Kizuna (given without surnames) who were sisters and at the same time younger sisters of the readers of the magazine, effectively putting the reader in the position of the elder brother. Each girl entered her respective school and became the main character of that school. It was explained that the coupling of the main characters could be to an upperclassman, a classmate, or an underclassman, but had to stay within the school they attended. For example, Nagisa, who attended Miator could not be coupled with another character from either Spica or Lulim at first. Playing the role of the elder brother, the reader gave advice to the younger sisters who were bewildered by their new lives at each of the schools. Thus, the readers had the ability to influence the coupling formations which would later be written by Kimino as short stories serialized in Dengeki G's Magazine.

In December 2003, the characters from Spica (Hikari, Amane, Yaya, and Tsubomi) and Lulim (Kizuna, Chikaru, Remon, and Kagome) were introduced and in the January 2004 issue the first illustrations of the three schools and the Strawberry Dorms were published, drawn by Chitose Maki; the reader participation game began in this issue. Polls were posted in the January 2004 issue where the readers could vote on how the story would start and progress in the following months. Before the votes were counted, the first three short stories were written and published in the February 2004 issue of Dengeki G's Magazine. Each story featured an illustration of the two girls who were the couple paired in each respective story.

When the results of the polls were printed in the March 2004 issue, the rules of the game had been changed from the original concept, showing that readers wanted to focus on the relationships between the girls, and in this respect, the readers could vote on who they wanted to be coupled together. The number of votes for this first round were less than 2000. Noting this, the editorial staff lifted the restriction on only coupling within the same school, along with the restriction of only allowing the three main girls of Nagisa, Hikari, and Kizuna to couple. This resulted in a total of 66 different possibilities between the twelve characters in the series. In this issue, it was explained that four events were planned for the stories that followed: Easter, Athletic Carnival, Cultural Festival, and Christmas Bazaar. The "Etoile" title was born in this issue, which was initially used to crown the best couple voted first by the readers in each of the four events to follow. These events were going to be carried out by the three schools in cooperation. It became such that the planning of the schools resulted in them in a triangle position, having the dormitories at the center. The reader's position as the elder brother was canceled in this issue, and the game became a simple popularity vote for coupling. Due to this new system, Nagisa, Hikari, and Kizuna ceased to be sisters; surnames were later added to clarify this. After the first story arc of the short stories concluded, it was shown that the number of votes had increased sharply due to the new voting mechanisms. The Etoile voting was announced in the July 2004 issue to take place every month as opposed to every two months which had been the case beforehand. The deadline for voting was shifted to the middle of every month, and online voting was introduced. In September 2004, the voting for the next Etoile was shifted to be online-only; the voting for the Dormitory Panic arc became mail voting only.

The reader participation game ended after ten rounds of voting in the February 2005 issue of Dengeki G's Magazine where it was announced that the series would be continued in other forms, such as the light novels and manga that followed. The original short stories and the poll results of the reader participation game were used as a basis for subsequent releases of Strawberry Panic!.

== Media ==
=== Short stories ===
The first results of the polls from the reader participation project appeared in the form of the first three short stories which resulted from direct fan involvement in the March 2004 issue of Dengeki G's Magazine. The stories were written by Sakurako Kimino and illustrated by Chitose Maki. Over the following months, the stories continued, producing the first story arc named the Etoile Chapter (エトワール編, Etowāru-hen) containing eighteen stories which ran between March and July 2004. Due to the concerns that there was not enough time between the Athletic Festival (an early summer event) and the Cultural Festival (an autumn event), the second, and last, story arc named the Dormitory Panic Chapter (寄宿舎パニック編, Kishukusha Panikku-hen) containing seven stories began the next month, running between August 2004 and January 2005. The second arc's stories, which were longer than the earlier pieces, involved taking one of the three main characters, performing coupling for them with one of the other eleven girls and presenting them in various situations. None of the original stories were ever published again in bound volumes. The stories themselves were more or less vignettes, in which each gave a brief glimpse into what was referred to as a "yuri coupling".

Between May and September 2005, a revised series of the short stories was produced; once per month, five more supplementary short stories were published during this time period, each of which was longer than any of the previous pieces. Although each individual story had its own title, the stories were under the collective title of "The Girls, who art in heaven". After the ending of this short compilation in September 2005, it was decided that the original illustrator, Chitose Maki, would be replaced by Namuchi Takumi for future Strawberry Panic! projects.

=== Internet radio show ===
Between November 2005 and December 2006, Lantis Web Radio hosted a radio show entitled Mai & Ai no Dengeki G's Radio Strawberry Panic!: Oneesama to Ichigo Sōdō (麻衣&愛の電撃G’sラジオ ストロベリー・パニック!~お姉様といちごそうどう~). The show was hosted by Mai Nakahara, who voiced Nagisa Aoi in the anime edition, and Ai Shimizu, who voiced both Tamao Suzumi and Kizuna Hyūga in the anime. The show contained sixty-one episodes, which were divided between three CDs; the first went on sale on March 8, 2006. The other two releases came out on July 5, 2006, and January 11, 2007, in Japan. The radio show included nine guests who had played other voice acting roles in the anime version, and Rino, singer of the opening theme "Sweetest" in the PlayStation 2 game version.

=== Manga ===
The Strawberry Panic! manga, written by Sakurako Kimino and illustrated by Namuchi Takumi, was serialized in Dengeki G's Magazine between September 30, 2005, and February 28, 2007, with a new chapter released once a month. Two bound volumes have been published in Japan under MediaWorks' Dengeki Comics label. The first went on sale on March 27, 2006, featuring Nagisa and Shizuma on the cover, and the second volume came out on October 27, 2006, featuring Nagisa and Tamao on the cover. While the manga's story is unfinished, Strawberry Panic! has not made an appearance in Dengeki G's Magazine since the publication of the April 2007 issue on February 28, 2007. Major differences between the anime and manga center around the plot and character interaction. Characters have vastly different character designs, such as Shion Tōmori and Kaname Kenjō. The manga introduces the Etoile election early on while the anime waits until the latter part of the series for dramatic effect. The first volume was released in English on December 23, 2007, the second in March 2008, and the omnibus with two additional chapters in October 2010, published by Seven Seas Entertainment.

=== Light novels ===
The announcement that a Strawberry Panic! light novel series was to be written based on the original short stories appeared in the April 2005 issue of Dengeki G's Magazine. Work on writing and illustrating the novels began in May 2005, by the same two people who worked on the manga. The announcement that the writing was finished appeared in the September 2005 issue of the same magazine, although the first novel was published by MediaWorks on their Dengeki Bunko publishing label, on March 10, 2006. The first volume had Shizuma and Nagisa on the cover and the second volume, released on August 9, 2006, had Amane and Hikari on the cover. The third and last volume, released on December 10, 2006, had Chikaru and Kizuna on the cover.

Seven Seas Entertainment announced on September 13, 2006, that they had licensed the right to release the English translations of the Strawberry Panic! light novels and the manga series. After several delays, the English version of the first light novel was released in March 2008, and the second volume light novel was released on July 8, 2008. An omnibus volume containing the three light novels was released in June 2011.

=== Anime ===
The anime series, entitled Strawberry Panic (without the exclamation mark), was produced by the Japanese animation studio Madhouse and directed by Masayuki Sakoi. The series was composed by Tatsuhiko Urahata, and featured two other screenwriters Hideo Takayashiki and Kazuyuki Fudeyasu. The character design was done by Kyūta Sakai, working from the original designs by Chitose Maki and later Namuchi Takumi. The twenty-six episode anime aired in Japan between April 3 and September 25, 2006, and has a central yuri theme.

The anime series is mainly based on the short stories and manga which preceded it. The anime focuses on Nagisa Aoi and, to a slightly lesser extent, Hikari Konohana, and the three girls that they each are or become close to at their respective schools; some admire them or wish to be their friend, and others are vying for their affections. Of particular focus are the romantic relationships between Nagisa and Shizuma Hanazono and between Hikari and Amane Ōtori. The series culminates in the election of the new Etoile pairing, although this aspect of the story is downplayed compared to the manga. Fan service, or giving appealing visuals of the girls nude or in provocative situations, is seen in the anime, but only briefly.

In Japan, eight DVD compilations, in regular and special editions, were released containing three episodes each, between June 23, 2006, and January 25, 2007. The regular and special editions are similar in content, but the special editions are packaged in jacket sleeve, and contain an original booklet which includes additional merchandise such as portable plates and straps. The special edition includes different versions of the opening and closing themes, and deleted scenes. Media Blasters released five English-subtitled DVDs of Strawberry Panic between March 4, 2007, and November 11, 2008. The English-subtitled DVDs contain five episodes, except for its first release, which contains six. The series premiered on Toku in the United States in January 2016.

=== Audio CDs ===
The original soundtrack for the anime adaptation was first released on September 6, 2006, by Lantis. On September 21, 2006, the soundtrack for the video game was released by the same company. The two opening themes for the anime, "Shōjo Meiro de Tsukamaete" and "Kuchibiru Daydream" were sung by Aki Misato. The "Shōjo Meiro de Tsukamaete" single was released on April 26, 2006, and reached an Oricon chart position of thirty-eight; "Kuchibiru Daydream" was released on August 9, 2006, and achieved forty-seven in the charts. The two main closing themes for the anime, "Himitsu Dolls" (released on May 24, 2006) and "Ichigo Tsumi Monogatari" (released on August 23, 2006), were sung by Mai Nakahara and Ai Shimizu as a duet. The final closing theme in the last episode was a slower remix version of "Shōjo Meiro de Tsukamaete", sung by Aki Misato.

There have been three drama CDs released based on the anime adaptation. The first, entitled Strawberry Panic Lyric 1 "Miator volume" was released in Japan on July 26, 2006. It featured the same voice actresses from the anime, and featured thirteen characters. It came with a CD containing twelve tracks of small scenes involving the characters in various situations. The second drama CD, Strawberry Panic Lyric 2 "Spica volume" was released on October 25, 2006, and a third was released on December 6, 2006, titled Strawberry Panic Lyric 3 "Lulim volume".

=== Visual novel ===
A visual novel named Strawberry Panic! Girls' School in Fullbloom was released on the PlayStation 2 on August 24, 2006, in Japan by MediaWorks. Two versions of the game were released, a regular edition and a limited edition which included a drama CD; there is a different cover for each of the versions. The drama CD contained three tracks, one for students of each school.

There are three playable characters, one from each of the schools: Nagisa, Hikari, and Kizuna. They have no family names in the game, as when the series of short stories were first published. While Ai Shimizu maintained her role for Kizuna in the game, Miyuki Sawashiro performed the voice for Tamao Suzumi. To alleviate male players' hesitation about playing as a female character and female players' rejection of any male characters among the otherwise all-female cast, the game features both a "boy mode" and a "girl mode". Choosing the male version means that the story is told via emails from the player's younger sister; choosing the female version means that the story is told in the player's own diary. The player is given the chance to pair their chosen character with one of the other nine available girls, not including the other possible playable characters. There are twenty-seven different combinations depending on which girl the player chooses at the start of the game.

The game is played over the course of a school semester. In "boy mode", each day concludes with a super deformed image of the heroine the player chose at the onset of the game slumped over her computer in her room; an email message from a girl that she interacted with during the day in on the monitor. As the heroine sleeps, the object of her affection appears in a thought bubble above her head. In "girl mode", she is seen writing in her diary instead. The game uses an angel and devil system where miniature angel and devil versions of each girl float beside her when critical decisions have to be made; this is not restricted to the three playable characters. It also features a "Strawberry chance" system, where the outcome of some scenes changes if the player presses one of the analog sticks fast enough after the message "Chance!" (チャンス!, Chansu!) is displayed in the upper right screen corner.

The game makes several departures from the light novels or anime adaptation including the lack of Etoiles and St. Miator/St. Spica student councillors. Also unique is the introduction of an athletic festival in May and a Princess seminar set in June.

=== Mobile apps ===
Several Strawberry Panic! apps were available on i-mode/EZweb published by Dwango in June 2006. They included:

Strawberry Panic! Mobile Puzzle
A conventional sliding puzzle. Finished puzzles may be used as wallpapers.
Stopani Spot the Difference
PS2 game trial
Stopani Adventure
A 3-part adventure game with a story based on the animated adaptation.
Stopani Quiz
A quiz on the animated adaptation of Strawberry Panic!
Calendar/Clock/Moe Calculator
Utility apps. Art from the animated adaptation of Strawberry Panic.

== Reception ==
During the reader participation game running in Dengeki G's Magazine, voting polls were first posted in the January 2004 issue of Dengeki G's Magazine, which were to determine who would be the subjects in the couplings between the characters of each respective school. The results were printed in the March 2004 issue, after about 1,979 votes had been cast. The three couples with the highest number of votes were Nagisa/Tamao at 481 votes, Hikari/Amane at 343 votes, and Kizuna/Chikaru at 260 votes. The results from the second round of voting were published in the May 2004 issue of the magazine which included the figures for the sixty-four different combinations between the twelve girls. The three couples with the highest number of votes this time were Nagisa/Tamao again at 150 votes, Nagisa/Amane at 114 votes, and Hikari/Amane for a second time at 102 votes. In the third round of voting in the July 2004 issue, the number of votes increased dramatically; the number one voted couple for the third time in a row was Nagisa/Tamao at 1,215 votes.

The Strawberry Panic! short stories were initially panned by Erica Friedman as being "distinctly derivative of Maria-sama ga Miteru". Friedman is the president of Yuricon, an anime convention geared towards fans of yuri anime and manga, and ALC Publishing, a publishing house dedicated to yuri. Friedman described the stories as, "candy apples without the apples - all sugary, and gooey and sweet, with not much of anything else to support it". After initially having this stance for the entire series, including an early opinion on the anime version, Friedman later changed her opinion slightly, writing that "[the anime] turned out pretty good". She went on to say, "There's no denying that Strawberry Panic! wasn't brilliant, but considering that it was meant to be trashy, it pulled out a few moments of dignity and elegance out of the trash heap." Jason Thompson regarded the Strawberry Panic! manga as "a nearly plotless cascade [where] everything seems rushed, and it is difficult to keep track of the characters and plot."

The five subtitled DVDs released by Media Blasters were reviewed by Anime News Network (ANN). The first DVD was declared rental-worthy by ANN, citing the characters as being "a lot of fun" and the series as being a "very laid-back show" that would work well as a relaxing watch over a weekend. The content, however, was described as getting the series off to a "slow start", with limitations of the first six episodes being the lack in fan service, humor, and that it "struggles to find any other reason to be compelling". The second DVD, containing episodes seven through eleven, was reviewed as failing to "materialize much real plot" and content of the episodes was described as existing "only to appeal to otaku who can get excited about moe content". The third DVD, compiling episodes twelve through sixteen, shows "signs of an actual plot" and contains a "sudden explosion of fan service", which are noted as "noteworthy developments" in the review. In the fourth DVD, containing episodes seventeen through twenty-one, "the series' romantic side does finally pay off with a romantic arc that actually engages". In the fifth and final DVD containing the last five episodes, the Hikari and Amane relationship is described as lacking chemistry, although the Nagisa and Shizuma pairing is regarded as satisfying.

Strawberry Panic! was one of the premier titles in the Light Novel and Strawberry (for yuri manga) production lines when it was licensed for English language distribution by Seven Seas Entertainment. In an interview with Seven Seas Entertainment founder Jason DeAngelis, he was posed the question, "How do you attract a fan base for a novel before its release in English?" His response was, "We try to choose titles that are already well-known, like Pita-Ten, Shinigami no Ballad or Strawberry Panic!....In terms of attracting a fan base, though, in the end it's all about word-of-mouth. If the material is great, it will stand out on its own and find its audience. The small format that we're publishing these books in is frankly stunning, and it will definitely attract fans who may not have heard of the property otherwise."

Strawberry Panic! Girls' School in Fullbloom received a total review score of 26/40 (out of the four individual review scores of 6, 7, 7, and 6) from the Japanese gaming magazine Famitsu. The game is listed by MediaWorks as one of their most-popular game titles.
