= Aki Misato =

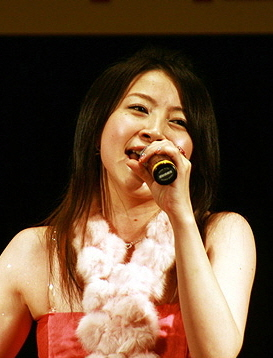
- Aki Misato on February 7, 2009

Background information
- Born: 美郷 あき (Misato Aki); September 2, 1981 (age 45)
- Origin: Saitama, Japan
- Genres: J-pop; Anime Soundtracks; Video Game Soundtracks
- Occupation: Singer
- Years active: 2004–present
- Labels: SOLID VOX; Lantis
- Website: http://misatoaki.jp/

Aki Misato (美郷 あき, Misato Aki; born September 2, 1981) is a female Japanese J-pop singer from Saitama, Japan. Most of her songs are theme songs for anime and video games. She made her debut in 2004 with her first single Kimi ga Sora Datta (君が空だった), which was featured as the ending theme of the anime Mai-HiME. To date she has released sixteen singles, and in addition has been featured in several compilation albums.

She's currently under both SOLID VOX and Lantis recording labels.

== Discography ==
=== Singles ===
1. Kimi ga Sora Datta (君が空だった), released November 26, 2004
2. Silent wing, released July 6, 2005
3. UNLIMITED FIRE, released August 24, 2005
4. Futari ga Wasurenai (ふたりが忘れない), released November 23, 2005
5. Ashita o Tomenaide (明日をとめないで), released February 6, 2006
6. Shōjo Meiro de Tsukamaete (少女迷路でつかまえて), released April 26, 2006
7. Kuchibiru Daydream (くちびる白昼夢), released August 9, 2006
8. Mou Ai shika Iranai (もう愛しかいらない), released January 24, 2007
9. BLOOD QUEEN, released May 9, 2007
10. disarm dreamer, released October 24, 2007
11. 'sad rain', released May 14, 2008
12. Life and Proud, released February 4, 2009
13. Made in WONDER, released August 5, 2009
14. Scarlet Bomb!, released October 21, 2009
15. Wild Succession, released November 25, 2009
16. What a beautiful world, released April 21, 2010
17. Shiawase wa Tsuki yori Takaku (シアワセは月より高く), released July 21, 2010

=== Albums ===
Sincerely, released November 22, 2006.

1. Ashita wo Tomenaide (明日をとめないで)
2. Yume ni Mita Rakuen (夢にみた楽園)
3. Silent wing
4. Shōjo Meiro de Tsukamete (berry's maturing version) (少女迷路でつかまえて [berry's maturing version])
5. Montage (モンタージュ)
6. Kimi ga Sora Datta (君が空だった)
7. UNLIMITED FIRE
8. Goal to NEW WORLD
9. before
10. true love?
11. Futari ga Wasurenai (ふたりが忘れない)
12. Kimi ga Sora Datta (acoustic version) (君が空だった [acoustic version])

feel it, released August 8, 2007.

1. Mou Ai Shika Iranai (もう愛しかいらない)
2. Kuchibiru Daydream (くちびる白昼夢)
3. HAPPY CHERRY FESTA!
4. TOMORROW'S TRUE
5. If...~I wish~ (feel it mix)
6. calling
7. Kizu wa Kaseki ni Narenai Keredo (傷は化石にならないけれど)
8. Confusion Lovers
9. Happiness (ハピネス)
10. Fujiyuu na Emotion (不自由なEmotion)
11. beautiful flower (feel this ver.)
12. feel it

here I am, released September 10, 2008.

1. Shōjo Meiro de Tsukamete (少女迷路でつかまえて)
2. disarm dreamer
3. Boukyaku Butterfly (忘却バタフライ)
4. sad rain (album ver.)
5. Ima no Kimi ga Tookute mo (いまの君が遠くても)
6. Ano Hana no Saku Koro ni (あの花の咲く頃に)
7. BLOOD QUEEN
8. Kokoro ni Saku Hana (心に咲く花)
9. I lost the place
10. Sayonara no Mukou Gawa de (さよならの向こう側で)
11. another life
12. here I am

from now on, released January 27, 2010.

1. Life and proud
2. Jewelry tears
3. Little wing
4. Nami no Kaidan (波の階段)
5. Scarlet Bomb!
6. Hide and seek
7. Unusual Days
8. all allow
9. Taiyou no Kizashi (兆しの太陽)
10. Made in WONDER
11. Love Wind
12. from now on

My Honesty, released April 20, 2011.

1. honest word, honest world
2. Cross Illusion
3. 最後のエデン
4. Separating moment
5. さよなら君の声
6. 奇跡
7. once more again
8. 陽だまりの中へ
9. シアワセは月より高く
10. あかるい恋のうた
11. Wild succession
12. 僕らの自由
13. What a beautiful world

Good Lovin' , released July 10, 2013.

1. Overture
2. brilliant voice
3. 愛のせいで眠れない
4. 君を感じる世界
5. Innocent heart?しあわせのすぐそばに?
6. DESIRE
7. unreal love!
8. 週末COUNT DOWN
9. Spread Wings.
10. 守護心PARADOX
11. 美しい地球を知る者よ
12. Dear my tears

=== Miscellaneous ===
1. Anime version of the Visual Novel: Maji De Watashi Ni Koi Shinasai!
  - Opening: "U-n-d-e-r—standing!" together with Masaaki Endoh and Hiroshi Kitadani
