= 5th Seiyu Awards =

2011 voice acting award in Tokyo

- Awarded for: Voice acting in Japan
- Date: March 5, 2011
- Location: JOQR Media Plus Hall; Minato, Tokyo
- Country: Japan

Highlights
- Best Lead Actor: No award given
- Best Lead Actress: Aki Toyosaki
- Website: www.seiyuawards.jp

The 5th Seiyu Awards ceremony was held on March 5, 2011, in Tokyo. The period of general voting lasted from Oct 22, 2010 to Jan 1, 2011. Some awards were given in February, ahead of the ceremony.

Winners are listed below.

Winners	Agency	Characters	Anime
Best Actor in leading role
No award given	N/A	N/A	N/A
Best Actress in leading role
Aki Toyosaki	Music Ray'n	Yui Hirasawa	K-On!!
Best Actors in supporting roles
Nobuhiko Okamoto	Pro-Fit	Takumi Usui; Eiji Niizuma; Accelerator	Kaichō wa Maid-sama! Bakuman; Toaru Majutsu no Index II
Kazuya Nakai	Aoni Production	Roronoa Zoro; Hijikata Toshirō	One Piece; Gintama
Best Actresses in supporting roles
Satomi Arai	Yu-rin Pro	Kuroko Shirai; Narrator	Toaru Kagaku no Railgun; Ōkami-san to Shichinin no Nakama-tachi
Kanae Itō	Aoni Production	Elucia de Lute Ima; Sanae Nagatsuki	The World God Only Knows; Shinryaku! Ika Musume
Best Rookie actors
Kōki Uchiyama	Himawari Theatre Group	Banagher Links; Natsuno Yūki	Mobile Suit Gundam UC; Shiki
Best Rookie actresses
Hisako Kanemoto	Production Baobab	Ika Musume; Kanata Sorami	Shinryaku! Ika Musume; So Ra No Wo To
Satomi Satō	Aoni Production	Wendy Marvell; Manami Tamura; Ritsu Tainaka	Fairy Tail; Ore no Imōto ga Konna ni Kawaii Wake ga Nai; K-On!!
Best Personality
Winner	Agency	Radio Programs	Broadcasting Station
Aki Toyosaki	Music Ray'n	Radion!! Pl@net Sphere; Toyosaki Aki no Okaeri Radio	
Best Musical Performance
Winners	Record Label	Album	Anime
Minori Chihara	Lantis	Sing All Love; Yasashii Bōkyaku	The Disappearance of Haruhi Suzumiya
Winners	Agency		
Special Achievement Award
Nachi Nozawa	Office PAC (final career)		
Achievement Award
Isao Sasaki	One Pair		
Hiroko Suzuki	Ken Production		
Masa'aki Yajima	Freelance		
Synergy Award
Detective Conan (Minami Takayama)
Kei Tomiyama Memorial Award (Topical Award)
Rikiya Koyama	Gekidan Haiyūza		
Overseas Fan's Award
Miyuki Sawashiro	Mausu Promotion		
Kids Family Award
Junko Takeuchi	Ogi Pro The Next		
Kazue Takahashi Memorial Award
Mayumi Tanaka	Aoni Production		
