= Parade (Minori Chihara album) =

Studio album by Minori Chihara
- Released: November 26, 2008 (Japan)
- Genre: Symphonic pop, Anisong
- Length: 69:17
- Label: Lantis

Minori Chihara chronology
Message 01 (2007)	Parade (2008)	Sing All Love (2010)

Singles from Parade
- 1. "Melty tale storage" 2. "Ameagari no Hana yo Sake"; 3. "Paradise Lost"

Parade is Minori Chihara's third solo album. The album contains all three CD singles released in the same year: Melty tale storage, Ameagari no Hana yo Sake, and a modified version of Paradise Lost. Its release promotion featured a "Dream Limited Edition" including an alternate album cover and a photo picturebook. Bonus items such as B2 posters and polaroid prints were also included upon purchase of the album at specific chain stores included in the promotion. Parade placed 16th on the Oricon charts after its debut.

== Track listing ==
1. "Toumei Park Nite" (透明パークにて, lit. "At the Translucent Park")
2. "Voyager train"
3. "Prism in the name of hope"
4. "Fairy Tune"
5. "Lush march!!"
6. "Sono Toki Boku wa Kamikazari wo Kau" (その時僕は髪飾りを買う, lit. "At That Time, I'll Buy Hair Ornaments")
7. "Melty tale storage"
8. "Aoi Kotou" (蒼い孤島, lit. "Solitary Blue Island")
9. "Hikari" (光, lit. "Light")
10. "Paradise Lost -at next nest-"
11. "FUTURE STAR"
12. "Ameagari no Hana yo Sake" (雨上がりの花よ咲け, lit. "Let the Flower Bloom After the Rain")
13. "Hanataba" (花束, lit. "Bouquet")
14. "everlasting..."
