= Sing for You =

Sing for You may refer to:

== Albums ==
- Sing for You (EP) or the title song (see below), by Exo, 2015
- Chad & Jeremy Sing for You, 1965
- Sing for You, by the Kids from "Fame", 1983
- Sing for You, by Webb Pierce, 1958

== Songs ==
- "Sing for You" (song), by Exo, 2015
- "Sing for You", by Kis-My-Ft2 from Kis-My-1st, 2012
- "Sing for you", by Minori Chihara from Sing All Love, 2010
- "Sing for You", by Steven Curtis Chapman from Worship and Believe, 2016
- "Sing for You", by Tracy Chapman from Our Bright Future, 2008
