= Message 01 =

Studio album by Minori Chihara
- Released: December 26, 2007 (Japan)
- Genre: J-pop
- Length: 4:36
- Label: Lantis

Minori Chihara chronology
Contact (2007)	Message 01 (2007)	Parade (2008)

Message 01 is Minori Chihara's PV (promotion video, better known as music videos) DVD. It also includes a bonus follow-up track to the album Contact on a separate CD as well as material related to the promotion of her career in the DVD.

== Contents ==
- PV
  - "Kimi ga Kureta Anohi" (君がくれたあの日, lit. "That Day You Gave")
  - "Shijin no Tabi" (詩人の旅, lit. "Travels of the Poet")
  - "Junpaku Sankuchuarii" (純白サンクチュアリィ, lit. "Pure White Sanctuary")
- History Documentary
  - Events prior to the release of Contact: "Grateful Days"
- Commercials
  - One version for Kimi ga Kureta Anohi.
  - Three versions for Contact.
  - Two versions for Message 01.
  - Promotional commercial: "Tokuhou"
- Bonus (CD)
  - Follow-up thirteenth track to Contact: "Contact 13th"
