= MVM Entertainment =

British entertainment company

- Type: Private limited company
- Industry: Entertainment
- Headquarters: Chepstow, Monmouthshire, Wales, United Kingdom
- Area served: United Kingdom and Ireland
- Products: Anime
- Website: MVM Films

MVM Entertainment, also known as MVM and MVM Films, is a British licensor and distributor of Japanese animation. The company also sub-licenses anime titles from US anime companies such as Media Blasters, Geneon, Nozomi Entertainment, Urban Vision, AnimEigo, US Manga Corps, Aniplex of America and Sentai Filmworks, which do not have a UK presence, and releases them on Region 2 DVD and Region B Blu ray. It is part of the MVM Group, which also has wholesale and retail arms, and specialises in anime, manga and related merchandise. It is headquartered in Chepstow, Monmouthshire, Wales.

== History ==
The company's old logo when it went under the name "MVM Films".

MVM Entertainment came into existence in 1990 as a mail order and retail shop that specialised in niche market items. It grew as did the demand for anime and manga products into the nineties, allowing the company to start licensing anime series for the United Kingdom market in 1998.

MVM currently have over 250 titles listed on their official website. The company continues to license TV series and films from major Japanese productions such as the Monogatari series, the Fate franchise, Girls und Panzer, as well as popular titles that include Berserk, Samurai Champloo, Tenchi Muyo!, No Game No Life, Land of the Lustrous, Flip Flappers, Toradora!, The Garden of Sinners and Rascal Does Not Dream of Bunny Girl Senpai.

Many of their releases have been jointly mastered with Australian distributors, including Madman Entertainment and Hanabee to save costs, and are therefore dual-region (Region 2 and Region 4). The company also won the Best Anime distributor award in the 2006 Neo Magazine Awards. MVM Entertainment had also managed to win the 2009 Best Anime Distributor award in Neo magazine amid stiff opposition from the likes of Beez and Manga Entertainment UK.

On 5 July 2018, owner Tony Allen gave an interview to The Anime Independent where he announced that MVM would begin to remove DVD from their new acquisitions in line with their partners at Sentai Filmworks and Madman Entertainment. He states:

We all suffer the same problem of minimum print runs on two formats where sales are then split across those formats and often leaving us large quantities of stock. Recent increases in costs of warehousing unsold and slow moving stock has made it all the more important to consider the hard economics of servicing two formats. It's just a repeat of the old VHS / DVD position.

The official dropping of DVD began in Q4 2018.

== Funimation ==
Up until November 2006, Funimation distributed their titles in the United Kingdom through MVM. However, in a surprise announcement, Funimation switched their British distributor to Revelation Films, starting in early 2007. This move has been credited to Funimation's takeover by the Navarre Corporation, which already distributed titles via Revelation in the UK. MVM retained their licences for some series animated by studio GONZO and licensed by Funimation in North America, such as Samurai 7 and Burst Angel, since they were licensed directly from GONZO. Nevertheless, MVM's market share was damaged, and the publisher lost some of their most popular titles, including Fruits Basket (although re-licensed by MVM in late 2011) and Fullmetal Alchemist. They later lost access to Chobits when the US rights passed from Geneon USA to Funimation; however, they succeeded in re-licensing it in late 2010, followed by Fruits Basket and Kiddy Grade in late 2011. MVM's most recent releases of Funimation-licensed titles (who have had an exclusive distribution agreement with Manga Entertainment since October 2008) are Aquarion, .hack//Quantum, Shakugan no Shana, Ga-Rei: Zero, Sankarea, Is This a Zombie? and [C] – Control. On 2 January 2014, MVM had acquired Accel World, We Without Wings, and Chrome Shelled Regios anime with Accel World being released in June 2014.
