= Contact (Minori Chihara album) =

Studio album by Minori Chihara
- Released: October 24, 2007 (Japan)
- Genres: Trance, anisong, symphonic pop
- Length: 59:34
- Label: Lantis

Minori Chihara chronology
Heroine (2004)	Contact (2007)	Message 01 (2007)

Contact is Minori Chihara's second solo album. It was first announced to be released at a press conference held during August 16, 2007 as part of her singing career revival and contains the title tracks from her two CD singles: Junpaku Sanctuary and Kimi ga Kureta Anohi. Its first pressing is a "Silver Limited Edition" including a foil slipcase and quad-fold digipak. A follow-up thirteenth track "Contact 13th" was released with the PV DVD Message 01 on December 26, 2007 on an extra CD included in the package. It is unknown if this track will be included in subsequent printings of the Contact album in the future.

== Track listing ==
1. "Contact"
2. "Shijin no Tabi" (詩人の旅; lit. "Travels of the Poet")
3. "Futari no Rifurekushon" (ふたりのリフレクション; lit. "Two Reflections")
4. "Junpaku Sankuchuarii" (純白サンクチュアリィ; lit. "Pure White Sanctuary")
5. "Dears ～Yuruyakana Kiseki～" (Dears ～ゆるやかな奇跡～; lit. "Dears ～Merciful Miracle～")
6. "Cynthia"
7. "sleeping terror"
8. "too late? not late..."
9. "Natsu wo Wasuretara" (夏を忘れたら; lit. "When You Forget the Summer")
10. "mezzo forte"
11. "Kimi ga Kureta Ano hi" (君がくれたあの日; lit. "That Day You Gave")
12. "truth gift"
13. "Contact 13th" (follow-up track released on Message 01)
