= List of Dragonaut: The Resonance characters =

The fictional characters from the anime and manga series Dragonaut -The Resonance- are designed by Makoto Uno and the dragon and mechanical designs done by Junya Ishigaki. Nihon Ad Systems (NAS) developed the anime series with Gonzo studio as its co-producer.

== Main ==
From left to right: Machina, Gio, Jin, and Toa.

Jin Kamishina (カミシナ・ジン, Kamishina Jin)
Voiced by: Daisuke Ono (Japanese); Justin Pate (English)

Jin Kamishina is an 18-year-old boy who, two years prior, lost his family (his parents and younger sister) in a space shuttle accident. He was the only known survivor, who mysteriously had no major injuries, despite falling from a high altitude. To make matters worse, the ISDA had also reported that the shuttle incident was due to pilot error (Jin's father, the pilot, being blamed). Since then, he has lived a solitary existence, being shunned by people, and feeling as though he was all alone in the world. However, this all changed after he meets Toa, who becomes the first person in two years that he connects with. It is also later revealed that Toa was the one who saved Jin from falling to his death during the shuttle incident, and that, at that time, he also underwent a successful Resonance with her. However, Toa also reveals that she too was the one responsible for the space shuttle accident, which killed Jin's family and the others. Despite this, Jin still continues to protect her.
In the manga, Jin's character is drastically different compared to his anime counterpart. When dragons invaded Earth, his family was killed in the destruction of Tokyo two years prior to the story's beginning. Due to this, he seemingly becomes cold-hearted and vengeful, showing no mercy when destroying invading dragons. He is considered to be one of the most dangerous of the Dragonauts when he actualizes with his partner Toa, whom he often insults (albeit, in a seemingly comedic nature). He is also shown to have some athletic abilities of his own. Despite his stoic attitude, he strives to protect mankind with the power [Toa] he has gained.

Toa (トア)
Voiced by: Minori Chihara (Japanese); Colleen Clinkenbeard (English)

Toa is a mysterious girl who, two years after the space shuttle accident, saves Jin from a dragon who was feeding on a woman in its semi-transformed state (half humanoid, half dragon). Toa is shown to have remarkable athletic abilities, extraordinary strength, and accelerated healing capabilities, even showing to be able to heal others as well; all of which are attributed to the fact that she is a dragon from Thanatos. In her Dragon Form, she is immensely powerful; she is able to take on more than two other dragons at a time. She is referred to as the "Album" by the ISDA, who wishes to capture her in order to retrieve information on the original dragons from Thanatos.
She calls Thanatos 'mother', and her mission on Earth is revealed to be the retrieval of the Earth-made dragons possessed by the ISDA.
She later admits to being one of the three dragons that collided with the space shuttle that day, which killed Jin's family (plus everyone else on it). She got the name "Toa" after retrieving half of a bracelet that belonged to Jin's sister, Ai. Before the accident, the bracelet had "To Ai" engraved on it, but now it only reads "To A", which is where she got her name from.
She also bears a relatively bright "stigmata", which signifies her impending death; the brighter it glows, the closer she is to death. However, her stigmata disappears in the final episode.
Toa is a Barrier-Type dragon. In her Communicator (human) Form, she can create a shield strong enough to repel a fully actualized dragon. In her Dragon Form, she mainly disables her opponents by locking them in barrier spheres.
In the manga, she is part of the Dragonauts and is partnered with Jin, with whom she had Resonated with two years ago right after hatching from her egg. Though she possesses all the abilities as her anime counterpart, she is shown to be very klutzy, which often infuriates Jin. Despite Jin's seemingly cold attitude towards her, she remains very loyal to him.

Gio (ギオ)
Voiced by: Junichi Suwabe (Japanese); Christopher Sabat (English)

Gio is a dragon from the ISDA who is assigned to be Kazuki Tachibana's "partner" after Kazuki successfully resonated with Gio's dragon egg form. However, despite being Kazuki's partner, Gio does not take orders from him, showing more concern for Toa, whom he states he was born to protect. Due to this, he is considered to be a failed experiment. His attachment to Toa seems to stem from the fact that he awakened early to Toa's cry when she first actualized in the series. After Toa runs away he assists Jin in finding her eventually ending up on Mars.
During a battle on Mars after seeing Akira killed and Machina falling to her death, his energy drastically increased while in his dragon form, and he created an explosion that caused the planet to burn; a phenomenon that can still be seen from Earth even a year later. During the time skip he lived with Toa and Jin and got a job. He seems to have developed an interest in cooking. Later, when he returns from his brief visit to Thanatos, his personality seems to have shifted, as he attacks his former comrades, and claims to be Thanatos's successor. However, he had only done this in order to ensure that Toa does not die. He would once again help his friends stop Thanatos, and in the end, he leaves Earth. Where he went to, is unknown.
Despite initially finding Jin to be a nuisance, he later forms a bond with him due to their shared feelings for Toa. After realizing how Jin and Toa feel for each other, he takes a supportive role, and tries to protect the two from danger. However, he still has lingering feelings for Toa, resulting in him feeling isolated from the two.
Gio is a sword type dragon. He is able to create a black sword while in his Communicator form. His finishing attack as a dragon is a passing slash with a sharp horn that he extends.
His name is derived from his code-number, "G10", which Kazuki misread as "Gio".
In the manga, he makes his first appearance as Kazuki's dragon partner.

== International Solarsystem Development Agency (ISDA) ==
Kiril Zhazhiev (キリル・ジャジエフ, Kiriru Jajiefu)
Voiced by: Yūichi Nagashima (Japanese); Jerry Russell (English)

Kiril is the leader of the D-Project, and is the man in charge of finding ways to destroy Thanatos.

Baisil Sakaki (ベイゼル・サカキ, Beizeru Sakaki)
Voiced by: George Nakata (Japanese); Robert McCollum (English)

Sakaki is a soldier working for the ISDA as the Dragonauts' military commander. He had been the one that suggested the use of dragons in destroying Thanatos, and believes that the D-Project should go public. He remains to work for the ISDA even after it falls under Gillard command, believing all dragons are a threat to Earth's safety. Despite this, he uses a dragon, who looks like his deceased daughter, to capture other dragons. Though he considers her to be a tool, he sometimes shows concern for her, even admitting his love for her when she chooses to stay by his side.
He witnessed the death of his wife (Martina) and daughter (Laura), who were on the same shuttle flight as Jin's family.

Laura
Voiced by: Miyuki Sawashiro (Japanese); Carrie Savage (English)

Laura is Sakaki's dragon counterpart, often calling him her father. She initially remains hidden in Sakaki's apartment, but works with him to capture other dragons a year later. Though he treats her like a tool, she remains completely loyal to him. She wears a mechanical suit for battle, and possesses the stigmata,
She is revealed to be "Raum", the final original dragon from Thanatos. She apparently lost connection with her original dragon form after completing a Resonance with Sakaki, which is why she only battles in a mechanical suit. Her original form was the dragon encased in the giant tube at the ISDA, but that is destroyed by Nozaki.

=== Lindworm Unit ===
Raina Cromwell (ライナ・クロムウェル, Raina Kuromuweru)
Voiced by: Takuma Takewaka (Japanese); J. Michael Tatum (English)

Raina is the leader of the Lindworm Unit, having joined them in order to test his potential, which was encouraged by Jin's father, who had recommended Raina for the D-Project. He is also a Dragonaut whose partner is Howlingstar. He and Howlingstar defects from the ISDA after it falls under Gillard command.
He is the ISDA's public representative, and is quite popular with girls, often receiving presents when he appears in public.

Howlingstar (ハウリングスター, Hauringusutā)
Voiced by: Tomokazu Sugita (Japanese); Brad Hawkins (English)

Howlingstar is Raina's dragon partner and the leader of the Communicators in the Lindworm Unit. He is the most energetic of his fellow Communicators and often likes to show off his skills.
He is a spear type dragon. He can create a massive spear as his weapon of choice. In his dragon form, he is red colored with his wings forming two half-cones, that he can combine to make his finishing move, a high speed charge that pierces through the enemy.

Akira Sōya (ソウヤ・アキラ, Sōya Akira)
Voiced by: Miyuki Sawashiro (Japanese); Brina Palencia (English)

Akira is a Dragonaut for the Lindworm Unit. She has a close relationship with her dragon partner, Machina, whom she believes to be the ideal woman that is the exact opposite of her, and who also acts more like an older sister towards Akira. However, she has always been hesitant to love Machina, as the latter is a dragon, but after meeting Jin, she realizes that the relationship between dragon and human can become much more. Due to this, she often helps Jin, even to the point of betraying the Lindworm Unit. However, she still considers its members to be her comrades, and does not let her betrayal get in the way of helping them when need be. She is killed by Garnet in episode 16.
When she dies in the anime at the hands of Garnet, Machina encases both herself and Akira in ice. Later, they both merge with Thanatos as part of its soul, though they both seem to lose their real identities. At the end of the series, Thanatos leaves Earth in peace and when the dragonauts are overjoyed that they saved the world, the spirits of Akira and Machina are seen as they smile at each other knowing that humans and dragon can coexist, and with that their spirits flew away.
In the manga, Akira is the newest member of the Dragonauts, being the latest to complete a Resonance. She also expresses a direct liking for Jin, clashing with both Toa and Sieglinde.

Machina (マキナ, Makina)
Voiced by: Yūko Gotō (Japanese); Caitlin Glass (English)

Machina is Akira's dragon partner, who acts like a big sister towards Akira, correcting her speech and keeping her in check. She states that she follows Akira because she wants to, not because Akira is her master. When Akira dies, Machina goes berserk in response, but later encases herself and Akira in ice, though merges with Thanatos as part of its soul a year later. When Thanatos leaves Earth to be in peace, Akira and Machina's spirits are seen as the two of them smile at each other as they knew that humans and dragons can live in peace, and with that their spirits flew away.
Machina is a water type dragon. She has the ability to manipulate water when in her Communicator form. In her dragon form, she can attack with liquid whips and also with concentrated balls of water, along with unleashing countless ice crystals from her wings. These attacks seem particularly effective against fire-type elements.

Sieglinde Baumgard (ジークリンデ・バウムガルド, Jīkurinde Baumugarudo)
Voiced by: Nana Mizuki (Japanese); Cherami Leigh (English)

Sieglinde is the heir to the Baumgard family fortune, and is a child prodigy, having entered college at the age of nine. She is chosen to become a Dragonaut for the Lindworm Unit, and her dragon partner is Amadeus, who is named after her now-deceased dog. Due to her studies, she has been lonely since her youth, and she considered her dog to be her only friend before it died. She and Amadeus defects from the ISDA after it falls under Gillard command.
Despite her seemingly cold attitude, she considers some members of the unit to be her family, and lives in the ISDA facilities. She seems to have feelings for Jin.
In the manga, Sieglinde is transferred from America to the Dragonauts team in Japan.

Amadeus (アマデウス, Amadeusu)
Voiced by: Eiji Maruyama (Japanese); Mark Stoddard (English)

Amadeus is Sieglinde's dragon partner, who seems to act more like her butler. Despite his elderly looks, he is a competent fighter and cares deeply for Sieglinde, constantly worrying for her safety.
His name is based on the name of Sieglinde's now-deceased dog, and his appearance is similar to Sieglinde's grandfather. His name and appearance might also be a reference to legendary Austrian composer Wolfgang Amadeus Mozart.
He is a gravity type dragon. He is able to unleash large bursts of gravity in his Communicator form. He has a bulky form as a dragon resembling a bomber, which does not hinder his ability to fly, and he attacks with bursts of gravity waves.

Kazuki Tachibana (タチバナ・カズキ, Tachibana Kazuki)
Voiced by: Tetsuya Kakihara (Japanese); Todd Haberkorn (English)

Kazuki was Jin's best friend from before the accident. The two had promised to go into space together, resulting in their admission into the astronaut training program, but the shuttle accident caused Jin to leave the program.
Kazuki now works for the ISDA as part of the Dragonauts after his successful Resonance with Gio. In order to fulfill their promise, he tries to get Jin to join, ignorant of Jin's trauma of the shuttle accident.
However, after seeing Jin fly off with Gio, he felt betrayed and starts to feel some anger and resentment towards Jin. He partners up with another Communicator named Widow, who lost her original partner, in order to retrieve Gio himself. He eventually cuts his hair to a more wild and crazed look to reflect his rage. He constantly acts rashly and violently in his attempts to retrieve Gio, whom he considers to be an object that belongs to him. Later, during a battle with Jin and Gio, he receives a scar between his eyes.
After the ISDA falls under Gillard command, he remains with them, and works with Widow in order to capture other dragons. However, after Widow's death, he comes to realize his true feelings, and reconciles with Jin after a brief altercation.
In the manga, he is introduced as a Dragonaut, whose dragon partner is Gio.

Keiichi Amagi (アマギ・ケイイチ, Amagi Keiichi)
Voiced by: Eiji Miyashita (Japanese); Joel McDonald (English)

Amagi is a member of the Lindworm Unit and is partnered with Spirytus. He becomes unstable in the second episode, causing Spirytus to go mad, which in turn causes Spirytus to eat Amagi.

Spirytus (スピリタス, Supiritasu)

Spirytus is Amagi's dragon partner. When Amagi becomes unstable, he goes mad, causing him to eat Amagi while in his dragon form, and is thus reluctantly killed by Howlingstar. Before losing complete control, Spirytus had begun to feed on humans in his semi-transformed state and was revealed to be the so-called serial killer plaguing the city.

=== Vritra Unit ===
Itsuki Habaragi (ハバラギ・イツキ, Habaragi Itsuki)
Voiced by: Ryōko Ono (Japanese); Luci Christian (English)

Itsuki is the leader of the Vritra Unit. Her dragon partner is Otohime and she is also apparently acquainted with Raina. She has a younger brother in the same unit named Yuuya.

Otohime (オトヒメ)
Voiced by: Ryōko Ono (Japanese); Luci Christian (English)

Otohime is Itsuki's dragon partner. She bears a striking resemblance to Itsuki, with the only differences being the color of their hair, their clothing, and that Itsuki has markings under her eyes. Yuuya addresses both of them as "nee-san" which is Japanese for 'older sister'.

Yūya Habaragi (ハバラギ・ユウヤ, Habaragi Yūya)
Voiced by: Takehiro Satō (Japanese); Chris Burnett (English)

Yūya is a member of the Vritra Unit and also Itsuki's younger brother. Though he looks forward to fighting beside his sister, he has yet to complete a Resonance or find a dragon partner.
When the fourth original dragon from Thanatos appears and destroys the Vritra Unit's space station, he is the first to come in contact with it, but his survival is uncertain as he seemingly appears to have died in the destruction of the station.

=== Researchers ===
Kasuga Nozaki (ノザキ・カスガ, Nozaki Kasuga)
Voiced by: Hozumi Gōda (Japanese); Duncan Brannan (English)

Kasuga is the head of the D-Project's research group. He is credited to being the man responsible for the rapid advancement in dragon research for the past two years.
He is later revealed to be the third original dragon, but clashes with the fourth original dragon, after the latter realizes Kasuga has sided with humans. He had been sent to Earth to retrieve the Earth-born dragons, but suffered from guilt over the lives he had taken when he collided with the shuttle two years ago. Yuuri, who later recognizes his dragon form as the same one she saw two years ago, calls him "Atrum" (アトルム, Atorumu). Kasuga had apparently completed a Resonance with her at that time, and is very protective of her. He considers the Earth-made dragons his "children", and his top priority is to see the remaining eggs hatch safely. After the one-year time skip, he is revealed to possess the stigmata. In the end of the anime, he sacrifices himself, blowing up massive numbers of dragons due to the anti-Thanatos factor he absorbed earlier, and allowing Jin, Toa, and Gio to enter Thanatos.

Yūri Kitajima (キタジマ・ユウリ, Kitajima Yūri)
Voiced by: Mayumi Asano (Japanese); Stephanie Young (English)

Yūri is a scientist who studies dragons and was part of the original team that discovered the first dragon egg on the ocean floor. She is entirely devoted to researching more about the original dragons, and especially wants to examine Toa since she is an original dragon. After the one-year time skip, she travels with Kasuga in a submarine in order to evade the ISDA.

Nanami Hoshi (ホシ・ナナミ, Hoshi Nanami)
Voiced by: Eri Sendai (Japanese); Kate Oxley (English)

Nanami is Yuuri's research assistant. She is seemingly close to Yuuri, and has a very lively personality. She is later revealed to be a spy for the Gillard military, but she continues to worry over Yuuri.
In an attempt to save Earth, she later tries to free Toa, but fails and dies when she is shot in the back by Garnet.

=== Operators ===
These are the operators of the ISDA base: Ryōko Kakei (カケイ・リョウコ, Kakei Ryōko)
Voiced by: Yū Kobayashi (Japanese); Trina Nishimura (English)

Saki Kurata (クラタ・サキ, Kurata Saki)
Voiced by: Yukari Fukui (Japanese); Leah Clark (English)

Megumi Jingūji (ジングウジ・メグミ, Jingūji Megumi)
Voiced by: Chise Nakamura (Japanese); Jad Saxton (English)

Their voices are also used in next episode previews and in entertaining skits. Their voice actors have their own internet radio show called the Dragonaut Station ISDA Information Agency.

== Gillard New Emirates ==
Asim Jamar (アーシム・ジャマール, Āshimu Jamāru)
Voiced by: Mamoru Miyano (Japanese); Jerry Jewell (English)

Asim is the second Prince of Gillard, having received his title after the death of the previous prince, and the commander of the Gillard military. He acts on his own selfish desires, caring little for others. He is initially interested in Gio, but later takes more interest in Toa, finding her power and origins more exciting. He later dies with Garnet in a huge explosion created by Gio, however, the two reappear a year later as part of Thanatos' soul.
Fifteen years prior to the story's beginning, Asim had resonated with Garnet's dragon egg.

Garnet MacLaine (ガーネット・マクレーン, Gānetto Makurēn)
Voiced by: Aya Hirano (Japanese); Lydia Mackay (English)

Garnet is a major in the Gillard military, who is mainly after the secret behind the Resonance process. She does not let her feelings get in the way of her duties, and is revealed to be a dragon who had resonated with Asim fifteen years ago. She and Asim are later engulfed in an explosion created by Gio, and are presumed dead, though is shown to have merged with Thanatos a year later. It is suspected that Garnet was complicit in the death of Asim's Older Brother. Possibly on orders from the younger prince himself.
She is extremely skilled with a katana, which she always carries with her ever since she visited Japan.

== Others ==
Kō Yonamine (ヨナミネ・コウ, Yonamine Kō)
Voiced by: Taiten Kusunoki (Japanese); Eric Vale (English)

A reporter working with Yuuri Kitajima, often gathering information for her. He seems to have had a past relationship with Yuuri, who is often annoyed with his advances. Kō also appears to be gathering information for Raina. He later helps Jin, claiming that it is for the sake of someone very dear to him. It is later revealed that he is working for an unknown agency.
In the official Dragonaut site, a whole section is dedicated to his reports of each episode's story (which are written in his point of view; revealing some information not shown in the episodes).

Widow (ウィドー, Widō)
Voiced by: Saeko Chiba (Japanese); Jamie Marchi (English)

A woman who meets Kazuki after he gets beat up by a group of thugs. She is revealed to be a Communicator, and allows Kazuki to pilot her in order for him to retrieve Gio. She seems to have lost someone very dear to her, thus she partners with Kazuki because she feels that he has also lost someone who was very important to him. Though Kazuki treats her coldly, her only desire is to see to Kazuki's happiness. After the one-year time skip, she disappears once she reveals herself to be dying.
Like a spider, Widow can shoot fiber strands from her fingertips which can either ensnare targets or cut objects to pieces. She also has the ability to put someone to sleep with her nails.

Ostrum (オストルム, Osutorumu)
Voiced by: Masami Iwasaki (Japanese); Justin Cook (English)

The fourth original dragon sent to Earth from Thanatos. His introduction is a violent one, as he destroys the ISDA's L-3 space station in his first few moments in Earth's orbit. He has no mercy for humans, but his top priority seems to be the destruction of the Earth-made dragons. He is able to take Communicator form, but who exactly he resonated with is unknown. However, the only known direct human contact he had before taking his Communicator form was with Yuuya. Later, it appears that Ostrum dies in an explosion caused by the Type-X warhead. However, he is revealed to have lived in the final episode, but then dies after he is defeated by Gio.
Ostrum is a fire type dragon. He is able to create bursts of flames, and is also able to incapacitate his opponents with blinding lights. As an original dragon, he is an extremely formidable opponent, and is capable of overpowering the entire Lindworm Unit.
Thanatos is shown to be able to produce billions of dragons resembling Ostrum.

== Manga only characters ==
Belurum (ベルルム, Berurumu)

Belurum is a dragon that hatched at the same time as Toa, and calls her his sister. He is able to take Communicator form after completing a Resonance with Jin's sister Ai, whom he claims to have killed, directly after hatching. However, Ai had actually died because when she reacted fearfully of Belurum, she tried to reach for Jin, but instead was touched by a dragon egg's tentacle, dying as a result. Due to this, he came to think it was his fault, soon turning that guilt into a hatred for all humans, wanting their complete destruction, especially humans with Resonances; he believes that they will end up abandoning their dragon partners. He seems to have the ability to be able to disrupt the connection between an artificially made dragon and their partners, and to also make those dragons do his bidding.

== See also ==
- List of Dragonaut -The Resonance- episodes
