= List of Ga-Rei: Zero episodes =

Ga-Rei: Zero
- Cover of Ga-rei-Zero's Blu-ray/DVD box set by Funimation. From left: Yomi Isayama and Kagura Tsuchimiya.
- Native name
- Kanji: 喰霊-零-
- No. of episodes: 12

Release
- Original network: CTC, TV Saitama, tvk, KBS, Sun TV, TVQ, Tokyo MX, TV Aichi, TVh, AT-X
- Original release: October 5 – December 21, 2008

Ga-Rei: Zero (喰霊-零-; translation: "soul who eats -zero-") is an anime adaptation and prequel of Hajime Segawa's manga series Ga-Rei. It is directed by Ei Aoki and animated by AIC Spirits and Asread. The show had previously aired on AT-X, Chiba TV, KBS Kyoto, Sun TV, Tokyo MX TV, TV Aichi, TV Hokkaido, TV Kanagawa, TV Saitama and TVQ Kyushu Broadcasting Co., Ltd. The original airing consisted of a total of twelve episodes and were broadcast from October 5 to December 21, 2008. Funimation Entertainment has a home entertainment, digital, merchandise, and mobile rights license to show the series in North America with a complete DVD series out by 2011.

As a prequel story, Ga-Rei Zero is set before the events of the manga, following Kagura Tsuchimiya and Yomi Isayama—swordswomen and heiresses from a long line of Japanese exorcist families. Both girls suffered a personal tragedy in their lives, yet they develop a strong sister-like bond. As both of them grow up, they both must overcome their weaknesses, accepting being the daughters of exorcists and following their families tradition. Yet tragedy will befall both of them which will turn these two "sisters" into bitter enemies.

The adaptation was announced on the promotional sleeve wrapper of Ga-Rei's sixth volume regarding the green-lighting of the show. A Ga-Rei: Zero television ad was soon aired to promote the show's upcoming release, followed by 30 second commercials that were on the Ga-Rei: Zero websites.

The opening theme, "Paradise Lost", was performed by Minori Chihara while the ending theme, "Yume no Ashioto ga Kikoeru", is performed by Kaoru Mizuhara. "Paradise Lost" was performed twice as an ending theme, for both the third and final episode. A character image song album titled "Ga-Rei Sounyuuka & Image Song Shuu - Yuri-mu Croquette" was released on December 25, 2008. The Paradise Lost single was released on November 5, 2008 while Yume no Ashioto ga Kikoeru single was released on November 26, 2008.

Several character image CDs were also released. The first CD, with vocals by Minori Chihara and Kaoru Mizuhara, was released on February 4, 2009. The second CD, with vocals by Maki Tsuchiya and Mai Aizawa, was released on February 25, 2009. The third image CD, with vocals by Minoru Shirashi and Shinya Takahashi, was released on March 25, 2009. The fourth image CD, with vocals by Tetsu Inada and Norio Wakamoto was released on May 27, 2009.

DVDs of Ga-Rei: Zero, both regular and Director's cut DVD versions, have been released with five volumes starting with the release of Volume 1 on December 26, 2008. Volume 2 was released on January 30, 2009 with Volume 3 subsequently released on February 27, 2009. Volume 4 was released on March 27, 2009. Volume 5 was released on April 24, 2009. Volume 6 was the latest Ga-rei: Zero DVD released on May 29, 2009. Each volume of the DVDs include an OST containing tracks used during the show as well as Special Talk interviews with the cast. The Blu-ray box of Ga-Rei Zero was released on July 23, 2010, for 27,000 Yen The Ga-rei Zero Live DVD was released on the same day as the Blu-ray Box for 5,800 Yen.

== Episode list ==
No.	Title	Directed by	Written by	Original release date
1	"Above Aoi"; Transliteration: "Aoi no Ue" (Japanese: 葵上)	Ei Aoki	Katsuhiko Takayama	October 5, 2008
Members of the Japanese Ministry of Defense's Paranormal Disaster Countermeasure Headquarters (PDCH) are summoned to eliminate Kashas and Ghosts, paranormal Category B beast-like beings and Category C human-like beings that are only visible to few and are vulnerable to holy water, scriptures and blessed weapons. The initial efforts of the 1st Section seem successful until they are attacked and overwhelmed, at that point Toru and Natsuki of the 4th Division intervene to save the survivors. Despite being able to kill the Kashas by luring them into traps, the 4th Special Division operatives are massacred by a katana-wielding woman.
2	"Manifestation of Hatred"; Transliteration: "Nikushimi no Hatsuro" (Japanese: 憎発露)	Kenji Setō	Katsuhiko Takayama	October 12, 2008
The Ministry of Environment's Supernatural Disaster Countermeasures Division (SDCD), under the leadership of Ayame Jinguuji, intervene after numerous PDCH casualties are reported by the Ministry of Defense. Amongst the SDCD operators deployed for the mission is middle-school student and katana-wielder Kagura Tsuchimiya. Corpses of the 1st Special Division commandos come mysteriously back to life after being slaughtered due to the influence of Latchers, Category D spiritual beings, forcing SDCD operatives into action. The katana-wielding woman that caused this mayhem is revealed to be Yomi Isayama, an ex-SDCD operative who has somehow been corrupted and converted in Category A spirit user, the higher and most dangerous enemy SDCD face.
3	"The Times of the Chance Encounter"; Transliteration: "Kaikō no Migiri" (Japanese: 邂逅砌)	Makoto Bessho	Katsuhiko Takayama	October 19, 2008
This episode goes back to events that occur some 3 years before the first two episodes. Kagura was placed under the care of the Isayama family at a very young age, after her mother was killed in battle and her father inherited her Ga-rei Byakuei and the duties this entailed. The girls quickly bond, drawn to each other by Kagura's pain of losing her mother, the deep sense of duty towards her family, and Yomi's wish for a sister. Yomi introduces Kagura to the SDCD field team led by Kouji Iwahata, a veteran SDCD operator, and Kagura begins to understand what fighting against spirit beings really looks like.
4	"The Cause of the Duty"; Transliteration: "Tsutome no Taigi" (Japanese: 務大義)	Keiji Gotoh	Katsuhiko Takayama	October 26, 2008
The SDCD operatives are dispatched to eliminate a Tsuchigumo that appeared out of town. When Yomi kills the Category B spirit, Kagura saves a woman from being crushed by its body, a civilian who could not only see the spirit but who is also a witness of the team's entire operation. Yomi and Kagura are later called out to an old subway tunnel where they encounter the same woman, now a vengeful spirit after having killed herself, together with a group of spirits of other dead people. Kagura's father arrives to save them by using the Ga-rei spirit Byakuei upon Kagura's inability to purify the dead humans. When all is over he harshly reprimands her, by reminding Kagura about her great responsibility as a Vanquisher, and by firmly exhorting her to become stronger.
5	"Obstinate Feelings"; Transliteration: "Katakuna no Omoi" (Japanese: 頑想)	Naoto Hosoda	Katsuhiko Takayama	November 2, 2008
Yomi's and Nori's fathers have arranged their official engagement, despite the objections from her uncle since she was adopted into the Isayama family. His daughter Mei should, in his opinion, be the heir and carry Shishio, the Katana that hosts Ranguren that was entrusted to Yomi instead. Not only was she born in the family, but she is a talented Vanquisher, even stronger and surely more experienced than Yomi At the SDCD Headquarter, Yomi and Nori get into an argument over a trivial matter, which is something quite usual between the two. Having witnessed their latest fight and fearing their relationship could end, Kagura comes up with a plan to reunite them with the help from the entire SDCD division. But, although they constantly fight, Yomi and Nori's feelings for each other run deep.
6	"Beautiful Enemy"; Transliteration: "Utsukushi no Teki" (Japanese: 美敵)	Masaharu Tomoda	Katsuhiko Takayama	November 9, 2008
A host of Category D monsters appear more and more frequently and the SDCD team have their hands full with their purification, including Kagura who, for the first time, is in the field by herself. Mei senses a higher Category being which she seeks out, finding herself suddenly facing Kazuhiro Mitogawa, a white-haired boy accompanied by a swarm of blue butterflies. They start to fight but the difference in their power is so far apart, that with no effort whatsoever he pierces her with her own weapon. At the same time Kagura faces her friendly school nurse who is attacking her two girlfriends after having killed a man, while been controlled by a Latcher, a mind-controlling Category D. To protect her classmates, Kagura is forced to kill the woman that, only hours before, had cared for her, which causes great turmoils in her emotions.
7	"Chains of Blame"; Transliteration: "Kashaku no Rensa" (Japanese: 呵責連鎖)	Yorifusa Yamaguchi	Katsuhiko Takayama	November 16, 2008
Mei, pierced by her own spear, stands up after having been touched by a blue butterfly, her mortal wound vanished. Deeply conflicted after killing the school nurse when possessed by a Leacher, Kagura is given time off to heal together with Yomi, who should support her in this difficult moment. Kagura struggles between the need to rid the world of spirits and the need to kill to do so, even questioning her fate linked to her family name, trying to get clarity for her future by sharing her story with her two classmates, since they already know her secret. At the same time, Yomi's father summons his brother and Mei to inform them that he will soon pass his role as head of the Isayama family to Yomi. His brother reluctantly accepts his wish, although he speaks hard words to Yomi to make sure she is aware of the honour and responsibilities that come with being entrusted Shishio, but Mei goes back to the house when her uncle is by himself. After a sparring session in which Yomu realizes that Kagura is going to surpass her very soon, the two girls part ways, Kagura meeting her classmates and Yomi meeting with Nori. When Kagura arrives home, she finds Yumi's father in a pool of blood, and although all is done to save is life, Yomi arrives at the hospital to find him dead.
8	"Whereabouts of Revenge"; Transliteration: "Fukushū no Yukuhe" (Japanese: 復讐行方)	Hiroshi Tamada	Katsuhiko Takayama	November 23, 2008
At the wake for Yomi's father and before the whole clan, Yomi's uncle declares himself head of the family, and that Mei will carry on the role of the Vanquisher, against his late brother's wishes. Yomi is forced to hand over Shishiou to Mei, alongside her own place in the family, her room and even her proximity to Kagura who is asked to leave the family home, now property of Yomi's uncle. When Mei finally unsheathes Shishio, her life-long dream come true, she relives in horror the moments of her fight with Kazuhiro and remembers what she has done. Dismayed she runs out where, under the rain, she meets Kazuhiro again. She realizes that not only what has happened was her true wish, but also that she has no other choice but giving up her humanity since she has already sustained such severe injuries that her life would not be possible otherwise. At the same time, both a Category B and a powerful Category A appear, and the team is called into action, this is the first time the SDCD team is in contact with the PDCH. Yomi also leaves home taking Kagura's katana, driving to find and confront Mei, having realized that something is definitely wrong with her. During their fight Yomi realizes that Mei is no longer human and that she is protected by a Sesshōseki stone, that was given to her by Kazuhiro to restore her body. Unfortunately for Mei, the white-haired body is more interested in Yomi so Mei's wounds suddenly reappear and Yomi is able to reduce her after Mei confesses of having always resented Yomi and, because of that hatred, having killed her father. Enraged, Yomi kills Mei. At the end of the episode, Kazuhiro appears to Yomi just after she has killed Mei. He tells Yomi that he only gave Mei what she wanted, which is what he will do with her. And he unleashes a rain of spikes that pierce Yomi all over her body.
9	"Spiral of Sin"; Transliteration: "Tsumi no Rasen" (Japanese: 罪螺旋)	Jun Takahashi	Katsuhiko Takayama	November 30, 2008
After being forced out of the fight against the Category B by the PDCH, the SDCD team is sent where the Category A is supposed to be, to find instead Yomi gravely injured. Yomi is rushed to the hospital, where she remains in a coma for two whole months. Her body has suffered many injuries but none of her vital organs were hit, although most of her tendons and her larynx have been severed. When she wakes up, her prognosis is that she will never be able to live a normal life again, nor will she able to speak. The head of SDCD gently question Yomi about the death of Mei, but it is difficult to communicate what truly happened due to her condition and the turmoil the killing has left Yomi in. Her uncle accuses her of having killed Mei because Yomi lost her position in the family and the right to carry Shishio, which he takes from her once again. Nori's father dissolves the engagement and forces his son to forget about her, both because of the responsibility he has towards his family, as well as to avoid having to spend his life next to someone with such serious physical disabilities. Yomi receives the news when Nori's father visits her at the hospital, right after having seen how deeply Kagura is hurt by knowing that Yomi really killed Mei. The two blows -having, in her mind, shattered Kagura's trust in her and the dissolution of her engagement to Nori- make her come undone. It is right at that time when Kazuhiro appears and offers her the Sesshōseki stone that will heal her broken body and grant her wishes... but only those born from hate. For Yomi that offer is impossible to resist. Kagura, after regaining her resolved to be at Yomi's side, goes back to her hospital room only to find it empty.
10	"The Other Side of the Tragedy"; Transliteration: "Higeki no Ura" (Japanese: 悲劇裏)	Masaharu Tomoda	Katsuhiko Takayama	December 7, 2008
The timeline reaches the first events of the first two episodes. The team is called to take care of the Category B in the city while wondering what has happened with Yomi. The call finds Nori investigating the site where Yomi was found, his plan is to find who hurt her, reestablish her name and go back to her, no matter what his father says. From what he finds at the site, he comes to the conclusion that someone is orchestrating everything that's been happening in the last several months, when spiritual beings of all kinds have been appearing more and more. With the Kasha defeated by Kagura and Yomi making her appearance as her healthy, katana-welding self -she got Shishio back by killing her uncle- Nori and Kagura follow her in the service tunnels below ground. They split up and Yomi shows up before Nori with Ranguren by her side, holding a wounded Kazuki in its fangs. He throws a spike at Nori and tells him to kill her. She tells him to kill her over and over again, while torturing Kazuki until she eventually kills him. Nori is frozen in horror, not capable to believe the Yomi in front of him is the person he loves, unable to find the strength to kill her. Yomi leaves a shocked Nori behind and goes to find Kagura in the other tunnel. They fight briefly and blow up the tunnel. When Kagura resurfaces, Yomi is already there to face her, and Ranguren also traps her in her fangs. Yomi is ready to slash her with Shishio while Kagura in disbelief can only ask "why?" over and over again, when Kagura's father appears.
11	"Turmoil of Fates"; Transliteration: "Unmei no Midare" (Japanese: 運命乱)	Atsushi Ōtsuki	Katsuhiko Takayama	December 14, 2008
Kagura's father is severely wounded by Yomi when he sends Byakuei to shield his daughter from one of Ranguren's attacks. Confronted with the head of the SDCD and feeling the debilitating effect of her Sesshōseki, Yomi retreats allowing Kagura's father to be rushed to the hospital. His wounds are taken care of but, back in their family home, they both realize that his time is up, that he's too weak to control the soul-eating Byakuei. For the first time her father speaks to Kagura from the heart, admitting that their family's destiny is a harsh one, recognizing that her life must have been difficult, and confessing that he did all that because he wanted her to become strong as fast as possible. Finally he asks Kagura for forgiveness. Meanwhile, the remaining members of the SDCD confront Yomi with dire losses. After their heartfelt conversation, her father entrusts his Sesshōseki to Kagura who will forever share her soul with Byakuei. Her only task now: dealing with Yomi.
12	"Yearning Prayer"; Transliteration: "Inori no Kogare" (Japanese: 祈焦)	Ei Aoki	Katsuhiko Takayama	December 21, 2008
Thanks to intel from surviving PDCH members, Kagura and the remaining SDCD members pursue Yomi with the intent of stopping her once and for all. Before the two girls face off, Kagura apologizes to Yomi for not having fully been at her side when she needed it the most, allowing her to be vulnerable to Kazuhiro's offer. Yomi fights counting on Kagura's recluctance to kill her and gets the upper hand, when Nori appears to assist Kagura retreat after being wounded. Nori has realized that who is facing them is no longer Yomi. This helps Kagura make one of the hardest choices she ever made, kill the person she considered her sister. Wounded to death, in a flashback Yomi is making a wish to her Sesshōseki: her deepest desire is to eliminate the cause of Kagura's pain, even if the cause was herself. Two years later, life continues for the surviving SDCD members. Kagura prepares to face a large spirit being at the Tokyo Tower with her new partner Kensuke Nimura.
