= Defection (song) =

Single by Minori Chihara
- Released: February 9, 2011 (Japan)
- Genre: Techno, J=rock
- Length: 14:19
- Label: Lantis
- Songwriter(s): Daisuke Kikuta *Masami Okui

Minori Chihara singles chronology
"Ittōsei" (2010)	"Defection" (2011)	"Key for Life" (2011)

"Defection" is the 11th CD single by Minori Chihara. It was released simultaneously with her 12th single, "Key for Life." The single ranked 9th on the Oricon charts in the week it debuted.

== Track listing ==
1. Defection
2. Raison pour la saison
3. Fukakutei Seigenri (不確定性原理, lit. Uncertainty Principle)
