= Freedom Dreamer =

Single by Minori Chihara
- Released: July 21, 2010 (Japan)
- Genre: Pop rock
- Length: 14:41
- Label: GloryHeaven
- Songwriter(s): Minori Chihara, Daisuke Kikuta

Minori Chihara singles chronology
| "'Yasashii Bōkyaku'" (2010) | "Freedom Dreamer" (2010) | "'Ittōsei'" (2010) |

Freedom Dreamer is the ninth CD single by Minori Chihara. The single was released under GloryHeaven, a joint label division between Lantis and Sony Music Distribution (Japan) Inc. and placed ninth on the Oricon charts in the month it debuted.

== Track listing ==
1. "Freedom Dreamer" lyrics by Minori Chihara, music by Daisuke Kikuta (Elements Garden)
2. "Best mark smile"
3. "Natsuiro Hanabi" (夏色華日)
