= Heroine (Minori Chihara album) =

Studio album by Minori Chihara
- Released: December 22, 2004 (Japan)
- Genre: Anisong, J-pop, game music
- Length: 37:00
- Label: King Records

Minori Chihara chronology
Heroine (2004)	Contact (2007)

Heroine is the first solo album by Japanese singer Minori Chihara.

== Track listing ==
1. "Majokko Megu-chan" (魔女っ子メグちゃん, lit. "Magical Girl Megu-chan")
2. "Jellybeans"
3. "Marionetto" (マリオネット, lit. "Marionette")
4. "Kasa no Shita" (傘の下, lit. "Under the Umbrella")
5. "Namida no Kinenbi" (涙の記念日, lit. "Anniversary of Tears")
6. "Naked Heart"
7. "Emotional"
8. "Konayuki: Long Distance" (粉雪～long distance～, lit. "Powdered Snow: Long Distance")
9. "Marionetto (Remix)" (マリオネット(Remix), lit. "Marionette (Remix)")
