= D-Formation =

Studio album by Minori Chihara
- Released: February 29, 2012
- Genres: Techno, Darkwave, Anisong
- Label: Lantis

Minori Chihara chronology
Sing All Love (2010)	D-Formation (2012)	Neo Fantasia (2013)

D-Formation is the fifth full-length studio album released by J-pop singer Minori Chihara. It was released on February 29, 2012.

== Track listing ==
No.	Title	Length
1.	"D-Formation"
2.	"Dream Wonder Formation"
3.	"嘘ツキParadox"
4.	"Metamorphosing Door"
5.	"Planet Patrol"
6.	"Key for Life"
7.	"この世界のモノでこの世界の者でない"
8.	"X-Day"
9.	"Defection"
10.	"暁月夜"
11.	"Terminated"
12.	"夢のMirage"
13.	"Freedom Dreamer"
