= Lemon Angel Project =

Japanese anime television series

レモン エンジェル プロジェクト (Remon Enjeru Purojekuto)
- Genre: Drama
- Anime television series
- Directed by: Daisuke Chiba
- Written by: Masashi Takimoto
- Music by: Akira Sasaki
- Studio: Radix Ace Entertainment
- Original network: AT-X, KBS Kyoto, Tokyo MX
- Original run: January 6, 2006 – March 31, 2006
- Episodes: 13

Lemon Angel Project (レモン エンジェル プロジェクト, Remon Enjeru Purojekuto) is a 13-episode Japanese anime series very loosely based on the 80's J-pop Idol group Lemon Angel. It is the second anime to be based on the group after the 1987–88 Fuji TV late night anime Lemon Angel, which was also a spin-off to the adult OVA series Cream Lemon.

== Plot ==
The series is set in the year 2017, and music is delivered in a technological fashion. Previously a pop band named Lemon Angel made it big, but they only performed in large flat screens that serve as ad spaces in the city. After a while, the band disappeared, leaving no trace. Tomo Minaguchi, whose deceased senpai was somehow involved with Lemon Angel, was invited to join an audition aimed to form a new Lemon Angel band, or revive it with new members. Tomo reluctantly agrees.

As the series progresses, Tomo bonds with the other four members of the band (out of the audition), and along the way, each learn the values of trust, friendship and inner strength, as they do their best to perform for the Lemon Angel Project.

== Characters ==
=== Main ===
Tomo Minaguchi (皆口 智, Minaguchi Tomo)
Voiced by: Ryou Shihono
Tomo is the protagonist of the series and lead singer of the Lemon Angels. She has light blue hair with a cowlick and two long pigtails. Very squeaky-voiced, clumsy, and loves to eat. She's not that good coming into the Project, but gained both singing and dancing skills as the series progressed. It is revealed that Yui created the former Lemon Angels lead singer Anne in her image. Tomo is best friends with Saya and Erika.

Saya Yuuki (結城 早夜, Yuuki Saya)
Voiced by: Ami Koshimizu
Saya is Tomo's best friend and a Lemon Angel. She has red hair done in pigtails. She was once a magazine model and a cosplay model at the same time, but left both jobs to pursue a life of singing. She states that she wants to sing to make others happy. Although she is assertive and stuck up, she has inner feelings (best friend) for Tomo and Erika and is quick to defend them against hostile rivals. She is a horrible cook, as shown in episode eight when she made the other Lemon Angels sick from her cooking.

Erika Campbell (エリカ·キャンベル, Erika Kyanberu)
Voiced by: Minori Chihara
Erika is Tomo's other best friend and a Lemon Angel. Due to her origins, she is tall with dark skin and white hair. This alienation encouraged her to join the casting call for Lemon Angel so that she can become part of a group. Erika was the first to befriend Tomo and forcefully helped Saya even though she repeatedly rejected it. She always sticks up for Tomo and Saya and wants everyone to stop fighting and to become friends. She came to live in Japan from Brazil with her adopted brother Takumi, who later became a famous rock star of the band Third Sence. She was constantly picked on by her peers (except for her friends) for being a foreigner and not knowing anything about Japanese culture even though she sometimes dresses up as a ninja. She was manipulated in episode 4 by Haruka and the other unnamed characters to meet Takumi when it turned out he was unavailable to meet them. Erika is half Brazilian from her father's side while her mother is Japanese. She is also a great cook.

Miru Nagisa (渚砂 みる, Nagisa Miru)
Voiced by: Mai Kadowaki
Miru is one of the new Lemon Angels and the smallest of the group. She has long, flowing black hair, and seems to dress in the Gothic Lolita style. Very soft spoken and does not talk or sing unless she really needs to. She lost her parents in a fire at a young age and became a hikkikomori until she listened to the Lemon Angels. From that day forward, she wanted to become just like Anne, the lead singer for the last group. With this she was determined to become the lead singer of the newly formed Lemon Angels but withdrew from her desires once she discovered that Tomo was just like Anne and deserved to be lead singer instead.

Fuyumi Sakakibara (榊原 冬美, Sakakibara Fuyumi)
Voiced by: Juri Hirama
Fuyumi is one of the Lemon Angels. Has short brown hair and is a meganekko. She grew up as a successful child actress and acted with Haruka, but as she got older, she went more into singing and volunteering. She is very shy and has a heavy conscience. She is also a good cook with a particular fondness for doughnuts which she normally carries around.

Miki Suwa (諏訪 美希, Suwa Miki)
Voiced by: Miki Maruyama
Miki is the leader of the group and a Lemon Angel, although she did not try out for the role. She helped create the Project with Yui and was good friends with her (just like Tomo). She is very strict on the outside but deep down inside she is very caring for the other Angels. Due to her excellent programing skills and involvement with the previous Lemon Angels, Miki has a history with Shinya and an openly hostile one at that.

=== Supporting ===
Ryouta Kogure (小暮 亮太, Kogure Ryouta)
Voiced by: Hideki Ogihara
Kogure is the producer of the new Lemon Angels who also worked with Yui with the previous Lemon Angels Project (L.A.P.). He decided to create a second Lemon Angels in order to fulfill Yui's dreams of having real people sing her songs with Tomo as the lead vocalist.

Yui Kouno (鴻野 唯, Kouno Yui)
Voiced by: Kaori Shimizu
Yui is the original creator of the Lemon Angel Project and Tomo's senpai. She died from walking in front of a bus after being heartbroken with Shinya's rejection.

Takumi Campbell (タクミ·キャンベル, Takumi Kyanberu)
Voiced by: Kenten Matsui
Takumi is a famous rock star in a band called Third Sence and Erika's little brother. He was adopted into their family when he was still an infant and knew about his past before coming to Japan from Brazil. He is very devoted to Erika and spends as much time with her as he can when he isn't working.

Danny Yamaguchi (ダニー山口, Danī Yamaguchi)
Voiced by: Ken Yamaguchi

Masami Kudou (工藤 正巳, Kudou Masami)
Voiced by: Kenjirō Tsuda

Haruka Sendou (仙道 春香, Sendou Haruka)
Voiced by: Mio Nonose
She is Fuyumi's childhood friend. Very assertive and cares about herself and pushing others down. She tried out to become a Lemon Angel but gave up in episode 5 after a brief but tense stiff with one of the dance coordinators. After that, she continues to be Fuyumi's friend and confidant.

Keiko Shikina (識名 蛍子, Shikina Keiko)
Voiced by: Sachiko Kojima
Keiko is the Lemon Angel's temporary manager. She used to be Saya's manager at the magazine company but was fired after her involvement with Saya's defection.

Takeshi Muroi (室井 毅, Muroi Takeshi)
Voiced by: Satoshi Tsuruoka

Hitoshi Katagiri (片桐 仁, Katagiri Hitoshi)
Voiced by: Shinji Kawada

Katsuya Kousaka (香坂 克也, Kousaka Katsuya)
Voiced by: Shintarou Oohata

Shinya Himuro (氷室 慎也, Hirumo Shinya)
Voiced by: Takehito Koyasu
Shinya is the producer hired by Nouvelle when they thought that the first Lemon Angels will be a big hit. Shinya flirts with Yui since she is a great programmer and its original creator. Shinya was the cause of Yui's death when he declined Yui's love claiming that he only cares for her because of her programming abilities and nothing more. Yui was hit by a bus later that evening while walking out on the streets. Despite what he said, Shinya deep down did care for Yui but he felt that his experience and her programing skills were only tools and nothing can come from that.

== Episode list ==
No.	Title	Original release date
1	"Angel Awoken from A Dream"; Transliteration: "Yume Kara Mezameta Tenshi" (Japanese: 夢から覚めた天使)	January 6, 2006
Tomo talks to Miki at school. Miki becomes frustrated with her loquacity and tells Tomo never to speak to her again. Later, Tomo meets Kogure, who asks her to audition for the new Lemon Angel. She reluctantly agrees. She then slips away from Kogure and accidentally finds out a secret about the first Lemon Angel...!
2	"Evolution" (Japanese: Evolution)	January 13, 2006
3	"I will" (Japanese: I will)	January 20, 2006
4	"Smile means love" (Japanese: Smile means love)	January 27, 2006
5	"Better Off as Friends"; Transliteration: "Tomodachi de Ii Kara" (Japanese: 友達でいいから)	February 3, 2006
6	"Promise you" (Japanese: Promise you)	February 10, 2006
7	"I Want To Know You"; Transliteration: "Anato wo Shiritai" (Japanese: あなたを知りたい)	February 17, 2006
8	"Angels of The Summer Resort's Forest"; Transliteration: "Hishochi no Mori no Tenshitachi" (Japanese: 避暑地の森の天使たち)	February 24, 2006
9	"Symphony Of Sorrow"; Transliteration: "Aishuu no Shinfonī" (Japanese: 哀愁のシンフォニー)	March 3, 2006
10	"Blue Station"; Transliteration: "Aoi Sutasion" (Japanese: 青いスタスィオン)	March 10, 2006
11	"Immoral Scenario"; Transliteration: "Haitoku no Shinario" (Japanese: 背徳のシナリオ)	March 17, 2006
12	"New Moon"; Transliteration: "Mikazuki" (Japanese: ミカヅキ)	March 24, 2006
13	"Never give up" (Japanese: Never give up)	March 31, 2006

== Music ==
Opening Theme:

- "Angel addict": Eps. 01 - 05
  Performed by: Ryou Shihono, Ami Koshimizu, Miki Maruyama
- "Angel addict": Ep. 06
  Performed by: Mai Kadowaki
- "Angel addict": Ep. 07
  Performed by: Juri Hirama
- "Angel addict": Ep. 08
  Performed by: Ryou Shihono
- "Angel addict": Ep. 09
  Performed by: Minori Chihara
- "Angel addict": Ep. 10
  Performed by: Ami Koshimizu
- "Angel addict": Ep. 11
  Performed by: Miki Maruyama
- "Angel addict": Ep. 12
  Performed by: Kaori Shimizu, Ryou Shihono
- "Angel addict": Ep. 13
  Performed by: Ryou Shihono, Mai Kadowaki, Ami Koshimizu, Minori Chihara, Juri Hirama, Miki Maruyama

Ending Theme:

- " ? " (Girls in Love〜コイスルキモチ〜, Girls in Love~Koi suru Kimochi~)
  Lyrics by: Shouko Fujibayashi
  Composition by:
  Arrangement by:
  Performed by: Nao Nagasawa

Insert Theme:

- "EVOLUTION" (First Lemon Angel version) - Ep. 01
- " ? " (JUMP 〜伝説の騎士〜, JUMP ~Densetsu no Kishi~) by Third Sense - Ep. 04
- "SCAR" by Shinya Himuro - Ep. 07
- "NEVER GIVE UP" (Second Lemon Angel version) - Ep. 13

== Soundtracks ==
Lemon Angel Project: Theme song - "Never Give Up Evolution"

1. 1: "NEVER GIVE UP"
2. 2: "L.A.P CLIMAX DIALOGUE"
3. 3: "EVOLUTION"
4. 4: "NEVER GIVE UP (Karaoke ver.)"
5. 5: "EVOLUTION (Karaoke ver.)"

Lemon Angel Project: Character song 1

1. 1: Saya: "I will"
2. 2: Miki: "Mikazuki"
3. 3: Saya: "I will (Karaoke ver.)"
4. 4: Miki: "Mikazuki (Karaoke ver.)"
5. 5: Lemon Angel message

Lemon Angel Project: Character song 2

1. 1: Miru: "Promise you"
2. 2: Tomo: "Watashi wo sagashite"
3. 3: Miru: "Promise you (Karaoke ver.)"
4. 4: Tomo: "Watashi wo sagashite (Karaoke ver.)"
5. 5: Lemon Angel message

Lemon Angel Project: Character song 3

1. 1 Erika: "Smile means love"
2. 2 Fuyumi: "Kaze no youni"
3. 3 Erika: "Smile means love (Karaoke ver.)"
4. 4 Fuyumi: "Kaze no youni (Karaoke ver.)"
5. 5 Lemon Angel message
