= Neo Fantasia =

Studio album by Minori Chihara
- Released: December 11, 2013
- Genre: J-pop
- Label: Lantis

Minori Chihara chronology
D-Formation (2012)	Neo Fantasia (2013)

Neo Fantasia is the sixth full-length studio album by J-pop singer Minori Chihara. It was released on December 11, 2013.

== Track listing ==
No.	Title	Length
1.	"The immortal kingdom"
2.	"TREASURE WORLD"
3.	"SELF PRODUCER"
4.	"TOON→GO→ROUND!"
5.	"1st STORY"
6.	"endless voyage"
7.	"真白き城の物語"
8.	"Celestial Diva"
9.	"Lonely Doll"
10.	"この世界は僕らを待っていた"
11.	"ZONE//ALONE"
12.	"境界の彼方"
13.	"NEO FANTASIA"
14.	"Neverending Dream"
