= Precious One =

Single by Minori Chihara
- Released: December 23, 2009 (Japan)
- Genre: J-rock, gothic
- Length: 19:40
- Label: GloryHeaven
- Songwriter(s): Miki Fujisue *Saori Kodama

Minori Chihara singles chronology
"'Tomorrow's Chance'" (2009)	"Precious One" (2009)	"'Yasashii Bōkyaku'" (2010)

Precious One is the seventh CD single by Minori Chihara. The single was released under GloryHeaven, a joint label division between Lantis and Sony Music Distribution (Japan) Inc. and placed 5th on the Oricon charts in the month it debuted.

== Track listing ==
1. "Precious One"
2. "Ai to Knife" (愛とナイフ, lit. "Love and Knife")
3. "animand〜agitato"
4. "Sutera Suteeji" (ステラステージ, lit. "Stella Stage")
