= List of Dragonaut: The Resonance episodes =

The cover of the first DVD compilation released by Konami showing the characters Jin on the left and Toa on the right.

Dragonaut: The Resonance is an anime series directed by Manabu Ono and produced by G.D.H., Konami, and Nihon Ad Systems, with the animation produced by Gonzo. A manga adaptation of the series, published by Shueisha, is serialized in the Japanese shōnen manga magazine Jump Square. The plot of the episodes follows Jin Kamishina and his adventures with the dragon Toa, and the conflict between the dragons of Earth and their pilots, known as the Dragonauts, and the extraterrestrial entity named Thanatos.

The episodes premiered in Japan on TV Tokyo between October 3, 2007, and March 26, 2008. The episodes were also broadcast on TV Aichi, TV Hokkaido, TV Osaka, TV Setouchi, AT-X, and TVQ Kyushu Broadcasting Co., although the episodes aired first on TV Tokyo. An OVA episode was produced after the television series was broadcast and is included in the DVD collections as a twenty-sixth episode. However, rather than being a continuation of the story from the television series, it is a stand-alone episode. Nine DVD compilations with consecutive monthly releases were released in Japan by Konami. The first of which was released on January 23, 2008, with the last volume being released on September 24, 2008.

Funimation Entertainment acquired the license to distribute the anime series in North America in 2009 and has subsequently released several DVD collections and also streams all episodes of the series online.

== Episode list ==
=== Dragonaut: The Resonance (TV) ===
No.	Title	Original release date
1	"Resonance -Hand in Hand-"; Transliteration: "Kyōmei —Tsunaida Te—" (Japanese: 共鳴 —つないだ手—)	October 3, 2007
Two years ago Jin Kamishina survived a shuttle accident that killed the rest of his family, causing in him to live out the rest of his life alone. Meanwhile Earth faces possible destruction from an asteroid, and thus the ISDA works on "D-Project" to stop it. In a facility Kazuki Tachibana, Jin's old friend, is tested for his compatibility with a Dragon, which is a success. Elsewhere, Jin witnesses a strange creature almost kill a woman. The creature goes after and eventually catches up to him, causing Jin to fall out of a window. However, Jin is saved by a mysterious girl who is able to fight off the monster. When Jin wakes up, the girl introduces herself as Toa.
2	"Tryst -The World Starts Moving-"; Transliteration: "Ōse —Ugokidasu Sekai—" (Japanese: 逢瀬 —動き出す世界—)	October 10, 2007
Jin suddenly wakes up in an ISDA room, where he is questioned about the shuttle accident two years ago. He is also told the truth about the asteroid Thanatos, in which extraterrestrial life called Dragons came to Earth from Thanatos. Hearing that one of these Dragons was the cause of the shuttle accident, he asks them to tell this to the public, but they deny his request and instead ask him to become a Dragonaut, which he rejects. He then meets his old friend, Kazuki, who now works for the ISDA. Later, Jin runs away from the ISDA to meet with Toa, but their reunion is cut short when the ISDA attempts to capture her. During their attempt, one of their own, Spirytus, transforms into a Dragon and attacks Jin. In order to protect Jin, Toa, known as the "Album", reveals that she too can transform into a Dragon.
3	"Awakening -Wings Gathered-"; Transliteration: "Kakusei —Tsudoishi Tsubasa—" (Japanese: 覚醒 —集いし翼—)	October 17, 2007
Toa and Spirytus continue their battle, but afraid that they might cause some damage, the ISDA sends out Howlingstar, Machina, and Amadeus, who transform into Dragons, controlled by their Pilots, Raina Cromwell, Akira Sōya, and Sieglinde Baumgard, respectively. Toa manages to hold her own, which is when Gio, Kazuki's Dragon, arrives on the scene, having previously been awakened by one of Toa's shock waves during the battle. Gio transforms into a Dragon to help Toa, and Jin hops on his back so he can try to help also. As the two reaches Toa, Jin sees a vision where Toa tells him that she can no longer be with him, which is when Gio shows up to tell Toa that he was created in order to protect her. Howlingstar's attack returns them to reality. Then, Toa accidentally knocks Howlingstar onto Gio, plunging Gio and Jin into the ocean.
4	"Flight -To the End of the Blue-"; Transliteration: "Hishō —Ao no Hate e—" (Japanese: 飛翔 —青の果てへ—)	October 24, 2007
During an ISDA meeting, the D-Project's secrecy is brought up. Meanwhile, Jin and Gio discuss what Toa means to them. Jin then hears Toa singing, which he realizes is coming from the Moon. Later, Machina and Akira come across Gio who is apprehending Jin, so they bring the two back to the ISDA. As Jin is being questioned by Akira, Gio explains his actions to Baisil Sakaki, the Dragonauts' military commander. As Gio is being escorted to Yuuri Kitajima, he escapes, and Jin is also revealed to have escaped. Akira realizes that Jin and Gio planned their capture, in order to get a pod necessary for Jin to go into space with Gio. After Gio's brief scuffle with Machina, Akira's dragon, Gio transforms and Jin attaches the pod to Gio's neck. They then fly off towards the Moon in hopes of finding Toa.
5	"Mingle -The Rain Starts Falling-"; Transliteration: "Kōsaku —Furidashita Ame—" (Japanese: 交錯 —降り出した雨—)	October 31, 2007
A flashback sequence shows how the Gillard military tried a Resonance program five years ago, but it ended in failure. Presently, on the Moon, Gio decides to abandon Jin believing that he was wrong about Toa being there, not realizing that they have just missed her. Meanwhile, back on Earth, the ISDA publicly reveals the truth about the D-Project and Thanatos. In the lunar city, Jin is captured by Garnet MacLaine, and in order to lure Gio in, she sends a secret broadcast about Jin's capture, but in a frequency which only dragons can hear. After accidentally seeing Toa in a video, Gio decides to go save him. During his attempt, Gio battles Garnet while being weakened by a machine, but as Jin tries to escape, he destroys the machine. Gio then saves Jin and transforms into a dragon, flying off as Toa, who had also gone to help Jin, watches.
6	"Reunion -Feelings of Attraction-"; Transliteration: "Saikai —Hikareau Omoi—" (Japanese: 再会 —惹かれあう想い—)	November 7, 2007
During a flashback, it is revealed that Jin had been operated on after the shuttle accident, during which Kitajima, an ISDA researcher, claims to have noticed signs of a Resonance. In present time, Raina, Akira, and Sieglinde travel to the Moon in order to capture Toa. Back on the Moon, Toa is encouraged by a coffee shop owner, named Shelly, to not deny her feelings, so she decides to go look for Jin. When she finally finds Jin and Gio, Howlingstar, Machina, and Amadeus arrive in order to capture her. Gio interferes and fights Howlingstar, and as Amadeus takes Jin to Sieglinde, Machina asks Toa why they were born, to which Toa replied that it is all due to fate. Later, Akira suggests to Sieglinde that she be the one to take him to the spaceport. However, Akira instead drives him to where Toa is, and the two are once again reunited.
7	"Recollections -Hearts Reflected on the Water-"; Transliteration: "Tsuioku —Suimen ni Utsurishi Kokoro—" (Japanese: 追憶 —水面に映りし心—)	November 14, 2007
After finally reuniting, Jin, Gio, and Toa receive tickets for a spa resort, where Jin and Toa deepen their relationship, while Gio continues to wonder about his purpose. Unbeknown to them, the Lindworm Unit, with the exception of Raina, who is secretly meeting with Garnet, go to the spa group to search for them. After being spotted, the two groups engage in a battle that breaks the pool's floor, resulting in their separation through underground waterways. Past memories allow Sieglinde to soften up to Jin, and the two are later found by Gio, who was working with the others in order to find Toa; both groups reunite. Meanwhile, back on Earth, Kazuki once again meets Widow, who is actually a Communicator. She allows Kazuki to become her Pilot, and they fly off into space.
8	"Parting -An Echo Out of Thin Air-"; Transliteration: "Betsuri —Kokū Yori no Hibiki—" (Japanese: 別離 —虚空よりの響き—)	November 21, 2007
After escaping from the spa resort, Jin expresses how the three of them can just live peacefully in some small town back on Earth. Despite Toa's desire to do so, she has a "mission" to fulfill, so she abandons Jin and Gio while they are asleep. Jin later tries searching for her, but is thwarted when Kazuki and Widow show up. After Gio frees himself from Widow's clutches, he picks up Jin and runs off. Meanwhile, Toa surrenders herself to Raina. Kazuki then offers to help Jin get Toa back if Jin agrees to give him Gio. His hesitation prompts Kazuki to send Widow to retrieve Toa. Gio asks if Jin can protect Toa, and after hearing that Jin can, Gio realizes that he has been getting between Toa and Jin all along. Once Toa is brought to the table in exchange for Gio, Toa refuses to go back to him, and reveals the secret she has kept from Jin.
9	"Determination -Overcoming the Gale-"; Transliteration: "Ketsui —Shippū o Koete—" (Japanese: 決意 —疾風を越えて—)	November 28, 2007
In a flashback, it is revealed that when the shuttle exploded two years ago, Sakaki's wife and daughter had been on board. In present time, the Lindworm Unit captures Jin, Gio, and Toa. Meanwhile, Garnet and the Gillard military realize the Resonance data they received from Raina in exchange for giving up their search for Gio is a fake, so she later attacks the shuttle carrying the trio. A fourth Dragon from the Vritra Unit saves the Lindworm Unit. As enemies board the shuttle containing the trio, Gio actualizes with Jin as his pilot. They quickly destroy most of the enemy's forces, and then saves the shuttle that was entering the Earth's atmosphere. Later, Toa is welcomed to the ISDA by Sakaki, who introduces her to her "comrade", a Dragon inside a large tube.
10	"Truth -A Shattered Mirror-"; Transliteration: "Shinjitsu —Kudaketa Kagami—" (Japanese: 真実 —砕けた鏡—)	December 5, 2007
During an ISDA meeting, the current situations of all parties are discussed. Meanwhile, Gio and Widow are confined in a facility that prevents them from leaving. At the ISDA base, Kitajima tells Jin that he had resonated with Toa two years ago. Elsewhere, Garnet is trying to apologize for her failures to Prince Asim Jamar, but he is now more interested in obtaining Toa. Toa later attempts to retrieve some dragon eggs, but Kasuga Nozaki's glowing eyes make her hesitate, giving Amadeus a chance to knock her unconscious. Akira and Machina uses the distraction to free Jin, and Raina and Howlingstar's attempt to stop them fails. Later, when the ISDA decide to transport Toa, they are attacked by the Gillard military. Nanami Hoshi, an ISDA researcher, then reveals herself to be a spy for the Gillard military.
11	"Rumblings -In Search of the Truth-"; Transliteration: "Meidō —Shinjitsu o Motomete—" (Japanese: 鳴動 —真実を求めて—)	December 12, 2007
After escaping, Jin, Akira, and Machina take refuge in an abandoned house. Meanwhile, Toa has been captured by the Gillard military. Kitajima, who was left behind by Hoshi, swims to Tartarus in order to contact the ISDA and inform them of Toa's capture. On board a space station, the Vritra Unit is having a briefing on the missile that they plan to use against Thanatos. Toa meanwhile has been delivered to Asim on Mars, but when she attempts to tell him the consequences for capturing her, he ignores her, being more interested in seeing her true form. Later, a fourth dragon from Thanatos appears near Earth, and destroys the Vritra Unit's space station. The dragon then enters Earth's atmosphere, where Machina appears to recognize it.
12	"Fierce Attack -The Scorching Messenger-"; Transliteration: "Kyōshū —Shakunetsu no Shisha—" (Japanese: 強襲 —灼熱の使者—)	December 19, 2007
When the fourth original Dragon, dubbed "Ostrum" by the ISDA, suddenly disappears after wreaking havoc, Nozaki informs the ISDA that Ostrum has resonated with someone. When Ostrum later reappears and overpowers the Lindworm Unit, Akira decides to join in the battle to help her comrades. Meanwhile, Jin is taken to Tartarus by Kō Yonamine, but is obstructed by Kazuki upon his arrival. Back at the ISDA base, Nozaki refuses to answer Kitajima's questions, and has the computer drop the container holding the ISDA's original Dragon sample. Ostrum appears in his Communicator form, and asks Nozaki why he decided to side with humans. Back on Tartarus, Gio is able to actualize and then fly off with Jin. At the same time, Ostrum battles Nozaki, who reveals himself to be the third original Dragon, which Kitajima recognizes as "Atrum".
13	"Visitation -A Guidepost Shown-"; Transliteration: "Kōrin —Shimesareta Dōhyō—" (Japanese: 光臨 —示された道標—)	December 26, 2007
A flashback sequence from ten years ago reveals the origin of the development of the D-Project. In the present, Ostrum continues to do battle with Atrum, and after they both return to their Communicator forms, Nozaki tries to explain why he is protecting humans. Meanwhile on Mars, Toa tries to find ways to escape, but fails. Back on Earth, Ostrum and Nozaki continue their battle, but Ostrum senses Gio, and leaves in order to dispose of him. On Mars, Hoshi decides to free Toa in order to get her to save Earth, but she is shot in the back by Garnet. Figuring out Toa is on Mars, Jin and Gio begin to head toward space, but instead helps destroy Ostrum with the Type-X warhead. However, Gio is injured in the process and they return to Earth.
14	"Friendship -An Altered Future-"; Transliteration: "Hōyū —Tagaeshi Mirai—" (Japanese: 朋友(ほうゆう) —違えし未来—)	January 9, 2008
In a flashback, it is shown that Raina had known Jin's father. Back in the present, Raina and Howlingstar check up on Jin and Gio. Raina offers Jin to be a Dragonaut, but Jin does not believe he deserves to be one. Meanwhile, Nozaki explains his origins and reasons to Kitajima. At another location, Akira talks to Sieglinde, but is interrupted by an ISDA broadcast. Later, Jin and a revived Gio team up with Akira and Machina, and proceed to head into space toward Mars. However, before they can leave Earth, a deranged Kazuki attacks Gio on board Widow, inflicting damage to ISDA structures in the process. Their battle results in Kazuki and Widow being engulfed in an explosion. Jin, Gio, Akira, and Machina then continue to head into space. Meanwhile on Thanatos, a creature awakens.
15	"Embrace -Those Who Call to Each Other-"; Transliteration: "Hōyō —Yobiau Monotachi—" (Japanese: 抱擁 —呼び合う者達—)	January 16, 2008
A flashback of how Asim gained his title twelve years ago is shown. Back in the present, Asim and Toa argue about the nature of the human race. Just when Toa talks about the power love can create, Asim informs her of Jin's arrival. Jin and Gio head toward Toa's location, as Akira and Machina stay behind to fight off the Gillard military fleet. Gio, in his Communicator form, and Jin storms the main building, and eventually arrives in the throne room. Gio is confronted by Garnet while Jin is attacked by Asim. Toa, witnessing this, cries out, resulting in the glass, which surrounds her, to crack. Toa distracts Asim, allowing Jin to punch him, which then distracts Garnet, allowing Gio to knock her out. Jin and Toa embrace as they are reunited once again.
16	"Lamentation -A Fate Torn Asunder-"; Transliteration: "Dōkoku —Hikisakareta Unmei—" (Japanese: 慟哭 —引き裂かれた運命—)	January 23, 2008
A flashback of fifteen years ago reveal that a young Asim had encountered a Dragon Egg which had resonated with him. Back in the present, Garnet releases her true powers and stabs Gio in the stomach. Gio still manages to escape with the others, and ends up in an abandoned facility, where Toa heals Gio's wound. The group then stumbles upon an underground hot spring. There, Gio and Jin bond further, while the women talk about Toa's "stigmata", which signifies a dragon's impending death. Later, Akira performs a wedding-like ceremony for Jin and Toa, but the group is subsequently interrupted by Asim. When Garnet lunges to attack, Akira jumps in her way, and receives a fatal blow. Akira's death causes Machina to go berserk.
17	"Roar -As the Shining Star Burns-"; Transliteration: "Hōkō —Myōjō no Moeshi Toki—" (Japanese: 咆哮 —明星の燃えし時—)	January 30, 2008
When Machina goes berserk, the other members of the Lindworm Unit sense her situation and decide to head to Mars. On Mars, Yonamine tells the Gillard King to remove Asim from his duties as military commander. Meanwhile, Garnet transforms into a Dragon, and knocks out Machina with her tail. Gio, with Toa and Jin in a pod attached to him, easily defeats the Gillard military fleet. As Gio and Garnet do battle, Machina appears in her Dragon form, but is blown away by Garnet. After Gio is hit by an attack meant for Toa, he releases an incredible amount of power, engulfing both Asim and Garnet in the explosion. Jin and Toa are flown to safety by Howlingstar and Amadeus, who have just gotten there. In the final scene, Machina encases herself and Akira in ice.
18	"Tranquility -Everyday, Temporarily-"; Transliteration: "Heion -Karisome no Nichijō-" (Japanese: 平穏 —仮初めの日常—)	February 6, 2008
One year later, with the ISDA under Gillard management, the Dragonauts are divided and hunted down. Since the Gillard King and Sakaki are convinced that Dragons are dangerous, they are hunting down both original and artificially made dragons, save those that are under their command. Also, there is now a new D-Project. Meanwhile, Jin, Gio, and Toa, have been living normal lives in an isolated town for the past year. Sieglinde and Yonamine unexpectedly show up on their doorstep to discuss the ISDA's current standpoint, and Toa tells them that Thanatos would merely leave Earth alone if it gets back its Dragon Eggs. Later, when Toa reaffirms her feelings for Jin, she, along with every other Dragon on Earth, senses something from Thanatos.
19	"Family -Traces of Warmth-"; Transliteration: "Kazoku —Nukumori no Kakera—" (Japanese: 家族 ―温もりの欠片―)	February 13, 2008
Jin, Toa, and Gio's house is burned down by Agathions sent by the ISDA as Yonamine takes the trio to the Baumgard estate, where Sieglinde's father, Wilhelm, agrees to shelter them. Meanwhile, the ISDA continues their experimentations on Dragons in order to figure out the best way to destroy Thanatos, while Laura, Sakaki's Dragon counterpart, captures Itsuki Habaragi and Otohime. Later, the ISDA realizes that their experimentations on artificial Dragons caused them to develop an immunity to the "anti-Thanatos factor", however, it may still work on original Dragons. Back at the Baumgard estate, as the group heads out, Wilhelm offers Sieglinde to stay with him, but she decides that she has somewhere else where she belongs, leaving with the others.
20	"Rescue -Severed Ties-"; Transliteration: "Dakkan —Tachikirareta Kizuna—" (Japanese: 奪還 ―断ち切られた絆―)	February 20, 2008
As Jin and his comrades travel, Gio disappears without telling the others after he senses something from Thanatos. Once they reach the ocean, Jin and company encounter a submarine piloted by Kitajima and Nozaki, who invites them to board. They plan an attack on Tartarus, and as Jin and Toa battle Kazuki and Widow, the others infiltrate the ISDA base, where they find Raina and Itsuki. Nozaki realizes that Sakaki intends to use the "Aegis system" on the captured Dragons. Laura then appears, prompting Nozaki to fight her alone, as Sieglinde finds a way to free the captured Dragons, reuniting with Amadeus. While Howlingstar and Otohime help Jin and Toa, the others check up on Nozaki. As Laura escapes upon seeing the others, she senses something approaching. Gio appears and surprises all by attacking his comrades.
21	"Parting -The Successor-"; Transliteration: "Ketsubetsu —Keishō seshi Mono—" (Japanese: 決別 ―継承せし者―)	February 27, 2008
Gio continues to attack his former comrades by knocking them all out. While Toa is unconscious, Gio tells Jin that he cannot protect Toa, and informs him her impending death. When Toa awakes, she refuses Gio's offer to come with him, but he then tells them that he has become Thanatos's successor. Laura then appears and attacks Gio, but is subsequently knocked out. After Gio takes his leave when Toa refuses his offer again, Toa heals Laura, who is actually "Raum", the final original Dragon from Thanatos, while Sakaki and Jin talk. Later, as Sakaki sees to Laura's health at a facility, they are attacked by soldiers, leading them to run away. Meanwhile, as Toa and Jin reunite with their comrades and try to figure out their next move, Gio makes a decision, one he says that almost can't be done but will have to work, to save Toa.
22	"Attack -The Time of Judgment-"; Transliteration: "Shūrai —Shinpan no Toki—" (Japanese: 襲来 ―審判の時―)	March 5, 2008
As Sieglinde and her comrades camp out in an abandoned building on an island, they stumble upon Sakaki, who has washed up on shore. Meanwhile, the ISDA conducts experiments on Laura, as Kazuki and Widow discuss her situation. At another location, Nozaki tells Kitajima about the purpose of the original Dragons sent to Thanatos. Back on the island, Jin and the others question Sakaki about his motives. Gio later appears to attack Nozaki's location, but Jin's group comes to their rescue, though is incapable of dealing any sufficient damage. Just as Jin confronts Gio, Kazuki and Widow show up, but Widow is subsequently damaged by Gio after she attempts to blast Toa. As Thanatos is shown to be close at hand, Akira and Machina are shown to disappear from their ice tomb.
23	"A Glorious Death -With Sorrow and Hope-"; Transliteration: "Sange —Kanashimi to Kibō to—" (Japanese: 散華 ―悲しみと希望と―)	March 12, 2008
Gio once again advises Jin to let Toa go, then he heads toward Thanatos, which the Gillard military fleet engages into battle with, though subsequently loses. As Jin and Toa spend time together, and as the others think of heading into space, Gio converses with Akira and Machina, who have merged with Thanatos as part of its soul. Later, after Jin finally allows Gio to take Toa, he runs into Kazuki, who is distraught over Widow's recent death. They have a short altercation, and end up reconciling. They later storm the ISDA, aided by Sakaki, who gets shot in the back as he sends off Jin and Kazuki in a shuttle. Laura protects Sakaki from further harm, and as Sakaki loses consciousness while embracing Laura, Nozaki absorbs the anti-Thanatos factor from the two.
24	"Wrath -A Disappearing Tomorrow-"; Transliteration: "Gekirin —Kieyuku Ashita—" (Japanese: 逆鱗 ―消えゆく明日―)	March 19, 2008
After Sieglinde and Raina use the Aegis system to fire a beam towards Thanatos, the entire Dragonaut team, including Jin and Kazuki, are transported into Thanatos, where Akira and Machina greet them. The two explain Thanatos's true nature and its intentions. In disagreement, the Dragonaut team decides to leave, except Jin, who is led to Toa by Gio. Gio then tries to kill Jin in order for the latter to become one with Thanatos as well as be with Toa forever, but Jin avoids his attacks and tries to talk some sense into him. Just as Toa begins to fuse with Thanatos, her love for Jin suddenly reunites them. Intrigued by this, Thanatos, in the form of Garnet and Asim, decide that instead of destroying humanity, it will fuse with it. Jin, Toa, and Gio then leaves Thanatos as it prepares to assimilate with all of humanity.
25	"Resonance -May it Reverberate Forever-"; Transliteration: "Kyōmei —Eien ni Hibikiau yō ni—" (Japanese: 共鳴 ―永遠に響き合うように―)	March 26, 2008
Members of the Dragonaut team attempt to protect as many humans as they can from the billions of Ostrums sent by Thanatos. Meanwhile, Toa, Jin, and Gio try to approach Thanatos since Jin wants to persuade it to stop. Nozaki helps them get through by blowing himself up, taking out massive numbers of dragons in the group's way. Once inside, they are met with the original Ostrum, whom Gio decides to battle himself while Jin and Toa go on ahead. Jin and Toa then encounter Garnet, who sends Jin into a dream world where the shuttle accident never happened, however, Jin is able to snap out of it by following Toa's voice. As Gio is able to defeat Ostrum, the power of Jin and Toa's love for each other results in the deactivation of all the Ostrums, the disappearance of Toa's stigmata, and the appearance of Thanatos, who decides that it will think about the meaning of love as it moves on to the next planet. In the end, Gio leaves for space, and Jin and Toa are able to live on together.

=== Dragonaut: The Resonance (OVA) ===
An additional episode was produced after the television series was broadcast and is included as episode 26 in the DVD collections.

No.	Title	Original release date
26	"LONELY ISLAND: Shut Off from the Din"	December 29, 2009
A side-story episode. The ISDA crew is back in action, but the dragons are acting really strange. Gio is cracking jokes, Howling Star is hiding under tables, and Toa’s sexy growl is driving Jin crazy.

== Music Themes ==
Three pieces of theme music are used for the episodes; one opening theme and two closing themes. The opening theme is "perfect blue," performed by Jazzin' Park and ATSUMI. The first closing theme, "Rain Of Love" performed by Yukari Fukui, is used for the first thirteen episodes. The second theme, "FIGHT OR FLIGHT" performed by Yū Kobayashi, will be used from episode fourteen onwards. A single for "perfect blue" was released on November 21, 2007, and a single for "Rain Of Love" was released on the same date. The single for "FIGHT OR FLIGHT" was released on January 23, 2008.

== See also ==
- List of Dragonaut -The Resonance- characters
