= Key for Life =

Single by Minori Chihara
- Released: February 9, 2011 (Japan)
- Genre: J-Pop
- Label: Lantis
- Songwriter(s): Miki Fujisue, Saori Kodama, Yimiko Uema (Yumiko).

Minori Chihara singles chronology
| "'Defection'" (2011) | "Key for Life" (2011) | "'Planet Patrol'" (2011) |

Key for Life (stylized as KEY FOR LIFE) is the 12th CD single by Minori Chihara. It was released simultaneously with her 11th single, Defection. The single ranked 10th on the Oricon charts in the week it debuted.

== Track listing ==
1. Key for Life
2. Happy Kaleidoscope
3. Hitori ni Hitotsu no Eien (ひとりにひとつの永遠, lit. One to One's Eternity)
