= Tomorrow's Chance =

Single by Minori Chihara
- Released: June 3, 2009 (Japan)
- Genre: Electropop
- Length: 20:49
- Label: GloryHeaven

Minori Chihara singles chronology
"'Paradise Lost'" (2008)	"Tomorrow's Chance" (2009)	"'Precious One'" (2009)

Tomorrow's Chance is the sixth CD single by Minori Chihara. The single was released under GloryHeaven, a joint label division between Lantis and Sony Music Distribution (Japan) Inc. and placed 12th on the Oricon charts in the month it debuted. The limited first edition pressing of the single included a numbered voucher for purchasing reserved seats to her 「Minori Chihara Live 2009 "Summer Camp"」 event, held on August 1 and 2, 2009.

== Track listing ==
1. "Tomorrow's Chance"
2. "Sunshine flower"
3. "Tomorrow's Chance (off vocal)"
4. "Sunshine flower (off vocal)"
