= Yasashii Bōkyaku =

- Yuki Nagato version

Single by Minori Chihara
- Released: February 24, 2010 (Japan)
- Genre: Anisong, neoclassical new age
- Length: 18:36
- Label: Lantis

Minori Chihara singles chronology
| "Precious One" (2009) | "Yasashii Bōkyaku" (2010) | "Freedom Dreamer" (2010) |

Minori Chihara version

"Yasashii Bōkyaku" (優しい忘却; lit. "Tender Oblivion") is the eighth CD single containing four versions of the titular song by Minori Chihara. The single was used as the ending theme to The Disappearance of Haruhi Suzumiya, in which Chihara again reprises her role as Yuki Nagato. It won the Best Singing Award at the fifth annual Seiyu Awards held in 2011 in Tokyo for Chihara's performance. A promotional video for the song, filmed in the Haruhi Suzumiya franchise's real-world parallel setting of Nishinomiya-Kita Prefectural High School, was released January 27, 2010 on Lantis' official YouTube channel.

== Track listing ==
1. "Yasashii Bōkyaku" (優しい忘却; lit. "Tender Oblivion") - 5:39
2. "Yasashii Bōkyaku -sonority-" (優しい忘却 -sonority-; lit. "Tender Oblivion -Sonority-") - 4:33
3. "Yasashii Bōkyaku -sincerity-" (優しい忘却 -sincerity-; lit. "Tender Oblivion -Sincerity-") - 5:11
4. "Yasashii Bōkyaku ~ Aru Hi no Yume" (優しい忘却～或る日の夢; lit. "Tender Oblivion ~ One Day's Dream") - 3:13

== Personnel ==
- Vocals: Minori Chihara
- Lyrics: Aki Hata
- Composition: Masumi Ito
- Arrangement: Nijine
- Original Lyrics: Nagaru Tanigawa

== Oricon chart positions ==
| Chart (2010) | Peak position | Sales |
|---|---|---|
| Daily | 5 | 23,201 |
| Weekly | 8 | 23,201 |

== See also ==
2010 in Japanese music
