= List of Tenjho Tenge music =

This article lists the soundtracks attributed to the series Tenjho Tenge.

== Tenjho Tenge - Great Disc 1 ==
The Tenjho Tenge original soundtracks by various artists. It was arranged by DJ Fumiya and composed by Fumihiko. The album was released in Japan by Avex on September 29, 2004, and was released in North America by Geneon.

| Track | Japanese Title | Translation |
| 1 | Bomb A Head!(TVサイズ) | Bomb A Head! V (TV size) |
| 2 | 天上天下番外編ドラマ「最後のお弁当」前編 | "Last Packed Lunch" Part 1 |
| 3 | 負けない(棗亜夜:茅原実里) | I Won't Give Up |
| 4 | 天上天下(天上天下サウンドトラック) | Tenjho Tenge |
| 5 | 真夜 | Maya |
| 6 | 亜夜 | Aya |
| 7 | 天上天下「宗一郎」篇 | Tenjho Tenge the Chapter "Souichiro" |
| 8 | 友情 | Friendship |
| 9 | 驚異 | Wonder |
| 10 | 田上「武士道」 | Tagami "The Code of the Samurai" |
| 11 | 疾風 | A Gale |
| 12 | 統道学園「聖域」 | Toudou Academy "Sanctuary" |
| 13 | 天上天下「ボブ」篇 | Tenjho Tenge the Chapter "Bob" |
| 14 | 千秋 | Chiaki |
| 15 | 光臣 | Mitsuomi |
| 16 | 哀愁 | Pathos |
| 17 | By your side(鴻ノ池千秋:白石涼子) | By Your Side |
| 18 | 天上天下番外編ドラマ「最後のお弁当」後編 | "Last Packed Lunch" Part 2 |
| 19 | 愛してね♥もっと(TVサイズ)(嘉陽愛子) | Aishitene Motto (Love Me More) |

== Bomb A Head!V ==
Tenjho Tenge Single by the artist m.c.A.T. It was arranged by DJ Fumiya and composed by Akio Togashi. It was released in Japan on August 18, 2004, by Avex.

| Track | Title |
| 1 | Bomb A Head! V |
| 2 | Dry'n Cry |
| 3 | Bomb A Head! V (Instrumental) |
| 4 | Dry'n Cry (Instrumental) |

== Tenjo Tenge Character Collection EXTRA BOUT.1 ==
Tenjho Tenge first character collection album by various artists. It was composed by Yupa. It was released in Japan on January 19, 2005, by Avex.

| Track | Japanese Title | Approx. Translation |
| 1 | 本能の呼吸(凪宗一郎:保志総一朗) | Breathing Instinct (Itirou Hazime Armor: Hoshi Soichiro) |
| 2 | Get up Stand up!(ボブ牧原:三木眞一郎) | Get up Stand up! |
| 3 | 本能の呼吸(INST.) | Breathing Instinct(INST.) |
| 4 | Get up Stand up!(INST.) | Get up Stand up!(INST.) |
| 5 | ドラマ番外編「未来への戦い」前編 | Drama Extra Edition "Fight to the Future" First Volume |

== Tenjo Tenge Character Collection EXTRA BOUT.2 ==
Tenjho Tenge second character collection album by various artists. It was composed by Decky-Kenji. It was released in Japan on January 19, 2005, by Avex.

| Track | Japanese Title | Approx. Translation |
| 1 | Seize the chance(棗真夜:久川綾) | Seize the chance(Jujube true night: Hisashi river twill) |
| 2 | 葛藤(高柳雅考:関智一) | Trouble (Masashi Takayanagi consider: Seki Tomokazu) |
| 3 | Seize the chance(INST.) | Seize the chance(INST.) |
| 4 | 葛藤(INST.) | Trouble(INST.) |
| 5 | ドラマ番外編「未来への戦い」後編 | Drama Extra Edition "fight to the Future" Second Volume |
