= Ameagari no Hana yo Sake =

Single by Minori Chihara
- Released: August 6, 2008 (Japan)
- Genre: Symphonic pop
- Length: 19:36
- Label: Lantis

Minori Chihara singles chronology
| "'Melty tale storage'" (2008) | "Ameagari no Hana yo Sake" (2008) | "'Paradise Lost'" (2008) |

Ameagari no Hana yo Sake (雨上がりの花よ咲け, lit. "Let the Flower Bloom After the Rain") is the fourth CD single by Minori Chihara. The single placed 17th on the Oricon charts in the same month it debuted.

== Track listing ==
1. "Ameagari no Hana yo Sake" (雨上がりの花よ咲け, lit. "Let the Flower Bloom After the Rain")
2. "Say You?"
3. "Ameagari no Hana yo Sake (off vocal)" (雨上がりの花よ咲け (off vocal), lit. "Let the Flower Bloom After the Rain (off vocal)")
4. "Say you? (off vocal)"
