= Minori Chihara =

Japanese voice actress and singer (born 1980)

- 茅原実里
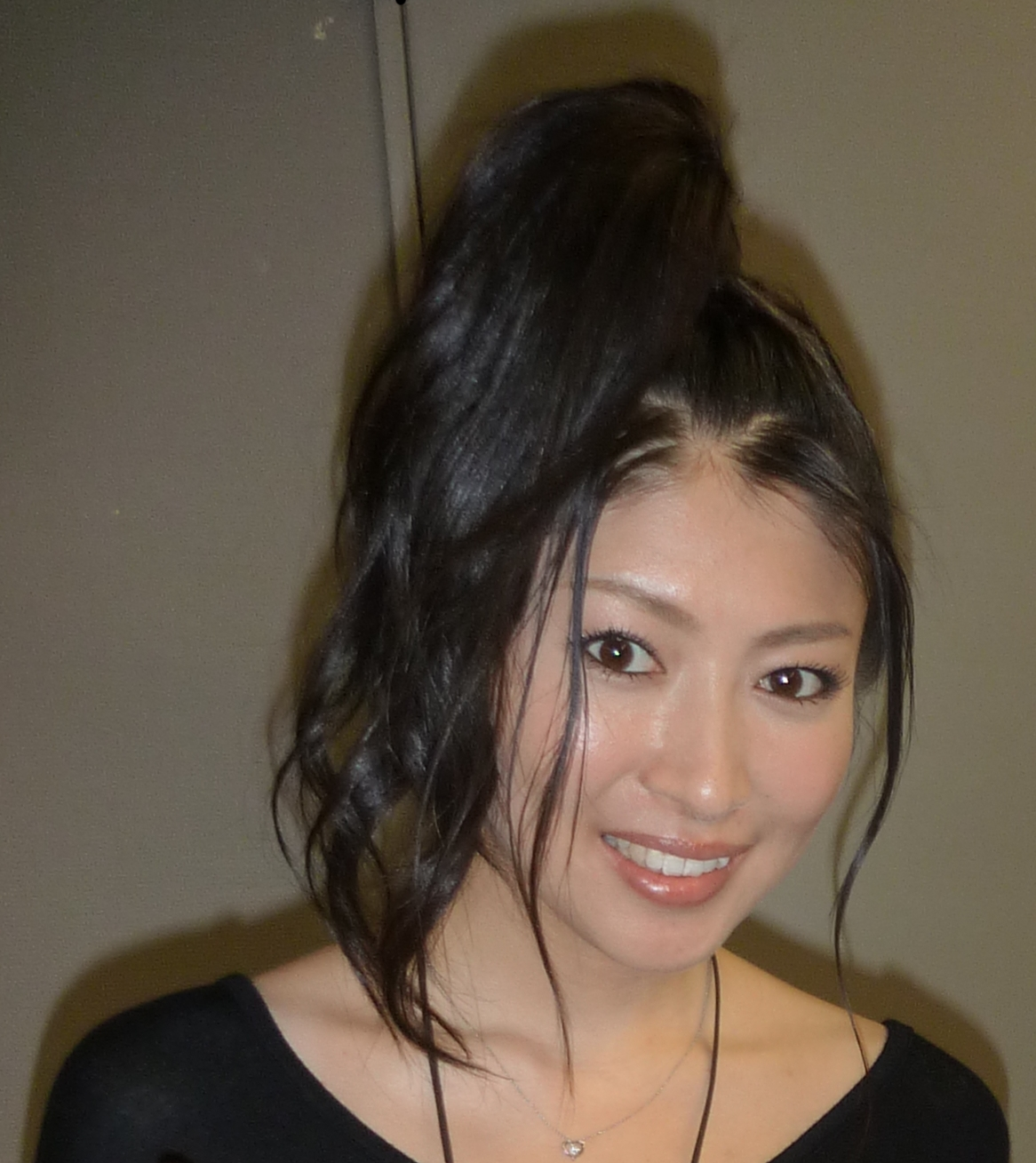
- Chihara after Animelo Summer Live – Rainbow concert on August 27, 2011
- Born: November 18, 1980 (age 45); Utsunomiya, Tochigi Prefecture, Japan
- Occupations: Voice actress; singer
- Years active: 2004–present
- Agent: Avex (2004–2013)
- Notable work: Haruhi Suzumiya series as Yuki Nagato
- Height: 157 cm (5 ft 2 in)
- Musical career
- Genres: J-pop; Anison; symphonic pop; techno
- Instruments: Vocals; guitar
- Labels: King (2004–2007); Lantis (2007–2021)
- Website: minorichihara.com

Minori Chihara (茅原 実里, Chihara Minori; born November 18, 1980) is a Japanese voice actress and singer who has had roles in several anime series. She is well known for her voice role as Yuki Nagato in The Melancholy of Haruhi Suzumiya and Leon in The iDOLM@STER, while in her musical career, she has been signed under King Records and Lantis. She was born in the city of Utsunomiya, Tochigi and was raised in Saitama. She was affiliated with the talent agency HoriPro International.

== Career ==
=== Early years ===
==== 2003 ====
- From April to September, Chihara served as the assistant to Mariko Kōda's OBC radio program Kōda Mariko no GM, a position she gained through an audition. She won first place at the Seiyū Grand Prix Club and the right to work in the avex artist academy.
- In October, she was chosen as one of the top 4 finalists for Pony Canyon, Inc.'s Voice Artist & Singer Audition「VSオーディション2003」 sponsorship contest, but did not win the grand prize.

==== 2004 ====
- From April to September, debuted her voice acting career as Aya Natsume in Tenjho Tenge.
- In December, she began her blog "minorhythm" and at the same time, released her album Heroine

==== 2005 ====
- In April, she began work as a host personality for the internet radio program Oshiyaberi Yattemasu along with Masaya Onosaka and Miyu Matsuki as the Thursday group.
- In May, she began hosting both radio programs Avex presents Chihara Minori no Makenai Radio and Avex presents Chihara Minori no Ikenai Radio.

=== Career from 2006–2015 ===
==== 2006 ====
- Her book minorhythm, based on her blog of the same name, was published in March.
- Chihara voiced the role of Yuki Nagato in The Melancholy of Haruhi Suzumiya for the first time.
- On July 8, she performed with Aya Hirano and Yūko Gotō at Animelo Summer Live 2006 Outride concert.
- In July, The Melancholy of Haruhi Suzumiya's ending theme single "Hare Hare Yukai" sung with Aya Hirano and Yūko Gotō reached gold status.
- In November, received the Radio Kansai Award along with Yūko Gotō

==== 2007 ====
- On January 24, released the single "Junpaku Sanctuary", ending a two-year hiatus from her personal singing career.
- On March 18, performed in the Suzumiya Haruhi no Gekisou concert.
- In May, began the radio program in conjunction to her blog called Radio Minorhythm on Wednesdays as part of the Lantis web radio lineup.
- On June 6, released the single "Kimi ga Kureta Anohi".
- From June 29 to July 2, appeared at Anime Expo 2007 along with Aya Hirano and Yūko Gotō at Long Beach, California as a guest of honor.
- On July 7, performed in the Animelo Summer Live 2007 Generation-A concert.
- On August 16, held a press conference that was broadcast to 115 storefronts across Japan to announce three important news items: the release of her new album Contact on October 24, her tour Live opening on November 18 as part of her birthday concert, and the release of her PV collection DVD slated for December 2007.
- On December 26, released the PV DVD Message 01. A follow-up track to the album Contact titled "Contact 13th" was bundled with the DVD as an extra CD.

==== 2008 ====
- On March 26, released the single "Melty Tale Storage".
- On April 1, her official fanclub m.s.s. (Minori Smile Seasons) was opened.
- On August 6, released the single "Ameagari no Hana yo Sake"
- On August 30, performed at Animelo Summer Live 2008 – Challenge day 1, including a duet with Masami Okui.
- On November 5, released the single "Paradise Lost"
- On November 26, released the album Parade
- On December 7, performed in the Dream Stage concert at the Fancy Frontier convention held in Taipei, Taiwan.

==== 2009 ====
- On March 29, performed in the Lucky Star Concert Called Lucky Star in Budokan -Anata no Tame Dakara- / らき☆すた in 武道館 あなたのためだから.
- From April to October, she again played the role of Yuki Nagato in the Rebroadcasting of The Melancholy of Haruhi Suzumiya.
- On April 29, performed at the Suzumiya Haruhi no Gensō (涼宮ハルヒの弦奏, The Symphony of Haruhi Suzumiya) held at Tokyo Kosei Nenkin Kaikan with music by the Tokyo Philharmonic Orchestra and Philip Chu as conductor.
- On May 3, performed at Ga-Rei Zero – The Live at Shibuya-AX.
- On June 3, released the single "Tomorrow's Chance".
- On July 12, performed in her first ever South East Asian concert in DaiCon 「DaiCon-大コン-」, Multimedia University, Cyberjaya in Malaysia.
- On August 22, performed at Animelo Summer Live 2009 Re:Bridge day 1, including a duet with Yui Horie.
- On December 23, released the single "Precious One".

==== 2010 ====
- On February 4, released the PV DVD Message 02.
- On February 6, she once again played the role of Yuki Nagato in The Disappearance of Haruhi Suzumiya.
- On February 17, released the album Sing All Love.
- On February 24, released the single "Yasashii Bōkyaku"
- On April 10, released the PV DVD Message 03.
- On July 21, released the single "Freedom Dreamer"
- On August 7, released the limited single "Ittōsei"
- On August 29, performed at Animelo Summer Live 2010 Evolution day 2, including a duet with May'n.

==== 2011 ====
- On February 9, released the singles "Defection" and "Key for Life"
- On April 4, released the PV DVD Message 04
- On July 6, released the single "Planet Patrol"
- On August 27, performed at Animelo Summer Live 2011 rainbow day 1, including a duet with Yukari Tamura.
- On October 19, released the single "Terminated"

==== 2012 ====
- On February 29, released the album D-Formation
- On March 21, released the single "Celestial Diva"
- On July 11, released the single "Zone//Alone"
- On August 26, performed at Animelo Summer Live 2012 Infinity day 2, including a duet with Chiaki Ishikawa.
- On October 24, released the single "Self Producer"

2013

- From October to December, played the role of Mitsuki Nase in Beyond the Boundary.

2014

- From April to June, played the role of Miku Izayoi in Date a Live II.

2015

- On April 3, she once again reprised the role of Yuki Nagato in the spin-off series The Disappearance of Nagato Yuki-chan.
- On April 8, she played the role of Kaori Nakaseko in Sound! Euphonium.

=== Career in the 2020s ===
2021

- On April 3, she announced her retirement from singing.
- On December 26, she performed her last concert Minori Chihara the Last Live 2021 Re:Contact.

2022

- On March 31, she announced that she has left HoriPro International.
- On April 1, she opened the YouTube Channel Minorhythm.

2023

- On August 4, she performed her resume concert Chihara Minori LIVE 2023 We are stars!.

2025

- On March 1, her resume digital single "Message" was released.

== Personal life ==
In May 2020, Weekly Flash reported that Chihara was in a six-year relationship with violinist Kōichirō Muroya, who was married at the time. Muroya and Chihara admitted to the relationship, though Muroya claimed they ended their relationship in 2016.

== Filmography ==
=== Anime (films, TV, and web) ===
- Samurai Gun (2004), Ohana
- Tenkuu Danzai Skelter Heaven (2004), Ayaka Matsumoto
- Space Symphony Maetel: Galaxy Express 999 (2004), Arena
- Tenjho Tenge (2004), Aya Natsume
  - Reprised in Tenjho Tenge: Ultimate Fight (2005)
- Mars of Destruction (2005) Kurita Aoi
- My-Otome 0~S.ifr~ (2005–2006), Raquel Mayol
- The Law of Ueki (2005–2006), Memory
- Fushigiboshi no Futagohime (2005), Lulu
- Major (2005), Ayane
- Binbō Shimai Monogatari (2006), Unnamed girl
- Humanoid Monster Bem (Remake) (2006), Mitsuki Kisaragi
- Lemon Angel Project (2006), Erika Campbell
- Lovedol: Lovely Idol (2006), Hina Hōjō
- The Melancholy of Haruhi Suzumiya (2006–2009), Yuki Nagato - Reprised in
  - Lucky Star OVA (2008)
  - Nyoro~n Churuya-san (2009)
  - Suzumiya Haruhi chan no yûutsu (2009)
  - The Disappearance of Haruhi Suzumiya (2010)
  - The Disappearance of Nagato Yuki-chan (2015)
- Murder Princess (Unnamed girl)
- Kyo no Gononi (2007), Tsubasa Kawai
- Claymore (2007), Awakened Being in Ep. 12
- Da Capo II (2007–2008), Shirakawa Nanaka
- Dragonaut -The Resonance- (2007), Toa
- Gakuen Utopia Manabi Straight! (2007), Band leader in Ep. 11
- Ikki Tousen: Dragon Destiny (2007–2014), Chouhi Ekitoku
  - Reprised in Ikki tousen: Extravaganza Epoch (2015)
- Lucky Star (2007) - multiple roles
  - Minami Iwasaki
  - Herself in Ep. 12
  - Waitress, Yuki Nagato in Ep. 16
- Minami-ke (2007–2009, 2013), Chiaki Minami
- Over Drive (2007), Takeshi Yamato's little sister
- Saint October (2007), Seiran in Ep. 6
- Shinkyoku Sōkai Polyphonica (2007), Matia Machiya
- Venus Versus Virus (2007), Sumire Takahana
- Wellber no Monogatari: Sisters of Wellber (2007), Rio
- Ga-rei -Zero- (2008), Kagura Tsuchimiya
  - Reprised in Tokyo ESP (2014)
- The Tower of Druaga (2008–2009), Coopa
- Needless (2009), Kuchinashi
- Saki (2009), Tōka Ryūmonbuchi
- Umineko no Naku Koro ni (2009), Sakutarou
- Chu-Bra!! (2010), Nayu Hayama
- The Qwaser of Stigmata (2010–2011), Teresa Beria
- Occult Academy (2010), Mikaze Nakagawa
- Yumeiro Patissiere SP Professional (2010), Maize
- Mitsudomoe (2010–2011), Airi Ogata
- Asobi ni iku yo! (2010), Lawry
- Nurarihyon no Mago (2010), Sewagakari no Medanuki
- Rio: Rainbow Gate! (2011), Dana
- A Channel (2011), Kimiko Kitō
  - Reprised in the OVA A Channel +smile
- Oniichan no Koto Nanka Zenzen Suki Janain Dakara ne!! (2011), Ran Yatagai
- Horizon on the Middle of Nowhere (2011–2012), Horizon Ariadust
- C³ (2011), Konoha Muramasa
- Hyōka (2012), Yuri Kōnosu
- Busou Shinki Moon Angel (2012), Strarf Mk.2/02
- Queen's Blade Rebellion (2012), Yuit
- Saki Achiga-hen episode of Side-A (2012), Tōka Ryūmonbuchi
- So, I Can't Play H! (2012), Dalnia Earheart
- Busou Shinki – (2012), Strarf Mk.2/Hina
- Oniichan dakedo Ai sae Areba Kankeinai yo ne! (2012), Anastasia Nasuhara
- Sparrow's Hotel (2013), Sayuri Satō
- Beyond the Boundary (2013), Mitsuki Nase - Reprised in the movies:
  - Beyond the Boundary: I'll Be Here – Past (2015)
  - Beyond the Boundary: I'll Be Here – Future (2015)
- Phi Brain: Puzzle of God (2013), Rätsel
- Saki (2014), Tōka Ryūmonbuchi
- Nobunaga the Fool (2014), Ichi-hime
- Date A Live (2014–2022), Miku Izayoi
- Rail Wars! (2014), Noa Kashima
- Cross Ange (2014), Miranda Campbell
- Girl Friend Beta (2014), Mahiro Natsume
- Hibike! Euphonium (2015), Kaori Nakaseko
- Violet Evergarden (2018), Erica Brown
- My Hero Academia (2018–2020), Camie Utsushimi
- Princess Connect! Re:Dive (2020–2022), Tomo / Tomo Mikuma
- Smile of the Arsnotoria the Animation (2022), Lidel

=== Games ===
- Avalon Code (Neaki)
- Azur Lane (Z46)
- Busou Shinki BATTLE RONDO (Strarf)
- étude prologue ～Yureugoku Kokoro no Katachi～ (Asami Hagiwara)
- Granblue Fantasy (Orchis)
- Final Fantasy Type-0 (Cater)
- Final Fantasy Type-0 HD (Cater)
- Haruhi Suzumiya series as Yuki Nagato:
  - The Promise of Haruhi Suzumiya (PSP)
  - The Perplexity of Haruhi Suzumiya (PS2)
  - The Excitement of Haruhi Suzumiya (Wii)
  - The Series of Haruhi Suzumiya (NDS)
  - The Parallel of Haruhi Suzumiya (Wii)
- The Idolmaster One For All (Leon)
- Ikki Tousen series as Chouhi Ekitoku:
  - Ikki Tousen: Shining Dragon (PS2)
  - Ikki Tousen: Eloquent Fist (PSP)
- Lucky ☆ Star: Ryōō Gakuen Ōtōsai (Minami Iwasaki)
- Lux-Pain (Natsuki Venefsukja)
- Mars of Destruction (Aoi Kurita)
- Memories Off No. 5 encore (Akina Ichijo)
- Shōkan Shōjo -ElementalGirl Calling- (Uzuki)
- Summon Night X: Tears Crown (Phara Mir Celestia)
- Tenkuu Danzai Skelter Heaven (Ayaka Matsumoto)
- The Kōshōnin (Lina Hanashita)
- Blaze Union: Story to Reach the Future (Eater, Lapis)
- Princess Connect! Re:Dive (Tomo)
- Rune Factory 3 (Sofia)
- Final Promise Story (Sasha)
- Gloria Union (Raspberry, Eater)
- Otomedius Excellent (Strarf)
- Chaos Rings II (Lessica)
- Disgaea D2: A Brighter Darkness (Barbara)
- Date A Live: Ars Install (Miku Izayoi)
- Another Eden (Cynthia)
- Kirara Fantasia (Mint)
- Girls X Battle (Matador)
- Pokémon Masters EX (Courtney)

=== Drama CD ===
- B Gata H Kei (Kyouka Kanejyou)
- Dragon Nest: Prelude~ Awakening of Fate (Goddess Altea)
- Franken Fran (Veronica Madaraki)
- Lovedol: Lovely Idol (Hina Hōjō)
- The Melancholy of Haruhi Suzumiya: Sound Around (Yuki Nagato)
- My-HiME Destiny (Mayo Kagura)
- Shin Megami Tensei: Devil Survivor (Tanikawa Yuzu)

=== Radio ===
- Kōda Mariko no GM (April to September 2003)
- avex presents Chihara Minori no Makenai Radio (JOQR, Ended)
- avex presents Chihara Minori no Ikenai Radio (JOQR, Ended)
- SOS Dan Radio Shibu (Ended)
- Oshaberi Yattemasu Thursdays (Graduated)
- Chihara Minori radio minorhythm (Still running)
- Chihara Minori's fans Contact (A&G Super RADIO SHOW 〜AniSuper〜: October 6, 2007, to October 27, 2007)
- Ga-rei -Zero- Supernatural Disaster Countermeasure Radio Room (Lantis web radio: October 18, 2008)
- Busou Shinki It is the radio for master. (Onsen web radio: September 24, 2012, still running)

=== Live events ===
- Debut 1st Anniversary Commemoration Event: Minorin Spring Celebration 2005 (April 10, 2005)
- Birthday Event: Minorin Birthday Celebration 2005 (November 20, 2005)
- Debut 2nd Anniversary Commemoration Event: Minorin Spring Celebration 2006 (April 22, 2006)
- Love Live 2006: Minori Chihara Birthday (November 18, 2006)
- I Melody: Minori Chihara Birthday Live 2007 (November 18, 2007)
- Starchild Presents: Starchild Collection
- Minori Chihara 1st Live Tour 2008: Contact/Re:Birth (March 9, March 16, March 22, March 23)
- Minori Chihara Live Tour 2009: Parade (February–March 2009)
- Minori Chihara Live at DaiCon (Malaysia) 「DaiCon-大コン-」 (July 11–12, 2009)
- Minori Chihara Live 2009 "Summer Camp" (August 1–2, 2009)
- Minori Chihara Final & Countdown Live 2009–2010 (December 31, 2009)
- Minori Chihara Live 2010 "Sing All Love" (April 10 – May 30, 2010)
- Minori Chihara Live 2010 "Summer Camp 2" (August 11–12, 2010)
- Minori Chihara Live 2010 "Invasion Tour" (October 9, 2010)
- Minori Chihara Xmas Party 2010 (December 25, 2010)
- Minori Chihara Film Live (February 9, 2011)
- Minori Chihara Live 2011 "Key for Defection" (May 2–8, 2011)
- Minori Chihara Live 2011 "Summer Camp 3" (August 5–7, 2011)
- Minori Chihara Final & Countdown Live 2011–2012 (December 31, 2011)
- Minori Chihara Acoustic Live "A-Formation" (February 29, 2012)
- Minori Chihara Live 2012 "D-Formation" (April 7 – May 27, 2012)
- Minori Chihara Ultra Formation/Party Formation (June 16–17, 2012)
- Minori Chihara Live 2012 "Summer Camp 4" (August 4–5, 2012)
- Minori Chihara Birthday Live (November 18, 2012)

=== Additional work ===
- Blister Pack V♀ices
- True Love: Winter Best Songs (Commercial narration)
- True Love: Spring Memorial Songs (Commercial narration)
- Natsu Monogatari: Summer Best Songs (Commercial narration)

== Discography ==
=== Studio albums ===
Title	Album details	Peak chart positions	
Title	Album details	JPN	JPN Hot (Note: The Billboard Japan Hot Albums was established in June 2015.)
Heroine	Released: December 22, 2004; Label: King Records; Formats: CD	—	—
Contact	Released: October 24, 2007; Label: Lantis; Formats: CD, digital download, streaming	11	—
Parade	Released: November 26, 2008; Label: Lantis; Formats: CD, digital download, streaming	16	—
Sing All Love	Released: February 17, 2010; Label: Lantis; Formats: CD, digital download, streaming	6	—
D-Formation	Released: February 29, 2012; Label: Lantis; Formats: CD, digital download, streaming	3	—
Neo Fantasia	Released: December 11, 2013; Label: Lantis; Formats: CD, digital download, streaming	10	—
Innocent Age	Released: April 6, 2016; Label: Lantis; Formats: CD, digital download, streaming	11	16
Spiral	Released: September 26, 2018; Label: Lantis; Formats: CD, digital download, streaming	22	24
"—" denotes releases that did not chart.

=== Compilation albums ===
Title	Album details	Peak chart positions		
Title	Album details	JPN	JPN Comb. (Note: The Oricon Combined Albums Chart was established in December 2018.)	JPN Hot
Minori Chihara B-side Collection	Released: March 13, 2013; Label: Lantis; Formats: CD, digital download, streaming	29	—	—
Sanctuary ~Minori Chihara Best Album~	Released: September 10, 2014; Label: Lantis; Formats: CD, digital download, streaming	9	—	—
Sanctuary II ~Minori Chihara Best Album~	Released: February 5, 2020; Label: Lantis; Formats: CD, digital download, streaming	16	18	26

=== Cover albums ===
Title	Album details	Peak chart positions
Title	Album details	JPN
Reincarnation	Released: March 23, 2015; Label: Lantis; Formats: CD, digital download, streaming	23
Minori with Strings Quartet ~弦楽四重奏の調べ~	Released: December 28, 2017; Label: Lantis; Formats: CD, digital download, streaming	—
"—" denotes releases that did not chart.

=== Extended plays ===
Title	Album details	Peak chart positions		
Title	Album details	JPN	JPN Comb.	JPN Hot
Re:Contact	Released: November 18, 2021; Label: Lantis; Formats: CD, digital download, streaming	26	43	28

=== Singles ===
Date released	Single name
January 13, 2005	Zutto...Issho/Makenai (Ichizu Version) (ずっと...一緒/負けない〜一途バージョン〜)
January 24, 2007	Junpaku Sanctuary (純白サンクチュアリィ)
June 6, 2007	Kimi ga Kureta Ano Hi (君がくれたあの日)
March 26, 2008	Melty Tale Storage
August 6, 2008	Ameagari no Hana yo Sake (雨上がりの花よ咲け)
November 5, 2008	Paradise Lost
June 3, 2009	Tomorrow's Chance
December 23, 2009	Precious One
February 24, 2010	Yasashii Bōkyaku (優しい忘却)
July 21, 2010	Freedom Dreamer
August 7, 2010	Ittōsei (一等星)
February 9, 2011	Defection
February 9, 2011	Key for Life
July 6, 2011	Planet Patrol
August 5, 2011	Minorin Ondo (みのりん音頭)
October 19, 2011	Terminated
March 21, 2012	Celestial Diva
July 11, 2012	Zone//Alone
August 11, 2012	Minorin☆Surfing (みのりん☆サーフィン)
October 24, 2012	Self Producer
April 24, 2013	Kono Sekai wa Bokura wo Matteita (この世界は僕らを待っていた)
October 30, 2013	Kyōkai no Kanata (境界の彼方)
February 26, 2014	Fool the World
July 23, 2014	Mukai Kaze ni Utarenagara (向かい風に打たれながら)
April 22, 2015	Aitakatta Sora (会いたかった空)
June 24, 2015	Arigatō, Daisuki (ありがとう、だいすき)
November 18, 2015	Koi (恋)
January 31, 2018	Michishirube (みちしるべ)
June 6, 2018	Remained dream / Hopeful "SOUL"
September 4, 2019	Amy (エイミー)
December 4, 2019	Christmas Night

=== Character singles ===
Date released	Title
September 29, 2004	Tenjho Tenge Great Disc. 1 (天上天下 Great Disc. 1)
January 25, 2006	Angel Addict
February 22, 2006	Smile Means Love
May 10, 2006	Hare Hare Yukai (ハレ晴レユカイ)
July 5, 2006	Nagato Yuki Character Song (Vol. 2 長門 有希)
November 1, 2006	LoveLoveLove no Sei na no yo! (LoveLoveLoveのせいなのよ!)
November 22, 2006	Saikyo Pare Parade (最強パレパレード)
December 6, 2006	Candy (Bitter&Sweet)
March 21, 2007	Seioh Gakuen Kōka Band (聖桜学園校歌バンド)
March 21, 2007	Only Lonely Rain
July 25, 2007	Fragment: Shooting star of the origin
September 26, 2007	Iwasaki Minami Character Song (Vol.006 岩崎みなみ)
October 24, 2007	Keikenchi Joshochu☆ (経験値上昇中☆)
October 31, 2007	Mune Pettan Girls Character Song (Vol.010 胸ぺったんガールズ)
November 21, 2007	Colorful Days (カラフルDays)
December 26, 2007	Lucky ☆ Star Re-Mix002
December 26, 2007	D.C. II: Da Capo II Vol.0
January 23, 2008	Kokoro no Tsubasa (ココロノツバサ)
January 23, 2008	Sekai ga Yume miru Yume No Naka/Saishuu Mirai o Misete! (世界が夢見るユメノナカ / 最終未来を見せて!)
February 6, 2008	Sono Koe ga Kiki Takute (その声が聞きたくて)
February 27, 2008	D.C. II: Da Capo II Character Song Vol. 3
April 23, 2008	Minami-ke Biyori (みなみけ びより)
January 23, 2009	『Suzumiya Haruhi no Gekidō』 Vocal Mini-album (『涼宮ハルヒの激動』ボーカルミニアルバム)

=== DVD ===
- Message 01, released December 26, 2007
- Minori Chihara 1st Live Tour 2008 Contact DVD, released June 25, 2008
- Message 02, released February 4, 2009
- Minori Chihara Live Tour 2009 Parade DVD, released June 24, 2009
- Message 03, released April 10, 2010
- Minori Chihara Live Tour 2010:Sing All Love DVD, released November 10, 2010
- Minori Chihara Summer Camp 2 DVD, released February 23, 2011
- Message 04, released April 4, 2012

=== Book ===
- Minorhythm, published March 30, 2006
- Minori Chihara Live Tour 2009 〜Parade〜 Live Photobook, published June 24, 2009
- Chihara Minori First photobook Crescendo, published October 23, 2009
- Minori Chihara Live Tour 2010 〜Sing All Love〜 Live Photobook, published October 27, 2010
- Memories, published September 6, 2011
- MINORI CHIHARA 10th ANNIVERSARY ARTIST BOOK LOVE LETTER, published November 18, 2014
- Minorin Collection published July 29, 2016
- Chihara Minori photobook minoreal published March 18, 2020

== See also ==
- List of J-pop artists
