= Paradise Lost (Minori Chihara song) =

Single by Minori Chihara
- Released: November 5, 2008 (Japan)
- Genre: Symphonic pop, classical
- Length: 19:45
- Label: Lantis

Minori Chihara singles chronology
"'Ameagari no Hana yo Sake'" (2008)	"Paradise Lost" (2008)	"'Tomorrow's chance'" (2009)

Paradise Lost is the fifth CD single by Minori Chihara. The single was used as the opening theme song to the anime Ga-rei -Zero- in which she voices the main character Kagura Tsuchimiya. Subsequently, in the 6th episode of The Melancholy of Haruhi Suzumiya-chan, the character Yuki Nagato (reprised by Minori Chihara herself) sang a muted version of Paradise Lost at the end of the episode. The single placed 15th on the Oricon charts in the month it debuted.

== Track listing ==
1. "Paradise Lost"
2. "Yūki no Kodō" (勇気の鼓動, lit. "Beat of Courage")
3. "Paradise Lost (off vocal)"
4. "Yūki no Kodō (off vocal)" (勇気の鼓動 (off vocal), lit. "Beat of Courage (off vocal)")
