= Kimi ga Kureta Ano Hi =

Single by Minori Chihara
- Released: June 6, 2007 (Japan)
- Genre: Symphonic rock
- Length: 19:31
- Label: Lantis

Minori Chihara singles chronology
"'Junpaku Sanctuary'" (2007)	"Kimi ga Kureta Ano Hi" (2007)	"'Melty tale storage'" (2008)

Kimi ga Kureta Ano Hi (君がくれたあの日; lit. "That Day You Gave") is the second CD single by Minori Chihara. The single placed 20th on the Oricon charts after its debut.

== Track listing ==
1. "Kimi ga Kureta Ano Hi" (君がくれたあの日; lit. "That Day You Gave")
2. "Last Arden"
3. "Kimi ga Kureta Ano Hi (off vocal)" (君がくれたあの日(off vocal); lit. "That Day You Gave (off vocal)")
4. "Last Arden (off vocal)"
