= Sing All Love =

Studio album by Minori Chihara
- Released: February 17, 2010
- Genre: Rock, electropop, anisong
- Label: Lantis

Minori Chihara chronology
Parade (2008)	Sing All Love (2010)	D-Formation (2012)

Sing All Love is the fourth full-length studio album by J-pop singer Minori Chihara. It was released on February 17, 2010.

== Track listing ==
No.	Title	Length
1.	"覚醒フィラメント"
2.	"Final Moratorium"
3.	"Tomorrow's chance"
4.	"書きかけのDestiny"
5.	"孤独の結晶"
6.	"Love Medicine*"
7.	"雨音のベール"
8.	"tea for two"
9.	"PRECIOUS ONE"
10.	"サクラピアス"
11.	"Falling heaven's now"
12.	"Flame"
13.	"Perfect energy"
14.	"sing for you"
