= Innocent Venus =

Japanese anime television series

- Opening title's logo from episode one

イノセント・ヴィーナス (Inosento Vīnasu)
- Genre: Adventure, drama, science fiction
- Created by: Innocent Project
- Anime television series
- Directed by: Jun Kawagoe; Assistant director: Tomoyuki Kawamura
- Produced by: Yoshihiko Fujisawa; Jūkō Ozawa; Yoshinaga Minami
- Written by: Shinsuke Ōnishi
- Music by: Tomohisa Ishikawa
- Studio: Brain's Base
- Licensed by: NA: ADV Films (expired)
- Original network: Wowow
- English network: UK: Propeller TV; US: Anime Network
- Original run: July 26, 2006 – October 25, 2006
- Episodes: 12

Innocent Venus (Japanese: イノセント・ヴィーナス, Hepburn: Inosento Vīnasu) is a Japanese anime television series which began broadcasting on the Wowow network in Japan on July 26, 2006, at midnight. The series makes use of some 3D cel-shaded animation, which achieves a more "hand drawn" look than traditional 3D animation. At Anime Boston 2007, ADV Films announced they licensed for the show (for $120,000). On July 11, 2008, ADV announced that it was discontinuing printing of the DVDs.

== Plot ==
In the near future, after the world population and economy is devastated by a series of simultaneous hypercanes, (Note: Which occurred in 2010, in the Innocent Venus timeline.) many different factions and fledgling nations appear. In Japan, an elite class called Logos (Note: Originally, Logos was the name given to the system of special recovery zones. Over time, it also came to refer to those fortunate enough to be permanent residents of these zones.) appears, controlling special zones in the country which have most of the wealth and resources. These special zones were created with the help of Power Assist Technology, (Note: In other words powered exoskeletons developed for both civil and military purposes.) which allowed Japan to recover from the consequences of the worldwide disaster (which included a combination of land subsidence and rising sea levels resulting in the permanent submerging of low-lying areas and a subsequent ice age in much of the Northern Hemisphere), albeit to a strictly limited degree. The Logos exercise control over the Revenus, (Note: The origin of this term for the underclass is less clear, though it may refer to the fact that the Revenus acts as a cheap source of labor and certain other resources for the Logos (in French, the word Revenus can mean "income", or alternatively "return on investment". It can also directly refer to a government's income, monetary or otherwise, from taxes and other levies. The most common meaning of the term in modern French is "finance' though this is clearly not the implication of the term as it is used here). See also the derived English word revenue.) (Note: Note that in some versions of the English subtitles, Revenus is misspelled as "Revinus".) a lower class who mostly live in devastated and often poverty stricken zones (urban or in close proximity) and areas (rural) known as Levinas (Note: Such routine law enforcement as exists in the Levinas (as opposed to riot control and suppression operations which are generally carried out by the JDF [or occasionally Phantom in the case of the latter]) is conducted by the Levinas Police, seemingly originally formed from the remnants of the old pre-disaster regional police forces. The police in the Levinas are overstretched and under resourced, a situation which is made worse by the fact they are disliked by the Revenus for being "dogs of the Logos", despite the fact that they are in much the same boat as the rest of the residents of the Levinas, albeit with a bit more certainty about where their next meal is coming from.) (e.g. Levinas Sector Six, Area 18) and who struggle from day to day to stay alive. The Revenus are generally restricted (Note: Except for a lucky few who have permits to work in the special zones, usually in low wage positions such as being servants for Logos families.) from entering the special zones, causing tension which creates a resistance movement which fights back against the Logos.

With the tagline "A Near Future Late-Shogunate Action Animation", the story draws analogies with 19th-century Japan at the end of the Tokugawa Shogunate period, just before the Boshin War. (Note: For example, the Director General (of the Logos, and therefore post-disaster Japan in general, with the exception of the breakaway Satsuma Territory), who nominally heads up what was originally an emergency government put in place during the aftermath of the disaster, can be said be a modern day Shogun. The fate of the pre-disaster Imperial Family is not made clear, though it's possible that they are kept in seclusion, much as the Emperor and his family was during the Tokugawa Shogunate.) (Note: Yet another example are the Logos zones, which can be said to equivalent in at least some respects to the Han (Domain) system of the Edo period.)

The story proper is mainly set in 2035 AD. Jō and Jin defect from Phantom, an elite Japanese military special operations group which is used to help control the Revenus. When they escape, they take a young girl named Sana with them. The series follows them as they work to avoid being caught by Phantom and the regular military forces (Note: Directly descended from the pre-disaster JSDF (right down to some of their older equipment, such as the Fuji AH-1S) but now formally known as the Japan Defense Forces. An alternate name is 'National Defense Forces'. They do not have the legal and political restrictions that the old Jieitai labored under, such as Article 9. This is partly because of the total collapse of the old political order including the constitution in the chaos following 2010 and partly due to an attempted full-scale invasion of Japan during the late 2020s by an alliance of hostile states calling itself the Asian Union, with the primary beachhead located at Kyushu. The JDF, using Heavy Warriors (effectively walking medium tanks) and main battle tanks supported by Light Warriors (soldiers in powered armor) and conventional infantry backed up in turn by other advanced technology such as high altitude aerostats, along with the intervention of Phantom and its Gladiator mechs at a pivotal point, were able to eventually decisively repel the invasion. (The air and sea power of the two sides having apparently mostly cancelled each other out by the closing stages of the campaign.)) (Note: Incidentally, it is implied in later episodes of the anime that some elements of the JDF, including naval units, had mutinied and joined Satsuma when it broke away from the rest of Japan around the late 2020s in the aftermath of the war with the Asian Union, once it had become clear how the Logos system had degenerated from what had been originally intended, i.e. as a basis for the preservation and ultimate recovery of Japan.) of the Logos. However, there are more to things than meet the eye.

== Episode list ==
The opening theme is "Noble Roar" by Yōsei Teikoku while the ending theme is "Brand New Reason" by Fleet.

No.	Title	Original release date
1	"Hell"; Transliteration: "Naraku" (Japanese: 奈落)	July 26, 2006
2	"Madness"; Transliteration: "Koyuki" (Japanese: 凶気)	August 2, 2006
3	"Pirates"; Transliteration: "Wakou" (Japanese: 倭寇)	August 9, 2006
4	"Invasion"; Transliteration: "Shuurai" (Japanese: 襲来)	August 16, 2006
5	"Duet"; Transliteration: "Rendan" (Japanese: 連弾)	August 23, 2006
6	"Rampage"; Transliteration: "Bousou" (Japanese: 暴走)	September 13, 2006
7	"Scheme"; Transliteration: "Sakubou" (Japanese: 策謀)	September 20, 2006
8	"Loss"; Transliteration: "Soushitsu" (Japanese: 喪失)	September 27, 2006
9	"Aid"; Transliteration: "Kyuusai" (Japanese: 救済)	October 4, 2006
10	"Determination"; Transliteration: "Ketsui" (Japanese: 決意)	October 11, 2006
11	"Venus"; Transliteration: "Bijin" (Japanese: 美神)	October 18, 2006
12	"The World"; Transliteration: "Sekai" (Japanese: 世界)	October 25, 2006

== Staff ==
- Director: Jun Kawagoe
- Series Composition: Shinsuke Ōnishi
- Original Character Design: Shō Kōya
- Character Design: Hideki Nagamachi
- Mechanical Design: Hiroshi Ogawa
- Art Design: Jirō Kōno, Minoru Yasuhara
- Art Director: Katsuhiro Haji
- Color Design: Kōchi Usui
- Cinematography Director: Megumi Saitō
- 3D Director: Yūichi Gotō
- Editor: Masaki Sakamoto
- Audio Director: Yoshikazu Iwanami
- Sound Effects: Yasumasa Koyama
- Sound Production: Half H•P Studio
- Music: Tomohisa Ishikawa
- Music Production: Lantis
- Animation Production: Brain's Base
- Produced by Bandai Visual

== General references ==
- Beveridge, Chris (August 16, 2007). "Innocent Venus Vol. #1". Mania. Demand Media. Archived from the original on December 6, 2008.
- Beveridge, Chris (October 19, 2007). "Innocent Venus Vol. #2 (also w/box)". Mania. Demand Media. Archived from the original on May 15, 2009.
- Beveridge, Chris (December 14, 2007). "Innocent Venus Vol. #3". Mania. Demand Media. Archived from the original on May 15, 2009.
- Foote, Aiden (February 10, 2012). "Innocent Venus". T.H.E.M. Anime Reviews.
- Gifford, Kevin (August 2007). "Innocent Venus". Newtype USA. Vol. 6, no. 8. A.D. Vision. p. 93. ISSN 1541-4817.
- Kimlinger, Carl (August 25, 2007). "Innocent Venus DVD 1". Anime News Network.
- Kimlinger, Carl (October 25, 2007). "Innocent Venus DVD 2". Anime News Network.
- Kimlinger, Carl (February 14, 2008). "Innocent Venus DVD 3". Anime News Network.
- Liversidge, Ross (November 13, 2007). "Anime Review: Innocent Venus Vol. 1". UK Anime Network.
- Liversidge, Ross (February 20, 2008). "Anime Review: Innocent Venus Vol. 2". UK Anime Network.
- Morton, Bryan (October 5, 2007). "Innocent Venus Vol. #1". Mania. Demand Media. Archived from the original on December 6, 2008.
- Morton, Bryan (December 11, 2007). "Innocent Venus Vol. #2". Mania. Demand Media. Archived from the original on December 6, 2008.
- Salandanan, Rommel (July 8, 2007). "Innocent Venus Vol. 1: Cruel World Order (Advance Review)". Active Anime.
- Salandanan, Rommel (November 13, 2007). "Innocent Venus Vol. 2: Blood of Betrayal". Active Anime.
- Yu, Michelle (January 13, 2008). "Innocent Venus V1 DVD 1". Anime News Network.
