= Weiß Flügel =

2008 single by Yōsei Teikoku

Single by Yōsei Teikoku

from the album Gothic Lolita Doctrine
- Released: 10 September 2008
- Recorded: 2008
- Genre: J-pop, gothic rock, gothic metal, dark ambient
- Length: 4:25
- Label: Lantis

Yōsei Teikoku singles chronology
"Hades: The Bloody Rage" (2008)	"Weiß Flügel" (2008)	"Gekkō no Chigiri (月光の契り)" (2009)

"Weiß Flügel" [sic: weiße Flügel] is Yousei Teikoku's 8th single. It was released on September 10, 2008. The title means "white wings" in German.

== Track listing ==
1. "Weiß Flügel" - 4:25
2. 機械少女幻想 (Kikai Shoujo Gensou; "Machine Girl's Fantasy") - 3:22
3. "Weiß Flügel" (Instrumental) - 4:25
4. 機械少女幻想 (Instrumental) - 3:19
