= List of Seven Mortal Sins episodes =

Seven Mortal Sins is a Japanese anime television series produced by Artland and TNK that aired from April 14 to July 29, 2017. The series ran for 12 episodes and had 19 ONAs. It is an adaptation of Hobby Japan's media franchise The 7 Deadly Sins (七つの大罪 Nanatsu no Taizai), which primarily consists of a series of fantasy figures. The opening theme "My Sweet Maiden" and ending theme "Welcome to our diabolic paradise" were both sung by Mia Regina.

The Seven Heavenly Virtues is a Japanese anime television series produced by Bridge that aired from January 26 to March 30, 2018. The series ran for 10 episodes and had 2 OVAs. It is an adaptation of Hobby Japan's media franchise The Seven Heavenly Virtues (七つの美徳 Nanatsu no Bitoku), which primarily consists of a series of fantasy figures. The opening theme is "Psychomachia" by Yousei Teikoku.

== Episode list ==
=== Seven Mortal Sins ===
No.	Title (Note: All English titles are taken from Crunchyroll.)	Original release date
1	"The Proud Fallen Angel"; Transliteration: "Gōmantaru daten-shi" (Japanese: 傲慢たる堕天使)	April 14, 2017
Freshly cast out of Heaven, the former angel Lucifer makes a brief stop in a high school church on Earth, where she encounters a girl named Maria Totsuka before continuing her fall to Hell. Once there, she is met and fawned over by Leviathan, an aspiring minor Demon Lord, and challenged to combat by Satan and Belial, two Demon Lords of the Seven Mortal Sins and members of the ruling council of Hell who accuse her of intending an invasion of their territory. Despite gaining the upper hand initially, Lucifer is eventually subdued by Belial and stripped of her angel powers and wings; but with this last link to Heaven gone, Lucifer transforms into a demon lord herself. Along with Leviathan, she returns to Earth and meets Maria again, whom she promptly stabs through the heart.
2	"Driven Wild by Envy"; Transliteration: "Shitto-yue no bōsō" (Japanese: 嫉妬ゆえの暴走)	April 21, 2017
Instead of killing her, Lucifer removes Maria's heart from her body, turning the hapless girl into her immortal thrall. Lucifer and her entourage move into the presidential suite at the Royal Towers Hotel. As they partake in the luxuries of their new quarters, Leviathan tries her best to gain her new mistress' favor, but grows increasingly jealous when Lucifer pays more attention to Maria instead of her. As a result, when Lucifer makes a short trip to take her mind off her defeat against Belial for a while, Leviathan begins to sexually torment the forlorn girl; but when Maria eventually admits that she has herself sometimes felt envious of her friend Mina because she had not found anyone to love in her life, and states that envy born of love is not a sin, she manages to stir doubts in Leviathan and break the demon's hold on her. After Maria has regained consciousness, Lucifer, by licking her breast, stimulates Maria's special gift of seeing into discerning the current location of one of the Mortal Sins. Upon hearing that one of them is in Miami, Lucifer calls for their immediate departure.
3	"Beach of Lust"; Transliteration: "Shikiyoku no Nagisa" (Japanese: 色欲の渚)	April 28, 2017
Arriving in Miami, Lucifer, Maria and Leviathan catch Asmodeus, the Demon Lord of Lust, openly seducing the local beach-goers in order to consign their souls to Hell and thereby increase her power base. With all the lust from the crowd bolstering her powers, the protagonists find themselves outmatched in open battle and are forced to retreat. A later attempt at a night club, where Asmodeus performs a pole dance, likewise fails when Leviathan, with her lust for Lucifer, easily falls prey to Asmodeus. However, since Maria has attracted Asmodeus' attention, Lucifer uses her as bait, and the girl's piety and innocence help her in withstanding Asmodeus' seductions long enough for Lucifer to track them down. Asmodeus ensnares Lucifer, but her own power is turned against her when Lucifer points out that lust is something completely natural, thus negating her status as a Mortal Sin and the link of the Garb of Punishment powered by Lust. Lucifer spares Asmodeus' life, who graciously accepts her defeat.
4	"The Town of Fog Where Greed Brews"; Transliteration: "Gōyoku ugomeku kiri no machi" (Japanese: 強欲うごめく霧の街)	May 5, 2017
Lucifer and her entourage track Mammon, Demon Lord of Greed, to London, where she runs a potion-selling business. Upon entering the shop, they are caught in a trap. Lucifer takes up Mammon's challenge to a personal duel, is beaten and subjected to sexual torture astride a wooden horse; but even after Leviathan manages to free herself from her cage and rushes to her aid, Lucifer decides to ride out the torment. Meanwhile, Mammon returns to her shop and attempts to seduce Maria, who was left behind by Leviathan, into selling her soul and acting as a nursemaid for her 500,000 children. But Maria resists by pointing out that the children need their mother, not a substitute; and with her pride finally overcoming her agony, Lucifer breaks free and defeats Mammon, destroying her shop and freeing all the prisoners she has ensnared, as well as breaking another link of her Garb of Punishment.
4.5	"This Is Indeed the Work of Demons..."; Transliteration: "Masani Akuma no Shogyō" (Japanese: まさに悪魔の所業・・・)	May 12, 2017
Recap of episodes 1-4.
5	"The Languid Diva"; Transliteration: "Yūutsuna Utahime" (Japanese: 憂鬱なる歌姫)	May 19, 2017
Lucifer next confronts and challenges Astaroth, the Demon Lord of Melancholy, who is making a living as an internet rock singer. Compelled by Maria's suggestion, Lucifer establishes herself as a singing idol in order to out-achieve Astaroth, which develops into a hard popularity contest once Astaroth receives Belial's and Belphegor's backing. Finally, Astaroth ascends into the professional music world, but as her popularity grows, so does her insecurity. At the final showdown during her first live performance, Astaroth ends up sharing the stage with Lucifer and losing, but although she remains loyal to Belial, the parting of the adversaries ends up quite amicably. And as a reward for her efforts and dedication, Lucifer grants Maria the boon of addressing her more informally.
6	"Sloth Online"; Transliteration: "Taida Onrain" (Japanese: 怠惰オンライン)	May 26, 2017
While she attempts to contemplate a strategy on how to confront her next adversary, Belphegor, Lucifer is drawn into a virtual world created by the Demon Lord of Sloth inside the Internet, where Belphegor challenges her in a multiplayer online game for world conquest. When Lucifer proves too tough for her and her followers to handle, Belphegor traps Maria inside her virtual game world as well and tricks her into becoming her lingerie-armored champion. After some laborious training and receiving a special set of armor, Maria - who has in the meantime realized the truth - manages to defeat Lucifer, but refuses to finish her off. This allows Lucifer to recover and use her magic to destroy the fabric of Belphegor's virtual world, and with her power diminished by the desertion of her followers as they unlink themselves from the game to pursue matters in the real world, Belphegor is plunged into defeat.
7	"Guiltless Gluttony"; Transliteration: "Toga naki bōshoku" (Japanese: 咎なき暴食)	June 2, 2017
During an erotic dinner party hosted by Beelzebub, Lucifer pops up and challenges the Demon Lord of Gluttony to an eating contest. In the midst of it, however, Lucifer ends up being hospitalized with a stomach flu, and sees herself confronted by the worry and care of her companions Maria and Leviathan (something she is not used to at all), and Belial posing as her treating physician. To her surprise, Lucifer eventually finds herself sharing a room with Beelzebub, who is a regular patient in the hospital for gastric dilation. As the two begin to become friends, Beelzebub admits that she likes to eat not because eating is supposed to be a sin, but because it is supposed to bring joy and happiness to the people. After being discharged, they share a friendly meal together, and Beelzebub willingly forgoes her status as a Mortal Sin. However, just then Maria is kidnapped by Belial, who has discovered the emotional bond Lucifer shares with the girl.
8	"Unleashed Wrath"; Transliteration: "Tokihanatare ta fundo" (Japanese: 解き放たれた憤怒)	June 9, 2017
Belial seeks out Satan, the Demon Lord of Wrath, and tells her that Lucifer has managed to subjugate Beelzebub (conveniently neglecting to mention that Beelzebub did so willingly), inciting Satan to seek out the fallen angel and punish her for this supposed transgression. Leviathan engages her in battle to defend Lucifer, but with the city currently gripped by wrath and thus fueling Satan's power, she is easily defeated. Encouraged by Beelzebub and her fondness of Maria, who is now imprisoned in the palace of the Seven Sins, Lucifer faces Satan and her fleet of conscripted Navy warships. When she is pushed to the verge of defeat, Beelzebub brings Leviathan back from unconsciousness, and the tide of battle is quickly turned. After relocating to the surface on the Moon, Satan confidentially unseals her portion of Lucifer's Garb of Punishment, returning a portion of her powers, and faces off against her opponent in single combat. Despite the Demon Lord's vast level in power, Lucifer manages to beat Satan, who admits defeat and willingly agrees to open the gates of Hell so that Lucifer can carry the final fight to Belial herself.
9	"Ye Abandon All Hope"; Transliteration: "Nanji, issai no kibō o suteyo" (Japanese: 汝、一切の希望を捨てよ)	June 16, 2017
For her failure to subdue Lucifer, Belial imprisons and torments Satan, forcing her to guard the gates to Hell against Lucifer's impending intrusion. But prior to her invasion, Lucifer has utilized her new abilities as a demon lord to draw power from the lingering pride in every human's soul, thus gaining entry. As Lucifer and Leviathan make their way down to the lower levels of Hell, Belial attempts to rally the other Mortal Sins, but except for Astaroth they all refuse to follow her any longer. After struggling with a lewd Charon, Lucifer and Leviathan reach the Palace of Minos, where they are met by the other Seven Sins. It is then that Lucifer reveals why she was cast from Heaven: God had issued an order to the Seven Heavenly Virtues to purge both Hell and Earth, even though the corruption of humanity - and thus the existence of Hell - is part of an inevitable course which cannot be broken even by God's power; and Lucifer was banished when she protested against the perpetual repetition of this measure throughout the millennia. It is also revealed that Belial knew about this, and has struck a deal with Michael to have Lucifer delivered to her for eternal damnation in exchange for the release of all souls trapped in Hell and getting exempted from the purge. Astaroth, refusing to believe that Belial would betray them all, attempts to attack but is held off by Leviathan, while Lucifer continues her journey down to Cocytus.
10	"Love Your Enemies and Pray for Those Who Persecute You"; Transliteration: "Nanji no teki o aishi, nanjira o seme sha no tame ni inore" (Japanese: 汝の敵を愛し、汝らを責むる者のために祈れ)	June 23, 2017
While Lucifer, accompanied by Behemoth, makes her way down the circles of Hell, Belial confronts the rogue Seven Sins and subjects them to punishments befitting their respective natures for defying her. When Lucifer encounters her allies and wishes to aid them, most of them agree that they must ride out their torment as a final purge of their former ties with Belial and as acceptance of their new allegiance with Lucifer. However, by the time Lucifer reaches the palace of the Seven Sins, she is nearly drained of power, leaving her helpless before Belial.
10.5	"Emergency Special! Guilt of Curfew"; Transliteration: "Kinkyū tokuban! Mongen yaburi no tsumi" (Japanese: 緊急特番！門限破りの罪)	June 30, 2017
A special clip episode highlighting some of the lewder scenes in the series.
11	"Ask, and It Shall Be Given to You"; Transliteration: "Motomeyo, saraba atae raren" (Japanese: 求めよ、さらば与えられん)	July 7, 2017
When Lucifer regains consciousness, she finds herself restrained and tortured by Belial, who reveals that she found Lucifer's angel blood in Maria and plans to use it to return to Heaven, as she was once an angel herself but banished by Lucifer in God's name after she had inadvertently caused the humans she meant to gather as God's followers to fall prey to sin. Now, with the deal she has made with Michael and Lucifer's blood in her possession, she intends to usher in a new age in which God's glory shall reach unforeknown heights and she will thus be reinstated as an angel. But with her renouncement of her role as the ruler of the Seven Sins, the tortures she has inflicted upon the others are cancelled out; the five rogue Sins free Lucifer but are imprisoned themselves when Belial wields Lucifer's power she has absorbed against them. Belial then torments Maria into stabbing Lucifer through the heart; but by willingly sacrificing herself, Lucifer manages to swap her heart with Maria's, restoring them both. In the subsequent duel, Belial is easily defeated, but then Michael arrives in Cocytus and enters the Palace of the Seven Sins.
12	"God's in His Heaven, All's Right With the World"; Transliteration: "Kami wa ten ni imashi, subete yo wa koto mo nashi" (Japanese: 神は天にいまし、すべて世は事も無し)	July 29, 2017
As Belial begins to gather new hope, Michael coldly crushes her by stating that she never intended to honor their contract in the first place, and sets out to destroy Hell. Joined by the infuriated Belial, the Seven Sins take up the fight against the archangel and shatter the power God has granted Michael for the task, enabling Lucifer to engage her on equal grounds on Earth. Michael succeeds in fatally stabbing Lucifer with the Lance of Longinus, but with her love for Lucifer, Maria willingly sacrifices her life to bring her back from the verge of annihilation. Now uniting the powers of Heaven, Hell and Earth within herself in a new trinity, Lucifer defeats Michael but spares her, sending her back to Heaven, and manages to bring Maria back from death. While Belial and Astaroth begin a new life together on Earth, Lucifer and Leviathan take their place as the Lords of Mortal Sins in Hell, in preparation for Lucifer's final onslaught against Heaven to liberate humanity from God's arbitrariness.
ONA–1	"Confession #1: I, Who Am Easily Riled Up"; Transliteration: "Kokuhaku# 1: Kantan ni makiage rareru watashi" (Japanese: 告白＃1：簡単に巻き上げられる私)	April 14, 2017
Leviathan convinces Lucifer to practice action poses. Lucifer beats her up when she notices Leviathan is recording her.
ONA–2	"Confession #2: I, Who Am Honest About My Hobby"; Transliteration: "Kokuhaku# 2: Watashi no shumi ni shōjikina watashi" (Japanese: 告白＃2：私の趣味に正直な私)	April 21, 2017
Leviathan steals Lucifer's panties while she is showering, but Lucifer catches her and beats her up.
ONA–3	"Confession #3: I, Who Am Kind"; Transliteration: "Kokuhaku# 3: Watashi, shinsetsuna hito" (Japanese: 告白＃3：私、親切な人)	April 28, 2017
Asmodeus attempts to seduce Maria by cosplaying as a playboy bunny and then a dominatrix, but fails. She succeeds as a nurse and gives Maria a massage while preparing to use a vibrator on her.
ONA–4	"Confession #4: I, Who Am Strict With Quality"; Transliteration: "Kokuhaku# 4: Hinshitsu ni kibishī watashi" (Japanese: 告白＃4：品質に厳しい私)	May 5, 2017
Mammon sells photos of herself and the other Sins in states of undress. Eager for more profits, she makes figurines of them, only to realize the cost of making them is too great, leaving her in debt.
ONA–5	"Confession #5: I, Who Am Busy With Work"; Transliteration: "Kokuhaku# 5: Shigoto de isogashī watashi" (Japanese: 告白＃5：仕事で忙しい私)	May 19, 2017
Astaroth participates in a cosplay photo shoot and becomes increasingly uncomfortable, especially since many of the photographers are perverts. She asks Belial and Belphegor for help, only to find they are photographers too.
ONA–6	"Confession #6: I, Who Am Frugal"; Transliteration: "Kokuhaku# 6: Watashi, shissona hito" (Japanese: 告白＃6：私、質素な人)	May 26, 2017
Astaroth is running low on money. Belial tells her to just go naked to save on laundry and attract more fans. She attempts to do a performance naked, but becomes too embarrassed.
ONA–7	"Confession #7: I, Who Takes Care Of Cute Things"; Transliteration: "Kokuhaku# 7: Kawaī mono no sewa o suru watashi" (Japanese: 告白＃7：かわいいものの世話をする私)	June 2, 2017
Satan takes in some stray kittens. They claw up her cape and she becomes angry, but forgives them because they are so cute.
ONA–8	"Confession #8: I, Who Am Active"; Transliteration: "Kokuhaku# 8: Watashi, akutibuna hito" (Japanese: 告白＃8：私、アクティブな人)	June 9, 2017
This episode explores how hard Belphegor works to be lazy. She orders liquor on the Internet, but loses patience and goes to the store to buy it directly. She fishes for and cooks a cherry snapper, then after eating and drinking, sleeps under the cherry blossom trees. When she wakes up, she orders sake on the Internet.
ONA–9	"Confession #9: I, Who Am Stupid"; Transliteration: "Kokuhaku# 9: Watashi, orokamono" (Japanese: 告白＃9：私、愚か者)	June 16, 2017
Lucifer and Belial are sunbathing in Hell and decide to race to a mandrake root, but they slip on the ice. They decide to wrestle instead and rip each other's swimsuits off. Belphegor records them and says the footage will attract many followers.
ONA–10	"Confession #10: I, Who Will Make You Happy"; Transliteration: "Kokuhaku# 10: Watashi, anata o shiawaseni suru hito" (Japanese: 告白＃10：私、あなたを幸せにする人)	June 23, 2017
Lucifer and Satan serve Beelzebub meat and she enjoys it in her thoughts, but her face remains stoic. Satan amazes Lucifer by being able to tell what she is thinking.
ONA–11	"Confession #11: I, Who Am Playing"; Transliteration: "Kokuhaku# 11: Watashi, asonde iru hito" (Japanese: 告白＃11：私、遊んでいる人)	July 7, 2017
Mammon and Belial play Twister and Mammon wins. Mammon plays against Belphegor, but Belphegor uses her tail to reach a spot, which Mammon complains is cheating.
ONA–12	"Confession #12: I, Who Am XXXing"; Transliteration: "Kokuhaku# 12: Watashi, XXXing" (Japanese: 告白＃12：私、XXXing)	July 29, 2017
The Sins and Maria all relax in a hot spring. Belphegor gets drunk and Lucifer wins a leg wrestling match with Satan.
ONA–13	"Confession Specials #1: I, Who Does Not Like To Lose"; Transliteration: "Kokuhaku supesharu# 1: Maketakunai watashi" (Japanese: 告白スペシャル＃1：負けたくない私)	June 28, 2017
Lucifer and Belial play Tug of war with the rope attached to tape fixed to their genitals. Leviathan and Astaroth cheer them on, but Belphegor, who wasn't paying attention, throws away an empty sake bottle. The bottle lands on the rope hard enough to rip the tape off, making the two scream in pain.
ONA–14	"Confession Specials #2: I, Whose Panties Are Amazing"; Transliteration: "Kokuhaku supesharu# 2: Pantī ga sugoi watashi" (Japanese: 告白スペシャル＃2：パンティーがすごい私)	July 28, 2017
Leviathan buys a pack of bandages, then in the restroom, she painfully replaces the bandage over her groin.
ONA–15	"Confession Specials #3: I, Who Am A Saint"; Transliteration: "Kokuhaku supesharu# 3: Seijindearu watashi" (Japanese: 告白スペシャル＃3：聖人である私)	August 23, 2017
On Christmas Eve, Satan dresses as Santa Claus to make children happy. She tries to go down a chimney, but gets stuck. She struggles, but accidentally rips her clothes and falls to the bottom naked.
ONA–16	"Confession Specials #4: I, Who Does Not Clean Up"; Transliteration: "Kokuhaku supesharu# 4: Katadzuke o shinai watashi" (Japanese: 告白スペシャル＃4：片付けをしない私)	September 28, 2017
Astaroth visits Belphegor and berates her for her extremely messy room. When she spots an erotic video game, Belphegor suddenly seduces her and they start having sex. This is revealed to just be Astaroth's daydream. Embarrassed, she tries to leave, but bumps into a pile of junk and gets buried under it.
ONA–17	"Confession Specials #5: I, Who Am Eager To Work"; Transliteration: "Kokuhaku supesharu# 5: Hatarakita gatte iru watashi" (Japanese: 告白スペシャル＃5：働きたがっている私)	October 25, 2017
In either a fantasy or virtual world, Mammon seduces an adventurer who finds that touching her breasts increased his strength, so he thanks her with gold. She opens a booth charging people for access to her breasts.
ONA–18	"Confession Specials #6: I, Who Am Worrying"; Transliteration: "Kokuhaku supesharu# 6: Shinpai shite iru watashi" (Japanese: 告白スペシャル＃6：心配している私)	November 29, 2017
Beelzebub, Belial, Mammon, and Asmodeus relax in the hot spring, but Beelzebub is jealous of the others for their large breasts. The others combine their powers to enhance her bust size, cheering her up, but her new breasts turn out to be fake when they fall off.
ONA–19	"Confession Specials #7: I, Who Am A Devil"; Transliteration: "Kokuhaku supesharu# 7: Watashi wa akumadesu" (Japanese: 告白スペシャル＃7：私は悪魔です)	December 20, 2017
Asmodeus captures Maria and tries to make her submit by feeding her an aphrodisiac, but the now lust-maddened Maria overpowers her and ties her up. Maria tortures her with a vibrator and says she is now Asmodeus' master, which Asmodeus enjoys.

=== The Seven Heavenly Virtues ===
No.	Title (Note: All English titles are taken from Hidive.)	Original release date
1	"The Angels Descend"; Transliteration: "Tenshi, kōfuku" (Japanese: 天使、降伏)	January 26, 2018
Michael (Faith) finds a random human across the street and picks him as her personal candidate to be the Messiah. Shortly afterwards, she moves in with her candidate and starts training him like a soldier to fight the demons. As harsh and strict Michael is, her candidate manages to get into her good graces by cooking her favorite meal, omelettes.
2	"I'm Supporting You from the Shadows"; Transliteration: "Kage to natte ōen shite imasu" (Japanese: 影となって応援しています)	February 2, 2018
Uriel (Patience) chooses an office worker as her Messiah candidate and begins stalking him throughout his daily routine, which begins disrupting his ability to do his work and eventually gets him fired. As the candidate attempts to find a new job, Uriel, having concluded that she has fallen in love with him, moves in with him.
3	"Special Dessert Training"; Transliteration: "Suītsu no tokkunda ne" (Japanese: スイーツの特訓だね)	February 9, 2018
Raphael (Temperance) becomes acquainted to a young man selling pastries in a street. After eating some of his cupcakes, Raphael excitedly begins helping him bake and sell more pastries, which ultimately become a success. Hearing of the human's dream of becoming a master pastry chief, Raphael realizes that being a Messiah will prevent him from following his dream, so she refrains from recruiting him and erases his memories of her.
4	"Please Focus"; Transliteration: "Shūchū shite kudasai" (Japanese: 集中してください)	February 16, 2018
Sandalphon (Diligence) chooses a student as her candidate and helps him study for an exam using her inventions and asking advice from Belphegor. Despite Sandalphon's machines and her own physical attractiveness giving him trouble to focus on his studies, the candidate ultimately, albeit barely, passes his exam.
5	"Is This... Alright?"; Transliteration: "Kore de... Ī ndesu kā" (Japanese: これで…いいんですかぁ)	February 23, 2018
Metatron (Charity) works as a nurse at a hospital to treat her candidate but realizes that she doesn't know anything about being a nurse, so she resorts to simply using her body to clean him up and make him feel better. While the candidate is initially glad to be serviced by her, she quickly turns into a sexual sadist upon touching a needle, which ultimately makes him worse.
6	"No! That's Immoral!"; Transliteration: "Damedayo! Jida yo!" (Japanese: ダメだよ！じだよ！)	March 2, 2018
Gabriel (Chastity) is lecturing a crowd against engaging in sexual activities when she spots her candidate. She immediately moves in with him and tries to clean up all of his immoralities - ranging from stealing his porn to dictating what foods and clothes he can have. On his day off, the candidate takes Gabriel to the amusement park, where she finally reveals her true angelic form and invites him to a "wholesome relationship" with her.
7	"Good Job at Work Today!"; Transliteration: "Oshigoto, otsukaresama" (Japanese: お仕事、お疲れ様)	March 9, 2018
Sariel (Kindness) is waiting for her Messiah candidate when he returns home from work and helps him cope with the stresses of his job. He is happy when she allows him to touch her breasts and butt. Michael and Uriel detect she is about to sneeze and rush over, but are too late; her sneeze blows up his apartment.
8	"Be Careful on Crowded Trains"; Transliteration: "Man'in densha ni go chūi" (Japanese: 満員電車にご注意)	March 16, 2018
Michael, Sariel, Raphael and Gabriel observe the human world by riding the train with their candidates. Despite Michael's distaste in how the humans around her behave, she agrees to keep looking out for them when her candidate gives up his seat for an elderly woman.
9	"Training Together?!"; Transliteration: "Issho ni kunren!?" (Japanese: いっしょに訓練！？)	March 23, 2018
Michael and the other Heavenly Virtues participate in a fitness training video to motivate their candidates.
10	"The Angels' Room"; Transliteration: "Tenshi no heya" (Japanese: 天使の部屋)	March 30, 2018
Michael, Uriel, Gabriel and Sandalphon brag about their respective Messiah candidates to each other while changing in the locker room. After initially lying to her comrades, Michael confesses that her main reason for sticking with her candidate has been the delicious omelettes he makes her. Michael then joins the Virtues in returning to Heaven, saying they will try again in another city.
OVA–1	"The Messiah's Virtues"; Transliteration: "Meshia no bitoku" (Japanese: メシアの美徳)	April 27, 2018
Sandalphon and Metatron test a candidate by strapping Uriel to a table and having mechanical arms strip and molest her to see his reactions. He fails the test by becoming aroused and is dropped through a trap door. Sandalphon and Metatron wonder if they will ever find the Messiah while Uriel is humiliated by her experience.
OVA–2	"Splash! A New Training Method"; Transliteration: "Supurasshu! Aratana Dokkkun" (Japanese: スプラッシュ! 新たな特訓)	April 27, 2018
Michael orders the other Virtues to train with her in the park by fighting with water guns improve their aim and dodging ability, using a device invented by Sandalphon to make them invisible to onlookers. When they don't take the training seriously and just playfully spray each other, Michael enchants the water to dissolve clothing to motivate them. By the end, they are all rendered naked, then the device breaks, exposing them to the crowd and humiliating them.
