= Mobile Suit Gundam: The Witch from Mercury (soundtrack) =

Mobile Suit Gundam: The Witch from Mercury Original Soundtrack

Soundtrack album by Takashi Ohmama
- Released: July 26, 2023
- Recorded: 2022
- Studios: Sound City (Tokyo); Studio 23 (Budapest); Vienna Synchron Stage (Vienna); Mini Blue Studio (Vienna); Onkio Haus (Tokyo); Mastertracks Studio (Rome)
- Genres: Film score; J-pop; electropop; dance-pop; alternative rock
- Length: 3:39:46
- Language: Japanese
- Label: Sunrise Music Label
- Producer: Takashi Ohmama

Singles from Mobile Suit Gundam: The Witch from Mercury Original Soundtrack
- 1. "Shukufuku" Released: October 1, 2022; 2. "Kimi yo Kedakaku Are" Released: November 9, 2022; 3. "Red:Birthmark" Released: April 10, 2023; 4. "Slash" Released: May 10, 2023

Alternative cover
- LP-sized Limited Edition cover

Mobile Suit Gundam: The Witch from Mercury Original Soundtrack (機動戦士ガンダム 水星の魔女 Original Soundtrack, Kidō Senshi Gandamu Suisei no Majo Original Soundtrack) is the soundtrack album to the anime TV series of the same name, released by Sunrise Music Label on July 26, 2023. It features the series' orchestral score by Takashi Ohmama, plus TV-size versions of the opening and ending themes. The album was released in three editions: a regular edition four-CD version, a limited edition four-CD version with LP-sized packaging, and a two-disc LP version.

The album peaked at No. 15 on Oricon's weekly albums chart and No. 7 on Billboard Japan's Hot Albums chart.

== Track listing ==
Standard four-CD release

All music is composed by Takashi Ohmama, except where indicated.

Disc 1: Prologue
No.	Title	Length
1.	"Layer 33"	1:26
2.	"Eri"	1:21
3.	"The Mobile Suit Development Council"	1:58
4.	"Delling Rembran"	1:41
5.	"Lfrith Is the Future"	1:54
6.	"Crossing the Line"	3:02
7.	"Weapons Should Only Exist to Kill People"	4:08
8.	"The Stolen Future"	1:24
9.	"Happy Birthday to You"	3:41
Total length:		20:38

Disc 2: Season 1-1
No.	Title	Lyrics	Music	Artist	Length
1.	"Shukufuku (祝福; "The Blessing")" (TV Size)	Ayase	Ayase	Yoasobi	1:32
2.	"Cockpit"				2:10
3.	"Asticassia"				3:37
4.	"Earth House"				3:04
5.	"Pain in the Neck"				1:28
6.	"Whispering"				1:51
7.	"Jeturk House"				1:54
8.	"Miorine"				2:17
9.	"Clumsily but Also Steadily"				1:59
10.	"Elan Ceres"				2:19
11.	"The Dueling Committee"				1:45
12.	"Suletta"				1:45
13.	"Not Going Well"				2:36
14.	"Tell Me More About You"				1:52
15.	"Boo-hoo"				1:42
16.	"Delling's Plan"				2:19
17.	"Emergency Council"				2:09
18.	"Get Ready for the Duel"				2:19
19.	"Fix Release"				3:51
20.	"The Witch from Mercury"				4:59
21.	"Interrogation"				2:36
22.	"Behind the Scenes"				2:05
23.	"Prospera"				2:28
24.	"Will You Marry Me?"				2:17
Total length:					57:05

Disc 3: Season 1-2
No.	Title	Lyrics	Music	Artist	Length
1.	"Greenhouse"				1:59
2.	"Tsundere"				1:55
3.	"You Are My Crew"				3:03
4.	"Standing Up"				4:02
5.	"Shin Sei Development Corporation"				1:48
6.	"Their Plots"				2:49
7.	"Distance"				2:00
8.	"My Depression"				2:11
9.	"Gundam Pharact"				3:09
10.	"Distant Memory"				2:02
11.	"The President of the Benerit Group"				2:24
12.	"Make Up Your Mind"				3:00
13.	"The Way I Wanna Go"				2:26
14.	"Prospera's Plan"				2:24
15.	"Foundation of Gund-Arm Inc."				2:57
16.	"Build Up"				3:45
17.	"Simulation Exercise"				2:01
18.	"Difficult Situation"				2:47
19.	"The Curse of Gundam"				2:18
20.	"Gloomy Day"				2:08
21.	"Asticassia" (Reprise)				3:02
22.	"Time Alone with You"				2:56
23.	"Terrorism"				3:01
24.	"Enemy Onslaught"				2:27
25.	"Aerial Rebuild"				5:06
26.	"Kimi yo Kedakaku Are (君よ 気高くあれ; "You Be Noble")" (TV Size)	Ryo	Ryo	Shiyui	1:36
27.	"Gund-Arm Inc." (Karaoke Ver.)				0:36
Total length:					70:02

Disc 4: Season 2
No.	Title	Lyrics	Music	Artist	Length
1.	"Slash" (Anime Ver.)	Ryuki Baba	Baba; Naoki Endo	Yama	1:33
2.	"The Purpose of Shaddiq"				2:07
3.	"Open Campus"				2:03
4.	"Conflict in Mind"				2:23
5.	"An Isolated Mind"				2:01
6.	"Probing Each Other"				2:27
7.	"The Witches from Earth"				3:15
8.	"The Quiet Zero Project"				3:03
9.	"The Dawn of Fold"				2:36
10.	"Father and Child"				3:06
11.	"Heartbreak"				2:06
12.	"Back and Forth"				3:31
13.	"Desperation"				2:38
14.	"The Programming"				2:22
15.	"The Inevitable Parting"				2:17
16.	"Who Are You?"				2:31
17.	"The Calm Before the Storm"				2:43
18.	"Unsafe Negotiations"				2:46
19.	"Wish"				2:32
20.	"Chaos"				5:15
21.	"Quiet Zero"				3:22
22.	"Liberation from the Curse"				5:20
23.	"Farewell to the Gundam"				4:37
24.	"The Way We Wanna Go"				3:37
25.	"Red:Birthmark" (TV Size)	TK	TK	Aina the End	1:21
Total length:					71:48

Analog Edition LP

Side A: Prologue
No.	Title	Length
1.	"Layer 33"	1:26
2.	"Eri"	1:21
3.	"Lfrith Is the Future"	1:54
4.	"Weapons Should Only Exist to Kill People"	4:08
5.	"The Stolen Future"	1:24
6.	"Happy Birthday to You"	3:41

Side B: Season 1-1
No.	Title	Length
1.	"Cockpit"	2:10
2.	"Asticassia"	3:37
3.	"Fix Release"	3:51
4.	"The Witch from Mercury"	4:59

Side C: Season 1-2
No.	Title	Length
1.	"Get Ready for the Duel"	2:19
2.	"Gundam Pharact"	3:09
3.	"Make Up Your Mind"	3:00
4.	"Aerial Rebuild"	5:06

Side D: Season 2
No.	Title	Length
1.	"Heartbreak"	2:06
2.	"Quiet Zero"	3:22
3.	"Liberation from the Curse"	5:20
4.	"The Way We Wanna Go"	3:37

== Personnel ==
Tokyo session

- Koichiro Muroya Strings – strings

- Koichiro Muroya – violin
- Rina Odera – violin
- Teruka Murata – violin
- Momoko Takeda – violin
- Eriko Ukemura – violin
- Nagisa Kiriyama – violin
- Yuichi Endo – violin
- Nao Tohara – violin
- Tetsuo Tsushima – violin
- Hideki Imaoka – violin
- Nagisa Sasaki – violin
- Akane Irie – violin
- Ryoko Matsui – violin
- Mari Asai – violin
- Emiko Ujikawa – violin
- Shoko Mabuchi – viola
- Tomoko Shimaoka – viola
- Kintaro Hagiya – viola
- Kiyo Kido – viola
- Taiki Suzumura – viola
- Masami Horisawa – cello
- Takahiro Yuki – cello
- Yuki Mizuno – cello
- Mao Tomonoh – cello
- Yu Miyao – cello
- Jun Satoh – contrabass
- Koji Arake – contrabass
- Shigeki Ippon – contrabass
- Hirofumi Taniuchi – contrabass
Budapest session

- Peter Pejtsik – conductor
- Budapest Art Orchestra – woodwinds, string quartet

Vienna session

- Gottfried Rabl – conductor
- Synchron Stage Orchestra – brass, strings

Rome session

- Clara Sorace – vocals (disc 2 track 20, disc 3 track 25, disc 4 tracks 21/22/24)

== Charts ==
Chart (2023)	Peak position
Oricon Japanese Albums	15
Billboard Japan Hot Albums	7
Billboard Japan Top Download Albums	11
Billboard Japan Top Album Sales	8
