= Pax Vesania =

Studio album by Yousei Teikoku
- Released: March 26, 2013
- Recorded: 2011–2013
- Genre: Symphonic metal; hard rock; dark wave
- Length: 53:22
- Language: Japanese
- Label: Lantis
- Producer: Team Fairithm

Yousei Teikoku studio album chronology
Gothic Lolita Agitator (2010)	Pax Vesania (2013)	Hades: The Other World (2014)

Singles from Pax Vesania
- 1. "Kuusou Mesorogiwi" Released: October 26, 2011

Pax Vesania is the eighth studio album by Japanese rock band Yousei Teikoku, released on March 26, 2013, by Lantis.

The song "Kuusou Mesorogiwi" was used as the opening theme for the first 14 episodes of the Future Diary anime, and "The Creator" was used as the main theme for the pilot of the anime. "Kyouki Chinden" was the opening theme for the Future Diary: Redial OVA.

== Track listing ==
Pax Vesania track listing
No.	Title	Lyrics	Music	Length
1.	"Jo" (序)	Yui		1:04
2.	"Astral Dogma"	Yui	Takaha Tachibana	5:27
3.	"Solitude"	Yui	Shiren	4:10
4.	"Kyouki Chinden" (狂気沈殿)	Yui	Takaha Tachibana	4:08
5.	"Kokoro Sanctuary" (ココロサンクチュアリ)	Yui	Nanami	4:22
6.	"Tsuki Kagami Hangon Cinerarium" (月鏡反魂シネラリウム)	Yui	Nanami	3:45
7.	"Siege oder sterben"	Yui	Takaha Tachibana	3:39
8.	"missing"	Yui	Shiren	5:17
9.	"The Creator"	Yui	Takaha Tachibana	3:49
10.	"Herrscher"	Yui	Takaha Tachibana	5:10
11.	"Kuusou Mesorogiwi" (空想メソロギヰ)	Yui	Takaha Tachibana	4:03
12.	"Sou Uta" (葬詩)	Yui	Nanami	4:43
13.	"Kikai" (機械)	Kenji Ohtsuki	Toshiaki Honjo, King Show	3:45
Total length:				53:22

== Personnel ==
- Yui Itsuki – vocals
- Takaha Tachibana – guitar
- Nanami – bass
- Shiren – lead guitar

== Charts ==
Chart performance for Pax Vesania
Chart (2013)	Peak position
Japanese Albums (Oricon)	37
