= Bandai Visual =

Japanese anime and distribution label of Bandai Namco Filmworks

Bandai Visual/Emotion
- Native name: バンダイビジュアル/エモーション
- Romanized name: Bandai Bijuaru/Emōshon
- Formerly: Bandai Entertainment Group/Bandai Home Video (1983-2002)
- Type: Label
- Industry: Anime; Home entertainment
- Founded: August 23, 1983; 43 years ago
- Headquarters: Ogikubo, Suginami, Tokyo, Japan
- Owner: Bandai (1983-1992); Bandai Visual Co., Ltd. (1992-2015); Bandai Namco Arts (2015-2022); Bandai Namco Filmworks (2022-present)
- Website: v-storage.jp

Bandai Visual (Note: Japanese: バンダイビジュアル, Hepburn: Bandai Bijuaru) was a Japanese film production and distribution label, owned by Bandai Namco Filmworks. The company originally focused mainly in international distribution of anime properties in North America. defunct April 1 2018

Most of the anime and films that have been distributed and licensed by Bandai Visual have been released under the Emotion (Note: Japanese: エモーション, Hepburn: Emōshon; stylized in all caps) label. After the reorganization of Bandai Namco Holdings in 2006, Bandai Visual headed the group's Visual and Music Content Strategic Business Unit. Its subsidiaries included the Emotion Music Company, Ltd. (whose logos also include the Moai from Easter Island), and Lantis music publishing labels. Until 2012, it was involved in the production and distribution of several anime titles, including those it has directly produced itself and anime series produced by the anime studio Sunrise, an alternate anime studio subsidiary of Bandai Namco Holdings. In September 2017, Bandai Visual acquired the anime studio Actas.

In February 2018, it was announced Bandai Visual would be merged with Lantis into a new branch of BNH, called Bandai Namco Arts. The reorganizing took effect as of April 1, 2018. Bandai Visual remains only as a label of the new company.

== History ==
=== Origins and expansion (1983–1996) ===
On August 23, 1983, Japanese toy manufacturer Bandai established AE Planning Co., Ltd. (Account Executive Planning), an animation and film distributor, in Kōjimachi, Chiyoda. Bandai created AE Planning following the success of Emotion, its film distribution division, in 1982, and was part of Bandai's corporate reorganization and alteration of its business strategies. AE Planning primarily distributed original video animations (OVAs) from other companies, most notably Pierrot's Dallos (1983). Beginning in October 1984, it licensed and distributed laserdisc films in Japan. After Bandai agreed to a business alliance with The Walt Disney Company in 1987, AE Planning became a distributor of Disney animated films across the country.

In March 1989, AE Planning renamed itself Bandai Visual Sales and opened a second office in Shōwa-ku, Nagoya. Alongside its publishing and distribution of VHS releases for television series such as Ultraman and Mobile Suit Gundam, Visual Sales operated the Emotion Theater movie theater in Bandai's B-Club Shop in Takadanobaba until its closure in 1997. Bandai Visual Sales was renamed again to Bandai Visual Co., Ltd. in August 1991. In the same year, it absorbed Bandai's Media Division as a means to unify the latter company's home video distribution businesses. The acquisition also gave Bandai Visual ownership of the Emotion label, which was used for its music, anime re-releases, and other products. As the company continued generating profits, it began expanding its operations into other entertainment industries. In 1996, Bandai Visual began publishing video games under the Emotion Digital Software brand, releasing titles such as Return to Zork, MechWarrior 2: Arcade Combat Edition and Choujikuu Yousai Macross: Ai Oboete Imasu ka.

=== Mainstream success and Bandai Entertainment (1996–2005) ===
In April 1996, Bandai Visual published Mobile Suit Gundam Wing, the sixth mainline installment in the Gundam media franchise. Hugely popular in Japan, Gundam Wing saw that popularity re-emerge in the United States, being credited for single-handedly popularizing the Gundam franchise for Western audiences. Following the show's success, Bandai established a subsidiary named Bandai Entertainment Inc. in Cypress, California as a subsidiary of its United States division, Bandai America. Though Bandai Visual did not have any direct control over Bandai Entertainment, the latter company often licensed many of Visual's anime series for publishing and distribution in North America, such as Cowboy Bebop, The Melancholy of Haruhi Suzumiya, and multiple Gundam sequels. Bandai Entertainment also published English-translated manga series and American graphic novels, in addition to offering a "fan support" program to facilitate public screenings of licensed content at anime clubs and anime conventions.

Bandai Visual was listed on JASDAQ market in November 2001; by that time, the company was worth over ¥2.1 billion (US$20 million). In January 2003, the company acquired Emotion Music and made it a wholly owned subsidiary, as a means to further expand into the music industry. Bandai Visual also began supplying content for broadband distribution networks, such as the Bandai Channel television station.

=== Namco Bandai takeover and merge with Lantis (2005–2018) ===
Bandai Visual was a wholly owned subsidiary of Namco Bandai Holdings. Namco Bandai announced on November 8, 2007, that it would buy the voting shares it did not own between that date and December 10, 2007, and turn the company into a wholly owned subsidiary. On December 18, 2007, Namco Bandai announced that it had owned 93.63% of Bandai Visual's shares since the end of November. The remaining shares were delisted from the Tokyo Stock Exchange on February 15, 2008, after Namco Bandai acquired the remaining 10% of the shares.

In February 2018, it was announced Bandai Visual would be merged with Lantis into a new branch of BNH, called Bandai Namco Arts. The reorganizing took effect as of April 1, 2018. Bandai Visual remains only as a label of the new company.

=== Later history as a label and retirement (2018–2022) ===
In time for the 40th anniversary of the Emotion brand in 2022, BNF retired the Bandai Visual name for good, with all releases now being under Emotion, starting in 2023.

== Subsidiaries ==
=== Bandai Visual USA / Bandai Entertainment ===
Bandai Visual USA was established in 2005 in Cypress, California to license anime properties from various Japanese companies for North American distribution; most of those licenses coming from Bandai and its sister company Sunrise. The company also licensed manga series for release with English translation, and published American-made graphic novels. Bandai Visual USA's releases were of high quality and were aimed at collectors. Their titles were released under the Honnêamise label (named after their Bandai Visual's first production, Royal Space Force: The Wings of Honnêamise). Bandai Visual USA's anime products were distributed in North America initially by Image Entertainment and later, Geneon Entertainment USA and in Europe by Beez Entertainment. On May 23, 2008, Bandai Namco Holdings announced that Bandai Visual USA would be merged into the newly formed Bandai Entertainment which was consummated on July 1, 2008.

The company confirmed on January 2, 2012, that they would stop offering new DVD, Blu-ray disc and manga releases by February, but would continue to produce their current library of content. Bandai Entertainment was restructured to focus on licensing anime to other companies. On August 30, 2012, Bandai America announced that it will shut down Bandai Entertainment and discontinue distributing their home video and print catalog on March 1, 2013. They made their final shipment to retailers on November 30, 2012. Many former Bandai Entertainment titles have been re-licensed by other companies, including Funimation, Crunchyroll, Aniplex of America, Discotek Media, Media Blasters, Nozomi Entertainment, Viz Media, Maiden Japan and Sentai Filmworks.

Most of the notable titles that Bandai Entertainment held included K-On!, The Melancholy of Haruhi Suzumiya and Lucky Star.

Bandai Namco would eventually re-establish its North American presence in February 2025 with the founding Bandai Namco Filmworks America to handle the company's licensing and brand management activities internationally. The announcement coincided with the start of the co-financing and co-production of the Gundam film with Legendary Pictures.

=== Beez Entertainment ===
Beez Entertainment was the European branch of Bandai Entertainment that also distributed anime and music and were also owned by Bandai Namco Holdings. The name is an acronym for Bandai Entertainment European Zone. Following the discontinuation of Bandai Entertainment, Beez has also stopped releasing anime in the European market. Their anime releases were licensed in North America by Bandai Entertainment and Bandai Visual USA.

=== Honnêamise ===
Honnêamise was Bandai Visual USA's boutique label that distributed deluxe editions of anime and artsier products. The label's namesake comes from Royal Space Force: The Wings of Honnêamise. The label was shut down on July 1, 2008, when Bandai Visual USA was absorbed into Bandai Entertainment. The label's releases were distributed by Geneon Entertainment USA and Image Entertainment.

== Music ==
In August 2009, Bandai Visual had their first music release on US iTunes with Lantis Sounds. In September 2009, Bandai Visual teamed up with Namco Bandai Games for their periodic release of game sounds (classic and new) to iTunes USA.
