= List of Aikatsu! albums =

This is a list of albums attributed to the Japanese anime and arcade series Aikatsu!.

== Theme song singles ==
=== Signalize! / Calendar Girl ===
"Signalize! / Calendar Girl"

Single by Star☆Anis
- Released: November 21, 2012
- Label: Lantis

"Signalize! / Calendar Girl" is the theme song single of TV series Aikatsu!. It is released on November 21, 2012. The singers are Waka, Fūri, Sunao, and Risuko from Star☆Anis. The theme songs are used during episode 1-25 of the first season.

==== Track listing ====
1. "Signalize!"
  - Lyrics: Aki Hata
  - Composition: Narasaki
  - Arrangement: Sadesper Record
2. "Calendar Girl" (カレンダーガール)
  - Lyrics: Saori Kodama
  - Composition/Arrangement: Hidekazu Tanaka (Monaca)
3. "Signalize!" (Off Vocal)
4. "Calendar Girl" (カレンダーガール) (Off Vocal)

=== Diamond Happy / Hirari/Hitori/Kirari ===
"Diamond Happy / Kirari"

Single by Star☆Anis
- Released: June 26, 2013
- Label: Lantis

"Diamond Happy / Kirari" is the single for the anime's theme songs that were featured in the second half first season. This single contains four tracks with singers including Waka, Fūri, Sunao, Remi, Moe, Eri, Yuna, and Risuko from Star☆Anis and released on June 26, 2013, along with the mini album "Fourth Party!". The single also has ranked 19 on Oricon's weekly chart.

==== Track listing ====
1. "Diamond Happy" (ダイヤモンドハッピー)
  - Lyrics: Aki Hata
  - Composition/Arrangement: Kakeru Ishihama (Monaca)
2. "Hirari/Hitori/Kirari" (ヒラリ/ヒトリ/キラリ)
  - Lyrics: Natsumi Tadano
  - Composition/Arrangement: Keiko Hoashi (Monaca)
3. "Diamond Happy" (ダイヤモンドハッピー) (Off Vocal)
4. "Hirari/Hitori/Kirari" (ヒラリ/ヒトリ/キラリ) (Off Vocal)

=== Kira☆Power / Original Star☆彡 ===
"Kira☆Power / Original Star☆彡"

Single by Star☆Anis
- Released: October 23, 2013
- Label: Lantis

"Kira☆Power / Original Star☆彡" is the theme song single for the second season of TV series Aikatsu!. The single contains four tracks with singers including Waka, Fūri, Sunao, Risuko, Remi, Moe, Eri and Yuna from STAR☆ANIS. It is released on October 23, 2013, a launching event also has been held on October 27, 2013, at Tōkyō LaQua. The CD also achieved 10th ranking on Oricon's weekly chart.

==== Track listing ====
1. "Kira☆Power"
  - Lyrics: Aki Hata
  - Composition/Arrangement: Kakeru Ishihama (Monaca)
2. "Original Star☆彡" (オリジナルスター☆彡)
  - Lyrics: Saori Kodama
  - Composition/Arrangement: Hidekazu Tanaka (Monaca)
3. "Kira☆Power" (Off Vocal)
4. "Original Star☆彡" (オリジナルスター☆彡) (Off Vocal)

=== Shining Line* / Precious ===
"Shining Line* / Precious"

Single by Star☆Anis
- Released: April 30, 2014
- Label: Lantis

"Shining Line* / Precious"is the new theme song single for the second season of TV series Aikatsu!. The single contains four tracks with singers including Waka, Fūri, Risuko, Yuna and Mona from STAR☆ANIS. It was released on April 30, 2014.

==== Track listing ====
1. "Shining Line*"
  - Lyrics: Saori Kodama
  - Composition/Arrangement: Kakeru Ishihama (Monaca)
2. "Precious"
  - Lyrics: Junsara Tsuji
  - Composition/Arrangement: Keigo Hoashi (Monaca)
3. "Shining Line*" (Off Vocal)
4. "Precious" (Off Vocal)

=== Du-Du-Wa Do It!! / Good morning my dream ===
"Du-Du-Wa Do It!! / Good morning my dream"

Single by AIKATSU☆STARS! and STAR☆ANIS
- Released: October 22, 2014
- Label: Lantis

"Du-Du-Wa Do It!! / Good morning my dream" is the new theme song single for the third season of TV series Aikatsu!. The single contains six tracks with singers including Waka from STAR☆ANIS and Ruka, Mona and Miki from AIKATSU☆STARS!. It is set to be released on October 22, 2014.

==== Track listing ====
1. "Du-Du-Wa Do It!!"
  - Lyrics: Saori Codama
  - Composition/Arrangement: Kengo Minamida
2. "Good morning my dream"
  - Lyrics: Saori Codama
  - Composition/Arrangement: Hidekazu Tanaka (Monaca)
3. "Let's Aikatsu!" (Let's アイカツ!)
  - Lyrics: Junko Tsuji
  - Composition/Arrangement: Hidekazu Tanaka (Monaca)
4. "Du-Du-Wa Do It!!" (Off Vocal)
5. "Good morning my dream" (Off Vocal)
6. "Let's Aikatsu!" (Let's アイカツ!) (Off Vocal)

=== Lovely Party Collection / Tutu Ballerina ===
"Lovely Party Collection / Tutu Ballerina"

Single by Aikatsu☆Stars!
- Released: April 29, 2015
- Label: Lantis

"Lovely Party Collection / Tutu Ballerina" is the new theme song single for the third season of TV series Aikatsu!. The single contains four tracks with singers including Ruka, Mona and Miki from AIKATSU☆STARS!. It is set to be released on April 29, 2015.

==== Track listing ====
1. "Lovely Party Collection"
  - Lyrics: Saori Codama
  - Composition/Arrangement: Kakeru Ishihama (Monaca)
2. "Tutu Ballerina" (チュチュ・バレリーナ)
  - Lyrics: Natsumi Tadano
  - Composition/Arrangement: Masaaki Ishihara/Yusuke Naruse
3. "Lovely Party Collection" (Off Vocal)
4. "Tutu Ballerina" (チュチュ・バレリーナ) (Off Vocal)

=== Start Dash Sensation / lucky train! ===
"Start Dash Sensation / lucky train!"

Single by Aikatsu☆Stars!
- Released: October 28, 2015
- Label: Lantis

"Start Dash Sensation / lucky train!" is the new theme song single for the fourth season of TV series Aikatsu!. The single contains four tracks with singers including Ruka, Mona and Miki from AIKATSU☆STARS!. It is set to be released on October 28, 2015.

==== Track listing ====
1. "Start Dash Sensation"
  - Lyrics: Saori Codama
  - Composition/Arrangement: Kakeru Ishihama (Monaca)
2. "lucky train!"
  - Lyrics: Natsumi Tadano
  - Composition: Ryota Nakano [中野領太]
  - Arrangement: Integral Clover (agehasprings)
3. "Start Dash Sensation" (Off Vocal)
4. "lucky train!" (Off Vocal)

== Concept/Insert song singles ==
=== First Live! ===
"First Live!"

Single by Star☆Anis
- Released: December 26, 2012
- Label: Lantis

"First Live!" is the first single from audition songs released on December 26, 2012. The singers are Waka, Fūri, Sunao, Risuko, and Remi from Star☆Anis.

==== Track listing ====
1. "Idol Activity!" (アイドル活動！)
  - Lyrics: uRy
  - Composition/Arrangement: Hidekazu Tanaka (Monaca)
2. "Move on Now!"
  - Lyrics: Saori Kodama
  - Composition/Arrangement: Hidekazu Tanaka (Monaca)
3. "Angel Snow"
  - Lyrics: Saori Kodama
  - Composition/Arrangement: Hidekazu Tanaka (Monaca)
4. "Idol Activity!" (アイドル活動！) (Off Vocal)
5. "Move on Now!" (Off Vocal)
6. "Angel Snow" (Off Vocal)

=== Second Show! ===
"Second Show!"

Single by Star☆Anis
- Released: January 31, 2013
- Label: Lantis

"Second Show!" is the second single from audition songs released on January 31, 2013. The singers are Waka, Fūri, and Sunao from Star☆Anis.

==== Track listing ====
1. "Growing for a dream"
  - Lyrics: Yoshifumi Kochi
  - Composition: Hiroshi Imai
  - Arrangement: Masazumi Ozawa
2. "prism spiral"
  - Lyrics: uRy
  - Composition/Arrangement: Hidekazu Tanaka (Monaca)
3. "Trap of Love"
  - Lyrics: Nana （Make Flow, Inc.）
  - Composition: Kenichi Mori
  - Arrangement: Masazumi Ozawa
4. "Growing for a dream" (Off Vocal)
5. "prism spiral" (Off Vocal)
6. "Trap of Love" (Off Vocal)

=== Third Action! ===
"Third Action!"

Single by Star☆Anis
- Released: February 27, 2013
- Label: Lantis

"Third Action!" is the third single from audition songs released on February 27, 2013. The singers are Sunao, Risuko, and Moe from Star☆Anis.

==== Track listing ====
1. "Midnight Skyhigh" (真夜中のスカイハイ)
  - Lyrics: uRy
  - Composition/Arrangement: Hidekazu Tanaka (Monaca)
2. "Thrilling Dream"
  - Lyrics: Saori Kodama
  - Composition/Arrangement: Kakeru Ishihama (Monaca)
3. "Glass Doll" (硝子ドール)
  - Lyrics: Saori Kodama
  - Composition/Arrangement: Keiko Hoashi (Monaca)
4. "Midnight Skyhigh" (真夜中のスカイハイ) (Off Vocal)
5. "Thrilling Dream" (Off Vocal)
6. "Glass Doll" (硝子ドール) (Off Vocal)

=== Hi・Ka・Ri Shining♪ ===
"Hi・Ka・Ri Shining♪"

Single by Yuniko Morishita and STAR☆ANIS
- Released: December 14, 2013
- Label: Sunrise Music Division

"Hi・Ka・Ri Shining♪" is Hikari Minowa's debut CD prior to her debut as an official supporter of Aikatsu! Official Shop. The single contains 9 tracks with singers including Yuniko and Sunao from STAR☆ANIS. The CD was released on December 14, 2013.

==== Track listing ====
1. "Idol Activity!" Hikari ver. (アイドル活動！ ヒカリver)【ShortSize】
  - Lyrics: uRy
  - Composition/Arrangement: Hidekazu Tanaka (Monaca)
2. "Kira☆Power" Hikari ver. (Kira☆Power ヒカリver)【ShortSize】
  - Lyrics: Aki Hata
  - Composition/Arrangement: Kakeru Ishihama (Monaca)
3. "Trap of Love" Hikari ver. (Trap of Love ヒカリver)【ShortSize】
  - Lyrics: Nana （Make Flow, Inc.）
  - Composition: Kenichi Mori
  - Arrangement: Masazumi Ozawa
4. "Calendar Girl" Hikari ver. (カレンダーガール ヒカリver)【ShortSize】
  - Lyrics: Saori Kodama
  - Composition/Arrangement: Hidekazu Tanaka (Monaca)
5. "Idol Activity!" Hikari&Ran ver. (アイドル活動！ ヒカリ&蘭ver.) 【ShortSize】
6. "Idol Activity!" (アイドル活動！) Off Vocal 【ShortSize】
7. "Kira☆Power" Off Vocal 【ShortSize】
8. "Trap of Love" Off Vocal 【ShortSize】
9. "Calendar Girl" (カレンダーガール) OFF VOCAL 【ShortSize】

=== Cool Mode ===
"Cool Mode"

Single by Star☆Anis
- Released: December 21, 2013
- Label: Lantis

"Cool Mode" is the second CD release of the 2014 Series. The single contains 6 tracks with singers including Waka, Fūri, Sunao and Yuna from STAR☆ANIS. The single was released on December 21, 2013.

==== Track listing ====
1. "Idol Activity! (Ver. Rock)" (アイドル活動！ (Ver. Rock))
  - Lyrics: uRy
  - Composition/Arrangement: Hidekazu Tanaka (Monaca)
2. "New・Chocolate Case" (新・チョコレート事件)
  - Lyrics: Aki Hata
  - Composition/Arrangement: Hidekazu Tanaka (Monaca)
3. "We wish you a merry Christmas Aikatsu Ver."
  - Lyrics: Saori Kodama
  - Composition/Arrangement: Kei'ichi Okabe (Monaca)
4. "Idol Activity! (Ver. Rock)" (アイドル活動！ (Ver. Rock)) (Off Vocal)
5. "New・Chocolate Case" (新・チョコレート事件) (Off Vocal)
6. "We wish you a merry Christmas Aikatsu Ver." (Off Vocal)

=== Sexy Style ===
"Sexy Style"

Single by Star☆Anis
- Released: February 26, 2014
- Label: Lantis

"Sexy Style" is the third CD release of the 2014 Series. The single contains 6 tracks with singers including Waka, Sunao, Remi and Yuna from STAR☆ANIS. The single will be released on February 26, 2014.

==== Track listing ====
1. "Kira・pata・shining"
  - Lyrics: Natsumi Tadano
  - Composition/Arrangement: PandaBoy
2. "Magical Time" (マジカルタイム)
  - Lyrics: Saori Kodama
  - Composition/Arrangement: Kuniyuki Takahashi (Monaca)
3. "Dance in the rain"
  - Lyrics: uRy
  - Composition/Arrangement: Hidekazu Tanaka (Monaca)

=== Beautiful Song ===
"Beautiful Song"

Single by Aikatsu☆Stars!
- Released: February 25, 2015
- Label: Lantis

TV Anime/Data Carddass "Aikatsu!" 3rd Season Insert Song - Beautiful Song (TVアニメ/データカードダス『アイカツ!』3rdシーズン 挿入歌 Beautiful Song) is the first CD release of the 2015 Series. The single contains 6 tracks with singers including Ruka, Mona, Miki and Miho from AIKATSU☆STARS!. The single will be released on February 25, 2015.

==== Track listing ====
1. "Tarte Tatin" (タルト・タタン)
  - Lyrics: Natsumi Tadano
  - Composition/Arrangement: NARASAKI
2. "Passion flower"
  - Lyrics: Hitomi Otsuka
  - Composition/Arrangement: Ryota Nakano/Kouichiro Takahashi
3. "Hello! Winter Love♪" (はろー! Winter Love♪)
  - Lyrics: SINBYI
  - Composition/Arrangement: Kazuhiro Higure/Kengo Minamida
4. "Tarte Tatin" (タルト・タタン) (off vocal)
5. "Passion flower" (off vocal)
6. "Hello! Winter Love♪" (はろー! Winter Love♪) (off vocal)

== Albums ==
=== Fourth Party! ===
Fourth Party!

EP by Star☆Anis, Risa, Eimi
- Released: June 26, 2013
- Label: Lantis

Star☆Anis, Risa, Eimi chronology
Fourth Party!	Calendar Girls

TV Anime "Aikatsu!" Insert Song Mini Album - Fourth Party! (TVアニメ『アイカツ!』挿入歌ミニアルバム Fourth Party!) is the first mini album of the series Aikatsu!. This album contains 8 tracks performed by Waka, Fūri, Sunao, Remi, Moe, Eri, Yuna, and Risuko from Star☆Anis, Risa, and Eimi and released on June 26, 2013, along with "Diamond Happy / Hirari/Hitori/Kirari" Single.

==== Track listing ====
1. "fashion check!"
  - Lyrics: uRy
  - Composition/Arrangement: Kakeru Ishihama (Monaca)
2. "Take Me Higher"
  - Lyrics: Natsumi Tadano
  - Composition/Arrangement: Takao Nagatani
3. "Ponytail After School" (放課後ポニーテール)
  - Lyrics: Saori Kodama
  - Composition/Arrangement: Hidekazu Tanaka (Monaca)
4. "Shining Sky on The G String" (G線上のShining Sky)
  - Lyrics: uRy
  - Composition/Arrangement: Keigo Hoashi (Monaca)
5. "Clockwise Wonderland" (右回りWonderland)
  - Lyrics: Saori Kodama
  - Composition/Arrangement: Ryuichi Takada (Monaca)
6. "Happiness on the same Earth" (同じ地球のしあわせに)
  - Lyrics: Saori Kodama
  - Composition/Arrangement: Ryuichi Takada (MONACA)
7. "Wake up my music"
  - Lyrics: Saori Kodama
  - Composition/Arrangement: Kei'ichi Okabe (Monaca)
8. "Moonlight destiny"
  - Lyrics: Saori Kodama
  - Composition/Arrangement: Keigo Hoashi (Monaca)

=== Calendar Girls ===
Calendar Girls

Greatest hits album by Star☆Anis, Rey and Eimi
- Released: April 9, 2014
- Label: Lantis

Star☆Anis, Rey and Eimi chronology
Fourth Party!	Calendar Girls	Pop Assort

TV Anime/Data Carddass "Aikatsu!" Best Album - Calendar Girls (TVアニメ/データカードダス『アイカツ！』ベストアルバム Calendar Girls) is the first best album of the Aikatsu! series, the album released on April 9, 2014, and will contain the songs that are yet to be contained on the released CDs. The album also reached 2nd position on Oricon's daily chart on its release day.

==== Track listing ====
▼ disc - 1

1. "Signalize!"
  - Lyrics: Aki Hata
  - Composition: Narasaki
  - Arrangement: Sadesper Record
2. "Move on Now!" ~Mizuki Solo Ver.~ (Move on now! ～美月ソロ Ver.～)
  - Lyrics: Saori Kodama
  - Composition/Arrangement: Hidekazu Tanaka (Monaca)
3. "Idol Activity!" (アイドル活動！)
  - Lyrics: uRy
  - Composition/Arrangement: Hidekazu Tanaka (Monaca)
4. "Growing for a dream"
  - Lyrics: Yoshifumi Kochi
  - Composition: Hiroshi Imai
  - Arrangement: Masazumi Ozawa
5. "prism spiral"
  - Lyrics: uRy
  - Composition/Arrangement: Hidekazu Tanaka (Monaca)
6. "Trap of Love" ~Ran Solo Ver.~ (Trap of Love ～蘭ソロ Ver.～)
  - Lyrics: Nana （Make Flow, Inc.）
  - Composition: Kenichi Mori
  - Arrangement: Masazumi Ozawa
7. "Ponytail After School" (放課後ポニーテール)
  - Lyrics: Saori Kodama
  - Composition/Arrangement: Hidekazu Tanaka (Monaca)
8. "Happiness on the same Earth" (同じ地球のしあわせに)
  - Lyrics: Saori Kodama
  - Composition/Arrangement: Ryuichi Takada (Monaca)
9. "Glass Doll" ~Yurika Solo Ver.~ (硝子ドール ～ユリカソロ Ver.～)
  - Lyrics: Saori Kodama
  - Composition/Arrangement: Keigo Hoashi (Monaca)
10. "Take Me Higher"
  - Lyrics: Natsumi Tadano
  - Composition/Arrangement: Takao Nagatani
11. "Hirari/Hitori/Kirari" (ヒラリ/ヒトリ/キラリ)
  - Lyrics: Natsumi Tadano
  - Composition/Arrangement: Keigo Hoashi (Monaca)
12. Kiss of the Alice Blue (アリスブルーのキス, Arisu Burū no Kisu)
  - Lyrics: Kenta Harada
  - Composition: Takayuki Sakamoto
  - Arrangement: Rey

▼ disc - 2

1. "Diamond Happy" (ダイヤモンドハッピー)
  - Lyrics: Aki Hata
  - Composition/Arrangement: Kakeru Ishihama (Monaca)
2. "Midnight Skyhigh" (真夜中のスカイハイ)
  - Lyrics: uRy
  - Composition/Arrangement: Hidekazu Tanaka (Monaca)
3. "Thrilling Dream"
  - Lyrics: Saori Kodama
  - Composition/Arrangement: Kakeru Ishihama (Monaca)
4. "Shining Sky on The G String" (G線上のShining Sky)
  - Lyrics: uRy
  - Composition/Arrangement: Keigo Hoashi (Monaca)
5. "Clockwise Wonderland" (右回りWonderland)
  - Lyrics: Saori Kodama
  - Composition/Arrangement: Ryuichi Takada (Monaca)
6. "Angel Snow"
  - Lyrics: Saori Kodama
  - Composition/Arrangement: Hidekazu Tanaka (Monaca)
7. "fashion check!"
  - Lyrics: uRy
  - Composition/Arrangement: Kakeru Ishihama (Monaca)
8. "Wake up my music" ~Ichigo & Ringo Ver.~ (Wake up my music ～いちご&りんご Ver.～)
  - Lyrics: Saori Kodama
  - Composition/Arrangement: Kei'ichi Okabe (Monaca)
9. "Moonlight destiny"
  - Lyrics: Saori Kodama
  - Composition/Arrangement: Keigo Hoashi (Monaca)
10. "Idol Activity!" ~Ichigo Solo Ver.~ (アイドル活動！ ～いちごソロ Ver.～)
  - Lyrics: uRy
  - Composition/Arrangement: Hidekazu Tanaka (Monaca)
11. "Calendar Girl" (カレンダーガール)
  - Lyrics: Saori Kodama
  - Composition/Arrangement: Hidekazu Tanaka (Monaca)

=== Pop Assort ===
Pop Assort

EP by Star☆Anis
- Released: June 25, 2014
- Label: Lantis

Star☆Anis chronology
Calendar Girls	Pop Assort	Cute Look

TV Anime "Aikatsu!" Insert Song Mini Album 【1】- Pop Assort (TVアニメ『アイカツ!』挿入歌ミニアルバム 【1】Pop Assort) is the second mini album of the series Aikatsu!. This album contains 8 tracks performed by Waka, Fūri, Remi, Eri, Risuko, Mona, and Ruka from Star☆Anis, and released on June 25, 2014. This is the first CD release to have songs performed by new Star☆Anis members Ruka and Mona.

==== Track listing ====
1. "Smiling Suncatcher" (笑顔のSuncatcher, Egao no Sankyatchā)
  - Lyrics: Natsumi Tadano
  - Composition/Arrangement: Takao Nagatani
2. "CHU-CHU♥RAINBOW"
  - Lyrics: Saori Kodama
  - Composition/Arrangement: Kei'ichi Hirokawa (Monaca)
3. "Sweet Sp!ce"
  - Lyrics: Tsuji Junsara
  - Composition/Arrangement: oriori
4. "Everlasting Lamplight" (永遠の灯, Eien no Tomoshibi)
  - Lyrics: tom.m
  - Composition: Kengo Minamida
  - Arrangement: Integral Clover
5. "Aurora Princess" (オーロラプリンセス)
  - Lyrics: Aki Hata
  - Composition/Arrangement: Keigo Hoashi (Monaca)
6. "The Only Fascinating Treasure!" (ミトレジャーノ！, Mitore Ja-no!)
  - Lyrics: Natsumi Tadano
  - Composition/Arrangement: Keigo Hoashi (Monaca)
7. "Idol Activities! ~Ichigo&Akari Ver.~" (アイドル活動！ ～いちご&あかり Ver.～, Aidoru Katsudō! ~Ichigo&Akari Ver.~)
  - Lyrics: uRy
  - Composition/Arrangement: Hidekazu Tanaka (Monaca)
8. "Sparkling Days" (キラキラデイズ, Kirakira Deizu)
  - Lyrics: Ayako Nakanomori, Kikomaru
  - Composition: Ayako Nakanomori
  - Arrangement: Ayako Nakanomori, uuiuui (Foster Sound)

=== Cute Look ===
Cute Look

EP by Star☆Anis
- Released: September 24, 2014
- Label: Lantis

Star☆Anis chronology
Pop Assort	Cute Look	Shining Star

TV Anime "Aikatsu!" Insert Song Mini Album 【2】- Cute Look (TVアニメ『アイカツ!』挿入歌ミニアルバム 【2】Cute Look) is the third mini album of the series Aikatsu!. This album contains 8 tracks performed by Waka, Fūri, Remi, Eri, Yuna, Risuko, and Mona from Star☆Anis, and released on September 24, 2014.

==== Track listing ====
1. "Happy Crescendo" (ハッピィクレッシェンド)
  - Lyrics: Tsuji Junsara
  - Composition/Arrangement: Sho Ishihama (Monaca)
2. "Adult Mode" (オトナモード, Otona Mōdo)
  - Lyrics: Natsumi Hayashi
  - Composition/Arrangement: Yuusuke Naruse
3. "stranger alien"
  - Lyrics: Natsumi Tadano
  - Composition/Arrangement: Keiichi Okabe (Monaca)
4. "Arabian Romance" (アラビアンロマンス)
  - Lyrics: Saori Kodama
  - Composition/Arrangement: Takao Nagatani
5. "Melody of the Heart" (ハートのメロディー, Hāto no Merodī)
  - Lyrics: Reika Kanda
  - Composition/Arrangement: Shogo Onishi
6. "Dancing☆Baby" (ダンシング☆ベイビー)
  - Lyrics: Natsumi Watanabe
  - Composition/Arrangement: Masashi Hamauzu
7. "Friend" (フレンド)
  - Lyrics: Mami Yamada
  - Composition: Keisuke Yamazaki
  - Arrangement: Kengo Minamida
8. "Kira☆Power ~Dream Academy Ver." (Kira☆Power 〜ドリームアカデミー Ver.〜)
  - Lyrics: Aki Hata
  - Composition/Arrangement: Sho Ishihama (Monaca)

=== Shining Star ===
Shining Star

Greatest hits album by Star☆Anis
- Released: February 11, 2015
- Label: Lantis

Star☆Anis chronology
Cute Look	Shining Star	Joyful Dance

TV Anime/Data Carddass "Aikatsu!" Best Album 2 - Shining Star (TVアニメ/データカードダス『アイカツ！』ベストアルバム Shining Star*) is the second best album of the Aikatsu! series, the album released on February 11, 2015. The album also reached 2nd position on Oricon's daily chart on its release day.

==== Track listing ====
▼ disc - 1

1. "Kira☆Power"
  - Lyrics: Aki Hata
  - Composition/Arrangement: Kakeru Ishihama (Monaca)
2. "Idol Activity! (Ver. Rock) ~Seira Solo Ver.~" (アイドル活動！ (Ver. Rock) ～セイラソロ Ver.～, Aidoru Katsudo! (Ver. Rock) ~Seira Soro Ver.~)
  - Lyrics: uRy
  - Composition/Arrangement: Hidekazu Tanaka (Monaca)
3. "Magical Time ~Kii Solo Ver.~" (マジカルタイム ～きいソロ Ver.～, Majikaru Taimu ~Kii Soro Ver.~)
  - Lyrics: Saori Codama
  - Composition/Arrangement: Kuniyuki Takahashi (Monaca)
4. "Arabian Romance ~Sora Solo Ver.~" (アラビアンロマンス ～そらソロ Ver.～, Arabian Romansu ~Sora Soro Ver.~)
  - Lyrics: Saori Codama
  - Composition/Arrangement: Takao Nagatani
5. "Aurora Princess ~Maria Solo Ver.~" (オーロラプリンセス ～マリアソロ Ver.～, Ōrora Purinsesu ~Maria Soro Ver.~)
  - Lyrics: Aki Hata
  - Composition/Arrangement: Keigo Hoashi (Monaca)
6. "Adult Mode ~Mikuru Solo Ver.~" (オトナモード ～みくるソロ Ver.～, Otona Mōdo ~Mikuru Soro Ver.~)
  - Lyrics: Natsumi Hayashi
  - Composition/Arrangement: Yusuke Naruse
7. "Smiling Suncatcher" (笑顔のSuncatcher, Egao no Suncatcher)
  - Lyrics: Natsumi Tadano
  - Composition/Arrangement: Takao Nagatani
8. "Eternally Flickering Flame" (永遠の灯, Eien no Akari)
  - Lyrics: tom.m
  - Composition/Arrangement: Kengo Minamida/Integral Clover
9. "stranger alien"
  - Lyrics: Natsumi Tadano
  - Composition/Arrangement: Keiichi Okabe (Monaca)
10. "Dance in the rain"
  - Lyrics: uRy
  - Composition/Arrangement: Hidekazu Tanaka (Monaca)
11. "Original Star ~Ichigo & Akari Ver.~" (オリジナルスター☆彡 ～いちご&あかり Ver.～, Orijinaru Sutā ~Ichigo & Akari Ver.~)
  - Lyrics: Saori Codama
  - Composition/Arrangement: Hidekazu Tanaka (Monaca)

▼ disc - 2

1. "Happy Crescendo" (ハッピィクレッシェンド, Happī Kuresshendo)
  - Lyrics: Junko Tsuji
  - Composition/Arrangement: Kakeru Ishihama (Monaca)
2. "Sweet Sp!ce"
  - Lyrics: Junko Tsuji
  - Composition/Arrangement: oriori
3. "Kira・pata・shining ~Sora & Ran Ver.~" (Kira・pata・shining 〜そら&蘭 Ver.〜)
  - Lyrics: Natsumi Tadano
  - Composition/Arrangement: PandaBoY
4. "The Only Fascinating Treasure!" (ミトレジャーノ！, Mitore Jāno!)
  - Lyrics: Natsumi Tadano
  - Composition/Arrangement: Keigo Hoashi (Monaca)
5. "New Chocolate Case" (新・チョコレート事件, Shin • Chokorēto Jiken)
  - Lyrics: Aki Hata
  - Composition/Arrangement: Hidekazu Tanaka (Monaca)
6. "CHU-CHU♡RAINBOW"
  - Lyrics: Saori Codama
  - Composition/Arrangement: Keiichi Hirokawa (Monaca)
7. "Dancing☆Baby" (ダンシング☆ベイビー, Danshingu☆Beibī)
  - Lyrics: Natsumi Watanabe
  - Composition/Arrangement: Masashi Hamauzu
8. "Melody of the Heart" (ハートのメロディー, Hāto no Merodī)
  - Lyrics: Leo Kanda
  - Composition/Arrangement: Shogo Ohnishi
9. "Idol Activity! ~Akari Solo Ver.~" (アイドル活動！ ～あかりソロ Ver.～)
  - Lyrics: uRy
  - Composition/Arrangement: Hidekazu Tanaka (Monaca)
10. "Precious~Mizuki Solo Ver.~" (Precious ～美月ソロ Ver.～)
  - Lyrics: Junko Tsuji
  - Composition/Arrangement: Keigo Hoashi (Monaca)
11. "Friend" (フレンド)
  - Lyrics: Mami Yamada
  - Composition/Arrangement: Keisuke Yamasaki/Kengo Minamida
12. "Shining Line* ~All Stars Ver.~"
  - Lyrics: Saori Codama
  - Composition/Arrangement: Kakeru Ishihama (Monaca)

=== Joyful Dance ===
Joyful Dance

EP by Aikatsu☆Stars!
- Released: June 24, 2015
- Label: Lantis

Aikatsu☆Stars! chronology
Shining Star	Joyful Dance

TV Anime "Aikatsu!" 3rd Season Insert Song Mini Album - Joyful Dance (TVアニメ/データカードダス『アイカツ!』3rdシーズン挿入歌ミニアルバム Joyful Dance) is the four mini album of the series Aikatsu!. Released on June 24, 2015.

==== Track listing ====
1. "Pretty Pretty"
  - Lyrics: Natsumi Watanabe
  - Composition/Arrangement: connie
2. "Blooming♡Blooming"
  - Lyrics: Saori Codama
  - Composition/Arrangement: Keiichi Hirokawa (Monaca)
3. "MY SHOW TIME!"
  - Lyrics: Tomohiro Akiura
  - Composition: Tomoyoshi Suzuki
  - Arrangement: Integral Clover
4. "Lovely☆Bomb" (ラブリー☆ボム, Raburī☆Bomu)
  - Lyrics: tzk
  - Composition: Keisuke Yamasaki
  - Arrangement: Yusuke Naruse
5. "Love Like Caramelize" (恋するみたいなキャラメリゼ, Koisuru Mitai na Kyaramerize)
  - Lyrics: Junko Tsuji
  - Composition/Arrangement: Kakeru Ishihama (Monaca)
6. "Poppin' Bubbles"
  - Lyrics: AM42
  - Composition/Arrangement: mito
7. "Enchanted Party" (魅惑のパーティー, Miwaku no Pātī)
  - Lyrics: Ayumi Tamura
  - Composition/Arrangement: Narasaki
8. "Hello New World" (ハローニューワールド, Harō Nyū Wārudo)
  - Lyrics: Saori Codama
  - Composition/Arrangement: Keigo Hoashi (Monaca)
9. "Pretty Pretty" (off vocal)
10. "Blooming♡Blooming" (off vocal)
11. "MY SHOW TIME!" (off vocal)
12. "Lovely☆Bomb (ラブリー☆ボム) (off vocal)
13. "Love Like Caramelize" (恋するみたいなキャラメリゼ) (off vocal)
14. "Poppin' Bubbles" (off vocal)
15. "Enchanted Party" (魅惑のパーティー) (off vocal)
16. "Hello New World" (ハローニューワールド) (off vocal)

=== Colorful Smile ===
Colorful Smile

EP by Aikatsu☆Stars!
- Released: August 26, 2015
- Label: Lantis

Aikatsu☆Stars! chronology
Joyful Dance	Colorful Smile	Wonderful Tour

TV Anime "Aikatsu!" 3rd Season Insert Song Mini Album 2 - Colorful Smile (TVアニメ/データカードダス『アイカツ!』3rdシーズン挿入歌ミニアルバム2 Colorful Smile) is the fifth mini album of the series Aikatsu!. Released on August 26, 2015.

==== Track listing ====
1. "Hey! little girl"
  - Lyrics: Ayako Nakanomori, KIKOMARU
  - Composition/Arrangement: Ayako Nakanomori
2. "Chica×Chica"
  - Lyrics: Izumi Soratani [空谷泉身]
  - Composition/Arrangement: Yusuke Naruse (onetrap)
3. "Summer☆Magic" (サマー☆マジック)
  - Lyrics: tzk
  - Composition: Tomohiro Akiura [秋浦智裕]
  - Arrangement: Yusuke Naruse (onetrap)
4. "Light Pink Day Tripper" (薄紅デイトリッパー, Usubemi Dei Torippā)
  - Lyrics: Hiroyuki Onoda (Hifumi)
  - Composition/Arrangement: fu_mou (Hifumi)
5. "Sweet Heart Restaurant"
  - Lyrics: Hitomi Otsuka [大塚ひとみ]
  - Composition: Tomohiro Akiura
  - Arrangement: Hiroaki Yokoyama (agehasprings)
6. "Emerald Magic" (エメラルドの魔法, Emerarudo no Mahou)
  - Lyrics: Natsumi Tadano
  - Composition/Arrangement: kensuke ushio
7. "Little beat, Little wing♪" (リルビーリルウイン♪, Riru Bii Riru Uin)
  - Lyrics: Saori Codama
  - Composition/Arrangement: Watchman
8. "Lovely Party Collection (Stars! ver.)"
  - Lyrics: Saori Codama
  - Composition/Arrangement: Kakeru Ishihama (Monaca)
9. "Hey! little girl" (off vocal)
10. "Chica×Chica" (off vocal)
11. "Summer☆Magic" (サマー☆マジック) (off vocal)
12. "Light Pink Day Tripper (薄紅デイトリッパー) (off vocal)
13. "Sweet Heart Restaurant" (off vocal)
14. "Emerald Magic" (エメラルドの魔法) (off vocal)
15. "Little beat, Little wing♪" (リルビーリルウイン♪) (off vocal)

=== Wonderful Tour ===
Wonderful Tour

EP by Aikatsu☆Stars!
- Released: January 27, 2016
- Label: Lantis

Aikatsu☆Stars! chronology
Colorful Smile	Wonderful Tour

TV Anime "Aikatsu!" 4th Season Insert Song Mini Album Wonderful Tour (TVアニメ/データカードダス『アイカツ!』4thシーズン挿入歌ミニアルバム Wonderful Tour) is the first CD release of the 2016 Series. Released on January 27, 2016.

1. "Promise Carat" (約束カラット, Yakusoku Karato)
  - Lyrics: Natsumi Tadano
  - Composition/Arrangement: Takao Nagatani
2. "Lonely・Gravity" (ロンリー・グラヴィティ, Ronrii・Guraviti)
  - Lyrics: Genmai
  - Composition/Arrangement: Shōgo Ōnishi
3. "Queen of Roses" (いばらの女王, Ibara no Joō)
  - Lyrics: Saori Codama
  - Composition: Narasaki
  - Arrangement: Watchman
4. "Love Game"
  - Lyrics: Sinbyi
  - Composition: Ryota Nakano
  - Arrangement: Shōgo Ōnishi (agehasprings)
5. "Miel Miere" (ミエルミエール, Mieru Miēru)
  - Lyrics: Saori Codama
  - Composition/Arrangement: Kakeru Ishihama
6. "Hello Hello" (ハロー ハロー, Harō Harō)
  - Lyrics: tom.m
  - Composition: Keisuke Yamazaki
  - Arrangement: Yusuke Naruse (onetrap)
7. "Happiness Equation" (シアワセ方程式, Shiawase Hōteishiki)
  - Lyrics: Junsara Tsuji
  - Composition/Arrangement: Keigo Hoashi
8. "Run･Run･Du･Du･Run!" (ラン･ラン･ドゥ･ラン･ラン！, Ran･Ran･Du･Ran･Ran!) (Bonus Track 1)
9. "Promise Carat" (約束カラット, Yakusoku Karato) (off vocal)
10. "Lonely・Gravity" (ロンリー・グラヴィティ, Ronrii・Guraviti) (off vocal)
11. "Queen of Roses" (いばらの女王, Ibara no Joō) (off vocal)
12. "LOVE GAME" (off vocal)
13. "Miel Miere" (ミエルミエール, Mieru Miēru) (off vocal)
14. "Hello Hello" (ハロー ハロー, Harō Harō) (off vocal)
15. "Happiness Equation" (シアワセ方程式, Shiawase Hōteishiki) (off vocal)
16. "Run･Run･Du･Du･Run!" (ラン･ラン･ドゥ･ラン･ラン！, Ran･Ran･Du･Ran･Ran!) (off vocal) (Bonus Track 2)

== Original soundtracks ==
=== Aikatsu! Music!! 01 ===
Aikatsu! Music!! 01

Soundtrack album by Monaca
- Released: October 25, 2013
- Label: Lantis

TV Anime/Data Carddass "Aikatsu!" Original Soundtrack - Aikatsu! Music!! 01 (TVアニメ / データカードダス「アイカツ！」オリジナルサウンドトラック アイカツ！の音楽!! 01) is the first Original Soundtrack of Aikatsu! TV Anime Series. The CD was released on October 25, 2013.

==== Track listing ====
1. "Signalize!" （TV-size）
  - Lyrics: Aki Hata
  - Composition: NARASAKI
  - Arrangement: SADESPER RECORD
2. "This Time's Story!" (今回のおはなし！, Konkai no Ohanashi!)
3. "Idol Activities Everyday!" (毎日がアイドル活動, Mainichi ga Aidoru Katsudō!)
4. "Just a Bit Break" (ちょっと一休み, Chotto Hitoyasumi)
5. "Everyone's Supporting by Their Will" (応援してくれるみんな, Ōen Shite Kureru Minna)
6. "Memories of That Day" (あの日の思い出, Ano Hi no Omoi De)
7. "Change the Rice Scoop to the Mic" (おしゃもじをマイクに変えて, Oshamoji o Maiku ni Kaete)
8. "Diamond Happy" (ダイヤモンドハッピー, Daiyamondo Happī)（TV-size）
  - Lyrics: Aki Hata
  - Composition/Arrangement: Kakeru Ishihama (Monaca)
9. "This is Starlight School" (ここはスターライト学園, Koko ha Sutāraito Gakuen)
10. "Together in Three Forever" (いつだって三人一緒, Itsudatte 3-nin Issho)
11. "The Top Idol's Aura" (トップアイドルのオーラ, Toppu Aidoru no Ōra)
12. "Love You~♪ Like that~" (らぶゆ～♪なのです～, Rabu Yu~♪ Na no Desu~)
13. "Intensive Training...?" (特訓…？, Tokkun…?)
14. "It's Still Intensive Training!" (まだまだ特訓！, Mada Mada Tokkun!)
15. "To Become a True Idol..." (真のアイドルになるには…, Shin no Aidoru ni Naru ni ha…)
16. "Close Friend Becomes Rival, Rival Becomes Close Friend" (親友でライバル、ライバルで親友, Shin'yū de Raibaru, Raibaru de Shin'yū)
17. "Legendary Idol・Masquerade" (伝説のアイドル・マスカレード, Densetsu no Aidoru・Masukarēdo)
18. "Eyecatch A" (アイキャッチA, Aikyacchi A)
19. "Everyone's Loved Pop'n Popcorn" (みんな大好きポップンポップコーン, Minna Daisuki Poppun Poppukōn)
20. "Eyecatch B" (アイキャッチB, Aikyacchi B)
21. "Playback" (プレイバック, Pureibakku)
22. "Normal Days of Hoshimiya Family" (星宮家の日常, Hoshimiya-Ke no Nichijō)
23. "How Incident Smells" (事件のにおい, Jiken no Nioi)
24. "I'll Suck Your Blood?" (血を吸うわよ？, Chi o Sūwa yo?)
25. "Kitaōji Theater Opens" (北大路劇場 開幕, Kitaōji Gekijō Kaimaku)
26. "Hello☆Super Idol" (Hello☆スーパーアイドル, Hello☆Sūpā Aidoru)
27. "Idol Professor" (アイドル博士, Aidoru Hakase)
28. "Harsh Reality" (厳しい現実, Kibishī Genjitsu)
29. "Odayaka janaiwa ne" (おだやかじゃないわね)
30. "A Fight in Earnest" (真剣勝負, Shinken Shōbu)
31. "Now, Audition!" (いざ、オーディション！, Iza, Ōdishon!)
32. "To Entertainers, Cards are Their Life" (芸能人はカードが命, Geinōjin ha Kādo ga Inochi)
33. "Hirari/Hitori/Kirari" (ヒラリ/ヒトリ/キラリ)（TV-size）
  - Lyrics: Natsumi Tadano
  - Composition/Arrangement: Keigo Hoashi (Monaca)
34. "Standing Ovation" (スタンディングオベーション, Sutandingu Obēshon)
35. "Large Landscape" (ひろがる景色, Hirogaru Keshiki)
36. "Real Idol" (本当のアイドル, Hontō no Aidoru)
37. "Calendar Girl" (カレンダーガール, Karendā Gāru)（TV-size）
  - Lyrics: Saori Kodama
  - Composition/Arrangement: Hidekazu Tanaka (Monaca)
38. "See You!" (また見てね！, Mata Mite ne!)
39. "Summer Summer Vacation!" (さまさまばけーしょん！, SamaSama Bakēshon!)（TV-size）
  - Lyrics: Professor Mizushima
  - Composition/Arrangement: Kuniyuki Takahashi (Monaca)
40. "Kiss of the Alice Blue" (アリスブルーのキス, Arisu Burū no Kisu)（TV-size）
  - Lyrics: Kenta Harada
  - Composition: Takayuki Sakamoto
  - Arrangement: Rey

==== Music composed by Monaca ====
- Hidekazu Tanaka [Track 2, 3, 4, 5, 7, 12, 21, 22, 27, 31]
- Kei'ichi Okabe [Track 6, 15, 16, 17, 19, 20, 28]
- Kakeru Ishihama [Track 10, 13, 14, 18, 23, 26, 29, 30, 36]
- Keigo Hoashi [Track 9, 11, 32, 34, 35, 38]
- Ryuichi Takada [Track 24, 25]
