= Yousei Teikoku =

Japanese band

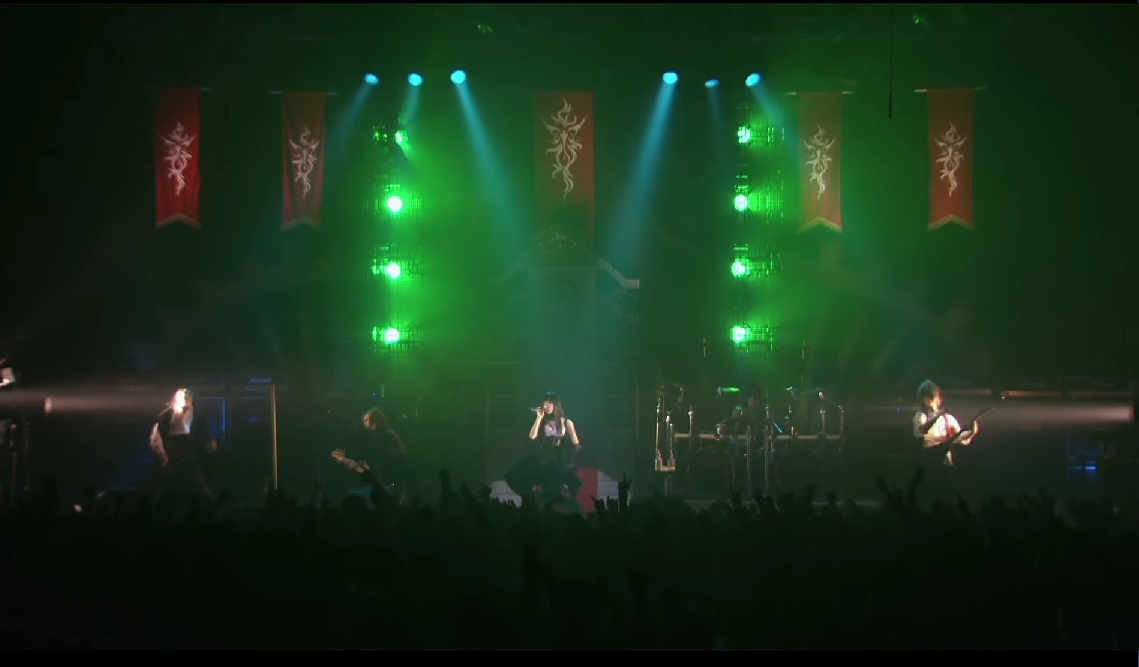
- Yousei Teikoku Live, Pax Vesania Tour, 2013

Background information
- Origin: Japan
- Genres: Gothic metal; dark wave; symphonic metal
- Years active: 1997–present
- Label: Lantis
- Members: Yui; Nanami; Gight; XiVa ryöga
- Past members: Relu; Shiren; Tachibana
- Website: www.dasfeenreich.com

Yousei Teikoku (Japanese: 妖精帝國, Hepburn: Yōsei Teikoku; German: Das Feenreich; lit. 'Fairy Empire') is a Japanese rock band formed in 1997. Their music mixes elements of gothic metal, heavy metal, electronic, and classical music. Their works include the opening tracks of several anime series, including Future Diary, Magical Pokan, Innocent Venus, Kurokami: The Animation, The Qwaser of Stigmata, Big Order, and the Tokyo ESP soundtrack. After releasing several independent albums, the band released seven major-label albums with their current label Lantis: Gothic Lolita Propaganda, Metanoia, Gothic Lolita Doctrine, Gothic Lolita Agitator, Pax Vesania, Shadow Corps(e) and The Age Of Villains.

Yousei Teikoku is led by vocalist Yui, whose official title is "Dictator for Life". She bestows honorary titles on the band members as part of the Fairy Empire.

== Band members ==
Current members

- Dictator for Life Yui (終身独裁官ゆい) – vocals, chorus, and lyrics (1997–present)
- Warrant Officer Nanami – bass guitar (2009–present)
- Sergeant Gight – drums (2013–present)
- Corporal XiVa – guitar (2019–present)
- Corporal ryöga – guitar (2019–present)

Former members

- Corporal Relu – drums (2009–2013)
- Master Sergeant Shiren (紫煉) – lead guitar (2013–2019)
- Captain Takaha Tachibana (橘 尭葉) – guitar, keyboards, composition, arrangement, and lyrics (1997–2019)

Prior to 2009, Yui and Tachibana were the group's only official members. Nanami and Relu were made official members that year. Shiren and Gight joined the band in 2013 at the same time as Relu's departure. Shiren resigned from the band, and was replaced by XiVa, who was announced as the band's new guitarist in January 2019. In June 2019, Tachibana announced that he would withdraw from future live performances with the band at the end of the month, but would continue to write songs for the band. Guitarist ryöga was announced as his on stage replacement, joining the band at the rank of corporal.

== Discography ==
=== Albums ===
- Atarashii Momo (新しい桃; "New Peach") (1996)
- Momo no Hane (桃の羽; "Peach Wings") (1997)
- Momo no Mori (桃の森; "Peach Forest") (1998)
- Shikō no Momo (至高の桃; "Supreme Peach") (1999)
- Stigma (2005)
- Gothic Lolita Propaganda (2007)
- Metanoia (2007)
- Irodori no Nai Sekai (彩の無い世界; "A World Without Color") (2009)
- Gothic Lolita Doctrine (2009)
- Gothic Lolita Agitator (2010)
- Pax Vesania (2013)
- Hades: The Other World (2014)
- Shadow Corps[e] (2015)
- The Age of Villains (2020)

=== Singles ===
- "Ashita wo Yurushite" (明日を許して; "Forgive Tomorrow") (2006) – PC video game AR ~Wasurerareta Natsu~ OP and ED
- "Senketsu no Chikai" (鮮血の誓い; "The Blood Oath") (2006) – TV anime Renkin 3-kyu Magical Pokaan OP
- "Noble Roar" (2006) – TV anime Innocent Venus OP
- "Valkyrja" (2006) – PlayStation 2 video game Mai-Otome Hime: Otome Butou Shi OP
- "Shijun no Zankoku" (至純の残酷; "The Purest Cruelty") (2007) – TV anime Venus Versus Virus ED
- "Schwarzer Sarg" (2008)
- "Hades: The Bloody Rage" (2008)
- "Weiß Flügel" (2008)
- "Gekkō no Chigiri" (月光の契り; "The Moonlight Pledge") (2009) – TV anime Kurokami The Animation ED
- "One" (2009) – PlayStation Portable video game Queen’s Blade: Spiral Chaos OP and ED
- "Tasogare no Getsuka" (誰そ彼の月華) (2009) – TV anime Katanagatari ED
- "Baptize" (2010) – TV anime Seikon no Qwaser OP
- "Rebellion Anthem" (2010)
- "Mischievous of Alice" (2011) – PlayStation Portable video game Queen’s Gate: Spiral Chaos OP and ED
- "Kūsō Mesorogiwi" (空想メソロギヰ; "Fantasy Mythology") (2011) – TV anime Mirai Nikki OP
- "Filament" (2012) – TV anime Mirai Nikki ED
- "Shito Kakusei" (使徒覚醒) (2014) – single includes "Kakusei, Iteru Tamashii to Unmei no Kyoukaisen" (覚醒、冱てる魂と運命の境界線) (OP) and "Shinken Ranbu" (神剣乱舞) (ED) from PlayStation 3 video game Kamisama to Unmei Kakusei no Cross Thesis
- "Kyūsei Argyros" (救世Άργυρóϛ) (2014) – TV anime Tokyo ESP ED
- "Disorder" (2016) – TV anime Big Order OP
- "Flamma Idola" (2017)

=== Other ===
- "Irodori no Nai Sekai" (from Irodori no Nai Sekai) – TV anime Kurokami The Animation ED
- "Tamakui" (from Gothic Lolita Doctrine) – TV anime Ga-Rei Zero insert song (also included in Ga-Rei -Zero- image CD Yuri-mu Croquette)
- "Asgard" (from Gothic Lolita Agitator) – PC video game fortissimo//Akkord:Bsusvier OP
- "Kuraki Sekai no Doukoku" (from Hades: The Other World) – PC video game fortissimo EXS//Akkord:nächsten Phase route OP
- "Shinteki Souzou" (from Hades: The Other World) – PC video game fortissimo FA//Akkord:nächsten Phase OP
- "Oroka na Ketsumatsu" (from Hades: The Other World) – TV anime Ika Musume image song
- "Dea x Crisis" (from Hades: The Other World) – PlayStation 3 video game Super Heroine Chronicle OP
- "Itoyuu no Shitade" (from Hades: The Other World) – PlayStation 3 video game Super Heroine Chronicle ED
- "Yami-Iro Corsage" (from Shadow Corps[e]) – mobile game Valiant Knights OP
- "Geki" (from Shadow Corps[e]) – TV anime Big Order OVA ED
- "Psychomachia" – TV anime The Seven Heavenly Virtues ED
- "Last Moment" (from Gothic Lolita Propaganda) – PlayStation 2 game Mai-Hime Unmei no Keitouju soundtrack
- "Hitohira no Shizuku" (from crystal2 ~CIRCUS Vocal Collection Vol.2~) – PC video game Tsui no Yakata ~Koibumi~ ED
- "memini [Orchestronica mix version]" (from crystal3 ~CIRCUS Vocal Collection Vol.3~) – PC video game AR ~Wasurerareta Natsu~ insert song
- "Tsukiyo no Senritsu" (from crystal3 ~CIRCUS Vocal Collection Vol.3~) – PC video game Tsui no Yakata ~Futatsuboshi~ ED
- "Koseijo no Uta" (from Songs from Eternal Fantasy) – PC video game Eternal Fantasy insert song
- "Tasogare no Gekka" (from Katanagatari Kakyokushuu Sono Ichi) – TV anime Katanagatari ED
- "Egoist" (from Mirai Nikki Inspired Album Vol.1 ~Ingaritsu Noise~) – TV anime Mirai Nikki image song
- "Herrscher" (from Mirai Nikki Inspired Album Vol.1 ~Ingaritsu Decibel~) – TV anime Mirai Nikki image song
- "Oroka na Ketsumatsu" (from Ika Love) – TV anime Ika Musume image song
- "Shito Raisan" (from Shito Raisan ~Kami-sama to Unmei Kakumei no Paradox Original Soundtrack~) – PlayStation 3 video game Kami-sama to Unmei Kakumei no Paradox image song

=== Tours ===
- Dai Rokkai Koushiki Shikiten Tour Pax Vesania Live Tour (2013)
- Tokuten Shiki Shikiten 920 Putsch (2010)
- Animelo Summer Live 2009 -Re:Bridge-
