= Bandai Namco Music Live =

Anime and music producer and distributor

Bandai Namco Music Live Inc.

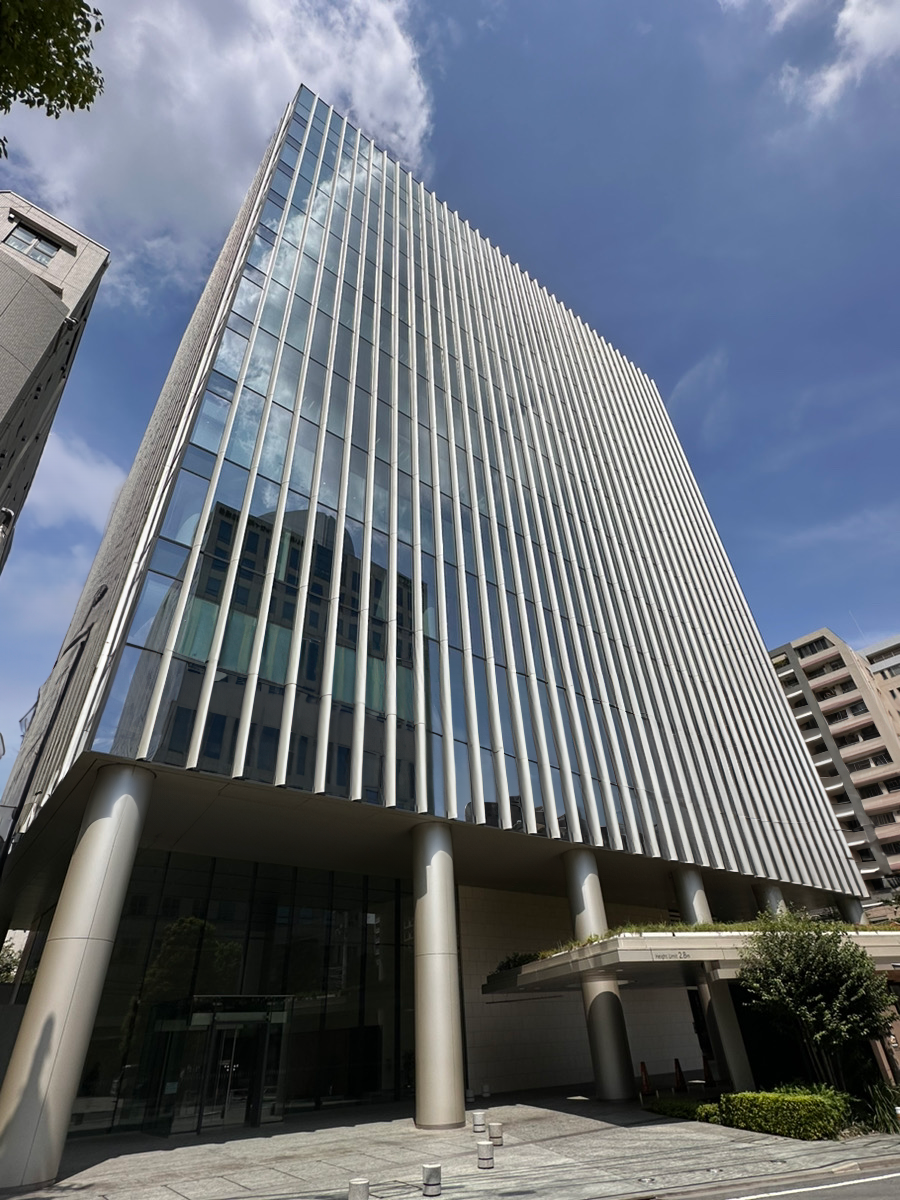
- Headquarters in Shibuya, Tokyo
- Native name: 株式会社バンダイナムコミュージックライブ
- Romanized name: Kabushiki gaisha Bandai Namuko Myujikku Raibu
- Formerly: AE Planning Inc. (1983–1989); Bandai Visual Sales Co., Ltd. (1989–1991); Bandai Visual Co., Ltd. (1991–2018); Bandai Namco Arts Inc. (2018–2022)
- Type: Subsidiary
- Traded as: TYO: 4325
- Industry: Music; Artist management
- Predecessor: Lantis Co., Ltd.
- Founded: August 23, 1983; 43 years ago (as AE Planning); April 1, 2018; 8 years ago (as Bandai Namco Arts)
- Headquarters: Ebisu, Shibuya, Tokyo, Japan
- Key people: Yoshitaka Tao (chairman); Makoto Asanuma (president)
- Revenue: ¥2.18 billion (US$13.78 million) (2020)
- Number of employees: 213 (as of April 2023)
- Parent: Bandai Namco Holdings
- Subsidiaries: Bandai Namco Music Frontier; Bandai Namco Base
- Website: bandainamcomusiclive.co.jp

Bandai Namco Music Live Inc., (Note: Japanese: 株式会社バンダイナムコミュージックライブ, Hepburn: Kabushiki gaisha Bandai Namuko Myujikku Raibu) formerly Bandai Namco Arts, is a Japanese company formed in 1983 as AE Planning Inc. The company was rebranded to Bandai Namco Arts in February 2018 by the merger of Bandai Visual and its subsidiary Lantis as part of a major group restructuring of its parent company, Bandai Namco Holdings. The company was responsible for anime production and distribution, and music production and distribution.

In 2022, the anime division was spun-off to Bandai Namco Filmworks and the company rebranded itself to Bandai Namco Music Live, solely focusing on music production and artist management.

== History ==
Previous logo used from 2018–2022

In February 2018, Bandai Namco Holdings announced that Lantis and its parent company Bandai Visual would merge to turn into a company called Bandai Namco Arts on April 1, 2018, doing the same business as the past two companies but being more related to each other as one entire company.

In October 2021, Bandai Namco Holdings announced the reorganization of the group. Sunrise will handle the newly combined visual business company, which will consist of Sunrise, Bandai Namco Arts' video contents, and Bandai Namco Rights Marketing. Bandai Namco Arts will focus on the music and live events company, which will consist of Bandai Namco Arts' music contents, Bandai Namco Live Creative, and Sunrise Music.

In March 2024, Bandai Namco Music Live announced it would open up a 2,000-seat concert hall based in Shibuya named Shibuya Lovez, with Bandai Namco Base as its operator. The hall is scheduled to open in spring 2026.

On February 5, 2026, it was announced that Bandai Namco Music Live would absorb Sotsu's music subsidiary, Sotsu Music Publishing with the changes taking place by April 1st of that year. Following this, the music publishing division was spun-off from BNMF and became a wholly-owned subsidiary known as Bandai Namco Music Frontier.

== Labels ==
=== Music Label ===
- Lantis - Main label
- Sunrise Music - Label related to Sunrise and Bandai Namco Pictures, distributed by The Orchard
- Kiramune - Male voice actor label
- Purple One Star - Label established in collaboration with bluesofa
- MoooD Records - Label focusing on creating smash hits with global perspective
- UNIERA - Label that brings out unique talents of its artist
- GloryHeaven - Label related to Sony Music Solutions
