= Lantis (company) =

Japanese music company

- Parent company: Bandai Namco Music Live
- Founded: 1999; 27 years ago
- Distributor: Bandai Namco Filmworks
- Genre: Anisong
- Country of origin: Japan
- Location: Tokyo, Japan

Lantis Co., Ltd.

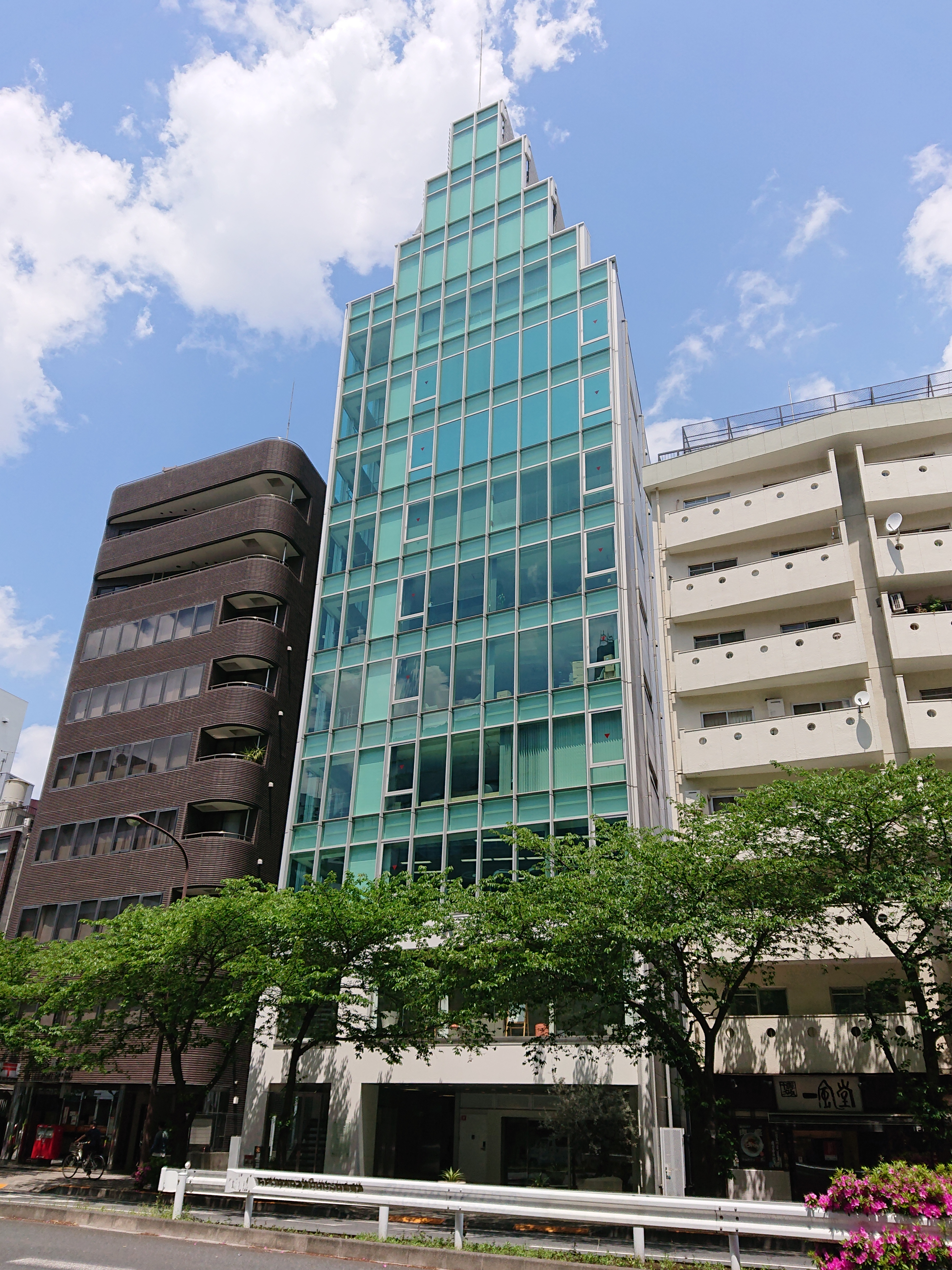
- Lantis' former headquarters in Shibuya, Tokyo
- Native name: 株式会社ランティス
- Romanized name: Kabushiki gaisha Rantisu
- Type: Music publisher
- Industry: Japanese music
- Founded: November 26, 1999; 26 years ago
- Defunct: April 1, 2018; 8 years ago
- Fate: Merged with Bandai Visual
- Successor: Bandai Namco Music Live
- Headquarters: Hiroo, Shibuya, Tokyo, Japan
- Key people: Shunji Inoue
- Revenue: ¥420.5 million
- Website: lantis.jp

Lantis Co., Ltd. (Note: Japanese: 株式会社ランティス, Hepburn: Kabushiki gaisha Rantisu) is a Japanese music label owned by Bandai Namco Music Live. Originally a company, it was established on November 26, 1999, and became a subsidiary of Bandai Visual in May 2006, itself a subsidiary of Bandai Namco Holdings. In February 2018, it was announced Lantis would be merged with Bandai Visual into a new company called Bandai Namco Arts. The reorganizing took effect on April 1, 2018. Lantis only remains as a label from the new company.

== Lantis merger with Bandai Visual ==
In February 2018, it was announced Bandai Visual would be merged with Lantis into a new branch of BNH, called Bandai Namco Music Live. The reorganizing took effect as of April 1. Bandai Visual remains only as a label of the new company.

== Sublabels ==
Lantis is composed of five labels:

- Lantis (main label, formerly distributed by King Records, currently self-distributed)
- Glory Heaven (distributed by Sony Music Entertainment Japan)
- Kiramune (self-distributed)
- Purple One Star (distributed by Sony Music Entertainment Japan, defunct)
- MoooD Records (distributed by Sony Music Entertainment Japan)
- UNIERA
- Mellow Head (distributed by NBCUniversal Entertainment Japan, defunct)

== Artists ==
- 2Hearts
- Ai Furihata (under Purple One Star)
- AiRI
- Ai Shimizu
- Aikatsu☆Stars!
- Aira Yūki
- Aki Hata
- Aki Misato
- Ali Project (transferred from Mellow Head, also work on other recording labels)
- Annabel
- Aqours
- ASH DA HERO (under MoooD Records)
- Aya Hirano
- Best Friends!
- Blood Stain Child
- Ceui
- CooRie
- Dai-ni Bun'gei-bu
- Daisuke Hirakawa
- Daisuke Ono
- Deardrops
- Eir Aoi
- Eufonius
- Faylan
- Fhána
- G.Addict
- Hekiru Shiina
- Hiromi Satō
- Hyadain
- Idolish7
- Ika Musume
- Kanae Itō
- Kazuma Kawamura (under the name L.E.I through MoooD Records)
- Kenichi Suzumura
- Kenshō Ono
- Konirata
- Koutaro Nishiyama
- Larval Stage Planning
- Lazy
- Liella!
- Mai Fuchigami
- Mai Nakahara
- Makoto Furukawa
- Marble
- Masami Okui
- Masumi Itō
- Megu Sakuragawa
- Megumi Ogata
- Mia Regina
- Milktub
- Minami Kuribayashi
- MindaRyn
- Minori Chihara
- Minoru Shiraishi
- Mitsuo Iwata
- Miyavi (under MoooD Records)
- Miyuki Hashimoto
- Natsuko Aso
- Nijigasaki High School Idol Club
- Nomico
- Nowlu
- Oldcodex
- Oranges & Lemons
- Oresama
- Outer-Tribe
- Passcode (under MoooD Records)
- Reina Ueda
- REIRIE (under MoooD Records)
- Rin
- Rionos
- Ririko
- Rita
- R.O.N (also under the name "Stereo Dive Foundation")
- Ryoko Shintani
- Sakura Nogawa
- Saori Atsumi
- Sayaka Sasaki
- Screen mode
- Sena
- SERRA (transferred from Purple One Star)
- Shizuka Itō
- Shō Hayami
- Shōjobyō
- Showtaro Morikubo
- Shugo Nakamura
- Snow*
- Sphere
- Star☆Anis
- StylipS
- Suara
- SV Tribe
- SZNO
- Takashi Utsunomiya (also under the name "U_Wave")
- Takuma Terashima
- Tasuku Hatanaka
- Tatsuhisa Suzuki
- Tetsuya Kakihara
- Toshiyuki Morikawa
- True
- Ui Miyazaki
- Ultra-Prism
- Wild San-nin Musume
- Yousei Teikoku
- Yozuca*
- Yūmao
- Yūki Kaji
- Yuko Goto
- Yuria
- Zaq
- μ's

=== Former artists ===
- Choucho
- Masaaki Endoh
- Fo'xTails
- GRANRODEO
- JAM Project
- Hironobu Kageyama
- Shuuhei Kita
- Hiroshi Kitadani
- Nano Ripe
