= List of Zenless Zone Zero characters =

Characters of 2024 action role-playing game

Zenless Zone Zero is a free-to-play action role-playing game developed and published by miHoYo. All playable characters are associated with a faction. Each character wields one of six attributes: Electric, Wind, Ether, Fire, Ice, or Physical. Additionally, each character adopts one of six combat styles: Anomaly, Attack, Defense, Rupture, Support, or Stun. In special cases, a character can possess a special attribute, adding on improvements to their base attribute. Notable characters include Hoshimi Miyabi and Yixuan, who possess Frost and Auric Ink respectively.

Zenless Zone Zero uses a gacha system as its core business model. This means that most of the game's revenue comes from sales on time-limited character "banners" during which players can spend in-game currency for the chance to acquire characters.

== Creation and design ==
According to Li Zhenyu, the producer of Zenless Zone Zero, there is no fixed process for designing a character; ideas for specific characters may come from the character design team or the scenario team. Li says that the development team has adopted a strategy of "backwards designing", where the character's movements and weapons were designed first, followed by the character design itself. By using this strategy, the design teams were able to more efficiently communicate with each other. Additionally, a character's design can be altered up until the last minute, and can even be altered after their physical appearance in the game. One major example of this was the design of Hoshimi Miyabi, in which her eye models were updated in Version 1.3, despite first appearing in Version 1.0.

Characters in Zenless Zone Zero have different designs based on their faction; For instance, the design for Victoria Housekeeping characters is based on Victorian-era butlers and maids with tropes from horror movies. The development team created characters based on previously unseen design elements, and there is an emphasis for quality over quantity in regards to development of characters.

Compared to design of characters in HoYoverse's previous games such as Genshin Impact and Honkai: Star Rail, Zenless Zone Zero took a different direction with its variety of playable characters; There are non-human playable characters such as Ben Bigger, a grizzly bear, Soukaku, a blue-colored oni, and Billy Kid, a cyborg gunslinger. During the planning stages, these non-human characters were not intended to be present in the game but the team did find them fun and later incorporated them into the game.

The development team cited Persona 5, Digimon World, and Street Fighter as influences for Zenless Zone Zero; influences from Street Fighter can be seen in combat animations for characters. Despite the similarities between Persona 5 and Zenless Zone Zero in terms of art style, the development team stressed that Zenless Zone Zero has its own unique style.

Prior to a character's official release in the game, HoYoverse promotes them by releasing teasers through social media. In addition to the main storyline, certain characters also have Agent Stories, which provide backstory and personality traits not fully explored in the main storyline.

== Phaethon ==
Phaethon is the Proxy alias of Wise and Belle, the main protagonists of the game. They run a VHS rental store called "Random Play", which doubles as a base for Proxy work.

- Wise (哲; Zhé) and Belle (铃; Líng)

Voiced by: Lin Jing (Chinese); Stephen Fu (English); Atsushi Abe (Japanese); Lee Sang-Ho (Korean) (Wise)
Voiced by: Hou Xiaofei (Chinese); Courtney Steele (English); Sayaka Senbongi (Japanese); Lee Sae-ah (Korean) (Belle)
The main protagonists of the game. Initially neither of the siblings participates in combat; instead, they sync with their Bangboo, Eous, to guide their clients through the Hollows, via their unique "Hollow Deep Dive" (HDD) system, until the manisfestation of Pyrois allows them to participate on-field combat. Players can choose between Belle (the younger sister) and Wise (the older brother) as the player character. The sibling that is not picked will assist the one that is picked throughout the game.

- Fairy

Voiced by: Da Wang (Chinese); Allegra Clark (English); Kaori Ishihara (Japanese); Kim Sung-hee (Korean)
A powerful AI installed into Random Play's inter-knot system that helps Phaethon with their Proxy activies. Part of 4 AI systems.

- Pyrois (佩洛伊斯; Pèiluòyīsī)

Voiced by: Unknown (all languages)
Phaethon's combat avatar.

== Independent factions ==
=== Cunning Hares ===
The Cunning Hares (formally known as Gentle House) is a small-scale temp work agency that takes on various commissions for clients who cannot or will not hire a larger (or more reputable) agency.

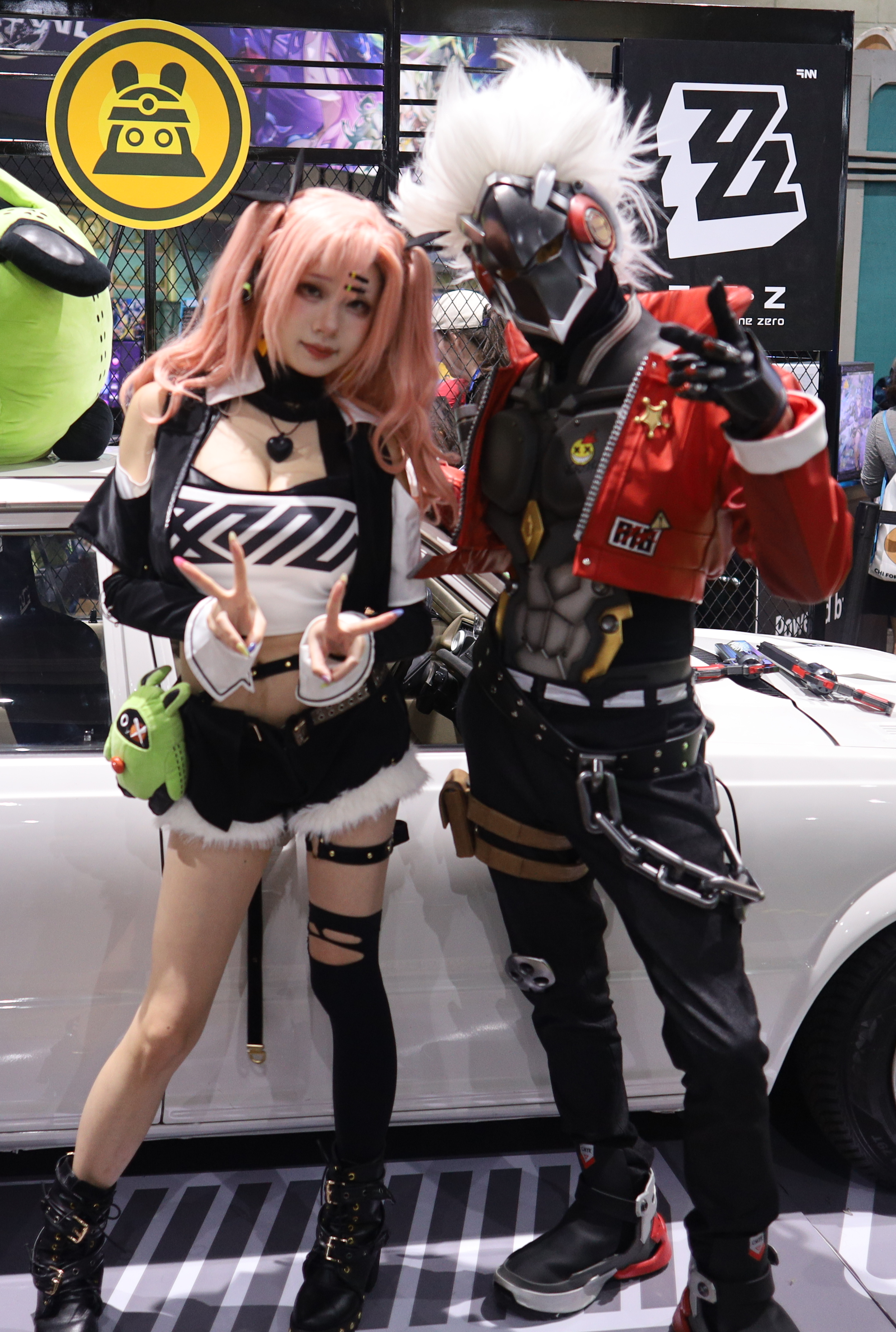
Cosplayers as Nicole Demara and Billy Kid

- Anby Demara (安比•德玛拉; Ānbǐ Démǎlā)

Voiced by: Yanning (Chinese); Sam Slade (English); Atsumi Tanezaki (Japanese); Kim Bo-na (Korean)
A calm and collected girl who is unusually competent and efficient in combat, but struggles in other aspects. She was originally known as "Soldier 0" (零号; Líng Hào), the captain of Silver Squad, a special forces unit of clone soldiers. After being found by Nicole, she adopts her family name.

- Billy Kid (比利•奇德; Bǐlì Qídé)

Voiced by: Chen Runqiu (Chinese); Clifford Chapin (English); Yū Hayashi (Japanese); Lee Jo-seung (Korean)
An energetic and intellectual gunslinger from the sapient robotic race of Intelligent Constructs that refers to his custom revolvers as his "girls" and is a superfan of a Super Sentai-like franchise called "Starlight Knights".

- Nekomiya Mana (猫宫又奈; Māogōng Yòunài) a.k.a. Nekomata (猫又; Māoyòu)

Voiced by: Hualing (Chinese); Alice Himora (English); Sayuri Hara (Japanese); Lee Bo-hee (Korean)
The mischievous catgirl Thiren of the group. Initially, she planned to have the Cunning Hares killed for their role in killing her former gang-mate Silver, but after seeing them try to rescue her former neighbors from the Vision Corporation's scheme, she decided to join them instead.

- Nicole Demara (妮可•德玛拉; Nīkě Démǎlā)

Voiced by: Chen Tingting (Chinese); Nadia Marshall (English); Yū Serizawa (Japanese); Shin Na-ri (Korean)
The savvy founder of the Cunning Hares who struggles to keep her group afloat financially due to her spending.

=== Belobog Heavy Industries ===
Belobog Heavy Industries is a company specializing in In-Hollow construction.

- Anton Ivanov (安东•伊万诺夫; Āndōng Yīwànnuòfū)

Voiced by: Xiao Zhai (Chinese); Alejandro Saab (English); Shinichiro Kamio (Japanese); Jang Seo-hwa (Korean)
The sharp-tongued and masculinity obsessed project manager who refers to his wrist-mounted drill as his "bro."

- Ben Bigger (本•比格; Běn Bǐgé)

Voiced by: Meng Xianglong (Chinese); Henry Schrader (English); Kenji Hamada (Japanese); Han Bok-hyun (Korean)
A hard-working grizzly bear Thiren who works as an accountant. Despite his imposing presence, Ben rarely gets angry outside of combat.

- Grace Howard (格莉丝•霍华德; Gélìsī Huòhuádé)

Voiced by: Xiao Gan (Chinese); Megan Shipman (English); Haruka Shiraishi (Japanese); Kim Yea-lim (Korean)
The eccentric engineer of the group with an enthusiasm of all things mechanical. She designs and programs heavy machinery for Belobog, referring to them as her "children."

- Koleda Belobog (珂蕾妲•贝洛伯格; Kēlěidá Bèiluòbǎigé)

Voiced by: Mu Xueting (Chinese); Emily Reams (English); Yuka Iguchi (Japanese); Jeong Hae-eun (Korean)
The feisty president of Belobog Heavy Industries.

=== Sons of Calydon ===
The Sons of Calydon is a biker gang that resides in the Outer Ring of New Eridu.

- Burnice White (柏妮思•怀特; Bǎinīsī Huáitè)

Voiced by: Ge Zirui (Chinese); Risa Mei (English); Karin Takahashi (Japanese); Bae Ha-gyoung (Korean)
An exuberant and enthusiastic young woman who wields dual flamethrowers. She is a very sociable person according to her groupmates.

- Caesar King (凯撒•金; Kǎisā Jīn)

Voiced by: Su Ziwu (Chinese); Jennifer Sun Bell (English); Rina Satō (Japanese); Kim Bo-Min (Korean)
A rambunctious and confident green-haired woman who uses a sword and spiked shield. Although she's the leader of the Sons of Calydon, Lucy claims she's as "simple" as a caesar salad. She has a prosthetic arm that came from Billy Kid.

- Lighter (莱特; Láitè)

Voiced by: Zhang Pei (Chinese); Aleks Le (English); Hiroki Takahashi (Japanese); Chung Eui-han (Korean)
An even-tempered and reticent man who serves as the Sons of Calydon's Champion, Caesar's right hand man and the gang representative. Lighter possesses overwhelming force and strength that he uses to solve problems in the Outer Ring.

- Luciana "Lucy" Auxesis Theodoro de Montefio (露西亚娜•奥克希斯•提奥多•德•蒙特夫; Lùxīyànà Àokèxīsī Tí'àoduō dé Méngtèfū)

Voiced by: Xian Ta Wutong (Chinese); Elsie Lovelock (English); Ayaka Asai (Japanese); Kim Mi-so (Korean)
A rebellious blond-haired young woman who travels with three tiny boar Thirens named "Grassy, "Woody" and "Bricky".

- Piper Wheel (派派•韦尔; Pàipài Wéi'ěr)

Voiced by: Wu Zheru (Chinese); Suzie Yeung (English); Manaka Iwami (Japanese); Son Jung-min (Korean)
A petite young woman who maintains a big rig she named "Steeltusk" for the Sons of Calydon. She acts and speaks like an old woman, prefers resting when not actively on the job.

- Pulchra Fellini (波可娜•费雷尼; Bōkěnà Fèiléiní)

Voiced by: Pan Danni (Chinese); Marissa Lenti (English); Natsumi Fujiwara (Japanese); Son Seon-young (Korean)
A sand cat Thiren. Initially working for a rival biker gang, she eventually joined the Sons of Calydon due to their ideals.

=== Mockingbird ===
Mockingbird is a notorious phantom thief syndicate in New Eridu.

- Hugo Vlad (雨果•维拉德; Yǔguǒ Wéilādé)

Voiced by: Liang Dawei (Chinese); Jimmie Yamaguchi (English); Jun Fukuyama (Japanese); Kim Hye-sung (Korean)
A dapper vampire gentleman and former illegitimate member of the Ravenlock family. He founded Mockingbird alongside Von Lycaon.

- Vivian Banshee (薇薇安•班希; Wēiwēi'ān Bānxī)

Voiced by: Chen Yang (Chinese); Sarah Wiedenheft (English); Saku Mizuno (Japanese); Jang Mi (Korean)
A mysterious woman with a great obsession with Phaethon. She has the ability to see people's deaths in the future.

=== Spook Shack ===
Spook Shack is an online forum dedicated to sharing and solving supernatural mysteries and unexplained phenomena.

- Alice Thymefield (爱丽丝・泰姆菲尔德; Àilìsī Tàimǔfēiěrdé)

Voiced by: Duoduo (Chinese); Diana Garnet (English); Minami Tanaka (Japanese); Park Shi-yoon (Korean)
An uptight, blond-haired Netherland Dwarf rabbit Thiren lady who is a member of the prestigious Thymefield family.

- Komano Manato (狛野真斗; Bóyě Zhēndǒu)

Voiced by: Li Zhuoting (Chinese); Ricco Fajardo (English); Kazuyuki Okitsu (Japanese); Seo Jung-ik (Korean)
A stalwart, muscular red-haired coyote Thiren and Yuzuha's childhood friend. He is very protective to the Failume Heights community and hates those that try to harm and exploit them.

- Lucia Elowen (卢西娅・艾洛温; Lúxīyà Àiluòwēn)

Voiced by: Liang Shuang (Chinese); Nola Klop (English); Rio Tsuchiya (Japanese); Seo Jeongmin (Korean)
An eager blue-haired goat Thiren who is an avid Ethereal enthusiast. She carries an encyclopedia filled with stories on Ethereals.

- Ukinami Yuzuha (浮波柚叶; Fúbō Yùyè)

Voiced by: Jin Na (Chinese); Kimberly Tierney (English); Ikumi Hasegawa (Japanese); Kim Seon-joo (Korean)
A puckish, red-haired young woman who is accompanied with her pet tanuki named Kama who is strapped to her back.

- Yidhari Murphy (伊德海莉・墨菲; Yīdéhǎilì Mòfēi)

Voiced by: Zhang Ye (Chinese); Katelyn Barr (English); Yumi Hara (Japanese); Kim Seo-hyun (Korean)
A blonde, soft-spoken octopus Thiren who, like Phaethon, is also a Proxy.

=== Angels of Delusion ===
The Angels of Delusion is an emerging idol trio in New Eridu.

- Aria (爱芮; Àiruì)

Voiced by: Jingchen (Chinese); Rebecca Wang (English); Kaori Maeda (Japanese); Cha Young-hee (Korean)
A demure but optimistic Intelligent Construct who is the lead vocalist and face of the group.

- Nangong Yu (南宫羽; Nángōng Yǔ)

Voiced by: Du Qingqing (Chinese); Michelle Marie (English); Kanon Takao (Japanese); Lim-Ji yeon (Korean)
A Thiren (type unspecified), and the carefree and impish captain of the group. She is also their lead dancer.

- Sunna (千夏; Qiānxià)

Voiced by: Muya Ruilin (Chinese); Alexis Tipton (English); Yuuka Morishima (Japanese); Lee Seul (Korean)
The introspective but nervous lead composer of the group.

=== Covenant of Dayat ===
- Remielle Dan (蕾米埃尔・丹; Lěimǐ'āi'ěr Dān)

Voiced by: Cucu (Chinese); Amber Lee Connors (English); Saori Ōnishi (Japanese); Chae-rim (Korean)
An enigmatic but coy winged Thiren who is one of the first Void Hunters from over 100 years before the events of the main story.

== New Eridu City Administration ==
The New Eridu City Administration is the government of New Eridu. They have control over New Eridu Public Security (NEPS or PubSec) and the Hollow Investigative Association (HIA), as well as influence in the New Eridu Defense Force.

=== Victoria Housekeeping Co. ===
Victoria Housekeeping Co. is an agency specializing in housekeeping services, though they will also take on jobs that require venturing into the Hollows to acquire items for their client. They are led by the mayor of New Eridu.

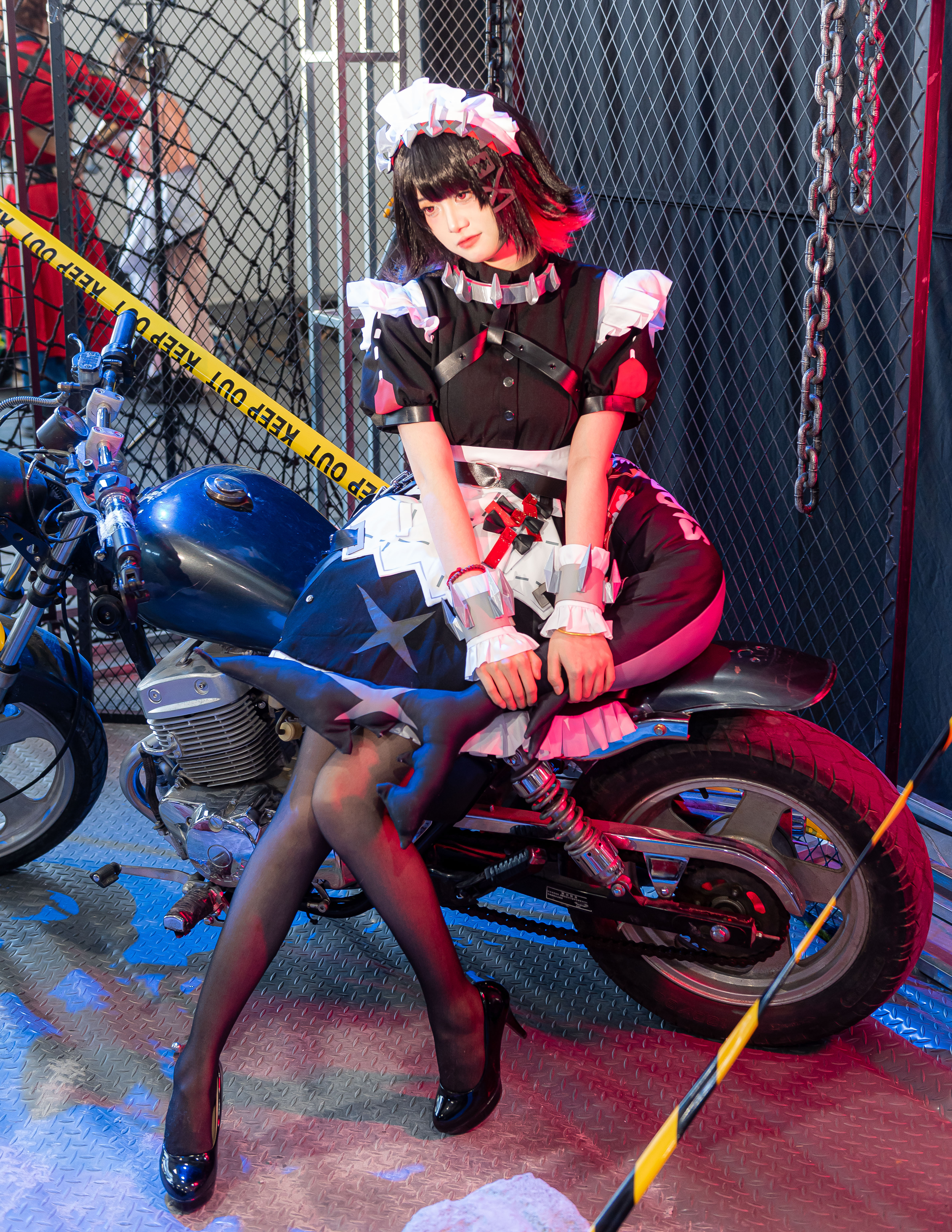
A cosplayer as Ellen Joe

- Alexandrina "Rina" Sebastiane (亚历山德丽娜•莎芭丝缇安; Yàlìshāndélìnà Shābāsītí'ān)

Voiced by: Zhang Ruoyu (Chinese); Morgan Lauré (English); Satomi Arai (Japanese); Lee Eun-jo (Korean)
The gentle head maid, often accompanied by two floating Bangboo puppets named Drusilla and Anastella.

- Corin Wickes (可琳•威克斯; Kělín Wēikèsī)

Voiced by: Mu Fei (Chinese); Chloe Eves (English); Hiromi Igarashi (Japanese); Cho Kyung-yi (Korean)
A timid and anxious maid who has notable self-esteem and confidence issues.

- Ellen Joe (艾莲•乔; Àilián Qiáo)

Voiced by: Xiao Qingyuan (Chinese); Giselle Fernandez (English); Shion Wakayama (Japanese); Lee Ji-na (Korean)
A deadpan mako shark Thiren girl who prefers resting and hanging out with her friends Lynn, Mona and Ruby to doing extra work or club activities.

- Von Lycaon (冯•莱卡恩; Féng Láikǎ'ēn)

Voiced by: Wang Yuhang (Chinese); Will de Renzy-Martin (English); Chikahiro Kobayashi (Japanese); Jang Min-hyeok (Korean)
A refined white wolf Thiren who acts as the Head Butler, using a kick-based fighting style to dispatch enemies with his cybernetic legs. He is also a former member of Mockingbird.

=== Criminal Investigation Special Response Team ===
The Criminal Investigation Special Response Team is an agency specializing in law enforcement and investigation. They are part of New Eridu Public Security.

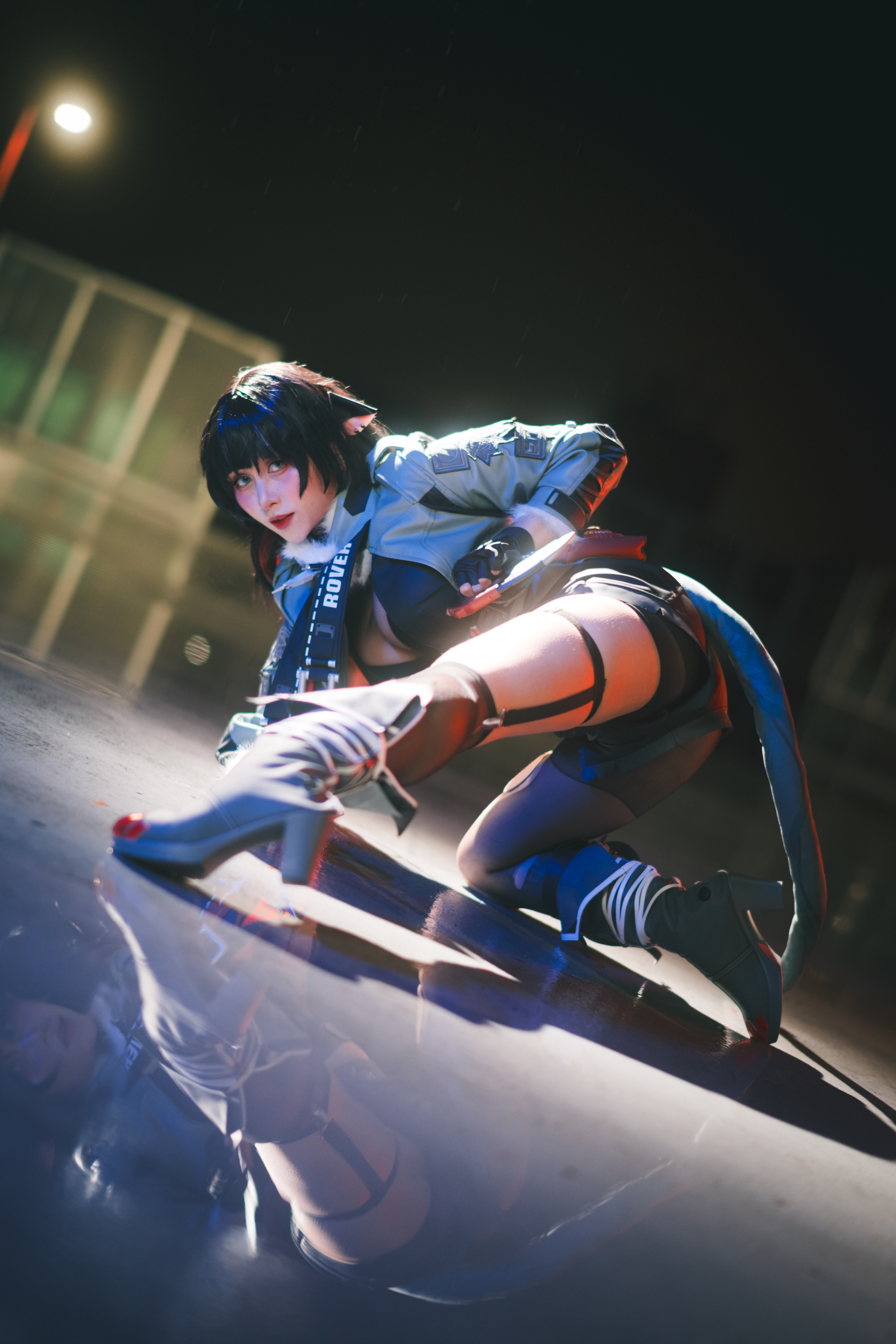
A cosplayer as Jane Doe

- Jane Doe (简•杜; Jiǎn Dù)

Voiced by: Zeng Tong (Chinese); Kelsey Jaffer (English); Yū Shimamura (Japanese); Jang Ye-na (Korean)
A cunning rat Thiren woman who is a criminal behavior specialist and undercover operative for PubSec who uses her wits to destroy criminal gangs from the inside.

- Qingyi (青衣; Qīngyī)

Voiced by: Hao Sibai (Chinese); Kira Buckland (English); Maria Abo (Japanese); Kim Soon-mi (Korean)
A green-haired gynoid, whose official designation is 01 Neo-Genesis VI. She is a Rookie Officer in the group.

- Seth Lowell (赛斯•洛威尔; Sàisī Luòwēi'ěr)

Voiced by: Xiu Yuan (Chinese); Nazeeh Tarsha (English); Kengo Takanashi (Japanese); Lim Chae-bin (Korean)
A white-haired lynx Thiren who is a Rookie Officer in the group. He is also the younger brother of Severian Lowell.

- Zhu Yuan (朱鸢; Zhū Yuān)

Voiced by: Mace (Chinese); Alaina Wis (English); Marina Inoue (Japanese); Lee Joo-eun (Korean)
The dutiful leader of the Criminal Investigation Special Response Team.

=== Metropolitan Order Division ===
The Metropolitan Order Division is a division of New Eridu Public Security.

- Cissia (希希芙; Xīxīfú)

Voiced by: Jiang Wen (Chinese); Erin Yvette (English); Fairouz Ai (Japanese); Kim I-an (Korean)
A slick and street-smart rattlesnake Thiren who serves as a case specialist. She has an incredibly powerful sense of smell, allowing her to detect enemies from far away.

- Severian Lowell (赛维里安・洛威尔; Sàiwéilǐ'ān Luòwēi'ěr)

Voiced by: Yang Chaoran (Chinese); Blythe Melin (English); Toshiyuki Morikawa (Japanese); Kim Min-ju (Korean)
The commissioner of New Eridu Public Security and older brother of Seth Lowell.

=== Hollow Special Operations Section 6 ===
Hollow Special Operations Section 6 (usually shortened to Section 6) is a frontline operational unit of the Hollow Special Operations.

- Asaba Harumasa (浅羽悠真; Qiǎnyǔ Yōuzhēn)

Voiced by: Xu Xiang (Chinese); Micah Solusod (English); Tetsuya Kakihara (Japanese); Chung Eui-taek (Korean)
An easygoing member of Section 6 who likes to drink coffee. He has a terminal illness, and as a result, has to take frequent off days from work.

- Hoshimi Miyabi (星见雅; Xīngjiàn Yǎ)

Voiced by: Ruan Congqing (Chinese); Cristina Vee (English); Ami Koshimizu (Japanese); Kim Do-hee (Korean)
The dignified Chief of Section 6 and black fox Thiren swordswoman who wields the Hoshimi Family's heirloom katana Tailless.

- Soukaku (苍角; Cāngjiǎo)

Voiced by: Liu Wen (Chinese); Rogin Rashidan (English); Machico (Japanese); Lee Ji-hyeon (Korean)
A blue oni girl who prefers talking about eating more than anything else. She is Yanagi's adopted sister.

- Tsukishiro Yanagi (月城柳; Yuèchéng Liǔ)

Voiced by: Ju HuaHua (Chinese); Corey Pettit (English); Kaori Nazuka (Japanese); Kwon Da-ye (Korean)
The methodical Deputy Chief of Section 6 and voice of reason in the unit. She is also Soukaku's guardian.

=== Obol Squad ===
The Obol Squad is a special forces-like squad under the command of the New Eridu Defense Force.

- Orphie Magnusson (奥菲丝・马格努森; Àofēisī Mǎgénǔsēn) and Magus (鬼火; Guǐhuǒ) / Orpheus (奥菲丝; Àofēisī)

Voiced by: Liu Shisi (Chinese); Dawn M. Bennett (English); Yume Miyamoto (Japanese); Ryu Ji-a (Korean)
Two conjoined members of Obol Squad. Magus, the current captain of Obol Squad, was originally a legendary soldier whose body was destroyed when Old Eridu fell. Her consciousness is a gun that is attached to the tail of Orphie, who is a clone of Magus herself.

- Seed (席德; Xídé) and Seed Sr. (老席德; Lǎo Xídé)

Voiced by: Su Wan (Chinese); Monica Rial (English); Kiyono Yasuno (Japanese); Yu Hye-ji (Korean) (Seed)
Voiced by: Zho Zihan (Chinese); Justice Washington (English); Tesshō Genda (Japanese); Gu Won (Korean) (Seed Sr.)
Two members of Obol Squad. Seed, whose real name is Flora (芙罗拉; Fúluólā), is a playful young girl who moves around on her hover scooter and Seed Sr. is Seed's mech that she pilots. Seed was saved by Seed Sr. during the fall of Old Eridu by fighting his own logic core who deemed her as a threat, resulting in severe damage and eventually resulting in his permanent shutdown.

- Soldier 11 (11号; Shíyī Hào)

Voiced by: Chen Yu (Chinese); Marina Aicholtz (English); Yukiyo Fujii (Japanese); Moon Yoo-jeong (Korean)
A steadfast member of Obol Squad whose real name is Harin (夏潾; Xiàlín). She is a clone of Anby Demara who was created as part of an initiative to create a division entirely of replica soldiers known as Silver Squad.

- Trigger (扳机; Bānjī)

Voiced by: Qin Ziyi (Chinese); Erica Mendez (English); Yoshino Nanjō (Japanese); Lim Eun-ji (Korean)
A blind, blond-haired sniper in Obol Squad. A veteran soldier who was blinded by an Ethereal attack during the Hollow Zero incident, her injures led to her other senses being heightened.

=== Yunkui Summit ===
Yunkui Summit is a martial arts temple based in Waifei Peninsula.

- Ju Fufu (橘福福; Jú Fúfú)

Voiced by: Xie Ying (Chinese); Lindsay Sheppard (English); Ayaka Suwa (Japanese); Kim Ye-ryeong (Korean)
A small South China tiger Thiren who is the disciple of Yixuan.

- Pan Yinhu (潘引壶; Pān Yǐnhú)

Voiced by: Wang Xigua (Chinese); Philip Sacramento (English); Ryōta Takeuchi (Japanese); Oh Gun-woo (Korean)
A panda Thiren who is also the monastery's cook.

- Ye Shunguang (叶瞬光; Yè Shùnguāng)

Voiced by: Tao Dian (Chinese); Kristen McGuire (English); M·A·O (Japanese); Kim Ha-ru (Korean)
A Thiren who was awarded the title of "Void Hunter" following her victory over The Creator, the leader of The Exaltists.

- Yixuan (仪玄; Yíxuán)

Voiced by: Zhang Yu (Chinese); Felicia Valenti (English); Mamiko Noto (Japanese); Su-hyeon (Korean)
The sagacious 13th High Preceptor of Yunkui Summit and mentor of Ju Fufu.

== The Outstanding Paragons Alliance ==
The Outstanding Paragons Alliance (usually shortened to "TOPS") is a consortium of some of the biggest businesses in New Eridu.

=== Krampus Compliance Authority ===
The Krampus Compliance Authority is a group that oversees all activities in The Outstanding Paragons Alliance (usually shortened as TOPS), making sure it aligns with the rules and interests of the alliance.

- Banyue (般岳; Bānyuè)

Voiced by: Liu Beichen (Chinese); Christopher Sabat (English); Show Hayami (Japanese); Kim Sang-baek (Korean)
A sapient and vigilant Intelligent Construct with a lion tail who wields floating spheres in battle. Originally a secret war machine, he saved the Ye siblings from a Hollow expansion.

- Dialyn (琉音; Liúyīn)

Voiced by: Cai Sujin (Chinese); Jad Saxton (English); Ayana Taketatsu (Japanese); Park Yi-seo (Korean)
A perky and sarcastic customer service representative of TOPS and Judge of the Krampus Compliance Authority.

- Phoenix Reffaella (菲欧妮・蕾法爱菈; Fēiōunī lěifǎàilā)

Voiced by: Song Yuanyuan (Chinese); Michaela Jill Murphy (English); Akane Fujita (Japanese); Song Ha-rim (Korean)
A bumbling Judge of the Krampus Compliance Authority.

- Promeia (普罗米娅; Pǔluómǐyà)

Voiced by: Yun He Zhui (Chinese); Natalie Van Sistine (English); Akari Kitō (Japanese); Jeon Hae-ri (Korean)
An icy and stoic Judge of the Krampus Compliance Authority, formerly a Sweeper of the Outer Ring.

- Zhao (照; Zhào)

Voiced by: Nuoya (Chinese); Siv Ryan (English); Naomi Ōzora (Japanese); Miso (Korean)
A small pink Mini Lop Thiren who is a Judge of the Krampus Compliance Authority. She has a fearsome reputation, whose diminutive and cutesy appearance belies a cutthroat nature.

=== Stars of Lyra ===
The Stars of Lyra are a famous musical group in New Eridu.

A cosplayer as Astra Yao

- Astra Yao (耀嘉音; Yào Jiāyīn)

Voiced by: Xiao N (Chinese); Molly Zhang (English); Aya Endō (Japanese); Yoon A-yeong (Korean)
A famous and carefree singer and actress in New Eridu.

- Evelyn Chevalier (伊芙琳•舒瓦利耶; Yīfúlín Shūwǎlìyē)

Voiced by: Li Chanfei (Chinese); Elizabeth Maxwell (English); Yoko Hikasa (Japanese); Jang Chae-yeon (Korean)
The calculating and disciplined manager and chaperone of Astra Yao. She is a former spy originally planted by a rival company with the codename "Scheele's Green", but later defected to Astra's side.

== Roscaelifer ==
Roscaelifer is a floating city located in New Eridu's classified airspace zone. It is governed by the Five Central Departments.

=== Administrative Affairs Department ===
The Administrative Affairs Department is the highest decision-making body in Roscaelifer.

- Eldreda Sunbringer (艾尔妲・挽昼; Ài'ěrdá Wǎnzhòu)

Voiced by: Zhang Ruoyu (Chinese); Erica Lindbeck (English); Sayaka Ohara (Japanese); So Yeon (Korean)
One of the three Sunbringers created by the original Sunbringer who is identical in resemblance to the original. She is the director of the Administrative Affairs Department.

=== Airspace Patrol Department ===
The Airspace Patrol Department maintains the security of Roscaelifer and its airspace.

- Lindverne Sunbringer (林德薇恩・挽昼; Líndéwēi'ēn Wǎnzhòu)

Voiced by: Zhang Ruoyu (Chinese); Erica Lindbeck (English); Sayaka Ohara (Japanese); So Yeon (Korean)
One of the three Sunbringers created by the original Sunbringer who resembles a teen-like version of the original. She is the director of the Airspace Patrol Department.

- Sigrid de L'Azur (希格莉德・德拉叙尔; Xīgélìdé délāxùěr)

Voiced by: He Ruofan (Chinese); Dani Chambers (English); Yūko Kaida (Japanese); Kang Hae-na (Korean)
A diligent and loyal horse Thiren who is a member of the prestigious de L'Azur family and the Deputy Administrative Director of the Airspace Patrol Department.

=== Central Computing Department ===
The Central Computing Department is responsible for calculating Rosetta Data, the master copy used to calibrate and check all Hollow data.

- Dracaene Sunbringer (德蕾琪娜・挽昼; Délěiqínà Wǎnzhòu)

Voiced by: Zhang Ruoyu (Chinese); Erica Lindbeck (English); Sayaka Ohara (Japanese); So Yeon (Korean)
One of the three Sunbringers created by the original Sunbringer whose appearance resembles a child-like version of the original. Earnest and kind, she is the director of the Central Computing Department.

=== External Strategy Department ===
The External Strategy Department serves as Roscaelifer's bridge to coordinate relations with the other districts of New Eridu.

- Norma Hollowell (诺姆・霍洛维尔; Nuòmǔ Huòluòwéi'ěr)

Voiced by: Wang Xiaotong (Chinese); Madeline Dorroh (English); Fūka Izumi (Japanese); Kim Yun-chae (Korean)
The bright and bubbly Chief Technician of the External Strategy Department.

- Velina Airgid (维琳娜・艾嘉德; Wéilínnà Àijiādé)

Voiced by: Zhang Anqi (Chinese); Rhiannon Moushall (English); Chiwa Saitō (Japanese); Shin On-yu (Korean)
The elegant and meticulous Administrative Director of the External Strategy Department.

=== Flint Workshop ===
The Flint Workshop is the sole producer and manufacturer of Porcelloy, a material that stabilizes the effect of Ether.

- Claret Flint (克拉蕾・弗林特; Kèlālěi Fúlíntè)

Voiced by: Liu Zhixiao (Chinese); Cassandra Lee Morris (English); Kana Ueda (Japanese); Lee I-ro (Korean)
The spunky, forthright head of the Flint family, the founders of Flint Workshop.

- Roxy Ifrita Pryce (洛克茜・伊芙莉塔・普莱斯; Luòkèxī Yīfúlìtǎ Pǔláisī)

Voiced by: Liu Yilei (Chinese); Bryn Apprill (English); Chinatsu Akasaki (Japanese); Lee Bo-yong (Korean)
A mild-mannered, bespectacled member of Flint Workshop. Due to her heart being replaced with Porcelloy, she requires regular doses of blood from the Flint family in order to stay alive, which she mostly gets from Claret.

== Crossover characters ==
=== Honkai: Star Rail ===
- Kafka (卡芙卡; Kǎfúkǎ)

Voiced by: Xu Hui (Chinese); Cheryl Texiera (English); Shizuka Itō (Japanese); Sa Moon-young (Korean)
A member of the Stellaron Hunters, known for being soft-spoken and incapable of feeling fear.

- Robin (知更鸟; Zhīgēngniǎo)

Voiced by: Qian Chen (Chinese); Alice Himora (English); Kaori Nazuka (Japanese); Shin On-yu (Korean); Chevy (song vocals)
An elegant Halovian singer from the planet of Penacony.

== Reception ==
The characters of Zenless Zone Zero have enjoyed positive reception, especially in terms of revenue: as Zenless Zone Zero is a gacha game, much of its revenue comes from sales of in-game currency players use to obtain characters. Most revenue comes from limited character banners. The mobile version grossed almost US$52 million in its first 11 days and US$100 million in its first month. Chinese video game news website GameLook estimated the total revenue from all platforms of the game for July 2024 to exceed CN¥ 2.2 billion (US$306 million).

Eurogamer reviewer Jessica Orr praised the design and intricacy of the backstories of the characters, writing that there's "a huge focus on individual characters in all of miHoYo's games, but the developer has never gone this far with letting you get involved with their everyday lives." Kotaku reviewer Willa Rowe wrote that Zenless Zone Zero's "high quality design extends to the rest of the game’s cast, each of whom is stylish and could very well be your new favorite character." Paste reviewer Jason Rodriguez praised the unique design and variety of characters while criticizing the perceived repetitiveness of starter playable characters (specifically Anby Demara, Billy Kid, and Nicole Demara).

Some reviewers have criticized the perceived oversexualization of certain characters. GamesRadar+ reviewer Austin Wood, when writing about the character Seed, highlighted the repeated emphasis on the character's feet, writing that Seed's animated teaser "is 18 seconds long, and in that time we see not one, but three shots of her feet." Polygon reviewer Ana Diaz wrote about the character Jane Doe, saying that "the studio known for being pretty horny has seemingly outhornied itself," referring to both Jane Doe's teaser trailer and character demo.

Additionally, the game has been criticized for having a disproportionate number of male characters compared to female characters, including reviewers from Pocket Tactics and Videogamer. Zenless Zone Zero producer Li Zhenyu confirmed in June 2025 that there will be more playable male characters in the future.
