= Miyabi (given name) =

- Pronunciation: [mʲi.ja̠.bʲi] approx: MYEE-YA-BEE
- Gender: Female

Origin
- Origin: Japanese
- Meaning: Different meanings depending on the kanji used

Miyabi (written: 雅, 都弥, 雅日; みやび in hiragana or ミヤビ in katakana ) is a feminine Japanese given name. Notable people with the name include:

- Miyabi Akiya (born 2008), Australian rhythmic gymnast
- Miyabi Inoue (井上 雅; born 1991), Japanese tennis player
- Miyabi Moriya (守屋 都弥; born 1996), Japanese footballer
- Miyabi Natsuyaki (夏焼 雅; born 1992), Japanese singer and member of Berryz Kobo
- Miyabi Oba (大庭 雅; born 1995), Japanese figure skater
- Miyabi Onitsuka (鬼塚 雅; born 1998), Japanese snowboarder
- Maria Ozawa, Japanese AV actress formerly known as Miyabi
- Miyabi Tago (田子 雅; born 1988), Japanese hurdler

== Fictional characters ==
- Miyabi (雅緋), a character in the video game series Senran Kagura
- Miyabi, a character in Xenoblade Chronicles 3
- Miyabi Aizawa (相沢 雅), a character in the manga series Great Teacher Onizuka
- Miyabi Fujiwara (藤原 みやび), a character in the anime series Aikatsu!
- Miyabi Kagurazaki (神楽崎 雅), a character in the manga series Ai Yori Aoshi
- Miyabi Kannagi (神凪 雅), a character in the light novel series Kono Naka ni Hitori, Imouto ga Iru!
- Miyabi Hotaka (穂高 みやび), a character in the light novel series Absolute Duo
- Miyabi Ōmichi (大道 雅), a character in the manga series GA Geijutsuka Art Design Class
- Miyabi Hoshimi (星見 雅), a character in the video game Zenless Zone Zero.

== See also ==
- Miyavi, a Japanese rock musician formerly known as Miyabi while in the band Dué le Quartz
