= List of Star Driver characters =

The main cast of Star Driver: Kagayaki no Takuto in front of Takuto's Cybody, "Tauburn". Clockwise from the center, Takuto, Wako, Kanako, Simone, Sugata, Reiji, Benio, Kate and Sarina.

This is a list of characters for the anime series Star Driver.

== Main characters ==
Takuto Tsunashi (ツナシ・タクト, Tsunashi Takuto) / "Galactic Pretty Boy" (銀河美少年, Ginga Bishōnen)
Voiced by: Mamoru Miyano
Protagonist hero and main character of the series and member of the Midnight Flight drama club. Piloting the Cybody Tauburn, one of the mecha formerly hidden in the island's ancient ruin, he is a Star Driver opposing the Kiraboshi Order of Cross to protect Wako, the Southern Shrine Maiden, from them. According to the Order, Takuto is the legendary "Ginga Bishonen" (Galactic Pretty Boy) and the greatest threat to their plans. He also has two of the legendary Twelve Star Swords: Émeraude and Sapphire, and his training in dual-wielding swordsmanship allows him to fight skillfully with one sword in each hand. With his bright and positive personality, the 15-year-old easily becomes a humorous favorite to all, often having many females fall in love with him, but Takuto says that before he received the scar on his chest, where he shortly after received his "Tau" mark, he was much more "closed." Coincidentally, he shares his birthday with Sugata. He also shows hints of a darker side to his personality, and seems to have had a dark past as well. He had a friend named Natsuo who was interested in flight but died from an unrevealed illness. He was abandoned by his father whom he believes to currently reside on the island. His father is later revealed to be Reiji Miyabi whose increasing interest in Cybodies eventually pushed him to leave to the island and abandon a woman he was having an affair with, Sora, when she was pregnant with Takuto. He was partially raised by his grandfather, who seemed to know much of the island's secrets and apparently bestowed Takuto with the Tau mark. He has also been shown to have extremely high athletic ability and senses, as well as showing hints of high intelligence. It has been implied that he is aware of the fact that some of his classmates and peers are members of Kiraboshi and easily recognized that Reiji is actually his father, despite he had not aged since he became a driver. Takuto is fiercely loyal to his friends, especially Wako and Sugata, and would go out of his way to help them. When Sugata attempts to seal Samekh by sacrificing his life, Takuto breaks Wako's seal and chases after Samekh, which is flying into space to absorb the libido from the whole world, and destroys it to save Sugata.
Sugata Shindō (シンドウ・スガタ, Shindō Sugata)
Voiced by: Jun Fukuyama
A member of the Midnight Flight drama club along with Wako and Takuto. According to the tradition of his family, he is engaged to Wako, one of the island's Shrine Maidens, who is also his childhood friend, but is aware of her growing interest in Takuto. He is calm, intelligent and for the most part emotionally reserved, but shown to be somewhat hasty at times when his friends are in danger. He is also the current Star Driver of the King Cybody, Samekh, a highly powerful but dangerous Cybody which all previous candidates to successfully apprivoise have fallen into a permanent coma. However, after apprivoising to save Wako from the Kiraboshi, he is able to awaken due to Takuto and Wako's efforts. He then is able to use his First Phase to assist Takuto in his battles. Coincidentally, he shares his birthday with Takuto. As the owner of the King Cybody, the Kiraboshi order vacated the leadership of the order's First Division "Emperor" to him in hopes that he would eventually claim it, and so he did after finding out that Kate is too; he joined the Kiraboshi for the sole purpose of sealing Samekh at the expense of his life. He is saved by Takuto when Takuto broke Wako's seal to chase after and destroy Samekh.
Wako Agemaki (アゲマキ・ワコ, Agemaki Wako)
Voiced by: Saori Hayami
A member of the Midnight Flight drama club. She is one of the "Shrine Maidens" whose powers prevent Cybodies from being activated outside of Zero Time. Not only does she serve this purpose, but her powers and existence creates a seal, the Southern Maiden Seal, that guards the secrets of the island. As long as the seal is intact, she, a maiden, is forbidden from leaving the island. If the seal breaks, the Cybodies would be able to leave the island as well. Her grandmother was meant to tell her about being a Maiden when she entered middle school, but she apprivoised on her own when she was in elementary school, granting her access of all memories stored in the Cybody she was in. She once aspired to become a singer; as a child she wanted to go to Tokyo to seek that dream, but her status as a Maiden barred her from doing so. She has been engaged to Sugata due to his family tradition since childhood. In episode 21, she asks to play opposite of Takuto in Night Flight's latest play, becoming a part of the infamous kiss scene. She has a small yellow fox-like pet named Vice (副部長, Fukubuchou; lit. Vice President) who seems to have an important "connection" to the drama club. The mark on her chest is the ancient letter Waw, which is where her Maiden Cybody's name derives from. At the end of the anime, she admits that she is deeply in love with both Takuto and Sugata and is jealous of Kate and Ruri for being loyal to the one person they love. When Sugata attempts to sacrifice himself to seal Samekh, Wako allows Takuto to break her seal, releasing the Cybodies from Zero Time which allows Takuto to chase after and destroy Samekh, ultimately saving Sugata.

== Glittering Crux Brigade ==
Reiji Miyabi (ミヤビ・レイジ, Miyabi Reiji) / Head (ヘッド, Heddo)
Voiced by: Akira Ishida
Leader of Glittering Star's second section also known as "Vanishing Age" Squad, he kept the North Maiden locked in a cage at his room after breaking her seal, and has proposed that the group leader who manages to defeat Takuto will become the order's main commander. He is president of the school's art club. His first phase is the Star Sword Diamond. After releasing the North Maiden from her cage, he is seen talking to Sugata who reinspires Reiji to go back into art. He returns to the Glittering Crux in episode 16, using his Star Sword Diamond to break Mizuno's seal and destroy the Cybody Memma. His Cybody, Reshbal, is similar to Tauburn in appearance and powers. His real name is 'Tokio Tsunashi,' and he is actually Takuto's father. Despite being of the lineage of the Tau mark, his father did not pass his mark to him, and Resh mark was given to him by Ryousuke, and after having his Cybody defeated, he managed to have Shingo give his mark to him, thus he managed to take control of another Cybody, Sinpathy, instead of having Reshbal regenerated, which he used to break Keito's seal. He reveals that the whole point of the Glittering Crux is to acquire Sinpathy so that he can use its power to apprivoise Samekh, release the seals and travel through time to relive his memories. That plan ultimately failed when Takuto destroyed Sinpathy while saving Wako.
Ryousuke Katashiro (カタシロ・リョウスケ, Katashiro Ryōsuke) / Chairman (議長, gichou)
Voiced by: Shinichiro Miki
A member of Glittering Crux's second section Vanishing Age squad. Head's mark was originally his until he decided to give it to him. He was Sora's fiance, but he gouged out his left eye when he found that Head was having an affair with her. Despite his cold attitude, Ryousuke really did love Sora, and has been shown to be fond of her son Takuto as well as Sugata and Wako.
Keito Nichi (ニチ・ケイト, Nichi Keito) / Ivrogne (イヴローニュ, Ivurōnyu)
Voiced by: Ami Koshimizu
Class Rep in Takuto's class who sits in front of him. She is also known as Ivrogne, the leader of the Glittering Star's third section, the "Bougainvilleae" Squad. She is the East Maiden unbeknownst to everyone in the Glittering Star Crusade except apparently for Head and Camel Star, who keeps it a secret to himself so that the final two seals can be broken simultaneously, thus preventing pilots from being trapped in Zero Time. In her childhood she was friends with Sugata Shindō and Wako Agemaki, and like Wako she was inspired to become a singer. She gives up on her dream apparently due to being a maiden but still sings privately at the karaoke bar she works at. She seemingly harbors feelings towards Sugata, whose room serves as the location where she performs rituals as a maiden. After confronting Sugata about her position as the East Maiden and he joins the Glittering Crux as King, she apprivoises and has Head break her seal unleashing the fourth phase and releasing Samekh. At the end, she said to Wako that at the end, Sugata still belongs to her after all as she realizes that Wako understood Sugata much more than she did.
Kanako Watanabe (ワタナベ・カナコ, Watanabe Kanako) / President (頭取, Tōdori)
Voiced by: Ayano Niina
Green haired student that sits behind Takuto. She is married to 65-year-old business tycoon Leon Watanabe and lives in her own luxury cruise ship docked at the island. Despite being married, she is always prone to flirt with other men. She is also a member of the Glittering Star known as "The President" and leader of the fourth section also known as the "Adult Bank" squad. Her Cybody is named Betreida. She is also a skilled boxer, able to knockdown large, muscular men with a couple of punches. While she seems to be a very bored wife that enjoys very simple things in life, she is very intelligent and makes her plans far in advanced. In that regard, she has her luxury cruise ship docked for the sole purpose of evacuating the islanders when all of the seals break as the island will begin to erupt in places near the four seals. It has been hinted that she holds feelings for Takuto despite being married. At the end of the anime, she acquires her true mark and helps Takuto.
Simone Aragon (シモーヌ・アラゴン, Shimōnu Aragon) / Secretary (セクレタリー, Sekuretarī)
Voiced by: Ayana Taketatsu
Working as Kanako's assistant, she also is part of the Order's "Adult Bank" squad. She appears to have feelings for Takashi. Simone is also a Cybody pilot, her Cybody being named Daletos. Her real name is Pamela Watanabe (ワタナベ・パメラ, Watanabe Pamera), Leon Watanabe's daughter and thus Kanako's stepdaughter. After being involved in an accident, Kanako apprivoised to save her life. Not knowing this fact, she works with Kanako to get revenge on her. At the end of the anime, she acquires her true mark and helps Takuto. She is also the first among the Glittering Star members to realize that their Cybodies are calling out to their respective Star Drivers, and also the first to recover her true mark.
Takashi Dai (ダイ・タカシ, Dai Takashi) / Banker (バンカー, Bankā)
Voiced by: Kenji Akabane
Working as one of Kanako's employees, he also is part of the Order's "Adult Bank" squad. His Cybody Tzadikt has armor that resembles a samurai's hakama and kataginu, reflecting his practice of kendo swordsmanship, and fights with the Star Sword "Amethyste", which resembles a Japanese blade. He was defeated by Takuto. Like Takuto, Wako, Sugata and Head, he also bears a true mark which allows him to directly control a Cybody without a Cybercasket which he uses to fight once again with Simone's Daletos. He later transfers into Head's "Vanishing Age" after the release of the West Maiden's seal, since only Star Drivers with true marks can apprivoise now that the Crux has reached the Third Phase, despite his Cybody still being destroyed. He later requests to return to Adult Bank – a request which Kanako accepts. At the end of the anime, he helps Takuto when the other members of the Glittering Crux acquire their true marks.
Benio Shinada (シナダ・ベニオ, Shinada Benio) / Scarlet Kiss (スカーレットキス, Sukārettokisu)
Voiced by: Chiemi Chiba
Benio is the Resident Advisor of the school's dorms. She is also a member of the Glittering Crux known as Scarlet Kiss, leader of the fifth section also known as the "Filament" squad. Her First Phase ability is to control any man after kissing him, however it is hinted that she has lost this ability after being defeated in battle. Her Cybody is named Peshent and wields the Star Sword "Rubis". Captain of the Kendo club, she's had feelings for Sugata ever since he defeated her in a match when they were little. She's very quick to anger, prone to mischief, and states that she admires strong individuals as they have the power to change things. Her family's ancestry traditionally bore the true Pe mark, but apparently lost it somewhere down the generations. It may be noteworthy that she is the only member of the Crux possessing a Star Sword while neither having a true mark nor is affiliated with Vanishing Age. She does acquire her true mark at the end of the anime using it to help Takuto.
Joji Honda (ホンダ・ジョージ, Honda Jōji) / Raging Bull (レイジングブル, Reijinguburu)
Voiced by: Shun Takagi
Joji Honda is a member of the school's boxing club. Honda is also a member of the Glittering Star's "Filament" Squad. He goes by the name Raging Bull and his Cybody, Alephist, resembles a bull. He was the first opponent to face and be defeated by Takuto's Tauburn. At the end of the anime, he acquires his true mark and helps Takuto.
Tetsuya Gōda (ゴウダ・テツヤ, Gōda Tetsuya) / Speed Kid (スピードキッド, Supīdokiddo)
Voiced by: Ōki Sugiyama
Another member of the "Filament" squad. His Cybody, Tetrioht, specializes in speed and transforms into a motorcycle. He was the second opponent to be defeated by Takuto. At the end of the anime, he acquires his true mark and helps Takuto.
Midori Okamoto (オカモト・ミドリ, Okamoto Midori) / Professor Green (プロフェッサー・グリーン, Purofessā Gurīn)
Voiced by: Houko Kuwashima
The leader of Glittering Star's Science Guild, known as Professor Green to her subordinates. She is the school nurse. She has an obsession with pretty boys, going as far as to collect candid photos of several male students in albums. Her First Phase ability allows her to reverse her physical age and appear as she was back in high school, an ability she uses to flirt with and manipulate the male students. Her Cybody, Yoddock, has the ability to predict the moves of her opponent. She was defeated by Takuto's Tauburn. At the end of the anime, she acquires her true mark and helps Takuto.
Hideki Shibuya (シブヤ・ヒデキ, Shibuya Hideki) / Professor Silver (プロフェッサー・シルバー, Purofessā Shirubar)
Voiced by: Nobuo Tobita
Second in command of the Crux's Science Guild. He is also part of the school's college research section.
Mami Yano (ヤノ・マミ, Yano Mami) / Ondine (オンディーヌ, Ondīnu)
Voiced by: Chiwa Saito
A member of the Bougainvilleae squad, known as Ondine. A brown-haired girl who views the relationship between Takuto and Wako as dirty. She, like Wako, Takuto, and Sugata, possesses a true mark, Kaph. Her First Phase allows her to summon a human-sized fighting doll called Mermaidoll, which is hard to destroy and can multiply, making her one of the first few opponents to actually cause trouble for Takuto outside of Zero Time. Her Cybody's name is Kaphrat. Despite possessing a mark, for reasons unknown she did not join the Vanishing Age during the third phase.
Marino Yō (ヨウ・マリノ, Yō Marino) / Manticore (マンティコール, Mantikōru)
Voiced by: Ryō Hirohashi
The twin sister of the Western Maiden. She is a school sports star. When Head takes a leave from the organization, Marino, under the name Manticore, is promoted to head of Vanishing Age. She is devoted to keeping secret the fact that her sister Mizuno is the West Maiden, thus her reasoning for joining the Glittering Crux. The Yō sisters grew up without parents as their father left them and her mother followed him off the island, leaving Marino and Mizuno alone. Because of the abandonment, Marino has always resented her father. She apparently has feelings for Takuto like her sister. She is the driver of Ayingott, whose abilities allow Marino to see all of the Maidens. However, Ayingott is a Cybody which consumes its driver, something that Sugata and Wako somehow knew. Upon looking for the Maidens, she finds that she does not appear in any memories involving her sister. Later it is revealed that Marino is actually a clone created by Mizuno's powers out of her despair from being abandoned. After Mizuno's seal is broken, she leaves the island with her.
Tsukihiko Bou (ボウ・ツキヒコ, Bou Tsukihiko) / Stick Star (スティックスター, Suteikusuta)
Voiced by: Kenichi Suzumura
A member of Glittering Crux's second section Vanishing Age squad. His Cybody is named Lamdth and possesses the Star Sword "Sardonyx" which can be used in conjunction with a staff like weapon to form a spear.
Takeo Takumi (タクミ・タケオ, Takumi Takeo) / Sword Star (ソードスター, Sodosuta)
Voiced by: Yuki Kaji
A member of Glittering Crux's second section Vanishing Age squad. His Cybody is named Zayinth and possesses the Star Sword "Grenat" along with projectile weapons known as Zayinth Sphere. His first phase ability is the manipulation of trajectories of objects, which he uses to cheat during a class baseball game. He was attracted to Marino Yō even before he learned she was Manticore.
Ginta Ryo (リョウ・ギンタ, Ryo Ginta) / Camel Star (キャメルスター, Kiyamerusuta)
Voiced by: Ryohei Kimura
A member of Glittering Crux's second section Vanishing Age squad. His Cybody is named Gimlok and possesses the Star Sword "Corail". His first phase ability is to possess animals, like a raven to spy on people or a snake to attack others.
Madoka Kei (ケイ・マドカ, Kei Madoka) / Window Star (ウィンドウスター, Uindosuta)
Voiced by: Yukana
A former member of Adult Bank, she turns to Vanishing Age after Glittering Crux reaches the third phase. Her Cybody is named Hegent and possesses the Star Sword "Perle" along with the ability to manifest illusions in Zero Time. She identifies herself as a Ginga Bishonen despite being female. She is the first member of the Glittering Crux to use the new Overphase machinery. She is in a lesbian relationship with Kou. After being defeated by Tauburn a second time and her real identity revealed, she and Kou decide to leave the island.
Kou Atari (アタリ・コウ, Atari Kou) / Needle Star (ニードルスター, nidorusuta)
Voiced by: Mitsuki Saiga
A former member of Adult Bank, she also joins Vanishing Age after Glittering Crux reaches the third phase. Her Cybody is named Qophlite and she possesses the Star Sword "Opale." Her First Phase is "Eye of the Needle," which allows her and others with her to take control of other people's bodies. Like Madoka, she identifies herself as a Ginga Bishōnen. She is in a lesbian relationship with Madoka. She leaves the island with Madoka, after Madoka is defeated by Tauburn a second time.

== Other characters ==
Sarina Endō (エンドウ・サリナ, Endō Sarina)
Voiced by: Maaya Sakamoto
A third-year and president of Midnight Flight, the school drama club. Just like the other members of the club she is aware of the Crux's plans and supports Takuto and the maidens. She loves acting and shows great concern for her fellow club members. During the Midnight Flight's play, she ad-libs to Takuto that she may not be human, but part of a different race known as the Entropeople, along with the club's vice president, that is connected to the Cybodies origins--seeing as this speech was in a fictional setting, its probity could be in question (though it is certainly corroborated by her ability to distinguish Reiji's true age). Reiji takes interest in her after watching Midnight Flight's play, as she was the one who wrote the play and the plot seemed to have something to do with Cybodies.
Tiger Sugatame (スガタメ・タイガー, Sugatame Taigā)
Voiced by: Nao Tōyama
Tiger is a first-year student at Southern Cross High School. She works as a personal maid for Sugata and secretly has a crush on him. She is skilled in martial arts and knows about the Glittering Crux. She's shown to be friendly and sweet, but a little timid. Keito Nichi used a scent in the Science lab to spark Tiger's memory of her and Sugata reading a story book together, stirring conflicting emotions of her affection for Sugata and her duty to honor his traditional betrothal to Wako. This causes her to fall into a hypnotic sleep, and the Crux uses her memories along with the Cybody Hegent's power of illusion to create a fake, lifeless copy of the island in Zero Time, trapping Wako and Takuto inside. However, she was unable to control and fight with Heigent, and the Glittering Crux removes her from the Cybercasket when Takuto manages to apprivoise inside the illusion, knowing that she could not win against him. Both she and Jaguar's main mission is to keep watch on Sugata and kill him in case he tries to flee the island or claim ownership of Samekh, but even after they learn that he joined the Glittering Crux, they could not bear to do it.
Jaguar Yamasugata (ヤマスガタ・ジャガー, Yamasugata Jagā)
Voiced by: Hiroko Ushida
Jaguar is a second-year at Southern Cross High School, and, like Tiger, serves as a maid for Sugata and is also quite skilled in martial arts. In contrast to Tiger though, she is much more serious and easier to irk. Both she and Tiger's main mission is to keep watch on Sugata and kill him in case he tries to flee the island or claim ownership of Samekh, but even after they learn that he joined the Glittering Crux, they could not bear to do it.
"Fish Girl" (サカナちゃん, Sakana-chan)
Voiced by: Haruka Tomatsu
The island's "North Maiden" (気多の巫女, Kita no Miko). Nicknamed "Fish Girl" by Head, she is locked in a cage at his room since her seal was broken, allowing the order to take control of most of the island's Cybodies. It is there that she sings the main fighting song for Star Driver, Monochrome. Throughout the episodes, she also tells the story of Sam the Squid-Piercer. In episode 7, after completing the story of Sam the Squid-Piercer, Reiji releases her from her bird cage, and she is allowed to leave the island due to her maiden seal having been broken. Reiji has stated that it hurts his heart to let her go, while she also stated that she loves Reiji. It is unknown how she fell into the Crux's hands in the first place, allowing them to break her seal although it has been hinted that she did it willingly. In the credits of the movie, she is credited with her real name, Hyou Matsuri.
Mizuno Yō (ヨウ・ミズノ, Yō Mizuno)
Voiced by: Rina Hidaka
The West Maiden and a first year along with her twin sister. She is not a popular student at Southern Cross High like her sister, but is still well known due to her eccentricities. She allegedly has the ability to talk to birds and utilize "magic". She has a strong crush on Takuto but later realizes that he doesn't feel the same way as her. In an attempt to leave the island, she finds that she is physically unable to, due to her position as a Maiden, with some force causing her day to literally reset to that morning upon reaching a certain distance from the island. It's revealed that Mizuno is actually an only child and when her mother left, she used her powers to create a clone named Marino and fabricated both of their memories to make it seem that they had always been sisters. After her seal is broken, she leaves the island with Marino in search for her mother. Her Maiden Cybody is called Memna.
Ikurou Tsunashi
Voiced by: Hidekatsu Shibata
Takuto's grandfather (and Tokio/Reiji Miyabi's father) and the previous bearer of the Tau mark.
Sora
Voiced by: Fumiko Orikasa
Takuto's mother and Ryousuke's former fiancee. She fell in love with Reiji after realizing that she won't obtain love from Ryousuke (in fact, that was far from the truth as Ryousuke loved her deeply) and had an illicit affair with him but eventually left the island when Ryousuke forced her to realize Reiji's true nature. Before Takuto was born, Sora left the island, and left Takuto with his grandfather Ikurou.
Hana Okada (オカダ・ハナ)
Voiced by: Umika Kawashima (9nine)
Takuto's close middle school friend. Takuto liked her, but she loved Natsuo. Hana visited the island in episode 22.
Fujino Yō (ヨウ・フジノ, Yō Fujino)
Voiced by: Hidaka Noriko
Mizuno's mother who abandoned her as a child.

== Terminology ==
=== Apprivoise and Cybodies ===
Apprivoise (from the French verb "apprivoiser", which means "to tame") is the term that is used to describe the process by which a Cybody is summoned into active battle. An apprivoisement can occur in one of several ways. In the case of Glittering Crux members lacking a true mark, a member must possess a mask and a Star Driver emblem, using the mask in conjunction with the Cybercasket, a giant machine that serves as a piloting chamber. The Maiden's Seals prevent them from summoning their Cybodies outside of Zero Time; the Third Phase, achieved by breaking two Maiden seals, further prevents them from doing so inside of Zero Time, rendering them unable to pilot at all.

Undine, Wako, Takuto, Sugata, Reiji and most of his Vanishing Age comrades have the ability to summon Cybodies via their true marks on their chests. It is unknown if Maidens still possess their ability to summon Maiden Cybodies, or if they are unable to after their seals are broken. Maidens can apprivoise their own Cybodies, as shown by Keito and Wako on episodes 24 and 25 respectively, during the process of their seals being broken. However, it can be assumed that even after a Maiden's seal is broken, she still possesses powers. This has been shown by Mizuno in episode 16 when even after Memma was destroyed and Mizuno's seal was broken, Marino, a clone created by Mizuno's powers, is revealed to be still alive.

Cybodies are split into three categories, Four Cybodies of the Maiden Type that belong to Wako and the other maidens and prevent Cybodies from being used outside of Zero Time, the single King Cybody in possession of Sugata, so powerful that no pilot ever managed to use it in combat. Ayingott is also a King Cybody, and is the Cybody that battled Samekh in the past. Although it was defeated and weakened, then broken into many pieces. This explains why Ayingott was the only Cybody found destroyed when dug up on Southern Cross Island. The remaining Cybodies belong to the Warrior Type. Glittering Crux's main objective is to destroy the Four Maiden Cybodies to allow them to use theirs in the outside world. It is hinted that a maiden has her seal broken if her Cybody is destroyed or if she loses her virginity before passing her mark to her successor (hence, "Maiden"). It is also hinted that Cybodies have more uses than simply fighting as it was mentioned that Kanako apprivoised to save Simone. Also, it seems that the higher the phase of a Cybody the stronger it is, implying that it is a form of evolution for the Cybody. It has been implied that Cybodies have consciousness, as shown when Ayingott fell into a berserk state while being piloted.

Cybodies seem to be bound from accessing higher phases due to the Maiden Cybodies' seals. Usually, the pilots have access to a special power known as the first phase, that can be used even without a Cybody. To unlock the second phase, one of the seals must be broken, two for the third phase and so on, despite it is unknown why Takuto managed to bring his Tauburn to the third phase before the second seal was broken. A Cybody can only be piloted from second phase onwards, and only those bearing true marks can use Cybodies from third phase onwards. The third phase unlocks special abilities for the Cybodies and the fourth phase further increases their abilities but apparently would cause the pilots and Cybodies to become trapped within Zero Time, thus requiring the final two seals to be broken simultaneously. In addition, once the fourth phase is unlocked, Samekh is unsealed. If the fifth phase is unlocked, then Zero Time breaks which also unleashes Samekh onto the world, which will absorb all of the libido in the world causing the end of the world though its user can use its power to its fullest extent such as traveling through time.

There has not been shown to be a clear system for attaining marks, though a possible connection is that each person with a real mark has been "beautiful", leading the individual to be known as a Galactic Pretty Boy (regardless of their gender). Another point of interest is that only Cybodies who have a Driver with a true mark or a connection to the mark has a Star Sword. Further, each non-Maiden Star Driver who bears a true mark has been shown to be extremely talented at something, such as Tadashi's skill at piano and kendo and Head's art. In addition, all of the four maidens each have a talent for singing. Also, Drivers without true marks lose their first phase abilities after their Cybodies are destroyed. In addition, marks can be willingly passed to others, even if they don't have a mark or the same bloodline. Though with the case of all of the Star Drivers, even if they don't have a mark themselves, if their ancestors had a mark, they can apprivoise and can acquire a mark themselves.

In total, there are twenty-two Cybodies. Each Cybody's name is named after a letter in the Phoenician alphabet, which multiple modern Semitic abjads are derived from, notably Hebrew, Aramaic and Arabic. Each Star Driver's mark is also derived from the matching letters. Some Cybodies also have the ability to summon one or two special blades called "Star Swords", each one named after a different gem's name in French. There are twelve in total although one remains unseen in the anime series. All Cybodies are capable of flight similar to levitation.

According to Sarina, Tauburn is different from other Cybodies as it was created specifically for earthlings, what could explain Takuto's prowess to pilot it.

=== List of Drivers and Cybodies ===
Letter	Driver name	Cybody	Symbol	Star Sword	First Phase Ability; Cybody Powers	Class
Aleph	Joji	Alephist	Aleph	-	None; Super strength/Extensible horns called the Buffalo Crash	Warrior
Bet	Kanako	Betraida	Beth	-	Human regeneration; Reinforced Claws	Warrior
Gimel	Ginta	Gimelock	Gimel	Corail (Coral)	Animal possession; Star Sword Corail (Zhanmadao-like)/Four-armed detachable cape called Needle Star/Energy field	Warrior
Dalet	Simone	Daletos	Daleth	-	Barriers; Cybody powers of any Star Driver piloting the second cockpit	Warrior
He	Madoka	Heigent	He	Perle (Pearl)	Summoning a shadow dimension called the Miroir; Memory based environments/Star Sword Perle (broadsword-like)/Limb lasers	Warrior
Waw	Wako	Wauna	Waw	-	Smell; Maintaining Southern Seal	Maiden
Zayin	Takeo	Zayinas	Zayin	Grenat (Garnet)	Swordsman skills; Star Sword Grenat (joust lance-like)/Four red energy balls called the Zayinsphere	Warrior
Heth	Keito	Hethna	Heth	-	Life force transplanting capable of revival called the Pledge of Eternity; Seal of Samekh called the Obito/Maintaining Eastern Seal	Maiden
Teth	Tetsuya	Tetrioht	Teth	-	None; Super speed/Energy saw discs	Warrior
Yodh	Midori	Yoddock	Yodh	-	Temporary time rejuvenation; Arm Bomber/Seeing seconds into the future	Warrior
Kaph	Mami	Kaphrat	Kaph	-	An energy composed android called the Mermaidoll; Transforming into a fish or double sided blade	Warrior
Lamedh	Tsukihiko	Lamedhos	Lamedh	Sardonyx (Onyx)	Swordsman skills; Star Sword Sardonyx (claymore-like)/Star Sword attaching spear	Warrior
Mem	Mizuno	Memna	Mem	-	Clone generation (Marino); Maintaining Western Seal	Maiden
Nun	Sakana-chan	Nunna	Nun	-	Keeps all Cybodies from unlocking; Maintaining Northern Seal	Maiden
Samekh	Sugata	Samekh	Samekh		An extremely powerful energy pillar called the King's Pillar; Reviving and controlling Cybodies/Body lightning/Libido absorption/Eight homing laser cannons/Fifth phase ability: Time Travel	King
Ayin	Marino	Ayingott	Ayin	-	None; Shoulder eyes that can detect Shrine Maidens called the Ayingott's Eyes/Possessive black slime from the body	Warrior
Pe	Benio	Pageant	Pe	Rubis (Ruby)	Control over kissed men/ Libido absorption/Swordsman skills/Super speed; Star Sword Rubis (wakizashi-like)	Warrior
Tsade	Takashi	Tzadikt	Sadek	Améthyste (Amethyst)	Swordsman skills; Star Sword Amethyst (katana-like)/Rapid slash attack called the Divine Snowstorm	Warrior
Qoph	Ko	Qophlite	Qoph	Opale (Opal)	Possessive eye lasers called the Eye of the Needle that control others/X-ray vision; Star Sword Opale (longsword-like)/Fighter transformation armed with a machine gun	Warrior
Resh	Ryousuke / Reiji	Reshbal	Res	Diamant (Diamond)	Eye of Truth; Star Sword Diament/Four funnels/Libido absorption	Warrior
Sin	Shingo / Reiji	Sinpathy	Sin	Turquoise	Preventing the driver of other apprivoised Cybodies from aging physically; Star Sword Turqoise (zweihander-like) and later Diamant/apprivoise other Cybodies using energy spears	Warrior
Taw	Takuto	Tauburn	Taw	Emeraude (Emerald) and Saphir (Sapphire)	Higher than normal radiance; Star Swords Emerald and Sapphire (rapier-like)/Tau Galaxy Beam/Four funnels/Tau Missile/Dynamic Galactic Cross-Slash	Warrior
