= Yū Shimamura =

Japanese voice actress

- 嶋村 侑
- Born: Tokyo, Japan
- Occupation: Voice actress
- Years active: 2005–present
- Agent: Ken Production
- Notable work: Attack on Titan as Annie Leonhardt; Bungō Stray Dogs as Akiko Yosano; Go! Princess PreCure as Haruka Haruno/Cure Flora; The Legend of Zelda as Princess Zelda and Sheik; Zenless Zone Zero as Jane Doe; Blue Archive as Chise Waraku

Yū Shimamura (嶋村 侑, Shimamura Yū) is a Japanese voice actress. She was formerly affiliated with Office Kaoru and is now affiliated with Ken Production.

== Filmography ==
=== Anime series ===
Year	Title	Role	Notes	Source
2007	Code-E	Oda		
2007	Kanon	Student		
2008	Noramimi	Shigeru's Friends		
2008	Our Home's Fox Deity	Tōru Takagami		
2008	Tales of the Abyss	Mary		
2009	Bleach	Sōgyo no Kotowari, Kōga's wife, Katen Kyōkotsu (Wakizashi)		
2009	Chi's New Address	Alice		
2009	Needless	Kurumi		
2009	Queen's Blade: The Exiled Virgin	Knight		
2009	A Certain Scientific Railgun	Female student		
2010	Jewelpet Twinkle☆	Fealina		
2010	Katanagatari	Brain Truster		
2010	Hime Chen! Otogi Chikku Idol Lilpri	Yūka, Ran, Suiyō Yukimori, Mushroom Sister, Asuka, Tanaka		
2010	Omamori Himari	Committee Chairperson		
2011	[C]: Control - The Money of Soul and Possibility	Emcee		
2011	Chihayafuru	Reiko Mashima		
2011	Guilty Crown	Hare Menjō		
2011	Maken-ki!	Garrett Kinua		
2011	Mobile Suit Gundam AGE	Millais Alloy		
2012	Another	Kazue Satō		
2012	Lupin the Third: The Woman Called Fujiko Mine	Kaleidoscope Girl		
2012	Mysterious Girlfriend X	Aika Hayakawa		
2012	Sengoku Collection	Sarah		
2013	Chihayafuru 2	Reiko Mashima		
2013	Little Battlers Experience Wars	Reina Mito		
2013	Tanken Driland: Sennen no Mahō	Feylin		
2013	Kuroko's Basketball	Masako Araki		
2013	Attack on Titan	Annie Leonhart		
2014	Gundam Reconguista in G	Aida Surugan		
2014	Aldnoah.Zero	Kaoru Mizusaki		
2014	Sword Art Online II	Siune		
2015	Aldnoah.Zero 2	Kaoru Mizusaki		
2015	Attack on Titan: Junior High	Annie Leonhart		
2015	Gangsta	Erica		
2015	Go! Princess PreCure	Haruka Haruno/Cure Flora		
2015	Seraph of the End	Mito Jujo, young Yūichiro		
2015	The Testament of Sister New Devil Burst	Rikka Kajiura		
2016	Bungō Stray Dogs	Akiko Yosano		
2016	JoJo's Bizarre Adventure: Diamond Is Unbreakable	Shinobu Kawajiri		
2017	Digimon Universe: Appli Monsters	Offmon	She also voice acts a minor character, Mariko	
2017	18if	Mana Hayashida		
2018	Boarding School Juliet	Chartreux Westia		
2018	Kira Kira Happy ★ Hirake! Cocotama	Ruby		
2018	Hugtto! PreCure	Haruka Haruno/Cure Flora	Episode 37	
2018	Overlord II	Tuareninya Veyron		
2019	Midnight Occult Civil Servants	Adiel, Akane Kanoichi		
2019	Given	Yayoi Uenoyama		
2020	Monster Girl Doctor	Aranya Trantella Alakunida		
2020	The Day I Became a God	Kako Tengan		
2021	Bungo Stray Dogs Wan!	Akiko Yosano		
2021	Farewell, My Dear Cramer	Eriko Tase		
2021	Seven Knights Revolution: Hero Successor	Yunomia		
2021	Digimon Ghost Game	Jellymon	She also voice acts the rest of Jellymon's evolution form	
2022	RWBY: Ice Queendom	Blake Belladonna		
2022	Mob Psycho 100 III	Ichi Mezato	Replacing Ayumi Fujimura	
2023	The Fire Hunter	Kiri		
2023	Tōsōchū: The Great Mission	Harvest		
2023	Ragna Crimson	Nazarena Teluzian		
2024	Metallic Rouge	Sara Fitzgerald		
2024	Tower of God 2nd Season	Kana / Yeo Goseng		
2024	Mecha-Ude	Aki		
2024	Pokémon Horizons: The Series	Briar		
2025	#Compass 2.0: Combat Providence Analysis System	Maria		
2025	Umamusume: Cinderella Gray	Fumino Nase		
2026	Hell Teacher: Jigoku Sensei Nube	Minako		
2026	Daemons of the Shadow Realm	Natsuki Kuroya		

=== Original video animation (OVA) ===
Year	Title	Role	Notes	Source
2012	Otome wa Boku ni Koishiteru	Chihaya Kisakinomiya		
2014	Attack on Titan	Annie Leonhart		
2016	The Kubikiri Cycle	Akane Sonoyama		
2017	Bungou Stray Dogs: Hitori Ayumu	Akiko Yosano		
2017	Attack on Titan: Lost Girls 'Wall Sina, Goodbye: Part One'	Annie Leonhart		
2018	Attack on Titan: Lost Girls 'Wall Sina, Goodbye: Part Two'	Annie Leonhart		

=== Anime films ===
Year	Title	Role	Notes	Source
2011	The Princess and the Pilot	Noel		
2012	Blood-C: The Last Dark	Female student		
2015	Pretty Cure All Stars: Spring Carnival	Haruka Haruno/Cure Flora		
2015	Go! Princess Pretty Cure the Movie: Go! Go!! Gorgeous Triple Feature!!!	Haruka Haruno/Cure Flora		
2016	Pretty Cure All Stars: Singing with Everyone Miraculous Magic!	Haruka Haruno/Cure Flora		
2017	Pretty Cure Dream Stars!	Haruka Haruno/Cure Flora		
2018	Hug! Pretty Cure Futari wa Pretty Cure: All Stars Memories	Haruka Haruno/Cure Flora		
2018	Bungo Stray Dogs: Dead Apple	Akiko Yosano		
2019	Gundam Reconguista in G I: Go! Core Fighter	Aida Surugan		
2019	Pretty Cure Miracle Universe	Haruka Haruno/Cure Flora		
2020	Gundam Reconguista in G II: Bellri's Fierce Charge	Aida Surugan		
2020	The Stranger by the Shore	Sakurako		
2020	Wave!!	Yoko		
2021	Eureka - Eureka Seven: Hi-Evolution	Matsuno La Dino		
2023	Pretty Cure All Stars F	Haruka Haruno/Cure Flora		

=== Web anime ===
- The Wings of Rean (2005) – Luxe Houjou
- The King of Fighters: Destiny (2017–2018) – Mature
- Sword Gai (2018) – Mina Haraya
- 7 Seeds (2019) – Ayu
- Hero Mask (2019) – Tina Hurst

=== Video games ===
- The Legend of Zelda: Skyward Sword (2011) – Princess Zelda
- Toushin Toshi Girls Gift RPG (2014) – Serena
- Tokyo Xanadu (2015) – Asuka Hiiragi
- Assassin's Creed Syndicate (2015) – Evie Frye
- Final Fantasy XV (2016) – Cindy Aurum
- The Legend of Zelda: Breath of the Wild (2017) – Princess Zelda
- Fate/Grand Order (2017) – Berserker of El Dorado/Penthesilea
- BlazBlue: Cross Tag Battle (2018) – Blake Belladonna
- The King of Fighters All Star (2018) – Mature
- Azur Lane (2018) – Minneapolis
- Devil May Cry 5 (2019) – Patty Lowell
- The Alchemist Code (2019) – Ambrosia
- Hyrule Warriors: Age of Calamity (2020) – Princess Zelda
- The Last of Us Part II (2020) – Dina
- Blue Archive (2021) – Waraku Chise
- Bravely Default II (2021) – Gloria
- The Legend of Zelda: Tears of the Kingdom (2023) – Princess Zelda
- Zenless Zone Zero (2024) – Jane Doe
- The King of Fighters XV (2024) – Mature
- Hyrule Warriors: Age of Imprisonment (2025) – Princess Zelda
- The Legend of Zelda: Ocarina of Time (2026) – Princess Zelda / Sheik

=== Dubbing roles ===
==== Live-action ====
Title	Role	Dubbing actor	Notes	Source
100 Things to Do Before High School	Mindy Minus	Brady Reiter		
Action Point	Boogie	Eleanor Worthington Cox		
Barfi!	Shruti Ghosh	Ileana D'Cruz		
Deadpool	Negasonic Teenage Warhead	Brianna Hildebrand		
Deadpool 2	Negasonic Teenage Warhead	Brianna Hildebrand		
Deadpool & Wolverine	Negasonic Teenage Warhead	Brianna Hildebrand		
The Deuce	Lori Madison	Emily Meade		
Diary of the Dead	Tracy Thurman	Amy Lalonde		
The Diary of a Teenage Girl	Kimmie Minter	Madeleine Waters		
The Exorcist	Verity	Brianna Hildebrand		
Hairspray	Penny Lou Pingleton	Amanda Bynes		
Jurassic World: Fallen Kingdom	Zia Rodriguez	Daniella Pineda	2025 The Cinema edition	
Legacies	Hope Mikaelson	Danielle Rose Russell		
Lincoln Rhyme: Hunt for the Bone Collector	Kate	Brooke Lyons		
M3GAN	M3GAN	Jenna Davis		
Mary Queen of Scots	Mary, Queen of Scots	Saoirse Ronan		
Minari	Monica Yi	Han Ye-ri		
Moon	Eve Bell	Kaya Scodelario		
Mortal Engines	Katherine Valentine	Leila George		
Nick & Norah's Infinite Playlist	Tris	Alexis Dziena		
The Nun	Sister Victoria	Charlotte Hope		
Pitch Perfect	Chloe Beale	Brittany Snow		
Pitch Perfect 2	Chloe Beale	Brittany Snow		
Pretty Little Liars	Hanna Marin	Ashley Benson		
The Purge	Zoey Sandin	Adelaide Kane		
Somewhere	Cleo	Elle Fanning		
Suspiria	Susie Bannion	Dakota Johnson		
The Taking of Tiger Mountain	Bai Ru	Tong Liya		
Unsane	Violet	Juno Temple		
Up in the Air	Natalie Keener	Anna Kendrick		

==== Animation ====
Title	Role	Notes	Source
Monster Hunter: Legends of the Guild	Mae		
Tad the Lost Explorer and the Secret of King Midas	Sara Lavrof		
Code Lyoko	Aelita Schaeffer		
My Little Pony: Equestria Girls – Rainbow Rocks	Adagio Dazzle		
RWBY	Blake Belladonna		
