= Ami Koshimizu =

Japanese voice actress

- 小清水 亜美
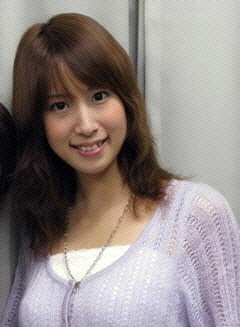
- Koshimizu in November 2008
- Born: February 15, 1986 (age 40); Kokubunji, Tokyo, Japan
- Other names: Amisuke (あみすけ); Amikke (あみっけ); Amiko (あみこ)
- Education: Aomori Yamada High School
- Occupations: Actress; voice actress; singer
- Years active: 2003–present
- Agent: Office Restart
- Notable work: Code Geass as Kallen Stadtfeld; Spice and Wolf as Holo; Persona 4 as Yukiko Amagi; Umineko When They Cry as Rosa Ushiromiya; Kill la Kill as Ryuko Matoi; Tales of Berseria as Eleanor Hume
- Height: 169 cm (5 ft 7 in)
- Musical career
- Genres: J-pop; Anison
- Instrument: Vocals
- Label: Columbia

Ami Koshimizu (小清水 亜美, Koshimizu Ami; born February 15, 1986) is a Japanese actress and singer. She has voiced many different types of characters, from young girls to adult women, as well as boys and animals.

Her roles include leads such as Ryuko Matoi in Kill la Kill, Charlotte E. Yeager in Strike Witches series, Kallen Stadtfeld in Code Geass, Anemone in Eureka Seven, Irina Tachibana in Rio: Rainbow Gate, Nadja Applefield in Ashita no Nadja, Leonmitchelli Galette Des Rois in Dog Days, Shizuri Mugino in A Certain Scientific Railgun series, Yumi Hoshino in KimiKiss: Pure Rouge, Takuto Hasegawa in Magician's Academy, Hibiki Hojo in Suite PreCure, Nanaka Yatsushiro in Myself ; Yourself, Ersha in Cross Ange, Himari Noihara in Omamori Himari, Sailor Jupiter in Sailor Moon Crystal, Mikumo Guynemer in Macross Delta, Nodoka Haramura in Saki, Tenma Tsukamoto in School Rumble, Holo in Spice and Wolf, Ibuki Mioda from the Danganronpa series, and Yang Xiao Long in both RWBY (Japanese dub) and RWBY: Ice Queendom.

In video games, she voiced notable characters like Agnès Oblige in Bravely Default, Mai Shiranui since KOF Sky Stage, Mist in Rune Factory, Rimurisu in Tears to Tiara, Rinka in the Atelier series, Hoshimi Miyabi in Zenless Zone Zero (Japanese Dub), Tsuruhime in Sengoku Basara, Yukiko Amagi in Persona 4, Captain/Major Claire Rieveldt and Musse Egret in The Legend of Heroes: Trails of Cold Steel series, Beidou (Hokuto in Japanese) in Genshin Impact (Japanese Dub), and Zima and Projekt Red in Arknights. She also is known for her dubbing role for Thailand films which starred Yanin Vismitananda. In addition, she also voiced in the live action anime film Shimajiro and the Rainbow Oasis.

== Career ==
At the age of 12, Koshimizu joined Theater Company Wakakusa. In the second year of junior high school, she was over 160 cm tall and was troubled by the fact that she could not get roles as a child actor. Influenced by her senior in the troupe, Mayumi Iizuka, she began to aspire to become a voice actor. In 2003, she passed an audition for Ashita no Nadja and made her voice acting debut as the lead Nadja Applefield. She continued her career with roles in School Rumble (as Tenma Tsukamoto), Onegai My Melody (as Miki Sakurazuka), and Eureka Seven (as Anemone).

In 2007, she won the 1st Seiyu Awards for Best Actress in a supporting role for her role as Kallen Stadtfeld in Code Geass, and in 2011, she starred in Suite PreCure (Hibiki Hojo/Cure Melody) for the second time since her debut in the 8:30 - 9:00 Sunday slot produced by Asahi Broadcasting Corporation. She also visited Anime Expo as a guest of honor to promote Kill la Kill as Ryuko Matoi.

On September 30, 2011, Koshimizu left Production Baobab, where she had belonged for four years, and joined Axlone on October 1, 2011. On February 28, 2018, she left Axlone and announced that she would be working as a freelancer. On January 7, 2022, she announced that she will be under her own agency, Office Restart.

== Filmography ==
=== Animation ===
List of voice performances in animation
Year	Title	Role	Notes	Source
2003	Ashita no Nadja	Nadja Applefield		
2003	Gunslinger Girl	Claes		
2004	Monochrome Factor	Asamura Mayu		
2004–05	Futari wa Pretty Cure series	Natsuko Koshino	Also Max Heart	
2004–07	Onegai My Melody series	Miki Sakurazuka		
2004	Sweet Valerian	Kanoko		
2004–06	School Rumble series	Tenma Tsukamoto		
2004–05	Futakoi	Sumireko Ichijō	Also Alternative	
2005	Eureka Seven	Anemone		
2005	Immortal Grand Prix	Yuri Jinno		
2005	My-Otome	Nina Wáng		
2006	Lemon Angel Project	Saya Yuuki		
2006	Simoun	Paraietta		
2006	Kamisama Kazoku	Tenko		
2006	Muteki Kanban Musume	Megumi Kannazuki		
2006–08	Code Geass series	Kallen Stadtfeld		
2006	Kujibiki Unbalance	Ritsuko Kübel Kettenkrad		
2007–09	My-Otome Zwei	Nina Wong	OVA	
2007	Keitai Shoujo	Ichiru Mishima	web series	
2007	Aika R-16: Virgin Mission	Aika Sumeragi	OVA series	
2007	Myself ; Yourself	Nanaka Yatsushiro		
2007	KimiKiss: Pure Rouge	Yūmi Hoshino		
2008	H2O: Footprints in the Sand	Takuma Hirose		
2008–09	Spice and Wolf series	Holo		
2008–09	My-Otome 0~S.ifr~	Sifr Fran	OVA	
2008–present	Strike Witches series	Charlotte E. Yeager		
2008	Magician's Academy	Takuto Hasegawa		
2008–present	Case Closed	Yui Uehara		
2009	Maria-sama ga Miteru	Kanako Hosokawa	season 4	
2009	The Girl Who Leapt Through Space	Mintao		
2009	Phantom: Requiem for the Phantom	Mio Fujieda		
2009	Tears to Tiara	Limwris		
2009–14	Saki series	Nodoka Haramura		
2009	GA Geijutsuka Art Design Class	Mizubuchi		
2009	Sora no Manimani	Fumie Kotozuka		
2009	Umineko: When They Cry	Rosa Ushiromiya		
2009	Aika Zero	Aika Sumeragi	OVA series	
2009–10	Tegami Bachi	Aria Link	Also Reverse	
2009	Natsu no Arashi!	Umeyashiki		
2010	Ladies versus Butlers!	Sanae Shikikagami		
2010	Omamori Himari	Himari Noihara		
2010–11	Nura: Rise of the Yokai Clan	Sasami		
2010	Psychic Detective Yakumo	Nao Saito		
2010	Star Driver	Keito Nichi		
2010–13	Hyakka Ryōran series	Charles d'Artagnan		
2011	Rio: Rainbow Gate	Irina Tachibana		
2011	Freezing	Ingrid Bernstein		
2011–12	Suite PreCure	Hibiki Hojo/Cure Melody		
2011–15	Dog Days series	Leonmichelli Galette des Rois		
2011	Gintama	Sayaka Otakai		
2011	The World God Only Knows	Kusunoki Kasuga	season 2	
2011	Nyanpire the Animation	Nyanpire		
2011	The Mystic Archives of Dantalian	Flamberge		
2011–12	Horizon in the Middle of Nowhere series	Tomo Asama		
2011	Persona 4	Yukiko Amagi		
2011	Mobile Suit Gundam AGE	Arisa Gunhale		
2011	Busou Chuugakusei Basket Army 武装中学生	Toko Natori	web series	
2012	Is This a Zombie? Of the dead	Naegleria "Nene" Nebiros		
2012	Medaka Box	Fue Yobuko		
2012	Daily Lives of High School Boys	Yoshitake's older sister		
2012	Jormungand series	Schokolade		
2012	Hyoka	Midori Yamanishi		
2012	Nakaimo - My Sister Is Among Them!	Ikusu Mizutani		
2013	Maoyu	Mao		
2013	Seitokai no Ichizon Lv. 2	Asuka Matsubara		
2013	Devil Survivor 2: The Animation	Hinako Kujou		
2013	Yondemasuyo, Azazel-san	Mayu Hanasaki		
2013	A Certain Scientific Railgun S	Shizuri Mugino		
2013	Kill la Kill	Ryuko Matoi		
2013	Gingitsune	Hiwako Funabashi		
2014	D-Frag!	Minami Osawa	Also theme song	
2014	Love, Chunibyo & Other Delusions	Natsumi Tokugawa (fake Mori Summer)		
2014	Black Bullet	Miori Shiba		
2014	Soul Eater Not!	Shaula		
2014	Atelier Escha & Logy: Alchemists of the Dusk Sky	Rinka		
2014	Ane Log: Moyako Neesan no Tomaranai	Moyako Konoe	OVA series	
2014	Sengoku Basara: End of Judgement	Tsuruhime		
2014–15	Pretty Guardian Sailor Moon Crystal	Makoto Kino / Sailor Jupiter	ONA, Season 1&2 (Dark Kingdom and Black Moon arc)	
2014	Fate/kaleid liner Prisma Illya series	Caren Hortensia	Starting from 2wei	
2014	Persona 4: The Golden Animation	Yukiko Amagi		
2014	Renai Senka -The Special Class of Love-	Yukio Takabayashi	"Manga 2.5" motion-animated comic	
2014	Cross Ange	Ersha		
2015	Yurikuma Arashi	Konomi Yurikawa		
2015	Gangsta.	Constance Raveau		
2015	Himouto! Umaru-chan	Manager Kanau		
2015	Prison School	Kate Takenomiya		
2016	Myriad Colors Phantom World	Ayumi Kitajima		
2016	Divine Gate	Irfit		
2016	Gate: Jieitai Kanochi nite, Kaku Tatakaeri – Enryuu-hen	Tyuule		
2016	Macross Delta	Mikumo Guynemer		
2016	Pretty Guardian Sailor Moon Crystal Season III	Makoto Kino/Sailor Jupiter	TV Anime, Season 3 (Death Busters arc)	
2016	Joker Game	Ellen Price		
2016	Anne Happy	Saginomiya-sensei	Ep. 9	
2016	Rin-ne	Ranko	season 2	
2016	D.Gray-man Hallow	Miranda Lotto		
2016	Danganronpa 3: The End of Hope's Peak High School	Ibuki Mioda	Despair Arc	
2016	Bungo Stray Dogs	Ozaki Kōyō		
2017–24	My Hero Academia	Sirius		
2017–18	The King of Fighters: Destiny	Mai Shiranui, Rock Howard (child)	web series	
2017	Konbini Kareshi	Nozomi Itokawa		
2017	Masamune-kun's Revenge	Midori Yuisaki		
2017	Garo: Vanishing Line	Gina		
2017	Yu-Gi-Oh! VRAINS	Kyoko Taki/Baira		
2017	Sagrada Reset	Sasane Ukawa		
2017	Tomica Hyper Rescue Drive Head Kidō Kyūkyū Keisatsu	Megumi Shinmon		
2018–21	B: The Beginning	Kaela Yoshinaga		
2018	Devilman Crybaby	Miki "Miko" Kuroda		
2018	Darling in the Franxx	Code:703/Naomi, young Hiro		
2018	Overlord II	Lakyus Alvein Dale Aindra		
2018	A Certain Magical Index III	Shizuri Mugino		
2018	Zoids Wild	Sauce, Yokan		
2018	The Girl in Twilight	Nana Nanase		
2018	Inazuma Eleven: Ares	Tanukigahara Ponko		
2019	Wataten!: An Angel Flew Down to Me	Chizuru Hoshino		
2019	Demon Slayer: Kimetsu no Yaiba	Spider Demon (Mother)	Ep.16	
2020	A Certain Scientific Railgun T	Shizuri Mugino		
2020	The Misfit of Demon King Academy	Emilia Ludowell		
2020	Iwa-Kakeru! Sport Climbing Girls	Asuka Fujimura		
2020	Our Last Crusade or the Rise of a New World	Shanorotte Gregory		
2020–22	Princess Connect! Re:Dive	Shiori / Shiori Kashiwazaki		
2020	Diary of Our Days at the Breakwater	Sayaka Kotani		
2021	Back Arrow	Fine Forte		
2021	Girlfriend, Girlfriend	Saki's mom		
2021	Kimi to Fit Boxing	Sophie		
2021	Deep Insanity: The Lost Child	Vera Rustamova		
2022	Girls' Frontline	G36		
2022	Mahjong Soul Pong	Yui Yagi		
2022	Birdie Wing: Golf Girls' Story	Amane Shinjō		
2022	RWBY: Ice Queendom	Yang Xiao Long		
2022	Lycoris Recoil	Mizuki Nakahara		
2022	Management of a Novice Alchemist	Maria		
2022	Reincarnated as a Sword	Amanda		
2023	The Way of the Househusband	Koharu	web series	
2023	The Fruit of Evolution 2	Angurea		
2023	BOFURI: I Don't Want to Get Hurt, so I'll Max Out My Defense	Bell/New Secretary	Season 2	
2023	KamiKatsu	Gaia		
2023	My One-Hit Kill Sister	Kilmaria		
2023	Otaku Elf	Elda		
2023	Am I Actually the Strongest?	Irisphilia		
2023	Level 1 Demon Lord and One Room Hero	Yuria		
2023	The Rising of the Shield Hero	Sadeena	Season 3	
2023	The Apothecary Diaries	Pairin		
2024	Tsukimichi: Moonlit Fantasy	Navarre Polar	Season 2	
2024	Shaman King: Flowers	Luca Asakura		
2024	Cherry Magic! Thirty Years of Virginity Can Make You a Wizard?!	Nozomi Fujisaki		
2024	Shangri-La Frontier	Tsukuyo Tsukuri		
2024	Gods' Games We Play	Miranda		
2024	Spice and Wolf: Merchant Meets the Wise Wolf	Holo		
2024	The Many Sides of Voice Actor Radio	Ringo Kagasaki		
2024	Bye Bye, Earth	Benedictine		
2024	Failure Frame: I Became the Strongest and Annihilated Everything with Low-Level Spells	Vicious		
2024	Mission: Yozakura Family	Akai		
2024	365 Days to the Wedding	Asako Kurokawa		
2025	Medalist	Nozomi Yuitsuka		
2025	Grisaia: Phantom Trigger the Animation	Aoi		
2025	Flower and Asura	Owari Konoyono		
2025	The Daily Life of a Middle-Aged Online Shopper in Another World	Amaranthus		
2025	Miru: Paths to My Future	Big Sis		
2025	Beyblade X	Omega Shiroboshi		
2025	Witch Watch	Honoka Shirafuji		
2025	Cat's Eye	Rui Kisugi	web series	
2025	Dusk Beyond the End of the World	Fldes		
2025	A Wild Last Boss Appeared!	Lufas Maphaahl		
2025	Mechanical Marie	Marie-2		
2025	Umamusume: Cinderella Gray	Glory Garibaldi	Second cour	
2026	Wash It All Away	Asami Yagara		
2026	Reincarnated as a Dragon Hatchling	Divine Voice		
2026	Chained Soldier	Kuusetsu	Season 2	
2026	Roll Over and Die	Neigass		
2026	Snowball Earth	Ao Nogi		
2026	Jaadugar: A Witch in Mongolia	Töregene		
2026	I Became a Legend After My 10 Year-Long Last Stand	Lefy		
2026	Vertex Force	Eleanor Northbrook		
2026	A Certain Dark Item	Shizuri Mugino		
2026	Magical Girl Raising Project: Restart	Akane		
2027	Tune In to the Midnight Heart	Riina Yamabuki	Season 2	

=== Film ===
List of voice performances in feature films
Year	Title	Role	Notes	Source
2009	Hells	Kiki		
2009	Detective Conan: The Raven Chaser	Yui Uehara		
2009	Eureka Seven: Pocketful of Rainbows	Anemone		
2009	Ring of Gundam	Beauty	short film	
2009	The Rebirth of Buddha	Sayoko Amakawa		
2011	Pretty Cure All Stars DX3: Deliver the Future! The Rainbow-Colored Flower That Connects the World	Hibiki Hojo (Cure Melody)		
2011	Suite PreCure The Movie: Take it back! The Miraculous Melody that Connects Hearts!	Hibiki Hojo (Cure Melody)		
2012	Pretty Cure All Stars New Stage: Friends of the Future	Hibiki Hojo (Cure Melody)		
2012	Strike Witches: The Movie	Charlotte E. Yeager		
2012	Shiranpuri しらんぷり	Yaragase		
2013	Star Driver: The Movie	Keito Nichi		
2014	Pretty Cure All Stars New Stage 3: Eternal Friends	Hibiki Hojo (Cure Melody)		
2015	Pretty Cure All Stars: Spring Carnival	Hibiki Hojo (Cure Melody)		
2016	Pretty Cure All Stars: Singing with Everyone! Miraculous Magic!	Hibiki Hojo (Cure Melody)		
2017	Shimajiro and the Rainbow Oasis		Is credited on the Kodomo PDF file Shimajiro and the Rainbow Oasis	
2017–18	Code Geass Lelouch of the Rebellion	Kallen Stadtfeld	3-part compilation film, New dialogues recorded	
2018	Hug! Pretty Cure Futari wa Pretty Cure: All Stars Memories	Hibiki Hojo (Cure Melody)		
2018	Anemone: Eureka Seven Hi-Evolution	Ishi Huka Anemone		
2019	Code Geass Lelouch of the Re;surrection	Kallen Stadtfeld		
2019	Promare	Heris Ardebit		
2021	Pretty Guardian Sailor Moon Eternal The Movie	Makoto Kino / Super Sailor Jupiter	2-Part film Season 4 of Sailor Moon Crystal (Dead Moon arc)	
2023	Pretty Guardian Sailor Moon Cosmos The Movie	Makoto Kino / Eternal Sailor Jupiter	2-Part film Season 5 of Sailor Moon Crystal (Shadow Galactica arc)	
2023	Pretty Cure All Stars F	Hibiki Hojo (Cure Melody)		
2024	Code Geass: Rozé of the Recapture	Kallen Stadtfeld	4-Part film series Cameo	
2025	Detective Conan: One-Eyed Flashback	Yui Uehara		
2026	Patlabor EZY: File 1	Saki Hirata		
2026	Patlabor EZY: File 2	Saki Hirata		
2027	Patlabor EZY: File 3	Saki Hirata		

=== Video games ===
List of voice performances in video games
Year	Title	Role	Notes	Source
2004–05	Futakoi games	Sumireko Ichijo	PS1/PS2	
2005–06	School Rumble games	Tenma Tsukamoto		
2006–08	True Tears	Hikari Ogasawara		
2006	KimiKiss	Yūmi Hoshino	PS2	
2006	My-Otome games	Nina Wong	PS2	
2007	Kujibiki Unbalance: Kaichō Onegai Smash Fight	Ritsuko Kübel Kettenkrad	PS2	
2007	Mega Man ZX Advent	Ashe	DS	
2007	Another Century's Episode 3: The Final	Anemone	PS2; Character from Eureka Seven	
2007	Ar Tonelico II: Melody of Metafalica	Luca Trulyworth	PS2	
2007–09	Myself; Yourself games	Nanaka Yatsushiro	PS2	
2008	Spice and Wolf: One year of me and Holo 狼と香辛料 ボクとホロの一年	Holo	DS	
2008	Persona 4	Yukiko Amagi	Also Golden in 2012	
2008	Tears to Tiara: Garland of the Earth	Rimurisu	PS3	
2008	Rune Factory Frontier	Mist	Wii	
2008	Tartaros Online	Elphintos		
2009	The Parallel of Haruhi Suzumiya	Mikoto Misumaru, Taiichiro Ijyuin	Wii	
2009	The Series of Haruhi Suzumiya	Mysterious Girl	DS	
2009–10	Dream Club	Amane	Also Portable	
2009	Spice and Wolf: Umi wo Wataru Fu 狼と香辛料 海を渡る風	Holo	DS	
2009–10	Strike Witches games	Charlotte E. Yeager	DS	
2009	Atelier Lina: The Alchemist of Strahl	Lina Atelier	DS	
2010	KOF Sky Stage	Mai Shiranui	Arcade/Xbox 360	
2010–15	Saki games	Nodoka Haramura		
2010	The King of Fighters XIII	Mai Shiranui	Arcade/PC/PS3/Xbox 360	
2010	Neo Geo Heroes: Ultimate Shooting	Mai Shiranui	PSP	
2010	.hack//Link	Saika Amagi, AIKA	PSP	
2010	Sengoku Basara: Samurai Heroes	Tsuruhime		
2010	Another Century's Episode: R	Kallen Stadtfeld	PS3	
2010	Umineko no Naku Koro ni: Majo to Suiri no Rondo	Rosa Ushiromiya	PS3	
2011	Dream Club Zero	Amane	Xbox 360	
2011	Star Driver: Kagayaki no Takuto – Ginga Bishounen Densetsu	Nichi Kate (Ivuronyu) ニチ・ケイト（イヴローニュ）	PSP	
2011	Queen's Gate: Spiral Chaos	Mai Shiranui	PSP	
2011	Sengoku Basara 3: Party (戦国BASARA3宴, Sengokaru Basara 3: Utage)	Tsuruhime		
2011	Umineko no Naku Koro ni Chiru: Shinjitsu to Gensō no Nocturne	Rosa Ushiromiya	PS3	
2012	Danganronpa 2: Goodbye Despair	Ibuki Mioda	PSP PS Vita PC Mobile Switch Xbox One PS4	
2012	Mobile Suit Gundam AGE	Arisa Gunhale	PSP; Both Universe Accel and Cosmic Drive	
2012–13	Bravely Default games	Agnès Oblige	3DS	
2012	Girl Friend Beta	Juri Furuya		
2012	Pokémon Mystery Dungeon: Gates to Infinity	Mijumaru		
2013	Horizon in the Middle of Nowhere Portable	Tomo Asama	PSP	
2013	Atelier Escha & Logy: Alchemists of the Dusk Sky	Linca	PS3	
2013	Digimon World Re:Digitize Decode	Lili	3DS	
2013	Super Robot Wars Operation Extend	Kallen Stadtfeld	PSP	
2013	The Legend of Heroes: Trails of Cold Steel	Claire Rieveldt	PS4/Steam	
2013–16	My Teen Romantic Comedy SNAFU games	Saki Kawasaki		
2014–15	Sengoku Basara 4	Tsuruhime	Also Sumeragi	
2014	Persona Q: Shadow of the Labyrinth	Yukiko Amagi	3DS	
2014	Atelier Shallie: Alchemists of the Dusk Sea	Linca	PS3	
2014	Persona 4 Arena Ultimax	Yukiko Amagi	PS3	
2014	Dengeki Bunko: Fighting Climax	Holo	from Spice and Wolf	
2014	Fate/hollow ataraxia	Caren Ortensia	Vita port	
2014	Resident Evil HD Remaster	Rebecca Chambers	PC/PS3/PS4/Xbox 360/Xbox One	
2014	The Legend of Heroes: Trails of Cold Steel II	Claire Rieveldt	PS4/Steam	
2015	Persona 4: Dancing All Night	Yukiko Amagi	Vita	
2016	Resident Evil Zero HD Remaster	Rebecca Chambers	PC/PS3/PS4/Xbox 360/Xbox One	
2016	Atelier Shallie: Alchemists of the Dusk Sea	Linca		
2016	Gundam Breaker 3	Uruchi	PS4/Vita	
2016	Granblue Fantasy	Zooey	PC/Mobile	
2016	Tales of Berseria	Eleanor Hume	PS3/PS4 in 2016, PS5/Xbox Series X/S/Nintendo Switch in 2026	
2016	The King of Fighters XIV	Mai Shiranui	PC/PS4	
2016	Dead or Alive 5 Last Round (1.08 Update)	Mai Shiranui	Arcade/PC/PS4/Xbox One	
2017	Azur Lane	Fusou, Yamashiro	Mobile	
2017	The Legend of Heroes: Trails of Cold Steel III	Musse Egret/Claire Rieveldt	PS4/Steam/Switch	
2017	Xenoblade Chronicles 2	Perun	Switch	
2018	Magia Record	Liz Hawkwood	Android/iOS	
2018	BlazBlue: Cross Tag Battle	Yukiko Amagi, Yang Xiao Long	PC/PS4/Switch	
2018	The King of Fighters All Star	Mai Shiranui	Mobile	
2018	Girls' Frontline	MG5, G36	Mobile	
2018	Princess Connect! Re:Dive	Shiori Kashiwazaki	Mobile	
2018	Fitness Boxing	Sophie	Switch	
2018	SNK Heroines: Tag Team Frenzy	Mai Shiranui	Arcade/PS4/Switch	
2018	The Legend of Heroes: Trails of Cold Steel IV	Musse Egret/Claire Rieveldt	PS4/Steam/Switch	
2018	Sdorica	Fredrica Lucien, Fredrica SP, Fredrica MZ	Mobile	
2018	Soukou Musume	Sofia Katakura	Mobile	
2019	Spice and Wolf VR	Holo	PC (VR)	
2019	Bloodstained: Ritual of the Night	Miriam	PC/PS4/Switch	
2019	Dead or Alive 6	Mai Shiranui	PC/PS4/Xbox One	
2019	Punishing: Gray Raven	Sofia	Android, iOS	
2019	Epic Seven	Destina, Ruele of Light	Mobile	
2020	Arknights	Зима (Zima), ProJekt Red	Mobile	
2020	13 Sentinels: Aegis Rim	Yuki Takamiya	PS4	
2020	Genshin Impact	Beidou	Mobile/PC/PS4/Switch	
2020	The Legend of Heroes: Trails into Reverie	Musse Egret/Claire Rieveldt	PS4/PS5/Switch	
2020	Fitness Boxing 2: Rhythm and Exercise	Sophie	Switch	
2021	Fate/Grand Order	Caren C. Hortensia/Amor	iOS/Android	
2021	Blue Archive	Mikamo Neru	Mobile	
2021	Alchemy Stars	Carleen	Mobile	
2021	Project Neural Cloud	Centaureissi	Mobile	
2021	Grand Chase:Dimensional Chaser	Calisto Jupiter	Mobile	
2022	The King of Fighters XV	Mai Shiranui		
2022	Eve: Ghost Enemies	Ivanka Restrage	PS4/Switch	
2022	Soul Hackers 2	Milady	PS4/PS5/Xbox Series S & X/PC	
2022	Xenoblade Chronicles 3	Alexandria	Nintendo Switch	
2022	Path to Nowhere	Nox	Android, iOS	
2022	Goddess of Victory: Nikke	Guillotine	Mobile	
2022	Two Jong Cell!!	Karen Virgin Volts	PS4	
2023	Fate/Samurai Remnant	Takao Dayu		
2023	Reverse 1999	Arcana	PC/Mobile	
2024	Umamusume: Pretty Derby	Sonon Elfie	Mobile	
2024	Wuthering Waves	Yinlin	PC/iOS/Android/PS5	
2024	Zenless Zone Zero	Hoshimi Miyabi	Mobile/PC/PS5	
2025	Street Fighter 6	Mai Shiranui	PC/PS4/PS5/XSX (DLC)	
2025	Fatal Fury: City of the Wolves	Mai Shiranui	PC/PS4/PS5/XSX	
2025	Magical Girl Witch Trials	Hasumi Leia	PC	
2025	Brown Dust 2	Darian	Mobile	
2026	Nekopara: Sekai Connect	Miracle	Android, iOS	
2027	Danganronpa 2x2	Ibuki Mioda	Switch/Switch 2/Playstation 5/Windows/Xbox Series X/S	

=== Audio performances ===
List of voice performances in audio recordings and radio
Title	Role	Notes	Source
Code Geass	Kallen Stadtfeld	Drama CD	
Shinakoi しなこいっ	Sakura Touyama	Drama CD	
Dog Days	Leonmicheli Galette de Rois	Drama CD	
Idolmaster Xenoglossia	Takatsuki Yayoi	Drama CD	
Lucky Star	Kagami Hiiragi	Drama CD	
Nakaimo: Dorama CD kono natsu ni ikutsu ka, omoide ga aru! この中に1人、妹がいる！ ドラマCD この夏にいくつか、思い出がある！	水谷衣楠	Drama CD	
Omamori Himari	Himari	Drama CD	
The Girl Who Leapt Through Space	Mintao	Drama CD	
Ane Log: Moyako Neesan no Tomaranai 姉ログ 靄子姉さんの止まらないモノローグ	Moyako Konoe	Drama CD	
MC Akushizu Drama CD Bishoujo Heiki F-X ha Ore no Yome!	Shall	Drama CD	
D-Frag!		Drama CD	
Twinkle Stars	Hijiri Honjou	Drama CD	

=== Dubbing roles ===
==== Live-action ====
Title	Role	Voice dub for	Notes	Source
Chocolate	Zen	Yanin Vismitananda		
The Kick	Wawa	Yanin Vismitananda		
This Girl is Bad Ass	Jukkalan	Yanin Vismitananda		
Tom Yum Goong 2	Ping Ping	Yanin Vismitananda		
Anna and the Apocalypse	Anna Shepherd	Ella Hunt		
Big	Gil Da-ran	Lee Min-jung		
The Big Bang Theory	Ramona Nowitzki	Riki Lindhome		
Cold Case	Sarah Blake	Spencer Locke		
Crazy Ex-Girlfriend	Ashley Pratt	Megan Heyn		
Crisis in Six Scenes	Ellie	Rachel Brosnahan		
Crouching Tiger, Hidden Dragon: Sword of Destiny	Snow Vase	Natasha Liu Bordizzo		
CSI: Miami	Shea Williamson	Vanessa Lengies	season 9	
CSI: Miami	Tara Price	Megalyn Echikunwoke	season 7	
Dragonball Evolution	Chi Chi	Jamie Chung		
Glee	Betty Pillsbury	Ali Stroker	season 4	
The King of Fighters	Mai Shiranui	Maggie Q		
Knock Knock	Genesis	Lorenza Izzo		
Lost Girl	Kathy	Katherine Ashby		
Nerve	Vee	Emma Roberts		
Outcast	Allison Barnes	Kate Lyn Sheil		
The Pretty One	Laurel Audrey	Zoe Kazan		
Project Runway	Karlie Kloss			
Supernatural	Reese	Anja Savcic	season 11	

==== Animation ====
Title	Role	Notes	Source
Barbie: The Princess & the Popstar	Princess Tori		
Inside Out 2	Joy		
Little Princess	Princess		
My Little Pony: Equestria Girls series	Sunset Shimmer		
Resident Evil: Death Island	Rebecca Chambers		
RWBY	Yang Xiao Long		
Gameoverse	Miss Information		

== Discography ==
=== Albums ===
List of albums, with selected chart positions
Title	Album information	Oricon
Title	Album information	Peak position
Natural (ナチュラル)	Released: March 22, 2006; Label: Nippon Columbia; Catalog No.: COZX-204/5	187

=== Character singles and albums ===
List of character singles and albums with selected chart positions
Title	Album information	Oricon
Title	Album information	Peak position
TVアニメ「境界線上のホライゾン」演目披露(ザ・レパートリー)第3弾 (TV Anime Horizon on the Middle of Nowhere repertoire showcase (The repertoire) 3rd)	Released: June 27, 2002; Label: Lantis; Catalog No.: LACM-4898	31
"Que Sera Sera" (けせら・せら, Kesera Serra)	Released: May 21, 2003; Label: Marvelous AQL; Catalog No.: MJCG-83022	–
Sailing to the Future (Aika R-16: Virgin Mission character CD)	Released: March 28, 2007; Label: Nippon Columbia; Catalog No.: COZX-253/4	48
"Flying Kid" / "Dream Hunter" (Aika Zero character CD)	Released: November 4, 2009; Label: Nippon Columbia; Catalog No. COCX-35797	–
神のみキャラCD.5 – 春日楠 starring 小清水亜美 (The World God Only Knows Character CD 5: Kusunoki Kasuga starring Ami Koshimizu)	Released: June 1, 2011; Label: NBC Universal Entertainment Japan; Catalog No.: GNCA-0206	91

=== Video albums ===
List of video albums with selected chart positions
Title	Album information	Oricon
Title	Album information	Peak position
Present	Released: March 22, 2006; Label: Nippon Columbia; Catalog No. COBC-4508	239
