= Jane Doe (Zenless Zone Zero) =

- Zenless Zone Zero character
- Jane Doe in Zenless Zone Zero
- First game: Zenless Zone Zero (2024)
- Voiced by: EN: Kelsey Jaffer; ZH: Zeng Tong; JA: Yū Shimamura; KO: Jang Ye-na

In-universe information
- Species: Rat Thiren
- Weapon: Knives
- Attribute: Physical

Jane Doe (Chinese: 简·杜; pinyin: Jiǎn Dù) is a character in the video game Zenless Zone Zero, developed by miHoYo. She is a rat Thiren, a humanoid species that typically has the ears, tail(s) or other body parts of the animal they represent. Jane Doe is a criminal behavior specialist working for New Eridu Public Security, the police department of the city in which the game takes place. Jane Doe was released as a playable character in version 1.1 of the game in August 2024. Commentary on Jane Doe was mostly positive, largely focusing on her provocative and flirtatious character design as well as speculation about her true identity.

== Design ==
Created for Zenless Zone Zero, a free-to-play action role-playing game developed and published by miHoYo, Jane Doe was initially revealed to be an important figure in the game's criminal underworld and a member of the violent Mountain Lion Gang. She is a Thiren, a race of humanoids with prominent animal characteristics, in this case that of a rat. Although it was not originally known what faction she belonged to, it was revealed in the game's story that she was not actually a member of the Mountain Lion Gang, but in fact a criminal behavior specialist and police officer who had infiltrated them while working for New Eridu Public Security, the police department of the city in which the game takes place. She has adopted various aliases in the past and has mastered the arts of disguise and evading capture.

Her outfit includes high-waisted shorts layered over ripped tights, a small waist and large hips, a devil-like tail and rat ears. One stocking exposes part of her thigh, and she wears a belt-like accessory which is sewn onto her jacket. She is the first playable character in the game with her own special walking animation, and her resting posture uses the loops on her jacket to mirror rat or mouse paws.

Jane Doe is voiced in Chinese by Zeng Tong, in English by Kelsey Jaffer, in Japanese by Yū Shimamura, and in Korean by Jang Ye-na.

== Appearances ==
Jane Doe is initially encountered as a member of the Mountain Lion Gang, a violent criminal syndicate. During a Public Security raid, she helps the gang escape and follows them to their headquarters, the Lion's Den, gathering information on their operations and discovering their use of a stable fissure in Hollow Zero to evade authorities. After the gang's hostages escape, Jane pursues them and reveals that she is an undercover Public Security agent. She defeats the gang's leader, Razor, and escapes with the hostages, while Public Security apprehends the remaining members. Public Security later reveals that Jane infiltrated the gang as part of an operation to locate their headquarters, and that she is actually a criminal behavior specialist who works for them.

In the game's main story, Jane works with the Proxy and their sibling to investigate malfunctioning Intelligent Constructs (robots). She investigates the music group Angels of Delusion and helps contain its member Aria after she is controlled by the rogue artificial intelligence Youkai. During Aria's rampage, Jane orders the Proxies to evacuate and attempts to contain her. Jane initially plans to take Aria into custody but permits the Proxies to restore her after they demonstrate that she is no longer dangerous. Jane later goes undercover again, posing as a smuggling contact to lure the criminal Bringer into a trap; he is subsequently killed in combat.

Jane Doe uses knives as weapons for combat. She relies on fast, multi-hit physical attacks to build a statistic called Passion Stream and enter the Passion state, which grants her enhanced mobility and access to powerful spinning attacks. When entering the field through chain attacks or through her ultimate, Jane instantly maxes out her Passion Stream to maintain continuous physical damage against enemies.

== Promotion ==
Jane Doe made her first appearance in the launch trailer for Zenless Zone Zero, which was released on July 3, 2024. Unlike most other characters in the game, her release materials did not reveal what faction she belonged to. She was released in version 1.1 of the game on August 14, 2024. A video analyzing her gameplay was released on August 27, 2024, and a character teaser was published two days later. Another video showing her background and personality was released on September 3. Jane Doe received a new skin in version 2.5 of the game on December 30, 2025.

== Reception ==
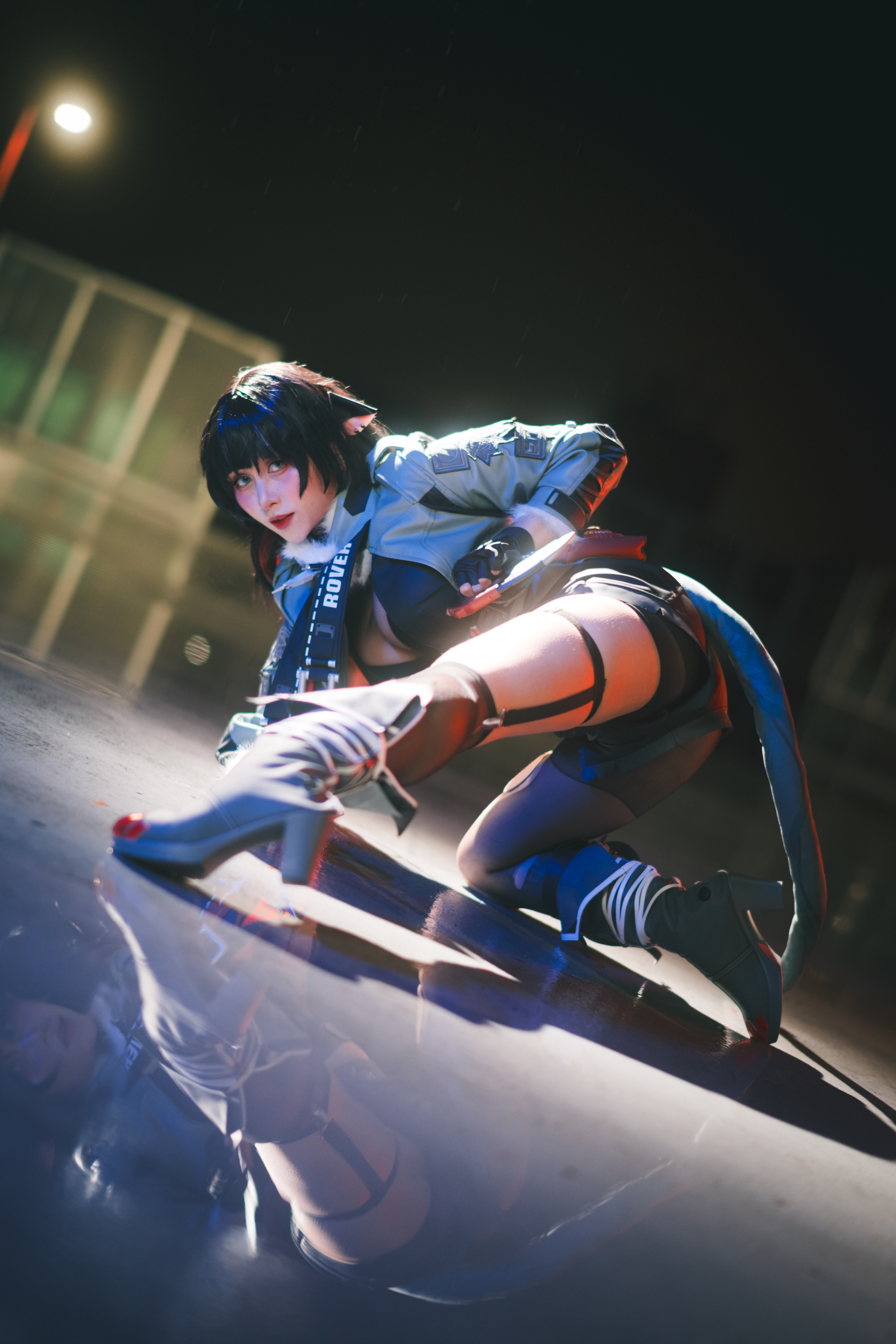
A cosplayer as Jane Doe

Jane Doe became one of Zenless Zone Zero's most discussed characters, with her flirtatious presentation and provocative design drawing attention from fans, according to Siliconera writer Jenni Lada and Esports writer XC Enriquez. Fans have expressed love for the character via cosplay. GamesRadar+ writer Austin Wood praised Jane as one of HoYoverse's strongest characters in terms of design, calling her silhouette fantastic and writing that the way she uses the loops on her jacket in her resting posture was clever. Her design also includes more overtly suggestive touches, like a small devil tail wrapped around her leg, while social media fixated on the jiggle of her thighs, in particular the exposed portion of her left leg. Fans responded enthusiastically to this, with social media outlets such as TikTok becoming full of edits and reactions to Jane Doe. A short clip featuring Jane's walking animation inspired what Polygon writer Ana Diaz referred to as "feral responses". At the same time, her presentation was not universally acclaimed; some players liked her design but objected to the way she was portrayed in promotional videos, while other players questioned miHoYo's decision to use such a sexualized trailer to market the character. Diaz wrote that this reflects a broader tension surrounding miHoYo's character designs: the studio has long catered to a fan base that enjoys thirsting over its characters while also needing to balance that appeal against accusations of oversexualization. With Jane Doe, however, some observers argued that Zenless Zone Zero was leaning heavily into that portion of its audience.

Jane Doe's mysterious nature was also analyzed by critics. Lada indicated that some of her voice lines suggested that Jane was not a trustworthy character, while Kristine "Kurisu" Tuting of ONE Esports described her as captivating, elusive and deadly. PCGamesN writer Ken Allsop said that while her faction was not revealed by her promotional materials, this was fitting given her name. Fans consequently speculated about almost everything surrounding her identity, including guessing which animal she resembled more. Allsop personally felt she was more akin to a mouse because of her tail. Other theories suggested that Jane might be an undercover Public Security officer, a defector of some sort, or part of another faction. Sorisu of GAME Watch said that Jane's central motif was modeled after mice, and that when she was standing or walking she hooked both of her thumbs into the rings located on her belt, a posture which they said resembles a mouse standing up. Even after more information was revealed, Allsop wrote that he was still curios about what Jane was doing while infiltrating the Mountain Lion Gang. Her role as an undercover operative also created a problem with the game's storytelling, according to a writer from Game Grape. Because the Proxy could not directly observe Jane's activities, the story could not simply depict her missions from the usual player perspective. The writer argued that this limitation helped inspire a different storytelling mode in which players directly control Jane Doe herself; since the Proxy is absent here, the game could also dispense with other storytelling modes that were used to remotely direct characters at the time, transitioning directly from story scenes into combat. The sequence also incorporates direct exploration of the map, effectively previewing Zenless Zone Zero's broader approach to letting players explore the world as individual characters. The writer also argued that the Mountain Lions were able to stay hidden from Public Security for so long by exploiting the ability to transfer between different Hollows via transfer stations as an example of Zenless Zone Zero's commitment to building stories strictly around its core world-building rules.

Jane Doe's gameplay received mixed evaluations. Writer Holly Alice of Pocket Tactics was reminded of the character Boothill from Honkai: Star Rail because both characters need a specific statistic and particular teammates in order to do well in combat. A writer for Gamersky, on the other hand, praised her on-field damage and ability to trigger critical hits in certain situations.
