= Hoshimi Miyabi =

Fictional character in Zenless Zone Zero

- Zenless Zone Zero character
- Hoshimi Miyabi in Zenless Zone Zero
- First game: Zenless Zone Zero (2024)
- Voiced by: EN: Cristina Vee; ZH: Ruan Congqing; JA: Ami Koshimizu; KO: Kim Do-hee

In-universe information
- Species: Fox Thiren
- Weapon: Katana
- Attribute: Ice

Hoshimi Miyabi (Chinese: 星见雅; pinyin: Xīngjiàn Yǎ) is a character in the video game Zenless Zone Zero, developed by miHoYo. She is a fox Thiren, a humanoid species that typically has the ears, tail(s) or other body parts of the animal they represent. Miyabi is a swordswoman who leads a combat unit called Hollow Special Operations Section 6 (typically referred to as simply "Section 6") and is a member of the Void Hunters, an elite group of fighters. Miyabi was released as a playable character in December 2024 in version 1.4 of the game.

Commentary on the character has largely focused on the contrast between her stoic public image and awkward everyday personality, her Japanese-inspired visual design and swordsmanship, and her popularity among players. Certain commentators also credited anticipation surrounding her release with contributing to renewed interest in the game.

== Characterization and design ==
Created for Zenless Zone Zero, a free-to-play action role-playing game developed and published by miHoYo, Miyabi is a member of a renowned family of samurai. She is a Thiren, a race of humanoids with prominent animal characteristics, in this case that of a fox. She also serves as a member of the Void Hunters, a group of very powerful fighters primarily known for protecting the city of New Eridu in which the game takes place, acting as their chief of Hollow Special Operations Section 6, a combat unit. She wields the Hoshimi Family's heirloom katana, called Tailless. Visually, Miyabi's design consists of large fox ears, long black hair, combat gloves, heeled boots, a jacket similar to a kimono, and a long skirt. She is clumsy, straightforward and honest. She sometimes speaks in an archaic manner of speech that is very indirect and complex, sometimes necessitating other characters to interpret for her.

One of the game's producers identified her as one of the more difficult characters the game had developed, explaining that characters with especially high player expectations required repeated internal revisions. Different members of the development team had different opinions regarding the length of her skirt, for example, but eventually it was decided to give her a long skirt because it better suited her profession and emphasized her personality, which the producer described as serious and stoic. They also indicated that a character's in-game strength in combat is tied directly to their narrative background and lore. Because Miyabi was the only playable Void Hunter character at the time, they made her considerably more powerful than other playable characters to align with these expectations.

She is voiced in Chinese by Ruan Congqing, in English by Cristina Vee, in Japanese by Ami Koshimizu, and in Korean by Kim Do-hee. During beta testing, she was originally voiced in Chinese by Du Mingya.

== Appearances ==
Miyabi first appeared in Zenless Zone Zero, introduced in a 2024 update for the game. She serves as the chief of Section 6 and leads the unit during dangerous operations involving threats to New Eridu, the city in which the game is primarily set. She is also a member of the Void Hunters, a group of exceptionally capable combatants involved in defending the city. As section chief, Miyabi takes an active role in Section 6's missions rather than directing them from a distance. In one such mission, two hundred civilians and personnel become trapped while the surrounding area faces the threat of greater destruction. Officials propose sacrificing those trapped to prevent wider damage to New Eridu, but Miyabi rejects the plan and insists on allowing time for a rescue attempt. This decision becomes an important moment in Section 6's development and establishes her commitment to protecting the lives of the public.

In gameplay, Miyabi fights mostly with a sword and uses both physical and frost-based attacks. Her combat style revolves around building a resource called Fallen Frost, which can be spent to enter a charged state and unleash a powerful strike with her sword. She can gain additional Fallen Frost through several of her stronger attacks.

== Promotion and merchandising ==
Miyabi was first revealed during a promotional video for Zenless Zone Zero in May 2022. Miyabi made her first appearance in the game in version 1.2, released on September 25, 2024, as a non-player character. On November 8, miHoYo uploaded a video to their social media, formally introducing players to the character. They released a character teaser for her as well as an animated short film detailing her past on December 16, 2024. She was released two days later in version 1.4 of the game, and on that same day they uploaded a video analyzing her combat skills.

On December 6, 2024, it was announced that miHoYo would be collaborating with the convenience store chain FamilyMart, in which locations across Japan would feature characters including Miyabi. miHoYo also revealed they would be collaborating with Fanta to release drinks in China on June 16, 2025, and Miyabi featured in some of the advertisements holding a can of soda. On August 25, 2025, miHoYo and tech manufacturer Razer Inc. announced a collaboration to release merchandise based on Miyabi. The items available for purchase included gaming chairs, keyboards, mice and mousepads. The products were set to ship in late September.

== Critical reception ==
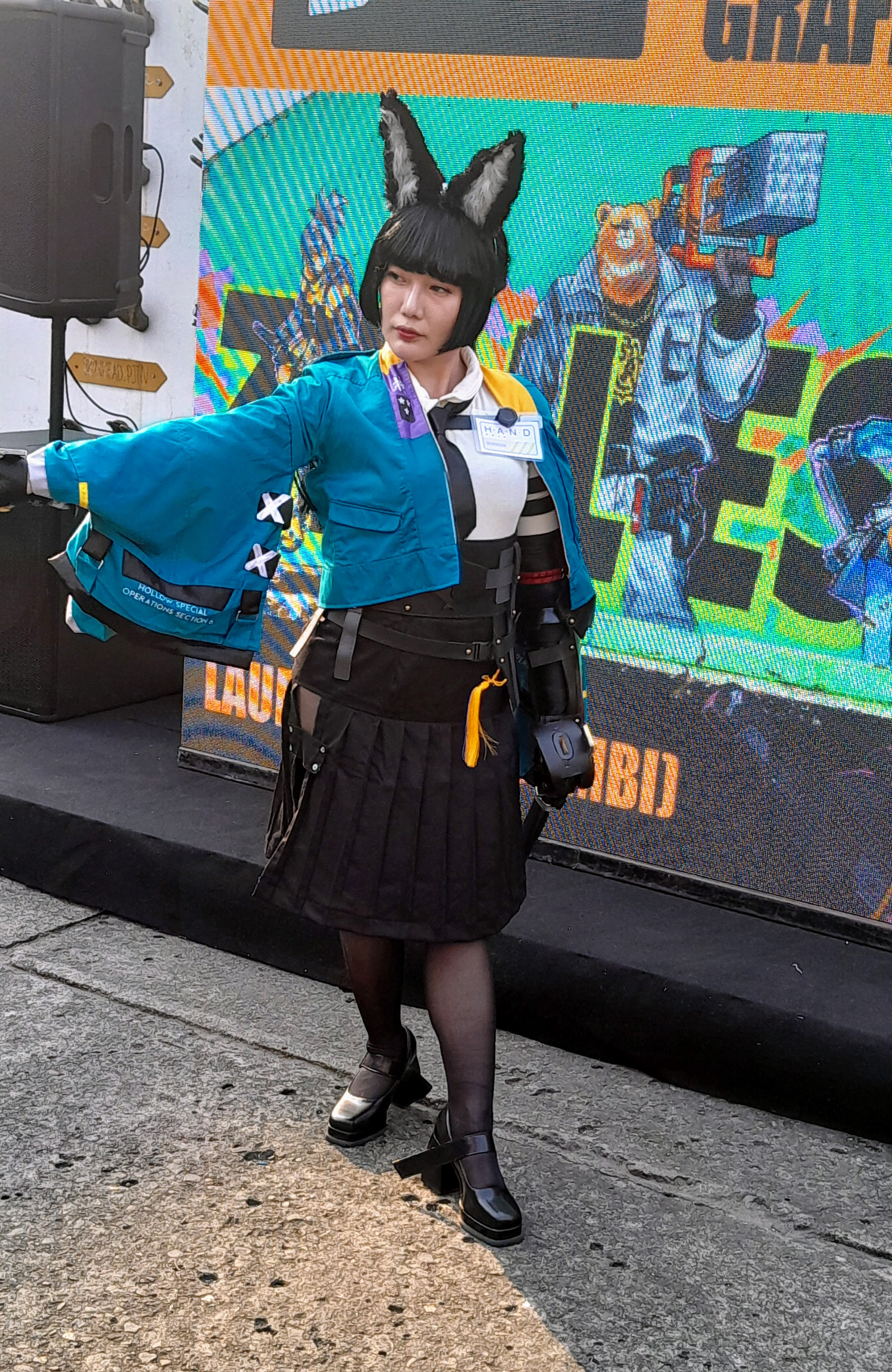
Cosplay of Hoshimi Miyabi

Hoshimi Miyabi was generally well received. Fans expressed appreciation for the character via cosplay and fan art. Inven reporter Park Gwang-seok indicated that most Zenless Zone Zero players had been waiting for Miyabi, and that her addition into the game as a playable character had generated substantial excitement around the version 1.4 update. Writer Teahouse Waiter of Chinese outlet Game Teahouse argued that Miyabi accounted for sixty to seventy percent of that update's success, driving unprecedented community engagement. Wai Li of 4Gamers characterized Miyabi as the flagship character being used by HoYoverse to increase the game's popularity: prior to version 1.4, Zenless Zone Zero faced criticism regarding its commercial performance and longevity. Following the release of version 1.4, the game reached the top of the Chinese App Store's grossing chart. Teahouse Waiter attributed much of the update's increased attention to anticipation surrounding Miyabi and argued that this allowed the game to rebound, saying that in character-driven gacha games, player feelings are driven by emotional connection. Teahouse Waiter argued that Miyabi functioned as a hook to get players to experience the system fixes and structural overhaul implemented by the developers for version 1.4.

In an analysis, writer Tea Pudding of INSIDE contrasted Miyabi's serious public image with her lack of practical skills in non-combat situations, saying one of her most defining characteristics is her clumsiness. Tea Pudding also classified her as technologically challenged, and said that their initial impression of her was that she was rigid and stiff, but that over the course of the story it was revealed that she was much more easygoing and laid-back than they initially thought. Tea Pudding also argued that despite her serious demeanor and sense of duty, Miyabi was not a flawless robot. They argued that her solemn facade was softened by her mundane hobby of collecting swords to fill shelves in her spare time.

Shu Hosaka of Dengeki Online highlighted the incident where corporate advisors and politicians treated those trapped in danger as statistical "noise" and supported sacrificing them to limit damage to New Eridu. By rejecting their reasoning, Hosaka wrote, Miyabi affirmed that each individual life matters and deserves an attempt at rescue. Hosaka regarded this as the thematic "dawn" of Section 6: Miyabi's willingness to risk everything to accomplish what some people thought was impossible earns the respect and trust of others and transforms the group from a bureaucratic organization into a team united by principle. Respondents to a survey also conducted by Dengeki Online likewise cited Miyabi as a memorable character for bringing the storyline of version 1.4 to its end. Tea Pudding praised the presentation of her first appearance, describing it as a dramatic introduction befitting someone already established among the strongest figures in the story, while emphasizing that Miyabi remains conscious of the responsibility accompanying her strength and is committed to preserving law and order.

Miyabi's appearance was generally well received. Tea Pudding wrote that because she had large fox ears and wielded a katana, she "had the appearance of a traditional Japanese beauty". They indicated that they fell in love with her design upon seeing it for the first time, calling her visual style and iaijutsu technique cool. Tea Pudding also argued that her design blends traditional Japanese aesthetics with modern military gear, and her swordplay stands out because of its balance between speed and composure. They argued that fast dashes and inertia-based kicks contrast with solemn iaijutsu stances and post-slash zanshin focus, and they concluded that her design and screen presence make her one of the game's most compelling characters. According to Zang Defeng of LTN, Taiwanese netizens on one internet forum pointed out that the highlight reflection in her eyes resembles the Blue Sky with a White Sun emblem of the flag of Taiwan, while her red iris resembles the red part of the flag. Fans also began editing Miyabi's ears to exaggerated lengths, creating a recurring meme. Game*Spark writer Keshino indicated that a key trigger for this was her official in-game profile listing her height, including her ears, as 170 centimeters (5.6 ft). This led fans to joke that her actual height is heavily padded by her ears. Eventually, the meme became so popular that in version 2.3 of the game, miHoYo added an in-game dialogue reference about a collective online drawing event where people keep adding length to her ears.
