= List of Omamori Himari episodes =

Cover of the first DVD volume of Omamori Himari as released by Kadokawa Pictures on March 26, 2010.

Omamori Himari is an anime series adapted from the manga of the same title by Milan Matra. The story centers on Yuto Amakawa, a boy who, on day of his sixteenth birthday, meets Himari, a cat spirit in the form of a beautiful young girl. He learns from her that he is the descendant of one of the twelve Demon Slayer families that had slain ayakashi since feudal times, and that Himari has sworn an oath to protect him from the ayakashi that is out to kill him until his power awaken. He later meets other girls who start out as enemies, but later become rivals for Yuto's affection as the series progresses. The anime follows the first twenty-nine chapters of the manga, with moderate changes to the original's storyline.

Produced by Zexcs and directed by Shinji Ushiro, the series was broadcast on TV Saitama and Chiba TV from January 6 to March 24, 2010, with subsequent broadcasts on Tokyo MX, TV Aichi, tvk, TVQ, and Sun Television. English-subtitled simulcasts were provided by Crunchyroll following its premiere date. Six DVD compilation volumes were released by Kadokawa Pictures between March 26 and August 28, 2010, with limited edition volumes also released. A Blu-ray box set was released on January 27, 2012.

The opening theme is "Oshichau zo!!" (押しちゃうぞっ!!) performed by AyaRuka, which consists of singers Aya Sakamoto and Ruka Kawada, while the ending theme is "BEAM my BEAM" performed by Himarinko L. Shizukuesu (ひまりんこ・L・しずくえす), which consists of the main female cast with the seventh episode version sung by Ami Koshimizu, the eighth episode version sung by Iori Nomizu, the ninth episode version sung by Kei Shindo, the tenth episode version sung by Asuka Ōgame, and the eleventh episode version sung by Yuki Matsuoka. The ending theme which is used in episode 12 is "Sakamichi no Hate" (坂道の果て; "At the End of the Hill) performed by Yuto Amakawa (Daisuke Hirakawa).

== Episode list ==
No.	Title	Original release date
1	"Cat and Girl and Allergy"; Transliteration: "Neko to Shōjo to Arerugī" (Japanese: 猫と少女とアレルギー)	January 6, 2010
On the day of Yuto Amakawa's 16th birthday, he and his childhood friend Rinko meet a mysterious katana-wielding girl on their way to school. The girl starts to come on to Yuto to Rinko's shock, causing her to drag him away. At school during a heated argument on the rooftop, Yuto and Rinko are attacked by their friend Taizo who is possessed by a demon spirit until the mysterious girl from earlier exorcises it and kills it. Later that night, Yuto is visited by the mysterious girl who introduces herself as the cat spirit Himari, and explains that he is being targeted by various ayakashi who are out to kill him and that she will protect him from them due to an ancient vow. However, the appearance of her cat ears and tail triggers Yuto's cat allergies, and at the same time Rinko appears unexpectedly and causes a ruckus after seeing them together. The following day, Himari transfers to Yuto and Rinko's school. In a flashback from the night before, Himari reveals that Yuto's family (i.e., the Amakawa Family) is one of the twelve Demon Slayer families that has protected mankind from ayakashi for hundreds of years, and that one of her ancestors was spared by Yuto's ancestor, leading to a vow from her kind to forever serve them. Refusing to accept this fact, Rinko challenges Himari to a sports battle (which includes running, high jump, kendo, judo and tennis), only for her to lose in all of them despite being the school's best athlete. After being told by Himari that she lacks the strength to protect Yuto, Rinko insults her by calling her a monster. On the school rooftop, Himari asks Yuto if it is okay to have an ayakashi like her around him. Yuto, understanding that she is only concerned about his well-being just like his grandparents were, allows her to perform her duty. The next morning, Rinko comes to apologize to Yuto, only to see Himari in his bed again, much to her annoyance and it turns into yet another ruckus. Meanwhile, a mizuchi or water deity named Shizuku appears to the other ayakashi, claiming she will kill Yuto herself.
2	"Sea Cat Scramble"; Transliteration: "Umineko Sukuranburu" (Japanese: 海ねこスクランブル)	January 13, 2010
Yuto, Himari, and Rinko are invited by their class representative for a trip to the beach as a welcome to Himari. While walking home from school, Yuto reluctantly agrees to take Himari swimsuit shopping, and Himari goes on ahead of him. While calling Rinko, it starts to rain heavily, forcing Yuto to take shelter under a bridge where Shizuku appears and warns that she will kill him if he goes on with his Demon Slayer heritage, vanishing with the rain clearing up. Rinko joins Yuto and Himari at the department store, where Rinko helps Himari decide on a swim suit and Yuto chooses a Western-style dress for her. At the beach, it is revealed that Himari is afraid of water, and Rinko throws her an inflatable whale toy to float on. While the others are having fun, Himari, having drifted far from the shore, gets a startling visit from Yuto when a giant wave appears from behind and crashes onto them. Both of them survive but are dragged down into the ocean by a set of tentacles. After regaining consciousness, Yuto meets Shizuku, who warns him that his awakening as a Demon Slayer will destroy the balance between humans and ayakashi. Just when she is about to kill him, Himari intervenes to stop her. But suddenly the tentacle monster reappears from the sea behind them. Seizing the moment Himari's attack on Shizuku failed, it captures Himari and keeps her upside down above itself. As Himari attempts to get rid of tentacles as soon as possible, her cat ears emerge. At first as Himari's right arm was free, allowing her to chop binding and break free by herself. With a flip in the air, Himari jumped off the monster and tried to land on ground. However the tentacles were numerous also way too fast, she was being recaptured in midair and pulled back to the monster. Subsequently, Himari thrashed around, struggling fiercely against her restraints, but all fruitless, she still trapped in "M-shaped legs" posture by tentacles. This time, both her arms and legs were tied up, especially her wrists and ankles. So she couldn't move or cut the tentacles that were holding her. Thus allowing Shizuku to conjures up a whirlpool to drown Himari while the tentacles ensnared and prevented her escape. Yuto quickly jumps into the whirlpool and attempts to rescue her. After that, Himari saves him by stabbing her thigh with one of Shizuku's ice spikes, causing the whirlpool to disintegrate from her blood, and destroys the tentacle monster by hand chop. Himari tells Yuto to run while she holds Shizuku off despite her injury but Yuto refuses, telling her not to sacrifice herself for his sake. Deducing there is something unusual about them, Shizuku withdraws from the battle, but not before telling them that she will kill them next time.
3	"Maid in Cat"; Transliteration: "Meido in Neko" (Japanese: メイドinネコ)	January 20, 2010
While taking his bath, Yuto gets a startling visit from Shizuku. Rinko and Himari barge in, with Himari slicing Shizuku in half only for her to reappear behind Yuto. Yuto passes out in the bathtub; after regaining his senses, he explains to Shizuku that he does not want to kill ayakashi just because he is a Demon Slayer and claims he wants to live a normal life. This inspires Shizuku to move in to keep an eye on him, to everyone's shock. The next day after being complimented by Yuto about her housework, Shizuku berates Himari on her inability to do anything else besides fighting, deeming her as unfeminine. Later, Yuto, Rinko, and Shizuku arrive at Café Relish, where Himari has gotten a job as a cat-eared maid (which sets off Yuto's allergies). Following an intervention from Lizlet, the café's head waitress after Himari is caught flirting with Yuto, Himari warns him that Liz may be an ayakashi. Meanwhile, Liz grows suspicious of Yuto's constant watching, and thinks he may be out to destroy her. In an attempt to save herself, she spikes his tea with magic tea leaves, but her plan is foiled when Shizuku tastes the spiked tea and gives it to Taizo, who drinks it and leaves the café under the tea's magic. Liz unleashes a cloud of magic tea leaves, causing everyone else present in the cafe to leave as well. Himari reveals Liz to be a Tsukumogami or artifact spirit after she stabs Liz with her Yasutsuna to no effect, and when she tries to destroy Liz's true form–an antique teacup, it falls out of her hand with Liz failing to catch it. Yuto catches it at the last second, saving her. After coming to an understanding with him, Liz apologizes for her actions, with Himari and Shizuku contemplating Yuto's kindness. The next morning, Yuto wakes up to see Rinko, Shizuku, and Himari, all dressed in cat-maid costumes as they jump onto his bed.
4	"The White Cat of Noihara"; Transliteration: "Noihara no Shiroi Neko" (Japanese: 野井原の白いネコ)	January 27, 2010
In an attempt to make Yuto remember his forgotten past, Himari decides to invite him to go to Noihara with her. Unfortunately, Rinko and Shizuku tag along with them on their own agendas to Himari's disappointment. Upon arriving at Yuto's late grandparents' house, they are greeted by the Zashiki-warashi Kaya, who bears a grudge against Yuto for having Himari leave her by herself. Later on, after remembering his past with Himari through a walk in the forest, the Hinoenma Ageha appears for Yuto's life, and just when they are about to retreat to the house, a Daidarabotchi blocks their path. Back at the house, Rinko, Kaya, and Shizuku are attacked by an Ippon-Datara named Sasa. Back at the forest, Himari has a tough time fighting Ageha and the Daidarabotchi and orders Yuto to head back to the house. However, while running, he hesitates to let himself be protected by Himari and heads back to the battle, where he blocks Ageha's finishing blow with his body. Himari, after seeing the scar on his chest, loses her sanity and goes on a rampage, incapacitating the Daidarabotchi and almost killing Ageha until Yuto intervenes by grabbing a nearby twig and blocking the final blow. Suddenly, the twig starts to glow with a bright light which envelops the battlefield.
5	"A Troubled Cat and Composure"; Transliteration: "Nayameru Neko to Heijōshin" (Japanese: 悩める猫と平常心)	February 3, 2010
When Himari comes to her senses following her battle with Ageha, she sees a naked Shizuku rubbing her body against Yuto to her shock, only to learn she is only healing his wound with her water, and Shizuku scolds Himari on her inability to protect Yuto. Back at the house, Shizuku explains to him and Rinko about the Demon Slayers and the Amakawa's Light Ferry ability. Shizuku also reveals to Yuto that Himari's ancestors once killed and consumed humans, and warns him that Himari will be more prone to reverting to her kind's natural instincts should she keep fighting. Later, on their way back to the house, Yuto thanks Himari for making him remember his past and tells her about the kiss on the lake, thinking that the girl at the lake might be her. However, Himari tells him that the first time she appeared as a human was on the day of his 16th birthday, leaving Yuto puzzled about the girl's identity. Later on, Yuto trains with Shizuku at a nearby park in an attempt to awaken his Light Ferry ability but is beaten easily. In an attempt to train his composure, Shizuku calls Liz and Rinko over, with Liz flirting with Yuto to Rinko's anger. However, the composure training soon turns into an out-of-control harem act and a fight for Yuto's kiss until an enraged Himari appears, which leads to her smothering his face with her breasts while triggering his allergies. The next day during their walk home after school, a mysterious white-haired girl appears and introduces herself as the Demon Slayer of the Jinguji Family: Kuesu.
6	"Kiss x Cat x KISS"; Transliteration: "Kisu x Neko x KISS" (Japanese: キス×ネコ×KISS)	February 10, 2010
Himari engages in a fight with Kuesu but gets cut off when the latter puts up a barrier to keep her away. Inside the barrier, Kuesu reveals that Yuto's grandfather had arranged their marriage. Kuesu then kisses Yuto, causing the latter to remember the kiss by the lake where it is revealed the girl kissing him was actually Kuesu. Himari breaks through the barrier but Kuesu escapes and kisses Yuto again to her annoyance, with Kuesu claiming it is her third kiss with him. She then tells Yuto to cut his relations with the ayakashi and vanishes. At the forest, the other ayakashi are talking about Kuesu's recent appearance and Yuto's powers awakening until Shizuku intervenes, telling she will kill Kuesu herself. Back at Yuto's house, Himari grow irritated at Kuesu kissing Yuto, and practices kissing in front of a mirror. Meanwhile, Kuesu engages Shizuku in an intensifying fight, which ends with her pinning Shizuku on the back of a billboard. However, when Shizuku teases Kuesu on her spells and insults her being the weakest of the twelve families, a vexed Kuesu casts a barrage of powerful fire spells, forcing Shizuku to retreat. Back at Yuto's house, Himari has trouble going to sleep over the kiss from earlier. Desperate, she asks Yuto to kiss her much to his shock. After explaining her current situation to him, she apologizes and decides to go back until Yuto grabs her wrist. Just when he was about to kiss her on the cheek, the doorbell rings and just before Himari could tell him about it, she gets kissed on the lips to Yuto's shock. In her joy at her first kiss, Himari's cat ears begin showing, while back at the hotel, Kuesu reinforces her goal to obtain Yuto.
7	"The Cat's Feelings and the Magical Girl's Melancholy"; Transliteration: "Neko no Omoi to Mahō Shōjo no Yūutsu" (Japanese: 猫の想いと魔法少女のユウウツ)	February 17, 2010
After the girls' research of Kuesu leads to them discovering that Kuesu's family rose to power as Demon Slayers using Western magic, Kuesu herself arrives to everyone's surprise, informing Yuto about their future marriage. Yuto, however, refuses to agree to it unless she can change her views about the ayakashi. Following a brief scuffle between Kuesu and Rinko, Himari intervenes and mentions the three kisses she gave Yuto as well as the kiss she received from him to everyone's shock. Kuesu counters by telling them about the promise they have made in their childhood which Yuto has no memory about. Later on after school, Himari faces off against Kuesu, gaining the upper hand with her agility. However, the battle quickly turns in Kuesu's favor when she starts shooting Himari with her magic gun and casts a fire spell on the ground before Himari could attack, forcing her to use her Yasutsuna as a step to escape the flames. Himari is soon hit by one of the bullets and quickly falls prey to its magic, causing her to go on a rampage. Just when she was about to kill Kuesu, she quickly remembers what Yuto had said to her back in Noihara and regains her sanity. Ashamed, Himari retreats from the battle, leaving a trembling Kuesu. Late at night, Yuto asks Shizuku where Himari has been and, after being told that she went off to fight Kuesu, an unconscious and beaten Himari appears in his bedroom to Yuto's shock.
8	"Curiosity Killed the Cat"; Transliteration: "Curiosity Killed the Cat"	February 24, 2010
After nursing Himari's injuries, Yuto heads over to the hotel where Kuesu is staying to talk while Himari has Aya, a spirit messenger, vomit numerous weapons for her to pick out, to Shizuku's disgust. After receiving a warm welcome from Kuesu, Yuto explains why he refuses to join her and declines their proposed marriage. Annoyed, Kuesu slices his cheek with a dagger and nearly kills him until Yuto's Light Ferry powers sends Kuesu back towards a window, eventually falling to her death. Yuto's memories of the promise Kuesu mentioned earlier come to light, leaving him ashamed that he could not remember before, but an unscathed Kuesu appears behind him, telling him that the promise they've made was the only thing keeping her alive. After she accidentally tells Yuto about wanting to fulfill his desires, Himari appears, having heard the entire thing after the barrier Kuesu put up was broken. Kuesu, embarrassed, quickly takes back her words and Himari has Aya repeat her weapons vomiting, to both Yuto and Kuesu's disgust. Meanwhile in a forest, numerous ayakashi lie dead and mutilated while two small ayakashi run for their lives, only for them to get eaten by an ominous figure.
9	"The Cat in the Approaching Darkness"; Transliteration: "Neko naku Shinobiyoru Yami" (Japanese: 猫鳴く忍び寄る闇)	March 3, 2010
While Yuto's class is doing an art project at the park, he is kidnapped by Ageha at a power station. Himari and Rinko quickly set out to search for him, until Rinko gets a surprise visit from Sasa. Meanwhile at the water fountain, Taizo and the other students get a surprise visit from Shizuku, who wants to warn Himari of something. When Himari tells her about Yuto being kidnapped, they both prepare to look until they see a tired Rinko collapse with Sasa on her back. Himari demands Sasa of Yuto's whereabouts, eventually learning that he is with Ageha. Back at the power station, an excited Ageha drinks Yuto's blood and gets intoxicated after drinking it. Himari and Shizuku quickly intervene, both preparing to fight her, but Ageha refuses, saying that someone is trying to kill off ayakashi in western Japan. Later, a man named Kaburagi from Public Safety's Section 4 appears, and after explaining to them about the numerous cases of an ayakashi consuming other ayakashi, attempts to recruit Yuto into his division. Yuto, however, refuses when a mysterious blond-haired child appears in front of them. As Yuto and Himari run for the exit, they see a mysterious man blocking it and, after a failed series of attacks from Himari, Sasa, and Ageha, the blond-haired child attacks Himari and bites her, revealing she is the ayakashi responsible for killing other ayakashi. Kuesu later arrives at the scene, identifying the two as Tamamo-no-Mae and Shuten-doji, two of Japan's three strongest ayakashi. However, just as she was about to fight them, Tama and Shuten-doji vanish. Himari then recalls Tama's words from earlier, which leaves her worried.
10	"The Cat Demon's Feelings"; Transliteration: "Ayashiki Neko no Omoi" (Japanese: 妖しき猫の思い)	March 10, 2010
After a report from Aya about one of the lands she came across being ravaged by Tama, Ageha comes up with a plan to awaken Yuto's powers by having the girls dress in cosplay outfits, with Ageha herself wearing a revealing schoolgirl outfit. She then starts to seduce Yuto until Himari, wearing a cat costume, stops her. Later on, Himari tries out another katana from Noihara's weapon vault but is dissatisfied until Kuesu arrives with her damaged Yasutsuna, in which Ageha has Sasa repair with her eye beam. At a playground, a worried Yuto tells Rinko that he still wants to settle the conflict with Shuten-doji and Tama without having to resort to violence. Shizuku and Kaya later appear and reveals to them about Shuten-doji and Tama's origins and their agendas. At night, Yuto tells the girls that he still wants humans and ayakashi to coexist and proclaims that he will fight Shuten-doji and Tama for that cause. At the park, Kaburagi meets with Shuten-doji and Tama, who agree to Kaburagi's deal not to harm any humans during their plans. Late at night, Himari sets off for Shuten-doji and Tama only to find Yuto blocking her path. After he tells her that they have to stick together no matter what, Himari embraces him in tears and both prepare to kiss each other until Kuesu interrupts them with the other girls following suit, which later leads to a series of misunderstandings.
11	"Himari, as a Bodyguard..."; Transliteration: "Himari, Mamorigatana toshite..." (Japanese: 猫 (ひまり), 護り刀として...)	March 17, 2010
While Himari spars with Yuto in order for him to fully master his Light Ferry ability, Shuten-doji puts his plan into motion by erecting a barrier all over the city which catches their attention. As they arrive in the barrier, Tama appears and fights Yuto and the girls with Kaburagi watching from the sidelines. During the battle, Tama tries to kill Yuto by choking him, which provokes Himari to use her demon powers, but Yuto manages to snap her out of it just in time. Satisfied, Tama lets go of Yuto and retreats from the battle to Kaburagi's surprise. While taking refuge in Noihara, a surprised Yuto comes to see that the girls are finding a way to make him control his Light Ferry powers through old documents stored at the archives, which later leads Yuto into reading the documents himself to everyone's surprise. Kuesu receives a phone call from Kaburagi during which she realizes that he has betrayed them and sided with Tama and Shuten-doji; however, Kaburagi doesn't realize that his alliance with the two Akayashi will prove fatal to himself and all other humans if Yuto and his friends are destroyed. Meanwhile, during her walk in the forest, Himari is confronted by Shuten-doji and Tama and fights the latter by the lake. Finding herself at a severe disadvantage in her power level, Himari eventually unleashes her demon powers as she prepares for her final battle.
12	"Cats, Yuto, and a Maiden's Pure Heart"; Transliteration: "Neko to Yūto to Otome no Junjō" (Japanese: 猫と優人と乙女の純情)	March 24, 2010
With the battle between Tama and Himari intensifying with Himari's ayakashi transformation, Yuto and the other girls rush at the battle scene, where they are shocked at Himari's transformed appearance. The battle is quickly turned when Tama assumes her fox form and catches Himari in her jaws; however, Himari breaks free and deals a powerful blow to her, defeating her. However, after Yuto and the girls come down to see Himari, having lost all sense of reason, she attacks and quickly subdues the girls (except Ageha and Sasa who are watching from afar), leaving Yuto as the only one standing. Now that Kaburagi is of no further use to him, Shuten-doji taunts him with how he tricked Kaburagi and then casts him aside. Yuto then resorts to killing Himari with the latter's Yasutsuna, but hesitates at the last minute and embraces Himari, pleading with her to come back to him. After returning to normal, Himari and Yuto prepare to fight an enraged Shuten-doji in his oni form. Yuto then imbues Himari's Yasutsuna with his Light Ferry ability, and using her newfound power Himari defeats Shuten-doji for good, with a hungry Tama emerging from the rubble soon after. Following the fight, Kuesu asks Yuto to use his Light Ferry ability to fix her clothes, but to his surprise he can't summon his power. The next day, back at Yuto's house, Yuto gets an angry visit from Kisaragi, Taizo and the Class Rep, which leads to a huge misunderstanding after they see all of the girls in his house.

== See also ==
- List of Omamori Himari chapters
- List of Omamori Himari characters
