= Ageha =

Ageha (揚羽) is a Japanese word meaning "swallowtail butterfly". It is Taira clan's Mon.

Ageha may also refer to:

== People ==
- Ageha Ohkawa (born 1967), Japanese manga artist
- Ageha Tanigawa (born 2003), Japanese swimmer

== Fiction ==
- Ageha, the central character in the 1996 Japanese film Swallowtail Butterfly (film)
- Ageha, a character in the 2002 video game Shinobi (2002 video game)
- Ageha, a character in the video game Shinobido: Way of the Ninja
- Ageha, a character in the manga series Basara (manga)
- Ageha, the main character of the manga series Papillon (manga)
- Ageha, a character in the manga series GetBackers
- Ageha, a character in the manga series Omamori Himari; see List of Omamori Himari characters
- Ageha Hijiri, a main character from Soaring Sky! Pretty Cure
- Ageha Himegi, a character in the visual novel, If My Heart Had Wings; see If My Heart Had Wings (visual novel)
- Ageha Kuki, a character in the visual novel and anime Maji de Watashi ni Koi Shinasai!
- Ageha Kurono, a character in the manga series Rosario + Vampire; see List of Rosario + Vampire characters
- Ageha Squad, a fictitious unit in the anime series Eureka Seven; see List of Eureka Seven characters
- Ageha Yoshina, the main protagonist in the manga series Psyren
- Ageha, a character in the video game series Pop'n Music
- Ageha Woman, a character in the manga series One Piece

== Music ==
- "Ageha", a song by a Japanese rock group Tourbillon (band)
- "Ageha", a song by a Japanese singer Harumi Tsuyuzaki (also known as Lyrico)
- "Ageha", a song by a Japanese rock group Going Under Ground
- "Ageha", a song by a Japanese pop band Core of Soul
- Ageha (album), an album by a Japanese group w-inds
- Ageha, an album by a Japanese singer Yozuca
- "Ageha", a song by a Japanese rock group Mucc
- "AGEHA", a song by Ryutaro Nakahara in the game Beatmania IIDX 11 IIDXRED
- "AGEHA", a song by the Generations from Exile Tribe
- "Ageha {Prototype Edition}", an EP by Dr. Carmilla

== Other uses ==
- ageHa, a weekend club event at the Usen Studio Coast event space in Tokyo, Japan
- Koakuma Ageha, a fashion magazine dedicated to "gyaru" and hostess styles
