= List of Omamori Himari chapters =

Cover of the first tankōbon of Omamori Himari published by Fujimi Shobo on February 1, 2007, in Japan

Omamori Himari is a Japanese manga series written and illustrated by Milan Matra. The story follows Yuto Amakawa, an orphaned boy who, on the day of his sixteenth birthday, meets Himari, a sword-wielding girl who turns out to be a cat spirit. He soon discovers that his family is one of the twelve Demon Slayer families that had slain demons for hundreds of years, and that Himari has sworn an ancient oath to protect him from the demons that are out to kill him until his powers fully awaken. Throughout the series, Yuto encounters other girls who later take a romantic liking to him, most of them ayakashi: Shizuku, a mizuchi in the form of a small child, Lizlet, a tsukumogami in the form of a busty tea-serving maid, and Kuesu, the heiress of the Jinguji Family of Demon Slayers and Yuto's fiancée.

Omamori Himari began monthly serialization in the July 2006 issue of Monthly Dragon Age (released on June 9, 2006), and ran until the October 2013 issue (released September 9, 2013), spanning a total of seventy-five chapters. Twelve bound volumes were released by Fujimi Shobo from February 1, 2007, to November 9, 2013. The first five volumes were published under Kadokawa Shoten's "Dragon Jr." imprint, while the remaining volumes were published under Fujimi Shobo's "Dragon Comics Age" imprint. An official guidebook to the series (sold as Volume 0) was also released by Kadokawa Shoten on October 24, 2009. The manga was also serialized in Fujimi Shobo's paid online magazine, Age Premium, starting from the inaugural September 2011 issue (released on August 3, 2011) to the November 2013 issue.

A four-panel spinoff called Omamori Himari: Himari's Panties (おまもりひまり 緋鞠のおぱんちゅ, Omamori Himari: Himari no Opanchu), illustrated by Nikubanare, began serialization in the November 2009 issue of Monthly Dragon Age and ended in the November 2010 issue. A compilation called Omamori Himari 1/4: Himari's 4-Koma Anthology (おまもりひまり1/4 緋鞠の４こまあんそろじぃ) was released on April 9, 2010. A bonus two-part side story, called Omamori Himari: Book of the Gaiden (おまもりひまり 外伝の書, Omamori Himari: Gaiden no Sho), also illustrated by Nikubanare, was released by Kadokawa Shoten on September 9, 2011. The stories were serialized in the May 2011 and June 2011 issues of Monthly Dragon Age.

Omamori Himari is licensed in North America by Yen Press, and released all thirteen volumes (twelve plus Volume 0) from October 26, 2010, to July 22, 2014. The manga is also licensed in Taiwan by one of Kadokawa Shoten's subsidiary companies, Kadokawa Media, and in Germany by Panini Comics under the title of Talisman Himari. A 12-episode anime adaptation created by animation studio Zexcs ran between January and March 2010 on TV Saitama, Chiba TV, and other networks.

Individual chapters of the series are called Menageries (匹目, Hikime), and each chapter uses either the kanji, katakana, or hiragana for "cat" (猫, ネコ, ねこ, neko) within its title.

== Volumes list ==
No.	Original release date	Original ISBN	English release date	English ISBN
1	February 1, 2007	978-4-047-12478-3	October 26, 2010	978-0-7595-3179-6
Character sketches (Himari, Yuto, and Rinko); 01. "The Cat, the Girl, and the Allergy"; 02. "The Cat Omamori Princess"; 03. "The Cat Swordswoman"; 04. "The Tenacious Cat's Shopping Trip"; 05. "Sea Cat Scramble"; 06. "The Cat and a Drop"; Afterword by Milan Matra
2	September 9, 2007	978-4-047-12508-7	January 25, 2011	978-0-7595-3180-2
Character sketches (Shizuku, Lizlet, Ageha, Sasa, Daidarabotchi); 07. "Confused Forest Cat"; 08. "Maid in Kitty"; 09. "The Red Ribbon of the Cat-Loving Girl"; 10. "Twilight Kitty of Temptation"; 11. "Demon-Crushing Kitty"; 12. "Cat Loses Her Head, Boy Gets His Head Together"; Afterword by Milan Matra
3	April 9, 2008	978-4-047-12541-4	April 26, 2011	978-0-7595-3181-9
Character sketches (Kuesu, Kaya, Kagetsuki, Class President); 13. "The Cat of Memory and Silence"; 14. "Calm Heart of the Harried Cat"; 15. "The Boastful Counter Cat"; 16. "Kiss x Cat x <Kiss>"; 17. "The Cat's Feelings and the Witch's Melancholy"; 18. "And So the Cat Faces Off"; Bonus Comic #1: "Black, White & Black All Over"; Bonus Comic #2: "Modest Rinko"; Bonus Comic #3: "But Her Age Is Unknown"; Afterword by Milan Matra
4	November 10, 2008	978-4-047-12575-9	August 16, 2011	978-0-3161-8758-9
Character sketches (Sae, Aya, Yuko Akutsu, Rinko's Mom, Child Himari); 19. "The Kitties' Capriccio"; 20. "Cruel Kitty Paranoia"; 21. "Curiosity Killed The Cat"; 22. "The Art Cat & Memories at the Bottom of the Cliff"; 23. "Kitty Cat Phantasm"; 24. "Kitten Impossible"; Afterword by Milan Matra
5	April 9, 2009	978-4-047-12598-8	November 22, 2011	978-0-3161-9572-0
Character sketches (Ageha ver.2, Sasa ver.2, Commence Operation! characters); 25. "Lolita Kitty Strikes Back"; 26. "Blood Makes the Kitten Dance"; 27. "The Pretty Miss Kitty Festival"; 27.5. "Liz's Elegant Day...?"; 28. "The Cat Cries and the Darkness Creeps In"; Bonus Manga: Commence Operation! (状況開始っ!, Jōkyō Kaishi!); Demon Slayer Family Info; Afterword by Milan Matra
Volume 5 contains a bonus one-shot manga called Jōkyō Kaishi! (Commence Operation!), one of Matra's earlier works based on the visual novel of the same name by Kogado Studio and the first of his works to be featured in a major manga magazine. It was serialized in the February 2006 issue of Monthly Dragon Age.
0	October 24, 2009	978-4-04-712627-5	September 25, 2012	978-0-316-20941-0
Menagerie EX: "Hot Spring Cat's Paradise" (Milan Matra); TV anime character sketches; Menagerie OX: "Swimsuit Kitties' Poolside" (Milan Matra); Himari's Panties (Published Ver.) (Nikubanare (にくばなれ)); Omamori Himari Super Guide: OmaHima Chronicle (Series recap up to Vol. 5); Novella: "A Tiny Memory from One Day" (Kougetsu Mikazuki (みかづき 紅月, Mikazuki Kōgetsu)); Menagerie α: "Guarding Cat, Guarded Cat" (Shinshin (しんしん)); Menagerie β: "When the Black Witch Was Dyed Silver" (Kurohachi (黒八))
Volume 0 is a bonus volume in the manga that acts as the official guidebook to the series. Among the bonus comics are two that take place prior to the series' start: one that involves Himari and Kaya meeting Kasuri Kagamimori and her sister Hisuzu, the Demon Slayers of the Kagamimori Family, and another that chronicles Kuesu's time in England and how she gained her silvery-white hair.
6	December 19, 2009 (w/DVD ed.); January 7, 2010 (regular ed.)	978-4-047-12619-0 (w/DVD ed.); ISBN 978-4-04-712618-3 (regular ed.)	February 28, 2012	978-0-3161-9573-7
Character sketches (Hitsugi, Kasuri, Hisuzu, Ranka Mikari); 29. "An Ordinary Cat and Her Crew Nonetheless"; 30. "Then the Cat Starts Walking"; 31. "The World of Corrupt Cats"; 32. "A Gray Day, an Ever-Changing Cat"; 33. "The Night of the Cat, the Wet Snake"; 34. "Full-Throttle Afterimage, Version Cat"; 35. "Holy Night Cat's Preparation for War"; Afterword by Milan Matra
The December release of Volume 6 includes a DVD containing a promo of the anime and Christmas-themed cover art.
7	August 9, 2010	978-4-04-712680-0	May 22, 2012	978-0-316-19574-4
Character sketches (Kofuyu, Zenju, Tesuma, Rabbit Fox, Tama's adult form); 36. "Dance of the Merciless Cat"; 37. "Poem of a Cat on a Certain Winter's Day"; 37.5. "The Cats' Free Diary"; 38. "The Sharp-Clawed Cat Doesn't Look Back"; 39. "Hellcat from the Impending Future as Foretold"; 40. "The Snow Cat & the Imperfect Blizzard"; 41. "The Traveling Cat's Dusk Special"; 42. "Steamy Cat Fight☆Flashing Crimson Blade"; Afterword by Milan Matra
8	April 9, 2011	978-4-04-712712-8	August 21, 2012	978-0-316-20942-7
Character Sketches (Tama, Shuten-doji, Haru, Ginko); 43. "Steamy Cat Fight☆Super-Mobile Angel Cat"; 44. "The Cats' (Tiny) Twilight" (猫たちの（ぷち）黄昏, Nekotachi no (Puchi) Tasogare); 45. "The Cat's Test Pierces the Night" (猫の考査は夜に裂く, Neko no Kōsa wa Yoru ni Saku); 46. "The Cat Charges into the Hotbed of Demons" (伏魔殿に猫走る, Fukumaden ni Neko Hashiru); 47. "Demon Claws VS Cat Claws" (鬼爪ＶＳ猫のツメ, Onitsume VS Neko no Tsume); 48. "The Cats Flirt With the Mystic Moon" (妖月に戯れる猫たち, Yōgetsu ni Tawamureru Neko-tachi); 48.5. "The Cats' Sketchbook ☆ Media Mix" (ねこたちの自由帳☆メディアMIX, Neko-tachi no Jiyū-chō☆Media MIX); Afterword by Milan Matra
9	January 7, 2012	978-4-04-712773-9	November 20, 2012	978-0-316-22915-9
Character Sketches (Hime, Gara, Maki Tsuchimikado, Shido Tsuchimikado); 49. "Cat on a Downward Spiral" (舞い散る螺旋の猫, Maichiru Rasen no Neko); 50. "Ballad of the Mixed-Up Kitty" (交錯するねこバラッド, Kōsasku suru Neko Baraddo); 51. "Demon-Slayer Cat of the Round Table" (円卓の鬼斬り猫, Entaku no Onikiri-neko); 52. "Round Table vs. Cat" (円卓VS猫, Entaku VS Neko); 53. "Cat-Side Meeting" (ねこ端会議, Neko Hashikaigi); 54. "The Merry☆Merry-Go-Round of the Spinning Cat" (回るねこのメリー☆メリーゴーランド, Mawaru Neko no Merī☆Merī-Gō-Rando); 55. "The Twilight Cat's Dream Theater" (黄昏ねこの夢舞台, Tsaogare Neko no Yume Butai); Afterword by Milan Matra
10	August 8, 2012	978-4-04-712822-4	May 28, 2013	978-0-31-625093-1
Character Sketches (Ekou, Kurozakura, Merhi, Kaya ver. 2); 56. "The Night Breeze Blows on the Cat" (猫に吹く夜風, Neko ni Fuku Yōkaze); 57. "Water, the Cat, and the Stray House" (水とネコと迷イ家, Mizu to Neko to Mayoi Ie); 58. "The Cats' Contending Pure Lips" (ねこたちの戦うピュアLips, Nekotachi no Tatakau Pyua Rippu); 59. "Fluttering Sorceress, the Cat's Moment" (ひるがえる魔女ネコの刹那, Hirugaeru Majo-neko no Setsuna); 60. "The Cat's Small Magic Goes On" (ねこの小さな魔法をこれからも, Neko no Chiisana Mahō o Korekara mo); 61. "I Can't Go Back to the Cat that Dreams" (夢みる猫には帰れない, Yumemiru Neko ni wa Kaerenai); 62. "The Cornered Mouse Attacks the Cat" (窮鼠猫が噛む, Kyūsō Neko ga Kamu); Afterword by Milan Matra
11	March 9, 2013	978-4-04-712863-7	January 21, 2014	978-0-316-36900-8
Character sketches (Himari ver. Funeral Outfit, Tama ver. 2, Yuto ver. Maid); 63. "The Feline Ayakashi's Fangs Bare Deep" (刳る妖猫の牙, Koru Yōbyō no Kiba); 64. "The Cat was Seeking Blue Skies" (猫は青い空を探していた, Neko wa Aoi Sora o Sagashite ita); 65. "The Unchanging Witch, the Cat's Moment"停滞する魔女ネコの刹那 (Teitai suru Majo-Neko no Setsuna); 66. "The Trigger to the Cat's Accidental Firing" (暴発へのねこトリガー, Bōhatsu e no Neko Torigā); 67. "The Trigger to the End of the Cat's Confusion" (混迷終末へのねこトリガー, Konmei Shūmatsu e no Neko Torigā); 68. "One of the Broken Cat's Shadows Appears in the Mirror" (澄んだ鏡に壊れた猫の影ひとつ, Sunda Kagami ni Kowareta Neko no Kage Hitotsu); 68.5. "The Cat and Company's Sketchbook☆Revenge" (ねこたちの自由帳☆リベンジ, Neko-tachi no Jiyū-chō☆Ribenji); Afterword by Milan Matra
12	November 9, 2013	978-4-04-712935-1	July 22, 2014	978-0-316-37678-5
Character sketches; 69. "Assault Cat's HR" (アサルトネコのHR, Asaruto Neko no HR); 70. "Prompt Cat Rondo" (即発のねこロンド, Sokuhatsu no Neko Rondo); 71. "Wild Cat's Beam of Light (光芒のワイルドキャット, Kōbō no Wairudokyatto); 72. "Phantasmagoria in Cat" (Phantasmagoria in ねこ, Phantasmagoria in Neko); 73. "Phantasmagoria in White Cat" (Phantasmagoria in 白ねこ, Phantasmagoria in Shironeko); 74. "In the Cat's Ending World" (終わりゆくねこの世界にて, Owari yuku Neko no Sekai nite); 75. "The Cat, the Girl, and the Place that Leads to Tomorrow" (猫と少女と明日への場所, Neko to Shōjo to Ashita e no Basho); Extra: "The Cat & Company's Sketchbook ☆ Finale" (English release only); Afterword by Milan Matra
The English release of Vol. 12 contains all the character sketeches found under the dust jackets of the Japanese releases.

== Spin-offs ==
No.	Title	Japanese release date	Japanese ISBN
	Omamori Himari 1/4: Himari's 4-Koma Anthology (おまもりひまり1/4 緋鞠の4こまあんそろじぃ, Omamori Himari 1/4: Himari no Yonkoma Ansorojyi)	April 9, 2010	978-4-04-712662-6
A compilation of four-panel anthology comics illustrated by various authors.
	Omamori Himari: Book of the Gaiden (おまもりひまり 外伝の書, Omamori Himari: Gaiden no Sho)	September 9, 2011	978-4-04-712749-4
1. "The Pawprints of the Cat in the Far-Off Sky are Fading" (遠き空に猫のあしあと霞む, Toki Sora ni Neko no Ashiato Kasumu); 2. "The Pawprints of the Cat in the Far-Off Sky are Fading (Latter Part)" (遠き空に猫のあしあと霞む（後編）, Toki Sora ni Neko no Ashiato Kasumu (Ato Hen))
	Omamori Himari Virgin Art Book: Milan Matra Art Works (おまもりひまり 処女画集 ～MATRA MILAN Art Works～, Omamori Himari Shojo Gashū ～MATRA MILAN Art Works～)	January 9, 2014	978-4-04-712939-9
An artbook featuring art from the author's previous works. The artbook includes an extra chapter of Omamori Himari that serves as the series' epilogue. The extra chapter was later included in the English release of Volume 12.

== See also ==
- List of Omamori Himari episodes
- List of Omamori Himari characters
