= Himari Noihara =

Fictional character from Omamori Himari

- Omamori Himari character
- Himari as she first appears in the manga.
- First appearance: Manga: Omamori Himari chapter 1: "The Cat, the Girl, and the Allergy"; Anime: "Cat and Girl and Allergy"
- Created by: Milan Matra
- Voiced by: Ami Koshimizu

In-universe information
- Species: Bakeneko

Himari Noihara (Japanese: 野井原緋鞠, Hepburn: Noihara Himari) or Himari for short, is a fictional character in the manga series Omamori Himari, created by Milan Matra. She also appears in the anime adaptation where she is voiced by Ami Koshimizu. Himari's character design was created simply, but Matra became bogged down on other things such as naming of the main heroine. In the story, Himari is shown to be a bakeneko or demon cat, a type of Japanese spirit known as a yōkai. Reception of her character by English-language media has been mostly positive with writers often calling her a good lead character based on her traits.

In both the anime and manga series she is the descendant of a yōkai that was spared rather than being killed by a demon slayer family. As a result, she and her ancestors have sworn to protect its members. Yuto Amakawa, being the current heir to the family, is thus under her care. As the series progresses she shows that she deeply cares for and loves Yuto, but struggles with demons within herself. At the end of the series, Yuto saves Himari and confesses his love back to her. The anime differs from the manga when it comes to the final battle at the end.

== Creation and conception ==
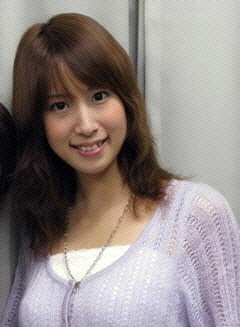
Himari is voiced by Ami Koshimizu in the anime.

When creating Himari, author Milan Matra opted to go for an easily drawn character. He soon came up with her design, but became stuck in regards to her name and her style of speech. Eventually he decided on the name Himari and an old-fashioned speech style. Himari was originally going to have short hair in the final chapter but Matra decided to go with long hair, and use the short haired designs for her evil side, Black Himari, which appears earlier in the series. Matra describes Himari's appearance on the cover of the first volume as the "first he had ever done". In order to attract readers, Matra stated that he drew Himari in a way that was unusual for her character whom is usually serious. He described her smile as "gentle" which is something that would never be seen in the story itself.

Himari also has a sister named Hime who was originally going to be a male character. Matra made the change saying that he did not want his readers to wrap their hearts around two different male characters which would have also impacted Himari's storyline. When asked at a book fair in Taiwan why he chose a cat to represent the main character, Matra replied that he thinks that cats in general are cute. In the story, Himari states that her mother died while giving birth to her while her father might have been another species of demon cat, or possibly a stray.

Himari's character is voiced by Ami Koshimizu in the anime adaptation. She was chosen for the role during a series of interviews, then was photographed along with the other chosen cast for promotional shots. Koshimizu described her feelings about Himari in another interview when asked what she liked best. She said that while Himari has great mental abilities and can fight, she is still a girl who cares about various things. Koshimizu went on to say that it was difficult to "add or subtract" Himari's feelings about being a yōkai. In addition to voicing Himari, Koshimizu also sings the ending song called BEAM my BEAM after each episode.

== Appearances ==
=== In the manga ===
Himari first appears in chapter one of the manga "The Cat, The Girl, and The Allergy". After saving Yuto from an ayakashi, she later introduces herself to him and explains that he comes from a family of demon slayers. She goes on to say that at some point one of the members of his family spared and tamed one of her ancestors, choosing compassion rather than reward, and as a result she vows to protect him. Himari soon takes on the last name "Noihara" in order to blend in more, Yuto comments that the name is the area from where his grandparents were from. Aside from the ancestor reasoning, Himari shows strong feelings towards Yuta, asking him out on a date and letting him choose her clothing among other things. It is later revealed that Himari was an important person to Yuto during his childhood which helps their relationship grow.

Being a yōkai, Himari finds herself torn between her desire to protect Yuto, and her nature as a bloodthirsty demon cat. Through research, Shizuku informs Yuto that Himari's ancestors were the type of evil yōkai that killed and ate humans, saying that Himari takes pleasure in the hunt and loses herself to the bloodlust. Initially, Himari does not realize when she loses control, describing it as if her heart was swallowed up into a black pool. Himari eventually acknowledges that she is a beast after a fight with Kuesu, but she is tended to by Yuto. In response Himari kisses him, saying that it is a "gift of mercy" for letting her stay by his side. Towards the end of the series in the fight against Tamamo-no-Mae, Himari bites her, absorbing most of her demonic powers. This results in Himari losing control of her darker demonic half, which eventually becomes visible to those around her. The series ends after Yuto enters into Himari's subconscious, and saves her before her darker half takes full control of her heart.

=== In the anime ===
Himari's appearance in the anime follows that of the manga with the difference being the ending. She first appears in episode one "Cat and Girl and Allergy", where, as in the manga, she saves Yuto from an ayakashi and explains to him who she is and why she is protecting him. The ending of the anime differs from the manga when it comes to the final battle. Tama the nine-tailed fox is defeated by Himari, who chose to give in to her darkness (her vicious ayakashi side/energy) while fighting her. Yuto hugs Himari, turning her back to her good self, and uses his light ferry to turn her into "Super Himari". With this added power, Himari goes to defeat Shuten-douji and wins, ending the anime after a characters reunion. When referring to Himari in the anime, distributor Kadokawa describes her character as old-fashioned with a demonic nature, who likes to snuggle.

== Reception ==
Reception of Himari's character in English-language media has been mostly positive. T.H.E.M. Anime Reviews called Himari an okay character when she is not threatening Yuto or getting upset at the other girls that he has around him. While referencing the anime adaptation, Erin Finnegan from Anime News Network called the character designs in general "solid", aside from Yuto. Paul Jensen, also from Anime News Network said that Himari is a good "demon girl with a dark side" heroine character. Jensen did say though that the overall character designs are starting to show their age seven years after the series' first release. Chris Beveridge from Mania reviewed the third volume of the manga series which included a glimpse into her character. In the review he describes Himari's kiss scene in which she wants to experience what a kiss is like for the first time. Chris commented; "There's a pleasant innocence about her as she works through it and finds the situation turning to her favor for actually trying it". In contrast, Ross Liversidge of UK Anime Network reviewed the first volume of the manga in which he called Himari's character overly "stereotyped". Ross also said that although she is "kick-ass" while using her sword, she has no idea about modern life. Chris Kincaid from Japan Powered called Himari's anime appearance "interesting". In his review he compares her character to Inuyasha's manga title character as she has a protector mentality, but is "torn between the human world and her demon nature".

== See also ==
- Ayakashi (yōkai)
- Japanese folklore
- List of Omamori Himari characters
