= Shizuku =

Shizuku (滴 or 雫) means "droplet". It may refer to:

== Characters ==
- Shizuku, in the eroge video game Popotan
- Shizuku (Hunter × Hunter), in the manga and anime series Hunter × Hunter
- Shizuku (Omamori Himari), in the manga and anime series Omamori Himari
- Shizuku, in Dead or Alive Xtreme Venus Vacation
- Shizuku, the alias of Airi Sakura from Classroom of the Elite
- Shizuku Fuji, in Battle Arena Toshinden 3
- Shizuku Hazuki, in New Game!
- Shizuku Hinomori (日野森 雫), in the video game Hatsune Miku: Colorful Stage!
- Shizuku Kitayama, in the light novel and anime The Irregular at Magic High School
- Shizuku Mizutani, in the manga My Little Monster
- Shizuku Mizuki, in the video game Chaos Wars
- Shizuku Mizuori, in the visual novel Summer Pockets
- Shizuku Osaka (桜坂 しずく), in the media project Nijigasaki High School Idol Club
- Shizuku Sakurai, in the anime and manga Candy Boy
- Shizuku Sangou, in the manga and anime Kämpfer
- Shizuku Tsukushima, in the manga and anime Mimi wo Sumaseba
- Shizuku Yaegashi (八重樫雫), in the light novel series Arifureta: From Commonplace to World's Strongest
- Shizuku Yamabushi, in Yuki Yuna is a Hero

== Other ==
- Shizuku (song), a song by Japanese metal band Esprit D'Air
- Shizuku (video game), a Japanese adult visual novel by Leaf
- Shizuku-chan, a Japanese manga and anime series
- Shizuku, an album by the Japanese rock band Kagrra
- Shizuku, the nickname for the GCOM-W satellite, part of the Global Change Observation Mission
- "Shizuku", a 2020 song by @onefive from 1518
