= Šolontu =

Šolontu (ᡧᠣᠯᠣᠨᡨᡠ)
- Gender: Male

Origin
- Origin: Manchu
- Meaning: "horned dragon"

Šolontu (Manchu: ᡧᠣᠯᠣᠨᡨᡠ, Möllendorff: šolontu, Hu: sholontu, Abkai: xolontu) is a Manchu masculine given name meaning "Qiulong (simplified Chinese: 虬龙; traditional Chinese: 虯龍; pinyin: qíulóng)" or "small-horned dragon". Alternative spelling or transliterations, such as Solontu (Manchu: ᠰᠣᠯᠣᠨᡨᡠ, romanized: solontu), Xolontu, and Sholontu, are also existed.

== See also ==
- Manchu given name
