= List of Omamori Himari characters =

The main characters of Omamori Himari (from left to right):Yuto Amakawa, Himari Noihara, Rinko Kuzaki (top row); Shizuku, Lizlet L. Chelsie, and Kuesu Jinguji (bottom row).

The manga and anime series Omamori Himari features an extensive cast of characters by Milan Matra. The series' storyline focuses on Yuto Amakawa, an orphan who, on the day of his sixteenth birthday, meets Himari, a buxom sword-wielding girl and a cat spirit. Yuto later learns that he is a Demon Slayer and that his family is one of the twelve Demon Slayer families that had slain demons for hundreds of years, and that Himari had sworn an oath set by their ancestors to protect him until his powers awaken. Throughout the series, Yuto, along with his childhood friend Rinko, later encounter other girls who soon take a liking to Yuto: Shizuku, a mizuchi, Lizlet, an artifact spirit and Kuesu Jinguji, an heiress to the Jinguji Family of Demon Slayers who is revealed to be Yuto's fiancée.

== Main characters ==
Yuto Amakawa (天河 優人, Amakawa Yūto)
Voiced by: Daisuke Hirakawa, Mina (child)
Yuto is the main protagonist of the series. He is a student at Touryou High School in Takamiya City, and is the sole descendant of the Amakawa Family (天河家, Amakawa Ke; ranked #6^{[ch. 34]}), one of the twelve Demon Slayer families who had fought and slain ayakashi for hundreds of years. His parents died in a car crash when he was eight years old and he fell into a deep depression when he arrived in Takamiya until Rinko helped him out of it.^{[ch. 4]} He also has a terrible cat allergy, which would cause his eyes to water and his nose to run as well as causing him to sneeze uncontrollably whenever he is near one (revealed to be Kuesu's doing^{[ch. 19]}, but later when Kuesu dies from Shuten-douji's fatal attack, she purifies Yuto. As a result, Yuto's no longer allergic to cats).

Yuto spent most of his childhood with his grandparents in Noihara, and shared a close bond with Himari when she was a cat.^{[ch. 10,11]} He also had a close friendship with Kuesu Jinguji, who would later be his fiancée^{[ch. 15,16,17,21]}. However, due to the strong protection spell placed in the amulet that his grandmother gave to him (an omamori), most of his childhood memories were erased,^{[ch. 10]} though they were later regained after his visit to his grandparents' home and his reunion with Kuesu.^{[ch. 10,11,15,21]} He is usually portrayed with a friendly and caring demeanor, but he can be shy and nervous in perverted situations or harem acts, most of the time with Himari. Yuto has also been shown to be acrophobic, which resulted from his childhood when he tried to climb a tree to get to Himari only for him to fall each time and when he fell from a cliff during a trek through the mountains back to his grandparents' house, at which he suffered some emotional trauma after Himari passed out using her demon powers to call for help and remained unconscious for three days.^{[ch. 22]} Upon learning of his family's Demon Slayer heritage, he is initially dismayed, repeatedly declaring that he has no intention of fighting. This later changes after he witnesses Himari's demon side in Noihara and during the Christmas Eve incident followed by Shuten-douji and Tama's appearance, as he soon realizes that he needs to start fighting to preserve his way of peace, thus prompting him to officially accept his Demon Slayer mantle.

As a descendant of the Amakawa Family, Yuto has the power of the Light Ferry (光渡し, Hikari-watashi), an ability that imbues ordinary objects (such as a pole or branch) with light-based energy, turning them into powerful melee weapons equivalent to that of a legendary blade. He can also imbue other weapons, shield himself from harm, and enhance his physical senses with it, one instance is when he imbued Himari's Yasutsuna to defeat Shuten-douji. He can also use it to trap other enemies as well as explained by Hitsugi, once doing so against Tesuma.^{[ch. 39]} In order for him to control the Light Ferry, Yuto must keep a calm mind and have good composure. Prior to having some control over it, the Light Ferry ability only emerged when Yuto was in a near-death situation.^{[ch. 12,21]} Although the Amakawa Family is a higher-ranking family, they were not well liked by the other Demon Slayer families due to their association with ayakashi. In addition, the Light Ferry power has only been descended to the male half of the family.^{[ch. 18]}

Himari Noihara (野井原緋鞠, Noihara Himari)
Voiced by: Ami Koshimizu
Himari is a bakeneko, a shapeshifting demon cat, and the female protagonist of the series. She appears to Yuto as his bodyguard to protect him from the ayakashi out of an ancient oath set by her ancestor who was spared by one of the heads of the Amakawa family after he refused to kill her.^{[ch. 2]} She is known to other ayakashi as the Crimson Blade of Noihara (野井原の緋剣, Noihara no Hiken) due to her expert swordsmanship, and refers to herself as the "sword that protects" (護り刀, mamorigatana) Yuto. She is usually seen wearing traditional Japanese clothes (when not in her school uniform) and always wears her hair in a long ponytail with a large pink bow to hold it in place, and uses keigo in her speech. She is very close to Yuto, whom she refers to as "Young Lord" (若殿, Wakadono), and is sometimes philosophical, worried that Yuto will kill her when his abilities awaken.^{[ch. 13]} However, she is deeply in love with him, as she wants to be with him as a person, and is very flirtatious with him because she and Yuto got along well in Noihara in the past when she was a white cat. This flirting often annoys Rinko to no end. In the anime, Himari is one of the only people to have kissed Yuto (the other being Kuesu). Despite this, she is also very serious about her duty as a bodyguard, and is willing to protect Yuto from harm by any means.

In the final episode of anime series, Himari voluntarily gives her heart in to the darkness inside of her to fight Tama at her full strength, assuming a demonic form called Ayakashi Himari (妖緋鞠). Aside from the physical changes (white hair, pale skin with black markings, red claws, and a bushier tail), Himari also gains the ability to perform powerful claw swipes from a distance in addition to her increased demon powers, but the loss of her personality makes her a deadly killing machine, unable to distinguish friend from foe. After she was restored by Yuto and Shuten-dōji assumes his Oni form, Yuto imbues her Yasutsuna with his Light Ferry ability, allowing her to assume a powered-up form called Super Himari (スーパー緋鞠, Sūpā Himari), which consists of her wearing revealing samurai-like garments. As Super Himari, she gains the ability of levitation and can slice the strongest of demons in two with a single blow.

As a bakeneko, Himari can shapeshift from human to cat (the latter in which she can also talk in) and she can also reveal her cat ears and tail while in her human form (though this triggers Yuto's allergies while doing so). She also has superhuman speed, strength, and endurance (all of which surpasses Rinko, who was the school's top athlete prior^{[ch. 2]}, and she is extremely agile due to her cat-like nature. She is armed with Yasutsuna (安綱, lit. "Gentle Crane"), a katana crafted in the Heian period that was handed down to her by Yuto's grandfather and the legendary blade that defeated Shuten-douji in the past,^{[ch. 24]} and is almost never seen without it (its blade was burned in chapters 18–29 of the manga and episodes 7–10 of the anime following her duel with Kuesu). Himari is also proficient with other bladed weapons as well, once using a scythe against Ageha in the anime, and she is also skilled in close-range combat.^{[ch. 30]} Because she is a cat, however, she shares some of their natural instincts as well, such as having a fear of water (Rinko speculates that Himari is afraid of deep water), water in quantity^{[ch. 5]}), a penchant for seafood,^{[ch. 15]} and being very sensitive to winter temperatures.^{[28. ,40]} Also, due to her ayakashi nature, she becomes weakened whenever she is near a Shinto shrine (to the point where even a stone can knock her out, as shown by Rinko during the summer festival^{[ch. 9]}).

When Himari loses her sanity during a fight, she goes on a berserker rampage, which is depicted by her having red eyes, an uncontrollable bloodlust, and (in the anime only) a dark aura surrounding her body. Also, Himari loses all rational thought, becoming a mindless killing machine bent on hunting and killing anything that moves, which Shizuku states is part of her kind's true nature. Shizuku also warns Yuto that there is a much higher risk of Himari reverting to her kind's killer instincts should she continue to fight.^{[ch. 13]} Rinko's nickname for Himari is "Cat Princess" (猫姫, Neko-hime), while Shizuku and Kuesu simply refer to her as "Cat" (猫, Neko) (or in Kuesu's case, "Demon Cat").

Rinko Kuzaki (九崎 凛子, Kuzaki Rinko)
Voiced by: Iori Nomizu
Rinko is Yuto's tomboyish childhood friend and next-door neighbor. She had a very close friendship with Yuto, as she helped him out of his depression when he first moved to Takamiya and cried along with him when his parents died.^{[ch. 9]} She also has feelings for Yuto until Himari and the other girls appeared, causing her to display a tsundere personality as a result of their constant flirting. She also suffers from an inferiority complex from their well-endowed breasts (sans Shizuku). She is also a remarkable athlete, excelling at nearly every sport at her school.

Rinko always tends to ruin every romantic or perverted moment Yuto has with another girl by hitting him with her signature nail bat (or any other object she could find) despite the fact that he had nothing to do with it in the first place. However, despite all of this, she still wants to support Yuto to the very end even if he does become a full-fledged Demon Slayer, believing that she is the only person good for him due to their long relationship and that all he ever wanted was a normal life. Rinko is always seen wearing two red ribbons in her hair; a tradition involving them is that, every year during a summer festival, Yuto would buy her a new pair for her to wear year round and she would tie last year's ribbons to a treebranch.^{[ch. 9]} She owns a pet cat named Ranmaru (蘭丸).^{[ch. 1]}

Shizuku (静水久)
Voiced by: Kei Shindō
Shizuku is a mizuchi, a water deity (traditionally depicted as a dragon) who is introduced in chapter 5 of the manga (she had a brief cameo in chapter 3 prior). She assumes the form of a green-haired child with red eyes, looking like a drowning victim just pulled out of the water, abnormally pale, cold to the touch and dripping wet, (Note: In chapter 24, when Shizuku appeared out of a lake during a class art trip, one of the students pointed out that she bears a resemblance to Sadako Yamamura from the Ring Trilogy^{[ch. 24]}) and has a cold-fish personality to match her appearance. Her demeanor can quickly change to a murderous grin when her desire to kill emerges. She first appears to Yuto at a nearby lake in the forest where Himari was killing other ayakashi, warning him to deviate from his Demon Slayer heritage or face death, and then disappearing.^{[ch. 3]} Later on, after witnessing Yuto's resolve to save Himari from her water whirlpool during her fight with the latter, she becomes puzzled about him and, in an attempt to understand him more, invites herself to live in his house, flirting with him on multiple occasions.^{[ch. 7]} She is shown to have developed feelings for Yuto and also tends to show signs of jealousy when another girl flirts with him. Her family was killed by the Jibashiri Family of Demon Slayers 100 years prior to the series' start, and she bears a grudge against them as a result.^{[ch. 5,31]} However, she lets go of it following an intervention from Yuto and Himari after meeting one of their descendants. She often ends her sentences with na no (〜なの; lit. "You know"), and her name is a homonym for a drop of water (albeit with different Kanji).

As a mizuchi, Shizuku can manipulate water and ice and use it as a weapon or a shield, even using it to heal the wounds of others, once doing so with Yuto after Himari's battle with Ageha.^{[ch. 13]} However, if the water is mixed, such as with another ayakashi's blood, she cannot control it.^{[ch. 5]} She can also regenerate her body after being sliced in two,^{[ch. 6]} and her hair extends whenever her desire to kill emerges.^{[ch. 16,33]} She is also very sensitive to variations in temperature, as she is cold-blooded, and needs to cool down in the summer by eating shaved ice or other frozen treats and needs to warm up in the winter by staying in warm places (such as hiding in a kotatsu).^{[ch. 5,37,40]} She can also extend her snake-like tongue to abnormal lengths.^{[ch. 8,14,18,34,37]} She claims that her kind were excellent housekeepers prior to the Demon Slayers' arrival, and as a result is very adept at cooking and cleaning.^{[ch. 8]} She is often referred to as "lolita snake", "Loli-snake", or simply "snake" by other female characters, namely Rinko, Himari, and Kuesu.

Lizlet L. Chelsie (リズリット・L・チェルシー, Rizuritto L. Cherushī), nicknamed Liz (リズ, Rizu)
Voiced by: Asuka Ōgame
Lizlet is a tsukumogami, an inanimate object that comes to life, who first appeared in chapter 8 of the manga. (Note: Liz made a cameo appearance at the end of chapter 7, passing out flyers while Yuto and Himari were in town^{[ch. 7]}) Her true form is an antique teacup, while she frequently appears as a busty blonde girl with blue eyes wearing a maid's outfit. She came to Japan from Britain (specifically, Edinburgh^{[ch. 27.5]}) a hundred years ago, and works as a waitress at Café Relish (カフェ・リリッシュ, Kafe Ririsshu), a popular maid café where she also resides in an apartment on the building's second floor. Liz is a self-proclaimed "Tea Sprite" due to her expertise with it (to the extent of having a garden that contains numerous types of tea leaves^{[ch. 27.5]}) and adheres to the maids' code of conduct. When Liz got suspicious of Yuto's constant watching during his first visit to the café, she believed that he was an exorcist trying to kill her with Himari as his accomplice. Fearing for her life, she spiked his tea with poisonous tea leaves, which was soon foiled by Shizuku tasting it (in the anime, it makes whoever drinks it to leave her café). After her true identity was discovered during her fight with Himari, she tried to protect her real body from breaking but failed to recover it after Himari lost her grip on it until Yuto caught it at the last minute, saving her. Soon after the misunderstanding was cleared, Liz took an intense liking to Yuto and fell in love with him, seeing him as her "significant other" and "Master" (to the others' annoyance), and flirts with him every time he comes to visit. Later on, she suggests that she starts serving him "Milk Tea", in which she hugs her breasts every time she says it, suggesting she means her breast milk.^{[ch. 14,41]} She has a pacifist nature and gets intimidated easily when she sees someone powerful, often resulting in her being the series' comic relief.

Liz can use her magic tea leaves to attack her opponents as well as defend herself when needed,^{[ch. 8]} and is shown to have feats of superhuman strength, once managing to throw Yuto at a very high altitude without much stress during his "training session".^{[ch. 14]} Because her human body is an illusion, she is immune to any damage caused by a bladed weapon, where it would just regenerate at the site of damage (her body, not her clothes).^{[ch. 8]} She can also teleport from a limited range as long as her teacup is present.^{[ch. 14,41]} However, because Liz's human body is symbiotic to her real body, she feels whatever the teacup is feeling, meaning that if the teacup breaks, her human body will also suffer the same fate. This was demonstrated in one of the manga's side chapters when Himari rubs and licks her teacup while she was sleeping, causing Liz to feel the same effects as a result,^{[ch. 27.5]} and in another side chapter when Yuto (mistakenly) drinks from her teacup, giving Liz the feeling of having Cunnilingus.^{[ch. 48.5]}

Kuesu Jinguji (神宮寺 くえす, Jingūji Kuesu)
Voiced by: Yuki Matsuoka
Kuesu is the heiress of the Jinguji Family (神宮寺家, Jingūji Ke; ranked #12), a Demon Slayer family that uses Western dark magic, who made her first appearance in chapter 15 of the manga. She is Yuto's fiancée, claiming that both of their families had promised their future marriage, and dresses in Gothic Lolita fashion. She is condescending towards ayakashi and, unlike Yuto, is fully trained in her Demon Slayer heritage. She is very arrogant and haughty as a result of her upbringing, and is shown to be highly aggressive and assertive, once kissing Yuto twice in front of Himari during her debut to stake her claim.^{[ch. 15,16]} She also has an enduring rivalry with Himari over Yuto, which stems from their first encounter in Noihara when she told Himari to stay away from him, and made Yuto allergic to cats with her magic so Himari couldn't get close to him.^{[ch. 18]} Prior to leaving for England to study magic, she and Yuto made a promise together to fight ayakashi, which was forgotten due to the magic in Yuto's amulet.^{[ch. 21]} Like the other girls, she, too has feelings for Yuto, but due to him befriending ayakashi, which to her is contradictory to his duties as a Demon Slayer, she often displays yandere traits. She slowly begins to accept the ayakashi siding with Yuto as her comrades, though this does not change her views about them should they betray him.

Kuesu is on unfriendly terms with the other Demon Slayer families, as her family was looked down upon by them and the ayakashi as heretics and outcasts for using Western magic. The only Demon Slayer family that didn't look down to them, however, was the Amakawa Family. Because they were one of the higher-ranking families, the Jinguji Family tried to make allies with them through marriage (even Himari speculates it as a well-thought idea^{[ch. 18]}). One of Kuesu's notable features is the crescent-shaped mark on her forehead, similar to the one that often appears on Sailor Moon's Usagi Tsukino. Because of this and her relentless killing of ayakashi, she is given the infamous title of Twilight Moon (黄昏の月, Tasogare no Tsuki). She also gained some infamous nicknames such as Crowley's Daughter (クロウリーの娘, Kurōrī no Musune), Second Marginal (セカンド・マージナル, Sekando Mājinaru), and The Smiling Cluster Bomb (微笑むクラスターボム, Hohoemu Kurasutā Bomu).^{[ch. 18]} Another notable feature is her silver hair: originally black, it changed color while she was studying abroad in England as a result of being exposed to and absorbing all the knowledge of a forbidden tome containing infinite knowledge (another student had pretended to befriend her in order to use her to gain the forbidden knowledge for herself and her sect; Kuesu gained the knowledge, but all of the sect members were either killed or lost their souls in the process). The reason the tome was forbidden is that everyone else who tried to acquire the knowledge it contained died from various reasons, such as their heads exploding.

As a descendant of the Jinguji Family, Kuesu can cast various magic spells through her spellbook, though she can easily cast these spells without it. During their fight, she told Himari after losing her spellbook (Himari had made a grave error in believing that the book was the source of her magic) that her spellbook didn't act as a talisman or focus to enable or enhance her spells, but was in fact a limiter to decrease her enormous power (so she would do less damage to the area such as making just a small crater where her target stood as opposed to wiping out most of the hill they were on).^{[ch. 14]} She also has the ability to teleport and wields a Stechkin APS machine pistol loaded with magic bullets as her personal sidearm.^{[ch. 14,33]} Similar to the Amakawa Family's power, the Jinguji Family's dark magic has only been passed down to female members of the family.^{[ch. 18]}

== Ayakashi ==
Ayakashi (妖) are the demons and spirits based on Japanese mythology and folklore. They once coexisted with the humans until the Demon Slayers arrived and killed most of them. As a result, the surviving ayakashi bear a deep hatred towards the Demon Slayers. Some ayakashi, like Himari and Shizuku, can assume human forms to blend in with society (though Himari comments that most do not like human cities^{[ch. 4]}), and some ayakashi can cast barriers and spells using their yōki (妖力, lit. "Demon Energy").

Among the ayakashi are three powerful ayakashi known as Japan's Three Evil Demons (日本三大悪妖怪, Nihon Sandai Aku Yōkai), consisting of Shuten-douji, Tama, and Emperor Sutoku, the latter who has yet to appear in the series. They were sealed by humans in ancient times and parts of them were spread throughout Japan in fragments until it was broken by Tama's awakening and Shuten-dōji's revival. It remains unclear if Emperor Sutoku has been freed after the seal was broken. Although the majority of ayakashi in Omamori Himari serve as antagonists, there are some who serve as allies.

=== Major ayakashi ===
Tamamo-no-Mae (玉藻前)
Voiced by: Kaoru Mizuhara
Known by her pet name Tama (タマ), she is a golden nine-tailed fox and the main antagonist of the series. First appearing in chapter 28 of the manga, assuming the guise of a small child, she is a very powerful ayakashi despite her appearance. Because she is not as powerful as she was before she was sealed, she eats other ayakashi to restore her yōkai powers and seems to have an insatiable appetite for them, once devouring an entire countryside of them in her first appearance. When she first tried to eat Himari (to be specific, her breasts), she states that she wasn't delicious because she was holding back her true nature, and as such, sends numerous ayakashi in an attempt to compel Himari to show her true power, which almost succeeded during the Christmas Eve fight.^{[ch. 36]} She is portrayed as a quiet girl who rarely speaks, having Shuten-dōji speak for her on most occasions, and is always seen eating something, be it another ayakashi or some sweets. In the anime, she is defeated by Himari in her ayakashi form but survives and is last seen in Yuto's house eating lunch with the other girls.

Tama has the ability to levitate, use telekinesis to move large objects or trap her opponents, and can generate force fields powerful enough to break a single sword on impact. In chapters 40-43 of the manga, she assumes an adult form (later revealed to be her true form in a later chapter according to her conversation with Rinko^{[ch. 54]}) while Yuto and the others were temporarily residing in a ski resort owned by Kofuyu, where she showed a sexual interest in Yuto.^{[ch. 40,41,42,43]} She is significantly more powerful in this form and is able to generate large amounts of yōki enough to overpower Himari and the others, though because of her current state she is vulnerable to powerful attacks, such as the case with Himari through the teamwork of Yuto and the others.^{[ch. 43]}

In chapter 62 after witnessing Shuten-douji's death, she goes on a full rampage, which eventually backfires after Himari consumes almost all her power. Eventually, it is revealed that due to either Himari consuming Tama's powers or due to the shock of witnessing Himari's true form, she lost all her memories and her mind reverted to an infantile state^{[ch. 62]}.

In the anime when she changes into her full fox form, a large ring with nine smaller rings appears around her neck, with the flame inside of each ring representing the number of tails she has. She does not take such a form in the manga (as of Volume 10), instead taking on a form similar to Himari's, sporting fox ears and nine tails. (Note: Tama briefly assumes this form in the last episode of the anime in her final dual against Himari.)

Shuten-douji (酒呑童子, Shuten-dōji)
Voiced by: Masami Kikuchi
A powerful Oni ruler from ancient times who met his end by Minamoto no Raikō at Ōeyama (according to legend, he was tricked into drinking some poison sake, then was beheaded by Minamoto's sword, Yasutsuna). He swears vengeance against the human race following this incident after he was awakened by Tama's yōki, and is condescending towards them as a result, finding them in modern times weak and pathetic. Because he is incomplete, he uses Tama's yōki from the ayakashi she devours to help regain his power so he can have his revenge. Appearing as a well-dressed young man, he is a very powerful demon that is agile and fast enough to sense the presence of incoming attacks.^{[ch. 28]} Tama is usually seen riding on his shoulder and he usually does most of the talking for her. He also has a tendency to chat with his enemies during fights.

In the anime after Tama was defeated by Himari's ayakashi form, he planned to use Himari to put the human race in a state of fear, only to have that foiled when Yuto brought her back to normal and soon met his end by being incapacitated and sliced in two by Super Himari after he assumed his Oni form.

In the manga, he faces Kuesu in a one-on-one duel, which ended with him fatally injuring her but ends up losing his physical body in the process after receiving a powerful blast from the latter. He later appears in his spiritual form, taking a fatal blow from Himari that was meant for Tama and telling Tama to retreat and they will meet each other again before disappearing.^{[ch. 62]}

=== Minor ayakashi ===
Kaya (加耶)
Voiced by: Mariko Honda
A Zashiki-warashi who lives at and looks after Yuto's grandparents' house. She is very fond of Himari, as she once lived with her when Yuto's grandparents were alive, but does not like Yuto due to the fact that she is very jealous of him and blames him for Himari leaving her.^{[ch. 10]} She is usually seen either cleaning up the house or reading books and scrolls in the storehouse. Kaya once provided Shizuku with the Amakawa's family records, which held information about the family itself and Himari's ancestors, at the latter's request,^{[ch. 10]} and (in the anime only) provided Yuto and Rinko brief information about Shuten-dōji and Tama's origins. She can generate a force field around herself and other people in her vicinity to repel enemy attacks. Starting from chapter 56, she joins the fight against Tama in the appearance of a ninja.

Ageha (明夏羽)
Voiced by: Chiaki Takahashi
A Hinoenma (ja:飛縁魔), who feeds off the blood of men like a vampire, who attempted to kill Yuto and Himari in Noihara in chapters 10–12 of the manga. However, after Yuto is seriously wounded by her with an attack that was meant for Himari, she is almost killed by the latter during her demon rampage until Yuto intervened with the awakening of the Light Ferry. After the incident, she begins to display tsundere traits (Rinko speculates that her current situation is similar to Shizuku's, in which she loses the intent to kill Yuto but still goes after him^{[ch. 25]}) and later reappears in chapter 24 to kidnap Yuto and drink his blood under a bridge. However, she found herself so intoxicated by it that she actually tried to violate him until Himari and Shizuku intervened. After Sasa stops the fight at Rinko's request, she leaves with him, but not before warning Yuto that she will drink his blood next time.

In the anime adaptation, she becomes a supporting character following Shuten-dōji and Tama's appearance. Her anime incarnation portrays her as being more perverse towards Yuto following their first encounter in Noihara, as she once made Yuto grope her breasts during their second encounter, dressed in a revealing schoolgirl outfit in an attempt to awaken Yuto's powers (which was an idea of hers), and once attempted to drink Yuto's blood while the latter was sleeping only to find that he was outside with Himari (which she says is a euphemism for sex).

Ageha's main outfit is modelled after those worn by mikos, with the addition of wearing boots and a beret-like hat. During her second appearance in Takamiya, she swaps her miko outfit for modern-day clothing, wearing a violet tube top underneath a tan jacket, a miniskirt, silver and black boots, and violet sunglasses. She can stretch her limbs to unimaginable lengths^{[ch. 26]} and hypnotize her victims with her eyes.^{[ch. 25]} She can increase her powers by drinking the blood of a Demon Slayer, but the blood itself must have enough time to mix in properly; if she uses too much power while it is still mixing, she will be paralyzed for a short period, such as the case during her fight with Himari when the latter was turned into a child.^{[ch. 26]} She wields a single-edged sword modeled after a kunai as her personal weapon, which was broken in the anime by Tama's force field when Himari wielded it.

Sasa (沙砂)
Voiced by: Mayako Nigo
An ippon-datara (ja:一本だたら), a monopedal cyclops-like demon that lives in mountains. He is Ageha's accomplice that attacked Shizuku, Kaya, and Rinko at Yuto's grandparents' house, but was defeated and captured by Shizuku. In his second appearance, he assumes a bipedal form with androgynous features.^{[ch. 24]} After Rinko took him out to eat ice cream at Café Relish, he stopped the fight between Ageha and Himari at her request. Sasa can summon giant pillars from the sky to crush his opponents, increase his mass at will, and fire energy beams from his eye. However, because of his androgynous appearance, he is originally mistaken for a girl, especially since in Chapter 24 he is wearing a skirt (according to him, trousers would interfere with his changing back into his monopedal form). It is mentioned by Ageha in the anime that his kind are excellent swordsmiths and as such, can repair and restore broken swords to their original condition and strength.

Sasa's anime incarnation portrays him as bipedal and his gender has been changed to a girl. Also, like Ageha, he/she becomes a supporting character following Shuten-dōji and Tama's appearance, and plays a key role in restoring Himari's Yasutsuna by shooting it with his/her eye, something that was originally done by Kuesu in the manga by recreating it through some sort of time magic.

Kagetsuki (影月)
A Kasha, a cat-like monster that steals and devours the corpses of criminals, with his human form bearing a strong resemblance to L Lawliet from Death Note. Appearing in chapter 16 of the manga when he rescues Shizuku from her fight with Kuesu, he becomes Yuto, Himari and Shizuku's informant. He is one of the monsters that likes to be an ally to Yuto due to his kindness, leading to a time that he once killed an ayakashi for Yuto right after Yuto awakened his Light Ferry power, saying that Yuto was not yet ready to fight monsters.^{[ch. 22]} Aside from his human form bearing a physical resemblance to "L", he also has the same personality as the latter, being calm, smart, having good composure, and being quiet most of the time. His name means "Shadow Moon".

Aya (文)
Voiced by: Mami Kosuge
A fugurama-yōbi (ja:文車妖妃), a spirit messenger, working under Kaya's wing. Her original form is a magical envelope that can be used to summon her in her human form, which consists of her having long blue hair with matching eyes wearing a long light blue yukata. She makes her first appearance in chapter 21 of the manga when Himari was looking for a replacement weapon from Noihara's weapon vault, having lost Yasutsuna during her battle with Kuesu, and again in Kuesu's hotel room after the field set around the hotel was broken when the latter was pushed back towards the window by Yuto's Light Ferry powers, vomiting out numerous weapons for Himari to use. Aya can store multiple objects inside her stomach, a sort of hammerspace, and regurgitate them when necessary to the disgust of anyone who witnesses it. She also appears to have taken a liking to Yuto, having teased him in the pool chapter of Volume 0 and in Chapter 64 after Kuesu's supposed death.

Kofuyu (小冬)
A Yuki-onna who works at a ski resort. She invited Yuto and the girls to her ski resort to stop Tama, as she, like Yuto, wanted humans and ayakashi to coexist. It is revealed that two years prior to the series, the ski resort's owner (and his wife) found her unconscious during a mild winter and nursed her back to health. She has also taken quite a liking to Yuto, once flirting with him in an onsen underneath the ski lodge and referring to him as "Yuto-sama". As a Yuki-onna, she can control ice and snow and use it to trap her opponents, once doing so against Tama in her adult form.^{[ch. 43]} Her name means "Little Winter", in reference to her ayakashi species.

Ekou (恵香, Ekō)
A Tenshō-sagari working under Tama. She specializes in firearms, having used a SIG Sauer P220 and a NeoStead shotgun. According to her, she was murdered by a stalker and her body hidden inside a refrigerator in an attic; the police seem to have listed her as an unsolved case and her body has never to date been recovered.^{[ch. 72]}

Kurozakura (黒桜)
A Jorōgumo working under Tama.

=== Light novel ayakashi ===
Yama-hime (夜魔姫)
A shinboku (神体, lit. "Sacred Tree") who appears in volume 1 of the light novels.

Ginko (銀子)
A wolf spirit who appears in volume 2 of the light novels. She made a brief cameo appearance in chapter 44 of the manga at Yuto's grandparents' house.

Hana (華)
A swordswoman who appears in volume 4 of the light novels.

=== Other ayakashi ===
Tsuchigumo (土蜘蛛)
Voiced by: Tatsuki Takizawa
A spider demon that possessed Taizo and attacked Yuto and Rinko on the school rooftop. Himari managees to expel it from Taizo's body before she kills it by impaling it in front of a water tower. During its possession, Taizo's skin turns blue, numerous leg-like projections protrude from his body, and he gains the ability to fire energy spheres. It is an anime-exclusive ayakashi, as its spider form was never shown in the manga, only appearing as a floating mass of fog that was killed in a similar fashion by Himari.

Daidarabotchi (ダイダラボッチ)
Voiced by: Tashiro Kiryu
A giant ayakashi that aided Ageha in attacking Yuto and Himari in Noihara. It was later incapacitated by Himari in her demon rampage before it was finally destroyed by the energy produced from Yuto's Light Ferry. In the manga, it is revealed that it was apparently not destroyed, as Sasa mentions in chapter 26 that "Daidarabotchi sends his regards".^{[ch. 26]}

Tesuma of the Sentoro (閃蟷螂の薙蘇魔, Sentoro no Tesuma)
A mantis-like ayakashi who appeared in chapters 38-39 of the manga, assuming the guise of a man wearing sunglasses and a trenchcoat. He sided with Tama so he can witness "the world she is about to create", and was sent out to attack Himari as well as to see Yuto's Light Ferry power. He can turn his left hand into a mantis' sickle to slice his opponents and wields an H&K USP pistol as his personal sidearm. His sickle arm was sliced by Himari after he was distracted by Yuto's Light Ferry trap before he was finally killed off by Hitsugi's wire trap after he attempted to escape.

Zenju (然樹, Zenjū)
An oshira-sama (ja:おしら様), a spirit with the body of a tree stump and dead treebranches for arms, who appeared in chapter 42 of the manga. He is the leader of the ayakashi that are residing in the ski resort. He makes a brief appearance in the anime as a minor character, being part of a mob of ayakashi attempting to kill Yuto.

Gara (雅羅)
A Futakuchi-onna who appeared in the Book of the Gaiden side manga.

Hime (ヒメ)
A bakeneko who appeared in the Book of the Gaiden side manga.

== Demon Slayers ==
Demon Slayers (鬼斬り役, Onikiri-yaku) are humans with supernatural powers and abilities with the duty to slay ayakashi, which has been their primary purpose for hundreds of years. The Demon Slayers were established by the feudal lords who opposed the ayakashi and because of this, most of the surviving ayakashi bear a grudge against them for their near-extinction. The Demon Slayers consist of twelve families, each family having their own unique powers and abilities, such as the Amakawa Family with their Light Ferry ability and the Jinguji Family with their dark magic. Out of the twelve families in feudal times, less than half of the families remain in existence in present times. Each Demon Slayer family is sorted by rank, with the Jinguji Family being at the bottom (#12) and the Tsuchimikado Family at the top (#1).

Aiji Tsuchimikado (土御門 愛路, Tsuchimikado Aiji)
A bespectacled member of the Tsuchimikado Family (土御門家, Tsuchimikado Ke; ranked #1), a Demon Slayer family coming from a long line of onmyōji trailing from Abe no Seimei. He made a cameo appearance in chapter 34 of the manga and made his full appearance in chapter 51, where he reveals that he has met Yuto once in Norihara prior to the latter moving away to Takamiya.^{[ch. 51]} It is also revealed that he is not the true leader, merely acting as a stand-in for his sick father.

Ranka Mikari (三雁 藍華, Mikari Ranka)
Mikari is a descendant of the Jibashiri Family (地走家, Jibashiri Ke; ranked #8) (it has been stated by Kuesu that her family name has changed)^{[ch. 32]} and Kuesu's friend who appeared in chapters 31–33 of the manga. Her Jibashiri ancestors channeled the power of the Earth, giving them superhuman strength. They were later wiped out in the front lines of the Great War, but there are a few descendants like her (those without their powers) that survived.^{[ch. 32]} Her ancestors were also responsible for killing Shizuku's family 100 years prior to the series' start. Kuesu brought her out so that Shizuku could have her revenge, which almost succeeded hadn't it been for Yuto and Himari intervening. Before leaving after the fight ended with Shizuku letting go of her grudge, she states that she would be on Yuto's side should her powers emerge.

Kasuri Kagamimori (各務森 飛白, Kagamimori Kasuri)
Kasuri is the Demon Slayer of the Kagamimori Family (各務森家, Kagamimori Ke; ranked #3), a family that uses Shinto magic to seal ayakashi within mirrors, and is known to be the only Demon Slayer family to do so. She is a miko of the Kagamimori Shrine, and have met Himari and Kaya in the past when they visited their shrine prior to the series' start. Despite her young age (18 years), her way of speaking is reminiscent to that of an old lady's, as pointed out by Hitsugi and Himari.^{[ch. 51]} In chapter 52, she used her Shinto magic to reveal Himari's malicious side from her body and seal it, but her plan backfired when Himari's malicious side broke free from the mirror and merged with Himari.^{[ch. 52]}

As the head of the Kagamimori Family, Kasuri possesses the Beast Eye (獣の目, Kemono no Me), which is located in her left eye. Her family name translates to "mirror forest", in reference to her family's ability.

Hisuzu Kagamimori (各務森 飛鈴, Kagamimori Hisuzu)
Kasuri's younger sister. She is sometimes hot-blooded and arrogant, often requiring Kasuri to calm her down. Like most of the Demon Slayer families, she looks down to the Kuesu and her family. She specializes in advanced martial arts, and (according to Hitsugi) has killed fifteen ayakashi with her skills alone.^{[ch. 52]} She seems to have yuri-esque feelings for her older sister.

Hitsugi Yakouin (夜光院 柩, Yakōin Hitsugi)
Hitsugi is the detective-like Demon Slayer of the Yakouin Family (夜光院家, Yakōin Ke; ranked #11^{[ch. 38]}), a family that has the ability to analyze and gather information quicker than a normal human, which Himari states is similar to having the ability of seeing into the future. However, it causes sensory overload from the loss of brain cells, causing many of them to die as a result. She made her debut appearance in chapter 38 of the manga when she aided Yuto during his training session with Himari by predicting her oncoming moves. She was after Tesuma of the Sentoro, using Yuto and Himari as bait to lure him out so she can kill him through a series of wire traps set up in the forest. After his defeat, she told Himari that she will eventually die. She gets a visit from Kuesu at her office in chapter 40, eventually telling the latter that she is looking down on Yuto and the others and mentioning her and her family's lust for power.^{[ch. 40]} It remains unclear what her current intentions are at this point.

Maki Tsuchimikado (土御門 麻輝, Tsuchimikado Maki)
A member of the Tsuchimikado family.

Shido Tsuchimikado (土御門 志土, Tsuchimikado Shido)
A member of the Tsuchimikado family.

Meruhi Jinguji (神宮寺 メルヒ, Jingūji Meruhi)
Kuesu's mother who also inherited the Jinguji Family's dark magic. She was introduced as an unseen character in chapter 16 in a telephone conversation with her daughter, and has made regular (albeit voiceless) appearances since then. She made her first physical appearance in chapter 56, unlocking her daughter's power limiter in preparation for her fight against Shuten-douji.

Gennosuke Amakawa (天河 源之介, Amakawa Gennosuke) and Sawako Amakawa (天河 佐和子, Amakawa Sawako)
Voiced by: Sayuri Sadaoka (Sawako)
Yuto's grandparents that lived in Noihara and Himari's caretakers, with Gennosuke being a Demon Slayer in his younger days before he retired. Prior to Yuto moving to Takamiya with his parents, Sawako gave him an omamori which, unknown to the latter at the time, had a magic spell that hid his Demon Slayer presence from the ayakashi until his sixteenth birthday, and Gennosuke was the one who bestowed Yasutsuna to Himari prior to his death.^{[ch. 18]} Yuto later revisits their house with Himari and the others and, upon seeing their tombstone, pays his respects to them, not realizing they were dead due him being separated from them by his parents.^{[ch. 10]} Himari refers to them as "Grandpa Gen" (源爺, Gen-jii) and "Grandma Sawa" respectively.

== Other characters ==
Yū Shimamura (嶋村 有, Shimamura Yū)
Voiced by: Yū Shimamura
A bespectacled classmate at Yuto's school and the class representative of Yuto's class. She has been shown to get along well with Yuto and Rinko (albeit the fact she has larger breasts than the latter), and often jokes around with them when it comes to romantic topics, especially their close relationship with each other. She is also shown to be an otaku, once doing a witch cosplay at the school festival and playing video games in her free time.^{[ch. 2737.5]} Like Rinko, she, too, does not tolerate Taizo's pervertedness, which was shown in one chapter when she, along with Rinko, drowned him for attempting to peep at girls underwater.^{[ch. 5]} She apparently knows about the existence of the Demon Slayers, as shown in her research on Kuesu.^{[ch. 18]} She, along with her mother, were later put under Tama's control in Chapter 50, though Rinko manages to snap her out it in chapter 58. Her real name (which was not revealed until Chapter 49) is derived from voice actress Yū Shimamura who voiced her in the anime.

Taizo Masaki (柾木 泰三, Masaki Taizō) (Note: In page 13 of volume 1 of the English manga, Taizo's name was erroneously misspelled as "Kaitou".^{[ch. 1]})
Voiced by: Tatsuhisa Suzuki
Yuto's best friend and classmate. He is a shameless pervert who is attracted to almost any beautiful girl he sees, often resulting in him getting beat up for his actions. He is attracted to Himari as well as Shizuku, one time asking Himari to be his model for his art sketch only to be rejected to his disappointment and when he convinces both of them to be contestants in a swimsuit pageant he organized at the school festival.^{[ch. 27]}

Hyogo Kaburagi (鏑木 兵吾, Kaburagi Hyōgo)
Voiced by: Keiji Fujiwara
Kaburagi is a secretary working for Unit 4 of the Defense Branch for Public Peace (警備局公安4課), a secret government department whose purpose is to investigate supernatural activities. He made his first appearance in chapter 16 of the manga and is assigned to Kuesu, his job trying to keep any activity between the Demon Slayers and the ayakashi away from the public. He frequently has to deal with her arrogance and is quite concerned about her antics, once asking her how many bullets she fired from her duel with Himari.^{[ch. 20]} He later appears to recruit Yuto into his department, revealing to him and the others news about a cannibalistic ayakashi, only for Yuto to decline his offer.^{[ch. 28]}

In the anime, he left Kuesu and went to Shuten-dōji and Tama, orchestrating behind the scenes the events that will eventually lead to Himari's final battle with Tama. Because they both share similar but different goals (Kaburagi wants the ayakashi exterminated, while Shuten-dōji and Tama want to devour them to regain their full strength), he managed to reach an agreement with them that they can proceed with their plan, but they must not harm any humans as part of his deal; it was later broken after Tama's defeat by Himari's ayakashi form when Shuten-dōji betrayed him and injured him, having used him from the start to exact his revenge. In the final episode's end credits, he is last seen returning to Kuesu with a cast on his right arm. It is later revealed in the manga that he has a wife and a daughter, which was mentioned by Kuesu when she stated at her Christmas party that he left to pose as Santa Claus for his daughter.^{[ch. 35]}

Sae Kisaragi (如月 冴, Kisaragi Sae)
Voiced by: Michiko Neya
Yuto, Rinko, and Himari's schoolteacher at Touryou High. A smoker and a pervert, she always seem to catch Yuto in an erotic act with a girl, and is passively supportive of whatever erotic acts the students do as long as they do it outside of class. Rinko sometimes call her "Sae-chan", which she detests.^{[ch. 8]} It is later revealed in the manga that Sae is actually an ayakashi who protects Takamiya from the shadows, and claims to be more powerful than Himari and Shizuku at her peak. She is also the one responsible for erasing the memories of the patrons at Café Relish, and is shown to have lesbian tendencies.^{[ch. 37.5]} It is still unknown what type of ayakashi Sae is.

Yuko Akutsu (阿久津 悠子, Akutsu Yūko)
Sae's colleague and an art teacher at Touryou High.

Haru Masaki (柾木 ハル, Masaki Haru)
Taizo's younger sister. She transfers to Yuto's school as a first-year student in Chapter 49.

== See also ==
- List of Omamori Himari chapters
- List of Omamori Himari episodes
