= Core of Soul =

Japanese band

- Core of Soul in 2002

Background information
- Origin: Japan
- Genres: Pop, pop rock, downtempo, R&B
- Years active: 1998–2006
- Label: Toshiba-EMI
- Members: Iizuka Keisuke; Nakamura Fukiko (Fukko); Song Rui

Core of Soul (formerly Core of Sun) was a Japanese pop/downtempo band. The group formed when Song met Nakamura and Iizuka at a school in Osaka. They disbanded March 24, 2006 after completing their Asian tour in Osaka.

== Members ==
- Fukiko Nakamura (中村 蕗子, Nakamura Fukiko; born March 14, 1983) - Vocals
- Rui Song (ソン ルイ, Son Rui; born November 13, 1981) - Guitar and Bass, Beijing native
- Keisuke Iizuka (飯塚 啓介, Iizuka Keisuke; born January 9, 1983) - Programmer

== Discography ==
=== Albums ===
- Natural Beauty (2002) Reached #35
- Over The Time "Time Is Over" (2003) Reached #49
- Rainbow (2003) Reached #99
- 3 (2004) Reached #134
- One Love, One Day, One Life (2006) Reached #134
- The Best (2006)

=== Singles ===
- "Photosynthesis" (2001) Reached #82
- "Natural Beauty" (2001) Failed to chart
- "Full Moon Prayer" (2001) Reached #62
- "Flying People" (2002) Reached #60
- "Hanawa / Tsuki de Matsu Kimi" (花環 / 月で待つ君) (2003) Reached #87
- "Make Me a Woman" (2003) Reached #85
- "Purple Sky" (2004) Reached #91
- "Ageha" (アゲハ) (2005) Reached #90
- "Yumenori Riders" (夢乗りRiders) (2005) Reached #146
