= Qiulong =

Chinese mythical dragon

Ancient seal script for qiu 虯 "a dragon"

Qiulong (simplified Chinese: 虬龙; traditional Chinese: 虯龍; pinyin: qíulóng; Wade–Giles: ch'iu-lung; lit. 'curling dragon') or qiu was a Chinese dragon that is contradictorily defined as "horned dragon" and "hornless dragon".

== Name ==
This Chinese dragon name can be pronounced qiu or jiu and written 虯 or 虬.

=== Characters ===
The variant Chinese characters for the qiu or jiu dragon are 虯 and 虬, which combine the "insect radical" 虫 with phonetics of jiu (丩; "connect") and yin (乚; "hidden"). This 虫 radical is typically used in Chinese characters for insects, worms, reptiles, and dragons (e.g., shen (蜃), jiao (蛟), and hong (虹)). Compare the word jiu (糾 or 糺 "twist; entangle; unite") that is written with the "silk radical" 絲 and the same alternate phonetics as qiu 虯 or 虬.

Qiu 虬 or 虯 is also an uncommon Chinese surname. For example, Qiuranke Zhuan 虯髯客傳 "The Legend of the Curly-whiskered Guest" is a story by the Tang dynasty writer Du Guangting 杜光庭 (850–933 CE), and Qiu Zhong 虬仲 was the courtesy name of the Qing dynasty painter Li Fangying.

In Japanese, the kanji "Chinese characters" 虬 or 虯 are sometimes used for the mizuchi 蛟 "river dragon".

=== Etymologies ===
Sinological linguists have proposed several etymologies for the qiu or jiu 虯 dragon.

Bernhard Karlgren reconstructed Old Chinese pronunciations of qiu < *g'yŏg or jiu < *kyŏg for 虯; "horned dragon" and 觓; "horn-shaped; long and curved". This latter word combines the "horn radical" 角 and 虯's jiu 丩 phonetic.

Carr follows Karlgren's reconstructions and suggests qiu < *g'yŏg or jiu < *kyŏg 虯 is "part of a 'twist; coil; wrap' word family" that includes:

- qiu < *g'yôg 觩 "long and curved; curled up horn"
- jiu < *klyŏg 樛 "curving branch; twist"
- miu < *mlyŏg or jiu < *klyŏg 繆 "bind; wind around; wrap; twist"
- liu < *glyôg or lu < *glyôk 勠 "join forces; unite"
- jiao < *klôg 膠 "glue; unite"
- liao < *glyôg 摎 "tie around; strangle"

This "twisting; coiling" etymology can explain both the meanings "horned dragon; twisted horns" and "curling; wriggling" below.

Schuessler reconstructs Old Chinese qiu < *giu or jiu < *kiu for 觓 or 觩 "horn-shaped; long and curved" and 虯; "horned dragon", and cites Coblin's comparison of "horned dragon" with Written Tibetan klu "Nāga, serpent spirit". Schuessler compares jiu < *kiuʔ 糾 "to twist, plait" and concludes the "most likely etymology is 'twisting, wriggling'".

== Meanings ==
Chinese dictionaries give three qiu 虯 or 虬 meanings: "dragon without horns", "dragon with horns", and "curling; coiling".

=== Hornless dragon ===
Several Chinese classic texts and commentaries from the Han dynasty identified qiu (虯) as a "hornless dragon; dragon without horns", which is interpreted as "young dragon; immature dragon".

The 2nd century BCE Chuci uses qiu (虬) seven times, which is more frequently than any other classical text. The standard Sibu Beiyao 四部備要 edition gives the character as 虬 instead of 虯. Qiu is a dragon name in four contexts. The first uses yuqiu (玉虬; "jade hornless-dragon"); "I yoked a team of jade dragons to a phoenix-figured car, And waited for the wind to come, to soar up on my journey." The second uses qiulong (虬龍; "hornless dragon"); "Where are the hornless dragons which carry bears on their backs for sport?" In both contexts, commentary of Wang Yi 王逸 (d. 158 CE) says qiu means "hornless dragon" and long means "horned dragon". The third uses qingqiu (青虬; "green dragon") referring to the legendary Shun as Chong Hua 重華; "With a team of azure dragons, white serpents in the traces, I rode with Chong Hua in the Garden of Jasper." Wang notes qiu and chi are types of long "dragons". The fourth uses qiu (虬) alone; "With team of dragons I mount the heavens, In ivory chariot borne aloft."

The 121 CE Shuowen Jiezi dictionary gives inconsistent definitions of qiu (虯). Some early editions define 龍無角者 ("a dragon without horns"), while later editions define 龍子有角者 ("a young dragon with horns"). Carr notes the discrepancy of three Shuowen definitions for "hornless dragon": qiu (虯), jiao (蛟), and chi (螭). The Shuowen Jiezi scholar Zhu Junsheng 朱駿聲 (1788–1834 CE) explains that male long (龍) "dragons" have horns and female ones do not, and among young dragons, jiao (蛟) has one horn, qiu (虯) has two, and chi (螭) is hornless.

A few later sources, such as the c. 1011 CE Guangyun rime dictionary, concur with early Shuowen Jiezi editions and define qiu (虯) as "hornless dragon", but most dictionaries define a contrast set between qiu (虯) "horned dragon" and chi (螭) "hornless dragon".

=== Horned dragon ===
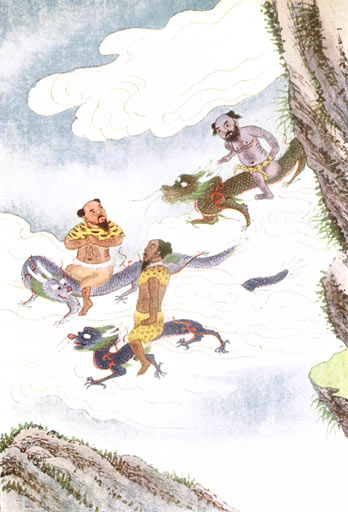
Daoist Xian riding horned dragons.

The c. 139 BCE Huainanzi "Peering into the Obscure" chapter (6) mentions qingqiu (青虯; "green horned-dragon") twice. First, "The Fable of the Dragons and the Mud-Eels" uses it with chichi (赤螭; "red hornless-dragon"); "When the red hornless dragon and the green horned dragon roamed the land of Chi 冀, the sky was limpid and the earth undisturbed." The commentary of Gao Yu 高淯 (fl. 205 CE) notes qingqiu and chichi are types of long (龍; "dragons"), but without mentioning horns. Second, a description of Fu Xi and Nüwa, who are represented as having dragon tails, uses qingqiu with yinglong (應龍; "winged dragon"); "They rode the thunder chariot, using winged dragons as the inner pair and green dragons as the outer pair."

The c. 100 BCE Shiji "Records of the Grand Historian" biography of Sima Xiangru quotes his fu (賦) poem entitled Zixu (子虛; "Sir Fantasy"). Like the Huaiananzi, it contrasts qingqiu (青虯; "green horned-dragon") with chichi (赤螭; "red hornless-dragon"), which Watson translates "horned dragon" and "hornless dragon".

Ge Hong's 4th century CE Baopuzi (抱朴子) has four references. It mentions: jiu (虬) "As to the flying to the sky of the k'iu of the pools, this is his union with the clouds", shenjiu (神虬; "divine horned-dragon") "If a pond inhabited by fishes and gavials is drained off, the divine k'iu go away", and qingjiu (青虬; "green horned-dragon") "The ts'ui k'iu (kingfisher-k'iu) has no wings and yet flies upwards to the sky", "Place the shape (i.e. an image of this dragon) in a tray, and the kingfisher-k'iu (shall) descend in a dark vapoury haze".

The c. 230 CE Guangya dictionary defines qiu (虯) (written with a rare 黽 "frog"-radical graphic variant) as "horned dragon" and chi (螭) as "hornless dragon". This semantic contrast is repeated in later dictionaries such as the 997 CE Longkan Shoujian and the c. 1080 CE Piya, which says: "If a dragon has scales, he is called kiao-lung (蛟龍); if wings, ying-lung (應龍); if a horn, k'iu-lung (虬龍); and if he has no horn, he is called ch'i-lung (螭龍)."

In traditional Chinese art, dragons are commonly represented with two horns. According to the 2nd century CE Qian fu lun, the dragon's "horns resemble those of a stag". The 1578 CE Bencao Gangmu materia medica prescribes longjue (龍角; "dragon horn"), "For convulsions, fevers, diarrhea with fever and hardened belly. Taken continuously it lightens the body, enlightens the soul and prolongs life."

=== Curling ===
Qiu can mean "curling; twisting; coiling; wriggling; writhing" in Chinese compounds. For instance:

- qiupan (虬蟠; "curled up like a dragon; curling and twisting (esp. tree roots)")
- jiaoqiu (蛟虬; "coil like a dragon")
- qiuxu (虬鬚; "curly beard; curly mustache")
- qiuran (虯髯; "curly whiskers")

Besides the four "hornless dragon" examples above, three Chuci contexts use qiu in words describing dragons "coiling; wriggling; writhing". Two use youqiu (蚴虬) to describe the canglong (蒼龍) Azure Dragon constellation: "I rode in the ivory chariot of the Great Unity: The coiling Green Dragon ran in the left-hand traces; The White Tiger made the right hand of my team"; "To hang at my girdle the coiling Green Dragon, To wear at my belt the sinuous rainbow serpent." One uses liuqiu (蟉虬) with chi (螭; "hornless dragon"): "They lined water monsters up to join them in the dance: How their bodies coiled and writhed in undulating motion!"

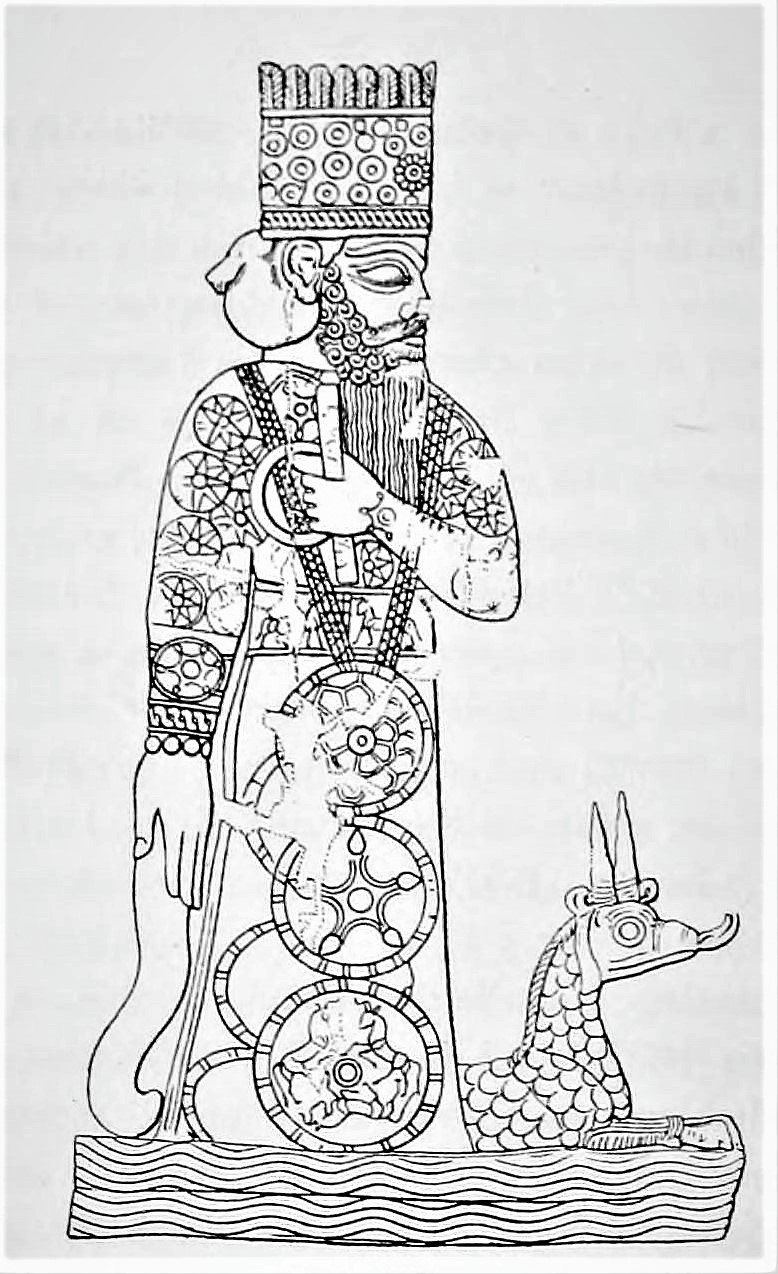
Marduk and dragon from a Babylonian cylinder seal.

== Mythic parallels ==
The ancient Chinese jiu (虯; "horned dragon") is analogous with the Mountain Horned Dragon lizard and several legendary creatures in Comparative mythology.

Assuming trans-cultural diffusion, MacKenzie suggests that the Chinese "horned-dragon, or horned-serpent" derives from the Egyptian Osiris "water-serpent". The Chinese Hui people have a myth about a silver-horned dragon that controls rainfall.

In Babylonian mythology, the deity Marduk supposedly rode a horned dragon when he defeated Tiamat, and it became his emblem. In Persian mythology, the hero Garshasp killed an Aži Sruvara "horned dragon". In Greek mythology, the two-headed Amphisbaena dragon was represented with horns.
