= Omamori Himari =

Japanese manga series

- Cover of Omamori Himari Volume 1 as published by Fujimi Shobo featuring Himari Noihara.

お守り陽毬
- Genre: Action, harem, supernatural
- Manga
- Written by: Milan Matra
- Published by: Fujimi Shobo (Magazine, Vol. 6–12); Kadokawa Shoten (tankōbon, Vol. 1-5)
- English publisher: NA: Yen Press
- Imprint: Kadokawa Comics Dragon Jr. (Vol. 1-5); Dragon Comics Age (Vol. 6–12)
- Magazine: Monthly Dragon Age; Age Premium (2011–2013)
- Original run: June 9, 2006 – September 9, 2013
- Volumes: 13 (12 + Volume 0)
- Light novel
- Written by: Kougetsu Mikazuki
- Illustrated by: Milan Matra
- Published by: Fujimi Shobo
- Imprint: Fujimi Fantasia Bunko
- Magazine: Dragon Magazine
- Original run: July 19, 2008 – January 20, 2010
- Volumes: 4
- Anime television series
- Directed by: Shinji Ushiro
- Produced by: Seiichi Hachiya; Tomoko Kawasaki; Tomoko Suzuki; Tsuneo Takechi; Yoshifumi Kominato; Yuka Harada
- Written by: Katsumi Hasegawa
- Music by: Yukari Hashimoto
- Studio: Zexcs
- Licensed by: NA: Funimation
- Original network: TV Saitama, Chiba TV, Tokyo MX, TV Aichi, NTV, TV Kanagawa, TVQ, Sun Television
- Original run: January 6, 2010 – March 24, 2010
- Episodes: 12
- Manga

Omamori Himari: Book of the Gaiden
- Written by: Milan Matra
- Illustrated by: Nikubanare
- Published by: Fujimi Shobo (Magazine); Kadokawa Shoten (tankōbon)
- Imprint: Dragon Comics Age
- Magazine: Monthly Dragon Age
- Published: September 9, 2011
- icon

Omamori Himari (おまもりひまり; "Protective Charm Himari"), also known as OmaHima (おまひま) for short, is a Japanese manga series written and illustrated by Milan Matra. The story revolves around Yuto Amakawa, an orphan who, on his sixteenth birthday, meets Himari, a cat spirit samurai girl who has sworn an oath to protect Yuto from the various monsters and demons that are out to kill him.

Omamori Himari ran in Fujimi Shobo's Monthly Dragon Age from June 2006 to September 2013, and twelve tankōbon volumes were published between February 7, 2007, and November 9, 2013. A four-panel spinoff also ran in Dragon Age from November 2009 to November 2010, and a light novel adaptation by Kougetsu Mikazuki was serialized in Dragon Magazine, with four volumes released from July 2008 to January 2010. A 12-episode anime adaptation by Zexcs aired in Japan between January and March 2010 on TV Saitama, Chiba TV, and other networks. The manga is licensed in North America by Yen Press, with the first volume published on October 26, 2010.

== Plot ==
The series revolves around Yuto Amakawa, a seemingly ordinary teenager with a troubled past. Seven years ago, his parents died in a car accident, leaving him alone without a single relative. The only item that was left of his family is a strange and mysterious amulet which was given to him by his late grandmother. Ever since then, his childhood friend Rinko Kuzaki (and her parents^{[ch. 1]}) has cooked for and taken care of him. His life takes a surprising turn on his 16th birthday when he meets Himari, a cat demon samurai girl. Himari reveals to him that his family and ancestors were part of the twelve Demon Slayer families that have been slaying demons since the feudal era, and that he too is a Demon Slayer. She has sworn an oath from his family to protect Yuto from the various demons that are out to kill him, but Yuto's cat allergies makes the issue much more complicated.

Later on, Yuto encounters various other girls who take a liking to him: Shizuku, a mizuchi or water deity in the form of a small child; Lizlet, a tsukumogami or artifact spirit in the form of a busty tea-serving maid; and Kuesu, another Demon Slayer who is revealed to be Yuto's fiancée and a person from Yuto's forgotten past.

As the series progresses, Yuto and the group encounter some powerful ayakashi, with some of them being allies, and Yuto eventually makes a life-changing decision to fight for his belief of coexistence between human and ayakashi.

== Media ==
=== Manga ===
Omamori Himari began serialization in the July 2006 issue Fujimi Shobo's manga magazine Monthly Dragon Age (released on June 9, 2006), and concluded its run in the October 2013 issue (released on September 9, 2013), spanning a total of seventy-five chapters throughout. Twelve bound volumes were released by Fujimi Shobo between February 7, 2007, and November 9, 2013. The first five volumes were published under Kadokawa Shoten's "Dragon Jr." imprint, while the remaining volumes were published under Fujimi Shobo's "Dragon Comics Age" imprint. An official guidebook to the series (sold as Volume 0) was published by Kadokawa Shoten on October 24, 2009. The manga was also serialized in Fujimi Shobo's paid online magazine, Age Premium, starting from the inaugural September 2011 issue (released on August 3, 2011) to the November 2013 issue. An epilogue to the series was published in the author's artbook, Omamori Himari Virgin Art Book: Milan Matra Art Works (おまもりひまり 処女画集 ～MATRA MILAN Art Works～, Omamori Himari Shojo Gashū ～MATRA MILAN Art Works～), published by Fujimi Shobo on January 9, 2014.

In North America, the manga is licensed by Yen Press, and released all thirteen volumes (twelve plus Volume 0) from October 26, 2010, to July 22, 2014. The manga is also licensed in Taiwan by one of Kadokawa Shoten's subsidiary companies, Kadokawa Media, and in Germany by Panini Comics (under the title of Talisman Himari).

==== Spin-offs ====
A four-panel spinoff illuratrated by Nikubanare called Omamori Himari: Himari's Panties (おまもりひまり 緋鞠のおぱんちゅ, Omamori Himari: Himari no Opanchu) began serialization in the November 2009 issue of Dragon Age, and ended in the November 2010 issue. A compilation called Omamori Himari 1/4: Himari's 4-Koma Anthology (おまもりひまり1/4 緋鞠の4こまあんそろじぃ, Omamori Himari 1/4: Himari no Yonkoma Ansorojyi), featuring comics illustrated by various artists, was released by Kadokawa Shoten on April 9, 2010.

A bonus two-part side story prologue, called Omamori Himari: Book of the Gaiden (おまもりひまり 外伝の書, Omamori Himari: Gaiden no Sho), also illustrated by Nikubanare, was released by Fujimi Shobo on September 9, 2011. The stories were serialized in the May 2011 and June 2011 issues of Dragon Age.

=== Light novel ===
A light novel adaptation written by Kougetsu Mikazuki and illustrated by Matra began serialization in the July 2008 issue of Fujimi Shobo's Dragon Magazine. The first volume was released on July 19, 2008, and released four volumes until January 20, 2010, under their Fujimi Fantasia Bunko imprint. The light novels consists of side stories that differ from the manga's plot, and introduces new novel-exclusive characters.

=== Anime ===
A 12-episode anime adaptation produced by Zexcs and directed by Shinji Ushiro aired on TV Saitama and Chiba TV from January 6 to March 24, 2010, with subsequent broadcasts on Tokyo MX, TV Aichi, NTV, TV Kanagawa, TVQ Kyushu Broadcasting, and Sun Television. Six DVD compilation volumes were released by Kadokawa Pictures between March 26 and August 28, 2010. English-subtitled simulcasts were provided by Crunchyroll on its video portal. A Blu-ray box set was released on January 27, 2012. On August 12, 2016, it was announced that Funimation had licensed the series, a release date is set for November 8, 2016. Later it was confirmed that Crunchyroll was added the series alongside Time Travel Girl and Three Leaves, Three Colors on their catalog since December 21, 2016.

The opening theme for the anime is "Oshichau zo!!" (押しちゃうぞっ!!) by AyaRuka, consisting of singers Aya Sakamoto and Ruka Kawada. The ending theme is "BEAM my BEAM" by Himarinko L. Shizukuesu (ひまりんこ・L・しずくえす), consisting of the main female cast. From episodes seven through eleven, the seventh episode version was sung by Ami Koshimizu; the eighth episode version was sung by Iori Nomizu; the ninth episode version was sung by Kei Shindo; the tenth episode version was sung by Asuka Ōgame; and the eleventh episode version was sung by Yuki Matsuoka. The ending theme for episode 12 is "Sakamichi no Hate" (坂道の果て; "At the End of the Hill") by Yuto Amakawa (Daisuke Hirakawa). "Oshichau zo!!" and "BEAM my BEAM" were later released as maxi singles by Columbia Music Entertainment on February 24, 2010.

=== Other media ===
An internet radio show promoting the anime called OmaHima☆HR (おまひま☆HR) aired on Animate and ran 13 episodes from November 12, 2009, to April 30, 2010. The show was hosted by Ami Koshimizu and Iori Nomizu, the voices of Himari Noihara and Rinko Kuzaki, respectively, and guest voices from the anime series appeared for each radio episode. The theme song used is "love and peace" by Koshimizu. A CD containing all 13 episodes was released on August 13, 2010, by Columbia Music Entertainment.

== Reception ==
=== Manga sales ===
In Japan, Omamori Himari has been featured on the Tohan charts, with Volume 4 reaching No. 29 between November 11, 2008, and November 17, 2008 and Volume 5 reaching No. 15 between April 7 and April 13, 2009, the highest ranking to date.

It has also been featured on the Oricon charts, with Volume 6 reached No. 27 between January 11 and January 17, 2010, Volume 7 reaching No. 16 between August 2, 2010, and August 8, 2010, on its first week of sales and No. 22 between August 9 and August 15, 2010, on its second; Volume 8 reaching No. 19 on the Oricon charts between April 4 and April 10, 2011, on its first week of sales and No. 30 between April 11 and April 17, 2011, on its second week; and Volume 10 reaching No. 17 on the Oricon charts between August 6 and August 12, 2012, on its first week of sales, selling 35,729 copies, the highest ranking achieved on the charts and the second-highest in the series to date. However, Volume 10's ranking sharply declined to No. 44 on its second week, selling only 16,485 copies for a total of 52,194 copies. It is also the series' lowest ranking since Volume 8's second week.

In North America, Omamori Himari has been featured in The New York Times Manga Best Seller List, with the third volume reaching No. 7 between April 24 and April 30, 2011, Volume 5 at No. 8 between November 20 and November 26, 2011, Volume 7 at No. 9 between May 27 and June 2, 2012, Volume 8 at No. 5 between August 19 and August 25, 2012, Volume 0 at No. 4 between September 23 and September 29, 2012, and Volume 9 at No. 5 between November 18 and November 24, 2012, all on their first week of sales. Volume 0 has the highest ranking on the list to date in North America, beating out Volume 21 of Fairy Tail on its first week and Volume 64 of One Piece, which has been on the list for three weeks straight.

Omamori Himari has also been featured on Nielsen BookScan's Best-Selling Graphic Novels List, with Volume 7 debuting at No. 22 between May 14, 2012, and May 20, 2012, before the volume's official release, No. 14 between May 21, 2012, and May 27, 2012, on its first week of sales, and No. 21 between May 28, 2012, and June 3, 2012, on its second week of sales, selling a total of 1,270 copies.

== See also ==
- Demonizer Zilch, another series by Matra
