= Daidarabotchi =

Japanese yōkai

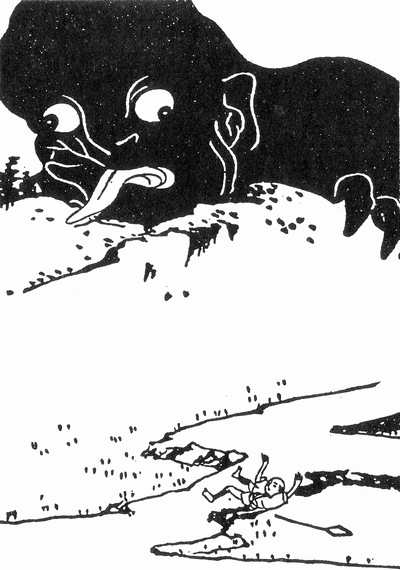
Daidarabotchi graphic from the Kaidan-Hyakki-Zue.

Daidarabotchi (ダイダラボッチ, 大座法師) was a gigantic type of yōkai in Japanese mythology, sometimes said to pose as a mountain range when sleeping.

== Mythology ==
The size of a Daidarabotchi was so great that his footprints were said to have created innumerable lakes and ponds. In one legend, a Daidarabotchi weighed Mount Fuji and Mount Tsukuba to see which was heavier, but he accidentally split Tsukuba's peak after he was finished with it.

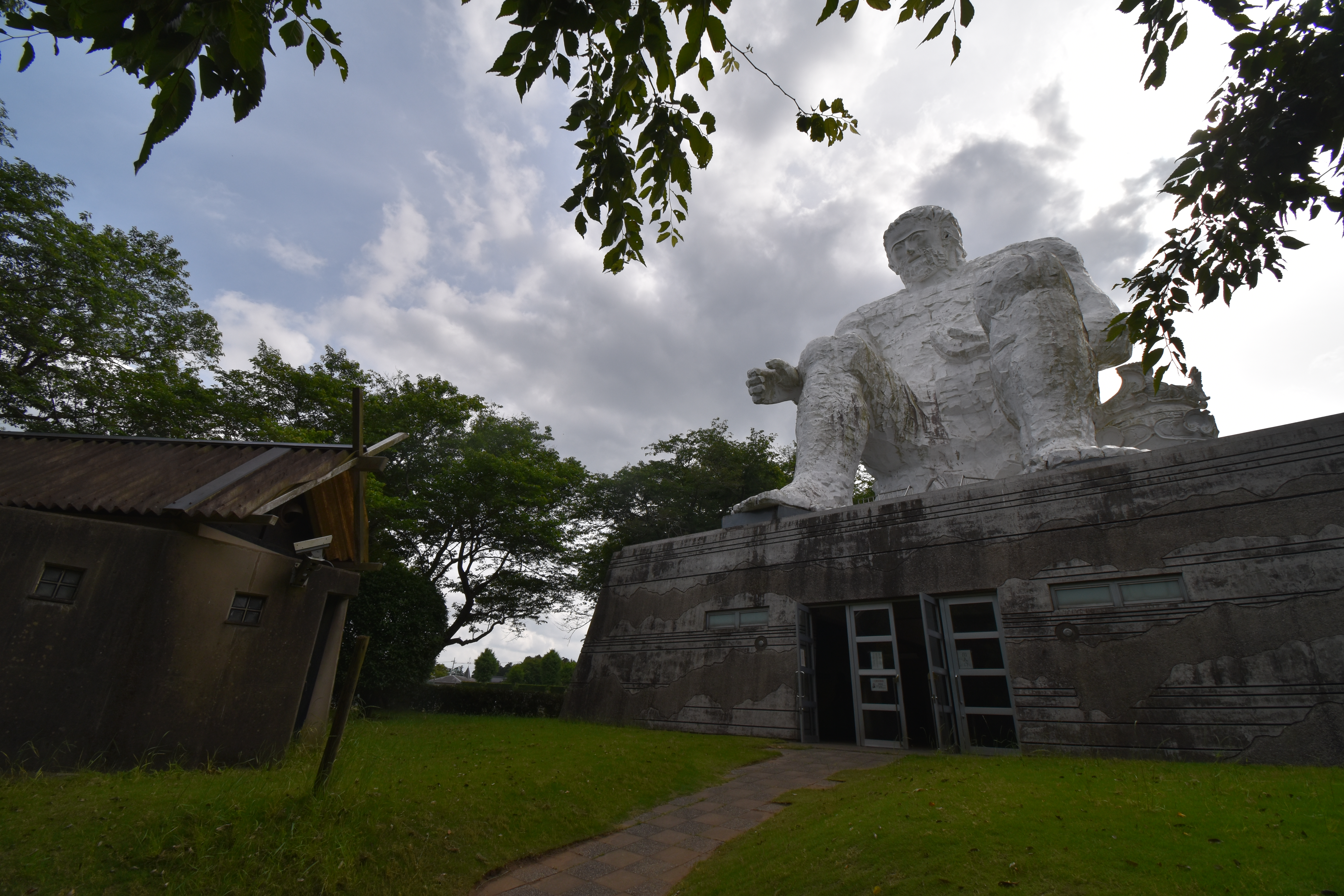
Statue in Ogushi Kaizuka Park

The Hitachi no Kuni Fudoki, a recording of the imperial customs in the Hitachi Province compiled in the 8th century, also told of a Daidarabotchi living on a hill west of a post office of Hiratsu Ogushi who fed on giant clams from the beach, piling the shells on top of a hill. In the larger Ibaraki Prefecture, Daidarabotchi was considered a benevolent giant, moving mountains to aid the people of Ibaraki. In Mito, Ibaraki, a 15-meter statue was erected in Ogushi Kaizuka Park to commemorate the yōkai and its myths.

Izumo no Kuni Fudoki also mentions a legendary king of Izumo, Ōmitsunu, who was the grandson of Susanoo and a demi-god. Having the strength of a giant, he performed Kuni-biki, pulling land from Silla with ropes, to increase the size of his territory.

The Daidarabotchi was also said to reside at Mount Togakushi, where there exists a pond on its south side bearing its name.
