= Mizuchi =

Water deity

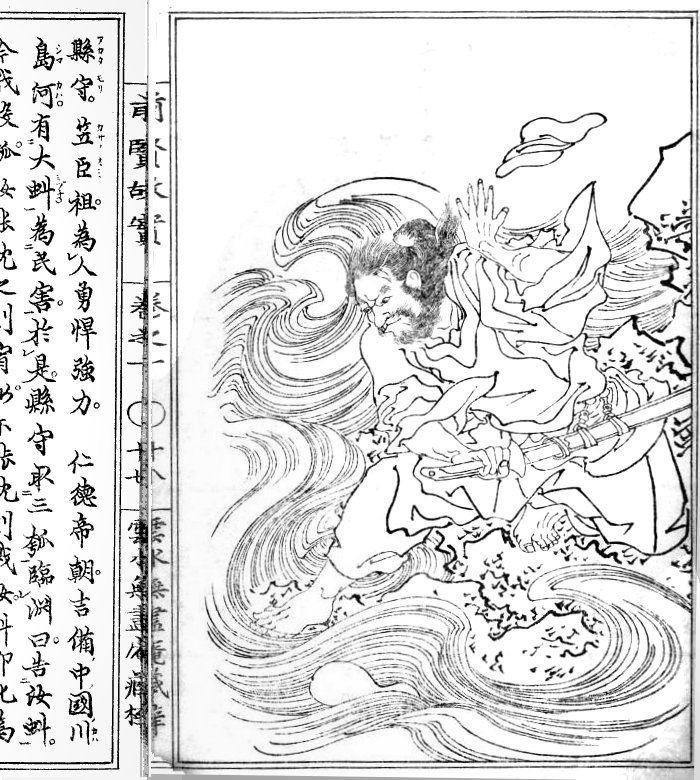
Agatamori battling mizuchi in the pool. From Zenken kojitsu (1878)

The Mizuchi (大虬, 蛟龍, 蛟, 美都知) is a type of Japanese dragon or legendary serpent-like creature, either found in an aquatic habitat or otherwise connected to water. Some commentators perceived it to have been a water deity. It is described in the Nihon Shoki and one Man'yōshū poem.

== Etymology ==
In olden times pronounced mi-tsu-chi, the word can be broken down to mi "water" + tsu a particle meaning "of" + chi "spirit". The -chi is glossed as a word root used only as a part of a compound word (as a suffix, etc.)

== Chinese character representation ==
Mizuchi is also the Japanese transliteration for several Chinese glyphs, each glyph putatively representing a type of Chinese dragon: namely the jiāolóng (蛟竜; Japanese: kōryū) or "4-legged dragon", the qiúlóng (虬竜 or 虯竜; Japanese: kyūryū) or "hornless dragon" and the chīlóng (螭竜; Japanese: chiryū) or "yellow dragon".

F. J. Daniels (Note: Emeritus Professor of Japanese at University of London, died August 1983.) cautions that for okami (龗) and mizuchi, "it is unsafe to deduce their forms from the Chinese characters allotted to them". Kunio Yanagita also emphasized that while the use of character like 虬 may suggest a snake-like being, it should be stressed that the mizuchi signifies a "water spirit".

== Early references ==
The ancient chronicle Nihongi contains references to mizuchi. Under the 67th year of the reign of Emperor Nintoku (conventionally dated 379 AD), it is mentioned that in central Kibi Province, at a fork on Kawashima River (川嶋河, old name of Takahashi River in Okayama Prefecture), a great water serpent or dragon (大虬) dwelt and would breathe or spew out its venom, poisoning and killing many passersby. (Note: The text designates the creature as a qiulong (虬/虯) in Chinese prose (kanbun), but the annotation gives its Japanese reading as mitsuchi.)

This mizuchi was exterminated by a man named Agatamori (県守), ancestor of the Kasa-no-omi (笠臣) clan. He approached the pool of the river, cast three calabashes which floated to the surface of the water and challenged the beast to make these gourds sink, threatening to slay it should it fail. The beast transformed into a deer and tried unsuccessfully to sink them, whereby the man slew the monster. The record goes on to say: "...He further sought out the water-dragon's fellows. Now the tribe of all the water-dragons filled a cave in the bottom of the pool. He slew them every one and the water of the river became changed to blood. Therefore that water was called the pool of Agatamori".

A river-god reported seen in Nintoku 11 (putatively 323 AD) is also regarded by commentators to be a mizuchi, due to paralleling circumstances. On that year, the Mamuta dikes built along Yodo River kept getting breached and the Emperor guided by an oracular dream ordered two men, Kowa-kubi from Musashi Province and Koromo-no-ko from Kawachi Province, be sought out and sacrificed to the "River God" or Kawa-no-kami (河伯). (Note: Note that 河伯 in China designates the Hebo deity.) One of the men, who resisted being sacrificed, employed the floating calabash and dared the River God to sink it as proof to show it was truly divine will that demanded him as sacrifice. A whirlwind came and tried, but the calabash just floated away, and thus he extricated himself from death using his wits. Although River God is not called mizuchi in the source, Aston has regarded the River God (Kawa-no-kami) and the mizuchi as equivalent.

Visser concludes, "From this passage, we learn that in ancient times human sacrifices were made to the dragon-shaped river-gods". Michael Dylan Foster suggests this is "perhaps the first documented appearance of the water spirit that would become known popularly in Japan as the kappa". (Note: In Japanese folklore the kappa is a water sprite often considered benignly mischievous, (and thus may appear unlike a sacrifice-demanding serpent). But the kappa can also be seen as sinister, reaching in and extracting the liver or the shirikodama from humans.)

A mizuchi is also mentioned in the Man'yōshū, the ancient collection of Japanese poems. The tanka poem #3833 composed by Prince Sakaibe can be loosely paraphrased to mean "I could ride a tiger to leap over the Old Shack, to the green pool, to take down the mizuchi dragon there, if only I had a sword capable of doing just that". (Note: The shark (鮫) character in the poem's original text is emended to the mizuchi (蛟) character. Kariya Ekisai in his annotation to the Wamyō Ruijushō remarks: "Considering the Manyōshū (quote follows).. the kōryō/jiaolong ` shark-dragon´ is actually kōryō/jiaolong ` flood dragon´, and correctly read as ` midzuchi´ 万葉集を按ずに.. 鮫龍即蛟龍也、宜しく美都知と訓ず".)

== Folklorist studies ==
Polymath Minakata Kumagusu, in his essay Jūnishi kō: mi(hebi) (『十二支考』, "A Study of Twelve Animals of Chinese Zodiac") states "Even in our country (Japan), the various snakes that dwelled by water and were feared by people seemed to have been called mizuchi, or 'master of the water'". Here Minakata draws on Edo Period scholar Motoori Norinaga' suggestion that the -chi signified an honorific. (Note: Minakata misquoted Norinaga, but Norinaga said chi was the honorific. Minakata wrote: "When Motoori Norinaga said tsuchi was an honorific, he must have interpreted it as a master of water or somesuch 本居宣長はツチは尊称だと言ったは、水の主ぬしくらいに解いたのだろ". What Norinaga actually stated was "there are many examples of [deities' names that are called] so-and-so -zuchi, where zu is a word akin to "of" while chi is an honorific 某豆知（なにづち）と云例あまたありて..豆（づ）は之（の）に通ふ辞、知（ち）は称名（たたへな）なり".) As stated above folklorist Yanagita emphasized the meaning of chi as "spirit".

=== Corruption into kappa ===
Minakata also conjectured that in some parts of the country, mizuchi eventually came to be regarded as creatures of the kappa kind. This is because the kappa creatures are known locally by many names that sound much like mizuchi, such as mizushi (former Noto Province, Ishikawa Prefecture), medochi (Nanbu region, parts of Iwate, Aomori, Akita), mintsuchi (Ezo, now Hokkaido). (Note: Cf. other local synonyms of kappa such as medochi (Ehime prefecture) and mizushi (Fukui prefecture) mentioned by Asakawa Zen'an's Zen'an zuihitsu.)

Furthermore, in the lore of Echigo Province (Niigata Prefecture), the kappa was said to abhor the calabash gourd, which is reminiscent of the episodes in Nihon Shoki where the River God or mizuchi are challenged to submerge the calabashes. Similar observations are made by folklorists Yanagita and Jun'ichirō Ishikawa.

Minakata was also encouraged by the fact that the snake and the kappa (alongside the suppon soft-shelled turtle) were grouped as three creatures known to kill humans in water by Asakawa Zen'an's essay Zen'an zuihitsu and conjectured that there used to be lore where sacred snakes which were "masters of the body of water" would transform into human form and wreak havoc, but terms such as mizushi became reserved for the kappa-kind, whereas the terms to refer to the "masters of the body of water" as mizuchi became forgotten.

== In popular culture ==
(vehicles, vessels)

- Kōryū (submarine) (Japanese: 蛟竜), (synonymous with mizuchi), an ex-Japanese Navy submarine.
- Jiaolong (Chinese: 蛟龙号), a Chinese deep-ocean submersible.

(novels)

- "Mizuchi" (『水霊 ミズチ』), a 1998 horror novel by Hirohumi Tanaka and its 2006 horror movie adaptation directed by Kiyoshi Yamamoto, entitled "Death Water" in English, though theme is "water spirit" and not dragon.
- Sohryuden: Legend of the Dragon Kings (novel) – A man named Mizuchi (水池) is an allusion.
- In Andrew Rowe's Arcane Ascension series, Mizuchi, also known as Hero's End or Guardian of Secrets, is a giant water serpent, spire guardian of the Serpent Spire, and one of the God Serpent's daughters.

(manga, anime)

- Eight Clouds Rising – Mizuchi (水蛇, "Watersnake") is one of seven divine swords.
- GeGeGe no Kitaro (manga, anime) – a kōryū (syn. mizuchi) appears as adversary.
- Omamori Himari (manga, novella, anime) – the character Shizuku is a mizuchi.
- Our Home's Fox Deity. – A miko priestess is possessed by a mizuchi.
- Samurai Deeper Kyo (manga) – Demon Eyes Kyo uses an attack called "mizuchi" in his sword fighting style. Compare Japanese kōryū or kōryō 蛟竜 "rain dragon; hidden genius; Kaiten torpedo".
- Noragami (manga, anime) – the character Nora is called Mizuchi by Father and is frequently shown walking over water.
- Spirited Away (anime, movie) – the character Haku looks like a Mizuchi and he is a river spirit.
- Inuyasha (manga) - the character a snake yokai called Mizuchi using its spit venom and poison mist.
- Yashahime: Princess Half-Demon (anime) - the character a snake yokai called Mizuchi using its spit venom and poison mist.

(games)

- Mah-jong Fight Club (game) – player character becomes kōryū (one of the true dragons) when certain conditions are met.
- Monster Hunter 2 (PS 2) – an elder dragon type named Ōnazuchi is a take on mizuchi; named Chameleos in English-language platforms.
- Neo Geo Battle Coliseum (game) – a boss character named Mizuchi, a clone of Orochi from The King of Fighters '97
- Ōkamiden (game) – a water dragon boss that used to be the guardian of a seaside village.
- Nioh 2 (game) – there is a water dragon guardian spirit called Mizuchi that the player can be imbued to characters to gain protection and special effects.
- Sakuna: Of Rice and Ruin (game) - The antagonist and final boss is a three headed water dragon named Omizuchi. The prefix o- is a Japanese honorific (keigo).
- Mizuchi 白蛇心傳 (game) - an important character that appears in two of the five endings.

== See also ==
- Gorgon
- Jiaolong
- Mintuci, Ainu water spirit
- Nāga, Indian serpent god
- Tlaloc, Aztec god of rain
