= Aikatsu! season 3 =

Aikatsu!
- Season 3
- No. of episodes: 51

Release
- Original network: TV Tokyo
- Original release: October 2, 2014 – September 24, 2015

Season chronology
- ← Previous; Aikatsu! season 2 Next → Aikatsu! season 4

The following is a list of episodes for the third season of Sunrise' anime television series, Aikatsu!, which aired on TV Tokyo between October 2, 2014, and September 24, 2015. This season focuses on Akari Ozora, a first year at Starlight Academy who seeks to become a top idol like her upperclassman, Ichigo Hoshimiya. For episodes 102–126, the opening theme is "Du-Du-Wa DO IT!!" by Ruka, Mona, and Miki from AIKATSU☆STARS! with Waka from STAR☆ANIS and the ending theme is "Good morning my dream", also performed by Ruka, Mona, and Miki from AIKATSU☆STARS! From episode 127 onwards, the opening theme is "Lovely Party Collection" by Ruka, Mona, and Miki from AIKATSU☆STARS! (with Miho, Nanase and Kana in episode 152) and the ending theme is "Tutu Ballerina" (チュチュ・バレリーナ, Chuchu Barerīna), also performed by Mona, Ruka, and Miki from AIKATSU☆STARS!

== Episodes ==
No.	Season no.	Title	Original release date
102	1	"Let's Aikatsu☆Ready Go!!"; Transliteration: "Aikatsu Shiyō☆Ready Go!!" (Japanese: アイカツしよう☆Ready Go!!)	October 2, 2014
During a rainfall, the roof in Akari's dorm room starts leaking, resulting in Akari and her roommate, Yuu, having to move into separate dorms, with Akari moving in with Sumire Hikami, who she met by coincidence that morning. After receiving new Aikatsu Phones and cards from Orihime, Akari and Sumire try to break the ice between them, but Akari cannot learn much before Sumire has to go off to her lessons. Akari is soon alerted about an audition to become Ichigo's manager for a day, inviting Sumire to audition alongside her and spend the day training with her, but it would increase the number of rivals she would have. Sumire, who had mostly practised by herself and considered all the other students rivals, felt happy that she could spend time practising with a friend. Sumire wins the audition at the end, while Akari – despite not winning herself – feels happy that she has become closer friends with Sumire.
103	2	"Good Fortune"; Transliteration: "Ī Koto Uranai" (Japanese: いいこと占い)	October 9, 2014
On the day before her job with Ichigo, Sumire gets a less than favorable horoscope, but finds a way to twist it into something positive. Later, Akari helps Sumire read up on Ichigo, with Ichigo herself giving her a bag of things to look over. The next day, Ichigo allows Akari to join Sumire as they both serve as her managers for her day of activities. After a few recording sessions, the girls soon partake in Ichigo's unique idol activities. At the end of the day, as Akari and Sumire are invited to Ichigo and Aoi's room, Sumire laments the gap between her and Ichigo, but Ichigo assures her that she has been though the same thing, encouraging her to keep trying even if the gap never closes. As thanks for her duties, Ichigo gives Sumire some special Romance Dress Aikatsu Cards for her performance, which her older sister comes to see.
104	3	"Aikatsu Dash!"; Transliteration: "Aikatsu Dasshu!" (Japanese: アイカツダッシュ！)	October 16, 2014
Akari meets Hinaki Shinjo, a child actor from Sumire's class, who has been interested in her ever since her entrance audition where she inadvertently introduced herself as Ichigo. The two of them decide to enter for the Pon Pon Crepe Girl audition, with Hinaki suggesting they practise their ability to express how delicious something is. Hinaki later reveals she's been lacking confidence in her own expressions, having done so many gourmet reports during her work that she feels her comments haven't been fresh lately, and states it was Akari's audition that lit a fire in her. Hinaki gives Akari a hair accessory card for their audition, which gives Akari the edge needed to win.
105	4	"Effervescent Sparkle"; Transliteration: "Hajikeru Hirameki" (Japanese: はじけるヒラメキ☆)	October 23, 2014
As part of her role as the Pon Pon Crepe Girl, Akari needs to come up with a pose for a promotional poster. With help from Hinaki, Akari manages to come up with a variety of poses, but also notices Hinaki seems to be downhearted about something. After getting some sound advice from Ichigo, Akari is invited by Johnny to attend Hinaki's event following her poster shoot. After impressing the poster staff with her unique poses, Akari, along with Sumire, goes to visit Hinaki, who explains that, following an accident four years ago when she slipped on stage, she had been holding back her own enthusiasm in order to keep people from worrying about her, sticking with what staff decide for her instead of staying true to herself. Inspired by some of Akari's draft poses, Hinaki decides to take a step forward and wear a coordinate she chose herself for her performance.
106	5	"Idol Halloween"; Transliteration: "Aidoru Harouin" (Japanese: アイドル☆ハロウィン)	October 30, 2014
With Halloween approaching, Johnny tasks students with collecting as much candy as possible in order to star in the annual Nightmare Party. On Halloween Night, Sumire's cuteness eventually receives a lot of candies, especially from Aoi. Johnny shows some trials for students to earn even more candy, one of which involves determining who Ichigo is among a group of students dressed as Jack-o-lanterns. After using process of elimination to bring down the numbers, Akari eventually uses foods to lure out Ichigo and earn a reward that brings her into the lead. While choosing a Halloween dress for her performance, Akari decides to try out the new Dreamy Crown brand, which turns out to be a perfect fit for her.
107	6	"Two Dreamers"; Transliteration: "Futari no Dorīmā" (Japanese: 2人のドリーマー)	November 6, 2014
Akari is informed about her first solo concert, which will take place at a shopping mall. Feeling that this could be a decisive moment for her, she decides to try and obtain a Premium Dress from Dream Crown's designer, Tsubasa Sena, who is wrapped in mystery. Akari travels to Dreamy Crown's headquarters and is surprised to discover Tsubasa is actually a boy. Tsubasa shows her the Premium Dress he has been working on, stating it would probably take him one month to complete. With her concert in three days, Akari decides to search for the berries he needs to dye the dress' ribbon and speed up the process, searching several times to find berries that match the color Tsubasa wanted. Thanks to Akari's efforts, Tsubasa eventually finishes the Odette Swan Coord Premium Dress for her concert, earning a great reputation for the two of them.
108	7	"Gather Your Feelings Into an Apple"; Transliteration: "Omoi wa Ringo ni Komete" (Japanese: 想いはリンゴにこめて)	November 13, 2014
Wanting to get a Premium Dress herself, Sumire and the others visit Yurika for advice on how to appeal to Loli Gothic's top designer, Maya. Following the Snow White theme his upcoming dress is based on, Sumire decides to make some baked cinnamon apples for Maya. Arriving at Maya's mansion, Sumire faces many trials which Akari and Hinaki help her overcome. Impressed with Sumire's capabilities, and her treats, Maya gives Sumire the Snow Princess Coord.
109	8	"Aikatsu's Hot Wind!"; Transliteration: "Aikatsu no Atsui Kaze!" (Japanese: アイカツのアツい風！)	November 20, 2014
As an audition is held for the starring role in a new drama alongside Ichigo, Aoi, and Ran, a new transfer student, Juri Kurebayashi, expresses her passionate desire to win the role. Hinaki reveals Juri was once a child star like she was, who was calmer before she mysteriously quit acting a few years ago, becoming curious as to why she returned. On the day of the audition, Juri becomes irritated when her famous actor mother, Karen, comes to watch and starts attracting attention. Juri later explains that, having seen her mother practice hard for her own roles, she decided she refused to ride on the coattails of her mother's success and instead take a break from acting to train herself to become a true actress with her power. Receiving encouragement from Akari to show her strength, a confident Juri performs in her audition and wins the role.
110	9	"The Passionate Sangria Rosa"; Transliteration: "Jōnetsu no Sanguria Rossa" (Japanese: 情熱のサングリアロッサ)	November 27, 2014
Juri feels downhearted as she is unsatisfied with her own performance for an upcoming episode. Karen explains to her that when she was in an acting route, it was a premium dress from her favorite brand, Sangria Rosa, the helped her overcome it. Therefore, Juri meets Sangria Rosa's top designer, Atsushi Encierro – who has been out of contact for a few weeks – with the others deciding to help her with her search. After checking a few places, Juri eventually finds him, only to find he is also in a rut over his designs and cannot help her with a premium dress. Wanting to help Atsushi regain his passion, Juri and the others try giving him his favorite things, but it is not until he sees Juri's passionate flamenco dance that he understands what he had been missing. As gratitude, Atsushi makes Juri the Rose Glass Princess Coord, which helps to reignite her own passionate acting.
111	10	"Dear My Fan!"; Transliteration: "Dia Mai Fan!" (Japanese: ディア マイ ファン！)	December 4, 2014
Raichi and Noelle's classmate, Asahi Azuma – who is a big fan of Akari – learns that she will appear in her first handshake event alongside Sumire. Meanwhile, Aoi invites Akari and Sumire to watch her appearance on a variety show to observe how she interacts with her fans. Aoi asks them to think about things from the fan's perspective, with Akari looking back on her own fondness towards Ichigo. On the day of Akari and Sumire's event, Asahi catches a cold and cannot attend it, so Raichi sends Noelle to let Akari chat with Asahi on phone before helping him set up a virtual avatar for her performance.
112	11	"Go Go! Ichigo Cheer Squad"; Transliteration: "Go Go! Ichigo Ōen-tai" (Japanese: GOGO！いちご応援隊)	December 11, 2014
After Ichigo announces her own Great Starmiya Ichigo Festival, which is produced by Aoi and Ran, Akari decides she wants to help with the preparations. Tasked with coming up with ideas to promote the festival, Akari and her friends become the Go Go Ichigo Cheer Squad complete with strawberry hats. Later, the girls help to give an opening talk at a guerrilla concert, where they manage to handle themselves when faced with unexpected questions about the festival from the press. Impressed by her courage, Ichigo decides to sing Akari's favorite song for her performance.
113	12	"Stylish Vivid Girl"; Transliteration: "Oshare Vividdo Gāru" (Japanese: オシャレ☆ヴィヴィッドガール)	December 18, 2014
With a week until Christmas, Sakura is put in charge of preparations for the Christmas Party, which includes a special Aikatsu Christmas Stage. Aiming to audition for the stage alongside Akari and Sumire, Hinaki decides she needs to get a Vivid Kiss Premium Dress so she can perform a Heroine Appeal. While trying to find out top designer Kayoko's whereabouts, Hinaki reveals she was previously rejected by her three years ago as she felt she was missing something. Orihime informs her of a party Kayoko is celebrating, which only the most fashionable people can attend, so the girls take Hinaki clothes shopping, managing to pick out some fashionable coords. On the day of the party, an accident leads to the girls' clothes becoming ruined, but Hinaki manages to find a way to make them even more fashionable in the process. Feeling that Hinaki has found what she was missing; a fashion sense of her own, Kayoko allows the girls into their party and has Hinaki perform on stage, deciding to make her a Premium Dress.
114	13	"Happy Tree Christmas☆"; Transliteration: "Happī Tsurī Kurisumasu" (Japanese: ハッピーツリークリスマス☆)	December 25, 2014
After Hinaki receives her Premium Dress from Kayoko, the girls focus on the preparations for the Christmas Party. Both Akari and Juri reminisce about three years ago, when Ichigo and her friends cut down a large Christmas tree to cheer up their fellow student, with Akari taking up the challenge of cutting down another tree in the same way. With help from Tsubasa, Akari and the others get permission to get a tree from Angely Mountain. Much like Ichigo did before, Akari and the others eventually cut down the tree and ride it down the mountainside while Karen, who was filming there at the time, helps to carry it back to Starlight Academy. The girls decorate the tree before performing together on the Christmas Stage.
115	14	"Unwind Japanese New Year"; Transliteration: "Hokkori Kazumasatsuki" (Japanese: ほっこり☆和正月)	January 8, 2015
With her family on vacation, Juri joins Akari and her family in celebrating the New Year, where Akari becomes a little embarrassed by her parents' obsession with soil. After reminiscing over some childhood photos, the girls visit the local shrine, where Juri notices Akari is more like her father than she was willing to admit.
116	15	"Ōzora Jump!!" (Japanese: 大空JUMP!!)	January 15, 2015
With the start of the new semester, Akari makes a New Year's resolution to find something she is good at. To this end, Akari decides to audition to become a weather girl, with Sumire and the others helping her to train. Later, Aoi arranges for Akari to meet TV weather girl Ayaka Kohashi, who teaches her about what goes on behind the scenes of a weather report and how different types of weather mean different things to different people. Despite knowing how tough being a weather girl is, Akari decides to give her best in her audition and ends up winning the job.
117	16	"Sumire-Colored Singing Voice"; Transliteration: "Utagoe wa Sumire-iro" (Japanese: 歌声はスミレ色)	January 22, 2015
As Akari begins her job as a weather girl, Sumire decides she needs to find her own speciality too. However, Sumire gets a throat cold just as she receives word of a shampoo girl audition, which seems to favor her beauty rather than her singing talent. While wondering if Akari should become a model instead of a singer, Sumire learns of a CD debut audition being held on the same day as the shampoo audition. Worried about Sumire, Akari meets her sister, who tells her that Sumire should make her own decisions. With Sumire still conflicted over which audition to go for, Akari brings back her sister's special herbal tea recipe to help Sumire with her cold. Encouraged by Akari's words, Sumire turns down the shampoo audition and instead goes for the singing one, which she passes.
118	17	"An Elegant Aikatsu!"; Transliteration: "Miyabi na Aikatsu!" (Japanese: みやびなアイカツ!)	January 29, 2015
Yuu goes off on a month-long exchange program with Himezakura Girls Academy in Kyoto, who send one of their own students, Miyabi Fujiwara, to Starlight Academy in her place. Despite being skilled in various Aikatsu! activities, Miyabi seems concerned by her teacher's words to observe the other idols and discover her true self. After spending time training with Akari and the others, Miyabi states her main concern that she has not been able to find any other idols that are like her. However, Akari points out this is a good thing, as her unique personality is what makes her a one-of-a-kind idol, which helps Miyabi realize what her teacher meant.
119	18	"The Nadeshiko's Dance!"; Transliteration: "Nadeshiko no Mai!" (Japanese: ナデシコの舞い!)	February 5, 2015
Miyabi meets a fan of hers named Tomoyo who feels downhearted because of her boyish looks, feeling she cannot be "cute" than she considers Miyabi to be. Wanting to help her out but not knowing how, Miyabi and the others look into the history of idols. Later, Miyabi is asked to perform in a Yamato Nadeshiko Idol Festival alongside Sakura, who tells her about how becoming an idol expanded her horizons. The next day, Miyabi watches Akari's weather report, where she talks about how grateful she was to have taken that one courageous step. Inspired by her peers, Miyabi sends out a social post encouraging Tomoyo to take a step forward. After her performance at the festival, Miyabi is greeted by Tomoyo, who could bring herself to wear a girly outfit, becoming grateful to have become an idol.
120	19	"Star Valentine"; Transliteration: "Sutā Barentain" (Japanese: スター☆バレンタイン)	February 12, 2015
With literally truckloads of chocolate arriving from fans for Valentine's Day, Orihime announces a "Thanks, Valentine" event to show not one piece gets disliked, with cafeteria chef Shun Yotsuba put in charge as head patissier. Later, Akari and the others learn from one of Yotsuba's fans that he was once a male idol who retired to become a chef. Inspired by his fans' appreciation, Yotsuba decides to make a large chocolate tower, while Akari tries to think of a way to let his fans know how he is doing. During the event, where Kayako gives Hinaki her Premium cards, Ichigo – who was approached by Akari the previous night – brings Yotsuba up for an interview for his fans, who are happy that he is accomplishing his dream.
121	20	"A Promise to the Future!"; Transliteration: "Mirai ni Yakusoku!" (Japanese: 未来に約束!)	February 19, 2015
With only three days remaining before Miyabi must return to Kyoto, Akari and the others make plans for a proper send-off. Meanwhile, as Miyabi is offered a stage for her final day, she decides she wants to compete against Sakura in order to challenge herself. While struggling to come up with what to write for Miyabi's farewell banner, Akari comes across Miyabi and Sakura doing some naginata sparring. As Akari becomes downhearted about Miyabi's pending departure, Sakura tells her about the experiences she learned when Ichigo went abroad three years ago, assuring her that their hearts will always be connected no matter how far apart they are. On the day of the concert, which Miyabi wears Starlight's uniform to, Sakura ends up winning the concert, but the crowd remains impressed by Miyabi's performance. After the send-off party, Akari and the others send Miyabi off with a banner assuring her that they will meet again someday.
122	21	"Vampire Mystery"; Transliteration: "Vanpaia Misuterī" (Japanese: ヴァンパイアミステリー)	February 26, 2015
Akari and friends get together to watch a mystery film that they starred in together. When Sumire Gelato is abducted by the vampire Yurika, vampire hunter Jurius Caesar Salada is sent to Starlight Academy to investigate. Meanwhile, Sumire – who has been made into a vampire by Yurika – targets her friend Akari Sunshine, inviting her and reporter Hinaki Twister to a secret party. There, they are attacked by even more vampire idols, with Orihime explaining that she had hoped the idols would become eternal, only to learn they can never enter the spotlight. Just as Akari is cornered, Juri and Orihime arrive with garlic-flavored donuts that turn the vampires back into regular idols.
123	22	"Spring Bouquet"; Transliteration: "Haru no Būke" (Japanese: 春のブーケ)	March 5, 2015
As Tsubasa struggles to come up with a design for his next Premium Dress, Akari's popularity as a weather presenter earns her a stage during a concert being planned by her TV channel, feeling she needs to up her game to earn the right to wear the Premium Dress. After getting some inspiration from Ichigo, Akari brings along her favorite book, Thumbelina, to her weather report to complete the tulips her partner Ozorotter has been growing. This also inspires Tsubasa to make a Thumbelina Bouquet Coord dress, which he shows to Ichigo and Amahane before giving it to Akari to use in her concert.
124	23	"The Queen's Flower"; Transliteration: "Kuīn no Hana" (Japanese: クイーンの花)	March 12, 2015
The Starlight Queen Cup is moved up to spring, with the entire middle school section eligible to participate. As the girls are asked by Otome to help her move out of her current dorm, which is reserved for the next Starlight Queen, Sakura, who had previously lost against Otome, keep her distance, feeling she does not have the right to enter the dorm just yet. While training hard, Sakura receives some encouragement from Otome to bloom like a flower. On the day of the Cup, Akari and the others are eliminated in the first round. Sakura goes on to become the Starlight Queen, after which everyone throws a celebration for her.
125	24	"The Other Side of Admiration"; Transliteration: "Akogare no Mukōgawa" (Japanese: あこがれの向こう側)	March 19, 2015
Soleil announce they will be launching a half-year long nationwide tour in spring, setting up a project room at Starlight Academy to plan the tour. Hearing about how they have worked hard to arrange their schedules so they can find time to plan together, Akari and the others decide to help out with what they can. As planning and training continues, Ichigo and the others reveal their true dream beyond the tour itself: to keep Soleil going as a group for as long as possible. With Akari focusing on her own dream to become as great an idol as Ichigo, Soleil kick things off with their opening concert and soon set off on their dream tour.
126	25	"A Warm Off-time"; Transliteration: "Pokkapoka Ofu Taimu" (Japanese: ぽっかぽか♪オフタイム)	March 26, 2015
With Akari, Sumire, and Hinaki on their long-awaited off-time, Akari suggests they go on a camping trip at the Dreamy Lake near Tsubasa's headquarters. Upon arriving, the girls are greeted by Tsubasa, who ends up helping them with pretty much everything. As the girls discuss how they are all aiming to be Starlight Queen, they become downhearted when Tsubasa points out how that makes them rivals. Wanting to know what it means to be rivals, the girls compete against each other in various activities, finding that there is even fun in competition. Upon returning to the academy as second-year students, the girls are asked to perform in a concert for the new freshmen.
127	26	"Starry Sky Entrance"; Transliteration: "Hoshizora Entoransu" (Japanese: 星空エントランス☆)	April 2, 2015
As the second year begins, Akari and Sumire are assigned as the respective mentors of two new freshmen; Rin Kurosawa, a skilled dancer who admires Johnny, and Madoka Amahane, the granddaughter of Angely Sugar's designer Asuka Amahane, while Naoto becomes the freshmen's new homeroom teacher. Rin and Madoka becomes roommates and instantly get along, deciding to enter together in a pair audition for the freshmen. When the two girls practice, Rin tells Madoka about how she got into street dance, stating the most important thing is to have fun rather than focus on the difference in skill. Enjoying their audition together, Rin and Madoka eventually won, starting off their idol activities.
128	27	"Showtime of Dreams"; Transliteration: "Yume no Shōtaimu" (Japanese: 夢のショータイム)	April 9, 2015
When Rin gets an offer to appear in a dance event, she decides to get a Premium Dress from her favorite brand, Dance Fusion, whose top designer, Sonny, used to be in a dance unit with Johnny. Rin goes with Akari go to meet with Sonny, who becomes impressed by her dance moves and gives her the Soul Marionette Premium Coord, though Rin becomes upset when he tells her he won't be dancing with Johnny again. After Johnny tells her to think about what makes a team, Rin observes Akari and the others, understanding that even though everyone has different careers and paths, they are still friends who help each other out. As Rin performs with renewed determination, Sonny comes to watch her performance and reunites with Johnny.
129	28	"Talk Show Runway"; Transliteration: "Tōku no Hanamichi" (Japanese: トークの花道)	April 16, 2015
Akari, Sumire, and Hinaki are set to appear together on a popular talk show. However, after meeting the show's host, Maguro, Akari has doubts she will be able to keep up a conversation with him on the real thing. In preparation for the show, the girls help each other fill out pre-questionnaires for the show's topic, while Otome teaches them how to keep their conversations short but impactful. On the day of the photoshoot, the girls notice how hard Maguro works to keep his talk show fresh. With the show mixing the pre-planned topics with some of the conversation held just beforehand, the show proves to be a big hit.
130	29	"Unit Magic"; Transliteration: "Yunitto no Mahō" (Japanese: ユニットの魔法)	April 23, 2015
When asked to form an idol unit for her next single, Sumire decides to ask Rin to become her partner, feeling that the new song fits Rin's dancing ability perfectly. As the pair train for their single's debut concert, Rin tries too hard to live up to Sumire's expectations and ends up spraining her ankle, resulting in Johnny forbidding her from further dance training until it heals up. Feeling guilty for dragging Sumire down, Rin suggests that she choose someone else to partner with. Not willing to give up on the unit, Sumire decides to perform the concert by herself and have Rin coach her on her dancing, carrying both of their spirits on stage, after which she announces Rin as her partner to shine alongside with.
131	30	"The Radiant Dancing Diva"; Transliteration: "Kagayaki no Danshingu Dīva" (Japanese: 輝きのダンシングディーヴァ)	April 30, 2015
After Sumire and Rin name their new unit Dancing Diva, they are approached by the same shampoo company who approached Sumire before, who want to use their song for their next commercial. The girls soon begin a hectic schedule, with Sumire giving Rin plenty of advice for her recording and vice versa. Later, Sumire helps out some more as an autograph session proves more popular than expected. On the night before their promotional concert, Sumire comes to understand that the full magic of a unit comes from shining alongside your partner. As Dancing Diva makes a great impression with their first true concert, Juri wonders who her partner will be.
132	31	"The Burning Passionate Jalapeño!"; Transliteration: "Shakunetsu no Jōnetsu Harapēnyo!" (Japanese: 灼熱の情熱ハラペーニョ!)	May 7, 2015
Juri tries to search for a partner for her own unit, but finds herself turned down by everyone she asks. As Hinaki helps Juri search for a partner that contrastly complements her like a chocolate-covered potato chip, Akari and Madoka notice that the two seem perfect for each other. After receiving a push from them, Juri and Hinaki realise they are ideal partners and form their new unit, Passion Jalapeño.
133	32	"Hello New World"; Transliteration: "Harō Nyū Wārudo" (Japanese: ハローニューワールド)	May 14, 2015
With Sumire busy with Dancing Diva, she asks Akari to watch over Madoka, who is offered a gig. Madoka wants an Angely Sugar Premium Dress for her performance, but is reluctant about asking her grandmother for one as she doesn't feel she is worthy enough. Akari decides to spend the next week training with Madoka to build her self-confidence, assuring her that even the pros aren't perfect when it comes to being confident. Strengthening her resolve, Madoka decides to climb up to Angely Sugar's headquarters the hard way and makes her request to Asuka, who recognises her resolve and gives her the Angel Alice Coord.
134	33	"Spontaneous Skips"; Transliteration: "Omowazusu Sukippuzu" (Japanese: おもわずスキップス♪)	May 21, 2015
Deciding she wants to be in a unit herself, Madoka asks Akari to become her partner, to which she immediately accepts. Jumping straight into meetings to decide the nature of their club, Akari takes Madoka with her as she goes about her daily work schedule, seeing how she interacts with her fans and learning about why she chose her as her partner. Inspired by Madoka's spontaneous skipping, Akari decides to name their unit "Skips". On the day of Skips' debut concert, Tsubasa gives both Akari and Madoka some new cards and special Aikatsuel Bracelets to celebrate their new unit.
135	34	"The World is Centered Around Kokone!"; Transliteration: "Sekai no Chūshin wa Kokone!" (Japanese: 世界の中心はここね！)	May 28, 2015
Yuu goes on another exchange program, this time to Etoile Academy in Kobe, who send over their student, Kokone Kurisu, who is friends with Miyabi. Upon arriving at Starlight Academy, Kokone, used to being the center of attention, becomes downhearted that she's not as well known outside her hometown. She soon cheers up when she encounters Yotsuba, who she admired during his idol days and was her inspritation to become an idol. Upon hearing Yotsuba struggling to come up with a new donut idea, Kokone uses ingredients from her family's sweet shop to create one made using chestnuts and dried fruit, earning respect from her classmates. Afterwards, Kokone holds a concert for her restaurant's new branch opening, looking forward to the vast idol world lying ahead of her.
136	35	"The Name is, Fluffy Sweet Nadeshiko"; Transliteration: "Sono Na mo, AmaFuwa Nadeshiko" (Japanese: その名も、あまふわ☆なでしこ)	June 4, 2015
Following the formation of so many units, Orihime announces a Unit Cup for both existing and new units. Wanting to enter the event herself, Kokone invites Miyabi over to be her unit partner, naming their unit Fluffy Sweet Nadeshiko. However, the two get into an argument when Miyabi has qualms about Kokone trying to push cute dresses on her, feeling don't suit her. As the others hear each party out, they learn about what they thought of each other during their first meeting. Afterwards, the two apologise to each other, with Miyabi agreeing to wear the cute dress for their debut performance.
137	36	"Exciting Unit Cup"; Transliteration: "Waku-waku Yunitto Kappu" (Japanese: ワクワク☆ユニットカップ)	June 11, 2015
As the Unit Cup gets underway, it is revealed that, in addition to their stage performances, the participating units will also be ranked on backstage reports conducted in between performances. After Dancing Diva interview Passion Jalapeno following their performance, Kokone ends up getting hiccups, so the other idols get together to cure them in time for Fluffy Sweet Nadeshiko's performance. Meanwhile, some underclassman working behind the scenes mistake a delivery of cards from Tsubasa for a gift from the fans, leaving Akari and Madoka with no dresses for their upcoming performance.
138	37	"Unadorned Brilliance"; Transliteration: "Sugao no Kagayaki" (Japanese: 素顔の輝き☆)	June 18, 2015
With only a matter of time til their performance, Akari and Madoka search their room for their missing cards with no such luck. When Hinaki and Juri come over to do their report on Skips, they deduce that the cards got mixed up with the gifts, which were taken back to the Academy. Sorting through the presents with the help of everyone else, which is filmed as part of the backstage report, Akari manages to find the cards just in time for their performance. Following everyone's performances, Skips are announced as the winners of the Unit Cup, managing to outshine Dancing Diva thanks to the points earned from their backstage dedication.
139	38	"Johnny and the Bride"; Transliteration: "Jonī to Hanayome" (Japanese: ジョニーと花嫁)	June 25, 2015
After Akari and Sumire are requested for a wedding-themed event, they overhear Johnny discussing an upcoming wedding over the phone, jumping to the conclusion that he's getting married. Curious about Johnny's assumed bride, the girls follow him to Dream Academy, where they meet with Seira and the other DreAca students and hear about how their careers have been going, before spotting Johnny dancing with Tiara, assuming she is the bride in question. Wanting to congratulate Johnny, Akari and Sumire agree to perform a concert at the wedding. There, they discover the one getting married is actually Johnny's younger sister, Elisa, with Johnny having merely taken lessons from Tiara in order to dance with her.
140	39	"Aikatsu Restaurant"; Transliteration: "Aikatsu Resutoran" (Japanese: アイカツレストラン)	July 2, 2015
Akari and the other idols all star in a broadcast play, in which Juri and Madoka run a failing restaurant that is struggling to get any customers. It is then that Kokone, a super waitress, arrives offering to help the restaurant get back on its feet, calling in the fortune teller Sumire, who prophesises that the restaurant has forgotten something important. After Akari the detective is called in, Juri confesses that the restaurant's most popular menu item, omelettes, was removed because she can't match her father's recipe. The next one called in is food critic Hinaki, who tests Juri's honor as a chef before trying her food, offering to write and article about them. As Juri that removing the omelettes might be what caused her to lose her customers, Akari finds a bell originally used for her orders that was given to Miyabi, who asks Juri to make an omelette for her, finding it tasting the same as her father's. With the omelettes returning to the menu, the restaurant once again becomes packed with customers.
141	40	"Hot Spicy Girls!"; Transliteration: "Hotto Supaishī Gāruzu!" (Japanese: ホットスパイシー・ガールズ！)	July 9, 2015
Hinaki and Juri are hired to be image girls for a Mexican food booth at a world food festival. While helping with the booth's preparations, Hinaki suggests calling in Juri's father, Kamino Serio, to make a special dish using jalapenos, among many other ideas. Later, after giving Kayako suggestions on how to improve her new Premium Dress, Hinaki reflects on how much she has changed in terms of expressing her ideas thanks to meeting the other idols. On the day of the festival, Hinaki's ideas prove to be a great success for the Mexican Booth, which wins the festival.
142	41	"I Want to Say Thank You"; Transliteration: "Arigatō ga Iitakute" (Japanese: ありがとうが言いたくて)	July 16, 2015
As the end of her transfer program approaches, Kokone seems defiant about Akari and the others holding a send-off party for her, leading them to think that she doesn't want to leave. Working with Yotsuba, Kokone holds her own thank-you party for everyone at the Academy, stating that she wanted to be the one to give her thanks to everyone. Nonetheless, Akari and the others use what they had planned to make the party a special farewell for Kokone.
143	42	"Horror!? Summer Island"; Transliteration: "Senritsu!? Samā Airando" (Japanese: 戦慄！？サマーアイランド)	July 23, 2015
After Orihime gives Akari and the others a day off for summer vacation, Naoto arranges for them to spend a day on an island, which turns out to be the same island where Akari faced her hellish boot camp. While camping out under a squall, Sumire shares a rumor about a mysterious ape man, which the girls start to believe after both Naoto and the boat go missing somewhere. As the girls go on a search for Naoto, finding several of his items along the way, they eventually find a group of monkeys who had rummaged their luggage. Naoto safely returns afterwards, having taken the boat to retrieve a beach ball Akari had left behind.
144	43	"The Great Candid Idol Operation"; Transliteration: "Dokkiri Aidoru Daisakusen" (Japanese: ドッキリアイドル大作戦)	July 30, 2015
Akari and Hinaki participate in a hidden camera show in which they must try and spring a surprise on Sumire. After their initial pranks fail to provoke any kind of reaction from Sumire, the girls try using raw fish to spook her, only to discover that she had learned how to manage them since last time. Just as the girls prepare their final trick, a booby-trapped bench, a sheep breaks loose from a petting zoo, prompting Sumire to stop it before it hurts itself. After explaining everything to Sumire, Akari inadvertently lands on the booby trapped bench herself, which turns out to be what provokes a reaction from Sumire, who was worried about Akari's safety. Afterwards, Sumire receives a new dress and a bracelet from Maya as a final surprise.
145	44	"Hot Summer Festival"; Transliteration: "Atsui Natsumatsuri" (Japanese: アツい夏祭り)	August 6, 2015
Rin and Madoka look forward to attending a summer festival wearing yukatas designed by Suzuha, also being joined by Juri. As the girls enjoy the sights of the festival, Rin and Madoka become curious when they overhear Juri talk about going on a date and decide to follow her, eventually learning she is just meeting up with her father, while Tsubasa and the teacher enjoy a guy's night out.
146	45	"The Three of Us Once Again"; Transliteration: "Mō Ichido San'nin de" (Japanese: もういちど三人で)	August 13, 2015
With the Aikatsu8 Election results drawing hear, Akari speaks with Ichigo, who had just returned to Starlight Academy, hearing about her desire to get all of Soleil into Aikatsu8 this time around, whilst also stating those who don't get chosen still have a chance to shine on their own. The next day, the eight chosen idols are announced to be Ichigo, Mizuki, Ran, Aoi, Sakura, Yurika, Sumire, and Akari. Afterwards, Soleil announces the Great Starlight School Festival, a special event for three-person units.
147	46	"The Dazzling Luminas"; Transliteration: "Kagayaki no Ruminasu" (Japanese: 輝きのルミナス)	August 20, 2015
Hinaki decides to join Akari and Sumire for their three person unit, wanting to become more passionate after losing out on the Aikatsu8. After doing some model shoots for Kayoko, Hinaki is a bit concerned when she is asked to retake them, only to learn that Kayoko wants her to demonstrate a new Fine Drum Coord that she made just for her. The next day, the girls find Hinaki's photo used on a giant billboard and praise how bright she shines, inspiring Hinaki to name their unit Luminas.
148	47	"Raise the Curtain, the Great Starlight School Festival"; Transliteration: "Kaimaku, Dai Sutāraito Gakuen-sai☆" (Japanese: 開幕、大スターライト学園祭☆)	August 27, 2015
As PowaPowa Puririn prepare for the Great Starlight School Festival, Shion learns that the recording schedule for the movie she is starring conflicts with their concert, but becomes determined to attend both. Hearing how hard Shion is working, Hinaki decides to show her support and goes to the mountains, where Shion is training for her role as a ninja. On the day of the festival's first round, Otome and Sakura place their faith in Shion and wait for her to arrive, allowing them to perform as a trio as planned. During their performance, they are joined by Seira and the other Dream Academy idols, who give a video performance.
149	48	"Our Different Colors"; Transliteration: "Fuzoroi no Karā-tachi" (Japanese: ふぞろいのカラーたち)	September 3, 2015
Madoka, Rin, and Juri decide to form a unit together, but soon become concerned that their preferences and styles clash with each other. Looking for a way to feel united, the girl meet up with Encierro's disciple, Atsurou Muleta, who offers to make them unit dresses. However, Atsurou struggles to come up with a design that unifies the girls all together. While having different meals for their lunch, the girls realise that it is their differing personalities that make their unit special, also encouraging Atsurou to be more calm and cool rather than force himself to be passionate. Using this, Atsurou is able to make a design that unifies the girls while also highlighting their differences, while the girls name their new unit Vanilla Chilli Pepper.
150	49	"The Bond Between Stars"; Transliteration: "Hoshi no Kizuna" (Japanese: 星の絆)	September 10, 2015
As Luminas work to improve themselves before the festival, Kaede approaches Yurika about entering the festival as Tristar. While initially believing it to be impossible, Yurika eventually realizes from spending time with Powa Powa Puririn that she wants to reform Tristar too. After being approached by Kaede and Yurika, Mizuki feels the same way and gets Orihime's okay to reform Tristar. Before Tristar's first performance following their reunion, Mizuki spends some time reminiscing with Ichigo before being greeted by Mikuru. Awed by their concert, Luminas becomes even more determined to perfect their unit appeal before their concert.
151	50	"Light of the Stage"; Transliteration: "Sutēji no Hikari" (Japanese: ステージの光)	September 17, 2015
Both Soleil and Luminas are lined up for the final day of the festival, with Akari and the others struggling to nail their unit appeal. Nonetheless, with Akari's optimistic outlook, the girls train until the last minute, finally managing to perfect their appeal. On the day of their concerts, Luminas manage to pull off their until appeal while Soleil once again stun with their performance. With the festival at its ends, Vanilla Chilli Pepper is ranked fifth, PowaPowa Puririn fourth, Tristar third, and Luminas second, with Soleil declared the overall winners. After the event, Akari, despite feeling frustrated over not winning, feels the experience was worth it and looks forward to what awaits her and the others.
152	51	"The Road Following the Encounter"; Transliteration: "Deai ni Tsuzuku Michi" (Japanese: 出会いに続く道)	September 24, 2015
Wanting to challenge themselves, Akari, Sumire, and Hinaki decide to take Luminas on a nationwide tour. After they manage to get Orihime's approval, the girls receive help from their friends to decide on the theme of their tour; encounters. Getting permission to use the academy's private wagon van for their tour, the three girls ask Vanilla Chilli Pepper to join them in a special concert to kick off their tour as a gratitude for their help. Luminas soon sets off on their tour, setting their sights on becoming the next Starlight Queen.
