= Aikatsu Stars! season 2 =

Aikatsu Stars!
- Season 2
- No. of episodes: 50

Release
- Original network: TV Tokyo
- Original release: April 6, 2017 – March 29, 2018

Season chronology
- ← Previous; Aikatsu Stars! season 1 Next → Aikatsu Friends! season 1

The following is a list of episodes for the second season of Sunrise' Aikatsu Stars! anime television series, which aired on TV Tokyo between April 6, 2017, and March 29, 2018.

The opening themes are "STARDOM!" and "MUSIC OF DREAM!!!", both by Sena, Rie, Kana and Miki - while the ending themes are "Bon Bon Voyage" by Miho from AIKATSU✩STARS and Risa, as well as "Pirouette of the Forest Light" by Sena and Ruka from AIKATSU✩STARS.

== Episode list ==
No.	Season No.	Title	Original release date
51	1	"Perfect Idol Elsa"; Transliteration: "Pāfekuto Aidoru Eruza" (Japanese: パーフェクトアイドル エルザ)	April 6, 2017
A new school year begins with Yume now a fully-fledged S4 member alongside Ako, Mahiru, and Yuzu. As Yume launches her new brand, Berry Parfait, Ako is shocked to learn that the brand she was hoping to pair up with, Fuwafuwa Dream, has instead announced a contract with Kirara Hanazono, an idol from the ship-based idol school Venus Ark. As the girls go to Venus Ark to investigate the matter, Rola hears a familiar voice aboard before the girls are kicked out. Upon returning to Yotsuboshi Academy, Yume is approached by Venus Ark's owner and top idol, Elza Forte, along with her secretary Rei Kizaki, who seeks to scout Yume in order to recruit Hime as well. Using the strength of her Star Premium Rare Coord, Elza puts on a powerful performance fitting of her reputation as "Perfect Elsa". After hearing Hime acknowledge Elza as the world's top idol, Yume rejects Elza's offer to join Venus Ark, becoming excited about what Aikatsu lies in store.
52	2	"The Targeted Idol!?"; Transliteration: "Nerawareta Aidoru!?" (Japanese: 狙われたアイドル!?)	April 13, 2017
As the threat of Venus Ark looms over the school, Yume and Rola decide to put on a show for the first year students. While trying to decide on a dress, Yume hears from Elza about how she obtained her Venus Star Premium Rare Coord, but becomes annoyed at her when she insults Rola's talent from just a glance. Putting the enjoyment of the first years over trying to show up Elza, Yume and Rola put on a fun performance wearing the same outfits as the first years, showing them how far they can come. As Elza comes out of the show with a renewed interest in both Yume and Rola, Hime informs Yume that she is going on a leave of absence to find what she is lacking. Meanwhile, it is revealed that Koharu is working aboard the Venus Ark.
53	3	"Open Sesame! Obtain the Star Wings!"; Transliteration: "Ōpun Sesami! Hoshi no Tsubasa o Te ni Irero!" (Japanese: オープンセサミ!星のツバサを手に入れろ!)	April 20, 2017
In trying to come up with a dress idea to rival Elza's Star Wings, Yume is told by her brand owner to think about what she herself would enjoy. While trying to find her answer, she comes across Lily, who has decided to make the Premium Rare Dress she had sealed away before in order to obtain the Star Premium Rare Coord. As Yume and Yuzu both help her with her training, Lily finds inspiration from a bird and manages to complete her new dress, the Rosetta Thorn Coord, which is granted its own set of Star Wings.
54	4	"Kirara ☆ The Fluffy Idol"; Transliteration: "Kirara, Fuwafuwa~ na Aidoru" (Japanese: きらら☆フワフワ～なアイドル」)	April 27, 2017
Wanting to take back Fuwafuwa Dream from Kirara, Ako sneaks into their headquarters with Yume and competes with Kirara to design the brand's new Premium Rare Dress. Despite Ako's efforts, Kirara's design proves to have the more impact, with Elza stating that what both Ako and Yume need is more than just creativity. Wanting to find what that is, Yume and Ako attend Kirara's concert, where she is granted Star Wings as well, realising that she is working hard to deliver the brand's message rather than just create a great dress. Afterwards, Yuzu and Moroboshi arrange for Yume, Mahiru, and Rola to become exchange students at Venus Ark so they can study up on Star Premium Dresses.
55	5	"All Aboard ☆ Venus Ark!"; Transliteration: "Itchao, Vīnasu Āku!" (Japanese: 行っちゃお☆ヴィーナスアーク！)	May 4, 2017
Upon arriving at Venus Ark, Yume, Rola, and Mahiru are greeted by Koharu, who explains how she was scouted as a designer by Elza during her studies in Italy. As the girls are given a tour, they discover that Elza's Aikatsu involves forcing her individuality onto her students in order to awaken their true individuality. After Elza and Kirara give a joint performance, Koharu gives the girls her support, encouraging them to face Venus Ark head on.
56	6	"Kya! Warning☆"; Transliteration: "Kya! to Chūihō" (Japanese: キャッ!と注意報)	May 11, 2017
While doing modelling work, Mahiru hears about a mysterious model known as Shooting Star who vanished from the public eye one day. Back at the Venus Ark, Mahiru takes an interest in Rei after she uses kendo skills to stop her cat Miranda from stealing food, clashing with her own ideal that karate is the greatest martial art. Just as the two prepare to face against each other, they are alerted to an intruder sneaking aboard the ark. Using some advice from Rei similar to that she received during her shoot, Mahiru manages to catch the intruder, who turns out to be Ako trying to find out Kirara's weakness. Later, after Elsa performs at a welcoming party, the girls learn Koharu is designing the dresses for Elza's brand, while it is hinted that Rei is Shooting Star herself.
57	7	"Shining ☆ A Good Day For a Stroll"; Transliteration: "Kirakira ☆ Osanpo Biyori" (Japanese: キラキラ☆お散歩日和)	May 18, 2017
Looking to relieve some boredom, Kirara decides to tag along with Yume and Rola as they do a report show on various spots around town. Although Kirara's own reporting proves to be quite erratic compared to Yume and Rola's, the three manage to make an interesting show out of it. The tour rounds off with a trip to the park, where Tsubasa is holding a stage for first-year idols from Yotsuboshi Academy. Just then, they get word from Anna that the performing idols are running late. Believing that the spotlight belongs to the first years, Yume and Rola reject Kirara's request to let her perform in their place and instead call in as much help as they can to buy time until they arrive. As Rola shows Kirara there is more to being an idol than claiming the spotlight for yourself, Tsubasa makes the decision to go to Hollywood, choosing Rola to inherit her Spice Chord brand.
58	8	"Miracle Audition!"; Transliteration: "Mirakuru Ōdishon!" (Japanese: ミラクルオーディション!)	May 25, 2017
Koukadou holds another audition for a new campaign unit, which Yume, Lily, Elza, and Kirara all receive invitations to. Both Yume and Elza's teams reach the finals, which consists of a baking contest. While Yume and Lily present a matcha roll cake, Elza and Kirara present a French Doll cake that holds emotional value to the company president, winning the contest.
59	9	"Shine For You"; Transliteration: "Anata ni Mo Kagayaki o" (Japanese: あなたにも輝きを)	June 1, 2017
As Yume struggles to come up with a Premium Rare Dress for her brand due to her busy schedule, Koharu decides to hold a fishing contest for a change of pace. Following the contest, Koharu injures herself after falling into the ocean and is taken to the hospital, where Yume meets some young fans. One of the fans takes Yume to see her hospitalized sister, Suzu, helping Yume to remember the feeling she had when first putting on an idol dress. Despite her premiere Berry Coord not being granted any Star Wings, Yume feels content that her feelings have reached her audience.
60	10	"Stop Contact! A Day in the World of Elsa Forte"; Transliteration: "Micchaku! Eruza Forute no Sekai" (Japanese: 密着!エルザフォルテの世界)	June 8, 2017
Yume and the others decide to do a feature on Elza for S4's show, during which they are escorted by a first-year student named Alice Caroll. Just as the feature gets underway, Elza suddenly tells Alice that she is to be expelled at the end of the day due to her declining popularity. Reflecting on her own experiences of almost being expelled, Yume assures Alice that leaving Venus Ark does not mean the end for her idol career. As the feature continues, Yume interviews Rei and Koharu, learning that it was Elza's brutal honesty that made them follow her. At the end of the day, Alice leaves Venus Ark with her head held high, showing Elza a glimmer that she thought had disappeared.
61	11	"Feelings of Love!"; Transliteration: "Suki! tte Kimochi" (Japanese: 好き!って気持ち)	June 15, 2017
Ako is excited to be starring in a drama alongside Subaru, but struggles to keep her composure in front of him during a confession scene with him. As Ako spends the day with Yume, Subaru, and Kanata to get used to being around Subaru, Asahi misinterprets Ako reading of her script as her wanting to quit being an idol and informs Rola and Mahiru, who follow Ako on her outing. As Rola and Mahiru continue to misinterpret the situation, Ako runs off when Kirara blurts out her feelings for Subaru in front of everyone. While Yume clears up the confusion with the others, Kanata assures Ako that love is nothing to be ashamed about, allowing her to perform her scene with Subaru flawlessly.
62	12	"With Going My Way ♪"; Transliteration: "Gōingu Mai Wei de ♪" (Japanese: ゴーイング・マイウェイで♪)	June 22, 2017
Tsubasa announces her plans to study abroad before informing Rola that she will inherit Spice Chord on the condition that she pass a series of tests. The first test has her overcoming her fear of heights by doing a bungie jump, followed by a test of her coordination sense. Her final test tasks her with handing out a mountain of taiyaki in a practically deserted town within an hour. Despite the overwhelming odds, Rola manages to use her charm and appeal to draw in customers. After asking Rola one final question, Tsubasa declares her worthy of inheriting the Spice Chord brand and sets off for America.
63	13	"A Hot Wind From the Tundra"; Transliteration: "Tsundora kawa Fuku Atsui Kaze" (Japanese: ツンドラから吹く熱い風)	June 29, 2017
As S4 are each given surprise one-day jobs for their program, Lily decides to becomes a guide for a fan tour to Suzukaze Plateau in leau of resting at her summer retreat. When a late participant causes the tour group to miss a direct train to Suzukaze Plateau, Ako, who is working as a station attendant for the day, provides Lily with an alternate route using local trains. After Mahiru, working as a lunch lady, helps provide replacement lunches for those lost in the confusion, the train breaks down but Yuzu manages to use her job to provide helicopter lifts for everyone. They make it through stormy weather thanks to Yume's weather report, only to discover the Plateau, along with the lights for her planned stage, has been hit by a blackout. The built up stress from this string of bad events causes Lily to faint, during which she has a dream about S4 fighting against a dinosaur. When Lily wakes up, she finds her stage lit up by the glowsticks of all of her fans, allowing her performance to go ahead.
64	14	"Wish Upon A Star"; Transliteration: "Hoshi ni Negai o" (Japanese: 星に願いを)	July 6, 2017
With Tanabata approaching, Elza has Rei come out of retirement and resume model work as Shooting Star. While enjoying working alongside S4 on new projects, Rei is downhearted when Elza tells her there is still something she is lacking. As Rei tells the others how she gave up on polishing her own talent as a performer after witnessing Elza's brilliance, Yume and Mahiru state how seeing bright stars simply motivates them to shine even brighter. Invited to see Mahiru's fashion show, Rei comes across Yozora, who explains how Mahiru was able to surpass her due to the strength that comes from having a rival. As Mahiru's dazzling performance earns her a set of her own Star Wings, Rei becomes determined to shine just like her.
65	15	"Hop On ♪ Venus Wave"; Transliteration: "Notte ko ♪ Vīnasu Wēbu" (Japanese: 乗ってこ♪ヴィーナスウェーブ)	July 20, 2017
As Rola begins her duties as Spice Chord's muse and works on her own Premium Rare Dress, she and Yume are invited to be part of a Venus Wave event to increase their Aikatsu Ranking. As the event gets underway, each of the participants are tasked with coordinating with a blank t-shirt to best express their personal brands. During her presentation, Rola expresses her desire to make Spice Chord her own thing before showing off her Rock My Heart coord and earning her own Star Wings.
66	16	"Give an Eel"; Transliteration: "Ēru o Okurou" (Japanese: エールを送ろう)	July 27, 2017
While preparing for her own performance, Yume comes across a young girl named Saya whose friends keep arguing over which idol is better. Hearing Saya's worries, Yume comes up with a plan to help everyone get along with each other. Following Kirara's performance, Yume shows her chord, which demonstrates the best parts of Rola and Kirara's efforts, before putting on a routine where both the idols and audience cheer for each other, helping Saya and her friends to get along. After Yume's performance, Rola is declared the winner of Venus Wave while Saya and her friends give their personal thanks to Yume.
67	17	"Summer! The Pool! A Treasure Hunt☆"; Transliteration: "Natsu da! Pūru da! Takara Sagashi dazo" (Japanese: 夏だ!プールだ!宝探しだゾ☆)	August 3, 2017
Yuzu decides to hold a treasure hunt at the pool for her Shiny Smile brand's Premium Rare Dress premiere. The girls are put into pairs, with Yume paired up with Kirara, Rola with Mahiru, and Ako with Yozora, and are tasked with finding a genuine treasure chest among hundreds of fakes. Meanwhile, Elsa explains to Rei that she is planning to obtain the Sun Dress, a legendary dress that only appears once all nine Star Premium Rare Dresses are obtained. Following the hints given by Lily, Yume deduces that the real treasure chest is the large prop from the start of the hunt, inside of which they find Hime, Yozora, and Tsubasa, who are reforming a group with Yuzu for a limited time. In her dress debut performance, Yuzu obtains the sixth set of Star Wings, leaving just three remaining.
68	18	"Venus Ark's Sca~ry Rumor!"; Transliteration: "Vīnasu Āku no Kowa~i Uwasa!" (Japanese: ヴィーナスアークのこわ～いウワサ!)	August 10, 2017
Venus Ark prepares to hold its proficiency tests, with Kirara sharing a rumor of a forbidden room on the ship where those who fail their tests are locked away. With only a week until the tests, Yume and the others decide to seek out tutors to help them study each of their subjects efficiently. With Lily teaching languages, Ako teaching math, and Yuzu teaching English, each tutor manages to provide fun and efficient ways to study each subject. Meanwhile, rumors about the forbidden room start to spread further as Koharu and Juli allegedly hear a ghost coming from it. Following the languages and math tests, Elsa shakes up the English test by having them conduct English interviews with an American film crew, with Yume and the others using hints from their lessons to make their interview a fun experience. As the girls all pass their exams, Rei investigates the forbidden room, discovering the supposed "ghost" to be Kirara, who spread the rumor herself so she could play video games in secret.
69	19	"Expand, Aikatsu's "WAH"!"; Transliteration: "Hirogeyō, Aikatsu no 「WA」!" (Japanese: 広げよう、アイカツの「WA」!)	August 17, 2017
While en route to preparations for the newest Aikatsu Island event, Yume, Rola, and Mahiru come across three idols from Starlight Academy; Akari Ozora, Sumire Hikami, and Hinaki Shinjō. Akari's gang decides to help Yume's group search for four-leaved clovers to give to Hime and the others for the event, learning more about each other. Meanwhile, Ako and Koharu receive help from chef Shun Yotsuba and fellow M4 fans in locating the remaining clovers. Finally arriving at the event, Yume and the others deliver the clovers to Hime's group, who give their reunion performance, before bringing Akari on stage to express her own Aikatsu.
70	20	"Jungle Activities!"; Transliteration: "Janguru Katsudō!" (Japanese: ジャングルカツドウ!)	August 24, 2017
While kayaking in the sea, Yume, Rola, and Koharu get lost in a fog storm and end up on a remote island, where they come across Ichigo Hoshimiya. Ichigo explains that she and her fellow Soleil members, Aoi Kiriya and Ran Shibuki, are competing in an island survival contest against rival group TriStar, formed of Mizuki Kanzaki, Yurika Toudou, and Kaede Ichinose. Getting roped into the contest too, Yume and Koharu end up joining Soleil's team while Rola joins TriStar's team, learning all about each other. After spending the day building a boat for a race taking place the next day, the girls set up a campfire and enjoy a sushi dinner. The next day, Yurika's pet bat Alan goes missing, but Ichigo and Yume manage to find him, enjoying a mountain climb in the process. After Soleil manage to win the boat race, they reveal themselves to be idols from Starlight Academy who put on a show.
71	21	"Goodbye, Koharu-chan!?"; Transliteration: "Sayonara, Koharu-chan!?" (Japanese: さよなら,小春ちゃん!?)	August 31, 2017
Elza tells Koharu that the Venus Ark will be leaving Japan for a tour. Meanwhile, Yume, Rola, and Mahiru, whose exchange programmes aboard the Venus Ark are scheduled to end as a result, assume that they will end up having to part ways with Koharu once again, becoming worried when they can't find her aboard the ship before it departs. Thankfully, Koharu decides to stay behind after being declared a graduate by Elza and re-enrolls in Yotsuboshi Academy with Yume and the others, although Kirara ends up missing her departure. Upon arriving back at Yotsuboshi Academy, where Alice has also enrolled as a student, Yume and Rola put on a performance to welcome Koharu back. As Kirara ends up having to stay with Ako until she can return to the Venus Ark, Koharu states that she wants to help Yume achieve her dream of becoming the brightest star so she can fulfill her own dream of creating that star's dress.
72	22	"Their Brightest Star☆"; Transliteration: "Futari no Ichiban Boshi" (Japanese: 二人の一番星☆)	September 7, 2017
Koharu wants to help Yume design some dresses for Berry Parfait, but can't find the confidence to ask her. As Koharu is asked to appear in a period drama alongside Hime and the others, she grows concerned about Yume taking on a curry commercial gig while also trying to plan a surprise party for the previous S4 members. During her shoot, Koharu ends up helping the production with her ideas and fashion sense. As Yume's work runs longer than expected, leaving her with no time to prepare for the party, Hime and the others learn about the surprise party from Koharu and decide to help with preparations, assuring Koharu that Yume shines not only for herself, but everyone around her. After making sure to give her commercial shoot the best possible smile, Yume is pleased to find the party ready upon her return. After the party, Koharu works up the courage to ask to help with Berry Parfait's designs, which she gladly accepts.
73	23	"Rainbow Dress"; Transliteration: "Niji no Doresu" (Japanese: 虹のドレス)	September 14, 2017
Noticing something off between Yume and Koharu, the other girls learn that they had gotten into an argument about Koharu's dress designs. While Koharu wants her dresses to be impactful, Yume is worried about upsetting Berry Parfait fans by having something too different. Wanting to help the two make up, the girls invite them to their respective jobs, giving them subtle hints on how to create the best dress. After getting caught in the rain, Yume and Koharu recall how they helped support each other when they were little and make up with each other. Inspired by a rainbow, Yume changes Berry Parfait's brand name to Rainbow Berry Parfait and presents the new Rainbow Etoile Coord she made with Koharu, finally earning her own Star Wings.
74	24	"Fluffy Puffy ☆ Friends"; Transliteration: "Fuwamoko Furenzu" (Japanese: ふわもこ☆レンズ)	September 21, 2017
Yume and Koharu are scheduled to appear on a children's animal show hosted by Ako, where Kirara also brings her pet sheep, Caroline. During rehearsals, one of the more stubborn child guests, Tetsuya, kidnaps Caroline with the intention of shaving off her wool, only to get won over by her fluffiness. While the other staff search for them, Kirara proposes putting on a performance with Ako to buy time for the live broadcast. Afterwards, Ako takes on Kirara's offer of joining her as FuwaFuwa Dream's co-muse.
75	25	"The Kasumi Family's Day Off"; Transliteration: "Kasumi-ke no Kyūjitsu" (Japanese: 香澄家の休日)	September 29, 2017
Learning that her parents are finally getting some time off work, Mahiru returns home with Yozora and Asahi to spend some quality family time together. While Yozora and Asahi are called out to sudden jobs, Mahiru is visited by Yume and the others, giving them a tour of her house. Upon heading back to retrieve her phone, Rola finds Mahiru feeling lonely being by herself and gives her some encouragement. Later, Mahiru is asked to come to Ako's aid after Kirara gets stuck in traffic just as her parents arrive, making use of their helicopter to arrive at the event in time. After managing to buy enough time for Kirara to arrive, Mahiru returns home to find the entirety of her family holding her an early birthday party.
76	26	"The Fairy Idol, Aria Futaba♪"; Transliteration: "Yōsei Aidoru Futaba Aria" (Japanese: 妖精アイドル 双葉アリア♪)	October 6, 2017
The girls learn that Hime is passing on her My Little Heart brand to Aria Futaba, an idol who is popular in Finland. Hime has Aria accompany Yume and observe her during a photo shoot, during which Yume learns about Aria's relationship with Hime. Inviting her to join in her shoot, Yume is amazed at how Aria's singing resonates with nature. The next day, Aria gives a performance and immediately earns another set of Star Wings.
77	27	"Through Flower Language♪"; Transliteration: "Hana Kotoba ni Nosete" (Japanese: 花言葉にのせて♪)	October 12, 2017
As the Venus Ark returns to Japan, Aria searches around the ship with Yume and Kirara for some surprising Aikatsu. After helping restore some flowers with her singing, Aria explains how she was approached by Hime to join her around the world. Kirara shows Aria the World Dress room, featuring dresses and dances that Elza has collected from around the world. Wanting to give Aria more excitement, Yume and Hime arrange for Aria to hold her next concert outdoors, surrounded by nature. Afterwards, Elza invites Aria aboard the Venus Ark so she can see more of the world.
78	28	"Welcome Perfect Mother!"; Transliteration: "Yōkoso Pāfekuto Mazā!" (Japanese: ようこそ パーフェクトマザー！)	October 19, 2017
Elza meets her mother, Yukie Grace Forte. Elza has aspired to be like her since her childhood: she was beautiful, shined as brightly as the sun, the world's top idol. She was a perfect woman all round, and was said to be visiting from overseas.
79	29	"Halloween Surprise"; Transliteration: "Harowin Supraizu☆" (Japanese: ハロウィン サプライズ☆)	October 26, 2017
A Halloween night will be held at Four Star Academy, and the idols of Venus Ark will also participate, making it more hectic than usual. Yume and Koharu make a short plan in order to surprise everyone.
80	30	"Rei Kizaki's Oath!"; Transliteration: "Rei Kizaki no Ubau!" (Japanese: 騎咲レイの誓う！)	November 2, 2017
Rei makes a vow to obtain the last set of Star Wings, so that Elza's dream can come true. Putting her confidence and determination forward, she debuts her brand Royal Sword, gaining the final set of star wings, so that the Sun Dress can finally emerge; However, the Sun Dress appears randomly before one of the nine who have obtained star wings.
81	31	"Finding a Nice S"; Transliteration: "Suteki na S o Sagashite" (Japanese: ステキなSを探して)	November 9, 2017
The students of Yottsuboshi Academy begin the shooting for the television program that they are appearing in. Under a time limit, it was supposed to be a show where one has to find a name card starting with letter "S". An intense punishment game called "Coochy-Coo" awaits those who fail to do so.
82	32	"Aikatsu Fall in Love"; Transliteration: "Koisuru Aikatsu" (Japanese: 恋するアイカツ)	November 16, 2017
Yume is in good spirit to obtain the Sun Premium Dress. Appearing to be resuming her Aikatsu! activities immediately after resting, Yume pushes herself a bit too far and realizes that she no longer has an answer for what her favorite thing about Aikatsu! is. Among these events, she and Aria has been invited to co-star with Hime Shiratori on Hime's program.
83	33	"Lillie and the Prince"; Transliteration: "Riryi to Ōji-sama" (Japanese: リリィと王子様)	November 23, 2017
Finally, the school festival has arrived to Four Star Academy, This year, the main focus of Four Star's school festival will be the play starring the members of S4. The chosen play is "Romeo and Juliet", rewritten for the students of Four Star. Venus Ark students Rei Kizaki and Kirara Hanazono appear in order to enjoy their time. Lillie also finds a prince.
84	34	"Dream Together"; Transliteration: "Yume wa Issho ni" (Japanese: 夢は一緒に)	November 30, 2017
In order to move up on the Aikatsu Ranking, Kirara has decided to enter the unit event that has extremely high points with Ako. Kirara is in spirit as usual, for she puts in her best effort in Aikatsu for the sake of Elza. Ako reluctantly agrees to it and joins her. When she tells Elza about this, Elza tells her to do her Aikatsu in a way Kirara herself is pleased. Kirara becomes discouraged before Ako encourages her so that Elza notices her. Before the actual stage, Kirara once again becomes discouraged as Elza is not the audience seat. Ako decides to encourage her to perform for the sake of the fans, not only for Elza. With Kirara regaining confidence, they won the unit event and helped Kirara strengthens her position in her Aikatsu ranking.
85	35	"Passing on the Radiance"; Transliteration: "Kagayaki wo Watasou" (Japanese: 輝きを渡そう)	December 7, 2017
For the sake of moving up Aikatsu! Ranking, for all the upcoming stages, it will be extremely important to acquire the points from performances. Among those who aim to move up the rank, regardless of the fact that Yume has been receiving offers one after another, she has chosen one particular audition to participate in as she takes this stage into her hands.
86	36	"Nothing but the Number of Tears"; Transliteration: "Namida no Kazu dake" (Japanese: 涙の数だけ)	December 14, 2017
In order to move up the Aikatsu! Ranking Rola decides to enter a competition worth a lot of points so that she will have a chance of making the top four. However Elza decides to enter the same competition with the hopes of gaining the Sun dress. Rola is initially reluctant to enter once hearing she'll be competing against Elza but thanks to encouragement from her friends and fans she decides to continue. But when Elza takes the stage, her radiance reaches its peak and she finally gains the Sun Dress, winning the competition. Despite feeling sad over losing, Rola manages to keep smiling and resolves to keep following her dream.
87	37	"Thank You♪ Merry Christmas!"; Transliteration: "Arigatou♪ Merikuri!" (Japanese: ありがとう♪メリクリ！)	December 21, 2017
S4 receive a request to produce this years Christmas festival. Yume and the others come up with ideas for the festival, which include erecting a giant Christmas tree in the town shopping district and performing a show for the shoppers. The idols from Venus Arc also decide to help. Ako overhears that M4 have decided to separate after the new year so that each member can pursue their own goals. Rola also receives an offer to make her world debut.
88	38	"It's New Year ☆ All Members Gathered!"; Transliteration: "Oshougatsu dazo☆ Zen'in shuugou!" (Japanese: お正月だゾ☆全員集合！)	January 4, 2018
S4 realize they have a lot of work to do now that its new year but Yuzu decides to take it on all by herself. After taking on a full day of live program shoots, Yuzu succumbs to the strain and collapses. Lillie forces Yuzu to rest while she and the other idols take care of the final program shoot. However the program appears to be too much for Lillie to handle, but Yuzu comes to her rescue. Both Yuzu and Lillie realize that everyone has something they struggle with, the important thing is to help each other.
89	39	"Diary of the Stars"; Transliteration: "Hoshiboshi no Daiarī" (Japanese: 星々のダイアリー)	January 11, 2018
Elza, Rei and Kirara talk about the past year and how everyone has grown from their experiences. Yume and Aria hold a concert before everyone gathers at Venus Arc to watch the new year fireworks. Yume tells Elza she has set her sights on becoming the first star idol, to which Elza asks her to show how brightly she can shine at the Aikatsu! Ranking final tournament.
90	40	"Venus Crisis"; Transliteration: "Vīnasu Kuraishizu!" (Japanese: ヴィーナス クライシス！)	January 18, 2018
Elza announces that she will be closing Venus Arc after the Aikastsu! Ranking final Tournament, leaving all the idols in distress. Rei confronts Elza, who tells her that she no longer needs the idols anymore. When Rei relays this to Aria and Kirara, Kirara refuses to believe Elza means what she says, vowing to make it to the top four of the Aikatsu! Ranking and make Elza notice her. Kirara, Rei and Aria enter a competition to earn more points and boost their ranking. However one of the tasks involves cooking, which Kirara struggles with. Rei helps her out and after a lot of practice, Kirara is confident she can do it. But on the day of the competition Kirara is given the wrong ingredients by mistake. However, using the lessons Rei taught her she is able to complete the task. The final round is a race between Kirara and Rei, but when Kirara hurts her ankle Rei helps her to the finish line and forces her to cross first. Rei tells Kirara to get her feeling across to Elza.
91	41	"Hustle Idol Training"; Transliteration: "Hassuru Aidoru Shugyō" (Japanese: ハッスル アイドル修行)	January 25, 2018
Kirara suggests to Aria that she should enter an upcoming competition to raise her Aikatsu! Ranking, saying she needs to get serious if she wants to win. Not sure what Kirara means, Aria goes to Four Star Academy to find Hime but ends up running into Mahiru, who is training for the same competition. Mahiru explains to Aria about how she gets serious in her Aikatsu and Aria asks to accompany her on a training camp. Aria learns a valuable lesson from Mahiru and both idols enter the competition. Although Mahiru wins, Aria is still happy that she learned a new way to Aikatsu.
92	42	"Our episode Solo"; Transliteration: "Watashi-tachi no episōdo soro" (Japanese: 私たちのエピソード ソロ)	February 1, 2018
The top four candidates for the Aikatsu! Ranking are announced. Yume and Mahiru from Four Star Academy, and Elza and Rei from Venus Arc. However before the final tournament begins, Yuzu reveals S4 will be having a concert to remember this year's members as she will be graduating this year. With all the preparation, Yume becomes frustrated about what song to sing at the concert, but she is not the only one, as her friends all have things on their minds. Yuzu and the previous members of S4 come to their rescue and help them overcome their problems. Yume gets the idea to use 'Episode Solo' as the song for the concert, even though it's what Hime's S4 sang the previous year. However Hime and Anna both reveal that the song has been passed down through all S4 generations and belongs to them, so they decide to sing it at the concert.
93	43	"The Sword of Light"; Transliteration: "Hikari no Tsurugi" (Japanese: 光の剣)	February 8, 2018
Rei still tries to convince Elza to reconsider closing Venus Arc but to no avail. All the other idols aboard the Arc begin talking of leaving after the way Elza has treated them but Rei tries to convince them to stay. Aria and Kirara help Rei set up a special class for model training hoping to inspire the Venus Arc idols again but no one shows up. On the day of the Final tournament ballot to decide who will face who, Rei is revealed to face Yume, while Mahiru will face Elza. Rei decides to use the opportunity to show the Venus Arc idols she can be their shining light by winning the tournament. Despite putting on a spectacular show, Rei loses to Yume. But the Venus Arc idols finally see how much Rei cares for them and decide to stay a Venus Arc with her.
94	44	"Mahiru's Radiance"; Transliteration: "Mahiru no Kagayaki" (Japanese: 真昼の輝き)	February 15, 2018
Mahiru becomes hesitant about facing Elza in the tournament. Yume and the others manage to convince her that she has her own radiance that she can shine with. Mahiru comes to realize that she was blinded by Elza's radiance and that what she really wants is to compete against Yume. Mahiru performs and everyone agrees she shone more brightly than she ever had before. However Elza still manages to win the round, but Mahiru remains confident that she'll get her wish to face Yume in the future.
95	45	"The Lonely Sun"; Transliteration: "Kodoku na Taiyō" (Japanese: 孤独な太陽)	February 22, 2018
Elza announces that she will quit being an idol once she wins the Aikatsu! Ranking Tournament. Rei decides she's had enough of Elza's selfishness. Unable to convince her to change her mind, Rei goes to Yume for help. Yume says she will try her best but is unsure if she has what she needs to beat Elza. With encouragement from her friends Yume prepares for the final round but is still no closer to figuring out how to beat Elza. During a late night stroll, Yume meets Hime who tells her to just be herself, and that perfection is not the same as being the best. On the day of the final round Elza takes the stage and manages to dazzle the audience once again. But as the time for Yume to take the stage draws near, she suddenly figures out what she needs to beat Elza.
96	46	"Shining Together!"; Transliteration: "Min'na de Kagayaku!" (Japanese: みんなで輝く！)	March 1, 2018
With the support of her friends, Yume prepares to take the stage, but before doing so she speaks to Elza. Elza is firm in her belief that a perfect idol can only shine alone, but Yume feels that an idol shines with the power of everyone who supports her and vows to prove it. When Yume takes the stage she performs the greatest performance of the competition, and to everyone's surprise is awarded her very own Sun Dress. Yume is announced the winner and Elza comes to realize why she lost. Rei, Aria and Kirara turn up with Elza's mother, the three idols having convinced Mrs Forte to come see Elza's performance. Both Elza and her mother reconcile and Elza finally gets the love and affection she's been seeking. Elza also comes to realize how badly she's treated her friends and reconciles with them too. Afterwards Yume celebrates her victory with her friends while Elza, although content that she lost, wonders what she should do now.
97	47	"Bon Bon Voyage！"	March 8, 2018
As Yume gets used to her new world wide fame, Elza is still adamant she will close Venus Ark. However the other idols refuse to leave and after some protesting, Elza realizes what she needs to do next. Elza holds a goodbye concert with Rei, Aria and Kirara, after which she announces she is closing Venus Ark in order to re-imagine the school as a place where anyone who wishes to become an idol can come aboard, rechristening it as Neo Venus Ark. As the ship prepares to leave, Elza says goodbye to Yume, vowing to return one day to defeat her, to which Yume replies that she'll be waiting.
98	48	"Yuzu and Lillie"; Transliteration: "Yuzu tto Riryi" (Japanese: ゆずっとリリィ)	March 15, 2018
As another school year draws to a close, everyone prepares for the upcoming S4 selection. However, Rola announces that she won't be participating this year as she is planning on moving to England to join a music producer called Black Star. At the S4 selection, all the current S4 members come out on top, with Yuzu gaining her third consecutive victory, but as she is graduating she gives the top idol position to Haruka. Lillie announces she will be moving onto the Four Star Academy high school while Yuzu struggles to decide if she should take up the offer for a world tour. In the end Yuzu decides that being with Lillie makes her the most happy and decides to go to the high school with her. Both Yuzu and Lillie call a press conference, were they announce the formation of their new unit Yuzu 'n' Lillie.
99	49	"The Things We Both Forgot"; Transliteration: "Futari no Wasuremono" (Japanese: ふたりの忘れ物)	March 22, 2018
As the new school year begins, Rola prepares to leave Four star Academy for England. Koharu, Ako and Mahiru help Rola pack her belongings up when Yume shows up. As they discuss the future, both Yume an Rola feel they are forgetting something. After discussing it for a while Yume remembers she vowed to surpass Hime and challenges her to a battle on stage. Yume does her Sun Dress, while Hime reveals she gained the Moon Dress while doing Aikatsu abroad. Yume manages to beat Hime, and Rola remember how much Yume inspires her, vowing to continue to Aikatsu until she can surpass Yume.
100	50	"To the Unseen Future"; Transliteration: "Mada minu mirai e" (Japanese: まだ見ぬ未来へ)	March 29, 2018
Yume, Rola, Koharu, Mahiru and Ako decide to spend their final vacation together having fun before Rola leaves for England. The girls spend a night in the country and are joined by Yuzu and Lillie. The next day Yuzu and Lillie reveal a surprise send off for Rola, where all her fans, as well as Yume's, Mahiru's, Koharu's and Ako's, have come to cheer them on as they head for the future. Rola decides to repay everyone with a concert along with Yume and the others before she leaves for England. Before leaving Rola and Yume promise to keep doing Aikatsu so that one day they will join each other on stage again. One year later Yume and Rola prepare to face off on the World Aikatsu Cup stage.
