= Aikatsu Stars! season 1 =

Aikatsu Stars!
- Season 1
- No. of episodes: 50

Release
- Original network: TV Tokyo
- Original release: April 7, 2016 – March 30, 2017

Season chronology
- ← Previous; Aikatsu! season 4 Next → Aikatsu Stars! season 2

Aikatsu Stars! is a Japanese anime television series produced by BN Pictures, and the successor to the original Aikatsu! anime series based on Bandai's Data Carddass arcade machines. The story follows a girl named Yume Nijino who enrolls at Yotsuboshi Gakuen (Four Star Academy) in order to become a top idol and join the popular group S4 which she admires. The series began airing on TV Tokyo from April 7, 2016, succeeding the original Aikatsu! anime series in its initial timeslot. For the first 25 episodes, the opening theme is "Start Line!" (スタートライン!, Sutāto Rain!) by Sena and Rie from AIKATSU☆STARS!, while the ending theme is "episode Solo" by Ruka, Nanase, Kana, and Miho from AIKATSU☆STARS! From episode 26 onwards, the opening theme is "1, 2, Sing For you!" by Sena, Rie, Miki and Kana. From episode 34 until episode 50 the opening theme is "STAR JET!" by Sena, Rie, Kana and Miki. The ending theme from episode 26 until episode 50 is "So Beautiful Story" by Ruka and Sena.

== Episode list ==
| No. | Title | Original release date |
|---|---|---|
| 1 | "The Beginning of a Dream"; Transliteration: "Yume no Hajimari" (Japanese: ゆめのはじまり) | April 7, 2016 |
Yume Nijino and her friend Koharu Nanakura, who want to join the top idol group S4, enroll at the idol school Yotsuboshi Academy, where the four members of S4; Hime Shiratori, Yozora Kasumi, Yuzu Nikaidou, and Tsubasa Kisaragi, study. After her first class, where she meets homeroom teacher Anna Hibiki and a peculiar classmate named Rola Sakuraba, Yume goes with Koharu to the Dress Make Room, where they make their own dress cards. While trying to see off Hime, Yume winds up in the boys' section of the Academy, encountering a boy named Subaru Yuuki. The next day, as the new students are brought in to perform a concert in front of their upperclassmen, Yume manages to give an impressive performance that catches the attention of S4, but suddenly collapses immediately afterwards. Waking up in the infirmary, Yume is greeted by Hime, having seemingly no memory of her performance.
| 2 | "The Two are Rivals!"; Transliteration: "Futari wa Raibaru!" (Japanese: ふたりはライバル！) | April 14, 2016 |
As word spreads about Yume's performance, despite Yume herself being unable to remember what happened or repeat any of the prowess she showed in class, she and Koharu check out the various classes they can audition for. With Koharu deciding to join the Beauty Class after receiving a compliment from Yozora, Yume, along with Rola, decides to join Hime's Song Class. Later, Yume is paired up with Rola for a welcoming party, struggling to get along with her especially due to her lack of skills and experience. Receiving some notes to help with her performance, Yume notices how hard Rola works and aims to work hard herself, and the two soon manage to find common ground. Despite not matching the skills of her first performance, Yume is praised by Rola for how much effort she put into it, with the two deciding to become rivals for a spot in S4.
| 3 | "Towards the Sky of My Color"; Transliteration: "Watashi Iro no Sora e" (Japanese: 私色の空へ) | April 21, 2016 |
With the class sorting auditions approaching, Yume worries that she isn't good enough to join the Song Class. While trying to learn to hold a note, Yume comes across Tsubasa, who reveals that she originally joined the Song Class. Having felt she would be unable to beat Hime to the top of her class, Tsubasa was approached by the teacher of the Theater Class, Momoko Yachigusa, who taught her there's more to just being the top and inspired her to join the Theater Class. After receiving some advice from Subaru, Yume decides to focus on reaching her goal and give her all in the audition. Thanks to the passion she showed in her performance, Yume manages to enter the Song Class alongside while Koharu makes it into the Beauty Class, after which Yume discovers that Subaru is part of the popular boy band M4.
| 4 | "Always 100%!"; Transliteration: "Itsudatte Hyaku Pāsento!" (Japanese: いつだって100%！) | April 28, 2016 |
The first year students in the Song Class are tasked with working backstage at Aikatsu TV, setting up a stage for a fashion show that Hime and Yozora are appearing in. Despite hoping to see more of Hime, Yume finds the job more arguous than she expected. On the morning of the show, Yume comes across Hime, who shows her that much like the strings of a piano, everyone needs to be working at their best to make a show succeed. As the show begins, Yume further learns that everyone is able to do their best because of the extra effort Hime and Yozora put in to draw it out.
| 5 | "My Dress Make!"; Transliteration: "Mai Doresu Meiku!" (Japanese: マイドレスメイク！) | May 5, 2016 |
The students are tasked with using the Dress Make system to design their own dresses. This proves to be tricky for Yume, as she can only choose a single design to go with. As Yume continues to struggle despite doing a lot of research, she is approached by Yuzu, who invites her to her dress fitting. During this time, Yuzu makes adjustments to her dress in order to better suit her dance style, helping Yume to realize that the purpose of a dress is to exhilarate her audience. Thanks to this, Yume manages to create a dress that best suits her and earns a passing grade.
| 6 | "Rock! Rock Girls!"; Transliteration: "Rock! Rokku Gāruzu!" (Japanese: ROCK! ロックガールズ!) | May 12, 2016 |
Yume, Koharu, and Rola decide to enter an audition for a drama starring S4, despite none of them having acted before. To this end, Tsubasa holds an acting class, where the girls meet a Theater Class student named Ako Saotome. As Yume and the others do some research for the role, they receive some pointers from Subaru, prompting a jealous reaction from Ako, who is a big fan of his. These tips help the girls progress through the auditions. Things soon get hectic when Yume is suddenly brought on to play the role of Subaru's girlfriend, prompting more jealousy from Ako.
| 7 | "Simple is the Best!"; Transliteration: "Shinparu izu da Besuto!" (Japanese: シンプル イズ ザ ベスト!) | May 19, 2016 |
Rola enters an audition searching for individualistic idols to be the mascot of an ice-cream company. Hearing that the judges are searching for uniqueness, Rola tries looking up various novel ways in order to stand out, prompting concern from her friends. On the first day of the audition, after meeting a janitor who advises her that "simple is the best", Rola becomes downhearted when the judges feel her attempts at standing out feel forced. As Rola struggles with thinking about how to overcome this, Anna puts her and Yume through a rigorous training regime that seemingly has no point. After spending some time with Yume afterwards, Rola realises that she shouldn't think so hard, and should instead just be herself and do the things she likes. This comes through in her performance and allows her to win the audition, after which she learns the janitor she met is actually the president of the ice-cream company.
| 8 | "A Tiny Glimmer"; Transliteration: "Chiisa-na Kagayaki" (Japanese: 小さな輝き) | May 26, 2016 |
As a fashion model contest is held for the Beauty Class first-years, Koharu befriends her classmate, Mahiru Kasumi. Koharu becomes hesitant to enter the audition, feeling she is lacking compared to everyone else, but Yume and Rola encourage her to have more confidence in herself. Wanting to push her limits, Koharu starts practising balancing a large water bottle across a balance beam. Her practise pays off, as she is able to give a confident walk during the fashion show and even turn an accident into a pose. Although Mahiru wins first place, Koharu is given a special Judge's Choice award for the potential she demonstrated.
| 9 | "Miracle Girls!"; Transliteration: "Mirakuru Gāruzu!" (Japanese: ミラクルガールズ!) | June 2, 2016 |
Yume and Rola are selected to represent Yotsuboshi Academy in an open audition for a confectionery campaign girl, competing against idols from other schools. After clearing the first round, the idols participate in an obstacle race, where Yume helps both Rola and her opponents from Shiny Academy to cross a wooden bridge despite their fear of heights. Yume continues to help Rola through the final obstacle, where the Shiny Academy girls repay the favor. After beating the Shiny Academy girls in a game of rock-paper-scissors, Yume and Rola perform on stage for the tie-breaker, with Rola announced as the winner.
| 10 | "Yume's Start Line!"; Transliteration: "Yume no Sutāto Rain!" (Japanese: ゆめのスタートライン!) | June 9, 2016 |
Yume is requested by the school's headmaster, Hikaru Moroboshi, to hold her first solo concert after Hime's concert gets cancelled. As Yume becomes excited for the concert, using Grade-Up Glitter she previously earned to upgrade her dress, Hime grows concerned about Moroboshi's intentions for forcing such a trial upon Yume. Yume soon discovers that no one has bought any tickets for her performance, and struggles to sell any on her own. As Yume becomes worried about who she should be singing for, Subaru shows her how hard Koharu and Rola are working to sell tickets, encouraging her not to worry about how many people come and instead focus on giving her best performance. In the end, Yume has a modest number of people attend her concert but gives her all nonetheless, matching the skill she showed in her first performance.
| 11 | "Close Contact! A Day in the Life of Hime Shiratori"; Transliteration: "Mitchaku! Shiratori Hime no Ichinichi" (Japanese: 密着!白鳥ひめの一日) | June 16, 2016 |
As an apology for the trouble caused by her concert's cancellation, Hime offers Yume the chance to be her manager for the day, as a television crew documents her schedule. During a commercial shoot, Yume accidentally gets juice on Hime's dress, but Hime manages to fix it and still find time to interact with her fans. After eating lunch at a curry restaurant, where Yume interacts with some fans of her own, Hime starts to feel faint as a result of her sensitivity to the rain. Noticing Hime's determination to perform despite her condition, Yume does what she can by giving her a hand massage. As the day comes to an end, Hime takes a well earned nap while Yume comes to realise how much effort Hime puts into her idol activity.
| 12 | "Soaring Girlfriend♪"; Transliteration: "Habataku Gārufurendo" (Japanese: はばたくガールフレンド♪) | June 23, 2016 |
Following a performance together, Yume and Rola encounter a scary creature on their way back to their dorms, where they face a punishment from Tsubasa for being late. The next day, as Tsubasa becomes strict on a student keeping a pet inside the dorm, more students encounter the mysterious creature, prompting Tsubasa to organise a patrol to disprove the existence of such a thing. They soon discover the creature to be an owl named Hou, who helped Tsubasa cope with her loneliness up until the school forbid her from seeing her again. Seeing that Hou has a family, Tsubasa comes to understand that she isn't as lonely as she thinks.
| 13 | "Little Fairy Story"; Transliteration: "Ritoru Fearī Monogatari" (Japanese: リトルフェアリー物語) | June 30, 2016 |
Yotsuboshi Academy puts on an original movie in which Yume stars as a small fairy. Learning that her sister, played by Hime, has been kidnapped by a demon lord, Yume goes off towards his castle, coming across various allies along the way including M4's Nozomu. Yume soon confronts the demon lord Subaru, who seeks to steal a fairy's wings, working together with Hime and Nozomu to defeat him and restore peace to the land.
| 14 | "Mahiru's Challenge!"; Transliteration: "Mahiru no Kettō!" (Japanese: 真昼の決闘!) | July 7, 2016 |
Yozora announces a contest for students to design their own dress for Romance Kiss and wear it in a special performance. While exploring town for ideas, Yume, Rola, and Koharu come across both Yozora and M4's Asahi, who are both revealed to be Mahiru's siblings. While observing their interactions, Koharu notices that Mahiru always seems to feel downhearted when compared to her sister. Later, Mahiru wins the design contest, having used an alias to both avoid favoritism and to challenge Yozora, who she feels she cannot match up to. On the day of the performance, Yume and the others bring Mahiru a cake to make her smile, something she had been forgetting to do lately, helping her performance shine even more. Afterwards, Mahiru puts up a Tanabata slip, stating her determination to surpass Yozora one day.
| 15 | "Moon and Sun"; Transliteration: "Tsuki to Taiyō" (Japanese: 月と太陽) | July 21, 2016 |
As the top scorers of their respective classes, Rola, Ako, and Mahiru, along with the Dance Class' Luka Haruka, are chosen to pair up with the S4 members and compete in a Summer Fest tournament with lunch coupons up for grabs. Partnered up with Yozora, Mahiru starts to lose her confidence when she sees how good Yozora is. She then explains to Yume and the others how she felt abandoned when Yozora left for Yotsuboshi Academy, which led to her wanting to surpass her. Wanting to surpass Yozora in her performance, Mahiru overworks herself training and ends up collapsing. She becomes further downhearted after Yozora slaps her for acting selfish, wanting to drop out of the Summer Fest. As Koharu helps Mahiru realise that she is actually feeling lonely, Yozora, upon speaking with Hime, shows Mahiru a drawing she had kept from her, revealing she had always been looking forward to spending time together again. Making up with each other, Mahiru and Yozora give a stunning performance at the Summer Fest.
| 16 | "Miracle Baton Touch"; Transliteration: "Mirakuru Baton Tacchi" (Japanese: ミラクルバトンタッチ) | July 28, 2016 |
While out doing a commercial shoot on the morning of the second day of Summer Fest, a camera malfunction puts Rola at risk of not making it back in time for her performance with Hime. Preparing for the worst-case scenario, Anna and Hime prepare Yume, who ranked second, to take Rola's place in the event she can't make it. Further held back by heavy traffic and train delays, Rola is left with no other option to pass the baton onto Yume. Despite only having a short time to rehearse, Yume manages to carry on Rola's spirit and give her all alongside Hime, leading the Song Class to win the Summer Fest.
| 17 | "The Serious Switch!"; Transliteration: "Honki no Suitchi!" (Japanese: 本気のスイッチ！) | August 4, 2016 |
Yume, Koharu, Rola, and Ako appear on M4's variety show. As Ako remains intent on getting Subaru's attention, she is warned by Kanata Hira to keep things under control and treat her fellow idols as equals whilst on air. She gets warned again following a cooking section with Koharu, in which she focused on making Subaru's favorite dish and got upset when he didn't vote for it. After looking at Yume's script and seeing the effort she put into preparing notes, Ako realises how selfish she had been for only focusing on Subaru and takes her singing segment more seriously.
| 18 | "Together with Yuri-chan"; Transliteration: "Yuri-chan to Issho" (Japanese: ゆりちゃんと一緒) | August 11, 2016 |
The girls hear about the Fresh Idol Election, in which the first-year idols will be ranked by fan votes, with the top four idols appearing in the upcoming Aikatsu Island event. While trying to figure out how to increase her popularity, Yume helps out Yuri Ashida, one of the school's admins, as she does various work. As Yume becomes downhearted after learning she is falling behind in the election, Yuri explains how even though she spent the entire week of her elections doing admin work, she was still able to rank well because fans recognised her hard work. Inspired by Yuri's talk, Yume decides to send handwritten letters to all of her fans to show her appreciation, while Yuri and the other admins help her set up a handshaking event and mini-concert. As Yume's efforts place her among the top four alongside Mahiru, Rola, and Ako, Subaru, noticing Yume feeling off following her performance, discovers that Hime has shown similar symptoms following a performance years ago.
| 19 | "Midsummer Top Dancer☆"; Transliteration: "Manatsu no Toppu Dansā" (Japanese: 真夏のトップダンサー☆) | August 18, 2016 |
Hoping to help Koharu with her heat exhaustion, Yuzu invites the girls to a Dance Battle tournament that she is participating in. As the girls meet the Dance admins, Miki Katsura and Saya Akashi, Yuzu sneaks off to greet a close friend who is due to return to school soon. With the finals quickly approaching, the Dance Class is dispatched to retrieve the wondering Yuzu before she is disqualified. During her exploration, Yuzu comes across a lost baby ostrich and returns her to her mother, who helps her get to her performance in time. Yuzu wins the contest but decides to give up the prize of studying abroad in Los Angeles, as she prefers dancing with S4.
| 20 | "Passion and Pride"; Transliteration: "Jōnetsu to Puraido" (Japanese: 情熱とプライド) | August 25, 2016 |
Yume and the others sneak onto the set of a movie that Tsubasa is starring in alongside the rest of S4. During the shoot, Tsubasa gets a lot of slack from the lead actor, Taiyou, who seems to have lost his passion for acting. When a stuntman filling in for Tsubasa is unable to attend the filming, Tsubasa performs the stunt herself, managing to overcome her own hesitation and remind Taiyou of the passion he used to have.
| 21 | "The Desire to Win"; Transliteration: "Kachitai Kimochi" (Japanese: 勝ちたい気持ち) | September 1, 2016 |
As the Song Class are faced with an audition to make their CD debut, putting Yume and Rola is direct competition with each other, they are required to wear weighted clothing during their training. Later that night, Yuri tells Yume and Rola about her experience getting her CD debut. As Yume becomes worried that Rola will outperform her, she speaks with Hime, who tells her to sing using her own ability and be herself rather than try to push her limits. The next day, as both Yume and Rola make it to the final stage of the audition, where they must perform together, Yume becomes saddened when she overhears that the audition has been fixed so that Rola will win. Receiving some encouragement from Koharu, who states there are times where she sings better than Rola, Yume goes through with the audition with Rola, managing to bring out her hidden power and persuade the judge to choose her for the CD debut instead. As Rola is slightly downhearted by the decision, Yume once again feels adverse effects as a result of her performance.
| 22 | "The Road to Her Hero"; Transliteration: "Akogare e Tsuzuku Michi" (Japanese: 憧れへ続く道) | September 8, 2016 |
Due to Moroboshi's meddling, Yume is given only a short amount of time to record a mini-album for her debut CD, with Hime's new album planned for release on the same day. While Yume is excited about the prospects ahead of her, Hime becomes worried about Yume's condition, remembering going through something similar herself. On the day of the recording, Yume struggles to match her previous performance and once again experiences coughing fits. Hearing about her problems, Hime gives Yume a throat remedy and some encouragement, allowing her to get through her recording successfully. Come release day, Yume feels downhearted about not matching Hime's level of success, but Rola, having learned to grow from her defeat, gives her some encouragement.
| 23 | "Descent of the Tundra Diva"; Transliteration: "Tsundora no Otohime Kōrin" (Japanese: ツンドラの音姫降臨) | September 15, 2016 |
Wanting to find her own individuality, Yume and the others go searching for seven "luckies" around the school said to grant wishes. Meanwhile, Yuzu invites her childhood friend, Lily Shirogane, to come see her solo concert, asking her to perform as well. As Yume and the others struggle to find the final lucky, the Tundra Diva, they learn that her identity is Lily herself, who is a second-year student due to return to school. Having found all seven luckies, the girls realise individuality is something they need to find for themselves.
| 24 | "Smile is Rainbow☆"; Transliteration: "Egao wa Nanairo" (Japanese: 笑顔はなないろ☆) | September 22, 2016 |
After giving a group performance, Yume, Rola, Mahiru, and Ako are given a three day break from their activities. Learning that Yume's family runs a well known bakery, the girls all go to Yume's house to try their pastries. While they are there, a girl named Reina comes wanting to bake a cake for her mother's birthday, so Yume and the others decide to help her. Just as the cake is completed, Reina reveals she is worried after having a fight with her mother, but the girls encourage her to tell her how she feels. Afterwards, Yume's father tells her how she helped him realise how his pastries can bring smiles to people.
| 25 | "Broadway☆Dream"; Transliteration: "Burōdowei Dorīmu" (Japanese: ブロードウェ☆イドリーム) | September 29, 2016 |
As students are given roles in a Broadway Dream production for the upcoming school festival, Koharu is selected as a show dancer for one of the musical numbers. Meanwhile, Yume, chosen as Tsubasa's assistant, takes an interest in what goes behind-the-scenes and proposes that they shoot footage of the dressing room to show before the performance. On the day of the performance, the projector that was planned to show Yume's backstage routine breaks down, so Yume instead proposes that they perform their preparation on-stage, leading the show to become a huge success.
| 26 | "A Dream That Can't Be Taken"; Transliteration: "Ubaenai Yume" (Japanese: 奪えない夢) | October 6, 2016 |
Lily returns to Yotsuboshi Academy, though still struggles to participate in activities due to her weak constitution. Meanwhile, Yume ends up spraining her ankle and is forced to sit out from activities for a week. As Yume laments not being able to take part in lessons, Lily tells her about how she deals with her own limitations and trains in her own way, stating her determination to turn her dreams into reality. The next day, Lily holds a revival concert, showing off the results of her own style of training.
| 27 | "The Tale of a Tiny Dress"; Transliteration: "Chiisana no Doresu no Monogatari" (Japanese: 小さなのドレスの物語) | October 13, 2016 |
Yume and Lily go with Hime to her dress brand, My Little Heart, to observe the completion of her new dress. As Lily states she wants to join S4 in order to create her own brand, Hime questions Yume about whether she really wants to join S4 to become just like her. After hearing everyone else's goals for joining S4, Yume becomes worried that her own ambition isn't good enough. Coming to Lily for advice, Yume hears about how a book Yuzu brought her inspired her to become a dressmaker. The next day, Hime unveils her new dress at a fashion show, encouraging Yume to think of something she wants to do besides being like someone else. Meanwhile, Subaru is warned by Moroboshi not to dig any further into the mystery surrounding Yume's sudden bursts of talent.
| 28 | "Halloween★Magic"; Transliteration: "Harowin★Majikku" (Japanese: ハロウィン★マジック) | October 20, 2016 |
On Halloween, the students are tasked with gathering the most candy through trick-or-treating in order to be crowned the Halloween Princess. However, they find that getting candy from each of the rooms isn't so easy, as they face various challenges laid out by the upperclassmen and teachers. Upon facing up against M4, Koharu manages to surprise Asahi with a well-planned prank, earning enough candy to be crowned Halloween Princess.
| 29 | "True Rivals"; Transliteration: "Hontō no Raiburu" (Japanese: 本当のライブル) | October 27, 2016 |
As the girls take part in an audition to perform during a soccer half-time show, Koharu is conflicted about potentially having to relocate to Italy with her family. Determined to win the center position, Rola, not wanting to lose to Yume again, puts in some extra training with Mahiru. On the day of the Song Class' center audition, Rola tries her hardest but once again loses to Yume when she brings out her inner talent again. As Rola feels frustrated by her defeat, Anna encourages her to stop comparing herself to Yume and instead focus on shining with her own individuality.
| 30 | "Rainbow Candy"; Transliteration: "Nanairo no Kyandi" (Japanese: 七色のキャンディ) | November 3, 2016 |
After hearing from Koharu that she is moving overseas in a week's time, Yume works with her friends to throw her a surprise farewell party. While bringing out her all to give Koharu a farewell performance, Yume is suddenly overwhelmed by the side effects of her talent boost and fainted, not waking up until after Koharu has left for Italy. As Yume feels frustrated over not being able to say goodbye properly, Hime reveals that she has gone through the same experience as her during her first year, in which she would receive abnormal skill but at a heavy cost on her body. When this uncertainty left her hesitant to sing, Moroboshi encouraged her to train in order to improve her natural talent so that she wouldn't have to rely on that power again. As Yume is too depressed for the news to sink in properly, she comes across a letter from Koharu thanking her for all the time they've spent together, encouraging her to aim to become stronger.
| 31 | "Take Flight, Sky-Girl!"; Transliteration: "Habatake, Sukai-Gāru!" (Japanese: はばたけ, SKY-GIRL!) | November 10, 2016 |
With students tasked with forming three-girl units for the upcoming Autumn Festival, Tsubasa invites Mahiru to join her unit alongside Yozora, which they decide to name Sky-Girl. Meanwhile, Yume, still downhearted following Koharu's departure, decides to skip on the festival to focus on training. After going through some rigorous training, Mahiru ends up joining the others for a pajama party designed to help bring them together as a unit. On the day of the festival, Mahiru works up until the last moment to create new dresses to unify their unit. As Sky-Girl manage to give a great performance, Yuzu and Ako approach Yume about joining their own unit for the Autumn Festival.
| 32 | "Go Forth, Yuzukoshou!"; Transliteration: "Susume, Yuzukoshō!" (Japanese: 進め, ゆずこしょう!) | November 17, 2016 |
Roped into joining Yuzu and Ako's unit, Yuzukoshou, Yume is unable to get into the swing of things as she is worried about what would happen if she fails again. Noticing a lack of her usual confidence, Yuzu shows Yume messages from all of her fans, showing that there are still people who support her. Regaining her confidence, Yume manages to give a strong performance alongside Yuzukushou, placing second in the festival just behind Lily's unit, The Admins.
| 33 | "Lost Rola!?"; Transliteration: "Maigo no Rōra!?" (Japanese: 迷子のローラ!?) | November 24, 2016 |
Noticing Rola is still in a funk over not being able to beat Yume, Anna and Moroboshi arrange for her to be sent with Lily to the Spa Resort Okunotani. While helping out with maintenance and looking after the elderly visitors, Rola is constantly scolded by an old man for her sloppy work. Meanwhile, as Hime worries that Yume is working too hard, Moroboshi tells her about his older sister and one of S4's earliest members, Hotaru Yukino. While preparing for her performance at the resort, Lily tells Rola about how she sings for herself, stating that you can't move the hearts of others if you can't move yourself. Afterwards, Rola learns that the old man is actually Eikichi Uchida, the ambassador Japan's rock scene and Anna's former teacher, who encourages her to follow Lily's example and find her own path.
| 34 | "Make Up Girl Lesson"; Transliteration: "Oshare Gāru Ressun" (Japanese: おしゃれガールレッスン) | December 1, 2016 |
As Mahiru is offered her own regular feature in a fashion magazine, she comes across two rude ganguro high school girls, Motoko and Eiko, scolding them for littering. The next day, the girls and their leader, Sumiko, come to Mahiru for advice on how best to wear make-up. With her various hair and make-up tips, Mahiru manages to help the girls show off their true beauty without excessive products. As Mahiru becomes inspired to use her magazine feature for make-up lessons, she further trains the three girls to be her models at a fashion show showing off their transformations.
| 35 | "The Selected Stars"; Transliteration: "Erabareshi Hoshi Tachi" (Japanese: 選ばれし星たち) | December 8, 2016 |
Still worried about her power kicking in, Yume asks Hime for a full explanation about what is happening to her. Hime explains how Hotaru was the first to develop this power, the side effects of which led to her losing her voice and suddenly retiring. Having noticed Hotaru's suffering more than anyone else, Moroboshi noticed the symptoms in both Hime and Yume and took it upon himself to stop them ending up the same way. Becoming more afraid upon hearing this, Yume confides about her power to Rola, who encourages her to become a stronger rival. The next day, Moroboshi suddenly tasks Yume with appearing as a surprise guest in Hime's concert, serving as a trial to help her overcome her ordeal with her own strength. Noticing her fear about going up on stage, Hime gives Yume her Premium Rare dress to encourage her. Although Yume makes it through the performance without relying on her power, she remains worried as to whether she'll be able to sing on her own.
| 36 | "Beyond the Rainbow"; Transliteration: "Niji no Mukō e" (Japanese: 虹の向こうへ) | December 15, 2016 |
Moroboshi arranges for Yume to hold a solo concert, threatening to expel her if she cannot satisfy 90% of the audience. As Yume feels her back up against the wall, Hime sends her to a flower shop run by Hotaru. Hotaru explains her experiences with her power and how it led to her losing her voice, regretting that she never appreciated her own natural talent. Reminded of the self-confidence that comes from the support of others, Yume seeks out help from her friends to prepare for her concert and soon returns to her normal self. With everyone's support, Yume manages to perform a successful concert under her own ability, overcoming her need to rely on her power and managing to clear Moroboshi's conditions.
| 37 | "An Exciting Christmas!"; Transliteration: "Dokidoki! Kurisumasu" (Japanese: トキメキ!クリスマス) | December 22, 2016 |
The admins prepare to hold a party for Christmas Eve with a stream of S4's concert, encouraging Yume to put on a performance of her own alongside Rola, Mahiru, and Ako. After checking with M4's plans, the girls manage to set up their concert at the shopping district. After everyone's individual events turn out successfully, Subaru starts to develop feelings for Yume.
| 38 | "Aikatsu New Year!"; Transliteration: "Aikatsu Nyū Iyā!" (Japanese: アイカツニューイヤー！) | January 5, 2017 |
After hosting a New Year's show, the S4 girls look back on how Yume and the others have grown over the past year, contemplating who is likely to be chosen for the upcoming S4 Selection. After visiting the shrine with her friends, Yume is invited to have tea with Hime, who shows her the Tree of Bonds that represent the bonds between S4 members.
| 39 | "Yottsuboshi Academy in Danger!?"; Transliteration: "Yottsuboshi Gakuen, Kiki Ippatsu!?" (Japanese: 四ツ星学園、危機一髪！？) | January 12, 2017 |
Overhearing a conversation between Moroboshi and Anna about the school being in financial crisis, Lily offers to represent Yottsuboshi Academy in a Russian brand designer contest which is offering a sponsorship for the winner. As Lily clears all the challenges ahead of her and reaches the final three, she starts to develop a fever but refuses to retire from the running. Having been concerned for her health, Yume and Rola make their way through snowy weather to deliver some medicine and coffee to Lily, giving her the energy to complete a design for the final round and win the contest. Two weeks later, Lily launches her new brand, Gothic Victoria, with Yume and the others helping to get her shop ready for its opening day. However, she decides to wait to make a Premium Rare Dress until she becomes a member of S4.
| 40 | "Chase After the Princess Diamond!!"; Transliteration: "Purinsesu Daiya o Oe!!" (Japanese: プリンセスダイヤを追え！！) | January 19, 2017 |
The girls star in yet another drama, titled Aikatsu Detectives! The Princess Diamond Incident. As phantom thieves known as the Shadow Stars plot to steal Hime's Princess Diamond, Ako joins Tsubasa, Yuzu, Yozora, and Mahiru as part of an investigation team guarding the diamond at a party. Despite detectives being place everyhere, the diamond gets stolen under everyone's noses, which Tsubasa quickly deduces wasn't the work of the Shadow Stars. As witnesses are questioned, Ako notices that Yuri shouldn't have been able to legibly write a poster after her right hand was injured during the theft, deducing that she is the real thief. Yuri attempts to escape but is thwarted by Ako and Tsubasa, later discovering that the Shadow Stars had manage to steal the diamond from her. Despite this, Ako is praised by Tsubasa for her efforts.
| 41 | "Burn! Star Catching Festival!"; Transliteration: "Moero! Hoshitori Fesu!" (Japanese: 燃えろ! 星取りフェス) | January 26, 2017 |
The school holds the Star Catching Festival, in which each class must use their talents to win different areas by earning votes from the townsfolk. As each of the classes win areas in different ways, the event culminates in a tiebreaker performance between Tsubasa and Yozora. Although the weather gets cloudy halfway through, Yozora manages to use her performance to fill the sky with stars and a dazzling moon to win the festival for the Beauty Class.
| 42 | "The Two Childhood Friends"; Transliteration: "Osananajimi no Futari" (Japanese: 幼馴染の二人) | February 2, 2017 |
Yuzu decides that whoever can keep up with her dancing will be her partner in a music video, but no one in the Dance Class is able to keep up with her. With the class unable to find any other worthy partners, Yume decides to ask Lily to participate. Lily initially declines the offer as she feels she isn't worthy enough to stand alongside Yuzu's brightness, especially due to the fact that Yuzu always surpassed her in physical capabilities in the past. After remembering a promise she made with Yuzu to sing together, however, Lily steps up to join Yuzu in her music video, with their contrasting individualities drawing out each other's best qualities.
| 43 | "A Song Choc-full of Affection"; Transliteration: "Chokotto Uta ni Komeru Omoi" (Japanese: チョコっと歌にこめる想い☆) | February 9, 2017 |
Yume is requested to appear on The Best of Music Show's Valentine's Day Special alongside M4, receiving some pointers from Subaru on how she needs to convey her feelings to the audience. During the show, Yume shows off the obligatory chocolate she received from her friends and expresse her happiness through a song, receiving a unique Grade Up Glitter as a result. Afterwards, Yume gives Subaru some "rival" chocolate, declaring M4 to be her new rivals.
| 44 | "Premonitions of Spring♪"; Transliteration: "Haru no Yokan" (Japanese: 春の予感♪) | February 16, 2017 |
As both Rola and Mahiru become worried about whether they've progressed, Mahiru takes Yozora's advice to perform more and decides to put on a special event with Rola. When they discover that the stages are fully booked, they manage to free up some space by offering to help out with maintenance. On the snowy morning of the performance, Mahiru states how she admires the rival relationship between Rola and Yume. With help from Yume and Ako, Rola and Mahiru shovel the snow off the path and manage to make their event a success, earning their own Grade Up Glitter alongside Yume.
| 45 | "Ako, Headlong!"; Transliteration: "Ako, Masshigura!" (Japanese: あこ、まっしぐら!) | February 23, 2017 |
Wanting to get her own Grade Up Glitter to catch up with the others, Ako searches for a venue for her own performance. With all other options fully booked, Ako manages to book a stage on the roof of a department store. However, she becomes conflicted when Tsubasa invites her to appear on her show at the same time as her performance. Ako becomes tempted to go with Tsubasa in order to better guarantee a Grade Up Glitter, but when she sees how hard some her young fans are supporting her, Ako ultimately decides to keep her promise to perform at the department store for the children. Despite not getting the Grade Up Glitter as a result, Ako is praised for her decision by Yume, Kanata, and Subaru.
| 46 | "Fiery S4 Selection!"; Transliteration: "Honō no S4 Ketteisen!" (Japanese: 炎のS4決定戦!) | March 2, 2017 |
The S4 Selection begins, with Yuzu retaining her spot at the top of the Dance Class. Preparing for the Theater Class selection taking place the next day, Ako becomes determined to outperform Tsubasa and take the top position. Come the day of the selection, Ako wears the outfit she wore at the department store show for her performance. While Ako's performance earns her a spot in S4, she is still outranked by Tsubasa's final performance as an S4 leader, holding back her tears until she is alone.
| 47 | "Kasumi Sisters, Battle!"; Transliteration: "Kasumi Shimai, Taiketsu!" (Japanese: 香澄姉妹、対決!) | March 9, 2017 |
Mahiru prepares to face off against Yozora in the Beauty Class' selection. After both sisters bring out their all in their performances, Mahiru wins the top spot by a small margin. Graciously accepting defeat, Yozora announces that she will be studying fashion abroad in France after her graduation and passes her brand, Romantic Kiss, down to Mahiru.
| 48 | "My Only Song"; Transliteration: "Watashi Dake no Uta" (Japanese: わたしだけの歌) | March 16, 2017 |
The time finally comes for the Song Class selection, with Yume, Rola, Lily, and Hime all competing against each other. With her desire to perform alongside Yuzu, Lily manages to overtake Yuri with her performance, the impact of which hits Rola hard. Receiving encouragement from both Yume and Anna, Rola manages to loosen up and express her individuality through her performance, overtaking Lily in the rankings.
| 49 | "Become the Top Star"; Transliteration: "Ichiban Boshi ni Nare" (Japanese: 一番星になれ) | March 23, 2017 |
Just before her performance, Yume gets a call from Koharu, giving her thanks for everything she has done for her. Encouraged to do her best, Yume brings out her all in her performance, managing to surpass Rola's score. Finally, Hime gives her final and most powerful performance, winning first place in the Song Class. Despite losing to both Yume and Hime, Rola feels refreshed in being able to give her best performance yet. Meanwhile, as Yume feels saddened over her loss, Hime praises her for how much she has grown in the past year, encouraging both her and Rola to face her again some day.
| 50 | "The Greatest Live"; Transliteration: "Saikyō no LIVE" (Japanese: 最強のLIVE) | March 30, 2017 |
With the crowning ceremony, Hime, Tsubasa, and Yozora officially announce Yume, Ako, and Mahiru as their respective successors, joining Yuzu in S4. As the girls begin their preparations for their activities next year, Yume appoints Rola as her Song Class admin while also asking Lily and Yuri to continue their roles as admins. During S4's final Thank-You Party, in which they give their final performance, Yume and her new team of admins help everyone present their own surprise thank-you message with glowsticks.
