= Aikatsu! season 4 =

Aikatsu!
- Season 4
- No. of episodes: 26

Release
- Original network: TV Tokyo
- Original release: October 1, 2015 – March 31, 2016

Season chronology
- ← Previous; Aikatsu! season 3 Next → Aikatsu Stars! season 1

The following is a list of episodes for the fourth and final season of the Aikatsu! anime television series produced by BN Pictures, based on the arcade game series by Bandai Namco Entertainment, which aired on TV Tokyo between October 1, 2015, and March 31, 2016. The season follows the idols Akari Ozora, Sumire Hikami, and Hinaki Shinjo as they take their idol unit, Luminas, on a tour across Japan. The opening theme is "Start Dash Sensation" while the ending theme is "Lucky train!", both performed by Ruka, Mona, and Miki from AIKATSU☆STARS!

== Episodes ==
No.	Season no.	Title	Original release date
153	1	"Let's Fly into a Vast New World!"; Transliteration: "Tobidasou, Hirogaru Sekai!" (Japanese: とびだそう、広がる世界！)	October 1, 2015
Luminas begin their nationwide tour in Hokkaido, where they meet a pair of potato farmers named Nono Daichi and Risa Shirakaba, giving them a behind the scenes look at their upcoming performance. The next day, Akari and the others come across Nono and Risa again, hearing about their love of singing and becoming encouraged to do their best to make people smile in their concert. Becoming awed by everything she's seen, Risa states her determination to become an idol too.
154	2	"Change Your Potato into a Mic"; Transliteration: "Jagaimo o Maiku ni Mochikaete" (Japanese: ジャガイモをマイクにもちかえて)	October 8, 2015
While Luminas continue their tour of Hokkaido, Nono and Risa look into applying for Starlight Academy, working hard in order to get their parents' approval to audition. Arriving at Starlight Academy, the girls are given a tour of the campus by Juri before spending the night at the dorms, where Luminas invite them to their room for some tea. Encouraged by hearing how much they've changed just from making the decision to audition, Nono and Risa use some Dolly Devil brand Aikatsu Cards that they previously deemed too flashy for them for their audition, which they pass with flying colors.
155	3	"Exciting Carat☆"; Transliteration: "Tokimeki Karatto☆" (Japanese: トキメキカラット☆)	October 15, 2015
Nono and Risa begin their lives as Starlight Academy students, meeting all of their fellow idols. Meanwhile, Luminas prepares for an audition for a jewellery commercial, with Yuu lending a hand by showing the jewellery she's made herself. Nono and Risa are also encouraged to take the audition, managing to pass alongside Luminas.
156	4	"YOU! GO! KYOTO!!"	October 22, 2015
Having overslept for a job in Kyoto, Yuu hitches a ride with Akari and the others as they head towards Okinawa, reminiscing about her time as Akari's roommate. Taking the girls on her recommended sights, Yuu explains how her experience with her exchange programs in Kyoto and Kobe led her to become a travel idol. Arriving in Kyoto, Yuu has Akari and the others join her in her Halloween special, along with Kokone and Miyabi. After the program, as Akari goes to sleep, Yuu tells the others that it was because of Akari that she chose to pursue so many exchange programs, having promised with her to both shine bright.
157	5	"Little Devil Happening"; Transliteration: "Koakuma Hapuningu" (Japanese: 小悪魔ハプニング)	October 29, 2015
After getting a job offer to perform a concert for the Urban Girls Collection, Nono and Risa decide they need some Dolly Devil Premium Dresses for their performance. While making their way to Dolly Devil's HQ, Nono becomes separated from Risa and comes across a peculiar woman and accidentally gets her dress stained, helping her to wash it. After the two girls reunite and explain their goals to the woman, they later discover that she is in fact Dolly Devil's top designer, Lucy Kisaragi, who makes some Premium Dresses for them after being inspired by her encounter with them.
158	6	"I Want to Meet You, Okinawa"; Transliteration: "Aitakute, Okinawa" (Japanese: 会いたくて、沖縄)	November 5, 2015
Luminas arrive in Okinawa, where they meet Minami Hateruma, a student of Churaumi Beat Academy who is a strong admirer of Rin's dancing. As the girls hear about how Rin inspired Minami to become an idol, Sumire reveals she and Rin were invited as special guests at a dance festival in Okinawa, but Rin has a schedule conflict with a commercial shoot and might not be able to make it. The next day, Luminas spend the day training with Minami at Churami Beat Academy, while Rin, who is trying to get through her shoot in time, explains to Orihime and Johnny how her encounter with Minami helped her to enjoy dancing. Thanks to her effort, Rin makes it in time to join Minami for the dance festival, allowing them to dance together once more.
159	7	"Galaxy✩Starlight"; Transliteration: "Gyarukushī✩Sutāraito" (Japanese: ギャラクシー✩スターライト)	November 12, 2015
The Starlight Academy girls once again star in a special drama, this one being set in an idol school in space. As the idols of Galaxy Starlight train to bring music all across the galaxy, the evil Jerseyschwarz, led by Johnny, plots to turn all the dresses in the school into jerseys. Believing there is a spy hidden in the academy, Orihime tasks Akari with becoming a top idol and piloting the Oozorakkon mech in order to protect the academy. Meanwhile, Sumire discovers that Rin is the spy swapping people's dresses for jerseys, becoming transformed into a Jerseyschawrz herself. As Rin is confronted by Nao and Madoka, Rin reveals she was originally sent as a spy for Johnny but came to love dresses, deciding to join the side of good and help train Akari to pilot the mech. Joined by her fellow idols, Akari fights through the Jerseyschwarz army, transforming them into cute girls, managing to recover Sumire and defeat Johnny, who becomes a dance teacher at Galaxy Starlight.
160	8	"Dream is Perfect Idol!"; Transliteration: "Yume wa Pāfekuto Aidoru!" (Japanese: 夢はパーフェクトアイドル!)	November 19, 2015
Akari is stalked by a girl named Tsubaki Saionji, who wants to obtain a Premium Dress from Tsubasa but can't get a hold of him. Tsubaki decides to follow Akari during her work in the hope that Tsubasa will show up, but no avail. After being told by Johnny to cool down a little, Tsubaki thinks about her passion for Dream Crown dresses and joins Akari in her training. Following a performance by Akari, Tsubaki finally gets ahold of Tsubasa, deciding to hold off on asking for a Premium Dress until she proves herself as an idol.
161	9	"Osaka Idol Story"; Transliteration: "Ōsaka Aidoru Monogatari" (Japanese: 大阪アイドルものがたり)	November 26, 2015
Luminas bring their tour to Osaka, where they attend a performance by the calculative comedy idol Nina Doujima. Afterwards, Nina meets up with girls, inviting them to Naniwa Grand Academy where she takes an idol course and trains her comedy routines. After watching Luminas' performance, Nina recalls the moment she became aware of her own smile and decided to become a comedy idol, deciding to throw away her usual calculations for her next performance and trust her own instincts.
162	10	"✩Crazy PaniQ✩"; Transliteration: "Metcha Panikku" (Japanese: ✩めちゃパニック✩)	December 3, 2015
Orihime arranges for Luminas to have a collaboration with Nina, spending the day with her on a comedy tour. However, they have trouble getting their jokes across to their audiences of elderly people and teenage girls, who seem to be laughing for all the wrong reasons. Their final stop is at a kindergarten, where a boy named Kentarou proves to be a tough comedy critique who predicts how all their jokes will end. Wanting to make Kentarou laugh, Nina manages to pull off a joke that he wasn't expecting, managing to get a laugh out of him.
163	11	"Happiness Party♪"; Transliteration: "Hapinesu Pāti♪" (Japanese: ハピネスパーティ♪)	December 10, 2015
The girls are all asked to help create designs for a line of "Happiness Toys" by popular toymaker Dandai. After the girls meet with some children representing their target audience, the project designer Nakaya decides to go with a line of Aikatsu Dolls that children can play dress up with. As the girls work to come up with ideas for the commercial, Nakaya works with the top designers to get some prototype dolls made, but struggles to get a hold Asuka to approve designs of Madoka's doll, which they soon discover is due to her dedication to get several Angely Bears ready for Christmas. After managing to get approval on Madoka's doll, Nakaya asks Asuka to allow Angely Bear to be included in the commercial, while Tsubasa makes his own adjustments to Akari's doll.
164	12	"Showstopping New Year!"; Transliteration: "Sakidori Nyū Iyā!" (Japanese: さきどりニューイヤー!)	December 17, 2015
Nono and Risa work through their busy schedule of New Year's programming, which is all recorded in advance, ranging from talk shows to drama appearances. After shooting a variety show with Luminas, they get to meet both Nina and Ichigo, observing their New Year's work too. Later, all the idols participate in a talent show together.
165	13	"Luminas☆Christmas"; Transliteration: "Ruminasu Kurisumasu" (Japanese: ルミナス☆クリスマス)	December 24, 2015
Luminas' final stop on their nationwide tour is set to take place at Starlight Academy on Christmas Eve, with everyone hoping for a White Christmas despite its being statistically unlikely to snow on the day. After running into Ichigo, Nono and Risa make a casual online post that soon spreads across the country, leading to them working with fans to try to deliver truckloads of snow all the way from Hokkaido, receiving additional snow from all the regions they pass by. With Luminas managing to perform on a snowladen stadium as a result, they are joined by Ichigo, Mizuki, and Juri for their final song, after which they are treated with a proper snowfall.
166	14	"The First Wind I Found"; Transliteration: "Watashi ga Mitsuketa Saisho no Kaze" (Japanese: 私が見つけた最初の風)	January 7, 2016
With the new year once again bringing excitement for the upcoming Starlight Queen Cup, Starlight Academy holds a Start Dash event with Sakura, Otome, and Mizuki as special guests. While Akari and the others are excited about competing, Sumire seems hesitant on registering, as she is unsure what kind of Queen she wants to be. However, after discussing with Akari and Hinaki about what drove them to become idols, Sumire soon finds her answer and puts in her registration with the others. Sumire is soon called upon by Maya, who creates a new Premium Dress for her to use in her performance.
167	15	"The Dream Sketchbook"; Transliteration: "Yume no Suketchibukku" (Japanese: 夢のスケッチブック)	January 14, 2016
While making preparations for the Starlight Queen Cup, Akari discovers that Tsubasa has come down with a cold and goes over to help look after him. While Tsubasa rests, thinking about everything that's happened since meeting Akari, Akari comes across a sketchbook showing all the designs he had been drawing for her. After recovering from his cold, Tsubasa prepares to make his best dress yet.
168	16	"One Road, Different Ways"; Transliteration: "Hitotsu no Michi to, Wakare Michi" (Japanese: ひとつの道と、別れ道)	January 21, 2016
As Risa becomes worried about having to compete against Nono during the Starlight Queen Cup, the idols all end up entering a potato competition known as the May Queen Cup. With their experience working with potatoes, Risa and Nono make it to the final round, with Lucy offering a Premium Dress to the winner. Noticing Risa's worries over being apart from Nono, Lucy encourages her to be headstrong in facing new challenges. As such, both Risa and Nono have fun competing against each other in the final round, helping Risa realise that going down a different path isn't necessarily a lonely one, with the contest ending in a draw.
169	17	"Hinaki Miracle!"; Transliteration: "Hinaki Mirakuru!" (Japanese: ひなきミラクル！)	January 28, 2016
While working with Kayoko on a Premium Dress for the Starlight Queen Cup, Hinaki learns that Mikuru, having gained popularity after becoming a top gardener, is holding a concert. The two go to see Mikuru, who joins them in helping them find inspiration for the new dress. They soon go on a training camp at Vivid Kiss' seaside cottage, only to find a French documentary team is scheduled to do a report on Vivid Kiss, so the girls decide to have the training camp be the topic of the documentary. Later that night, as Hinaki worries about how to perform a Fever Appeal, Mikuru shares her experience working with WM, telling her the only important thing is to make sure she has no regrets in whatever she does. Finding some tins of paint, Hinaki decides to go wild and paint the cottage in vivid colors, which inspires Kayoko to create the Street Art coord.
170	18	"An Idol's Strength"; Transliteration: "Aidoru no Chikara" (Japanese: アイドルのチカラ)	February 4, 2016
With a month left until the Starlight Queen Cup, Akari checks up on Tsubasa as he works on her dress. While Tsubasa tries to figure out what his dress needs to be perfect, Akari visits her parents, who remind her of how powerful a smile can be. The next day, Tsubasa delivers his finished dress, the White Sky Veil Coord, stating it was Akari's smile that helped him finish it.
171	19	"Best Friend"; Transliteration: "Besuto Furendo" (Japanese: ベストフレンド)	February 11, 2016
Madoka books a concert house so she can perform with Rin again, since they haven't had much time to practise together. As everyone gets excited for the performance, Rin takes Madoka out to a café to celebrate her birthday.
172	20	"Spring DreaCarnival!"; Transliteration: "Haru no DoriaKānibaru!" (Japanese: 春のドリアカーニバル！)	February 18, 2016
Akari and the others go to Dream Academy to attend its annual DreaCarnival, where they catch up with Seira and the other Dream Academy idols. Along the way, they discover that Noelle has enrolled as a middle-school student, hoping to become an idol like her sister.
173	21	"Double Miracle☆"; Transliteration: "Daburu Mirakuru☆" (Japanese: ダブルミラクル☆)	February 25, 2016
With word spreading about a top secret guest set to headline the Starlight Queen Cup, everyone becomes curious as to who it will be, including Johnny. While visiting Ichigo's bento shop, Johnny comes to the assumption that Masquerade is the special guest in question. His guess turns out to be completely off the mark, however, as the real guests are revealed to be Mizuki and Mikuru, who have reformed WM.
174	22	"My Move on now!" Transliteration: "Watashi no Move on now!" (Japanese: 私の Move on now!)	March 3, 2016
Risa decides she wants to perform Mizuki's signature song, "Move on now!", for the Starlight Queen Cup, as it was the first song she sung on her own. However, she becomes nervous when she learns Mizuki herself will be providing live commentary. While doing a drama shoot with Juri, Risa hears from her about how she gained the confidence to become her own idol. The first day of the Starlight Queen Cup soon gets underway, with Juri managing to obtain an Appeal Ranking of A to place at the top spot. Risa finishes the day's events with her performance, placing just behind Juri, before receiving some personal thanks from Mizuki.
175	23	"The Futures We Want to Come True"; Transliteration: "Kanaetai Mirai-tachi" (Japanese: 叶えたい未来たち)	March 10, 2016
While the other idols prepare for the next day of the Starlight Festival, Nono makes Risa a meal to cheer her up, promising to win in her stead. The next day, as Miyabi and Kokone come to Starlight to watch the event, Nono kicks the day off with her performance, also falling just behind Juri in the rankings. Rin lands in the spot after Nono, while Madoka places between Juri and Nono. With Juri still in the top spot, Akari, Sumire, and Hinaki prepare for the next day's performances.
176	24	"The Queen of Roses"; Transliteration: "Ibara no Joō" (Japanese: いばらの女王)	March 17, 2016
Rin and Madoka decide to respectively help Sumire and Akari train for their performance, while Hinaki speaks with Juri before receiving some flowers from Mikuru. As the final day of the Starlight Queen Cup begins, Hinaki is the first to perform, managing to overtake Juri in the rankings. During her performance, Sumire attempts a Special A-Rank Fever Appeal but fails to land it successfully.
177	25	"Looking Forward to the Future"; Transliteration: "Mirai Muki no Ima" (Japanese: 未来向きの今)	March 24, 2016
Receiving encouragement from Sumire, who still places in the top eight in spite of her failed Fever Appeal, Akari steps up for the final performance. Not only does Akari manage to beat Hinaki and win the title of Starlight Queen, but she also earns the Special A-Rank for her Fever Appeal. During the awards ceremony, Akari is crowned by Ichigo and thanks everyone for helping her get so far. Afterwards, Akari moves into the Starlight Manor, where she finds Sumire and Hinaki waiting to join her in celebration.
178	26	"The Greatest Present"; Transliteration: "Saikō no Puresento" (Japanese: 最高のプレセント)	March 31, 2016
Akari is invited out by Ichigo, who treats her to a special made bento to celebrate her victory. After her meal, Akari makes a request to have Luminas and Soleil hold a joint concert together. Following the performance, the other idols bring out a birthday surprise for Akari, pitting her in an obstacle course race against Ichigo for her present. Managing to catch up to Ichigo at the last second, Akari is treated with a spectacular view and is offered whatever present she'd like, which turns out to be a solo concert with Ichigo.
