= Aikatsu! season 1 =

Aikatsu!
- Season 1
- No. of episodes: 50

Release
- Original network: TV Tokyo
- Original release: October 1, 2012 – September 26, 2013

Season chronology
- Next → Aikatsu! season 2

The following is a list of episodes for the first season to Aikatsu! anime television series, which aired between October 8, 2012, and September 26, 2013. The series, produced by Sunrise in collaboration with Bandai, follows Ichigo Hoshimiya and her friends as they participate in idol activities at Starlight Academy, a school for budding idols. The season uses four pieces of theme music. The opening theme for episode 1-25 is "Signalize!" by Waka, Fūri, Sunao, and Risuko – while the ending theme is "Calendar Girl" (カレンダーガール, Karendā Gāru) by Waka, Fūri and Sunao. For episodes 26-50, the opening theme is "Diamond Happy" (ダイヤモンドハッピー, Daiyamondo Happī) by Waka, Fūri, and Sunao, while the ending is "Hirari/Hitori/Kirari" (ヒラリ／ヒトリ／キラリ) by Waka, Fūri, Sunao, Remi, Moe, Eri, Yuna, and Risuko. The ending theme for episode 44 is "Kiss of the Alice Blue" (アリスブルーのキス, Arisu Burū no Kisu) by Rey. Daisuki began streaming the season in September 2014, and are also streaming the series on YouTube until the end of 2014.

== Episodes ==
No.	Title	Original release date
1	"I Can Become an Idol?"; Transliteration: "Watashi ga Aidoru ni nattemo?" (Japanese: 私がアイドルになっても?)	October 8, 2012
Ichigo Hoshimiya is a bright young girl who is always helping her mother out at a takeaway bento place. After accidentally messing up her brother Raichi's photos of top idol Mizuki Kanzaki, Ichigo goes to her best friend Aoi Kiriya, who manages to get them some tickets to Mizuki's concert. The three of them go to Mizuki's concert, which leaves a strong impression on Ichigo. The next day, Aoi tells Ichigo about the Starlight Academy, a school for idols which uses an 'Aikatsu' system involving cards which are used to select clothes. Aoi decides she wants to try out the entrance exam and asks Ichigo to go with her since she thinks Ichigo has the scent of an idol. As Ichigo reaches the live audition part of her exam, she manages to impress Kanzaki Mizuki and the other judges with her special appeal performance and both she and Aoi pass the exam.
2	"Idols Everywhere!"; Transliteration: "Aidoru ga Ippai!" (Japanese: アイドルがいっぱい！)	October 15, 2012
Ichigo and Aoi begin their first day at Starlight Academy, taking in the sights before moving into their dorm. They then meet up with the headmistress, Orihime Mitsuishi, who gives them the Aikatsu cards they selected in the audition, as well as an Aikatsu Phone used to store their cards. They are soon introduced to their homeroom teacher, Johnny Bepp, and are enrolled in their class. The girls are then informed of a special audition, the winner of which gets to be Mizuki's temporary manager, the catch being that there's only one slot available. As Aoi works hard on her lessons, she explains to Ichigo about how she gained her love of idols. During the audition, Ichigo trips up during the performance while Aoi is declared the winner. As Ichigo laments her loss later that night, she encounters Mizuki, who warns her that she may not always be able to be by Aoi's side.
3	"I Wanted to Know More About You"; Transliteration: "Anata o Motto Shiritakute" (Japanese: あなたをもっと知りたくて)	October 22, 2012
As Aoi begins her job as Mizuki's temporary manager alongside her usual manager, Honoka Tsukikage, Ichigo decides to pursue them in secret. She is soon caught stowing away, but Mizuki lets her tag along regardless. As Mizuki goes through her various activities, Honoka hints to Ichigo that Mizuki isn't the prodigy she thinks she is. Later that night, as Ichigo and Aoi go to return Mizuki's Aikatsu Phone, they notice her pushing herself in late night training. Honoka goes on to explain that Mizuki trains harder than anyone other idol, having spent an entire year before her debut away from the public eye to do intensive training, saying Ichigo and Aoi will need to train even harder if they want to surpass her.
4	"Oh! My! Fan!"	October 29, 2012
After Ichigo and Aoi's audition is uploaded to the academy's website, Aoi gets her first fan letter. As Ichigo applies for another audition with Aoi for a job at a takoyaki store, she begins training to avoid tripping over like last time. She sprains her foot but is helped by a young boy named Oota who reveals himself to be a fan. Ichigo and Aoi join Oota the next day for their running practise and, despite the harshness of the training, both Ichigo and Oota manage to push each other to try their hardest. Having noticed how much Ichigo pushed herself, Oota decides to try harder in his track running as well. As Oota goes to his track meet, Ichigo and Aoi manage to convey their feelings to the audience and win their audition while Oota manages to pass his preliminaries. Later, Aoi tells Ichigo that Oota isn't her very first fan; it's Aoi.
5	"Ran! Runway!"; Transliteration: "Ran! Ranwei!" (Japanese: ラン! ランウェイ!)	November 5, 2012
Ichigo becomes curious about her classmate, Ran Shibuki, who appears to be something of a loner. Later, Ichigo ends up paired with Ran for an upcoming audition for a fashion show. As Ichigo trains with Aoi to act like a model, Ran laments about her former partner. Prior to the audition, Mizuki gives Ichigo some advice on Ran. On the day of the audition, Ran takes Ichigo behind the scenes to show her an idol's purpose on the runway: to express the feelings of the staff, supporters and audience. After passing the audition, Ran reveals to Ichigo about her former roommate, who had to drop out, which had left her in a funk before auditioning with Ichigo.
6	"Absorbed in Signing Autographs!"; Transliteration: "Sain ni Muchū!" (Japanese: サインに夢中!)	November 12, 2012
As Ichigo and Ran head to their fashion shoot, Ichigo realises she doesn't have an autograph signature. Hearing about this, Johnny tasks Ichigo and Aoi to come up with a signature by the next day. Ran agrees to help them figure out an autograph to use, spending all night helping them out. Although Aoi's autograph is approved by Johnny, he feels Ichigo's design would take too long to write. Rather than just design a more simpler one, Ichigo undergoes training to try to write hers more quickly. Later, Ichigo is asked by her family to pay them a visit, which Raichi turns into an autograph session. However, Ichigo finds that her enthusiasm to get her autograph done quickly is alienating her fans. After some advice from Ran, Ichigo learns that it's fine to sacrifice the quality of an autograph for the sake of interacting more with your fans. This meets the approval of Johnny, who rewards Ichigo with some rare Aikatsu cards: Angely Sugar, which helps her win an audition to be a stationary spokeswoman.
7	"The Trouble with Sparkler"; Transliteration: "Tsubuyaki ni Goyōjin" (Japanese: つぶやきにご用心)	November 19, 2012
Ichigo and Aoi end up signing up for different auditions on the same day, receiving support from fans from the KiraKiratter social network. Aoi grows a little concerned when she learns Ran is also entering the same audition she is. Aoi soon ends up picking up strange training advice from KiraKiratter, ranging from beam balancing to aromatherapy, causing Ichigo to become worried. On the day of the Pon-Pon Crepe audition, Aoi receives rare Aikatsu cards: Futuring Girl from the janitor, though he doubts that she can use them properly as she is. As Aoi waits for her audition, she realises that she became so absorbed in net feedback that she's been oblivious to the words of her real life friends. As Aoi starts to doubt that she can beat Ran, Ichigo rushes back from her own audition to give Aoi her support in person. Receiving confidence from Ichigo's support, Aoi manages to win the audition while Ichigo also manages to pass hers.
8	"Underground Sun"; Transliteration: "Chika no Taiyō" (Japanese: 地下の太陽)	November 26, 2012
As Ichigo gets lost while shooting a vlog, she discovers an underground studio where another idol is in training. Later, it is revealed Ran is to participate in a Sensational Student Audition against Hikari Minowa, who she has never been able to beat before. As Ichigo and Aoi discover the underground studio again later that day, they find Hikari is the one using it to rehearse for her web concerts. As the girls visit Ran's room, they learn about how she was given some rare cards from a brand designer she admired. As Ran and Hikari compete together in the final audition, they end up reaching a tie, deciding to settle the score another time. Afterwards, Ran decides to train Ichigo and Aoi for a special group audition.
9	"Move on Now!"	December 3, 2012
As Ichigo, Aoi, and Ran train for their special audition, they ask Johnny for help on obtaining special Premium Cards needed for their audition. When Johnny and Orihime arrange a meeting with the brand designers, the girls train to perform one of Mizuki's songs to impress them. While visiting the library, they meet Michelle Tachibana and Asami Himuro, who are also training for the special audition. Aoi and Ran later have their meetings with their respective brand designers, managing to receive some Premium Cards. Ichigo's meeting with her brand, Angely Sugar, ends up coming close to the special audition, but she decides to take a chance anyway. However, when her Aikatsu Phone runs out of battery, she ends up taking the long route up the side of a mountain. Admiring her effort, the top designer, Amane, rewards her with cards of her latest design, and Ichigo manages to make it back just in time for her audition. The girls manage to put on an amazing performance and pass the audition alongside Michelle and Asami, receiving a light in their Aikatsu Phones known as a Mastery. Later that night, Ichigo runs into Mizuki again, who tells her this is just the beginning.
10	"Rainbow-colored Otome"; Transliteration: "Niji-iro no Otome" (Japanese: 虹色のおとめ)	December 10, 2012
On their way to school, Ichigo and friends meet the peculiar Otome Arisugawa, who fell into the school fountain trying to catch a rainbow. Meanwhile, a tournament is held for one of three places in a special Christmas event, with Ichigo to face Otome in the first round. After Naoto warns Aoi and Ran that Ichigo might not be able to win against Otome if all she thinks about is fun, Ichigo sees how hard Otome practises and becomes determined to practise harder. Later, the janitor gives Ichigo some advice that she needs to sing from her soul, before Ichigo manages to see a rainbow with Otome. Ichigo manages to win the audition to earn her place in the event, along with Aoi and Ran. Afterwards, Orihime and Johnny reveal that due to the increase in participants, an additional position is opened, which Otome is asked to audition for.
11	"Otome is in Love With Someone"; Transliteration: "Otome wa Dareka ni Koi Shiteru" (Japanese: おとめは誰かに恋してる)	December 17, 2012
As Otome falls out of a tree trying to rescue a cat, she is rescued by the janitor. As Otome seems a little spaced out afterwards, Ichigo and the others assume she has a crush on the janitor, leading Aoi to reminisce about a boy she previously admired. Realizing they don't know the janitor's name, Ichigo follows him, learning that he is a band vocalist named Naoto Suzukawa, who claims to have no interest in any of the students and asks Ichigo to keep his other career a secret from the academy. The girls soon learn that what Otome fell in love with wasn't Naoto but the cat-shaped necklace he was wearing at the time. The next day, Otome manages to pass her revenge audition.
12	"We Wish You a Merry Christmas!"	December 24, 2012
As Ichigo ends up volunteering everyone to help out for a Christmas party on the day of the special event, she notices the normally energetic Yuna Nakayama is feeling down due to her parents working around Christmas. As Ichigo becomes determined to prepare a special Christmas Tree for her, she and the others – along with a television producer filming for the special event – visit Angely Mountain to find a suitable tree. Chopping down the biggest tree they could find, the girls ride it down the mountain before Angely Sugar's gardener helps them take it back to the academy, where the other students help to decorate it. Having been pleased with their efforts as they are aired on TV, Orihime awards the girls with some rare Aikatsu cards for their special event. As Yuna beholds the tree her friends prepared for her, she is delighted by the surprise arrival of her parents. As the Christmas party gets underway, Orihime is in talks about pairing Ichigo up with Mizuki.
13	"Tragedy of Calories"; Transliteration: "Karorī no Higeki" (Japanese: カロリーの悲劇)	January 7, 2013
As the New Year rolls in, Orihime informs Mizuki of her planned partnership with Ichigo for a special stage event. Meanwhile, Ichigo ends up eating too much over the New Year's break and gains weight by the time school starts up again. Wanting her to get back into shape, Aoi and Ran enter Ichigo into a Shining Girl audition and try to get her to exercise, but cannot seem to break her out of her lazy and gluttonous habits. They soon show her that she will be unable to use her Aikatsu cards if she does not put her all into being an idol. Remembering how hard Mizuki trains, Ichigo resolves to train harder and starts going on a diet. Despite losing her New Year's weight, Ichigo keeps pushing herself to lose more weight until Mizuki reminds her that it's okay to eat sweet things in moderation. After Ichigo passes her audition, she and the others are informed of a drama audition they will be competing against each other in.
14	"Naughty Detectives"; Transliteration: "Ikenai Deka" (Japanese: イケナイ刑事)	January 14, 2013
As the girls anticipate their audition for a drama called Naughty Detectives, they also find themselves against fellow schoolmate Shion Kamiya. As the girls are informed of two roles to audition for, Shion cuts her hair short to try for a boyish detective role. As Aoi starts to become nervous, Orihime gives her and Ichigo some words of advice. After a series of ad-lib auditions, both Aoi and Shion manage to pass the audition with their performances, although Ichigo also gets cast as an extra.
15	"Camphor Tree Love"; Transliteration: "Kusunoki no Koi" (Japanese: クスノキの恋)	January 21, 2013
As Ichigo and the others prepare for a team audition, they decide that Otome needs to obtain some premium cards. After Johnny warns them that the designer for Otome's favourite brand, Happy Rainbow, is a very strict person, the girls work on their team training. On the day of the audition, Orihime manages to arrange a last-minute meeting with the designer, although Otome ends up getting lost. Just then, she encounters an old woman named Ikuyo who is searching for a camphor tree where she once confessed to her first love. Otome decides to help her search for it, enlisting the help of the others. After searching through countless shrines, the girls find the location of the tree, only to learn it was cut down following a typhoon. Thanking the girls anyway, Ikuyo rewards Otome with a ring that she was given after being turned down. Although the Happy Rainbow designer, Makoto, initially refuses to give Otome her cards due to showing up late, he notices the ring Ikuyo gave her is the same as the one passed down to him by his father, realising he was the one Ikuyo confessed to. Accepting the ring, Makoto awards Otome with the premium cards, and the girls manage to make it to their audition, where they earn the Mastery of Appearance. Afterwards, Mizuki informs Ichigo that they will perform together.
16	"Heart-pounding! Special Live (Part 1)"; Transliteration: "Dokkidoki!! Supesharu Raibu Part 1" (Japanese: ドッキドキ!! スペシャルライブ PART 1)	January 28, 2013
Ichigo nervously attends her first meeting with Mizuki's staff as they plan for her next concert. After the meeting, Mizuki starts training Ichigo on a trampoline, teaching her about the Special Appeals she'll need to use. As Ichigo struggles to think about how to pull it off, her friends give her some advice. During the rehearsal, Ichigo manages to perform a Special Appeal, but later feels frustrated that she couldn't match up to Mizuki, who performed three. However, Mizuki assures her that she'll be able to perform three on the day of the concert.
17	"Heart-pounding! Special Live (Part 2)"; Transliteration: "Dokkidoki!! Supesharu Raibu Part 2" (Japanese: ドッキドキ!! スペシャルライブ Part 2)	February 4, 2013
As the day of the concert arrives, Ichigo's mother, Ringo, has a feeling of nostalgia as she takes Raichi to the theater. Meanwhile, Ichigo is nervous as she has not been able to do three Special Appeals during her rehearsal, but Aoi, Ran, and Otome show up to give her their support. As Ichigo takes the stage for her first performance alongside Mizuki, she can perform three Special Appeals and make a strong impression on the crowd. However, during the second performance, Ichigo starts to feel a bit weak, but Mizuki manages to give her the strength to see it to the end of the song while also performing a fourth Special Appeal herself. Following the concert, Ichigo seems to be spacing out a lot. However, she eventually explodes into high praise for Mizuki while talking to Naoto, wanting to be a top idol just like her.
18	"A Little Chocolate Love"; Transliteration: "Chokotto Rabu" (Japanese: チョコっとらぶ)	February 11, 2013
As Ichigo, Aoi, Ran, and Otome are asked to perform for a Valentine's Day Fashion Show, they decide to make some handmade chocolate for the event before spending the night choosing their clothes. Meanwhile, Raichi, who wants to receive some chocolate from Aoi, sneaks into Starlight Academy dressed as a girl, posing as Ichigo's little sister so he can help make the chocolate. However, he becomes depressed when he finds Aoi hasn't made any chocolate for him. He does cheer up after watching everyone in the fashion show. After the performance, Aoi gives Raichi some chocolate of his own.
19	"The Secret Scent of the Moonlit Girl"; Transliteration: "Tsukiyo no Anoko wa Himitsu no Kaori" (Japanese: 月夜のあの娘は秘密の香り)	February 18, 2013
While running home late from a job, Ichigo encounters a supposed vampire, who runs off when she sees a pin Otome gave her. This vampire is revealed to be Otome's classmate, Yurika Tōdō, who constantly acts in character in preparation for a Loli-Goth-themed audition for a rock festival, which Ichigo also intends to participate in. Feeling she needs to make a character for herself too, Ichigo starts dressing up like Frankenstein's bride. The next day, Yurika ends up causing a fire in her dorm room while using aroma candles to fit her character, with Ichigo rushing in to recover her umbrella before Naoto puts out the fire. After the incident, Yurika gives Ichigo and the others her thanks and shows them her normal side, as a regular girl wearing glasses who likes vampires. As the day of the audition comes, Ichigo decides to face Yurika using her brand. Despite not winning the audition, she feels proud of her efforts.
20	"Vampire Scandal"; Transliteration: "Banpaia Sukyandaru" (Japanese: ヴァンパイアスキャンダル)	February 25, 2013
An article appears in the tabloids features photos that expose Yurika's normal appearance, which she keeps secret from the public. Ichigo and the others suggest that she might be able to overcome it if she obtains some Premium Cards for the rock festival. However, Yurika becomes downhearted, believing she will lose the fans who loved her vampire personality. Wanting to cheer her up, Ichigo shows Yurika some of her fans who were hiding outside of her dorm, who still believe in her. Regaining her confidence, Yurika and the others go to meet the Loli Gothic's head designer, Maya Yumekouji, who lives in a rather spooky mansion. After the others help her get through the scary trials, Yurika reaches Maya, who acknowledges Yurika's desire to become stronger and gives her some Premium Cards. After pulling out a stellar performance at the rock festival, Yurika returns to her good old self.
21	"Stylish Phantom Thief Swallowtail"; Transliteration: "Oshare Kaitō Suwarōteiru" (Japanese: オシャレ怪盗☆スワロウテイル)	March 4, 2013
Ichigo, Ran, Otome, and Yurika are given the chance to audition for a remake of Stylish Thief Swallowtail, a film which previously starred Masquerade, the female duo Orihime was a part of. As the girls train for the audition, Yurika chooses not to stick with her vampire character. Upon arriving at the audition, the girls are tasked with recovering a card that was stolen from a holographic Mizuki from a booby trap filled castle, where Ichigo and Otome's hasty movements cause trouble for Ran and Yurika. Although Yurika manages to help the gang get past a group of guards, her lack of training makes itself noticeable when she has to dodge security lasers. As the girls soon reach the escape phase of their audition, they end up having to fight their way past Aoi and Shion onto a hot air balloon. When the balloon suddenly starts to descend, Ichigo and Otome decide to get off to lighten the balloon, shortly joined by Ran and Yurika, who decide to join them. As the audition comes to a close, they each receive a Mark of Acting in their Aikatsu Phones, including Aoi, while Ichigo and Otome are chosen for the roles in the movie.
22	"Idol Aura and Calendar Girl"; Transliteration: "Aidoru Ōra to Karendā Gāru" (Japanese: アイドルオーラとカレンダーガール)	March 11, 2013
The girls decide to go undercover so they can watch Ichigo and Otome's film in a theater. Afterwards, they come across Ringo and Raichi, who point out how idols have a particular scent to them, which Aoi later explains to be an idol's aura. As Ichigo becomes worried that she might not have an idol aura herself, she, Aoi, and Ran are informed of a concert they will appear due to the attention the three girls have garnered from their recent work. Later, Ichigo appears in a radio interview and is initially overcome with nerves, but gets some assurance from the host. During the show, Ichigo reads out a letter by Raichi, the answer of which projects her aura out of the radio to her fans. Ichigo soon comes to realise that aura is not something she can exude, but flaws naturally from her idol activities. After the concert goes without a hitch, Orihime makes plans for Ran to participate in a special audition held by Spicy Ageha.
23	"Swallowtail's Muse"; Transliteration: "Ageha na Myūzu" (Japanese: アゲハなミューズ)	March 18, 2013
As Ran trains for the representative audition for Spicy Ageha, Ichigo asks her to participate in a fashion show for the senior students' graduation ceremony. Ran states that she must beat third-year student Ema Shinjō to become a representative. The former ends up losing the audition to Ema, with Orihime saying that although her audition was spot-on, she does not yet have what it takes to become the brand's 'muse'. Ran starts pushing herself to train, believing she is inappropriate for the fashion show audition. Noticing her funk, Orihime takes Ran to the third-year classmates to teach her the true meaning of being a muse, to inspire designers to design for her. Receiving some new Aikatsu cards for everyone, Ran joins the others in the fashion show before seeing off Ema as she graduates.
24	"Enjoy Off-time"; Transliteration: "Enjoi Ofu-taimu" (Japanese: エンジョイ♪オフタイム)	March 25, 2013
Upon finishing their audition for a while, Ichigo, Aoi, and Ran decide to go to some hot springs for their time off. Along the way, they encounter some fans, have conversations on the train, and stop by a field of flowers to enjoy a picnic. However, after taking a lengthy nap after eating, the trio finds they have missed all of the buses to the hot springs, meaning they have to walk back to the station. Luckily, the trio encounters another fan who gives them a ride to the station, and despite not getting to go to the hot springs, the girls enjoy the day they have spent together. On the ride home, Ichigo announces that her father is returning home.
25	"An April Fool Promise"; Transliteration: "Eipuriru Fūru no Yakusoku" (Japanese: エイプリルフールのやくそく☆)	April 4, 2013
Ichigo's father, Taichi, arrives home on April Fools' Day, bringing with him some star grapes that he acquired during his travels. Hearing Taichi wil be around for the Spring Vacation, Ichigo invites him to view one of her auditions before taking him to the academy to meet her friends, where he talks more wild tales, which Aoi and the others pass off as an April Fool's prank. Later that night, Taichi receives a call from his colleagues, calling him back to work to negotiate with a tribe about the star grapes. Working as quickly as he can, Taichi manages to make it back to Japan in time for Ichigo's audition, as the tribe elder urged him to head back and keep his daughter's promise. After the audition, Ichigo sees Tacihi off as he heads back on his travels.
26	"The Cherry Blossom Season"; Transliteration: "Sakura no Kisetsu" (Japanese: さくらの季節)	April 11, 2013
As Ichigo and the other students move up one year in a new school year, the second-year ones are assigned to help mentor the new freshmen. Ichigo is assigned to a freshman named Sakura Kitaoji, whose grandfather helped train Mizuki. However, her twin brother, Sakon, does not appreciate her enrolling in Starlight Academy and living on her own. After an awkward argument between siblings, Ichigo begins training Sakura for a freshman fashion show audition. When Ichigo feels that Sakura is worrying about something, she gets advice from Mizuki and comes to realize that Sakura is anxious due to being apart from her brother. Ichigo gets help from Naoto to light up a cherry blossom tree outside of Sakura's dorm, assuring her that she is never alone. After the audition, Sakon expresses his praise for how well Sakura handled things on her own.
27	"Raise the Curtain: Fresh Girls' Cup"; Transliteration: "Kaimaku: Furesshu Gāruzu Kappu" (Japanese: 開幕☆フレッシュガールズカップ)	April 18, 2013
The Fresh Girls Cup is announced, in which students get the chance to challenge Mizuki for the title of Starlight Queen. Ran, who competed the previous year before Ichigo and Aoi transferred in, explains how remarkable Mizuki is for facing off against every single student, stating it will be tough to beat her and all of their rivals. This year, Mizuki throws in a new rule that performers will have to perform three special appeals on demand or otherwise fail, pushing the bar exceptionally high. Ichigo and the others soon start training intensely for the cup, though Ichigo feels there is something they are missing. After receiving a call from Raichi, she comes to understand the most important thing: have fun and appeal to their fans. On the day of the cup, Ichigo, Aoi, Ran, Otome, Yurika, and Sakura are grouped together to face Mizuki, though only Ichigo, Aoi, and Ran eventually keep up with the special appeals until the end and qualify for the semifinals.
28	"Mizuki and Turtle"; Transliteration: "Mizuki to Suppon" (Japanese: 美月とスッポン)	April 25, 2013
Ichigo, Aoi, and Ran find themselves unable to sleep before the semi-finals and decide to have a sleepover in Ichigo's room. Reading Mizuki's new magazine for research, they learn she has started her brand, Love Queen, designed specifically for top idols. As the girls take the magazine's advice of undergoing individual training catered to their needs, Naoto helps Ichigo realise the best way for her to train: act instead of think. Ichigo makes it to the final stages, but Aoi and Ran continue to support her despite their losses. Before the final begins, Mizuki tells Ichigo that she is using the Cup to search for a worthy partner, urging Ichigo to give it everything she's got, although she ends up in second place in the end. Later that night, Mizuki hints to Ichigo that the gap between them may be smaller than she thinks.
29	"Idol Teacher"; Transliteration: "Aidoru Tīchā" (Japanese: アイドル☆ティーチャー)	May 2, 2013
As Ichigo, Aoi, and Ran ponder how they can catch up to Mizuki, they meet a first-year student named Akane Mimori who admires Aoi. With the girls wondering how to become more responsible upperclassmen, Orihime assigns them as teachers, in which they must come up with ways to teach the freshmen about being an idol. Struggling to come up with lesson ideas, the girls approach Akane over what she would like to learn, to which she expresses that she would like to hear about what they have experienced. On the day of the lesson, Ran has trouble getting questions from the audience while Ichigo forgets about teaching them altogether. However, Aoi stays focused and provides an insightful look into idol life, gaining a lot of praise from the students. As a reward, the girls receive rare Spring Collection cards from Orihime and put them to use in a show.
30	"Cordial Call & Response"; Transliteration: "Magokoro no Kōru & Resuponsu" (Japanese: 真心のコール＆レスポンス)	May 9, 2013
A special audition where idols must form teams to try to earn the Mastery of Communication occurs. Ichigo and the others invite Sakura to join their team, but she neither feels confident nor have any premium rare cards. Sakura tells them about her favorite brand, Aurora Fantasy, but doubts that she would be able to obtain premium cards from its top designer, Green Grass. As the other idols try to help Sakura, Otome goes to see Makoto, who is friends with Green Grass, and receives a new Happy Rainbow Premium Dress, conveying to Sakura how she does not want to lose interest in Aurora Fantasy. With her confidence renewed, Sakura meets Green Grass, who is revealed to be a pair of twin sisters and give her a Premium Dress as gratitude for all the letters she sent to them as a child. After a successful audition using call & response, the girls earn their Mastery of Communication.
31	"An Idol on Mother's Day"; Transliteration: "Haha no Hi wa Aidoru" (Japanese: 母の日はアイドル)	May 16, 2013
As Mother's Day approaches, an audition is announced in which student pairs will be performing one of Masquerade's songs. With the theme being 'nostalgic melody', Aoi puts everyone on a 'retro' training regime, but this fails to impress the dance teacher. On Mother's Day, Ichigo and Raichi help around the house so Ringo can put her feet up. While observing her cooking, Ichigo gets some advice from Ringo on how to overcome her training wall. Ringo takes Ichigo to an old stage where they used to sing as children, as well as where she first met Taichi. After helping Ichigo practise her dance routine, Ringo gives her an Aikatsu accessory card, the Starlight Tiara, which she wears in her audition with Aoi, helping them to win.
32	"Ichigo Panic"; Transliteration: "Ichigo Panikku" (Japanese: いちごパニック)	May 23, 2013
The idols are chosen for a Newcomer Idol event, in which they decide on wearing matching brands. Ichigo is requested by Angely Sugar's designer to appear in a commercial for their mascot, Angely Bear. However, its schedule conflicts with the training for the newcomer event, but Ichigo becomes determined to do both, as she feels they are both crucial. While handling production meetings during the day, Ichigo trains for her performance during the night. Noticing her struggling to balance them properly, Aoi gets help from Johnny and Sakura to provide dance lesson videos for Ichigo to use as a reference. As Ichigo feels bad about falling behind on her concert practice, the designer tells her why she made the Angely Bears: bring smiles to people. Upon finishing up her filming, Ichigo gets in some extra training with the other idols and performs well before they watch the finished commercial.
33	"Chance & Try"; Transliteration: "Chansu & Torai" (Japanese: チャンス&トライ☆)	May 30, 2013
Mizuki decides to host an audition at Starlight Academy for two partners to form a new girl group named Tristar with her. As all the students spend the next week training, the girls hear from Aoi about how Mizuki once tried a team audition shortly after becoming the Starlight Queen, but failed due to her skill being far beyond her teammates. The audition begins with an obstacle course, with the idols first required to climb a steep wall, which is made more difficult due to Naoto spraying water everywhere, eliminating the contestants down to fifty. They next have to cross a balance beam while being bombarded with volleyballs, followed by having to finish a song while riding a mechanical bull, reducing the contestants to twenty. After Yurika gets eliminated due to keeping her character during a crawl against a giant fan, eight idols remain for the concert stage, which, besides Ichigo and the others, include the three girls who entered the team audition with Mizuki two years ago. After the eight contestants perform, Mizuki announces that Ichigo, Aoi, Ran, and the three former teammates will compete in a final audition the next day. Just then, a mysterious girl named Kaede Ichinose skydives in from above.
34	"Hello☆Super Idol"; Transliteration: "Hello☆Sūpā Aidoru" (Japanese: Hello☆スーパーアイドル)	June 6, 2013
Kaede, a super idol in the United States, manages to get a place in the final audition by showing she has done more extreme versions of the trials the other idols went through. This leaves Aoi and Ran uneasy about their auditions, while Ichigo wonders if there is something more to the audition than simply getting into Tristar. The girls decide to visit Kaede, where they learn how she became fascinated with magic after meeting the designer of her favorite brand, Magical Toy. Kaede then explains to Ichigo that even though the audition is for a place in Tristar. it is still a performance that she intends to make fun of for the audience. This encourages the others to do their best in entertaining their fans during their audition the next day. Following the audition, Mizuki chooses Kaede as her first member, but announces that Ichigo, Aoi, and Ran must face off against each other in one more audition for the remaining place.
35	"Star of Tears"; Transliteration: "Namida no Hoshi" (Japanese: 涙の星)	June 13, 2013
With the final audition approaching, Ichigo, Aoi, and Ran are told to spend the night living in separate rooms of a big mansion without their Aikatsu Phones. Upon receiving special Summer Collection cards of their respective brands from Orihime, each girl is individually interviewed by Mizuki, each giving their insight on why they would fit in Tristar. After the final audition takes place, Mizuki chooses Ran to be the final member of Tristar, feeling that she has what it takes to stand on her own, as well as perform as a team. Ichigo and Aoi tearfully see Ran off as she heads for a new life as a member of Tristar.
36	"Tristar Take-off"; Transliteration: "Toraisutā Teiku-ofu☆" (Japanese: トライスターテイクオフ☆)	June 20, 2013
With Tristar's schedule becoming busier, Ran becomes more isolated from Ichigo and Aoi, who are saddened to hear Ran is unable to return to the Star Academy dorms. Wanting to deliver a gift to her, the girls try to arrange a meeting when Tristar's schedule conflicts with Ichigo's audition and Aoi's filming in the same building. Ran becomes so anxious about being able to meet them that she makes some errors during her performance. She ends up barely missing Ichigo and Aoi, who leave her a gift and a motivational message. However, Ran still feels disappointed that she is not living up to the expectations of Mizuki and Kaede. Meanwhile, Orihime has plans to start up another idol unit.
37	"Head For the Sun"; Transliteration: "Taiyō ni Mukatte" (Japanese: 太陽に向かって)	June 27, 2013
As Tristar continues their success, Orihime announces that Ichigo and Aoi will form a new idol unit, which they decide to name Soleil. After making a mistake during a performance, a lonely Ran misses Ichigo and Aoi during a rehearsal, she comes to realize that she is severely missing them. This does not go unnoticed by Mizuki, who realizes she has been stifling Ran's potential for her own goals. Upon receiving an e-mail from Mizuki, Ran rushes to Soleil's debut concert, where she announces she has left Tristar to shine bright alongside Ichigo and Aoi as a member of Soleil.
38	"Strawberry Parfait"; Transliteration: "Sutoroberī Pafe" (Japanese: ストロベリーパフェ♪)	July 4, 2013
With Soleil now a trio, Aoi and Ran decide Ichigo should be the leader. Meanwhile, Otome decides to form a girl group with Sakura and Shion, Powa Powa Puririn, while Mizuki is interested in Yurika. While initially struggling with what leader she should try to become, Ichigo gets some inspiration from a strawberry parfait, being a leader who relies on her teammates as much as they rely on her. Mizuki eventually reveals that she has chosen Yurika as the third member of TriStar, followed by an announcement that TriStar and Soleil will perform together in concert. Later that night, Ran meets up with Yurika to pass on her former uniform. The next day, after Soleil's performance, Johnny praised Ichigo as the leader despite having thought that she would cause chaos. Once both of them have done their performances, Orihime mentioned how many units will be formed one after another soon, including Powapowa Puririn.
39	"Shine On, Soleil!"; Transliteration: "Soreyuke, Soreiyu!" (Japanese: それゆけ, ソレイユ!)	July 11, 2013
Orihime asks Soleil to perform a concert at a local open-air stage in Ichigo's hometown. However, the idols must fill every seat without using television or the internet, or the event will be canceled. The girls jog throughout town, spreading awareness of their concert to the citizens, including adults who may not have heard of Soleil. Upon stopping by Ringo's restaurant, the girls help deliver some groceries to an old lady, who helps spread word of the concert to her elderly friends, who in turn provide more opportunities to promote themselves, building up to a large following. Although there is one seat left, Ichigo pleads with Johnny to let the concert go ahead so they will not cause their fans to get disappointed. As the girls perform, the concert manages to pull even more fans than they needed, proving to be a complete success. Afterwards, Orihime reveals that Soleil and Tristar will perform together in a summer tour as a combined group known as Star Anis.
40	"Girl Meets Girl"	July 18, 2013
Soleil has to announce Star Anis' tour without Tristar due to a flight delay, but Aoi manages to handle things until a live feed goes up. Orihime also makes a surprise announcement that Powa Powa Puririn will join Star Anis as well. As Soleil realizes they need to practice for a special audition for the Mastery of Dance, Aoi hears about a new Futuring Girl Premium Dress and arranges a meeting with the top designer. While waiting to hear back from Orihime about the meeting, Aoi tells Ran about how she first befriended Ichigo after meeting her at a festival. Aoi then hears from Orihime that they may have to cancel the Futuring Girl dress announcement as the top designer, Rei, has locked himself in a shell, so Aoi is sent to try to get him out. Aoi decides to tell him more about her first meeting with Ichigo and how she set her on the path to becoming an idol, expressing how much Futuring Girl means to her. Moved by this, Rei comes out of his shell and gives Aoi the Premium Dress. The audition goes well with Ichigo, Aoi, and Ran earning the Mastery of Dance each.
41	"Summer-colored Miracle"; Transliteration: "Natsuiro Mirakuru" (Japanese: 夏色ミラクル☆)	July 25, 2013
As Powa Powa Puririn gives a press conference about their involvement with Star Anis, Shion states she will not join Star Anis to focus on her acting career. When the girls begin their tour, Aoi is put in charge of Star Anis' publicity. After their first rehearsal as a combined unit, the girls grow concerned that an approaching typhoon may cause problems for their performance, though some tension is relieved as Mizuki joins them for the night. Although the weather clears up by the morning and the tour goes on ahead, the typhoon ends up damaging one of the electric pylons, causing a blackout in the stadium that leaves the Aikatsu system unusable. Wanting to cheer their fans up, the girls do various stage performances to buy time for the staff to get a backup generator online, allowing the performance to go ahead.
42	"Shipboard Finale☆"; Transliteration: "Senjō no Fināre☆" (Japanese: 船上のフィナーレ☆)	August 1, 2013
Once Star Anis ended their tour, Orihime announced there would be a secret live concert on a cruise with a hundred fans. Later that night, Ichigo, who grows curious about Mizuki's words that they should act as individuals, comes to Kaede. The next day, the girls participate in various activities with their fans, including a dance session with Johnny and a dinner where fans can talk with their favourite idol, helping Ichigo see how letting fans meet idols individually helps improve the love for the entire group. The cruise ship returns home after the final performance and all girl groups return to their usual activities.
43	"Idol in Wonderland!"; Transliteration: "Fushigi no Kuni no Aidoru!" (Japanese: 不思議の国のアイドル!)	August 8, 2013
As Star Anis returns to their sub-units, Shion is preparing for an audition for the role of Alice in a production of Alice in Wonderland. However, having mostly played cool, stoic roles, Shion worries that she will not be able to give off a dazzling smile for it. On the day of her audition, Shion is surprised to find Ichigo had been cast as the White Rabbit at the request of Orihime, with Aoi, Ran, and the other idols being cast in various roles. Despite the pressure of needing to keep in character regardless of the surprises, Shion finds herself having a lot of fun. Reaching the final scene, a cheerful Shion states her dream of becoming an actress, giving off a dazzling smile that wins the director over before earning her the part.
44	"More Than True Crisis!"	August 15, 2013
Nao's bandmate King of More Than True appears near the Starlight Academy entrance, telling Ichigo to pass on a message that he "will never approve of Nao's music". After the message is passed on, Nao simply states it is between them and reminds Ichigo not to tell anyone he's in a band. After stuffing her cheeks to keep herself from blabbing to Aoi and Ran, Ichigo follows Nao to a music studio, where she finds her arguing with his bandmates, Hiro and Shurato, over King leaving the band. Ichigo learns from Nao that after More Than True became popular, King became frustrated with Nao only writing songs that would sell and decided to quit the band. As Nao laments his laziness, King overhears their conversation and apologizes, but stands by his feeling that their songs should be for their fans. With the direction of the band still in question, Ichigo suggests they attend one of Soleil's concerts to show them there is no such thing as 'a fan he cannot see'. Inspired by this, More Than True resumes its activities.
45	"Happy Summer Vacation"; Transliteration: "Hapi Sama Bakēshon" (Japanese: ハピサマ☆バケーション)	August 22, 2013
Orihime decides to give the members of Star Anis a day-off at a water park. As the idols assemble, Mizuki gets delayed due to some sudden radio work. Wanting to cheer them up, Aoi suggests they have a water sports contest, which soon draws a crowd. Having been called by Ichigo several times, Honoka decides to get Mizuki to the water park as quickly as possible so she can share another memory with them. Noticing the loud crowd they have gathered, the gang decide to secretly put on a song for them. After the park closes, Honoka convinces the staff to let the girls stay longer so they can play with Mizuki.
46	"Respect J" (Japanese: リスペクトJ)	August 29, 2013
Orihime announces that the Starlight Queen Cup is approaching, with Star Anies qualified to compete. Facing Mizuki off, Ichigo, Aoi, and Ran become curious about what Mizuki did during her one-year absence from the spotlight. Orihime suggests they speak with Mizuki's coach during that period, who turns out to be none other than Johnny much to their surprise. Johnny agrees to give the girls the same special lessons he gave Mizuki, saying they need to learn how to express emotions with their performance. Later that night, Mizuki invites the girls over and tells them about how she was inspired to become an idol after watching footage of Masquerade's first concert, revealing Johnny was also behind their choreography. After talks, Mizuki allows Johnny to teach her and spends the next year training to become an idol. Thanks to Johnny's lessons, the idols show happiness with their performance.
47	"Legendary Idols, Masquerade"; Transliteration: "Rejendo Aidoru, Masukarēdo" (Japanese: レジェンドアイドル・マスカレード)	September 5, 2013
As Mizuki worries over her busy schedule, Orihime gives Ichigo and the others a key to a Masquerade reference room featuring various materials on the group. They learn that Orihime had used a mask identity and was secretly an idol as she did not want to continue her father's business, but cannot find much information on the group's other member, Miya. On the first day of the Starlight Queen Cup, Mizuki collapses right before she starts an opening concert. Having seen this coming before, Orihime and Miya host a special Masquerade reunion performance for the opening act. Gaining strength from watching their performance, Mizuki manages to recover enough to perform the rest of the concert. After the performance, Ichigo is called to meet Miya, revealing to her that she is Ringo.
48	"Wake Up My Music♪"	September 12, 2013
After Ichigo, Aoi, and Ran learns about Ringo's secret, she goes home with her to rest up for the Starlight Queen Cup, where Raichi also learns of Ringo's identity. Ringo tells about how she met Orihime when they first became idols, eventually deciding to start a unit together. Ringo had kept her identity a secret from Ichigo as she wanted her to make her own decision about becoming an idol. The next day, Ichigo goes along with Ringo to meet Asuka, who helped Ringo transfer from being an idol to fulfilling her childhood dream of running a bento shop, and receives a new premium dress from her. After Masquerade gives its final performance, Ringo thanks Mizuki for helping Ichigo reach her dream.
49	"The Place Where Brilliance is Heading"; Transliteration: "Kagayaki ga Mukau Basho" (Japanese: 輝きが向かう場所)	September 19, 2013
Aoi learns that she has won the lead role in a movie while Ran hears of another audition to be Spicy Ageha's representative. With everyone having goals for after the Starlight Queen Cup, Ichigo tries to think of what path she should take, eventually deciding to talk with Kaede about what she decided. On the day of the tournament, the seven idols compete against each other, with Ichigo being chosen as the one to face Mizuki off for the title of Starlight Queen. As Aoi orders a parfait to celebrate, she is shocked to learn from Kaede that Ichigo is planning to leave Starlight Academy.
50	"Memories Await in the Future"; Transliteration: "Omoide wa Mirai no Naka ni" (Japanese: 思い出は未来の中に)	September 26, 2013
After everyone gets together, Ichigo reveals her intention to leave Starlight Academy and go to America after the cup in search of burning idol activities. The next day, she faces off against Mizuki in the Starlight Queen Cup finale, which is won by the latter. Despite her loss, Ichigo is happy thanks to the support of her fans, which grants her and the others the Mastery of Friendship. Before she leaves for the airport, Mizuki allows her to perform once more alongside Aoi and Ran. As Ichigo prepares for her flight, Mizuki has also decided to leave Starlight Academy to pursue her path.
