= Aikatsu! season 2 =

Aikatsu!
- Season 2
- No. of episodes: 51

Release
- Original network: TV Tokyo
- Original release: October 3, 2013 – September 25, 2014

Season chronology
- ← Previous; Aikatsu! season 1 Next → Aikatsu! season 3

The following is a list of episodes for the second season of Aikatsu! anime television series produced by Sunrise, which aired on TV Tokyo between October 3, 2013, and September 25, 2014. After Ichigo takes a year-long break to train in America, she returns to compete against the idols of Dream Academy. For episodes 51 until 75, the opening theme is "Kira Power" by Waka, Fūri, and Sunao – while the ending theme is "Original Star" (オリジナルスター☆彡, Orijinaru Sutā) by Waka, Fūri, Sunao, Remi, Moe, Eri, Yuna, and Risuko. From episodes 76 until 101, the opening theme is "Shining Line" by Waka, Fūri, and Yuna – while the ending theme is "Precious" by Risuko, Waka, Fūri, and Mona.

== Episodes ==
No.	Season No.	Title	Original release date
51	1	"That Rock Girl is a Dream Girl"; Transliteration: "Rokku na Ano Ko wa Dorīmu☆Gāru" (Japanese: ロックなあの娘はドリーム☆ガール)	October 3, 2013
One year after Ichigo left for America, a new rival idol school known as Dream Academy, has been formed, raising its own idols. Meanwhile, at Starlight Academy, where Otome is the current Starlight Queen, Aoi and the others meet a peculiar girl whom they cannot identify amongst the listed idols. The next day, Orihime announces a new evolution to the Aikatsu card system, Constellation, before introducing Dream Academy's headmaster, Tiara Yumesaki, and announcing a competitive concert between the two schools, with Aoi chosen as Starlight Academy's representative. Later that day, Aoi and Ran overhear Orihime discussing with Johnny that if Aoi loses, she will quit being headmaster. The next day, the girl from before introduces herself to Aoi and Ran as Seira Otoshiro, a new idol and Dream Academy's representative, along with her producer, Kii Saegusa. Seira soon makes her idol debut and pulls off a new type of Special Appeal, Constellation Appeal, that stuns the crowd. As Aoi becomes anxious about her performance, Ichigo makes a surprise return.
52	2	"Welcome Home, Strawberry"; Transliteration: "Okaeri, Sutoroberī" (Japanese: おかえり♪ストロベリー)	October 10, 2013
After Ichigo reunites with her friends, Seira decides to test if she can pull off a Constellation Appeal, with Aoi letting her take her place in the concert. Ichigo manages to pull off a Constellation Appeal, which results in the contest ending in a draw. Orihime, pleased that Ichigo is returning to Starlight Academy, gives her a new Aikatsu Phone and a Constellation mark. Afterwards, the girls hold a welcome home party for Ichigo, who talks about her experiences in America. The next day, Ichigo, Aoi, and Ran decide to 'infiltrate' Dream Academy to do some research on Seira as she goes about her day, unaware that Mizuki is watching them.
53	3	"Lalala Rival"; Transliteration: "Rarara Raibaru" (Japanese: ラララ☆★ライバル)	October 17, 2013
After failing to find some concrete details on what Ichigo got up to during her year in America, Kii sends Seira over to Ichigo's house to ask her in person. Ichigo and Raichi visit a café, where they meet Noel Otoshiro, a fan of Ichigo who also turns out to be Raichi's classmate and Seira's younger sister. As Ichigo learns more about Seira from Noel, Seira comes to understand Ichigo a bit more from eating Ringo's lunches. Later, Ichigo and Seira are asked to perform together for a Swing Rock event, this time with Seira managing to win over Ichigo. Despite her victory, Seira feels she wasn't shining as brightly as Ichigo.
54	4	"Secret of Smiles"; Transliteration: "Egao no Himitsu" (Japanese: 笑顔のヒミツ)	October 24, 2013
As the idols have some new promotional photos taken, Ichigo, Aoi, Ran, and Seira are asked to help promote a new camera model by letting fans take pictures of them. After running into each other while practising their candid expressions, Ichigo, Aoi, Ran, Seira, and Kii go shopping together to explore the range of expressions they can make, before stopping by Seira's café. There, they discuss how their best smiles naturally come from doing the things they love. After Ichigo and co finish up their performance at the photo session, Seira ponders how it would be nice to stand beside friends on stage.
55	5	"The Password is OK-OK-Okay"; Transliteration: "Aikotoba wa Oke Oke Okkē" (Japanese: 合い言葉はオケオケオッケー☆)	October 31, 2013
With an audition for the next Pon Pon Crepe image girl to replace Aoi coming up, Seira suggests Kii give it a go, but she states it would not suit her because she is a producer. While remaining curious over why Kii became a producer in the first place, Seira hears from her about how her mother helped cheer her up with her hair accessories. After seeking advice about the audition from Aoi, Seira secretly enters Kii into the audition and has her act as her producer. As Kii becomes reluctant to do the audition, Seira gives her an Aikatsu card of the accessory her mother made for her, encouraging her to show off her cuteness. Kii manages to pass the audition and become Pon Pon Crepe's new image girl, starting her off on the path of an idol.
56	6	"Top Secret of Love"; Transliteration: "Koi no Toppu Shīkuretto" (Japanese: 恋のトップシークレット)	November 7, 2013
The presence of a reporter known as Mister S, who is infamous for exposing idol love affairs, puts the other idols on high alert. Meanwhile, Aoi and Kii are asked to participate in a fashion show themed around 'first love'. Feeling that Mister S may be targeting Seira, Kii has her take asylum in Starlight Academy, as she feels her secret hobby of cutely talking to cats clashes with her rock idol image. As a result, the idols must conduct a plan to publicly announce Seira's love of cats themselves before Mister S can make a scandal out of it. While contemplating what Mister S' true objective is, Orihime tells Ichigo and the others her thoughts on idols and love before Aoi and Kii hit the stage for their fashion show. Meanwhile, Mister S reveals his objective to find the secrets behind Dream Academy's sudden success.
57	7	"Mascot Cha-Ran-Way"; Transliteration: "Yuru Kya-Ran-Wei!" (Japanese: ゆるキャ蘭ウェイ！)	November 14, 2013
As the subject of mascot phone charms is brought up, Ichigo notices Ran seems to have her mascot charm. Meanwhile, Ran is given a Constellation Premium Dress by Spicy Ageha's top designer and is tasked with performing a Constellation Appeal at her next fashion show. While checking on Ran's room, the next day, Ichigo and Aoi discover Ran is incredibly fond of a mascot character called Ebipon, choosing to keep it secret so that it won't affect Ran's image. However, they soon learn of a delivery of a giant Ebipon plush Ran had won in a contest, and rush to try and keep it from getting delivered while she is being interviewed by a magazine, to no avail. Ran explains that she came to like Ebipon as a way to relieve the stress of her career. Despite her love of Ebipon being revealed to the public, Ran remains confident and manages to perform a Constellation Appeal and is offered a job to be Ebipon's PR model.
58	8	"Magical Dancing"; Transliteration: "Majikaru Danshingu" (Japanese: マジカルダンシング)	November 21, 2013
Seira and Kii will perform together, with Kii suggesting they do their choreography. Wanting to learn about choreography, the two seek out Johnny, who decides to give them, along with Ichigo and co, a lesson on how to compose choreography. After giving points about listening to the lyrics and imagining poses that fit alongside them, Johnny gives them a cryptic point to think on themselves. When Seira and Kii feel something is off with their choreography, Ichigo and co offer them some pointers to help their poses feel more natural, telling them to have fun and help each other out. Afterwards, their computer suggests they do some work at an airport to improve their dynamic movements. Before heading on stage, they come to understand Johnny's final point: think about their fans who support them and pull off their flawless choreography.
59	9	"Wrap It Up! Choco-Pop Detective"; Transliteration: "Chokotto Kaiketsu! Choko-Poppu Tantei" (Japanese: ちょこっと解決☆チョコポップ探偵)	November 28, 2013
Aoi is approached about creating a TV drama to promote some new chocolate. Upon deciding to make the drama about a chocolate-eating detective, Aoi asks Ichigo and the others to audition alongside her, with Seira and Kii also brought in to audition. However, they find the scenario the producers have put together is more old-fashioned than what they had in mind. Meeting together with the producers, Aoi and the others manage to come up with a cuter, more chocolatey feel to the show. After pairing up into pairs of detectives and assistants, the girls undergo the audition, in which they must help Kaede locate some stolen chocolate. As the plot reaches its climax, Ichigo and Seira deduce that Kaede was tricking them into stealing the chocolate, which just winds up being eaten by Ichigo. At the end of the day, Seira and Kii are chosen for the roles.
60	10	"The Fabled Powa-Puri"; Transliteration: "Uwasa no Powa-Puri" (Japanese: ウワサのぽわプリ☆)	December 5, 2013
After Otome, Sakura, and Shion visit Seira's café, Ichigo, Seira, and Kii tail them to get a glimpse of Powa Powa Puririn's activities, which happen to include line-balancing, leaf sweeping, and games of tag. They are shown to be filmed in secret for their television show to capture their appeal. When a change in her filming schedule leaves Shion unable to appear in a fashion show with the others, Otome and Sakura try and search for a replacement to fill in for her. After learning that they had not been able to find a substitute for her, Shion manages to arrange for Kaede to fill in for her at the last minute, with both the fashion show and Shion's filming turning out to be a success.
61	11	"Sparkle Drip Magic"; Transliteration: "Kira Pata Majikku" (Japanese: キラ・パタ・マジック☆)	December 12, 2013
Sora Kazesawa, a Dream Academy student studying in both idol and designer courses, is approached by Tiara to start her own Aikatsu brand. However, Sora feels a bit nervous about the responsibility of running a brand, as she's always been free in the way she's designed her clothes. Wanting to help her out, Seira and Kii visit her dorm, where they meet her pet parrot, Palm, and hear about what inspired her to become a designer. While staying in Morocco when she was young, Sora met a Bohemian named Mimi, who taught her how to design accessories. Wanting to carry on what Mimi taught her, Sora decides to name her brand Bohemian Sky, showing off her new design in a performance, where she also manages to pull off a Constellation Appeal.
62	12	"The Idol is Santa Claus!"; Transliteration: "Aidoru wa Santa Kurōsu!" (Japanese: アイドルはサンタクロース！)	December 19, 2013
Dream Academy decides to host a Christmas party with Kii as producer and Sora as the designer, while Ichigo features on a Christmas cake designed by Asuka. Kii eventually arranges for the party to be a joint celebration between Dream Academy and Starlight Academy. On Christmas Eve, students from both schools assemble at a lodge on a snowy mountain to prepare for the party, with Sora planning to make a huge Christmas cake. However, a sudden blizzard causes the cable cars to the lodge to stop working, preventing the patissiers from arriving on time, so the idols band together to make the cake instead. With the life-size Ichigo doll they were planning to use, still with the patissiers, Ichigo herself takes her place on top of the cake.
63	13	"Red and White Aikatsu Battle!"; Transliteration: "Kōhaku Aikatsu Gassen!" (Japanese: 紅白アイカツ合戦!)	December 26, 2013
As idols from both Starlight Academy and Dream Academy gather to participate in the Red and White Aikatsu Battle, Mister S is spotted, hoping to find the person responsible for Dream Academy's rise to fame somewhere among them. After interviews, Ichigo, Aoi, and Ran go to greet the event's special guest, enka singer Sabuko Nishijima, helping to carry her giant 'Enkatsu card' that she had brought to the event. Sabuko then informs Ichigo and the others that Mizuki is somewhere in the building, prompting the girls to search for her, eventually finding her in the auditorium. Mizuki reveals she has been working at Dream Academy as Tiara's advisor, stating that her time with Star Anis had her interested in potentially becoming a producer. She then gives Ichigo some Trend Collection cards for her stage performance with Seira, asking her to keep their meeting a secret. Having overheard their conversation, Mister S prepares to write a big scandal on Mizuki's 'defection', but is stopped by Sabuko, who uses her influence to keep him quiet. The Red and White Aikatsu Battle soon gets underway, which culminates with Sabuko's performance and Ichigo and Seira's concert, with both Red and White teams ending in a tie.
64	14	"Lucky Idol"; Transliteration: "Rakkī Aidoru" (Japanese: ラッキーアイドル☆)	January 9, 2014
At the start of the new year, Starlight Academy and Dream Academy are poised to compete in a Lucky Idol Race, with a custom-made Constellation Dress up for grabs for the winner. All the idols prepare for the race while Raichi is busy preparing his Aikatsu Newspaper. The race soon begins, with many Aikatsu!-related obstacles along the way. Thanks to some encouraging words from her father, Ichigo places first and wins a custom-made Angely Sugar dress, with Seira and Aoi coming second and third respectively.
65	15	"Door Towards the Dream"; Transliteration: "Yume e no Tobira" (Japanese: 夢への扉)	January 16, 2014
Ichigo and friends are informed of a Starlight Idol Festival occurring in March, with her as the headlining act. However, on the day of its announcement, Orihime also revealed that Dream Academy is holding its own Dream Academy Carnival on the same dates. Feeling that it is too much of a coincidence, Ichigo, Aoi, and Ran follow Nao, the only other person who heard about the festival in advance, and learn that he is Tiara's younger brother. After Nao tells the others how it was Tiara's dream to start an idol school, Orihime and Tiara decide to combine their two schools' festivals into one single event, the Star-Dream Festival-Carnival, which will culminate in a face-off event between Ichigo and Seira. While watching the announcement, Seira recalls how she became interested in the world of idols after watching Ichigo's performance on TV and seeing how happy it made others. She auditioned to enroll in Starlight Academy, but was rejected as the judges felt she was more suited to rock music, which eventually led her to enroll in Dream Academy, whose policy was that anyone who had passion could become an idol.
66	16	"Beautiful Mutual Feelings"; Transliteration: "Suteki na Ryō-omoi" (Japanese: ステキな両思い)	January 23, 2014
After producing a successful make-up commercial for Seira, Kii is lined up to audition for the poster girl of her favorite beverage, Brain Thunder. Wanting Kii to audition, Seira tries to take her to search for Magical Toy's top designer while he is in town, but finds it hard to drag her away from producing her next commercial. As Kii struggles to focus on her own audition after Seira bans her from thinking about the commercial, she is approached by Mizuki, who assures her that Seira is doing her best to encourage her. The next day, Kii tries to search for Magical Toy's top designer, with Ichigo and the others deciding to help her out. When Kii gets a cramp while chasing after the designer's van, Seira manages to catch up to it and pull him over, with Kii managing to persuade him to give her a Constellation Premium Dress, which she uses to pass her audition. Meanwhile, Mizuki takes her leave from Dream Academy to pursue her dream of supporting others.
67	17	"Fortune Compass"; Transliteration: "Fōchun Konpasu" (Japanese: フォーチュンコンパス☆)	January 30, 2014
Ran enters an audition in which she has to make an ehomaki for Setsubun, seeking advice from Ichigo and Aoi. During a festival where the Starlight Academy idols give their fans homemade treats, however, Ran comes to realise that her healthy approach to cooking isn't going to impress anyone. Determined to make a more delicious ehomaki for her audition, Ran's concentration leads her to getting lost in a forest, alongside Sora, who is also entering the audition. While waiting to be rescued by Ichigo and Aoi, Sora makes Ran an ehomaki made from ingredients found in the forest, telling her to make an ehomaki that she feels is right. On the day of the audition, Ran follows her grandmother's advice and makes her healthy ehomaki that manages to impress the judges, taking her to the final dance audition against Sora. Their perfect performance earns them to pass in an audition for ehomaki image girls.
68	18	"Flower-Blooming Aurora Princess"; Transliteration: "Hanasaku Ōrora Purinsesu" (Japanese: 花咲くオーロラプリンセス)	February 6, 2014
Dream Academy idol Maria Himesato, who is due to appear on an 'Idol Princesses' television program where she will receive a Constellation Dress from Green Grass, decides she wants daisies incorporated into the design to remind her of the mountains. Seira and Kii take her to Ichigo's bento shop to pick up a daisy, where she also tries one of their seaweed bentos. As Sakura and Sora go to pass on Maria's message to Green Grass, Maria takes Ichigo and the others to her home in the mountains for the show's recording. Sora eventually rejoins them, delivering the Constellation Dress and a video message from Green Grass.
69	19	"Hosting Heart"; Transliteration: "Omotenashi Hāto" (Japanese: おもてなしハート)	February 13, 2014
Given the chance to appear in a special episode of Idol Princesses, Maria decides to invite her friends from both Dream Academy and Starlight Academy to a house party at her mansion. The girls find themselves amazed and moved by the Aurora Fantasy-like world and Maria's hospitable heart. Maria explains that, even though she felt lonely whenever her parents were off travelling around the world, she found comfort in Green Grass' books and found happiness in every life. After Maria gives some Valentine's Day chocolates to everyone, the girls decide to sing some songs together before giving Maria a special holographic aurora.
70	20	"Stylish Explorers: Cool Angels!"; Transliteration: "Oshare Tanken-tai: Kūru Enjerusu!" (Japanese: おしゃれ探検隊 クールエンジェルス！)	February 20, 2014
Seira, Kii, Sora, and Maria are invited to audition for a four-girl drama series. Unable to decide on which roles to audition for, they let Kii's computer choose for them, with Kii ending up as the leader character. The girls ask Ichigo, Aoi, and Ran for advice on drama auditions, learning how to utilise their skills to fit their assigned roles and make them their own. The audition soon begins, in which they must navigate a jungle course while following a script. As the girls struggle fitting into their roles, they come up against a group of tigers, but they manage to handle them in their way. The girls eventually reach a ruin filled with traps, where they have been assigned to fight some villains standing in their way. With teamwork, the girls manage to get past them and reach the treasure, passing the audition.
71	21	"The Glittering Aquarius"; Transliteration: "Kirameki wa Akueriasu" (Japanese: キラめきはアクエリアス)	February 27, 2014
Aoi is requested to appear in a concert promoting a Futuring Girl Constellation Dress, in which she is expected to perform a Constellation Appeal. As Aoi wonders how she can pull off a Constellation Appeal, Tiara tells her that she is much like water, but does not get an opportunity to explain why, leaving Aoi with more questions than answers. Noticing her unease, the other idols each do their part to give Aoi some encouragement. On the other hand, Aoi needs to learn to stand on her own and goes training in the mountains, which proves to be harder than she thought, as she does not have enough water to prepare her provisions. During the night, Ichigo comes over to see Aoi, telling her that the reason she could keep going during her year in America was the letter she gave her before she left, which she has kept unopened. Hearing Ichigo's words of encouragement, Aoi comes to realise the meaning of Tiara's words; that water is like an unsung hero, not standing out on its own, but necessary in supporting others. While believing in her abilities, Aoi eventually pulls off a Constellation Appeal at the concert.
72	22	"Happy☆Idol Fest 1st Day!"; Transliteration: "Happi☆Idoru Fesu 1st Day!" (Japanese: ハッピィ☆アイドルフェス 1st Day!)	March 6, 2014
The day before the Star Dream Festival & Carnival begins, Dream Academy is busy with preparations for the Dream Carnival day. Seira, who has been nervous about being the headlining act, learns from Ichigo that she plans to perform alongside her friends. As the carnival begins, Tiara gives Orihime a tour of the academy whilst Ichigo and the others take in the attractions. As Ichigo spends some time with Seira, she states that even though they are considered rivals competing against each other, they are also friends connected by Aikatsu. Encouraged by Ichigo's words, Seira asks Kii, Sora, and Maria to perform on stage alongside her. With the Dream Carnival ending on a high note, it is discovered that the schedule Otome had prepared for the next day's Starlight Festival doesn't actually include herself in the performance lineup.
73	23	"Happy☆Idol Fest 2nd Day!"; Transliteration: "Happy☆Idoru Fesu 2nd Day!" (Japanese: ハッピィ☆アイドルフェス 2nd Day!)	March 13, 2014
Otome explains that she was so focused on including everyone in her schedule that she forgot to include herself, refusing to make any further changes to the timetable. As the Starlight Festival gets underway, the idols from Dream Academy learn of the situation and meet up with the Star Academy girls, who mention how Otome has been working hard for the festival due to her role as Starlight Queen, as well as to provide a wonderful memory for those about to graduate from the middle school division. Ichigo, Aoi, and Ran eventually found Otome, who had been rushing around the campus all day, conveying their desire for her to be on stage and convincing her to perform alongside them. At the end of the festival, as Starlight Academy is declared the winner of the Festival & Carnival, both schools' idols decide to team up to form a new group called Dream Star.
74	24	"Cherry Blossom-colored Memories"; Transliteration: "Sakura-iro Memorīzu" (Japanese: 桜色メモリーズ)	March 20, 2014
With graduation approaching for the third-year students, Ichigo, Aoi, and Ran are put in charge of the graduation album committee, collecting a large amount of pictures and reminiscing about the memories they possess, particularly from the year Ichigo was away. As the day of the graduation ceremony comes, Sakura represents the second-year students in delivering their message to the graduates, barely keeping her tears in, after which Sakura and Otome put on a concert together. Afterwards, Ichigo and the others reassure Sakura they won't be too far away from her, since they will attend high school.
75	25	"Again Off-time"; Transliteration: "Agein Ofu-taimu" (Japanese: アゲイン♪オフタイム)	March 27, 2014
With spring break returning, Ichigo, Aoi, and Ran once again attempt to go to the hot springs they missed last time, stopping by the rape blossom field again along the way when they discover a bus stop has been built next to it. Meanwhile, Otome, Sakura, and Shion watch the flowers together, Sora and Maria end up meeting with Kaede, and Seira and Kii run into Yurika at a rock concert, with each group learning about a "Secret Live" event featuring a mysterious idol. Ichigo and co soon arrive at the hot spring inn, where they bathe with monkeys, play various games, and take in the sights. On their way home, the secret idol is revealed to be Mizuki returning to the entertainment industry.
76	26	"Shocking Fresh Girl!"; Transliteration: "Bikkuri Furesshu Gāru!" (Japanese: びっくり☆フレッシュガール!)	April 3, 2014
Upon beginning their lives as high school students, Ichigo, Aoi, and Ran are requested by Orihime to act as judges for an Audition Caravan scouting the country for potential new Starlight Academy idols. One girl looking forward to the audition is Akari Ozora, a die-hard Ichigo fan who had previously failed to get into Starlight Academy. As the auditions reach their final day in Starlight Academy, Akari gets nervous and messes up her introduction, but Ichigo becomes amazed by Akari's words of how she inspired her. Despite making a lot of mistakes in her dance audition, Akari gets a passing mark from Ichigo, selecting her to enroll in Starlight Academy.
77	27	"Let's Aim To Be Stars"; Transliteration: "Mezashiteru Sutā" (Japanese: 目指してるスター☆彡)	April 10, 2014
Akari begins her first day at Starlight Academy, meeting up with Orihime and receiving her cards, ID, and Aikatsu Phone before moving into the dorms with her new roommate, Yuu. There, Akari learns of a TV programme where Ichigo discusses why she chose her, though Ichigo's words, that she saw an idol in her, leave Akari with more questions than answers. Meanwhile, Kii hints to Ichigo that her decision to enrol Akari may have come from her desire to produce her. Later, as Ichigo is offered a PR gig, she decides to have Akari join her on stage and begins training her to use a Special Appeal. As Akari worries that she won't be able to become a star like Ichigo, Ichigo assures her that she is already a star, showing the same light as a true idol. After the performance, during which Akari manages to perform a normal appeal, Akari, realizing she no longer has to try to be like Ichigo, cuts her hair and starts to form her own story.
78	28	"The Miracle Begins!"; Transliteration: "Mirakuru Hajimaru!" (Japanese: ミラクルはじまる！)	April 17, 2014
Akari shows up with a shorter haircut, which the others help to straighten up. Later, Ichigo ends up encountering Mizuki, who reveals she is forming her group from a new agency she founded herself, before leaving some cryptic words concerning waffles. The next day, both Starlight and Dream Academy announce the revival of the Partner's Cup, a tournament for idol pairs. Curious about Mizuki's new partner, Ichigo remembers the clues Mizuki gave her and searches for the whereabouts of Mizuki's agency with help from the others. They eventually find a warehouse named 'Moonlight Office', where they observe Mizuki practicing with her new partner, Mikuru Natsuki. After Mikuru takes her leave, Ichigo and the others find she is a shopkeeper at a gardening shop as opposed to an idol, with Mizuki explaining that Mikuru has a lot to offer because of that. She demonstrates this in a surprise live performance of their duo called WM, after which they announce they will be participating in the Partner's Cup.
79	29	"Yes! Best Partner" (Japanese: Yes！ベストパートナー)	April 24, 2014
With the appearance of WM proving a threat to both Starlight and Dream Academy, Ichigo and the others turn their focus onto choosing an ideal partner, with Starlight students allowed to pair up with Dream Academy students. The girls who had yet to find a partner gather up together and try some test runs with different partner variations to see what works for them. As everyone is given the night to decide who they think their best partner would be, both Aoi and Kii suggest to Ichigo and Seira that they would be ideal partners for each other. The next day, some of the agreed pairs included Ichigo and Seira, Aoi and Kii, and Otome and Maria. However, Yurika gets upset when her ideal partner, Ran, is paired up with Sora, and refuses to pair up with Kaede when asked. This is largely because she feels they would be living in the shadow of Tristar, which Yurika chose to disband after Mizuki left Starlight Academy. Looking to disprove this, Kaede drags Yurika across town, where they are chased around by their fans, before taking her on a helicopter ride. After Kaede convinces her that together they can overcome any naysayers, Yurika agrees to become her partner, and the two parachute down to announce their partnership.
80	30	"Aikatsu! Boot Camp"; Transliteration: "Aikatsu! Būto Kyanpu" (Japanese: アイカツ！ブートキャンプ)	May 1, 2014
Noticing Akari's poor grades, Orihime signs her up for Aikatsu Boot Camp, which has a reputation for having harsh training. Akari and the other trainees arrive at the boot camp on a remote island, where they are tasked with building a stage to perform on. Although Akari finds herself struggling behind, she soon makes friends with the other trainees, who have similar troubles to her, and helps them with planning a stage. When it comes to building the stage itself, Ichigo, Aoi, and Ran show up to give Akari and the others some pointers and support. With the stage built, Akari decides to perform alongside Ichigo as its christening performance. Thanks to the camp, Akari comes off as a better idol thanks to learning about friendship.
81	31	"Vi-Vi-Vi Partner"; Transliteration: "Bi-Bi-Bi Pātonā" (Japanese: ビビビッ☆パートナー)	May 8, 2014
With the Partner's Cup approaching, Ichigo, Aoi, and Ran head to Dream Academy to practise with their partners. Wanting to learn more about WM, Ichigo and Seira visit Mizuki and Mikuru, who explain how they came to meet each other. Back when Mizuki was still attending Starlight Academy, Mikuru, who came to deliver some flowers, gave her advice on picking out a coord for a performance. Encouraged by Mikuru's words, which helped her change herself, Mizuki decided to become Mikuru's partner. As the first day of the Partner's Cup arrives, WM put up an amazing performance, encouraging Ichigo and Seira to do their best to outshine them.
82	32	"Aim For the Greatest Partners"; Transliteration: "Mezase Saikō no Pātonā" (Japanese: めざせ☆最高のパートナー)	May 15, 2014
After being informed by Raichi and Noelle, Aoi and Kii go to visit Ichigo and Seira, who are nervous about going up against WM following their performance, with both of them expressing how they don't want to hold the other back. As each of the pairs give their performance, Ichigo and Seira observe how the partners complement each other perfectly in unique ways. Before their performance comes up, Ichigo and Seira are told that their feelings of not wanting to hold each other back already makes them the perfect partners. Encouraged by everyone's words, they decide to do things their own way and bring out their best during their performance. Despite falling short of WM's score, they both feel proud that they had fun with their performance, becoming encouraged to one day surpass WM and keep doing their best until they pair up once more.
83	33	"Otome Rainbow!" (Japanese: おとめ Rainbow！)	May 22, 2014
Having become close friends with Otome during the Partner's Cup, Maria becomes keen to learn more about her, wondering how she became who she is. Meanwhile, Otome hears from Makoto that he is designing a Constellation Premium Dress for Happy Rainbow, but is struggling with ideas. Afterwards, Maria comes across Otome at a kindergarten, which is revealed to be Otome's home, and helps her with preparations for a play of The Wizard of Oz. This brings back memories for Otome about a girl named Nagisa who had terrible stage fright. When Nagisa got scared of playing Dorothy, feeling she couldn't be like Otome, Otome confessed to her that she had a fear of heights and had never gone down a slide, and together, they worked to try and overcome their fears. On the day before the play, as Nagisa's stage fright pressured her yet again, Otome pushed herself to reach the top of the slide and came to enjoy it, giving Nagisa the encouragement she needed to perform. As Maria feels happy to learn so much about Otome, Makoto becomes inspired by Otome's playful smile and completes the Constellation Premium Dress. After her performance, Otome is pleasantly surprised to find Makoto had brought Nagisa to see her performance.
84	34	"Blooming Miracle!"; Transliteration: "Saite Mirakuru！" (Japanese: 咲いてミラクル！)	May 29, 2014
As Mizuki and WM reach the top of Aikatsu! Ranking charts, Mikuru is tasked by Mizuki to reach the top ten rankings of the individual charts, suggesting that she needs to obtain a Premium dress from Vivid Kiss' top designer, Kayoko, who is currently in America. Whilst pondering how to accomplish this, Mikuru is tasked with growing and delivering a golden Miracle Flower, which requires watering at specific times of the day whilst also working around her busy schedule. On the day before the flower is due to bloom, Mikuru worries when she narrowly misses a particular watering time, and the flower blooms in non-gold colors. The next day, Mikuru finds that the person who ordered the flower was Kayoko, who approves of the flower despite it not being gold and grants Mikuru a Constellation Premium dress, which she wears for her solo performance. After Mikuru manages to rank 8th on the rankings, Mizuki tells her about the goal to surpass Masquerade by September.
85	35	"Moon Desert's Rhapsody"; Transliteration: "Tsuki no Sabaku no Rapusodī" (Japanese: 月の砂漠の幻想曲（ラプソディー）)	June 5, 2014
Ran is invited to audition for a drama based on Aladdin alongside Sora, who is also asked to design outfits for the audition. Ran, along with Ichigo and Aoi, undergoes swordsmanship training for the role, with their teacher not only teaching them about the basics, but also how to break realism for the sake of putting on a good show. With some weaknesses remaining from her one-day lesson, Ran asks Ichigo and Aoi to help her overcome them by launching surprise attacks on her, with the other students joining in. Meanwhile, Sora finishes Ran's swordswoman outfit but struggles to decide on her own, contemplating what kind of princess she wants to be. Upon seeing Ran's swordsmanship come to fruition, Sora decides on a more unconventional dress for herself. The audition begins, in which an evil genie, played by Johnny, kidnaps Sora, tasking Ran with rescuing her, with her training paying off. When Ran is pushed into a corner, it is Sora who takes up the sword and stands to protect Ran, representing a princess who wants to protect the one she admires, rather than one who is simply protected, and the two of them join together to defeat the evil genie, both passing the audition.
86	36	"My Dear Idol!"; Transliteration: "Mai Dia Aidoru!" (Japanese: マイ ディア アイドル!)	June 12, 2014
Orihime and Tiara announce the beginning of the Aikatsu8 Elections, in which fans will show their support for their favorite idols, and the eight most popular idols will form a special unit known as Aikatsu8. They declare that the Elections are not limited to idols from Starlight and DreAca, so Mizuki and Mikuru from WM are eligible to participate. Wanting to mark the start of the Elections, Starlight Academy will be holding a live concert. Ichigo, Aoi, Ran, Seira, and Kii meet up at Cafe Vivo to discuss their PR plans for the Elections, with their fans submitting their ideas. Everybody has chosen their plan except for Aoi, who finds it hard to choose one idea over the other. Ichigo returns home temporarily, where she learns how much Raichi has grown over the years. Aoi receives a PR idea from a fan right before the deadline, which she eventually discovers is from Raichi. The plan, called "Go Go! Aoi Project", involves broadcasting Aoi running from Starlight Academy to the concert location. Ran and Ichigo support Aoi by running alongside her, with Raichi and his soccer team acting as Aoi's "bodyguards". Raichi begins to slow down near the end, but is carried by his teammates. Aoi, Ichigo, and Ran successfully run towards the concert location, where they perform with Yurika and Otome.
87	37	"Soleil Rising"; Transliteration: "Soreiyu Raijingu" (Japanese: ソレイユ☆ライジング)	June 19, 2014
Mizuki and Mikuru announce they want to challenge Soleil in a contest. Deciding to bring Soleil out of hiatus, Ichigo, Aoi, and Ran accept the challenge, but find their conflicting schedules give them little time to practice with each other. Noticing Akari and her roommate being Otome's managers for the day and remembering the time she became Mizuki's manager, Ichigo decides to arrange everyone's schedules so that whenever one person is working, the other two act as their managers. Using this routine, the girls get to observe Ran's dependability, Aoi's dedication, and Ichigo's liveliness firsthand. The experience reminds them of the great things they can do together, becoming excited over how much Soleil will have grown and practicing as much as they can. Although Ichigo makes a small timing mistake during their performance, Soleil brings out their best on the day of their live, cheering Mizuki up.
88	38	"Where Legends Are Born"; Transliteration: "Densetsu na Tsumugu Basho" (Japanese: 伝説なつむぐ場所)	June 26, 2014
While awaiting WM's performance, Mikuru worries that she will not be able to match Soleil's performance, but Mizuki gives her some assurance, stating she chose to face Soleil because they would be tough opponents. Meanwhile, Ichigo receives a call from Ringo, who states it is thanks to WM's appearance that Soleil can shine as a legend. Mizuki visits to Orihime, recalling her words that no idol can become a legend by herself, finally coming to understand the meaning of her words, whilst Mikuru pays a brief visit to Soleil, managing to overcome her nerves. With their resolve to become legends strengthened, WM brings out a stunning performance that wins out over Soleil. Afterwards, Mizuki gives her thanks to Soleil, stating it was because of them chasing her and Mikuru that WM managed to do their best.
89	39	"Admiration is Forever"; Transliteration: "Akogare wa Eien ni" (Japanese: あこがれは永遠に)	July 3, 2014
Yurika appears on a variety show to promote a cereal commercial she appeared in, announcing she will appear at a handshake event. As dozens of fans come to the event to shake Yurika's hand, Yurika feels guilty when she cannot answer a shy fan's question on how to become strong like she is. As Yurika ponders over this while helping Maya prepare for a Loli Gothic event, Ichigo and the others bring Kaede up to speed on the scandal surrounding Yurika a few years back. After receiving a Constellation Premium Dress from Maya, Yurika asks the others to help her find the fan she met the other day, using a book she had brought to the event as a clue to her identity. Upon finding the girl, Yurika appears before her in her normal appearance and gives a proper answer to her question, showing that people can grow stronger by making little changes each day.
90	40	"Glittering Futuring Girl"; Transliteration: "Hirameku Mirai Gāru" (Japanese: ひらめく✩未来ガール)	July 10, 2014
Aoi is requested to produce and star in her music video to promote Futuring Girl. As Aoi struggles to come up with an idea in the short time she's been given, she hears from Yurika about how her commercial was built up from a simple idea, inspiring Aoi to use a fashion show as the basis for her music video. After her ideas are approved by the rest of the staff, the hard work begins as Aoi collaborates with the other staff to develop the idea, facing additional challenges as changes have to be made. On the day of the video's shooting, Ichigo follows Ringo's advice and goes with Raichi to the studio in a rabbit suit to show their support and provide lunch. When Aoi suspects something is missing from the video, she is inspired by Ichigo moving about in her outfit to add some additional choreography, with the finished video becoming well-received.
91	41	"Assemble Aikatsu8"; Transliteration: "Kessei Aikatsu8" (Japanese: 結成☆アイカツ８)	July 17, 2014
The results of the Aikatsu 8 elections are announced, with the chosen idols being Seira, Otome, Sora, Maria, Mikuru, Yurika, Ichigo, and Mizuki. The chosen girls soon set off on their summer tour, with Mizuki put in charge of producing their performances. Spending their first night at a hotel, the girls discuss their intro videos showcasing their idol highlights. Later that night, Mizuki tells Ichigo about her dream to make everyone in Japan happy, asking her to think about the future of Aikatsu. The next day, Aikatsu8 perform their first concert on their tour, after which Seira offers Ichigo to help think about the future.
92	42	"Summer Idol Story"; Transliteration: "Samā Aidoru Sutōrī" (Japanese: サマーアイドルストーリー)	July 24, 2014
On the night before the last concert in their tour, the girls decide to hold a pajama party, taking pictures to use in their final concert. Later that night, Ichigo and Seira, still in deep thought about what Mizuki told her, come across Mikuru, who reveals Mizuki's goal to surpass Masquerade. At the end of the tour, Ichigo and Seira announce that they intend to surpass Mizuki and WM by September, believing that is where the future of Aikatsu lies.
93	43	"Twinkle Stars"; Transliteration: "Tinkuru Sutāzu" (Japanese: トゥインクル・スターズ)	July 31, 2014
Mizuki meets up with Orihime and proposes a Twinkle Star Cup, in which both Starlight Academy and Dream Academy will each put forward an idol to team up and challenge WM. Orihime entrusts Aoi with choosing an idol worthy of meeting Mizuki's challenge, with Kii also chosen to select an idol from Dream Academy. As the two visit the café to discuss how to go about it, a mishap involving a parfait and a cheesecake gives them a flash of inspiration. Aoi and Kii take Ichigo and Seira to have them try on each other's favorite brand, with each finding the change of style different. They continue this pace by trying each other's favorite activities. Wanting to clear things up, Aoi and Kii have Maria drop Ichigo and Seira in the middle of the woods, where they realize that although it is fine to be in sync, it is their differences that make their partnership special. Having faith in their friends for coming to this realization, Aoi and Kii pick Ichigo and Seira to face off against WM.
94	44	"Two Wings"; Transliteration: "Futatsu no Tsubasa" (Japanese: ふたつの翼)	August 7, 2014
Aoi and Kii host a meeting to come up with a name for Ichigo and Seira's unit, also receiving some input from Raichi and Noelle. After Seira promises to meet Noelle on Sunday, Johnny reveals that Ichigo and Seira's debut concert will also take place on the same day, so Ichigo decides to invite Noelle to their concert instead. When the pair thinks more about their goals as idols, to surpass WM and bring smiles to everyone, Aoi and Kii bring them over to Raichi and Noelle's school to perform a secret concert. Excited by everyone's smiles, Seira comes up with the name 2wingS, representing their desire to reach new heights.
95	45	"A Place Where Dreams Bloom"; Transliteration: "Yume no Saku Basho" (Japanese: 夢の咲く場所)	August 14, 2014
When they are by Kii's computer to find out the differences between Starlight Academy and Dream Academy, Ichigo and Seira trade places and spend a day attending each other's school. As each girl learns more about the differences between the two schools, Ichigo learns how Dream Academy is focused on freedom of choice, whilst Seira learns Starlight Academy focuses more on rivalry and overcoming limits. During the night, Seira encounters Naoto, who explains how Tiara came to create Dream Academy. Wanting girls to be able to fulfill their dreams of becoming idols, but fearing that not everyone would be able to achieve their goal, even after being accepted into Starlight Academy, Tiara decided to found her school based on her own beliefs, offering multiple courses so girls could choose who they wanted to be. Naoto further reveals that Tiara's ultimate dream was to debut as an idol that only Dream Academy can raise, which turned out to be Seira. With the exchange coming to an end, both Ichigo and Seira realize they were able to become the idols they are because of the schools they went to.
96	46	"Let's! Akari Summer"; Transliteration: "Rettsu! Akari Samā" (Japanese: レッツ！あかりサマー)	August 21, 2014
Akari, who has been struggling with performing Special Appeals, has to stay at school over the summer break for a training camp, whilst Ichigo sees Aoi and Ran off as they go to the Amazon for a film shoot before resuming her training with Seira. As Akari continues to struggle with a Special Appeal, she is sent a watermelon from her mother and receives a talk from Johnny. Later, Johnny approaches Ichigo about Akari's struggles, asking her to give Akari some support.
97	47	"The Secret Letter and the Invisible Star"; Transliteration: "Himitsu no Tegami to Mienai Hoshi" (Japanese: 秘密の手紙と見えない星)	August 28, 2014
As Akari continues to struggle on her own, Ichigo tries to think of a way to help her out. Recounting her experiences in America, Ichigo decides to open the letter Aoi gave her back then, reminding her that no matter the time or place, she can always talk to her. Inspired by Aoi's words of never losing sight of her goals, Ichigo gets Akari to confide in her about her problems and helps her to perfect her Special Appeal. Thanks to Ichigo's support, Akari eventually performs a Special Appeal and passes the training camp.
98	48	"Twin Dresses"; Transliteration: "Futago no Doresu" (Japanese: ふたごのドレス)	September 4, 2014
Ichigo and Seira start thinking about what outfits they should wear for their concert against WM, struggling to come up with an exciting coordination. Aoi and Kii hear rumors about an unused coord concept Masquerade was planning, so Orihime gives the girls the key to Masquerade's reference room, where they learn Masquerade planned to have their favorite designers make a pair of twin dresses that complemented each other like butterfly wings. Despite some doubts due to the contrast between Angely Sugar and Swing Rock, the girls make their request to both brands' designers, who agree to work together to make a pair of twin dresses. Worried about the designers after a few days of no word, the girls head to their workshop to check up on them, where they witness the final product, the Gemini Coord. Before the girls can celebrate, however, they learn that WM had been planning the same thing and had their twin dresses made.
99	49	"The Flower's Tears"; Transliteration: "Hana no Namida" (Japanese: 花の涙)	September 11, 2014
Mizuki and Mikuru announce they plan to disband WM following the Twinkle Star Cup, regardless of whether they win or lose. Curious as to how they came to that decision, Ichigo and Seira visit them to find out why. Mikuru explains she decided to break up so she can focus on an upcoming gardening tournament and make gardening more popular in Japan. As Ichigo and Seira practice hard to respond to their wishes, Mikuru shows Mizuki her idea for the gardening tournament. The day of the Twinkle Star Cup soon arrives, with WM first up to perform. Mikuru gives Mizuki her heartfelt gratitude for everything she has done for her, while Ichigo and Seira prepare for their performance.
100	50	"The Wings to Our Dreams"; Transliteration: "Yume e no Tsubasa" (Japanese: 夢へのツバサ)	September 18, 2014
As the crowd is amazed by WM's performance, Ichigo and Seira think about the opportunities that await them even after the concert. Excited, the two girls give a stunning performance on stage to end the Twinkle Star Cup. With the votes across the nation tallied together, the winning unit is revealed to be 2wingS. When the idols are interviewed, Seira thanks her fans while Ichigo expresses her desire to chase after many more dreams. Hearing Ichigo's words, Mizuki expresses the joy of becoming an idol and aiming to make Aikatsu! shine brighter, before presenting Ichigo and Seira with their winning trophy. Afterwards, Mizuki shows her gratitude to Orihime and Ringo, while Mikuru expresses her dream to face Mizuki as a rival idol.
101	51	"The Shining Line of Admiration"; Transliteration: "Akogare no Shining Line" (Japanese: 憧れのShining Line)	September 25, 2014
As the first-year students are about to perform an annual recital, Akari tries to keep thoughts of admiration for Ichigo out of her head so she can focus on her performance. Ichigo explains that her admiration for Mizuki is what led her to join Starlight Academy, stating it was Akari's initiative that led her to enroll. Encouraged to forge her idol path, Akari steps onto her stage, with Ichigo, Aoi, and Ran joining her on stage. After Mizuki sees Mikuru off at the airport, the students have a tea party, where Akari prepares to start her idol activities.
